= 2021 Gamba Osaka season =

Gamba Osaka
2021 season
- Chairman: Takashi Yamauchi
- Head coach: Tsuneyasu Miyamoto (until 14 May); Masanobu Matsunami (from 15 May)
- Stadium: Panasonic Stadium Suita
- J1 League: 13th
- Emperor's Cup: Quarter-finals
- J.League Cup: Quarter-finals
- Japanese Super Cup: Runner-up
- Top goalscorer: League: Patric (13 goals); All: Patric (23 goals)
- Highest home attendance: 16,699 v Shonan Bellmare; 4 December 2021 (J1 League)
- Lowest home attendance: 2,874 v Shonan Bellmare; 22 September 2021 (Emperor's Cup)
- Average home league attendance: 7,255
- Biggest win: 8–1 v Tampines Rovers; 7 July 2021 (AFC Champions League)
- Biggest defeat: 0–4 v Cerezo Osaka; 5 September 2021 (J.League Cup); 1–5 v Consadole Sapporo; 2 October 2021 (J1 League)
Home colours	Away colours

The 2021 Gamba Osaka season was the club's 41st season in existence and the eighth consecutive season in the top flight of Japanese football. In addition to the domestic league, Gamba Osaka participated in the Emperor's Cup, the J.League Cup, the AFC Champions League and the Japanese Super Cup.

== Background ==
After finishing runners-up in both the league and the Emperor's Cup in 2020, Gamba Osaka started the season competing in the Japanese Super Cup but narrowly lost to stoppage time winning goal. Their league campaign was then heavily disrupted by an outbreak of COVID-19 in the squad. After losing their first league game of the season on 27 February, they did not play another game until 4 April. They started the league campaign extremely poorly, winning only one of their first ten games and only scoring three goals in the process. This run led to the dismissal of manager Tsuneyasu Miyamoto following their 2–1 home defeat to Sanfrecce Hiroshima. Head of the academy Masanobu Matsunami took over on an interim basis, until in June it was announced he would be taking over the managerial role for the remainder of the season. In spite of being in the relegation places for the first half of the season and being one of the league's lowest scorers, Gamba managed to string some results together in the second half of the season and finished in 13th place, eight points clear of relegation.

Gamba did fare slightly better in the cup competitions, reaching the quarter-finals of the Emperor's Cup before a home defeat to Urawa Red Diamonds. They also reached the quarter-finals of the J.League Cup, but this was the round they entered the competition at due to their commitments in the AFC Champions League.

Competing in the continental competition for the first time since 2017, Gamba went out at the group stage despite only losing one game out of their six matches. This included an 8–1 victory over Singapore's Tampines Rovers.

Patric was the stand-out performer for Gamba throughout the season, scoring 23 goals in all competitions, 38% of all goals that they scored. He finished joint 5th in the overall league scoring charts.

== Players ==
=== Season squad ===
Squad no.	Name	Nationality	Date of birth (age at start of season)
Goalkeepers
1	Masaaki Higashiguchi	(Japan)	12 May 1986 (aged 34)
22	Jun Ichimori	(Japan)	2 July 1991 (aged 29)
23	Mizuki Hayashi	(Japan)	4 September 1996 (aged 24)
25	Kei Ishikawa	(Japan)	30 September 1992 (aged 28)
31	Taichi Kato	(Japan)	14 April 1997 (aged 23)
Defenders
3	Gen Shoji	(Japan)	11 December 1992 (aged 28)
4	Hiroki Fujiharu	(Japan)	24 November 1988 (aged 32)
5	Genta Miura	(Japan)	1 March 1995 (aged 25)
13	Shunya Suganuma	(Japan)	17 May 1990 (aged 30)
16	Yota Sato	(Japan)	10 September 1998 (aged 22)
19	Kim Young-gwon	(South Korea)	27 February 1990 (aged 31)
24	Keisuke Kurokawa	(Japan)	13 April 1997 (aged 23)
26	Ko Yanagisawa	(Japan)	28 June 1996 (aged 24)
27	Ryu Takao	(Japan)	9 November 1996 (aged 24)
40	Shin Won-ho	(South Korea)	19 May 2001 (aged 19)
Midfielders
6	Ju Se-jong	(South Korea)	30 October 1990 (aged 30)
8	Kosuke Onose	(Japan)	22 April 1993 (aged 27)
10	Shu Kurata	(Japan)	26 November 1988 (aged 32)
14	Yuya Fukuda	(Japan)	4 April 1999 (aged 21)
15	Yosuke Ideguchi	(Japan)	23 August 1996 (aged 24)
17	Kohei Okuno	(Japan)	3 April 2000 (aged 20)
21	Shinya Yajima	(Japan)	18 January 1994 (aged 27)
29	Yuki Yamamoto	(Japan)	6 November 1997 (aged 23)
39	Takashi Usami	(Japan)	6 May 1992 (aged 28)
41	Jiro Nakamura	(Japan)	22 August 2003 (aged 17)
Forwards
9	Leandro Pereira	(Brazil)	13 July 1991 (aged 29)
11	Yuji Ono	(Japan)	22 December 1992 (aged 28)
18	Patric	(Brazil)	26 October 1987 (aged 33)
20	Kazunari Ichimi	(Japan)	10 November 1997 (aged 23)
28	Wellington Silva	(Brazil)	6 January 1993 (aged 28)
30	Dai Tsukamoto	(Japan)	23 June 2001 (aged 19)
32	Tiago Alves	(Brazil)	12 January 1993 (aged 28)
33	Haruto Shirai	(Japan)	23 October 1999 (aged 21)
34	Shuhei Kawasaki	(Japan)	28 April 2001 (aged 19)
37	Hiroto Yamami	(Japan)	16 August 1998 (aged 22)

Last updated: End of 2021 season.
Source: Soccer-DB

== Transfers ==
=== Arrivals ===
Date	Position	Player	From	Type	Source
21 December 2020	DF	(Japan) Yota Sato	(Japan) Meiji University	Full	
4 January 2021	GK	(Japan) Mizuki Hayashi	(Japan) Renofa Yamaguchi	Return from loan	
4 January 2021	FW	(Japan) Kazunari Ichimi	(Japan) Yokohama FC	Return from loan	
6 January 2021	MF	(South Korea) Ju Se-jong	(South Korea) FC Seoul	Full	
22 January 2021	FW	(Brazil) Leandro Pereira	(Japan) Matsumoto Yamaga	Full	
23 January 2021	FW	(Brazil) Tiago Alves	(Japan) Sagan Tosu	Full	
24 March 2021	GK	(Japan) Taichi Kato	(Japan) Ehime FC	Loan	
25 March 2021	FW	(Brazil) Wellington Silva	(Brazil) Fluminense	Full	
26 July 2021	DF	(Japan) Ko Yanagisawa	(Japan) Mito Hollyhock	Full	

=== Departures ===
Date	Position	Player	To	Type	Source
5 October 2020	MF	(Japan) Yasuhito Endo	(Japan) Júbilo Iwata	Loan	
28 December 2020	FW	(Brazil) Ademilson		Contract terminated	
4 January 2021	GK	(Japan) Kosei Tani	(Japan) Shonan Bellmare	Loan extension	
4 January 2021	MF	(Japan) Takahiro Ko	(Japan) Albirex Niigata	Full	
4 January 2021	FW	(Japan) Kazuma Watanabe	(Japan) Yokohama FC	Full	
4 January 2021	FW	(Japan) Daisuke Takagi	(Japan) Renofa Yamaguchi	Full	
5 January 2021	MF	(Japan) Mizuki Ichimaru	(Japan) FC Ryukyu	Full	
6 January 2021	DF	(Japan) Riku Matsuda	(Japan) Zweigen Kanazawa	Full	
6 January 2021	DF	(Japan) Tatsuya Yamaguchi	(Japan) Tokyo Verdy	Full	
7 January 2021	DF	(Japan) Ryo Shinzato	(Japan) V-Varen Nagasaki	End of loan	
7 January 2021	FW	(Japan) Akito Takagi	(Japan) Thespakusatsu Gunma	Full	
8 January 2021	MF	(Japan) Ren Shibamoto	(Japan) SC Sagamihara	Loan	
9 January 2021	MF	(Japan) Leo Takae	(Japan) Machida Zelvia	Full	
8 February 2021	FW	(Japan) Keito Nakamura	(Austria) FC Juniors OÖ	Loan	
27 April 2021	FW	(Japan) Shoji Toyama	(Japan) Ehime FC	Loan	
11 August 2021	FW	(Japan) Kazunari Ichimi	(Japan) Tokushima Vortis	Full	
11 August 2021	FW	(Japan) Keito Nakamura	(Austria) LASK	Full	
10 September 2021	FW	(Japan) Shuhei Kawasaki	(Portugal) Portimonense	Full	

== Competitions ==
=== Overall record ===
Competition	First match	Last match	Starting round	Final position	Record							
Competition	First match	Last match	Starting round	Final position	Pld	W	D	L	GF	GA	GD	Win %
J1 League	27 February 2021	4 December 2021	Matchday 1	13th place	38	12	8	18	33	49	−16	31.58
Emperor's Cup	16 June 2021	27 October 2021	Second round	Quarter-finals	4	3	0	1	9	4	+5	75.00
J.League Cup	1 September 2021	4 September 2021	Quarter-finals	Quarter-finals	2	1	0	1	1	4	−3	50.00
AFC Champions League	25 June 2021	10 July 2021	Group stage	Group stage	6	2	3	1	15	7	+8	33.33
Japanese Super Cup	20 February 2021		Final	Runners-up	1	0	0	1	2	3	−1	0.00
Total					51	18	11	22	60	67	−7	35.29

Source: Soccerway

=== J1 League ===
==== League table ====
Pos	Team	Pld	W	D	L	GF	GA	GD	Pts
11	Sanfrecce Hiroshima	38	12	13	13	44	42	+2	49
12	Cerezo Osaka	38	13	9	16	47	51	−4	48
13	Gamba Osaka	38	12	8	18	33	49	−16	44
14	Shimizu S-Pulse	38	10	12	16	37	54	−17	42
15	Kashiwa Reysol	38	12	5	21	37	56	−19	41

Source: J.League Data Site
Rules for classification: 1) Points; 2) Goal difference; 3) Goals scored; 4) Head-to-head points; 5) Head-to-head goal difference; 6) Head-to-head goal scored; 7) Fair-play points.

==== Results summary ====
Overall								Home						Away					
Pld	W	D	L	GF	GA	GD	Pts	W	D	L	GF	GA	GD	W	D	L	GF	GA	GD
38	12	8	18	33	49	−16	44	5	4	10	17	28	−11	7	4	8	16	21	−5

Source: J.League Data Site

==== Results by round ====
Round	1	2	3	4	5	6	7	8	9	10	11	12	13	14	15	16	17	18	19	20	21	22	23	24	25	26	27	28	29	30	31	32	33	34	35	36	37	38
Ground	A	A	H	A	A	H	A	A	H	H	H	A	H	H	A	A	H	H	H	A	A	A	H	A	H	A	H	H	A	H	H	A	H	A	A	H	A	H
Result	L	D	D	L	W	D	L	D	L	L	L	L	W	W	D	W	L	L	W	W	W	L	L	W	D	L	L	L	L	W	L	D	W	W	W	L	L	D
Position	16	19	18	18	17	18	18	18	18	18	19	19	18	18	16	17	17	17	15	13	13	13	13	12	13	13	13	14	14	13	14	14	13	13	13	13	13	13

Source: J.League Data Site
A = Away; H = Home; W = Win; D = Draw; L = Loss

==== Matches ====
Due to an outbreak of COVID-19 within the team after the first league game, Gamba did not play another game until the seventh game week.

27 February 1	Vissel Kobe	1–0	Gamba Osaka	Kobe
17:03 JST	Furuhashi 79'	Report		Stadium: Noevir Stadium Kobe; Attendance: 4,636; Referee: Ruji Sato
Note: Matchweek 1

3 April 2	Sanfrecce Hiroshima	0–0	Gamba Osaka	Hiroshima
14:03 JST		Report		Stadium: Edion Stadium Hiroshima; Attendance: 8,665; Referee: Ryuji Sato
Note: Matchweek 7

7 April 3	Gamba Osaka	0–0	Avispa Fukuoka	Suita
19:03 JST		Report		Stadium: Panasonic Stadium Suita; Attendance: 5,604; Referee: Akihiko Ikeuchi
Note: Matchweek 8

11 April 4	Kashiwa Reysol	1–0	Gamba Osaka	Kashiwa
17:03 JST	Otani 76'	Report		Stadium: Sankyo Frontier Kashiwa Stadium; Attendance: 5,555; Referee: Koei Koya
Note: Matchweek 9

14 April 5	Sagan Tosu	0–1	Gamba Osaka	Tosu
19:03 JST		Report	Usami 68'	Stadium: Ekimae Real Estate Stadium; Attendance: 4,512; Referee: Hayato Shimizu
Note: Originally scheduled for matchweek 18

18 April 6	Gamba Osaka	0–0	Shimizu S-Pulse	Suita
17:03 JST		Report		Stadium: Panasonic Stadium Suita; Attendance: 4,819; Referee: Nobutsugu Murakami
Note: Matchweek 10

22 April 7	Nagoya Grampus	2–0	Gamba Osaka	Toyota
19:33 JST	Yamasaki 29'; Soma 55'	Report		Stadium: Toyota Stadium; Attendance: 7,463; Referee: Hiroki Kasahara
Note: Matchweek 11

2 May 8	Cerezo Osaka	1–1	Gamba Osaka	Osaka
15:03 JST	Nakajima 74'	Report	Patric 82' (pen.)	Stadium: Yodoko Sakura Stadium; Referee: Yoshiro Imamura
Note: Matchweek 12

8 May 9	Gamba Osaka	0–2	Kawasaki Frontale	Suita
18:03 JST		Report	Damião 41'; Mitoma 76'	Stadium: Panasonic Stadium Suita; Referee: Ryo Tanimoto
Note: Matchweek 13

12 May 10	Gamba Osaka	1–2	Sanfrecce Hiroshima	Suita
18:03 JST	Osako 44' (o.g.)	Report	Sasaki 36'; Kawabe 65'	Stadium: Panasonic Stadium Suita; Referee: Yuichi Nishimura
Note: Brought forward from matchweek 20

16 May 11	Gamba Osaka	0–3	Urawa Red Diamonds	Suita
17:03 JST		Report	Junker 16', 40'; Tanaka 20'	Stadium: Panasonic Stadium Suita; Referee: Hiroki Kasahara
Note: Matchweek 14

22 May 12	FC Tokyo	1–0	Gamba Osaka	Chōfu
19:01 JST	Oliveira 1'	Report		Stadium: Ajinomoto Stadium; Attendance: 4,886; Referee: Koichiro Fukushima
Note: Matchweek 15

27 May 13	Gamba Osaka	2–1	Tokushima Vortis	Suita
19:03 JST	Patric 27'; Usami 72'	Report	Iwao 67' (pen.)	Stadium: Panasonic Stadium Suita; Referee: Jumpei Iida
Note: Matchweek 16

30 May 14	Gamba Osaka	2–0	Yokohama FC	Suita
17:03 JST	Pereira 42' (pen.), 55'	Report		Stadium: Panasonic Stadium Suita; Referee: Takuto Okabe
Note: Matchweek 17

2 June 15	Shonan Bellmare	0–0	Gamba Osaka	Hiratsuka
19:03 JST		Report		Stadium: Lemon Gas Stadium Hiratsuka; Attendance: 4,610; Referee: Akihiko Ikeuchi
Note: Brought forward from matchweek 19

17 July 16	Avispa Fukuoka	0–1	Gamba Osaka	Fukuoka
18:34 JST		Report	Patric 85'	Stadium: Best Denki Stadium; Attendance: 6,591; Referee: Koichiro Fukushima
Note: Matchweek 21

21 July 17	Gamba Osaka	1–2	Vissel Kobe	Suita
19:03 JST	Patric 19'	Report	Douglas 26'; Tanaka 31'	Stadium: Panasonic Stadium Suita; Attendance: 4,998; Referee: Jumpei Iida
Note: Matchweek 22

24 July 18	Gamba Osaka	0–1	Kashima Antlers	Suita
19:03 JST		Report	Caíke 72'	Stadium: Panasonic Stadium Suita; Attendance: 4,961; Referee: Hajime Matsuo
Note: Rescheduled matchweek 2 fixture

27 July 19	Gamba Osaka	2–1	Oita Trinita	Suita
19:03 JST	Pereira 84'; Usami 90+4'	Report	Trevisan 60'	Stadium: Panasonic Stadium Suita; Attendance: 4,205; Referee: Nobutsugu Murakami
Note: Rescheduled matchweek 3 fixture

30 July 20	Consadole Sapporo	0–2	Gamba Osaka	Sapporo
18:03 JST		Report	Yajima 29'; Pereira 53'	Stadium: Sapporo Atsubetsu Stadium; Attendance: 3,845; Referee: Akihiko Ikeuchi
Note: Rescheduled matchweek 4 fixture

3 August 21	Vegalta Sendai	0–1	Gamba Osaka	Sendai
19:03 JST		Report	Patric 35'	Stadium: Yurtec Stadium Sendai; Attendance: 4,940; Referee: Yusuke Araki
Note: Rescheduled matchweek 5 fixture

6 August 22	Gamba Osaka	2–3	Yokohama F. Marinos	Suita
19:03 JST	Leandro 56' (pen.); Patric 90+5'	Report	Élber 32'; Marcos Júnior 48'; Mizunuma 74'	Stadium: Panasonic Stadium Suita; Attendance: 4,459; Referee: Masaaki Iemoto
Note: Rescheduled matchweek 6 fixture

9 August 23	Tokushima Vortis	2–1	Gamba Osaka	Naruto
19:04 JST	Miyashiro 30'; Nishiya 45+1'	Report	Alves 90+1'	Stadium: Pocarisweat Stadium; Attendance: 6,415; Referee: Hiroki Kasahara

13 August 24	Shimizu S-Pulse	0–1	Gamba Osaka	Shimizu
19:03 JST		Report	Yamami 82'	Stadium: IAI Stadium Nihondaira; Attendance: 6,865; Referee: Koichiro Fukushima

21 August 25	Gamba Osaka	0–0	FC Tokyo	Suita
19:01 JST		Report		Stadium: Panasonic Stadium Suita; Attendance: 4,973; Referee: Yuichi Nishimura

25 August 26	Yokohama FC	3–1	Gamba Osaka	Yokohama
19:03 JST	Silva 45+5'; Vizeu 80'; Yasunaga 90+8'	Report	Sato (red card) 45+2'; Ono 48'	Stadium: Mitsuzawa Stadium; Attendance: 3,892; Referee: Yoshiro Imamura

28 August 27	Gamba Osaka	0–1	Cerezo Osaka	Suita
19:03 JST		Report	Matsuda 51'	Stadium: Panasonic Stadium Suita; Attendance: 4,976; Referee: Masaaki Iemoto

12 September 28	Gamba Osaka	2–3	Vegalta Sendai	Suita
18:33 JST	Yajima 39'; Patric 60' (pen.)	Report	Togashi 37', 42'; Nishimura 79'	Stadium: Panasonic Stadium Suita; Attendance: 4,777; Referee: Hiroki Kasahara

18 September 29	Kashima Antlers	3–1	Gamba Osaka	Kashima
18:03 JST	Ueda 52'; Alano 60'; Doi 73'	Report	Alves 80' (pen.)	Stadium: Kashima Soccer Stadium; Attendance: 3,586; Referee: Akihiko Ikeuchi

26 September 30	Gamba Osaka	2–1	Kashiwa Reysol	Suita
19:03 JST	Usami 3'; Suganuma 26'	Report	Kamiya 86'	Stadium: Panasonic Stadium Suita; Attendance: 4,886; Referee: Koichiro Fukushima

2 October 31	Gamba Osaka	1–5	Consadole Sapporo	Suita
19:03 JST	Patric 65'	Report	Komai 5'; Fernandes 32'; Takamine 40'; Kaneko 47'; Oliveira 88'	Stadium: Panasonic Stadium Suita; Attendance: 9,987; Referee: Masuya Ueda

16 October 32	Urawa Red Diamonds	1–1	Gamba Osaka	Saitama
15:04 JST	Esaka 90+1' (pen.)	Report	Patric 90+4' (pen.)	Stadium: Saitama Stadium 2002; Attendance: 10,233; Referee: Hayato Shimizu

23 October 33	Gamba Osaka	1–0	Sagan Tosu	Suita
17:03 JST	Usami 10'	Report		Stadium: Panasonic Stadium Suita; Attendance: 9,886; Referee: Ryo Tanimoto

3 November 34	Yokohama F. Marinos	0–1	Gamba Osaka	Yokohama
13:09 JST		Report	Kurata 55'	Stadium: Nissan Stadium; Attendance: 21,528; Referee: Futoshi Nakamura

7 November 35	Oita Trinita	2–3	Gamba Osaka	Ōita
14:03 JST	Fujiharu 28' (o.g.); Goya 39'	Report	Patric 29', 53', 84' (pen.)	Stadium: Resonac Dome Oita; Attendance: 10,021; Referee: Masuya Ueda

20 November 36	Gamba Osaka	1–3	Nagoya Grampus	Suita
14:02 JST	Patric 53'	Report	Świerczok 8', 29'; Kakitani 22'	Stadium: Panasonic Stadium Suita; Attendance: 16,343; Referee: Hiroyuki Kimura

27 November 37	Kawasaki Frontale	4–1	Gamba Osaka	Kawasaki
14:03 JST	Damião 7', 85'; Hatate 9'; Kurumaya 90+4'	Report	Usami 17'	Stadium: Kawasaki Todoroki Stadium; Attendance: 14,867; Referee: Takuto Okabe

4 December 38	Gamba Osaka	0–0	Shonan Bellmare	Suita
14:03 JST		Report		Stadium: Panasonic Stadium Suita; Attendance: 16,699; Referee: Hayato Shimizu

=== Emperor's Cup ===
16 June Second round	Gamba Osaka	3–1	Kwansei Gakuin University	Suita
18:00 JST	Onose 11'; Wellington Silva 21'; Patric 87'	Report	Waki 55'	Stadium: Panasonic Stadium Suita; Attendance: 4,031; Referee: Ryo Tanimoto

18 August Third round	Gamba Osaka	2–0 (a.e.t.)	Matsumoto Yamaga FC	Suita
18:00 JST	Yanagisawa 95'; Ideguchi 100'	Report		Stadium: Panasonic Stadium Suita; Attendance: 3,123; Referee: Ryo Tanimoto

22 September Round of 16	Gamba Osaka	4–1	Shonan Bellmare	Suita
18:00 JST	Patric 2', 56'; Wellington Silva 26'; Kurata 42'	Report	Shibata 64'	Stadium: Panasonic Stadium Suita; Attendance: 2,874; Referee: Koei Koya

27 October Quarter-finals	Gamba Osaka	0–2	Urawa Red Diamonds	Suita
18:30 JST		Report	Junker 10'; Sekine 42'	Stadium: Panasonic Stadium Suita; Attendance: 5,553; Referee: Yuichi Nishimura

=== J.League Cup ===
Due to their involvement in the 2021 AFC Champions League, Gamba received a bye for the group and playoff stages of the competition. However, they were knocked out at their first hurdle, the quarter-final stage, by Osaka rivals Cerezo Osaka.

==== Quarter-finals ====
1 September Quarter-final Leg 1	Cerezo Osaka	0–1	Gamba Osaka	Osaka
19:03 JST		Report	Yamami 89'	Stadium: Yodoko Sakura Stadium; Attendance: 4,205; Referee: Koichiro Fukushima

5 September Quarter-final Leg 2	Gamba Osaka	0–4	Cerezo Osaka	Osaka
19:03 JST		Report	Yamada 24'; M. Kato 32'; Fujita 56'; Matsuda 68'	Stadium: Panasonic Stadium Suita; Attendance: 4,869; Referee: Hajime Matsuo

Cerezo Osaka won 4–1 on aggregate.

=== AFC Champions League ===
==== Group stage ====
Gamba Osaka were drawn into Group H, alongside two-time winners Jeonbuk Hyundai Motors of South Korea, Tampines Rovers of Singapore and Australia's Sydney FC. In June 2021, it was announced that all Australian teams would not be participating in the 2021 AFC Champions League due to the ongoing COVID-19 pandemic. Sydney FC were replaced in Group H by Thailand's Chiangrai United.

The games in Group H all took place in Tashkent, Uzbekistan between 25 June and 10 July. All matches were played behind closed doors due to the COVID-19 pandemic in Uzbekistan.

Pos	Team	Pld	W	D	L	GF	GA	GD	Pts	Qualification
1	(South Korea) Jeonbuk Hyundai Motors	6	5	1	0	22	5	+17	16	Advance to Round of 16
2	(Japan) Gamba Osaka	6	2	3	1	15	7	+8	9	
3	(Thailand) Chiangrai United	6	2	2	2	8	7	+1	8	
4	(Singapore) Tampines Rovers	6	0	0	6	1	27	−26	0	

Source: AFC

25 June 1	Tampines Rovers (Singapore)	0–2	(Japan) Gamba Osaka	Tashkent
19:00 UZT (UTC+5)		Report	Patric 26'; Pereira 88'	Stadium: Lokomotiv Stadium; Attendance: 0 Referee: Nivon Robesh Gamini (Sri Lanka)

28 June 2	Gamba Osaka (Japan)	2–2	(South Korea) Jeonbuk Hyundai Motors	Tashkent
21:00 UZT (UTC+5)	Patric 27', 31'	Report	Iljutcenko 2'; Kunimoto 17'	Stadium: Lokomotiv Stadium; Attendance: 0 Referee: Mohammed Al-Hoish (Saudi Arabia)

1 July 3	Chiangrai United (Thailand)	1–1	(Japan) Gamba Osaka	Tashkent
21:00 UZT (UTC+5)	Bill 90+4'	Report	Pereira 88'	Stadium: Bunyodkor Stadium; Attendance: 0 Referee: Ahmed Al-Kaf (Oman)

4 July 4	Gamba Osaka (Japan)	1–1	(Thailand) Chiangrai United	Tashkent
21:00 UZT (UTC+5)	Brinner 54' (o.g.)	Report	Felipe Amorim 6'	Stadium: Lokomotiv Stadium; Attendance: 0 Referee: Mohd Amirul Izwan Yaacob (Malaysia)

7 July 5	Gamba Osaka (Japan)	8–1	(Singapore) Tampines Rovers	Tashkent
19:00 UZT (UTC+5)	Kurata 21'; Kawasaki 25', 53', 80'; Ichimi 28'; Wellington 75'; Patric 78', 87'	Report	Bennett 27'	Stadium: Bunyodkor Stadium; Attendance: 0 Referee: Yu Ming-hsun (Chinese Taipei)

10 July 6	Jeonbuk Hyundai Motors (South Korea)	2–1	(Japan) Gamba Osaka	Tashkent
19:00 UZT (UTC+5)	Gustavo 6' (pen.); Barrow 88'	Report	Patric 53'	Stadium: Bunyodkor Stadium; Attendance: 0 Referee: Ahmed Al-Kaf (Oman)

=== Japanese Super Cup ===
20 February	Kawasaki Frontale	3–2	Gamba Osaka	Saitama
13:35 JST	Mitoma 29', 33'; Kobayashi 90+6'	Report	Yajima 60'; Patric 67' (pen.)	Stadium: Saitama Stadium 2002, Saitama; Attendance: 4,208; Referee: Yusuke Araki

== Statistics ==
=== Appearances ===
No.	Name	J1 League		Emperor's Cup		J.League Cup		AFC CL		Super Cup		Total	
No.	Name	Apps	Goals	Apps	Goals	Apps	Goals	Apps	Goals	Apps	Goals	Apps	Goals
Goalkeepers
1	(Japan) Masaaki Higashiguchi	38	0	1	0	2	0	4	0	1	0	46	0
25	(Japan) Kei Ishikawa	0	0	3	0	0	0	2	0	0	0	5	0
Defenders
3	(Japan) Gen Shoji	26+2	0	0	0	1	0	5	0	0	0	36	0
4	(Japan) Hiroki Fujiharu	16+3	0	0+2	0	1	0	2	0	1	0	25	0
5	(Japan) Genta Miura	25+1	0	0+1	0	2	0	4+1	0	1	0	35	0
13	(Japan) Shunya Suganuma	19	1	4	0	2	0	2	0	1	0	28	1
16	(Japan) Yota Sato	7+1	0	4	0	0	0	2	0	0	0	14	0
19	(South Korea) Kim Young-gwon	16	0	0	0	0	0	4	0	0	0	20	0
24	(Japan) Keisuke Kurokawa	15+4	0	3	0	1	0	1+5	0	0	0	29	0
26	(Japan) Ko Yanagisawa	7+8	0	3	1	1+1	0	0	0	0	0	20	1
27	(Japan) Ryu Takao	11+8	0	1+2	0	0+1	0	1	0	0+1	0	25	0
40	(South Korea) Shin Won-ho	0	0	0+1	0	0	0	0	0	0	0	1	0
Midfielders
6	(South Korea) Ju Se-jong	12+10	0	2+1	0	0	0	0	0	0	0	25	0
8	(Japan) Kosuke Onose	22+9	0	3+1	1	1+1	0	4+1	0	1	0	43	1
10	(Japan) Shu Kurata	26+11	1	0+3	1	1+2	0	3+3	1	1	0	49	3
14	(Japan) Yuya Fukuda	8+6	0	0	0	0	0	2	0	0	0	16	0
15	(Japan) Yosuke Ideguchi	24+5	0	2+1	1	2	0	5+1	0	1	0	41	1
17	(Japan) Kohei Okuno	16+10	0	4	0	1	0	3+2	0	0	0	36	0
21	(Japan) Shinya Yajima	17+9	2	0+1	0	1+2	0	4	0	1	1	34	3
29	(Japan) Yuki Yamamoto	20+8	0	1+2	0	1+2	0	2+1	0	1	0	36	0
39	(Japan) Takashi Usami	28+10	6	2+2	0	1+2	0	5	0	0	0	49	6
41	(Japan) Jiro Nakamura	0+1	0	0	0	0	0	0	0	0	0	1	0
Forwards
9	(Brazil) Leandro Pereira	15+9	5	0+1	0	1+2	0	2+4	2	0+1	0	34	7
11	(Japan) Yuji Ono	2+5	1	1+2	0	1	0	1+2	0	0	0	13	1
18	(Brazil) Patric	22+11	13	2+1	3	1+1	0	3+3	6	1	1	45	23
20	(Japan) Kazunari Ichimi	6+12	1	1	0	0	0	1+2	1	0+1	0	23	2
28	(Brazil) Wellington Silva	8+13	0	3	2	0	0	1+4	1	0	0	29	3
30	(Japan) Dai Tsukamoto	4+4	0	0+1	0	0	0	1	0	0	0	10	0
32	(Brazil) Tiago Alves	6+11	2	2+1	0	0	0	0	0	0+1	0	21	2
33	(Japan) Haruto Shirai	1	0	0	0	0	0	0	0	0	0	1	0
34	(Japan) Shuhei Kawasaki	1+2	0	2	0	0	0	2+1	3	1	0	9	3
37	(Japan) Hiroto Yamami	0+5	1	0	0	1+1	1	0	0	0	0	7	2
Players loaned or transferred out during the season
7	(Brazil) Juan Alano	5+7	1	2+1	0	3+1	0	0	0	0	0	19	1
18	(Japan) Ayase Ueda	17+1	10	0+1	1	2+2	3	0	0	0	0	25	14
19	(Japan) Itsuki Someno	0+12	1	1	1	2+6	2	0	0	0	0	21	4

Last updated: 12 June 2023.
Source: jleague.co, Soccer D.B.

=== Goalscorers ===
The list is sorted by shirt number when total goals are equal.

Rnk	Pos	No.	Player	J1	EC	JLC	AFC	JSC	Total
1	FW	18	(Brazil) Patric	13	3	0	6	1	23
2	FW	9	(Brazil) Leandro Pereira	5	0	0	2	0	7
3	MF	39	(Japan) Takashi Usami	6	0	0	0	0	6
4	MF	10	(Japan) Shu Kurata	1	1	0	1	0	3
4	MF	21	(Japan) Shinya Yajima	2	0	0	0	1	3
4	FW	28	(Brazil) Wellington Silva	0	2	0	1	0	3
4	FW	34	(Japan) Shuhei Kawasaki	0	0	0	3	0	3
8	MF	20	(Japan) Kazunari Ichimi	1	0	0	1	0	2
8	FW	32	(Brazil) Tiago Alves	2	0	0	0	0	2
8	FW	37	(Japan) Hiroto Yamami	1	0	1	0	0	2
11	MF	8	(Japan) Kosuke Onose	0	1	0	0	0	1
11	FW	11	(Japan) Yuji Ono	1	0	0	0	0	1
11	DF	13	(Japan) Shunya Suganuma	1	0	0	0	0	1
11	MF	15	(Japan) Yosuke Ideguchi	0	1	0	0	0	1
11	DF	26	(Japan) Ko Yanagisawa	0	1	0	0	0	1
11	–	–	Own goal	0	0	0	1	0	1
TOTALS				33	9	1	15	2	60

Last updated: 13 June 2023.
Source: jleague.co, besoccer.com

=== Clean sheets ===
The list is sorted by shirt number when total clean sheets are equal.

Rnk	No.	Player	J1	EC	JLC	AFC	JSC	Total
1	1	(Japan) Masaaki Higashiguchi	14	0	1	1	0	16
2	25	(Japan) Kei Ishikawa	0	1	0	0	0	1
TOTALS			14	1	1	1	0	17

Last updated: 13 June 2023.
Source: fbref.com
