= 2023 Gamba Osaka season =

Gamba Osaka
2023 season
- Chairman: Takashi Yamauchi
- Head coach: Dani Poyatos
- Stadium: Panasonic Stadium Suita
- J1 League: 16th
- Emperor's Cup: Second round
- J.League Cup: Quarter-finals
- Top goalscorer: League: Juan Alano (7 goals); All: Dawhan and Juan Alano (7 goals each)
- Highest home attendance: 34,517 vs Cerezo Osaka (3 May; J1 League)
- Lowest home attendance: 3,059 vs Kochi United (7 June; Emperor's Cup)
- Average home league attendance: 23,273
- Biggest win: 3–0 vs FC Tokyo (5 April; J.League Cup)
- Biggest defeat: 0–4 vs Vissel Kobe (4 March; J1 League); 0–4 vs Kashima Antlers (29 April; J1 League)
Home colours	Away colours

The 2023 Gamba Osaka season was the club's 43rd season in existence and the tenth consecutive season in the top flight of Japanese football. The club finished the 2023 J1 League in 16th place, one place lower than the previous season and again narrowly avoiding relegation. They also competed in the Emperor's Cup where they were knocked out in the second round by JFL club Kochi United and the J.League Cup where they reached the quarter-finals. No team conceded more league goals than Gamba and they finished with the second-worst goal difference, only marginally better than relegated Yokohama FC.

== Players ==
=== Season squad ===
Squad no.	Name	Nationality	Position(s)	Date of birth (age at start of season)
Goalkeepers
1	Masaaki Higashiguchi	(Japan)	GK	12 May 1986 (aged 36)
25	Kei Ishikawa	(Japan)	GK	30 September 1992 (aged 30)
99	Kosei Tani	(Japan)	GK	22 November 2000 (aged 22)
-	Zhang Aolin ^{Type 2}	(China)	GK	25 May 2005 (aged 17)
Defenders
2	Shota Fukuoka	(Japan)	CB	24 October 1995 (aged 27)
3	Riku Handa	(Japan)	RB	1 January 2002 (aged 21)
4	Hiroki Fujiharu	(Japan)	LB	24 November 1988 (aged 34)
5	Genta Miura	(Japan)	CB	1 March 1995 (aged 27)
13	Ryu Takao	(Japan)	RB / CB	9 November 1996 (aged 26)
16	Yota Sato	(Japan)	CB	10 September 1998 (aged 24)
19	Ibuki Konno ^{DSP}	(Japan)	DF	10 May 2001 (aged 21)
20	Kwon Kyung-won	(South Korea)	CB	31 January 1992 (aged 31)
24	Keisuke Kurokawa	(Japan)	LB / LM	13 April 1997 (aged 25)
26	Ko Yanagisawa	(Japan)	RB	28 June 1996 (aged 26)
34	Yusei Egawa	(Japan)	CB	24 October 2000 (aged 22)
Midfielders
7	Takashi Usami (c)	(Japan)	AM / SS / FW	6 May 1992 (aged 30)
8	Ryotaro Meshino	(Japan)	LW / AM	8 June 1998 (aged 24)
10	Shu Kurata	(Japan)	LM / RM	26 November 1988 (aged 34)
14	Yuya Fukuda	(Japan)	LM / RM	4 April 1999 (aged 23)
18	Neta Lavi	(Israel)	DM / CM	25 August 1996 (aged 26)
21	Dai Tsukamoto	(Japan)	LM / FW	23 June 2001 (aged 21)
23	Dawhan	(Brazil)	DM / CM	3 June 1996 (aged 26)
27	Rin Mito ^{DSP}	(Japan)	LM	12 February 2002 (aged 21)
28	Naohiro Sugiyama	(Japan)	RW / AM	7 September 1998 (aged 24)
29	Yuki Yamamoto	(Japan)	CM	6 November 1997 (aged 25)
41	Jiro Nakamura	(Japan)	RM / AM	22 August 2003 (aged 19)
47	Juan Alano	(Brazil)	RM / AM	2 September 1996 (aged 26)
48	Hideki Ishige	(Japan)	AM / RM / LM	21 September 1994 (aged 28)
-	Daiki Miyagawa ^{Type 2}	(Japan)	MF	24 March 2006 (aged 16)
Forwards
9	Musashi Suzuki	(Japan)	FW	11 February 1994 (aged 29)
11	Issam Jebali	(Tunisia)	FW	25 December 1991 (aged 31)
37	Hiroto Yamami	(Japan)	FW / LW	16 August 1999 (aged 23)

Last updated: 10 March 2023.
Source: Gamba Osaka website

=== Transfers ===
Transfers in
Join on	Pos.	Player	Moving from	Transfer type
Pre-season	GK	(Japan) Kosei Tani	(Japan) Shonan Bellmare	Loan return
Pre-season	DF	(Japan) Riku Handa	(Japan) Montedio Yamagata	Full transfer
Pre-season	DF	(Japan) Yusei Egawa	(Japan) V-Varen Nagasaki	Full transfer
Pre-season	DF	(Japan) Yota Sato	(Japan) Vegalta Sendai	Loan return
Pre-season	DF	(Japan) Ibuki Konno	(Japan) Hosei University	Loan transfer; DSP
Pre-season	MF	(Israel) Neta Lavi	(Israel) Maccabi Haifa	Full transfer
Pre-season	MF	(Japan) Naohiro Sugiyama	(Japan) Roasso Kumamoto	Full transfer
Pre-season	MF	(Brazil) Dawhan	(Brazil) Santa Rita	Loan transfer; Loan made permanent
Pre-season	MF	(Japan) Rin Mito	(Japan) Kwansei Gakuin University	Loan transfer; DSP
Pre-season	MF	(Japan) Dai Tsukamoto	(Japan) Zweigen Kanazawa	Loan return
Pre-season	FW	(Tunisia) Issam Jebali	(Denmark) Odense Boldklub	Full transfer
Pre-season	FW	(Japan) Harumi Minamino	Gamba Osaka U18s	Promotion

Transfers out
Leave on	Pos.	Player	Moving to	Transfer type
1 Jul	MF	(Japan) Rihito Yamamoto	(Belgium) Sint-Truiden	Loan transfer
10 Mar	MF	(Japan) Kohei Okuno	(Japan) Shonan Bellmare	Loan transfer
Pre-season	GK	(Japan) Taichi Kato	–	Contract expiration
Pre-season	DF	(Japan) Gen Shoji	(Japan) Kashima Antlers	Full transfer
Pre-season	MF	(Japan) Kosuke Onose	(Japan) Shonan Bellmare	Free transfer
Pre-season	MF	(Japan) Ren Shibamoto	(Japan) Tiamo Hirakata	Free transfer
Pre-season	MF	(South Korea) Ju Se-jong	(South Korea) Daejeon Hana Citizen	Full transfer; Loan made permanent
Pre-season	MF	(Japan) Ryuta Takahashi	(Japan) Nara Club	Loan transfer
Pre-season	MF	(Japan) Mitsuki Saito	(Japan) Shonan Bellmare	Loan expiration
Pre-season	FW	(Brazil) Wellington Silva	(Brazil) Cuiabá	Free transfer
Pre-season	FW	(Brazil) Leandro Pereira	(Iran) Persepolis	Free transfer
Pre-season	FW	(Brazil) Patric	(Japan) Kyoto Sanga	Free transfer
Pre-season	FW	(Japan) Isa Sakamoto	(Japan) Fagiano Okayama	Loan transfer
Pre-season	FW	(Japan) Harumi Minamino	(Japan) Tegevajaro Miyazaki	Loan transfer

== Friendlies ==
22 July International friendly	Gamba Osaka	0–1	(Scotland) Celtic	Suita
19:03 JST		Report	Bernabei 85'	Stadium: Panasonic Stadium Suita; Attendance: 12,482

== Competitions ==
=== J1 League ===
==== League table ====
Pos	Team	Pld	W	D	L	GF	GA	GD	Pts	Qualification or relegation
14	Sagan Tosu	34	9	11	14	43	47	−4	38	
15	Shonan Bellmare	34	8	10	16	40	56	−16	34	
16	Gamba Osaka	34	9	7	18	38	61	−23	34	
17	Kashiwa Reysol	34	6	15	13	33	47	−14	33	
18	Yokohama FC (R)	34	7	8	19	31	58	−27	29	Relegation to the J2 League

Source: JLeague.jp, J.League Data Site
Rules for classification: 1) Points; 2) Goal difference; 3) Goals scored; 4) Head-to-head points; 5) Head-to-head goal difference; 6) Head-to-head goals scored; 7) Fewer disciplinary points.
(R) Relegated

==== Matches ====
18 February 1	Kashiwa Reysol	2–2	Gamba Osaka	Kashiwa
15:03 JST	Katayama (yellow card) 39' (goal) 42'; Nakamura (yellow card) 79'; Hosoya 90+8' (pen.)	Report	Handa (yellow card) 18'; Usami 49'; Dawhan 54'; Kurokawa (yellow card) 88'; Kwon Kyung-won (yellow card) 90+6'	Stadium: Sankyo Frontier Kashiwa Stadium; Attendance: 12,334; Referee: Koei Koya

25 February 2	Gamba Osaka	1–1	Sagan Tosu	Suita
15:03 JST	Suzuki 9'	Report	Kabayama 64'	Stadium: Panasonic Stadium Suita; Attendance: 25,865; Referee: Koichiro Fukushima

4 March 3	Vissel Kobe	4–0	Gamba Osaka	Kobe
14:03 JST	Osako 3'; Osaki (yellow card) 14'; Sakai 47', 73'; Muto 66'	Report	Egawa (yellow card) 13'	Stadium: Noevir Stadium Kobe; Attendance: 17,781; Referee: Masuya Ueda

12 March 4	Gamba Osaka	1–2	Sanfrecce Hiroshima	Suita
16:03 JST	Lavi (yellow card) 31'; Usami 70'	Report	Ben Khalifa 2'; Sotiriou (yellow card) 19'; Mitsuta 90+4' (pen.)	Stadium: Panasonic Stadium Suita; Attendance: 18,765; Referee: Akihiko Ikeuchi

18 March 5	Gamba Osaka	2–2	Hokkaido Consadole Sapporo	Suita
15:03 JST	Ishige 59'; Juan Alano 61'; Handa (yellow card) 66'	Report	Kobayashi 6'; Ogashiwa 32'; Nakamura (yellow card) 86'	Stadium: Panasonic Stadium Suita; Attendance: 18,550; Referee: Tom Bramall

1 April 6	Shonan Bellmare	4–1	Gamba Osaka	Hiratsuka
15:03 JST	Machino 21', 38', 40', 42'	Report	Jebali 63'	Stadium: Lemon Gas Stadium Hiratsuka; Attendance: 11,966; Referee: Yoshimi Yamashita

9 April 7	Gamba Osaka	2–0	Kawasaki Frontale	Suita
15:03 JST	Lavi (yellow card) 15'; Dawhan 29'; Jebali (yellow card) 47'; Alano 50'	Report	Kurumaya (yellow card) 52' (yellow-red card) 60'	Stadium: Panasonic Stadium Suita; Attendance: 20,734; Referee: Jumpei Iida

15 April 8	Kyoto Sanga	2–1	Gamba Osaka	Kameoka
16:03 JST	Toyokawa 22'; Ichimi (yellow card) 48'; Shirai (yellow card) 74'; Patric 82'	Report	Ishige 37'; Kwon Kyung-won (red card) 88'	Stadium: Sanga Stadium by Kyocera; Attendance: 13,463; Referee: Hayato Shimizu

23 April 9	Gamba Osaka	1–1	Yokohama FC	Suita
16:03 JST	Usami 13'; Handa (yellow card) 44'	Report	Nduka 43'; Mita (yellow card) 72'	Stadium: Panasonic Stadium Suita; Attendance: 14,577; Referee: Futoshi Nakamura

29 April 10	Kashima Antlers	4–0	Gamba Osaka	Kashima
19:03 JST	Nakama 48'; Suzuki 64'; Doi 86', 87'	Report	Kwon Kyung-won (yellow card) 32'; Lavi (yellow card) 90+5'	Stadium: Kashima Soccer Stadium; Attendance: 20,525; Referee: Yoshiro Imamura

3 May 11	Gamba Osaka	1–2	Cerezo Osaka	Suita
14:03 JST	Jebali (yellow card) 33'; Meshino (yellow card) 52'; Dawhan 56'; Usami (yellow card) 64'	Report	Matsuda (yellow card) 22'; Léo Ceará 28'; Kato 90'	Stadium: Panasonic Stadium Suita; Attendance: 34,517; Referee: Ryo Tanimoto

6 May 12	Nagoya Grampus	1–0	Gamba Osaka	Toyota
19:03 JST	Izumi (yellow card) 63'; Inagaki 67'	Report	Dawhan (yellow card) 33'; Juan Alano (yellow card) 39'; Ishige (yellow card) 56'; Usami (yellow card) 78'; Fukuoka (yellow card) 87'; Kurokawa (yellow card) 90+5'	Stadium: Toyota Stadium; Attendance: 28,613; Referee: Yudai Yamamoto

14 May 13	Urawa Red Diamonds	3–1	Gamba Osaka	Saitama
16:03 JST	Scholz 45+2' (pen.); Okubo 54'; Yasui 59'	Report	Jebali (yellow card) 2' (goal) 23'; Usami (yellow card) 29'	Stadium: Saitama Stadium 2002; Attendance: 31,440; Referee: Akihiko Ikeuchi

20 May 14	Gamba Osaka	0–2	Yokohama F. Marinos	Suita
19:03 JST	Fukuoka (yellow card) 58'; Usami (yellow card) 78'	Report	Matsubara (yellow card) 11' (yellow-red card) 59'; Nishimura 37'; Hatanaka (yellow card) 51'; Lopes (yellow card) 71'; Nagato 79'; Iikura (yellow card) 90+5'	Stadium: Panasonic Stadium Suita; Attendance: 19,823; Referee: Hiroyuki Kimura

28 May 15	Albirex Niigata	1–3	Gamba Osaka	Niigata
14:03 JST	Shimada (yellow card) 6'; Fitzgerald 48'	Report	Kurata 2'; Alano 44'; Kurokawa 56'	Stadium: Denka Big Swan Stadium; Attendance: 21,860; Referee: Masuya Ueda

3 June 16	Avispa Fukuoka	1–2	Gamba Osaka	Fukuoka
18:03 JST	Yamagishi 17'; Wellington (yellow card) 90+6'	Report	Alano 24'; Miura 32'; Sato (yellow card) 54'; Fukuoka (yellow card) 90+6'	Stadium: Best Denki Stadium; Attendance: 9,336; Referee: Koichiro Fukushima

11 June 17	Gamba Osaka	3–1	FC Tokyo	Suita
18:03 JST	Jebali 25', 29' (yellow card) 90+1'; Kurokawa (yellow card) 45+3'; Handa 60'	Report	Higashi (yellow card) 58'; Tsukagawa 90+2'	Stadium: Panasonic Stadium Suita; Attendance: 19,631; Referee: Andrew Madley (England)

24 June 18	Gamba Osaka	2–1	Kashima Antlers	Suita
19:03 JST	Kurokawa 15'; Dawhan 34'; Yamamoto (yellow card) 72'	Report	Ueda (yellow card) 59' (goal) 88'; Araki (yellow card) 65'	Stadium: Panasonic Stadium Suita; Attendance: 22,483; Referee: Futoshi Nakamura

1 July 19	Yokohama FC	0–0	Gamba Osaka	Yokohama
18:30 JST		Report	Fukuoka (yellow card) 24'	Stadium: Nippatsu Mitsuzawa Stadium; Attendance: 10,348; Referee: Koichiro Fukushima

8 July 20	Gamba Osaka	1–0	Kyoto Sanga	Suita
19:03 JST	Alano (yellow card) 42'; Fukuda 72'	Report	Hirato (yellow card) 69'	Stadium: Panasonic Stadium Suita; Attendance: 23,048; Referee: Koei Koya

16 July 21	Gamba Osaka	3–1	Kashiwa Reysol	Suita
19:00 JST	Dawhan 11'; Meshino 46'; Alano 67'	Report	Hosoya 21'	Stadium: Panasonic Stadium Suita; Attendance: 18,679; Referee: Hajime Matsuo

6 August 22	Kawasaki Frontale	3–4	Gamba Osaka	Kawasaki
19:03 JST	Wakizaka 27'; Segawa 71', 75'	Report	Ishige 13'; Jebali 30' (pen.); Alano 41'; Dawhan 90+6'	Stadium: Kawasaki Todoroki Stadium; Attendance: 20,162; Referee: Ryo Tanimoto

12 August 23	Yokohama F. Marinos	2–1	Gamba Osaka	Yokohama
19:33 JST	Yan 34'; Lopes 51' (pen.); Élber (yellow card) 45+4' (yellow-red card) 65'	Report	Meshino 44'	Stadium: Nissan Stadium; Attendance: 33,261; Referee: Akihiko Ikeuchi

19 August 24	Gamba Osaka	2–1	Shonan Bellmare	Suita
19:04 JST	Alano 37'; Usami 61' (pen.)	Report	Ohashi 90+6'	Stadium: Panasonic Stadium Suita; Attendance: 32,567; Referee: Takuto Okabe

26 August 25	Sagan Tosu	1–1	Gamba Osaka	Tosu
19:04 JST	Naganuma 61'	Report	Yamami 90+6'	Stadium: Ekimae Real Estate Stadium; Attendance: 12,812; Referee: Hayato Shimizu

1 September 26	Hokkaido Consadole Sapporo	4–0	Gamba Osaka	Sapporo
13:03 JST	Supachok 13', 59'; Kim 89'; Asano 90+2'	Report		Stadium: Sapporo Dome; Attendance: 13,219; Referee: Masuya Ueda

19 September 27	Gamba Osaka	1–1	Albirex Niigata	Suita
19:03 JST	Meshino 63'	Report	Mito 83'	Stadium: Panasonic Stadium Suita; Attendance: 19,422; Referee: Koei Koya

24 September 28	Gamba Osaka	1–3	Urawa Red Diamonds	Suita
17:04 JST	Usami 17'	Report	Kanté 29' (red card) 59'; Takahashi 68'; Linssen 85'	Stadium: Panasonic Stadium Suita; Attendance: 30,135; Referee: Yusuke Araki

1 October 29	FC Tokyo	3–0	Gamba Osaka	Tokyo
15:03 JST	Harakawa 37'; Oliveira 43'; Tawaratsumida 78'	Report		Stadium: Ajinomoto Stadium; Attendance: 30,521; Referee: Futoshi Nakamura

21 October 30	Gamba Osaka	0–1	Nagoya Grampus	Suita
14:03 JST		Report	Fujii 26'	Stadium: Panasonic Stadium Suita; Attendance: 23,153; Referee: Takuto Okabe

27 October 31	Cerezo Osaka	1–0	Gamba Osaka	Osaka
14:03 JST	Ceará 8'	Report	Lavi (yellow card) 41'; Dawhan (yellow card) 90+4'	Stadium: Yodoko Sakura Stadium; Attendance: 21,665; Referee: Yuichi Nishimura

11 November 32	Gamba Osaka	1–2	Avispa Fukuoka	Osaka
15:03	Kwon 13'	Report	Yamagishi 46'; Nara (yellow card) 61'; Lukian 89'	Stadium: Panasonic Stadium Suita; Attendance: 21,293; Referee: Akihiko Ikeuchi

24 November 33	Sanfrecce Hiroshima	3–0	Gamba Osaka	Hiroshima
14:03 JST	Mitsuta 9'; Nakano 11'; Kato 53'	Report	Kwon (yellow card) 22'; Kurokawa (yellow card) 38'	Stadium: Edion Stadium Hiroshima; Attendance: 29,097; Referee: Yoshiro Imamura

3 December 34	Gamba Osaka	0–1	Vissel Kobe	Suita
14:03 JST	Dawhan (yellow card) 45+2'; Handa (yellow card) 69'; Usami (yellow card) 89'	Report	Sakai (yellow card) 25'; Patric 56'	Stadium: Panasonic Stadium Suita; Attendance: 32,397; Referee: Futoshi Nakamura

=== Emperor's Cup ===
Gamba started the competition in the second round, as every J1 and J2 League club earned a bye from prefectural qualification.

7 June Second round	Gamba Osaka	1–2	Kochi United	Suita
19:00	Ishige (yellow card) 37'; Miura 87'	Report	Kobayashi 4'; Miura 41'	Stadium: Panasonic Stadium Suita; Attendance: 3,059; Referee: Akihiko Ikeuchi

=== J.League Cup ===
Pos	Team	Pld	W	D	L	GF	GA	GD	Pts	Qualification
1	Gamba Osaka	6	3	1	2	8	4	+4	10 (Note: Head-to-head points: Gamba Osaka 3, FC Tokyo 3. Head-to-head goal differences: Gamba Osaka +2, FC Tokyo –2.)	Advance to knockout stage
2	FC Tokyo	6	3	1	2	9	5	+4	10	Advance to knockout stage
3	Kyoto Sanga	6	3	0	3	9	11	−2	9	
4	Cerezo Osaka	6	1	2	3	2	8	−6	5	

Source: JLeague.co (EN), JLeague.jp (JA)
Rules for classification: Tiebreakers
Notes:

8 March	Kyoto Sanga	1–3	Gamba Osaka	Kameoka
19:03	Yamasaki 34'	Report	Fukuda 30'; Dawhan 42'; Ishige 79'	Stadium: Sanga Stadium by Kyocera; Attendance: 6,598; Referee: Hirokazu Otsubo

26 March	Gamba Osaka	1–1	Cerezo Osaka	Suita
15:00	Egawa (yellow card) 38'; Dawhan (yellow card) 61'; Suzuki (yellow card) 76'; Juan Alano (yellow card) 83'; Meshino 90+1'	Report	Matsuda (yellow card) 15'; Léo Ceará (yellow card) 21'; Maikuma 58'; Jonjić (yellow card) 69'	Stadium: Panasonic Stadium Suita; Attendance: 26,110; Referee: Hiroki Kasahara

5 April	Gamba Osaka	3–0	FC Tokyo	Suita
19:00	Sugiyama 43', 90+1'; Fukuda 87'	Report		Stadium: Panasonic Stadium Suita; Attendance: 6,757; Referee: Koichiro Fukushima

19 April	FC Tokyo	1–0	Gamba Osaka	Tokyo
19:00	Nagatomo (yellow card) 60'; Tsukagawa 74'; Trevisan (yellow card) 89'	Report	Yamamoto (red card) 71'	Stadium: Ajinomoto Stadium; Attendance: 8,117; Referee: Takuto Okabe

24 May	Gamba Osaka	0–1	Kyoto Sanga	Suita
19:00	Suzuki (yellow card) 14'; Fukuda (yellow card) 31'; Egawa (yellow card) 39'; Sato (yellow card) 90+4'	Report	Tawiah (yellow card) 8'; Kinoshita 19' (pen.); Hirato (yellow card) 46'; Kimura (yellow card) 79'; Ota (yellow card) 90+1'	Stadium: Panasonic Stadium Suita; Attendance: 7,804; Referee: Hiroki Kasahara

18 June	Cerezo Osaka	0–1	Gamba Osaka	Osaka
18:00	Kitano (yellow card) 43'; Nishio (yellow card) 90+1'	Report	Handa 37'	Stadium: Yodoko Sakura Stadium; Attendance: 18,061; Referee: Hiroyuki Kimura

==== Quarter-finals ====
6 September Leg 1	Gamba Osaka	0–1	Urawa Red Diamonds	Suita
19:03 JST	Sato (yellow card) 64'; Kurokawa (yellow card) 67'	Report	Schalk 46'; Hayakawa (yellow card) 53'; Niekawa (yellow card) 88'	Stadium: Panasonic Stadium Suita; Attendance: 9,363; Referee: Takafumi Mikuriya

10 September Leg 2	Urawa Red Diamonds	3–0	Gamba Osaka	Saitama
19:03 JST	Linssen 8', 63'; Iwanami (yellow card) 29'; Schalk 86'	Report	Jebali (yellow card) 28'	Stadium: Saitama Stadium 2002; Attendance: 21,467; Referee: Koichiro Fukushima

Urawa Red Diamonds won 3–2 on aggregate.

== Goalscorers ==
Rank	Pos.	No.	Player	J1 League	Emperor's Cup	J.League Cup	Total
1	MF	23	(Brazil) Dawhan	6	0	1	7
1	MF	47	(Brazil) Juan Alano	7	0	0	7
3	FW	7	(Japan) Takashi Usami	5	0	0	5
3	FW	11	(Tunisia) Issam Jebali	5	0	0	5
5	MF	8	(Japan) Ryotaro Meshino	3	0	1	4
5	MF	48	(Japan) Hideki Ishige	3	0	1	4
7	MF	14	(Japan) Yuya Fukuda	1	0	2	3
8	DF	3	(Japan) Riku Handa	1	0	1	2
8	DF	5	(Japan) Genta Miura	1	1	0	2
8	DF	24	(Japan) Keisuke Kurokawa	2	0	0	2
8	MF	28	(Japan) Naohiro Sugiyama	0	0	2	2
12	FW	9	(Japan) Musashi Suzuki	1	0	0	1
12	MF	10	(Japan) Shu Kurata	1	0	0	1
12	DF	20	(South Korea) Kwon Kyung-won	1	0	0	1
12	FW	37	(Japan) Hiroto Yamami	1	0	0	1
Total				38	1	8	47

Last updated: 3 December 2023.
Source: jleague.co
