= 2022 Gamba Osaka season =

Gamba Osaka
2022 season
- Chairman: Takashi Yamauchi
- Head coach: Tomohiro Katanosaka (until 17 August); Hiroshi Matsuda (from 17 August)
- Stadium: Panasonic Stadium Suita
- J1 League: 15th
- Emperor's Cup: Round of 16
- J.League Cup: Group stage
- Top goalscorer: League: All: Patric (8)
Home colours	Away colours
- All statistics correct as of 10 September 2022.

The 2022 Gamba Osaka season was the club's 42nd season in existence and the ninth consecutive season in the top flight of Japanese football. In addition to the domestic league, Gamba Osaka participated in this season's editions of the Emperor's Cup and the J.League Cup.

== Players ==
=== First-team squad ===
As of 14 September 2022

Note: Flags indicate national team as defined under FIFA eligibility rules; some limited exceptions apply. Players may hold more than one non-FIFA nationality.

No.	Pos.	Nation	Player
1	GK	JPN	Masaaki Higashiguchi
2	DF	JPN	Shota Fukuoka
3	DF	JPN	Gen Shoji
4	DF	JPN	Hiroki Fujiharu
5	DF	JPN	Genta Miura (captain)
6	MF	JPN	Rihito Yamamoto
8	MF	JPN	Kosuke Onose
9	FW	BRA	Leandro Pereira
10	MF	JPN	Shu Kurata
11	MF	BRA	Wellington Silva
13	DF	JPN	Ryu Takao
14	MF	JPN	Yuya Fukuda
15	MF	JPN	Mitsuki Saito (on loan from Shonan Bellmare)
17	MF	JPN	Kohei Okuno
18	FW	BRA	Patric
19	DF	JPN	Ibuki Konno ^{DSP}
20	DF	KOR	Kwon Kyung-won
21	GK	JPN	Taichi Kato

No.	Pos.	Nation	Player
22	GK	JPN	Jun Ichimori
23	MF	BRA	Dawhan (on loan from Santa Rita)
24	DF	JPN	Keisuke Kurokawa
25	GK	JPN	Kei Ishikawa
26	DF	JPN	Ko Yanagisawa
29	MF	JPN	Yuki Yamamoto
32	FW	JPN	Isa Sakamoto
37	FW	JPN	Hiroto Yamami
39	FW	JPN	Takashi Usami
40	FW	JPN	Ryotaro Meshino
41	MF	JPN	Jiro Nakamura
42	FW	JPN	Harumi Minamino ^{Type 2}
43	MF	JPN	Rikuto Kuwahara ^{Type 2}
44	GK	JPN	Yu Adachi ^{Type 2}
45	FW	JPN	Musashi Suzuki
46	DF	JPN	Yuki Yoshihara ^{Type 2}
47	MF	BRA	Juan Alano
48	MF	JPN	Hideki Ishige

=== Out on loan ===
Note: Flags indicate national team as defined under FIFA eligibility rules; some limited exceptions apply. Players may hold more than one non-FIFA nationality.

No.	Pos.	Nation	Player
6	MF	KOR	Ju Se-jong (on loan at Daejeon Hana Citizen)
16	DF	JPN	Yota Sato (on loan at Vegalta Sendai)
—	GK	JPN	Kosei Tani (on loan at Shonan Bellmare)

No.	Pos.	Nation	Player
—	MF	JPN	Ren Shibamoto (on loan at Fujieda MYFC)
—	FW	JPN	Shoji Toyama (on loan at Mito HollyHock)
—	FW	JPN	Dai Tsukamoto (on loan at Zweigen Kanazawa)

== Pre-season and friendlies ==
Win Draw Loss Fixtures

25 July 2022 Friendly	Paris Saint-Germain (France)	6–2	(Japan) Gamba Osaka	Osaka
19:00 JST (UTC+9)	Sarabia 28'; Neymar 32' (pen.), 60'; Mendes 37'; Messi 39'; Mbappé 86' (pen.)		Kurokawa 33'; Yamami 70'	Stadium: Panasonic Stadium Suita; Referee: Futoshi Nakamura (Japan)

19 November 2022 Friendly	Gamba Osaka (Japan)	2–1	(Germany) Eintracht Frankfurt	Osaka
14:00 JST (UTC+9)	Yamami 81'; Yamamoto 87'	Report	Tuta 38'	Stadium: Panasonic Stadium Suita; Attendance: 16,014; Referee: Ryo Tanimoto

== Competitions ==
=== Overall record ===
Competition	First match	Last match	Starting round	Final position	Record							
Competition	First match	Last match	Starting round	Final position	Pld	W	D	L	GF	GA	GD	Win %
J1 League	19 February 2022	5 November 2022	Matchday 1	15th place	34	9	10	15	33	44	−11	26.47
Emperor's Cup	1 June 2022	13 July 2022	Second round	Round of 16	3	2	0	1	7	5	+2	66.67
J.League Cup	23 February 2022	18 May 2022	Group stage	Group stage	6	1	2	3	8	12	−4	16.67
Total					43	12	12	19	48	61	−13	27.91

Source: Soccerway

=== J1 League ===
==== League table ====
Pos	Team	Pld	W	D	L	GF	GA	GD	Pts	Qualification or relegation
13	Vissel Kobe	34	11	7	16	35	41	−6	40	
14	Avispa Fukuoka	34	9	11	14	29	38	−9	38	
15	Gamba Osaka	34	9	10	15	33	44	−11	37	
16	Kyoto Sanga (O)	34	8	12	14	30	38	−8	36	Qualification for relegation playoffs
17	Shimizu S-Pulse (R)	34	7	12	15	44	54	−10	33	Relegation to the J2 League

Source: J.League Data Site
Rules for classification: 1) Points; 2) Goal difference; 3) Goals scored; 4) Head-to-head points; 5) Head-to-head goal difference; 6) Head-to-head goals scored; 7) Fewer disciplinary points.
(O) Play-off winners; (R) Relegated

==== Results summary ====
Overall								Home						Away					
Pld	W	D	L	GF	GA	GD	Pts	W	D	L	GF	GA	GD	W	D	L	GF	GA	GD
34	9	10	15	33	44	−11	37	4	6	7	18	21	−3	5	4	8	15	23	−8

Source: Soccerway

==== Results by round ====
Round	1	2	3	4	5	6	7	8	9	10	11	12	13	14	15	16	17	18	19	20	21	22	23	24	25	26	27	28	29	30	31	32	33	34
Ground	H	A	H	A	H	H	A	A	H	A	H	H	A	A	H	A	H	A	H	A	A	H	H	A	H	A	A	H	H	A	H	A	H	A
Result	L	W	D	D	L	W	D	D	L	L	D	W	W	L	W	L	L	L	D	L	L	L	D	W	L	L	W	L	D	L	D	W	W	D
Position	16	7	8	10	13	8	7	10	11	14	14	12	10	12	9	9	9	12	13	15	15	16	15	14	15	17	13	16	15	17	17	16	15	15

Source: Soccerway
A = Away; H = Home; W = Win; D = Draw; L = Loss

==== Matches ====
The league fixtures were announced on 21 January 2022.

19 February 2022 1	Gamba Osaka	1–3	Kashima Antlers	Suita
14:03 JST (UTC+9)	Onose 26'	Report	Ueda 20', 66'; Suzuki 30'	Stadium: Panasonic Stadium Suita; Attendance: 11,800; Referee: Yusuke Araki

26 February 2022 2	Urawa Red Diamonds	0–1	Gamba Osaka	Saitama
15:01 JST (UTC+9)		Report	Fukuda 83'	Stadium: Saitama Stadium 2002; Attendance: 16,121; Referee: Jumpei Iida

6 March 2022 3	Gamba Osaka	2–2	Kawasaki Frontale	Suita
15:03 JST (UTC+9)	Yamamoto 32'; Onose 77'	Report	Miyagi 75'; Leandro Damião 90+5'	Stadium: Panasonic Stadium Suita; Attendance: 12,703; Referee: Yudai Yamamoto

12 March 2022 4	Júbilo Iwata	1–1	Gamba Osaka	Iwata
14:03 JST (UTC+9)	Omori 15'	Report	Leandro Pereira 88'	Stadium: Yamaha Stadium; Attendance: 10,669; Referee: Takafumi Mikuriya

19 March 2022 5	Gamba Osaka	2–3	Avispa Fukuoka	Suita
14:03 JST (UTC+9)	Fukuda 82'; Leandro Pereira 90+1'	Report	Croux 10'; Tanaka 58'; Yanagisawa 81' (o.g.)	Stadium: Panasonic Stadium Suita; Attendance: 11,133; Referee: Ryuji Sato

2 April 2022 6	Gamba Osaka	3–1	Nagoya Grampus	Suita
14:03 JST (UTC+9)	Patric 26'; Miyahara 54' (o.g.); Kurokawa 62'	Report	Sento 82'	Stadium: Panasonic Stadium Suita; Attendance: 13,685; Referee: Koichiro Fukushima

6 April 2022 7	Kyoto Sanga	1–1	Gamba Osaka	Kameoka
18:33 JST (UTC+9)	Utaka 45'	Report	Dawhan 58'	Stadium: Sanga Stadium by Kyocera; Attendance: 9,869; Referee: Takuto Okabe

10 April 2022 8	Shimizu S-Pulse	1–1	Gamba Osaka	Shizuoka
13:03 JST (UTC+9)	Oh Se-hun 57'	Report	Onose 90+7'	Stadium: IAI Stadium Nihondaira; Attendance: 12,938; Referee: Hiroki Kasahara

17 April 2022 9	Gamba Osaka	0–1	Shonan Bellmare	Suita
14:03 JST (UTC+9)		Report	Yamamoto 90'	Stadium: Panasonic Stadium Suita; Attendance: 16,576; Referee: Tomohiro Inoue

29 April 2022 10	FC Tokyo	2–0	Gamba Osaka	Tokyo
19:03 JST (UTC+9)	Adaílton 38'; Leandro 65'	Report		Stadium: Japan National Stadium; Attendance: 43,125; Referee: Yuichi Nishimura

4 May 2022 11	Gamba Osaka	0–0	Consadole Sapporo	Suita
14:03 JST (UTC+9)		Report		Stadium: Panasonic Stadium Suita; Attendance: 16,082; Referee: Futoshi Nakamura

8 May 2022 12	Gamba Osaka	2–0	Vissel Kobe	Suita
14:03 JST (UTC+9)	Kwon Kyung-won 81'; Wellington Silva 90+1'	Report		Stadium: Panasonic Stadium Suita; Attendance: 26,490; Referee: Akihiko Ikeuchi

14 May 2022 13	Kashiwa Reysol	0–1	Gamba Osaka	Kashiwa
19:03 JST (UTC+9)		Report	Dawhan 71'	Stadium: Sankyo Frontier Kashiwa Stadium; Attendance: 8,817; Referee: Hayato Shimizu

21 May 2022 14	Cerezo Osaka	3–1	Gamba Osaka	Osaka
14:03 JST (UTC+9)	Taggart 58'; Okuno 66', 90+4'	Report	Yamami 33'	Stadium: Yodoko Sakura Stadium; Attendance: 18,750; Referee: Hiroyuki Kimura

29 May 2022 16	Sagan Tosu	2–1	Gamba Osaka	Tosu
17:04 JST (UTC+9)	Horigome 19'; Hwang Seok-ho 88'	Report	Yamami 58'	Stadium: Ekimae Real Estate Stadium; Attendance: 7,848; Referee: Futoshi Nakamura

18 June 2022 17	Gamba Osaka	1–2	Yokohama F. Marinos	Suita
19:03 JST (UTC+9)	Dawhan 7'	Report	Nishimura 56'; Mizunuma 61'	Stadium: Panasonic Stadium Suita; Attendance: 19,039; Referee: Akihiko Ikeuchi

26 June 2022 18	Consadole Sapporo	1–0	Gamba Osaka	Sapporo
14:03 JST (UTC+9)	Komai 51'	Report		Stadium: Sapporo Dome; Attendance: 21,599; Referee: Masuya Ueda

29 June 2022 15	Gamba Osaka	2–0	Sanfrecce Hiroshima	Suita
19:03 JST (UTC+9)	Kurokawa 36'; Sakamoto 39'	Report		Stadium: Panasonic Stadium Suita; Attendance: 6,703; Referee: Hiroki Kasahara

2 July 2022 19	Gamba Osaka	1–1	Urawa Red Diamonds	Suita
19:03 JST (UTC+9)	Saito 33'	Report	Scholz 90+2' (pen.)	Stadium: Panasonic Stadium Suita; Attendance: 18,741; Referee: Yuichi Nishimura

6 July 2022 20	Shonan Bellmare	1–0	Gamba Osaka	Hiratsuka
19:03 JST (UTC+9)	Ohashi 42'	Report		Stadium: Lemon Gas Stadium Hiratsuka; Attendance: 4,974; Referee: Yoshiro Imamura

9 July 2022 21	Kawasaki Frontale	4–0	Gamba Osaka	Kawasaki
19:03 JST (UTC+9)	Leandro Damião 6'; Marcinho 20'; Wakizaka 30'; Ienaga 36'	Report		Stadium: Kawasaki Todoroki Stadium; Attendance: 18,466; Referee: Jumpei Iida

16 July 2022 22	Gamba Osaka	1–2	Cerezo Osaka	Suita
19:03 JST (UTC+9)	Kwon Kyung-won 17'	Report	Yamada 52'; Jean Patric 90'	Stadium: Panasonic Stadium Suita; Attendance: 22,531; Referee: Ryuji Sato

30 July 2022 23	Gamba Osaka	1–1	Kyoto Sanga	Suita
19:03 JST (UTC+9)	Meshino 57'	Report	Omae 90+7' (pen.)	Stadium: Panasonic Stadium Suita; Attendance: 18,413; Referee: Hiroki Kasahara

14 August 2022 25	Gamba Osaka	0–2	Shimizu S-Pulse	Suita
19:03 JST (UTC+9)		Report	Kololli 73'; Carlinhos Júnior 86'	Stadium: Panasonic Stadium Suita; Attendance: 27,662; Referee: Yuichi Nishimura

20 August 2022 26	Sanfrecce Hiroshima	5–2	Gamba Osaka	Hiroshima
19:03 JST (UTC+9)	Ben Khalifa 11', 72', 76'; Mitsuta 82'; Matsumoto 88'	Report	Leandro Pereira 2'; Saito 37'	Stadium: Edion Stadium Hiroshima; Attendance: 15,110; Referee: Jumpei Iida

27 August 2022 27	Nagoya Grampus	0–2	Gamba Osaka	Toyota
18:03 JST (UTC+9)		Report	Patric 3'; Suzuki 87'	Stadium: Toyota Stadium; Attendance: 31,214; Referee: Hiroki Kasahara

31 August 2022 24	Avispa Fukuoka	0–1	Gamba Osaka	Fukuoka
19:03 JST (UTC+9)		Report	Patric 90+4'	Stadium: Best Denki Stadium; Attendance: 4,266; Referee: Takuto Okabe

3 September 2022 28	Gamba Osaka	0–3	Sagan Tosu	Suita
19:04 JST (UTC+9)		Report	Nishikawa 15'; Miyashiro 53'; Ono 78'	Stadium: Panasonic Stadium Suita; Attendance: 13,304; Referee: Takafumi Mikuriya

10 September 2022 29	Gamba Osaka	0–0	FC Tokyo	Suita
19:03 JST (UTC+9)		Report		Stadium: Panasonic Stadium Suita; Attendance: 19,833; Referee: Yoshiro Imamura

18 September 2022 30	Vissel Kobe	2–1	Gamba Osaka	Kobe
19:03 JST (UTC+9)	Osako 83' (pen.), 90+3'	Report	Leandro Pereira 55'	Stadium: Noevir Stadium Kobe; Attendance: 21,471; Referee: Koei Koya

1 October 2022 31	Gamba Osaka	0–0	Kashiwa Reysol	Suita
16:03 JST (UTC+9)		Report		Stadium: Panasonic Stadium Suita; Attendance: 17,689; Referee: Yudai Yamamoto

8 October 2022 32	Yokohama F. Marinos	0–2	Gamba Osaka	Yokohama
14:03 JST (UTC+9)		Report	Juan Alano 8'; Patric 79'	Stadium: Nissan Stadium; Attendance: 32,516; Referee: Ryo Tanimoto

29 October 2022 33	Gamba Osaka	2–0	Júbilo Iwata	Suita
15:03 JST (UTC+9)	Meshino 66'; Patric 73'	Report		Stadium: Panasonic Stadium Suita; Attendance: 27,988; Referee: Hajime Matsuo

5 November 2022 34	Kashima Antlers	0–0	Gamba Osaka	Kashima
14:03 JST (UTC+9)		Report		Stadium: Kashima Soccer Stadium; Attendance: 21,575; Referee: Hayato Shimizu

=== Emperor's Cup ===
1 June 2022 Second round	Gamba Osaka	4–2 (a.e.t.)	FC Gifu	Suita
19:00 JST (UTC+9)	Wellington 21'; Okuno 47'; Patric 102'; Fujiharu 113'	Report	Togashi 8'; Murata 14'	Stadium: Panasonic Stadium Suita; Attendance: 3,035; Referee: Koichiro Fukushima

22 June 2022 Third round	Gamba Osaka	3–1	Oita Trinita	Oita
19:00 JST (UTC+9)	Yamami 49'; Patric 66', 89'	Report	Goya 14'	Stadium: Showa Denko Dome Oita; Attendance: 2,012; Referee: Takuto Okabe

13 July 2022 Round of 16	Kashima Antlers	2–0	Gamba Osaka	Kashima
19:00 JST (UTC+9)	Pituca 71'; Everaldo 75'	Report		Stadium: Kashima Soccer Stadium; Attendance: 3,663; Referee: Akihiko Ikeuchi

=== J.League Cup ===
==== Group stage ====
Pos	Team	Pld	W	D	L	GF	GA	GD	Pts	Qualification
1	Kashima Antlers	6	4	1	1	16	7	+9	13	Advance to play-off stage
2	Cerezo Osaka	6	3	2	1	14	9	+5	11	Advance to play-off stage
3	Gamba Osaka	6	1	2	3	8	12	−4	5	
4	Oita Trinita	6	0	3	3	9	19	−10	3	

Source: JLeague.co (EN), JLeague.jp (JA)
Rules for classification: Tiebreakers

23 February 2022 1	Gamba Osaka	2–3	Cerezo Osaka	Suita
14:03 JST (UTC+9)	Yamamoto 59'; Yanagisawa 74'	JLeague.co (EN); JLeague.jp (JA)	Tameda 7'; Uejo 41'; Nakahara 84'	Stadium: Panasonic Stadium Suita; Attendance: 10,509; Referee: Akihiko Ikeuchi

2 March 2022 2	Oita Trinita	2–2	Gamba Osaka	Ōita
19:03 JST (UTC+9)	Nagasawa 11', 45+1'	JLeague.co (EN); JLeague.jp (JA)	Okuno 43' (pen.); Patric 63'	Stadium: Showa Denko Dome Oita; Attendance: 3,785; Referee: Hiroyuki Kimura

26 March 2022 3	Kashima Antlers	4–1	Gamba Osaka	Kashima
15:03 JST (UTC+9)	Misao 52'; Suzuki 66'; Sekigawa 73'; Someno 90'	JLeague.co (EN); JLeague.jp (JA)	Patric 4'	Stadium: Kashima Soccer Stadium; Attendance: 6,260; Referee: Hayato Shimizu

13 April 2022 4	Gamba Osaka	2–0	Oita Trinita	Suita
19:03 JST (UTC+9)	Fujiharu 13'; Sato 58'	JLeague.co (EN); JLeague.jp (JA)		Stadium: Panasonic Stadium Suita; Attendance: 4,413; Referee: Masuya Ueda

23 April 2022 5	Cerezo Osaka	0–0	Gamba Osaka	Osaka
14:03 JST (UTC+9)		JLeague.co (EN); JLeague.jp (JA)		Stadium: Yodoko Sakura Stadium; Attendance: 12,058; Referee: Yoshiro Imamura

18 May 2022 6	Gamba Osaka	1–3	Kashima Antlers	Suita
19:03 JST (UTC+9)	Miura 78'	JLeague.co (EN); JLeague.jp (JA)	Ueda 16'; Doi 58', 80'	Stadium: Panasonic Stadium Suita; Attendance: 4,254; Referee: Jumpei Iida

== Goalscorers ==
Rank	Pos.	No.	Player	J1 League	Emperor's Cup	J.League Cup	Total
1	FW	18	(Brazil) Patric	5	3	2	10
2	FW	9	(Brazil) Leandro Pereira	4	0	0	4
3	MF	8	(Japan) Kosuke Onose	3	0	0	3
3	MF	23	(Brazil) Dawhan	3	0	0	3
3	FW	37	(Japan) Hiroto Yamami	2	1	0	3
6	MF	14	(Japan) Yuya Fukuda	2	0	0	2
6	MF	15	(Japan) Mitsuki Saito	2	0	0	2
6	DF	20	(South Korea) Kwon Kyung-won	2	0	0	2
6	DF	24	(Japan) Keisuke Kurokawa	2	0	0	2
6	FW	40	(Japan) Ryotaro Meshino	2	0	0	2
6	MF	47	(Brazil) Juan Alano	2	0	0	2
6	FW	11	(Brazil) Wellington Silva	1	1	0	2
6	MF	29	(Japan) Yuki Yamamoto	1	0	1	2
6	DF	4	(Japan) Hiroki Fujiharu	0	1	1	2
6	MF	17	(Japan) Kohei Okuno	0	1	1	2
16	FW	32	(Japan) Isa Sakamoto	1	0	0	1
16	FW	45	(Japan) Musashi Suzuki	1	0	0	1
16	DF	5	(Japan) Genta Miura	0	0	1	1
16	DF	16	(Japan) Yota Sato	0	0	1	1
16	DF	26	(Japan) Ko Yanagisawa	0	0	1	1
