= SW Ursae Majoris =

Variable star in the constellation Ursa Major

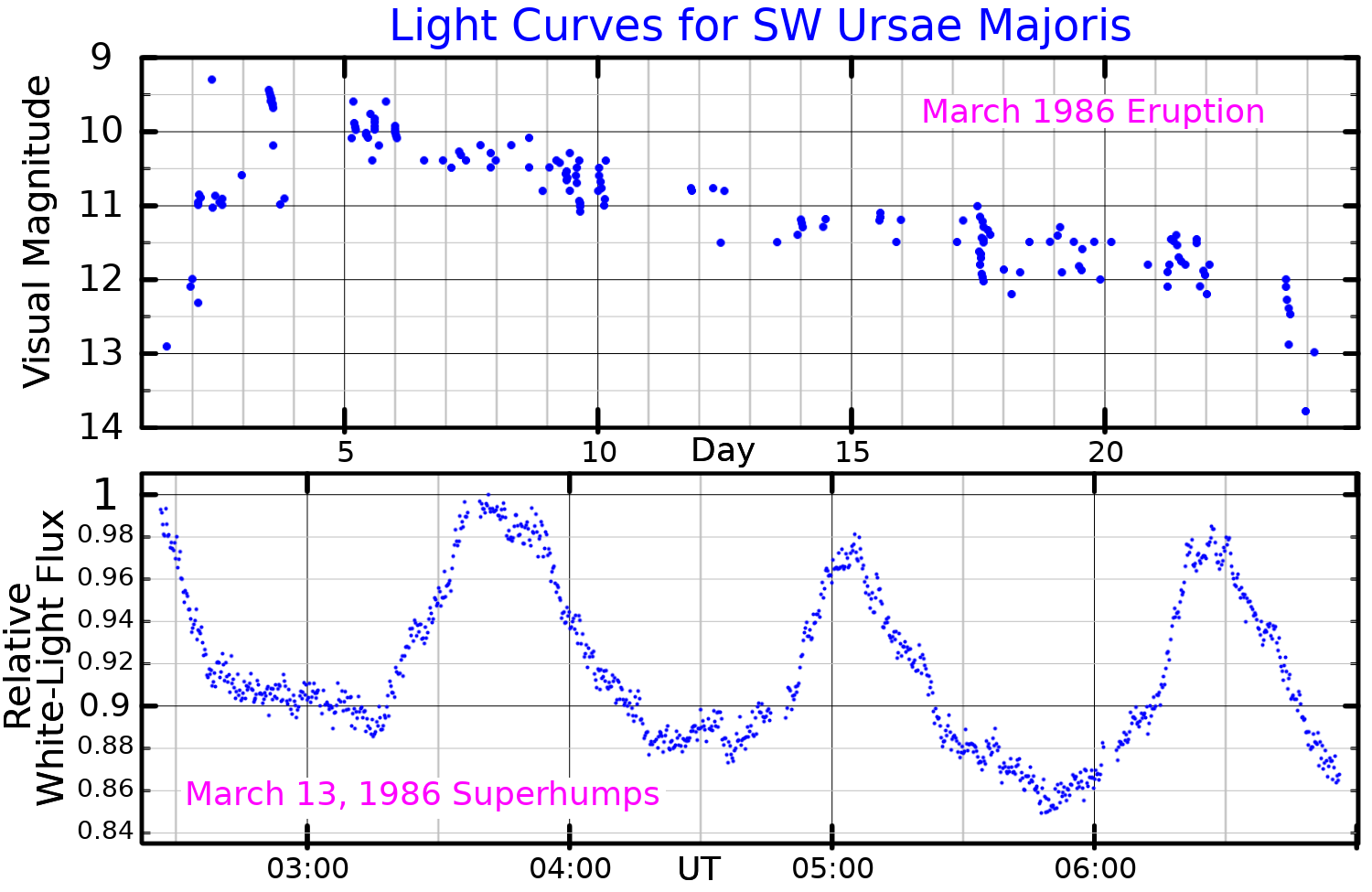
- Light curves for SW Ursae Majoris, adapted from Robinson et al. (1987)

Observation data Epoch J2000 Equinox ICRS
- Constellation: Ursa Major
- Right ascension: 08^{h} 36^{m} 42.749^{s}
- Declination: +53° 28′ 37.98″
- Apparent magnitude (V): 9.7 to 16.5

Characteristics
- Variable type: U Gem

Astrometry
Proper motion (μ)	RA: −28.713 mas/yr Dec.: 5.928 mas/yr
Parallax (π)	6.2002±0.0602 mas
Distance	526 ± 5 ly (161 ± 2 pc)
Absolute magnitude (M_{V})	+4.9 (at maximum)

Details

White dwarf
Mass	0.61^{+0.06}_{−0.04} M_{☉}
Radius	0.0129^{+0.0009}_{−0.0010} R_{☉}
Surface gravity (log g)	8.01^{+0.11}_{−0.09} cgs
Temperature	13,854^{+189}_{−131} K

donor
Mass	0.1 M_{☉}
Luminosity	0.001 L_{☉}

Other designations
- SW UMa, 2MASS J08364276+5328378

Database references
SIMBAD	data

SW Ursae Majoris is a cataclysmic binary star system in the northern circumpolar constellation of Ursa Major, abbreviated SW UMa. During quiescence it has an apparent visual magnitude of 16.5–17, which is too faint to be visible to the naked eye. Based on parallax measurements, it is located at a distance of approximately 526 light years from the Sun.

The variable nature of this object was noted by L. Tseraskaya in 1909 when it increased in brightness to 10th magnitude. It was determined to be a U Geminorum star, indicating this is a binary star system. A short orbital period of 81.8 minutes was determined by A. W. Shafter and associates in 1986. The same year, E. L. Robinson and associates detected superhumps with a period of 84.0 minutes. Large amplitude quasi-periodic oscillations were observed by T. Kato and associates in 1992, which is a property of SU UMa-type dwarf novae.

When the system is in a quiet period, it displays a periodicity of 15.9 minutes and has a marginal emission of soft X-rays. This is likely the rotation period of the white dwarf, and the system resembles an intermediate polar with a strongly-magnetized white dwarf as the accreting component. It undergoes outbursts that vary in brightness and duration. During quiescence, it is estimated that about 70% of the bolometric luminosity of the system is produced by the white dwarf, with almost all the rest produced by the accretion disk.
