= Jun Ichimori =

Japanese footballer

Jun Ichimori 一森 純
Personal information
- Full name: Jun Ichimori
- Date of birth: July 2, 1991 (age 35)
- Place of birth: Izumisano, Osaka, Japan
- Height: 1.82 m (6 ft 0 in)
- Position: Goalkeeper

Team information
- Current team: Gamba Osaka
- Number: 22

Youth career
- 2007–2009: Cerezo Osaka

College career
Years	Team	Apps	(Gls)
2010–2013	Kwansei Gakuin University		

Senior career*
Years	Team	Apps	(Gls)
2014–2016	Renofa Yamaguchi	92	(0)
2017–2019	Fagiano Okayama	90	(0)
2020–	Gamba Osaka	85	(0)
2023	→ Yokohama F. Marinos (loan)	27	(0)
- * Club domestic league appearances and goals as of 9 August 2026

Jun Ichimori (一森 純, Ichimori Jun; born July 2, 1991) is a Japanese footballer who plays as a goalkeeper for J1 League club Gamba Osaka.

== Career ==
Ichimori grew up in the Cerezo Osaka youth ranks, alongside players like Takahiro Ogihara and Ryo Nagai. After failing to get to the first squad, he decided to join Kwansei Gakuin University Soccer Club as a regular student.

In May 2014, Ichimori joined JFL-side Renofa Yamaguchi. He gradually gained a starter-spot as goalkeeper: his displays were so good he was chosen as one of the best players in 2014 season. In the club's first season in J3, Ichimori played all the games and contributed to win the league.

== Career statistics ==
As of match played 6 June 2026.

Appearances and goals by club, season and competition
Club	Season	League			Cup		League cup		Asia		Other		Total	
Club	Season	Division	Apps	Goals	Apps	Goals	Apps	Goals	Apps	Goals	Apps	Goals	Apps	Goals
Renofa Yamaguchi	2014	JFL	26	0	—		—		—		—		26	0
Renofa Yamaguchi	2015	J3 League	36	0	0	0	—		—		—		36	0
Renofa Yamaguchi	2016	J2 League	30	0	2	0	—		—		—		32	0
Renofa Yamaguchi	Total		92	0	2	0	—		—		—		94	0
Fagiano Okayama	2017	J2 League	36	0	0	0	—		—		—		36	0
Fagiano Okayama	2018	J2 League	20	0	0	0	—		—		—		20	0
Fagiano Okayama	2019	J2 League	34	0	0	0	—		—		—		34	0
Fagiano Okayama	Total		90	0	0	0	—		—		—		90	0
Gamba Osaka	2020	J1 League	0	0	0	0	0	0	—		—		0	0
Gamba Osaka	2021	J1 League	0	0	0	0	0	0	0	0	0	0	0	0
Gamba Osaka	2022	J1 League	9	0	0	0	2	0	—		—		11	0
Gamba Osaka	2024	J1 League	38	0	5	0	1	0	—		—		44	0
Gamba Osaka	2025	J1 League	37	0	2	0	0	0	0	0	—		39	0
Gamba Osaka	2026	J1 (100)	1	0	—		—		0	0	—		1	0
Gamba Osaka	Total		85	0	7	0	3	0	0	0	0	0	95	0
Yokohama F. Marinos (loan)	2023	J1 League	27	0	0	0	7	0	5	0	—		39	0
Career total			294	0	9	0	10	0	5	0	0	0	318	0

== Honours ==
Gamba Osaka

- AFC Champions League Two: 2025–26
