= 2007 Gamba Osaka season =

Gamba Osaka
2007 season
- Manager: Akira Nishino
- Stadium: Osaka Expo '70 Stadium
- J. League 1: 3rd
- Emperor's Cup: Semifinals
- J. League Cup: Champions
- Top goalscorer: Baré (20)

2007 Gamba Osaka season

== Competitions ==
Competitions	Position
J. League 1	3rd / 18 clubs
Emperor's Cup	Semifinals
J. League Cup	Champions

== Domestic results ==
=== J. League 1 ===
Match	Date	Venue	Opponents	Score
1	2007..	[[]]	[[]]	-
2	2007..	[[]]	[[]]	-
3	2007..	[[]]	[[]]	-
4	2007..	[[]]	[[]]	-
5	2007..	[[]]	[[]]	-
6	2007..	[[]]	[[]]	-
7	2007..	[[]]	[[]]	-
8	2007..	[[]]	[[]]	-
9	2007..	[[]]	[[]]	-
10	2007..	[[]]	[[]]	-
11	2007..	[[]]	[[]]	-
12	2007..	[[]]	[[]]	-
13	2007..	[[]]	[[]]	-
14	2007..	[[]]	[[]]	-
15	2007..	[[]]	[[]]	-
16	2007..	[[]]	[[]]	-
17	2007..	[[]]	[[]]	-
18	2007..	[[]]	[[]]	-
19	2007..	[[]]	[[]]	-
20	2007..	[[]]	[[]]	-
21	2007..	[[]]	[[]]	-
22	2007..	[[]]	[[]]	-
23	2007..	[[]]	[[]]	-
24	2007..	[[]]	[[]]	-
25	2007..	[[]]	[[]]	-
26	2007..	[[]]	[[]]	-
27	2007..	[[]]	[[]]	-
28	2007..	[[]]	[[]]	-
29	2007..	[[]]	[[]]	-
30	2007..	[[]]	[[]]	-
31	2007..	[[]]	[[]]	-
32	2007..	[[]]	[[]]	-
33	2007..	[[]]	[[]]	-
34	2007..	[[]]	[[]]	-

=== Emperor's Cup ===
Match	Date	Venue	Opponents	Score
4th Round	2007..	[[]]	[[]]	-
5th Round	2007..	[[]]	[[]]	-
Quarterfinals	2007..	[[]]	[[]]	-
Semifinals	2007..	[[]]	[[]]	-

=== J. League Cup ===
Match	Date	Venue	Opponents	Score
GL-A-1	2007..	[[]]	[[]]	-
GL-A-2	2007..	[[]]	[[]]	-
GL-A-3	2007..	[[]]	[[]]	-
GL-A-4	2007..	[[]]	[[]]	-
GL-A-5	2007..	[[]]	[[]]	-
GL-A-6	2007..	[[]]	[[]]	-
Quarterfinals-1	2007..	[[]]	[[]]	-
Quarterfinals-2	2007..	[[]]	[[]]	-
Semifinals-1	2007..	[[]]	[[]]	-
Semifinals-2	2007..	[[]]	[[]]	-
Final	2007..	[[]]	[[]]	-

== Player statistics ==
No.	Pos.	Player	D.o.B. (Age)	Height / Weight	J. League 1		Emperor's Cup		J. League Cup		Total	
No.	Pos.	Player	D.o.B. (Age)	Height / Weight	Apps	Goals	Apps	Goals	Apps	Goals	Apps	Goals
1	GK	Naoki Matsuyo	April 9, 1974 (aged 32)	cm / kg	6	0						
2	DF	Sota Nakazawa	October 26, 1982 (aged 24)	cm / kg	2	0						
3	DF	Toru Irie	July 8, 1977 (aged 29)	cm / kg	2	0						
4	DF	Noritada Saneyoshi	October 19, 1972 (aged 34)	cm / kg	1	0						
5	DF	Sidiclei	May 13, 1972 (aged 34)	cm / kg	33	2						
6	DF	Satoshi Yamaguchi	April 17, 1978 (aged 28)	cm / kg	33	3						
7	MF	Yasuhito Endō	January 28, 1980 (aged 27)	cm / kg	34	8						
8	MF	Akihiro Ienaga	June 13, 1986 (aged 20)	cm / kg	27	2						
9	FW	Magno Alves	January 13, 1976 (aged 31)	cm / kg	22	10						
10	MF	Takahiro Futagawa	June 27, 1980 (aged 26)	cm / kg	34	7						
11	FW	Ryūji Bando	August 2, 1979 (aged 27)	cm / kg	31	9						
13	DF	Michihiro Yasuda	December 20, 1987 (aged 19)	cm / kg	29	0						
14	FW	Shoki Hirai	December 4, 1987 (aged 19)	cm / kg	0	0						
15	DF	Ryota Aoki	August 19, 1984 (aged 22)	cm / kg	4	0						
16	MF	Masafumi Maeda	January 25, 1983 (aged 24)	cm / kg	5	1						
17	MF	Tomokazu Myojin	January 24, 1978 (aged 29)	cm / kg	33	2						
18	FW	Baré	January 18, 1982 (aged 25)	cm / kg	31	20						
19	FW	Satoshi Nakayama	November 7, 1981 (aged 25)	cm / kg	5	0						
20	MF	Shinichi Terada	June 10, 1985 (aged 21)	cm / kg	21	2						
21	DF	Akira Kaji	January 13, 1980 (aged 27)	cm / kg	28	1						
22	GK	Yosuke Fujigaya	February 13, 1981 (aged 26)	cm / kg	28	0						
24	MF	Shigeru Yokotani	May 3, 1987 (aged 19)	cm / kg	0	0						
25	FW	Hideya Okamoto	May 18, 1987 (aged 19)	cm / kg	0	0						
26	DF	Hirotada Ito	December 5, 1987 (aged 19)	cm / kg	0	0						
27	MF	Hideo Hashimoto	May 21, 1979 (aged 27)	cm / kg	34	3						
28	DF	Ryujiro Ueda	January 29, 1988 (aged 19)	cm / kg	0	0						
29	GK	Atsushi Kimura	May 1, 1984 (aged 22)	cm / kg	0	0						
30	DF	Takumi Shimohira	October 6, 1988 (aged 18)	cm / kg	3	0						
31	MF	Shu Kurata	November 26, 1988 (aged 18)	cm / kg	6	0						
32	FW	Kenta Hoshihara	May 1, 1988 (aged 18)	cm / kg	0	0						
33	MF	Shinya Tamaoki	October 8, 1988 (aged 18)	cm / kg	0	0						

== Other pages ==
- (in Japanese) J. League official site
