= Shu Kurata =

Japanese footballer (born 1988)

Shu Kurata 倉田 秋
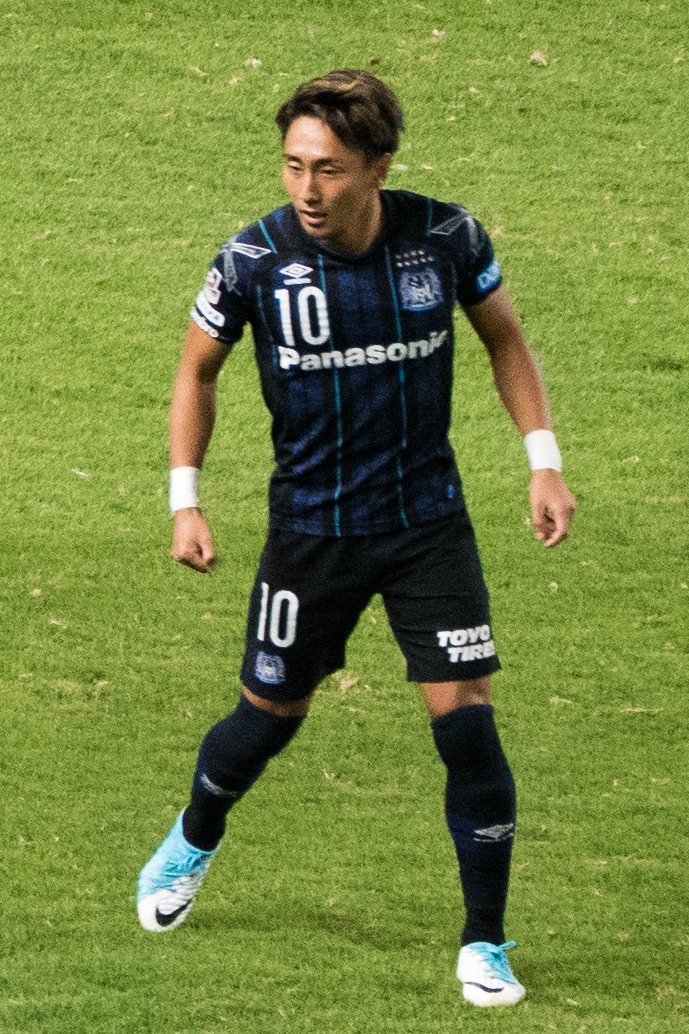
- Kurata with Gamba Osaka in 2017

Personal information
- Full name: Shu Kurata
- Date of birth: 26 November 1988 (age 37)
- Place of birth: Takatsuki, Osaka, Japan
- Height: 1.72 m (5 ft 8 in)
- Positions: Attacking midfielder; winger

Team information
- Current team: Gamba Osaka
- Number: 10

Youth career
- 2001–2006: Gamba Osaka

Senior career*
Years	Team	Apps	(Gls)
2007–	Gamba Osaka	437	(58)
2010	→ JEF United Chiba (loan)	29	(8)
2011	→ Cerezo Osaka (loan)	33	(10)

International career^{‡}
2015–2017	Japan	9	(2)
Medal record
Gamba Osaka
Winner	AFC Champions League	2008
Winner	J1 League	2014
Runner-up	J1 League	2015
Winner	J.League Cup	2007
Winner	J.League Cup	2014
Runner-up	J.League Cup	2015
Runner-up	J.League Cup	2016
Winner	Emperor's Cup	2008
Winner	Emperor's Cup	2009
Winner	Emperor's Cup	2014
Winner	Emperor's Cup	2015
Runner-up	Emperor's Cup	2012
- * Club domestic league appearances and goals as of 9 August 2026 ‡ National team caps and goals as of 17 December 2017

Shu Kurata (倉田 秋, Kurata Shū; born November 26, 1988) is a Japanese international football player currently playing for Gamba Osaka in the J1 League. His regular playing position is an attacking midfielder or a winger.

== Club career ==
A native of Osaka, Kurata came up through the youth team ranks at Gamba Osaka and made his way into the first-team squad ahead of the 2007 season. Owing to his tender years, he played just 6 league matches in his debut season as a professional, but the following year he went on to make 21 appearances in all competitions as Gamba lifted the 2008 AFC Champions League and the 2008 Emperor's Cup. The Osaka giants retained their Emperor's Cup title in 2009, however Kurata only featured 4 times throughout the year as he struggled to break into their star-studded starting line-up.

To gain more first-team experience he was sent out on loan, first to J2 League side JEF United in 2010 and then to city rivals Cerezo Osaka in 2011. He netted an impressive 10 goals in 33 league games with Cerezo and this form was enough to earn him a recall to Gamba's first-team in 2012. His first season back in north Osaka saw Gamba finish 17th in the J1 League which sent them down to Japan's second tier for the first time in their history. Kurata netted 8 times in 28 J2 appearances in 2013 as Gamba bounced back at the first time of asking, securing the league title with 87 points from 42 games.

2014 was a dream for Gamba as not only did they return to Japan's top flight but they also helped themselves to a domestic treble; lifting the J1 title as well as the J.League Cup and Emperor's Cup. Kurata scored 11 goals in 47 appearances in all competitions, a personal best for him in the blue and black of Gamba. The men from Suita added the 2015 Japanese Super Cup and 2015 Emperor's Cup titles to their haul from the previous year, defeating Urawa Red Diamonds in the final of both competitions, and also reached the semi-finals of the AFC Champions League before going down to Chinese side Guangzhou Evergrande over two legs. Kurata played 55 times in all competitions and found the back of the net on 8 occasions.

Gamba failed to lift any silverware between 2016 and 2018, however Kurata remained an integral part of the side, missing just 4 league games across the 3 seasons and scoring 14 times.

== International career ==
On 23 July 2015, Japan's coach Vahid Halilhodžić called him up for the upcoming 2015 EAFF East Asian Cup. He earned his first international cap in a 1–1 draw with China on August 5. His next national team involvement would come as a second-half substitute in Japan's 2–0 victory away to the United Arab Emirates in March 2017. He followed that up by playing both games in Japan's double header against Syria and Iraq in June with both matches finishing 1-1.

October 2017 would prove to be a high point in his international career as he scored in both the 2-1 friendly victory over New Zealand on October 6 and the 3–3 draw at home to Haiti 4 days later.

He was named in the squad for the 2017 EAFF E-1 Football Championship in December 2017 and started all 3 of Japan's games; the victories over North Korea and China as well as the 4–1 defeat to South Korea in the decisive match of the tournament which saw Japan finish as runners-up.

== Club statistics ==
As of 11 January 2025.

Club performance			League		Cup		League Cup		Continental		Other^{1}		Total	
Season	Club	League	Apps	Goals	Apps	Goals	Apps	Goals	Apps	Goals	Apps	Goals	Apps	Goals
Japan			League		Emperor's Cup		League Cup		Asia				Total	
2007	Gamba Osaka	J1 League	6	0	0	0	2	0	-		-		8	0
2008	Gamba Osaka	J1 League	13	0	4	0	2	0	3	0	1	0	23	0
2009	Gamba Osaka	J1 League	3	0	0	0	0	0	1	0	-		4	0
Total			22	0	4	0	4	0	4	0	1	0	35	0
2010	JEF United Chiba	J2 League	29	8	3	1	-		-		-		32	9
Total			29	8	3	1	-		-		-		32	9
2011	Cerezo Osaka	J1 League	33	10	4	0	1	0	9	1	-		47	11
Total			33	10	4	0	1	0	9	1	-		47	11
2012	Gamba Osaka	J1 League	31	7	4	1	2	0	3	1	-		40	9
2013	Gamba Osaka	J2 League	28	8	1	0	-		-		-		29	8
2014	Gamba Osaka	J1 League	30	6	6	3	11	2	-		-		47	11
2015	Gamba Osaka	J1 League	31	5	4	1	4	0	11	2	5	0	55	8
2016	Gamba Osaka	J1 League	34	2	2	0	5	0	5	0	1	0	47	2
2017	Gamba Osaka	J1 League	33	8	2	0	2	0	6	0	-		42	8
2018	Gamba Osaka	J1 League	31	4	1	0	6	0	-		-		38	4
2019	Gamba Osaka	J1 League	31	7	1	0	8	3	-		-		40	10
2020	Gamba Osaka	J1 League	34	4	2	0	2	0	-		-		38	4
2021	Gamba Osaka	J1 League	37	1	3	1	2	0	6	1	1	0	49	3
2022	Gamba Osaka	J1 League	18	0	2	0	3	0	-		-		23	0
2023	Gamba Osaka	J1 League	17	1	0	0	4	0	-		-		21	1
2024	Gamba Osaka	J1 League	25	1	4	0	1	0					30	1
Total			380	54	32	6	50	2	31	4	7	0	500	69
Career total			464	72	43	7	55	5	44	5	8	0	614	89

^{1} includes FIFA Club World Cup appearances and ^{2} includes J. League Championship, Japanese Super Cup and Suruga Bank Championship appearances.

== National team statistics ==
Japan national team
Year	Apps	Goals
2015	1	0
2016	0	0
2017	8	2
Total	9	2

=== International goals ===
Scores and results list Japan's goal tally first.

No	Date	Venue	Opponent	Score	Result	Competition
1.	6 October 2017	Toyota Stadium, Toyota, Japan	New Zealand	2–1	2–1	2017 Kirin Challenge Cup
2.	10 October 2017	International Stadium Yokohama, Yokohama, Japan	Haiti	1–0	3–3	2017 Kirin Challenge Cup

== Honours ==
Updated to 2018 season.

- AFC Champions League - 2008
- AFC Champions League Two: 2025–26
- Pan-Pacific Championship - 2008
- J. League Division 1 - 2014
- J. League Division 2 - 2013
- Emperor's Cup - 2008, 2009, 2014, 2015
- J. League Cup - 2007, 2014
- Japanese Super Cup - 2015
