= Genta Miura =

Japanese footballer

Genta Miura 三浦 弦太
Personal information
- Full name: Genta Miura
- Date of birth: 1 March 1995 (age 31)
- Place of birth: Toyohashi, Aichi, Japan
- Height: 1.83 m (6 ft 0 in)
- Position: Centre back

Team information
- Current team: Gamba Osaka
- Number: 5

Youth career
- 2010–2012: Osaka Toin High School

Senior career*
Years	Team	Apps	(Gls)
2013–2016	Shimizu S-Pulse	45	(0)
2017–	Gamba Osaka	236	(8)

International career^{‡}
2017–	Japan	10	(1)
Medal record
Representing Japan
AFC Asian Cup
Silver medal – second place	2019 United Arab Emirates
- * Club domestic league appearances and goals as of 9 August 2026 ‡ National team caps and goals as of 18 December 2019

Genta Miura (三浦 弦太, Miura Genta; born 1 March 1995 in Toyohashi) is a Japanese footballer who is the captain of J1 League side Gamba Osaka. He is also a Japanese international and his regular playing position is centre back.

== Club career ==
Born in Toyohashi in Aichi, central Japan, Miura moved to Osaka during his high school years. After graduating from Osaka Toin High School, he was signed by J1 side Shimizu S-Pulse on 2013.

Miura played in 16 league matches across his first 3 seasons in Shizuoka before establishing himself as a regular in 2016 following the club's relegation to Japan's second tier. He played 29 J2 matches to help S-Pulse to 2nd place in the final standings and promotion back to Japan's top flight.

His performances for Shimizu brought him to the attention of Gamba Osaka who signed him ahead of the 2017 season. Miura played in all 34 league games as well as 11 in the cup in his first season in Osaka. Gamba changed head coaches ahead of the 2018 campaign with Brazilian Levir Culpi taking over from the long-serving Kenta Hasegawa and he named Miura as his captain, taking over the role from veteran Yasuhito Endō.

Miura once again played every league game in 2018 which would prove to be a disappointing year for Gamba who struggled badly in the first half of the year under Culpi's leadership but improved markedly towards the end of the campaign under new head-coach Tsuneyasu Miyamoto, eventually ending up in 9th place in the final standings.

== National Team career ==
Miura earned his first call up to Japan's national team, then managed by Vahid Halilhodžić, ahead of the 2017 EAFF E-1 Football Championship and debuted in the 2–1 win over China on 12 December. He also played in the 4–1 defeat to South Korea 4 days later which saw Japan finish as runners-up in the tournament.

His next international involvement came in September 2018 under new national team coach Hajime Moriyasu. Miura played the full 90 minutes of a 3–0 home friendly win over Costa Rica and subsequently featured in the 4–3 victory over Uruguay in October and the 4–0 rout of Kyrgyzstan in November.

Miura was named in Japan's squad for the 2019 AFC Asian Cup in the United Arab Emirates. He played one game at the tournament, the 2–1 victory over Uzbekistan on 17 January 2019.

== Career statistics ==
=== Club ===
As of match played 30 May 2026

Appearances and goals by club, season and competition
Club	Season	League			Emperor's Cup		J.League Cup		Asia		Other		Total	
Club	Season	Division	Apps	Goals	Apps	Goals	Apps	Goals	Apps	Goals	Apps	Goals	Apps	Goals
Shimizu S-Pulse	2013	J. League Division 1	2	0	0	0	1	0	—		—		3	0
Shimizu S-Pulse	2014	J. League Division 1	7	0	1	0	0	0	—		—		8	0
Shimizu S-Pulse	2015	J1 League	7	0	0	0	3	0	—		—		10	0
Shimizu S-Pulse	2016	J2 League	29	0	2	0	—		—		—		31	0
Shimizu S-Pulse	Total		45	0	3	0	4	0	—		—		52	0
J.League U-22 Selection	2014	J3 League	8	1	—		—		—		—		8	1
J.League U-22 Selection	2015	J3 League	3	0	—		—		—		—		3	0
J.League U-22 Selection	Total		11	1	—		—		—		—		11	1
Gamba Osaka	2017	J1 League	34	2	2	0	2	0	7 (Note: Appearance(s) in AFC Champions League)	1	—		45	3
Gamba Osaka	2018	J1 League	34	0	1	1	6	0	—		—		41	1
Gamba Osaka	2019	J1 League	31	1	1	0	9	2	—		—		41	3
Gamba Osaka	2020	J1 League	20	2	2	0	2	0	—		—		24	2
Gamba Osaka	2021	J1 League	26	0	1	0	2	0	5	0	1 (Note: Appearance(s) in Japanese Super Cup)	0	35	0
Gamba Osaka	2022	J1 League	33	0	2	0	4	1	—		—		39	1
Gamba Osaka	2023	J1 League	25	1	1	1	4	0	—		—		30	2
Gamba Osaka	2024	J1 League	9	1	0	0	0	0	—		—		30	2
Gamba Osaka	2025	J1 League	8	0	2	0	1	0	6 (Note: Appearance(s) in AFC Champions League Two)	0	—		17	0
Gamba Osaka	2026	J1 (100)	16	1	—		—		6	1	—		22	2
Gamba Osaka	Total		236	8	12	2	30	3	24	2	1	0	303	15
Career total			292	9	15	2	34	3	24	2	1	0	366	16

=== International ===
Last Update: 18 December 2019

Japan national team
Year	Apps	Goals
2017	2	0
2018	3	0
2019	5	1
Total	10	1

=== International goals ===
Scores and results list Japan's goal tally first.

No	Date	Venue	Opponent	Score	Result	Competition
1.	10 December 2019	Busan Gudeok Stadium, Busan, South Korea	China	2–0	2–1	2019 EAFF E-1 Football Championship

== Honours ==
Gamba Osaka

- AFC Champions League Two: 2025–26
