= Wellington Silva (footballer, born 1993) =

Brazilian footballer

Personal information
- Full name: Wellington Alves da Silva
- Date of birth: 6 January 1993 (age 33)
- Place of birth: Rio de Janeiro, Brazil
- Height: 1.73 m (5 ft 8 in)
- Position: Winger

Team information
- Current team: Chengdu Rongcheng
- Number: 11

Youth career
- –2004: Portuguesa-RJ
- 2004–2010: Fluminense

Senior career*
Years	Team	Apps	(Gls)
2009–2010	Fluminense	11	(1)
2010–2016	Arsenal	0	(0)
2011	→ Levante (loan)	2	(0)
2011–2012	→ Alcoyano (loan)	16	(3)
2012–2013	→ Ponferradina (loan)	20	(3)
2013–2014	→ Murcia (loan)	36	(2)
2014–2015	→ Almería (loan)	31	(0)
2015–2016	→ Bolton Wanderers (loan)	22	(2)
2016–2021	Fluminense	79	(14)
2018–2020	→ Internacional (loan)	45	(2)
2021–2022	Gamba Osaka	33	(1)
2023–2024	Cuiabá	29	(1)
2024	Al-Najma	16	(3)
2024–2025	Qingdao Hainiu	29	(11)
2024	→ Sport Recife (loan)	21	(2)
2026–	Chengdu Rongcheng	30	(10)

International career^{‡}
2008–2009	Brazil U17	11	(0)
2014–2015	Brazil U21	2	(0)
- * Club domestic league appearances and goals as of 8 November 2026, 09:00 (UTC) ‡ National team caps and goals as of 17 December 2014, 00:00 (UTC)

Wellington Alves da Silva (born 6 January 1993) is a Brazilian professional footballer who plays as a winger for Chinese Super League club Chengdu Rongcheng.

== Club career ==
=== Early career at Fluminense ===
Silva joined Fluminense's youth setup in 2004, from neighbours Portuguesa. In December 2008 he was invited to a trial period at Arsenal, and scored four goals in a single match against Norwich with the Academy side. He returned to Brazil, however, and was assigned back to the youth setup at Flu.

On 31 December 2009, Silva agreed a deal with Arsenal, for a £3.5 million fee. The deal was delayed until 2011 due to his age.

On 28 February 2010, Silva made his senior debut for Fluminense, starting and scoring the second of a 5–1 home routing over Friburguense for the Campeonato Carioca championship; his Série A debut came on 9 May, coming on as a late substitute in a 1–0 loss at Ceará. In October, Silva was widely criticised by coach Muricy Ramalho, after his complaints due to the lack of opportunities, and subsequently appeared rarely after the disruption with his manager.

=== Arsenal ===
On 31 January 2010, Silva signed for Arsenal, and featured in a reserves match against Manchester United on 19 August 2010. He played the whole 90 minutes and scored, cutting in from the right to hit the back of the net. He played in a closed-doors friendly for Arsenal in January 2010 against Dagenham and Redbridge, scoring a brace and setting up a third, being replaced after 70 minutes.

On 9 December 2010, it was announced that the FA had backtracked on its initial decision to award Silva his "Special Talent Visa". The next day, it was announced on Arsenal's official website that the club planned to send him out on loan due to the fact he couldn't get a work permit.

On 30 October 2014, it was reported that Silva had obtained the necessary work permit to play for Arsenal from the start of the following (2015–16) season.

==== Loans in Spain ====
On 12 January 2011, Arsenal loaned Silva to La Liga side Levante UD until June. He made his debut on the 29th coming on as a late substitute in a 2–0 home success against Getafe CF. Silva only appeared again on 21 May, again from the bench in a 2–1 home loss against Real Zaragoza.

On 10 July 2011, Silva rejoined the Granotes. However, after making no appearances for the Valencian side, he moved to CD Alcoyano in Segunda División on 12 January of the following year, also in a temporary deal.

On 20 August 2012, Silva joined SD Ponferradina on a season-long loan. He scored his first goal for the club in a 2–0 win at Villarreal CF, for the campaign's Copa del Rey.

Silva scored his first league goal for Ponfe on 11 November, but in a 5–3 home loss against Córdoba CF. He finished the season with 20 appearances (all from the bench, 425 minutes of action) as the Castile and León side narrowly missed out the play-offs.

In August 2013, Silva joined Real Murcia, again on loan. He appeared in 38 matches during the campaign, as his side was eventually knocked out in the play-offs.

On 16 July 2014, Silva moved to UD Almería also in a season-long loan deal. On 15 April of the following year was issued with a Spanish passport, allowing him to qualify automatically to work in the United Kingdom, and thus play for Arsenal.

==== Loan to Bolton Wanderers ====
On 18 August 2015, Silva joined Championship side Bolton Wanderers on a season long loan. At the time of the signing, Arsene Wenger said "He’s absolutely stunning to watch and I believe Bolton will be surprised by his quality." Silva made his debut for the club on 21 August in their 1–1 home draw against Nottingham Forest, lasting eighty four minutes before he was substituted for Emile Heskey. He scored his first goal for Bolton in a 4–3 defeat at Queens Park Rangers on 3 October 2015. Silva suffered a hamstring tear during a 1–0 defeat to Birmingham City on 20 October, causing him to miss two months of the season.

=== Return to Fluminense ===
On 18 July 2016, Wellington Silva returned to his former team Fluminense on a four-year contract. His name changed to Wellington to not be confused with Wellington Silva.

==== Loan to Internacional ====
On 6 January 2018, Fluminense loaned Wellington Silva to Internacional. On 6 January 2019, a new 18-month loan deal was arranged. On 31 January 2020, his loan was cut short, and he returned to Fluminense, where he featured sparingly during the year.

=== Gamba Osaka ===
On 25 March 2021, Wellington Silva was announced at Japanese club Gamba Osaka.

=== Cuiabá ===
On 17 February 2023, Wellington Silva returned to Brazil after being announced at Cuiabá.

=== Al-Najma ===
On 16 January 2024, Wellington Silva joined Saudi First Division League club Al-Najma, signing a six-month deal.

=== Chengdu Rongcheng ===
On 7 January 2026, Wellington Silva joined Chengdu Rongcheng.

== International career ==
Silva was a part of the Brazil under-17 squad that performed at the 2009 FIFA U-17 World Cup. In November 2014 he appeared with the under-21s in a 2–2 draw against Australia and a 3–1 win against South Korea.

== Career statistics ==
As of match played 8 November 2026

Appearances and goals by club, season and competition
Club	Season	League			State League (Note: Including Campeonato Carioca, Campeonato Gaúcho and Campeonato Mato-Grossense.)		Cup (Note: Including Copa do Brasil, Copa del Rey, FA Cup and Emperor's Cup.)		League Cup (Note: Including Football League Cup and J. League Cup.)		Continental (Note: Including UEFA Champions League, Copa Libertadores, Copa Sudamericana and AFC Champions League.)		Other (Note: Including Segunda División play-offs, FA Community Shield and Primeira Liga.)		Total	
Club	Season	Division	Apps	Goals	Apps	Goals	Apps	Goals	Apps	Goals	Apps	Goals	Apps	Goals	Apps	Goals
Fluminense	2010	Série A	2	0	9	1	6	0	—		—		—		17	1
Arsenal	2010–11	Premier League	0	0	—		0	0	—		—		—		0	0
Levante (loan)	2010–11	La Liga	2	0	—		0	0	—		—		—		2	0
Levante (loan)	2011–12	La Liga	0	0	—		0	0	—		—		—		0	0
Levante (loan)	Total		2	0	—		0	0	—		—		—		2	0
Alcoyano (loan)	2011–12	Segunda División	16	3	—		—		—		—		—		16	3
Ponferradina (loan)	2012–13	Segunda División	20	3	—		3	1	—		—		—		23	4
Murcia (loan)	2013–14	Segunda División	36	2	—		1	0	—		—		2	1	39	3
Almería (loan)	2014–15	La Liga	31	0	—		4	0	—		—		—		35	0
Bolton (loan)	2015–16	Championship	22	2	—		3	0	—		—		—		25	2
Fluminense	2016	Série A	20	2	—		3	0	—		—		—		23	2
Fluminense	2017	Série A	18	2	12	4	6	2	—		6	0	1	0	43	8
Fluminense	2020	Série A	22	4	7	2	6	0	—		—		—		35	6
Fluminense	Total		60	8	19	6	15	2	—		6	0	1	0	101	16
Internacional (loan)	2018	Série A	10	1	6	0	1	0	—		—		—		17	1
Internacional (loan)	2019	Série A	21	1	7	1	4	0	—		5	0	—		37	2
Internacional (loan)	2020	Série A	—		1	0	—		—		0	0	—		1	0
Internacional (loan)	Total		31	1	14	1	5	0	—		5	0	—		55	3
Gamba Osaka	2021	J1 League	21	0	—		3	2	0	0	5	1	—		29	3
Gamba Osaka	2022	J1 League	12	1	—		2	1	3	0	—		—		17	2
Gamba Osaka	Total		33	1	—		5	3	3	0	5	1	—		46	5
Cuiabá	2023	Série A	29	1	5	1	0	0	—		—		5	1	39	3
Al-Najma	2023–24	Saudi First Division	16	3	—		—		—		—		—		16	3
Qingdao Hainiu	2025	Chinese Super League	29	11	—		1	0	—		—		—		30	11
Sport Recife (loan)	2024	Série B	21	2	—		—		—		—		—		21	2
Chengdu Rongcheng	2026	Chinese Super League	30	10	—		1	0	—		2	0	—		33	10
Career total			378	47	47	9	44	6	3	0	18	1	8	2	498	66

== Honours ==
=== Club ===
Fluminense

- Campeonato Brasileiro Série A: 2010

=== Individual ===
- Campeonato Carioca Team of the year: 2017
