= Ko Yanagisawa =

Japanese footballer

Ko Yanagisawa 柳澤 亘
Personal information
- Full name: Ko Yanagisawa
- Date of birth: 28 June 1996 (age 30)
- Place of birth: Chiba, Japan
- Height: 1.80 m (5 ft 11 in)
- Position: Right-back

Team information
- Current team: Tokushima Vortis
- Number: 22

Youth career
- 2003–2006: Kashiwa SSS
- 2007–2008: Kashiwa Reysol
- 2009–2011: Kashima Antlers Tsukuba
- 2012–2014: Yachiyo Shoin High School

College career
Years	Team	Apps	(Gls)
2015–2018	Juntendo University		

Senior career*
Years	Team	Apps	(Gls)
2019–2021	FC Gifu	59	(0)
2021	Mito Hollyhock	12	(0)
2021–2023	Gamba Osaka	31	(0)
2024–	Tokushima Vortis	52	(4)
- * Club domestic league appearances and goals as of 14 August 2026

Ko Yanagisawa (柳澤 亘, Yanagisawa Kō; born 28 June 1996) is a Japanese professional footballer who plays as a right-back for J2 League club Tokushima Vortis.

== Career statistics ==
=== Club ===
As of 25 April 2024

Appearances and goals by club, season and competition
Club	Season	League			National Cup		League Cup		Other		Total	
Club	Season	Division	Apps	Goals	Apps	Goals	Apps	Goals	Apps	Goals	Apps	Goals
Japan			League		Emperor's Cup		J. League Cup		Other		Total	
FC Gifu	2019	J2 League	26	0	0	0	–		–		26	0
FC Gifu	2020	J3 League	33	0	0	0	–		–		33	0
FC Gifu	Total		59	0	0	0	0	0	0	0	59	0
Mito HollyHock	2021	J2 League	12	0	0	0	–		–		12	0
Gamba Osaka	2021	J1 League	15	0	3	1	2	0	–		20	1
Gamba Osaka	2022	J1 League	13	0	2	0	5	1	–		20	1
Gamba Osaka	2023	J1 League	3	0	1	0	1	0	–		5	0
Gamba Osaka	Total		31	0	6	1	8	1	0	0	45	2
Tokushima Vortis	2024	J2 League	0	0	0	0	0	0	–		0	0
Career total			102	0	6	1	8	1	0	0	116	2
