= Patric (footballer, born 1987) =

Brazilian footballer

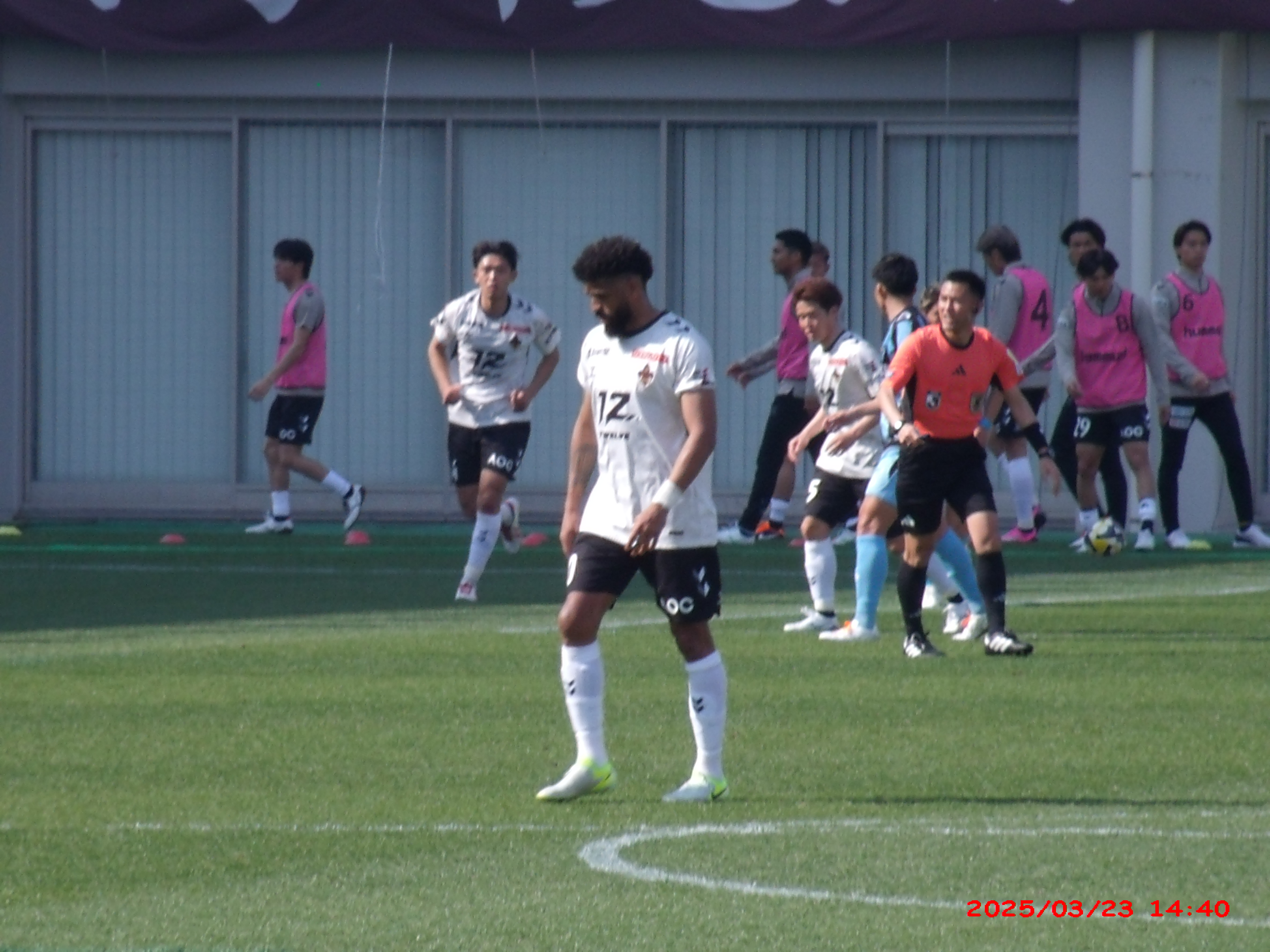
- Patric in 2025.

Personal information
- Full name: Anderson Patric Aguiar Oliveira
- Date of birth: 26 October 1987 (age 39)
- Place of birth: Macapá, Brazil
- Height: 1.89 m (6 ft 2 in)
- Position: Striker

Team information
- Current team: Zweigen Kanazawa
- Number: 10

Senior career*
Years	Team	Apps	(Gls)
2009	Democrata	2	(0)
2010	Americano	4	(2)
2010	Mixto	8	(7)
2010−2011	Vasco da Gama	0	(0)
2012	Vila Nova-GO	20	(14)
2012−2017	Atlético-GO	27	(4)
2013	→ Kawasaki Frontale (loan)	8	(2)
2013	→ Ventforet Kofu (loan)	16	(5)
2014	→ Fortaleza (loan)	3	(0)
2014−2017	→ Gamba Osaka (loan)	72	(23)
2016−2017	→ Gamba Osaka U-23 (loan)	13	(6)
2017−2019	Salgueiro	0	(0)
2017−2018	→ Sanfrecce Hiroshima (loan)	48	(24)
2019	Sanfrecce Hiroshima	13	(3)
2019–2020	→ Gamba Osaka (loan)	12	(2)
2020–2022	Gamba Osaka	94	(27)
2023	Kyoto Sanga	32	(10)
2024	Nagoya Grampus	32	(5)
2025–	Zweigen Kanazawa	51	(14)
- * Club domestic league appearances and goals as of 21 August 2026

Anderson Patric Aguiar Oliveira (born 26 October 1987), known as just Patric, is a Brazilian footballer who plays as a striker and currently play for J3 League club, Zweigen Kanazawa.

== Club career ==
=== Kawasaki Frontale ===
Patric made his debut for Kawasaki Frontale in the J. League Division 1 on 2 March 2013 against Kashiwa Reysol, when he came on as a 73rd-minute substitute for Yu Kobayashi, a game which Kawasaki lost 3–1. On 18 July 2013, Patric was sent on loan to Ventforet Kofu.

=== Sanfrecce Hiroshima ===
In 2017, Patric was loaned to Sanfrecce Hiroshima by the Brazilian club Salgueiro AC. After two seasons at Hiroshima, he was permanently transferred in 2019.

=== Gamba Osaka ===
In 2019, Patric returned to Gamba Osaka on loan from Sanfrecce Hiroshima since 2014. One year later, he announced a permanent transfer from 2020. He left the club in 2022 after three years at Osaka.

=== Kyoto Sanga ===
On 5 December 2022, Patric announcement joining J1 club Kyoto Sanga from 2023.

=== Nagoya Grampus ===
On 9 January 2024, Patric was announce permanent transfer to Nagoya Grampus. In the same year, he became the mainstay of the team, scoring two goals in the 25th match against his former club Kyoto Sanga on 7 August, achieving his 100th point in J1. Patric was announce leaving at Nagoya Grampus on 27 November due to the expiration of contract.

=== Zweigen Kanazawa ===
On 23 December 2024, Patric announcement officially permanent transfer to J3 club, Zweigen Kanazawa from 2025 season.

== Personal life ==
In November 2015, he obtained a Japanese driver's license and purchased a private car.

He is enthusiastic about learning the Japanese language, and often asks followers on his X account if he is right or wrong.

He wants to acquire Japanese citizenship and aims to play for the Japan national football team.

After the 2015 CS semi-final match against Urawa Reds, he posted a reply to a racist message on his Twitter account. "There are good and bad people in every country. This time, I received many messages of encouragement, not only from Gamba supporters, but also from supporters of other clubs. It gave me strength." After receiving an apology from the boy who made the post, he said, "I want him to become a better person.

== Career statistics ==
=== Club ===
As of the start from 2025 season.

Club	Season	League			State League		Cup		League Cup		Continental		Other		Total	
Club	Season	Division	Apps	Goals	Apps	Goals	Apps	Goals	Apps	Goals	Apps	Goals	Apps	Goals	Apps	Goals
Democrata	2009	Mineiro	–		2	0	–		–		–		–		2	0
Americano	2010	Carioca	–		4	2	–		–		–		–		4	2
Mixto	2010	Série D	8	7	–		–		–		–		–		8	7
Vasco da Gama	2011	Série A	0	0			–		–		2	0	–		2	0
Vila Nova	2012	Série C	–		20	14	–		–		–		–		20	14
Atlético Goianiense	2012	Série A	27	4	–		–		–		3	0	–		30	4
Kawasaki Frontale (loan)	2013	J.League Div 1	8	2	–		0	0	5	1	-		-		13	3
Ventforet Kofu (loan)	2013	J.League Div 1	16	5	–		2	1	0	0	-		-		18	6
Fortaleza (loan)	2014	Série C	3	0	–		–		–		–		–		3	0
Gamba Osaka (loan)	2014	J.League Div 1	19	9	–		3	3	5	3	-		-		27	15
Gamba Osaka (loan)	2015	J1 League	32	12	–		4	2	3	0	11	4	5	2	55	20
Gamba Osaka (loan)	2016	J1 League	20	2	–		0	0	2	0	5	1	1	0	28	3
Gamba Osaka (loan)	2017	J1 League	1	0	–		0	0	–		–		-		1	0
Gamba Osaka (loan)	Total		134	41	26	16	9	6	15	4	21	5	6	2	211	71
Sanfrecce Hiroshima (loan)	2017	J1 League	15	4	–		0	0	0	0	–		–		15	4
Sanfrecce Hiroshima (loan)	2018	J1 League	33	20	–		3	4	1	0	–		–		37	24
Sanfrecce Hiroshima	2019	J1 League	13	3	–		1	2	0	0	6	2	–		20	7
Sanfrecce Hiroshima	Total		61	27	–		4	6	1	0	6	2	–		72	35
Gamba Osaka (loan)	2020	J1 League	12	2	–		0	0	4	1	–		–		16	3
Gamba Osaka	2020	J1 League	33	9	–		2	1	1	1	–		–		36	11
Gamba Osaka	2021	J1 League	33	13	–		3	3	2	0	6	6	1	1	45	23
Gamba Osaka	2022	J1 League	28	5	–		3	3	3	2	–		–		34	10
Gamba Osaka	Total		106	29	–		8	7	10	4	6	6	1	1	131	47
Kyoto Sanga	2023	J1 League	32	10	–		1	1	2	0	–				35	11
Kyoto Sanga	Total		32	10	–		1	1	2	0	–				35	11
Nagoya Grampus	2024	J1 League	32	5	–		1	1	3	3	–				36	9
Nagoya Grampus	Total		32	5	–		1	1	3	3	–				36	9
Zweigen Kanazawa	2025	J3 League	0	0	–		0	0	0	0	–				0	0
Zweigen Kanazawa	Total		0	0	–		0	0	0	0	–				0	0
Career total			365	112	26	16	23	21	31	11	33	13	7	3	485	176

^{1} includes J. League Championship appearances and ^{2} includes Japanese Super Cup and Suruga Bank Championship appearances.

Reserves performance

Club performance			League		Total	
Season	Club	League	Apps	Goals	Apps	Goals
Japan			League		Total	
2016	Gamba Osaka U-23	J3 League	2	1	2	1
2017	Gamba Osaka U-23	J3 League	1	0	1	0
Career total			3	1	3	1

== Honours ==
=== Club ===
Gamba Osaka

- J. League Division 1: 2014
- Emperor's Cup: 2014, 2015
- J. League Cup: 2014
- Japanese Super Cup: 2015

Nagoya Grampus

- J.League Cup: 2024

=== Individual ===
- J. League Cup MVP: 2014
