= Jiro Nakamura =

Japanese footballer

Jiro Nakamura 中村 仁郎
Personal information
- Date of birth: 22 August 2003 (age 23)
- Place of birth: Osaka, Japan
- Height: 1.66 m (5 ft 5 in)
- Position: Winger

Team information
- Current team: Tochigi SC
- Number: 77

Youth career
- –2020: Gamba Osaka

Senior career*
Years	Team	Apps	(Gls)
2019–2020	Gamba Osaka U-23	33	(5)
2020–2026	Gamba Osaka	14	(0)
2024	→ Matsumoto Yamaga (loan)	12	(1)
2025	→ FC Gifu (loan)	22	(0)
2026–	Tochigi SC	7	(0)

International career^{‡}
2018–2019	Japan U15	3	(0)
2019–2020	Japan U16	3	(2)
2021–	Japan U22	2	(1)
- * Club domestic league appearances and goals as of 13:47, 12 October 2026 (UTC) ‡ National team caps and goals as of 17:04, 1 February 2022 (UTC)

Jiro Nakamura (中村 仁郎, Nakamura Jiro; born 22 August 2003) is a Japanese professional footballer who plays as a winger for J3 League club Tochigi SC.

== Career statistics ==
=== Club ===
As of 12 October 2026.

Appearances and goals by club, season and competition
Club	Season	League			National cup (Note: Includes Emperor's Cup)		League cup (Note: Includes J.League Cup)		Total	
Club	Season	Division	Apps	Goals	Apps	Goals	Apps	Goals	Apps	Goals
Gamba Osaka U-23	2019	J3 League	18	3	–		–		18	3
Gamba Osaka U-23	2020	J3 League	15	2	–		–		15	2
Gamba Osaka U-23	Total		33	5	0	0	0	0	33	5
Gamba Osaka	2020	J1 League	1	0	0	0	0	0	1	0
Gamba Osaka	2021	J1 League	1	0	0	0	0	0	1	0
Gamba Osaka	2022	J1 League	9	0	1	0	4	0	14	0
Gamba Osaka	2023	J1 League	0	0	0	0	1	0	1	0
Gamba Osaka	2026	J1 (100)	3	0	–		–		3	0
Gamba Osaka	Total		14	0	1	0	5	0	20	0
Matsumoto Yamaga (loan)	2024	J3 League	12	1	–		–		12	1
FC Gifu (loan)	2025	J3 League	22	0	2	0	1	0	25	0
Tochigi SC	2026–27	J3 League	7	0	2	1	1	0	10	1
Career total			88	6	5	1	7	0	100	7
