= Yota Sato (footballer) =

Japanese footballer

Yota Sato 佐藤 瑶大
Personal information
- Full name: Yota Sato
- Date of birth: 10 September 1998 (age 28)
- Place of birth: Kunitachi, Tokyo, Japan
- Height: 1.83 m (6 ft 0 in)
- Position: Centre back

Team information
- Current team: Nagoya Grampus
- Number: 3

Youth career
- Hagoromo SC
- Tachikawa Elf FC
- 2011–2013: FC Tama
- 2014–2016: Komazawa University High School

College career
Years	Team	Apps	(Gls)
2017–2020	Meiji University		

Senior career*
Years	Team	Apps	(Gls)
2020–2023	Gamba Osaka	22	(0)
2022	→ Vegalta Sendai (loan)	15	(0)
2024	Urawa Red Diamonds	19	(0)
2025–	Nagoya Grampus	34	(5)
- * Club domestic league appearances and goals as of 12 August 2026

Yota Sato (佐藤 瑶大, Sato Yota; born 10 September 1998) is a Japanese footballer who plays as a centre back for J1 League club Nagoya Grampus.

== Career statistics ==
=== Club ===
As of 28 December 2024.

Appearances and goals by club, season and competition
Club	Season	League			National Cup (Note: Appearances in the Emperor's Cup)		League Cup (Note: Appearances at the J.League Cup)		Continental (Note: Appearances at the AFC Champions League)		Total	
Club	Season	Division	Apps	Goals	Apps	Goals	Apps	Goals	Apps	Goals	Apps	Goals
Meiji University	2019	–			1	0	–		0	0	1	0
Gamba Osaka	2020	J1 League	0	0	0	0	0	0	0	0	0	0
Gamba Osaka	2021	J1 League	8	0	4	0	0	0	2	0	14	0
Gamba Osaka	2022	J1 League	2	0	2	0	4	1	0	0	8	1
Gamba Osaka	2023	J1 League	12	0	1	0	3	0	0	0	16	0
Gamba Osaka	Total		22	0	7	0	7	1	2	0	38	1
Vegalta Sendai (loan)	2022	J2 League	15	0	0	0	0	0	0	0	15	0
Urawa Red Diamonds	2024	J1 League	19	0	2	0	0	0	0	0	7	0
Nagoya Grampus	2025	J1 League	0	0	0	0	0	0	0	0	7	0
Career total			56	0	10	0	7	1	2	0	61	1
