= Kōhei Okuno =

Japanese footballer

Kōhei Okuno 奥野 耕平
Personal information
- Full name: Kōhei Okuno
- Date of birth: April 3, 2000 (age 26)
- Place of birth: Hyogo, Japan
- Height: 1.74 m (5 ft 9 in)
- Position: Defensive midfielder

Team information
- Current team: Avispa Fukuoka
- Number: 8

Youth career
- Arioka FC
- 2013–2018: Gamba Osaka

Senior career*
Years	Team	Apps	(Gls)
2017–2020	Gamba Osaka U-23	51	(4)
2019–2023	Gamba Osaka	57	(0)
2023	→ Shonan Bellmare (loan)	27	(0)
2024−2025	Shonan Bellmare	57	(2)
2026–	Avispa Fukuoka	15	(0)
- * Club domestic league appearances and goals as of 12 August 2026

Kōhei Okuno (奥野 耕平, Okuno Kōhei; born April 3, 2000) is a Japanese footballer who plays as a defensive midfielder for J1 League club Avispa Fukuoka.

== Career ==
Okuno joined J1 League club Gamba Osaka in 2019 and was handed the number 26 jersey. Prior to that he spent 2 seasons on loan with Gamba Osaka Under-23 while he completed his high school education. He played 4 games in 2017 and 2 more substitute appearances in 2018.

In March 2023, it was announced that Okuno would be joining Shonan Bellmare on a season-long loan.

== Career statistics ==
As of 29 April 2026

Appearances and goals by club, season and competition
Club	Season	League			National cup (Note: Includes Emperors Cup)		League cup (Note: Includes J.League Cup)		Continental		Total	
Club	Season	Division	Apps	Goals	Apps	Goals	Apps	Goals	Apps	Goals	Apps	Goals
Gamba Osaka U-23	2017	J3 League	4	0	–		–		–		4	0
Gamba Osaka U-23	2018	J3 League	2	0	–		–		–		2	0
Gamba Osaka U-23	2019	J3 League	23	1	–		–		–		23	1
Gamba Osaka U-23	2020	J3 League	22	3	–		–		–		22	3
Gamba Osaka U-23	Total		51	4	0	0	0	0	0	0	51	4
Gamba Osaka	2020	J1 League	7	0	1	0	1	0	0	0	9	0
Gamba Osaka	2021	J1 League	26	0	4	0	1	0	5 (Note: Appearances in AFC Champions League Elite)	0	36	0
Gamba Osaka	2022	J1 League	24	0	2	1	5	1	0	0	31	2
Gamba Osaka	Total		57	0	7	1	7	1	5	0	76	2
Shonan Bellmare (loan)	2023	J1 League	27	0	3	0	5	0	–		35	0
Shonan Bellmare	2024	J1 League	26	0	3	1	1	0	–		30	1
Shonan Bellmare	2025	J1 League	31	2	1	0	5	0	–		37	2
Shonan Bellmare	Total		57	2	4	1	6	0	0	0	67	3
Avispa Fukuoka	2026	J1 (100)	10	0	–		–		–		10	0
Career total			202	6	14	2	18	1	5	0	239	9
