= Hiroto Yamami =

Japanese footballer

Hiroto Yamami 山見 大登
Personal information
- Date of birth: 16 August 1999 (age 27)
- Place of birth: Osaka, Japan
- Height: 1.65 m (5 ft 5 in)
- Position: Forward

Team information
- Current team: Tokyo Verdy
- Number: 11

Youth career
- Senri Hijiri SC
- –2011: Senrioka FC
- 2012–2014: Toyonaka Daihachi Jr. High School
- 2015–2017: Osaka Gakuin University High School

College career
Years	Team	Apps	(Gls)
2018–2021	Kwansei Gakuin University		

Senior career*
Years	Team	Apps	(Gls)
2021–2024	Gamba Osaka	40	(4)
2024	Tokyo Verdy (loan)	34	(7)
2025–	Tokyo Verdy	27	(2)
- * Club domestic league appearances and goals as of 8 August 2026

Hiroto Yamami (山見 大登, Yamami Hiroto; born 16 August 1999) is a Japanese footballer currently playing as a forward for J1 League club Tokyo Verdy.

== Career statistics ==
=== Club ===
As of 25 April 2024

Appearances and goals by club, season and competition
Club	Season	League			National Cup		League Cup		Other		Total	
Club	Season	Division	Apps	Goals	Apps	Goals	Apps	Goals	Apps	Goals	Apps	Goals
Japan			League		Emperor's Cup		J. League Cup		Other		Total	
Kwansei Gakuin University	2021	–			2	1	–		–		2	1
Gamba Osaka	2021	J1 League	5	1	0	0	2	1	–		7	2
Gamba Osaka	2022	J1 League	21	2	3	1	5	0	–		29	3
Gamba Osaka	2023	J1 League	14	1	1	0	4	0	–		19	1
Gamba Osaka	Total		40	4	4	1	11	1	0	0	55	6
Tokyo Verdy (loan)	2024	J1 League	8	1	0	0	0	0	0	0	8	1
Career total			48	5	6	2	11	1	0	0	65	8
