= Kei Ishikawa =

Japanese footballer

Kei Ishikawa 石川 慧
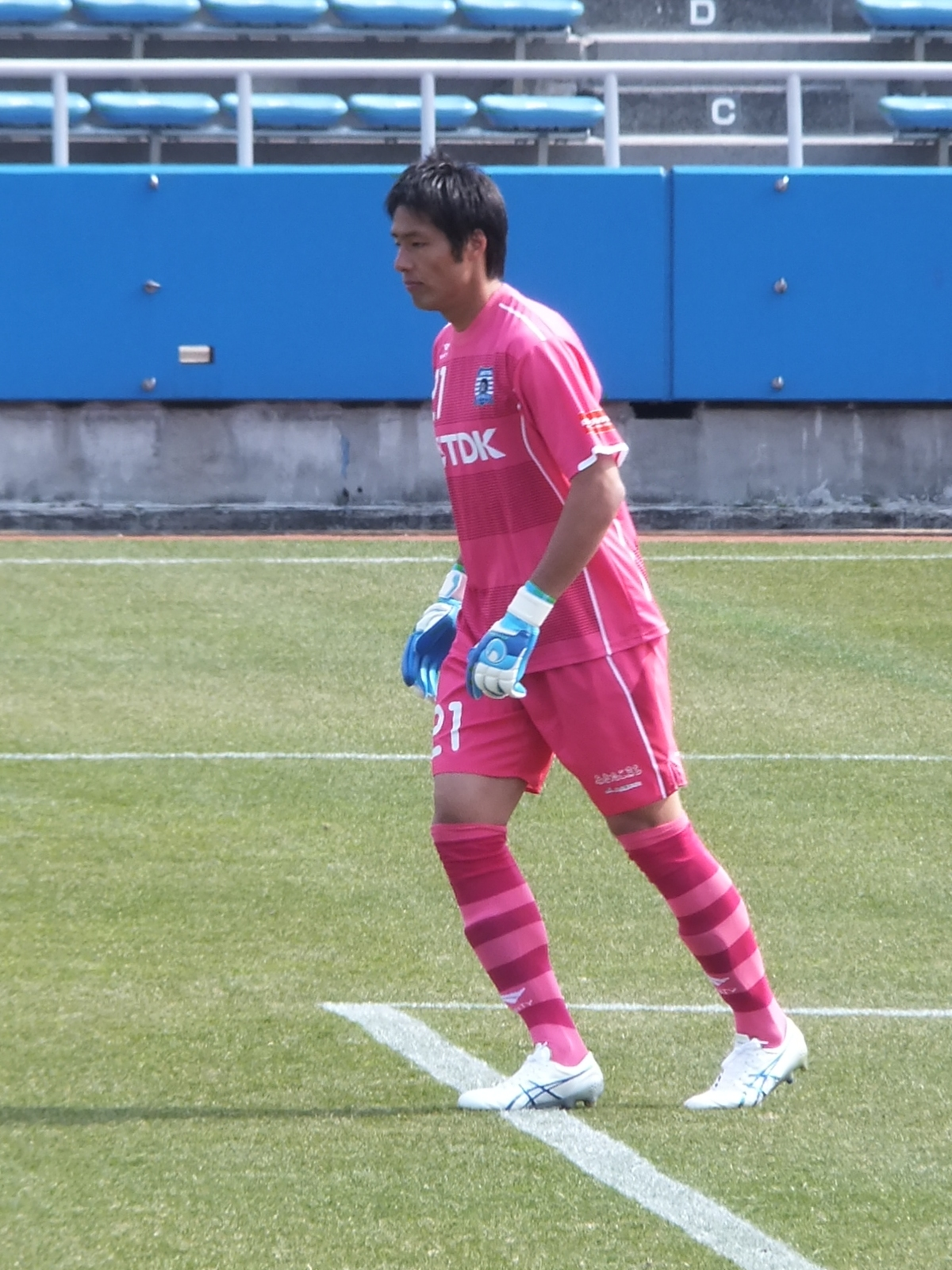

Personal information
- Full name: Kei Ishikawa
- Date of birth: September 30, 1992 (age 34)
- Place of birth: Niigata, Japan
- Height: 1.85 m (6 ft 1 in)
- Position: Goalkeeper

Team information
- Current team: Shimizu S-Pulse
- Number: 22

Youth career
- 2008–2010: Niigata Meikun High School

Senior career*
Years	Team	Apps	(Gls)
2011–2017	Vegalta Sendai	2	(0)
2013	→ Sony Sendai (loan)	1	(0)
2014	→ Blaublitz Akita (loan)	21	(0)
2018–2019	Tochigi SC	2	(0)
2019	Sagan Tosu	0	(0)
2020–2024	Gamba Osaka	6	(0)
2020	→ Gamba Osaka U-23 (loan)	5	(0)
2025	Ventforet Kofu	2	(0)
2026–	Shimizu S-Pulse	0	(0)
Medal record
Vegalta Sendai
Runner-up	J1 League	2012
- * Club domestic league appearances and goals as of 16:02, 24 April 2026 (UTC)

Kei Ishikawa (石川 慧, Ishikawa Kei; born September 30, 1993 in Niigata) is a Japanese footballer who plays as a goalkeeper for J1 League club Shimizu S-Pulse.

== Playing career ==
Kei Ishikawa joined to J1 League club; Vegalta Sendai in 2011. In March 2013, he moved to Sony Sendai, in 2014 he moved to Blaublitz Akita. In 2015, he back to Vegalta Sendai.

== Club statistics ==
As of 24 April 2026.

Appearances and goals by club, season and competition
Club	Season	League			National cup (Note: Includes Emperors Cup)		League cup (Note: Includes J.League Cup)		Continental		Total	
Club	Season	Division	Apps	Goals	Apps	Goals	Apps	Goals	Apps	Goals	Apps	Goals
Vegalta Sendai	2011	J.League Division 1	0	0	0	0	0	0	–		0	0
Vegalta Sendai	2012	J.League Division 1	0	0	0	0	0	0	–		0	0
Vegalta Sendai	2013	J.League Division 1	0	0	0	0	0	0	–		0	0
Vegalta Sendai	2015	J1 League	0	0	0	0	0	0	–		0	0
Vegalta Sendai	2016	J1 League	2	0	0	0	1	0	–		3	0
Vegalta Sendai	2017	J1 League	0	0	0	0	0	0	–		0	0
Vegalta Sendai	Total		2	0	0	0	1	0	0	0	3	0
Sony Sendai FC (loan)	2013	JFL	1	0	–		–		–		1	0
Blaublitz Akita (loan)	2014	J3 League	21	0	2	0	–		–		23	0
Tochigi SC	2018	J2 League	2	0	1	0	–		–		3	0
Tochigi SC	2019	J2 League	0	0	0	0	–		–		0	0
Tochigi SC	Total		2	0	1	0	0	0	0	0	3	0
Sagan Tosu	2019	J1 League	0	0	1	0	–		–		1	0
Gamba Osaka	2020	J1 League	0	0	0	0	2	0	0	0	2	0
Gamba Osaka	2021	J1 League	0	0	3	0	0	0	2 (Note: Appearances in AFC Champions League Elite)	0	5	0
Gamba Osaka	2022	J1 League	5	0	0	0	2	0	0	0	7	0
Gamba Osaka	2023	J1 League	1	0	0	0	0	0	0	0	1	0
Gamba Osaka	2024	J1 League	0	0	0	0	0	0	0	0	0	0
Gamba Osaka	Total		6	0	3	0	4	0	2	0	15	0
Gamba Osaka U-23 (loan)	2020	J3 League	5	0	–		–		–		5	0
Ventforet Kofu	2025	J2 League	2	0	0	0	–		–		2	0
Career total			39	0	7	0	5	0	2	0	53	0
