= Taichi Kato =

Japanese footballer

Personal information
- Date of birth: 14 April 1997 (age 29)
- Place of birth: Ehime, Japan
- Height: 1.80 m (5 ft 11 in)
- Position: Goalkeeper

Youth career
- –2015: Nagoya Grampus
- 2016–2019: Meiji University

Senior career*
Years	Team	Apps	(Gls)
2020–2021	Ehime FC	4	(0)
2021	→ Gamba Osaka (loan)	0	(0)
2022	Gamba Osaka	1	(0)
- * Club domestic league appearances and goals as of 21:56, 22 July 2023 (UTC)

Taichi Kato (加藤 大智, Kato Taichi; born 14 April 1997) is a Japanese former professional footballer who played as a goalkeeper. He played for Ehime FC and Gamba Osaka before retiring at the end of the 2022 season aged 25.

== Career ==
Kato began his career at Nagoya Grampus, appearing for both their U-15 and U-18 academies. He then went on to study at Meiji University between 2016 and 2019 – helping them win the 2019 Japan College Prime Ministers Cup in a 2–1 victory over Hosei University. In November 2019, it was announced that Kato would be joining J2 League team Ehime FC for the 2020 season. He made his professional debut in September 2020 in a league victory over Tokyo Verdy, keeping a clean sheet in their 1–0 win. He went on to play a further three times in the 2020 season.

In April 2021, he moved on loan to J1 League club Gamba Osaka, before completing a permanent transfer to the club in December 2021. He made five appearances for the club throughout the 2022 season.

Kato was released by Gamba Osaka at the end of the 2022 season. He took part in the J.League tryouts to help out of contract players find a new club, however the tryout was unsuccessful. After making only four league appearances in his career, decided to retire from professional football in February 2023. In March 2023, Kato was appointed as a coach at Nagoya Grampus' soccer school – the club where he began his career.

== Career statistics ==
Appearances and goals by club, season and competition
Club	Season	League			National cup		League cup		Total	
Club	Season	Division	Apps	Goals	Apps	Goals	Apps	Goals	Apps	Goals
Japan			League		Emperor's Cup		J. League Cup		Total	
Meiji University	2019	–			2	0	–		2	0
Ehime FC	2020	J2 League	4	0	0	0	–		4	0
Gamba Osaka (loan)	2021	J1 League	0	0	0	0	0	0	0	0
Gamba Osaka	2022	J1 League	1	0	2	0	2	0	5	0
Gamba Osaka	Total		1	0	2	0	2	0	5	0
Career total			5	0	4	0	2	0	11	0
