= 2026 Gamba Osaka season =

Gamba Osaka
2026 season
- Chairman: Takashi Yamauchi
- Head coach: (Germany) Jens Wissing
- Stadium: Panasonic Stadium Suita
- AFC Champions League 2: Winners
- Average home league attendance: 28,532
Home colours	Away colours

The 2026 Gamba Osaka season was the club's 46th season in existence.

== Squad ==
Squad no.	Name	Nationality	Date of birth	Last Team
Goalkeepers
1	Masaaki Higashiguchi	(Japan)	12 May 1986 (age 40)	(Japan) Albirex Niigata
18	Rui Araki	(Japan)	14 October 2007 (age 19)	Youth Team
22	Jun Ichimori	(Japan)	2 July 1991 (age 35)	(Japan) Yokohama F. Marinos
31	Zhang Aolin ^{Type 2}	(Japan) (China)	25 May 2005 (age 21)	Youth Team
Defenders
2	Shota Fukuoka	(Japan)	24 October 1995 (age 31)	(Japan) Tokushima Vortis
3	Riku Handa	(Japan)	1 January 2002 (age 24)	(Japan) Montedio Yamagata
4	Shinnosuke Nakatani	(Japan)	24 March 1996 (age 30)	(Japan) Nagoya Grampus
5	Genta Miura	(Japan)	1 March 1995 (age 31)	(Japan) Shimizu S-Pulse
15	Takeru Kishimoto	(Japan)	16 July 1997 (age 29)	(Japan) Shimizu S-Pulse
19	Ikegaya Ginjiro	(Japan)	19 June 2004 (age 22)	(Japan) University of Tsukuba
21	Ryo Hatsuse	(Japan)	10 July 1997 (age 29)	(England) Sheffield Wednesday
34	Yuya Yokoi	(Japan)	15 April 2008 (age 18)	Youth Team
67	Shogo Sasaki	(Japan)	25 July 2000 (age 26)	(Japan) JEF United Chiba
	Haruki Ozawa	(Japan)	18 April 2004 (age 22)	(Japan) Meiji University
Midfielders
7	Takashi Usami (c)	(Japan)	6 May 1992 (age 34)	(Germany) Fortuna Düsseldorf
8	Ryotaro Meshino	(Japan)	8 June 1998 (age 28)	(Portugal) Estoril
10	Shu Kurata	(Japan)	26 November 1988 (age 37)	(Japan) Cerezo Osaka
13	Shuto Abe	(Japan)	5 December 1997 (age 28)	(Belgium) R.W.D. Molenbeek
16	Tokuma Suzuki	(Japan)	12 March 1997 (age 29)	(Japan) Cerezo Osaka
27	Rin Mito	(Japan)	12 February 2002 (age 24)	(Japan) Kwansei Gakuin University
32	Yuki Yoshihara	(Japan)	19 July 2004 (age 22)	(Japan) Takushoku University
35	Taiki Tono	(Japan)	2 June 2007 (age 19)	Youth Team
36	Takato Yamamoto	(Japan)	24 August 2007 (age 19)	Youth Team
38	Gaku Nawata	(Japan)	26 July 2006 (age 20)	(Japan) Kamimura Gakuen High School
41	Jiro Nakamura	(Japan)	2 August 2003 (age 23)	(Japan) FC Gifu
47	Shinya Nakano	(Japan)	17 August 2003 (age 23)	(Japan) Shonan Bellmare
48	Yoshiki Fujimoto	(Japan)	2 April 2009 (age 17)	Youth team
Forwards
9	Daichi Hayashi	(Japan)	23 May 1997 (age 29)	(Germany) 1. FC Nürnberg
11	Issam Jebali	(Tunisia)	25 December 1991 (age 34)	(Denmark) Odense Boldklub
17	Ryoya Yamashita	(Japan)	19 October 1997 (age 29)	(Japan) Yokohama FC
23	Deniz Hümmet	(Turkey) (Sweden)	13 September 1996 (age 30)	(Sweden) Djurgårdens
37	Naru Nakatsumi	(Japan)	19 December 2007 (age 18)	Youth Team
40	Shoji Toyama	(Japan)	21 September 2002 (age 24)	(Japan) Tokyo Verdy
42	Harumi Minamino	(Japan)	13 May 2004 (age 22)	(Japan) Tochigi SC
44	Kanji Okunuki	(Japan)	11 August 1999 (age 27)	(Germany) 1. FC Nürnberg
55	Asahi Uenaka	(Japan)	1 November 2001 (age 24)	(Japan) Yokohama F. Marinos
97	Welton Felipe	(Brazil)	23 May 1997 (age 29)	(Bulgaria) Levski Sofia
Players loan out
6	Makoto Mitsuta	(Japan)	20 July 1999 (age 27)	(Japan) Sanfrecce Hiroshima
Players left during mid-season
30	Philipp Max	(Germany)	30 September 1993 (age 33)	(Greece) Panathinaikos

Last updated: 10 March 2023.
Source: Gamba Osaka website

== Transfers ==
=== In ===
Pre-season

Date	Position	Player	Transferred from	Ref
Permanent Transfer
20 December 2025	FW	(Japan) Asahi Uenaka	(Japan) Yokohama F. Marinos	Free
22 December 2025	MF	(Japan) Ibuki Konno	(Japan) Ehime FC	End of loan
26 December 2025	FW	(Japan) Makoto Mitsuta	(Japan) Sanfrecce Hiroshima	Undisclosed
30 December 2025	FW	(Japan) Ikeya Ginshirou	(Japan) University of Tsukuba	Free
31 December 2025	DF	(Japan) Ryuta Takahashi	(Japan) Giravanz Kitakyushu	End of loan
4 January 2026	MF	(Japan) Jiro Nakamura	(Japan) FC Gifu	End of loan
4 January 2026	MF	(Japan) Shinya Nakano	(Japan) Shonan Bellmare	End of loan
5 January 2026	FW	(Japan) Shoji Toyama	(Japan) Tokyo Verdy	End of loan
12 March 2026	DF	(Germany) Philipp Max	(Greece) Panathinaikos	Free
Loan Transfer

Post-season

Date	Position	Player	Transferred To	Ref
Permanent Transfer
31 May 2026	FW	(Japan) Makoto Mitsuta	(Japan) Vissel Kobe	End of loan
17 June 2026	DF	(Japan) Haruki Ozawa	(Japan) Meiji University	Free
Loan Transfer

=== Out ===
Pre-season

Date	Position	Player	Transferred To	Ref
Permanent Transfer
5 December 2025	MF	(Brazil) Juan Alano	(Brazil) Ceará	Free
23 December 2025	MF	(Japan) Ibuki Konno	(Japan) Iwaki FC	Free
25 December 2025	FW	(Japan) Makoto Mitsuta	(Japan) Sanfrecce Hiroshima	End of loan
31 December 2025	DF	(Japan) Keisuke Kurokawa	(United States) DC United	Free
Loan Transfer

Mid-season

Date	Position	Player	Transferred To	Ref
Permanent Transfer
30 April 2026	DF	(Germany) Philipp Max	Mutual contract termination	
Loan Transfer
28 March 2026	FW	(Japan) Makoto Mitsuta	(Japan) Vissel Kobe	Season loan

Post-season

Date	Position	Player	Transferred To	Ref
Permanent Transfer
Loan Transfer
June 2026	FW	(Japan) Shoji Toyama	(Japan) Hokkaido Consadole Sapporo	Season loan

== Pre-season & Friendly ==
=== Tour of Okinawa (11 Jan - 24 Jan) ===
Win Draw Loss

15 January 1	Machida Zelvia	2–3	Gamba Osaka	Okinawa
	Yuki Soma 6'; Gen Shoji 64'		Ryoya Yamashita 11'; Jiro Nakamura 45'; Harumi Minamino 87'	Stadium: Yoshinoura Park Gosamaru Athletics Stadium

21 January 2	Shonan Bellmare	1–1	Gamba Osaka	Okinawa
	7'	Report	Harumi Minamino 78'	Stadium: Yoshinoura Park Gosamaru Athletics Stadium

25 January 3	Hokkaido Consadole Sapporo	1–4	Gamba Osaka	Okinawa
	16'	Report	Dennis Hummet 23'; Takashi Usami 49'; Shoji Toyama 107'; Yasuo Tono 134'	Stadium: Yoshinoura Park Gosamaru Athletics Stadium

== Competitions ==
=== J1 League ===
Pos	Team	Pld	W	PKW	PKL	L	GF	GA	GD	Pts	Qualification
1	Vissel Kobe	18	9	2	4	3	27	21	+6	35	Final
2	Cerezo Osaka	18	7	4	2	5	26	19	+7	31	3rd–4th place playoff
3	Nagoya Grampus	18	8	2	3	5	31	28	+3	31	5th–6th place playoff
4	Sanfrecce Hiroshima	18	8	2	2	6	29	21	+8	30	7th–8th place playoff
5	Gamba Osaka	18	5	5	3	5	26	22	+4	28	9th–10th place playoff
6	Fagiano Okayama	18	6	2	4	6	24	25	−1	26	11th–12th place playoff
7	Shimizu S-Pulse	18	4	4	4	6	19	21	−2	24	13th–14th place playoff
8	Kyoto Sanga	18	5	3	2	8	19	26	−7	23	15th–16th place playoff
9	V-Varen Nagasaki	18	6	1	1	10	20	28	−8	21	17th–18th place playoff
10	Avispa Fukuoka	18	3	4	4	7	17	27	−10	21	19th–20th place playoff

Source: JLeague.co, J.League Data Site
Rules for classification: 1) Points; 2) Goal difference; 3) Goals scored; 4) Head-to-head.

==== Matches ====
7 February 1	Cerezo Osaka	0–0 (4–5 p)	Gamba Osaka	Osaka
	Thiago Andrade (yellow card) 1'; Hayato Tanaka (red card) 41'	Report	Tokuma Suzuki (yellow card) 3'; Takeru Kishimoto (yellow card) 8' (yellow-red card) 84'	Stadium: Yodoko Sakura Stadium; Attendance: 42,101; Referee: Koei Koya
	Penalties
	Motohiko Nakajima (penalty scored); Dion Cool (penalty scored); Shunta Tanaka (penalty scored); Kusini Yengi (penalty scored); Reiya Sakata (penalty missed)		Issam Jebali (penalty scored); Deniz Hümmet (penalty scored); Gaku Nawata (penalty scored); Shinnosuke Nakatani (penalty scored); Shuto Abe (penalty scored)

15 February 2	Gamba Osaka	0–0 (2–3 p)	Nagoya Grampus	Osaka
	Ryoya Yamashita (yellow card) 30'	Report	Sho Inagaki (yellow card) 32'	Stadium: Suita City Football Stadium; Attendance: 34,964; Referee: Keigo Sendachi
	Penalties
	Shu Kurata (penalty scored); Gaku Nawata (penalty missed); Tokuma Suzuki (penalty scored); Shinnosuke Nakatani (penalty missed); Shoji Toyama (penalty missed)		Sho Inagaki (penalty scored); Marcus Vinicius (penalty scored); Tomoki Takamine (penalty scored); Haruya Fujii (penalty missed); Shuhei Tokumoto (penalty missed)

22 February 3	Fagiano Okayama	1–2	Gamba Osaka	Okayama
	Lucao 14' (pen.); Towa Yamane (yellow card) 58'	Report	Deniz Hümmet 32'; Harumi Minamino 76'; Shinnosuke Nakatani (yellow card) 12'; Yutaka Matsuzaki (yellow card) 38'	Stadium: JFE Harenokuni Stadium; Attendance: 14,412; Referee: Daichi Shiino

28 February 4	Gamba Osaka	2–2 (5–4 p)	Shimizu S-Pulse	Osaka
	Ryotaro Meshino 27'; Deniz Hümmet 41'	Report	Koya Kitagawa 83'; Capixaba 86'	Stadium: Suita City Football Stadium; Attendance: 26,522; Referee: Atsushi Kamimura
	Penalties
	Harumi Minamino (penalty scored); Shu Kurata (penalty scored); Makoto Mitsuta (penalty scored); Kanji Okunuki (penalty scored); Tokuma Suzuki (penalty scored)		Koya Kitagawa (penalty scored); Matheus Bueno (penalty scored); Zento Uno (penalty scored); Kai Matsuzaki (penalty missed); Alfredo Stephens (penalty scored)

8 March 5	Gamba Osaka	3–2	V-Varen Nagasaki	Osaka
	Deniz Hümmet 13'; Shinnosuke Nakatani 52'; Riku Handa 83'	Report	Matheus Jesus 21', 27'	Stadium: Suita City Football Stadium; Attendance: 27,965; Referee: Akihiko Ikeuchi

14 March 6	Sanfrecce Hiroshima	2–0	Gamba Osaka	Hiroshima
	Naoto Arai 41'; Sōta Nakamura 68'; Taishi Matsumoto (yellow card) 32'; Taichi Yamasaki (yellow card) 90+2'	Report	Shuto Abe (yellow card) 49'; Takeru Kishimoto (yellow card) 66' (yellow-red card) 85'; Riku Handa (yellow card) 89'	Stadium: Edion Peace Wing Hiroshima; Attendance: 26,671; Referee: Hiroki Kasahara

18 March 7	Vissel Kobe	2–2 (3–5 p)	Gamba Osaka	Kobe
	Ren Komatsu 6'; Jean Patric 90+4'; Yosuke Ideguchi (yellow card) 46'; Michael Skibbe (yellow card) 64'	Report	Deniz Hümmet 23'; Ryoya Yamashita 83'; Ryo Hatsuse (yellow card) 80'	Stadium: Noevir Stadium Kobe; Attendance: 21,690; Referee: Koji Takasaki
	Penalties
	Matheus Thuler (penalty missed); Takahiro Ogihara (penalty scored); Jean Patric (penalty scored); Katsuya Nagato (penalty scored)		Harumi Minamino (penalty scored); Ryotaro Meshino (penalty scored); Shuto Abe (penalty scored); Kanji Okunuki (penalty missed); Genta Miura (penalty scored)

21 March 8	Avispa Fukuoka	2–2 (14–13 p)	Gamba Osaka	Fukuoka
	Yuma Tsujioka 22', 90+3'; Tomoya Miki (penalty missed) 82; Kokoro Maeda (yellow card) 74'; Hideki Tsukamoto (yellow card) 86'	Report	Deniz Hümmet 11'; Welton Felipe 42'; Ryotaro Meshino (yellow card) 90+1'	Stadium: Best Denki Stadium; Attendance: 7,631; Referee: Koki Nagamine
	Penalties
	Nassim Ben Khalifa (penalty scored); Yuji Kitajima (penalty scored); Yuma Tsujioka (penalty scored); Teppei Oka (penalty scored); Tomoya Miki (penalty missed); Yota Maejima (penalty scored); Masaya Tashiro (penalty scored); Yu Hashimoto (penalty scored); Kazuki Fujimoto (penalty scored); Yuma Obata (penalty scored); Abdul Hanan Sani Brown (penalty scored); Nassim Ben Khalifa (penalty scored); Yuji Kitajima (penalty scored); Yuma Tsujioka (penalty scored); Teppei Oka (penalty scored)		Deniz Hümmet (penalty scored); Shu Kurata (penalty scored); Riku Handa (penalty missed); Issam Jebali (penalty scored); Ryotaro Meshino (penalty scored); Tokuma Suzuki (penalty scored); Genta Miura (penalty scored); Takeru Kishimoto (penalty scored); Shinnosuke Nakatani (penalty scored); Rin Mito (penalty scored); Masaaki Higashiguchi (penalty scored); Deniz Hümmet (penalty scored); Shu Kurata (penalty scored); Riku Handa (penalty scored); Issam Jebali (penalty missed)

4 April 9	Gamba Osaka	2–0	Kyoto Sanga	Osaka
	Deniz Hümmet 13'; Ryotaro Meshino 75'; Welton Felipe (yellow card) 11'	Report	Hidehiro Sugai (yellow card) 19'; Temma Matsuda (yellow card) 38'; Alex Alccntara (yellow card) 85'	Stadium: Suita City Football Stadium; Attendance: 27,863; Referee: Masuya Ueda

11 April 10	Gamba Osaka	0–1	Cerezo Osaka	Osaka
	Shu Kurata (yellow card) 30'; Harumi Minamino (yellow card) 55'; Deniz Hümmet (penalty missed) 73	Report	Thiago Andrade 41' (yellow card) 14'; Hayato Okuda (yellow card) 7'	Stadium: Suita City Football Stadium; Attendance: 35,137; Referee: Hiroyuki Kimura

19 April 11	Gamba Osaka	2–2 (5–3 p)	Fagiano Okayama	Osaka
	Takeru Kishimoto 41'; Issam Jebali 66'; Genta Miura (yellow card) 75'	Report	Masaaki Higashiguchi 5' (o.g.); Ataru Esaka 73'; Noah Kenshin Browne (yellow card) 43'	Stadium: Suita City Football Stadium; Attendance: 27,661; Referee: Yuzo Sutani
	Penalties
	Takashi Usami (penalty scored); Shuto Abe (penalty scored); Ryotaro Meshino (penalty scored); Kanji Okunuki (penalty scored); Genta Miura (penalty scored)		Ataru Esaka (penalty scored); Daichi Tagami (penalty missed); Kota Kawano (penalty scored); Werik Popó (penalty scored)

25 April 12	V-Varen Nagasaki	1–1 (5–6 p)	Gamba Osaka	Nagasaki
	Matheus Jesus 78' (pen.); Dudu (yellow card) 85'	Report	Deniz Hümmet 80'	Stadium: Peace Stadium Connected by SoftBank; Attendance: 20,267; Referee: Ryo Tanimoto
	Penalties
	Matheus Jesus (penalty scored); Dudu (penalty scored); Masahiro Sekiguchi (penalty scored); Ryogo Yamasaki (penalty scored); Ikki Arai (penalty scored); Shunya Yoneda (penalty missed)		Harumi Minamino (penalty scored); Takato Yamamoto (penalty scored); Ryoya Yamashita (penalty scored); Takashi Usami (penalty scored); Deniz Hümmet (penalty scored); Shinya Nakano (penalty scored)

29 April 13	Kyoto Sanga	1–1 (5–4 p)	Gamba Osaka	Kyoto
	Haruki Arai 90'	Report	Harumi Minamino 90+4'; Takashi Usami (yellow card) 51'	Stadium: Sanga Stadium by Kyocera; Attendance: 19,891; Referee: Atsushi Kamimura
	Penalties
	Marco Tulio (penalty scored); João Pedro (penalty missed); Rafael Elias (penalty scored); Takuji Yonemoto (penalty scored); Shogo Asada (penalty scored); Taiki Hirato (penalty missed); Shinnosuke Fukuda (penalty scored)		Harumi Minamino (penalty scored); Ryotaro Meshino (penalty scored); Shinnosuke Nakatani (penalty missed); Deniz Hümmet (penalty scored); Genta Miura (penalty scored); Ryoya Yamashita (penalty missed); Tokuma Suzuki (penalty missed)

2 May 14	Gamba Osaka	5–0	Vissel Kobe	Osaka
	Harumi Minamino 22', 53'; Genta Miura 36'; Kanji Okunuki 80'; Deniz Hümmet 82'	Report	Yoshinori Muto (yellow card) 45+1'	Stadium: Suita City Football Stadium; Attendance: 33,314; Referee: Koki Nagamine

6 May 15	Nagoya Grampus	2–1	Gamba Osaka	Toyota
	Sho Inagaki 8'; Yudai Kimura 32'	Report	Rin Minto 90+5'; Shuto Abe (yellow card) 12'; Ryotaro Meshino (yellow card) 80'	Stadium: Toyota Stadium; Attendance: 38,880; Referee: Koji Takasaki

10 May 16	Gamba Osaka	0–1	Sanfrecce Hiroshima	Osaka
		Report	Shunki Higashi 68'; Hayao Kawabe (yellow card) 49'; Naoto Arai (yellow card) 61'	Stadium: Suita City Football Stadium; Attendance: 28,360; Referee: Damian Kos (Poland)

22 April 17 (Rescheduled)	Gamba Osaka	1–2	Avispa Fukuoka	Osaka
	Harumi Minamino 9'; Kanji Okunuki (yellow card) 82'	Report	Yutaka Michiwaki 45'; Kazuki Fujimoto 45+5' (yellow card) 81'; Daiki Miya (yellow card) 24'; Yuji Kitajima (yellow card) 62'	Stadium: Suita City Football Stadium; Attendance: 15,003; Referee: Hayato Shimizu

24 May 18	Shimizu S-Pulse	1–2	Gamba Osaka	Shizuoka
	Masaki Yumiba 57'; Jelani Reshaun Sumiyoshi (yellow card) 65'	Report	Harumi Minamino 61', 75'; Rin Minto (yellow card) 15'; Tokuma Suzuki (yellow card) 79'; Takato Yamamoto (yellow card) 90'	Stadium: IAI Stadium Nihondaira; Attendance: 53,439; Referee: Akihiko Ikeuchi

30 May Placement Leg 1	Gamba Osaka	1–1	Tokyo Verdy	Osaka
	Shogo Sasaki 41'	Report	Yuya Fukuda 47'	Stadium: Suita City Football Stadium; Attendance: 29,924; Referee: Yusuke Ohashi

6 June Placement Leg 2	Tokyo Verdy	2–4 (3–5 agg.)	Gamba Osaka	Chōfu
	Takeru Kishimoto 45+1' (o.g.); Ginjiro Ikegaya 82' (o.g.); Rei Hirakawa (yellow card) 16'	Report	Gaku Nawata 16', 89'; Shinya Nakano 49' (yellow card) 61'; Shoji Toyama 90+7'; Yuki Yoshihara (yellow card) 38'; Shogo Sasaki (yellow card) 58'	Stadium: Ajinomoto Stadium; Attendance: 20,361; Referee: Futoshi Nakamura

=== AFC Champions League Two ===
==== Group stage ====
Pos	Team	Pld	Pts	GOS	RPM	TND	EAS
1	(Japan) Gamba Osaka	6	18	—	2–0	3–1	3–1
2	(Thailand) Ratchaburi	6	9	0–2	—	2–0	5–1
3	(Vietnam) Nam Định	6	9	0–1	3–1	—	9–0
4	(Hong Kong) Eastern	6	0	0–5	0–7	0–1	—

Source: ACL2

==== Knockout stage ====
12 February 2025 Rd of 16 Leg 1	Pohang Steelers (South Korea)	1–1	(Japan) Gamba Osaka	Pohang, South Korea
	Jorge Teixeira 70'	Report	Ryoya Yamashita 47'; Shinnosuke Nakatani (yellow card) 86'	Stadium: Pohang Steel Yard; Attendance: 4,589; Referee: Ahmad A'Qashah (Singapore)

19 February 2025 Rd of 16 Leg 2	Gamba Osaka (Japan)	2–1 (3–2 agg.)	(South Korea) Pohang Steelers	Osaka, Japan
	Deniz Hümmet 34'; Ryoya Yamashita 41'; Masaaki Higashiguchi (yellow card) 80'	Report	Kento Nishiya 61'	Stadium: Suita City Football Stadium; Attendance: 9,456; Referee: Casey Reibelt (Australia)

4 March 2026 Quarter Final Leg 1	Gamba Osaka (Japan)	1–1	(Thailand) Ratchaburi	Osaka, Japan
	Gaku Nawata 84'; Takeru Kishimoto (yellow card) 78'	Report	Daniel Ting 18'; Thossawat Limwanasathian (yellow card) 36'	Stadium: Suita City Football Stadium; Attendance: 7,024; Referee: Alex King (Australia)

11 March 2026 Quarter Final Leg 2	Ratchaburi (Thailand)	1–2 (a.e.t.) (2–3 agg.)	(Japan) Gamba Osaka	Ratchaburi, Thailand
	Gleyson 50'; Denison (penalty missed) 67; Roque Mesa (yellow card) 90+3'	Report	Genta Miura 28'; Welton Felipe 99'; Riku Handa (yellow card) 64'; Ryo Hatsuse (yellow card) 77'; Shuto Abe (yellow card) 94'; Issam Jebali (yellow card) 116'	Stadium: Dragon Solar Park; Attendance: 9,862; Referee: Ko Hyung-jin (South Korea)

8 April 2026 Semi Final Leg 1	Gamba Osaka (Japan)	0–1	(Thailand) Bangkok United	Osaka, Japan
	Shinnosuke Nakatani (red card) 75'	Report	Muhsen Al-Ghassani 15' (pen.); Jakkaphan Praisuwan (yellow card) 80'; Patiwat Khammai (yellow card) 90'	Stadium: Suita City Football Stadium; Attendance: 12,150; Referee: Nazmi Nasaruddin (Malaysia)

15 April 2026 Semi Final Leg 2	Bangkok United (Thailand)	0–3 (1–3 agg.)	(Japan) Gamba Osaka	Bangkok, Thailand
	Teerasil Dangda (yellow card) 39'; Richairo Zivkovic (yellow card) 85'; Arthur de Moura (yellow card) 87'	Report	Ryoya Yamashita 20'; Issam Jebali 40' (penalty missed) 40; Ryotaro Meshino 83'; Shuto Abe (yellow card) 21'; Ryo Hatsuse (yellow card) 57'	Stadium: Rajamangala Stadium; Attendance: 13,310; Referee: Kim Jong-Hyeok (South Korea)

16 May 2026 Final	Al-Nassr (Saudi Arabia)	0–1	(Japan) Gamba Osaka	Riyadh, Saudi Arabia
	Nawaf Al-Aqidi (yellow card) 51'; Abdulrahman Ghareeb (yellow card) 64'	Report	Deniz Hümmet 30'	Stadium: Al-Awwal Park; Referee: Abdullah Jamali (Kuwait)

=== 2026–27 AFC Champions League Elite ===
==== Qualifying stage ====
11 August 2026 Playoff	Gangwon (South Korea)	0–1 (a.e.t.)	(Japan) Gamba Osaka	Gangwon, South Korea
19:30 UTC+9	Nawata 103'	Report		Stadium: Gangneung Stadium; Attendance: 5,404; Referee: Salman Falahi (Qatar)

== Team statistics ==
=== Appearances and goals ===
As of 6 June 2026

No.	Pos.	Player	J1 League		2025/26 AFC Champions League Two		Total	
No.	Pos.	Player	Apps.	Goals	Apps.	Goals	Apps.	Goals
1	GK	(Japan) Masaaki Higashiguchi	12	0	6	0	18	0
2	DF	(Japan) Shota Fukuoka	1+1	0	0	0	2	0
3	DF	(Japan) Riku Handa	7+3	1	5	0	15	1
4	DF	(Japan) Shinnosuke Nakatani	19	1	6	0	23	1
5	DF	(Japan) Genta Miura	15+1	1	6	1	22	2
7	MF	(Japan) Takashi Usami	5+4	0	0+1	0	9	0
8	MF	(Japan) Ryotaro Meshino	8+9	2	6+1	1	24	3
9	FW	(Japan) Daichi Hayashi	0+1	0	0	0	1	0
10	MF	(Japan) Shu Kurata	3+7	0	0+3	0	13	0
11	FW	(Tunisia) Issam Jebali	8+3	1	6	1	17	2
13	MF	(Japan) Shuto Abe	11+3	0	6+1	0	21	0
15	DF	(Japan) Takeru Kishimoto	10+2	1	2+4	0	18	1
16	MF	(Japan) Tokuma Suzuki	11+3	0	5+2	0	21	0
17	FW	(Japan) Ryoya Yamashita	14+4	1	6+1	3	25	4
18	GK	(Japan) Rui Araki	7	0	1	0	8	0
19	DF	(Japan) Ikegaya Ginjiro	5+3	0	1	0	9	0
21	DF	(Japan) Ryō Hatsuse	15+1	0	7	0	23	0
22	GK	(Japan) Jun Ichimori	1	0	0	0	1	0
23	FW	(Turkey) (Sweden) Deniz Hümmet	14+4	8	7	2	25	10
27	MF	(Japan) Rin Mito	13+3	1	3+4	0	23	1
32	MF	(Japan) Yuki Yoshihara	2	0	0	0	2	0
34	DF	(Japan) Yuya Yokoi	0	0	0	0	0	0
35	MF	(Japan) Taiki Tono	1+1	0	0	0	2	0
36	MF	(Japan) Takato Yamamoto	1+4	0	0+1	0	6	0
38	MF	(Japan) Gaku Nawata	4+6	2	0+3	1	13	3
40	FW	(Japan) Shoji Toyama	1+5	1	0+2	0	8	1
41	MF	(Japan) Jiro Nakamura	0+3	0	0	0	3	0
42	FW	(Japan) Harumi Minamino	7+10	7	1+5	0	23	7
44	FW	(Japan) Kanji Okunuki	6+8	1	0+3	0	17	1
45	MF	(Japan) Kaita Maruoka	0+1	0	0	0	1	0
47	MF	(Japan) Shinya Nakano	4+4	1	0+1	0	9	1
48	MF	(Japan) Yoshiki Fujimoto	0+1	0	0	0	1	0
55	FW	(Japan) Asahi Uenaka	0	0	0	0	0	0
67	DF	(Japan) Shogo Sasaki	3	1	1	0	4	1
97	FW	(Brazil) Welton Felipe	7+4	1	1+3	1	15	2
Players featured on a match for the team, but left the club mid-season, either permanently or on loan transfer
6	FW	(Japan) Makoto Mitsuta	0+1	0	1	0	2	0
30	DF	(Germany) Philipp Max	0	0	0	0	0	0
