= 2026 AFC Champions League Two final =

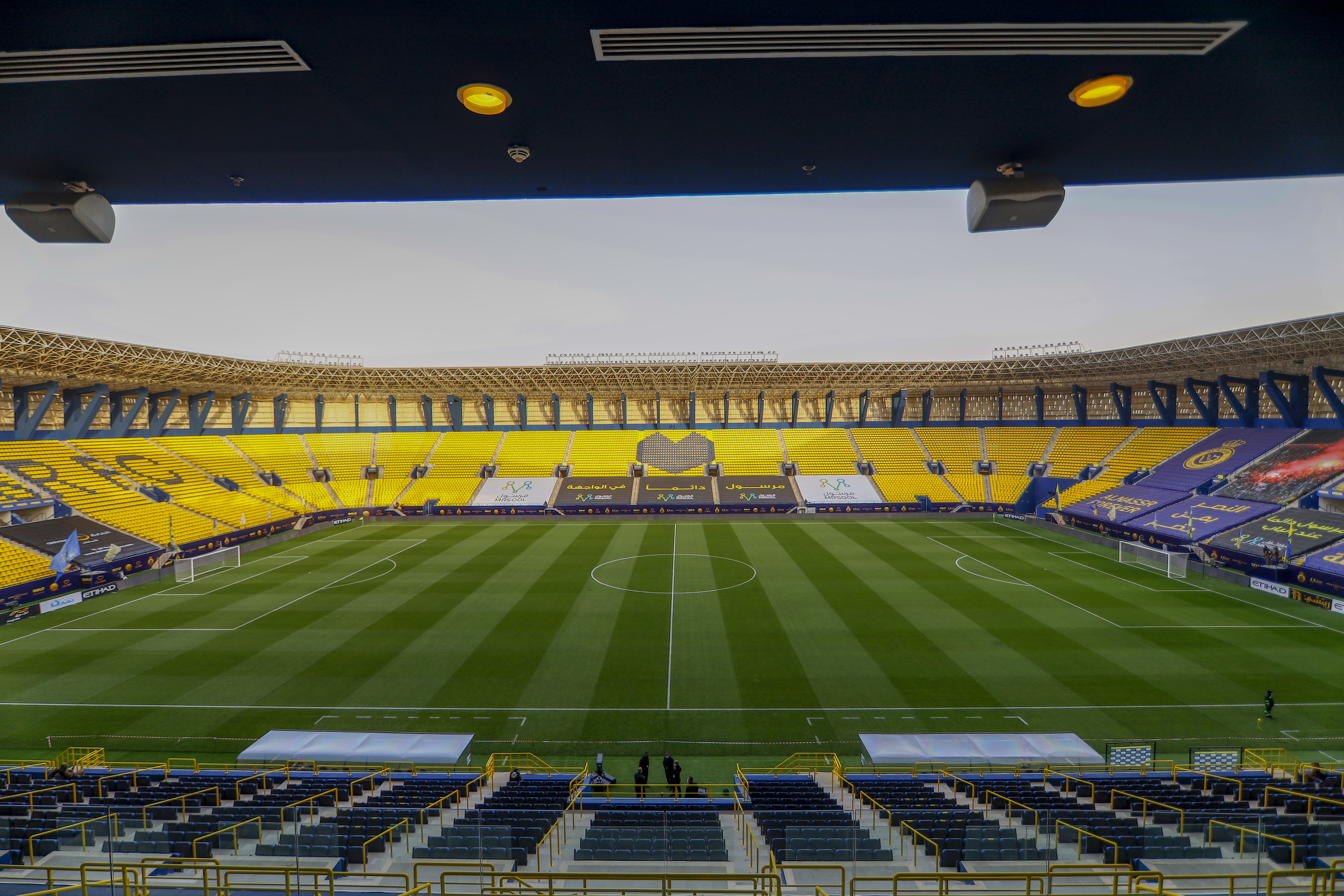
- The King Saud University Stadium in Riyadh hosted the final.
- Event: AFC Champions League Two
Al-Nassr	Gamba Osaka
(Saudi Arabia)	(Japan)
0	1
- Date: 16 May 2026
- Venue: King Saud University Stadium, Riyadh
- Man of the Match: (Japan) Rui Araki
- Referee: Abdullah Jamali (Kuwait)
- Attendance: 25,207
- Weather: Clear; 33 °C (91 °F)

The 2026 AFC Champions League Two final was the final match of the 2025–26 AFC Champions League Two, the 21st season of Asia's secondary club football tournament organised by the Asian Football Confederation (AFC), and the second since it was rebranded as the AFC Champions League Two. It was played on 16 May 2026.

The winners, Gamba Osaka, were given an indirect preliminary stage slot for the 2026–27 AFC Champions League Elite since they had not already qualified through their domestic league.

== Teams ==
Team	Region (Federation)	Previous finals appearances (bold indicates winners)
(Japan) Gamba Osaka	East (EAFF)	None
(Saudi Arabia) Al-Nassr	West (WAFF)	None

== Venue ==
The final venue was pre-determined on a rotation basis, with the match hosted by the Al-Nassr in Riyadh, Saudi Arabia.

== Route to the final ==
Note: In all results below, the score of the finalist is given first (H: home; A: away; N: neutral).

Al-Nassr (Saudi Arabia)				Round	(Japan) Gamba Osaka			
Opponent	Result			Group stage	Opponent	Result		
(Tajikistan) Istiklol	5–0 (H)			Matchday 1	(Hong Kong) Eastern	3–1 (H)		
(Iraq) Al-Zawraa	2–0 (A)			Matchday 2	(Thailand) Ratchaburi	2–0 (A)		
(India) Goa	2–1 (A)			Matchday 3	(Vietnam) Nam Định	3–1 (H)		
(India) Goa	4–0 (H)			Matchday 4	(Vietnam) Nam Định	1–0 (A)		
(Tajikistan) Istiklol	4–0 (A)			Matchday 5	(Hong Kong) Eastern	5–0 (A)		
(Iraq) Al-Zawraa	5–1 (H)			Matchday 6	(Thailand) Ratchaburi	2–0 (H)		
**Group D winners**: Pos / Team / Pld / Pts; **1** / (Saudi Arabia) Al-Nassr / **6** / **18**; 2 / (Iraq) Al-Zawraa / 6 / **9**; 3 / (Tajikistan) Istiklol / 6 / **9**; 4 / (India) Goa / 6 / **0**; Source: ACL2				Final standings	**Group F winners**: Pos / Team / Pld / Pts; **1** / (Japan) Gamba Osaka / **6** / **18**; 2 / (Thailand) Ratchaburi / 6 / **9**; 3 / (Vietnam) Nam Định / 6 / **9**; 4 / (Hong Kong) Eastern / 6 / **0**; Source: ACL2			
Opponent	Agg.	1st leg	2nd leg	Knockout stage	Opponent	Agg.	1st leg	2nd leg
(Turkmenistan) Arkadag	2–0	1–0 (A)	1–0 (H)	Round of 16	(South Korea) Pohang Steelers	3–2	1–1 (A)	2–1 (H)
(United Arab Emirates) Al Wasl	4–0 (N)			Quarter-finals	(Thailand) Ratchaburi	3–2	1–1 (H)	2–1 (a.e.t.) (A)
(Qatar) Al Ahli	5–1 (N)			Semi-finals	(Thailand) Bangkok United	3–1	0–1 (H)	3–0 (A)

== Match ==
=== Details ===
16 May 2026
20:45 UTC+3

Al-Nassr (Saudi Arabia)	0–1	(Japan) Gamba Osaka
	Report	Hümmet 30'

King Saud University Stadium, Riyadh
Attendance: 25,207
Referee: Abdullah Jamali (Kuwait)

**Al-Nassr**	**Gamba Osaka**

GK	24	(Brazil) Bento
RB	12	(Saudi Arabia) Nawaf Boushal		(substituted off) 46'
CB	3	(France) Mohamed Simakan
CB	26	(Spain) Iñigo Martínez
LB	23	(Saudi Arabia) Ayman Yahya		(substituted off) 66'
RM	29	(Saudi Arabia) Abdulrahman Ghareeb	(yellow card) 64'	(substituted off) 66'
CM	19	(Saudi Arabia) Ali Al-Hassan		(substituted off) 80'
CM	96	(Saudi Arabia) Saad Al-Nasser		(substituted off) 56'
LM	10	(Senegal) Sadio Mané
CF	79	(Portugal) João Félix
CF	7	(Portugal) Cristiano Ronaldo (c)
Substitutes:
GK	1	(Saudi Arabia) Nawaf Al-Aqidi
GK	53	(Saudi Arabia) Abdulrahman Al-Otaibi
DF	2	(Saudi Arabia) Sultan Al-Ghannam		(substituted on) 46'
DF	4	(Saudi Arabia) Nader Al-Sharari
DF	70	(Saudi Arabia) Awad Aman
DF	83	(Saudi Arabia) Salem Al-Najdi		(substituted on) 66'
MF	8	(Iraq) Hayder Abdulkareem
MF	20	(Brazil) Ângelo		(substituted on) 56'
FW	9	(Saudi Arabia) Abdullah Al-Hamdan		(substituted on) 80'
FW	16	(Saudi Arabia) Mohammed Maran
FW	21	(France) Kingsley Coman		(substituted on) 66'
FW	60	(Saudi Arabia) Saad Haqawi
Manager:
(Portugal) Jorge Jesus

GK	18	(Japan) Rui Araki
RB	15	(Japan) Takeru Kishimoto
CB	5	(Japan) Genta Miura
CB	20	(Japan) Shinnosuke Nakatani (c)
LB	21	(Japan) Ryō Hatsuse
CM	16	(Japan) Tokuma Suzuki	(substituted off) 60'
CM	27	(Japan) Rin Mito
RW	17	(Japan) Ryoya Yamashita	(substituted off) 60'
AM	11	(Tunisia) Issam Jebali	(substituted off) 80'
LW	8	(Japan) Ryotaro Meshino	(substituted off) 70'
CF	23	(Turkey) Deniz Hümmet	(substituted off) 46'
Substitutes:
GK	1	(Japan) Masaaki Higashiguchi
GK	22	(Japan) Jun Ichimori
DF	19	(Japan) Ginjiro Ikegaya
DF	33	(Japan) Shinya Nakano
MF	10	(Japan) Shu Kurata
MF	13	(Japan) Shuto Abe	(substituted on) 60'
MF	36	(Japan) Takato Yamamoto
MF	44	(Japan) Kanji Okunuki	(substituted on) 60'
FW	7	(Japan) Takashi Usami	(substituted on) 80'
FW	40	(Japan) Shoji Toyama
FW	42	(Japan) Harumi Minamino	(substituted on) 46'
FW	97	(Brazil) Welton	(substituted on) 70'
Manager:
(Germany) Jens Wissing

Man of the Match:

(Japan) Rui Araki (Gamba Osaka)

Assistant referees:

Ali Jaragh (Kuwait)
Saud Al-Shammari (Kuwait)

Fourth official:

Ammar Ashkanani (Kuwait)

Reserve assistant referee:

Abdulhadi Al-Anzi (Kuwait)

Video assistant referee:

Mohammed Obaid Khadim (United Arab Emirates)

Assistant video assistant referee:

Abdullah Al-Kandari (Kuwait)

**Match rules**

- 90 minutes
- 30 minutes of extra time if necessary
- Penalty shoot-out if scores still level
- Maximum of twelve named substitutes
- Maximum of five substitutions, with a sixth allowed in extra time
- Maximum of three substitution opportunities, with a fourth allowed in extra time

== See also ==
- 2026 AFC Champions League Elite final
- 2026 AFC Challenge League final
- 2026 AFC Women's Champions League final
- 2026 Al-Nassr FC season
- 2026 Gamba Osaka season
