= 2025 Gamba Osaka season =

Gamba Osaka
2025 season
- Chairman: Takashi Yamauchi
- Head coach: Dani Poyatos
- Stadium: Panasonic Stadium Suita
- Average home league attendance: 29,924
Home colours	Away colours

The 2025 Gamba Osaka season was the club's 45th season in existence and the twelfth consecutive season in the top flight of Japanese football. Having finished 4th in the 2024 J.League 1, they qualify for the 2025-2026 AFC Champions League Two.

== Squad ==
Squad no.	Name	Nationality	Date of birth	Last Team
Goalkeepers
1	Masaaki Higashiguchi	(Japan)	12 May 1986 (age 39)	(Japan) Albirex Niigata
18	Rui Araki	(Japan)	14 October 2007 (age 18)	Youth Team
22	Jun Ichimori	(Japan)	2 July 1991 (age 34)	(Japan) Yokohama F. Marinos
31	Zhang Aolin ^{Type 2}	(Japan) (China)	25 May 2005 (age 20)	Youth Team
Defenders
2	Shota Fukuoka	(Japan)	24 October 1995 (age 30)	(Japan) Tokushima Vortis
3	Riku Handa	(Japan)	1 January 2002 (age 24)	(Japan) Montedio Yamagata
4	Keisuke Kurokawa	(Japan)	13 April 1997 (age 28)	(Japan) Kansai University
5	Genta Miura	(Japan)	1 March 1995 (age 30)	(Japan) Shimizu S-Pulse
15	Takeru Kishimoto	(Japan)	16 July 1997 (age 28)	(Japan) Shimizu S-Pulse
20	Shinnosuke Nakatani	(Japan)	24 March 1996 (age 29)	(Japan) Nagoya Grampus
21	Ryo Hatsuse	(Japan)	10 July 1997 (age 28)	(England) Sheffield Wednesday
67	Shogo Sasaki	(Japan)	25 July 2000 (age 25)	(Japan) JEF United Chiba
Midfielders
7	Takashi Usami (c)	(Japan)	6 May 1992 (age 33)	(Germany) Fortuna Düsseldorf
8	Ryotaro Meshino	(Japan)	8 June 1998 (age 27)	(Portugal) Estoril
10	Shu Kurata	(Japan)	26 November 1988 (age 37)	(Japan) Cerezo Osaka
13	Shuto Abe	(Japan)	5 December 1997 (age 28)	(Belgium) R.W.D. Molenbeek
16	Tokuma Suzuki	(Japan)	12 March 1997 (age 28)	(Japan) Cerezo Osaka
27	Rin Mito	(Japan)	12 February 2002 (age 24)	(Japan) Kwansei Gakuin University
38	Gaku Nawata	(Japan)	26 July 2006 (age 19)	(Japan) Kamimura Gakuen High School
47	Juan Alano	(Brazil)	2 September 1996 (age 29)	(Japan) Kashima Antlers
Forwards
9	Daichi Hayashi	(Japan)	23 May 1997 (age 28)	(Germany) 1. FC Nürnberg
11	Issam Jebali	(Tunisia)	25 December 1991 (age 34)	(Denmark) Odense Boldklub
17	Ryoya Yamashita	(Japan)	19 October 1997 (age 28)	(Japan) Yokohama FC
23	Deniz Hümmet	(Turkey) (Sweden)	13 September 1996 (age 29)	(Sweden) Djurgårdens
42	Harumi Minamino	(Japan)	13 May 2004 (age 21)	(Japan) Tochigi SC
44	Kanji Okunuki	(Japan)	11 August 1999 (age 26)	(Germany) 1. FC Nürnberg
51	Makoto Mitsuta	(Japan)	20 July 1999 (age 26)	(Japan) Sanfrecce Hiroshima
97	Welton Felipe	(Brazil)	23 May 1997 (age 28)	(Bulgaria) Levski Sofia
Players loan out
19	Ibuki Konno	(Japan)	10 May 2001 (age 24)	(Japan) Ehime FC
33	Shinya Nakano	(Japan)	17 August 2003 (age 22)	(Japan) Sagan Tosu
40	Shoji Toyama	(Japan)	21 September 2002 (age 23)	(Japan) Roasso Kumamoto
41	Jiro Nakamura	(Japan)	2 August 2003 (age 22)	(Japan) Matsumoto Yamaga
Players left during mid-season
6	Neta Lavi	(Israel)	25 August 1996 (age 29)	(Israel) Maccabi Haifa
13	Isa Sakamoto	(Japan)	26 August 2003 (age 22)	(Japan) Fagiano Okayama
24	Yusei Egawa	(Japan)	24 October 2000 (age 25)	(Japan) V-Varen Nagasaki

Last updated: 10 March 2023.
Source: Gamba Osaka website

== Club officials ==
Club officials for 2026.

Position	Name
Manager	(Germany) Jens Wissing
Assistant manager	(Germany) Harry Pufal
Special Advisor to head coach	(Germany) Jorn Erik Wolf
Physical coach	(Germany) Timo Rosenberg
Interpreter	(Japan) Yuki Masuda (Japan) Matsuzaki Yutaka

== Transfers ==
=== Pre-season ===
==== In ====
Transfers in

Date	Position	Player	Transferred from	Ref
Permanent Transfer
15 December 2024	GK	(Japan) Kosei Tani	(Japan) Machida Zelvia	End of loan
15 December 2024	MF	(Japan) Jiro Nakamura	(Japan) Matsumoto Yamaga	End of loan
15 December 2024	FW	(Japan) Harumi Minamino	(Japan) Tochigi SC	End of loan
15 December 2024	FW	(Japan) Shoji Toyama	(Japan) Roasso Kumamoto	End of loan
15 December 2024	FW	(Japan) Hiroto Yamami	(Japan) Tokyo Verdy	End of loan
15 December 2024	FW	(Japan) (Jamaica) Musashi Suzuki	(Japan) Hokkaido Consadole Sapporo	End of loan
15 December 2024	MF	(Japan) Gaku Nawata	(Japan) Kamimura Gakuen High School	Free
20 December 2024	DF	(Japan) Shogo Sasaki	(Japan) JEF United Chiba	Undisclosed
6 January 2025	FW	(Japan) Kanji Okunuki	(Germany) 1. FC Nürnberg	Free
8 March 2025	FW	(Turkey) (Sweden) Deniz Hümmet	(Sweden) Djurgårdens	Free
Loan Transfer
27 February 2025	FW	(Japan) Makoto Mitsuta	(Japan) Sanfrecce Hiroshima	Season Loan till 31 Jan 2026

==== Out ====
Transfers out

Date	Position	Player	Transferred To	Ref
Permanent Transfer
26 December 2024	MF	(Japan) Yuya Fukuda	(Japan) Tokyo Verdy	Free
26 December 2024	FW	(Japan) Hiroto Yamami	(Japan) Tokyo Verdy	Free
27 December 2024	GK	(Japan) Kei Ishikawa	(Japan) Ventforet Kofu	Free
4 January 2025	GK	(Japan) Kosei Tani	(Japan) Machida Zelvia	Free
5 January 2025	MF	(Japan) Naohiro Sugiyama	(Japan) JEF United Chiba	Free
6 January 2025	DF	(Japan) (Indonesia) Riku Matsuda	(Japan) Vissel Kobe	Free
6 January 2025	FW	(Japan) (Jamaica) Musashi Suzuki	(Japan) Yokohama FC	Free
12 January 2025	MF	(Brazil) Dawhan	(China) Beijing Guoan	Free
3 March 2025	MF	(Japan) Kota Yamada	(Japan) Yokohama FC	Free
Loan Transfer
3 January 2025	MF	(Japan) Ibuki Konno	(Japan) Ehime FC	Season loan
5 January 2025	FW	(Japan) Ryuta Takahashi	(Japan) Giravanz Kitakyushu	Season loan
6 January 2025	MF	(Japan) Jiro Nakamura	(Japan) FC Gifu	Season loan
12 January 2025	FW	(Japan) Isa Sakamoto	(Belgium) K.V.C. Westerlo	Season loan (Note: Isa Sakamoto's loan made permanent in June 2025.)

=== Mid-season ===
==== In ====
Transfers in

Date	Position	Player	Transferred from	Ref
Permanent Transfer
27 May 2025	MF	(Japan) Shuto Abe	(Belgium) R.W.D. Molenbeek	Free
14 August 2025	DF	(Japan) Ryo Hatsuse	(England) Sheffield Wednesday	Free

==== Out ====
Transfers out

Date	Position	Player	Transferred To	Ref
Permanent Transfer
4 June 2025	MF	(Japan) Yusei Egawa	(Japan) V-Varen Nagasaki	Free
20 June 2025	FW	(Japan) Isa Sakamoto	(Belgium) K.V.C. Westerlo	Undisclosed
12 August 2025	MF	(Israel) Neta Lavi	(Japan) FC Machida Zelvia	Undisclosed
12 August 2025	FW	(Japan) Shoji Toyama	(Japan) Tokyo Verdy	Undisclosed
Loan Transfer
August 2025	MF	(Japan) Shinya Nakano	(Japan) Shonan Bellmare	Season loan

== Friendly ==
=== Pre-season ===
Win Draw Loss

21 January 2025 1	Mito Hollyhock (Japan)	0-2	(Japan) Gamba Osaka	Okinawa, Japan
				Stadium: Gosamaru Athletic Field

24 January 2025 2	Hokkaido Consadole Sapporo (Japan)	2-2	(Japan) Gamba Osaka	Okinawa, Japan
	Tatsuya Hasegawa; Katsuyuki Tanaka		82' (o.g.); Tokuma Suzuki 87'	Stadium: Gosamaru Athletic Field

28 January 2025 3	Urawa Reds Diamonds (Japan)	4-2	(Japan) Gamba Osaka	Okinawa, Japan
	Thiago Santana 65'; Taishi Matsumoto 77', 88'; Shoya Nakajima 110'		Issam Jebali 100'; Ryoya Yamashita 122'	Stadium: Gosamaru Athletic Field

1 February 2025 4	V-Varen Nagasaki (Japan)	5-5	(Japan) Gamba Osaka	Okinawa, Japan
				Stadium: Gosamaru Athletic Field

== Competitions ==
=== J1 League ===
Pos	Team	Pld	W	D	L	GF	GA	GD	Pts
7	Urawa Red Diamonds	38	16	11	11	45	39	+6	59
8	Kawasaki Frontale	38	15	12	11	66	56	+10	57
9	Gamba Osaka	38	17	6	15	53	55	−2	57
10	Cerezo Osaka	38	14	10	14	60	57	+3	52
11	FC Tokyo	38	13	11	14	41	48	−7	50

Source: JLeague.co, JLeague.jp, J.League Data Site
Rules for classification: 1) Points; 2) Goal difference; 3) Goals scored; 4) Head-to-head points; 5) Head-to-head goal difference; 6) Head-to-head goals scored; 7) Fewer disciplinary points.

==== Matches ====
14 February 1	Gamba Osaka	2–5	Cerezo Osaka	Osaka
	Neta Lavi 31'; Keisuke Kurokawa 54'	Report	Sota Kitano 7', 46'; Shinji Kagawa 52'; Shunta Tanaka 63'; Motohiko Nakajima 90+3'	Stadium: Suita City Football Stadium; Attendance: 34,860; Referee: Hiroyuki Kimura

22 February 2	Gamba Osaka	2–1	Avispa Fukuoka	Osaka
	Shu Kurata 22', 58'	Report	Tomoya Miki 87'; Hiroki Akino (yellow card) 84'; Takumi Kamijima (yellow card) 90+1'	Stadium: Suita City Football Stadium; Attendance: 22,614; Referee: Shu Kawamata

26 February 3	Fagiano Okayama	2–0	Gamba Osaka	Okayama
	Takahiro Yanagi 45'; Kazunari Ichimi 48'	Report	Yusei Egawa (yellow card) 90'	Stadium: JFE Harenokuni Stadium; Attendance: 13,555; Referee: Koki Nagamine

2 March 4	Tokyo Verdy	0–1	Gamba Osaka	Chōfu
	Yuto Tsunashima (yellow card) 66'; Yuan Matsuhashi (yellow card) 79'	Report	Issam Jebali 85' (yellow card) 74'	Stadium: Ajinomoto Stadium; Attendance: 21,260; Referee: Keigo Sendachi

8 March 5	Gamba Osaka	1–0	Shimizu S-Pulse	Osaka
	Ryoya Yamashita 36' (yellow card) 43'; Makoto Mitsuta (yellow card) 51'; Tokuma Suzuki (yellow card) 69'; Jun Ichimori (yellow card) 82'	Report	Zento Uno (yellow card) 67'	Stadium: Suita City Football Stadium; Attendance: 29,071; Referee: Ryo Tanimoto

16 March 6	Yokohama F. Marinos	2–0	Gamba Osaka	Yokohama
	Daiya Tono 20'; Asahi Uenaka 75'; Park Il-gyu (yellow card) 68'; Kenta Inoue (yellow card) 88'	Report	Shu Kurata (yellow card) 35'	Stadium: Nissan Stadium; Attendance: 23,169; Referee: Nathan Verboomen (Belgium)

29 March 7	Albirex Niigata	3–3	Gamba Osaka	Niigata
	Motoki Hasegawa 18'; Jin Okumura 74'; Ken Yamura 82'	Report	Issam Jebali 43', 67'; Takashi Usami 90+7'	Stadium: Denka Big Swan Stadium; Attendance: 20,497; Referee: Masuya Ueda

2 April 8	Gamba Osaka	0–1	Machida Zelvia	Osaka
		Report	Yuki Soma 43'; Kotaro Hayashi (yellow card) 79'	Stadium: Suita City Football Stadium; Attendance: 23,125; Referee: Takafumi Mikuriya

6 April 9	Kashiwa Reysol	1–0	Gamba Osaka	Chiba
	Yoshio Koizumi 65'	Report	Neta Lavi (yellow card) 31'; Issam Jebali (yellow card) 37'	Stadium: Sankyo Frontier Kashiwa Stadium; Attendance: 12,833; Referee: Koei Koya

12 April 10	Gamba Osaka	2–0	Nagoya Grampus	Osaka
	Issam Jebali 63'; Ryoya Yamashita 76'	Report	Yuki Nogami (yellow card) 33'; Masahito Ono (yellow card) 36'	Stadium: Suita City Football Stadium; Attendance: 28,074; Referee: Ryo Tanimoto

20 April 11	Yokohama FC	1–1	Gamba Osaka	Yokohama
	Boniface Nduka 7'; Musahi Suzuki (yellow card) 30'; Lukian (yellow card) 38'; Kaili Shimbo (yellow card) 61'; Yuri Lara (yellow card) 89'	Report	Ryoya Yamashita 15'; Tokuma Suzuki (yellow card) 86'	Stadium: Mitsuzawa Stadium; Attendance: 9,697; Referee: Koji Takasaki

25 April 12	FC Tokyo	3–0	Gamba Osaka	Chōfu
	Kota Tawaratsumida 86'; Takahiro Ko 90'; Takeru Kishimoto 90+4' (o.g.); Teppei Oka (yellow card) 8'	Report		Stadium: Ajinomoto Stadium; Attendance: 44,519; Referee: Jumpei Ilda

29 April 13	Gamba Osaka	2–1	Kyoto Sanga	Osaka
	Takashi Usami 10'; Deniz Hümmet 26' (yellow card) 31'; Issam Jebali (yellow card) 74'	Report	Takuji Yonemoto 34'	Stadium: Suita City Football Stadium; Attendance: 30,620; Referee: Yudai Yamamoto

3 May 14	Gamba Osaka	4–0	Shonan Bellmare	Osaka
	Deniz Hümmet 2'; Takeru Kishimoto 13', 29'; Shinnosuke Nakatani 35' (yellow card) 51'; Takashi Usami (yellow card) 45+1'	Report	Kazuki Oiwa (yellow card) 40'	Stadium: Suita City Football Stadium; Attendance: 28,352; Referee: Akihiko Ikeuchi

6 May 15	Urawa Red Diamonds	0–1	Gamba Osaka	Saitama
	Takuya Ogiwara 78'	Report	Ryoya Yamashita 52'	Stadium: Saitama Stadium 2002; Attendance: 41,770; Referee: Koei Koya

11 May 16	Gamba Osaka	0–1	Sanfrecce Hiroshima	Osaka
		Report	Tsukasa Shiotani 33' (yellow card) 57'	Stadium: Suita City Football Stadium; Attendance: 30,633; Referee: Koichiro Fukushima

17 May 17	Vissel Kobe	3–2	Gamba Osaka	Kobe
	Yuya Osako 50', 90+6'; Matheus Thuler 59' (yellow card) 17'	Report	Shu Kurata 56'; Keisuke Kurokawa 73'	Stadium: Noevir Stadium Kobe; Attendance: 23,275; Referee: Ryo Tanimoto

25 May 18	Kawasaki Frontale	2–2	Gamba Osaka	Kawasaki
	Marcinho 32'; Tatsuya Ito 79'; Shin Yamada 90+7'	Report	Takashi Usami 53'; Ryoya Yamashita 60' (yellow card) 87'; Dani Poyatos (yellow card) 81'; Shinnosuke Nakatani 90+7'	Stadium: Kawasaki Todoroki Stadium; Attendance: 21,440; Referee: Keigo Sendachi

31 May 19	Gamba Osaka	0–1	Kashima Antlers	Osaka
		Report	Léo Ceará 9'	Stadium: Suita City Football Stadium; Attendance: 32,013; Referee: Takafumi Mikuriya

15 June 20	Shimizu S-Pulse	0–0	Gamba Osaka	Shizuoka
	Kai Matsuzaki (yellow card) 76'; Matheus Bueno (yellow card) 90+5'	Report	Shu Kurata (yellow card) 90+7'	Stadium: IAI Stadium Nihondaira; Attendance: 16,401; Referee: Koji Takasaki

22 June 21	Gamba Osaka	2–0	FC Tokyo	Osaka
	Takashi Usami 31'; Takeru Kishimoto 90+3'; Shuto Abe (yellow card) 17'	Report	Keigo Higashi (yellow card) 31'; Marcelo Ryan (yellow card) 40' (penalty missed) 51	Stadium: Suita City Football Stadium; Attendance: 28,747; Referee: Robert Jones (England)

28 June 22	Kyoto Sanga	3–1	Gamba Osaka	Kyoto
	Marco Tulio 17', 25'; Shinnosuke Fukuda 52'; Kyo Sato (yellow card) 79'	Report	Issam Jebali 89'; Shinnosuke Nakatani (yellow card) 5'; Takeru Kishimoto (yellow card) 47'	Stadium: Sanga Stadium by Kyocera; Attendance: 20,174; Referee: Łukasz Kuźma (Poland)

5 July 23	Cerezo Osaka	0–1	Gamba Osaka	Osaka
		Report	Riku Handa 70' (yellow card) 90'; Ryoya Yamashita (yellow card) 79'; Juan Alano (yellow card) 90+3'	Stadium: Yodoko Sakura Stadium; Attendance: 22,365; Referee: Ryo Tanimoto

20 July 24	Gamba Osaka	2–1	Kawasaki Frontale	Osaka
	Shu Kurata 45+3'; Deniz Hümmet 57' (yellow card) 35'; Welton Felipe (yellow card) 65'	Report	Yu Kobayashi 9'	Stadium: Suita City Football Stadium; Attendance: 31,898; Referee: Futoshi Nakamura

10 August 25	Gamba Osaka	0–3	Fagiano Okayama	Osaka
	Makoto Mitsuta (yellow card) 45+3'; Yūgo Tatsuta (yellow card) 63'	Report	Hiroto Iwabuchi 10', 36'; Takaya Kimura 89'; Ryūnosuke Satō (yellow card) 90+5'	Stadium: Suita City Football Stadium; Attendance: 35,245; Referee: Atsushi Kamimura

16 August 26	Sanfrecce Hiroshima	1–0	Gamba Osaka	Hiroshima
	Sota Nakamura 17'	Report	Ryoya Yamashita (yellow card) 11'; Issam Jebali (yellow card) 23'; Genta Miura (yellow card) 39'; Shuto Abe (red card) 60'; Kanji Okunuki (yellow card) 90+3'	Stadium: Edion Peace Wing Hiroshima; Attendance: 25,925; Referee: Takafumi Mikuriya

23 August 27	Gamba Osaka	3–2	Yokohama FC	Osaka
	Deniz Hümmet 45+4' (yellow card) 43'; Takashi Usami 56', 81'	Report	Adaílton 41'; Keisuke Muroi 90+1'; Boniface Nduka (yellow card) 54'	Stadium: Suita City Football Stadium; Attendance: 27,994; Referee: Hayato Shimizu

31 August 28	Shonan Bellmare	4–5	Gamba Osaka	Hiratsuka
	Rio Nitta 13'; Taiyo Hiraoka 37'; Yutaro Oda 45+4'; Kazuki Oiwa 90+10'; Koki Tachi (yellow card) (yellow-red card) 39'	Report	Shota Fukuoka 40'; Rin Mito 49'; Shinnosuke Nakatani 53'; Juan Alano 88' (yellow card) 90+11'; Ryoya Yamashita 90+7'	Stadium: Lemon Gas Stadium Hiratsuka; Attendance: 13,200; Referee: Yuzo Sutani

13 September 29	Gamba Osaka	1–0	Urawa Red Diamonds	Osaka
	Shuto Abe 85'; Ryo Hatsuse (yellow card) 55'	Report	Samuel Gustafson (yellow card) 65'; Isaac Kiese Thelin (yellow card) 88'; Yoichi Naganuma (yellow card) 90+5'	Stadium: Suita City Football Stadium; Attendance: 31,998; Referee: Ahmed El Shrief (Qatar)

20 August 30	Machida Zelvia	3–1	Gamba Osaka	Tokyo
	Gen Shoji 17'; Kotaro Hayashi 78'; Takuma Nishimura 90'; Shota Fujio (yellow card) 46'	Report	Deniz Hümmet 61'	Stadium: Japan National Stadium; Attendance: 10,108; Referee: Iván Barton (El Salvador)

23 September 31	Gamba Osaka	3–1	Yokohama F. Marinos	Osaka
	Makoto Mitsuta 65'; Deniz Hummet 70'; Takashi Usami 79'; Takanori Okai (yellow card) 75'	Report	Jun Amano 60'; Thomas Deng (yellow card) 90+1'	Stadium: Suita City Football Stadium; Attendance: 27,934; Referee: Keigo Sendachi

27 September 32	Gamba Osaka	4–2	Albirex Niigata	Osaka
	Takashi Usami 37'; Welton Felipe 60'; Shuto Abe 64'; Deniz Hümmet 74'	Report	Taiki Arai 15'; Jin Okumura 49'	Stadium: Suita City Football Stadium; Attendance: 26,768; Referee: Akihiko Ikeuchi

4 October 33	Kashima Antlers	0–0	Gamba Osaka	Tokyo
	Kento Misao (yellow card) 22'; Keisuke Tsukui (yellow card) 82'; Homare Tokuda (penalty missed) 90+4	Report	Takeru Kishimoto (yellow card) 52'	Stadium: Japan National Stadium; Attendance: 32,407; Referee: Yudai Yamamoto

18 October 34	Gamba Osaka	0–5	Kashiwa Reysol	Osaka
		Report	Yoshio Koizumi 7'; Nobuteru Nakagawa 15'; Diego 19', 51'; Mao Hosoya 73' (pen.); Riki Harakawa (yellow card) 90+2'	Stadium: Suita City Football Stadium; Attendance: 30,282; Referee: Koichiro Fukushima

25 October 35	Nagoya Grampus	0–2	Gamba Osaka	Toyota
		Report	Ryoya Yamashita 57'; Takeru Kishimoto 90+2'	Stadium: Toyota Stadium; Attendance: 30,084; Referee: Fu Ming (China PR)

8 November 36	Gamba Osaka	1–1	Vissel Kobe	Osaka
	Kanji Okunuki 80'; Riku Handa (yellow card) 31'; Masaaki Higashiguchi (red card) 78'	Report	Daiju Sasaki 89'; Yuki Honda (yellow card) 55'	Stadium: Suita City Football Stadium; Attendance: 34,695; Referee: Akihiko Ikeuchi

30 November 37	Avispa Fukuoka	1–0	Gamba Osaka	Fukuoka
	Daiki Matsuoka 55'; Tomoya Miki (yellow card) 53'; Yuma Obata (yellow card) 88'	Report	Deniz Hümmet (yellow card) 40'; Shuto Abe (yellow card) 45+1'	Stadium: Best Denki Stadium; Attendance: 17,587; Referee: Hiroyuki Kimura

6 December 38	Gamba Osaka	4–1	Tokyo Verdy	Osaka
	Issam Jebali 43' (pen.), 45+5'; Makoto Mitsuta 49'; Harumi Minamino 90+4'	Report	Itsuki Someno 78'; Yuta Arai (red card) 27'	Stadium: Suita City Football Stadium; Attendance: 33,627; Referee: Yudai Yamamoto

=== J.League Cup ===
20 March First round – Match 1	Kochi United	1–2	Gamba Osaka	Kochi
	Kokoro Kobayashi 77'; Hibiki Okazawa (yellow card) 59'	Report	Takashi Usami 13'; Shoji Toyama 41'; Shinya Nakano (yellow card) 37'; Shu Kurata (yellow card) 88'	Stadium: Kochi Haruno Sports Ground; Attendance: 6,929; Referee: Futoshi Nakamura

16 April First round – Match 2	Mito HollyHock	0–1	Gamba Osaka	Mito
	Shunsuke Saito (yellow card) 53'; Shunsuke Saito (yellow card) 53'	Report	Juan Alano 90+4'; Neta Lavi (yellow card) 69'; Ryoya Yamashita (yellow card) 90+7'	Stadium: K's denki Stadium Mito; Attendance: 3,331; Referee: Yoshimi Yamashita

21 May First round – Match 3	Júbilo Iwata	2–1 (a.e.t.)	Gamba Osaka	Shizuoka
	Deniz Hümmet 43'; Ryusei Yoshimura 110'; Ko Matsubara (yellow card) 39'; Jordy Croux (yellow card) 88'; John Hutchinson (yellow card) 88'	Report	Deniz Hümmet 43'; Keisuke Kurokawa (yellow card) 90+4'	Stadium: Yamaha Stadium; Attendance: 6,929; Referee: Naoto Uehara

=== Emperor's Cup ===
18 June Round 2	Gamba Osaka	2–1	Veertien Mie	Osaka
	Shogo Sasaki 58'; Deniz Hümmet 67'	Report	Shogo Otake 56'; Mizuki Aiba (yellow card) 84'	Stadium: Suita City Football Stadium; Attendance: 6,165; Referee: Yusuke Araki

16 July Round 3	Gamba Osaka	4–4 (a.e.t.) (3–4 p)	Montedio Yamagata	Osaka
	Issam Jebali 40', 74' (yellow card) 120+3'; Keisuke Kurokawa 60'; Shinnosuke Nakatani 120+3'; Shuto Abe (red card) 90'; Welton Felipe (yellow card) 118'	Report	Ryoma Kida 21', 31'; Junya Takahashi 79'; Kaina Yoshio 117'; Shintaro Kokubu (yellow card) 28'; Wataru Tanaka (yellow card) 120+2'	Stadium: Suita City Football Stadium; Attendance: 5,471; Referee: Yusuke Araki

=== AFC Champions League Two ===
==== Group stage ====
Pos	Team	Pld	W	D	L	GF	GA	GD	Pts	Qualification	GOS	RPM	TND	EAS
1	(Japan) Gamba Osaka	6	6	0	0	16	2	+14	18	Advance to round of 16	—	2–0	3–1	3–1
2	(Thailand) Ratchaburi	6	3	0	3	15	8	+7	9	Advance to round of 16	0–2	—	2–0	5–1
3	(Vietnam) Nam Định	6	3	0	3	14	7	+7	9		0–1	3–1	—	9–0
4	(Hong Kong) Eastern	6	0	0	6	2	30	−28	0		0–5	0–7	0–1	—

Source: ACL2
Rules for classification: Tiebreakers

17 October 2025 1	Gamba Osaka (Japan)	3–1	(Hong Kong) Eastern	Osaka, Japan
	Welton Felipe 28'; Takashi Usami 70'; Deniz Hümmet 75'; Ryoya Yamashita (yellow card) 90+1'	Report	Gil 29' (yellow card) 90+1'; Yu Okubo (yellow card) 14'; Calum Hall (red card) 72'	Stadium: Suita City Football Stadium; Attendance: 6,640; Referee: Meder Taichiev (Kyrgyzstan)

2 October 2025 2	Ratchaburi (Thailand)	0–2	(Japan) Gamba Osaka	Ratchaburi, Thailand
	Kritsananon Srisuwan (yellow card) 87'	Report	Shuto Abe 64'; Ryotaro Meshino 90+4'	Stadium: Dragon Solar Park; Referee: Yahya Almulla (United Arab Emirates)

22 October 2025 3	Gamba Osaka (Japan)	3–1	(Vietnam) Nam Dinh	Osaka, Japan
	Rin Mito 16'; Issam Jebali 52'; Walber 89' (o.g); Kanji Okunuki (yellow card) 51'	Report	Kyle Hudlin 90+4'; Mahmoud Eid (yellow card) 39'; Trần Văn Kiên (yellow card) 80'	Stadium: Suita City Football Stadium; Referee: Ahmed Khalil (Bahrain)

5 November 2025 4	Nam Dinh (Vietnam)	0–1	(Japan) Gamba Osaka	Ninh Bình, Vietnam
	Walber (yellow card) 58'; Mitchell Dijks (yellow card) 88'; Đặng Văn Tới (yellow card) 90+3'	Report	Rin Mito 8'; Shu Kurata (yellow card) 90+3'	Stadium: Thiên Trường Stadium; Referee: Baraa Aisha (Palestine)

27 November 2025 5	Eastern (Hong Kong)	0–5	(Japan) Gamba Osaka	Mong Kok, Hong Kong
	Daniel Almazan (yellow card) 27'; Gao Ming Ho (yellow card) 63'; Marcos Gondra (yellow card) 65'; Leung Kwun Chung (yellow card) 90+2'	Report	Shota Fukuoka 3'; Ryoya Yamashita 19'; Shuto Abe 33' (yellow card) 37'; Deniz Hümmet 59'; Gaku Nawata 75'; Kanji Okunuki (yellow card) 85'	Stadium: Mong Kok Stadium; Referee: Ahmad A'Qashah (Singapore)

11 December 2025 6	Gamba Osaka (Japan)	2–0	(Thailand) Ratchaburi	Osaka, Japan
	Gaku Nawata 53'; Ryoya Yamashita 79'; Daichi Hayashi (yellow card) 90+4'	Report	Sidcley (yellow card) 60'	Stadium: Suita City Football Stadium; Referee: Dong Fangyu (China)

==== Knockout stage ====
12 February 2026 Rd of 16 Leg 1	Pohang Steelers (South Korea)	1–1	(Japan) Gamba Osaka	Pohang, South Korea
	Jorge Teixeira 70'	Report	Ryoya Yamashita 47'; Shinnosuke Nakatani (yellow card) 86'	Stadium: Pohang Steel Yard; Referee: Ahmad A'Qashah (Singapore)

19 February 2026 Rd of 16 Leg 2	Gamba Osaka (Japan)	–	(South Korea) Pohang Steelers	Osaka, Japan
		Report		Stadium: Suita City Football Stadium

== Team statistics ==
=== Appearances and goals ===
As of 11 Dec 2025

No.	Pos.	Player	J1 League		J.League Cup		Emperor's Cup		2025/26 AFC Champions League Two		Total	
No.	Pos.	Player	Apps.	Goals	Apps.	Goals	Apps.	Goals	Apps.	Goals	Apps.	Goals
1	GK	(Japan) Masaaki Higashiguchi	1	0	3	0	0	0	6	0	10	0
2	DF	(Japan) Shota Fukuoka	32+2	1	0+3	0	1+1	0	2+1	1	42	2
3	DF	(Japan) Riku Handa	38	1	3	0	1+1	0	5	0	48	1
4	DF	(Japan) Keisuke Kurokawa	34+3	2	1	0	0+1	1	5	0	44	3
5	DF	(Japan) Genta Miura	5+3	0	0	0	2	0	6	0	16	0
6	MF	(Israel) Neta Lavi	15+3	1	2	0	2	0	0	0	22	1
7	MF	(Japan) Takashi Usami	22+9	8	1	1	0+1	0	2+2	1	37	10
8	MF	(Japan) Ryotaro Meshino	3+6	0	0	0	0	0	2+2	1	13	1
9	FW	(Japan) Daichi Hayashi	0	0	0	0	0	0	0+1	0	1	0
10	MF	(Japan) Shu Kurata	12+13	4	0+2	0	0+1	0	0+2	0	30	4
11	FW	(Tunisia) Issam Jebali	15+13	7	0+1	0	1	2	4+1	1	35	10
13	MF	(Japan) Shuto Abe	15	1	0	0	0+2	0	5+1	2	23	3
15	DF	(Japan) Takeru Kishimoto	5+19	4	2+1	0	1+1	0	1+4	0	34	4
16	MF	(Japan) Tokuma Suzuki	22+11	0	2+1	0	2	0	3+2	0	43	0
17	FW	(Japan) Ryoya Yamashita	27+6	7	1+2	0	1	0	4+2	2	43	9
20	DF	(Japan) Shinnosuke Nakatani	35	2	3	0	1+1	1	4	0	44	3
21	DF	(Japan) Ryō Hatsuse	4	0	0	0	0	0	1	0	5	0
22	GK	(Japan) Jun Ichimori	37	0	0	0	2	0	0	0	39	0
23	FW	(Turkey) (Sweden) Deniz Hümmet	21+8	6	3	1	1	1	2+3	2	38	10
27	MF	(Japan) Rin Mito	11+9	1	2	0	0	0	4	2	26	3
33	DF	(Japan) Shinya Nakano	0+7	0	2	0	2	0	0	0	11	0
38	MF	(Japan) Gaku Nawata	1+3	0	2	0	0	0	2	2	8	2
40	FW	(Japan) Shoji Toyama	0+5	0	0+1	1	0	0	0	0	6	1
42	FW	(Japan) Harumi Minamino	1+8	1	0+1	0	0	0	0+1	0	11	1
44	FW	(Japan) Kanji Okunuki	4+7	1	0	0	0	0	4+2	0	17	1
47	MF	(Brazil) Juan Alano	13+15	1	2+1	1	2	0	1	0	34	2
51	FW	(Japan) Makoto Mitsuta	30+5	2	0+3	0	2	0	2+3	0	45	2
67	DF	(Japan) Shogo Sasaki	3+4	0	2	0	1	1	0+2	0	12	1
97	FW	(Brazil) Welton Felipe	8+5	1	1	0	0+2	0	1	1	17	2
Players featured on a match for the team, but left the club on loan transfer
19	DF	(Japan) Ibuki Konno	0	0	0	0	0	0	0	0	0	0
Players featured on a match for the team, but left the club permanently
13	FW	(Japan) Isa Sakamoto	0	0	0	0	0	0	0	0	0	0
24	DF	(Japan) Yusei Egawa	2+2	0	1	0	0	0	0	0	5	0
