= Takato Yamamoto =

Japanese footballer (born 2007)

Takato Yamamoto 山本 天翔
Personal information
- Date of birth: 24 August 2007 (age 19)
- Place of birth: Osaka Prefecture, Japan
- Height: 1.77 m (5 ft 10 in)
- Position: Midfielder

Team information
- Current team: Borussia Dortmund II (on loan from Gamba Osaka)
- Number: 43

Youth career
- –2026: Gamba Osaka

Senior career*
Years	Team	Apps	(Gls)
2025–	Gamba Osaka	5	(0)
2026–	→ Borussia Dortmund II (loan)	6	(0)

International career^{‡}
2025	Japan U18	6	(2)
2026–	Japan U19	1	(1)
- * Club domestic league appearances and goals as of 23 September 2026 ‡ National team caps and goals as of 9 June 2026

Takato Yamamoto (山本 天翔, Yamamoto Takato; born 24 August 2007), is a Japanese professional footballer who plays as a midfielder for Regionalliga West club Borussia Dortmund II, on loan from J1 League club Gamba Osaka.

== Early life ==
Yamamoto was born on 24 August 2007. Born in Osaka Prefecture, Japan, he is a native of the prefecture.

== Club career ==
=== Gamba Osaka ===
As a youth player, Yamamoto joined the youth academy of Japanese side Gamba Osaka, where he captained their under-18 team and was promoted to the club's senior team in 2025. On 17 September 2025, he was first called up to the senior team during a 3–1 home win over Eastern in the AFC Champions League Two. Gamba Osaka went on to win the competition that season. On 22 February 2026, he debuted for them during a 2–1 away win over Fagiano Okayama in the league. Altogether, he made five league appearances for them during the 2026 season.

==== Loan to Borussia Dortmund ====
Ahead of the 2026–27 season, he was sent on loan to German side Borussia Dortmund II, the reserve team of Bundesliga side Borussia Dortmund. Upon arriving at the club, he trained with their senior team and debuted and scored his first goal for them unofficially during a 3–1 away friendly win over Rot-Weiß Oberhausen.

== International career ==
Yamamoto is a Japan youth international and has represented Japan internationally at under-18 and under-19 levels. Altogether, he made six appearances and scored two goals while playing for the Japan national under-18 football team.

During the summer of 2026, he traveled as a training partner with the Japan national football team to help prepare the latter for the 2026 FIFA World Cup. On 6 June 2026, he debuted and scored his first goal for the Japan national under-19 football team during a 3–1 away friendly win over the Mexico national under-20 football team.

== Style of play ==
Yamamoto plays as a midfielder and is left-footed. Japanese news website footballista wrote in 2026 "while his left-footed playmaker status often overshadows it, his physical strength, stemming from his 177cm, 72kg frame, is also a major asset".
