= Ryō Hatsuse =

Japanese footballer (born 1997)

Ryo Hatsuse 初瀬 亮
Personal information
- Date of birth: 10 July 1997 (age 29)
- Place of birth: Kishiwada, Osaka, Japan
- Height: 1.80 m (5 ft 11 in)
- Position: Left back

Team information
- Current team: Gamba Osaka
- Number: 21

Youth career
- 2006–2009: Andrews FC
- 2010–2015: Gamba Osaka

Senior career*
Years	Team	Apps	(Gls)
2016–2018	Gamba Osaka	34	(0)
2016–2018	Gamba Osaka U-23	25	(0)
2019–2025	Vissel Kobe	151	(2)
2019	→ Avispa Fukuoka (loan)	9	(0)
2025	Sheffield Wednesday	6	(0)
2025–	Gamba Osaka	19	(0)

International career
2017	Japan U20	2	(0)
Medal record
Representing Japan
Asian Games
Silver medal – second place	2018 Jakarta-Palembang	Team
AFC U-19 Championship
Gold medal – first place	2016 Bahrain
Signature
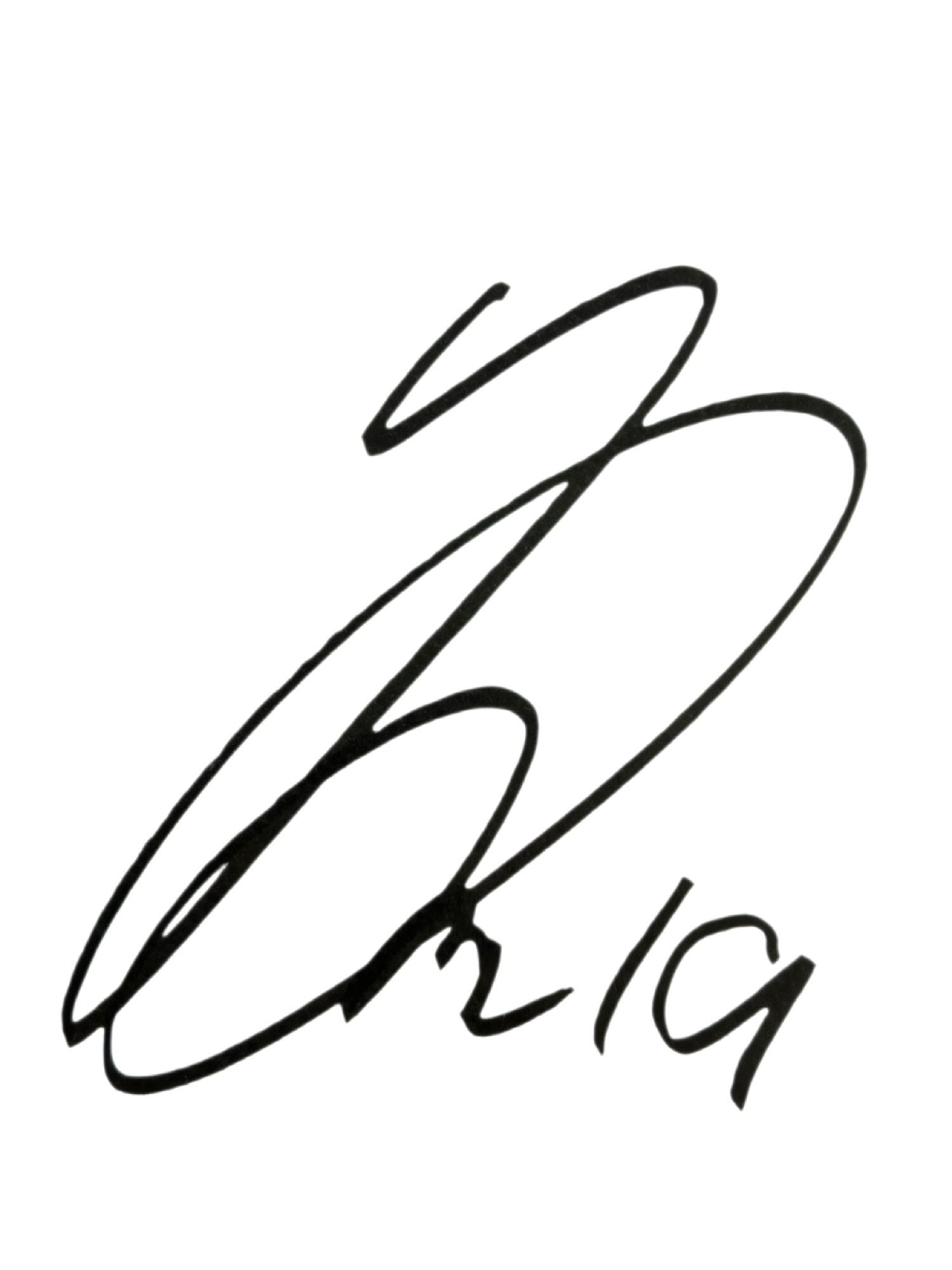
- * Club domestic league appearances and goals as of 07:59, 10 May 2026 (UTC)

Ryo Hatsuse (初瀬 亮, Hatsuse Ryō; born 10 July 1997) is a Japanese professional footballer who plays as a left back for Gamba Osaka.

== Club career ==
=== Gamba Osaka ===
Hatsuse was part of the Gamba Osaka team as a type 2 player, and made his debut for the club in a Panasonic Cup match against Nagoya Grampus. He made his J1 league debut against Ventforet Kofu on 6 March 2016. Hatsuse scored his first goal for the club in the Emperor's Cup against Verspah Oita on 22 June 2017. He assisted Shun Nagasawa's goal against Vegalta Sendai on 29 October 2017, making it his fourth assist in four consecutive league matches.

=== Vissel Kobe ===
On 17 December 2018, Hatsuse joined Vissel Kobe. He scored his first goal for the club on 1 February 2019 in a pre season friendly against Los Angeles FC, scoring a direct free kick in the 81st minute. During the 2023 season, he would play 33 times in the league, as Vissel Kobe would go on to win the 2023 J1 League.

During the 2024 season, he would play 25 times in the league, as Vissel Kobe would go on to win the 2024 J1 League.

==== Loan to Avispa Fukuoka ====
On 5 September 2019, Hatsuse joined Avispa Fukuoka on loan.

=== Sheffield Wednesday ===
On 6 February 2025, Hatsuse joined EFL Championship side Sheffield Wednesday on a free transfer. He made his debut in a 4–0 defeat to Burnley coming off the bench on 21 February 2025. He was released from his contract following the end of the 2024–25 season.

=== Return to Gamba Osaka ===
On 13 August 2025, Hatsuse rejoined Gamba Osaka.

== International career ==
In May 2017, Hatsuse was called up to the Japan under-20 national team for 2017 U-20 World Cup. At this tournament, he played two matches as a right-back. He was called up to the senior team as part of their squad at the 2017 EAFF E-1 Football Championship.

== Club statistics ==
As of 10 May 2026

Appearances and goals by club, season and competition
Club	Season	League			National cup (Note: Includes Emperors Cup)		League cup (Note: Includes J. League Cup)		Continental		Other		Total	
Club	Season	Division	Apps	Goals	Apps	Goals	Apps	Goals	Apps	Goals	Apps	Goals	Apps	Goals
Gamba Osaka	2016	J1 League	5	0	2	0	0	0	1	0	0	0	8	0
Gamba Osaka	2017	J1 League	19	0	3	1	2	0	4	0	—		28	1
Gamba Osaka	2018	J1 League	10	0	0	0	5	0	—		—		15	0
Gamba Osaka	Total		34	0	5	1	7	0	5	0	0	0	51	1
Gamba Osaka U-23	2016	J3 League	15	0	—		—		—		—		15	0
Gamba Osaka U-23	2018	J3 League	10	0	—		—		—		—		10	0
Gamba Osaka U-23	Total		25	0	0	0	0	0	0	0	0	0	25	0
Vissel Kobe	2019	J1 League	17	0	0	0	1	0	—		—		18	0
Vissel Kobe	2020	J1 League	16	0	—		1	0	4	0	0	0	21	0
Vissel Kobe	2021	J1 League	33	0	3	0	8	0	—		—		44	0
Vissel Kobe	2022	J1 League	17	1	4	2	2	0	4	0	—		27	3
Vissel Kobe	2023	J1 League	33	1	4	0	2	0	—		—		39	1
Vissel Kobe	2024	J1 League	35	0	4	0	2	0	5	0	1 (Note: Appearance in Japanese Super Cup)	0	47	0
Vissel Kobe	Total		151	2	15	2	16	0	13	0	1	0	196	4
Avispa Fukuoka (loan)	2019	J2 League	9	0	—		—		—		—		9	0
Sheffield Wednesday	2024–25	EFL Championship	6	0	0	0	0	0	—		—		6	0
Gamba Osaka	2025	J1 League	5	0	0	0	0	0	1	0	0	0	6	0
Gamba Osaka	2026	J1 100 Year Vision League	13	0	0	0	0	0	5	0	0	0	18	0
Gamba Osaka	Total		19	0	0	0	0	0	6	0	0	0	25	0
Career Total			244	2	20	3	23	0	24	0	1	0	312	5

== Honours ==
Gamba Osaka

- Emperor's Cup: 2015
- AFC Champions League Two: 2025–26

Vissel Kobe

- J1 League: 2023, 2024
- Emperor's Cup: 2024
