= 2025–26 AFC Champions League Two knockout stage =

Knockout stage of Asia's secondary club football tournament

The knockout stage of the 2025–26 AFC Champions League Two was played from 10 February to 16 May 2026. A total of 16 teams competed in the knockout stage.

== Qualified teams ==
The following teams advanced from the group stage.

Region	Group	Winners	Runners-up
West Region	A	(United Arab Emirates) Al Wasl	(Iran) Esteghlal
West Region	B	(Qatar) Al Ahli	(Turkmenistan) Arkadag
West Region	C	(Jordan) Al-Hussein	(Iran) Sepahan
West Region	D	(Saudi Arabia) Al-Nassr	(Iraq) Al-Zawraa
East Region	E	(Australia) Macarthur	(Vietnam) Công An Hà Nội
East Region	F	(Japan) Gamba Osaka	(Thailand) Ratchaburi
East Region	G	(Indonesia) Persib Bandung	(Thailand) Bangkok United
East Region	H	(Singapore) Tampines Rovers	(South Korea) Pohang Steelers

== Format ==
In the knockout stage, 16 teams played a single-elimination tournament, split by Region. Each tie was played on a home-and-away two-legged basis, except the final which was played as a single match. Extra time and penalty shoot-out would be used to decide the winners if necessary (Regulations Article 10). The order of matches (home vs away) was determined at the draw, except for the final, which was pre-determined on a rotation basis, with the match to be hosted by the team from the West Region. The draw for the knockout stage was held on 30 December 2025.

== Schedule ==
The quarter-finals for the West Region were initially postponed due to the impacts from the 2026 Iran war. On 24 March 2026, the AFC announced that the West Region quarter-finals and semi-finals would take place at a centralised venue at Zabeel Stadium, Dubai.

The schedule of the competition is as follows.

Stage	Round	Draw date	West Region		East Region	
Stage	Round	Draw date	First Leg	Second leg	First Leg	Second leg
Knockout stage	Round of 16	30 December 2025	10–11 February 2026	17–18 February 2026	11–12 February 2026	18–19 February 2026
Knockout stage	Quarter-finals	30 December 2025	19 April 2026		4 March 2026	11 March 2026
Knockout stage	Semi-finals	30 December 2025	22 April 2026		8 April 2026	15 April 2026
Knockout stage	Final	30 December 2025	16 May 2026			

== Bracket ==
Round of 16
(Iraq) Al-Zawraa	3	2	5
(United Arab Emirates) Al Wasl (a.e.t.)	2	4	6
(Turkmenistan) Arkadag	0	0	0
(Saudi Arabia) Al-Nassr	1	1	2
West Region
(Iran) Sepahan	2	0	2
(Qatar) Al Ahli (a.e.t.)	2	1	3
(Iran) Esteghlal	0	2	2
(Jordan) Al-Hussein	1	3	4
(South Korea) Pohang Steelers	1	1	2
(Japan) Gamba Osaka	1	2	3
(Thailand) Ratchaburi	3	0	3
(Indonesia) Persib	0	1	1
East Region
(Thailand) Bangkok United	2	2	4
(Australia) Macarthur FC	0	2	2
(Vietnam) Công An Hà Nội	0	1	1
(Singapore) Tampines Rovers	3	3	6

Quarter-finals
(United Arab Emirates) Al Wasl	0
(Saudi Arabia) Al-Nassr	4
(Qatar) Al Ahli	3
(Jordan) Al-Hussein	1
(Japan) Gamba Osaka (a.e.t.)	1	2	3
(Thailand) Ratchaburi	1	1	2
(Thailand) Bangkok United	2	2	4
(Singapore) Tampines Rovers	1	2	3

Semi-finals
(Saudi Arabia) Al-Nassr	5
(Qatar) Al Ahli	1
(Japan) Gamba Osaka	0	3	3
(Thailand) Bangkok United	1	0	1

Final
16 May – Riyadh
(Saudi Arabia) Al-Nassr	0
(Japan) Gamba Osaka	1

== Round of 16 ==
=== Summary ===
The first legs were played on 10 and 12 February, and the second legs were played on 17 and 19 February 2026.

Team 1	Agg.	Team 2	1st leg	2nd leg
West Region
Al-Zawraa (Iraq)	5–6	(United Arab Emirates) Al Wasl	3–2	2–4 (a.e.t.)
Arkadag (Turkmenistan)	0–2	(Saudi Arabia) Al-Nassr	0–1	0–1
Sepahan (Iran)	2–3	(Qatar) Al Ahli	2–2	0–1 (a.e.t.)
Esteghlal (Iran)	2–4	(Jordan) Al-Hussein	0–1	2–3
East Region
Pohang Steelers (South Korea)	2–3	(Japan) Gamba Osaka	1–1	1–2
Ratchaburi (Thailand)	3–1	(Indonesia) Persib	3–0	0–1
Bangkok United (Thailand)	4–2	(Australia) Macarthur FC	2–0	2–2
Công An Hà Nội (Vietnam)	1–6	(Singapore) Tampines Rovers	0–3 (Note: Tampines Rovers were awarded a 3–0 victory by forfeit, after Công An Hà Nội fielded two ineligible players, Stefan Mauk and Rogério Alves. The score on the field was originally a 4–0 win by Công An Hà Nội.)	1–3

==== West Region ====
10 February 2026
19:00 UTC+3

Al-Zawraa (Iraq)	3–2	(United Arab Emirates) Al Wasl
Jamous 45+7'; Riascos 68', 76'	Report	Borja 5', 65'

Al-Zawraa Stadium, Baghdad
Attendance: 13,000
Referee: Nasrullo Kabirov (Tajikistan)
17 February 2026
20:00 UTC+4

Al Wasl (United Arab Emirates)	4–2 (a.e.t.)	(Iraq) Al-Zawraa
Palacios 46'; Borja 76'; Adryelson 90+3', 109'	Report	Gbadamosi 21', 65'

Zabeel Stadium, Dubai
Attendance: 3,602
Referee: Alex King (Australia)

Al Wasl won 6–5 on aggregate.

10 February 2026
17:45 UTC+4

Esteghlal (Iran)	0–1	(Jordan) Al-Hussein
	Report	Abu Jalboush 78'

Al Maktoum Stadium, Dubai (United Arab Emirates) (Note: Esteghlal were required to play their home matches at neutral venues instead of their regular home stadium, Azadi Stadium, Tehran, due to security concerns relating to the 2026 Iran massacres.)
Attendance: 1,695
Referee: Qasim Al-Hatmi (Oman)
17 February 2026
21:15 UTC+3

Al-Hussein (Jordan)	3–2	(Iran) Esteghlal
Hajabi 40'; Abu Al-Jazar 76'; Al-Namarneh 90+5'	Report	Asani 10', 49'

Amman International Stadium, Amman (Note: Al-Hussein played their home matches at Amman International Stadium, Amman, instead of their regular home stadium Al-Hassan Stadium, Irbid, which did not meet AFC requirements.)
Attendance: 2,590
Referee: Rustam Lutfullin (Uzbekistan)

Al-Hussein won 4–2 on aggregate.

11 February 2026
18:45 UTC+5

Arkadag (Turkmenistan)	0–1	(Saudi Arabia) Al-Nassr
	Report	Al-Hamdan 19'

Ashgabat Olympic Stadium, Ashgabat
Attendance: 45,000
Referee: Ammar Mahfoodh (Bahrain)
18 February 2026
21:15 UTC+3

Al-Nassr (Saudi Arabia)	1–0	(Turkmenistan) Arkadag
Ghareeb 2'	Report

Al-Awwal Park, Riyadh
Attendance: 3,631
Referee: Payam Heydari (Iran)

Al-Nassr won 2–0 on aggregate.

11 February 2026
19:00 UTC+3

Sepahan (Iran)	2–2	(Qatar) Al Ahli
R. Alves 20'; Rezavand 45+7'	Report	Vlap 28'; Expósito 90+3'

Al Thumama Stadium, Doha (Qatar) (Note: Sepahan were required to play their home matches at neutral venues instead of their regular home stadium, Naghsh-e Jahan Stadium, Isfahan, due to security concerns relating to the 2026 Iran massacres.)
Attendance: 337
Referee: Ko Hyung-jin (South Korea)
18 February 2026
21:15 UTC+3

Al Ahli (Qatar)	1–0 (a.e.t.)	(Iran) Sepahan
S. Yansané 91'	Report

Al Thumama Stadium, Doha
Attendance: 1,339
Referee: Ryo Tanimoto (Japan)

Al Ahli won 3–2 on aggregate.

==== East Region ====
11 February 2026
19:15 UTC+7

Ratchaburi (Thailand)	3–0	(Indonesia) Persib
Tana 5', 84'; Mutombo 53'	Report

Dragon Solar Park, Ratchaburi
Attendance: 5,844
Referee: Ahmed Eisa Darwish (United Arab Emirates)
18 February 2026
19:15 UTC+7

Persib (Indonesia)	1–0	(Thailand) Ratchaburi
Jung 40'	Report

Gelora Bandung Lautan Api Stadium, Bandung
Attendance: 26,406
Referee: Majed Al-Shamrani (Saudi Arabia)

Ratchaburi won 3–1 on aggregate.

11 February 2026
19:15 UTC+7

Công An Hà Nội (Vietnam)	0–3 Awarded	(Singapore) Tampines Rovers
Nguyễn Quang Hải 24', 27'; China 37'; Nguyễn Đình Bắc 90+2'	Report

Hàng Đẫy Stadium, Hanoi
Attendance: 3,186
Referee: Zaid Thamer Mohammed (Iraq)
18 February 2026
20:15 UTC+8

Tampines Rovers (Singapore)	3–1	(Vietnam) Công An Hà Nội
Higashikawa 36', 60'; Buhagiar 79'	Report	Alan 77' (pen.)

Jalan Besar Stadium, Singapore
Attendance: 1,701
Referee: Kim Yu-jeong (South Korea)

Tampines Rovers won 6–1 on aggregate.

12 February 2026
19:15 UTC+7

Bangkok United (Thailand)	2–0	(Australia) Macarthur FC
Alhaft 37'; Arthur 72'	Report

Pathum Thani Stadium, Pathum Thani
Attendance: 1,092
Referee: Shen Yinhao (China)
19 February 2026
18:45 UTC+11

Macarthur FC (Australia)	2–2	(Thailand) Bangkok United
Scott 41'; Sawyer 90+2'	Report	Al-Ghassani 2', 33'

Campbelltown Sports Stadium, Sydney
Attendance: 1,666
Referee: Meder Tayçiev (Kyrgyzstan)

Bangkok United won 4–2 on aggregate.

12 February 2026
19:00 UTC+9

Pohang Steelers (South Korea)	1–1	(Japan) Gamba Osaka
J. Teixeira 70'	Report	R. Yamashita 47'

Pohang Steel Yard, Pohang
Attendance: 4,589
Referee: Ahmad A'Qashah (Singapore)
19 February 2026
19:00 UTC+9

Gamba Osaka (Japan)	2–1	(South Korea) Pohang Steelers
Hümmet 34'; R. Yamashita 41'	Report	Nishiya 61'

Suita City Football Stadium, Suita
Attendance: 9,456
Referee: Casey Reibelt (Australia)

Gamba Osaka won 3–2 on aggregate.

== Quarter-finals ==
=== Summary ===
The West Region quarter-finals fixtures were originally scheduled to take place between 3 and 10 March, but were postponed by the AFC due to impacts from the 2026 Iran war. The quarter-finals for the West Region were rescheduled to take place on 19 April, as single-legged ties.

The first legs for the East Region were played on 4 and 5 March, with the second legs played on 11 and 12 March.

Team 1	Score	Team 2
West Region
Al Wasl (United Arab Emirates)	0–4	(Saudi Arabia) Al-Nassr
Al Ahli (Qatar)	3–1	(Jordan) Al-Hussein

Team 1	Agg.	Team 2	1st leg	2nd leg
East Region
Gamba Osaka (Japan)	3–2	(Thailand) Ratchaburi	1–1	2–1 (a.e.t.)
Bangkok United (Thailand)	4–3	(Singapore) Tampines Rovers	2–1	2–2

==== West Region ====
19 April 2026
18:00 UTC+4

Al Wasl (United Arab Emirates)	0–4	(Saudi Arabia) Al-Nassr
	Report	Ronaldo 11'; Martínez 24'; Al-Amri 26'; Mané 80'

Zabeel Stadium, Dubai (Note: Due to the impacts from the 2026 Iran war, the AFC decided to play a one-legged tie.)
Attendance: 7,030
Referee: Rustam Lutfullin (Uzbekistan)

19 April 2026
23:00 UTC+4

Al Ahli (Qatar)	3–1	(Jordan) Al-Hussein
Expósito 2'; Draxler 65'; Vlap 90+7' (pen.)	Report	Qashi 21'

Zabeel Stadium, Dubai
Attendance: 650
Referee: Sadullo Gulmurodi (Tajikistan)

==== East Region ====
4 March 2026
19:00 UTC+9

Gamba Osaka (Japan)	1–1	(Thailand) Ratchaburi
Nawata 84'	Report	Ting 18'

Suita City Football Stadium, Suita
Attendance: 7,024
Referee: Alex King (Australia)
11 March 2026
19:15 UTC+7

Ratchaburi (Thailand)	1–2 (a.e.t.)	(Japan) Gamba Osaka
Gleyson 50'	Report	Miura 29'; Welton 99'

Dragon Solar Park, Ratchaburi
Attendance: 9,862
Referee: Ko Hyung-jin (South Korea)

Gamba Osaka won 3–2 on aggregate.

5 March 2026
19:15 UTC+7

Bangkok United (Thailand)	2–1	(Singapore) Tampines Rovers
Kosović 11'; Picha 18'	Report	Buhagiar 80'

Pathum Thani Stadium, Pathum Thani
Attendance: 1,153
Referee: Ryo Tanimoto (Japan)
12 March 2026
20:15 UTC+8

Tampines Rovers (Singapore)	2–2	(Thailand) Bangkok United
Buhagiar 39'; Kazama 71'	Report	Teerasil 15'; Alhaft 42'

Jalan Besar Stadium, Singapore
Attendance: 1,350
Referee: Wang Di (China)

Bangkok United won 4–3 on aggregate.

== Semi-finals ==
=== Summary ===
The East Region first leg was played on 8 April, and the second leg was played on 15 April. The semi-final for the West Region was played on 22 April.

Team 1	Score	Team 2
West Region
Al-Nassr (Saudi Arabia)	5–1	(Qatar) Al Ahli

Team 1	Agg.	Team 2	1st leg	2nd leg
East Region
Gamba Osaka (Japan)	3–1	(Thailand) Bangkok United	0–1	3–0

==== West Region ====
22 April 2026
20:00 UTC+4

Al-Nassr (Saudi Arabia)	5–1	(Qatar) Al Ahli
Coman 12', 45+8', 63'; Ângelo 23'; Al-Hamdan 80'	Report	Yansané 10'

Zabeel Stadium, Dubai
Attendance: 5,955
Referee: Choi Hyun-jai (South Korea)

==== East Region ====
8 April 2026
19:00 UTC+9

Gamba Osaka (Japan)	0–1	(Thailand) Bangkok United
	Report	Al-Ghassani 15' (pen.)

Suita City Football Stadium, Suita
Attendance: 12,150
Referee: Nazmi Nasaruddin (Malaysia)
15 April 2026
19:15 UTC+7

Bangkok United (Thailand)	0–3	(Japan) Gamba Osaka
	Report	R. Yamashita 19'; Jebali 39'; Meshino 82'

Rajamangala Stadium, Bangkok (Note: Bangkok United were required to play their home matches at Rajamangala Stadium, Bangkok, as their regular home stadium—Pathum Thani Stadium, Pathum Thani—was hosting the 2026 AFC U-20 Women's Asian Cup.)
Attendance: 13,310
Referee: Kim Jong-hyeok (South Korea)

Gamba Osaka won 3–1 on aggregate.

== Final ==
16 May 2026
20:45 UTC+3

Al-Nassr (Saudi Arabia)	0–1	(Japan) Gamba Osaka
	Report	Hümmet 30'

King Saud University Stadium, Riyadh
Attendance: 25,207
Referee: Abdullah Jamali (Kuwait)

== See also ==
- 2025–26 AFC Champions League Elite knockout stage
- 2025–26 AFC Challenge League knockout stage
