= Kanji Okunuki =

Japanese footballer (born 1999)

Kanji Okunuki 奥抜 侃志
Personal information
- Full name: Kanji Okunuki
- Date of birth: 11 August 1999 (age 27)
- Place of birth: Tochigi, Japan
- Height: 1.71 m (5 ft 7 in)
- Position: Winger

Team information
- Current team: Gamba Osaka
- Number: 44

Youth career
- Fanaticos
- –2017: Omiya Ardija

Senior career*
Years	Team	Apps	(Gls)
2018–2023	Omiya Ardija	91	(14)
2022–2023	→ Górnik Zabrze (loan)	26	(4)
2023–2025	1. FC Nürnberg	35	(4)
2025–	Gamba Osaka	26	(2)

International career^{‡}
2024–	Japan	1	(0)
- * Club domestic league appearances and goals as of 9 August 2026 ‡ National team caps and goals as of 1 January 2024

Kanji Okunuki (奥抜 侃志, Okunuki Kanji; born 11 August 1999) is a Japanese professional footballer who plays as an attacking midfielder for J1 League club Gamba Osaka.

== Career ==
Okunuki was born in Ina, Saitama. After raising through Omiya Ardija youth ranks, he signed for the top team in January 2018.

On 31 August 2022, he left Omiya to join Ekstraklasa side Górnik Zabrze on a season-long loan, with the Polish club keeping an option to make the move permanent.

On 30 June 2023, 1. FC Nürnberg from German 2. Bundesliga announced the signing of Okunuki.

On 6 January 2025, Okunuki returned to Japan and signed with J1 League club Gamba Osaka for the 2025 season.

== International career ==
On 9 October 2023, Okunuki was called up for the Japan senior national team for the friendly matches against Canada and Tunisia on 13 October and 17 October 2023.

He made his debut on 1 January 2024 in a friendly against Thailand.

== Career statistics ==
As of match played 21 September 2024.

Appearances and goals by club, season and competition
Club	Season	League			National cup (Note: Includes Emperor's Cup, Polish Cup, DFB-Pokal)		League cup		Other		Total	
Club	Season	Division	Apps	Goals	Apps	Goals	Apps	Goals	Apps	Goals	Apps	Goals
Omiya Ardija	2018	J2 League	7	0	0	0	—		1 (Note: Includes J1 League promotion play-offs)	0	8	0
Omiya Ardija	2019	J2 League	25	5	1	0	—		1	0	27	5
Omiya Ardija	2020	J2 League	23	5	0	0	—		—		23	5
Omiya Ardija	2021	J2 League	17	3	0	0	—		—		17	3
Omiya Ardija	2022	J2 League	19	1	2	0	—		—		21	1
Omiya Ardija	Total		91	14	3	0	0	0	2	0	96	14
Gornik Zabrze (loan)	2022–23	Ekstraklasa	26	4	2	0	—		—		28	4
1. FC Nürnberg	2023–24	2. Bundesliga	30	3	3	1	—		—		33	4
1. FC Nürnberg	2024–25	2. Bundesliga	5	1	1	0	—		—		6	1
1. FC Nürnberg	Total		35	4	4	1	0	0	0	0	39	5
Gamba Osaka	2025	J1 League	0	0	0	0	0	0	0	0	0	0
Career total			152	22	9	1	0	0	2	0	163	23

== Honours ==
Gamba Osaka

- AFC Champions League Two: 2025–26
