= Shuto Abe =

Japanese footballer

Shuto Abe 安部 柊斗
Personal information
- Date of birth: 5 December 1997 (age 28)
- Place of birth: Tokyo, Japan
- Height: 1.71 m (5 ft 7 in)
- Position: Defensive midfielder

Team information
- Current team: Gamba Osaka
- Number: 13

Youth career
- 2004–2010: Sugino Hyakuso SS
- 2010–2015: FC Tokyo

College career
Years	Team	Apps	(Gls)
2016–2019	Meiji University		

Senior career*
Years	Team	Apps	(Gls)
2019	FC Tokyo U-23	4	(0)
2019–2023	FC Tokyo	137	(12)
2023–2025	RWD Molenbeek	64	(5)
2025–	Gamba Osaka	30	(2)
- * Club domestic league appearances and goals as of 9 August 2026

Shuto Abe (安部 柊斗, Abe Shūto; born 5 December 1997) is a Japanese footballer who plays as a defensive midfielder for J1 League club Gamba Osaka.

== Early life ==
Shuto was born in Tokyo. He played for Sugino Hyakuso SS, FC Tokyo and Meiji University in his youth.

== Career ==
Shuto made his debut for Tokyo U-23s against Nagano Parceiro on the 8th of June 2019.

Shuto made his debut for Tokyo against Vissel Kobe on the 15 June 2019. He scored his first goal for the club on the 19th of August 2020, scoring in the 22nd minute against Sanfrecce Hiroshima.

Shuto made his debut for Molenbeek against OH Leuven on the 5th of August 2023. He scored his first goal for the club against K.A.S. Eupen, scoring in the 66th minute on the 11th of November 2023.

== Career statistics ==
=== Club ===
As of 26 July 2023.

Club	Season	League			National Cup (Note: Includes appearances in the Emperor's Cup)		League Cup (Note: Includes appearances in the J. League Cup)		Continental (Note: Includes appearances in the AFC Champions League)		Other		Total	
Club	Season	Division	Apps	Goals	Apps	Goals	Apps	Goals	Apps	Goals	Apps	Goals	Apps	Goals
Meiji University	2019	–			2	0	–		–		–		2	0
FC Tokyo U-23	2019	J3 League	4	0	–		–		–		–		4	0
FC Tokyo	2019	J1 League	1	0	0	0	1	0	–		–		2	0
FC Tokyo	2020	J1 League	27	2	–		3	2	8	1	–		38	5
FC Tokyo	2021	J1 League	36	0	0	0	8	0	–		–		44	0
FC Tokyo	2022	J1 League	30	4	2	0	2	1	–		–		34	5
FC Tokyo	2023	J1 League	16	2	1	0	2	0	–		–		19	2
FC Tokyo	Total		110	8	3	0	16	3	8	1	0	0	137	12
RWD Molenbeek	2023–23	Belgian Pro League	19	1	2	0	–		–		–		21	1
Career total			133	9	7	0	16	3	8	1	0	0	164	13

== Honours ==
=== Club ===
FC Tokyo

- J.League Cup: 2020

Gamba Osaka

- AFC Champions League Two: 2025–26
