= Shinnosuke Nakatani =

Japanese footballer (born 1996)

Shinnosuke Nakatani 中谷 進之介
Personal information
- Full name: Shinnosuke Nakatani
- Date of birth: 24 March 1996 (age 30)
- Place of birth: Sakura, Chiba, Japan
- Height: 1.82 m (6 ft 0 in)
- Position: Centre back

Team information
- Current team: Gamba Osaka
- Number: 20

Youth career
- 2005–2013: Kashiwa Reysol

Senior career*
Years	Team	Apps	(Gls)
2014–2018	Kashiwa Reysol	76	(2)
2014	→ J. League U-22 (loan)	6	(0)
2015	→ J. League U-22 (loan)	7	(0)
2018–2023	Nagoya Grampus	188	(6)
2024–	Gamba Osaka	93	(7)

International career^{‡}
2012	Japan U16	1	(0)
2016	Japan U23	1	(0)
2021–	Japan	5	(0)
Medal record
Men's football
Representing Japan
EAFF Championship
Winner	2022 Japan
AFC U-16 Championship
Runner-up	2012 Iran
- * Club domestic league appearances and goals as of 9 August 2026 ‡ National team caps and goals as of 30 November 2023

Shinnosuke Nakatani (中谷 進之介, Nakatani Shinnosuke; born 24 March 1996) is a Japanese professional footballer who plays as a centre back for Gamba Osaka.

== Club career ==
On 12 July 2023, Nakatani was registered as a type-2 player with the Kashiwa Reysol first team. On 8 December 2013, Nakatani was promoted to the first team from the 2014 season. He made his official debut for Kashiwa Reysol in the J. League Division 1, on 22 October 2014 against Gamba Osaka in Kashiwa Hitachi Stadium in Kashiwa, Japan. He started and played the full match. Nakatani and his club lost the match 1–0.

After five years as a pro in Kashiwa, Nakatani switched mid-season to Nagoya Grampus in June 2018. During the 2020 season, he formed a solid defensive partnership with Yuichi Maruyama and Mitchell Langerak. At the end of the 2020 season, Nagoya Grampus conceded the lowest goals in the league with 28, and qualified for the AFC Champions League Elite for the first time since 2011.

On 21 December 2023, Nakatani was announced at Gamba Osaka on a permanent transfer. During the 2024 season, Nakatani was the only outfield player to play 38 games and the full 3,420 minutes in league matches. Last season, Gamba Osaka had conceded 61 goals, during the 2024 season, they only conceded 35 goals, the second fewest in the league. At the end of the 2024 season, he was named in the 2024 J.League Best XI.

== International career ==
Nakatani was not called up to the Japan U23 team for the 2016 Summer Olympics, but travelled as a backup player with the squad.

Nakatani made his debut for Japan national team on 30 March 2021 in a World Cup qualifier against Mongolia.

== Club career statistics ==
As of 30 November 2023.

Club	Season	League	League		Cup		League Cup		Continental		Total	
Club	Season	League	Apps	Goals	Apps	Goals	Apps	Goals	Apps	Goals	Apps	Goals
Kashiwa Reysol	2014	J1 League	5	0	0	0	0	0	—		5	0
Kashiwa Reysol	2015	J1 League	3	0	2	0	0	0	5	0	10	0
Kashiwa Reysol	2016	J1 League	31	2	3	0	3	0	—		37	2
Kashiwa Reysol	2017	J1 League	30	0	3	0	2	0	—		35	0
Kashiwa Reysol	2018	J1 League	7	0	0	0	—		7	0	14	0
Kashiwa Reysol	Total		76	2	8	0	5	0	12	0	101	2
J. League U-22 (loan)	2014	J3 League	6	0	—		—		—		6	0
J. League U-22 (loan)	2015	J3 League	7	0	—		—		—		7	0
J. League U-22 (loan)	Total		13	0	—		—		—		13	0
Nagoya Grampus	2018	J1 League	17	0	1	0	0	0	—		18	0
Nagoya Grampus	2019	J1 League	34	1	0	0	5	0	—		39	1
Nagoya Grampus	2020	J1 League	34	0	—		4	0	—		38	0
Nagoya Grampus	2021	J1 League	37	2	3	1	5	0	8	1	53	4
Nagoya Grampus	2022	J1 League	33	2	2	0	8	0	—		43	2
Nagoya Grampus	2023	J1 League	33	1	3	0	8	0	—		44	1
Nagoya Grampus	Total		188	6	9	1	30	0	8	1	235	8
Career total			277	8	17	1	35	0	20	1	349	10

== Honours ==
Gamba Osaka

- AFC Champions League Two: 2025–26

Nagoya Grampus

- J.League Cup: 2021

Japan

- EAFF Championship: 2022

Individual

- J.League Best XI: 2024
