= Harumi Minamino =

Japanese association football player

Harumi Minamino 南野 遥海
Personal information
- Full name: Harumi Minamino
- Date of birth: 13 May 2004 (age 22)
- Place of birth: Hyōgo, Japan
- Height: 1.74 m (5 ft 9 in)
- Position: Forward

Team information
- Current team: Urawa Red Diamonds
- Number: 42

Youth career
- Wings SS Narashino
- Cerezo Osaka
- –2022: Gamba Osaka

Senior career*
| Years | Team | Apps | (Gls) |
| 2022–2026 | Gamba Osaka | 31 | (7) |
| 2023 | → Tegevajaro Miyazaki (loan) | 38 | (10) |
| 2024 | Tochigi SC (loan) | 35 | (7) |
| 2026– | Urawa Red Diamonds | 1 | (1) |

International career
| 2019 | Japan U16 | 4 | (0) |
- * Club domestic league appearances and goals as of 10 August 2026

Harumi Minamino (南野 遥海, Minamino Harumi; born 13 May 2004) is a Japanese footballer who plays as a forward for Urawa Red Diamonds.

== Club career ==
Minamino made his professional debut for Gamba in a 1–0 J1 League match against Kashiwa Reysol.

On 13 January 2023, Minamino signed for J3 club Tegevajaro Miyazaki for the 2023 season on a training-type loan transfer. He made his league debut for Tegevajaro against Nagano Parceiro on the 5 March 2023. He scored his first goal for the club against Fukushima United on the 19 March 2023, scoring in the 74th minute.

== Career statistics ==
=== Club ===
As of the start from 2023 season.

| Club | Season | League | | | National Cup | | League Cup | | Other | | Total | |
| Club | Season | Division | Apps | Goals | Apps | Goals | Apps | Goals | Apps | Goals | Apps | Goals |
|---|---|---|---|---|---|---|---|---|---|---|---|---|
| Gamba Osaka | 2022 | J1 League | 2 | 0 | 1 (Note: Appearances in the Emperor's Cup) | 0 | 1 (Note: Appearances in the J.League Cup) | 0 | 0 | 0 | 4 | 0 |
| Tegevajaro Miyazaki (loan) | 2023 | J3 League | 0 | 0 | 0 | 0 | 0 | 0 | 0 | 0 | 0 | 0 |
| Career total | | | 2 | 0 | 1 | 0 | 1 | 0 | 0 | 0 | 4 | 0 |

== Honours ==
Gamba Osaka

- AFC Champions League Two: 2025–26
