= Shogo Sasaki =

Japanese footballer

Shogo Sasaki 佐々木 翔悟
Personal information
- Full name: Shogo Sasaki
- Date of birth: 25 July 2000 (age 26)
- Place of birth: Ibaraki, Japan
- Height: 1.83 m (6 ft 0 in)
- Position: Defender

Team information
- Current team: Gamba Osaka
- Number: 67

Youth career
- Moriya Kuwagata
- –2018: Kashima Antlers

Senior career*
Years	Team	Apps	(Gls)
2019–2021	Kashima Antlers	0	(0)
2020–2021	→ Iwate Grulla Morioka (loan)	25	(0)
2022–2024	JEF United Chiba	65	(3)
2025–	Gamba Osaka	16	(1)
- * Club domestic league appearances and goals as of 15:11, 12 October 2026 (UTC)

Shogo Sasaki (佐々木 翔悟, Sasaki Shogo; born 25 July 2000) is a Japanese footballer currently playing as a left-back for J1 League club Gamba Osaka.

== Career statistics ==
=== Club ===
As of 12 October 2026.

Appearances and goals by club, season and competition
Club	Season	League			National cup (Note: Includes Emperor's Cup)		League cup (Note: Includes J.League Cup)		Continental		Other		Total	
Club	Season	Division	Apps	Goals	Apps	Goals	Apps	Goals	Apps	Goals	Apps	Goals	Apps	Goals
Kashima Antlers	2019	J1 League	0	0	0	0	0	0	0	0	–		0	0
Kashima Antlers	2020	J1 League	0	0	0	0	0	0	0	0	–		0	0
Kashima Antlers	Total		0	0	0	0	0	0	0	0	0	0	0	0
Iwate Grulla Morioka (loan)	2020	J3 League	8	0	0	0	–		–		–		8	0
Iwate Grulla Morioka (loan)	2021	J3 League	17	0	2	0	–		–		–		19	0
Iwate Grulla Morioka (loan)	Total		25	0	2	0	0	0	0	0	0	0	27	0
JEF United Chiba	2022	J2 League	14	0	1	0	0	0	–		0	0	15	0
JEF United Chiba	2023	J2 League	21	1	1	0	0	0	–		1 (Note: Appearance in J1/J2 play-offs)	0	23	1
JEF United Chiba	2024	J2 League	29	2	3	0	0	0	–		0	0	32	2
JEF United Chiba	Total		64	3	5	0	0	0	0	0	1	0	70	3
Gamba Osaka	2025	J1 League	7	0	1	1	2	0	3 (Note: Appearances in AFC Champions League Two)	0	–		13	1
Gamba Osaka	2026	J1 (100)	3	1	–		–		0	0	–		3	1
Gamba Osaka	2026–27	J1 League	6	0	2	0	1	1	1 (Note: Appearances in AFC Champions League Elite)	0	–		10	1
Gamba Osaka	Total		16	1	3	1	3	1	4	0	0	0	26	3
Career total			105	4	10	1	3	1	4	0	1	0	123	6
