= Deniz Hümmet =

Swedish-born Turkish footballer

Personal information
- Full name: Deniz Hümmet
- Date of birth: 13 September 1996 (age 30)
- Place of birth: Fosie, Malmö, Sweden
- Height: 1.89 m (6 ft 2 in)
- Position: Forward

Team information
- Current team: Gamba Osaka
- Number: 23

Youth career
- 2002–2014: Malmö FF

Senior career*
Years	Team	Apps	(Gls)
2014	Malmö FF	0	(0)
2015–2017	Troyes B	38	(15)
2015–2017	Troyes	10	(0)
2017	Gefle IF	28	(12)
2018	Trelleborgs FF	28	(5)
2019–2021	IF Elfsborg	36	(3)
2020–2021	→ Örebro SK (loan)	27	(10)
2021–2023	Çaykur Rizespor	43	(2)
2023	Kalmar FF	30	(9)
2024–2025	Djurgårdens IF	30	(14)
2025–	Gamba Osaka	47	(16)

International career^{‡}
2014	Turkey U18	1	(0)
2015	Turkey U19	3	(1)
2015	Turkey U20	3	(1)
2016–2018	Turkey U21	14	(3)
- * Club domestic league appearances and goals as of 9 August 2026 ‡ National team caps and goals as of 21 April 2019

Deniz Hümmet (born 13 September 1996) is a professional footballer who plays as a forward for J1 League club Gamba Osaka. Born in Sweden, he was a youth international for Turkey.

== Career ==
Hümmet joined Malmö FF when he was six years old. He did not receive an A team contract with the club, and so left to join Troyes. Hümmet made his Ligue 2 debut on 13 February 2015. He made his Ligue 1 debut on 20 February 2016 against AS Monaco.

On 7 March 2017, Hümmet was announced at Gefle IF after a trial period with the club. On 26 January 2018, Hümmet was announced at Trelleborgs FF on a three-year contract. On 17 January 2019, Hümmet was announced at IF Elfsborg, signing a four-year contract.

On 25 August 2020, Hümmet was announced at Örebro SK on loan. He scored a hattrick on his debut for the club, scoring against IFK Norrköping on 30 August 2020. On 18 February 2021, Hümmet signed a second loan deal with Örebro SK, extending through the 2021 season. On 1 September 2021, Hümmet was announced at Çaykur Rizespor on a two-year contract, with the option of a further year.

On 28 March 2023, Hümmet was announced at Kalmar FF, signing a one-year contract that runs through the 2023 season. On 30 January 2024, Hümmet was announced at Djurgårdens IF on a three-year contract. During the 2024 season, he finished third in the list of top goalscorers, with 14 goals scored in 30 league matches.

On 8 March 2025, Hümmet was announced at Gamba Osaka on a permanent transfer. A year later, on 16 May, he netted the only goal in a 1–0 win over Al-Nassr in the AFC Champions League Two final.

== International career ==
Hümmet was called up to the Turkish U21 team, in a friendly game against Germany in Berlin in November 2016.

== Career statistics ==
=== Club ===
As of match played 10 November 2024

Appearances and goals by club, season and competition
Club	Season	League			National cup (Note: Includes Svenska Cupen, Coupe de France, Turkish Cup)		Continental		Other		Total	
Club	Season	Division	Apps	Goals	Apps	Goals	Apps	Goals	Apps	Goals	Apps	Goals
Malmö FF	2014	Allsvenskan	0	0	1	0	0	0	—		1	0
Troyes B	2014-15	CFA	10	2	—		—		—		10	2
Troyes B	2015-16	CFA	17	12	—		—		—		17	12
Troyes B	2016-17	CFA 2	11	1	—		—		—		11	1
Troyes B	Total		38	15	—		—		—		38	15
Troyes	2014-15	Ligue 2	3	0	0	0	—		0	0	3	0
Troyes	2015-16	Ligue 1	6	0	0	0	—		0	0	6	0
Troyes	2016-17	Ligue 2	1	0	1	0	—		1 (Note: Appearance(s) in Coupe de la Ligue)	0	3	0
Troyes	Total		10	0	1	0	—		1	0	12	0
Gefle IF	2017	Superettan	28	12	0	0	—		—		28	12
Trelleborgs FF	2018	Allsvenskan	28	5	4	1	—		—		32	6
IF Elfsborg	2019	Allsvenskan	24	3	4	0	—		—		28	3
IF Elfsborg	2020	Allsvenskan	12	0	4	0	—		—		16	0
IF Elfsborg	Total		36	3	8	0	—		—		44	3
Örebro SK (loan)	2020	Allsvenskan	12	5	1	1	—		—		13	6
Örebro SK (loan)	2021	Allsvenskan	15	5	3	1	—		—		18	6
Örebro SK (loan)	Total		27	10	4	2	—		—		31	12
Çaykur Rizespor	2021-22	Süper Lig	29	1	1	0	—		—		30	1
Çaykur Rizespor	2022-23	TFF First League	14	1	4	2	—		—		18	3
Çaykur Rizespor	Total		43	2	5	2	—		—		48	4
Kalmar FF	2023	Allsvenskan	30	9	1	0	2 (Note: Appearance(s) in UEFA Europa Conference League)	0	—		33	9
Djurgårdens IF	2024	Allsvenskan	30	14	6	4	9	5	—		45	23
Career total			270	70	30	9	11	5	1	0	312	84

== Honours ==
Troyes

- Ligue 2: 2014–15

Djurgårdens IF

- Svenska Cupen runner-up: 2023–24

Gamba Osaka

- AFC Champions League Two: 2025–26

Individual

- J1 100 Year Vision League Regional Round West Best Eleven: 2026
