= 2025–26 AFC Champions League Two =

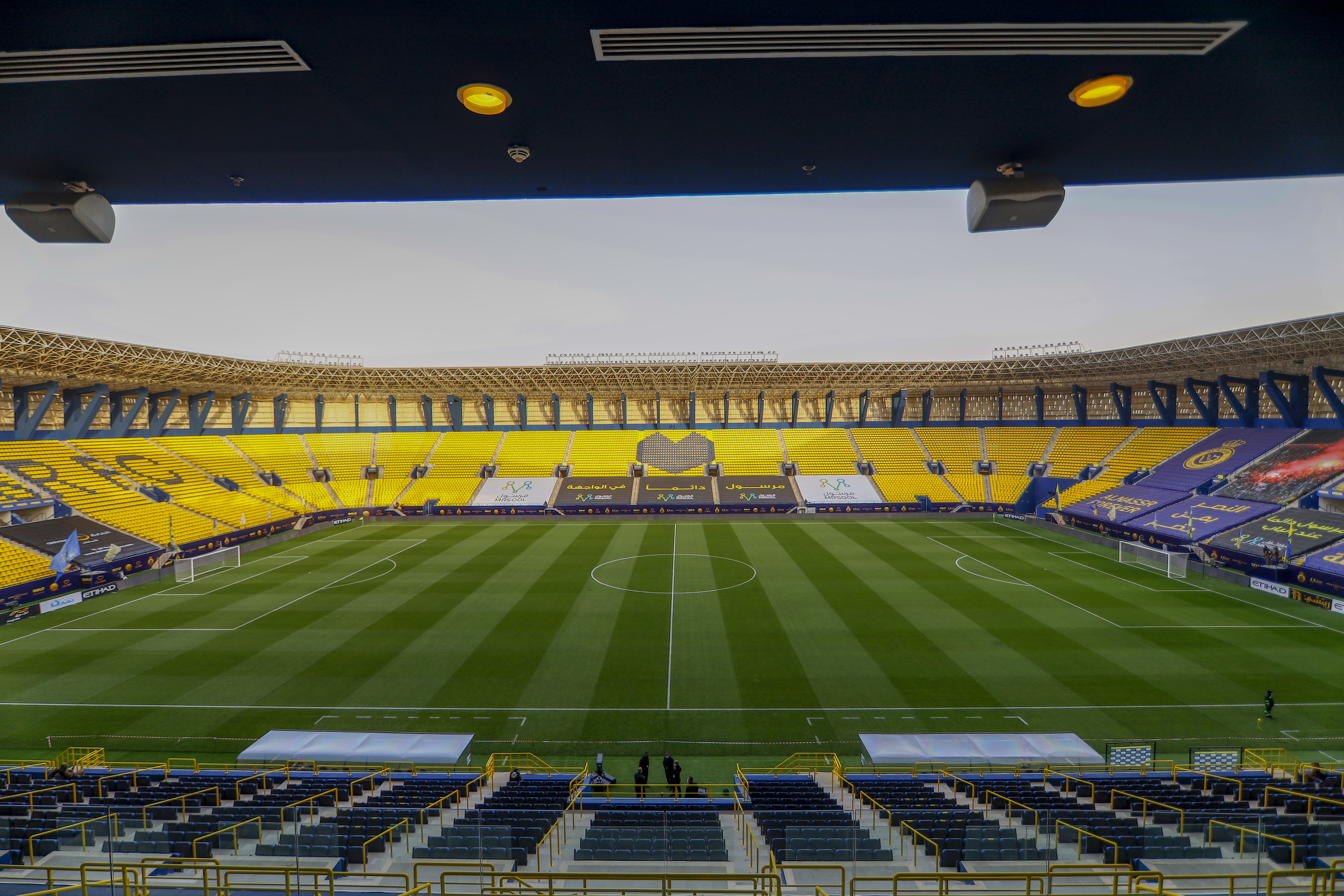
- King Saud University Stadium in Riyadh hosted the final

Tournament details
- Dates: Qualifying: 13 August 2025; Competition proper: 16 September 2025 – 16 May 2026
- Teams: Competition proper: 32; Total: 35 (from 23 associations)

Final positions
- Champions: (Japan) Gamba Osaka (1st title)
- Runners-up: (Saudi Arabia) Al-Nassr

Tournament statistics
- Matches played: 116
- Goals scored: 334 (2.88 per match)
- Attendance: 777,086 (6,699 per match)
- Top scorer: (Malta) Trent Buhagiar (8 goals)
- Best player: (Tunisia) Issam Jebali

The 2025–26 AFC Champions League Two was the 22nd edition of the Asia's second-tier club football tournament, organized by the Asian Football Confederation (AFC), and the second under the AFC Champions League Two title. It featured 32 teams in the group stage.

The final was held at King Saud University Stadium in Riyadh, between Gamba Osaka and Al-Nassr. Gamba Osaka won 1–0, with Deniz Hümmet scoring the match's only goal, to give the club its first title. As winners, they qualified to the preliminary stage of the 2026–27 AFC Champions League Elite.

Sharjah were the reigning champions. They were unable to defend their title as they participated in the AFC Champions League Elite league stage instead.

== Association team allocation ==
The associations were allocated slots according to their club competitions ranking, which was published after the 2023–24 competitions were completed. Slots were subject to later re-balancing based on the 2024–25 competition results.

Participation for 2025–26 AFC Champions League Two
Participating
Not participating

West Region (4 groups)
Rank		Member association	Points	Slots	
Rank		Member association	Points	Group stage	Play-off
Zone	AFC	Member association	Points	Group stage	Play-off
1	1	Saudi Arabia	103.148	1	0
2	4	United Arab Emirates	74.873	1	0
3	5	Qatar	70.330	1	0
4	6	Iran	68.640	1 (+1 ACLE)	0
5	9	Uzbekistan	47.259	1	0
6	10	Iraq	37.118	1	0
7	13	Jordan	30.403	2	0
8	16	Bahrain	23.368	2	0
9	17	India	22.806	1	1
10	18	Tajikistan	22.493	1	1
11	19	Turkmenistan	20.217	0 (+1 ACGL)	1
12	20	Oman	20.048	0	1
Total		Participating associations: 12		14	4
Total		Participating associations: 12		18	

East Region (4 groups)
Rank		Member association	Points	Slots	
Rank		Member association	Points	Group stage	Play-off
Zone	AFC	Member association	Points	Group stage	Play-off
1	2	Japan	96.999	1	0
2	3	South Korea	93.600	1	0
3	7	China	57.764	1	0
4	8	Thailand	49.546	2 (+1 ACLE)	0
5	11	Australia	34.703	1	0
6	12	Malaysia	31.331	1	0
7	14	Vietnam	28.657	2	0
8	15	Hong Kong	26.888	2	0
9	23	Singapore	17.350	2	0
10	25	Philippines	16.230	1	1
11	28	Indonesia	14.816	0	1
12	29	North Korea	13.923	0	0
Total		Participating associations: 11		15	2
Total		Participating associations: 11		17	

Notes

1. AFC Licensing (AFC): Association did not have a licensed club.
2. Thailand (THA): As North Korea had no licensed teams to participate in AFC club competitions, their ACL2 spot was redistributed to the highest eligible Member Association (Thailand). The indirect slot later received a bye in the play-off round due to an insufficient number of participating teams.

== Teams ==
The number of appearances and last appearance include the AFC Cup as the predecessor of the AFC Champions League Two.

Entry round	West Region			East Region		
Group stage	Team	Qualifying method	App. (last)	Team	Qualifying method	App. (last)
Group stage	(Iran) Sepahan	2025–26 AFC Champions League Elite qualifying round loser	2nd (2024–25)	(Thailand) Bangkok United	2025–26 AFC Champions League Elite qualifying round loser	2nd (2024–25)
Group stage	(Saudi Arabia) Al-Nassr	2024–25 Saudi Pro League third place	1st	(Japan) Gamba Osaka	2024 J1 League fourth place	1st
Group stage	(United Arab Emirates) Al Wasl	2024–25 UAE Pro League fourth place	1st	(South Korea) Pohang Steelers	2024 Korean FA Cup winners	1st
Group stage	(Qatar) Al Ahli	2024–25 Qatar Stars League fourth place	1st	(China) Beijing Guoan	2024 Chinese Super League fourth place	1st
Group stage	(Iran) Esteghlal	2024–25 Hazfi Cup winners	1st	(Thailand) BG Pathum United	2024–25 Thai League 1 third place	1st
Group stage	(Uzbekistan) Andijon	2024 Uzbekistan Cup winners	1st	(Thailand) Ratchaburi	2024–25 Thai League 1 fourth place	1st
Group stage	(Iraq) Al-Zawraa	2024–25 Iraq Stars League runners-up	6th (2023–24)	(Australia) Macarthur FC	2024 Australia Cup winners	2nd (2023–24)
Group stage	(Jordan) Al-Hussein	2024–25 Jordanian Pro League champions	3rd (2024–25)	(Malaysia) Selangor	2024–25 Malaysia Super League runners-up	7th (2024–25)
Group stage	(Jordan) Al-Wehdat	2024–25 Jordan FA Cup winners	14th (2024–25)	(Vietnam) Nam Định	2024–25 V.League 1 champions	2nd (2024–25)
Group stage	(Bahrain) Al-Muharraq	2024–25 Bahraini Premier League champions	8th (2021)	(Vietnam) Công An Hà Nội	2024–25 Vietnamese Cup winners	1st
Group stage	(Bahrain) Al Khaldiya	2024–25 Bahraini King's Cup winners	3rd (2024–25)	(Hong Kong) Tai Po	2024–25 Hong Kong Premier League champions	3rd (2019)
Group stage	(India) Mohun Bagan SG	2024–25 Indian Super League league shield winners	8th (2023–24)	(Hong Kong) Eastern	2024–25 Hong Kong FA Cup winners	5th (2024–25)
Group stage	(Tajikistan) Istiklol	2024 Tajikistan Higher League champions	8th (2024–25)	(Singapore) Lion City Sailors	2024–25 Singapore Premier League champions 2024–25 Singapore Cup winners	12th (2024–25)
Group stage	(Turkmenistan) Arkadag	2024–25 AFC Challenge League winners	1st	(Singapore) Tampines Rovers	2024–25 Singapore Premier League runners-up	16th (2024–25)
Group stage				(Philippines) Kaya–Iloilo	2024–25 Philippines Football League champions	6th (2024–25)
Preliminary stage	(India) Goa	2025 Super Cup winners	1st	(Indonesia) Persib	2024–25 Liga 1 champions	3rd (2024–25)
Preliminary stage	(Turkmenistan) Ahal	2024 Ýokary Liga runners-up	6th (2021)	(Philippines) Manila Digger	2024–25 Philippines Football League runners-up	1st
Preliminary stage	(Tajikistan) Regar-TadAZ Tursunzoda	2024 Tajikistan Cup winners	2nd (2013)			
Preliminary stage	(Oman) Al-Seeb	2024–25 Oman Professional League champions	2nd (2022)			

Notes

1. China (CHN): As 2024 Chinese FA Cup winners Shanghai Port qualified for the Champions League Elite via their league position, the spot reserved for the Chinese FA Cup winners was transferred to the fourth-placed team in the 2024 Chinese Super League.
2. India (IND): Considered to have withdrawn during the league stage.
3. Iraq (IRQ): As 2024–25 Iraq FA Cup winners Duhok failed to obtain an AFC license, their AFC Champions League Two group stage spot was passed to the 2024–25 Iraq Stars League runners-up.
4. Japan (JPN): As 2024 Emperor's Cup winners Vissel Kobe qualified for the Champions League Elite via their league position, the spot reserved for the Emperor's Cup winners was transferred to the fourth-placed team in the 2024 J1 League.
5. Malaysia (MAS): As 2024 Malaysia FA Cup winners Johor Darul Ta'zim qualified for the Champions League Elite via their league position, the spot reserved for the Malaysia FA Cup winners was transferred to the runners-up of the 2024–25 Malaysia Super League.
6. Qatar (QAT): As regular season third place, Al-Gharafa, qualified for the Champions League Elite via winning the 2025 Emir of Qatar Cup, the spot reserved for the third-placed team was transferred to the fourth-placed team in the 2024–25 Qatar Stars League.
7. Saudi Arabia (KSA): As 2024–25 Saudi King's Cup winners Al-Ittihad qualified for the Champions League Elite via their league position, the spot reserved for the King's Cup winners was transferred to the third-placed team in the 2024–25 Saudi Pro League.
8. Singapore (SGP): As 2024–25 Singapore Cup winners Lion City Sailors qualified for the Champions League Two via their league position, the spot reserved for the Singapore Cup winners was transferred to the runners-up in the 2024–25 Singapore Premier League.
9. Turkmenistan (TKM): As Arkadag won the 2024–25 AFC Challenge League and the 2024 Ýokary Liga, Turkmenistan was allocated a spot in the group stage. The qualifying play-off slot reserved for the Ýokary Liga champions was transferred to the runners-up, Ahal.
10. United Arab Emirates (UAE): As 2024–25 UAE President's Cup winners Shabab Al Ahli and Sharjah qualified for the Champions League Elite via their league position and winning the previous edition of this competition respectively, the spot reserved for the UAE President’s Cup was transferred to the third-placed team in the 2024–25 UAE Pro League. The spot originally reserved for the third-placed team was then transferred to the fourth-placed team.

== Schedule ==
The quarter-finals for the West region were postponed due to the impacts from the 2026 Iran War.

The schedule of the competition was as follows.

Stage	Round	Draw date	West Region	East Region
Preliminary stage	Preliminary stage 1	No draw (Note: Pre-determined format)	13 August 2025	
Group stage	Matchday 1	15 August 2025	16–17 September 2025	17–18 September 2025
Group stage	Matchday 2	15 August 2025	30 September and 1 October 2025	1–2 October 2025
Group stage	Matchday 3	15 August 2025	21–22 October 2025	22–23 October 2025
Group stage	Matchday 4	15 August 2025	4–5 November 2025	5–6 November 2025
Group stage	Matchday 5	15 August 2025	28–29 October (Note: for Bahraini clubs) and 25–29 November 2025	26–27 November 2025
Group stage	Matchday 6	15 August 2025	23–24 December 2025	10–11 December 2025
Knockout stage	Round of 16	30 December 2025	10–11 and 17–18 February 2026	11–12 and 18–19 February 2026
Knockout stage	Quarter-finals	30 December 2025	19 April 2026	4–5 and 11–12 March 2026
Knockout stage	Semi-finals	30 December 2025	22 April 2026	8 and 15 April 2026
Knockout stage	Final	30 December 2025	16 May 2026 at King Saud University Stadium, Riyadh	

== Preliminary stage ==
The three winners of the preliminary stage (two from West Region and one from East Region) advanced to the group stage to join the 29 direct entrants. The losers of the qualifying play-offs entered the group stage of the 2025–26 AFC Challenge League.

Team 1	Score	Team 2
West Region
Goa (India)	2–1	(Oman) Al-Seeb
RT Tursunzoda (Tajikistan)	1–2	(Turkmenistan) Ahal
East Region
Persib (Indonesia)	2–1	(Philippines) Manila Digger

=== West Region ===
13 August 2025
19:30 UTC+5:30

Goa (India)	2–1	(Oman) Al-Seeb
Dražić 24'; Siverio 52'	AFC Report; GSA Report	Nasser 60'

Jawaharlal Nehru Stadium, Goa
Attendance: 12,314
Referee: Zhang Lei (China)
13 August 2025
17:00 UTC+5

Regar-TadAZ Tursunzoda (Tajikistan)	1–2	(Turkmenistan) Ahal
Atsam 64'	AFC Report; GSA Report	Gürgenow 62'; Mirzoýew 82'

TALCO Arena, Tursunzoda
Attendance: 6,350
Referee: Choi Hyun-jai (South Korea)

=== East Region ===
13 August 2025
19:00 UTC+7

Persib (Indonesia)	2–1	(Philippines) Manila Digger
Asong 38' (o.g.); Barros 76'	AFC Report; GSA Report	Joof 66'

Gelora Bandung Lautan Api, Bandung
Attendance: 5,844
Referee: Omar Al-Yaqoubi (Oman)

== Group stage ==
The group stage draw took place on 15 August 2025 in Kuala Lumpur, Malaysia.

Location of the 2025–26 AFC Champions League Two group stage teams Brown: Group A; Cyan: Group B; Orange: Group C; Yellow: Group D; Pink: Group E; Green: Group F; Blue: Group G; Red: Group H

Locations of the 2025–26 AFC Champions League Two teams in Central Thailand

=== West Region ===
==== Group A ====
Pos	Team	Pld	W	D	L	GF	GA	GD	Pts	Qualification	WAS	EST	MUH	ALW
1	(United Arab Emirates) Al Wasl	6	4	2	0	15	6	+9	14	Advance to round of 16	—	7–1	2–2	2–1
2	(Iran) Esteghlal	6	2	2	2	8	10	−2	8	Advance to round of 16	1–1	—	0–1	2–0
3	(Bahrain) Al-Muharraq	6	2	1	3	8	8	0	7		0–1	0–3	—	4–0
4	(Jordan) Al-Wehdat	6	1	1	4	5	12	−7	4		1–2	1–1	2–1	—

Source: ACL2
Rules for classification: Tiebreakers

==== Group B ====
Pos	Team	Pld	W	D	L	GF	GA	GD	Pts	Qualification	AHL	ARK	KHA	AND
1	(Qatar) Al Ahli	6	2	4	0	7	4	+3	10	Advance to round of 16	—	2–2	0–0	2–0
2	(Turkmenistan) Arkadag	6	1	4	1	5	6	−1	7	Advance to round of 16	1–1	—	1–0	0–0
3	(Bahrain) Al Khaldiya	6	1	3	2	3	3	0	6		1–2	2–0	—	0–0
4	(Uzbekistan) Andijon	6	0	5	1	1	3	−2	5		0–0	1–1	0–0	—

Source: ACL2
Rules for classification: Tiebreakers

==== Group C ====
Pos	Team	Pld	W	D	L	GF	GA	GD	Pts	Qualification	ALH	SEP	AHA	MBG
1	(Jordan) Al-Hussein	4	3	0	1	8	4	+4	9	Advance to round of 16	—	1–0	3–1	~~21 Oct~~
2	(Iran) Sepahan	4	2	1	1	5	3	+2	7	Advance to round of 16	2–0	—	2–2	~~30 Sep~~
3	(Turkmenistan) Ahal	4	0	1	3	4	10	−6	1		1–4	0–1	—	~~25 Nov~~
4	(India) Mohun Bagan	0	0	0	0	0	0	0	0	Withdrew (Note: On 27 September 2025, AFC announced that Mohun Bagan SG were considered to have withdrawn from the AFC Champions League Two after they failed to travel to Iran to play their fixture against Sepahan in Isfahan, citing security concerns. Their single match played, a 1–0 defeat to Ahal, was annulled and all their remaining matches were cancelled. This was the second year in a row that Mohun Bagan had been withdrawn from the competition for refusing to fulfill a fixture in Iran. In December 2025 the AFC banned them from entering the following season's AFC competitions, meaning they will not be eligible to re-enter the Champions League until the 2027–28 season)	~~4 Nov~~	~~23 Dec~~	~~0–1~~	—

Source: ACL2
Rules for classification: Tiebreakers

==== Group D ====
Pos	Team	Pld	W	D	L	GF	GA	GD	Pts	Qualification	NSR	ZWR	IST	GOA
1	(Saudi Arabia) Al-Nassr	6	6	0	0	22	2	+20	18	Advance to round of 16	—	5–1	5–0	4–0
2	(Iraq) Al-Zawraa	6	3	0	3	8	11	−3	9	Advance to round of 16	0–2	—	2–1	2–1
3	(Tajikistan) Istiklol	6	3	0	3	7	13	−6	9		0–4	2–1	—	2–0
4	(India) Goa	6	0	0	6	3	14	−11	0		1–2	0–2	1–2	—

Source: ACL2
Rules for classification: Tiebreakers

=== East Region ===
==== Group E ====
Pos	Team	Pld	W	D	L	GF	GA	GD	Pts	Qualification	MAC	HNP	TPF	BJG
1	(Australia) Macarthur FC	6	4	1	1	11	6	+5	13	Advance to round of 16	—	2–1	2–1	3–0
2	(Vietnam) Công An Hà Nội	6	2	2	2	9	7	+2	8	Advance to round of 16	1–1	—	3–0	2–1
3	(Hong Kong) Tai Po	6	2	1	3	7	12	−5	7		2–1	1–0	—	3–3
4	(China) Beijing Guoan	6	1	2	3	10	12	−2	5		1–2	2–2	3–0	—

Source: ACL2
Rules for classification: Tiebreakers

==== Group F ====
Pos	Team	Pld	W	D	L	GF	GA	GD	Pts	Qualification	GOS	RPM	TND	EAS
1	(Japan) Gamba Osaka	6	6	0	0	16	2	+14	18	Advance to round of 16	—	2–0	3–1	3–1
2	(Thailand) Ratchaburi	6	3	0	3	15	8	+7	9	Advance to round of 16	0–2	—	2–0	5–1
3	(Vietnam) Nam Định	6	3	0	3	14	7	+7	9		0–1	3–1	—	9–0
4	(Hong Kong) Eastern	6	0	0	6	2	30	−28	0		0–5	0–7	0–1	—

Source: ACL2
Rules for classification: Tiebreakers

==== Group G ====
Pos	Team	Pld	W	D	L	GF	GA	GD	Pts	Qualification	PSB	BKU	LCS	SEL
1	(Indonesia) Persib	6	4	1	1	11	6	+5	13	Advance to round of 16	—	1–0	1–1	2–0
2	(Thailand) Bangkok United	6	3	1	2	8	7	+1	10 (Note: Head-to-head points: Bangkok United 6, Lion City Sailors 0.)	Advance to round of 16	0–2	—	1–0	1–1
3	(Singapore) Lion City Sailors	6	3	1	2	10	8	+2	10		3–2	1–2	—	4–2
4	(Malaysia) Selangor	6	0	1	5	7	15	−8	1		2–3	2–4	0–1	—

Source: ACL2
Rules for classification: Tiebreakers

==== Group H ====
Pos	Team	Pld	W	D	L	GF	GA	GD	Pts	Qualification	BGT	PHS	BGP	KAY
1	(Singapore) Tampines Rovers	6	5	1	0	14	5	+9	16	Advance to round of 16	—	1–0	2–1	5–3
2	(South Korea) Pohang Steelers	6	4	1	1	7	2	+5	13	Advance to round of 16	1–1	—	2–0	2–0
3	(Thailand) BG Pathum United	6	2	0	4	5	8	−3	6		0–2	0–1	—	2–1
4	(Philippines) Kaya–Iloilo	6	0	0	6	4	15	−11	0		0–3	0–1	0–2	—

Source: ACL2
Rules for classification: Tiebreakers

== Knockout stage ==
In the knockout stage, 16 teams played a single-elimination tournament, split by Region. Each tie was played on a home-and-away two-legged basis, except the final which was played as a single match. Extra time and penalty shoot-out would be used to decide the winners if necessary (Regulations Article 10). The order of matches (home vs away) was determined at the draw, except for the final, which was pre-determined on a rotation basis, with the match to be hosted by the team from the West Region. The draw for the knockout stage was held on 30 December 2025.

=== Bracket ===
Round of 16
(Iraq) Al-Zawraa	3	2	5
(United Arab Emirates) Al Wasl (a.e.t.)	2	4	6
(Turkmenistan) Arkadag	0	0	0
(Saudi Arabia) Al-Nassr	1	1	2
West Region
(Iran) Sepahan	2	0	2
(Qatar) Al Ahli (a.e.t.)	2	1	3
(Iran) Esteghlal	0	2	2
(Jordan) Al-Hussein	1	3	4
(South Korea) Pohang Steelers	1	1	2
(Japan) Gamba Osaka	1	2	3
(Thailand) Ratchaburi	3	0	3
(Indonesia) Persib	0	1	1
East Region
(Thailand) Bangkok United	2	2	4
(Australia) Macarthur FC	0	2	2
(Vietnam) Công An Hà Nội	0	1	1
(Singapore) Tampines Rovers	3	3	6

Quarter-finals
(United Arab Emirates) Al Wasl	0
(Saudi Arabia) Al-Nassr	4
(Qatar) Al Ahli	3
(Jordan) Al-Hussein	1
(Japan) Gamba Osaka (a.e.t.)	1	2	3
(Thailand) Ratchaburi	1	1	2
(Thailand) Bangkok United	2	2	4
(Singapore) Tampines Rovers	1	2	3

Semi-finals
(Saudi Arabia) Al-Nassr	5
(Qatar) Al Ahli	1
(Japan) Gamba Osaka	0	3	3
(Thailand) Bangkok United	1	0	1

Final
16 May – Riyadh
(Saudi Arabia) Al-Nassr	0
(Japan) Gamba Osaka	1

=== Summary ===
The first legs were played on 10 and 12 February, and the second legs were played on 17 and 19 February 2026.

Team 1	Agg.	Team 2	1st leg	2nd leg
West Region
Al-Zawraa (Iraq)	5–6	(United Arab Emirates) Al Wasl	3–2	2–4 (a.e.t.)
Arkadag (Turkmenistan)	0–2	(Saudi Arabia) Al-Nassr	0–1	0–1
Sepahan (Iran)	2–3	(Qatar) Al Ahli	2–2	0–1 (a.e.t.)
Esteghlal (Iran)	2–4	(Jordan) Al-Hussein	0–1	2–3
East Region
Pohang Steelers (South Korea)	2–3	(Japan) Gamba Osaka	1–1	1–2
Ratchaburi (Thailand)	3–1	(Indonesia) Persib	3–0	0–1
Bangkok United (Thailand)	4–2	(Australia) Macarthur FC	2–0	2–2
Công An Hà Nội (Vietnam)	1–6	(Singapore) Tampines Rovers	0–3 (Note: Tampines Rovers were awarded a 3–0 victory by forfeit, after Công An Hà Nội fielded two ineligible players, Stefan Mauk and Rogério Alves. The score on the field was originally a 4–0 win by Công An Hà Nội.)	1–3

=== Summary ===
The West Region quarter-finals fixtures were originally scheduled to take place between 3 and 10 March, but were postponed by the AFC due to impacts from the 2026 Iran war. The quarter-finals for the West Region were rescheduled to take place on 19 April, as single-legged ties.

The first legs for the East Region were played on 4 and 5 March, with the second legs played on 11 and 12 March.

Team 1	Score	Team 2
West Region
Al Wasl (United Arab Emirates)	0–4	(Saudi Arabia) Al-Nassr
Al Ahli (Qatar)	3–1	(Jordan) Al-Hussein

Team 1	Agg.	Team 2	1st leg	2nd leg
East Region
Gamba Osaka (Japan)	3–2	(Thailand) Ratchaburi	1–1	2–1 (a.e.t.)
Bangkok United (Thailand)	4–3	(Singapore) Tampines Rovers	2–1	2–2

=== Summary ===
The East Region first leg was played on 8 April, and the second leg was played on 15 April. The semi-final for the West Region was played on 22 April.

Team 1	Score	Team 2
West Region
Al-Nassr (Saudi Arabia)	5–1	(Qatar) Al Ahli

Team 1	Agg.	Team 2	1st leg	2nd leg
East Region
Gamba Osaka (Japan)	3–1	(Thailand) Bangkok United	0–1	3–0

=== Final ===
16 May 2026
20:45 UTC+3

Al-Nassr (Saudi Arabia)	0–1	(Japan) Gamba Osaka
	Report	Hümmet 30'

King Saud University Stadium, Riyadh
Attendance: 25,207
Referee: Abdullah Jamali (Kuwait)

== Top scorers ==
Team eliminated for this round / inactive for this round / Matches voided by AFC / Player left the team

Rank	Player	Team	MD1	MD2	MD3	MD4	MD5	MD6	R16-1	R16-2	QF1	QF2	SF1	SF2	F	Total
1	(Malta) Trent Buhagiar	(Singapore) Tampines Rovers	2	1			1	1		1	1	1				8
2	(France) Kingsley Coman	(Saudi Arabia) Al-Nassr	1					2					3			6
2	(Spain) Tana	(Thailand) Ratchaburi	1		1	2			2							6
2	(Japan) Hide Higashikawa	(Singapore) Tampines Rovers		1	1		2			2						6
2	(Oman) Muhsen Al-Ghassani	(Thailand) Bangkok United	1		1	1				2			1			6
2	(Netherlands) Michel Vlap	(Qatar) Al Ahli			1	1		2	1		1					6
7	(Nigeria) Ibrahim Gbadamosi	(Iraq) Al-Zawraa			1	1		1		2						5
7	(Brazil) Brenner	(Vietnam) Nam Dinh	2					3								5
7	(Brazil) Denílson	(Thailand) Ratchaburi			3	2										5
7	(Brazil) Anderson Lopes	(Singapore) Lion City Sailors		4			1									5
7	(France) Andrew Jung	(Indonesia) Persib		1	1	1	1			1						5
7	(Japan) Ryoya Yamashita	(Japan) Gamba Osaka					1	1	1	1				1		5

Note

- Goals scored in the qualifying play-offs and matches voided by AFC are not counted when determining top scorer (Regulations Article 64.4)

== See also ==
- 2025–26 AFC Champions League Elite
- 2025–26 AFC Challenge League
- 2025–26 AFC Women's Champions League
