= 2018 Gamba Osaka season =

Gamba Osaka
2018 season
- Chairman: Takashi Yamauchi
- Manager: Levir Culpi until July 23; Tsuneyasu Miyamoto from July 23
- J1 League: 9th
- Emperor's Cup: 2nd round
- J.League Cup: Quarter-final
- Top goalscorer: League: Hwang 16; All: Hwang 21
- Highest home attendance: 35,242 vs Cerezo Osaka 21 Apr
- Lowest home attendance: 3,103 vs Kwansei Gakuin University 6 June (Emperor's Cup)
- Average home league attendance: 23,485
Home colours	Away colours

The 2018 Gamba Osaka season was Gamba Osaka's 25th season in the J1 League and 31st overall in the Japanese top flight. It saw them compete in the 18 team J1 League as well as the J.League Cup and Emperor's Cup competitions.

Gamba began the season with a new manager in the shape of Brazilian, former Cerezo Osaka boss Levir Culpi who replaced long-standing manager Kenta Hasegawa who moved to FC Tokyo.

Culpi was fired after poor form saw Gamba sit in the J1 relegation zone at the halfway point of the season. He was replaced by Gamba Under-23 manager Tsuneyasu Miyamoto on July 23.

== Transfers ==
Prior to the end of 2017, Gamba announced the capture of young defenders; Tetsuya Yamaguchi and Riku Matsuda as well as midfielder Yuya Fukuda all straight out of high school. Meanwhile, midfielder Ren Shibamoto and attacker Haruto Shirai were promoted to the first team squad after impressing for Gamba's Under-23 side in J3 during 2017.

Shortly before Christmas the signings of attacking midfielder Shinya Yajima and former Gamba youth product, centre-back Shunya Suganuma were announced, with the duo arriving from Urawa Reds and Montedio Yamagata respectively. This news was followed a few days later with the news of the signing of Japan Under-17 midfielder Keito Nakamura from Tokyo-based Mitsubishi Yowa SC as well as the promotion of Under-23 goalkeeper Kosei Tani to the first team squad.

2 league games into the campaign and Gamba secured the signing of former Brazil Under-20 defensive midfielder Matheus Jesus on loan from Portuguese side Estoril. His contracted would run until the end of the year.

Long serving goalkeeper Yosuke Fujigaya, who had made over 250 league appearances for the club announced his retirement at the end of the 2017 season after spending the previous 3 years providing backup to established number 1, Masaaki Higashiguchi. Holding midfielder Tatsuya Uchida turned his loan move to Tokyo Verdy into a permanent one and he would be joined at the Tokyo club by young forward Hiromu Kori who had spent the previous season on loan with Gamba Under-23, scoring 3 goals in 17 appearances.

Additionally experienced Japanese-born but Korean passport holding centre-back Kim Jung-ya moved to Vegalta Sendai, while Kashima Antlers forward Shuhei Akasaki returned to his parent club following a disappointing loan spell which yielded only 2 goals. Another forward with a poor goalscoring record, Hiroto Goya moved to J2 League outfit Tokushima Vortis in an effort to rediscover his scoring touch, he would be joined in J2 by backup goalkeeper Ken Tajiri who extended his loan spell at Zweigen Kanazawa for a further season. Gamba U-23 centre back and sometimes central midfielder made the move to J3 side Grulla Morioka after making close to 50 appearances in J3 but failing to crack Gamba's senior side.

At the beginning of January, a press conference was held confirming that key central midfielder Yosuke Ideguchi would join English EFL Championship side Leeds United. The Japanese international would however join Spanish Segunda División outfit Cultural Leonesa on loan for the remainder of the 2017–18 European club season. In the day's following Ideguchi's departure it was confirmed that young utility player So Hirao had been allowed to join Avispa Fukuoka on loan for 2018 and centre-back / defensive midfielder Shogo Nakahara had completed his loan spell with the club and would return to his parent club, Consadole Sapporo. Veteran midfielder Takahiro Futagawa also announced that he would spend another year on loan with Tokyo Verdy in J2 having spend the previous 18 months in Japan's capital.

The first of February saw the announcement that young South Korean centre-back Bae Soo-yong would join J3 outfit Giravanz Kitakyushu on a season long loan. He spent the 2017 campaign with Gamba's Under-23 side, scoring once in 24 games and earning to red cards in the process.

During the mid-season transfer window, it was announced at the end of June that midfielders Shinya Yajima and Jin Izumisawa would spend the second half of the year on loan at Vegalta Sendai and Tokyo Verdy respectively. Both players had struggled for game time with the top team and had spent large chunks of the season playing with Gamba U-23 in J3. Their departures cleared the way for the arrival of Renofa Yamaguchi midfielder Kosuke Onose at the end of July.

Following the departure of Brazilian coach Levir Culpi in July, Matheus Jesus, who Culpi brought to the club on loan at the start of the season, found game time hard to come by and his loan from Portuguese side Estoril was cancelled by mutual consent. New head coach Tsuneyasu Miyamoto moved further to re-shape the squad by bringing in Vissel Kobe striker Kazuma Watanabe on a permanent deal while the tall Shun Nagasawa moved in the opposite direction on loan until the end of the year.

=== In ===
No.	Pos	Player	Transferred From	Fee	Date	Source
34	MF	(Japan) Yuya Fukuda	(Japan) Higashi Fukuoka High School	Unknown	11 Oct 2017	
35	DF	(Japan) Tatsuya Yamaguchi	(Japan) Sagami Senior High School	Unknown	18 Oct 2017	
36	DF	(Japan) Riku Matsuda	(Japan) Maebashi Ikuei High School	Unknown	28 Nov 2017	
32	MF	(Japan) Ren Shibamoto	(Japan) Gamba Osaka U-23	Promotion	28 Nov 2017	
37	FW	(Japan) Haruto Shirai	(Japan) Gamba Osaka U-23	Promotion	28 Nov 2017	
13	DF	(Japan) Shunya Suganuma	(Japan) Montedio Yamagata	Unknown	21 Dec 2017	
21	MF	(Japan) Shinya Yajima	(Japan) Urawa Red Diamonds	Unknown	21 Dec 2017	
38	FW	(Japan) Keito Nakamura	(Japan) Mitsubishi Yowa	Unknown	26 Dec 2017	
41	GK	(Japan) Kosei Tani	(Japan) Gamba Osaka U-23	Promotion	26 Dec 2017	
8	MF	(Brazil) Matheus Jesus	(Portugal) Estoril	Loan	7 Mar 2018	
50	MF	(Japan) Kosuke Onose	(Japan) Renofa Yamaguchi	Unknown	31 July 2018	
39	FW	(Japan) Kazuma Watanabe	(Japan) Vissel Kobe	Unknown	13 Aug 2018	

=== Out ===
No.	Pos	Player	Transferred To	Fee	Date	Source
18	GK	(Japan) Yōsuke Fujigaya	retired	N/A	28 Nov 2017	
29	FW	(Japan) Hiromu Kori	(Japan) Tokyo Verdy	End of Loan	18 Dec 2017	
6	DF	(Japan) Kim Jung-ya	(Japan) Vegalta Sendai	Unknown	21 Dec 2017	
N/A	MF	(Japan) Tatsuya Uchida	(Japan) Tokyo Verdy	Unknown	21 Dec 2017	
28	MF	(Japan) Shota Yomesaka	(Japan) Grulla Morioka	Unknown	25 Dec 2017	
53	FW	(Japan) Shuhei Akasaki	(Japan) Kashima Antlers	Loan Return	26 Dec 2017	
16	GK	(Japan) Ken Tajiri	(Japan) Zweigen Kanazawa	Loan Extension	27 Dec 2017	
13	FW	(Japan) Hiroto Goya	(Japan) Tokushima Vortis	Loan	28 Dec 2017	
8	MF	(Japan) Yosuke Ideguchi	(England) Leeds United	Unknown	4 Jan 2018	
30	DF	(Japan) So Hirao	(Japan) Avispa Fukuoka	Loan	5 Jan 2018	
23	MF	(Japan) Shogo Nakahara	(Japan) Consadole Sapporo	Loan Return	6 Jan 2018	
N/A	MF	(Japan) Takahiro Futagawa	(Japan) Tokyo Verdy	Loan Extension	11 Jan 2018	
42	DF	(South Korea) Bae Soo-yong	(Japan) Giravanz Kitakyushu	Loan	1 Feb 2018	
21	MF	(Japan) Shinya Yajima	(Japan) Vegalta Sendai	Loan	25 June 2018	
39	MF	(Japan) Jin Izumisawa	(Japan) Tokyo Verdy	Loan	25 June 2018	
8	MF	(Brazil) Matheus Jesus	(Portugal) Estoril	Loan End	11 Aug 2018	
20	FW	(Japan) Shun Nagasawa	(Japan) Vissel Kobe	Loan	13 Aug 2018	

== Coaching staff ==
The Coaching Staff for the 2018 J1 League season;

Position	Staff
First-team Manager	(Japan) Tsuneyasu Miyamoto
Head Coach	(Japan) Sanjiyoshi Noritada
Goalkeeper Coach	(Japan) Naoki Matsuyo
Physical Coach	(South Korea) Yi Chang-yeob
Coach	(Japan) Arata Kodama
Coach	(Japan) Satoshi Yamaguchi

== First team squad ==
Appearances and goals as of the beginning of the 2018 season.

No.	Name	Nationality	Position(s)	Date of birth (age)	Height (cm)	Weight (kg)	Since	Previous Club	Games played	Goals scored
Goalkeepers
1	Masaaki Higashiguchi	(Japan)	GK	12 May 1986 (aged 32)	184	78	2014	Albirex Niigata	187	0
23	Mizuki Hayashi	(Japan)	GK	4 September 1996 (aged 22)	182	74	2015	Gamba Osaka Youth	0	0
31	Ryota Suzuki	(Japan)	GK	10 February 1994 (aged 24)	191	85	2017	Tokyo Verdy	1	0
41	Kosei Tani	(Japan)	GK	22 November 2000 (aged 18)	187	78	2018	Gamba Osaka Youth	0	0
Defenders
2	Takaharu Nishino	(Japan)	CB	14 September 1993 (aged 25)	187	73	2017	JEF United*	69	6
3	Fábio	(Brazil)	CB	28 February 1989 (aged 29)	186	78	2017	Yokohama F. Marinos	32	2
4	Hiroki Fujiharu	(Japan)	LB	28 November 1988 (aged 30)	175	60	2011	Osaka University of H&SS	281	12
5	Genta Miura (captain)	(Japan)	CB / RB	1 March 1995 (aged 23)	183	77	2017	Shimizu S-Pulse	45	3
6	Ryo Hatsuse	(Japan)	RB / LB / RM	10 July 1997 (aged 21)	175	64	2015	Gamba Osaka Youth	36	1
13	Shunya Suganuma	(Japan)	CB	17 May 1990 (aged 28)	182	78	2018	Montedio Yamagata	1	0
14	Koki Yonekura	(Japan)	RB / RW	17 May 1988 (aged 30)	176	68	2014	JEF United	133	8
16	Hiroki Noda	(Japan)	CB	27 July 1997 (aged 21)	181	73	2016	Otsu High School	1	0
22	Oh Jae-suk	(South Korea)	RB / LB	4 January 1990 (aged 28)	178	74	2013	(South Korea) Gangwon FC	128	0
35	Tatsuya Yamaguchi	(Japan)	LB	9 February 2000 (aged 18)	171	70	2018	Sagami Senior High School	0	0
36	Riku Matsuda	(Japan)	RB / CB	3 May 1999 (aged 19)	175	60	2018	Maebashi Ikuei High School	0	0
Midfielders
7	Yasuhito Endō	(Japan)	CM / AM	28 January 1980 (aged 38)	178	75	2001	Kyoto Purple Sanga	702	123
10	Shu Kurata	(Japan)	RW / LW / CM	26 November 1988 (aged 30)	172	68	2012	Cerezo Osaka*	294	46
15	Yasuyuki Konno	(Japan)	CB / DM	25 January 1983 (aged 35)	178	73	2012	FC Tokyo	252	23
17	Mizuki Ichimaru	(Japan)	DM / CM	8 May 1997 (aged 21)	174	66	2016	Gamba Osaka Youth	4	0
24	Haruya Ide	(Japan)	RB / RW / LW	25 March 1994 (aged 24)	171	66	2017	JEF United	5	1
25	Jungo Fujimoto	(Japan)	RW / LW / AM	24 March 1984 (aged 34)	173	69	2016	Yokohama F. Marinos	43	1
26	Naoya Senoo	(Japan)	LM / AM	15 August 1996 (aged 22)	172	60	2015	Gamba Osaka Youth	1	0
27	Yuto Mori	(Japan)	RB / AM / RM	21 April 1995 (aged 23)	173	68	2017	Nagoya Grampus	0	0
28	Takahiro Ko	(Japan)	CM / DM	20 April 1998 (aged 20)	172	67	2017	Funabashi High School	0	0
29	Leo Takae	(Japan)	CM / LM	27 June 1998 (aged 20)	171	60	2017	Higashi Fukuoka High School	0	0
32	Ren Shibamoto	(Japan)	CM	22 July 1999 (aged 19)	172	59	2018	Gamba Osaka Youth	0	0
34	Yuya Fukuda	(Japan)	CM / LM	4 April 1999 (aged 19)	176	70	2018	Higashi Fukuoka High School	0	0
50	Kosuke Onose	(Japan)	RW / LW / AM	22 April 1993 (aged 25)	176	65	2018	Renofa Yamaguchi	0	0
Strikers
9	Ademilson	(Brazil)	AM / CF	9 January 1994 (aged 24)	176	74	2016	(Brazil) São Paulo	72	19
11	Hwang Ui-jo	(Korea)	AM / CF	28 August 1992 (aged 26)	184	73	2017	(Korea) Seongnam FC	15	3
18	Akito Takagi	(Japan)	CF / RW	4 August 1997 (aged 21)	175	68	2016	Gamba Osaka Youth	10	0
19	Kazunari Ichimi	(Japan)	CF	10 November 1997 (aged 21)	183	74	2016	Otsu High School	0	0
37	Haruto Shirai	(Japan)	CF	23 October 1999 (aged 19)	170	60	2018	Gamba Osaka Youth	0	0
38	Keito Nakamura	(Japan)	AM / CF	28 July 2000 (aged 18)	180	75	2018	Mitsubishi Yowa	0	0
39	Kazuma Watanabe	(Japan)	CF	10 August 1986 (aged 32)	182	79	2018	Vissel Kobe	0	0
40	Ryotaro Meshino	(Japan)	AM / CF	18 June 1998 (aged 20)	171	68	2017	Gamba Osaka Youth	0	0

* indicates player returned to Gamba Osaka from a loan spell with this club.

== J1 League ==
On 13 January, Gamba's first 2 fixtures for the season were announced, at home to Nagoya Grampus and away to Kashima Antlers. The dates for the remaining games were made public on January 24.

Gamba endured something of a roller coaster ride during the 2018 season, a disastrous start under Brazilian coach Levir Culpi, including 5 losses in their first 6 games, saw Gamba spend most of the year facing the very real prospect of relegation to J2. Fortunately after Culpi was replaced by Gamba U-23 coach and club legend Tsuneyasu Miyamoto, their fortunes began to change. Miyamoto's arrival initially brought better performances if not results, but along with returning injured players, midfield general Yasuyuki Konno and Brazilian attacker Ademilson as well as the arrival of the experienced forward Kazuma Watanabe from Vissel Kobe and winger Kosuke Onose from Renofa Yamaguchi, Gamba started to build a head of steam culminating in a 9-game winning streak which propelled them to the top half of the standings and a final position of 9th.

Round	Date	Time*	Opponents	H / A	Result F–A	Scorers	Attendance	League position
1	24 February 2018	14:30	Nagoya Grampus	H	2-3	Endō 13', Nagasawa 79'	28,681	14th
2	3 March 2018	16:00	Kashima Antlers	A	0-1		24,545	17th
3	10 March 2018	13:00	Kawasaki Frontale	A	0-2		22,520	18th
4	18 March 2018	15:00	Kashiwa Reysol	H	2-2	Hwang 21', 86'	21,758	18th
5	31 March 2018	15:00	FC Tokyo	A	2-3	Hwang (pen.) 45'+2, 58'	21,940	18th
6	8 April 2018	15:00	Vissel Kobe	H	0-1		20,606	18th
7	11 April 2018	19:00	Júbilo Iwata	H	2-0	Fábio 4', Hwang 86'	12,615	18th
8	14 April 2018	14:00	V-Varen Nagasaki	A	0-3		8,745	18th
9	21 April 2018	19:00	Cerezo Osaka	H	1-0	Hwang (pen.) 41'	35,242	17th
10	25 April 2018	19:00	Shonan Bellmare	A	0-1		8,002	17th
11	29 April 2018	16:00	Sagan Tosu	H	3-0	Kurata 68', Hwang 82', Matheus 90+2'	18,642	16th
12	2 May 2018	19:00	Vegalta Sendai	H	1-0	Kurata 62'	11,824	15th
13	5 May 2018	14:00	Consadole Sapporo	A	0-2		12,382	16th
14	12 May 2018	19:00	Yokohama F. Marinos	A	1-1	Fujimoto 52'	21,576	16th
15	19 May 2018	14:00	Urawa Red Diamonds	H	0-0		25,361	16th
16	18 July 2018	19:00	Sanfrecce Hiroshima	A	0-4		7,835	16th
17	22 July 2018	19:00	Shimizu S-Pulse	H	1-2	Hwang 75'	17,542	16th
18	28 July 2018	19:00	Kashima Antlers	H	1-1	Yonekura 70'	28,534	16th
19	1 August 2018	19:00	Júbilo Iwata	A	1-1	Hwang 82'	13,015	16th
20	5 August 2018	18:00	Nagoya Grampus	A	2-3	Ademilson (pen.) 22', Fujimoto 37'	22,615	17th
21	10 August 2018	19:00	FC Tokyo	H	2-1	Fábio 34', Ademilson 90+5'	24,879	17th
22	15 August 2018	19:00	Consadole Sapporo	H	1-1	Kurata (pen.) 18'	21,203	18th
23	19 August 2018	19:00	Vegalta Sendai	A	1-2	Watanabe 27'	16,110	17th
24	26 August 2018	19:00	Sagan Tosu	A	0-3		20,060	17th
25	1 September 2018	19:00	Kawasaki Frontale	H	2-0	Watanabe 7', Fábio 55'	19,683	17th
26	15 September 2018	19:00	Vissel Kobe	A	2-1	Kurata 52', Hwang 68'	25,485	17th
27	21 September 2018	19:30	Shimizu S-Pulse	A	2-1	Hwang 1', 26'	14,790	17th
28	29 September 2018	16:00	Sanfrecce Hiroshima	H	1-0	Hwang 84'	34,660	13th
29	6 October 2018	14:00	Cerezo Osaka	A	1-0	Ademilson 45'	34,303	12th
30	20 October 2018	15:00	Yokohama F. Marinos	H	2-1	Hwang 71', Onose 86'	26,630	10th
31	3 November 2018	16:00	Urawa Red Diamonds	A	3-1	Onose 42', Hwang 62', Ademilson 69'	43,943	9th
32	10 November 2018	15:00	Shonan Bellmare	H	1-0	Hwang 60'	23,576	9th
33	24 November 2018	14:00	V-Varen Nagasaki	H	2-1	Onose 10', Nakamura 52'	27,806	8th
34	1 December 2018	14:00	Kashiwa Reysol	A	2-4	Watanabe 28, Ademilson 79'	13,067	9th

* = all times Japan Standard Time.

=== Match Day Line-Ups ===
The following players appeared for Gamba Osaka during the 2018 J1 League:

Player Appearances – 2018 J1 League
Round	Opponent	GK	RB	LB	CB	CB	CM	CM	ACM	RW	LW	CF	Substituted on	Substituted on	Substituted on
1	Nagoya Grampus	Higashiguchi	Oh	Fujiharu	Miura	Fábio	Fukuda (substituted off)	Ichimaru	Endō (substituted off)	Hwang (substituted off)	Kurata	Nagasawa	Yajima	Nakamura	Izumisawa
2	Kashima Antlers	Higashiguchi	Yonekura	Fujiharu	Miura	Fábio	Yajima (substituted off)	Ichimaru	Endō (substituted off)	Hwang (substituted off)	Kurata	Nagasawa (substituted off)	Ide	Fukuda	Nakamura
3	Kawasaki Frontale	Higashiguchi	Yonekura	Fujiharu	Miura	Fábio	Endō	Ichimaru	Ide (substituted off)	Nakamura (substituted off)	Ademilson	Nagasawa (substituted off)	Hwang	Fukuda	Izumisawa
4	Kashiwa Reysol	Higashiguchi	Oh	Fujiharu (substituted off)	Miura	Fábio	Konno	Ichimaru (substituted off)	Endō	Hwang	Izumisawa (substituted off)	Nagasawa	Hatsuse	Ide	Nakamura
5	FC Tokyo	Higashiguchi	Oh	Fujiharu (substituted off)	Miura	Fábio	Endō	Matheus	Kurata (substituted off)	Hwang	Ide	Nagasawa (substituted off)	Hatsuse	Mori	Nakamura
6	Vissel Kobe	Higashiguchi	Oh (substituted off)	Hatsuse	Miura	Fábio	Endō	Matheus	Kurata (substituted off)	Hwang	Meshino	Nagasawa	Yonekura	Fujimoto	
7	Júbilo Iwata	Higashiguchi	Yonekura	Hatsuse	Miura	Fábio	Endō	Matheus	Kurata (substituted off)	Hwang	Meshino (substituted off)	Nagasawa (substituted off)	Ide	Fujimoto	Nakamura
8	V-Varen Nagasaki	Higashiguchi	Yonekura (substituted off)	Hatsuse	Miura	Fábio	Endō	Matheus	Kurata (substituted off)	Fujimoto	Meshino (substituted off)	Hwang	Oh	Ide	Nakamura
9	Cerezo Osaka	Higashiguchi (substituted off)	Oh	Fujiharu	Miura	Fábio	Takae	Matheus	Endō (substituted off)	Fujimoto (substituted off)	Kurata	Hwang	Yonekura	Hayashi	Nakamura
10	Shonan Bellmare	Hayashi	Oh (substituted off)	Fujiharu	Miura	Suganuma	Takae (substituted off)	Matheus	Endō	Fujimoto (substituted off)	Kurata	Hwang	Yonekura	Nakamura	Meshino
11	Sagan Tosu	Hayashi	Oh	Fujiharu	Miura	Fábio	Endō	Matheus	Fujimoto (substituted off)	Yonekura (substituted off)	Kurata	Hwang	Nakamura	Meshino	
12	Vegalta Sendai	Hayashi	Oh (substituted off)	Fujiharu	Miura	Fábio	Endō (substituted off)	Matheus	Fujimoto	Yonekura	Kurata	Hwang (substituted off)	Konno	Nakamura	Meshino
13	Consadole Sapporo	Hayashi	Yonekura (substituted off)	Fujiharu	Miura	Fábio	Konno (substituted off)	Matheus	Endō	Fujimoto	Kurata	Hwang (substituted off)	Nagasawa	Oh	Nakamura
14	Yokohama F. Marinos	Higashiguchi	Oh	Fujiharu	Miura	Suganuma	Fábio	Matheus	Konno (substituted off)	Hwang (substituted off)	Endō	Nagasawa (substituted off)	Kurata	Fujimoto	Nakamura
15	Urawa Red Diamonds	Higashiguchi	Yonekura	Fujiharu	Miura	Fábio	Endō	Matheus	Kurata	Hwang (substituted off)	Fujimoto	Nagasawa	Meshino		
Round	Opponent	GK	RB	LB	CB	CB	CM	CM	CM	ACM	CF	CF	Substituted on	Substituted on	Substituted on
16	Sanfrecce Hiroshima	Higashiguchi	Yonekura	Hatsuse	Miura	Fábio	Takae	Endō	Matheus	Kurata (substituted off)	Hwang (substituted off)	Ademilson (substituted off)	Suganuma	Nakamura	Meshino
17	Shimizu S-Pulse	Higashiguchi	Yonekura	Hatsuse	Miura	Suganuma	Takae (substituted off)	Endō	Matheus	Kurata (substituted off)	Hwang	Ademilson (substituted off)	Nagasawa	Fujimoto	Meshino
Round	Opponent	GK	RB	LB	CB	CB	CM	CM	RM	LM	CF	CF	Substituted on	Substituted on	Substituted on
18	Kashima Antlers	Higashiguchi	Oh	Hatsuse	Miura	Fábio	Ko	Endō	Yonekura (substituted off)	Kurata (substituted off)	Hwang (substituted off)	Ademilson	Nagasawa	Fujimoto	Meshino
19	Júbilo Iwata	Higashiguchi	Oh	Hatsuse	Miura	Fábio	Ko	Takae (substituted off)	Fujimoto (substituted off)	Kurata	Hwang	Nagasawa (substituted off)	Endō	Ademilson	Yonekura
20	Nagoya Grampus	Higashiguchi	Yonekura	Oh	Miura	Fábio	Ko	Endō	Fujimoto (substituted off)	Kurata (substituted off)	Hwang (substituted off)	Ademilson	Nagasawa	Ide	Onose
21	FC Tokyo	Higashiguchi	Miura	Oh	Suganuma	Fábio	Ko	Endō	Fujimoto (substituted off)	Kurata (substituted off)	Ichimi (substituted off)	Ademilson	Yonekura	Takae	Onose
22	Consadole Sapporo	Higashiguchi	Miura	Oh	Suganuma	Fábio	Ko	Endō (substituted off)	Fujimoto (substituted off)	Kurata	Ichimi (substituted off)	Ademilson	Fujiharu	Yonekura	Takae
23	Vegalta Sendai	Higashiguchi	Miura	Oh (substituted off)	Suganuma	Fábio	Ko	Endō (substituted off)	Onose (substituted off)	Kurata	Watanabe	Ademilson	Fujiharu	Fujimoto	Meshino
24	Sagan Tosu	Higashiguchi	Yonekura	Fujiharu	Miura	Suganuma	Ko (substituted off)	Endō	Fujimoto (substituted off)	Kurata	Watanabe (substituted off)	Ademilson	Ichimi	Takae	Onose
Round	Opponent	GK	RB	LB	CB	CB	CB	CM	CM	RW	LW	CF	Substituted on	Substituted on	Substituted on
25	Kawasaki Frontale	Higashiguchi	Oh (substituted off)	Fujiharu	Miura	Fábio	Suganuma	Endō	Konno	Kurata (substituted off)	Onose (substituted off)	Watanabe	Yonekura	Ichimi	Ko
Round	Opponent	GK	CB	CB	CB	RWB	LWB	CM	CM	ACM	CF	CF	Substituted on	Substituted on	Substituted on
26	Vissel Kobe	Higashiguchi	Konno (substituted off)	Fábio	Miura	Onose (substituted off)	Fujiharu	Endō	Takae (substituted off)	Kurata	Watanabe	Hwang (substituted off)	Ichimi	Oh	Ko
Round	Opponent	GK	RB	LB	CB	CB	CM	CM	RW	LW	CF	CF	Substituted on	Substituted on	Substituted on
27	Shimizu S-Pulse	Higashiguchi	Oh	Fujiharu	Miura	Fábio	Endō (substituted off)	Konno	Onose (substituted off)	Kurata (substituted off)	Watanabe	Hwang	Suganuma	Yonekura	Ko
28	Sanfrecce Hiroshima	Higashiguchi	Oh	Fujiharu	Miura	Fábio	Endō	Konno	Onose (substituted off)	Kurata (substituted off)	Watanabe	Hwang (substituted off)	Ademilson	Yonekura	Fujimoto
29	Cerezo Osaka	Higashiguchi	Oh	Fujiharu (substituted off)	Miura	Fábio	Endō	Konno	Onose	Kurata (substituted off)	Watanabe	Ademilson (substituted off)	Yonekura	Ichimi	Ko
Round	Opponent	GK	CB	CB	CB	RWB	LWB	CM	CM	RW	LW	CF	Substituted on	Substituted on	Substituted on
30	Yokohama F. Marinos	Higashiguchi (substituted off)	Miura	Fábio	Suganuma (substituted off)	Oh	Fujiharu	Endō	Konno	Onose	Kurata	Watanabe (substituted off)	Ademilson	Hwang	Hayashi
Round	Opponent	GK	RB	LB	CB	CB	CM	CM	RW	LW	CF	CF	Substituted on	Substituted on	Substituted on
31	Urawa Red Diamonds	Hayashi	Oh	Fujiharu	Miura	Fábio	Endō	Konno	Onose (substituted off)	Kurata	Ademilson (substituted off)	Hwang (substituted off)	Ichimi	Nakamura	Watanabe
32	Shonan Bellmare	Higashiguchi	Yonekura (substituted off)	Fujiharu	Miura	Fábio	Endō	Konno	Onose	Kurata (substituted off)	Ademilson	Hwang (substituted off)	Hatsuse	Ichimi	Watanabe
33	V-Varen Nagasaki	Higashiguchi	Yonekura	Fujiharu	Miura	Fábio	Endō (substituted off)	Konno	Onose (substituted off)	Nakamura	Watanabe (substituted off)	Hwang	Ademilson	Fujimoto	Ko
34	Kashiwa Reysol	Higashiguchi	Yonekura (substituted off)	Fujiharu	Miura	Fábio	Endō (substituted off)	Konno	Onose	Kurata	Watanabe (substituted off)	Ademilson	Ichimi	Fujimoto	Nakamura

(substituted on) = Substitute on, (substituted off) = Substitute Off, = Number of goals scored, = Yellow Card and = Red Card.

== Emperor's Cup ==
Gamba entered the 2018 Emperor's Cup at the 2nd round stage where they were drawn at home to Kwansei Gakuin University on 6 June. The match ended in an embarrassing 2–1 defeat after extra time.

Round	Date	Time*	Opponents	H / A	Result F-A	Scorers	Attendance
2nd round	6 June 2018	19:00	Kwansei Gakuin University	H	1-2 aet	Miura 89'	3,103

=== Match Day Line-Ups ===
Player Appearances – 2018 Emperor's Cup
Round	Opponent	GK	RB	LB	CB	CB	CM	CM	RM	LM	CF	CF	Substituted on	Substituted on	Substituted on	Substituted on
2	Kwansei Gakuin	Hayashi	Oh	Fujiharu	Miura	Fábio	Endō	Matheus	Kurata (substituted off)	Fujimoto (substituted off)	Hwang (substituted off)	Nagasawa (substituted off)	Senoo	Mori	Nakamura	Meshino

(substituted on) = Substitute on, (substituted off) = Substitute Off, = Number of goals scored, = Yellow Card and = Red Card.

== J.League Cup Results ==
Having failing to qualify for the 2018 Asian Champions League, Gamba joined the J.League Cup at the group stage for the first time since 2014 when they went on to win the competition. The format was rejigged prior to the season with groups of 7 being replaced with groups of 4. Gamba were drawn in Group C along with Urawa Reds, Sanfrecce Hiroshima and Nagoya Grampus playing each team home and away.

Despite losing all three home group stage games, including two 4-1 reverses, Gamba qualified for the playoff round by virtue of 3 wins on the road and were paired with Júbilo Iwata. Home and away victories secured a passage to the quarter-finals where they faced off against Yokohama F. Marinos. A 4-0 hammering in the home leg was followed by a 3–1 defeat in Yokohama to send Gamba crashing out 7–1 on aggregate.

Round	Date	Time*	Opponents	H / A	Result F–A	Scorers	Attendance
1	7 March 2018	19:00	Sanfrecce Hiroshima	H	0-4		10,058
2	14 March 2018	19:30	Urawa Red Diamonds	A	4-1	Hwang 10', Nagasawa 41', 54', Nakamura 87'	21,897
3	4 April 2018	19:00	Nagoya Grampus	A	4-1	Nagasawa 5', 16', 29', 41'	10,122
4	18 April 2018	19:00	Urawa Red Diamonds	H	0-1		9,516
5	9 May 2018	19:00	Sanfrecce Hiroshima	A	3-2	Meshino 52', Senoo 65', Nishino 70'	7,083
6	16 May 2018	19:00	Nagoya Grampus	H	1-4	Nagasawa 20'	9,907
Playoff	2 June 2018	16:00	Júbilo Iwata	H	1-0	Hwang 7'	8,519
Playoff	9 June 2018	16:00	Júbilo Iwata	A	3-2	Hwang 26', 50', 66'	10,518
QF	5 September 2018	19:00	Yokohama F. Marinos	H	0-4		5,792
QF	9 September 2018	19:00	Yokohama F. Marinos	A	1-3	Ichimi 52'	11,207

* = all times Japan Standard Time.

=== Match Day Line-Ups ===
Player Appearances – 2018 J.League Cup
Round	Opponent	GK	RB	LB	CB	CB	CM	CM	ACM	RW	LW	CF	Substituted on	Substituted on	Substituted on
1	Sanfrecce Hiroshima	Higashiguchi	Yonekura	Fujiharu	Miura	Fábio	Fukuda	Ichimaru	Endō (substituted off)	Hwang	Kurata (substituted off)	Ademilson (substituted off)	Nagasawa	Yajima	Nakamura
2	Urawa Red Diamonds	Higashiguchi	Oh	Fujiharu	Miura	Fábio	Endō	Ichimaru	Izumisawa (substituted off)	Ademilson (substituted off)	Hwang (substituted off)	Nagasawa	Hatsuse	Yonekura	Nakamura
3	Nagoya Grampus	Higashiguchi	Oh	Hatsuse	Miura	Fábio	Endō (substituted off)	Matheus	Kurata	Hwang (substituted off)	Ide (substituted off)	Nagasawa	Yajima	Fujimoto	Mori
4	Urawa Red Diamonds	Hayashi	Yonekura	Oh	Suganuma	Nishino	Ichimaru	Takae	Ide (substituted off)	Fujimoto (substituted off)	Izumisawa (substituted off)	Nakamura	Takagi	Fukuda	Meshino
5	Sanfrecce Hiroshima	Tani	Oh (substituted off)	Hatsuse	Suganuma	Nishino	Ichimaru	Takae	Nakamura	Izumisawa (substituted off)	Meshino	Nagasawa (substituted off)	Senoo	Mori	
6	Nagoya Grampus	Hayashi	Yonekura	Hatsuse	Miura	Suganuma	Takae	Matheus	Kurata (substituted off)	Fujimoto (substituted off)	Hwang (substituted off)	Nagasawa	Mori	Nakamura	Meshino
		GK	RB	LB	CB	CB	CM	CM	RW	LW	CF	CF	Substituted on	Substituted on	Substituted on
Playoff	Júbilo Iwata	Hayashi	Yonekura (substituted off)	Fujiharu	Miura	Fábio	Endō	Matheus	Fujimoto (substituted off)	Kurata	Hwang	Nagasawa (substituted off)	Oh	Takae	Meshino
Playoff	Júbilo Iwata	Hayashi	Oh	Fujiharu	Miura	Fábio	Endō	Matheus	Fujimoto (substituted off)	Kurata	Hwang (substituted off)	Nagasawa (substituted off)	Mori	Takae	Meshino
QF	Yokohama F. Marinos	Hayashi	Yonekura	Hatsuse	Noda	Suganuma	Ko	Ichimaru (substituted off)	Fujimoto (substituted off)	Ide (substituted off)	Ademilson	Ichimi	Takae	Nakamura	Onose
		GK	RB	LB	CB	CB	CB	CM	CM	RW	LW	CF	Substituted on	Substituted on	Substituted on
QF	Yokohama F. Marinos	Suzuki	Oh (substituted off)	Fujiharu	Noda	Fábio	Suganuma	Endō	Konno (substituted off)	Ademilson (substituted off)	Kurata	Ichimi	Takae	Nakamura	Onose

(substituted on) = Substitute on, (substituted off) = Substitute Off, = Number of goals scored, = Yellow Card and = Red Card.

== Squad statistics ==
No.	Pos.	Name	J1 League		Emperor's Cup		J.League Cup		Total		Discipline	
No.	Pos.	Name	Apps	Goals	Apps	Goals	Apps	Goals	Apps	Goals	Yellow card	Red card
1	GK	(Japan) Masaaki Higashiguchi	29	0	0	0	3	0	32	0	2	0
2	DF	(Japan) Takaharu Nishino	0	0	0	0	2	1	2	1	1	0
3	DF	(Brazil) Fábio	31	3	1	0	6	0	38	3	5	1
4	DF	(Japan) Hiroki Fujiharu	23(2)	0	1	0	5	0	29(2)	0	1	0
5	DF	(Japan) Genta Miura (c)	34	0	1	1	6	0	41	1	2	0
6	DF	(Japan) Ryo Hatsuse	7(3)	0	0	0	4(1)	0	11(4)	0	2	0
7	MF	(Japan) Yasuhito Endō	33(1)	1	1	0	6	0	40(1)	1	2	0
8	MF	(Brazil) Matheus Jesus	13	1	1	0	4	0	18	1	3	0
9	FW	(Brazil) Ademilson	13(4)	5	0	0	4	0	17(4)	5	0	0
10	MF	(Japan) Shu Kurata	30(1)	4	1	0	6	0	37(1)	4	6	0
11	FW	(South Korea) Hwang Ui-jo	25(2)	16	1	0	6	5	32(2)	21	5	0
13	DF	(Japan) Shunya Suganuma	9(2)	0	0	0	5	0	14(2)	0	4	0
14	DF	(Japan) Koki Yonekura	16(10)	1	0	0	5(1)	0	21(11)	1	1	1
15	MF	(Japan) Yasuyuki Konno	13(1)	0	0	0	1	0	14(1)	0	3	0
16	DF	(Japan) Hiroki Noda	0	0	0	0	2	0	2	0	0	0
17	MF	(Japan) Mizuki Ichimaru	4	0	0	0	5	0	9	0	2	0
18	FW	(Japan) Akito Takagi	0	0	0	0	0(1)	0	0(1)	0	0	0
19	FW	(Japan) Kazunari Ichimi	2(7)	0	0	0	2	0	4(7)	1	0	0
20	FW	(Japan) Shun Nagasawa	10(4)	1	1	0	6(1)	7	17(5)	8	1	0
21	MF	(Japan) Shinya Yajima	1(1)	0	0	0	0(2)	0	1(3)	0	0	0
22	DF	(South Korea) Oh Jae-suk	21(3)	0	1	0	6(1)	0	28(4)	0	4	0
23	GK	(Japan) Mizuki Hayashi	5(2)	0	1	0	5	0	11(2)	0	1	0
24	MF	(Japan) Haruya Ide	2(5)	0	0	0	3	0	5(5)	0	0	0
25	MF	(Japan) Jungo Fujimoto	12(9)	2	1	0	5(1)	0	18(10)	2	2	0
26	MF	(Japan) Naoya Senoo	0	0	0(1)	0	0(1)	1	0(2)	1	0	0
27	MF	(Japan) Yuto Mori	0(1)	0	0(1)	0	0(4)	0	0(6)	0	1	0
28	MF	(Japan) Takahiro Ko	7(5)	0	0	0	1	0	8(5)	0	2	0
29	MF	(Japan) Leo Takae	6(3)	0	0	0	3(4)	0	9(7)	0	3	0
31	GK	(Japan) Ryota Suzuki	0	0	0	0	1	0	1	0	0	0
32	MF	(Japan) Ren Shibamoto	0	0	0	0	0	0	0	0	0	0
34	MF	(Japan) Yuya Fukuda	1(2)	0	0	0	1(1)	0	2(3)	0	0	0
35	DF	(Japan) Tatsuya Yamaguchi	0	0	0	0	0	0	0	0	0	0
36	DF	(Japan) Riku Matsuda	0	0	0	0	0	0	0	0	0	0
37	FW	(Japan) Haruto Shirai	0	0	0	0	0	0	0	0	0	0
38	FW	(Japan) Keito Nakamura	2(15)	1	0(1)	0	2(5)	1	4(21)	2	1	0
39	MF	(Japan) Jin Izumisawa	1(2)	0	0	0	3	0	4(2)	0	0	0
39	FW	(Japan) Kazuma Watanabe	10(2)	3	0	0	0	0	10(2)	3	0	0
40	FW	(Japan) Ryotaro Meshino	3(8)	0	0(1)	0	1(4)	1	4(13)	1	2	0
41	GK	(Japan) Kosei Tani	0	0	0	0	1	0	1	0	0	0
50	MF	(Japan) Kosuke Onose	11(3)	3	0	0	0(2)	0	11(5)	3	0	0
—	—	Own goals	–	1	–	0	–	0	–	1	–	–

Statistics accurate as of match played on 1 December 2018

=== Goalscorers ===
As of 1 December 2018

Rank	Position	Name	J1 League	Emperor's Cup	J.League Cup	Total
1	FW	(South Korea) Hwang Ui-jo	16	0	5	21
2	FW	(Japan) Shun Nagasawa	1	0	7	8
3	FW	(Brazil) Ademilson	5	0	0	5
4	MF	(Japan) Shu Kurata	4	0	0	4
5	DF	(Brazil) Fábio Aguiar	3	0	0	3
5	MF	(Japan) Kosuke Onose	3	0	0	3
5	FW	(Japan) Kazuma Watanabe	3	0	0	3
8	MF	(Japan) Jungo Fujimoto	2	0	0	2
8	FW	(Japan) Keito Nakamura	1	0	1	2
10	MF	(Japan) Yasuhito Endō	1	0	0	1
10	FW	(Japan) Kazunari Ichimi	0	0	1	1
10	MF	(Brazil) Matheus Jesus	1	0	0	1
10	FW	(Japan) Ryotaro Meshino	0	0	1	1
10	DF	(Japan) Genta Miura	0	1	0	1
10	DF	(Japan) Takaharu Nishino	0	0	1	1
10	MF	(Japan) Naoya Senoo	0	0	1	1
10	DF	(Japan) Koki Yonekura	1	0	0	1
Total			41	1	17	59

=== Assists ===
As of 1 December 2018

Rank	Position	Name	J1 League	Emperor's Cup	J.League Cup	Total
1	MF	(Japan) Yasuhito Endō	7	0	0	7
2	MF	(Japan) Shu Kurata	4	0	2	6
3	MF	(Japan) Jin Izumisawa	1	0	3	4
4	MF	(Japan) Jungo Fujimoto	2	0	1	3
4	DF	(South Korea) Oh Jae-suk	2	0	1	3
4	MF	(Japan) Kosuke Onose	3	0	0	3
7	FW	(Brazil) Ademilson	2	0	0	2
7	DF	(Japan) Hiroki Fujiharu	2	0	0	2
7	DF	(Japan) Ryo Hatsuse	1	0	1	2
7	FW	(South Korea) Hwang Ui-jo	1	0	1	2
7	MF	(Japan) Takahiro Ko	2	0	0	2
7	FW	(Japan) Keito Nakamura	2	0	0	2
13	MF	(Japan) Yasuyuki Konno	1	0	0	1
13	FW	(Japan) Shun Nagasawa	0	0	1	1
13	DF	(Japan) Shunya Suganuma	0	0	1	1
13	MF	(Japan) Leo Takae	0	0	1	1
13	DF	(Japan) Koki Yonekura	1	0	0	1
Total			31	0	11	42

== Gamba Osaka Under-23 ==
Gamba Osaka's Under-23 side compete in the J3 League where they are allowed to name 3 overage players of which one must be a goalkeeper. On January 24, their fixtures for the 2018 J3 League season were announced. Due to there being only 17 teams in the league, rounds 17 and 22 were bye rounds while the round 8 fixture against FC Tokyo Under-23 was played at a later date so as to fall on a national holiday. The round 15 game against Thespakusatsu Gunma was postponed until August due to a large earthquake that occurred in Osaka in late June.

Round	Date	Time*	Opponents	H / A	Result F–A	Scorers	Attendance	League position
1	11 March 2018	14:00	Grulla Morioka	H	3-2	Meshino 66', 89', Ichimi 79'	1,330	3rd
2	17 March 2018	13:00	Kagoshima United FC	A	1-4	Suganuma 19'	2,223	11th
3	21 March 2018	14:00	Blaublitz Akita	H	2-1	Fukuda 15', Ichimi 79'	1,224	4th
4	25 March 2018	13:00	YSCC Yokohama	A	0-0		1,509	5th
5	1 April 2018	14:00	Fujieda MYFC	H	4-1	Ichimi 24', Meshino 26', 77', Ko 80'	1,398	4th
6	8 April 2018	13:00	Kataller Toyama	A	0-3		1,704	5th
7	15 April 2018	14:00	AC Nagano Parceiro	H	1-1	Ide 36'	1,575	6th
9	3 May 2018	18:00	FC Ryukyu	A	1-2	Takagi 89'	1,824	9th
10	6 May 2018	14:00	Azul Claro Numazu	H	3-0	Takagi 63', Senoo 70', Ichimi 88'	1,254	9th
11	20 May 2018	14:00	Giravanz Kitakyushu	A	4-0	Izumisawa 31', Senoo 63', Ko 70', Shirai 88'	4,363	5th
8	26 May 2018	14:00	FC Tokyo U-23	H	2-4	Izumisawa 36', Nakamura 77'	1,596	5th
12	2 June 2018	14:00	Cerezo Osaka U-23	A	1-1	Shirai 75'	4,551	5th
13	10 June 2018	16:00	Fukushima United FC	H	1-1	Ichimi (pen) 90+4'	974	7th
14	16 June 2018	17:00	Gainare Tottori	A	0-1		2,456	7th
16	30 June 2018	17:00	SC Sagamihara	A	3-2	Own goal 18', Ko 32', Mori 50'	3,256	5th
18	16 July 2018	17:30	Kagoshima United FC	H	0-0		1,054	7th
19	22 July 2018	15:00	Grulla Morioka	A	1-2	Ide 82'	3,115	11th
15	18 August 2018	17:00	Thespakusatsu Gunma*	H	4-0	Nakamura 16', Senoo 25', Nishino 56', Fukuda 71'	1,050	6th
20	26 August 2018	19:00	YSCC Yokohama	H	3-0	Konno 3', Takagi 33', Ide 78'	568	4th
21	2 September 2018	19:00	Thespakusatsu Gunma	A	0-1		3,358	8th
23	15 September 2018	18:00	FC Ryukyu	H	2-0	Takagi 45', Meshino 67'	804	5th
24	23 September 2018	13:00	Blaublitz Akita	A	1-1	Senoo 65'	3,418	7th
25	30 September 2018	13:00	FC Tokyo U-23	A	2-2	Nakamura 6', Shibamoto 60'	1,178	7th
26	7 October 2018	14:00	Gainare Tottori	H	2-0	Ichimi 3', Ide 71'	1,778	5th
27	13 October 2018	13:00	Fujieda MYFC	A	1-2	Mori 31'	945	6th
28	21 October 2018	13:00	Azul Claro Numazu	A	2-1	Ide 60', Nakamura 77'	4,041	5th
29	28 October 2018	14:00	SC Sagamihara	H	2-1	Fukuda 33', Ichimi 60'	1,310	5th
30	4 November 2018	14:00	Kataller Toyama	H	1-1	Nishino 66'	1,105	5th
31	11 November 2018	13:00	Nagano Parceiro	A	1-2	Senoo 75'	2,828	5th
32	18 November 2018	13:05	Fukushima United FC	A	3-4	Shibamoto 68', Senoo 80', Shirai 90+3'	1,055	6th
33	25 November 2018	14:00	Giravanz Kitakyushu	H	2-1	Ichimi 50', Takagi 90+1'	1,334	6th
34	2 December 2018	13:00	Cerezo Osaka U-23	H	0-2		3,753	6th

* = all times Japan Standard Time.

== U-23 Squad statistics ==
No.	Pos.	Name	J3 League		Discipline	
No.	Pos.	Name	Apps	Goals	Yellow card	Red card
2	DF	(Japan) Takaharu Nishino	25	2	4	0
6	DF	(Japan) Ryo Hatsuse	10	0	1	0
13	DF	(Japan) Shunya Suganuma	5	1	1	0
14	DF	(Japan) Koki Yonekura	1	0	0	0
15	MF	(Japan) Yasuyuki Konno	1	1	0	0
16	DF	(Japan) Hiroki Noda	25(1)	0	2	0
17	MF	(Japan) Mizuki Ichimaru	18(2)	0	7	1
18	FW	(Japan) Akito Takagi	27(5)	5	0	0
19	FW	(Japan) Kazunari Ichimi	21	8	3	0
21	MF	(Japan) Shinya Yajima	9	0	0	0
23	GK	(Japan) Mizuki Hayashi	4	0	0	0
24	MF	(Japan) Haruya Ide	14(2)	5	2	0
26	MF	(Japan) Naoya Senoo	15(12)	6	2	1
27	MF	(Japan) Yuto Mori	11(11)	2	3	0
28	MF	(Japan) Takahiro Ko	20	3	4	0
29	MF	(Japan) Leo Takae	15(1)	0	4	1
31	GK	(Japan) Ryota Suzuki	11	0	0	0
32	MF	(Japan) Ren Shibamoto	13(9)	2	0	0
34	MF	(Japan) Yuya Fukuda	8(14)	3	0	0
35	DF	(Japan) Tatsuya Yamaguchi	29(2)	0	3	0
36	DF	(Japan) Riku Matsuda	23(1)	0	2	0
37	FW	(Japan) Haruto Shirai	1(20)	3	1	0
38	FW	(Japan) Keito Nakamura	10(5)	4	0	0
39	MF	(Japan) Jin Izumisawa	7(1)	2	0	0
40	FW	(Japan) Ryotaro Meshino	12(3)	5	0	0
41	GK	(Japan) Kosei Tani	17	0	0	0
42	GK	(Japan) Yukihiro Komai	0	0	0	0
43	MF	(Japan) Tsubasa Adachi	0(1)	0	0	0
44	MF	(Japan) Sho Iwamoto	0	0	0	0
45	DF	(Japan) Tetta Kawai	0	0	0	0
46	MF	(Japan) Kohei Okuno	0(2)	0	0	0
47	DF	(Japan) Sho Nishimura	0	0	0	0
48	MF	(Japan) Naoya Takahashi	0	0	0	0
—	—	Own goals	–	0	–	–

Statistics accurate as of match played on 2 December 2018
