= Kōsei Tani =

Japanese footballer

Kōsei Tani 谷 晃生
Personal information
- Full name: Kōsei Tani
- Date of birth: 22 November 2000 (age 25)
- Place of birth: Osaka, Japan
- Height: 1.87 m (6 ft 1 1/2 in)
- Position: Goalkeeper

Team information
- Current team: Machida Zelvia
- Number: 1

Youth career
- –2012: TSK Senboku SC
- 2013–2017: Gamba Osaka

Senior career*
Years	Team	Apps	(Gls)
2017–2019	Gamba Osaka U23	33	(0)
2018–	Gamba Osaka	10	(0)
2020–2022	→ Shonan Bellmare (loan)	90	(0)
2023–2024	→ Dender (loan)	1	(0)
2024	→ Machida Zelvia (loan)	37	(0)
2025–	Machida Zelvia	58	(0)

International career^{‡}
2015	Japan U15	11	(0)
2016	Japan U16	11	(0)
2017	Japan U17	12	(0)
2018	Japan U19	3	(0)
2021–	Japan U23	10	(0)
2022–2025	Japan	3	(0)
Medal record
Men's football
Representing Japan
Men's football
EAFF Championship
Winner	2022 Japan	Team
AFC U-19 Championship
Bronze medal – third place	2018 Indonesia
- * Club domestic league appearances and goals as of 9 August 2026 ‡ National team caps and goals as of 5 June 2025, 12:22 (UTC)

Kōsei Tani (谷 晃生, Tani Kōsei; born 22 November 2000) is a Japanese professional footballer who plays as a goalkeeper for J1 League club Machida Zelvia.

== Club career ==
=== Gamba Osaka ===
Born and raised in Osaka, Tani came through the youth ranks at Gamba Osaka and was promoted to the first team ahead of the 2018 season. He made his top team debut in a J.League Cup match away to Sanfrecce Hiroshima on 9 May 2018. Gamba recovered from a 2-0 half-time deficit to run out 3-2 winners.

Prior to joining Gamba's J1 team, Tani played 4 times for Gamba Osaka U23 which compete in the J3 League in the 2017 season. Following his elevation to the club's first-team squad, he earned more playing time at J3 level appearing 17 times as part of a rotation system with Ryota Suzuki.

==== Dender (loan) ====
On 1 August 2023, Tani signed with Belgium 2nd division club, FCV Dender, on a season-long loan transfer.

=== Machida Zelvia ===
On 12 January 2024, Tani officially joined newly-promoted J1 League club Machida Zelvia, on a loan transfer for the 2024 season until 31 January 2025.

On 4 January 2025, Tani officially signed a permanent transfer to Machida Zelvia for 2025 season. During the 2025–26 AFC Champions League Elite, he was named Best Goalkeeper after recording seven clean sheets, as his club reached the final, where they were defeated 1–0 after extra time by Al-Ahli.

== International career ==
=== Youth ===
Tani played for Japan in the 2017 FIFA U-17 World Cup, appearing in 7 games.

=== Senior ===
On 27 July 2022, Tani made his debut for the Japan national team, playing the full match in a 3–0 win over South Korea during the 2022 EAFF E-1 Football Championship.

== Career statistics ==
=== Club ===
As of the start for 2025 season.

Club	Season	League			Cup		League Cup		Continental		Other		Total	
Club	Season	Division	Apps	Goals	Apps	Goals	Apps	Goals	Apps	Goals	Apps	Goals	Apps	Goals
Gamba Osaka	2018	J1 League	0	0	0	0	1	0	—		—		1	0
Gamba Osaka	2023	J1 League	10	0	1	0	2	0	—		—		13	0
Gamba Osaka	Total		10	0	1	0	3	0	—		—		14	0
Shonan Bellmare (loan)	2020	J1 League	25	0	—		0	0	—		—		25	0
Shonan Bellmare (loan)	2021	J1 League	34	0	0	0	0	0	—		—		34	0
Shonan Bellmare (loan)	2022	J1 League	31	0	0	0	4	0	—		—		35	0
Shonan Bellmare (loan)	Total		90	0	0	0	4	0	—		—		94	0
Dender (loan)	2023–24	Challenger Pro League	1	0	1	0	—		—		—		2	0
Machida Zelvia (loan)	2024	J1 League	37	0	—		1	0	—		—		38	0
Machida Zelvia	2025	J1 League	0	0	0	0	0	0	0	0	—		0	0
Machida Zelvia	Total		37	0	0	0	1	0	0	0	—		38	0
Career total			138	0	2	0	8	0	0	0	0	0	148	0

== Reserves performance ==
Last Updated: 2 December 2018

Club performance			League		Total	
Season	Club	League	Apps	Goals	Apps	Goals
Japan			League		Total	
2017	Gamba Osaka U-23	J3	4	0	4	0
2018	Gamba Osaka U-23	J3	17	0	17	0
Career total			21	0	21	0

== Honours ==
=== Club ===
Machida Zelvia

- Emperor's Cup: 2025
- AFC Champions League Elite : 2025–26 Runners-up

=== International ===
- EAFF E-1 Football Championship: 2022

=== Individual ===
- AFC Champions League Elite Best Goalkeeper: 2025–26
