= Ren Shibamoto =

Japanese footballer (born 1999)

Ren Shibamoto 芝本 蓮
Personal information
- Date of birth: 22 July 1999 (age 27)
- Place of birth: Minoh, Japan
- Height: 1.73 m (5 ft 8 in)
- Position: Midfielder

Team information
- Current team: Nara Club (on loan from Tiamo Hirakata)
- Number: 50

Youth career
- TSK Kurio
- Osaka Central FC
- –2019: Gamba Osaka

Senior career*
Years	Team	Apps	(Gls)
2017–2020	Gamba Osaka U-23	105	(6)
2019–2022	Gamba Osaka	1	(0)
2021	→ SC Sagamihara (loan)	6	(0)
2022	→ Fujieda MYFC (loan)	9	(0)
2023–	Tiamo Hirakata	69	(2)
2026–	→ Nara Club (loan)	17	(0)
- * Club domestic league appearances and goals as of 25 August 2026

Ren Shibamoto (芝本 蓮, Shibamoto Ren; born 22 July 1999) is a Japanese professional footballer who plays as Central Midfielder. He currently plays for Nara Club, on loan from Tiamo Hirakata.

== Club career ==
Born on 22 July 1999, in Minoh, Shibamoto joined local side Gamba Osaka as a youth. He was included in the club's under-23 side for the 2017 season, and made his debut on April 15, 2017, coming on as a half time substitute for Takahiro Ko in a 2-0 defeat to Nagano Parceiro. In total he played 29 games and scored 1 goal in 2017 as his side finished 16th out of 17 teams in the final standings.

Shibamoto's performances in J3 didn't go unnoticed, and at age 18, he was given a senior Gamba Osaka contract ahead of the 2018 season. He was handed the number 32 jersey ahead of his debut season, however, owing to his tender years his top team action was limited to 5 outings as an unused substitute, 3 in J1 League and 2 in the J.League Cup.

Gamba operated a new policy for their J3 side in 2018, utilising it as reserve team as opposed to a youth team as it had been run the previous season. This limited Shibamoto's game time and he started just 13 times out of a total of 22 appearances and contributed 2 goals as Gamba U-23 finished 6th in the final standings.

After loan at J3 club, Shibamoto played for SC Sagamihara and Fujieda MYFC for two seasons respectively, he left from the club in 2022 after a once play at Gamba Osaka in top tier.

On 26 January 2023, Shibamoto announcement official transfer to JFL club, Tiamo Hirakata ahead of the 2023 season.

== Career statistics ==
=== Club ===
As of the start of 2023 season.

Club	Season	League			National Cup		League Cup		Total	
Club	Season	Division	Apps	Goals	Apps	Goals	Apps	Goals	Apps	Goals
Gamba Osaka U-23	2017	J3 League	28	1	–		–		28	1
Gamba Osaka U-23	2018	J3 League	22	2	–		–		22	2
Gamba Osaka U-23	2019	J3 League	32	3	–		–		32	3
Gamba Osaka U-23	2020	J3 League	23	0	–		–		23	0
Gamba Osaka U-23	Total		105	6	0	0	0	0	105	6
Gamba Osaka	2019	J1 League	0	0	0	0	1 (Note: Appearances in the J. League Cup)	0	1	0
Gamba Osaka	2020	J1 League	1	0	0	0	1	0	2	0
Gamba Osaka	2021	J1 League	0	0	0	0	0	0	0	0
Gamba Osaka	Total		1	0	0	0	2	0	3	0
SC Sagamihara (loan)	2021	J2 League	6	0	0	0	0	0	6	0
Fujieda MYFC (loan)	2022	J3 League	9	0	0	0	0	0	9	0
Fujieda MYFC (loan)	Total		15	0	0	0	0	0	15	0
Tiamo Hirakata	2023	Japan Football League	0	0	0	0	0	0	0	0
Tiamo Hirakata	Total		0	0	0	0	0	0	0	0
Career total			121	6	0	0	2	0	123	6
