= Yasuyuki Konno =

Japanese footballer (born 1983)

Yasuyuki Konno 今野 泰幸
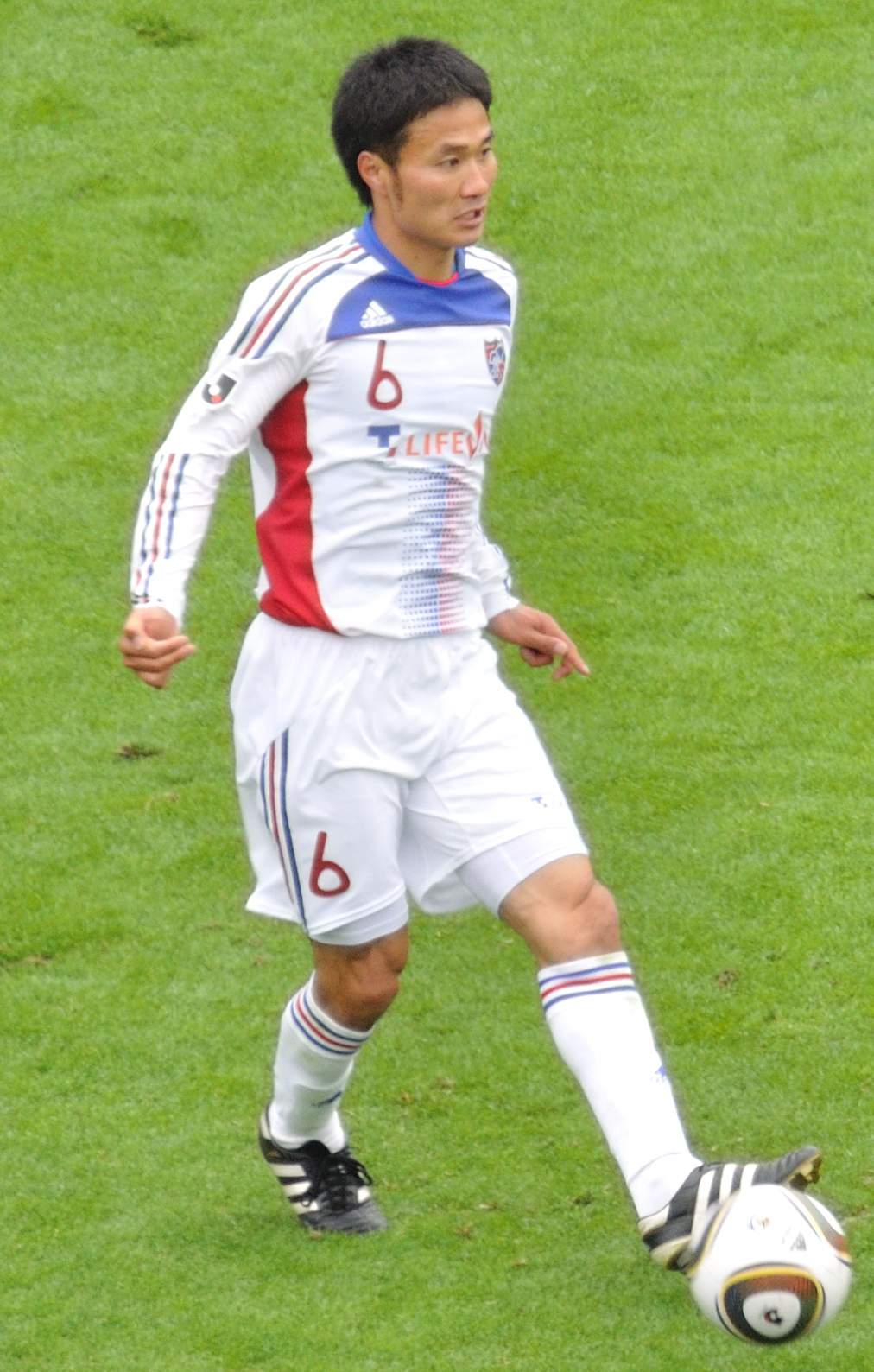
- Konno with FC Tokyo in March 2010

Personal information
- Date of birth: 25 January 1983 (age 43)
- Place of birth: Sendai, Miyagi, Japan
- Height: 1.78 m (5 ft 10 in)
- Positions: Midfielder; defender

Team information
- Current team: Nankatsu SC
- Number: 15

Youth career
- 1998–2000: Tohoku High School

Senior career*
Years	Team	Apps	(Gls)
2001–2003	Consadole Sapporo	65	(2)
2004–2011	FC Tokyo	254	(33)
2012–2019	Gamba Osaka	210	(17)
2018	→ Gamba Osaka U-23 (loan)	1	(1)
2019–2021	Júbilo Iwata	34	(1)
2022–	Nankatsu SC	40	(0)

International career
2002–2003	Japan U20	13	(4)
2004	Japan U23	9	(0)
2005–2017	Japan	93	(4)
Medal record
FC Tokyo
Winner	J.League Cup	2004
Winner	J.League Cup	2009
Winner	Emperor's Cup	2011
Gamba Osaka
Winner	J1 League	2014
Runner-up	J1 League	2015
Winner	J.League Cup	2014
Runner-up	J.League Cup	2015
Runner-up	J.League Cup	2016
Winner	Emperor's Cup	2014
Winner	Emperor's Cup	2015
Runner-up	Emperor's Cup	2012
Representing Japan
AFC Asian Cup
Gold medal – first place	2011 Qatar
AFC U-19 Championship
Silver medal – second place	2002 Qatar
- * Club domestic league appearances and goals as of 2 February 2025, 7:22 (UTC)

Yasuyuki Konno (今野 泰幸, Konno Yasuyuki; born 25 January 1983) is a Japanese professional footballer who plays as a midfielder or defender and currently play for Nankatsu SC. He played for Japan national team.

He regular plays as either a defensive midfielder or a centre back. He has previously played for Consadole Sapporo, FC Tokyo and Gamba Osaka.

== Club career ==
After graduating from Tohoku High School, Konno signed his first professional contract with J1 League side Consadole Sapporo ahead of the 2001 season. He spent three seasons in total in Consadole and made 65 league appearances for the men in red and black who were relegated to J2 League for the 2003 season. He spent one year playing J2 before heading south to join FC Tokyo in 2004. He played more than 250 league games across eight seasons at the Ajinomoto Stadium and helped them lift the J.League Cup in 2004 and 2009 as well as J2 League and the Emperor's Cup in his final season at the club in 2011.

He moved west to join Gamba Osaka in 2012. His first season with the men in blue and black was not a happy one as they were relegated down to Japan's second division following a 17th-place finish in the league. They bounced back as champions at the first time of asking with Konno netting four times in 32 games. 2014 got even better for Gamba as they marked their return to Japan's top flight by winning the domestic treble; lifting the J1 League trophy in addition to the J.League Cup and Emperor's Cup. Konno played 46 times and scored twice across all competitions, forming a central midfield partnership with Japan's most capped international player Yasuhito Endō.

Gamba retained their Emperor's Cup title in 2015 and added the 2015 Japanese Super Cup to their trophy cabinet, defeating Urawa Reds in the final of both competitions, they also reached the semi-finals of the AFC Champions League before going down to Chinese side Guangzhou Evergrande over two legs. Konno played 51 times in all competitions in 2015 and scored 6 goals.

Gamba did not win any silverware between 2016 and 2018, but Konno remained an important figure in the side, missing just one league game in 2016 as Gamba finished 3rd in the final standings. Injury forced him out for a spell in 2017 and he was able to make only 24 league appearances before an even longer spell on the sidelines caused him to miss the majority of the first half of the 2018 season. Gamba struggled under new head coach, the Brazilian Levir Culpi who was fired midway through the season and replaced by Gamba Osaka U-23 coach Tsuneyasu Miyamoto. Miyamoto's appointment coincided with Konno's return from injury and a Gamba side that had spent much of the season in the relegation zone went on a nine-match winning streak in the league and eventually ended up in a comfortable 9th place.

On 17 July 2019, Konno moved to Júbilo Iwata.

On 25 January 2022, Konno was announce official transfer to Kantō Div 1 club, Nankatsu SC for 2022 season.

== International career ==
He was part of the Japan U23 national team at 2004 Olympics, which finished fourth in group B, below group winners Paraguay, Italy and Ghana. He also capped for Japan U20 team at the 2003 World Youth Championship.

On 3 August 2005, he made his debut for the senior national team in an East Asian Cup match against China which ended in a 2–2 draw. He earned a second cap four days later, playing the full 90 minutes in a 1–0 win over South Korea. Later that year he came on as a second-half substitute in the 1–0 home victory over Iran in a 2006 World Cup qualifier.

Konno wouldn't play again for his country until after the 2006 World Cup Finals, playing in the 1–0 home friendly defeat to Ghana in October 2006 and the 2007 Asian Cup qualifying wins over India, later that month, and Saudi Arabia in November.

It would be another seven months before he next pulled on the blue of Japan, playing in the home friendly win over Montenegro and the draw with Colombia in June 2007. His performances in those games earned him a spot in Japan's squad for the 2007 Asian Cup and he played three times as they finished in 4th place following a 3–2 semi-final defeat to Saudi Arabia and a penalty shootout loss to South Korea in the 3rd / 4th place play off. He played three more non-competitive matches in 2007; against Qatar, Austria and Egypt.

In February 2008 he was selected in the squad for the East Asian Football Championship and played in the 1–0 win over China and the 1–1 draw with South Korea as Japan ended up in 2nd place in the final standings. 2008 turned out to be a busy year for him internationally as he played a further four friendly matches and 6 2010 World Cup qualifiers.

He played seven times in 2009, the first appearance coming as a second-half replacement in the 5–1 thrashing of Finland in February which was followed up by a start in the 4–0 win against Chile in May. He played twice the following month in the World Cup Qualifiers against Qatar and Australia. The matches did not turn out well for the Samurai Blue who could only draw 1–1 at home to Qatar before going down 2–1 away to Australia seven days later. Japan were back on form later in the year, defeating Scotland and Togo in October with Konno starting the first and coming on in the second half of the latter before also appearing as a substitute the following month in a 0–0 draw away to World Cup hosts South Africa.

The following year he was selected in Japan's squad for the 2010 World Cup in South Africa and handed the number 15 jersey. He only got on the field for 2 minutes in the entire tournament, replacing Yoshito Ōkubo in the 88th minute of Japan's 3–1 Group E win over Denmark in Rustenburg which sealed their qualification to the last 16 where they'd go on to be eliminated by Paraguay on penalties.

2011 saw him named in the squad for the 2011 Asian Cup in Qatar where this time he wore the number 4 on his back. He played every minute of all six of Japan's matches at the tournament as they went on to lift the title, defeating Australia 1–0 after extra time in the final thanks to Tadanari Lee's 109th-minute winner. Later in the year he scored his first international goal, a 36th-minute opener in the 4–0 win away to Tajikistan in a 2014 World Cup qualifier on 11 November.

He played eight internationals in 2012, a mixture of friendlies and World Cup qualifiers before being chosen in the Japan squad for the 2013 Confederations Cup in Brazil the following year. He started all three of the Samurai Blue's games at the tournament which all ended in defeat and saw them finish below Brazil, Italy and Mexico in the Group A standings.

In 2014 he played in his second World Cup, this time in Brazil. Japan were drawn in Group C along with Colombia, Greece and Ivory Coast and finished in 4th place with 1 draw and 2 defeats. Konno didn't play in the opening 2–1 defeat to the Ivory Coast, but started the 0–0 draw with Greece and the 4–1 defeat to Colombia.

He would play only a further ten matches for his country across three years after the 2014 World Cup, however he did manage to increase his international goal tally to four thanks to strikes in the 2–1 home friendly win over Australia in November 2014, the 2–0 away victory over the United Arab Emirates in a 2018 World Cup qualifier in March 2017 and finally in a 1–1 friendly draw at home to Syria on 7 June 2017. He played 93 games and scored four goals for Japan until 2017.

== Career statistics ==
=== Club ===
As of the start for 2025 season.

Appearances and goals by club, season and competition
Club	Season	League			Emperor's Cup		J.League Cup		ACL		Other (Note: Includes J.League Championship, Japanese Super Cup and Suruga Bank Championship appearances.)		Total	
Club	Season	Division	Apps	Goals	Apps	Goals	Apps	Goals	Apps	Goals	Apps	Goals	Apps	Goals
Consadole Sapporo	2001	J.League Div 1	17	0	1	1	1	0	–		–		19	1
Consadole Sapporo	2002	J.League Div 1	22	0	1	0	2	0	–		–		25	0
Consadole Sapporo	2003	J.League Div 2	26	2	0	0	–		–		–		26	2
Consadole Sapporo	Total		65	2	2	1	3	0	–		–		70	3
FC Tokyo	2004	J.League Div 1	26	4	3	0	7	1	–		–		36	5
FC Tokyo	2005	J.League Div 1	34	7	2	0	6	1	–		–		42	8
FC Tokyo	2006	J.League Div 1	28	5	2	0	6	0	–		–		36	5
FC Tokyo	2007	J.League Div 1	33	5	3	1	6	1	–		–		42	7
FC Tokyo	2008	J.League Div 1	32	4	3	0	2	0	–		–		37	4
FC Tokyo	2009	J.League Div 1	34	2	0	0	5	0	–		–		39	2
FC Tokyo	2010	J.League Div 1	34	5	3	0	3	0	–		1	0	41	5
FC Tokyo	2011	J.League Div 2	33	1	4	1	–		–		–		37	2
FC Tokyo	Total		254	33	20	2	35	3	–		1	0	310	38
Gamba Osaka	2012	J.League Div 1	33	2	5	0	2	0	5	0	–		45	2
Gamba Osaka	2013	J.League Div 2	32	4	0	0	–		–		–		32	4
Gamba Osaka	2014	J.League Div 1	33	2	6	0	7	0	–		–		46	2
Gamba Osaka	2015	J1 League	31	3	4	0	4	0	8	0	4	3	51	6
Gamba Osaka	2016	J1 League	33	4	2	1	3	0	5	1	1	0	44	6
Gamba Osaka	2017	J1 League	24	2	2	0	4	0	4	1	–		34	3
Gamba Osaka	2018	J1 League	14	0	0	0	1	0	–		–		15	0
Gamba Osaka	2019	J1 League	10	0	0	0	5	0	–		–		15	0
Gamba Osaka	Total		210	17	19	1	26	0	22	2	5	3	282	23
Gamba Osaka U-23	2018	J3 League	1	1	–		–		–		–		1	1
Júbilo Iwata	2019	J1 League	5	1	0	0	0	0	–		–		5	1
Júbilo Iwata	2020	J2 League	6	0	–		–		–		–		6	0
Júbilo Iwata	2021	J2 League	23	0	3	0	–		–		–		26	0
Júbilo Iwata	Total		34	1	3	0	0	0	–		–		37	1
Nankatsu SC	2022	Kantō Soccer League Div 1	10	0	–						1	0	11	0
Nankatsu SC	2023	Kantō Soccer League Div 1	14	0	–								14	0
Nankatsu SC	2024	Kantō Soccer League Div 1	16	0	–								16	0
Nankatsu SC	2025	Kantō Soccer League Div 1	0	0	0	0	–				0	0	0	0
Nankatsu SC	Total		40	0	–						1	0	41	0
Career total			604	54	44	4	64	3	22	2	7	3	741	66

=== International ===
Appearances and goals by national team and year
National team	Year	Apps	Goals
Japan	2005	3	0
Japan	2006	3	0
Japan	2007	8	0
Japan	2008	12	0
Japan	2009	7	0
Japan	2010	7	0
Japan	2011	15	1
Japan	2012	8	0
Japan	2013	15	0
Japan	2014	6	1
Japan	2015	3	0
Japan	2016	0	0
Japan	2017	6	2
Total		93	4

Scores and results list Japan's goal tally first, score column indicates score after each Konno goal.

List of international goals scored by Yasuyuki Konno
No.	Date	Venue	Opponent	Score	Result	Competition
1	11 November 2011	Central Stadium, Dushanbe, Tajikistan	Tajikistan	1–0	4–0	2014 FIFA World Cup qualification
2	18 November 2014	Nagai Stadium, Osaka, Japan	Australia	1–0	2–1	Friendly
3	23 March 2017	Hazza Bin Zayed Stadium, Al Ain, United Arab Emirates	United Arab Emirates	2–0	2–0	2018 FIFA World Cup qualification
4	7 June 2017	Ajinomoto Stadium, Tokyo, Japan	Syria	1–1	1–1	2017 Kirin Cup

== Honours ==
FC Tokyo

- J2 League: 2011
- Emperor's Cup: 2011
- J.League Cup: 2004, 2009
- Suruga Bank Championship: 2010

Gamba Osaka

- J1 League: 2014
- J2 League: 2013
- Emperor's Cup: 2014, 2015
- J.League Cup: 2014

Japan

- AFC Asian Cup: 2011
