= Ryōta Suzuki =

Ryōta Suzuki may refer to:

- Ryōta Suzuki (voice actor) (鈴木 崚汰, born 1998), Japanese voice actor
- Ryota Suzuki (footballer) (鈴木 椋大, born 1994), Japanese footballer
- Ryota Suzuki (athlete) (鈴木 椋大, born 1999), Japanese athlete
