= Haruya Ide =

Japanese footballer (born 1994)

Haruya Ide 井出 遥也
Personal information
- Full name: Haruya Ide
- Date of birth: 25 March 1994 (age 32)
- Place of birth: Chiba, Japan
- Height: 1.71 m (5 ft 7 in)
- Position: Midfielder

Team information
- Current team: Vissel Kobe
- Number: 18

Youth career
- Takayanagi FC
- 2003–2005: Criaju FC Mickey
- 2006–2011: JEF United Chiba

Senior career*
| Years | Team | Apps | (Gls) |
| 2011–2016 | JEF United Chiba | 99 | (15) |
| 2014 | → J.League U-22 Selection (loan) | 1 | (0) |
| 2017–2018 | Gamba Osaka | 9 | (0) |
| 2018 | → Gamba Osaka U-23 (loan) | 16 | (5) |
| 2019 | Montedio Yamagata | 34 | (2) |
| 2020–2022 | Tokyo Verdy | 55 | (5) |
| 2023– | Vissel Kobe | 59 | (3) |
- * Club domestic league appearances and goals as of 10 August 2026

Haruya Ide (井出 遥也, Ide Haruya; born 25 March 1994) is a Japanese footballer who plays as a midfielder for J1 League club Vissel Kobe.

== Career ==
As a third year elementary student, he moved to Adachi, Tokyo. After playing for Criaju FC in his early career he joined the youth of JEF United Chiba after being urged on by a friend's sister. He made his debut for the first team in the home win (2–1) against Mito HollyHock on 3 December 2011 by replacing Yuichi Kubo in the 79th minute.

Ide transferred to J2 League club Montedio Yamagata in December 2018.

On 6 January 2020, Ide signed for J2 League side Tokyo Verdy.

On 29 December 2022, it was announced that Ide had signed for Vissel Kobe.

== Club statistics ==
As of 12 April 2023.

Appearances and goals by club, season and competition
| Club | Season | League | | | Emperor's Cup | | League Cup | | Other | | Total | |
| Club | Season | Division | Apps | Goals | Apps | Goals | Apps | Goals | Apps | Goals | Apps | Goals |
|---|---|---|---|---|---|---|---|---|---|---|---|---|
| JEF United Chiba | 2011 | J2 League | 1 | 0 | 1 | 0 | — | | — | | 2 | 0 |
| JEF United Chiba | 2012 | J2 League | 0 | 0 | 2 | 0 | — | | — | | 2 | 0 |
| JEF United Chiba | 2013 | J2 League | 0 | 0 | 0 | 0 | — | | — | | 0 | 0 |
| JEF United Chiba | 2014 | J2 League | 32 | 4 | 5 | 0 | — | | — | | 37 | 4 |
| JEF United Chiba | 2015 | J2 League | 31 | 6 | 1 | 0 | — | | — | | 32 | 6 |
| JEF United Chiba | 2016 | J2 League | 35 | 5 | 2 | 0 | — | | — | | 37 | 5 |
| JEF United Chiba | Total | | 99 | 15 | 11 | 0 | 0 | 0 | 0 | 0 | 110 | 15 |
| J.League U-22 Selection (loan) | 2014 | J3 League | 1 | 0 | — | | — | | — | | 1 | 0 |
| Gamba Osaka | 2017 | J1 League | 2 | 0 | 1 | 0 | 2 | 1 | — | | 5 | 1 |
| Gamba Osaka | 2018 | J1 League | 7 | 0 | 0 | 0 | 3 | 0 | — | | 10 | 0 |
| Gamba Osaka | Total | | 9 | 0 | 1 | 0 | 5 | 1 | 0 | 0 | 15 | 1 |
| Gamba Osaka U-23 (loan) | 2018 | J3 League | 16 | 5 | — | | — | | — | | 16 | 5 |
| Montedio Yamagata | 2019 | J2 League | 32 | 2 | 1 | 0 | — | | 2 (Note: Appearances in the J1/J2 play-offs) | 0 | 35 | 2 |
| Tokyo Verdy | 2020 | J2 League | 35 | 2 | 0 | 0 | — | | — | | 35 | 2 |
| Tokyo Verdy | 2021 | J2 League | 13 | 3 | 0 | 0 | — | | — | | 13 | 3 |
| Tokyo Verdy | 2022 | J2 League | 7 | 0 | 1 | 0 | — | | — | | 8 | 0 |
| Tokyo Verdy | Total | | 55 | 5 | 1 | 0 | 0 | 0 | 0 | 0 | 56 | 5 |
| Vissel Kobe | 2023 | J1 League | 4 | 0 | 0 | 0 | 2 | 0 | — | | 6 | 0 |
| Career Total | | | 216 | 27 | 14 | 0 | 7 | 1 | 2 | 0 | 239 | 28 |

== Club Memberships ==
Youth History

- Takayagi Football Club
- Criaju Rockies
- 2006-2008 JEF United Chiba U-15 Narashino
- 2009-2011 JEF United Chiba U-18
- 2011 JEF United Chiba Division 2

Pro History

- 2012 JEF United Chiba
- 2014 J League U-22 Selection

== Honours ==
Vissel Kobe

- J1 League: 2023, 2024
- Emperor's Cup: 2024
- J1 100 Year Vision League: 2026
