= Hiroki Noda =

Japanese footballer

Personal information
- Full name: Hiroki Noda
- Date of birth: 27 July 1997 (age 29)
- Place of birth: Kumamoto, Japan
- Height: 1.81 m (5 ft 11 1/2 in)
- Position: Centre back

Team information
- Current team: Matsumoto Yamaga
- Number: 6

Youth career
- Luther Gakuin Junior High School
- Blaze Kumamoto
- 2013–2015: Ohzu High School

Senior career*
Years	Team	Apps	(Gls)
2014–2015	Roasso Kumamoto	5	(0)
2016–2019	Gamba Osaka U-23	67	(3)
2016–2019	Gamba Osaka	0	(0)
2019	→ Montedio Yamagata (loan)	7	(0)
2020–2023	Montedio Yamagata	145	(8)
2024–2026	Kashiwa Reysol	7	(0)
2026–	Matsumoto Yamaga	7	(0)
Medal record
Gamba Osaka
Runner-up	J.League Cup	2016
- * Club domestic league appearances and goals as of 14:25, 13 October 2026 (UTC)

Hiroki Noda (野田 裕喜, Noda Hiroki; born 27 July, 1997) is a Japanese footballer who currently plays as a centre-back for J3 League club Matsumoto Yamaga.

== Senior career ==
Noda made 5 appearances for J2 League outfit Roasso Kumamoto in 2014 and 2015 while he was still in high school.

He joined Gamba Osaka from Ohzu High School in his native Kyushu ahead of the 2016 season. Although he didn't make any senior appearances for Gamba in 2016, he played 27 times and scored 3 goals for Gamba U-23 in J3 League.

2017 saw him make his first senior appearance for Gamba as a 78th minute substitute for Jin Izumisawa in a 2-1 home defeat to Cerezo Osaka in the semi-finals of the J.League Cup. Additionally he played 5 times for Gamba U-23 as the team was run more as a youth team than a reserve team during this campaign.

The following year saw Gamba's Under-23 side revert to being a reserve team and Noda played 26 games to help them to 6th position in the final standings. He also played twice for Gamba's senior side in the J. League Cup quarter-finals against Yokohama F. Marinos.

== Career statistics ==
As of 13 October 2026.

Appearances and goals by club, season and competition
Club	Season	League			National cup (Note: Includes Emperor's Cup)		League cup (Note: Includes J.League Cup)		Other		Total	
Club	Season	Division	Apps	Goals	Apps	Goals	Apps	Goals	Apps	Goals	Apps	Goals
Roasso Kumamoto	2014	J.League Division 2	1	0	–		–		–		1	0
Roasso Kumamoto	2015	J2 League	4	0	–		–		–		4	0
Roasso Kumamoto	Total		5	0	0	0	0	0	0	0	5	0
Gamba Osaka U-23	2016	J3 League	27	3	–		–		–		27	3
Gamba Osaka U-23	2017	J3 League	5	0	–		–		–		5	0
Gamba Osaka U-23	2018	J3 League	26	0	–		–		–		26	0
Gamba Osaka U-23	2019	J3 League	9	0	–		–		–		9	0
Gamba Osaka U-23	Total		67	3	0	0	0	0	0	0	67	3
Gamba Osaka	2016	J1 League	0	0	0	0	0	0	0	0	0	0
Gamba Osaka	2017	J1 League	0	0	0	0	1	0	0	0	1	0
Gamba Osaka	2018	J1 League	0	0	0	0	2	0	0	0	2	0
Gamba Osaka	2019	J1 League	0	0	0	0	0	0	0	0	0	0
Gamba Osaka	Total		0	0	0	0	3	0	0	0	3	0
Montedio Yamagata (loan)	2019	J2 League	6	0	0	0	–		1 (Note: Appearance in J1/J2 play-offs)	0	7	0
Montedio Yamagata	2020	J2 League	34	1	0	0	–		0	0	34	1
Montedio Yamagata	2021	J2 League	35	2	0	0	–		0	0	35	2
Montedio Yamagata	2022	J2 League	37	2	0	0	–		2	0	39	2
Montedio Yamagata	2023	J2 League	39	3	1	0	–		1	0	41	3
Montedio Yamagata	Total		145	8	1	0	0	0	3	0	149	8
Kashiwa Reysol	2024	J1 League	6	0	2	0	3	1	–		11	1
Kashiwa Reysol	2025	J1 League	0	0	1	0	2	0	–		3	0
Kashiwa Reysol	2026	J1 (100)	1	0	–		–		–		1	0
Kashiwa Reysol	2026–27	J1 League	0	0	0	0	0	0	–		0	0
Kashiwa Reysol	Total		7	0	3	0	5	1	0	0	15	1
Matsumoto Yamaga	2026–27	J3 League	7	0	–		1	0	–		8	0
Career total			237	11	4	0	9	1	4	0	254	12
