= 2016 Gamba Osaka U-23 season =

Gamba Osaka U-23
2016 season
- Manager: Noritada Saneyoshi
- Stadium: Suita City Football Stadium
- J3 League: 9th

2016 Gamba Osaka U-23 season.

== J3 League ==
=== League table ===
| Pos | Team | Pld | W | D | L | GF | GA | GD | Pts |
|---|---|---|---|---|---|---|---|---|---|
| 6 | Kataller Toyama | 30 | 13 | 10 | 7 | 37 | 29 | +8 | 49 |
| 7 | Fujieda MYFC | 30 | 14 | 3 | 13 | 48 | 42 | +6 | 45 |
| 8 | FC Ryukyu | 30 | 12 | 8 | 10 | 46 | 46 | 0 | 44 |
| 9 | Gamba Osaka U-23 | 30 | 10 | 8 | 12 | 42 | 41 | +1 | 38 |
| 10 | FC Tokyo U-23 | 30 | 9 | 9 | 12 | 32 | 31 | +1 | 36 |
| 11 | SC Sagamihara | 30 | 9 | 8 | 13 | 29 | 46 | −17 | 35 |
| 12 | Cerezo Osaka U-23 | 30 | 8 | 8 | 14 | 38 | 47 | −9 | 32 |

Updated to match(es) played on 20 November 2016. Source: 2016 MEIJI YASUDA J3 LEAGUE League table
Rules for classification: 1) Points; 2) Goal difference; 3) Goals scored; 4th) head-to-head results; 5th) disciplinary points; 6th) draw

=== Match details ===
J3 League match details
| Match | Date | Team | Score | Team | Venue | Attendance |
|---|---|---|---|---|---|---|
| 1 | 2016.03.13 | Gamba Osaka U-23 | 0-0 | YSCC Yokohama | Suita City Football Stadium | 3,359 |
| 2 | 2016.03.20 | Gamba Osaka U-23 | 4-1 | Grulla Morioka | Suita City Football Stadium | 2,870 |
| 3 | 2016.04.03 | Kataller Toyama | 2-1 | Gamba Osaka U-23 | Toyama Stadium | 3,676 |
| 4 | 2016.04.10 | Gamba Osaka U-23 | 2-1 | Cerezo Osaka U-23 | Suita City Football Stadium | 8,038 |
| 5 | 2016.04.17 | FC Tokyo U-23 | 1-1 | Gamba Osaka U-23 | Yumenoshima Stadium | 1,993 |
| 6 | 2016.04.23 | Gamba Osaka U-23 | 2-2 | Oita Trinita | Expo '70 Commemorative Stadium | 1,711 |
| 7 | 2016.05.01 | Blaublitz Akita | 1-0 | Gamba Osaka U-23 | Akigin Stadium | 1,751 |
| 8 | 2016.05.08 | Gamba Osaka U-23 | 2-0 | Fujieda MYFC | Expo '70 Commemorative Stadium | 1,690 |
| 9 | 2016.05.15 | FC Ryukyu | 1-0 | Gamba Osaka U-23 | Okinawa Athletic Park Stadium | 1,251 |
| 10 | 2016.05.22 | Gamba Osaka U-23 | 0-1 | SC Sagamihara | Expo '70 Commemorative Stadium | 1,515 |
| 11 | 2016.05.29 | Kagoshima United FC | 3-1 | Gamba Osaka U-23 | Kagoshima Kamoike Stadium | 2,024 |
| 12 | 2016.06.12 | Gainare Tottori | 0-4 | Gamba Osaka U-23 | Tottori Bank Bird Stadium | 1,867 |
| 13 | 2016.06.19 | Gamba Osaka U-23 | 2-3 | Tochigi SC | Suita City Football Stadium | 1,770 |
| 14 | 2016.06.26 | Fukushima United FC | 1-1 | Gamba Osaka U-23 | Toho Stadium | 1,522 |
| 15 | 2016.07.03 | Gamba Osaka U-23 | 1-1 | AC Nagano Parceiro | Suita City Football Stadium | 1,862 |
| 16 | 2016.07.10 | Cerezo Osaka U-23 | 1-2 | Gamba Osaka U-23 | Kincho Stadium | 4,915 |
| 17 | 2016.07.16 | SC Sagamihara | 1-2 | Gamba Osaka U-23 | Sagamihara Gion Stadium | 3,487 |
| 18 | 2016.07.24 | Gamba Osaka U-23 | 1-0 | Fukushima United FC | Suita City Football Stadium | 1,552 |
| 19 | 2016.07.31 | Grulla Morioka | 0-0 | Gamba Osaka U-23 | Iwagin Stadium | 1,280 |
| 20 | 2016.08.07 | Gamba Osaka U-23 | 1-4 | FC Ryukyu | Expo '70 Commemorative Stadium | 1,066 |
| 21 | 2016.09.11 | AC Nagano Parceiro | 4-0 | Gamba Osaka U-23 | Minami Nagano Sports Park Stadium | 4,863 |
| 22 | 2016.09.18 | Gamba Osaka U-23 | 6-1 | Kagoshima United FC | Suita City Football Stadium | 2,655 |
| 23 | 2016.09.25 | Tochigi SC | 0-2 | Gamba Osaka U-23 | Tochigi Green Stadium | 4,715 |
| 24 | 2016.10.02 | Gamba Osaka U-23 | 3-0 | Kataller Toyama | Expo '70 Commemorative Stadium | 1,073 |
| 25 | 2016.10.16 | Fujieda MYFC | 4-0 | Gamba Osaka U-23 | Shizuoka Stadium | 1,198 |
| 26 | 2016.10.23 | Gamba Osaka U-23 | 1-1 | FC Tokyo U-23 | Expo '70 Commemorative Stadium | 1,257 |
| 27 | 2016.10.30 | Gamba Osaka U-23 | 1-2 | Gainare Tottori | Expo '70 Commemorative Stadium | 1,400 |
| 28 | 2016.11.06 | Oita Trinita | 1-0 | Gamba Osaka U-23 | Oita Bank Dome | 8,121 |
| 29 | 2016.11.13 | Gamba Osaka U-23 | 2-2 | Blaublitz Akita | Suita City Football Stadium | 4,203 |
| 30 | 2016.11.20 | YSCC Yokohama | 2-0 | Gamba Osaka U-23 | Yokohama Mitsuzawa Athletic Stadium | 1,587 |
