= Motonobu Ogino =

Japanese footballer

Personal information
- Date of birth: 27 June 2002 (age 24)
- Place of birth: Kyoto, Japan
- Height: 1.77 m (5 ft 10 in)
- Position: Midfielder

Team information
- Current team: Gamba Osaka

Youth career
- Kyoto Rhino 2001 FC
- –: Gamba Osaka

Senior career*
| Years | Team | Apps | (Gls) |
| 2020 | Gamba Osaka U-23 | 15 | (1) |
- * Club domestic league appearances and goals as of 17:04, 17 March 2021 (UTC)

Motonobu Ogino (荻野 元伸, Ogino Motonobu; born 27 June 2002) is a Japanese footballer currently playing as a midfielder for Gamba Osaka U-23.

== Career statistics ==
=== Club ===
As of 17 March 2021.

| Club | Season | League | | | National Cup | | League Cup | | Other | | Total | |
| Club | Season | Division | Apps | Goals | Apps | Goals | Apps | Goals | Apps | Goals | Apps | Goals |
|---|---|---|---|---|---|---|---|---|---|---|---|---|
| Gamba Osaka U-23 | 2020 | J3 League | 15 | 1 | – | | – | | 0 | 0 | 15 | 1 |
| Career total | | | 15 | 1 | 0 | 0 | 0 | 0 | 0 | 0 | 15 | 1 |
