= Ryotaro Meshino =

Japanese footballer

Personal information
- Full name: Ryotaro Meshino
- Date of birth: 18 June 1998 (age 28)
- Place of birth: Osaka, Japan
- Height: 1.71 m (5 ft 7 in)
- Positions: Winger; forward

Team information
- Current team: Gamba Osaka
- Number: 8

Youth career
- 2011–2016: Gamba Osaka

Senior career*
Years	Team	Apps	(Gls)
2016–2019	Gamba Osaka U-23	67	(17)
2017–2019	Gamba Osaka	23	(3)
2019–2022	Manchester City	0	(0)
2019–2020	→ Heart of Midlothian (loan)	20	(3)
2020–2021	→ Rio Ave (loan)	19	(3)
2021–2022	→ Estoril (loan)	9	(1)
2022–	Gamba Osaka	78	(7)

International career
2019–	Japan U23	5	(1)
- * Club domestic league appearances and goals as of 9 August 2026

Ryotaro Meshino (食野 亮太郎, Meshino Ryōtarō; born 18 June 1998) is a Japanese professional footballer. He plays for Gamba Osaka in the J1 League.

== Career ==
=== Gamba Osaka ===
Meshino signed his first senior contract with Gamba Osaka ahead of the 2017 season and was handed the number 40 jersey. He didn't feature at all in 2017, but Brazilian coach Levir Culpi handed him his J1 League debut in week six of the 2018 campaign, a 1-0 home defeat by Vissel Kobe. He went on to make 11 appearances in J1 League that year as well as five in the J. League cup; where he scored in the 3-2 win away to Sanfrecce Hiroshima on 9 May, and one in the Emperor's Cup.

While still officially a member of Gamba Osaka's youth team, Meshino started playing for Gamba U-23 in J3 League in 2016. He debuted on 13 March in a game against YSCC Yokohama and in total scored one goal in 13 appearances in 2016. After being promoted to a senior contract in 2017, he began to play more regularly; scoring three times in 20 games in 2017. 2018 saw him become more of a regular member of Gamba's J1 league squad, however, he still managed to make 15 appearances in J3; scoring five times, including a double in Gamba's season-opening win over Grulla Morioka on March 11.

=== Manchester City ===
On 9 August 2019, Premier League club Manchester City signed Meshino on a three-year deal.

==== Hearts (loan) ====
On 4 September 2019, a month after signing for Manchester City, Meshino was loaned to Scottish Premiership club Heart of Midlothian until the end of the season.

==== Rio Ave (loan) ====
In September 2020, Meshino joined Primeira Liga club Rio Ave on a two year loan deal. He returned to Manchester City at the end of the 2020–21 season.

==== Estoril (loan) ====
In July 2021, Meshino returned to Portugal, joining Primeira Liga club Estoril on loan for the season.

=== Gamba Osaka ===
On 8 July 2022, Gamba Osaka announced the return of Meshino on a permanent transfer.

== Career statistics ==
=== First team ===
As of 11 February 2023.

Club performance			League		Cup		League Cup		Continental		Other		Total	
Club	Season	League	Apps	Goals	Apps	Goals	Apps	Goals	Apps	Goals	Apps	Goals	Apps	Goals
Gamba Osaka	2017	J1 League	—										0	0
Gamba Osaka	2018	J1 League	11	0	1	0	5	1	—		—		17	1
Gamba Osaka	2019	J1 League	12	3	0	0	—		—		—		12	3
Gamba Osaka	2022	J1 League	13	2	0	0	—		—		—		13	2
Gamba Osaka	Total		36	5	1	0	5	1	0	0	0	0	42	6
Manchester City	2019–20	Premier League	—										0	0
Manchester City	2020–21	Premier League	—										0	0
Manchester City	2021–22	Premier League	—										0	0
Manchester City	Total		0	0	0	0	0	0	0	0	0	0	0	0
Heart of Midlothian (loan)	2019–20	Scottish Premiership	20	3	2	0	—		—		—		22	3
Rio Ave (loan)	2020–21	Primeira Liga	13	3	2	1	—		1	0	—		16	4
G.D. Estoril Praia (loan)	2021–22	Primeira Liga	9	1	2	0	—		—		11	1		
Career total			78	12	7	1	5	1	1	0	0	0	91	14

=== Reserves team ===
As of 2 December 2018.

Club performance			League		Total	
Club	Season	League	Apps	Goals	Apps	Goals
Gamba Osaka U-23	2016	J3	13	1	13	1
Gamba Osaka U-23	2017	J3	20	3	20	3
Gamba Osaka U-23	2018	J3	15	5	15	5
Gamba Osaka U-23	2019	J3	8	8	8	8
Career total			56	17	56	17

== Honours ==
Gamba Osaka

- AFC Champions League Two: 2025–26
