= Shoji Toyama =

Japanese association football player

Shoji Toyama 唐山 翔自
Personal information
- Full name: Shoji Toyama
- Date of birth: 21 September 2002 (age 24)
- Place of birth: Toyonaka, Osaka, Japan
- Height: 1.78 m (5 ft 10 in)
- Position: Forward

Team information
- Current team: Hokkaido Consadole Sapporo (on loan from Gamba Osaka)
- Number: 38

Youth career
- –2020: Gamba Osaka

Senior career*
| Years | Team | Apps | (Gls) |
| 2019–2020 | Gamba Osaka U-23 | 33 | (18) |
| 2020– | Gamba Osaka | 30 | (1) |
| 2021 | → Ehime FC (loan) | 19 | (1) |
| 2022–2023 | → Mito HollyHock (loan) | 32 | (6) |
| 2024 | → Roasso Kumamoto (loan) | 13 | (3) |
| 2025 | → Tokyo Verdy (loan) | 3 | (0) |
| 2026– | → Hokkaido Consadole Sapporo (loan) | 1 | (0) |

International career
| 2017 | Japan U15 | | |
| 2018 | Japan U16 | 5 | (5) |
| 2019 | Japan U17 | 4 | (0) |
| 2020 | Japan U19 | | |
- * Club domestic league appearances and goals as of 13 August 2026

Shoji Toyama (唐山 翔自, Tōyama Shōji; born 21 September 2002) is a Japanese footballer who plays as a forward for J1 League club Hokkaido Consadole Sapporo, on loan from Gamba Osaka.

== Career ==
Whilst at Gamba Osaka, he was a second-year high school student, and was registered for Gamba Osaka U-23 as a type-2 player. On 1 September 2019, he became the youngest player in J League history to score a hattrick after scoring against Fukushima United. On 18 November 2019, Gamba Osaka announced he would be promoted to the first team from the 2020 season. He scored two goals in the J.League Cup on 12 August 2020 to seal the victory over Shonan Bellmare. Toyama made his J1 League debut against Vegalta Sendai on 14 November 2020.

During the opening match of Gamba Osaka U23's 2020 season, he opened the scoring in the 20th minute. Although he was initially have believed to have scored two goals, on 3 July 2020, it was announced that his teammate Mizuki Ichimaru had actually scored the second goal.

On 27 April 2021, Toyama was announced at Ehime on a one year loan.

On 28 December 2021, Toyama was announced at Mito HollyHock on a one year loan. On 20 December 2022, his loan was extended for another year through the 2023 season. However, on 30 July 2023, his loan was cut short and he returned to Gamba Osaka.

On 9 July 2024, Toyama was announced at Roasso Kumamoto on a six month loan.

On 28 December 2024, Toyama's loan expired and he returned to Gamba Osaka for the 2025 season.

== International career ==
On 4 October 2019, Toyama was called up to the Japan U17 squad for the 2019 FIFA U-17 World Cup.

== Career statistics ==
=== Club ===
As of 20 October 2023.

Appearances and goals by club, season and competition
| Club | Season | League | | | National Cup (Note: Appearances in the Emperor's Cup) | | League Cup (Note: Appearances at the J.League Cup) | | Other | | Total | |
| Club | Season | Division | Apps | Goals | Apps | Goals | Apps | Goals | Apps | Goals | Apps | Goals |
|---|---|---|---|---|---|---|---|---|---|---|---|---|
| Gamba Osaka U-23 | 2019 | J3 League | 10 | 8 | – | | – | | 0 | 0 | 10 | 8 |
| Gamba Osaka U-23 | 2020 | J3 League | 23 | 10 | – | | – | | 0 | 0 | 23 | 10 |
| Gamba Osaka U-23 | Total | | 33 | 18 | 0 | 0 | 0 | 0 | 0 | 0 | 33 | 18 |
| Gamba Osaka | 2020 | J1 League | 7 | 0 | 0 | 0 | 1 | 2 | 0 | 0 | 8 | 2 |
| Gamba Osaka | 2023 | J1 League | 1 | 0 | 0 | 0 | 0 | 0 | 0 | 0 | 1 | 0 |
| Gamba Osaka | Total | | 8 | 0 | 0 | 0 | 1 | 2 | 0 | 0 | 9 | 2 |
| Ehime FC (loan) | 2021 | J2 League | 19 | 1 | 1 | 0 | – | | 0 | 0 | 20 | 1 |
| Ehime FC (loan) | Total | | 19 | 1 | 1 | 0 | 0 | 0 | 0 | 0 | 20 | 1 |
| Mito HollyHock (loan) | 2022 | J2 League | 16 | 5 | 1 | 0 | – | | 0 | 0 | 17 | 5 |
| Mito HollyHock (loan) | 2023 | J2 League | 16 | 1 | 2 | 1 | – | | 0 | 0 | 18 | 2 |
| Mito HollyHock (loan) | Total | | 32 | 6 | 3 | 1 | 0 | 0 | 0 | 0 | 35 | 7 |
| Career total | | | 92 | 25 | 4 | 1 | 1 | 2 | 0 | 0 | 97 | 28 |

== Honours ==
Gamba Osaka

- AFC Champions League Two: 2025–26

Japan U16

- AFC U-16 Championship: 2018
