= 2017 Gamba Osaka U-23 season =

Gamba Osaka U-23
2017 season
- Manager: Tsuneyasu Miyamoto
- Stadium: Suita City Football Stadium
- J3 League: 16th

2017 Gamba Osaka U-23 season.

== J3 League ==
=== League table ===
Pos	Team	Pld	W	D	L	GF	GA	GD	Pts
12	SC Sagamihara	32	9	12	11	34	41	−7	39
13	Cerezo Osaka U-23	32	8	11	13	39	43	−4	35
14	YSCC Yokohama	32	8	8	16	41	54	−13	32
15	Grulla Morioka	32	7	8	17	32	49	−17	29
16	Gamba Osaka U-23	32	7	5	20	31	65	−34	26
17	Gainare Tottori	32	4	9	19	31	63	−32	21

Source: 2017 MEIJI YASUDA J3 LEAGUE League table
Rules for classification: 1) Points; 2) Goal difference; 3) Goals scored; 4th) head-to-head results; 5th) disciplinary points; 6th) draw

=== Match details ===
J3 League match details
Match	Date	Team	Score	Team	Venue	Attendance
1	2017.03.12	Gamba Osaka U-23	0-2	Gainare Tottori	Suita City Football Stadium	2,148
2	2017.03.20	Gamba Osaka U-23	0-1	SC Sagamihara	Suita City Football Stadium	1,609
3	2017.03.25	Kagoshima United FC	1-0	Gamba Osaka U-23	Kagoshima Kamoike Stadium	2,219
4	2017.04.01	FC Ryukyu	3-0	Gamba Osaka U-23	Okinawa Athletic Park Stadium	1,559
5	2017.04.15	Gamba Osaka U-23	0-2	AC Nagano Parceiro	Suita City Football Stadium	1,427
6	2017.04.30	Fukushima United FC	0-1	Gamba Osaka U-23	Toho Stadium	1,329
8	2017.05.14	Gamba Osaka U-23	1-2	YSCC Yokohama	Suita City Football Stadium	1,004
9	2017.05.21	Azul Claro Numazu	4-0	Gamba Osaka U-23	Ashitaka Park Stadium	3,056
10	2017.05.28	Gamba Osaka U-23	0-0	Cerezo Osaka U-23	Suita City Football Stadium	2,317
11	2017.06.03	FC Tokyo U-23	1-0	Gamba Osaka U-23	Ajinomoto Field Nishigaoka	2,129
12	2017.06.10	Giravanz Kitakyushu	2-1	Gamba Osaka U-23	Mikuni World Stadium Kitakyushu	6,140
13	2017.06.18	Gamba Osaka U-23	1-0	Grulla Morioka	Expo '70 Commemorative Stadium	735
14	2017.06.25	Kataller Toyama	2-0	Gamba Osaka U-23	Toyama Stadium	2,585
15	2017.07.02	Gamba Osaka U-23	3-2	Tochigi SC	Suita City Football Stadium	1,043
16	2017.07.09	Fujieda MYFC	2-1	Gamba Osaka U-23	Fujieda Soccer Stadium	1,688
17	2017.07.15	Gamba Osaka U-23	2-1	Blaublitz Akita	Expo '70 Commemorative Stadium	902
18	2017.07.22	Gamba Osaka U-23	0-2	Kataller Toyama	Suita City Football Stadium	1,750
19	2017.08.20	Grulla Morioka	0-2	Gamba Osaka U-23	Kitakami Stadium	3,590
20	2017.08.27	Blaublitz Akita	2-0	Gamba Osaka U-23	Akigin Stadium	2,288
21	2017.09.04	Gamba Osaka U-23	1-7	FC Ryukyu	Suita City Football Stadium	597
22	2017.09.10	Gamba Osaka U-23	2-3	Azul Claro Numazu	Suita City Football Stadium	1,044
23	2017.09.16	Tochigi SC	2-0	Gamba Osaka U-23	Tochigi Green Stadium	11,191
24	2017.09.24	AC Nagano Parceiro	3-0	Gamba Osaka U-23	Minami Nagano Sports Park Stadium	3,530
25	2017.10.01	Gamba Osaka U-23	1-6	Fujieda MYFC	Expo '70 Commemorative Stadium	632
26	2017.10.07	Cerezo Osaka U-23	3-2	Gamba Osaka U-23	Yanmar Stadium Nagai	1,653
27	2017.10.15	Gamba Osaka U-23	1-2	Fukushima United FC	Suita City Football Stadium	523
28	2017.10.22	Gainare Tottori	0-0	Gamba Osaka U-23	Chubu Yajin Stadium	787
29	2017.10.30	Gamba Osaka U-23	2-2	Giravanz Kitakyushu	Suita City Football Stadium	827
30	2017.11.05	Gamba Osaka U-23	4-3	FC Tokyo U-23	Suita City Football Stadium	1,805
31	2017.11.11	YSCC Yokohama	3-4	Gamba Osaka U-23	NHK Spring Mitsuzawa Football Stadium	1,232
32	2017.11.19	Gamba Osaka U-23	0-0	Kagoshima United FC	Suita City Football Stadium	1,257
33	2017.11.26	SC Sagamihara	2-2	Gamba Osaka U-23	Sagamihara Gion Stadium	4,612
