= Yuto Mori =

Japanese footballer

Personal information
- Full name: Yuto Mori
- Date of birth: 21 April 1995 (age 31)
- Place of birth: Anjo, Aichi, Japan
- Height: 1.73 m (5 ft 8 in)
- Position: Midfielder

Team information
- Current team: Kamatamare Sanuki
- Number: 8

Youth career
- –2013: Nagoya Grampus

Senior career*
Years	Team	Apps	(Gls)
2014–2016	Nagoya Grampus	0	(0)
2014–2015	→J.League U-22 Selection (loan)	3	(0)
2017–2018	→ Gamba Osaka U-23 (loan)	46	(5)
2017–2018	Gamba Osaka	1	(0)
2019–2022	Mito HollyHock	85	(5)
2023–	Kamatamare Sanuki	83	(4)
- * Club domestic league appearances and goals as of 1 January 2026

Yuto Mori (森 勇人, Mori Yūto; born 21 April 1995 in Anjo, Aichi, Japan) is a Japanese footballer who plays as a midfielder for Kamatamare Sanuki in J3 League from 2023. He has previously played for both Nagoya Grampus and Gamba Osaka.

== Career ==
=== Nagoya Grampus ===
Mori made his official debut for Nagoya Grampus in the J. League Division 1, J. League Cup on 19 March 2014 against Ventforet Kofu in Mizuho Athletic Stadium in Nagoya, Japan. He started the match and was subbed out in the 67th minute replaced by Ryota Aoki. Mori and his club lost the match 1-0.

== Club career statistics ==
Updated 2 December 2018.

Club performance			League		Cup		League Cup		Continental		Total	
Season	Club	League	Apps	Goals	Apps	Goals	Apps	Goals	Apps	Goals	Apps	Goals
Japan			League		Emperor's Cup		J. League Cup		Asia		Total	
2014	Nagoya Grampus	J1	0	0	0	0	1	0	-		1	0
2015	Nagoya Grampus	J1	0	0	1	0	1	0	-		2	0
2016	Nagoya Grampus	J1	0	0	0	0	2	0	-		2	0
Total			0	0	1	0	4	0	-		5	0
2017	Gamba Osaka	J1	0	0	0	0	0	0	0	0	0	0
2018	Gamba Osaka	J1	1	0	1	0	4	0	-		6	0
Total			1	0	1	0	4	0	0	0	6	0
Career total			1	0	2	0	8	0	-		11	0

Reserves performance

Club performance			League		Total	
Season	Club	League	Apps	Goals	Apps	Goals
Japan			League		Total	
2014	J.League U-22 Selection	J3	2	0	2	0
2015	J.League U-22 Selection	J3	1	0	1	0
2017	Gamba Osaka U-23	J3	24	3	24	3
2018	Gamba Osaka U-23	J3	22	2	22	2
Career total			49	5	49	5
