= Naoya Senoo =

Japanese footballer

Naoya Senoo 妹尾 直哉
Personal information
- Full name: Naoya Senoo
- Date of birth: 15 August 1996 (age 30)
- Place of birth: Tsu, Mie, Japan
- Height: 1.72 m (5 ft 8 in)
- Position: Midfielder

Team information
- Current team: Vanraure Hachinohe
- Number: 14

Youth career
- 2009−2011: Tsu Rapid FC
- 2012−2014: Gamba Osaka

Senior career*
Years	Team	Apps	(Gls)
2015−2018	Gamba Osaka	0	(0)
2016−2018	Gamba Osaka U-23	74	(12)
2019−2020	Nagano Parceiro	15	(1)
2021−2022	Gainare Tottori	31	(4)
2023−	Vanraure Hachinohe	90	(15)
Medal record
Gamba Osaka
Runner-up	J1 League	2015
Runner-up	J.League Cup	2015
Runner-up	J.League Cup	2016
Winner	Emperor's Cup	2015
- * Club domestic league appearances and goals as of 1 January 2026

Naoya Senoo (妹尾 直哉, Senoo Naoya) is a Japanese football player who currently plays for Vanraure Hachinohe in the J3 League.

== Club career ==
In 7 December 2022, Senoo joined to J3 club, Vanraure Hachinohe for upcoming 2023 season.

== Career statistics ==
Last update: end of the 2022 season.

Club performance			League		Cup		League Cup		Continental		Other		Total	
Season	Club	League	Apps	Goals	Apps	Goals	Apps	Goals	Apps	Goals	Apps	Goals	Apps	Goals
Japan			League		Emperor's Cup		League Cup		Asia		Super Cup		Total	
2015	Gamba Osaka	J1	0	0	0	0	1	0	0	0	0	0	1	0
2016	Gamba Osaka	J1	0	0	0	0	0	0	0	0	0	0	0	0
2017	Gamba Osaka	J1	0	0	0	0	0	0	0	0	-		0	0
2018	Gamba Osaka	J1	0	0	1	0	1	1	-		-		2	1
2019	Nagano Parceiro	J3	11	1	1	0	0	0	0	0	0	0	12	1
2020	Nagano Parceiro	J3	4	0	0	0	0	0	0	0	0	0	4	0
2021	Gainare Tottori	J3	13	2	1	0	0	0	0	0	0	0	14	2
2022	Gainare Tottori	J3	18	2	1	0	0	0	0	0	0	0	19	1
2023	Vanraure Hachinohe	J3	0	0	0	0	1	0	0	0	0	0	1	0
Career total			46	5	4	0	2	1	0	0	0	0	52	6

Reserves performance

Club performance			League		Total	
Season	Club	League	Apps	Goals	Apps	Goals
Japan			League		Total	
2016	Gamba Osaka U-23	J3	29	3	29	3
2017	Gamba Osaka U-23	J3	18	3	18	3
2018	Gamba Osaka U-23	J3	27	6	27	6
Career total			74	12	74	12
