= Leo Takae =

Japanese footballer

Leo Takae 髙江 麗央
Personal information
- Date of birth: 27 June 1998 (age 28)
- Place of birth: Kumamoto, Japan
- Height: 1.71 m (5 ft 7 1/2 in)
- Position: Midfielder

Team information
- Current team: Yokohama FC
- Number: 77

Youth career
- Sorriso Kumamoto
- Kumamoto United SC
- 2011–2013: Roasso Kumamoto
- 2014–2016: Higashi Fukuoka High School

Senior career*
Years	Team	Apps	(Gls)
2017–2020	Gamba Osaka U-23	58	(3)
2017–2020	Gamba Osaka	9	(0)
2020	→ Machida Zelvia (loan)	41	(3)
2021–2023	Machida Zelvia	98	(1)
2023–2025	Montedio Yamagata	71	(3)
2025–	Yokohama FC	20	(0)
- * Club domestic league appearances and goals as of 14 August 2026

Leo Takae (髙江 麗央, Takae Leo; born june 27, 1998) is a Japanese football player who currently plays for Yokohama FC in the J1 League.

== Career ==
After graduating from Higashi Fukuoka High School in his native Kyushu, Takae signed his first professional contract with Gamba Osaka ahead of the 2017 season. He didn't feature for Gamba's first team during his debut campaign but did score 2 goals in 30 appearances for Gamba Under-23 in the J3 League.

2018 saw him get more first team action, he made his J1 debut in the Osaka derby match at home to Cerezo Osaka on 21 April. The match finished in a 1-0 win for Gamba as a result of Hwang Ui-jo's first half penalty. Takae played the full 90 minutes. He went on to play a total of 9 times in the league and 7 times in the J.League Cup during the 2018 season while also having time to play 16 games for Gamba Under-23 as they finished 6th in J3 League.

== Career statistics ==
Last update: 2 December 2018

Club performance			League		Cup		League Cup		Continental		Other		Total	
Season	Club	League	Apps	Goals	Apps	Goals	Apps	Goals	Apps	Goals	Apps	Goals	Apps	Goals
Japan			League		Emperor's Cup		League Cup		Asia				Total	
2017	Gamba Osaka	J1	0	0	0	0	0	0	0	0	-		0	0
2018	Gamba Osaka	J1	9	0	0	0	7	0	-		-		16	0
2019	Gamba Osaka	J1	0	0	0	0	0	0	-		-		0	0
Career total			9	0	0	0	7	0	-		-		16	0

== Reserves performance ==
Last Updated: 2 December 2018

Club performance			League		Total	
Season	Club	League	Apps	Goals	Apps	Goals
Japan			League		Total	
2017	Gamba Osaka U-23	J3	30	2	30	2
2018	Gamba Osaka U-23	J3	16	0	16	0
2019	Gamba Osaka U-23	J3	0	0	0	0
Career total			46	2	46	2
