= 2018 Gamba Osaka U-23 season =

Gamba Osaka U-23
2018 season
- Manager: Tsuneyasu Miyamoto; Noritada Saneyoshi
- Stadium: Panasonic Stadium Suita
- J3 League: 6th

2018 Gamba Osaka U-23 season.

== J3 League ==
Match	Date	Team	Score	Team	Venue	Attendance
1	2018.03.11	Gamba Osaka U-23	3-2	Grulla Morioka	Panasonic Stadium Suita	1,330
2	2018.03.17	Kagoshima United FC	4-1	Gamba Osaka U-23	Kagoshima Kamoike Stadium	2,223
3	2018.03.21	Gamba Osaka U-23	2-1	Blaublitz Akita	Panasonic Stadium Suita	1,224
4	2018.03.25	YSCC Yokohama	0-0	Gamba Osaka U-23	NHK Spring Mitsuzawa Football Stadium	1,509
5	2018.04.01	Gamba Osaka U-23	4-1	Fujieda MYFC	Panasonic Stadium Suita	1,398
6	2018.04.08	Kataller Toyama	3-0	Gamba Osaka U-23	Toyama Stadium	1,704
7	2018.04.15	Gamba Osaka U-23	1-1	AC Nagano Parceiro	Panasonic Stadium Suita	1,575
9	2018.05.03	FC Ryukyu	2-1	Gamba Osaka U-23	Okinawa Athletic Park Stadium	1,824
10	2018.05.06	Gamba Osaka U-23	3-0	Azul Claro Numazu	Expo '70 Commemorative Stadium	1,254
11	2018.05.20	Giravanz Kitakyushu	0-4	Gamba Osaka U-23	Mikuni World Stadium Kitakyushu	4,363
8	2018.05.26	Gamba Osaka U-23	2-4	FC Tokyo U-23	Panasonic Stadium Suita	1,596
12	2018.06.02	Cerezo Osaka U-23	1-1	Gamba Osaka U-23	Yanmar Stadium Nagai	4,551
13	2018.06.10	Gamba Osaka U-23	1-1	Fukushima United FC	Expo '70 Commemorative Stadium	974
14	2018.06.16	Gainare Tottori	1-0	Gamba Osaka U-23	Tottori Bank Bird Stadium	2,456
16	2018.06.30	SC Sagamihara	2-3	Gamba Osaka U-23	Sagamihara Gion Stadium	3,256
18	2018.07.16	Gamba Osaka U-23	0-0	Kagoshima United FC	Panasonic Stadium Suita	1,054
19	2018.07.22	Grulla Morioka	2-1	Gamba Osaka U-23	Kitakami Stadium	3,115
15	2018.08.18	Gamba Osaka U-23	4-0	Thespakusatsu Gunma	Panasonic Stadium Suita	1,050
20	2018.08.26	Gamba Osaka U-23	3-0	YSCC Yokohama	Panasonic Stadium Suita	568
21	2018.09.02	Thespakusatsu Gunma	1-0	Gamba Osaka U-23	Shoda Shoyu Stadium Gunma	3,358
23	2018.09.15	Gamba Osaka U-23	2-0	FC Ryukyu	Panasonic Stadium Suita	804
24	2018.09.23	Blaublitz Akita	1-1	Gamba Osaka U-23	Akita Yabase Athletic Field	3,418
25	2018.09.30	FC Tokyo U-23	2-2	Gamba Osaka U-23	Ajinomoto Field Nishigaoka	1,178
26	2018.10.07	Gamba Osaka U-23	2-0	Gainare Tottori	Panasonic Stadium Suita	1,778
27	2018.10.13	Fujieda MYFC	2-1	Gamba Osaka U-23	Fujieda Soccer Stadium	945
28	2018.10.21	Azul Claro Numazu	1-2	Gamba Osaka U-23	Ashitaka Park Stadium	4,041
29	2018.10.28	Gamba Osaka U-23	2-1	SC Sagamihara	Panasonic Stadium Suita	1,310
30	2018.11.04	Gamba Osaka U-23	1-1	Kataller Toyama	Panasonic Stadium Suita	1,105
31	2018.11.11	AC Nagano Parceiro	2-1	Gamba Osaka U-23	Nagano U Stadium	2,828
32	2018.11.18	Fukushima United FC	4-3	Gamba Osaka U-23	Toho Stadium	1,055
33	2018.11.25	Gamba Osaka U-23	2-1	Giravanz Kitakyushu	Panasonic Stadium Suita	1,334
34	2018.12.02	Gamba Osaka U-23	0-2	Cerezo Osaka U-23	Panasonic Stadium Suita	3,753
