= Naoya Takahashi =

Japanese footballer

Naoya Takahashi 髙橋 直也
Personal information
- Date of birth: 28 May 2001 (age 25)
- Place of birth: Osaka, Japan
- Height: 1.79 m (5 ft 10 in)
- Position: Midfielder

Team information
- Current team: Shonan Bellmare
- Number: 33

Youth career
- ACBS SC
- –2019: Gamba Osaka

College career
Years	Team	Apps	(Gls)
2020–2023	Kansai University		

Senior career*
Years	Team	Apps	(Gls)
2018–2019	Gamba Osaka U-23	11	(0)
2023–	Shonan Bellmare	35	(0)
- * Club domestic league appearances and goals as of 14 August 2026

Naoya Takahashi (髙橋 直也, Takahashi Naoya; born 28 May 2001) is a Japanese professional footballer who plays as a midfielder for Shonan Bellmare.

== Club statistics ==
As of 10 November 2019.

Club	Season	League			National Cup		League Cup		Other		Total	
Club	Season	Division	Apps	Goals	Apps	Goals	Apps	Goals	Apps	Goals	Apps	Goals
Gamba Osaka U-23	2018	J3 League	0	0	–		–		0	0	0	0
Gamba Osaka U-23	2019	J3 League	11	0	–		–		0	0	11	0
Career total			11	0	0	0	0	0	0	0	11	0
