= Mizuki Ichimaru =

Japanese footballer

Mizuki Ichimaru 市丸 瑞希
Personal information
- Full name: Mizuki Ichimaru
- Date of birth: 8 May 1997 (age 29)
- Place of birth: Ibaraki, Osaka, Japan
- Height: 1.74 m (5 ft 9 in)
- Position: Midfielder

Team information
- Current team: FC SONHO Kawanishi
- Number: 17

Youth career
- 2010−2015: Gamba Osaka

Senior career*
Years	Team	Apps	(Gls)
2016–2019	Gamba Osaka U-23	58	(1)
2016−2020	Gamba Osaka	5	(0)
2019	→ FC Gifu (loan)	14	(0)
2020	→ FC Ryukyu (loan)	27	(0)
2021	FC Ryukyu	10	(0)
2022	Vonds Ichihara	4	(0)
2023–	FC SONHO Kawanishi	0	(0)

International career
2017	Japan U-20	3	(0)
Medal record
Gamba Osaka
Runner-up	J.League Cup	2016
Representing Japan
AFC U-19 Championship
Gold medal – first place	2016 Bahrain
- * Club domestic league appearances and goals as of 21:37, 21 August 2023 (UTC)

Mizuki Ichimaru (市丸 瑞希, Ichimaru Mizuki) is a Japanese footballer who plays as a central midfielder for FC SONHO Kawanishi.

== Club career ==
Born and raised in Osaka, Ichimaru came through the youth ranks at Gamba Osaka and earned his first professional contract ahead of the 2016 season. He didn't see any game time for Gamba's first team in J1 League, however he made 21 appearances for Gamba Osaka in J3 League to help them to a 9th place finish in the final table.

2017 saw him make his J1 debut in a 2-0 home defeat to Júbilo Iwata on 13 August 2017. He started the match in central midfield and was subbed by Shun Nagasawa after 76 minutes. That was to be his only league appearance that year and coupled with 3 matches in the cups, he played a total of 4 games in 2017.

In 2018 he started the first four matches of the season under new head coach Levir Culpi before injury forced him to take a spell on the sidelines and he was unable to regain his place under new manager Tsuneyasu Miyamoto, who replaced Culpi halfway through the year. He found himself spending most of the rest of 2018 playing once again for Gamba U-23 in J3 where he made 20 appearances to help them to 6th in the final standings.

At the end of the 2022 season after making only four appearances for Kantō Soccer League club Vonds Ichihara, Ichimaru announced his retirement aged 25. However, his retirement was short-lived as only two weeks later it was announced that he would be joining FC SONHO Kawanishi.

== National team career ==
In May 2017, Ichimaru was elected Japan U-20 national team for 2017 U-20 World Cup. At this tournament, he played 3 matches as defensive midfielder.

== Club statistics ==
Last update: 1 May 2019

Club performance			League		Cup		League Cup		Continental		Other		Total	
Season	Club	League	Apps	Goals	Apps	Goals	Apps	Goals	Apps	Goals	Apps	Goals	Apps	Goals
Japan			League		Emperor's Cup		League Cup		Asia		Super Cup		Total	
2016	Gamba Osaka	J1	0	0	0	0	0	0	0	0	0	0	0	0
2017	Gamba Osaka	J1	1	0	1	0	2	0	0	0	-		4	0
2018	Gamba Osaka	J1	4	0	0	0	5	0	-		-		9	0
2019	Gamba Osaka	J1	0	0	0	0	0	0	-		-		0	0
Career total			5	0	1	0	7	0	0	0	0	0	13	0

== Reserves performance ==
Club performance			League		Total	
Season	Club	League	Apps	Goals	Apps	Goals
Japan			League		Total	
2016	Gamba Osaka U-23	J3	21	0	21	0
2018	Gamba Osaka U-23	J3	20	0	20	0
2019	Gamba Osaka U-23	J3	7	0	7	0
Career total			48	0	48	0
