= Jin Izumisawa =

Japanese footballer (born 1991)

Jin Izumisawa 泉澤 仁
Personal information
- Full name: Jin Izumisawa
- Date of birth: 17 December 1991 (age 34)
- Place of birth: Urayasu, Chiba, Japan
- Height: 1.65 m (5 ft 5 in)
- Positions: Midfielder; winger

Team information
- Current team: FC Gifu
- Number: 39

Youth career
- FC Trim
- 2004–2006: Kashiwa Reysol
- 2007–2009: Albirex Niigata

College career
Years	Team	Apps	(Gls)
2010–2013	Hannan University		

Senior career*
Years	Team	Apps	(Gls)
2014–2016	Omiya Ardija	87	(10)
2017–2018	Gamba Osaka	24	(2)
2018	Gamba Osaka U-23	8	(2)
2018	→ Tokyo Verdy (loan)	17	(3)
2019	Pogoń Szczecin	1	(1)
2019	Pogoń Szczecin II	1	(0)
2019–2020	Yokohama F. Marinos	0	(0)
2020	→ Ventforet Kofu (loan)	28	(3)
2021–2022	Ventforet Kofu	26	(10)
2022–2024	Omiya Ardija	61	(5)
2025–	FC Gifu	51	(4)
- * Club domestic league appearances and goals as of 17 August 2026

Jin Izumisawa (泉澤 仁, Izumisawa Jin; born 17 December 1991) is a Japanese professional footballer who plays as a midfielder for J3 League club FC Gifu.

== Career ==
One of the best Kansai prospects, from July to December 2013 he has been selected as J. League designated player by Omiya Ardija. Then in 2014 he entered in the regular squad of the Squirrels.

After the relegation suffered by the club of Saitama in 2014, the new manager Hiroki Shibuya gave him a lot more space on the field. He wears the number 39 because three plus nine makes twelve, which is usually the number associated with fans.

== Career statistics ==
Updated to 10 December 2018.

Club performance			League		Cup		League Cup		Continental		Total	
Season	Club	League	Apps	Goals	Apps	Goals	Apps	Goals	Apps	Goals	Apps	Goals
Japan			League		Emperor's Cup		J. League Cup		Asia		Total	
2014	Omiya Ardija	J1	0	0	0	0	0	0	-		0	0
2014	Omiya Ardija	J1	16	0	3	0	4	0	-		23	0
2015	Omiya Ardija	J2	41	7	3	2	-		-		44	9
2016	Omiya Ardija	J1	30	3	4	3	7	0	-		41	6
Total			87	10	10	5	11	0	-		108	15
2017	Gamba Osaka	J1	21	2	3	2	4	2	6	0	34	6
2018	Gamba Osaka	J1	3	0	0	0	3	0	-		6	0
Total			24	2	3	2	7	2	6	0	40	6
2018	Tokyo Verdy	J2	17	3	0	0	-		-		17	3
Total			17	3	0	0	-		-		17	3
Career total			128	15	13	7	18	2	6	0	165	24

Reserves performance

Last Updated: 10 March 2018

Club performance			League		Total	
Season	Club	League	Apps	Goals	Apps	Goals
Japan			League		Total	
2018	Gamba Osaka U-23	J3	7	2	7	2
Career total			7	2	7	2
