= Takahiro Ko =

Japanese footballer

Takahiro Ko 高 宇洋
Personal information
- Full name: Takahiro Ko
- Date of birth: April 20, 1998 (age 28)
- Place of birth: Kawasaki, Kanagawa, Japan
- Height: 1.72 m (5 ft 7 1/2 in)
- Position: Midfielder

Team information
- Current team: FC Tokyo
- Number: 8

Youth career
- 2006: FC Nakahara
- 2007–2013: Kawasaki Frontale
- 2014–2016: Ichiritsu Funabashi High School

Senior career*
Years	Team	Apps	(Gls)
2017–2019	→ Gamba Osaka U-23 (loan)	51	(3)
2017–2019	Gamba Osaka	18	(0)
2019–2020	Renofa Yamaguchi	53	(1)
2021–2023	Albirex Niigata	111	(3)
2024–	FC Tokyo	59	(4)
- * Club domestic league appearances and goals as of 13 September 2025

Takahiro Ko (高 宇洋, Kō Takahiro; born April 20, 1998) is a Japanese professional footballer who plays as a central midfielder for J1 League club FC Tokyo. He is the son of former Chinese international Gao Sheng.

== Career ==
After graduating from Ichiritsu Funabashi High School in Chiba, Ko signed his first professional contract with Gamba Osaka ahead of the 2017 season. He didn't feature for Gamba's senior side during his debut campaign, but played 28 times in J3 for Gamba U-23.

2018 was a more productive year and he started off captaining Gamba U-23, playing a total of 20 games and scoring 3 times. However, he spent most of the latter half of the year with Gamba's J1 side following the promotion of Gamba U-23 head coach Tsuneyasu Miyamoto. He made his J1 League debut in Miyamoto's first match as manager, a 1–1 draw at home to Kashima Antlers on July 28 and made a total of 12 league appearances that year. In addition he also played once in the J.League Cup in the quarter-final tie against Yokohama F. Marinos.

== Career statistics ==
As of 11 March 2025

Appearances and goals by club, season and competition
Club	Season	League			Cup		League Cup		Total	
Club	Season	Division	Apps	Goals	Apps	Goals	Apps	Goals	Apps	Goals
Japan			League		Emperor's Cup		J. League Cup		Total	
Gamba Osaka	2017	J1 League	0	0	0	0	0	0	0	0
Gamba Osaka	2018	J1 League	12	0	0	0	1	0	13	0
Gamba Osaka	2019	J1 League	6	0	0	0	6	0	12	0
Gamba Osaka	Total		18	0	0	0	7	0	25	0
Gamba Osaka U-23 (loan)	2017	J3 League	28	0	0	0	–		28	0
Gamba Osaka U-23 (loan)	2018	J3 League	20	3	0	0	–		20	3
Gamba Osaka U-23 (loan)	2019	J3 League	3	0	0	0	–		3	0
Gamba Osaka U-23 (loan)	Total		51	3	0	0	0	0	51	3
Renofa Yamaguchi	2019	J2 League	12	0	0	0	–		12	0
Renofa Yamaguchi	2020	J2 League	41	1	0	0	–		41	1
Renofa Yamaguchi	Total		53	1	0	0	0	0	53	1
Albirex Niigata	2021	J2 League	41	1	2	0	–		43	1
Albirex Niigata	2022	J2 League	39	1	0	0	–		39	1
Albirex Niigata	2023	J1 League	31	1	2	0	2	0	35	1
Albirex Niigata	Total		111	3	4	0	2	0	117	3
FC Tokyo	2024	J1 League	35	3	1	0	3	0	39	3
FC Tokyo	2025	J1 League	5	0	0	0	0	0	5	0
FC Tokyo	Total		40	3	1	0	3	0	44	3
Career total			273	7	4	0	9	0	290	10

== Honours ==
Albirex Niigata

- J2 League : 2022

Individual

- J2 League Best XI: 2022
