= Ryota Suzuki (footballer) =

Japanese footballer

Personal information
- Date of birth: 10 February 1994 (age 32)
- Place of birth: Aichi, Japan
- Height: 1.91 m (6 ft 3 in)
- Position: Goalkeeper

Team information
- Current team: JEF United Chiba
- Number: 23

Youth career
- 2009–2011: Yokohama F. Marinos

Senior career*
Years	Team	Apps	(Gls)
2012–2016	Yokohama F. Marinos	0	(0)
2014	→ J.League U-22 Selection (loan)	3	(0)
2016	→ Tokyo Verdy (loan)	24	(0)
2017–2019	Gamba Osaka	0	(0)
2018	→ Gamba Osaka U-23 (loan)	11	(0)
2019	→ JEF United Chiba (loan)	16	(0)
2020–	JEF United Chiba	45	(0)
Medal record
Yokohama F. Marinos
Runner-up	J1 League	2013
Winner	Emperor's Cup	2013
- * Club domestic league appearances and goals as of 12 August 2026

Ryota Suzuki (鈴木 椋大, Suzuki Ryōta; born 10 February 1994 in Aichi) is a Japanese football goalkeeper who currently plays for JEF United Chiba in the J2 League. He has previously had spells with Yokohama F. Marinos, Tokyo Verdy and Gamba Osaka.

== Club career statistics ==
Updated to 26 November 2023.

Club	Season	League			Cup		League Cup		Continental		Other		Total	
Club	Season	Division	Apps	Goals	Apps	Goals	Apps	Goals	Apps	Goals	Apps	Goals	Apps	Goals
Yokohama F. Marinos	2012	J1 League	0	0	0	0	0	0	-		-		0	0
Yokohama F. Marinos	2013	J1 League	0	0	0	0	0	0	-		-		0	0
Yokohama F. Marinos	2014	J1 League	0	0	0	0	0	0	0	0	-		0	0
Yokohama F. Marinos	2015	J1 League	0	0	0	0	1	0	-		-		1	0
Yokohama F. Marinos	Total		0	0	0	0	1	0	0	0	0	0	1	0
Tokyo Verdy	2016	J2 League	24	0	3	0	-		-		-		27	0
Gamba Osaka	2017	J1 League	0	0	0	0	0	0	1	0	-		1	0
Gamba Osaka	2018	J1 League	0	0	0	0	1	0	-		-		1	0
Gamba Osaka	Total		0	0	0	0	1	0	1	0	0	0	2	0
JEF United Chiba (loan)	2019	J2 League	16	0	0	0	-		-		-		16	0
JEF United Chiba	2020	J2 League	0	0	-		-		-		-		0	0
JEF United Chiba	2021	J2 League	5	0	2	0	-		-		-		7	0
JEF United Chiba	2022	J2 League	0	0	0	0	-		-		-		0	0
JEF United Chiba	2023	J2 League	20	0	1	0	-		-		1	0	22	0
JEF United Chiba	Total		41	0	3	0	0	0	0	0	1	0	45	0
Career Total			65	0	6	0	2	0	1	0	1	0	75	0

Reserves performance

Last Updated: 2 December 2018

Club performance			League		Total	
Season	Club	League	Apps	Goals	Apps	Goals
Japan			League		Total	
2018	Gamba Osaka U-23	J3	11	0	11	0
Career total			11	0	11	0

== Achievements ==
- Emperor's Cup (1): 2013
