= Kazunari Ichimi =

Japanese footballer (born 1997)

Kazunari Ichimi 一美 和成
Personal information
- Full name: Kazunari Ichimi
- Date of birth: 10 November 1997 (age 29)
- Place of birth: Yatsushiro, Kumamoto, Japan
- Height: 1.83 m (6 ft 0 in)
- Position: Forward

Team information
- Current team: Tokyo Verdy
- Number: 33

Youth career
- –2012: Esperanza Kumamoto
- 2013–2015: Ohzu High School

Senior career*
Years	Team	Apps	(Gls)
2016–2021	Gamba Osaka	27	(1)
2016–2018	→ Gamba Osaka U-23 (loan)	75	(19)
2019	→ Kyoto Sanga (loan)	36	(17)
2020	→ Yokohama FC (loan)	31	(4)
2021–2022	Tokushima Vortis	37	(9)
2023–2024	Kyoto Sanga	25	(0)
2024–2026	Fagiano Okayama	60	(6)
2026–	Tokyo Verdy	2	(0)

International career
2019	Japan U-22	1	(0)
Medal record
Gamba Osaka
Runner-up	J.League Cup	2016
- * Club domestic league appearances and goals as of 11:06, 5 October 2026 (UTC)

Kazunari Ichimi (一美 和成, Ichimi Kazunari; born November 10, 1997) is a Japanese footballer who plays as a forward and who plays for J1 League club Tokyo Verdy.

== Career ==
=== Gamba Osaka ===
Ichimi made his league debut against Kawasaki Frontale on 1 September 2018. On 9 August 2018, he scored his first goal for the club against Yokohama F. Marinos. On 6 October 2018, he made his debut derby appearance against Cerezo Osaka.

=== Loan to Kyoto Sanga ===
On 7 April 2019, Ichimi scored two goals in his first start for the club. He scored his fourth goal for the club against Renofa Yamaguchi on 25 May 2019.

=== Loan to Yokohama FC ===
On 4 January 2021, it was announced that Ichimi would return to Gamba Osaka when his loan expired.

=== Tokushima Vortis ===
On 11 August 2021, Ichimi was announced at Tokushima Vortis.

=== Second spell at Kyoto Sanga ===
On 6 December 2022, Ichimi was announced at Kyoto Sanga. He made his league debut against Kashima Antlers on 18 February 2023.

=== Fagiano Okayama ===
On 19 July 2024, Ichimi was announce official transfer to J2 club, Fagiano Okayama for mid 2024 season. He made his league debut against Montedio Yamagata on 3 August 2024. On 7 December 2024, Ichimi was brought his club secure promotion to J1 League for the first time in their history from next season after defeat Vegalta Sendai 2-0 in promotion play-off final.

== Career statistics ==
=== Club ===
As of 5 October 2026.

Appearances and goals by club, season and competition
Club	Season	League			National cup (Note: Includes Emperor's Cup)		League cup (Note: Includes J.League Cup)		Continental		Other		Total	
Club	Season	Division	Apps	Goals	Apps	Goals	Apps	Goals	Apps	Goals	Apps	Goals	Apps	Goals
Gamba Osaka	2018	J1 League	9	0	0	0	2	1	0	0	0	0	11	1
Gamba Osaka	2021	J1 League	18	1	1	0	0	0	3 (Note: Appearances in AFC Champions League Elite)	1	1 (Note: Appearance in Japanese Super Cup)	0	23	2
Gamba Osaka	Total		27	1	1	0	0	0	3	1	1	0	34	3
Gamba Osaka U-23 (loan)	2016	J3 League	29	3	–		–		–		–		29	3
Gamba Osaka U-23 (loan)	2017	J3 League	25	8	–		–		–		–		25	8
Gamba Osaka U-23 (loan)	2018	J3 League	21	8	–		–		–		–		21	8
Gamba Osaka U-23 (loan)	Total		75	19	0	0	0	0	0	0	0	0	75	19
Kyoto Sanga (loan)	2019	J2 League	36	17	0	0	0	0	–		–		36	17
Yokohama FC (loan)	2020	J1 League	31	4	–		3	0	–		–		34	4
Tokushima Vortis	2021	J1 League	12	2	0	0	0	0	–		–		12	2
Tokushima Vortis	2022	J2 League	25	7	0	0	0	0	–		–		25	7
Tokushima Vortis	Total		37	9	0	0	0	0	0	0	0	0	37	9
Kyoto Sanga	2023	J1 League	13	0	0	0	2	1	–		–		15	1
Kyoto Sanga	2024	J1 League	12	0	2	0	1	0	–		–		15	0
Kyoto Sanga	Total		25	0	2	0	3	1	0	0	0	0	30	1
Fagiano Okayama	2024	J2 League	11	1	0	0	0	0	–		2 (Note: Appearance in J1/J2 play-offs)	0	13	1
Fagiano Okayama	2025	J1 League	32	5	1	0	1	0	–		0	0	34	5
Fagiano Okayama	2026	J1 (100)	14	0	–		–		–		0	0	14	0
Fagiano Okayama	2026–27	J1 League	3	0	0	0	0	0	–		0	0	3	0
Fagiano Okayama	Total		60	6	1	0	1	0	0	0	2	0	64	6
Tokyo Verdy	2026–27	J1 League	2	0	–		0	0	–		–		2	0
Career total			293	56	4	0	9	2	3	1	3	0	312	59

== Honours ==
Fagiano Okayama

- J2 League Promotion play-off winner: 2024
