= Fábio Aguiar =

Brazilian footballer (born 1989)

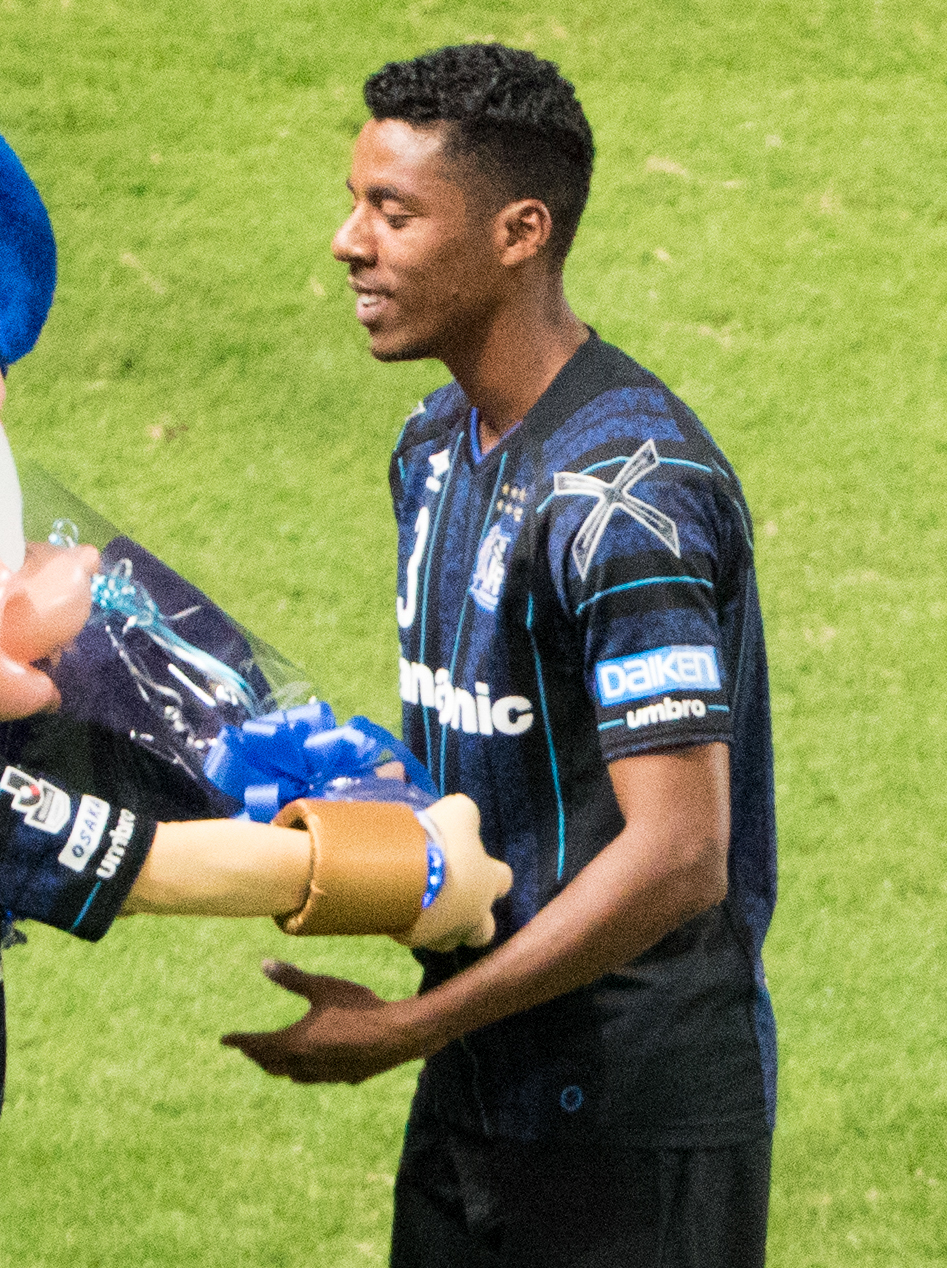

Personal information
- Full name: Fábio Aguiar da Silva
- Date of birth: 28 February 1989 (age 37)
- Place of birth: Bom Jardim, Maranhão, Brazil
- Height: 1.86 m (6 ft 1 in)
- Position: Centre-back

Team information
- Current team: ASA

Senior career*
Years	Team	Apps	(Gls)
2009–2010	Tigres do Brasil	8	(0)
2011–2012	Duque de Caxias	13	(1)
2012	Jacuipense	0	(0)
2012	SC Sagamihara	5	(1)
2013–2016	Yokohama F. Marinos	112	(10)
2017–2018	Gamba Osaka	70	(5)
2019	Júbilo Iwata	3	(0)
2021	Sampaio Corrêa	0	(0)
2022	ASA	7	(0)
2022	Altos	3	(0)
2023	ASA	10	(1)
2023–2026	Sampaio Corrêa	36	(2)
2026–	ASA	15	(1)
- * Club domestic league appearances and goals as of 19 November 2026

Fábio Aguiar da Silva (born 28 February 1989) is a Brazilian professional footballer who plays as a defender for ASA.

== Career ==
=== Yokohama F. Marinos ===
In 2013 Fábio signed for Japanese J. League Division 1 side Yokohama F. Marinos for the season and he made his debut for the club on 20 March 2013 in the J. League Cup against Kawasaki Frontale in which he started and played the full 90 as Yokohama went on to win the match 1–0.

== Career statistics ==
As of match played 9 September 2026.

Appearances and goals by club, season and competition
Club	Season	League			State League		Cup		League Cup		Continental		Other		Total	
Club	Season	Division	Apps	Goals	Apps	Goals	Apps	Goals	Apps	Goals	Apps	Goals	Apps	Goals	Apps	Goals
Tigres do Brasil	2009	Carioca	—		5	0	—		—		—		—		5	0
Tigres do Brasil	2010	Carioca	—		3	0	—		—		—		—		3	0
Tigres do Brasil	Total		—		8	0	—		—		—		—		8	0
Duque de Caxias	2011	Série B	2	0	—		—		—		—		—		2	0
Duque de Caxias	2012	Série C	—		12	1	—		—		—		—		12	1
Duque de Caxias	Total		2	0	12	1	—		—		—		—		14	1
SC Sagamihara	2012	Kantō League	5	1	—		—		—		—		—		5	1
Yokohama F. Marinos	2013	J. League Division 1	14	1	—		4	0	9	0	—		—		27	1
Yokohama F. Marinos	2014	J. League Division 1	11	0	—		2	0	2	0	3	0	—		18	0
Yokohama F. Marinos	2015	J. League Division 1	33	4	—		3	0	5	2	—		—		41	6
Yokohama F. Marinos	2016	J. League Division 1	23	3	—		0	0	3	0	—		—		26	3
Yokohama F. Marinos	Total		81	8	—		9	0	19	2	3	0	—		112	10
Gamba Osaka	2017	J. League Division 1	22	1	—		1	1	2	0	7	0	—		32	2
Gamba Osaka	2018	J1 League	31	3	—		1	0	6	0	—		—		38	3
Gamba Osaka	Total		53	4	—		2	1	8	0	7	0	—		70	5
Júbilo Iwata	2019	J1 League	3	0	—		0	0	0	0	—		—		3	0
ASA	2022	Série D	1	0	6	0	—		—		—		—		7	0
Altos	2022	Série C	3	0	—		2	0	—		—		—		5	0
ASA	2023	Série D	—		10	1	1	0	—		—		1	0	12	1
Sampaio Corrêa	2023	Série B	8	1	—		—		—		—		—		8	1
Sampaio Corrêa	2024	Série C	8	0	7	0	2	0	—		—		1	0	18	0
Sampaio Corrêa	2025	Série D	4	0	9	1	1	0	—		—		6	0	20	1
Sampaio Corrêa	Total		20	1	16	1	3	0	—		—		7	0	46	2
ASA	2026	Série D	0	0	11	1	1	0	—		—		2	0	14	1
Career total			168	14	63	4	18	1	27	2	10	0	10	0	296	21

== Honours ==
Yokohama F. Marinos

- Emperor's Cup: 2013
