= Gamba Osaka U-23 =

- Full name: Gamba Osaka Under-23
- Founded: 2016
- Dissolved: 2020
- Ground: Panasonic Stadium Suita; Expo '70 Commemorative Stadium
- Capacity: 39,694; 21,000
- Owner: Panasonic
- Chairman: Takashi Yamauchi
- League: J3 League
- 2020: 14th
- Website: http://www.gamba-osaka.net
Home colours	Away colours

Gamba Osaka Under−23 was a Japanese football team based in Suita, Osaka. It was the reserve team of Gamba Osaka and played in J3 League which they have done since their entry to the league at the beginning of the 2016 season. They played the majority of their home games at Panasonic Stadium Suita with some played at Expo '70 Commemorative Stadium.

== History ==
Gamba joined J3 League in 2016 along with the reserve teams of neighbours Cerezo Osaka and also FC Tokyo. None of these clubs are eligible for promotion to J2 League additionally they can only name 3 outfield players over the age of 23 in any one match. Gamba played their first J3 game on 13 March 2016, a 0–0 draw at home to YSCC Yokohama in front of 3,359 spectators.

== League record ==
Season	Division	Tier	Teams	Pos.	GP	W	D	L	F	A	GD	Pts	Attendance/G	Top scorer
2016	J3	3	16	9th	30	10	8	12	42	41	1	38	2,401	Ritsu Doan 10
2017	J3	3	17	16th	32	7	5	20	31	65	-34	26	1,226	Kazunari Ichimi 8
2018	J3	3	17	6th	32	13	8	11	53	43	10	47	1,382	Kazunari Ichimi 8
2019	J3	3	18	17th	34	9	8	17	54	55	-1	35	1,263	Shoji Toyama 10
2020 †	J3	3	18	14th	34	9	8	17	43	55	-12	35	595	Shoji Toyama 10

Key

- Pos. = Position in league; GP = Games played; W = Games won; D = Games drawn; L = Games lost; F = Goals scored; A = Goals conceded; GD = Goals difference; Pts = Points gained
- Attendance/G = Average league home attendance
- † 2020 season attendance reduced by COVID-19 worldwide pandemic.
