= 2019 Gamba Osaka season =

Gamba Osaka
2019 season
- Chairman: Takashi Yamauchi
- Manager: Tsuneyasu Miyamoto
- J1 League: 7th
- Emperor's Cup: 3rd round
- J.League Cup: Semi-final
- Top goalscorer: League: Ademilson 10; All: Ademilson 12
- Highest home attendance: 37,334 vs Júbilo Iwata 18 Aug
- Lowest home attendance: 3,543 vs Kamatamare Sanuki 3 July
- Average home league attendance: 27,708
Home colours	Away colours

The 2019 Gamba Osaka season was Gamba Osaka's 26th season in the J1 League and 32nd overall in the Japanese top flight. It saw them compete in the 18 team J1 League as well as the J.League Cup and Emperor's Cup competitions.

== Transfers ==
Prior to the end of 2018, Gamba completed the signing of Kwansei Gakuin University fullback, Ryu Takao, who impressed in his side's shock win over Gamba in the Emperor's Cup in June. He was joined by young midfielder Kohei Okuno, who signed a full-time deal after spending 2 years with Gamba's Under-23 side in J3 League. It was also announced that Kansai University left-back Keisuke Kurokawa would join the club as a designated special player before signing permanently once he concluded his university studies in 2020.

Roasso Kumamoto wide midfielder / wing-back, Tatsuya Tanaka was next to join, having performed well in a team that was relegated from J2 the previous season. Central midfielder Shinya Yajima returned from a loan spell with Vegalta Sendai where he spent the second half of the 2018 campaign while forward Hiroto Goya came back from J2 side Tokushima Vortis having only played 7 games due to injury. Goalkeeper Ken Tajiri also returned to the club following an 18-month loan spell with Zweigen Kanazawa.

In a surprise move, defender Naoyaki Aoyama joined the club following 4 seasons in Thailand with Muangthong United. Aoyama previously played with Shimizu S-Pulse, Yokohama F. Marinos and Ventforet Kofu in Japan. After his country's elimination from the 2019 AFC Asian Cup it was announced that South Korean defender Kim Young-gwon would sign from Chinese club Guangzhou Evergrande. He previously had spells in Japan with FC Tokyo and Omiya Ardija between 2010 and 2012.

At half time of the week 3 J.League fixture at home to Nagoya Grampus, it was announced that Spanish winger David Concha would join the club on loan from Real Sociedad. He was handed the number 11 jersey.

In mid-December, it was announced that defenders Fabio and Takaharu Nishino as well as midfielders Naoya Senoo and Yuto Mori had been released. Fabio played 31 times in J1 League during 2018, however Nishino, Senoo and Mori spent the majority of the season with Gamba U-23 in J3. Later on in December versatile full-back Ryo Hatsuse left for Vissel Kobe, he had filled in at left back during Hiroki Fujiharu's injury during the previous season but saw out the campaign playing J3 football with Gamba U-23. Attacking midfielder Haruya Ide left for J2 outfit, Montedio Yamagata, after 2 indifferent seasons in Osaka while young Korean defender Bae Soo-yong was again loaned out, this time to J3 side Kamatamare Sanuki. Giant forward Shun Nagasawa, who spent the second half of 2018 on loan at Vissel Kobe, left permanently for Vegalta Sendai at the end of December. On the same day, it was also announced that the versatile So Hirao, who had been with Avispa Fukuoka on loan in 2018 had signed a permanent deal with J2 side Machida Zelvia.

The beginning of 2019 brought with it the surprising news that attacking midfielder Jin Izumisawa, who'd spent the second half of 2018 on loan at J2 side Tokyo Verdy, would take the next step in his career in Poland with Pogoń Szczecin. A couple of days later it was announced that 4th choice goalkeeper, Ryota Suzuki, would join J2 side JEF United Chiba on a season-long loan. On the same day, promising forward Kazunari Ichimi, who was top scorer for Gamba U-23 in 2017 and 2018 joined Kyoto Sanga on loan for 2019. Club legend Takahiro Futagawa finally departed the club permanently in mid January. The 38 year-old had spent the previous 2 seasons out on loan in J2 with Tokyo Verdy and Tochigi.

Early on in the season young forward Hiroto Goya, who found himself well down the pecking order for a starting berth, was loaned out to J2 side V-Varen Nagasaki while Gamba U-23 captain Mizuki Ichimaru headed to FC Gifu on loan at the beginning of May. At the end of May another Gamba U-23 stalwart, centre-back Hiroki Noda also left on loan, this time to J2 outfit Montedio Yamagata.

Gamba kicked off the summer transfer window with the announcement that attacking midfielder Takashi Usami would return for a third spell at the club. The 27-times capped Japanese international had spent the 2018-2019 European season on loan at Bundesliga side Fortuna Düsseldorf on loan from Augsburg. Right-sided midfielder Yuto Suzuki also came in on loan from Kawasaki Frontale in mid-July and his arrival was followed by the loan signing of Patric from Sanfrecce Hiroshima. The striker previously enjoyed 4 seasons with Gamba and scored 9 times in their title-winning season in 2014. Continuing the theme of returns, midfielder Yosuke Ideguchi also rejoined the club after an injury plagued 18 months in Europe. The following week, Renofa Yamaguchi attacker, Daisuke Takagi, became the fifth arrival of the summer.

In terms of summer departures, veteran full-back Oh Jae-suk left on loan to once again link up with former Gamba head-coach Kenta Hasegawa at FC Tokyo. Wing back Tatsuya Tanaka also left for fellow J1 side Oita Trinita, a mere 7 months after joining Gamba from Roasso Kumamoto. A few days later Korean forward Hwang Ui-jo departed for Bordeaux in France and he was followed out the exit door the following day by veteran attacking midfielder Jungo Fujimoto who joined J2 promotion chasers Kyoto Sanga on loan until the end of the season. Youngster Keito Nakamura who'd recently broken into the team playing on the left side of midfield earned a 2-year loan move to Dutch side FC Twente in mid July following in the footsteps of Ritsu Doan who joined Groningen in the Netherlands two years previously. The exodus continued when veteran midfielder Yasuyuki Konno, who had fallen out of favour in 2019, moved to J1 rivals Jubilo Iwata on a permanent deal. Young striker Akito Takagi, who bagged 11 goals in just 17 J3 games for Gamba U23 joined former team-mate Hiroki Noda on loan at J2 side Montedio Yamagata. A few days later, right full-back Koki Yonekura returned to his former club, JEF United Chiba, on loan until the end of the season. Young attacker Ryotaro Meshino later made the surprise move to English side Manchester City on a permanent deal and the following week central-midfielder, Takahiro Ko, joined J2 outfit Renofa Yamaguchi on loan until the end of the season.

=== In ===
No.	Pos	Player	Transferred From	Fee	Date	Source
27	DF	(Japan) Ryu Takao	(Japan) Kwansei Gakuin University	unknown	22 Jun 2018	
26	MF	(Japan) Kohei Okuno	(Japan) Gamba Osaka Youth	promotion	18 Oct 2018	
24	DF	(Japan) Keisuke Kurokawa	(Japan) Kansai University	designated special player	5 Dec 2018	
6	MF	(Japan) Tatsuya Tanaka	(Japan) Roasso Kumamoto	unknown	14 Dec 2018	
21	MF	(Japan) Shinya Yajima	(Japan) Vegalta Sendai	return from loan	23 Dec 2018	
20	FW	(Japan) Hiroto Goya	(Japan) Tokushima Vortis	return from loan	27 Dec 2018	
31	GK	(Japan) Ken Tajiri	(Japan) Zweigen Kanazawa	return from loan	7 Jan 2019	
30	DF	(Japan) Naoaki Aoyama	(Thailand) Muangthong United	unknown	7 Jan 2019	
19	DF	(South Korea) Kim Young-gwon	(China) Guangzhou Evergrande	unknown	26 Jan 2019	
11	MF	(Spain) David Concha	(Spain) Real Sociedad	loan	9 Mar 2019	
33	FW	(Japan) Takashi Usami	(Germany) Augsburg	unknown	24 June 2019	
17	MF	(Japan) Yuto Suzuki	(Japan) Kawasaki Frontale	loan	18 July 2019	
18	FW	(Brazil) Patric	(Japan) Sanfrecce Hiroshima	loan	25 July 2019	
15	MF	(Japan) Yosuke Ideguchi	(England) Leeds United	unknown	5 Aug 2019	
20	FW	(Japan) Daisuke Takagi	(Japan) Renofa Yamaguchi	unknown	13 Aug 2019	
28	MF	(Japan) Yuki Yamamoto	(Japan) Kwansei Gakuin University	designated special player	6 Sept 2019	
14	MF	(Spain) Markel Susaeta	unattached	unknown	9 Sept 2019	

=== Out ===
No.	Pos	Player	Transferred To	Fee	Date	Source
2	DF	(Japan) Takaharu Nishino	(Japan) Kamatamare Sanuki	free	11 Dec 2018	
3	DF	(Brazil) Fábio	released	N/A	11 Dec 2018	
26	MF	(Japan) Naoya Senoo	(Japan) Nagano Parceiro	free	11 Dec 2018	
27	MF	(Japan) Yuto Mori	(Japan) Mito HollyHock	free	11 Dec 2018	
6	DF	(Japan) Ryo Hatsuse	(Japan) Vissel Kobe	unknown	17 Dec 2018	
24	MF	(Japan) Haruya Ide	(Japan) Montedio Yamagata	unknown	27 Dec 2018	
42	DF	(Japan) Bae Soo-yong	(Japan) Kamatamare Sanuki	loan	27 Dec 2018	
20	FW	(Japan) Shun Nagasawa	(Japan) Vegalta Sendai	unknown	29 Dec 2018	
30	FW	(Japan) So Hirao	(Japan) FC Machida Zelvia	unknown	29 Dec 2018	
39	MF	(Japan) Jin Izumisawa	(Poland) Pogoń Szczecin	free	5 Jan 2019	
31	GK	(Japan) Ryota Suzuki	(Japan) JEF United Chiba	loan	7 Jan 2019	
19	FW	(Japan) Kazunari Ichimi	(Japan) Kyoto Sanga FC	loan	7 Jan 2019	
N/A	MF	(Japan) Takahiro Futagawa	(Japan) FC TIAMO Hirakata	unknown	18 Jan 2019	
20	FW	(Japan) Hiroto Goya	(Japan) V-Varen Nagasaki	loan	22 Mar 2019	
17	MF	(Japan) Mizuki Ichimaru	(Japan) FC Gifu	loan	1 May 2019	
2	DF	(Japan) Hiroki Noda	(Japan) Montedio Yamagata	loan	30 May 2019	
22	DF	(South Korea) Oh Jae-suk	(Japan) FC Tokyo	loan	8 July 2019	
6	MF	(Japan) Tatsuya Tanaka	(Japan) Oita Trinita	unknown	10 July 2019	
16	FW	(South Korea) Hwang Ui-jo	(France) Bordeaux	unknown	14 July 2019	
25	MF	(Japan) Jungo Fujimoto	(Japan) Kyoto Sanga FC	loan	15 July 2019	
38	FW	(Japan) Keito Nakamura	(Netherlands) FC Twente	loan	16 July 2019	
15	MF	(Japan) Yasuyuki Konno	(Japan) Júbilo Iwata	unknown	17 July 2019	
18	FW	(Japan) Akito Takagi	(Japan) Montedio Yamagata	loan	25 July 2019	
14	DF	(Japan) Koki Yonekura	(Japan) JEF United Chiba	loan	29 July 2019	
40	FW	(Japan) Ryotaro Meshino	(England) Manchester City	unknown	9 August 2019	
28	MF	(Japan) Takahiro Ko	(Japan) Renofa Yamaguchi	loan	15 Aug 2019	

== Coaching staff ==
The Coaching Staff for the 2019 J1 League season;

Position	Staff
First-team Manager	(Japan) Tsuneyasu Miyamoto
Head Coach	(Japan) Satoshi Yamaguchi
Goalkeeper Coach	(Japan) Naoki Matsuyo
Coach	(Japan) Arata Kodama
Physical Coach	(Spain) Toni Gil Puerto

== First team squad ==
Appearances and goals as of the beginning of the 2019 season.

No.	Name	Nationality	Position(s)	Date of birth (age)	Height (cm)	Weight (kg)	Since	Previous club	Games played	Goals scored
Goalkeepers
1	Masaaki Higashiguchi	(Japan)	GK	12 May 1986 (age 39)	184	78	2014	Albirex Niigata	219	0
23	Mizuki Hayashi	(Japan)	GK	4 September 1996 (age 29)	182	74	2015	Gamba Osaka Youth	13	0
31	Ken Tajiri	(Japan)	GK	11 June 1993 (age 32)	182	76	2019	Zweigen Kanazawa*	1	0
41	Kosei Tani	(Japan)	GK	22 November 2000 (age 25)	187	78	2018	Gamba Osaka Youth	1	0
Defenders
4	Hiroki Fujiharu	(Japan)	LB	28 November 1988 (age 37)	175	60	2011	Osaka University of H&SS	312	12
5	Genta Miura (captain)	(Japan)	CB / RB	1 March 1995 (age 30)	183	77	2017	Shimizu S-Pulse	86	4
13	Shunya Suganuma	(Japan)	CB	17 May 1990 (age 35)	182	78	2018	Montedio Yamagata	17	0
19	Kim Young-gwon	(South Korea)	CB	27 February 1990 (age 35)	186	74	2019	(China) Guangzhou Evergrande	0	0
24	Keisuke Kurokawa	(Japan)	LB	13 April 1997 (age 28)	173	70	2019	Kansai University	0	0
27	Ryu Takao	(Japan)	RB / CB	9 November 1996 (age 29)	181	67	2019	Kwansei Gakuin University	0	0
30	Naoaki Aoyama	(Japan)	CB	18 July 1986 (age 39)	182	75	2019	(Thailand) Muangthong United	0	0
35	Tatsuya Yamaguchi	(Japan)	LB	9 February 2000 (age 25)	171	70	2018	Sagami Senior High School	0	0
36	Riku Matsuda	(Japan)	RB / CB	3 May 1999 (age 26)	175	60	2018	Maebashi Ikuei High School	0	0
Midfielders
7	Yasuhito Endō	(Japan)	CM / AM	28 January 1980 (age 46)	178	75	2001	Kyoto Purple Sanga	742	124
8	Kosuke Onose	(Japan)	RW / LW	22 April 1993 (age 32)	176	65	2018	Renofa Yamaguchi FC	16	3
10	Shu Kurata	(Japan)	RW / LW / CM	26 November 1988 (age 37)	172	68	2012	Cerezo Osaka*	332	50
11	David Concha	(Spain)	RW / CF	20 November 1996 (age 29)	178	70	2019	(Spain) Real Sociedad	0	0
14	Markel Susaeta	(Spain)	RW / LW	14 December 1987 (age 38)	179	68	2019	(Spain) Athletic Bilbao	0	0
15	Yosuke Ideguchi	(Japan)	CM	23 August 1996 (age 29)	171	69	2019	(England) Leeds United	95	9
17	Yuto Suzuki	(Japan)	RW / CF	7 December 1993 (age 32)	182	76	2019	Kawasaki Frontale	0	0
21	Shinya Yajima	(Japan)	DM / CM	18 January 1994 (age 32)	171	67	2019	Vegalta Sendai*	4	0
26	Kohei Okuno	(Japan)	CM	3 April 2000 (age 25)	174	63	2019	Gamba Osaka Youth	0	0
28	Yuki Yamamoto	(Japan)	AM	6 November 1997 (age 28)	173	64	2019	Kwansei Gakuin University	0	0
29	Leo Takae	(Japan)	CM	27 June 1998 (age 27)	171	60	2017	Higashi Fukuoka High School	16	0
32	Ren Shibamoto	(Japan)	CM / DM	22 July 1999 (age 26)	172	59	2018	Gamba Osaka Youth	0	0
34	Yuya Fukuda	(Japan)	RM / LM	4 April 1999 (age 26)	176	70	2018	Higashi Fukuoka High School	5	0
Strikers
9	Ademilson	(Brazil)	AM / CF	9 January 1994 (age 32)	176	74	2016	(Brazil) São Paulo	93	24
18	Patric	(Brazil)	CF	26 October 1987 (age 38)	189	82	2019	Sanfrecce Hiroshima	111	38
20	Daisuke Takagi	(Japan)	RW / LW / CF	14 October 1995 (age 30)	170	64	2019	(Japan) Renofa Yamaguchi	0	0
33	Takashi Usami	(Japan)	LW / CF	6 May 1992 (age 33)	178	69	2019	(Germany) Augsburg	195	92
37	Haruto Shirai	(Japan)	CF / RW	23 October 1999 (age 26)	170	60	2018	Gamba Osaka Youth	0	0
39	Kazuma Watanabe	(Japan)	CF	10 August 1986 (age 39)	182	79	2018	Vissel Kobe	12	3

* indicates player returned to Gamba Osaka from a loan spell with this club.

== J1 League ==
On 11 January, Gamba's first 2 fixtures for the season were announced, at home to Yokohama F. Marinos and away to Shimizu S-Pulse. The dates for the remaining games were revealed on 23 January.

Round	Date	Time*	Opponents	H / A	Result F–A	Scorers	Attendance	League position
1	22 February 2019	15:00	Yokohama F. Marinos	H	2-3	Onose 1', Fujiharu 88'	27,064	14th
2	2 March 2019	14:00	Shimizu S-Pulse	A	4-2	Onose 28', Ademilson 58', 70', Hwang 73'	15,820	5th
3	9 March 2019	15:00	Nagoya Grampus	H	2-3	Nakatani (og) 36', Ademilson (pen.) 67'	26,865	11th
4	17 March 2019	15:00	Kawasaki Frontale	A	1-0	Miura 90+1'	23,982	9th
5	30 March 2019	17:00	Vissel Kobe	H	3-4	Ademilson 10', Hwang 24', Kurata 72'	37,076	11th
6	6 April 2019	14:00	Sanfrecce Hiroshima	A	0-3		13,331	15th
7	14 April 2019	16:00	Urawa Red Diamonds	H	0-1		27,870	15th
8	20 April 2019	16:00	Oita Trinita	H	1-1	Endō 71'	17,727	15th
9	28 April 2019	13:00	Vegalta Sendai	A	1-2	Kim 32'	16,004	15th
10	4 May 2019	16:00	FC Tokyo	H	0-0		33,905	15th
11	11 May 2019	14:00	Sagan Tosu	A	1-3	Meshino 90+2'	14,789	16th
12	18 May 2019	19:00	Cerezo Osaka	H	1-0	Kurata 55'	35,861	14th
13	25 May 2019	14:00	Hokkaido Consadole Sapporo	A	0-0		15,690	16th
14	1 June 2019	19:00	Kashima Antlers	H	1-1	Meshino 13'	30,495	15th
15	15 June 2019	19:00	Júbilo Iwata	A	0-0		12,352	17th
16	22 June 2019	19:00	Shonan Bellmare	H	1-0	Meshino 90+1'	19,162	14th
17	29 June 2019	18:00	Matsumoto Yamaga	A	3-1	Hwang 26', 82', Kurata 63'	15,690	13th
18	7 July 2019	19:00	FC Tokyo	A	1-3	Onose 5'	28,209	14th
19	13 July 2019	19:00	Shimizu S-Pulse	H	1-0	Yajima 88'	25,719	11th=
20	20 July 2019	18:00	Nagoya Grampus	A	2-2	Ademilson 8', Usami 90+1'	42,975	11th
21	2 August 2019	19:00	Vissel Kobe	A	2-2	Kurata 8', Patric 53'	21,276	13th
22	10 August 2019	19:00	Sanfrecce Hiroshima	H	1-1	Kurata 89'	30,476	13th
23	18 August 2019	19:00	Júbilo Iwata	H	1-1	Onose 44'	37,334	13th
24	24 August 2019	18:30	Kashima Antlers	A	2-2	Ademilson 33', Patric (pen.) 73'	16,063	14th
25	31 August 2019	19:00	Yokohama F. Marinos	A	1-3	Onose 67'	13,590	14th
26	14 September 2019	19:00	Sagan Tosu	H	1-0	Watanabe 84'	23,287	12th
27	28 September 2019	14:00	Cerezo Osaka	A	1-3	Kim o.g. 90+2'	36,990	14th
28	4 October 2019	19:00	Hokkaido Consadole Sapporo	H	5-0	Kurata 57', Usami 61', Ademilson 70', Fujiharu 88', Watanabe 90+3'	20,554	12th
29	19 October 2019	14:00	Kawasaki Frontale	H	2-2	Watanabe 5', Kurata 65'	25,748	9th
30	3 Nov 2019	16:00	Shonan Bellmare	A	3-0	Onose 10', Usami 45+1', 50'	13,570	9th
31	10 Nov 2019	14:00	Oita Trinita	A	1-2	Usami 11'	17,022	9th
32	23 Nov 2019	15:00	Vegalta Sendai	H	2-0	Usami 69', Ademilson 77'	26,256	9th
33	30 Nov 2019	14:00	Matsumoto Yamaga	H	4-1	Onose 11', Ideguchi 30', 45', Ademilson 58'	25,635	9th
34	7 Dec 2019	14:00	Urawa Red Diamonds	A	3-2	Usami 9', Ademilson 64', Fukuda 87'	47,188	7th

* = all times Japan Standard Time.

=== Match Day Line-Ups ===
The following players appeared for Gamba Osaka during the 2019 J1 League:

Player Appearances – 2019 J1 League
Round	Opponent	GK	RB	LB	CB	CB	CM	CM	RW	LW	CF	CF	Substituted on	Substituted on	Substituted on
1	Yokohama F. Marinos	Higashiguchi	Oh	Fujiharu	Miura	Kim	Endō (substituted off)	Ko (substituted off)	Onose (substituted off)	Kurata	Ademilson	Hwang	Tanaka	Yajima	Watanabe
2	Shimizu S-Pulse	Higashiguchi	Oh	Fujiharu	Miura	Kim	Endō (substituted off)	Konno	Onose (substituted off)	Kurata	Ademilson (substituted off)	Hwang	Yajima	Fujimoto	Watanabe
3	Nagoya Grampus	Higashiguchi	Oh (substituted off)	Fujiharu	Miura	Kim	Endō (substituted off)	Konno	Onose	Kurata (substituted off)	Ademilson	Hwang	Yonekura	Yajima	Watanabe
Round	Opponent	GK	RB	LB	CB	CB	DM	DM	AM	RW	LW	CF	Substituted on	Substituted on	Substituted on
4	Kawasaki Frontale	Higashiguchi	Miura	Fujiharu	Suganuma	Kim	Ko	Kurata	Endō	Onose (substituted off)	Ademilson (substituted off)	Hwang	Yonekura	Watanabe	
5	Vissel Kobe	Higashiguchi	Miura	Fujiharu	Suganuma (substituted off)	Kim	Ko	Kurata	Endō (substituted off)	Onose (substituted off)	Ademilson	Hwang	Tanaka	Yonekura	Watanabe
6	Sanfrecce Hiroshima	Higashiguchi	Miura (substituted off)	Fujiharu	Suganuma	Kim	Ko (substituted off)	Kurata	Endō	Onose (substituted off)	Ademilson	Hwang	Yonekura	Yajima	Watanabe
Round	Opponent	GK	RB	LB	CB	CB	CM	CM	RW	LW	CF	CF	Substituted on	Substituted on	Substituted on
7	Urawa Red Diamonds	Higashiguchi	Oh	Fujiharu (substituted off)	Miura	Kim	Endō	Konno (substituted off)	Onose	Kurata (substituted off)	Ademilson	Hwang	Yonekura	Takae	Nakamura
Round	Opponent	GK	CB	CB	CB	RWB	LWB	CM	CM	RW	LW	CF	Substituted on	Substituted on	Substituted on
8	Oita Trinita	Higashiguchi	Suganuma	Kim	Miura	Tanaka (substituted off)	Oh	Endō	Konno	Fujimoto (substituted off)	Kurata	Watanabe (substituted off)	Onose	Ademilson	Hwang
Round	Opponent	GK	RB	LB	CB	CB	DM	DM	RW	LW	AM	CF	Substituted on	Substituted on	Substituted on
9	Vegalta Sendai	Higashiguchi	Yonekura	Oh	Miura	Kim	Konno	Yajima	Onose (substituted off)	Kurata (substituted off)	Ademilson (substituted off)	Hwang	Tanaka	Endō	Meshino
10	FC Tokyo	Higashiguchi	Yonekura	Oh	Suganuma	Kim	Ko (substituted off)	Kurata	Onose	Ademilson	Endō	Hwang	Konno		
11	Sagan Tosu	Higashiguchi	Yonekura	Oh	Suganuma	Kim	Konno	Kurata	Onose	Ademilson	Endō	Hwang	Yajima	Kurokawa	Meshino
Round	Opponent	GK	CB	CB	CB	RWB	LWB	DM	CM	CM	CF	CF	Substituted on	Substituted on	Substituted on
12	Cerezo Osaka	Higashiguchi	Takao	Miura	Suganuma	Onose	Fukuda	Yajima (substituted off)	Takae (substituted off)	Kurata (substituted off)	Hwang	Ademilson	Endō	Konno	Meshino
13	Hokkaido Consadole Sapporo	Higashiguchi	Takao	Miura	Suganuma	Onose (substituted off)	Fukuda	Yajima	Takae (substituted off)	Kurata	Hwang	Ademilson (substituted off)	Tanaka	Konno	Meshino
14	Kashima Antlers	Higashiguchi	Takao	Miura	Kim	Onose (substituted off)	Fukuda	Yajima	Takae (substituted off)	Kurata	Meshino	Ademilson (substituted off)	Tanaka	Konno	Hwang
15	Júbilo Iwata	Higashiguchi	Takao	Miura	Kim	Fukuda	Nakamura	Yajima	Takae (substituted off)	Kurata	Hwang	Meshino (substituted off)	Endō	Ademilson	
16	Shonan Bellmare	Higashiguchi	Takao	Miura	Kim	Tanaka	Nakamura	Yajima	Takae (substituted off)	Fukuda (substituted off)	Hwang	Ademilson (substituted off)	Endō	Watanabe	Meshino
17	Matsumoto Yamaga	Higashiguchi	Takao	Miura	Kim	Tanaka	Nakamura (substituted off)	Endō (substituted off)	Kurata	Yajima	Hwang	Meshino (substituted off)	Fujiharu	Ademilson	Takae
18	FC Tokyo	Higashiguchi	Takao	Miura	Kim	Onose (substituted off)	Nakamura	Yajima (substituted off)	Takae (substituted off)	Kurata	Hwang	Ademilson	Endō	Fukuda	Meshino
19	Shimizu S-Pulse	Higashiguchi	Takao	Miura	Kim	Fukuda	Nakamura	Yajima (substituted off)	Onose (substituted off)	Kurata	Hwang	Meshino (substituted off)	Endō	Ademilson	Ko
20	Nagoya Grampus	Higashiguchi	Takao	Suganuma	Kim	Fukuda	Nakamura (substituted off)	Yajima	Endō (substituted off)	Kurata	Ademilson (substituted off)	Usami	Onose	Watanabe	Meshino
21	Vissel Kobe	Higashiguchi	Takao	Miura	Kim	Onose (substituted off)	Fukuda	Yajima	Kurata	Usami (substituted off)	Patric (substituted off)	Ademilson	Endō	Suzuki	Meshino
22	Sanfrecce Hiroshima	Higashiguchi	Takao	Miura	Kim	Onose	Fukuda (substituted off)	Yajima	Takae (substituted off)	Kurata	Ademilson (substituted off)	Usami	Ideguchi	Suzuki	Watanabe
23	Júbilo Iwata	Higashiguchi	Takao	Miura	Kim	Onose (substituted off)	Suzuki	Endō	Takae (substituted off)	Kurata	Patric	Usami (substituted off)	Suganuma	Ideguchi	Yajima
24	Kashima Antlers	Higashiguchi	Takao	Miura	Kim	Onose	Fukuda (substituted off)	Ideguchi	Kurata (substituted off)	Usami (substituted off)	Patric	Ademilson	D. Takagi	Yajima	Watanabe
25	Yokohama F. Marinos	Higashiguchi	Takao	Miura	Kim	Onose	Fukuda	Ideguchi	Yajima (substituted off)	Kurata (substituted off)	Ademilson	Usami (substituted off)	Endō	Patric	Watanabe
Round	Opponent	GK	RB	LB	CB	CB	CM	CM	RW	LW	CF	CF	Substituted on	Substituted on	Substituted on
26	Sagan Tosu	Higashiguchi	Takao	Fujiharu	Miura	Kim	Ideguchi	Endō	Onose (substituted off)	Kurata (substituted off)	Patric (substituted off)	Usami	Ademilson	Susaeta	Watanabe
27	Cerezo Osaka	Higashiguchi	Takao	Fujiharu (substituted off)	Miura	Kim	Ideguchi	Endō	Susaeta	Kurata (substituted off)	Usami	Watanabe (substituted off)	Ademilson	Concha	Patric
Round	Opponent	GK	CB	CB	CB	RWB	LWB	CM	CM	AM	AM	CF	Substituted on	Substituted on	Substituted on
28	Hokkaido Consadole Sapporo	Higashiguchi	Takao	Miura	Kim	Onose	Fukuda (substituted off)	Yajima	Ideguchi	Usami	Kurata	Ademilson	Fujiharu	Patric	Watanabe
29	Kawasaki Frontale	Higashiguchi	Takao	Miura	Kim	Fukuda	Fujiharu (substituted off)	Yajima	Ideguchi	Onose	Kurata (substituted off)	Watanabe (substituted off)	Susaeta	Patric	Takae
Round	Opponent	GK	CB	CB	CB	RWB	LWB	DM	CM	CM	CF	CF	Substituted on	Substituted on	Substituted on
30	Shonan Bellmare	Higashiguchi	Suganuma	Miura	Kim	Onose	Fujiharu	Endō (substituted off)	Ideguchi	Yajima	Ademilson (substituted off)	Usami (substituted off)	Concha	Patric	Watanabe
31	Oita Trinita	Higashiguchi	Suganuma (substituted off)	Miura	Kim	Onose	Fujiharu	Endō	Ideguchi (substituted off)	Yajima (substituted off)	Ademilson	Usami	Susaeta	Patric	Fukuda
32	Vegalta Sendai	Higashiguchi	Suganuma	Miura	Kim	Onose	Fujiharu	Endō (substituted off)	Ideguchi	Yajima (substituted off)	Ademilson	Usami (substituted off)	Kurata	Susaeta	Patric
33	Matsumoto Yamaga	Higashiguchi	Suganuma	Miura	Kim	Onose (substituted off)	Fujiharu	Endō	Ideguchi (substituted off)	Yajima	Ademilson (substituted off)	Usami	Kurata	Fukuda	Watanabe
34	Urawa Reds	Higashiguchi	Suganuma	Miura	Kim	Onose	Fujiharu	Endō	Kurata (substituted off)	Yajima	Ademilson (substituted off)	Usami (substituted off)	Patric	Takagi	Fukuda

(substituted on) = Substitute on, (substituted off) = Substitute Off, = Number of goals scored, = Yellow Card and = Red Card.

== Emperor's Cup ==
Gamba entered the 2019 Emperor's Cup at the 2nd round stage where they were drawn at home to J3 League side Kamatamare Sanuki on 3 July. A 7-1 thrashing of the Kagawa-based outfit set up a 3rd round tie with Hosei University who saw off J2 side Tokyo Verdy in the previous round. For the second year in a row Gamba were defeated by university opposition as the students recorded a 2–0 win in Tokyo.

Round	Date	Time*	Opponents	H / A	Result F-A	Scorers	Attendance
2nd round	3 July 2019	19:00	Kamatamare Sanuki	H	7-1	Nakamura 10', 14', 79', Meshino 24', Takagi 75', 82, Ademilson 90+3'	3,543
3rd round	14 August 2019	18:30	Hosei University	H	0-2		4,905

=== Match Day Line-Ups ===
Player Appearances – 2019 Emperor's Cup
Round	Opponent	GK	CB	CB	CB	RWB	LWB	DM	CM	CM	CF	CF	Substituted on	Substituted on	Substituted on
R2	Kamatamare Sanuki	Higashiguchi	Takao	Aoyama	Suganuma	Onose (substituted off)	Fukuda	Yajima	Takae	Concha (substituted off)	Nakamura	Meshino (substituted off)	Tanaka	Ademilson	Takagi
R3	Hosei University	Higashiguchi	Miura	Suganuma	Kim	Onose	Fukuda (substituted off)	Endō (substituted off)	Ideguchi (substituted off)	Yajima	Suzuki	Watanabe	Ademilson	Kurata	Usami

(substituted on) = Substitute on, (substituted off) = Substitute Off, = Number of goals scored, = Yellow Card and = Red Card.

== J.League Cup ==
On 23 January, Gamba's fixtures for the group stage of the 2019 J.League Cup were announced. Gamba were drawn alongside fellow J1 clubs; Jubilo Iwata, Matsumoto Yamaga and Shimuzu S-Pulse and after accumulating 11 points from 6 games they topped their group and reached the playoff round where they were paired with J2 League side V-Varen Nagasaki. A 4–1 victory in the first leg away from home ended the tie as a contest and although Nagasaki snatched a 2–0 win at the Panasonic Stadium it wasn't enough and Gamba progressed to the quarter-finals where they were paired with FC Tokyo. A 1–0 home win preceded a 2-1 reverse in the second leg and meant Gamba headed to the semi-finals on the away goals rule. In the last 4 they were drawn against Hokkaido Consadole Sapporo. Gamba followed up a 5–0 win in the league 5 days previously with a 2–1 home leg victory, however this time they were the ones eliminated by the away goals rule as Musashi Suzuki's thunderbolt in the second leg in Sapporo sent Consadole through to their first ever final against Kawasaki Frontale.

Round	Date	Time*	Opponents	H / A	Result F–A	Scorers	Attendance
1	6 March 2019	19:00	Júbilo Iwata	A	0-1		7,100
2	13 March 2019	19:00	Matsumoto Yamaga	H	2-1	Onose 31', Hwang 34'	7,430
3	10 April 2019	19:00	Shimizu S-Pulse	A	1-1	Miura 5'	4,158
4	24 April 2019	19:00	Júbilo Iwata	H	4-1	Hwang 10', Tanaka 12', Meshino 79', Nakamura 90+2'	7,006
5	8 May 2019	19:00	Shimizu S-Pulse	H	3-1	Miura 45', Hwang 65', Nakamura 67'	7,051
6	22 May 2019	19:00	Matsumoto Yamaga	A	0-0		7,680
Playoff	19 June 2019	19:00	V-Varen Nagasaki	A	4-1	Tanaka 31', Kurata 54', Ademilson 58', Nakamura 82'	6,480
Playoff	26 June 2019	19:00	V-Varen Nagasaki	H	0-2		5,708
Quarter-final	4 September 2019	19:00	FC Tokyo	H	1-0	Kurata 39'	7,045
Quarter-final	8 September 2019	18:00	FC Tokyo	A	1-2	Patric 76'	8,177
Semi-final	9 October 2019	19:00	Hokkaido Consadole Sapporo	H	2-1	Usami (pen) 74', Kurata 90+5'	8,138
Semi-final	13 October 2019	13:00	Hokkaido Consadole Sapporo	A	0-1		15,996

* = all times Japan Standard Time.

=== Match Day Line-Ups ===
Player Appearances – 2019 J.League Cup
Round	Opponent	GK	RB	LB	CB	CB	CM	CM	RM	LM	CF	CF	Substituted on	Substituted on	Substituted on
1	Júbilo Iwata	Higashiguchi	Yonekura	Tanaka (substituted off)	Suganuma	Miura	Ko	Yajima	Fujimoto	Onose (substituted off)	Watanabe	Goya (substituted off)	Fujiharu	Ademilson	Nakamura
Round	Opponent	GK	RB	LB	CB	CB	DM	DM	AM	RW	LW	CF	Substituted on	Substituted on	Substituted on
2	Matsumoto Yamaga	Higashiguchi	Miura	Fujiharu	Suganuma	Kim	Ko	Kurata	Endō (substituted off)	Onose (substituted off)	Ademilson	Hwang (substituted off)	Konno	Fujimoto	Watanabe
Round	Opponent	GK	RB	LB	CB	CB	CM	CM	RM	LM	CF	CF	Substituted on	Substituted on	Substituted on
3	Shimizu S-Pulse	Hayashi	Oh	Fujiharu	Miura	Kim	Takae	Konno	Fujimoto (substituted off)	Kurata	Watanabe (substituted off)	Ademilson (substituted off)	Tanaka	Yonekura	Nakamura
4	Júbilo Iwata	Hayashi	Yonekura	Kurokawa	Suganuma	Aoyama	Ko	Yajima	Onose (substituted off)	Tanaka (substituted off)	Hwang (substituted off)	Meshino	Takae	Fukuda	Nakamura
5	Shimizu S-Pulse	Tajiri	Takao	Kurokawa	Miura	Aoyama	Ko	Yajima	Fujimoto (substituted off)	Tanaka (substituted off)	Ademilson (substituted off)	Meshino	Hwang	Fukuda	Nakamura
Round	Opponent	GK	RB	LB	CB	CB	DM	DM	AM	RW	LW	CF	Substituted on	Substituted on	Substituted on
6	Matsumoto Yamaga	Hayashi	Yonekura	Oh	Aoyama	Kim	Konno	Ko (substituted off)	Endō	Meshino	Tanaka	Takagi (substituted off)	Concha	Shibamoto	
Round	Opponent	GK	CB	CB	CB	RWB	LWB	DM	CM	CM	CF	CF	Substituted on	Substituted on	Substituted on
PO	V-Varen Nagasaki	Hayashi	Suganuma	Aoyama (substituted off)	Oh	Yonekura	Tanaka	Endō	Konno (substituted off)	Kurata	Watanabe	Ademilson (substituted off)	Miura	Fujimoto	Nakamura
PO	V-Varen Nagasaki	Hayashi	Suganuma	Aoyama	Oh	Yonekura	Concha	Ko	Konno (substituted off)	Kurata (substituted off)	Watanabe	Ademilson (substituted off)	Fujiharu	Fujimoto	Meshino
Round	Opponent	GK	CB	CB	CB	RWB	LWB	CM	CM	AM	AM	CF	Substituted on	Substituted on	Substituted on
QF	FC Tokyo	Higashiguchi	Takao	Miura	Suganuma	Onose (substituted off)	Suzuki	Ideguchi	Endō	Takae	Kurata (substituted off)	Patric (substituted off)	Yajima	Usami	Watanabe
QF	FC Tokyo	Higashiguchi	Takao	Miura	Suganuma (substituted off)	Onose	Suzuki	Ideguchi	Endō	Takae (substituted off)	Kurata (substituted off)	Patric	Ademilson	Aoyama	Usami
Round	Opponent	GK	CB	CB	CB	RWB	LWB	DM	CM	CM	CF	CF	Substituted on	Substituted on	Substituted on
SF	Hokkaido Consadole Sapporo	Higashiguchi	Takao	Miura	Suganuma	Onose	Fukuda (substituted off)	Yajima	Ideguchi	Kurata	Ademilson (substituted off)	Usami (substituted off)	Fujiharu	Susaeta	Patric
SF	Hokkaido Consadole Sapporo	Higashiguchi	Takao	Miura	Suganuma	Onose	Fukuda	Yajima (substituted off)	Ideguchi	Kurata	Ademilson (substituted off)	Usami (substituted off)	Susaeta	Patric	Watanabe

(substituted on) = Substitute on, (substituted off) = Substitute Off, = Number of goals scored, = Yellow Card and = Red Card.

== Squad statistics ==
No.	Pos.	Name	J1 League		Emperor's Cup		J.League Cup		Total		Discipline		
No.	Pos.	Name	Apps	Goals	Apps	Goals	Apps	Goals	Apps	Goals	Yellow card	Yellow card Red card	Red card
1	GK	(Japan) Masaaki Higashiguchi	34	0	2	0	6	0	42	0	1	0	0
4	DF	(Japan) Hiroki Fujiharu	15(2)	2	0	0	2(3)	0	17(5)	2	0	0	0
5	DF	(Japan) Genta Miura (c)	31	1	1	0	8(1)	2	40(1)	3	2	0	0
7	MF	(Japan) Yasuhito Endō	20(8)	1	1	0	5	0	26(8)	1	0	0	0
8	MF	(Japan) Kosuke Onose	28(2)	7	2	0	7	1	37(2)	8	5	0	0
9	FW	(Brazil) Ademilson	26(6)	10	0(2)	1	7(2)	1	33(10)	12	4	0	0
10	MF	(Japan) Shu Kurata	29(2)	7	0(1)	0	8	3	37(3)	10	7	0	1
11	MF	(Spain) David Concha	0(2)	0	1	0	1(1)	0	2(3)	0	0	0	0
13	DF	(Japan) Shunya Suganuma	14(1)	0	2	0	9	0	25(1)	0	3	0	0
14	MF	(Spain) Markel Susaeta	1(4)	0	0	0	0(2)	0	1(6)	0	0	0	0
15	MF	(Japan) Yosuke Ideguchi	10(2)	2	1	0	4	0	15(2)	2	0	0	0
17	MF	(Japan) Yuto Suzuki	1(2)	0	1	0	2	0	4(2)	0	2	0	0
18	FW	(Brazil) Patric	4(8)	2	0	0	2(2)	1	6(10)	3	1	0	0
19	DF	(South Korea) Kim Young-gwon	32	1	1	0	3	0	36	1	7	0	0
20	FW	(Japan) Daisuke Takagi	0(2)	0	0	0	0	0	0(2)	0	0	0	0
21	MF	(Japan) Shinya Yajima	20(7)	1	2	0	5(1)	0	27(8)	1	1	0	0
23	GK	(Japan) Mizuki Hayashi	0	0	0	0	5	0	5	0	2	0	0
24	GK	(Japan) Keisuke Kurokawa	0(1)	0	0	0	2	0	2(1)	0	0	0	0
26	MF	(Japan) Kohei Okuno	0	0	0	0	0	0	0	0	0	0	0
27	DF	(Japan) Ryu Takao	18	0	1	0	5	0	24	0	3	0	0
28	MF	(Japan) Yuki Yamamoto	0	0	0	0	0	0	0	0	0	0	0
29	MF	(Japan) Leo Takae	8(3)	0	1	0	3(1)	0	12(4)	0	2	0	0
30	DF	(Japan) Naoaki Aoyama	0	0	1	0	5(1)	0	6(1)	0	1	0	0
31	GK	(Japan) Ken Tajiri	0	0	0	0	1	0	1	0	0	0	0
32	MF	(Japan) Ren Shibamoto	0	0	0	0	0(1)	0	0(1)	0	1	0	0
33	FW	(Japan) Takashi Usami	14	7	0(1)	0	2(2)	1	16(3)	8	0	0	0
34	MF	(Japan) Yuya Fukuda	13(4)	1	2	0	2(2)	0	17(6)	1	2	0	0
35	DF	(Japan) Tatsuya Yamaguchi	0	0	0	0	0	0	0	0	0	0	0
36	DF	(Japan) Riku Matsuda	0	0	0	0	0	0	0	0	0	0	0
37	FW	(Japan) Haruto Shirai	0	0	0	0	0	0	0	0	0	0	0
39	FW	(Japan) Kazuma Watanabe	3(15)	3	1	0	4(3)	0	7(18)	3	0	0	0
41	GK	(Japan) Kosei Tani	0	0	0	0	0	0	0	0	0	0	0
—	—	Own goals	–	1	–	0	–	0	–	1	–	–	–
Mid-season Departures
2	DF	(Japan) Hiroki Noda	0	0	0	0	0	0	0	0	0	0	0
6	MF	(Japan) Tatsuya Tanaka	3(5)	0	0(1)	0	5(1)	2	8(7)	2	0	0	0
14	DF	(Japan) Koki Yonekura	3(5)	0	0	0	5(1)	0	8(6)	0	0	0	0
15	MF	(Japan) Yasuyuki Konno	6(4)	0	0	0	4(1)	0	10(5)	0	1	0	0
16	FW	(South Korea) Hwang Ui-jo	17(2)	4	0	0	2(1)	3	19(3)	7	1	0	0
17	MF	(Japan) Mizuki Ichimaru	0	0	0	0	0	0	0	0	0	0	0
18	FW	(Japan) Akito Takagi	0	0	0(1)	2	1	0	1(1)	2	0	0	0
20	FW	(Japan) Hiroto Goya	0	0	0	0	1	0	1	0	0	0	0
22	DF	(South Korea) Oh Jae-suk	8	0	0	0	4	0	12	0	3	0	0
25	MF	(Japan) Jungo Fujimoto	1(1)	0	0	0	3(3)	0	4(4)	0	0	0	0
28	MF	(Japan) Takahiro Ko	5(1)	0	0	0	6	0	11(1)	0	3	0	0
38	FW	(Japan) Keito Nakamura	6(1)	0	1	3	0(5)	3	7(6)	6	0	0	0
40	FW	(Japan) Ryotaro Meshino	4(8)	3	1	1	3(1)	1	8(9)	5	0	0	0

Statistics accurate as of match played 7 December 2019

=== Goalscorers ===
As of 7 December 2019

Rank	Position	Name	J1 League	Emperor's Cup	J.League Cup	Total
1	FW	(Brazil) Ademilson	10	1	1	12
2	MF	(Japan) Shu Kurata	7	0	3	10
3	MF	(Japan) Kosuke Onose	7	0	1	8
3	FW	(Japan) Takashi Usami	7	0	1	8
5	FW	(South Korea) Hwang Ui-jo	4	0	3	7
6	FW	(Japan) Keito Nakamura	0	3	3	6
7	FW	(Japan) Ryotaro Meshino	3	1	1	5
8	DF	(Japan) Genta Miura	1	0	2	3
8	FW	(Brazil) Patric	2	0	1	3
8	FW	(Japan) Kazuma Watanabe	3	0	0	3
11	DF	(Japan) Hiroki Fujiharu	2	0	0	2
11	MF	(Japan) Yosuke Ideguchi	2	0	0	2
11	FW	(Japan) Akito Takagi	0	2	0	2
11	MF	(Japan) Tatsuya Tanaka	0	0	2	2
15	MF	(Japan) Yasuhito Endō	1	0	0	1
15	MF	(Japan) Yuya Fukuda	1	0	0	1
15	DF	(South Korea) Kim Young-gwon	1	0	0	1
15	MF	(Japan) Shinya Yajima	1	0	0	1
15	N/A	Own goal	1	0	0	1
Total			54	7	18	79

=== Assists ===
As of 7 December 2019

Rank	Position	Name	J1 League	Emperor's Cup	J.League Cup	Total
1	FW	(Brazil) Ademilson	8	1	2	11
2	MF	(Japan) Kosuke Onose	4	0	2	6
3	MF	(Japan) Yasuhito Endō	5	0	0	5
3	MF	(Japan) Shinya Yajima	4	0	1	5
5	FW	(Japan) Keito Nakamura	1	2	1	4
6	DF	(Japan) Hiroki Fujiharu	3	0	0	3
6	FW	(South Korea) Hwang Ui-jo	1	0	2	3
8	MF	(Japan) Jungo Fujimoto	0	0	2	2
8	DF	(Japan) Genta Miura	2	0	0	2
8	MF	(Japan) Leo Takae	1	0	1	2
8	FW	(Japan) Takashi Usami	1	0	1	2
8	DF	(Japan) Koki Yonekura	0	0	2	2
13	MF	(Spain) David Concha	0	1	0	1
13	MF	(Japan) Yuya Fukuda	0	1	0	1
13	GK	(Japan) Masaaki Higashiguchi	1	0	0	1
13	DF	(South Korea) Kim Young-gwon	1	0	0	1
13	MF	(Japan) Takahiro Ko	0	0	1	1
13	MF	(Japan) Shu Kurata	1	0	0	1
13	DF	(Japan) Keisuke Kurokawa	0	0	1	1
13	FW	(Japan) Ryotaro Meshino	1	0	0	1
13	DF	(South Korea) Oh Jae-suk	1	0	0	1
13	FW	(Brazil) Patric	1	0	0	1
13	DF	(Japan) Shunya Suganuma	1	0	0	1
13	FW	(Japan) Akito Takagi	0	1	0	1
13	MF	(Japan) Tatsuya Tanaka	1	0	0	1
Total			38	6	16	60

== Gamba Osaka Under-23 ==
Gamba Osaka's Under-23 side compete in the J3 League where they are allowed to name 3 overage players of which one must be a goalkeeper. On January 11, their opening home and away fixtures for the 2019 J3 League season were announced against Vanraure Hachinohe and Azul Claro Numazu. The schedule for the remaining games was announced on January 23.

Round	Date	Time*	Opponents	H / A	Result F–A	Scorers	Attendance	League position
1	10 March 2019	14:00	Vanraure Hachinohe	H	2-2	Takagi 54', R. Meshino (pen.) 90'	1,094	6th=
2	17 March 2019	13:00	Azul Claro Numazu	A	0-0		2,567	10th
3	24 March 2019	14:00	Giravanz Kitakyushu	H	0-1		1,270	14th
4	31 March 2019	13:00	YSCC Yokohama	A	5-0	R. Meshino 2', 72', Nakamura 13', Fukuda 66', S. Meshino 90'	1,393	8th
5	7 April 2019	14:00	FC Tokyo U-23	H	2-1	R. Meshino 74', 85'	1,218	6th
6	13 April 2019	14:00	Roasso Kumamoto	H	1-2	R. Meshino 33'	958	7th
7	26 April 2019	19:00	Thespakusatsu Gunma	A	0-0		1,875	8th
8	5 May 2019	14:00	Blaublitz Akita	H	3-1	R. Meshino 31', 50', Takagi 89'	1,732	7th
9	18 May 2019	14:00	Kataller Toyama	A	1-3	Takagi 46'	2,027	8th
10	2 June 2019	14:00	Fujieda MYFC	H	3-1	Takagi 77', 90+6', Okuda 90+5'	1,038	7th
11	9 June 2019	14:00	Kamatamare Sanuki	H	2-2	Takagi 40', Shibamoto 84'	2,662	7th
12	15 June 2019	17:00	SC Sagamihara	A	0-1		1,609	9th
13	23 June 2019	17:00	Gainare Tottori	H	3-1	Tsukamoto 8', 59', 90'	1,050	8th
14	30 June 2019	17:00	Nagano Parceiro	A	2-1	Own goal 20', Takagi 77'	3,573	5th
15	7 July 2019	17:00	Iwate Grulla Morioka	H	1-2	Takagi 87'	700	7th
16	14 July 2019	15:00	Fukushima United	A	1-2	Shibamoto 33'	1,255	8th
17	21 July 2019	18:00	Cerezo Osaka U-23	A	4-1	Takagi 23', 47', 84', Matsuda 64'	4,755	8th
18	28 July 2019	18:00	AC Nagano Parceiro	H	1-2	Toyama 89'	1,747	8th
19	4 August 2019	13:00	Vanraure Hachinohe	A	2-2	Toyama 31', 59'	2,050	7th
20	10 August 2019	18:00	Giravanz Kitakyushu	A	1-2	Tsukamoto 9'	5,138	8th
21	1 September 2019	19:00	Fukushima United	H	6-0	Toyama 11', 52', 76', J. Nakamura 50', 63', Shirai 86'	961	7th
22	7 September 2019	19:00	Roasso Kumamoto	A	0-1		16,027	9th
23	15 Sept 2019	18:00	YSCC Yokohama	H	0-1		1,022	11th
24	28 Sept 2019	13:00	Fujieda MYFC	A	1-2	Shirai 3'	1,304	13th
25	6 October 2019	14:00	Kataller Toyama	H	2-3	Shirai 21', Toyama 67'	893	13th
26	13 October 2019	13:00	Gainare Tottori	A	2-2	Own goal 29', Concha 83'	1,850	12th
27	20 October 2019	13:00	Kamatamare Sanuki	A	1-1	Shibamoto 65'	1,786	13th
28	27 October 2019	14:00	Cerezo Osaka U-23	H	1-2	J. Nakamura 50'	2,231	14th
29	4 November 2019	14:00	SC Sagamihara	H	3-2	Shirai 12', Okuno 45+2', Kawasaki 85'	876	11th
30	9 November 2019	13:00	Iwate Grulla Morioka	A	3-3	Kawasaki 33', Murakami 58', Tsukamoto 88'	1,139	12th
31	17 Nov 2019	13:00	Blaublitz Akita	A	0-3		1,356	12th
32	24 Nov 2019	15:00	Thespakusatsu Gunma	H	0-1		866	14th
33	1 Dec 2019	14:00	Azul Claro Numazu	H	0-2		1,154	16th
34	8 Dec 2019	13:00	FC Tokyo U-23	A	1-5	Toyama 48'	2,072	17th

* = all times Japan Standard Time.

== U-23 Squad statistics ==
No.	Pos.	Name	J3 League		Discipline		
No.	Pos.	Name	Apps	Goals	Yellow card	Yellow card Red card	Red card
4	DF	(Japan) Hiroki Fujiharu	2	0	0	0	0
11	MF	(Spain) David Concha	4	1	1	0	0
17	MF	(Japan) Yuto Suzuki	1	0	0	0	0
20	FW	(Japan) Daisuke Takagi	1	0	0	0	0
23	GK	(Japan) Mizuki Hayashi	5	0	0	0	0
26	MF	(Japan) Kohei Okuno	22	1	3	0	0
27	DF	(Japan) Ryu Takao	8	0	1	0	0
29	MF	(Japan) Leo Takae	11	0	2	0	0
30	DF	(Japan) Naoaki Aoyama	2	0	0	0	0
31	GK	(Japan) Ken Tajiri	17	0	1	0	0
32	MF	(Japan) Ren Shibamoto	29(2)	3	7	0	0
34	MF	(Japan) Yuya Fukuda	9(1)	1	0	0	0
35	DF	(Japan) Tatsuya Yamaguchi	26(3)	0	0	0	0
36	DF	(Japan) Riku Matsuda	30(1)	1	4	1	0
37	FW	(Japan) Haruto Shirai	20(11)	4	1	0	0
41	GK	(Japan) Kosei Tani	11	0	0	0	0
--	MF	(Japan) Ko Ise	6(8)	0	0	0	0
--	MF	(Japan) Shuhei Kawasaki	23(1)	2	0	0	0
--	GK	(Japan) Yukihiro Komai	0	0	0	0	0
--	FW	(Japan) Soma Meshino	7(3)	1	0	0	0
--	DF	(Japan) Keishi Murakami	2(6)	1	0	0	0
--	MF	(Japan) Yuto Nagao	5(6)	0	0	0	0
--	MF	(Japan) Jiro Nakamura	12(5)	3	0	0	0
--	DF	(Japan) Sho Nishimura	2(5)	0	0	0	0
--	DF	(Japan) Shohei Ogushi	10(2)	0	1	0	0
--	DF	(Japan) Hayato Okuda	7(1)	1	0	0	0
--	DF	(Japan) Shinri Ono	11(3)	0	2	0	0
--	DF	(Japan) Naoya Takahashi	8(3)	0	0	0	0
--	DF	(Japan) Hayate Toma	6(1)	0	1	0	0
--	FW	(Japan) Shoji Toyama	7(2)	8	1	0	0
--	FW	(Japan) Dai Tsukamoto	8(13)	5	0	0	0
--	GK	(China) Wang Xinyu	0(1)	0	0	0	0
—	—	Own goals	–	0	–	–	-
Mid-season departures
2	DF	(Japan) Hiroki Noda	9	0	1	0	0
17	MF	(Japan) Mizuki Ichimaru	7	0	1	0	0
18	FW	(Japan) Akito Takagi	17	10	0	0	0
28	MF	(Japan) Takahiro Ko	3	0	1	0	0
38	FW	(Japan) Keito Nakamura	6	1	0	0	0
40	FW	(Japan) Ryotaro Meshino	8	8	0	0	0

Statistics accurate as of match played 8 December 2019

* = all times Japan Standard Time.
