= 2020 Gamba Osaka season =

Gamba Osaka
2020 season
- Chairman: Takashi Yamauchi
- Manager: Tsuneyasu Miyamoto
- J1 League: 2nd
- Emperor's Cup: Runners-up
- J.League Cup: Group stage
- Top goalscorer: League: Shu Kurata; Shinya Yajima; Ademilson; Kazuma Watanabe; Genta Miura (1 goal each); All: Shu Kurata; Shinya Yajima; Ademilson; Kazuma Watanabe; Genta Miura (1 goal each)
- Lowest home attendance: 0
- Average home league attendance: 0
Home colours	Away colours

The 2020 Gamba Osaka season was Gamba Osaka's 27th season in the J1 League and 33rd overall in the Japanese top flight. The team also competed in the J.League Cup and Emperor's Cup competitions.

== Pre-season friendlies ==
Date	Opponents	H / A	Result F-A	Scorers	Attendance
18 January 2020	Okinawa SV	A	4 – 1		
22 January 2020	V-Varen Nagasaki	N	2 – 1		

== First team squad ==
As of 23 February 2020.

Note: Flags indicate national team as defined under FIFA eligibility rules; some limited exceptions apply. Players may hold more than one non-FIFA nationality.

No.	Pos.	Nation	Player
1	GK	JPN	Masaaki Higashiguchi
3	DF	JPN	Gen Shoji
4	DF	JPN	Hiroki Fujiharu
5	DF	JPN	Genta Miura (captain)
7	MF	JPN	Yasuhito Endō
8	MF	JPN	Kosuke Onose
9	FW	BRA	Ademilson
10	MF	JPN	Shu Kurata
11	FW	JPN	Yuji Ono
13	DF	JPN	Shunya Suganuma
14	MF	JPN	Yuya Fukuda
15	MF	JPN	Yosuke Ideguchi
16	GK	JPN	Jun Ichimori
17	MF	JPN	Ryo Shinzato
18	FW	BRA	Patric
19	DF	KOR	Kim Young-gwon
20	FW	JPN	Daisuke Takagi
21	MF	JPN	Shinya Yajima

No.	Pos.	Nation	Player
23	MF	JPN	Mizuki Ichimaru
24	DF	JPN	Keisuke Kurokawa
25	GK	JPN	Kei Ishikawa
26	MF	JPN	Kohei Okuno
27	DF	JPN	Ryu Takao
28	DF	PHI	Tabinas Jefferson
29	MF	JPN	Yuki Yamamoto
30	DF	JPN	Dai Tsukamoto
31	GK	JPN	Haruki Saruta
32	MF	JPN	Ren Shibamoto
33	FW	JPN	Takashi Usami
34	FW	JPN	Shuhei Kawasaki
35	DF	JPN	Tatsuya Yamaguchi
36	DF	JPN	Riku Matsuda
37	FW	JPN	Haruto Shirai
38	FW	JPN	Shoji Toyama
39	FW	JPN	Kazuma Watanabe
40	DF	KOR	Shin Won-ho

== J1 League ==
=== Results summary ===
Overall								Home						Away					
Pld	W	D	L	GF	GA	GD	Pts	W	D	L	GF	GA	GD	W	D	L	GF	GA	GD
32	19	5	8	44	40	+4	62	8	2	6	19	21	−2	11	3	2	25	19	+6

Last updated: 6 December 2020.

=== League table ===
Pos	Team	Pld	W	D	L	GF	GA	GD	Pts	Qualification or relegation
1	Kawasaki Frontale (C)	34	26	5	3	88	31	+57	83	Qualification for AFC Champions League group stage (Note: Since the winners of the 2020 Emperor's Cup, Kawasaki Frontale, qualified for the Champions League group stage, the spot given to the Emperor's Cup winners (Champions League group stage) was passed to the third-placed team and the spot given to the third-place team (Champions League play-off round) was passed to the fourth-placed team.)
2	Gamba Osaka	34	20	5	9	46	42	+4	65	Qualification for AFC Champions League group stage
3	Nagoya Grampus	34	19	6	9	45	28	+17	63	Qualification for AFC Champions League group stage
4	Cerezo Osaka	34	18	6	10	46	37	+9	60	Qualification for AFC Champions League play-off round
5	Kashima Antlers	34	18	5	11	55	44	+11	59	

Source: J.League Data Site
Rules for classification: 1) Points; 2) Goal difference; 3) Head-to-head points; 4) Head-to-head goal difference; 5) Head-to-head goal scored; 6) Number of wins; 7) Goals scored; 8) Fair-play points.
(C) Champions

=== Results ===
23 February 2020 1	Yokohama F. Marinos	1 - 2	Gamba Osaka	Yokohama
13:00 JST	Marcos Júnior 74'	Report	Kurata 6'; Yajima 34'	Stadium: Nissan Stadium; Attendance: 34,521; Referee: (Japan) Koichiro Fukushima

4 July 2020 2	Gamba Osaka	1 - 2	Cerezo Osaka	Suita
18:00 JST	Ademilson 68' (pen.)	Report	Okuno 45+2'; Maruhashi 62'; Kimoto (yellow card) 66'	Stadium: Suita City Football Stadium; Attendance: 0 Referee: (Japan) Ryuji Sato

8 July 2020 3	Nagoya Grampus	2 - 2	Gamba Osaka	Toyota
19:30 JST	Yonemoto (yellow card) 3'; Mateus 16'; Gabriel Xavier 31'; Inagaki (yellow card) 70'	Report	Miura 6'; Watanabe 90+2'	Stadium: Toyota Stadium; Attendance: 0 Referee: (Japan) Yudai Yamamoto

12 July 2020 4	Shimizu S-Pulse	1 - 2	Gamba Osaka	Shizuoka
18:00 JST	Tatsuta (yellow card) 58' (goal) 84'	Report	Miura (yellow card) 32'; Onose 40'; Watanabe 89'	Stadium: IAI Stadium Nihondaira; Attendance: 4,131; Referee: (Japan) Massaki Iemoto

18 July 2020 5	Gamba Osaka	2 - 1	Oita Trinita	Suita
19:00 JST	Usami 37' (pen.); Ademilson 48'	Report	Watari 33'	Stadium: Suita City Football Stadium; Attendance: 4,395; Referee: (Japan) Nobutsugu Murakami

22 July 2020 6	Gamba Osaka	1 - 0	Sanfrecce Hiroshima	Suita
19:00 JST	Miura 41'	Report	Douglas Viera (yellow card) 61'	Stadium: Suita City Football Stadium; Attendance: 4,142; Referee: (Japan) Ryuji Sato

26 July 2020 7	Vissel Kobe	0 - 2	Gamba Osaka	Kobe
19:00 JST		Report	Ono 62'; Fukuda (yellow card) 75'; Matsuda (yellow card) 75'; Usami 86'	Stadium: Noevir Stadium Kobe; Attendance: 4,746; Referee: (Japan) Yudai Yamamoto

1 August 2020 8	Gamba Osaka	0 - 1	Kawasaki Frontale	Suita
19:00 JST		Report	Oshima 48'	Stadium: Suita City Football Stadium; Attendance: 4,925; Referee: (Japan) Koichiro Fukushima

8 August 2020 9	Gamba Osaka	2 - 1	Yokohama FC	Suita
19:00 JST	Ademilson 34'; Onose (yellow card) 50'; Kim Young-gwon (yellow card) 81'; Patric 90+4'	Report	Koki Saito 60'	Stadium: Suita City Football Stadium; Attendance: 4,638; Referee: (Japan) Koei Koya

19 August 2020 10	Gamba Osaka	1 - 3	Urawa Reds	Suita
19:00 JST	Ideguchi 60'; Higashiguchi (yellow card) 89'	Report	Sekine 24'; Leonardo 34' (pen.); Muto 56'; Sugimoto (yellow card) 89'	Stadium: Suita City Football Stadium; Attendance: 4,721; Referee: (Japan) Hiroki Kasahara

23 August 2020 11	Kashima Antlers	1 - 1	Gamba Osaka	Kashima
19:00 JST	Uchida (yellow card) 39'; Inukai (yellow card) 89' (goal) 90+5'	Report	Onose 6'; Higashiguchi (yellow card) 47'; Ono (yellow card) 87'	Stadium: Kashima Soccer Stadium; Attendance: 4,949; Referee: (Japan) Yusuke Araki

29 August 2020 12	Gamba Osaka	1 - 3	FC Tokyo	Suita
19:00 JST	Usami 43'; Ideguchi (yellow card) 50'	Report	Diego Oliveira 8'; Joan Oumari (yellow card) 56'; Leandro 73' (pen.); Adaílton 81'; Hayashi (yellow card) 90+3'; Watanabe (yellow card) 90+6'	Stadium: Suita City Football Stadium; Attendance: 4,967; Referee: (Japan) Hajime Matsuo

5 September 2020 13	Vegalta Sendai	1 - 4	Gamba Osaka	Sendai
18:30 JST	Alexandre Guedes 4'; Simão Mate (yellow card) 87'; Nishimura (yellow card) 90+2'	Report	Yamamoto 8'; Ademilson 15'; Kurata 73'; Ideguchi 85'	Stadium: Yurtec Stadium Sendai; Attendance: 2,871; Referee: (Japan) Jumpei Iida

9 September 2020 14	Kashiwa Reysol	3 - 0	Gamba Osaka	Kashiwa
19:00 JST	Olunga 2'; Esaka 40' 62'	Report	Fujiharu (yellow card) 42'	Stadium: Sankyo Frontier Kashiwa Stadium; Attendance: 2,608; Referee: (Japan) Hiroyoshi Takayama

13 September 2020 15	Gamba Osaka	0 - 1	Shonan Bellmare	Suita
19:00 JST		Report	Saito (yellow card) 11'; Okamoto (yellow card) 56'; Ono 74'	Stadium: Suita City Football Stadium; Attendance: 4,788; Referee: (Japan) Koei Koya

19 September 2020 16	Consadole Sapporo	0 - 1	Gamba Osaka	Sapporo
14:00 JST		Report	Watanabe 78'	Stadium: Sapporo Atsubetsu Stadium; Attendance: 2,749; Referee: (Japan) Hiroyuki Kimura

23 September 2020 17	Gamba Osaka	2 - 1	Nagoya Grampus	Suita
19:00 JST	Takao (yellow card) 35'; Yamamoto 53'; Usami 87'	Report	Kanazaki 21'; Yonemoto (yellow card) 41'; Nakatani (yellow card) 50'; Oh Jae-suk (yellow card) 79'	Stadium: Suita City Football Stadium; Attendance: 5,153; Referee: (Japan) Hajime Matsuo

27 September 2020 18	Sanfrecce Hiroshima	1 - 2	Gamba Osaka	Hiroshima
18:00 JST	Leandro Pereira 70'	Report	Kurata 16'; Patric 20'	Stadium: Edion Stadium; Attendance: 4,104; Referee: (Japan) Koichiro Fukushima

3 October 2020 19	Gamba Osaka	2 - 0	Kashima Antlers	Suita
19:00 JST	Patric 66' (pen.); Watanabe 90+3'	Report	Everaldo (yellow card) 67'	Stadium: Suita City Football Stadium; Attendance: 9,313; Referee: (Japan) Ryuji Sato

7 October 2020 20	Sagan Tosu	1 - 2	Gamba Osaka	Tosu
19:00 JST	Lopez 90+2'	Report	Watanabe 21' 34'; Takao (yellow card) 74'	Stadium: Ekimae Real Estate Stadium; Attendance: 3,601; Referee: (Japan) Akihiko Ikeuchi

10 October 2020 21	FC Tokyo	0 - 1	Gamba Osaka	Chōfu
14:00 JST		Report	Ademilson 41' (pen.); Kim Young-gwon (yellow card) 78'	Stadium: Ajinomoto Stadium; Attendance: 8,166; Referee: (Japan) Minoru Tōjō

14 October 2020 22	Gamba Osaka	1 - 1	Yokohama F. Marinos	Suita
19:00 JST	Usami 45+1' (pen.)	Report	Kim Young-gwon 26' (o.g.)	Stadium: Suita City Football Stadium; Attendance: 6,455; Referee: (Japan) Nobutsugu Murakami

18 October 2020 23	Oita Trinita	0 - 1	Gamba Osaka	Ōita
14:00 JST		Report	Patric 72'	Stadium: Showa Denko Dome Oita; Attendance: 8,570; Referee: (Japan) Yoshiro Imamura

24 October 2020 24	Gamba Osaka	2 - 1	Kashiwa Reysol	Suita
16:00 JST	Fukuda (yellow card) 30'; Kim Seung-gyu 52' (o.g.); Ademilson 89'	Report	Olunga 80'	Stadium: Suita City Football Stadium; Attendance: 10,062; Referee: (Japan) Futoshi Nakamura

31 October 2020 25	Gamba Osaka	2 - 1	Consadole Sapporo	Suita
18:00 JST	Ideguchi 16'; Onose (yellow card) 37'; Patric 62'; Suganuma (yellow card) 84'	Report	Douglas Oliveira 9'; Lucas Fernandes (yellow card) 46'; Miyazawa (yellow card) 75'; Shirai (yellow card) 90+3'	Stadium: Suita City Football Stadium; Attendance: 16,183; Referee: (Japan) Ryuji Sato

3 November 2020 26	Cerezo Osaka	1 - 1	Gamba Osaka	Osaka
13:00 JST	Toyokawa 34'; Jonjić (yellow card) 50'	Report	Kim Young-gwon (yellow card) 4'; Ideguchi 32'; Patric (yellow card) 50'; Miura (yellow card) 78'; Fukuda (yellow card) 79'; Suganuma (yellow card) 90+5'	Stadium: Yanmar Stadium Nagai; Attendance: 19,553; Referee: (Japan) Hiroyuki Kimura

11 November 2020 27	Gamba Osaka	1 - 0	Vissel Kobe	Suita
18:00 JST	Patric 27'	Report		Stadium: Suita City Football Stadium; Attendance: 11,579; Referee: (Japan) Jumpei Iida

14 November 2020 28	Gamba Osaka	0 - 4	Vegalta Sendai	Suita
14:00 JST	Shoji (yellow card) 68'	Report	Nagasawa 17' 44' 75'; Yanagi 89'	Stadium: Suita City Football Stadium; Attendance: 11,567; Referee: (Japan) Minoru Tōjō

22 November 2020 29	Urawa Reds	1 - 2	Gamba Osaka	Saitama
15:00 JST	Makino 62'	Report	Usami 66'; Takao 81'	Stadium: Saitama Stadium 2002; Attendance: 20,288; Referee: (Japan) Masaaki Iemoto

25 November 2020 30	Kawasaki Frontale	5 - 0	Gamba Osaka	Kawasaki
17:30 JST	Leandro Damião 22'; Ienaga 45' 49' 73'; Saitō 90'	Report		Stadium: Kawasaki Todoroki Stadium; Attendance: 11,360; Referee: (Japan) Yuichi Nishimura

29 November 2020 31	Gamba Osaka	1 - 1	Sagan Tosu	Suita
16:00 JST	Patric 77'; Kurata (yellow card) 79'	Report	Sagara 11'; Eduardo (yellow card) 52'; Harakawa (yellow card) 90+1'	Stadium: Suita City Football Stadium; Attendance: 10,555; Referee: (Japan) Ryuji Sato

6 December 2020 32	Shonan Bellmare	1 - 2	Gamba Osaka	Hiratsuka
14:00 JST	Nakagawa 35' (pen.); Kaneko (yellow card) 54'	Report	Fukuda 6' (yellow card) 90'; Shoji (yellow card) 34'; Takao (yellow card) 44'; Patric 66'	Stadium: Shonan BMW Stadium Hiratsuka; Attendance: 6,461; Referee: (Japan) Nobutsugu Murakami

16 December 2020 33	Yokohama FC	0 – 2	Gamba Osaka	Yokohama
18:00 JST		Report	Kurata 1'; Shoji (yellow card) 71'; Patric 81'	Stadium: NHK Spring Mitsuzawa Football Stadium; Attendance: 3,898; Referee: (Japan) Yuichi Nishimura

19 December 2020 34	Gamba Osaka	0 – 2	Shimizu S-Pulse	Suita
13:00 JST			Kawamoto 49'; Kaneko 64'	Stadium: Suita City Football Stadium; Attendance: 15,252

== Squad statistics ==
=== Goal scorers ===
The list is sorted by shirt number when total goals are equal.

Rnk	Pos	No.	Player	J1 League	Emperor's Cup	J.League Cup	Champions League	Total
1	FW	9	(Brazil) Ademilson	1	0	0	0	1
1	MF	10	(Japan) Shu Kurata	1	0	0	0	1
1	MF	21	(Japan) Shinya Yajima	1	0	0	0	1
1	FW	39	(Japan) Kazuma Watanabe	1	0	0	0	1
1	DF	5	(Japan) Genta Miura	1	0	0	0	1
TOTALS				5	0	0	0	5

Last updated: 8 July 2020.
