= Keisuke Kurokawa =

Japanese footballer (born 1997)

Keisuke Kurokawa 黒川 圭介
Personal information
- Full name: Keisuke Kurokawa
- Date of birth: April 13, 1997 (age 29)
- Place of birth: Akashi, Hyōgo, Japan
- Height: 1.73 m (5 ft 8 in)
- Position: Left back

Team information
- Current team: D.C. United
- Number: 6

Youth career
- FC Takatsu
- FC Rios
- Vissel Kobe Itami
- 2013–2015: Osaka Toin High School

College career
Years	Team	Apps	(Gls)
2016–2019	Kansai University		

Senior career*
Years	Team	Apps	(Gls)
2019–2025	Gamba Osaka	151	(6)
2026–	D.C. United	24	(0)
- * Club domestic league appearances and goals as of 17 September 2026

Keisuke Kurokawa (黒川 圭介, Kurokawa Keisuke; born 13 April 1997) is a Japanese footballer who plays for D.C. United in Major League Soccer. His regular playing position is a left back.

== Career ==
Ahead of his senior year at Kansai University, Kurokawa signed on as a specially designated player for Gamba Osaka ahead of the 2019 season. He made his first two appearances for the team in the 2019 J.League Cup, first in the 4–1 victory over Júbilo Iwata on April 24 and later in a 3–1 win over Shimizu S-Pulse the following month. He made his J.League debut shortly after, coming on as a 71st-minute substitute for Oh Jae-suk in the 3–1 loss away to Sagan Tosu on 11 May 2019.

== Career statistics ==
Last update: 5 July 2022

Club performance			League		Cup		League Cup		Continental		Total	
Season	Club	League	Apps	Goals	Apps	Goals	Apps	Goals	Apps	Goals		
Japan			League		Emperor's Cup		League Cup		Continental		Total	
2019	Gamba Osaka	J1	1	0	0	0	2	0	−		3	0
2020	Gamba Osaka	J1	2	0	0	0	2	0	−		4	0
2021	Gamba Osaka	J1	19	0	3	0	1	0	6 (Note: appearances at the AFC Champions League)	0	29	0
2022	Gamba Osaka	J1	16	2	1	0	4	0	−		21	2
Career total			40	2	4	0	10	0	6	0	57	2
