= Tatsuya Tanaka (footballer, born 1992) =

Japanese footballer (born 1992)

Tatsuya Tanaka 田中 達也
Personal information
- Full name: Tatsuya Tanaka
- Date of birth: June 9, 1992 (age 34)
- Place of birth: Fukuoka, Japan
- Height: 1.72 m (5 ft 8 in)
- Position: Midfielder

Team information
- Current team: Toko Customs United (Head coach)

Youth career
- 2008–2010: Higashi Fukuoka Jikyokan; Junior High School
- 2011–2014: Kyushu Sangyo University

Senior career*
Years	Team	Apps	(Gls)
2011–2013	Roasso Kumamoto	4	(0)
2015–2018	Roasso Kumamoto	73	(10)
2016	→ FC Gifu (loan)	18	(1)
2019	Gamba Osaka	8	(0)
2019–2020	Oita Trinita	48	(9)
2021	Urawa Reds	28	(3)
2022–2024	Avispa Fukuoka	33	(1)
2024–2025	Ratchaburi	29	(8)
2025	Toko Customs United	6	(0)

Managerial career
- 2025–: Toko Customs United
- * Club domestic league appearances and goals as of 20 April 2026

Tatsuya Tanaka (田中 達也, born June 9, 1992) is a Japanese football retired footballer and football coach for Toko Customs United in Thai League 3. His regular playing positions are as a wide midfielder or a wing-back. Tanaka has previously played for Roasso Kumamoto, FC Gifu, Gamba Osaka, Oita Trinita, Urawa Reds, and Avispa Fukuoka.

== Club career ==
A native of Fukuoka in northern-Kyushu, Tanaka entered Kyushu Sangyo University in 2011. While completing his university studies, he was a specially designated player for Roasso Kumamoto in the J2 League, making 4 appearances between 2011 and 2013. After graduation, he signed a full-time contract with Roasso ahead of the 2015 season. He scored once in ten appearances in his first season as a professional but struggled to secure regular playing time. As a result, he was loaned to fellow J2 side FC Gifu for the 2016 season, where he played 18 times and scored once.

Upon returning to Kumamoto in 2017, Tanaka began to play more regularly, making 21 appearances that year. He then enjoyed a career-best season in 2018, playing 40 of Roasso's 42 league matches and scoring 9 goals. Despite his personal success, his efforts were not enough to prevent his team from relegation to Japan's third tier.

Tanaka would not join Roasso in the J3 league, as his impressive performances as a wing-back caught the attention of J1 side Gamba Osaka, who added him to their squad ahead of the 2019 season.

== Club statistics ==
As of 2 March 2022.

Club	Season	League			Cup		League Cup		Total	
Club	Season	Division	Apps	Goals	Apps	Goals	Apps	Goals	Apps	Goals
Japan			League		Emperor's Cup		J.League Cup		Total	
Roasso Kumamoto	2011	J2 League	3	0	–		–		3	0
Roasso Kumamoto	2012	J2 League	0	0	–		–		0	0
Roasso Kumamoto	2013	J2 League	1	0	–		–		1	0
Roasso Kumamoto	2015	J2 League	10	1	1	1	–		11	2
Roasso Kumamoto	Total		14	1	1	1	0	0	15	2
FC Gifu (loan)	2016	J2 League	18	1	1	0	–		19	1
Roasso Kumamoto	2017	J2 League	21	0	1	0	–		22	0
Roasso Kumamoto	2018	J2 League	42	9	1	0	–		43	9
Roasso Kumamoto	Total		63	9	2	0	0	0	65	9
Gamba Osaka	2019	J1 League	8	0	1	0	6	2	15	2
Oita Trinita	2019	J1 League	15	1	–		–		15	1
Oita Trinita	2020	J1 League	33	8	–		1	0	34	8
Oita Trinita	Total		48	9	0	0	1	0	49	9
Urawa Red Diamonds	2021	J1 League	28	4	3	0	10	0	41	4
Avispa Fukuoka	2022	J1 League	2	0	0	0	1	0	3	0
Career Total			181	24	7	1	18	2	206	27
