= Ademilson =

Brazilian footballer (born 1994)

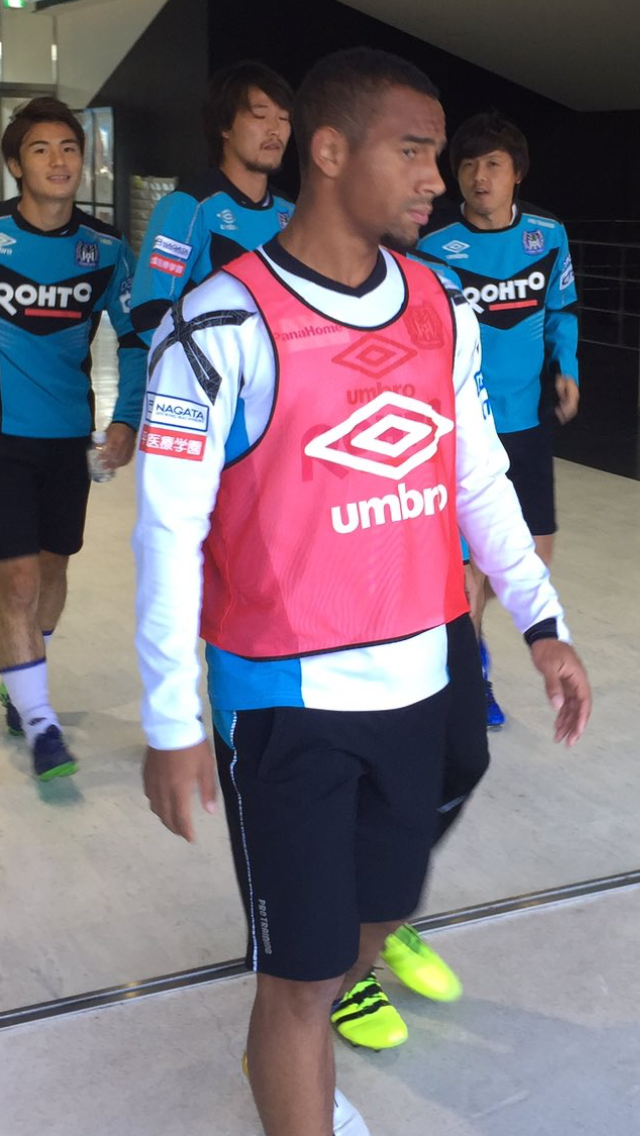
- Ademilson in 2016

Personal information
- Full name: Ademilson Braga Bispo Junior
- Date of birth: 9 January 1994 (age 32)
- Place of birth: Cubatão, Brazil
- Height: 1.79 m (5 ft 10 in)
- Position: Forward

Team information
- Current team: Operário Ferroviário
- Number: 99

Youth career
- 2005–2012: São Paulo

Senior career*
Years	Team	Apps	(Gls)
2012–2016	São Paulo	57	(11)
2015	→ Yokohama F. Marinos (loan)	33	(8)
2016	→ Gamba Osaka (loan)	29	(9)
2017–2020	Gamba Osaka	92	(25)
2021–2023	Wuhan Three Towns	50	(27)
2023	Machida Zelvia	3	(1)
2024	Avaí	14	(1)
2025	Água Santa	11	(2)
2025–	Operário Ferroviário	22	(1)

International career^{‡}
2011	Brazil U17	7	(5)
2012–2013	Brazil U20	15	(7)
2014	Brazil U23	1	(1)
- * Club domestic league appearances and goals as of 17 December 2025 ‡ National team caps and goals as of 29 September 2014

Ademilson Braga Bispo Junior (born 9 January 1994), known as Ademilson, is a Brazilian professional footballer who plays for Campeonato Brasileiro Série B club Operário Ferroviário as a forward. He has previously played for São Paulo in his homeland, then Yokohama F. Marinos and Gamba Osaka in Japan as well as Wuhan Three Towns in China.

== Career ==
=== São Paulo ===
Ademilson made his with São Paulo debut on 2 February 2012 in a Campeonato Paulista tie against the Guarani. On 22 July 2012, he made his Campeonato Brasileiro debut, Ademilson scored a goal against Figueirense in a game at the Orlando Scarpelli Stadium. His first international goal was scored on 1 August 2012, when São Paulo played against Bahia, in the 2012 Copa Sudamericana.

On 23 April 2014, in the first leg of the second round of the Copa do Brasil, in a 2–1 loss against CRB, Ademilson scored a beautiful bicycle kick goal.

=== Yokohama F. Marinos ===
Ademilson joined J1 League side Yokohama F. Marinos on loan for the 2015 season and scored 8 times in 33 matches to help them to 7th in the overall standings.

=== Gamba Osaka ===
Ademilson was loaned to another J League side, Gamba Osaka, in 2016, and debuted for them in their 3–1 loss to Sanfrecce Hiroshima in the 2016 Japanese Super Cup on 20 February of that year. He played his first league match for the men in blue and black a week later in a 1–0 home defeat to Kashima Antlers and went on to score 9 league goals in 29 league games and 13 in 40 in all competitions in his first season in Osaka.

He was signed by Gamba permanently on 10 October 2016, for a US$3.15 million fee. His next two years in Osaka were hit by injury as he missed much of the second half of 2017 and the first half of 2018 due to knee problems. As such he found the back of the net just four times in 22 league matches in 2017 before bagging 5 goals in 17 league games in 2018 as Gamba finished 10th and 9th respectively in the final standings.

=== Machida Zelvia ===
After spending few years in China with Wuhan Three Towns, it was announced on 5 September 2023 that Ademilson signed for Machida Zelvia.

=== Avaí ===
On 23 February 2024, Ademilson returned to Brazil and signed a with Campeonato Brasileiro Série B club Avaí.

== Style of play ==
After showing his qualities in several Brazilian youth football competitions, according to himself, Ademilson thought of his style of play as similar to Luís Fabiano, a former colleague of his at São Paulo FC. Both of them know to use physical force, along with their ability and speed. Besides this, for Ademilson, like his idol, he also has the guts to run and fight in order to win a game. From his own words: "I know I have this quality (force) and I work a lot to improve always in everything and I try to improve my physique, to make it one of my stronger points." Despite still being a teenager Ademilson attracted attention from top European football clubs . In June 2013, there was reported interest from Italian giants Milan. According to newspaper Il Sussudiario, his style of play was similar to Cameroonian international Samuel Eto'o.

== Career statistics ==
As of match played 23 February 2025

Appearances and goals by club, season and competition
Club	Season	League			State League		National cup		League cup		Continental		Other		Total	
Club	Season	Division	Apps	Goals	Apps	Goals	Apps	Goals	Apps	Goals	Apps	Goals	Apps	Goals	Apps	Goals
São Paulo	2012	Serie A	23	3	2	0	1	0	—		6	1	—		32	4
São Paulo	2013	Serie A	21	2	9	2	0	0	—		8	2	—		39	6
São Paulo	2014	Serie A	10	1	15	3	5	1	—		1	0	—		31	5
São Paulo	2015	Serie A	—		1	0	—		—		—		—		1	0
São Paulo	Total		54	6	27	5	6	1	—		15	3	—		102	15
Yokohama Marinos (loan)	2015	J1 League	33	8	—		3	2	3	0	—		—		39	10
Gamba Osaka (loan)	2016	J1 League	29	9	—		2	0	4	3	4	1	1	0	40	13
Gamba Osaka	2017	J1 League	22	4	—		2	0	2	0	6	2	—		32	6
Gamba Osaka	2018	J1 League	17	5	—		0	0	4	0	—		—		21	5
Gamba Osaka	2019	J1 League	32	10	—		0	0	9	1	—		—		41	11
Gamba Osaka	2020	J1 League	21	6	—		0	0	0	0	—		—		21	6
Gamba Osaka	Total		92	25	—		2	0	15	1	6	2	—		115	28
Wuhan Three Towns	2021	China League One	24	11	—		0	0	—		—		—		24	11
Wuhan Three Towns	2022	Chinese Super League	27	11	—		0	0	—		—		—		27	11
Wuhan Three Towns	2023	Chinese Super League	13	5	—		1	0	—		—		1	0	15	5
Wuhan Three Towns	Total		64	27	—		1	0	—		—		1	0	66	27
Machida Zelvia	2023	J2 League	3	1	—		—		—		—		—		3	1
Avaí	2024	Serie B	10	0	4	1	—		—		—		—		14	1
Água Santa	2025	Serie D	—		11	2	—		—		—		—		11	2
Career total			285	76	42	8	14	3	22	4	25	6	2	0	390	97

== Honours ==
São Paulo

- Copa Sudamericana: 2012

Wuhan Three Towns

- China League One: 2021
- Chinese Super League: 2022
- Chinese FA Super Cup: 2023

Brazil U20

- 8 Nations International Tournament: 2012
- Toulon Tournament: 2013, 2014
