= Naoaki Aoyama =

Japanese footballer

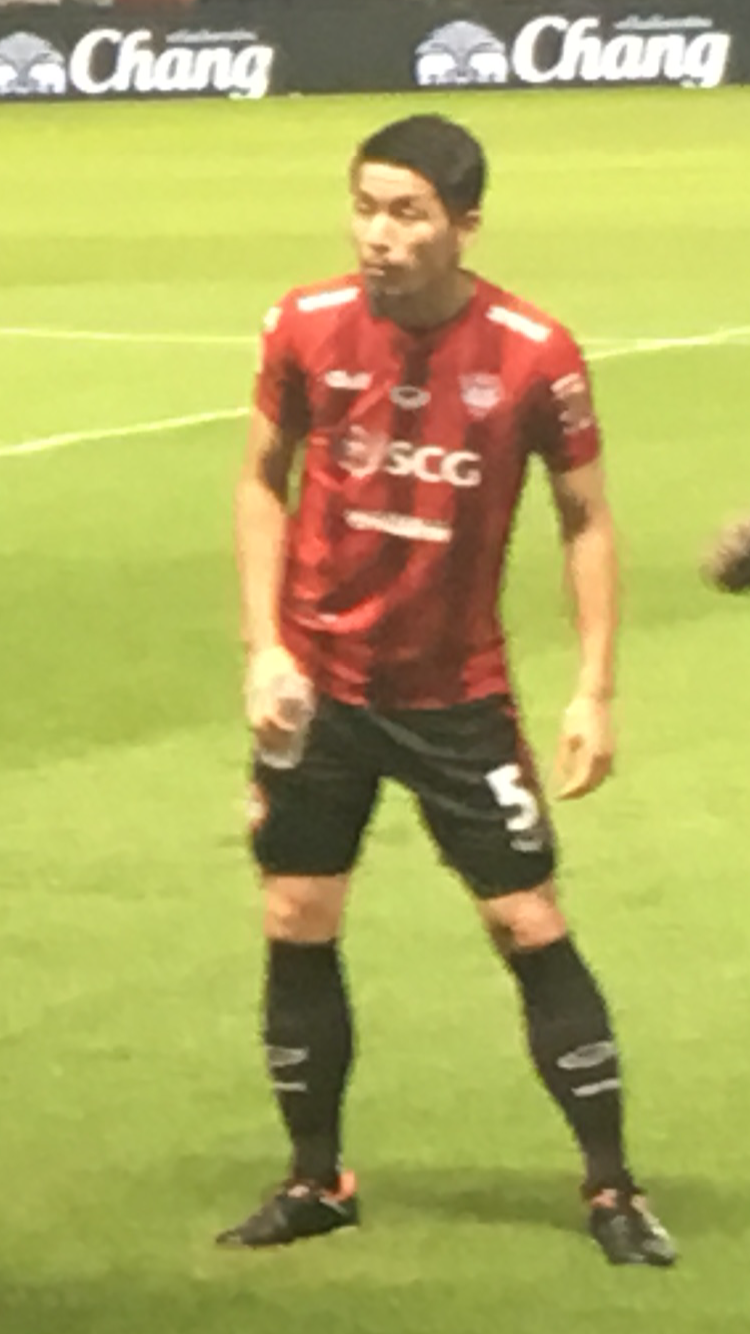

Personal information
- Full name: Naoaki Aoyama
- Date of birth: July 18, 1986 (age 40)
- Place of birth: Ichinomiya, Aichi, Japan
- Height: 1.82 m (5 ft 11 1/2 in)
- Position: Centre-back

Youth career
- 2002–2004: Maebashi Ikuei High School

Senior career*
Years	Team	Apps	(Gls)
2005–2010	Shimizu S-Pulse	121	(5)
2011–2012	Yokohama F. Marinos	17	(0)
2013–2014	Ventforet Kofu	59	(4)
2015–2018	Muangthong United	108	(4)
2019	Gamba Osaka	0	(0)
2019	Gamba Osaka U-23	1	(0)
2020	Kagoshima United FC	18	(0)
Total		324	(13)

International career
2006	Japan U-23	11	(2)
Medal record
Shimizu S-Pulse
Runner-up	J.League Cup	2008
Runner-up	Emperor's Cup	2005
Runner-up	Emperor's Cup	2010
- * Club domestic league appearances and goals as of 01:40, 23 January 2021 (UTC)

Naoaki Aoyama (青山 直晃, Aoyama Naoaki; born July 18, 1986) is a Japanese retired football player. His playing position is centre-back. He has previously played for Japanese sides Shimizu S-Pulse, Yokohama F. Marinos and Ventforet Kofu as well as Thailand's Muangthong United.

== Club career ==
After graduating from Maebashi Ikuei High School in 2004, Aoyama signed full professional terms with Shimizu S-Pulse the following year and went on to become a regular first team starting member, playing 121 league games in 6 seasons in Shizuoka.

He transferred to Yokohama F. Marinos ahead of the 2011 season, but struggled to establish himself in their top team, playing just 10 and 7 league games respectively in his 2 years at the Nissan Stadium. 2013 saw him move north to Yamanashi to start a 2-season spell with Ventforet Kofu where he scored 4 goals in 59 league appearances which saw them finish 15th in 2013 and 13th the following year.

His career took a very different turn in 2015 as he moved to Thailand to sign for Muangthong United. His spell with the Kirins was to prove to be highly successful, winning the Thai Premier League in 2016 and the League Cup in 2016 and 2017. He played more than 100 games in total in his 4 years in Thailand.

Aoyama returned to Japan ahead of the 2019 season and joined Gamba Osaka.

== Club statistics ==
Last Updated: 10 February 2019.

Club performance			League		Cup		League Cup		Continental		Total	
Season	Club	League	Apps	Goals	Apps	Goals	Apps	Goals	Apps	Goals	Apps	Goals
2005	Shimizu S-Pulse	J1 League	6	2	5	0	1	0	-	-	12	2
2006	Shimizu S-Pulse	J1 League	29	0	1	0	2	0	-	-	32	0
2007	Shimizu S-Pulse	J1 League	30	1	3	2	3	0	-	-	36	3
2008	Shimizu S-Pulse	J1 League	33	1	3	0	9	0	-	-	45	1
2009	Shimizu S-Pulse	J1 League	23	1	0	0	9	1	-	-	32	2
2010	Shimizu S-Pulse	J1 League	0	0	0	0	0	0	-	-	0	0
2011	Yokohama F. Marinos	J1 League	10	0	0	0	4	1	-	-	14	1
2012	Yokohama F. Marinos	J1 League	7	0	0	0	4	0	-	-	11	0
2013	Ventforet Kofu	J1 League	29	2	1	0	0	0	-	-	30	2
2014	Ventforet Kofu	J1 League	30	2	0	0	5	0	-	-	30	2
2015	Muangthong United	Thai League 1	29	1	6	0	2	0	-	-	37	1
2016	Muangthong United	Thai League 1	17	1	2	0	3	0	2	0	22	1
2017	Muangthong United	Thai League 1	28	2	0	0	0	0	8	0	36	2
2018	Muangthong United	Thai League 1	29	0	0	0	0	0	-	-	29	0
2019	Gamba Osaka	J1 League	0	0	0	0	0	0	-	-	0	0
2020	Kagoshima United FC	J3 League	0	0	0	0	0	0	-	-	0	0
Career total			300	13	21	2	42	2	10	0	366	17

== Honours ==
Muangthong United

- Thai League 1
  - Winners (1): 2016
  - Runners-up (1): 2015
- Thai FA Cup
  - Runners-up (1): 2015
- Kor Royal Cup
  - Runners-up (1): 2016
- Thai League Cup
  - Champions (2): 2016, 2017
- Thailand Champions Cup
  - Champions (1): 2017
- Mekong Club Championship
  - Champions (1): 2017
