= Ryu Takao =

Japanese footballer

Ryu Takao 髙尾 瑠
Personal information
- Full name: Ryu Takao
- Date of birth: November 9, 1996 (age 29)
- Place of birth: Aichi, Japan
- Height: 1.81 m (5 ft 11 1/2 in)
- Position: Right back

Team information
- Current team: Hokkaido Consadole Sapporo
- Number: 2

Youth career
- AFC Agui
- Nagoya Grampus

College career
Years	Team	Apps	(Gls)
2015–2018	Kwansei Gakuin University		

Senior career*
Years	Team	Apps	(Gls)
2019–2023	Gamba Osaka	81	(1)
2019–2023	Gamba Osaka U-23	8	(0)
2024–	Hokkaido Consadole Sapporo	77	(1)
- * Club domestic league appearances and goals as of 13 August 2026

Ryu Takao (髙尾 瑠, Takao Ryu; born 9 November 1996) is a Japanese footballer who plays for Hokkaido Consadole Sapporo in the J1 League. His regular playing position is a right back.

== Career ==
After graduating from Kwansei Gakuin University, Takao signed for Gamba Osaka ahead of the 2019 season. He started his first campaign with the men in blue and black playing for their Under-23 side in J3 League, debuting in week 1 of the 2019 campaign, a home 2-2 draw with Vanraure Hachinohe on 10 March. Takao made his Gamba debut against Shimizu S-Pulse in the J.League Cup on 8 May 2019. On 18 May 2019, he made his J1 league debut against Cerezo Osaka. On 22 November 2020, Takao scored his first league goal against Urawa Red Diamonds, scoring in the 81st minute.

On 10 January 2024, Takao was announced at Hokkaido Consadole Sapporo.

== Career statistics ==
Last update: 5 November 2022

Club performance			League		Cup		League Cup		Continental		Other		Total	
Season	Club	League	Apps	Goals	Apps	Goals	Apps	Goals	Apps	Goals	Apps	Goals	Apps	Goals
Japan			League		Emperor's Cup		League Cup		AFC		Other		Total	
2019	Gamba Osaka	J1 League	18	0	1	0	5	0	—		—		24	0
2020	Gamba Osaka	J1 League	32	1	2	0	1	0	—		—		35	1
2021	Gamba Osaka	J1 League	19	0	3	0	1	0	1	0	1	0	25	0
2022	Gamba Osaka	J1 League	26	0	2	0	1	0	—		—		29	0
Career total			95	1	8	0	8	0	1	0	1	0	113	1

== Reserves performance ==
Last Updated: 11 March 2019

Club performance			League		Total	
Season	Club	League	Apps	Goals	Apps	Goals
Japan			League		Total	
2019	Gamba Osaka U-23	J3	1	0	1	0
Career total			1	0	1	0
