= Kazuma Watanabe =

Japanese footballer (born 1986)

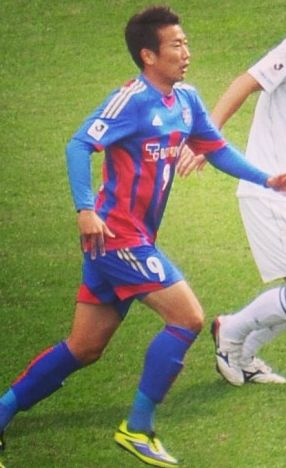
- Watanabe playing for FC Tokyo in 2013

Personal information
- Full name: Kazuma Watanabe
- Date of birth: 10 August 1986 (age 40)
- Place of birth: Nagasaki, Japan
- Height: 1.82 m (5 ft 11 1/2 in)
- Position: Forward

Youth career
- 2002–2004: Kunimi High School

College career
Years	Team	Apps	(Gls)
2005–2008	Waseda University		

Senior career*
Years	Team	Apps	(Gls)
2009–2011	Yokohama F. Marinos	88	(28)
2012–2014	FC Tokyo	86	(26)
2015–2018	Vissel Kobe	114	(34)
2018–2020	Gamba Osaka	63	(11)
2021–2022	Yokohama FC	53	(7)
2023–2024	Matsumoto Yamaga FC	20	(2)

International career^{‡}
2010	Japan	1	(0)
Medal record
Representing Japan
AFC U-19 Championship
Bronze medal – third place	2004 Malaysia
- * Club domestic league appearances and goals as of 20 November 2022 ‡ National team caps and goals as of 10 January 2010

Kazuma Watanabe (渡邉 千真, Watanabe Kazuma; born 10 August 1986) is a Japanese footballer who plays for Matsumoto Yamaga FC in the J3 League. He plays as a centre-forward and has previously had spells with Yokohama F. Marinos, FC Tokyo, Vissel Kobe and Gamba Osaka.

His older brother Daigo Watanabe was also a professional soccer player with Kyoto Sanga FC, Omiya Ardija, Busan IPark and Kamatamare Sanuki.

== Club career ==
Watanabe made his J-League debut for Yokohama F. Marinos against Sanfrecce Hiroshima on 7 March 2009 and scored his first league goal. He kept up his scoring exploits throughout the 2009 season and finished with 13 league goals which broke the previous record for a rookie player set by Shoji Jo in 1994. This earned him the young player of the year award 2009. During his next two seasons in Yokohama, he did not quite hit the heights of his debut year, but he did go on to amass a respectable 15 goals in 54 league games across 2010 and 2011.

Watanabe was transferred to FC Tokyo ahead of the 2012 season and in total he spent 3 seasons in Japan's capital. 2013 was a highlight for him as he bagged 17 goals in 33 league games to help the men in blue and red finish in eighth place in the final standings. However, his other two seasons with Tokyo were rather forgettable, he scored six times in 27 league games during his first year at the Ajinomoto Stadium in 2012 before finishing off his career in the capital by netting just three times in 26 league appearances.

This loss of form in 2014 saw him shipped off to join Vissel Kobe ahead of the 2015 campaign. The move west seemed to do him good as he was immediately back into double figures in terms of goals scored, ending the 2015 season with 10 goals in 28 league appearances. The following year was even better for him personally as he scored 12 goals in 33 league games, which helped Kobe to an impressive seventh-place finish in the overall standings in 2016. That would prove to be the pinnacle of his career in the port city as he followed it up with eight goals in 34 league games in 2017 before netting just four times in 19 games in the first half of the 2018 season.

Watanabe joined Gamba Osaka in August 2018 in a deal which saw Gamba forward Shun Nagasawa move in the opposite direction. He made a scoring debut for the men in blue and black with a 27th-minute strike to break the deadlock in a league match away to Vegalta Sendai. Unfortunately for him and his team-mates his goal was not enough as Sendai fought back in the second half to finish as 2–1 winners. He ended the season with three goals in 12 league appearances to help Gamba to a ninth-place finish in the final league table.

In 2021 he joined Yokohama FC on a free transfer.

== International career ==
Watanabe made his full, senior international debut for Japan on 6 January 2010 in a 2011 AFC Asian Cup qualifier against Yemen. He started the match and was replaced in the 85th minute by Kensuke Nagai as Japan came from two goals down to run out 3–2 winners.

== Career statistics ==
=== Club ===
Updated as of match played on 22 April 2021.

Club	Season	League		Emperor's Cup		J.League Cup		AFC		Other^{1}		Total	
Club	Season	Apps	Goals	Apps	Goals	Apps	Goals	Apps	Goals	Apps	Goals	Apps	Goals
Yokohama F. Marinos	2009	34	13	3	4	8	4	-		-		45	21
Yokohama F. Marinos	2010	24	8	2	0	6	1	-		-		32	9
Yokohama F. Marinos	2011	30	7	5	1	5	2	-		-		40	10
Yokohama F. Marinos	Total	88	28	10	5	19	7	-		-		117	40
FC Tokyo	2012	27	6	1	0	3	2	7	3	1	0	39	11
FC Tokyo	2013	33	17	5	1	4	1	-		-		42	19
FC Tokyo	2014	26	3	3	1	4	0	-		-		33	4
FC Tokyo	Total	86	26	9	2	11	3	7	3	1	0	114	34
Vissel Kobe	2015	28	10	4	3	8	7	-		-		40	20
Vissel Kobe	2016	33	12	2	2	7	3	-		-		42	17
Vissel Kobe	2017	34	8	5	4	7	0	-		-		46	12
Vissel Kobe	2018	19	4	2	0	5	3	-		-		26	7
Vissel Kobe	Total	114	34	13	9	27	13	-		-		154	56
Gamba Osaka	2018	12	3	0	0	0	0	-		-		12	3
Gamba Osaka	2019	18	3	1	0	7	0	-		-		26	3
Gamba Osaka	2020	33	6	2	0	2	0	-		-		37	6
Gamba Osaka	Total	63	12	3	0	9	0	-		-		75	12
Yokohama FC	2021	8	0	0	0	1	0	-		-		9	0
Yokohama FC	Total	8	0	0	0	1	0	-		-		9	0
Career total		359	100	35	16	67	23	7	3	1	0	469	142

^{1}Includes Japanese Super Cup.

=== International ===
Japan national team
Year	Apps	Goals
2010	1	0
Total	1	0

== Honours ==
=== Individual ===
- J.League Rookie of the Year : 2009
