= Ken Tajiri =

Japanese footballer

Ken Tajiri 田尻 健
Personal information
- Full name: Ken Tajiri
- Date of birth: 11 June 1993 (age 33)
- Place of birth: Minoh, Osaka, Japan
- Height: 1.82 m (6 ft 0 in)
- Position: Goalkeeper

Team information
- Current team: AC Nagano Parceiro
- Number: 1

Youth career
- 2000–2011: Gamba Osaka

Senior career*
Years	Team	Apps	(Gls)
2012−2019	Gamba Osaka	1	(0)
2014–2015	→ J.League U-22	9	(0)
2016–2019	→ Gamba Osaka U-23	30	(0)
2017–2018	→ Zweigen Kanazawa (loan)	9	(0)
2020−2022	Gainare Tottori	81	(0)
2023	Iwate Grulla Morioka	0	(0)
2024–	AC Nagano Parceiro	22	(0)
Medal record
Gamba Osaka
Winner	J1 League	2014
Runner-up	J1 League	2015
Winner	J.League Cup	2014
Runner-up	J.League Cup	2015
Runner-up	J.League Cup	2016
Winner	Emperor's Cup	2014
Winner	Emperor's Cup	2015
Runner-up	Emperor's Cup	2012
- * Club domestic league appearances and goals as of 17 August 2026

Ken Tajiri (田尻 健, Tajiri Ken) is a Japanese football player. He currently plays for AC Nagano Parceiro in J3 League. He has previously had loan spells with the J.League U-22 Selection and J2 League outfit Zweigen Kanazawa. His playing position is goalkeeper and he has spent most of his career as a backup 'keeper.

== Club career ==
Born in Minoh in the north of Osaka, Tajiri came up through Gamba Osaka's youth system and earned his first professional contract ahead of the 2012 season. He spent his first 5 years with the club as a reserve and didn't see a single minute of game time.

He finally got the chance to get on the field in 2017. After starting the season as third-choice goalkeeper, an injury to first-choice Masaaki Higashiguchi saw Tajiri make the bench for the clash at home to Urawa Red Diamonds on 19 March 2017. Starting goalkeeper Yōsuke Fujigaya got injured in the 73rd minute and Tajiri was brought on as a replacement with Gamba leading 1-0 courtesy of Yasuyuki Konno's goal earlier in the second half. Unfortunately he was unable to keep a clean sheet and Rafael Silva equalised for Urawa in the 92nd minute.

That was to be his only appearance for Gamba in 2017 and he was then loaned out to J2 side Zweigen Kanazawa for the next 18 months where he could only play 9 league games before moving back to Osaka for the 2019 season.

Tajiri played 9 games across the 2014 and 2015 seasons for the J.League U-22 Selection, a team set up to increase the number of competitors in J3 League and give young Japanese players a platform to perform ahead of the 2016 Olympic games. The following year he played 13 times for Gamba Osaka's newly formed Under-23 side in J3 League.

== Club statistics ==
As of 18 October 2026.

Appearances and goals by club, season and competition
Club	Season	League			National cup (Note: Includes Emperor's Cup)		League cup (Note: Includes J.League Cup)		Total	
Club	Season	Division	Apps	Goals	Apps	Goals	Apps	Goals	Apps	Goals
Gamba Osaka	2012	J.League Division 1	0	0	0	0	0	0	0	0
Gamba Osaka	2013	J.League Division 2	0	0	0	0	0	0	0	0
Gamba Osaka	2014	J.League Division 1	0	0	0	0	0	0	0	0
Gamba Osaka	2015	J1 League	0	0	0	0	0	0	0	0
Gamba Osaka	2016	J1 League	0	0	0	0	0	0	0	0
Gamba Osaka	2017	J1 League	1	0	0	0	0	0	1	0
Gamba Osaka	2019	J1 League	0	0	0	0	1	0	1	0
Gamba Osaka	Total		1	0	0	0	1	0	2	0
J.League U-22 Selection (loan)	2014	J3 League	4	0	–		–		4	0
J.League U-22 Selection (loan)	2015	J3 League	5	0	–		–		5	0
J.League U-22 Selection (loan)	Total		9	0	0	0	0	0	9	0
Gamba Osaka U-23 (loan)	2016	J3 League	13	0	–		–		13	0
Zweigen Kanazawa (loan)	2017	J2 League	0	0	0	0	–		0	0
Zweigen Kanazawa (loan)	2018	J2 League	9	0	1	0	–		10	0
Zweigen Kanazawa (loan)	Total		9	0	1	0	0	0	10	0
Gamba Osaka U-23 (loan)	2019	J3 League	17	0	–		–		17	0
Gainare Tottori	2020	J3 League	34	0	0	0	–		34	0
Gainare Tottori	2021	J3 League	23	0	2	0	–		25	0
Gainare Tottori	2022	J3 League	24	0	1	0	–		25	0
Gainare Tottori	Total		81	0	3	0	0	0	84	0
Iwate Grulla Morioka	2023	J3 League	0	0	0	0	–		0	0
Nagano Parceiro	2024	J3 League	7	0	0	0	1	0	8	0
Nagano Parceiro	2025	J3 League	2	0	0	0	0	0	2	0
Nagano Parceiro	2026	J2/J3 (100)	13	0	–		–		13	0
Nagano Parceiro	2026–27	J3 League	0	0	0	0	0	0	0	0
Nagano Parceiro	Total		22	0	0	0	1	0	23	0
Career total			152	0	4	0	2	0	158	0
