= Kōsuke Onose =

Japanese footballer (born 1993)

Kōsuke Onose 小野瀬 康介
Personal information
- Full name: Kōsuke Onose
- Date of birth: 22 April 1993 (age 33)
- Place of birth: Ōta, Tokyo, Japan
- Height: 1.76 m (5 ft 9 1/2 in)
- Positions: Winger; attacking midfielder

Team information
- Current team: Shonan Bellmare
- Number: 7

Youth career
- 2001–2005: Mickey SC
- 2006–2011: Yokohama FC

Senior career*
Years	Team	Apps	(Gls)
2011–2016	Yokohama FC	126	(10)
2017–2018	Renofa Yamaguchi	66	(16)
2018–2022	Gamba Osaka	128	(15)
2023–	Shonan Bellmare	81	(6)

International career
2012	Japan U-19	4	(0)
- * Club domestic league appearances and goals as of 14 August 2026

Kōsuke Onose (小野瀬 康介, born 22 April 1993) is a Japanese footballer who plays as a winger or an attacking midfielder for J2 League club Shonan Bellmare. He has previously played for Gamba Osaka, Yokohama FC and Renofa Yamaguchi.

== Club career ==
Onose came through the youth ranks at J2 League club Yokohama FC and made the first team ahead of the 2011 season. He spent a total of 6 seasons at the Mitsuzawa Stadium scoring 10 times in over 100 league games.

He switched to fellow J2 side Renofa Yamaguchi in 2017 and after netting 6 times in 41 league games he enjoyed a breakout season in 2018 scoring 10 goals in 25 matches in the first half of the year which brought him to the attention of J1 side Gamba Osaka.

Onose signed for Gamba Osaka on the last day of July 2018 and was handed the number 50 jersey. He debuted as a second-half substitute for Shu Kurata in a 3-2 loss away to Nagoya Grampus on 5 August 2018 and played a total of 14 league and 2 J.League Cup games prior to the end of the season, scoring 3 goals in the process.

In November 2022, it was announced that Onose would be joining Shonan Bellmare for the 2023 season. He scored on his debut for the club in a 5–1 league win over Sagan Tosu.

== Career statistics ==
As of 10 April 2023.

Appearances and goals by club, season and competition
Club	Season	League			Cup		League Cup		Continental		Other		Total	
Club	Season	Division	Apps	Goals	Apps	Goals	Apps	Goals	Apps	Goals	Apps	Goals	Apps	Goals
Japan			League		Emperor's Cup		League Cup		AFC		Other		Total	
Yokohama FC	2011	J2 League	3	0	0	0	-		-		-		3	0
Yokohama FC	2012	J2 League	15	2	2	0	-		-		-		17	2
Yokohama FC	2013	J2 League	19	1	1	0	-		-		-		20	1
Yokohama FC	2014	J2 League	22	1	1	0	-		-		-		23	1
Yokohama FC	2015	J2 League	37	2	1	0	-		-		-		38	2
Yokohama FC	2016	J2 League	30	4	3	0	-		-		-		33	4
Yokohama FC	Total		126	10	8	0	0	0	0	0	0	0	134	10
Renofa Yamaguchi	2017	J2 League	41	6	1	0	-		-		-		42	6
Renofa Yamaguchi	2018	J2 League	25	10	2	0	-		-		-		27	10
Renofa Yamaguchi	Total		66	16	3	0	0	0	0	0	0	0	69	16
Gamba Osaka	2018	J1 League	14	3	0	0	2	0	-		-		16	3
Gamba Osaka	2019	J1 League	30	7	2	0	7	1	-		-		39	8
Gamba Osaka	2020	J1 League	27	2	2	0	2	0	-		-		31	2
Gamba Osaka	2021	J1 League	31	0	4	1	2	0	5	0	1 (Note: Appearance in the Japanese Super Cup)	0	43	1
Gamba Osaka	2022	J1 League	26	3	1	0	2	0	-		-		29	3
Gamba Osaka	Total		128	15	9	1	15	1	5	0	1	0	158	17
Shonan Bellmare	2023	J1 League	6	2	0	0	1	0	-		-		7	2
Career Total			326	43	20	1	16	1	5	0	1	0	368	45
