= Tatsuya Yamaguchi (footballer) =

Japanese footballer

Tatsuya Yamaguchi 山口 竜弥
Personal information
- Full name: Tatsuya Yamaguchi
- Date of birth: February 9, 2000 (age 26)
- Place of birth: Yokohama, Japan
- Height: 1.71 m (5 ft 7 1/2 in)
- Position: Defender

Team information
- Current team: Tokushima Vortis
- Number: 44

Youth career
- Osone SC
- –2014: Mamedo FC
- 2015–2017: Tokai University Sagami High School

Senior career*
Years	Team	Apps	(Gls)
2018–2021	Gamba Osaka	0	(0)
2018–2021	Gamba Osaka U-23	92	(3)
2021–2022	Tokyo Verdy	19	(0)
2023–2024	Ehime FC	52	(0)
2024–	Tokushima Vortis	20	(0)
- * Club domestic league appearances and goals as of 14 August 2026

Tatsuya Yamaguchi (山口 竜弥, Yamaguchi Tatsuya; born 9 February 2000) is a Japanese footballer who plays for Tokushima Vortis from 2024. His regular playing position is as a left full-back.

== Career ==
After graduating from Tokai University Sagami High School, Yamaguchi signed for Gamba Osaka ahead of the 2018 J1 League season and was handed the number 35 jersey. He debuted for Gamba's Under-23 side in week 2 of the 2018 J3 League, coming on as a 73rd-minute substitute for Reo Takae in a 4–1 defeat away to Kagoshima United.

In total he played 31 out of 32 league games, starting in 29 of them to help his side to 6th place in the final standings. He didn't make any appearances for Gamba Osaka's senior side during his debut season, but he did make the substitutes bench on 2 occasions during the 2018 J.League Cup without making it onto the playing field.

On 1 December 2022, Yamaguchi officially transferred to the J3 club, Ehime FC from Tokyo Verdy for upcoming 2023 season.

== Career statistics ==
As of the end 2022 season.

Club performance			League		Cup		League Cup		Continental		Other		Total	
Season	Club	League	Apps	Goals	Apps	Goals	Apps	Goals	Apps	Goals	Apps	Goals	Apps	Goals
Japan			League		Emperor's Cup		League Cup		Asia				Total	
2018	Gamba Osaka	J1	0	0	0	0	0	0	-		-		0	0
2019	Gamba Osaka	J1	0	0	0	0	0	0	-		-		0	0
2020	Gamba Osaka	J1	0	0	0	0	1	0	-		-		1	0
2021	Tokyo Verdy	J2	15	0	1	0	0	0	-		-		16	0
2022	Tokyo Verdy	J2	4	0	2	0	0	0	-		-		6	0
2023	Ehime FC	J3	0	0	0	0	0	0	-		-		0	0
Career total			19	0	3	0	1	0	-		-		23	0

== Reserves performance ==
Last Updated: 16 December 2020

Club performance			League		Total	
Season	Club	League	Apps	Goals	Apps	Goals
Japan			League		Total	
2018	Gamba Osaka U-23	J3	31	0	31	0
2019	Gamba Osaka U-23	J3	29	0	29	0
2020	Gamba Osaka U-23	J3	32	3	32	3
Career total			92	3	92	3
