= Yuya Fukuda =

Japanese footballer

Yuya Fukuda 福田 湧矢
Personal information
- Full name: Yuya Fukuda
- Date of birth: April 4, 1999 (age 27)
- Place of birth: Kitakyushu, Fukuoka, Japan
- Height: 1.76 m (5 ft 9 1/2 in)
- Position: Winger

Team information
- Current team: Tokyo Verdy
- Number: 14

Youth career
- Kokura Minami FC
- 2015–2017: Higashi Fukuoka High School

Senior career*
Years	Team	Apps	(Gls)
2018–2024	Gamba Osaka	100	(6)
2018–2020	→ Gamba Osaka U-23 (loan)	34	(4)
2025–	Tokyo Verdy	42	(4)
- * Club domestic league appearances and goals as of 8 August 2026

Yuya Fukuda (福田 湧矢, Fukuda Yūya; born 4 April 1999) is a Japanese footballer who plays as a winger for J1 League club Tokyo Verdy.

His younger brother Sho is also a professional footballer currently playing for J1 League side Shonan Bellmare.

== Career ==
After graduating from Higashi Fukuoka High School, Fukuda joined Gamba Osaka ahead of the 2018 J1 League season and was handed the number 34 jersey. He made his senior debut on 24 February 2018 in a 3-2 home defeat by Nagoya Grampus in which he was substituted for Shinya Yajima in the 60th minute. In total he played 5 times in his debut season, 3 games in J1 League and 2 in the J.League Cup. He spent most of 2018 with Gamba U-23 in J3 League scoring 3 times in 22 appearances to help them to 6th place in the final standings.

In December 2024, it was announced that Fukuda would be joining Tokyo Verdy ahead of the 2025 season.

== Career statistics ==
=== Club ===
As of end of 2024 season

Appearances and goals by club, season and competition
Club	Season	League			Emperor's Cup		J. League Cup		Other		Total	
Club	Season	Division	Apps	Goals	Apps	Goals	Apps	Goals	Apps	Goals	Apps	Goals
Gamba Osaka	2018	J1 League	3	0	0	0	2	0	–		5	0
Gamba Osaka	2019	J1 League	17	1	2	0	4	0	–		23	1
Gamba Osaka	2020	J1 League	29	1	2	1	3	0	–		34	2
Gamba Osaka	2021	J1 League	14	0	0	0	0	0	2 (Note: Appearances in AFC Champions League)	0	16	0
Gamba Osaka	2022	J1 League	15	2	0	0	5	0	–		20	2
Gamba Osaka	2023	J1 League	15	1	1	0	5	2	–		21	3
Gamba Osaka	2024	J1 League	7	1	2	0	0	0	–		9	1
Gamba Osaka	Total		100	6	7	1	19	2	2	0	128	9
Gamba Osaka U-23 (loan)	2018	J3 League	22	3	–		–		–		22	3
Gamba Osaka U-23 (loan)	2019	J3 League	11	1	–		–		–		11	1
Gamba Osaka U-23 (loan)	2020	J3 League	1	0	–		–		–		1	0
Gamba Osaka U-23 (loan)	Total		34	4	0	0	0	0	0	0	34	4
Career total			134	10	7	1	19	2	2	0	162	13
