= Hayato Okuda =

Japanese footballer (born 2001)

Hayato Okuda 奥田 勇斗
Personal information
- Date of birth: 21 April 2001 (age 25)
- Place of birth: Osaka, Japan
- Height: 1.72 m (5 ft 8 in)
- Position: Defender

Team information
- Current team: Cerezo Osaka
- Number: 16

Youth career
- 2008–2013: Nagano FC
- 2014–2019: Gamba Osaka

College career
Years	Team	Apps	(Gls)
2020–2023	Momoyama Gakuin University		

Senior career*
Years	Team	Apps	(Gls)
2019	Gamba Osaka U-23	8	(1)
2023–	Cerezo Osaka	66	(1)
Medal record
Men's football
Representing Japan
Asian Games
Silver medal – second place	2022 Hangzhou	Team
- * Club domestic league appearances and goals as of 10 August 2026

Hayato Okuda (奥田 勇斗, Okuda Hayato; born 21 April 2001) is a Japanese footballer who plays as a defender for J1 League club Cerezo Osaka.

== Career ==
In April 2023, it was announced that Okuda would be joining Cerezo Osaka for the 2024 season. During the 2023 season, Okuda was a designated special player, allowing him to represent both Cerezo and Momoyama Gakuin University.

He made his debut in a 1–1 draw with FC Tokyo in a J.League Cup game, appearing as a half-time substitute for Riku Matsuda.

== International career ==
Okuda was part of the Japan squad for the 2022 Asian Games.

== Career statistics ==
=== Club ===
As of 23 July 2023.

Club	Season	League			National Cup		League Cup		Other		Total	
Club	Season	Division	Apps	Goals	Apps	Goals	Apps	Goals	Apps	Goals	Apps	Goals
Gamba Osaka U-23	2019	J3 League	8	1	0	0	0	0	0	0	8	1
Cerezo Osaka	2023	J1 League	1	0	0	0	0	0	0	0	1	0
Career total			9	1	0	0	0	0	0	0	9	1
