= Yūto Suzuki =

Japanese footballer (born 1993)

Yūto Suzuki 鈴木 雄斗
Personal information
- Full name: Yūto Suzuki
- Date of birth: December 7, 1993 (age 32)
- Place of birth: Kanagawa, Japan
- Height: 1.82 m (5 ft 11 1/2 in)
- Position: Winger

Team information
- Current team: Shonan Bellmare
- Number: 37

Youth career
- 2002–2003: Oita Trinita
- 2004–2007: Kashiwa Reysol
- 2008–2011: Yokohama F. Marinos

Senior career*
Years	Team	Apps	(Gls)
2012–2015	Mito HollyHock	95	(14)
2016–2017	Montedio Yamagata	55	(8)
2018–2020	Kawasaki Frontale	31	(2)
2019	→ Gamba Osaka (loan)	6	(0)
2019	→ Gamba Osaka U-23 (loan)	1	(0)
2020	→ Matsumoto Yamaga (loan)	42	(4)
2021–2023	Júbilo Iwata	109	(17)
2024–	Shonan Bellmare	85	(4)
Medal record
Kawasaki Frontale
Winner	J1 League	2018
Júbilo Iwata
Winner	J2 League	2022
- * Club domestic league appearances and goals as of 14 August 2026

Yūto Suzuki (鈴木 雄斗, Suzuki Yūto; born 7 December 1993) is a Japanese professional footballer who plays as a winger for J.League club Shonan Bellmare.

== Club statistics ==
As of match played 29 April 2022

Appearances and goals by club, season and competition
Club	Season	League			National cup		League cup		Continental		Total	
Club	Season	Division	Apps	Goals	Apps	Goals	Apps	Goals	Apps	Goals	Apps	Goals
Japan			League		Emperor's Cup		J. League Cup		Asia		Total	
Mito HollyHock	2012	J2 League	19	1	1	0	-		-		20	1
Mito HollyHock	2013	J2 League	21	3	1	0	-		-		22	3
Mito HollyHock	2014	J2 League	20	1	2	0	-		-		22	1
Mito HollyHock	2015	J2 League	27	6	4	3	-		-		31	9
Mito HollyHock	Total		87	11	8	3	0	0	0	0	95	14
Montedio Yamagata	2016	J2 League	21	2	2	1	-		-		23	3
Montedio Yamagata	2017	J2 League	31	5	1	0	-		-		32	5
Montedio Yamagata	Total		52	7	3	1	0	0	0	0	55	8
Kawasaki Frontale	2018	J1 League	18	1	2	0	2	0	1	1	23	2
Kawasaki Frontale	2019	J1 League	6	0	0	0	0	0	2	0	8	0
Kawasaki Frontale	Total		24	1	2	0	2	0	3	1	31	2
Gamba Osaka (loan)	2019	J1 League	3	0	1	0	2	0	-		6	0
Gamba Osaka U-23 (loan)	2019	J3 League	1	0	0	0	-		-		1	0
Matsumoto Yamaga (loan)	2020	J2 League	41	3	0	0	1	1	-		42	4
Júbilo Iwata	2021	J2 League	41	8	1	0	-		-		42	8
Júbilo Iwata	2022	J1 League	9	5	0	0	3	0	-		12	5
Júbilo Iwata	Total		50	13	1	0	3	0	0	0	54	13
Total			258	35	15	4	8	1	3	1	282	41
