= Yuto Nagao =

Japanese footballer

Personal information
- Date of birth: 31 August 2001 (age 25)
- Place of birth: Osaka, Japan
- Height: 1.78 m (5 ft 10 in)
- Position: Midfielder

Team information
- Current team: Fujieda MYFC
- Number: 66

Youth career
- Settsu FC
- Settsu Eleven JSC
- Senrioka FC
- –2019: Gamba Osaka

College career
Years	Team	Apps	(Gls)
2020–2023	Kwansei Gakuin University		

Senior career*
Years	Team	Apps	(Gls)
2019	Gamba Osaka U-23	11	(0)
2024–2026	Mito HollyHock	49	(0)
2026–	Fujieda MYFC	1	(0)
- * Club domestic league appearances and goals as of 13 August 2026

Yuto Nagao (長尾 優斗, Nagao Yuto; born 31 August 2001) is a Japanese footballer who plays for Fujieda MYFC.

== Career statistics ==
As of 10 November 2020.

Appearances and goals by club, season and competition
Club	Season	League			National Cup		League Cup		Other		Total	
Club	Season	Division	Apps	Goals	Apps	Goals	Apps	Goals	Apps	Goals	Apps	Goals
Gamba Osaka U-23	2019	J3 League	11	0	–		–		0	0	11	0
Career total			11	0	0	0	0	0	0	0	11	0
