= Riku Matsuda (footballer, born 1999) =

Japanese footballer

Riku Matsuda 松田 陸
Personal information
- Full name: Riku Matsuda
- Date of birth: May 3, 1999 (age 27)
- Place of birth: Fujioka, Gunma, Japan
- Height: 1.75 m (5 ft 9 in)
- Position: Defender

Team information
- Current team: Tokyo Verdy
- Number: 36

Youth career
- Midori SC
- –2014: Maebashi FC
- 2015–2017: Maebashi Ikuei High School

Senior career*
Years	Team	Apps	(Gls)
2018–2020	Gamba Osaka	2	(0)
2018–2020	Gamba Osaka U-23	78	(1)
2021–2023	Zweigen Kanazawa	81	(2)
2023–2025	JEF United Chiba	32	(0)
2025–	Tokyo Verdy	3	
- * Club domestic league appearances and goals as of 8 August 2026

Riku Matsuda (松田 陸, Matsuda Riku; born 3 May 1999) is a Japanese footballer who plays for Tokyo Verdy. His regular playing position is right full-back.

== Career ==
After graduating from Maebashi Ikuei High School, with whom he won the All Japan High School Soccer Tournament, Matsuda signed for Gamba Osaka ahead of the 2018 J1 League season. He debuted for Gamba's Under-23 side in week 2 of the 2018 J3 League, coming on as a 58th-minute substitute for Yuto Mori in a 4-1 defeat away to Kagoshima United.

Matsuda played a total of 24 games, including 23 starts, in his first season of senior football to help Gamba U-23 finish 6th in the final standings. He didn't feature in any of Gamba's top team's matches but was named on the substitutes bench twice, once in the J.League and once in the J.League Cup.

== Career statistics ==
Last update: 2 December 2018

Club performance			League		Cup		League Cup		Continental		Other		Total	
Season	Club	League	Apps	Goals	Apps	Goals	Apps	Goals	Apps	Goals	Apps	Goals	Apps	Goals
Japan			League		Emperor's Cup		League Cup		Asia				Total	
2018	Gamba Osaka	J1	0	0	0	0	0	0	-		-		0	0
2019	Gamba Osaka	J1	0	0	0	0	0	0	-		-		0	0
Career total			0	0	0	0	0	0	-		-		0	0

== Reserves performance ==
Last Updated: 2 December 2018

Club performance			League		Total	
Season	Club	League	Apps	Goals	Apps	Goals
Japan			League		Total	
2018	Gamba Osaka U-23	J3	24	0	24	0
2019	Gamba Osaka U-23	J3	0	0	0	0
Career total			24	0	24	0
