= Shunya Suganuma =

Japanese footballer

Shunya Suganuma 菅沼 駿哉
Personal information
- Full name: Shunya Suganuma
- Date of birth: 17 May 1990 (age 36)
- Place of birth: Toyonaka, Osaka, Japan
- Height: 1.82 m (6 ft 0 in)
- Position: Centre back

Team information
- Current team: Khon Kaen United
- Number: 13

Youth career
- 2003–2008: Gamba Osaka

Senior career*
Years	Team	Apps	(Gls)
2009–2011	Gamba Osaka	0	(0)
2011	→ Roasso Kumamoto (loan)	17	(0)
2012–2014	Júbilo Iwata	54	(2)
2015–2016	Kyoto Sanga	74	(2)
2017	Montedio Yamagata	40	(0)
2018–2021	Gamba Osaka	11	(0)
2018	→ Gamba Osaka U23 (loan)	5	(1)
2022	Machida Zelvia	19	(0)
2023	Taichung Futuro	4	(0)
2024	Khon Kaen United	14	(0)
2024	HK Rangers	8	(0)
2025–	Khon Kaen United	34	(0)
Medal record
Gamba Osaka
Runner-up	J1 League	2010
Winner	Emperor's Cup	2009
Representing Japan
Asian Games
Gold medal – first place	2010 Guangzhou	Team
- * Club domestic league appearances and goals as of 13 April 2025

Shunya Suganuma (菅沼 駿哉, Suganuma Shun'ya; born 17 May 1990) is a Japanese professional footballer who currently plays as a centre back for Thai League 2 club Khon Kaen United.

Suganuma previously had spells with Roasso Kumamoto, Júbilo Iwata, Kyoto Sanga, Montedio Yamagata and Gamba Osaka in Japan.

== Club career ==
A native of Osaka, Suganuma came through the youth team ranks at Gamba Osaka and earned his first professional contract ahead of the 2009 season. In total, he spent 3 years in the Gamba first-team squad and had only 2 AFC Champions League appearances to show for it. He was loaned out to J2 League club Roasso Kumamoto for the second half of the 2011 season and played 17 times as the men from Kyushu finished in 11th place.

Suganuma joined Júbilo Iwata in 2012 and played 21 league games in his first season which saw them finish mid-table. However, the following year he featured just 16 times as Júbilo were relegated to J2. The club would stay in Japan's second tier for just one season with Suganuma featuring 17 times as they were promoted via the playoffs.

Júbilo moved up to J1 League in 2015. However, Suganuma spent the next 3 seasons in J2, first with Kyoto Sanga before moving north to link up with Montedio Yamagata in 2017. His consistent performances once again brought him to the attention of Gamba Osaka who re-signed him in 2018.

Suganuma spent most of his first season back in Osaka on the substitutes bench as a backup to the first-choice centre-back pairing of Genta Miura and Fábio. Still, he did manage to rack up 16 appearances in total, 11 in the league and 5 in the J.League Cup, helping Gamba to finish 9th and reach the quarter-finals in those respective competitions. Additionally, he had a brief spell playing with Gamba's Under-23 side in J3 League, making 5 appearances and scoring once.

On 23 August 2024, Suganuma joined Hong Kong Premier League club HK Rangers.

== International career ==
Suganuma was a member of the Japan squad for the 2009 East Asian Games and won a gold medal with Japan under-23 in the 2010 Asian Games in Guangzhou.

== Career statistics ==
=== Club ===
Updated to 2 December 2018.

Club performance			League		Cup		League Cup		Continental		Total	
Season	Club	League	Apps	Goals	Apps	Goals	Apps	Goals	Apps	Goals	Apps	Goals
Japan			League		Emperor's Cup		League Cup		Asia		Total	
2009	Gamba Osaka	J1	0	0	0	0	0	0	0	0	0	0
2010	Gamba Osaka	J1	0	0	0	0	0	0	1	0	1	0
2011	Gamba Osaka	J1	0	0	0	0	0	0	1	0	1	0
Total			0	0	0	0	0	0	2	0	2	0
2011	Roasso Kumamoto	J2	17	0	1	0	–		–		18	0
Total			17	0	1	0	–		–		18	0
2012	Jubilo Iwata	J1	21	1	3	0	6	0	–		30	1
2013	Jubilo Iwata	J1	16	1	2	0	4	0	–		22	1
2014	Jubilo Iwata	J2	17	0	2	0	–		–		19	0
Total			54	2	7	0	10	0	–		71	2
2015	Kyoto Sanga	J2	34	1	3	0	–		–		37	1
2016	Kyoto Sanga	J2	40	1	1	0	–		–		41	1
Total			74	2	4	0	–		–		78	2
2017	Montedio Yamagata	J2	40	0	0	0	–		–		40	0
Total			40	0	0	0	–		–		40	0
2018	Gamba Osaka	J1	11	0	0	0	5	0	–		16	0
2019	Gamba Osaka	J1	0	0	0	0	0	0	-		0	0
Total			11	0	0	0	5	0	–		16	0
Career total			196	4	12	0	15	0	2	0	225	4

=== Reserves ===
Updated to 2 December 2018

Club performance			League		Total	
Season	Club	League	Apps	Goals	Apps	Goals
Japan			League		Total	
2018	Gamba Osaka U-23	J3	5	1	5	1
Career total			5	1	5	1
