= Shohei Ogushi =

Japanese footballer

Personal information
- Date of birth: 21 September 2002 (age 24)
- Place of birth: Hyogo, Japan
- Height: 1.70 m (5 ft 7 in)
- Position: Right-back

Team information
- Current team: FC Gifu
- Number: 26

Youth career
- –2020: Gamba Osaka

College career
Years	Team	Apps	(Gls)
2021–2024	Kyoto Sangyo University		

Senior career*
Years	Team	Apps	(Gls)
2019–2020	Gamba Osaka U-23	12	(0)
2024–	FC Gifu	30	(2)

International career
2018	Japan U16		
- * Club domestic league appearances and goals as of 17 August 2026

Shohei Ogushi (大串 昇平, Ogushi Shohei; born 21 September 2002) is a Japanese footballer who plays for J3 League club FC Gifu.

== Career statistics ==
=== Club ===
As of 26 September 2021.

Club	Season	League			National Cup		League Cup		Other		Total	
Club	Season	Division	Apps	Goals	Apps	Goals	Apps	Goals	Apps	Goals	Apps	Goals
Gamba Osaka U-23	2019	J3 League	12	0	–		–		0	0	12	0
Gamba Osaka U-23	2020	J3 League	0	0	–		–		0	0	0	0
Career total			12	0	0	0	0	0	0	0	12	0
