= Haruto Shirai =

Japanese footballer

Haruto Shirai 白井 陽斗
Personal information
- Full name: Haruto Shirai
- Date of birth: October 23, 1999 (age 27)
- Place of birth: Hirakata, Osaka, Japan
- Height: 1.70 m (5 ft 7 in)
- Position: Forward

Team information
- Current team: Hokkaido Consadole Sapporo
- Number: 71

Youth career
- Gotenyama FC
- –2017: Gamba Osaka

Senior career*
Years	Team	Apps	(Gls)
2017–2020	Gamba Osaka U-23	87	(12)
2018–2021	Gamba Osaka	1	(0)
2022–2023	Fagiano Okayama	22	(1)
2023–2024	FC Ryukyu	46	(13)
2024–	Hokkaido Consadole Sapporo	52	(5)
- * Club domestic league appearances and goals as of 13 August 2026

Haruto Shirai (白井 陽斗, Shirai Haruto; born October 23, 1999) is a Japanese football player who currently plays for Hokkaido Consadole Sapporo. His regular playing position is as an attacker.

== Career ==
Haruto Shirai joined J1 League club Gamba Osaka in 2018 having spent the previous season playing for Gamba U-23 in the J3 League and was handed the number 37 jersey.

He didn't feature at all for Gamba's senior team in 2018, however he played 21 times, 1 start and 20 substitute appearances, for Gamba U-23. He netted 3 goals in those 21 games adding to the 2 times he scored in 18 appearances in 2017.
