= Daisuke Takagi =

Japanese footballer

Daisuke Takagi 高木 大輔
Personal information
- Full name: Daisuke Takagi
- Date of birth: 14 October 1995 (age 31)
- Place of birth: Yokohama, Japan
- Height: 1.70 m (5 ft 7 in)
- Position: Forward

Team information
- Current team: FC Ryukyu
- Number: 89

Youth career
- Azamino SC
- –2013: Tokyo Verdy

Senior career*
Years	Team	Apps	(Gls)
2013–2018	Tokyo Verdy	99	(15)
2018	→ Renofa Yamaguchi (loan)	38	(8)
2019	Renofa Yamaguchi	26	(2)
2019–2020	Gamba Osaka U-23	25	(2)
2019	Gamba Osaka	2	(0)
2021-2024	Renofa Yamaguchi	86	(6)
2024-	FC Ryukyu	72	(8)

International career
2011	Japan U-17	2	(1)
- * Club domestic league appearances and goals as of 25 August 2026

Daisuke Takagi (高木 大輔, Takagi Daisuke; born 14 October 1995) is a Japanese footballer who plays for FC Ryukyu.

== Club career ==
He's the younger brother of Yoshiaki and Toshiyuki Takagi, who both grew up in Tokyo Verdy youth ranks. After several years in the youth ranks, he signed a full pro contract for Tokyo Verdy in April 2013.

== National team career ==
In June 2011, Takagi was elected Japan U-17 national team for 2011 U-17 World Cup. He played 2 matches and scored a goal against Argentina.

== Career statistics ==
Updated to end of 2018 season.

Appearances and goals by club, season and competition
Club	Season	League			Emperor's Cup		Total	
Club	Season	Division	Apps	Goals	Apps	Goals	Apps	Goals
Tokyo Verdy	2013	J2 League	6	0	0	0	6	0
Tokyo Verdy	2014	J2 League	15	1	0	0	15	1
Tokyo Verdy	2015	J2 League	25	7	2	2	27	9
Tokyo Verdy	2016	J2 League	29	6	2	1	31	7
Tokyo Verdy	2017	J2 League	24	1	1	0	25	1
Renofa Yamaguchi	2018	J2 League	38	8	2	2	40	10
Career total			137	23	7	5	144	28
