= Dai Tsukamoto =

Japanese footballer

Personal information
- Full name: Dai Tsukamoto
- Date of birth: 23 June 2001 (age 25)
- Place of birth: Izumi, Osaka, Japan
- Height: 1.76 m (5 ft 9 in)
- Positions: Forward; winger

Team information
- Current team: Zweigen Kanazawa
- Number: 7

Youth career
- Izumi FC
- SS Create
- –2020: Gamba Osaka

Senior career*
Years	Team	Apps	(Gls)
2019–2020	Gamba Osaka U-23	46	(8)
2020–2023	Gamba Osaka	17	(0)
2024–	Zweigen Kanazawa	12	(0)

International career^{‡}
2017	Japan U16	2	(0)
- * Club domestic league appearances and goals as of 1 January 2026 ‡ National team caps and goals as of 17:04, 17 March 2021 (UTC)

Dai Tsukamoto (塚元 大, Tsukamoto Dai; born 23 June 2001) is a Japanese footballer currently playing as a forward or a winger for Zweigen Kanazawa.

== Career statistics ==
=== Club ===
As of 1 April 2021.

Club	Season	League			National Cup		League Cup		Other		Total	
Club	Season	Division	Apps	Goals	Apps	Goals	Apps	Goals	Apps	Goals	Apps	Goals
Gamba Osaka U-23	2019	J3 League	22	5	–		–		0	0	22	5
Gamba Osaka U-23	2020	J3 League	24	3	–		–		0	0	24	3
Gamba Osaka U-23	Total		46	8	0	0	0	0	0	0	46	8
Gamba Osaka	2020	J1 League	6	0	2 (Note: Appearances in the Emperor's Cup)	0	1 (Note: Appearances in the J.League Cup)	0	0	0	9	0
Gamba Osaka	2021	J1 League	0	0	0	0	0	0	0	0	0	0
Gamba Osaka	Total		6	0	2	0	1	0	0	0	9	0
Career total			52	8	2	0	1	0	0	0	55	8
