= Shuhei Kawasaki =

Japanese footballer

Personal information
- Date of birth: 28 April 2001 (age 25)
- Place of birth: Kishiwada, Osaka, Japan
- Height: 1.68 m (5 ft 6 in)
- Positions: Forward; winger

Team information
- Current team: Nara Club
- Number: 54

Youth career
- Edith Kishiwada SC
- Hokuto FC
- SS Create
- –2020: Gamba Osaka

Senior career*
Years	Team	Apps	(Gls)
2019–2020	Gamba Osaka U-23	43	(10)
2020–2021	Gamba Osaka	18	(0)
2021–2025	Portimonense	0	(0)
2023	→ Vissel Kobe (loan)	4	(1)
2024–2025	→ Valmiera (loan)	12	(0)
2025	→ Tokyo Verdy (loan)	16	(1)
2026–	Nara Club	16	(3)
- * Club domestic league appearances and goals as of 25 August 2026

Shuhei Kawasaki (川﨑 修平, Kawasaki Shuhei; born 28 April 2001) is a Japanese professional footballer who plays as a forward or winger for Nara Club.

== Club career ==
On 18 May 2019, Kawasaki made his league debut for Gamba Osaka U23 against Kataller Toyama. On 4 November 2019, Kawasaki scored once and assisted once against SC Sagamihara, with Gamba Osaka announcing he would be promoted to the first team from the 2020 season. He won the J3 Meiji Yasuda J.League KONAMI Monthly MVP award for August 2020 after scoring 5 times and assisting three times.

Kawasaki made his league debut for Gamba Osaka against Vegalta Sendai on 9 September 2020.

On 10 September 2021, Kawasaki signed a five-year contract with Portimonense in Portugal.

On 8 January 2023, Kawasaki was announced at Vissel Kobe on a one year loan.

On 31 March 2025, Kawasaki was announced at Tokyo Verdy on a one year loan.

== Career statistics ==
=== Club ===
As of 7 July 2021.

Appearances and goals by club, season and competition
Club	Season	League			National cup		League cup		Continental		Other		Total	
Club	Season	Division	Apps	Goals	Apps	Goals	Apps	Goals	Apps	Goals	Apps	Goals	Apps	Goals
Gamba Osaka U-23	2019	J3 League	25	2	–		–		–		0	0	25	2
Gamba Osaka U-23	2020	J3 League	18	8	–		–		–		0	0	18	8
Gamba Osaka U-23	Total		43	10	0	0	0	0	0	0	0	0	43	10
Gamba Osaka	2020	J1 League	15	0	0	0	1 (Note: Appearances in the J. League Cup)	0	–		0	0	16	0
Gamba Osaka	2021	J1 League	3	0	1 (Note: Appearances in the Emperor's Cup)	0	0	0	2 (Note: Appearances in the AFC Champions League)	3	1 (Note: Appearances in the Japanese Super Cup)	0	7	3
Gamba Osaka	Total		18	0	1	0	1	0	2	3	1	0	23	3
Career total			61	10	1	0	1	0	2	3	1	0	66	13

== Honours ==
Vissel Kobe

- J1 League: 2023
