= Shinya Yajima =

Japanese footballer

Shinya Yajima 矢島 慎也
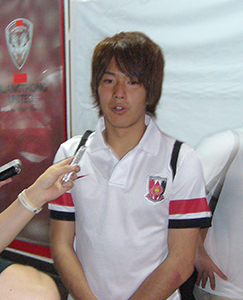
- Yajima with Urawa Red Diamonds in 2013

Personal information
- Full name: Shinya Yajima
- Date of birth: 18 January 1994 (age 32)
- Place of birth: Urawa, Saitama, Japan
- Height: 1.71 m (5 ft 7 in)
- Position: Midfielder

Team information
- Current team: Gainare Tottori
- Number: 21

Youth career
- –2005: Kitaurawa SSS
- 2006–2011: Urawa Red Diamonds

Senior career*
Years	Team	Apps	(Gls)
2012–2017	Urawa Red Diamonds	23	(2)
2014	→ J.League U-22 Selection	3	(1)
2015–2016	→ Fagiano Okayama	72	(13)
2018-2021	Gamba Osaka	82	(4)
2018	Gamba Osaka U-23	9	(0)
2018	→ Vegalta Sendai (loan)	5	(0)
2022	Omiya Ardija	38	(4)
2023	Renofa Yamaguchi	36	(3)
2024–2025	Shimizu S-Pulse	53	(6)
2026–	Gainare Tottori	16	(3)

International career
2014-16	Japan U-23	15	(3)
Medal record
Urawa Reds
Winner	AFC Champions League	2017
Runner-up	J1 League	2014
Runner-up	J.League Cup	2011
Runner-up	J.League Cup	2013
Vegalta Sendai
Runner-up	Emperor's Cup	2018
Representing Japan
AFC U-23 Championship
Gold medal – first place	2016 Qatar
- * Club domestic league appearances and goals as of 21:42, 4 June 2026 (UTC)

Shinya Yajima (矢島 慎也; born 18 January 1994) is a Japanese footballer who plays as a midfielder for J3 League club Gainare Tottori. He has previously played for both Urawa Red Diamonds and Fagiano Okayama.

== Club career ==
Born and raised in the Urawa area of Saitama, Yajima came through the ranks with his local team Urawa Red Diamonds and joined their first team ahead of the 2012 season aged just 18. He made just a solitary appearance in the Emperor's Cup during his debut season as a professional, but the following year he earned more game time; playing 8 times in the league and 6 in the domestic cups where he found the back of the net 3 times. The next 2 seasons with Urawa saw him struggle to get on the pitch and he appeared just 7 and 6 times respectively in all competitions.

Owing to a lack of game time, Yajima was sent on a 2-season loan to J2 League side Fagiano Okayama in 2015. He immediately became a regular in their midfield and played 37 league games in both of his seasons with Okayama scoring 13 times in total as they finished 11th and 6th in the final standings.

After gaining good top-team experience in J2 it was back to Urawa for 2017 and although he featured more than he had done prior to moving to Okayama, he was still rather a peripheral figure at the Saitama Stadium. He made just 11 appearances in the league and 19 in total, including 4 in Urawa's victorious AFC Champions League campaign.

Yajima moved from Urawa to their fierce rivals Gamba Osaka ahead of the 2018 season. However, he was not flavour of the month with new Brazilian coach Levir Culpi and played a mere 2 league and 2 league cup games in his first year in Osaka. Out of favour, he found himself featuring as an overage player for Gamba Under-23 in J3 League under the leadership of Tsuneyasu Miyamoto. He played 9 times in J3 before being loaned to J1 side Vegalta Sendai at the end of June.

Game time was again hard to come by in Sendai and he played just 5 league games and 3 Emperor's Cup games as Vegalta finished runners up to his former club, Urawa. Tsuneyasu Miyamoto replaced Levir Culpi midway through the 2018 season with Gamba facing the real prospect of relegation to J2, he steadied the ship and was appointed as head coach permanently ahead of the 2019 campaign. Having worked with Yajima previously at Gamba Under-23, he recalled him to first team squad ahead of his first full season in charge at the Panasonic Stadium.

== National team career ==
In August 2016, Yajima was selected in the Japan Under-23 national team squad for the 2016 Summer Olympics. At this tournament, he played all 3 matches and scored a goal against Sweden.

== Club statistics ==
Updated to 10 December 2018.

Club	Season	League		Cup^{1}		League Cup^{2}		AFC		Other^{3}		Total	
Club	Season	Apps	Goals	Apps	Goals	Apps	Goals	Apps	Goals	Apps	Goals	Apps	Goals
Urawa Red Diamonds	2011	0	0	1	0	0	0	–		–		1	0
Urawa Red Diamonds	2012	8	0	1	1	5	2	0	0	–		14	3
Urawa Red Diamonds	2013	4	1	1	0	1	0	1	0	–		7	1
Urawa Red Diamonds	2014	0	0	1	0	5	1	0	0	–		6	1
Urawa Red Diamonds	2017	11	1	1	0	2	0	4	0	1	0	19	1
Total		23	2	5	1	13	3	5	0	1	0	47	6
Fagiano Okayama	2015	37	8	1	0	–		–		–		38	8
Fagiano Okayama	2016	37	5	3	0	–		–		2	0	42	5
Total		74	13	4	0	–		–		2	0	80	13
Gamba Osaka	2018	2	0	0	0	2	0	–		–		4	0
Gamba Osaka	2019	0	0	0	0	0	0	-		-		0	0
Total		2	0	0	0	2	0	–		–		4	0
Vegalta Sendai	2018	5	0	3	1	0	0	–		–		8	1
Total		5	0	3	1	0	0	–		–		8	1
Career Total		104	15	12	2	15	3	5	0	3	0	139	20

^{1}Includes Emperor's Cup.

^{2}Includes J. League Cup.

^{3}Includes Japanese Super Cup, J2 playoffs and FIFA Club World Cup.

Reserves performance

Club performance			League		Total	
Season	Club	League	Apps	Goals	Apps	Goals
Japan			League		Total	
2014	J.League U-22 Selection	J3	3	1	3	1
2018	Gamba Osaka U-23	J3	9	0	9	0
Career total			12	1	12	1

== Honours ==
=== International ===
Last Updated: 7 February 2019

Japan U-23

- AFC U-23 Championship: 2016

=== Club ===
Urawa Red Diamonds

- AFC Champions League: 2017
