= 2013 Gamba Osaka season =

Gamba Osaka
2013 season
- Chairman: Teruhisa Noro
- Manager: Kenta Hasegawa
- J.League 2: 1st
- Emperor's Cup: 3rd round
- Top goalscorer: League: Takashi Usami 19; All: Takashi Usami 20
- Highest home attendance: 18,193 vs Vissel Kobe, 20 July 2013 (J2 League)
- Lowest home attendance: 2,489 vs F.C. Imabari, 8 September 2013 (Emperor's Cup)
- Average home league attendance: 12,286

The 2013 Gamba Osaka season saw Gamba Osaka compete in J. League Division 2 following their shock relegation the previous year. As such they did not compete in the 2013 J. League Cup, but did participate in the 2013 Emperor's Cup in addition to their 2013 J. League Division 2 fixtures.

Maintaining the bulk of the previous season's squad including Japanese internationals, captain Endō and defenders Akira Kaji and Yasuyuki Konno, Gamba were able to make their stay in J. League 2 a short one and were crowned champions in November 2013 following a season long title race with neighbours Vissel Kobe who had also been relegated along with Gamba the previous year.

Takashi Usami returned to the club in mid-season following a loan-spell in Germany and his goals as well as those from Brazilians Leandro and Adi Rocha saw Gamba finish the season with 87 points and 99 goals to their credit.

== J.League 2 Results ==
Round	Date	Opponents	H / A	Result F–A	Scorers	Attendance
1	3 March 2013	Kyoto Sanga F.C.	H	3–3	Abe 60', Leandro (pen.) 62', Endō (pen.) 90'+3	18,041
2	10 March 2013	V-Varen Nagasaki	A	3–1	Hirai 13', 24' Futagawa 35'	18,153
3	17 March 2013	Yokohama F.C.	H	0–0		13,476
4	20 March 2013	Roasso Kumamoto	A	2–2	Leandro 21', Takei 39'	11,874
5	24 March 2013	JEF United	H	1–1	Kurata 27'	11,117
6	31 March 2013	Consadole Sapporo	A	3–1	Leandro 43', Ienaga 59', Iwashita 81'	17,020
7	7 April 2013	Tokyo Verdy	H	0–0		10,010
8	14 April 2013	Montedio Yamagata	A	1–0	Iwashita 21'	17,223
9	17 April 2013	Matsumoto Yamaga FC	H	1–0	Lio (o.g.) 4'	8,993
10	21 April 2013	Kataller Toyama	A	4–0	Leandro 2', 26', (pen.) 69', Kurata 74'	13,639
11	28 April 2013	Gainare Tottori	H	1–1	Leandro 75'	16,803
12	3 May 2013	F.C. Gifu	H	2–0	Abe 23', Hirai 89'	12,729
13	6 May 2013	Vissel Kobe	A	0–2		23,012
14	12 May 2013	Avispa Fukuoka	A	3–2	Leandro 40', 44', Kurata 59'	14,526
15	19 May 2013	Thespakusatsu Gunma	H	5–1	Paulinho 3', 60, Kurata 27', 61', Leandro 40'	8,045
16	26 May 2013	Ehime FC	A	2–1	Konno 62', Endō 81'	10,381
17	1 June 2013	Tochigi SC	H	3–0	Leandro 10', 44', Fujiharu 24'	12,633
18	8 June 2013	Giravanz Kitakyushu	A	1–0	Kurata 5'	7,207
19	15 June 2013	Mito HollyHock	A	2–0	Leandro 10', Okazaki 87'	10,025
20	22 June 2013	Fagiano Okayama	H	1–1	Kurata 40'	15,151
21	29 June 2013	Tokushima Vortis	H	2–0	Paulinho 32', Hirai 38'	13,708
22	3 July 2013	F.C. Gifu	A	8–2	Paulinho 2', 58' Futagawa 8', 27', Abe 45'+2, Konno 51', 63', Kawanishi 69'	11,719
23	7 July 2013	JEF United	A	0–3		15,982
24	14 July 2013	Giravanz Kitakyushu	H	1–1	Okazaki 37'	9,425
25	20 July 2013	Vissel Kobe	H	3–2	Usami 8', 39', Endō 54'	18,193
26	27 July 2013	Tokyo Verdy	A	3–3	Adi Rocha 55', Paulinho 64', Endō 73'	18,705
27	4 August 2013	Fagiano Okayama	A	3–2	Usami 43', Adi Rocha 55', 58'	18,269
28	11 August 2013	Avispa Fukuoka	H	1–0	Adi Rocha 16'	13,440
29	18 August 2013	Consadole Sapporo	H	3–0	Nishino 53', Usami 56', Adi Rocha 76'	12,449
30	21 August 2013	Gainare Tottori	A	7–1	Usami 29', 32', Adi Rocha 40', 52', Uchida 59', Nishino 66', Fujiharu 72'	10,096
31	25 August 2013	Yokohama F.C.	A	2–2	Usami 29', Fujiharu 67'	12,490
32	1 September 2013	V-Varen Nagasaki	H	1–2	Fujiharu 59'	9,895
33	15 September 2013	Mito HollyHock	H	5–0	Usami 19', 79', Abe 49', Kawanishi 67', Futagawa 83'	6,559
34	22 September 2013	Matsumoto Yamaga FC	A	2–2	Adi Rocha 15', 39'	17,148
35	29 September 2013	Ehime FC	H	0–1		12,671
36	6 October 2013	Tochigi SC	A	2–4	Usami 33', Abe 67'	10,687
37	20 October 2013	Kataller Toyama	H	3–1	Kurata 30', Nishino 44', Usami 66'	9,286
38	27 October 2013	Tokushima Vortis	A	5–1	Usami 22', 32', 84', 89', Niwa 73'	8,897
39	3 November 2013	Roasso Kumamoto	H	4–0	Endō 8', Niwa 11', Usami 41', Sato 86'	11,402
40	10 November 2013	Kyoto Sanga F.C.	A	2–0	Konno 27', Omori 86'	15,380
41	17 November 2013	Montedio Yamagata	H	3–2	Usami 15', 68', Nakamura (o.g.) 22'	13,970
42	24 November 2013	Thespakusatsu Gunma	A	1–1	Usami 54'	7,810

=== Final standings ===
Pos	Team	Pld	W	D	L	GF	GA	GD	Pts	Promotion or relegation
1	Gamba Osaka (C, P)	42	25	12	5	99	46	+53	87	Promotion to 2014 J.League Division 1
2	Vissel Kobe (P)	42	25	8	9	78	41	+37	83	Promotion to 2014 J.League Division 1
3	Kyoto Sanga	42	20	10	12	68	46	+22	70	Qualification for Promotion Playoffs (Note: Only teams that meet J1 criteria can participate in promotion playoffs. If one or more teams fail to meet the criteria, only eligible teams that finished 3rd to 6th participate and no replacement teams are added.)
4	Tokushima Vortis (O, P)	42	20	7	15	56	51	+5	67	Qualification for Promotion Playoffs
5	JEF United Chiba	42	18	12	12	68	49	+19	66	Qualification for Promotion Playoffs

Updated to match(es) played on 8 December 2013. Source: J.League Division 2
Rules for classification: 1) points; 2) goal difference; 3) number of goals scored.
(C) Champions; (O) Play-off winners; (P) Promoted

=== Match Day Line-Ups ===
The following players appeared for Gamba Osaka during 2013 J. League 2:

Player Appearances – 2013 J. League Division 2
Round	Opponent	GK	RB	LB	CB	CB	RM	LM	CM	CM	FW	FW	Substituted on	Substituted on	Substituted on
1	Kyoto Sanga F.C.	Fujigaya	Konno	Fujiharu	Niwa	Iwashita	Abe (substituted off)	Ienaga (substituted off)	Endō	Myojin	Leandro	Kurata (substituted off)	Futagawa	Paulinho	Hirai
2	V-Varen Nagasaki	Fujigaya	Konno	Fujiharu	Niwa	Iwashita	Abe	Futagawa (substituted off)	Endō	Myojin	Hirai (substituted off)	Kurata	Paulinho	Takei	
3	Yokohama F.C.	Fujigaya	Niwa (substituted off)	Fujiharu	Nishino	Iwashita	Abe	Futagawa (substituted off)	Endō	Konno	Leandro (substituted off)	Kurata	Paulinho	Hirai	Kaji
4	Roasso Kumamoto	Fujigaya	Kaji	Fujiharu	Nishino	Iwashita	Abe	Ienaga	Takei (substituted off)	Myojin	Leandro	Kurata (substituted off)	Futagawa	Kawanishi	
5	JEF United	Fujigaya	Kaji	Fujiharu	Nishino	Iwashita	Abe (substituted off)	Futagawa (substituted off)	Takei	Myojin	Leandro	Kurata (substituted off)	Paulinho	Okazaki	Ienaga
6	Consadole Sapporo	Fujigaya	Kaji	Fujiharu	Nishino	Iwashita	Ienaga	Futagawa (substituted off)	Endō	Konno	Leandro	Kurata (substituted off)	Abe	Okazaki	
7	Tokyo Verdy	Fujigaya	Kaji	Fujiharu	Nishino	Iwashita	Ienaga	Futagawa (substituted off)	Endō	Konno	Leandro	Kurata (substituted off)	Paulinho	Abe	
8	Montedio Yamagata	Fujigaya	Kaji	Fujiharu	Nishino	Iwashita	Ienaga	Futagawa (substituted off)	Endō	Konno	Leandro (substituted off)	Kurata	Abe	Hirai (substituted off)	Uchida
9	Matsumoto Yamaga FC	Fujigaya	Kaji	Fujiharu	Nishino	Iwashita	Ienaga (substituted off)	Futagawa (substituted off)	Endō	Uchida	Leandro	Kurata	Paulinho (substituted off)	Abe	Kawanishi
10	Kataller Toyama	Fujigaya	Kaji	Fujiharu	Nishino	Iwashita	Ienaga	Futagawa (substituted off)	Endō	Konno	Leandro (substituted off)	Kurata (substituted off)	Abe	Kawanishi	Uchida
11	Gainare Tottori	Fujigaya	Kaji	Fujiharu	Niwa	Iwashita (substituted off)	Ienaga (substituted off)	Futagawa (substituted off)	Endō	Konno	Leandro	Kurata	Abe	Kawanishi	Uchida
12	F.C. Gifu	Fujigaya	Kaji	Fujiharu	Nishino	Konno	Abe (substituted off)	Ienaga (substituted off)	Endō	Uchida	Leandro (substituted off)	Kurata	Futagawa	Hirai	Okazaki
13	Vissel Kobe	Fujigaya	Kaji (substituted off)	Fujiharu	Nishino	Konno	Abe (substituted off)	Ienaga (substituted off)	Endō	Uchida	Leandro	Kurata	Oh	Futagawa	Hirai
14	Avispa Fukuoka	Fujigaya	Kaji	Fujiharu	Nishino	Konno	Futagawa (substituted off)	Kurata	Endō	Uchida	Leandro (substituted off)	Paulinho (substituted off)	Abe	Myojin	Ienaga
15	Thespakusatsu Gunma	Fujigaya	Kaji	Fujiharu	Nishino	Konno	Futagawa (substituted off)	Kurata	Endō	Uchida (substituted off)	Leandro (substituted off)	Paulinho	Abe	Myojin	Kawanishi
16	Ehime FC	Fujigaya	Kaji	Fujiharu	Nishino	Konno	Futagawa (substituted off)	Kurata	Endō	Uchida	Leandro (substituted off)	Paulinho (substituted off)	Abe	Myojin	Ienaga
17	Tochigi SC	Fujigaya	Kaji	Fujiharu	Nishino	Niwa	Ienaga (substituted off)	Futagawa (substituted off)	Okazaki (substituted off)	Uchida	Leandro	Kurata	Paulinho	Myojin	Takei
18	Giravanz Kitakyushu	Fujigaya	Kaji	Fujiharu	Nishino	Niwa	Ienaga	Futagawa (substituted off)	Okazaki (substituted off)	Uchida	Leandro (substituted off)	Kurata	Abe	Myojin	Kawanishi
19	Mito HollyHock	Fujigaya	Kaji	Fujiharu	Nishino	Niwa	Ienaga (substituted off)	Futagawa (substituted off)	Myojin	Uchida	Leandro (substituted off)	Kurata	Oh	Paulinho	Okazaki
20	Fagiano Okayama	Fujigaya	Kaji	Fujiharu	Nishino	Niwa	Futagawa (substituted off)	Kurata	Myojin (substituted off)	Uchida	Leandro	Paulinho (substituted off)	Abe	Okazaki	Ienaga
21	Tokushima Vortis	Fujigaya	Kaji	Fujiharu	Niwa	Iwashita	Futagawa (substituted off)	Kurata (substituted off)	Myojin	Uchida	Hirai (substituted off)	Paulinho	Abe	Kawanishi	Okazaki
22	F.C. Gifu	Fujigaya	Oh	Fujiharu	Niwa	Nishino	Abe	Futagawa	Endō (substituted off)	Konno	Hirai (substituted off)	Paulinho (substituted off)	Myojin	Kawanishi	Omori
23	JEF United	Fujigaya	Kaji	Fujiharu	Niwa	Iwashita	Abe (substituted off)	Futagawa (substituted off)	Endō	Konno	Hirai (substituted off)	Paulinho	Kawanishi	Omori	Uchida
24	Giravanz Kitakyushu	Fujigaya	Oh (substituted off)	Fujiharu	Niwa	Iwashita	Abe	Okazaki (substituted off)	Endō	Konno	Hirai (substituted off)	Paulinho	Futagawa	Kawanishi	Hoshihara
25	Vissel Kobe	Fujigaya	Kaji	Fujiharu	Niwa	Iwashita	Omori (substituted off)	Futagawa (substituted off)	Myojin	Konno	Endō	Usami (substituted off)	Abe	Okazaki	Uchida
26	Tokyo Verdy	Fujigaya	Kaji	Fujiharu	Niwa	Iwashita (substituted off)	Omori	Okazaki (substituted off)	Myojin	Konno	Endō	Usami	Adi	Paulinho (substituted off)	Uchida
27	Fagiano Okayama	Fujigaya	Kaji	Fujiharu	Nishino (substituted off)	Konno	Omori (substituted off)	Futagawa (substituted off)	Endō	Myojin	Adi	Usami	Niwa	Okazaki	Uchida
28	Avispa Fukuoka	Fujigaya	Kaji	Fujiharu	Nishino	Konno	Omori (substituted off)	Endō	Myojin	Uchida	Adi (substituted off)	Usami (substituted off)	Hirai	Takei	Okazaki
29	Consadole Sapporo	Fujigaya	Kaji	Fujiharu	Nishino	Konno	Omori	Okazaki (substituted off)	Endō	Uchida	Adi (substituted off)	Usami (substituted off)	Futagawa	Hirai	Myojin
30	Gainare Tottori	Fujigaya	Kaji	Fujiharu	Nishino	Konno	Omori (substituted off)	Okazaki	Endō	Uchida	Adi (substituted off)	Usami (substituted off)	Oh	Hirai	Myojin
31	Yokohama F.C.	Fujigaya	Kaji	Fujiharu	Nishino	Konno	Omori (substituted off)	Endō	Myojin	Uchida	Adi (substituted off)	Usami (substituted off)	Abe	Hirai	Okazaki
32	V-Varen Nagasaki	Fujigaya	Kaji	Fujiharu	Nishino	Konno	Omori (substituted off)	Okazaki (substituted off)	Endō	Uchida	Adi (substituted off)	Usami	Futagawa	Paulinho	Hirai
33	Mito HollyHock	Fujigaya	Kaji (substituted off)	Fujiharu	Niwa	Konno	Abe	Futagawa	Endō	Uchida	Adi (substituted off)	Usami	Kawanishi	Hoshihara	
34	Matsumoto Yamaga FC	Fujigaya	Kaji	Fujiharu	Niwa	Konno	Abe (substituted off)	Futagawa (substituted off)	Endō	Uchida	Adi	Usami (substituted off)	Paulinho	Kawanishi	Okazaki
35	Ehime FC	Fujigaya	Kaji	Fujiharu	Niwa	Konno	Abe	Okazaki (substituted off)	Endō	Uchida (substituted off)	Adi (substituted off)	Usami	Hirai	Kawanishi	Omori
36	Tochigi SC	Fujigaya	Kaji	Fujiharu	Niwa	Konno	Omori	Kurata (substituted off)	Endō	Uchida (substituted off)	Kawanishi (substituted off)	Usami	Adi	Abe	Okazaki
37	Kataller Toyama	Fujigaya	Kaji	Fujiharu	Niwa	Nishino	Omori	Endō	Konno	Uchida	Kurata (substituted off)	Usami (substituted off)	Futagawa	Hirai	
38	Tokushima Vortis	Fujigaya	Kaji	Fujiharu	Niwa	Nishino	Omori (substituted off)	Endō	Konno	Uchida	Kurata (substituted off)	Usami (substituted off)	Adi	Futagawa	Sato
39	Roasso Kumamoto	Fujigaya	Kaji	Fujiharu	Niwa	Nishino	Futagawa (substituted off)	Endō	Konno	Uchida	Kurata	Usami (substituted off)	Abe	Sato	
40	Kyoto Sanga F.C.	Fujigaya	Kaji	Fujiharu	Niwa	Nishino	Futagawa (substituted off)	Endō	Konno	Uchida	Kurata	Usami (substituted off)	Omori	Sato	
41	Montedio Yamagata	Fujigaya	Kaji	Fujiharu	Niwa	Nishino	Futagawa (substituted off)	Kurata	Okazaki (substituted off)	Uchida	Sato (substituted off)	Usami	Adi	Omori	Takei
42	Thespakusatsu Gunma	Fujigaya	Kaji	Fujiharu	Niwa	Iwashita	Abe (substituted off)	Futagawa (substituted off)	Takei	Uchida (substituted off)	Kurata	Usami	Kawanishi	Sato	Okazaki

(substituted on) = Substitute on, (substituted off) = Substitute Off, = Number of goals scored, = Yellow Card and = Red Card.

== Emperor's Cup Results ==
Round	Date	Opponents	H / A	Result F–A	Scorers	Attendance
2	8 September 2013	F.C. Imabari	H	5–0	Hirai 43', Adi Rocha 66', 67', Niwa 86', Usami 89'	2,489
3	13 October 2013	Omiya Ardija	A	0–0 (3–4 on penalties)		5,254

=== Match Day Line-Ups ===
Player Appearances – 2013 Emperor's Cup
Round	Opponent	GK	RB	LB	CB	CB	RM	LM	CM	CM	FW	FW	Substituted on	Substituted on	Substituted on
2	F.C. Imabari	Fujigaya	Kaji	Fujiharu	Niwa	Nishino	Abe (substituted off)	Futagawa	Myojin (substituted off)	Uchida	Hirai (substituted off)	Usami	Adi	Omori	Okazaki
3	Omiya Ardija	Fujigaya	Kaji	Fujiharu	Niwa	Nishino	Omori	Kurata	Takei	Uchida	Hirai	Usami	Futagawa	Abe	Kawanishi

(substituted on) = Substitute on, (substituted off) = Substitute Off, = Number of goals scored, = Yellow Card and = Red Card.

== Squad statistics ==
No.	Pos.	Name	League		Emperor's Cup		Total		Discipline	
No.	Pos.	Name	Apps	Goals	Apps	Goals	Apps	Goals	Yellow card	Red card
1	GK	(Japan) Yōsuke Fujigaya	42	0	2	0	44	0	2	0
2	DF	(South Korea) Oh Jae-suk	2(3)	0	0	0	2(3)	0	0	0
4	DF	(Japan) Hiroki Fujiharu	42	4	2	0	44	4	2	0
5	DF	(Japan) Daiki Niwa	24(1)	2	2	1	26(1)	3	2	0
6	MF	(Japan) Shu Kurata	28	8	1	0	29	8	3	0
7	MF	(Japan) Yasuhito Endō (c)	33	5	0	0	33	5	3	0
8	DF	(Japan) Keisuke Iwashita	17	2	0	0	17	2	2	0
9	FW	(Brazil) Leandro	19	13	0	0	19	13	4	0
9	FW	(Brazil) Adi Rocha	9(4)	9	1	2	10(4)	11	0	0
10	MF	(Japan) Takahiro Futagawa	27(9)	4	1(1)	0	28(10)	4	0	0
11	FW	(Brazil) Paulinho	8(11)	6	0	0	8(11)	6	1	0
13	MF	(Japan) Hiroyuki Abe	14(16)	5	1(1)	0	15(17)	5	1	0
14	FW	(Japan) Shoki Hirai	5(12)	4	2	1	7(12)	5	0	0
15	MF	(Japan) Yasuyuki Konno	32	4	0	0	32	4	2	0
17	MF	(Japan) Tomokazu Myojin	12(8)	0	1	0	13(8)	0	1	0
18	FW	(Japan) Shota Kawanishi	1(14)	2	0(1)	0	1(15)	2	2	0
19	MF	(Japan) Kotaro Omori	11(5)	1	1(1)	0	12(6)	1	3	0
20	FW	(Japan) Akihiro Sato	1(4)	1	0	0	1(4)	1	1	0
21	DF	(Japan) Akira Kaji	37(1)	0	2	0	39(1)	0	6	0
23	MF	(Japan) Takuya Takei	3(4)	1	1	0	4(4)	1	0	0
24	DF	(Japan) Kenta Hoshihara	0(2)	0	0	0	0(2)	0	0	0
25	MF	(Japan) Kenya Okazaki	9(13)	2	0(1)	0	9(14)	2	1	0
26	DF	(Japan) Takaharu Nishino	29	3	2	0	31	3	4	0
27	MF	(Japan) Tatsuya Uchida	26(7)	1	2	0	28(7)	1	3	0
28	DF	(Japan) Katsuhisa Inamori	0	0	0	0	0	0	0	0
29	GK	(Japan) Atsushi Kimura	0	0	0	0	0	0	0	0
31	GK	(Japan) Ken Tajiri	0	0	0	0	0	0	0	0
33	DF	(Japan) Keigo Numata	0	0	0	0	0	0	0	0
39	FW	(Japan) Takashi Usami	18	19	2	1	20	20	1	0
41	MF	(Japan) Akihiro Ienaga	13(4)	1	0	0	13(4)	1	3	0
—	—	Own goals	–	2	–	0	–	2	–	–

Statistics accurate as of end of 2013 season.
