= 2011 Gamba Osaka season =

Gamba Osaka
2011 season
- Manager: Akira Nishino
- J.League Division 1: 3rd
- Emperor's Cup: Third round
- J.League Cup: Semi-finals
- AFC Champions League: Round of 16
Home colours	Away colours

The 2011 Gamba Osaka season was Gamba Osaka's 19th season in the J.League Division 1 and 25th overall in the Japanese top flight. It also includes the 2011 J.League Cup, 2011 Emperor's Cup, and the 2011 AFC Champions League.

== Players ==
No.	Name	GP (J1)	GS (J1)
1	Yosuke Fujigaya	34	0
29	Atsushi Kimura	0	0
2	Sota Nakazawa	27	5
3	Jung-Ya Kim	2	0
4	Kazumichi Takagi	8	1
5	Satoshi Yamaguchi	30	2
6	Takumi Shimohira	21	1
15	Hiroki Fujiharu	9	1
21	Akira Kaji	28	0
28	Shunya Suganuma	0	0
30	Tatsuya Uchida	3	0
7	Yasuhito Endō	31	4
8	Hayato Sasaki	3	1
10	Takahiro Futagawa	28	5
11	Takashi Usami	13	4
13	Seung-Yong Kim	14	4
17	Tomokazu Myojin	25	2
23	Takuya Takei	30	2
25	Shigeru Yokotani	1	0
27	Hideo Hashimoto	1	0
31	Kotaro Omori	0	0
9	Adriano	8	9
9	Rafinha	15	11
14	Shoki Hirai	11	5
16	Shohei Otsuka	0	1
18	Shota Kawanishi	1	4
22	Keun-Ho Lee	31	15
24	Kenta Hoshihara	0	0
33	Afonso	0	0

== Competitions ==
=== J.League ===
==== Table ====
Pos	Team	Pld	W	D	L	GF	GA	GD	Pts	Qualification or relegation
1	Kashiwa Reysol (C)	34	23	3	8	65	42	+23	72	Qualification for 2012 AFC Champions League group stage (Note: League champions also qualified for the 2011 FIFA Club World Cup play-off stage.; The winners of the 2011 Emperor's Cup, FC Tokyo, which played in the 2011 J.League Division 2, also qualified for the group stage of the 2012 AFC Champions League.)
2	Nagoya Grampus	34	21	8	5	67	36	+31	71	Qualification for 2012 AFC Champions League group stage
3	Gamba Osaka	34	21	7	6	78	51	+27	70	Qualification for 2012 AFC Champions League group stage
4	Vegalta Sendai	34	14	14	6	39	25	+14	56	
5	Yokohama F. Marinos	34	16	8	10	46	40	+6	56	

Updated to match(es) played on December 3, 2011. Source: J.League Division 1
Rules for classification: 1st points; 2nd goal differential; 3rd goals scored; 4th head-to-head results; 5th disciplinary points; 6th draw. If two clubs are tied for first place, both clubs will be declared.
(C) Champions

==== Matches ====
5 March 2011 Round 1	Gamba Osaka	2–1	Cerezo Osaka	Expo '70 Commemorative Stadium
Saturday 14:00	Adriano 65', Endō 76'	Report	73' Kurata	Attendance: 20,055; Referee: Masaaki Iemoto

2 July 2011 Round 2	Urawa Red Diamonds	1–1	Gamba Osaka
Saturday 18:03

10 July 2011 Round 3	Omiya Ardija	2–3	Gamba Osaka
Sunday 19:03

13 July 2011 Round 4	Gamba Osaka	3–2	Vissel Kobe
Wednesday 19:03

16 July 2011 Round 5	Ventforet Kofu	4–3	Gamba Osaka
Saturday 18:34

23 July 2011 Round 6	Gamba Osaka	2–2	Júbilo Iwata
Saturday 19:03

24 April 2011 Round 7	Sanfrecce Hiroshima	4–1	Gamba Osaka
Sunday 13:05

29 April 2011 Round 8	Gamba Osaka	3–2	Montedio Yamagata
Friday 18:03

17 August 2011 Round 9	Gamba Osaka	2–2	Nagoya Grampus
Wednesday 19:03

27 July 2011 Round 10	Kashima Antlers	1–4	Gamba Osaka
Wednesday 19:04

15 May 2011 Round 11	Avispa Fukuoka	2–3	Gamba Osaka
Sunday 15:03

21 May 2011 Round 12	Gamba Osaka	2–1	Albirex Niigata
Saturday 19:04

29 May 2011 Round 13	Kawasaki Frontale	2–1	Gamba Osaka
Sunday 16:03

11 June 2011 Round 14	Gamba Osaka	2–2	Shimizu S-Pulse
Saturday 19:04

15 June 2011 Round 15	Vegalta Sendai	2–1	Gamba Osaka
Wednesday 14:03

18 June 2011 Round 16	Gamba Osaka	2–1	Yokohama F. Marinos
Saturday 18:03

22 June 2011 Round 17	Kashiwa Reysol	2–4	Gamba Osaka
Wednesday 19:05

26 June 2011 Round 18	Gamba Osaka	5–3	Sanfrecce Hiroshima
Sunday 18:03

30 July 2011 Round 19	Júbilo Iwata	1–2	Gamba Osaka
Saturday 19:04

7 August 2011 Round 20	Gamba Osaka	2–0	Avispa Fukuoka
Sunday 18:03

13 August 2011 Round 21	Cerezo Osaka	1–1	Gamba Osaka
Saturday 19:04

20 August 2011 Round 22	Gamba Osaka	6–3	Kawasaki Frontale
Saturday 18:03

24 August 2011 Round 23	Gamba Osaka	2–0	Kashiwa Reysol
Wednesday 19:04

28 August 2011 Round 24	Vissel Kobe	0–4	Gamba Osaka
Sunday 18:04

10 September 2011 Round 25	Gamba Osaka	2–0	Omiya Ardija
Saturday 19:04

18 September 2011 Round 26	Yokohama F. Marinos	1–1	Gamba Osaka
Sunday 18:03

24 September 2011 Round 27	Gamba Osaka	0–2	Ventforet Kofu
Saturday 18:03

2 October 2011 Round 28	Gamba Osaka	1–0	Urawa Red Diamonds
Sunday 17:04

15 October 2011 Round 29	Nagoya Grampus	4–1	Gamba Osaka
Saturday 16:04

22 October 2011 Round 30	Montedio Yamagata	0–5	Gamba Osaka
Saturday 14:04

3 November 2011 Round 31	Gamba Osaka	1–0	Kashima Antlers
Thursday 14:04

19 November 2011 Round 32	Albirex Niigata	2–2	Gamba Osaka
Saturday 14:04

26 November 2011 Round 33	Gamba Osaka	1–0	Vegalta Sendai
Saturday 14:04

3 December 2011 Round 34	Shimizu S-Pulse	1–3	Gamba Osaka
Saturday 15:33

==== Results by round ====
Round	1	2	3	4	5	6	7	8	9	10	11	12	13	14	15	16	17	18	19	20	21	22	23	24	25	26	27	28	29	30	31	32	33	34
Ground	H	A	A	H	A	H	A	H	H	A	A	H	A	H	A	H	A	H	A	H	A	H	H	A	H	A	H	H	A	A	H	A	H	A
Result	W	D	W	W	L	D	L	W	D	W	W	W	L	D	L	W	W	W	W	W	D	W	W	W	W	D	L	W	L	W	W	D	W	W
Position	4																																	

Updated to match(es) played on 6 March 2011. Source: "World-Football.net". 11 August 2025.
A = Away; H = Home; W = Win; D = Draw; L = Loss

=== J.League Cup ===
2011-10-05 Quarter-finals	Gamba Osaka	3–1	Júbilo Iwata	Expo'70 Stadium, Suita, Osaka
19:03	Sasaki 43'; Rafinha 67'; 76' (o.g.)		Nasu 7'	Attendance: 4,112; Referee: Nobutsugu Murakami

2011-10-09 Semi-finals	Urawa Red Diamonds	2–1	Gamba Osaka	Saitama Stadium, Saitama
17:00	Umesaki 21'; Escudero 38'		Otsuka 90+3'	Attendance: 23,879; Referee: Hajime Matsuo

=== Emperor's Cup ===
2011-10-12 Second Round	Gamba Osaka	2–0	Sagawa Shiga	Osaka Expo '70 Stadium, Suita
19:00	Kawanishi; Kim	Report		Attendance: 2,932; Referee: Hiroyuki Kimura

2011-11-16 Third Round	Gamba Osaka	2–3 (a.e.t.)	Mito HollyHock	Osaka Expo '70 Stadium, Suita
19:00	Kim 40'; Sasaki 65'	Report	Ozawa 50'; Suzuki 76'; Koike 99'	Attendance: 2,938; Referee: Yosuke Kubota

=== AFC Champions League ===
==== Group stage ====
Group E
Team	Pld	W	D	L	GF	GA	GD	Pts
(Japan) Gamba Osaka	6	3	1	2	13	7	+6	10
(China) Tianjin Teda	6	3	1	2	8	6	+2	10
(South Korea) Jeju United	6	2	1	3	6	10	−4	7
(Australia) Melbourne Victory	6	1	3	2	7	11	−4	6

Tiebreakers

- Gamba Osaka and Tianjin Teda are ranked by their head-to-head records, as shown below.

Team	Pld	W	D	L	GF	GA	GD	Pts
(Japan) Gamba Osaka	2	1	0	1	3	2	+1	3
(China) Tianjin Teda	2	1	0	1	2	3	−1	3

1 March 2011 Group Stage	Gamba Osaka (Japan)	5–1	(Australia) Melbourne Victory	Osaka Expo '70 Stadium, Suita
19:00 UTC+09:00	Takei 4'; Adriano 7' (pen.); Lee Keun-Ho 10'; Futagawa 62'; Kim Seung-Yong 90+1'	Report	Muscat 21' (pen.)	Attendance: 12,949; Referee: Ali Hamad Madhad Saif Albadwawi (UAE)

15 March 2011 Group Stage	Tianjin Teda (China)	2–1	(Japan) Gamba Osaka	TEDA Football Stadium, Tianjin
19:30 UTC+08:00	Chen Tao 25'; Cao Yang 53' (pen.)	Report	Lee Keun-Ho 31'	Attendance: 26,866; Referee: Abdullah Balideh (Qatar)

5 April 2011 Group Stage	Jeju United (South Korea)	2–1	(Japan) Gamba Osaka	Jeju World Cup Stadium, Jeju
19:30 UTC+09:00	Shin Young-Rok 53'; Bae Ki-Jong 64'	Report	Nakazawa 23'	Attendance: 2,167; Referee: Mohsen Torky (Iran)

20 April 2011 Group Stage	Gamba Osaka (Japan)	3–1	(South Korea) Jeju United	Osaka Expo '70 Stadium, Suita
19:00 UTC+09:00	Adriano 26', 48'; Takei 88'	Report	Shin Young-Rok 67'	Attendance: 11,398; Referee: Ravshan Irmatov (Uzbekistan)

4 May 2011 Group Stage	Melbourne Victory (Australia)	1–1	(Japan) Gamba Osaka	Docklands Stadium, Melbourne
19:30 UTC+10:00	Leijer 12'	Report	Nakazawa 43'	Attendance: 7,437; Referee: Abdulrahman Abdou (Qatar)

11 May 2011 Group Stage	Gamba Osaka (Japan)	2–0	(China) Tianjin Teda	Osaka Expo '70 Stadium, Suita
19:00 UTC+09:00	Endō 74'; Usami 90+4' (pen.)	Report		Attendance: 7,939; Referee: Saeid Mozaffarizadeh (Iran)

==== Knock-out stage ====
24 May 2011 Round of 16	Gamba Osaka (Japan)	0–1	(Japan) Cerezo Osaka	Osaka Expo '70 Stadium, Suita
19:00 UTC+09:00		Report	Takahashi 88'	Attendance: 16,463; Referee: Alireza Faghani (Iran)
