= Takahiro Futagawa =

Japanese footballer (born 1980)

Takahiro Futagawa 二川 孝広
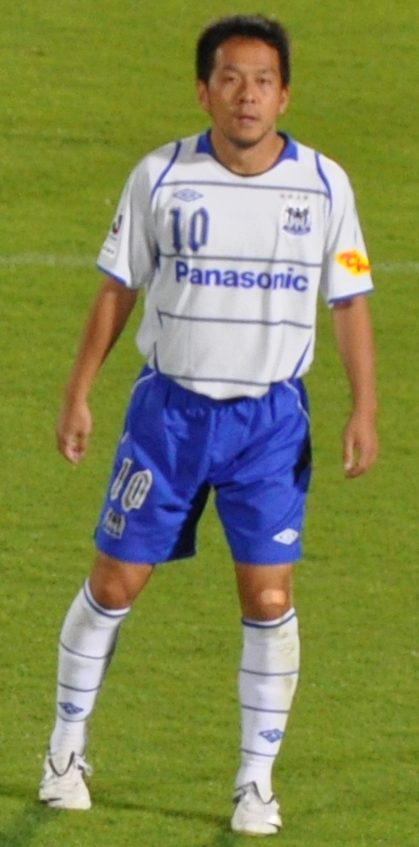
- Futagawa with Gamba Osaka in 2010

Personal information
- Full name: Takahiro Futagawa
- Date of birth: 27 June 1980 (age 46)
- Place of birth: Kagoshima, Japan
- Height: 1.68 m (5 ft 6 in)
- Position: Midfielder

Team information
- Current team: FC Tiamo Hirakata (manager)

Youth career
- 1996–1998: Gamba Osaka

Senior career*
Years	Team	Apps	(Gls)
1999–2016	Gamba Osaka	430	(47)
2016	→Gamba Osaka U-23 (loan)	10	(1)
2016–2018	Tokyo Verdy	22	(1)
2018	Tochigi SC	7	(0)
2019–2022	FC Tiamo Hirakata	27	(5)
Total		491	(54)

International career^{‡}
2006	Japan	1	(0)

Managerial career
- 2023–: Tiamo Hirakata
Medal record
Gamba Osaka
Winner	AFC Champions League	2008
Winner	J1 League	2005
Winner	J1 League	2014
Runner-up	J1 League	2010
Runner-up	J1 League	2015
Winner	J.League Cup	2007
Winner	J.League Cup	2014
Runner-up	J.League Cup	2005
Runner-up	J.League Cup	2015
Runner-up	J.League Cup	2016
Winner	Emperor's Cup	2008
Winner	Emperor's Cup	2009
Winner	Emperor's Cup	2014
Winner	Emperor's Cup	2015
Runner-up	Emperor's Cup	2006
Runner-up	Emperor's Cup	2012
- * Club domestic league appearances and goals as of end of the 2022 season ‡ National team caps and goals as of 4 October 2006

Takahiro Futagawa (二川 孝広, Futagawa Takahiro; born 27 June 1980) is a Japanese former football player and currently manager of former team Tiamo Hirakata.

== Club career ==
Futagawa was born in Kagoshima Prefecture on 27 June 1980. He joined J1 League club Gamba Osaka from youth team in 1999. He debuted in 1999 season and played many matches as offensive midfielder from 2000 season. He played as central player for the club for a long time. In 2003, he was given number "10" shirt and Gamba was at the 3rd place in J1 League. In 2005, Gamba won the champions in J1 League first time in the club history. In 2008, Gamba won the champions in AFC Champions League for 2 years in a row as Japanese club (Urawa Reds won in 2007). Gamba also won the Emperor's Cup. In 2009, Gamba won the Emperor's Cup for 2 years in a row. This is the golden era in the club history and he was one of the central player under manager Akira Nishino (2002–2011).

However manager Nishino left Gamba end of 2011 season and the club performance deteriorated soon. In 2012, Gamba finished at the 17th place of 18 clubs and was relegated to J2 League. Futagawa remained in Gamba and Gamba won the champions in 2013 season. In 2014 season, Gamba returned to J1 and won all three major title in Japan, J1 League, J.League Cup and Emperor's Cup. However his opportunity to play decreased in 2014 and he could hardly play in the match from 2015.

In June 2016, Futagawa moved to J2 club Tokyo Verdy. He played many matches in 2016 season. However he could hardly play in the match from 2017. In March 2018, he moved to Tochigi SC. In 2019, he moved to Regional Leagues club FC Tiamo Hirakata.

In 2022, Futagawa retirement from football after 23 years as professional career have been end.

== International career ==
On 4 August 2006, he debuted for Japan national team against Ghana.

== Managerial career ==
On 20 November 2022, Futagawa appointment manager of JFL club, Tiamo Hirakata for upcoming 2023 season after retirement from football player in 2022 season.

== Career statistics ==
=== Club ===
As of end of 2022 season

Club performance			League		Cup		League Cup		Continental		Other		Total	
Season	Club	League	Apps	Goals	Apps	Goals	Apps	Goals	Apps	Goals	Apps	Goals	Apps	Goals
Japan			League		Emperor's Cup		J.League Cup		Asia		Other^{1}		Total	
1999	Gamba Osaka	J1 League	5	0	2	0	2	0	-		-		9	0
2000	Gamba Osaka	J1 League	21	0	3	1	2	0	-		-		26	1
2001	Gamba Osaka	J1 League	26	2	3	1	4	1	-		-		33	4
2002	Gamba Osaka	J1 League	28	2	2	0	7	0	-		-		37	2
2003	Gamba Osaka	J1 League	29	5	2	0	5	0	-		-		36	5
2004	Gamba Osaka	J1 League	30	4	3	0	7	0	-		-		40	4
2005	Gamba Osaka	J1 League	29	0	2	0	8	0	-		-		39	0
2006	Gamba Osaka	J1 League	33	6	5	1	2	0	9	1	1	0	46	8
2007	Gamba Osaka	J1 League	34	7	4	1	11	3	-		1	1	49	11
2008	Gamba Osaka	J1 League	29	1	1	0	4	2	17	3	-		46	6
2009	Gamba Osaka	J1 League	21	4	6	1	2	0	1	0	-		30	5
2010	Gamba Osaka	J1 League	27	3	3	0	2	0	8	1	1	0	41	4
2011	Gamba Osaka	J1 League	32	5	1	0	2	0	7	1	-		42	6
2012	Gamba Osaka	J1 League	29	3	4	0	0	0	5	0	-		38	3
2013	Gamba Osaka	J2 League	36	4	2	0	-		-		-		38	4
2014	Gamba Osaka	J1 League	19	1	2	1	6	0	-		-		27	2
2015	Gamba Osaka	J1 League	2	0	0	0	4	1	4	0	1	0	11	1
2016	Gamba Osaka	J1 League	0	0	0	0	0	0	1	0	0	0	1	0
Total			430	47	45	6	68	7	52	6	4	1	599	67
2016	Gamba Osaka U-23	J3 League	10	1	-		-		-		-		10	1
Total			10	1	-		-		-		-		10	1
2016	Tokyo Verdy	J2 League	20	1	2	0	-		-		-		22	1
2017	Tokyo Verdy	J2 League	2	0	1	0	-		-		-		3	0
2018	Tokyo Verdy	J2 League	0	0	0	0	-		-		-		0	0
Total			22	1	3	0	-		-		-		25	1
2018	Tochigi SC	J2 League	7	0	0	0	-		-		-		7	0
Total			7	0	0	0	-		-		-		7	1
2019	Tiamo Hirakata	Japanese Regional Leagues	6	3	0	0	-		-		-		6	3
2020	Tiamo Hirakata	Japanese Regional Leagues	6	1	1	0	-		-		-		7	1
2021	Tiamo Hirakata	Japan Football League	7	0	0	0	-		-		-		7	0
2022	Tiamo Hirakata	Japan Football League	8	1	0	0	-		-		-		8	1
Total			27	5	1	0	-		-		-		28	5
Career total			486	76	49	6	68	7	52	6	4	1	659	96

^{1} = Japanese Super Cup and Suruga Bank Championship appearances.

=== FIFA Club World Cup career statistics ===
Season	Team	Apps	Goals
2008	Gamba Osaka	2	0

=== International ===
Japan national team
Year	Apps	Goals
2006	1	0
Total	1	0

== Managerial statistics ==
As of 26 March 2023.

Managerial record by club and tenure
Team	From	To	Record				
Team	From	To	G	W	D	L	Win %
Tiamo Hirakata	20 November 2022	present	2	2	0	0	100.00
Total			2	2	0	0	100.00

== Honours ==
- AFC Champions League: 2008
- Pan-Pacific Championship: 2008
- J1 League: 2005, 2014
- J2 League: 2013
- Emperor's Cup: 2008, 2009, 2014, 2015
- J.League Cup: 2007, 2014
- Japanese Super Cup: 2007
