= Tatsuya Uchida =

Japanese footballer

Tatsuya Uchida 内田 達也
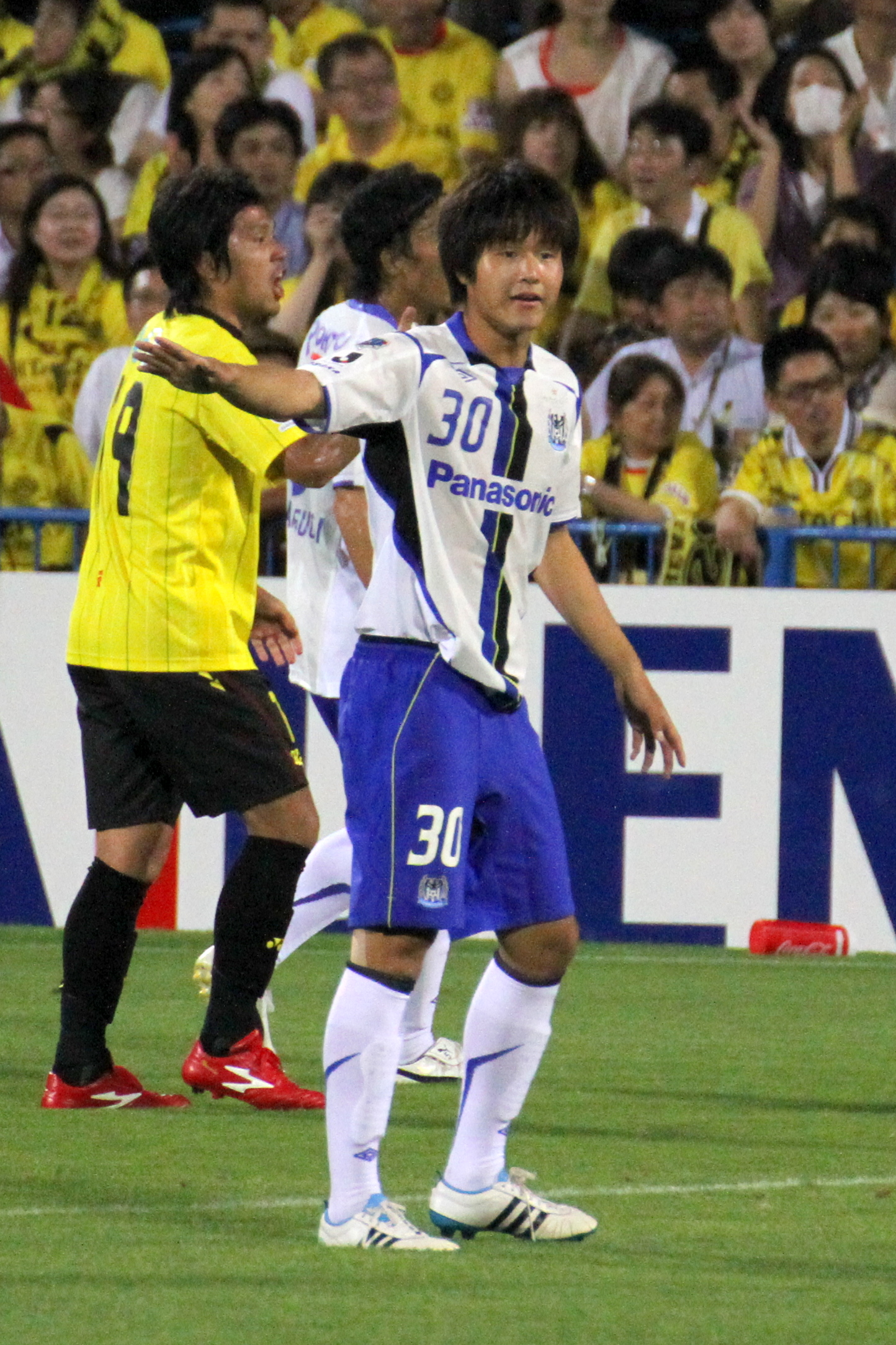

Personal information
- Full name: Tatsuya Uchida
- Date of birth: 8 February 1992 (age 34)
- Place of birth: Takarazuka, Hyogo, Japan
- Height: 1.78 m (5 ft 10 in)
- Positions: Defensive midfielder; centre back; full-back

Team information
- Current team: FC Tiamo Hirakata
- Number: 8

Youth career
- 1999−03: Koniryo Nakayama FC
- 2004−09: Gamba Osaka Youth

Senior career*
Years	Team	Apps	(Gls)
2010–2017	Gamba Osaka	58	(1)
2016	→ Gamba Osaka U-23 (loan)	14	(1)
2017	→ Tokyo Verdy (loan)	41	(2)
2018–2019	Tokyo Verdy	99	(2)
2020–2024	Thespa Gunma	121	(3)
2024-	FC Tiamo Hirakata	16	(0)

International career
2009	Japan U-17	3	(0)
Medal record
Gamba Osaka
Winner	J1 League	2014
Runner-up	J1 League	2010
Runner-up	J1 League	2015
Winner	J.League Cup	2014
Runner-up	J.League Cup	2015
Runner-up	J.League Cup	2016
Winner	Emperor's Cup	2014
Winner	Emperor's Cup	2015
Runner-up	Emperor's Cup	2012
- * Club domestic league appearances and goals as of 20:49, 8 August 2020 (UTC)

Tatsuya Uchida (内田 達也, Uchida Tatsuya; born 8 February 1992) is a Japanese professional footballer who plays for club Thespa Gunma.

== National team career ==
In October 2009, Uchida was elected Japan U-17 national team for 2009 U-17 World Cup. He served as captain and played full time in all 3 matches as center back.

== Club statistics ==
As of end of 2018 season.

Club performance			League		Cup		League Cup		Continental		Other		Total	
Season	Club	League	Apps	Goals	Apps	Goals	Apps	Goals	Apps	Goals	Apps	Goals	Apps	Goals
Japan			League		Emperor's Cup		League Cup		AFC		Super Cup		Total	
2010	Gamba Osaka	J1 League	0	0	0	0	0	0	0	0	-		0	0
2011	Gamba Osaka	J1 League	5	0	2	0	0	0	1	0	-		8	0
2012	Gamba Osaka	J1 League	5	0	0	0	0	0	1	0	-		6	0
2013	Gamba Osaka	J2 League	33	1	2	0	-		-		-		35	1
2014	Gamba Osaka	J1 League	12	0	2	0	5	0	-		-		19	0
2015	Gamba Osaka	J1 League	0	0	2	0	0	0	0	0	0	0	2	0
2016	Gamba Osaka	J1 League	3	0	0	0	1	0	1	0	0	0	5	0
Total			58	1	8	0	6	0	3	0	0	0	75	1
2017	Tokyo Verdy	J2 League	41	2	1	0	-		-		-		42	2
2018	Tokyo Verdy	J2 League	41	0	0	0	-		-		-		41	0
Total			82	2	1	0	-		-		-		83	2
Career Total			140	3	9	0	6	0	3	0	0	0	158	3

Reserves performance

Club performance			League		Total	
Season	Club	League	Apps	Goals	Apps	Goals
Japan			League		Total	
2016	Gamba Osaka U-23	J3	14	1	14	1
Career total			14	1	14	1

== Honours ==
=== Club ===
Gamba Osaka

- J1 League (1) : 2014
- J2 League (1) : 2013
- Emperor's Cup (2) : 2014, 2015
- J.League Cup (1) : 2014
