= Takaharu Nishino =

Japanese footballer

Personal information
- Full name: Takaharu Nishino
- Date of birth: 14 September 1993 (age 33)
- Place of birth: Ibaraki, Osaka, Japan
- Height: 1.87 m (6 ft 1 1/2 in)
- Position: Centre back

Team information
- Current team: Kamatamare Sanuki
- Number: 2

Youth career
- –2005: Kasuga Santos JSC
- 2006–2011: Gamba Osaka

Senior career*
Years	Team	Apps	(Gls)
2012–2018	Gamba Osaka	47	(4)
2014–2015	→ J.League U-22	3	(0)
2016–2018	Gamba Osaka U-23	46	(3)
2017	→ JEF United Chiba (loan)	5	(1)
2019–	Kamatamare Sanuki	43	(2)

International career
2014	Japan U21	4	(0)
Medal record
Gamba Osaka
Winner	J1 League	2014
Runner-up	J1 League	2015
Winner	J.League Cup	2014
Runner-up	J.League Cup	2015
Runner-up	J.League Cup	2016
Winner	Emperor's Cup	2014
Winner	Emperor's Cup	2015
Runner-up	Emperor's Cup	2012
- * Club domestic league appearances and goals as of 31 December 2021

Takaharu Nishino (西野 貴治, Nishino Takaharu; born 14 September 1993) is a Japanese football player who currently plays as a defender for Kamatamare Sanuki.

== Career statistics ==
=== Club ===
Last update: 2 December 2018

Club performance			League		Cup		League Cup		Continental		Other^{1}		Total	
Season	Club	League	Apps	Goals	Apps	Goals	Apps	Goals	Apps	Goals	Apps	Goals	Apps	Goals
Japan			League		Emperor's Cup		League Cup		Asia				Total	
2012	Gamba Osaka	J1	0	0	1	0	0	0	0	0	-		1	0
2013	Gamba Osaka	J2	29	3	2	0	-		-		-		31	3
2014	Gamba Osaka	J1	12	1	1	1	8	1	-		-		21	3
2015	Gamba Osaka	J1	3	0	1	0	4	0	1	0	3	0	12	0
2016	Gamba Osaka	J1	3	0	0	0	0	0	1	0	0	0	4	0
2017	Gamba Osaka	J1	0	0	0	0	0	0	0	0	-		0	0
2018	Gamba Osaka	J1	0	0	0	0	2	1	-		-		2	1
Total			47	4	5	1	14	2	2	0	3	0	71	7
2017	JEF United	J2	5	1	0	0	-		-		-		5	1
Total			5	1	0	0	-		-		-		5	1
Career Total			52	5	5	1	14	2	2	0	3	0	76	8

^{1} includes J. League Championship and Japanese Super Cup appearances.

Reserves performance

Club performance			League		Total	
Season	Club	League	Apps	Goals	Apps	Goals
Japan			League		Total	
2014	J.League U-22 Selection	J3	2	0	2	0
2015	J.League U-22 Selection	J3	1	0	1	0
2016	Gamba Osaka U-23	J3	17	1	17	1
2017	Gamba Osaka U-23	J3	4	0	4	0
2018	Gamba Osaka U-23	J3	25	2	25	2
Career total			49	3	49	3

== Honors ==
Gamba Osaka

- J. League Division 1 - 2014
- J. League Division 2 - 2013
- Emperor's Cup - 2014, 2015
- J. League Cup - 2014
