= Daiki Niwa (footballer) =

Japanese footballer

Daiki Niwa 丹羽 大輝
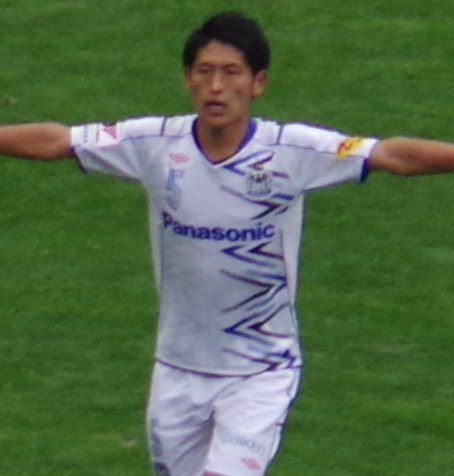

Personal information
- Date of birth: 16 January 1986 (age 40)
- Place of birth: Kawachinagano, Osaka, Japan
- Height: 1.81 m (5 ft 11 1/2 in)
- Position: Defender

Team information
- Current team: Deusto

Youth career
- 1998–2003: Gamba Osaka

Senior career*
Years	Team	Apps	(Gls)
2004–2017	Gamba Osaka	131	(4)
2007	→ Tokushima Vortis (loan)	45	(1)
2008	→ Omiya Ardija (loan)	0	(0)
2008–2011	→ Avispa Fukuoka (loan)	109	(3)
2017–2018	Sanfrecce Hiroshima	14	(0)
2018–2020	FC Tokyo	9	(0)
2018–2020	→ FC Tokyo U-23 (loan)	18	(0)
2021–2023	Sestao River Club	41	(1)
2023–2025	Arenas	36	(2)
2025–	Deusto	10	(0)

International career
2015	Japan	2	(0)
Medal record
Gamba Osaka
Winner	J1 League	2005
Winner	J1 League	2014
Runner-up	J1 League	2015
Winner	J.League Cup	2014
Runner-up	J.League Cup	2005
Runner-up	J.League Cup	2015
Runner-up	J.League Cup	2016
Winner	Emperor's Cup	2014
Winner	Emperor's Cup	2015
Runner-up	Emperor's Cup	2006
Runner-up	Emperor's Cup	2012
Sanfrecce Hiroshima
Runner-up	J1 League	2018
- * Club domestic league appearances and goals as of 9 November 2025

Daiki Niwa (丹羽 大輝, Niwa Daiki; born 16 January 1986) is a Japanese footballer who plays for Spanish Tercera Federación club Deusto.

== Playing career ==
He spent 4 years on loan at Avispa Fukuoka during which time he had spells as club captain, before returning to his parent club Gamba Osaka at the start of the 2012 season.

== National team career ==
On 7 May 2015, Japan's coach Vahid Halilhodžić called him for a two-days training camp. On 23 July 2015, he was called again for the upcoming 2015 EAFF East Asian Cup.

== Club statistics ==
As of end of 2020 season

Club performance			League		Cup		League Cup		Continental		Other^{1}		Total	
Season	Club	League	Apps	Goals	Apps	Goals	Apps	Goals	Apps	Goals	Apps	Goals	Apps	Goals
Japan			League		Emperor's Cup		J.League Cup		Asia				Total	
2004	Gamba Osaka	J1	0	0	0	0	0	0	-		-		0	0
2005	Gamba Osaka	J1	0	0	0	0	0	0	-		-		0	0
2006	Gamba Osaka	J1	0	0	0	0	0	0	0	0	-		0	0
Total			0	0	0	0	0	0	0	0	-		0	0
2007	Tokushima Vortis	J2	45	1	2	0	-		-		-		47	1
Total			45	1	2	0	-		-		-		47	1
2008	Omiya Ardija	J1	0	0	0	0	2	0	-		-		2	0
Total			0	0	0	0	2	0	-		-		2	0
2008	Avispa Fukuoka	J2	9	1	1	0	-		-		-		10	1
2009	Avispa Fukuoka	J2	35	1	2	0	-		-		-		37	1
2010	Avispa Fukuoka	J2	35	1	4	1	-		-		-		39	2
2011	Avispa Fukuoka	J1	30	0	0	0	1	0	-		-		31	0
Total			109	3	7	1	1	0	-		-		117	4
2012	Gamba Osaka	J1	14	0	3	0	1	1	3	0	-		21	1
2013	Gamba Osaka	J2	25	2	2	1	-		-		-		27	3
2014	Gamba Osaka	J1	25	2	5	0	4	0	-		-		34	2
2015	Gamba Osaka	J1	34	0	4	0	1	0	12	0	4	0	55	0
2016	Gamba Osaka	J1	28	0	2	0	5	1	3	0	1	0	39	1
2017	Gamba Osaka	J1	5	0	1	0	0	0	1	0	-		7	0
Total			131	4	17	1	11	2	19	0	5	0	183	7
2017	Sanfrecce Hiroshima	J1	13	0	0	0	1	0	-		-		14	0
2018	Sanfrecce Hiroshima	J1	1	0	0	0	5	0	-		-		6	0
Total			14	0	0	0	6	0	-		-		20	0
2018	FC Tokyo	J1	6	0	1	0	0	0	-		-		7	0
2019	FC Tokyo	J1	0	0	2	0	2	0	-		-		4	0
2020	FC Tokyo	J1	3	0	-		0	0	1	0	-		4	0
Total			9	0	3	0	2	0	1	0	-		15	0
2021	Sestao River Club	Tercera División	0	0	0	0	0	0	-		-		7	0
Total			0	0	0	0	0	0	0	0	-		0	0
Career Total			308	8	29	2	22	2	20	0	5	0	384	12

^{1} includes J. League Championship and Japanese Super Cup appearances.

== Reserves performance ==
Last Updated: 30 November 2019

Club performance			League		Total	
Season	Club	League	Apps	Goals	Apps	Goals
Japan			League		Total	
2018	FC Tokyo U-23	J3	1	0	1	0
2019	FC Tokyo U-23	J3	17	0	17	0
Career total			18	0	18	0

== National team statistics ==
Japan national team
Year	Apps	Goals
2015	2	0
Total	2	0

== Honors ==
Gamba Osaka

- J1 League - 2014
- J2 League - 2013
- Emperor's Cup - 2014, 2015
- J.League Cup - 2014
- Japanese Super Cup - 2015

FC Tokyo

- J.League Cup - 2020
