= 2014 Gamba Osaka season =

Gamba Osaka
2014 season
- Chairman: Teruhisa Noro
- Manager: Kenta Hasegawa
- J.League: 1st
- Emperor's Cup: Winners
- J.League Cup: Winners
- Top goalscorer: League: Takashi Usami 10; All: Takashi Usami 21
- Highest home attendance: 19,569 vs Cerezo Osaka, 20 September 2014 (J1 League)
- Lowest home attendance: 2,862 vs Zweigen Kanazawa, 12 July 2014 (J.League Cup)
- Average home league attendance: 14,749

The 2014 Gamba Osaka season was Gamba Osaka's 21st season in the J.League Division 1 and 27th overall in the Japanese top flight. It also included the 2014 J.League Cup and 2014 Emperor's Cup. The season was one of unparalleled success as it saw them win the treble with an incredible comeback in the second half of the league season which saw them crowned J.League champions following a 0–0 draw away to Tokushima Vortis in December. In addition they added both the J.League Cup and the Emperor's Cup to their trophy cabinet. The feat was made all the more incredible by the fact that Gamba were only promoted back to J.League 1 at the beginning of 2014 following a one-season spell in the Japanese second division.

== J.League 1 Results 2014 ==
Round	Date	Opponents	H / A	Result F–A	Scorers	Attendance
1	1 March 2014	Urawa Red Diamonds	H	0–1		18,438
2	8 March 2014	Albirex Niigata	A	2–0	Iwashita 69', Omori 82'	22,931
3	15 March 2014	Vegalta Sendai	A	0–0		13,380
4	23 March 2014	Sanfrecce Hiroshima	H	1–1	Endō 25'	18,301
5	29 March 2014	Sagan Tosu	A	0–2		12,115
6	6 April 2014	Kashima Antlers	H	0–2		12,899
7	12 April 2014	Cerezo Osaka	A	2–2	Abe 42', 53'	42,723
8	19 April 2014	Omiya Ardija	H	2–1	Niwa 83', Konno 88'	11,059
9	26 April 2014	Kawasaki Frontale	A	1–2	Endō 19'	19,164
10	29 April 2014	Kashiwa Reysol	H	1–2	Lins 13'	13,845
11	3 May 2014	Yokohama F. Marinos	A	0–2		35,550
12	6 May 2014	Tokushima Vortis	H	3–0	Usami 37', Abe 74', Kurata 90'+3	12,654
13	10 May 2014	Nagoya Grampus	A	2–1	Abe 66', Omori 85'	20,781
14	17 May 2014	FC Tokyo	A	0–3		26,485
15	19 July 2014	Ventforet Kofu	H	2–0	Usami 9', Kurata 27'	11,373
16	23 July 2014	Shimizu S-Pulse	H	4–0	Abe 6', Omori 9', Patric 56', Lins 88'	10,898
17	27 July 2014	Vissel Kobe	A	5–1	Usami 14', 26', Patric 43', 63', Abe 72'	18,012
18	2 August 2014	Yokohama F. Marinos	H	2–0	Patric 82', Endō 89'	15,363
19	9 August 2014	Omiya Ardija	A	2–0	Konno 27', Usami 51'	10,541
20	16 August 2014	Nagoya Grampus	H	0–1		15,383
21	23 August 2014	Ventforet Kofu	A	3–3	Usami 48', Endō (pen.) 67', Kurata 90'+3	12,191
22	30 August 2014	Albirex Niigata	H	5–0	Nishino 31', Kurata 39', 72', Futagawa 44', Lins 90'	12,696
23	13 September 2014	Sanfrecce Hiroshima	A	1–0	Usami 33'	17,490
24	20 September 2014	Cerezo Osaka	H	2–0	Abe 37', Sato 89'	19,569
25	23 September 2014	Shimizu S-Pulse	A	3–0	Usami 22' Niwa 84', Lins 90'+5	15,093
26	27 September 2014	Sagan Tosu	H	4–1	Endō (pen.) 25', Patric 67', 79', 84'	13,221
27	5 October 2014	Kashima Antlers	A	3–2	Aoki (o.g.) 29', Patric 72', Lins 90'+3	17,939
28	18 October 2014	Kawasaki Frontale	H	1–0	Yonekura 58'	17,615
29	22 October 2014	Kashiwa Reysol	A	0–1		7,474
30	26 October 2014	FC Tokyo	H	2–1	Omori 53', Endō 59'	15,695
31	2 November 2014	Vegalta Sendai	H	1–1	Omori 46'	13,142
32	22 November 2014	Urawa Red Diamonds	A	2–0	Sato 88', Kurata 90'	56,758
33	29 November 2014	Vissel Kobe	H	3–1	Usami 36', 49' Patric 43'	18,587
34	6 December 2014	Tokushima Vortis	A	0–0		17,274

=== Final standings ===
Pos	Team	Pld	W	D	L	GF	GA	GD	Pts	Qualification or relegation
1	Gamba Osaka (C)	34	19	6	9	59	31	+28	63	Qualification for 2015 AFC Champions League group stage (Note: Because Gamba Osaka also won the 2014 Emperor's Cup, the group stage spot has been given to third-placed Kashima Antlers, while ACL qualification spot was awarded to the fourth-placed Kashiwa Reysol.)
2	Urawa Red Diamonds	34	18	8	8	52	32	+20	62	Qualification for 2015 AFC Champions League group stage
3	Kashima Antlers	34	18	6	10	64	39	+25	60	Qualification for 2015 AFC Champions League group stage
4	Kashiwa Reysol	34	17	9	8	48	40	+8	60	Qualification for 2015 AFC Champions League Third qualifying round
5	Sagan Tosu	34	19	3	12	41	33	+8	60	

Updated to match(es) played on 8 December 2014. Source: J.League Data
Rules for classification: 1) points; 2) goal difference; 3) number of goals scored.
(C) Champions

=== Match Day Line-Ups ===
The following players appeared for Gamba Osaka during 2014 J.League 1:

Player Appearances – 2014 J.League Division 1
Round	Opponent	GK	RB	LB	CB	CB	RM	LM	CM	CM	FW	FW	Substituted on	Substituted on	Substituted on
1	Urawa Red Diamonds	Higashiguchi	Kaji (substituted off)	Fujiharu	Niwa	Iwashita	Futagawa (substituted off)	Endō	Konno	Uchida (substituted off)	Sato	Kurata	Lins	Yonekura	Omori
2	Albirex Niigata	Higashiguchi	Kaji	Fujiharu	Niwa	Iwashita	Yonekura (substituted off)	Endō (substituted off)	Konno	Uchida	Sato (substituted off)	Kurata	Nishino	Lins	Omori
3	Vegalta Sendai	Higashiguchi	Kaji	Fujiharu	Niwa	Iwashita	Omori (substituted off)	Endō	Konno	Uchida	Sato (substituted off)	Kurata	Lins	Yonekura	
4	Sanfrecce Hiroshima	Higashiguchi	Kaji (substituted off)	Fujiharu	Niwa	Iwashita	Abe	Endō	Konno	Myojin (substituted off)	Lins	Kurata (substituted off)	Futagawa	Yonekura	Sato
5	Sagan Tosu	Higashiguchi	Oh	Fujiharu	Niwa (substituted off)	Iwashita	Abe (substituted off)	Endō	Konno	Myojin (substituted off)	Lins	Sato	Futagawa	Omori	Uchida
6	Kashima Antlers	Higashiguchi	Kaji	Fujiharu	Niwa (substituted off)	Iwashita	Abe	Kurata (substituted off)	Konno	Endō	Lins	Sato (substituted off)	Futagawa	Myojin	Omori
7	Cerezo Osaka	Higashiguchi	Kaji	Fujiharu	Niwa	Iwashita	Abe	Omori (substituted off)	Konno (substituted off)	Uchida	Endō	Lins (substituted off)	Futagawa	Kurata	Sato
8	Omiya Ardija	Higashiguchi	Oh	Fujiharu	Niwa	Iwashita	Abe	Omori (substituted off)	Endō	Uchida	Sato (substituted off)	Lins (substituted off)	Futagawa	Kurata	Konno
9	Kawasaki Frontale	Higashiguchi	Oh (substituted off)	Fujiharu	Niwa	Iwashita	Abe	Kurata	Konno	Uchida (substituted off)	Endō	Lins (substituted off)	Myojin	Sato	Usami
10	Kashiwa Reysol	Higashiguchi	Konno	Fujiharu	Niwa	Iwashita	Abe	Futagawa (substituted off)	Endō	Uchida (substituted off)	Kurata (substituted off)	Lins	Myojin	Omori	Usami
11	Yokohama F. Marinos	Higashiguchi	Oh	Fujiharu	Niwa	Iwashita	Abe	Omori (substituted off)	Endō	Uchida (substituted off)	Sato (substituted off)	Lins	Kurata	Konno	Usami
12	Tokushima Vortis	Higashiguchi	Oh	Fujiharu	Nishino	Iwashita	Omori (substituted off)	Futagawa	Endō	Konno	Usami	Lins (substituted off)	Kurata	Abe	
13	Nagoya Grampus	Higashiguchi	Oh	Fujiharu	Nishino	Iwashita	Abe (substituted off)	Futagawa (substituted off)	Endō	Konno	Usami (substituted off)	Kurata	Niwa	Omori	Sato
14	FC Tokyo	Higashiguchi	Oh	Fujiharu	Nishino	Iwashita (substituted off)	Abe (substituted off)	Omori (substituted off)	Endō	Konno	Usami	Kurata	Lins	Futagawa	Okazaki
15	Ventforet Kofu	Higashiguchi	Yonekura	Oh	Nishino	Iwashita	Abe (substituted off)	Omori	Endō	Konno	Usami (substituted off)	Kurata	Uchida	Patric	
16	Shimizu S-Pulse	Higashiguchi	Yonekura	Oh	Nishino	Iwashita	Abe (substituted off)	Omori (substituted off)	Endō	Konno	Usami	Patric (substituted off)	Lins	Futagawa	Sato
17	Vissel Kobe	Higashiguchi	Yonekura	Oh	Nishino	Iwashita	Abe (substituted off)	Omori (substituted off)	Endō	Konno	Usami	Patric (substituted off)	Futagawa	Kurata	Myojin
18	Yokohama F. Marinos	Higashiguchi	Yonekura (substituted off)	Oh	Nishino	Iwashita	Abe	Kurata (substituted off)	Endō	Konno	Usami (substituted off)	Patric	Fujiharu	Futagawa	Myojin
19	Omiya Ardija	Higashiguchi	Yonekura	Oh	Nishino	Iwashita	Abe (substituted off)	Kurata	Endō	Konno	Usami (substituted off)	Patric (substituted off)	Fujiharu	Myojin	Sato
20	Nagoya Grampus	Higashiguchi	Oh (substituted off)	Fujiharu	Nishino	Iwashita	Abe (substituted off)	Kurata (substituted off)	Endō	Konno	Usami	Patric	Lins	Futagawa	Yonekura
21	Ventforet Kofu	Higashiguchi	Yonekura	Fujiharu	Nishino	Iwashita	Endō (substituted off)	Kurata	Okazaki (substituted off)	Konno	Usami (substituted off)	Patric	Niwa	Futagawa	Myojin
22	Albirex Niigata	Higashiguchi	Yonekura	Fujiharu	Nishino	Iwashita	Futagawa (substituted off)	Kurata (substituted off)	Endō	Konno	Usami	Patric (substituted off)	Lins	Abe	Sato
23	Sanfrecce Hiroshima	Higashiguchi	Oh	Fujiharu	Niwa	Iwashita	Abe	Endō	Myojin (substituted off)	Konno	Usami (substituted off)	Sato (substituted off)	Kurata	Uchida	Patric
24	Cerezo Osaka	Higashiguchi	Yonekura	Oh	Niwa	Kim	Abe (substituted off)	Kurata (substituted off)	Endō	Konno	Usami	Patric (substituted off)	Lins	Futagawa	Sato
25	Shimizu S-Pulse	Higashiguchi	Oh (substituted off)	Fujiharu	Niwa	Iwashita	Abe (substituted off)	Futagawa (substituted off)	Endō	Konno	Usami	Sato	Kim	Lins	Kurata
26	Sagan Tosu	Higashiguchi	Yonekura	Oh	Niwa	Iwashita	Abe (substituted off)	Omori (substituted off)	Endō	Konno	Usami	Patric (substituted off)	Lins	Futagawa	Sato
27	Kashima Antlers	Higashiguchi	Yonekura	Oh	Niwa	Iwashita	Abe (substituted off)	Omori (substituted off)	Endō	Konno	Usami (substituted off)	Patric	Lins	Kurata	Sato
28	Kashima Antlers	Higashiguchi	Yonekura	Oh	Niwa	Iwashita	Abe (substituted off)	Omori	Endō	Uchida (substituted off)	Usami (substituted off)	Patric	Lins	Kurata	Myojin
29	Kashiwa Reysol	Higashiguchi	Yonekura	Fujiharu	Niwa	Iwashita	Abe (substituted off)	Endō	Myojin (substituted off)	Konno	Usami	Sato (substituted off)	Kurata	Omori	Patric
30	Kashiwa Reysol	Higashiguchi	Yonekura	Oh	Niwa	Kim	Omori (substituted off)	Kurata (substituted off)	Endō	Konno	Usami (substituted off)	Patric	Fujiharu	Lins	Abe
31	Kashiwa Reysol	Higashiguchi	Yonekura	Oh	Niwa	Iwashita	Abe	Omori (substituted off)	Endō	Konno	Usami (substituted off)	Patric (substituted off)	Lins	Kurata	Sato
32	Urawa Red Diamonds	Higashiguchi	Yonekura	Oh	Niwa	Iwashita	Abe	Omori (substituted off)	Endō	Konno	Usami (substituted off)	Patric (substituted off)	Lins	Kurata	Sato
33	Vissel Kobe	Higashiguchi	Oh	Fujiharu (substituted off)	Niwa	Iwashita	Abe	Omori	Endō	Konno	Usami (substituted off)	Patric (substituted off)	Kim	Lins	Sato
34	Tokushima Vortis	Higashiguchi	Yonekura (substituted off)	Oh	Niwa	Iwashita	Abe (substituted off)	Omori (substituted off)	Endō	Konno	Usami	Patric	Fujiharu	Lins	Kurata

(substituted on) = Substitute on, (substituted off) = Substitute Off, = Number of goals scored, = Yellow Card and = Red Card.

== J.League Cup results ==
Round	Date	Opponents	H / A	Result F–A	Scorers	Attendance
1	19 March 2014	Vissel Kobe	H	2–0	Lins 47', Sato 53'	8,378
2	2 April 2014	Shimizu S-Pulse	A	0–1		8,033
3	16 April 2014	Sagan Tosu	A	2–0	Omori 34', Ogawa 73'	8,033
4	21 May 2014	Kashima Antlers	H	2–1	Kurata 4', Yonekura 80'	8,103
5	24 May 2014	FC Tokyo	H	3–1	Usami 16', 52' Nishino 67'	12,818
6	28 May 2014	Vegalta Sendai	A	0–1		7,965
QF	3 September 2014	Vissel Kobe	A	1–1	Usami 12'	13,653
QF	7 September 2014	Vissel Kobe	H	3–0	Abe 2', Usami 28', Kurata 83'	11,294
SF	9 October 2014	Kawasaki Frontale	H	3–1	Yonekura 16', Usami 28', Patric 49'	5,482
SF	12 October 2014	Kawasaki Frontale	A	2–3	Abe 42', 45'	16,211
F	8 November 2014	Sanfrecce Hiroshima	N	3–2	Patric 38', 54', Omori 71'	38,126

=== Match day line-ups ===
Player Appearances – 2014 J.League Cup
Round	Opponent	GK	RB	LB	CB	CB	RM	LM	CM	CM	FW	FW	Substituted on	Substituted on	Substituted on
1	Vissel Kobe	Higashiguchi	Yonekura	Oh	Niwa	Nishino	Abe	Futagawa (substituted off)	Myojin (substituted off)	Konno	Sato	Lins (substituted off)	Kurata	Ogawa	T. Uchida
2	Shimizu S-Pulse	Higashiguchi	Oh	Fujiharu	Kim (substituted off)	Nishino	Omori	Futagawa (substituted off)	Endō	Konno	Kurata	Ogawa (substituted off)	Lins	Sato	T. Uchida
3	Sagan Tosu	Kawata	Oh	Y. Uchida	Kim	Nishino	Omori (substituted off)	Futagawa (substituted off)	Myojin	Ideguchi	Kurata	Takagi (substituted off)	Evson	Sato	Ogawa
4	Kashima Antlers	Higashiguchi	Yonekura	Fujiharu	Nishino	Iwashita	Abe	Futagawa (substituted off)	Okazaki	Ideguchi (substituted off)	Kurata	Sato (substituted off)	Niwa	Omori	T. Uchida
5	FC Tokyo	Higashiguchi	Oh	Fujiharu	Nishino	Iwashita	Abe (substituted off)	Omori (substituted off)	Okazaki (substituted off)	T. Uchida	Kurata	Usami	Kim	Lins	Yonekura
6	Vegalta Sendai	Higashiguchi	Oh	Fujiharu	Nishino	Iwashita	Abe (substituted off)	Kurata	Futagawa (substituted off)	T. Uchida	Lins (substituted off)	Usami	Yonekura	Omori	Okazaki
QF	Vissel Kobe	Higashiguchi	Yonekura	Oh	Nishino	Iwashita	Abe	Kurata (substituted off)	Endō	Konno	Patric (substituted off)	Usami (substituted off)	Lins	Myojin	Sato
QF	Vissel Kobe	Higashiguchi	Yonekura	Oh	Nishino	Iwashita	Abe (substituted off)	Kurata	Endō	Konno	Patric (substituted off)	Usami (substituted off)	Lins	Futagawa	Sato
SF	Kawasaki Frontale	Higashiguchi	Yonekura	Oh	Niwa	Iwashita	Abe (substituted off)	Omori	Endō	Konno	Patric (substituted off)	Usami (substituted off)	Kurata	Myojin	Sato
SF	Kawasaki Frontale	Higashiguchi	Yonekura	Oh	Niwa	Iwashita	Abe (substituted off)	Kurata	Endō	Konno	Patric (substituted off)	Usami (substituted off)	Kim	Omori	Sato
F	Sanfrecce Hiroshima	Higashiguchi	Yonekura	Oh	Niwa	Iwashita	Abe (substituted off)	Endō	Myojin (substituted off)	Konno	Patric	Usami (substituted off)	Lins	Kurata	Omori

(substituted on) = Substitute on, (substituted off) = Substitute Off, = Number of goals scored, = Yellow Card and = Red Card.

== Emperor's Cup results ==
Round	Date	Opponents	H / A	Result F–A	Scorers	Attendance
2	12 July 2014	Zweigen Kanazawa	H	5–1	Usami 11', Kurata 19', 56', 81', Nishino 38'	2,862
3	20 August 2014	Tokushima Vortis	H	1–0	Usami 28'	3,234
4	10 September 2014	Sanfrecce Hiroshima	A	3–1	Sato 31', 45', Lins 85'	3,056
QF	15 October 2014	Omiya Ardija	H	2–0	Futagawa 60', Sato 84'	3,604
SF	26 November 2014	Shimizu S-Pulse	N	5–2	Usami 9', 72', Patric 14', 37', Lins 85'	6,708
F	13 December 2014	Montedio Yamagata	N	3–1	Usami 4', 85', Patric 22'	47,829

=== Match day line-ups ===
Player Appearances – 2014 Emperor's Cup
Round	Opponent	GK	RB	LB	CB	CB	RM	LM	CM	CM	FW	FW	Substituted on	Substituted on	Substituted on
2	Zweigen Kanazawa	Higashiguchi	Yonekura	Oh	Nishino	Iwashita	Omori	Kurata	Endō (substituted off)	Konno (substituted off)	Lins (substituted off)	Usami	Abe	Sato	T. Uchida
3	Tokushima Vortis	Higashiguchi	Yonekura	Fujiharu	Niwa	Kim	Lins (substituted off)	Futagawa (substituted off)	Endō	Myojin	Sato	Usami (substituted off)	Kurata	Abe	Konno
4	Sanfrecce Hiroshima	Higashiguchi	Yonekura	Fujiharu	Niwa	Kim	Abe (substituted off)	Endō (substituted off)	Myojin	Konno	Sato (substituted off)	Lins	Kurata	Okazaki	Patric
QF	Omiya Ardija	Higashiguchi	Konno	Fujiharu	Niwa	Kim	Futagawa (substituted off)	Kurata	Myojin	T. Uchida (substituted off)	Sato (substituted off)	Lins	Omori	Oh	Okazaki
SF	Shimizu S-Pulse	Higashiguchi	Yonekura	Fujiharu	Niwa	Kim	Abe (substituted off)	Kurata	Endō	Konno	Patric (substituted off)	Usami (substituted off)	Lins	Omori	Sato
F	Montedio Yamagata	Higashiguchi	Oh	Fujiharu	Niwa	Iwashita (substituted off)	Omori (substituted off)	Kurata	Endō	Konno	Patric (substituted off)	Usami	Kim	Lins	Myojin

(substituted on) = Substitute on, (substituted off) = Substitute Off, = Number of goals scored, = Yellow Card and = Red Card.

== Squad statistics ==
No.	Pos.	Name	League		Emperor's Cup		J.League Cup		Total		Discipline	
No.	Pos.	Name	Apps	Goals	Apps	Goals	Apps	Goals	Apps	Goals	Yellow card	Red card
1	GK	(Japan) Masaaki Higashiguchi	34	0	6	0	10	0	50	0	2	0
2	DF	(Brazil) Evson	0	0	0	0	0(1)	0	0(1)	0	0	0
3	DF	(Japan) Takaharu Nishino	11(1)	1	1	1	8	1	20(1)	3	1	0
4	DF	(Japan) Hiroki Fujiharu	21(4)	0	5	0	4	0	30(4)	0	4	0
5	DF	(Japan) Daiki Niwa	23(2)	2	5	0	4(1)	0	32(3)	2	0	0
6	DF	(South Korea) Kim Jung-ya	2(2)	0	4(1)	0	2(2)	0	8(5)	0	1	0
7	MF	(Japan) Yasuhito Endō (c)	34	6	5	0	6	0	45	6	3	0
8	DF	(Japan) Keisuke Iwashita	32	1	2	0	8	0	42	1	8	1
9	FW	(Brazil) Lins	9(17)	5	4(2)	2	2(5)	1	15(24)	8	3	0
10	MF	(Japan) Takahiro Futagawa	6(13)	1	2	1	5(1)	0	13(14)	2	1	0
11	MF	(Japan) Shu Kurata	17(13)	6	4(2)	3	8(3)	2	29(18)	11	6	0
13	MF	(Japan) Hiroyuki Abe	27(3)	7	2(1)	0	9	3	38(4)	10	2	0
14	DF	(Japan) Koki Yonekura	17(4)	1	4	0	7(2)	2	28(6)	3	4	0
15	MF	(Japan) Yasuyuki Konno	31(2)	2	5(1)	0	7	0	43(3)	2	5	0
16	GK	(Japan) Kohei Kawata	0	0	0	0	1	0	1	0	0	0
17	MF	(Japan) Tomokazu Myojin	4(8)	0	3(1)	0	3(2)	0	10(11)	0	1	0
18	GK	(Japan) Atsushi Kimura	0	0	0	0	0	0	0	0	0	0
19	MF	(Japan) Kotaro Omori	17(7)	5	2(2)	0	4(4)	2	23(13)	7	0	0
20	FW	(Japan) Akihiro Sato	10(13)	2	3(2)	3	2(6)	1	15(21)	6	1	0
21	DF	(Japan) Akira Kaji	6	0	0	0	0	0	6	0	0	0
22	DF	(South Korea) Oh Jae-suk	24	0	2(1)	0	10	0	36(1)	0	5	0
23	DF	(Japan) Yuto Uchida	0	0	0	0	1	0	1	0	0	0
24	FW	(Japan) Naoki Ogawa	0	0	0	0	1(2)	1	1(2)	1	0	0
25	MF	(Japan) Kenya Okazaki	1(1)	0	0(2)	0	2(1)	0	3(4)	0	1	0
26	MF	(Japan) Yōsuke Ideguchi	0	0	0	0	2	0	2	0	0	0
27	MF	(Japan) Tatsuya Uchida	9(3)	0	1(1)	0	2(3)	0	12(7)	0	4	0
29	FW	(Brazil) Patric	16(3)	9	2(1)	3	5	3	23(4)	15	4	0
31	GK	(Japan) Ken Tajiri	0	0	0	0	0	0	0	0	0	0
34	MF	(Japan) Shota Yomesaka	0	0	0	0	0	0	0	0	0	0
36	MF	(Japan) Mizuki Ichimaru	0	0	0	0	0	0	0	0	0	0
37	FW	(Japan) Akito Takagi	0	0	0	0	1	0	1	0	0	0
39	FW	(Japan) Takashi Usami	23(3)	10	4	6	7	5	34(3)	21	3	0
—	—	Own goals	–	1	–	0	–	0	–	1	–	–

Statistics accurate as of end of 2014 season.
