= Oh Jae-suk =

South Korean footballer

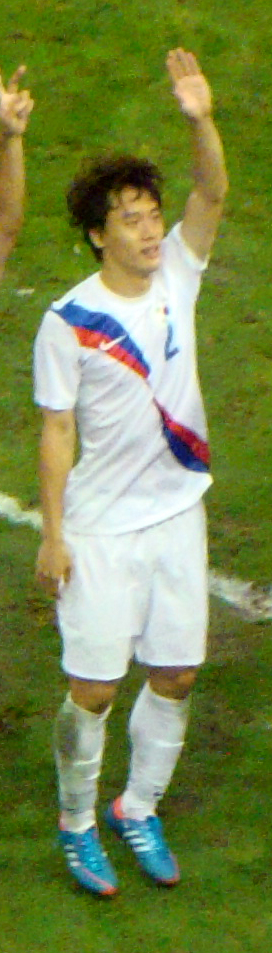

Personal information
- Full name: Oh Jae-suk
- Date of birth: 4 January 1990 (age 36)
- Place of birth: Uijeongbu, South Korea
- Height: 1.78 m (5 ft 10 in)
- Position: Full back

Team information
- Current team: Daejeon Hana Citizen
- Number: 22

Youth career
- 2005–2007: Singal High School
- 2008–2009: Kyung Hee University

Senior career*
Years	Team	Apps	(Gls)
2010–2011	Suwon Samsung Bluewings	5	(0)
2011	→ Gangwon FC (loan)	22	(1)
2012	Gangwon FC	31	(2)
2013–2020	Gamba Osaka	119	(0)
2016	→ Gamba Osaka U-23 (loan)	2	(0)
2019	→ FC Tokyo (loan)	12	(0)
2020	Nagoya Grampus	22	(0)
2021–2023	Incheon United	29	(0)
2023–	Daejeon Hana Citizen	58	(0)

International career^{‡}
2006–2007	South Korea U-17	15	(1)
2008–2009	South Korea U-20	15	(0)
2009–2012	South Korea U-23	21	(0)
2009	South Korea Universiade	6	(0)
2016–	South Korea	4	(0)
Medal record
Olympic Games
Bronze medal – third place	2012 London	Team
Asian Games
Bronze medal – third place	2010 Guangzhou	Team
- * Club domestic league appearances and goals as of 5 January 2026 ‡ National team caps and goals as of 7 October 2017

- Oh Jae-suk
- Hangul: 오재석
- Hanja: 吳宰碩
- RR: O Jaeseok
- MR: O Chaesŏk

Oh Jae-suk (Korean: 오재석; Korean pronunciation: [o.dʑɛ̝.sʌk̚] or [o] [tɕɛ̝.sʌk̚]; born 4 January 1990) is a South Korean football player who currently plays as full-back for Daejeon Hana Citizen.

He previously played for Suwon Samsung Bluewings and Gangwon FC in his homeland. He has also represented his country at full international level.

== Club career ==
Oh started out his professional career with Suwon Samsung Bluewings in 2010. He made just 5 league appearances before being loaned to Gangwon FC for the majority of the 2011 season. He played 22 matches and scored once as his side finished 16th and last in the final standings, however they retained their league status due to their being no relegation from the K-League that year. He signed for Gangwon permanently in 2012 and made 31 league appearances to help them to a 14th-place finish, just above the relegation spots.

In 2013 he joined, then J2 League side, Gamba Osaka who had been relegated from J1 League the previous season. His first year in Japan was spent largely as a reserve behind veteran right-back Akira Kaji and he made just 5 appearances as Gamba bounced back at the first time of asking, ending the season as J2 League champions.

2014 got even better for the men in blue and black as their return to J1 League saw them go on to win the domestic treble, lifting the J1 League title, the J.League Cup and the Emperor's Cup. Kaji departed for America before the season and Oh saw himself in competition with the newly acquired Koki Yonekura for the right-back position and Hiroki Fujiharu for the left-back slot. Due to a gruelling schedule, all 3 were rotated by coach Kenta Hasegawa throughout the year and Oh ended up making 37 appearances in all competitions.

Gamba retained their Emperor's Cup title in 2015 and added the Japanese Super Cup to their trophy cabinet, they also reached the semi-finals of the 2015 AFC Champions League before going down to Chinese outfit Guangzhou Evergrande over 2 legs. Oh didn't feature nearly as much as he had the previous year as Yonekura and Fujiharu locked down the starting berths, he played just 10 times in the league and 22 games in total. He was also red-carded in the league championship final play-off first leg at home to Sanfrecce Hiroshima. With Gamba leading 2–1 in the 86th minute, Oh was shown a straight red-card. They went on to concede injury time goals to Sho Sasaki and Yoshifumi Kashiwa and lost 3–2 before drawing the return leg 1-1 which led to a 4-3 aggregate defeat and Sanfrecce being crowned J League Champions.

There were to be no trophies for Gamba between 2016 and 2018, but Oh went on to feature regularly for them in that period despite fierce competition not only from Yonekura and Fujiharu but also from the up-and-coming Ryo Hatsuse. Oh played 18, 29 and 24 league games respectively across the 2016, 2017 and 2018 seasons as Gamba finished in 4th, 10th and 9th positions.

== International career ==
Oh played for the South Korean Olympic football team at the 2012 Summer Olympics, helping them to win the bronze medal.

He was called up to the senior South Korea team by Uli Stielike for a 2018 FIFA World Cup qualifier against Lebanon in March 2016, but had to withdraw through injury and was replaced by Kim Chang-soo.

== Career statistics ==
=== Club ===
As of match played 24 November 2024

Appearances and goals by club, season and competition
Club	Season	League			Cup		League Cup		Continental		Other^{1}		Total	
Club	Season	Division	Apps	Goals	Apps	Goals	Apps	Goals	Apps	Goals	Apps	Goals	Apps	Goals
Suwon Samsung Bluewings	2010	K League 1	5	0	3	0	2	0	2	0	—		12	0
Gangwon FC (loan)	2011	K League 1	22	1	3	0	2	0	—		—		27	1
Gangwon FC	2012	K League 1	31	2	0	0	0	0	0	0	—		31	2
Gangwon FC	Total		53	3	3	0	2	0	0	0	—		58	3
Gamba Osaka	2013	J2 League	5	0	0	0	—		—		—		5	0
Gamba Osaka	2014	J1 League	24	0	3	0	10	0	—		—		37	0
Gamba Osaka	2015	J1 League	10	0	1	0	3	0	4	0	4	0	22	0
Gamba Osaka	2016	J1 League	18	0	2	0	0	0	4	0	1	0	25	0
Gamba Osaka	2017	J1 League	29	0	1	0	2	0	7	0	—		39	0
Gamba Osaka	2018	J1 League	24	0	1	0	7	0	—		—		32	0
Gamba Osaka	2019	J1 League	8	0	0	0	4	0	—		—		12	0
Gamba Osaka	2020	J1 League	1	0	0	0	0	0	—		—		1	0
Gamba Osaka	Total		119	0	8	0	26	0	15	0	5	0	173	0
FC Tokyo (loan)	2019	J1 League	12	0	0	0	0	0	—		—		12	0
Nagoya Grampus	2020	J1 League	22	0	—		1	0	—		—		23	0
Incheon United	2021	K League 1	26	0	0	0	—		—		—		26	0
Incheon United	2022	K League 1	3	0	1	0	—		—		—		4	0
Incheon United	Total		29	0	1	0	—		—		—		30	0
Daejeon Hana Citizen	2023	K League 1	25	0	0	0	—		—		—		25	0
Daejeon Hana Citizen	2024	K League 1	21	0	1	0	—		—		—		22	0
Daejeon Hana Citizen	Total		46	0	1	0	—		—		—		47	0
Career total			286	3	16	0	31	0	17	0	5	0	355	3

^{1} includes J.League Championship, Japanese Super Cup and Suruga Bank Championship appearances.

=== International ===
As of match played 7 October 2017

Appearances and goals by national team and year
National team	Year	Apps	Goals
South Korea	2016	3	0
South Korea	2017	1	0
Career total		4	0

== Reserves performance ==
As of 11 February 2019

Club performance			League		Total	
Season	Club	League	Apps	Goals	Apps	Goals
Japan			League		Total	
2016	Gamba Osaka U-23	J3	2	0	2	0
Career total			2	0	2	0

== Honors ==
Gamba Osaka

- J.League Division 1 – 2014
- J.League Division 2 – 2013
- Emperor's Cup – 2014, 2015
- J.League Cup – 2014
- Japanese Super Cup – 2015
