= Keisuke Iwashita =

Japanese footballer (born 1986)

Keisuke Iwashita 岩下 敬輔
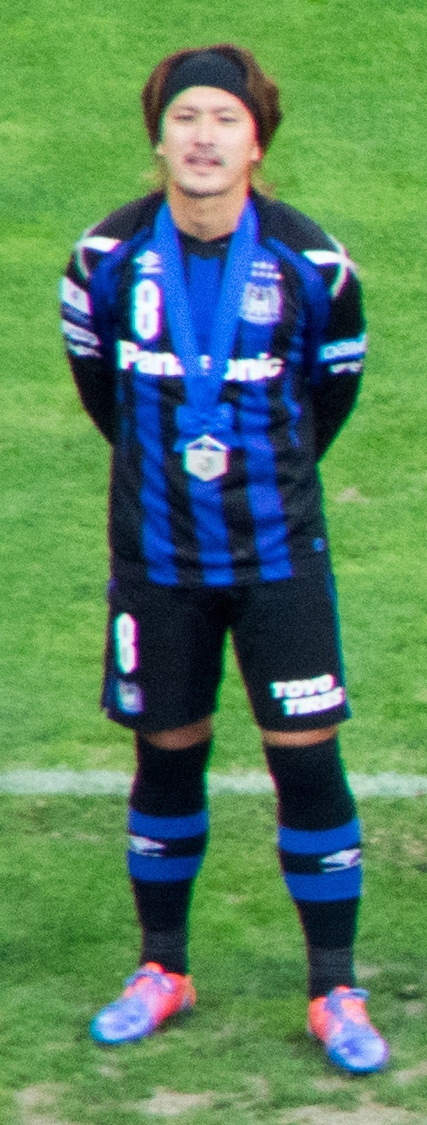

Personal information
- Full name: Keisuke Iwashita
- Date of birth: 24 September 1986 (age 40)
- Place of birth: Ijūin, Japan
- Height: 1.81 m (5 ft 11 in)
- Position: Centre-back

Youth career
- 2002–2004: Kagoshima Commercial High School

Senior career*
Years	Team	Apps	(Gls)
2005–2012	Shimizu S-Pulse	110	(11)
2012–2016	Gamba Osaka	95	(4)
2016	→ Gamba Osaka U-23 (loan)	6	(0)
2017–2019	Avispa Fukuoka	55	(4)
2019	→ Sagan Tosu (loan)	0	(0)
2020	Sagan Tosu	2	(0)
Medal record
Shimizu S-Pulse
Runner-up	J.League Cup	2008
Runner-up	J.League Cup	2012
Runner-up	Emperor's Cup	2005
Runner-up	Emperor's Cup	2010
Gamba Osaka
Winner	J1 League	2014
Runner-up	J1 League	2015
Winner	J.League Cup	2014
Runner-up	J.League Cup	2015
Runner-up	J.League Cup	2016
Winner	Emperor's Cup	2014
Winner	Emperor's Cup	2015
Runner-up	Emperor's Cup	2012
- * Club domestic league appearances and goals as of 19:10, 6 January 2021 (UTC)

Keisuke Iwashita (岩下 敬輔, Iwashita Keisuke; born 24 September 1986 in Kagoshima Prefecture) is a Japanese football defender who plays for J1 League team Sagan Tosu.

== Career ==
After graduating from Kagoshima Commercial High School in 2005, Iwashita signed for S-Pulse where he has played since. In 2007 he scored his first goal for S-Pulse in a 2–0 away victory at Albirex Niigata.

He received his first call-up for the senior national team in 2009 by Takeshi Okada but has yet to play a game for Japan.

== Career statistics ==
Updated to end of 2018 season.

Appearances and goals by club, season and competition
Club	Season	League			Emperor's Cup		League Cup		AFC		Other^{1}		Total	
Club	Season	Division	Apps	Goals	Apps	Goals	Apps	Goals	Apps	Goals	Apps	Goals	Apps	Goals
Shimizu S-Pulse	2006	J1 League	1	0	0	0	0	0	—		—		1	0
Shimizu S-Pulse	2007	J1 League	1	0	0	0	2	0	—		—		0	0
Shimizu S-Pulse	2008	J1 League	18	2	0	0	10	2	—		—		28	4
Shimizu S-Pulse	2009	J1 League	29	5	0	0	9	1	—		—		38	6
Shimizu S-Pulse	2010	J1 League	20	1	2	0	5	0	—		—		27	1
Shimizu S-Pulse	2011	J1 League	29	2	4	1	4	0	—		—		37	3
Shimizu S-Pulse	2012	J1 League	12	1	0	0	2	0	—		—		14	1
Gamba Osaka	2012	J1 League	12	0	6	1	0	0	—		—		18	1
Gamba Osaka	2013	J2 League	17	2	0	0	—		—		—		17	2
Gamba Osaka	2014	J1 League	32	1	2	0	8	0	—		—		42	1
Gamba Osaka	2015	J1 League	24	0	0	0	5	1	9	0	2	0	40	1
Gamba Osaka	2016	J1 League	10	1	1	0	1	0	1	0	0	0	13	1
Avispa Fukuoka	2017	J2 League	32	3	0	0	—		—		—		32	3
Avispa Fukuoka	2018	J2 League	23	1	0	0	—		—		—		23	1
Career total			260	19	15	2	46	4	10	0	2	0	333	25

^{1} includes J. League Championship, Japanese Super Cup and Suruga Bank Championship appearances.

Reserves performance

Appearances and goals by club, season and competition
Club	Season	League			Total	
Club	Season	Division	Apps	Goals	Apps	Goals
Gamba Osaka U-23	2016	J3	6	0	6	0
Career total			6	0	6	0

== Honors ==
Gamba Osaka

- J. League Division 1 - 2014
- J. League Division 2 - 2013
- Emperor's Cup - 2014, 2015
- J. League Cup - 2014
- Japanese Super Cup - 2015
