= Kotaro Omori =

Japanese footballer

Kotaro Omori 大森 晃太郎
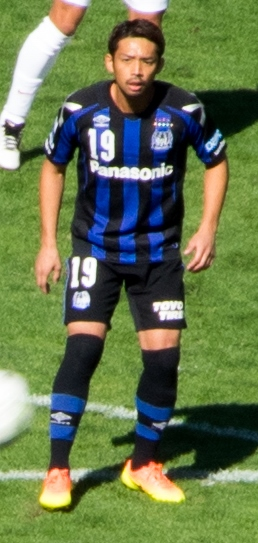

Personal information
- Full name: Kotaro Omori
- Date of birth: April 28, 1992 (age 34)
- Place of birth: Yodogawa-ku, Osaka, Japan
- Height: 1.70 m (5 ft 7 in)
- Positions: Attacking midfielder; winger

Team information
- Current team: Suphanburi
- Number: 33

Youth career
- 2002−2004: Osaka Central FC
- 2005−2010: Gamba Osaka

Senior career*
Years	Team	Apps	(Gls)
2011−2016	Gamba Osaka	100	(12)
2016	→ Gamba Osaka U-23 (loan)	2	(0)
2017	Vissel Kobe	26	(4)
2018	FC Tokyo U-23	1	(0)
2018–2019	FC Tokyo	57	(2)
2020–2025	Júbilo Iwata	108	(7)
2024	→ Muangthong United (loan)	8	(1)
2024	→ Kamatamare Sanuki (loan)	1	(0)
2025–	Suphanburi	17	(4)
Medal record
Gamba Osaka
Winner	J1 League	2014
Runner-up	J1 League	2015
Winner	J.League Cup	2014
Runner-up	J.League Cup	2015
Runner-up	J.League Cup	2016
Winner	Emperor's Cup	2014
Winner	Emperor's Cup	2015
Runner-up	Emperor's Cup	2012
- * Club domestic league appearances and goals as of 13 March 2026 (UTC)

Kotaro Omori (大森 晃太郎, Ōmori Kōtarō; born April 28, 1992) is a Japanese professional footballer who plays as an attacking midfielder or a winger for Thai League 3 club Suphanburi.

== Club statistics ==
Last update: 2 December 2018.

Club performance			League		Cup		League Cup		Continental		Other		Total	
Season	Club	League	Apps	Goals	Apps	Goals	Apps	Goals	Apps	Goals	Apps	Goals	Apps	Goals
Japan			League		Emperor's Cup		League Cup		AFC		Other^{1}		Total	
2011	Gamba Osaka	J1 League	1	0	1	0	0	0	0	0	-		2	0
2012	Gamba Osaka	J1 League	4	0	2	0	0	0	1	0	-		7	0
2013	Gamba Osaka	J2 League	16	1	2	0	-		-		-		18	1
2014	Gamba Osaka	J1 League	24	5	4	0	8	2	-		-		36	7
2015	Gamba Osaka	J1 League	30	3	1	1	5	1	7	1	5	0	48	6
2016	Gamba Osaka	J1 League	25	3	1	0	5	0	3	0	0	0	34	3
Total			100	12	11	1	18	3	11	1	5	0	145	17
2017	Vissel Kobe	J1 League	26	4	3	1	5	0	-		-		34	5
Total			26	4	3	1	5	0	-		-		34	5
2018	FC Tokyo	J1 League	32	1	3	0	1	0	-		-		36	1
Total			32	1	3	0	1	0	-		-		36	1
Career Total			158	17	17	2	24	3	11	1	5	0	181	22

^{1} includes J. League Championship, Japanese Super Cup and Suruga Bank Championship appearances.

== Reserves performance ==
Last Update:25 February 2019

Club performance			League		Total	
Season	Club	League	Apps	Goals	Apps	Goals
Japan			League		Total	
2016	Gamba Osaka U-23	J3 League	2	0	2	0
2018	FC Tokyo U-23	J3 League	1	0	1	0
Career total			3	0	3	0

== Honors ==
- J. League Division 1 - 2014
- J. League Division 2 - 2013
- Emperor's Cup - 2014, 2015
- J. League Cup - 2014
- Japanese Super Cup - 2015
