= Adi Rocha =

Brazilian footballer (born 1985)

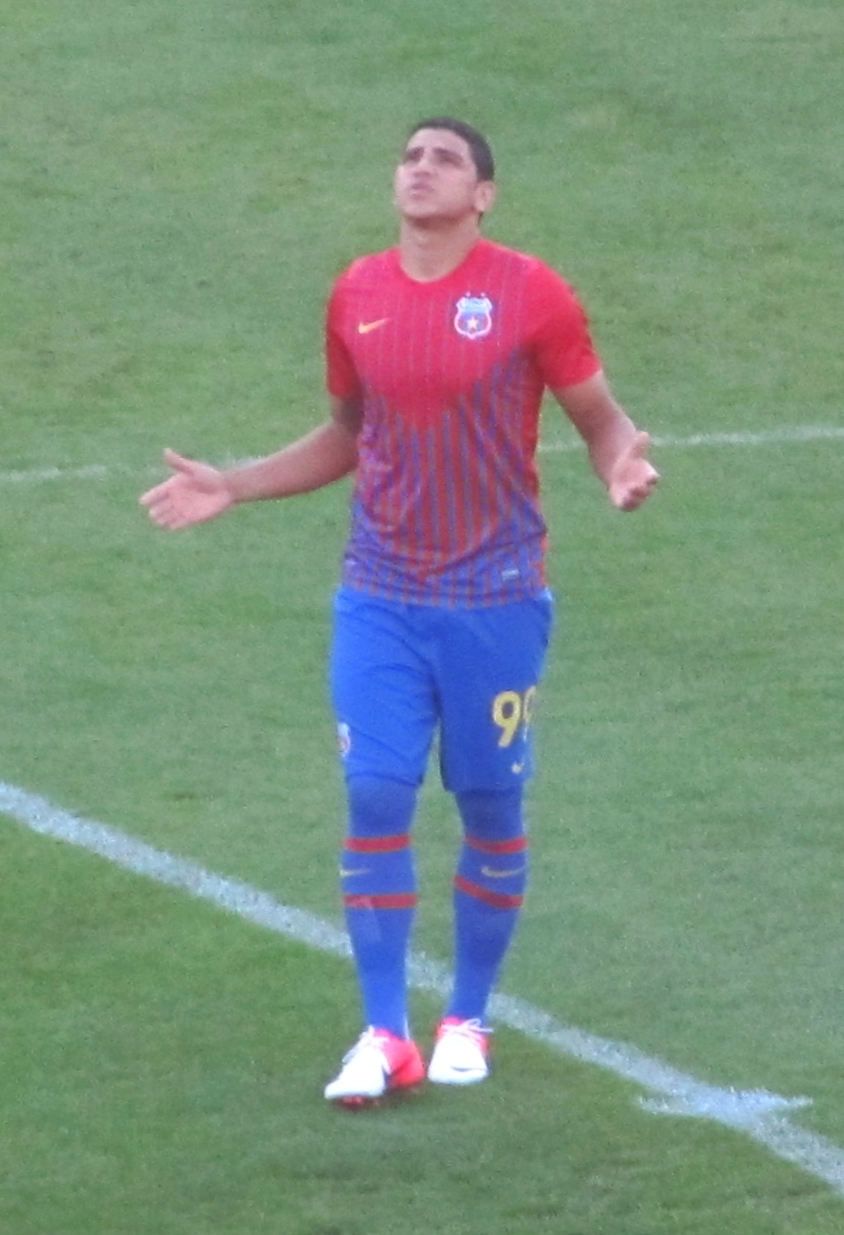
- Adi Rocha in 2012

Personal information
- Full name: Adi Rocha Sobrinho Filho
- Date of birth: 15 December 1985 (age 40)
- Place of birth: Riachão, Maranhão, Brazil
- Height: 1.84 m (6 ft 0 in)
- Position: Striker

Youth career
- 1995–2006: Inter de Limeira

Senior career*
Years	Team	Apps	(Gls)
2002–2007	Nacional Atlético Clube	19	(2)
2007–2008	LASK Linz	19	(2)
2008–2009	Austria Kärnten	16	(10)
2009–2011	Energie Cottbus	1	(0)
2012	Concordia Chiajna	15	(8)
2012–2013	FCSB	16	(9)
2013	Gamba Osaka	13	(9)
2014–2015	Žalgiris Vilnius	3	(3)
2015–2016	Jiangxi Liansheng	29	(11)
Total		131	(54)
- * Club domestic league appearances and goals

Adi Rocha Sobrinho Filho (born 15 December 1985), commonly known as Adi Rocha or simply Adi, is a Brazilian former professional footballer who played as a striker.

== Club career ==
Adi was born in Riachão, Maranhão.

=== Energie Cottbus ===
Adi transferred to Energie Cottbus from Austria Kärnten in the 2009 winter transfer window after scoring 10 goals in 17 games. After he was injured in his first match in the Bundesliga, Adi was not able to play anymore due to a severe injury (persistent cartilage damage). After being sidelined for two years, his contract was terminated at the end of the 2010–11 season.

=== Concordia Chiajna ===
Adi went to Liga I side Concordia Chiajna to restart his career. Not being held back by knee problems, he had a great spell at Chiajna, scoring eight goals from 15 games, to help his team avoid relegation to Liga II.

=== FCSB ===
In May 2012, Adi was brought to FCSB by his former Concordia Chiajna manager Laurențiu Reghecampf. On 23 July, he made his first appearance for FCSB in a game against his former team Concordia Chiajna which ended in a 1–0 victory for the Bucharest team. He scored his first goal a week later against Astra Ploiești in a dramatic game that ended with the 4–3 victory of his team. On 30 August, he scored two goals against Ekranas in the Europa League play-off, to secure FCSB their presence in the group stages.

=== Žalgiris Vilnius ===
In July 2014, he signed with Žalgiris Vilnius.

== Career statistics ==
Appearances and goals by club, season and competition
Club	Season	League			Cup		Europe		Total	
Club	Season	Division	Apps	Goals	Apps	Goals	Apps	Goals	Apps	Goals
Nacional Atlético Clube	2007	Série B	19	2	0	0	0	0	19	2
LASK Linz	2007–08	Austrian Bundesliga	19	2	0	0	0	0	19	2
Austria Kärnten	2008–09	Austrian Bundesliga	16	10	1	0	0	0	17	10
Energie Cottbus	2008–09	Bundesliga	1	0	0	0	0	0	1	0
Energie Cottbus	2009–10	2. Bundesliga	0	0	0	0	0	0	0	0
Energie Cottbus	2010–11	2. Bundesliga	0	0	0	0	0	0	0	0
Energie Cottbus	Total		1	0	0	0	0	0	1	0
Concordia Chiajna	2011–12	Liga I	15	8	0	0	0	0	15	8
FCSB	2012–13	Liga I	16	9	1	0	10	3	27	12
Gamba Osaka	2013	J.League Division 2	13	9			0	0	13	9
Žalgiris Vilnius	2014	A Lyga	3	3			0	0	3	3
Jiangxi Liansheng	2015	China League One	29	11	2	5	0	0	31	16
Career total			131	54	4	5	10	3	145	62

== Honours ==
FCSB

- Romanian Championship League: 2012–13

Gamba Osaka

- J2 League: 2013

Žalgiris Vilnius

- Lithuanian Championship: 2014
