= Hiroki Fujiharu =

Japanese footballer

Hiroki Fujiharu 藤春 廣輝
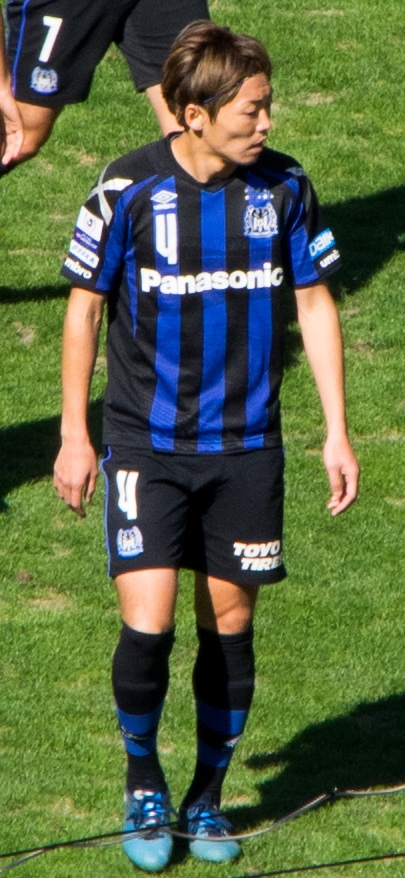

Personal information
- Full name: Hiroki Fujiharu
- Date of birth: November 28, 1988 (age 37)
- Place of birth: Higashiōsaka, Osaka, Japan
- Height: 1.75 m (5 ft 9 in)
- Position: Left back

Team information
- Current team: FC Ryukyu
- Number: 4

Youth career
- Kusaka SS
- 2001−2003: EXE'90 FC
- 2004−2006: Tokai Univ. Osaka Gyosei High School

College career
Years	Team	Apps	(Gls)
2007−2010	Osaka University H&SS		

Senior career*
Years	Team	Apps	(Gls)
2011−2024	Gamba Osaka	313	(12)
2024−	FC Ryukyu	75	(1)

International career
2016	Japan Olympic (O.P.)	2	(0)
2015	Japan	3	(0)
Medal record
Gamba Osaka
Winner	J1 League	2014
Runner-up	J1 League	2015
Winner	J.League Cup	2014
Runner-up	J.League Cup	2015
Runner-up	J.League Cup	2016
Winner	Emperor's Cup	2014
Winner	Emperor's Cup	2015
Runner-up	Emperor's Cup	2012
- * Club domestic league appearances and goals as of 25 August 2026

Hiroki Fujiharu (藤春 廣輝, Fujiharu Hiroki; born November 28, 1988) is a Japanese football player. He plays as a left back for FC Ryukyu in J3 League.

== Club career ==
Born and raised in Osaka, Fujiharu joined local club Gamba Osaka in 2011 after graduating from the Osaka University of Health and Sport Sciences. He only played 11 league games during his debut campaign but went on to make the left-back position his own in 2012. He played all 34 league matches that year, however it was not a successful one for his club as they found themselves relegated to J2 League after finishing in 17th place.

Fujiharu was once again an ever present at left back in 2013 and notched a career high total of 4 goals throughout the year as Gamba bounced back at the first time of asking, finishing the season as league champions. Things got even better in 2014 with Gamba completing the domestic treble; winning the league, J.League Cup and Emperor's Cup. Fujiharu played 25 league matches and 34 games in total as he rotated the left-back position with Korean full-back Oh Jae-suk.

2015 saw Gamba lift the Japanese Super Cup and Emperor's Cup, defeating Urawa Red Diamonds in both matches. They also reached the semi-finals of the AFC Champions League before going down to Chinese side Guangzhou Evergrande over 2 legs. Fujiharu played a career high 54 games across all competitions in 2015.

Gamba failed to add any silverware to their trophy cabinet between 2016 and 2018, however Fujiharu was by now fully established as his club's first choice in the left back position. He only missed 6 league games across the 2016 and 2017 seasons before a short spell out with injury in 2018 restricted him to just 25 league appearances.

== National team career ==
Fujiharu received his first call up to the Japan national team in March 2015 and made his debut in a 2–0 home victory over Tunisia on March 27. Later on in the year he was part of the squad which competed in the 2015 EAFF East Asian Cup. He played once in the 2–1 defeat to North Korea on August 2. His final international involvement that year came in a World Cup qualifier away to Cambodia on November 17. He started and played the full 90 minutes in a 2–0 away victory.

In August 2016, he was selected in the Japan Under-23 squad for the 2016 Summer Olympics. At this tournament, he played 2 matches at left back as Japan were eliminated in the group stages after finishing 3rd in Group B.

== Career statistics ==
=== Club ===
As of match played 24 November 2024

Appearances and goals by club, season and competition
Club	Season	League			Cup		League Cup		Continental		Other		Total	
Club	Season	Division	Apps	Goals	Apps	Goals	Apps	Goals	Apps	Goals	Apps	Goals	Apps	Goals
Gamba Osaka	2011	J1 League	11	1	2	0	0	0	1	0	—		14	1
Gamba Osaka	2012	J1 League	34	1	5	0	2	0	5	0	—		46	1
Gamba Osaka	2013	J2 League	42	4	2	0	—		—		—		44	4
Gamba Osaka	2014	J1 League	25	0	5	0	4	0	—		—		34	0
Gamba Osaka	2015	J1 League	32	0	2	0	4	1	11	0	5	1	54	2
Gamba Osaka	2016	J1 League	29	2	2	0	5	0	5	0	1	0	42	2
Gamba Osaka	2017	J1 League	33	2	3	0	4	0	7	0	—		47	2
Gamba Osaka	2018	J1 League	25	0	1	0	5	0	—		—		31	0
Gamba Osaka	2019	J1 League	17	2	0	0	5	0	—		—		22	2
Gamba Osaka	2020	J1 League	26	0	2	0	1	0	—		—		29	0
Gamba Osaka	2021	J1 League	19	0	1	0	2	0	2	0	1	0	25	0
Gamba Osaka	2022	J1 League	26	0	2	0	1	0	—		—		29	0
Gamba Osaka	2023	J1 League	2	0	1	0	3	0	—		—		6	0
Gamba Osaka	Total		313	12	28	1	39	2	31	0	7	1	418	16
FC Ryukyu	2024	J3 League	35	0	—		3	0	—		—		38	0
Career total			348	12	28	1	42	2	31	0	7	1	456	16

=== International ===
As of match played 4 February 2019

Japan national team
Year	Apps	Goals
2015	3	0
Total	3	0

== Honors ==
Gamba Osaka

- J. League Division 1 - 2014
- J. League Division 2 - 2013
- Emperor's Cup - 2014, 2015
- J. League Cup - 2014
- Japanese Super Cup - 2015
