= Kenya Okazaki =

Japanese footballer

Kenya Okazaki 岡﨑建哉
Personal information
- Full name: Kenya Okazaki
- Date of birth: 31 May 1990 (age 36)
- Place of birth: Fukuyama, Hiroshima, Japan
- Height: 1.75 m (5 ft 9 in)
- Position: Midfielder

Team information
- Current team: Montedio Yamagata
- Number: 7

Youth career
- 2009−2012: Kansai University

Senior career*
Years	Team	Apps	(Gls)
2013−2016	Gamba Osaka	24	(2)
2015	→ Ehime FC (loan)	20	(2)
2016	→ Gamba Osaka U-23 (loan)	19	(2)
2017–2018	Tochigi SC	61	(1)
2019–	Montedio Yamagata	65	(1)
Medal record
Gamba Osaka
Winner	J1 League	2014
Winner	J.League Cup	2014
Runner-up	J.League Cup	2016
Winner	Emperor's Cup	2014
- * Club domestic league appearances and goals as of 20:46, 31 August 2023

Kenya Okazaki (岡﨑 建哉, Okazaki Ken'ya) is a Japanese football player who currently plays for Montedio Yamagata in the J2 League

== Club statistics ==
As of 26 July 2022

Appearances and goals by club, season and competition
Club	Season	League			Emperor's Cup		League Cup		Total	
Club	Season	Division	Apps	Goals	Apps	Goals	Apps	Goals	Apps	Goals
Kansai University	2009	–	–		2	0	–		2	0
Kansai University	2012	–	–		2	0	–		2	0
Gamba Osaka	2013	J2 League	22	2	0	0	–		22	2
Gamba Osaka	2014	J1 League	2	0	2	0	3	0	7	0
Ehime FC	2015	J2 League	20	2	0	0	–		20	2
Gamba Osaka	2016	J1 League	0	0	0	0	0	0	0	0
Tochigi SC	2017	J3 League	27	1	0	0	–		27	1
Tochigi SC	2018	J2 League	34	0	0	0	–		34	0
Montedio Yamagata	2019	J2 League	5	0	0	0	–		5	0
Montedio Yamagata	2020	J2 League	27	1	–		–		27	1
Montedio Yamagata	2021	J2 League	19	0	0	0	–		19	0
Montedio Yamagata	2022	J2 League	3	0	0	0	–		3	0
Career total			159	6	6	0	3	0	168	6

Reserves performance

Appearances and goals by club, season and competition
Club	Season	League			Total	
Club	Season	Division	Apps	Goals	Apps	Goals
Gamba Osaka U-23	2016	J3	19	2	19	2
Career total			19	2	19	2

== Honors ==
Gamba Osaka

- J. League Division 1 - 2014
- J. League Division 2 - 2013
- Emperor's Cup - 2014
- J. League Cup - 2014
