= Paulinho (footballer, born 1982) =

Brazilian footballer

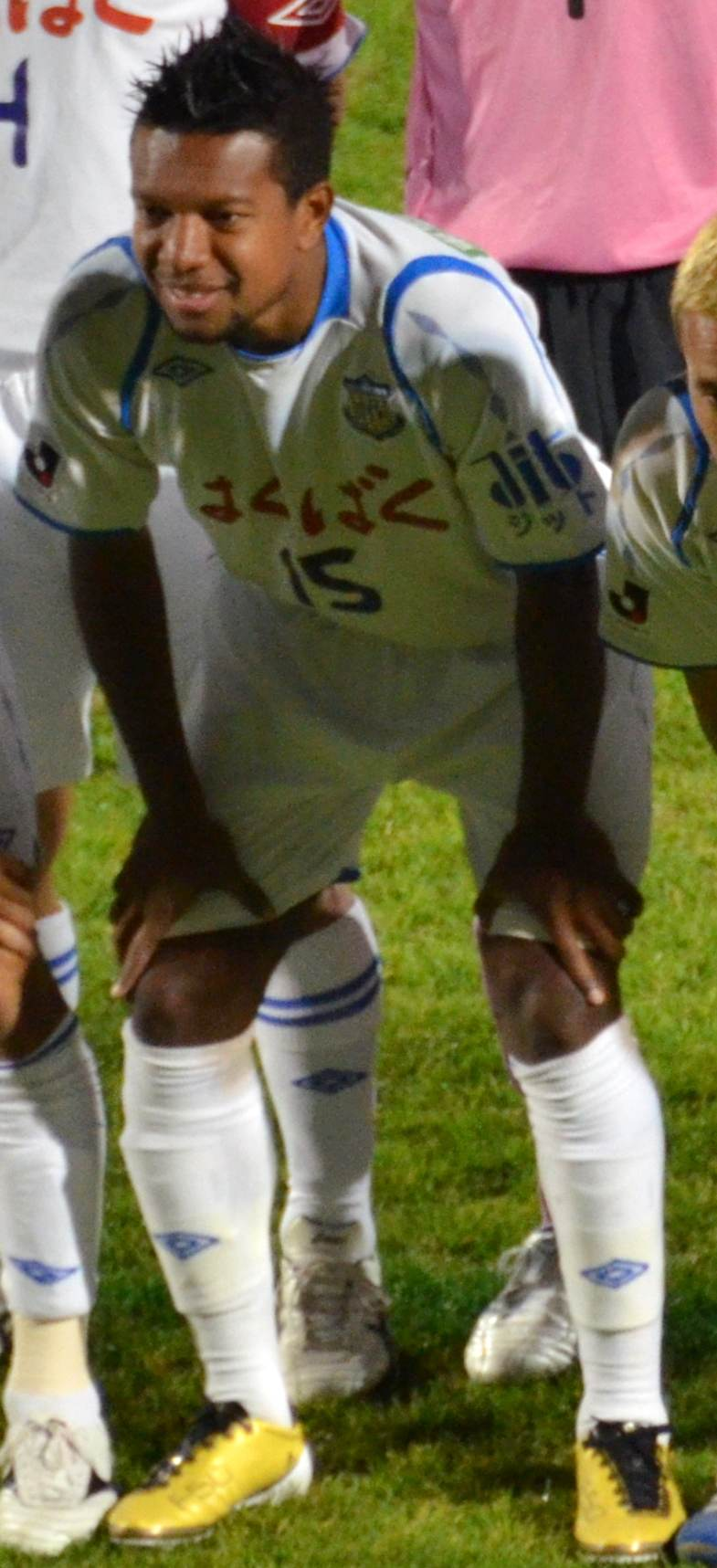

Personal information
- Full name: Paulo Antonio de Oliveira
- Date of birth: 16 July 1982 (age 44)
- Place of birth: Cuiabá, Brazil
- Height: 1.68 m (5 ft 6 in)
- Position: Striker

Team information
- Current team: Oita Trinita
- Number: 11

Senior career*
Years	Team	Apps	(Gls)
2001–2004	Atlético Mineiro	56	(11)
2004	Al-Ahli		
2004	Dorados de Sinaloa	13	(4)
2005–2009	Kyoto Sanga FC	127	(66)
2009	Sport Recife	4	(1)
2010–2011	Ventforet Kofu	61	(24)
2012–2013	Gamba Osaka	40	(14)
2015–	Oita Trinita	2	(1)
- * Club domestic league appearances and goals as of 23 February 2016

Paulo Antonio de Oliveira (パウリーニョ, born 16 July 1982), or simply Paulinho was a Brazilian football striker. His last game was for Oita Trinita.

== Career ==
He started his career at Atlético Mineiro and was selected in Brazilian U-23 team in 2004. In 2005, he became the top scorer in J2 League with 22 goals. On 31 August 2009 Sport Club do Recife have signed the Brazilian forward from Japanese club Kyoto Sanga F.C.

== Club career statistics ==
Updated to 23 February 2016.

Club performance			League		Cup		League Cup		Continental		Total	
Season	Club	League	Apps	Goals	Apps	Goals	Apps	Goals	Apps	Goals	Apps	Goals
Brazil			League		Copa do Brasil		League Cup		Copa Libertadores		Total	
2001	Atlético Mineiro	Série A	0	0					-		0	0
2002	Atlético Mineiro	Série A	19	5					-		19	5
2003	Atlético Mineiro	Série A	30	6					-		30	6
2004	Atlético Mineiro	Série A	7	0					-		7	0
Saudi Arabia			League		Crown Prince Cup		League Cup		AFC		Total	
2004/05	Al-Ahli Jeddah	Professional League							-		?	?
Mexico			League		Cup		League Cup		CONCACAF		Total	
2004/05	Dorados Sinaloa	Primera División	13	4					-		13	4
Japan			League		Emperor's Cup		J. League Cup		AFC		Total	
2005	Kyoto Purple Sanga	J2 League	32	22	0	0	-		-		32	22
2006	Kyoto Purple Sanga	J1 League	31	14	1	1	6	1	-		38	16
2007	Kyoto Sanga	J2 League	43	24	0	0	-		-		43	24
2008	Kyoto Sanga	J1 League	4	1	0	0	1	0	-		5	1
2009	Kyoto Sanga	J1 League	17	5	0	0	4	0	-		21	5
Brazil			League		Copa do Brasil		League Cup		Copa Libertadores		Total	
2009	Sport Recife	Série A	4	1					-		4	1
Japan			League		Emperor's Cup		J. League Cup		AFC		Total	
2010	Ventforet Kofu	J2 League	33	14	1	0	-		-		34	14
2011	Ventforet Kofu	J1 League	28	10	1	1	2	0	-		31	11
2012	Gamba Osaka	J1 League	21	8	2	0	1	0	3	0	28	11
2013	Gamba Osaka	J2 League	19	6	0	0	-		-		19	6
2015	Oita Trinita	J2 League	2	1	0	0	-		-		2	1
Country	Brazil		60	12					-		60	12
Country	Saudi Arabia								-			
Country	Mexico		13	4					-		13	4
Country	Japan		230	105	5	2	14	1	3	0	253	111
Total			300	121	5	2	14	1	3	0	323	127
