= 2018 Tokyo Verdy season =

Tokyo Verdy
2018 season
- Manager: Miguel Ángel Lotina
- Stadium: Ajinomoto Stadium
- J2 League: 6th
Home colours	Away colours

2018 Tokyo Verdy season.

== J2 League ==
Match	Date	Team	Score	Team	Venue	Attendance
1	2018.02.25	Tokyo Verdy	2-1	JEF United Chiba	Ajinomoto Stadium	9,400
2	2018.03.03	Ventforet Kofu	0-0	Tokyo Verdy	Yamanashi Chuo Bank Stadium	10,192
3	2018.03.11	Tokyo Verdy	2-1	Matsumoto Yamaga FC	Ajinomoto Stadium	8,812
4	2018.03.17	Oita Trinita	0-0	Tokyo Verdy	Oita Bank Dome	6,297
5	2018.03.21	Tokyo Verdy	1-1	Avispa Fukuoka	Ajinomoto Stadium	3,048
6	2018.03.25	Tokyo Verdy	0-0	Montedio Yamagata	Ajinomoto Stadium	4,336
7	2018.04.01	Tokushima Vortis	0-4	Tokyo Verdy	Pocarisweat Stadium	5,303
8	2018.04.07	Tokyo Verdy	0-0	FC Gifu	Ajinomoto Stadium	3,169
9	2018.04.15	Roasso Kumamoto	0-0	Tokyo Verdy	Egao Kenko Stadium	10,011
10	2018.04.21	Tokyo Verdy	3-0	Mito HollyHock	Ajinomoto Field Nishigaoka	3,726
11	2018.04.28	Omiya Ardija	2-0	Tokyo Verdy	NACK5 Stadium Omiya	9,927
12	2018.05.03	Tokyo Verdy	1-4	FC Machida Zelvia	Ajinomoto Stadium	6,505
13	2018.05.06	Tokyo Verdy	0-1	Zweigen Kanazawa	Ajinomoto Stadium	5,587
14	2018.05.12	Renofa Yamaguchi FC	4-3	Tokyo Verdy	Ishin Me-Life Stadium	4,893
16	2018.05.26	Tokyo Verdy	0-0	Ehime FC	Ajinomoto Stadium	4,125
17	2018.06.03	Yokohama FC	2-2	Tokyo Verdy	NHK Spring Mitsuzawa Football Stadium	8,038
18	2018.06.10	Albirex Niigata	1-2	Tokyo Verdy	Denka Big Swan Stadium	14,653
19	2018.06.16	Tokyo Verdy	3-1	Kyoto Sanga FC	Ajinomoto Stadium	4,463
20	2018.06.23	Tokyo Verdy	3-0	Tochigi SC	Ajinomoto Stadium	4,446
15	2018.06.27	Fagiano Okayama	0-1	Tokyo Verdy	City Light Stadium	6,709
21	2018.06.30	Kamatamare Sanuki	3-1	Tokyo Verdy	Pikara Stadium	2,860
22	2018.07.07	Tokyo Verdy	0-1	Fagiano Okayama	Ajinomoto Stadium	6,792
23	2018.07.15	Tokyo Verdy	3-1	Renofa Yamaguchi FC	Ajinomoto Stadium	5,712
24	2018.07.21	Avispa Fukuoka	0-0	Tokyo Verdy	Level5 Stadium	7,294
25	2018.07.25	Tokyo Verdy	4-3	Albirex Niigata	Ajinomoto Stadium	4,534
26	2018.07.29	Kyoto Sanga FC	0-1	Tokyo Verdy	Kyoto Nishikyogoku Athletic Stadium	4,337
27	2018.08.04	Tokyo Verdy	2-1	Omiya Ardija	Ajinomoto Stadium	5,350
28	2018.08.11	Montedio Yamagata	2-1	Tokyo Verdy	ND Soft Stadium Yamagata	13,609
29	2018.08.18	Tokyo Verdy	0-0	Oita Trinita	Ajinomoto Stadium	9,214
30	2018.08.25	JEF United Chiba	2-3	Tokyo Verdy	Fukuda Denshi Arena	11,287
31	2018.09.01	Zweigen Kanazawa	0-1	Tokyo Verdy	Ishikawa Athletics Stadium	3,832
32	2018.09.08	Tokyo Verdy	2-1	Yokohama FC	Ajinomoto Stadium	7,013
33	2018.09.16	Tokyo Verdy	2-2	Roasso Kumamoto	Ajinomoto Stadium	5,560
34	2018.09.23	FC Gifu	1-1	Tokyo Verdy	Gifu Nagaragawa Stadium	12,045
35	2018.09.30	Tochigi SC	0-1	Tokyo Verdy	Tochigi Green Stadium	3,950
36	2018.10.06	Tokyo Verdy	0-1	Ventforet Kofu	Ajinomoto Stadium	6,460
37	2018.10.14	Mito HollyHock	0-1	Tokyo Verdy	K's denki Stadium Mito	4,100
38	2018.10.21	Tokyo Verdy	2-1	Tokushima Vortis	Ajinomoto Stadium	5,873
39	2018.10.28	Ehime FC	2-2	Tokyo Verdy	Ningineer Stadium	3,594
40	2018.11.04	Matsumoto Yamaga FC	1-0	Tokyo Verdy	Sunpro Alwin	16,775
41	2018.11.11	Tokyo Verdy	1-0	Kamatamare Sanuki	Ajinomoto Stadium	10,529
42	2018.11.17	FC Machida Zelvia	1-1	Tokyo Verdy	Machida Stadium	10,013

== See also ==
- History of Tokyo Verdy
