= Riachão, Maranhão =

Coordinates: 7°21′43″S 46°37′01″W

- Municipality
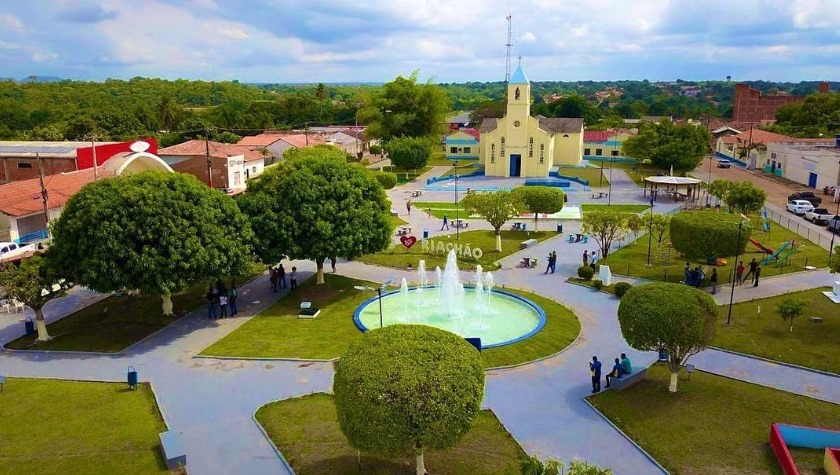
- Praça da Família
- Interactive map of Riachão, Maranhão
- Country: Brazil
- Region: Nordeste
- State: Maranhão
- Mesoregion: Sul Maranhense

Population (2020)
  - Total: 20,334
- Time zone: UTC−3 (BRT)

Riachão, Maranhão is a municipality in the state of Maranhão in the Northeast region of Brazil.

== See also ==
- List of municipalities in Maranhão
