= Shoki Hirai =

Japanese footballer

Shoki Hirai 平井 将生
Personal information
- Full name: Shoki Hirai
- Date of birth: 4 December 1987 (age 38)
- Place of birth: Tokushima, Japan
- Height: 1.79 m (5 ft 10 in)
- Position: Striker

Team information
- Current team: FC Maruyasu Okazaki
- Number: 14

Youth career
- 2003–2005: Gamba Osaka Youth

Senior career*
Years	Team	Apps	(Gls)
2006–2013	Gamba Osaka	90	(31)
2012	→ Albirex Niigata (loan)	21	(0)
2014–2016	Avispa Fukuoka	88	(7)
2017–2018	Giravanz Kitakyushu	27	(2)
2018	→ FC Maruyasu Okazaki (loan)	8	(0)
2019–	FC Maruyasu Okazaki	27	(7)

International career^{‡}
2007	Japan U-20	1	(0)
Medal record
Gamba Osaka
Winner	AFC Champions League	2008
Runner-up	J1 League	2010
Winner	J.League Cup	2007
Winner	Emperor's Cup	2008
Winner	Emperor's Cup	2009
Runner-up	Emperor's Cup	2006
- * Club domestic league appearances and goals as of 23 February 2020 ‡ National team caps and goals as of 14 January 2012

Shoki Hirai (平井 将生, Hirai Shōki; born 4 December 1987 in Tokushima) is a Japanese footballer for FC Maruyasu Okazaki.

== Club career ==
=== Gamba Osaka ===
Hirai was born in Tokushima, Shikoku region, and began his career playing for his local club Kamihachiman SC before moving to a higher level joining Premiere SC in 2000.

At the age of 15, he was invited to attend Gamba Osaka youth academy. After spending three years there, Hirai signed his first professional contract with Gamba on 6 December 2005. He was, along with fellow player Michihiro Yasuda, promoted to the senior squad and assigned the number 34 shirt. He made his professional debut on 9 December 2006 in the Emperor's Cup 4th round match against Sanfrecce Hiroshima. The following season, Hirai took over the number 14 shirt, previously worn by Akihiro Ienaga.

In the 2008 season, Hirai playing time increased significantly as he appeared in 8 league matches. He made his J. League debut on 27 April 2008 against Vissel Kobe coming on as a substitute in the 80th minute. After making a few substitute appearances, he made his first league start on 26 July 2008 in a 1–0 defaut Oita Trinita playing 45 minutes. Hirai scored his first professional goal on 2 July 2008 in a J. League Cup match against Yokohama F. Marinos, which proved to be the winner as Gamba won the match 1–0. During the season, he signed new five-year contract.

Hirai had arguably one of the best seasons of his career in the 2010 season. He appeared in 31 total matches scoring a career-high 20 goals. On 23 March 2010, Hirai scored first career hat-trick against Singapore Armed Forces in the AFC Champions League. He was later named Man of the match for this performance, which led to a 4–2 victory.

=== Albirex Niigata ===
On 12 January 2012 it was announced that Hirai would be joining Albirex Niigata on loan for the 2012 season.

== International career ==
On 16 March 2007, Hirai received his first call-up to the Japan U-20 squad, and won his first U20 cap as a substitute against Cape Verde on 25 March.

== Team honors ==
- AFC Champions League – 2008
- Emperor's Cup – 2008
- Japanese Super Cup – 2007

== Club career stats ==
Updated to 23 February 2020.

Club performance			League		Emperor's Cup		J. League Cup		Asia		Total	
Season	Club	League	Apps	Goals	Apps	Goals	Apps	Goals	Apps	Goals	Apps	Goals
2006	Gamba Osaka	J1 League	0	0	1	0	0	0	0	0	1	0
2007	Gamba Osaka	J1 League	0	0	0	0	0	0	–		0	0
2008	Gamba Osaka	J1 League	8	0	1	0	1	1	1	0	11	1
2009	Gamba Osaka	J1 League	1	0	0	0	0	0	1	0	2	0
2010	Gamba Osaka	J1 League	23	14	2	2	2	0	4	4	31	20
2011	Gamba Osaka	J1 League	21	5	1	0	2	0	3	0	27	5
2012	Albirex Niigata	J1 League	21	0	1	0	6	2	–		28	2
2013	Gamba Osaka	J2 League	17	4	1	1	-	-	-	-	18	5
2014	Avispa Fukuoka	J2 League	42	3	1	0	-		-		43	3
2015	Avispa Fukuoka	J2 League	15	2	1	0	–		–		16	2
2016	Avispa Fukuoka	J1 League	31	2	0	0	5	3	–		36	5
2017	Giravanz Kitakyushu	J3 League	18	2	1	3	–		–		19	5
2018	Giravanz Kitakyushu	J3 League	9	0	–		–		–		9	0
2018	FC Maruyasu Okazaki	JFL	8	0	–		–		–		8	0
2019	FC Maruyasu Okazaki	JFL	27	7	–		–		–		27	7
Total			241	39	10	6	16	6	9	4	278	55
