= Kenta Hoshihara =

Japanese footballer (born 1988)

Personal information
- Full name: Kenta Hoshihara
- Date of birth: May 1, 1988 (age 38)
- Place of birth: Daitō, Osaka, Japan
- Height: 1.73 m (5 ft 8 in)
- Positions: Forward; defender

Team information
- Current team: Fujieda MYFC
- Number: 29

Youth career
- 1995–2000: Shijonawate FC
- 2001–2006: Gamba Osaka

Senior career*
| Years | Team | Apps | (Gls) |
| 2007–2013 | Gamba Osaka | 15 | (0) |
| 2012 | → Mito HollyHock (loan) | 12 | (1) |
| 2014–2016 | Giravanz Kitakyushu | 102 | (2) |
| 2017–2018 | Matsumoto Yamaga FC | 1 | (0) |
| 2018 | Thespakusatsu Gunma | 24 | (0) |
| 2019– | Fujieda MYFC | | |
Medal record
Gamba Osaka
| Winner | AFC Champions League | 2008 |
| Runner-up | J1 League | 2010 |
| Winner | J.League Cup | 2007 |
| Winner | Emperor's Cup | 2008 |
| Winner | Emperor's Cup | 2009 |
| Runner-up | Emperor's Cup | 2012 |
- * Club domestic league appearances and goals as of 26 April 2020

Kenta Hoshihara (星原 健太, Hoshihara Kenta; born May 1, 1988 in Daitō, Osaka Prefecture) is a Japanese football player who plays for Fujieda MYFC.

== Career ==
On 8 January 2019, Hoshihara joined Fujieda MYFC.

== Club statistics ==
Updated to 23 February 2017.

| Club performance | | | League | | Cup | | League Cup | | Continental | | Total | |
| Season | Club | League | Apps | Goals | Apps | Goals | Apps | Goals | Apps | Goals | Apps | Goals |
| Japan | | | League | | Emperor's Cup | | League Cup | | AFC | | Total | |
|---|---|---|---|---|---|---|---|---|---|---|---|---|
| 2007 | Gamba Osaka | J1 League | 0 | 0 | 0 | 0 | 0 | 0 | 0 | 0 | 0 | 0 |
| 2008 | Gamba Osaka | J1 League | 0 | 0 | 0 | 0 | 0 | 0 | 0 | 0 | 0 | 0 |
| 2009 | Gamba Osaka | J1 League | 0 | 0 | 0 | 0 | 0 | 0 | 0 | 0 | 0 | 0 |
| 2010 | Gamba Osaka | J1 League | 6 | 0 | 0 | 0 | 0 | 0 | 1 | 0 | 7 | 0 |
| 2011 | Gamba Osaka | J1 League | 0 | 0 | 1 | 0 | 1 | 0 | 0 | 0 | 2 | 0 |
| 2012 | Gamba Osaka | J1 League | 2 | 0 | 0 | 0 | 0 | 0 | 2 | 0 | 4 | 0 |
| 2012 | Mito Hollyhock | J2 League | 11 | 1 | 1 | 0 | – | | – | | 12 | 1 |
| 2013 | Gamba Osaka | J2 League | 2 | 0 | 0 | 0 | – | | – | | 2 | 0 |
| 2014 | Giravanz Kitakyushu | J2 League | 35 | 2 | 3 | 0 | – | | – | | 38 | 2 |
| 2015 | Giravanz Kitakyushu | J2 League | 34 | 0 | 1 | 0 | – | | – | | 35 | 0 |
| 2016 | Giravanz Kitakyushu | J2 League | 33 | 0 | 2 | 0 | – | | – | | 35 | 0 |
| Career total | | | 123 | 3 | 8 | 0 | 1 | 0 | 3 | 0 | 135 | 3 |
