= Takuya Takei =

Japanese footballer

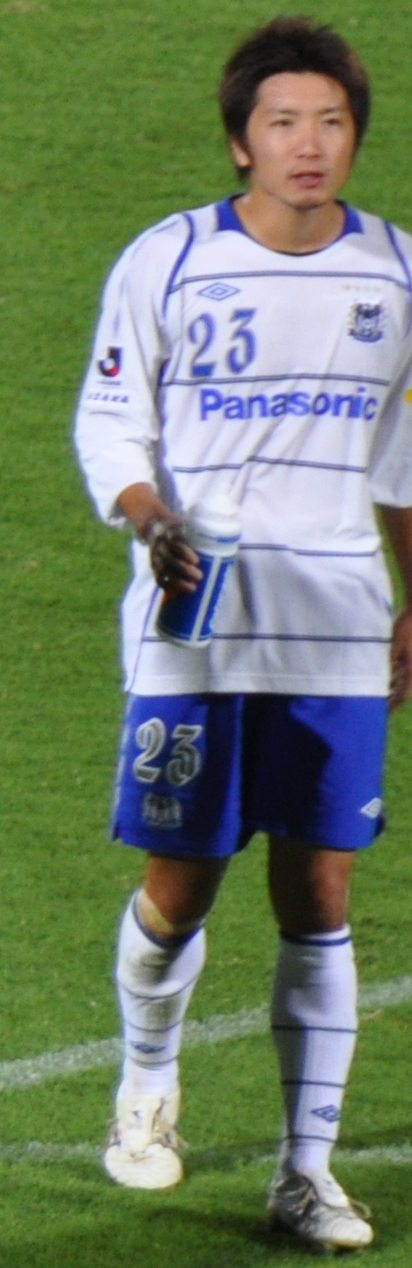
- Takei with Gamba Osaka in 2010

Personal information
- Full name: Takuya Takei
- Date of birth: January 25, 1986 (age 40)
- Place of birth: Tochigi, Tochigi, Japan
- Height: 1.79 m (5 ft 10 in)
- Position: Midfielder

Team information
- Current team: Matsumoto Yamaga
- Number: 7

Youth career
- 2004–2007: Ryutsu Keizai University

Senior career*
Years	Team	Apps	(Gls)
2008–2013	Gamba Osaka	95	(6)
2014–2015	Vegalta Sendai	18	(0)
2016–	Matsumoto Yamaga	25	(0)
Medal record
Gamba Osaka
Winner	AFC Champions League	2008
Runner-up	J1 League	2010
Winner	Emperor's Cup	2008
Winner	Emperor's Cup	2009
Runner-up	Emperor's Cup	2012
- * Club domestic league appearances and goals as of 23 February 2017

Takuya Takei (武井 択也, Takei Takuya; born January 25, 1986 in Tochigi, Tochigi) is a Japanese football player currently playing for Matsumoto Yamaga FC.

== Career statistics ==
Updated to 23 February 2017.

Club performance			League		Cup		League Cup		Continental		Total	
Season	Club	League	Apps	Goals	Apps	Goals	Apps	Goals	Apps	Goals	Apps	Goals
Japan			League		Emperor's Cup		J. League Cup		Asia		Total	
2005	Ryutsu Keizai; University	JFL	9	0	-		-		-		9	0
2006	Ryutsu Keizai; University	JFL	8	0	1	0	-		-		9	0
2007	Ryutsu Keizai; University	JFL	9	1	1	0	-		-		10	1
2008	Gamba Osaka	J1 League	3	0	3	0	2	0	3	0	10	0
2009	Gamba Osaka	J1 League	5	0	2	0	0	0	2	0	9	0
2010	Gamba Osaka	J1 League	21	1	5	0	2	0	3	0	31	1
2011	Gamba Osaka	J1 League	33	2	2	0	2	0	6	2	43	4
2012	Gamba Osaka	J1 League	26	2	6	0	2	0	6	0	40	2
2013	Gamba Osaka	J2 League	7	1	0	0	–		–		7	1
2014	Vegalta Sendai	J1 League	14	0	1	0	4	0	–		19	0
2015	Vegalta Sendai	J1 League	4	0	1	0	5	0	–		10	0
2016	Matsumoto Yamaga	J2 League	25	0	1	0	–		–		26	0
Total			138	6	23	0	17	0	20	2	198	8

== Team honors ==
Gamba Osaka

- AFC Champions League - 2008
- Pan-Pacific Championship - 2008
- Emperor's Cup - 2008, 2009
- J2 League - 2013
