= Shota Kawanishi =

Japanese footballer (born 1988)

Personal information
- Date of birth: October 28, 1988 (age 38)
- Place of birth: Nara, Japan
- Height: 1.77 m (5 ft 9 1/2 in)
- Position: Forward

Team information
- Current team: Nara Club
- Number: 48

Youth career
- –2003: Nara FC
- 2004–2006: Aomori Yamada High School

College career
Years	Team	Apps	(Gls)
2007–2010	Osaka University H&SS		

Senior career*
Years	Team	Apps	(Gls)
2011–2014	Gamba Osaka	25	(6)
2014	→ Montedio Yamagata (loan)	26	(6)
2015–2016	Montedio Yamagata	60	(1)
2017–2020	Oita Trinita	60	(4)
2019–2020	→ FC Gifu (loan)	56	(18)
2021	FC Gifu	26	(13)
2022–2023	Kataller Toyama	31	(7)
2023	→ Kamatamare Sanuki (loan)	17	(2)
2024–2026	Kamatamare Sanuki	59	(12)
2026–	Nara Club	3	(0)
Medal record
Gamba Osaka
Runner-up	Emperor's Cup	2012
Montedio Yamagata
Runner-up	Emperor's Cup	2014
- * Club domestic league appearances and goals as of 25 August 2026

Shota Kawanishi (川西 翔太, born October 28, 1988) is a Japanese football player for Nara Club.

== Club statistics ==
Updated to end of 2018 season.

Club performance			League		Cup		League Cup		Continental		Other		Total	
Season	Club	League	Apps	Goals	Apps	Goals	Apps	Goals	Apps	Goals	Apps	Goals	Apps	Goals
Japan			League		Emperor's Cup		League Cup		Asia		Other^{1}		Total	
2011	Gamba Osaka	J1 League	8	4	2	1	1	0	0	0	–		11	5
2012	Gamba Osaka	J1 League	2	0	0	0	0	0	0	0	–		2	0
2013	Gamba Osaka	J2 League	15	2	0	0	–		–		–		15	2
2014	Montedio Yamagata	J2 League	26	6	5	1	–		–		2	0	33	7
2015	Montedio Yamagata	J1 League	23	0	4	4	5	0	–		–		32	4
2016	Montedio Yamagata	J2 League	37	1	2	1	–		–		–		39	2
2017	Oita Trinita	J2 League	37	2	0	0	–		–		–		37	2
2018	Oita Trinita	J2 League	23	2	1	0	–		–		–		24	2
Career total			134	15	13	7	6	0	0	0	2	0	156	22

^{1}Includes Japanese Super Cup and Promotion Playoffs to J1.
