= 2015 J.League Cup =

Yamazaki Nabisco Cup

Tournament details
- Country: Japan
- Teams: 18

Final positions
- Champions: Kashima Antlers (6th title)
- Runners-up: Gamba Osaka
- Semifinalists: Albirex Niigata; Vissel Kobe

Tournament statistics
- Top goal scorer: Kazuma Watanabe

The 2015 J.League Cup, also known as the 2015 J.League Yamazaki Nabisco Cup for sponsoring purposes, was the 40th edition of the most prestigious Japanese soccer league cup tournament and the 23rd edition under the current J.League Cup format.

== Format ==
Teams from the J.League Division 1 took part in the tournament. Gamba Osaka, Kashima Antlers, Kashiwa Reysol and Urawa Red Diamonds were given a bye to the quarter-finals due to qualification in the 2015 AFC Champions League. The remaining 14 teams started from the group stage, where they were divided into two groups of seven. The group winners and the runners-up of each group qualified for the quarter-final along with the four teams which qualified for the AFC Champions League.

== Group stage ==
=== Group A ===
==== Standings ====
Team	Pld	W	D	L	GF	GA	GD	Pts
FC Tokyo	6	3	3	0	8	4	+4	12
Albirex Niigata	6	3	2	1	9	4	+5	11
Sanfrecce Hiroshima	6	2	3	1	9	6	+3	9
Shonan Bellmare	6	2	3	1	5	5	0	9
Sagan Tosu	6	2	2	2	3	4	−1	8
Matsumoto Yamaga	6	1	1	4	8	13	−5	4
Ventforet Kofu	6	0	2	4	4	10	−6	2

==== Results ====
Home \ Away	TOK	SHO	VEN	YAM	ALB	SFR	SAG
FC Tokyo			2–1		2–1		2–0
Shonan Bellmare	0–0		1–0	2–1			
Ventforet Kofu				1–3	2–2		0–0
Matsumoto Yamaga	1–1				0–3	2–4	
Albirex Niigata		2–0				0–0	1–0
Sanfrecce Hiroshima	1–1	2–2	2–0				
Sagan Tosu		0–0		2–1		1–0	

Legend: Blue = home team win; Yellow = draw; Red = away team win.

=== Group B ===
==== Standings ====
Team	Pld	W	D	L	GF	GA	GD	Pts
Nagoya Grampus	6	4	1	1	12	11	+1	13
Vissel Kobe	6	3	2	1	11	5	+6	11
Kawasaki Frontale	6	2	3	1	7	6	+1	9
Montedio Yamagata	6	2	2	2	10	11	−1	8
Yokohama F. Marinos	6	2	0	4	7	7	0	6
Shimizu S-Pulse	6	2	0	4	6	11	−5	6
Vegalta Sendai	6	1	2	3	6	8	−2	5

==== Results ====
Home \ Away	VEG	MON	FRO	YMA	SSP	GRA	VIS
Vegalta Sendai		1–2		1–0			0–0
Montedio Yamagata				0–2	3–1	3–3	
Kawasaki Frontale	1–1	1–1				1–3	
Yokohama F. Marinos			1–2		2–0		2–3
Shimizu S-Pulse	2–1		0–2			1–2	
Nagoya Grampus	3–2			1–0			0–4
Vissel Kobe		3–1	0–0		1–2		

Legend: Blue = home team win; Yellow = draw; Red = away team win.

== Knock-out stage ==
All times are Japan Standard Time (UTC+9)

Quarterfinals
Kashima Antlers	2	3	5
FC Tokyo	2	0	2
Vissel Kobe	2	2	4
Kashiwa Reysol	0	3	3
Nagoya Grampus	1	2	3 (9)
Gamba Osaka (a.e.t.) (p)	1	2	3 (10)
Urawa Red Diamonds	0	3	3
Albirex Niigata	5	0	5

Semifinals
Kashima Antlers	2	4	6
Vissel Kobe	1	1	2
Gamba Osaka	1	2	3
Albirex Niigata	2	0	2

Finals
Kashima Antlers	3
Gamba Osaka	0

=== Quarterfinals ===
Team 1	Agg.	Team 2	1st leg	2nd leg
FC Tokyo	2–5	Kashima Antlers	2–2	0–3
Kashiwa Reysol	3–4	Vissel Kobe	0–2	3–2
Gamba Osaka	3–3 (10-9 p)	Nagoya Grampus	1–1	2–2
Albirex Niigata	5–3	Urawa Reds	5–0	0–3

=== Semi-finals ===
==== First leg ====
7 October 2015
19:04

Vissel Kobe	1–2	Kashima Antlers
Iwanami 70'		21' Yamamura; 39' Akasaki

Kobe Universiade Memorial Stadium, Kobe
Attendance: 6,162
Referee: Nobutsugu Murakami

7 October 2015
19:03

Albirex Niigata	2–1	Gamba Osaka
Yamamoto 36'; Usami 90'		33' Omori

Denka Big Swan Stadium, Niigata
Attendance: 9,018
Referee: Hajime Matsuo

==== Second leg ====
11 October 2015
14:04

Kashima Antlers	4–1	Vissel Kobe
Nakamura 16'; Kanazaki 53', 74'; Caio 82'		21' Watanabe

Kashima Soccer Stadium, Kashima
Attendance: 10,801
Referee: Kenji Ogiya

Antlers won 6–2 on aggregate.

11 October 2015
14:04

Gamba Osaka	2–0	Albirex Niigata
Endō 57'; Fujiharu 90+4'

Osaka Expo '70 Stadium, Osaka
Attendance: 11,475
Referee: Hiroyuki Kimura

Gamba Osaka won 3-2 on aggregate.

== Final ==
31 October 2015
13:10

Kashima Antlers	3–0	Gamba Osaka
Hwang Seok-ho 60'; Kanazaki 84'; Caio 86'

Saitama Stadium 2002, Saitama
Attendance: 50,828
Referee: Masaaki Toma

== Top scorers ==
Rank	Scorer	Club	Goals
1	(Japan) Kazuma Watanabe	Vissel Kobe	7
2	(Japan) Takuma Asano	Sanfrecce Hiroshima	4
2	(Japan) Ryohei Yamazaki	Albirex Niigata	4
2	(Japan) Hiroshi Ibusuki	Albirex Niigata	4
2	(Japan) Mu Kanazaki	Kashima Antlers	4
3	(Brazil) Elsinho	Kawasaki Frontale	3
3	(Japan) Kosuke Yamamoto	Albirex Niigata	3

Updated to games played on 12 October 2015
Source: J.League Data
