= 2013 Vegalta Sendai season =

Vegalta Sendai
2013 season
- Chairman: Shirahata Yoichi
- Manager: Makoto Teguramori
- J.League Division 1: 13th
- Emperor's Cup: Quarter-finals
- J.League Cup: Quarter-finals
- Champions League: Group stage
- Top goalscorer: League: Wilson; All: Wilson
Home colours	Away colours

The 2013 Vegalta Sendai season was Vegalta Sendai's fourth consecutive season and sixth season overall in J.League Division 1. As a result of their runner-up finish in the 2012 season, the team competed in the 2013 AFC Champions League. Sendai also competed in the 2013 Emperor's Cup and 2013 J.League Cup. It was manager Makoto Teguramori's last season with the club, having accepted a position as head coach of the Japan U-23 team. In mid-season Vegalta Sendai revealed that the A-League's Graham Arnold would manage the team beginning in 2014 season.

== Players ==
As of 5 March 2013 Note: Flags indicate national team as defined under FIFA eligibility rules; some limited exceptions apply. Players may hold more than one non-FIFA nationality.

No.	Pos.	Nation	Player
1	GK	JPN	Shigeru Sakurai
2	DF	JPN	Jiro Kamata
3	DF	JPN	Kodai Watanabe
4	DF	JPN	Toshio Shimakawa
5	DF	JPN	Naoki Ishikawa
6	DF	JPN	Makoto Kakuda
7	MF	JPN	Hiroaki Okuno
8	MF	JPN	Toshihiro Matsushita
9	FW	JPN	Takayuki Nakahara
10	MF	PRK	Ryang Yong-Gi
11	MF	JPN	Yoshiaki Ota
13	FW	JPN	Atsushi Yanagisawa
14	MF	JPN	Hayato Sasaki
15	MF	BRA	Heberty
16	GK	JPN	Takuto Hayashi

No.	Pos.	Nation	Player
17	MF	JPN	Shingo Tomita
18	FW	BRA	Wilson
19	FW	JPN	Yuki Muto
20	DF	JPN	Takuya Wada
21	GK	JPN	Yosuke Abe
22	GK	JPN	Kei Ishikawa
23	MF	JPN	Naoya Tamura
24	FW	JPN	Shingo Akamine
25	MF	JPN	Naoki Sugai
26	MF	JPN	Keita Fujimura
27	MF	BRA	Diogo
28	DF	JPN	Koji Hachisuka
29	DF	JPN	Taikai Uemoto
30	MF	JPN	Yuta Echigo

=== Out on loan ===
Note: Flags indicate national team as defined under FIFA eligibility rules; some limited exceptions apply. Players may hold more than one non-FIFA nationality.

No.	Pos.	Nation	Player
—	GK	JPN	Kentaro Seki (to Yokohama FC)
—	MF	JPN	Yoshiki Takahashi (to Sagan Tosu)
—	FW	JPN	Yuki Nakashima (to Montedio Yamagata)

== Competitions ==
=== J.League ===
==== League table ====
Pos	Team	Pld	W	D	L	GF	GA	GD	Pts
11	Nagoya Grampus	34	13	8	13	47	48	−1	47
12	Sagan Tosu	34	13	7	14	54	63	−9	46
13	Vegalta Sendai	34	11	12	11	41	38	+3	45
14	Omiya Ardija	34	14	3	17	45	48	−3	45
15	Ventforet Kofu	34	8	13	13	30	41	−11	37

Updated to match(es) played on 7 December 2013. Source: J.League Division 1
Rules for classification: 1) points; 2) goal difference; 3) number of goals scored.

==== Matches ====
2 March 2013 1	Vegalta Sendai	1–1	Ventforet Kofu	Sendai
14:06	Wada (yellow card) 3'; Watanabe 49'	Summary	Sho Sasaki (yellow card) 55'; Hugo 72'	Stadium: Yurtec Stadium; Attendance: 16,353; Referee: (Japan) Kenji Ogiya

9 March 2013 2	Kashima Antlers	3–2	Vegalta Sendai	Kashima
14:05	Davi 29', 48'; Osako 47'	Summary	Ota 46'; Wilson 67'	Stadium: Kashima Soccer Stadium; Attendance: 19,981; Referee: (Japan) Yuichi Nishimura

16 March 2013 3	Vegalta Sendai	2–1	Kashiwa Reysol	Sendai
14:04	Matsushita 5' (yellow card) 28'; Hachisuka (yellow card) 25'; Wilson 86'	Summary	Kondo (yellow card) 43'; Domingues 52'; Tanaguchi (yellow card) 89'	Stadium: Yurtec Stadium; Attendance: 13,232; Referee: (Japan) Nobutsugu Murakami

30 March 2013 4	Cerezo Osaka	1–1	Vegalta Sendai	Higashisumiyoshi-ku, Osaka
13:04	Kakitani 51'; Araiba (yellow card) 73'	Summary	32' (o.g.); Wilson (yellow card) 43'; Kamata (yellow card) 68'	Stadium: Osaka Nagai Stadium; Attendance: 13,721; Referee: (Japan) Yudai Yamamoto

6 April 2013 5	Vegalta Sendai	0–1	Albirex Niigata	Sendai
14:04	Tomita (yellow card) 25'	Summary	Naruoka 16'; Tanaka (yellow card) 37'; Homma (red card) 90'	Stadium: Yurtec Stadium; Attendance: 12,883; Referee: (Japan) Tomohiro Inoue

13 April 2013 6	Vegalta Sendai	2–1	FC Tokyo	Sendai
14:04	Sugai (yellow card) 37'; Kakuda 47'; Wilson 60'; Kamata (yellow card) 60'	Summary	Lee 79'; Kaga (yellow card) 90+1'	Stadium: Yurtec Stadium; Attendance: 13,655; Referee: (Japan) Minoru Tojo

20 April 2013 7	Kawasaki Frontale	4–2	Vegalta Sendai	Kawasaki
13:03	Ōkubo 25', 53'; Renato 28', 40'; Saneto (yellow card) 62'	Summary	Ryang 49'; Ishikawa 60'	Stadium: Kawasaki Todoroki Stadium; Attendance: 14,739; Referee: (Japan) Kenji Ogiya

28 April 2013 8	Vegalta Sendai	1–1	Sagan Tosu	Sendai
16:04	Kakuda (yellow card) 13'; Akamine 54'; Tamura (yellow card) 72'; Watanabe (yellow card) 90'	Summary	Fujita 15' (yellow card) 90'	Stadium: Yurtec Stadium; Attendance: 14,359; Referee: (Japan) Yuichi Nishimura

29 May 2013 9	Urawa Reds	1–1	Vegalta Sendai	Saitama
19:34	Abe 80'	Summary	Kamata (yellow card) 58'; Ota 88'	Stadium: Saitama Stadium; Attendance: 24,184; Referee: (Japan) Hiroyoshi Takayama

6 May 2013 10	Nagoya Grampus	0–2	Vegalta Sendai	Toyota
19:03		Summary	Kakuda 28'; Yanagisawa 58'; Tomita (yellow card) 78'; Nakahara (yellow card) 90+3'	Stadium: Toyota Stadium; Attendance: 12,075; Referee: (Japan) Jumpei Iida

11 May 2013 11	Vegalta Sendai	2–1	Omiya Ardija	Sendai
14,327	Akamine 7'; Kakuda (yellow card) 15'; Kamata (yellow card) 30'; Wilson 44'	Summary	Novaković (yellow card) 33'; Kanazawa (yellow card) 64'; Ljubijankić 65'; Aoki (yellow card) 90+1'	Stadium: Yurtec Stadium; Attendance: 14,327; Referee: (Japan) Futoshi Nakamura

18 May 2013 12	Yokohama F. Marinos	0–0	Vegalta Sendai	Yokohama
23,083	Hyodo (yellow card) 44'; Kobayashi (yellow card) 45'; Dutra (yellow card) 58'	Summary	Kakuda (yellow card) 30'; Tamura (yellow card) 45'	Stadium: Nissan Stadium; Attendance: 23,083; Referee: (Japan) Koichiro Fukushima

25 May 2013 13	Shimizu S-Pulse	2–0	Vegalta Sendai	Shimizu-ku, Shizuoka
14:04	Kawai 49'; Yoshida (yellow card) 51'; Senuma (yellow card) 81'; Takagi 87'	Summary	Watanabe (yellow card) 86'; Makoto Kakuda (yellow card) 76'	Stadium: Outsourcing Stadium Nihondaira; Attendance: 12,642; Referee: (Japan) Minoru Tojo

6 July 2013 14	Vegalta Sendai	0–0	Shonan Bellmare	Sendai
19:03	Tomita (yellow card) 78'	Summary	Otsuki (yellow card) 22'; Han (yellow card) 24'; Kamata (yellow card) 88'	Stadium: Yurtec Stadium; Attendance: 13,470; Referee: (Japan) Nobutsugu Murakami

10 July 2013 15	Oita Trinita	0–1	Vegalta Sendai	Ōita
19:05	Matsuda (yellow card) 24'; Choi (yellow card) 56'; Daiki (yellow card) 72'	Summary	Sugai 43'; Muto (yellow card) 90+1'	Stadium: Ōita Bank Dome; Attendance: 7,067; Referee: (Japan) Koichiro Fukushima

13 July 2013 16	Vegalta Sendai	1–1	Júbilo Iwata	Sendai
19:04	Kakuda 89'	Summary	Maeda 51'; Komano (yellow card) 71'; Kawaguchi (yellow card) 86'	Stadium: Yurtec Stadium; Attendance: 14,318; Referee: (Japan) Kenji Ogiya

17 July 2013 17	Vegalta Sendai	0–2	Sanfrecce Hiroshima	Sendai
19:04	Kamata (yellow card) 70'; Kakuda (yellow card) 86'	Summary	Ishihara 12' (yellow card) 18'; Sato 13'; Mizumoto (yellow card) 45+1'	Stadium: Yurtec Stadium; Attendance: 11,755; Referee: (Japan) Jumpei Iida

31 July 2013 18	Ventforet Kofu	0–1	Vegalta Sendai	Kōfu
8,773	Fukuda (yellow card) 17'; Aoyama (yellow card) 46'	Summary	Wilson 22'; Kamata (yellow card) 60'; Hachisuka (yellow card) 89'	Stadium: Yamanashi Chuo Bank Stadium; Attendance: 8,773; Referee: (Japan) Masaaki Iemoto

3 August 2013 19	Vegalta Sendai	2–1	Kawasaki Frontale	Sendai
19:04	Wilson 14'; Ota (yellow card) 25'; Matsushita 78'; Muto (yellow card) 81'	Summary	Renato 72'; Ōkubo (yellow card) 74'	Stadium: Yurtec Stadium; Attendance: 14,365; Referee: (Japan) Hiroyuki Kimura

10 August 2013 20	Vegalta Sendai	2–1	Kashima Antlers	Sendai
19:04	Yanagisawa 55'; Heberty 81'	Summary	Nishi (yellow card) 18'; Nakamura 23'	Stadium: Yurtec Stadium; Attendance: 17,892; Referee: (Japan) Minoru Tojo

17 August 2013 21	Kashiwa Reysol	0–0	Vegalta Sendai	Kashiwa
19:03	Fujita (yellow card) 31'; Kudo (yellow card) 73'	Summary	Heberty (yellow card) 63'	Stadium: Hitachi Kashiwa Stadium; Attendance: 11,838; Referee: (Japan) Toshimitsu Yoshida

24 August 2013 22	Sagan Tosu	1–0	Vegalta Sendai	Tosu
19:04	Mizunuma 26'; Nilson (yellow card) 90+5'	Summary	Kamata (yellow card) 73'	Stadium: Best Amenity Stadium; Attendance: 9,266; Referee: (Japan) Nobutsugu Murakami

28 August 2013 23	Vegalta Sendai	1–1	Cerezo Osaka	Sendai
19:04	Ryang 24'	Summary	Ogihara 45'	Stadium: Yurtec Stadium; Attendance: 15,101; Referee: (Japan) Koichiro Fukushima

31 August 2013 24	Shonan Bellmare	3–2	Vegalta Sendai	Hiratsuka
19:04	Shimamura 32', 58'; Wellington 64'; Ono (yellow card) 82'; Nagaki (yellow card) 83'; Stevo (yellow card) 90'	Summary	Wilson 37', 84'	Stadium: Shonan BMW Stadium; Attendance: 11,188; Referee: (Japan) Masaaki Iemoto

14 September 2013 25	Vegalta Sendai	6–0	Oita Trinita	Sendai
19:04	Kakuda 5', 65'; Ryang 30'; Yanagisawa 53'; Ishikawa 61'; Wilson 82'	Summary	Tokita (yellow card) 25'; Matsubara (yellow card) 48'; Sakata (yellow card) 64'	Stadium: Yurtec Stadium; Attendance: 13,411; Referee: (Japan) Ryuji Sato

21 September 2013 26	Omiya Ardija	0–2	Vegalta Sendai	Saitama
16:04	Wada (yellow card) 10'	Summary	Ishikawa 53'; Ryang 73' (yellow card) 90+1'	Stadium: NACK5 Stadium Omiya; Attendance: 11,185; Referee: (Japan) Hiroyuki Kimura

28 September 2013 27	Vegalta Sendai	0–0	Yokohama F. Marinos	Sendai
13:04		Summary	Tomisawa (yellow card) 18'; Hanato (yellow card) 88'	Stadium: Yurtec Stadium; Attendance: 17,849; Referee: (Japan) Jumpei Iida

5 October 2013 28	Júbilo Iwata	1–1	Vegalta Sendai	Iwata
15:04	Abe (yellow card) 35'; Maeda 75'; Carlinhos (yellow card) 90+1'	Summary	Sugai 63'; Kamata (yellow card) 72'	Stadium: Yamaha Stadium; Attendance: 8,218; Referee: (Japan) Toshimitsu Yoshida

19 October 2013 29	Vegalta Sendai	2–1	Nagoya Grampus	Sendai
14:04	Wilson 48' (yellow card) 76' (goal) 90+3'	Summary	Tamada 56'; Isomura (yellow card) 90+3'	Stadium: Yurtec Stadium; Attendance: 15,178; Referee: (Japan) Koichiro Fukushima

26 October 2013 30	Sanfrecce Hiroshima	1–0	Vegalta Sendai	Hiroshima
16:04	Ishihara 84'	Summary	Matsushita (yellow card) 24'	Stadium: Hiroshima Big Arch; Attendance: 17,184; Referee: (Japan) Futoshi Nakamura

10 November 2013 31	Vegalta Sendai	3–3	Urawa Red Diamonds	Sendai
19:05	Wilson 2'; Watanabe (yellow card) 29'; Akamine 47' (yellow card) 54'; Ishikawa 90+2'	Summary	Umesaki 6'; Makino (yellow card) 23'; Koroki 31', 59'; Koroki (yellow card) 90'	Stadium: Miyagi Stadium; Attendance: 17,183; Referee: (Japan) Jumpei Iida

23 November 2013 32	Albirex Niigata	0–1	Vegalta Sendai	Niigata
17:04	Okamoto 18'	Summary		Stadium: Tohoku Electric Power Big Swan Stadium; Attendance: 32,425; Referee: (Japan) Hajime Matsuo

30 November 2013 33	Vegalta Sendai	1–2	Shimizu S-Pulse	Sendai
17:04	Hachisuka (yellow card) 5'; Wilson 54'	Summary	Ito 15'; Radoncic 34'; Sugiyama (yellow card) 75'; Omae (yellow card) 90+3'; Kushibiki (yellow card) 90+5'	Stadium: Yurtec Stadium; Attendance: 17,394; Referee: (Japan) Yudai Yamamoto

7 December 2013 34	FC Tokyo	2–0	Vegalta Sendai	Chofu
15:33	Vucicevic (yellow card) 39'; Lucas 53'; Takahashi (yellow card) 70'Hirayama 90+2'	Summary	Watanabe (yellow card) 55'; Ryang (yellow card) 80'	Stadium: Ajinomoto Stadium; Attendance: 27,583; Referee: (Japan) Futoshi Nakamura

=== J.League Cup ===
==== Quarterfinal ====
23 June 2013 First Leg	Kawasaki Frontale	2–1	Vegalta Sendai	Kawasaki
18:00 JST	Kobayashi 36'; Tanaka (yellow card) 38'; Renato 77' (yellow card) 78'	Summary	Sugai (yellow card) 21'; Hachisuka (yellow card) 60'Matsushita 90+3'	Stadium: Kawasaki Todoroki Stadium; Attendance: 10,711; Referee: (Japan) Hajime Matsuo

30 June 2013 Second Leg	Vegalta Sendai	2–3 (3–5 agg.)	Kawasaki Frontale	Sendai
18:04 JST	Wilson 4', 68'	Summary	Kengo Nakamura 10', 41'; Moriya 50'	Stadium: Yurtec; Attendance: 11,176; Referee: (Japan) Ryuji Sato

=== Emperor's Cup ===
7 September 2013 Second Round	Vegalta Sendai	3–0	Blaublitz Akita	Sendai
15:00	Sasaki 1'; Akamine 63'; Matsushita 82'	Summary	Kumabayashi (yellow card) 29'; Shinzato (yellow card) 49'; Handa (yellow card) 71'	Stadium: Yurtec; Attendance: 3,377; Referee: (Japan) Yoshiro Imamura

13 October 2013 Third Round	Vegalta Sendai	1–1 (a.e.t.) (3–1 p)	Mito HollyHock	Sendai
13:00	Akamine 15' (yellow card) 86'	Summary	Hosokawa 9' (yellow card) 45+1'; Suzuki (yellow card) 90+4'	Stadium: Yurtec; Attendance: 6,053; Referee: (Japan) Takuto Okabe
	Penalties
	Ota (penalty scored); Ryang (penalty scored); Kamata (penalty scored)		Suzuki (penalty scored); Hashimoto (penalty missed); Yamamura (penalty missed); Ishigami (penalty missed)

16 November 2013 Fourth Round	Shimizu S-Pulse	0–1	Vegalta Sendai	Shizuoka
13:00	Kawai (yellow card) 54'	Summary	Ryang 82'	Stadium: IAI Stadium

==== Quarterfinal ====
22 December 2013 Quarterfinal	Vegalta Sendai	1–2	FC Tokyo	Sendai
13:00	Wilson 3'	Summary	Ota 90+3'; Hayashi 120'	Stadium: Yurtec Stadium

=== AFC Champions League ===
==== Group stage ====
Pos	Team	Pld	W	D	L	GF	GA	GD	Pts	Qualification
1	(South Korea) FC Seoul	6	3	2	1	11	5	+6	11	Advance to knockout stage
2	(Thailand) Buriram United	6	1	4	1	6	6	0	7	Advance to knockout stage
3	(China) Jiangsu Sainty	6	2	1	3	5	10	−5	7	
4	(Japan) Vegalta Sendai	6	1	3	2	5	6	−1	6	

26 February 2013	Vegalta Sendai	1–1	Buriram United	Yurtec Stadium Sendai, Sendai
19:00 UTC+9	Ryang Yong-Gi 53' (pen.)	Report	Osmar 76'	Attendance: 10,206; Referee: Liu Kwok Man (Hong Kong)

12 March 2013	Jiangsu Sainty	0–0	Vegalta Sendai	Nanjing Olympic Sports Center, Nanjing
19:40 UTC+8		Report		Attendance: 44,785; Referee: Abdullah Balideh (Qatar)

2 April 2013	FC Seoul	2–1	Vegalta Sendai	Seoul World Cup Stadium, Seoul
19:30 UTC+9	Escudero 6'; Kim Jin-Kyu 22'	Report	Wilson 87' (pen.)	Attendance: 9,762; Referee: Valentin Kovalenko (Uzbekistan)

10 April 2013	Vegalta Sendai	1–0	FC Seoul	Yurtec Stadium Sendai, Sendai
19:00 UTC+9	Yanagisawa 16'	Report		Attendance: 8,874; Referee: Mohamed Al Zarouni (United Arab Emirates)

24 April 2013	Buriram United	1–1	Vegalta Sendai	New I-Mobile Stadium, Buriram
18:00 UTC+7	Osmar 53'	Report	Nakahara 90+3'	Attendance: 19,237; Referee: Ali Abdulnabi (Bahrain)

1 May 2013	Vegalta Sendai	1–2	Jiangsu Sainty	Yurtec Stadium Sendai, Sendai
19:30 UTC+9	Sugai 24'	Report	Liu Jianye 38'; Salihi 62'	Attendance: 11,241; Referee: Ravshan Irmatov (Uzbekistan)
