= 2012 Vegalta Sendai season =

Vegalta Sendai
2012 season
- Chairman: Shirahata Yoichi
- Manager: Makoto Teguramori
- Stadium: Yurtec Stadium Sendai
- J1 League: Runners-up
- J.League Cup: Quarterfinals
- Emperor's Cup: Third round
- Top goalscorer: League: Shingo Akamine; All: Shingo Akamine
| Home colours | Away colours |

The 2012 Vegalta Sendai season was Vegalta Sendai's third consecutive season, and fifth overall, in J.League Division 1. They ended the season in second place, an all-time best finish for Sendai. Vegalta Sendai also competed in the 2012 Emperor's Cup and 2012 J.League Cup, finishing in the Third Round and the Quarterfinals respectively.

== Competitions ==
=== J.League ===
==== League table ====
| Pos | Team | Pld | W | D | L | GF | GA | GD | Pts | Qualification or relegation |
|---|---|---|---|---|---|---|---|---|---|---|
| 1 | Sanfrecce Hiroshima (C) | 34 | 19 | 7 | 8 | 63 | 34 | +29 | 64 | Qualification to 2012 Club World Cup and 2013 Champions League |
| 2 | Vegalta Sendai | 34 | 15 | 12 | 7 | 59 | 43 | +16 | 57 | Qualification to 2013 Champions League (Note: The winners of the 2012 Emperor's Cup qualified for the group stage of the 2013 AFC Champions League.) |
| 3 | Urawa Red Diamonds | 34 | 15 | 10 | 9 | 47 | 42 | +5 | 55 | Qualification to 2013 Champions League |
| 4 | Yokohama F. Marinos | 34 | 13 | 14 | 7 | 44 | 33 | +11 | 53 | |
| 5 | Sagan Tosu | 34 | 15 | 8 | 11 | 48 | 39 | +9 | 53 | |

Updated to match(es) played on 1 December 2012. Source: J.League Division 1
Rules for classification: 1) points; 2) goal difference; 3) number of goals scored.
(C) Champions

==== Matches ====
| 10 March 2012 1 | Vegalta Sendai | 1–0 | Kashima Antlers | Sendai |
| 14:04 JST | Kamata (yellow card) 12'; Kakuda (yellow card) 33'; Uemoto 62' | (Report) | (yellow card) 33' Alex; (yellow card) 49' Araiba; (yellow card) 58' Masuda | Stadium: Yurtec Stadium Sendai; Attendance: 18,250; Referee: (Japan) Hiroyuki Kimura |

| 17 March 2012 2 | Yokohama F. Marinos | 0–2 | Vegalta Sendai | Yokohama |
| 14:03 JST | Ogura (yellow card) 64'; Iikura (yellow card) 90+7' | (Report) | (yellow card) 18' Kakuda; 43' Akamine; (yellow card) 44' Sugai; 90+8' Ota | Stadium: Nissan Stadium; Attendance: 19,488; Referee: (Japan) Yoshiro Imamura |

| 24 March 2012 3 | Vegalta Sendai | 4–1 | Omiya Ardija | Sendai |
| 13:03 JST | Sekiguchi (yellow card) 53'; Ota 54', 82'; Own-Goal 60'; Sugai 73'; Watanabe (yellow card) 84' | (Report) | 8' Cho; (yellow card) 50' Ueda | Stadium: Yurtec Stadium Sendai; Attendance: 11,831; Referee: (Japan) Minoru Tojo |

| 31 March 2012 4 | Cerezo Osaka | 1–2 | Vegalta Sendai | Osaka |
| 15:04 JST | Kempes (yellow card) 12'; Bando 85' | (Report) | (yellow card) 15' Kakuda; 34' Wilson; 51' Akamine; (yellow card) 57' Tomita | Stadium: KINCHO Stadium; Attendance: 9,598; Referee: (Japan) Nobutsugu Murakami |

| 7 April 2012 5 | Vegalta Sendai | 2–2 | Júbilo Iwata | Sendai |
| 14:03 JST | Kakuda (yellow card) 43'; Wilson (yellow card) 62', (goal) 90+5'; Sekiguchi 75', (yellow card) 90+1' | (Report) | (yellow card) 1' Maeda; 58' Suganuma; (yellow card) 61', (goal) 79' Yamamoto; (yellow card) 86' Cho | Stadium: Yurtec Stadium Sendai; Attendance: 13,147; Referee: (Japan) Toshimitsu Yoshida |

| 14 April 2012 6 | Kashiwa Reysol | 2–3 | Vegalta Sendai | Kashiwa |
| 13:03 JST | Fujita (yellow card) 36'; Leandro 55', 66', (yellow card) 85' (yellow-red card) 88'; Sakai (yellow card) 80' | (Report) | 2' Sugai; (yellow card) 15' Wilson; (yellow card) 34' Uemoto; (yellow card) 37' Ota; 56' Sekiguchi; 78' Akamine; (yellow card) 90+3' Uchiyama | Stadium: Kashiwa Hitachi Stadium; Attendance: 12,318; Referee: (Japan) Kenji Ogiya |

| 21 April 2012 7 | Vegalta Sendai | 4–0 | FC Tokyo | Sendai |
| 19:04 JST | Kakuda (yellow card) 20'; Kamata (yellow card) 37'; Akamine 45+3'; Uemoto (yellow card) 53'; Sekiguchi 58'; Wilson (yellow card) 75'; Ota 76'; Kamata 87' | (Report) | (yellow card) 45+2' Otake; (yellow card) 50' Ota; (yellow card) 72' Lucas; (red card) 75' Ranko Popović (Manager) | Stadium: Yurtec Stadium Sendai; Attendance: 17,192; Referee: (Japan) Minoru Tojo |

| 28 April 2012 8 | Albirex Niigata | 0–1 | Vegalta Sendai | Niigata |
| 16:03 JST | Yano (yellow card) 45+1'; Bruno Lopes (yellow card) 63' (yellow-red card) 90'; Kikuchi (yellow card) 67'; Suzuki (yellow card) 88'; Homma (yellow card) 88'; Higashiguchi (yellow card) 88' | (Report) | (yellow card) 44' Park; 89' Wilson | Stadium: Tohoku Denryoku Big Swan Stadium; Attendance: 24,637; Referee: (Japan) Futoshi Nakamura |

| 3 May 2012 9 | Sagan Tosu | 1–1 | Vegalta Sendai | Tosu |
| 16:04 JST | Tozin (yellow card) 27'; Toyoda 57'; Kiyotake (yellow card) 70' | (Report) | 19' Tomita | Stadium: Best Amenity Stadium; Attendance: 18,113; Referee: (Japan) Koichiro Fukushima |

| 6 May 2012 10 | Vegalta Sendai | 0–1 | Shimizu S-Pulse | Sendai |
| 13:04 JST | | (Report) | 40', (yellow card) 53' Omae; (yellow card) 57' (yellow-red card) 68' Calvin Jong-a-Pin; (yellow card) 62' Takagi; (yellow card) 62' Kobayashi | Stadium: Yurtec Stadium Sendai; Attendance: 18,525; Referee: (Japan) Ryuji Sato |

| 12 May 2012 11 | Gamba Osaka | 1–1 | Vegalta Sendai | Osaka |
| 19:04 JST | Paulinho (yellow card) 18'; Kurata 62' | (Report) | (yellow card) 16' Kamata; (yellow card) 64' Uemoto; (yellow card) 65' Tamura; 78' Akamine | Stadium: Expo '70 Commemorative Stadium; Attendance: 15,253; Referee: (Japan) Yudai Yamamoto |

| 19 May 2012 12 | Vegalta Sendai | 4–0 | Nagoya Grampus | Yurtec Stadium Sendai |
| 18:33 JST | Ryang 38'; Own Goal 45+4'; Kakuda (yellow card) 58'; Wilson 87'; Sugai 90' | (Report) | (yellow card) 37' Tanaka; (yellow card) 90+5' Masukawa | Attendance: 16,317; Referee: (Japan) Masaaki Iemoto |

| 26 May 2012 13 | Kawasaki Frontale | 3–2 | Vegalta Sendai | Todoroki Athletics Stadium |
| 14:04 JST | Kobayashi 20'; Noborizato 61'; Yajima 90+2' | (Report) | 24' Tomita; 54' Wilson; (yellow card) 85' Akamine | Attendance: 16,058; Referee: (Japan) Takuya Maeda |

| 16 June 2012 14 | Vegalta Sendai | 4–1 | Consadole Sapporo | Yurtec Stadium Sendai |
| 13:30 JST | Yangisawa 45+1', 47'; Wilson 56' (yellow card) 75'; Nakahara 72'; Sugai (yellow card) 81' | Report | Kamata 49' (o.g.); Okayama (yellow card) 51' | Attendance: 13,554; Referee: (Japan) Koichiro Fukushima |

| 23 June 2012 15 | Urawa Red Diamonds | 0–0 | Vegalta Sendai | Saitama Stadium 2002 |
| 19:00 JST | Ugajin (yellow card) 39' | Report | | Attendance: 39,545; Referee: (Japan) Yuichi Nishimura |

| 30 June 2012 16 | Vegalta Sendai | 2–2 | Sanfrecce Hiroshima | Yurtec Stadium Sendai |
| 18:30 JST | Wilson 11', 79'; Kakuda (yellow card) 69' | Report | Satō 45+3'; Chiba (yellow card) 55'; Morisaki 65' | Attendance: 18,722; Referee: (Japan) Toshimitsu Yoshida |

| 7 July 2012 17 | Vissel Kobe | 0–1 | Vegalta Sendai | Home's Stadium Kobe |
| 19:00 JST | Ogawa (yellow card) 48' | Report | Akamine 19'; Kamata (yellow card) 51'; Tomita (yellow card) 63' | Attendance: 15,062; Referee: (Japan) Minoru Tojo |

| 14 July 2012 18 | Nagoya Grampus | 0–0 | Vegalta Sendai | Mizuho Athletic Stadium |
| 20:00 JST | Fujimoto (yellow card) 32' | Report | Tamura (yellow card) 65' | Attendance: 24,397; Referee: (Japan) Jumpei IIda |

| 28 July 2012 19 | Vegalta Sendai | 1–1 | Sagan Tosu | Yurtec Stadium Sendai |
| 19:30 JST | Akamine 29'; Wilson (yellow card) 67'; Yanagisawa (yellow card) 90+2' | Report | Toyoda 14'; Isozaki (yellow card) 62'; Okamoto (yellow card) 81'; Yeo Sung-Hye (yellow card) 90+8' | Attendance: 14,611; Referee: (Japan) Masaaki Iemoto |

| 4 August 2012 20 | Vegalta Sendai | 2–2 | Yokohama F. Marinos | Yurtec Stadium Sendai |
| 19:30 JST | Uchiyama (yellow card) 7' (goal) 60'; Kamata (yellow card) 30'; Wilson 87' (pen.) | Report | Nakamura 66'; Kanai 71'; Ono (yellow card) 74'; Tomisawa (yellow card) 82'; Kurihara (yellow card) 86' | Attendance: 17,935; Referee: (Japan) Hajime Matsuo |

| 11 August 2012 21 | Consadole Sapporo | 2–1 | Vegalta Sendai | Sapporo Dome |
| 15:00 JST | Hidaka 79'; Watanabe 90+4' (o.g.) | Report | Watanabe 12' | Attendance: 945; Referee: (Japan) Nobutsugu Murakami |

| 18 August 2012 22 | Vegalta Sendai | 0–0 | Kashiwa Reysol | Yurtec Stadium Sendai |
| 20:00 JST | Matsushita (yellow card) 37' | Summary | Kudo (yellow card) 12' | Attendance: 17,715; Referee: (Japan) Hiroyoshi Takayama |

| 25 August 2012 23 | Omiya Ardija | 1–3 | Vegalta Sendai | NACK5 Stadium Omiya |
| 20:00 JST | Kataoka (yellow card); Hasegawa 25' (yellow card) | [[[Category:All articles with unsourced statements]] Summary] | Wilson 45'; Kamata 57'; Matsushita 90+3' | Attendance: 11,993; Referee: (Japan) Masaaki Iemoto |

| 1 September 2012 24 | Vegalta Sendai | 2–1 | Kawasaki Frontale | Yurtec Stadium Sendai |
| 20:00 JST | Akamine (yellow card) 45+1'; Tomita (yellow card) 50'; Tamura 56'; Ryang Yong-Gi 63' | Summary | Igawa (yellow card) 30'; Noborizato 32'; Renê Ferreira dos Santos (yellow card) 45'; Koya Kazama (yellow card) 52'; Tanaka (yellow card) 54'; Jeci (yellow card) 89' | Attendance: 17,159; Referee: (Japan) Yoshiro Imamura |

| 15 September 2012 25 | Sanfrecce Hiroshima | 2–1 | Vegalta Sendai | Hiroshima Big Arch |
| 19:00 | Morisaki 48'; Chiba (yellow card) 65'; Takahagi 78' | | Kamata (yellow card) 27'; Tomita (yellow card) 45+3'; Sakurai (yellow card) 46'; Akamine 70'; Sugai (yellow card) 81' | Attendance: 25,352; Referee: (Japan) Kenji Ogiya |

| 22 September 2012 26 | Vegalta Sendai | 2–1 | Vissel Kobe | Yurtec Stadium Sendai |
| 15:30 | Akamine 42'; Kamata 90' | | Tashiro 19' | Attendance: 15,509; Referee: (Japan) Nobutsugu Murakami |

| 29 September 2012 27 | Shimizu S-Pulse | 3–1 | Vegalta Sendai | Outsourcing Stadium Nihondaira |
| 14:00 | Kim Hyun-Sung (yellow card) 56' (goal) 70', 90+2'; Lee Ki-Je (yellow card) 75'; Senuma 84' | Summary | Sugai 14'; Kamata (yellow card) 56' (yellow-red card) 60'; Akamine (yellow card) 63'; Matsushita (yellow card) 87' | Attendance: 12,131; Referee: (Japan) Minoru Tojo |

| 6 October 2012 28 | Vegalta Sendai | 2–1 | Gamba Osaka | Yurtec Stadium Sendai |
| 20:00 | Wilson (yellow card) 18'; Sugai (yellow card) 51'; Ryang Yong-Gi 76'; Nakahara 82' | Summary | Sato (yellow card) 62'; Paulinho 90' | Attendance: 18,003; Referee: (Japan) Hiroyuki Kimura |

| 20 October 2012 29 | Vegalta Sendai | 3–2 | Urawa Red Diamonds | Yurtec Stadium Sendai |
| 14:00 | Akamine 2'; Kakuda (yellow card) 35'; Tamura (yellow card) 47'; Wilson 62', 79' (yellow card) 88' | Summary | Marcio Richardes (yellow card) 33' (goal) 82'; Popó (yellow card) 39'; Makino 64' | Attendance: 17,711; Referee: (Japan) Yudai Yamamoto |

| 27 October 2012 30 | Júbilo Iwata | 1–1 | Vegalta Sendai | Yamaha Stadium |
| 15:00 | Fujita; Yamamoto 84' | Summary | Sugai (yellow card) 75'; Akamine 77' | Attendance: 10,753; Referee: (Japan) Maasaki Toma |

| 7 November 2012 31 | Vegalta Sendai | 1–1 | Cerezo Osaka | Yurtec Stadium Sendai |
| 19:00 | Sugai 90'; Watanabe (yellow card) 72'; Park (yellow card) 90+4' | Summary | Kakitani 55'; Kim (yellow card) 61'; Bando (red card) 88' | Attendance: 17,493; Referee: (Japan) Kenji Ogiya |

| 17 November 2012 32 | Kashima Antlers | 3–3 | Vegalta Sendai | Kashima Soccer Stadium |
| 14:00 | Koroki 30', 76'; Osako 47'; Nishi (yellow card) 21'; Ogasawara (yellow card) 39' | Summary | Akamine 12', 39'; Wilson 22'; Tamura (yellow card) 61'; Sugai (yellow card) 90+3' | Attendance: 15,035; Referee: (Japan) Toshimitsu Yoshida |

| 24 November 2012 33 | Vegalta Sendai | 0–1 | Albirex Niigata | Yurtec Stadium Sendai |
| 14:30 | | Summary | Kim 17'; Shubouchi (yellow card) 30'; Fitzgerald (yellow card) 66'; Homma (yellow card) 66' | Attendance: 18,526; Referee: (Japan) Nobutsugu Murakami |

| 1 December 2012 34 | F.C. Tokyo | 6–2 | Vegalta Sendai | Ajinomoto Stadium |
| 15:30 | Lucas Severino 8', 17'; Jang 49'; Watanabe 56'; Vucicevic 82', 90+2' | Summary | Akamine 35'; Muto 90+5' | Attendance: 30,944; Referee: (Japan) Hajime Matsuo |

=== J.League Cup ===
| Team | Pld | W | D | L | GF | GA | GD | Pts |
|---|---|---|---|---|---|---|---|---|
| Cerezo Osaka | 6 | 4 | 0 | 2 | 15 | 7 | +8 | 12 |
| Vegalta Sendai | 6 | 4 | 0 | 2 | 11 | 5 | +6 | 12 |
| Júbilo Iwata | 6 | 4 | 0 | 2 | 10 | 11 | −1 | 12 |
| Urawa Red Diamonds | 6 | 3 | 0 | 3 | 12 | 10 | +2 | 9 |
| Sagan Tosu | 6 | 3 | 0 | 3 | 8 | 16 | −8 | 9 |
| Sanfrecce Hiroshima | 6 | 1 | 1 | 4 | 8 | 11 | −3 | 4 |
| Kawasaki Frontale | 6 | 1 | 1 | 4 | 7 | 11 | −4 | 4 |

| 20 March 2012 Group A | Urawa Red Diamonds | 1–0 | Vegalta Sendai | Saitama |
| 15:01 JST | Nagata 49'; Špiranović (yellow card) 45+2' (yellow-red card) 81'; Takahashi (yellow card) 56' | (Report) | (yellow card) 42' Tamura; (yellow card) 65' Nakahara | Stadium: Saitama Stadium 2002; Attendance: 23,076; Referee: (Japan) Takuto Okabe |

| 4 April 2012 Group A | Vegalta Sendai | 2–0 | Sagan Tosu | Sendai |
| 19:03 JST | Matsushita 51'; Kakuda 62'; Akamine (yellow card) 90+1' | (Report) | (yellow card) 35' Tozin; (red card) 65' Yoon (Manager) | Stadium: Yurtec Stadium Sendai; Attendance: 7,236; Referee: (Japan) Tetsuro Yoshida |

| 18 April 2012 Group A | Kawasaki Frontale | 3–1 | Vegalta Sendai | Kawasaki |
| 19:00 JST | Saneto (yellow card) 27' (yellow-red card) 54'; Tasaka 45+1'; Kobayashi 45+3', 57' | (Report) | (yellow card) 48' Tamura; (yellow card) 72' Muto; 90' Muto | Stadium: Kawasaki Todoroki Stadium; Attendance: 8,186; Referee: (Japan) Hajime Matsuo |

| 6 June 2012 Group A | Sanfrecce Hiroshima | 1–3 | Vegalta Sendai | Asaminami-ku, Hiroshima |
| 19:00 JST | Shimizu 24' | Report | Nakahara 56', 76'; Wilson 65' | Stadium: Hiroshima Big Arch; Attendance: 7,234; Referee: (Japan) Minoru Tojo |

| 9 June 2012 Group A | Vegalta Sendai | 1–0 | Cerezo Osaka | Sendai |
| 17:00 JST | Tamura (yellow card) 53'; Ryang Yong-Gi 63' | Report | Kempes (yellow card) 10' | Stadium: Yurtec Stadium Sendai; Attendance: 8,638; Referee: (Japan) Yoshiro Imamura |

| 27 June 2012 Group A | Vegalta Sendai | 4–0 | Júbilo Iwata | Sendai |
| 20:00 JST | Ota 23'; Kakuda (yellow card) 40'; Wilson 56'; Akamine 69'; Watanabe 78' | Report | Yamamoto (yellow card) 53'; Fujita (yellow card) 90+5' | Stadium: Yurtec Stadium Sendai; Attendance: 9,865; Referee: (Japan) Hiroyuki Kimura |

=== Quarter-finals ===
| 25 July 2012 First leg | Vegalta Sendai | 2–2 | F.C. Tokyo | Sendai |
| 19:04 JST | Tamura 32', (yellow card) 42'; Kamata (yellow card) 44'; Wilson 50'; Watanabe (yellow card) 59' | (Report) | 16' Watanabe; 30' Ishikawa; (yellow card) 90+1' Kaga | Stadium: Yurtec Stadium Sendai; Attendance: 8,873; Referee: (England) Darren Deadman |

| 8 August 2012 Second leg | F.C. Tokyo | 2–0 (4–2 agg.) | Vegalta Sendai | Tokyo |
| 20:00 JST | Tanabe (yellow card) 30'; Yazawa (yellow card) 42'; Ishikawa 81'; Watanabe 90+3' | Report | Wilson (yellow card) 37'; Uchiyama (yellow card) 51'; Kamata (yellow card) 62'; Park Ju-Sung (yellow card) 73' | Stadium: Ajinomoto Stadium; Attendance: 10,573; Referee: (Japan) Kenji Ogiya |

=== Emperor's Cup ===
| 8 September 2012 Round 2 | Vegalta Sendai | 1–0 | Sony Sendai F.C. | Sendai |
| 13:00 | Okuno 39' | Summary | | Stadium: Yurtec Stadium Sendai |

| 10 October 2012 Round 3 | Vegalta Sendai | 1–2 (a.e.t.) | Roasso Kumamoto | Sendai |
| 19:00 | Watanabe 64' | Report | Saito 48'; Yabu 119' | Stadium: Yurtec Stadium Sendai; Attendance: 4,269; Referee: Yuichi Nishimura |
