= 2012 Gamba Osaka season =

Gamba Osaka
2012 season
- Chairman: Kikuo Kanamori
- Manager: José Carlos Serrão; Masanobu Matsunami(from 26 March)
- J. League: 17th
- Emperor's Cup: Quarter-final
- J. League Cup: Quarter-final
- AFC Champions League: Group stage
Home colours	Away colours

The 2012 Gamba Osaka season was Gamba Osaka's 20th season in the J. League Division 1 and 26th overall in the Japanese top flight. It also includes the 2012 J. League Cup, 2012 Emperor's Cup, and the 2012 AFC Champions League.

== Competitions ==
=== J. League ===
==== League table ====
Pos	Team	Pld	W	D	L	GF	GA	GD	Pts	Qualification or relegation
14	Cerezo Osaka	34	11	9	14	47	53	−6	42	
15	Albirex Niigata	34	10	10	14	29	34	−5	40	
16	Vissel Kobe (R)	34	11	6	17	41	50	−9	39	Relegation to 2013 J.League Division 2
17	Gamba Osaka (R)	34	9	11	14	67	65	+2	38	Relegation to 2013 J.League Division 2
18	Consadole Sapporo (R)	34	4	2	28	25	88	−63	14	Relegation to 2013 J.League Division 2

Updated to match(es) played on 1 December 2012. Source: J.League Division 1
Rules for classification: 1) points; 2) goal difference; 3) number of goals scored.
(R) Relegated

==== Matches ====
10 March 2012 1	Gamba Osaka	2–3	Vissel Kobe	Expo '70 Commemorative Stadium
Saturday 14:04	Paulinho 34'; Rafinha 90+2'	Report	17', 76' Okubo; 59' Hashimoto	Attendance: 17,066; Referee: Takayama

17 March 2012 2	Cerezo Osaka	2–1	Gamba Osaka	Osaka Nagai Stadium
Saturday 14:04	Branquinho 19'; Kempes 90+4'	Report	27' Paulinho	Attendance: 30,764; Referee: Yoshida

25 March 2012 3	Gamba Osaka	1–2	Jubilo Iwata	Expo '70 Commemorative Stadium
Sunday 19:03	Kurata 84'	Report	23' Yamamoto; 60' Maeda	Attendance: 15,072; Referee: Iemoto

31 March 2012 4	Albirex Niigata	1–1	Gamba Osaka	Tohoku Denryoku Big Swan Stadium
Saturday 16:03	Alan Mineiro 5'	Report	22' Rafinha	Attendance: 16,836; Referee: Ogiya

7 April 2012 5	Sanfrecce Hiroshima	4–1	Gamba Osaka	Hiroshima Big Arch
Saturday 20:00 JST	Satō 10' 33' (pen.); Hirashige 85', 88'	Report	Sato 48'	Attendance: 12,318; Referee: Yudai Yamamoto

14 April 2012 6	Gamba Osaka	3–2	Kawasaki Frontale	Expo '70 Commemorative Stadium
Saturday 20:00 JST	Endō (yellow card) 32'; Nakazawa 45+1'; Sato 68'; Hiroyuki Abe 85'; Kaji (yellow card) 89'	Report	Tasaka 1' (yellow card) 90+3'; Kobayashi 30'; Morishita (yellow card) 36'; Komiyama (yellow card) 45'; Jeci (yellow card) 84'	Attendance: 17,134; Referee: Hiroyuki Kimura

22 April 2012 7	Gamba Osaka	3–1	Shimizu S-Pulse	Expo '70 Commemorative Stadium
Saturday 20:00 JST	Takei 20'; Rafinha 27' (pen.); Sato (yellow card) 57' (goal) 81'	Report	Akihiro Hayashi (yellow card) 26'; Lee Ki-Je (yellow card) 42'; Ono (yellow card) 54'; Brosque 90+3'	Attendance: 8,548; Referee: Tomohiro Inoue

28 April 2012 8	Kashima Antlers	5–0	Gamba Osaka	Kashima Soccer Stadium
Saturday 16:30 JST	Endo 42'; Koroki 54'; Osako 72', 90+3'; Aoki (yellow card) 87'; Motoyama 90'	Report	Endō (yellow card) 50'; Kurata (yellow card) 70'; Paulinho (yellow card) 85'; Lee Seung-Yeoul (yellow card) 88'	Attendance: 17,583; Referee: Ryuji Sato

6 May 2012 9	Omiya Ardija	1–0	Gamba Osaka	NACK5 Stadium Omiya
Saturday 18:00 JST	Fukaya (yellow card) 7'; Aoki (yellow card) 57'; Cho Young-Cheol 74'	Report	Terada (yellow card) 15'	Attendance: 11,554; Referee: Hajime Matsuo

12 May 2012 10	Gamba Osaka	1–1	Vegalta Sendai	Expo '70 Commemorative Stadium
Saturday 20:00 JST	Paulinho (yellow card) 18'; Kurata 62'	Report	Kamata (yellow card) 16'; Uemoto (yellow card) 64'; Tamura (yellow card) 65'; Akamine 78'	Attendance: 15,253; Referee: Yudai Yamamoto

19 May 2012 11	Yokohama F. Marinos	0–0	Gamba Osaka	Nissan Stadium
Saturday 15:00 JST	Ono (yellow card) 89'	Report	Paulinho (yellow card) 45+2'; Niwa (yellow card) 60'	Attendance: 25,241; Referee: Jumpei Iida

25 May 2012 12	Gamba Osaka	2–3	Sagan Tosu	Expo '70 Commemorative Stadium
Friday 20:00 JST	Futagawa 3'; Sato 67'	Report	Okamoto (yellow card) 9'; Hayasaka (yellow card) 10'; Tozin (yellow card) 40'; Toyoda 68'; Fujita 86', 90+4'	Attendance: 8,218; Referee: Takuto Okabe

16 June 2012 13	Gamba Osaka	1–2	Urawa Red Diamonds	Expo '70 Commemorative Stadium
Saturday 20:00 JST	Sato 16'	Report	Haraguchi 29'; Umesaki 90+2'	Attendance: 14,977; Referee: Hiroyoshi Takayama

23 June 2012 14	Consadole Sapporo	0–4	Gamba Osaka	Sapporo Dome
Saturday 15:00 JST	Hidaka (yellow card) 31'; Kawai (yellow card) 83'	Report	Paulinho 16'; Kurata 26'; Endō 35' (pen.); Uchida (yellow card) 37'; Takei 90+3'	Attendance: 14,759; Referee: Tomoya Maeda

27 June 2012 15	Gamba Osaka	2–2	Nagoya Grampus	Expo '70 Commemorative Stadium
Wednesday 20:00 JST	Nakazawa 25'; Futagawa 73'	Report	Nagai 8', 18'	Attendance: 10,840; Referee: Yuichi Nishimura

30 June 2012 16	Gamba Osaka	2–6	Kashiwa Reysol	Expo '70 Commemorative Stadium
Saturday 20:00 JST	Endō 35'; Sato 45+1'; Kurata (yellow card) 90+5'	Report	Sawa 3', 7', 68' (yellow card) 26'; Kudo 20'; Masushima (yellow card) 48'; Domingues 56'; Tanaka 90+2'	Attendance: 14,006; Referee: Kenji Ogiya

7 July 2012 17	FC Tokyo	3–2	Gamba Osaka	Ajinomoto Stadium
Saturday 19:30 JST	Nakamura 3'; Lucas 17', 44'; Gonda (yellow card) 30'	Report	31' (pen.) Endō; (yellow card) 35' Takei; (yellow card) 59' Kim; 62' (yellow card) 77' Sato; (yellow card) 67' Abe	Attendance: 24,633; Referee: Jumpei Iida

14 July 2012 18	Gamba Osaka	1–2	Yokohama F. Marinos	Expo '70 Commemorative Stadium
Saturday 20:00 JST	Endō (yellow card) 56'; Niwa (yellow card) 74'; Paulinho 88'	Report	Kurihara (yellow card) 22'; Tomisawa 44'; Nakazawa (yellow card) 47'; Nakamura (yellow card) 60'; Saito 90+4'	Attendance: 14,966; Referee: Hiroyuki Kimura

28 July 2012 19	Vissel Kobe	1–1	Gamba Osaka	Home's Stadium Kobe
Saturday 20:00 JST	Ōkubo 77'	Report	Futagawa 69'	Attendance: 17,471; Referee: Itaru Hirose

4 August 2012 20	Gamba Osaka	3–1	Omiya Ardija	Expo '70 Commemorative Stadium
Saturday 20:00 JST	Kurata (yellow card) 58' (goal) 71'; Leandro 64' (pen.), 65' (yellow card) 66'	Report	Carlinhos Paraíba (yellow card) 38'; Hasegawa 52' (yellow card) 64'; Ezumi (yellow card) 62'; Ljubijankič (yellow card) 72'	Attendance: 12,964; Referee: (Japan) Minoru Tojo

11 August 2012 21	Gamba Osaka	2–2	Cerezo Osaka	Expo '70 Commemorative Stadium
Saturday 20:00 JST	Sato 53', 62'	Report	Kempes (yellow card) 13'; Edamura 28', 50'; Fábio Simplício (yellow card) 38'; Sakemoto (yellow card) 45'; Yokoyama (yellow card) 82'	Attendance: 18,578; Referee: (Japan) Tomoya Maeda

18 August 2012 22	Nagoya Grampus	0–5	Gamba Osaka	Mizuho Athletic Stadium
Saturday 20:00 JST	Daniel (yellow card) 11'; Masukawa (red card) 42'	Report	Niwa (yellow card) 14'; Leandro 38'; Endō 43' (pen.); Myojin (yellow card) 50'; Konno 68'; Sato 70'; Paulinho 83'	Attendance: 30,354; Referee: (Japan) Masaaki Iemoto

25 August 2012 23	Gamba Osaka	7–2	Consadole Sapporo	Expo '70 Commemorative Stadium
Saturday 20:00 JST	Sato 16'; Leandro 26', 45', 57'; Konno 68'; Ienaga 90+3'	Report	Hidaka 18'; Kim Jae-Hoan (yellow card) 53'; Uehara 71'	Attendance: 15,056; Referee: (Japan) Itaru Hirose

1 September 2012 24	Sagan Tosu	4–1	Gamba Osaka	Tosu Stadium
Saturday 20:00 JST	Fujita 2'; Okamoto (yellow card) 34'; Kim Min-Woo (yellow card) 44'; Toyoda 45', 52'; Kobayashi 89'	Summary	Myojin (yellow card) 74'	Attendance: 19,729; Referee: (Japan) Hiroyuki Kimura

15 September 2012 25	Gamba Osaka	1–1	Albirex Niigata	Expo '70 Commemorative Stadium
20:00	Leandro 15' (yellow card) 17'	Summary	Michael (yellow card) 40'; Bruno Lopes 90+1' (yellow card) 90+5'	Attendance: 17,381; Referee: (Japan) Ryuji Sato

22 September 2012 26	Urawa Red Diamonds	0–5	Gamba Osaka	Saitama Stadium 2002
17:00	Makino (yellow card) 40'; Suzuki (yellow card) 55'	Summary	Abe 19'; Ienaga (yellow card) 26'; Leandro 37', 60'; Omori (yellow card) 69'; Paulinho 86', 90+2'	Attendance: 46,046; Referee: (Japan) Kenji Ogiya

29 September 2012 27	Gamba Osaka	2–2	Kashima Antlers	Expo '70 Commemorative Stadium
17:00 JST	Abe (yellow card) 7'; Leandro 25', 90+2'	Summary	Renato Cajá 10' (yellow card) 64'; Dutra (yellow card) 15' (goal) 39'; Iwamasa (yellow card) 62'	Attendance: 14,163; Referee: (Japan) Yudai Yamamoto

6 October 2012 28	Vegalta Sendai	2–1	Gamba Osaka	Yurtec Stadium Sendai
20:00	Wilson (yellow card) 18'; Sugai (yellow card) 51'; Ryang Yong-Gi 76'; Nakahara 82'	Summary	Sato (yellow card) 62'; Paulinho 90'	Attendance: 18,003; Referee: (Japan) Hiroyuki Kimura

20 October 2012 29	Kawasaki Frontale	2–3	Gamba Osaka	Todoroki Athletics Stadium
16:00	Kusukami 58'; Tanaka (yellow card) 62'; Nakamura 72'	Summary	Ienaga 21', 76'; Kurata (yellow card) 37'; Konno (yellow card) 52'; Fujiharu 64'; Sasaki (yellow card) 90+3'	Attendance: 18,779; Referee: (Japan) Tomohiro Inoue

27 October 2012 30	Gamba Osaka	1–1	Sanfrecce Hiroshima	Expo '70 Commemorative Stadium
15:00	Fujiharu (yellow card) 21'; Endō 56'; Futagawa (yellow card) 71'	Summary	Kazuyuki Morisaki 76'	Attendance: 17,617; Referee: (Japan) Toshimitsu Yoshida

7 November 2012 31	Kashiwa Reysol	2–2	Gamba Osaka	Hitachi Kashiwa Soccer Stadium
19:00	Kudo 12', 45'; Otani (yellow card) 31'; Fujita (yellow card) 34'; Masushima (yellow card) 43'	Summary	Leandro 37', 90' (yellow card) 70'	Attendance: 10,389; Referee: (Japan) Hajime Matsuo

17 November 2012 32	Shimizu S-Pulse	1–3	Gamba Osaka	Outsourcing Stadium Nihondaira
15:00	Omae 48'	Summary	Kurata 24', 64'; Leandro 52'	Attendance: 12,391; Referee: (Japan) Hiroyuki Kimura

24 November 2012 33	Gamba Osaka	2–2	FC Tokyo	Expo '70 Commemorative Stadium

1 December 2012 34	Júbilo Iwata	2–1	Gamba Osaka	Yamaha Stadium

=== J. League Cup ===
==== Quarter-finals ====
25 July 2012 First leg	Gamba Osaka	1–3	Kashiwa Reysol	Osaka
20:00	Konno (yellow card) 12'; Kurata (yellow card) 53'; Daiki Niwa 83'	Report	Kudo 47'; Kurisawa (yellow card) 60'; Leandro Domingues 76', 90+5'; Sawa (yellow card) 82'; Barada (yellow card) 90'; Sugeno (yellow card) 90+5'	Stadium: Osaka Expo '70 Stadium; Attendance: 7,083; Referee: Toshimitsu Yoshida

8 August 2012 Second leg	Kashiwa Reysol	2–1 (5–2 agg.)	Gamba Osaka	Kashiwa, Chiba
19:00	Leandro Domingues 17'; Kudo 60'	Report	Sato 30'; Leandro (yellow card) 77'	Stadium: Hitachi Kashiwa Soccer Stadium; Attendance: 6,910; Referee: (Japan) Jumpei Iida

=== Emperor's Cup ===
8 September 2012 Round 2	Gamba Osaka	3–0	Kansai University	Suita
13:00	Yokotani 2'; Myojin 39'; Abe 47'	Report		Stadium: Osaka Expo '70 Stadium; Attendance: 2,227; Referee: Junpei Iida

10 October 2012 Round 3	Gamba Osaka	1–0	Mito HollyHock	Suita
19:00	Leandro 62'	Report		Stadium: Osaka Expo '70 Stadium; Attendance: 2,537; Referee: Tetsuro Yoshida

15 December 2012 Round 4	Gamba Osaka	3–2	Machida Zelvia	Suita
13:00	Kurata 38'; Iwashita 65'; Endõ 80'	Report	Kitai 27'; Suzuki 56'	Stadium: Osaka Expo '70 Stadium; Attendance: 4,576; Referee: Yamamoto

23 December 2012 Quarter Final	Cerezo Osaka	1–2 (a.e.t.)	Gamba Osaka	Osaka
13:00	Kakitani 49'	Report	Endō 19'; Ienaga 112'	Stadium: Nagai Stadium; Attendance: 21,407; Referee: Matsuo

=== AFC Champions League ===
Pos	Team	Pld	W	D	L	GF	GA	GD	Pts	Qualification	ADE	BYD	POH	GMB
1	(Australia) Adelaide United	6	4	1	1	7	2	+5	13	Advance to knockout stage	—	0–0	1–0	2–0
2	(Uzbekistan) Bunyodkor	6	3	1	2	8	7	+1	10	Advance to knockout stage	1–2	—	1–0	3–2
3	(South Korea) Pohang Steelers	6	3	0	3	6	4	+2	9		1–0	0–2	—	2–0
4	(Japan) Gamba Osaka	6	1	0	5	5	13	−8	3		0–2	3–1	0–3	—

Source: WorldFootball.net

6 March 2012 Group stage	Gamba Osaka (Japan)	0–3	(South Korea) Pohang Steelers	Osaka Expo '70 Stadium, Osaka
19:00 UTC+09:00		Report	Kim Tae-Su 19'; Rendulić 22'; Asamoah 76'	Attendance: 9,101; Referee: Abdulrahman Abdou (Qatar)

20 March 2012 Group stage	Adelaide United (Australia)	2–0	(Japan) Gamba Osaka	Hindmarsh Stadium, Adelaide
19:30 UTC+10:30	Mullen 17', 24'	Report		Attendance: 5,112; Referee: Mohamed Al Zarooni (UAE)

3 April 2012 Group stage	Gamba Osaka (Japan)	3–1	(Uzbekistan) Bunyodkor	Osaka Expo '70 Stadium, Osaka
19:00 UTC+09:00	Endo 14'; Rafinha 58' ((pen.)), 77' ((pen.))		Soliev 89'	Attendance: 6,100; Referee: Chaiya Mahabap (Thailand)

18 April 2012 Group stage	Bunyodkor (Uzbekistan)	3–2	(Japan) Gamba Osaka	JAR Stadium, Tashkent
17:00 UTC+05:00	Murzoev 14'; Turaev 42'; Filiposyan (yellow card) 60'; Soliev 85'	Report	Kurata 18'; Hiroyuki Abe (footballer) 90+4'	Attendance: 4,000; Referee: (Saudi Arabia) Khalil Al Ghamdi

2 May 2012 Group stage	Pohang Steelers (South Korea)	2–0	(Japan) Gamba Osaka	Pohang Steel Yard, Pohang
19:30 UTC+09:00	Park Hee-Chul (yellow card) 21'; Kim Jin-Yong 45+1'; Shin Kwang-Hoon (yellow card) 71'; Asamoah 78' (yellow card) 78'	Report	Niwa (yellow card) 74'	Attendance: 3,825; Referee: (Iran) Mohammadreza Abolfazli

16 May 2012 Group stage	Gamba Osaka (Japan)	0–2	(Australia) Adelaide United	Osaka Expo '70 Stadium, Osaka
19:00 UTC+09:00		Report	van Dijk 65'; Djite (yellow card) 80'; Sato 87' (o.g.)	Attendance: 7,294; Referee: (Bahrain) Nawaf Shukralla
