= 2014 Vegalta Sendai season =

Vegalta Sendai
2014 season
- Chairman: Shirahata Yoichi
- Manager: Graham Arnold; Susumu Watanabe
- Stadium: Yurtec Stadium
- J.League Division 1: 14th
- Emperor's Cup: Second round
- J.League Cup: Group stage
Home colours	Away colours

The 2014 Vegalta Sendai season was Vegalta Sendai's fifth consecutive season and seventh season overall in J.League Division 1. Graham Arnold managed the team to start the season, but he parted ways with the club after taking just two points from the first six games. Arnold identified the advanced age of the Vegalta roster, with 17 players over the age of 30, as a factor in the team's poor performance and his split with management. Susumu Watanabe, a former assistant coach, succeeded Arnold as manager.

== Current players ==
As of 15 March 2014.

Note: Flags indicate national team as defined under FIFA eligibility rules; some limited exceptions apply. Players may hold more than one non-FIFA nationality.

No.	Pos.	Nation	Player
1	GK	JPN	Shigeru Sakurai
2	DF	JPN	Jiro Kamata
3	DF	JPN	Kodai Watanabe
4	DF	JPN	Koji Hachisuka
5	DF	JPN	Naoki Ishikawa
6	DF	JPN	Makoto Kakuda
8	MF	NZL	Michael McGlinchey (on loan from Central Coast Mariners)
9	FW	JPN	Takayuki Nakahara
10	MF	PRK	Ryang Yong-Gi
11	MF	JPN	Yoshiaki Ota
13	FW	JPN	Atsushi Yanagisawa (captain)
14	MF	JPN	Hayato Sasaki
15	MF	JPN	Norio Suzuki
16	GK	USA	Daniel Schmidt

No.	Pos.	Nation	Player
17	MF	JPN	Shingo Tomita
18	FW	BRA	Wilson
19	FW	JPN	Yuki Muto
20	MF	JPN	Kohei Hattanda
21	GK	JPN	Kentaro Seki
22	GK	AUS	Danny Vukovic (on loan from Perth Glory)
23	DF	JPN	Hiroshi Futami
24	FW	JPN	Shingo Akamine
25	MF	JPN	Naoki Sugai
26	MF	JPN	Keita Fujimura
27	MF	JPN	Takuya Takei
28	FW	JPN	Hiroki Yamamoto
29	DF	JPN	Taikai Uemoto
33	DF	JPN	Hironori Ishikawa

=== Out on loan ===
Note: Flags indicate national team as defined under FIFA eligibility rules; some limited exceptions apply. Players may hold more than one non-FIFA nationality.

No.	Pos.	Nation	Player
—	MF	JPN	Hiroaki Okuno (at V-Varen Nagasaki)

== Competitions ==
=== J.League ===
==== League table ====
Pos	Team	Pld	W	D	L	GF	GA	GD	Pts	Qualification or relegation
12	Albirex Niigata	34	12	8	14	30	36	−6	44	
13	Ventforet Kofu	34	9	14	11	27	31	−4	41	
14	Vegalta Sendai	34	9	11	14	35	50	−15	38	
15	Shimizu S-Pulse	34	10	6	18	42	60	−18	36	
16	Omiya Ardija (R)	34	9	8	17	44	60	−16	35	Relegation to 2015 J2 League

Updated to match(es) played on 8 December 2014. Source: J.League Data
Rules for classification: 1) points; 2) goal difference; 3) number of goals scored.
(R) Relegated

==== Matches ====
1 March 2014 1	Vegalta Sendai	1–2	Albirex Niigata	Sendai
14:05 JST	Tomita 52'	Report	Léo Silva 39' (pen.); Roger Gaucho 89'	Stadium: Yurtec Stadium; Attendance: 15,852; Referee: Yudai Yamamoto

8 March 2014 2	Kashima Antlers	2–0	Vegalta Sendai	Kashima
19:04 JST	Endo 31', 90'	Report		Stadium: Kashima Soccer Stadium; Attendance: 15,033; Referee: Minoru Tōjō

15 March 2014 3	Vegalta Sendai	0–0	Gamba Osaka	Sendai
17:04 JST		Report		Stadium: Yurtec Stadium; Attendance: 13,380; Referee: Nobutsugu Murakami

23 March 2014 4	Omiya Ardija	4–0	Vegalta Sendai	Ōmiya-ku
15:03 JST	Watanabe 1'; Imai 45+1'; Ienaga 57' (pen.), 60'	Report		Stadium: NACK5 Stadium Omiya; Attendance: 10,465; Referee: Ryuji Sato

29 March 2014 5	Vegalta Sendai	1–1	Ventforet Kofu	Sendai
14:04 JST	Kakuda 37'	Report	Aoyama 77'	Stadium: Yurtec Stadium; Attendance: 11,144; Referee: Kazuyoshi Enomoto

6 April 2014 6	Urawa Red Diamonds	4–0	Vegalta Sendai	Saitama
19:04 JST	Lee 40', 66'; Ugajin 71'; Suzuki 80'	Report		Stadium: Saitama Stadium; Attendance: 26,762; Referee: Yuichi Nishimura

12 April 2014 7	Yokohama F. Marinos	0–2	Vegalta Sendai	Yokohama
14:04 JST		Report	Akamine 66', 81'	Stadium: International Stadium Yokohama; Attendance: 19,181; Referee: Hiroyuki Kimura

19 April 2014 8	Vegalta Sendai	0–3	Sagan Tosu	Sendai
14:04 JST		Report	Niwa 45'; Watanabe 59' (o.g.); Hayasaka 90'	Stadium: Yurtec Stadium; Attendance: 11,413; Referee: Kenji Ogiya

26 April 2014 9	Shimizu S-Pulse	1–0	Vegalta Sendai	Shizuoka
14:03 JST	Kawai 63'	Report		Stadium: Outsourcing Stadium Nihondaira; Attendance: 11,188; Referee: Yudai Yamamoto

29 April 2014 10	Vegalta Sendai	0–0	Kawasaki Frontale	Sendai
16:00 JST	Kakuda (yellow card) 43'; Ryang Yong-gi (yellow card) 90+3'	Report		Stadium: Yurtec Stadium; Attendance: 13,040; Referee: Ryuji Sato

3 May 2014 11	Tokushima Vortis	0–1	Vegalta Sendai	Naruto, Tokushima
14:00 JST	Tsuda (yellow card) 30'; Saito (yellow card) 77'; Fukumoto (yellow card) 87'	Summary	Takei (yellow card) 29'; Kamata (yellow card) 37'; Akamine 40'	Stadium: Pocarisweat Stadium; Attendance: 9,686; Referee: (Japan) Hajime Matsuo

6 May 2014 12	Vegalta Sendai	4–3	Vissel Kobe	Sendai
13:00 JST	Kakuda (yellow card) 1'; Watanabe (yellow card) 20'; Wilson 55' (pen.) 57'; Kamata (yellow card) 69'; Ota 74'; Muto 76'	Summary	Marquinhos 8'; Pedro Júnior 26' (yellow card) 59'; Ogawa 72'	Stadium: Yurtec Stadium; Attendance: 12,945; Referee: (Japan) Akihiko Ikeuchi

10 May 2014 13	Cerezo Osaka	0–1	Vegalta Sendai	Osaka
16:00 JST	Forlán (yellow card) 30'; Kačar (yellow card) 69'	Summary	Kamata (yellow card) 31'; Ryang Yong-gi 83'	Stadium: Kincho Stadium; Attendance: 15,479; Referee: (Japan) Kenji Ogiya

18 May 2014 14	Vegalta Sendai	1–0	Sanfrecce Hiroshima	Sendai
13:00 JST	Akamine 16'	Summary		Stadium: Yurtec Stadium; Attendance: 18,863; Referee: (Japan) Yuichi Nishimura

19 July 2014 15	Kashiwa Reysol	0–0	Vegalta Sendai	Kashiwa, Chiba
20:00 JST		Summary		Stadium: Hitachi Kashiwa Soccer Stadium; Attendance: 8,982; Referee: (Japan) Ryuji Sato

23 July 2014 16	Vegalta Sendai	3–3	Nagoya Grampus	Sendai
19:00 JST	Akamine 19'; Sugai 66'; Futami 82'	Summary	Taguchi 58'; Córdoba (yellow card) 65'; Yano 71'; Leandro Domingues 90+2'	Stadium: Yurtec Stadium; Attendance: 13,302; Referee: (Japan) Toshimitsu Yoshida

27 July 2014 17	FC Tokyo	3–0	Vegalta Sendai	Chōfu, Tokyo
18:30 JST	Hirayama 18'; Kawano 34'; Takahashi 43'	Summary	Wilson (yellow card) 20'; Ryang Yong-gi (yellow card) 72'	Stadium: Ajinomoto Stadium; Attendance: 15,491; Referee: (Japan) Takuya Maeda

2 August 2014 18	Vegalta Sendai	2–2	Omiya Ardija	Sendai
19:00 JST	Ryang Yong-gi 5'; Ishikawa 66'	Summary	Mrđa 14'; Kamata 72' (o.g.)	Stadium: Yurtec Stadium; Attendance: 14,931; Referee: (Japan) Futoshi Nakamura

9 August 2014 19	Ventforet Kofu	0–0	Vegalta Sendai	Kōfu, Yamanashi
18:30 JST		Summary		Stadium: Yamanashi Chuo Bank Stadium; Attendance: 8,523; Referee: (Japan) Nobutsugu Murakami

16 August 2014 20	Vegalta Sendai	3–2	Shimizu S-Pulse	Sendai
19:00 JST	Muto 12' 21'; Uemoto (yellow card) 45+1'; Kakuda (yellow card) 50'; Kamata 77'; Ishikawa (yellow card) 90'	Summary	Lee Ki-je (yellow card) 35'; Novaković 45+2'; Omae 49' (pen.) (yellow card) 87'; Sugiyama (yellow card) 56'; Takagi (yellow card) 82' (yellow-red card)	Stadium: Yurtec Stadium; Attendance: 14,252; Referee: (Japan) Maasaki Iemoto

23 August 2014 21	Vissel Kobe	2–1	Vegalta Sendai	Kobe
19:00 JST	Pedro Júnior 52'; Iwanami 67'	Summary	Kamata 36' (yellow card) 88'; Uemoto (yellow card) 55'	Stadium: Kobe City Misaki Park Stadium; Attendance: 13,329; Referee: (Japan) Yuichi Nishimura

30 August 2014 22	Vegalta Sendai	1–2	Yokohama F. Marinos	Sendai
19:00 JST	Sugai 31'; Wilson (yellow card) 55'	Summary	Kurihara 18'; Shimohira 90+3'	Stadium: Yurtec Stadium; Attendance: 17,468; Referee: (Japan) Ryuji Sato

13 September 2014 23	Albirex Niigata	1–0	Vegalta Sendai	Niigata
19:00	Tanaka (yellow card) 31'; Léo Silva 77' (yellow card) 90'	Summary	Takei (yellow card) 34'	Stadium: Denka Big Swan Stadium; Attendance: 23,981; Referee: (Japan) Yoshiro Imamura

20 September 2014 24	Sagan Tosu	2–1	Vegalta Sendai	Tosu, Saga
19:00	Sakai (yellow card) 48'; Niwa (yellow card) 59'; Toyoda 71'; Mizunuma 84'	Summary	Kamata (yellow card) 6'; Akamine 89'	Stadium: Tosu Stadium; Attendance: 10,231; Referee: (Japan) Jumpei Iida

23 September 2014 25	Vegalta Sendai	0–1	Kashima Antlers	Sendai
14:00	Ota (yellow card) 28'; Wilson (yellow card) 67'	Summary	Davi (yellow card) 35'; Ogasawara (yellow card) 39'; Doi 44'	Stadium: Yurtec Stadium; Attendance: 17,006; Referee: (Japan) Takuto Okabe

27 September 2014 26	Kawasaki Frontale	1–1	Vegalta Sendai	Kawasaki, Kanagawa
20:00	Paulinho (yellow card) 24'; Nakamura (yellow card) 68'; Tanaka (yellow card) 84'; Morishima 90'	Summary	Wilson 42'	Stadium: Todoroki Athletics Stadium; Attendance: 18,127; Referee: (Japan) Kazuyoshi Enomoto

5 October 2014 27	Vegalta Sendai	1–0	FC Tokyo	Sendai
15:30	Sugai (yellow card) 50'; Akamine 75'; Ishikawa (yellow card) 90'	Summary	Morishige (yellow card) 27'; Edu (yellow card) 77' (yellow-red card)	Stadium: Yurtec Stadium; Attendance: 13,699; Referee: (Japan) Yosuke Kubota

18 October 2014 28	Vegalta Sendai	v	Urawa Red Diamonds	Sendai
14:00				Stadium: Yurtec Stadium

=== J.League Cup ===
19 March 2014 Group stage	Shimizu S-Pulse	4–0	Vegalta Sendai	Shizuoka
19:04 JST	Nagasawa 21'; Omae 32'; Novaković 68', 74'	Report		Stadium: Outsourcing Stadium Nihondaira; Attendance: 5,291; Referee: Toshimitsu Yoshida

2 April 2014 Group stage	Vegalta Sendai	1–1	FC Tokyo	Sendai
19:03 JST	Kamata 62'	Report	Edu 77' (pen.)	Stadium: Yurtec Stadium; Attendance: 7,094; Referee: David Coote

16 April 2014 Group stage	Vegalta Sendai	1–2	Kashima Antlers	Sendai
19:00 JST	Muto 60'	Report	Nozawa 41'; Akasaki 83'	Stadium: Yurtec Stadium; Attendance: 7,583; Referee: Takuya Maeda

24 May 2014 Group stage	Sagan Tosu	2–0	Vegalta Sendai	Saga Athletic Stadium, Saga
15:00	Taniguchi 32' (pen.); Kiyotake 57'			Attendance: 4,097; Referee: Futoshi Nakamura

28 May 2014 Group stage	Vegalta Sendai	1–0	Gamba Osaka	Yurtec Stadium Sendai, Sendai
19:03	Akamine 66'			Attendance: 7,965; Referee: Hiroyuki Kimura

1 June 2014 Group stage	Vissel Kobe	2–1	Vegalta Sendai	Noevir Stadium Kobe, Hyōgo-ku, Kobe
Sunday 15:00	Morioka 1'; Pedro Jùnior 90+3'		Fujimura 37'	Attendance: 11,044; Referee: Nobutsugu Murakami

=== Emperor's Cup ===
12 July 2014 Round 2	Vegalta Sendai	1–2	Nara Club	Izumi-ku, Sendai
21:00	Yangisawa 33'	Report	Yusuke Ono 75'; Okayama 88'	Stadium: Yurtec Stadium Sendai; Attendance: 3,672; Referee: (Japan) Hajime Matsuo

== Statistics ==
=== Appearances and goals ===
As of match played 29 April 2014.

No.	Pos	Nat	Player	Total		J-League		J-League Cup		Emperor's Cup	
No.	Pos	Nat	Player	Apps	Goals	Apps	Goals	Apps	Goals	Apps	Goals
1	GK	(Japan) JPN	Shigeru Sakurai	1	0	0+0	0	1+0	0	0+0	0
2	DF	(Japan) JPN	Jiro Kamata	11	1	8+0	0	3+0	1	0+0	0
3	DF	(Japan) JPN	Kodai Watanabe	12	0	9+0	0	3+0	0	0+0	0
4	DF	(Japan) JPN	Koji Hachisuka	0	0	0+0	0	0+0	0	0+0	0
5	DF	(Japan) JPN	Naoki Ishikawa	12	0	10+0	0	1+1	0	0+0	0
6	DF	(Japan) JPN	Makoto Kakuda	7	1	6+0	1	1+0	0	0+0	0
8	MF	(New Zealand) NZL	Michael McGlinchey	9	0	2+4	0	2+1	0	0+0	0
9	FW	(Japan) JPN	Takayuki Nakahara	2	0	0+1	0	0+1	0	0+0	0
10	MF	(North Korea) PRK	Ryang Yong-Gi	12	0	10+0	0	2+0	0	0+0	0
11	MF	(Japan) JPN	Yoshiaki Ota	12	0	9+1	0	2+0	0	0+0	0
13	FW	(Japan) JPN	Atsushi Yanagisawa	2	0	2+0	0	0+0	0	0+0	0
14	MF	(Japan) JPN	Hayato Sasaki	5	0	1+2	0	1+1	0	0+0	0
15	DF	(Japan) JPN	Norio Suzuki	4	0	0+2	0	2+0	0	0+0	0
16	GK	(United States) USA	Daniel Schmidt	0	0	0+0	0	0+0	0	0+0	0
17	MF	(Japan) JPN	Shingo Tomita	13	1	10+0	1	2+1	0	0+0	0
18	FW	(Brazil) BRA	Wilson	9	0	8+0	0	1+0	0	0+0	0
19	FW	(Japan) JPN	Yuki Muto	12	1	4+5	0	3+0	1	0+0	0
20	MF	(Japan) JPN	Kohei Hattanda	1	0	0+0	0	1+0	0	0+0	0
21	GK	(Japan) JPN	Kentaro Seki	10	0	10+0	0	0+0	0	0+0	0
22	GK	(Australia) AUS	Danny Vukovic	2	0	0+0	0	2+0	0	0+0	0
23	DF	(Japan) JPN	Hiroshi Futami	7	0	5+0	0	1+1	0	0+0	0
24	FW	(Japan) JPN	Shingo Akamine	11	2	5+4	2	2+0	0	0+0	0
25	MF	(Japan) JPN	Naoki Sugai	8	0	8+0	0	0+0	0	0+0	0
26	MF	(Japan) JPN	Keita Fujimura	0	0	0+0	0	0+0	0	0+0	0
27	MF	(Japan) JPN	Takuya Takei	8	0	2+3	0	2+1	0	0+0	0
28	FW	(Japan) JPN	Hiroki Yamamoto	4	0	0+2	0	0+2	0	0+0	0
29	DF	(Japan) JPN	Taikai Uemoto	0	0	0+0	0	0+0	0	0+0	0
33	DF	(Japan) JPN	Hironori Ishikawa	3	0	1+1	0	1+0	0	0+0	0

== Honours ==
=== J.League Monthly MVP ===
Month	J1	
Month	Player	Source
May	Shingo Akamine	
