= 2009 Vegalta Sendai season =

Vegalta Sendai
2009 season
- Chairman: Shirahata Yoichi
- Manager: Makoto Teguramori
- Stadium: Yurtec Stadium Sendai
- J.League Division 2: 1st (promoted)
- Emperor's Cup: Semi-finals
- Top goalscorer: League: Marcelo Soares (16); All: Marcelo Soares
Home colours	Away colours

During the 2009 season, Vegalta Sendai competed in the J.League Division 2, the second tier of the Japanese football league system. Sendai finished 1st with a total of 106 points, the most points amassed by any team in J2 league history. The club also competed in the Emperor's Cup, being eliminated by Gamba Osaka at the semi-final stage.

== J.League Division 2. ==
=== League table ===
Pos	Team	Pld	W	D	L	GF	GA	GD	Pts	Promotion
1	Vegalta Sendai (C, P)	51	32	10	9	87	39	+48	106	Promotion to 2010 J. League Division 1
2	Cerezo Osaka (P)	51	31	11	9	100	53	+47	104	Promotion to 2010 J. League Division 1
3	Shonan Bellmare (P)	51	29	11	11	84	52	+32	98	Promotion to 2010 J. League Division 1
4	Ventforet Kofu	51	28	13	10	76	46	+30	97	
5	Sagan Tosu	51	25	13	13	71	51	+20	88	

Updated to match(es) played on December 5, 2009. Source: J.League Division 2
Rules for classification: 1) points; 2) goal difference; 3) number of goals scored.
(C) Champions; (P) Promoted

== Player statistics ==
No.	Pos.	Player	D.o.B. (Age)	Height / Weight	J. League 2		Emperor's Cup		Total	
No.	Pos.	Player	D.o.B. (Age)	Height / Weight	Apps	Goals	Apps	Goals	Apps	Goals
1	GK	Tatsuro Hagihara	August 6, 1982 (aged 26)	cm / kg	0	0				
2	DF	Kosuke Kitani	October 9, 1978 (aged 30)	cm / kg	2	0				
3	DF	Kodai Watanabe	December 4, 1986 (aged 22)	cm / kg	50	3				
4	DF	Junya Hosokawa	June 24, 1984 (aged 24)	cm / kg	0	0				
5	DF	Yugo Ichiyanagi	April 2, 1985 (aged 23)	cm / kg	18	2				
6	DF	Elizeu	October 21, 1979 (aged 29)	cm / kg	51	7				
7	MF	Naoki Chiba	July 24, 1977 (aged 31)	cm / kg	40	5				
8	MF	Atsushi Nagai	December 23, 1974 (aged 34)	cm / kg	40	0				
9	FW	Takayuki Nakahara	November 18, 1984 (aged 24)	cm / kg	36	10				
10	MF	Ryang Yong-Gi	January 7, 1982 (aged 27)	cm / kg	51	14				
11	MF	Kunimitsu Sekiguchi	December 26, 1985 (aged 23)	cm / kg	50	4				
13	FW	Yuki Nakashima	June 16, 1984 (aged 24)	cm / kg	38	8				
14	FW	Tomoyuki Hirase	May 23, 1977 (aged 31)	cm / kg	40	8				
15	FW	Kohei Tanaka	December 11, 1985 (aged 23)	cm / kg	16	1				
16	GK	Takuto Hayashi	August 9, 1982 (aged 26)	cm / kg	51	0				
17	MF	Shingo Tomita	June 20, 1986 (aged 22)	cm / kg	34	0				
18	FW	Marcelo Soares	March 9, 1982 (aged 26)	cm / kg	34	16				
19	FW	Dan Suzuki	March 9, 1989 (aged 19)	cm / kg	0	0				
19	FW	Sales	June 9, 1986 (aged 22)	cm / kg	12	2				
20	MF	Takahisa Nishiyama	July 11, 1985 (aged 23)	cm / kg	5	0				
21	GK	Kentaro Seki	March 9, 1986 (aged 22)	cm / kg	0	0				
22	GK	Shigeru Sakurai	June 29, 1979 (aged 29)	cm / kg	0	0				
23	MF	Naoya Tamura	November 20, 1984 (aged 24)	cm / kg	23	1				
25	MF	Naoki Sugai	September 21, 1984 (aged 24)	cm / kg	49	3				
26	MF	Keita Sogabe	July 2, 1988 (aged 20)	cm / kg	0	0				
27	DF	Park Joo-Sung	February 20, 1984 (aged 25)	cm / kg	34	2				
28	MF	Junichi Misawa	May 21, 1985 (aged 23)	cm / kg	2	0				
29	DF	Toshio Shimakawa	May 28, 1990 (aged 18)	cm / kg	0	0				
30	MF	Satoshi Hida	April 18, 1984 (aged 24)	cm / kg	0	0				
31	MF	Daisuke Saito	August 29, 1980 (aged 28)	cm / kg	36	0				

== Other pages ==
- (in Japanese) J. League official site
