= 2010 Vegalta Sendai season =

Vegalta Sendai
2010 season
- Chairman: Shirahata Yoichi
- Manager: Makoto Teguramori
- Stadium: Yurtec Stadium Sendai
- J1 League: 14th
- J.League Cup: Quarter-final
- Emperor's Cup: Second round
- Top goalscorer: League: Ryang Yong-gi; All: Ryang Yong-gi
Home colours	Away colours

2010 Vegalta Sendai season.

== Competitions ==
Competitions	Position
J. League 1	14th / 18 clubs
Emperor's Cup	2nd Round
J. League Cup	Quarterfinals

=== J. League 1 ===
==== League table ====
Pos	Team	Pld	W	D	L	GF	GA	GD	Pts	Qualification or relegation
12	Omiya Ardija	34	11	9	14	39	45	−6	42	
13	Montedio Yamagata	34	11	9	14	29	42	−13	42	
14	Vegalta Sendai	34	10	9	15	40	46	−6	39	
15	Vissel Kobe	34	9	11	14	37	45	−8	38	
16	FC Tokyo (R)	34	8	12	14	36	41	−5	36	Relegation to 2011 J.League Division 2

Updated to match(es) played on December 4, 2010. Source: J.League Division 1
Rules for classification: 1) points; 2) goal difference; 3) number of goals scored.
(R) Relegated

==== Results ====
J.League Division 1 results
Date	Opponent	Venue	Result F–A	Attendance
6 March 2010	Júbilo Iwata	Away	1–0	10,440
13 March 2010	Omiya Ardija	Home	3–1	17,978
20 March 2010	Kyoto Sanga	Away	1–2	8,177
28 March 2010	Gamba Osaka	Away	2–2	17,216
4 April 2010	Kashima Antlers	Home	2–1	23,214
11 April 2010	Shimizu S-Pulse	Away	1–5	17,522
17 April 2010	Vissel Kobe	Home	0–1	12,119
25 April 2010	Shonan Bellmare	Away	0–1	9,892
1 May 2010	Cerezo Osaka	Home	1–1	13,622
5 May 2010	FC Tokyo	Away	0–0	26,406
9 May 2010	Nagoya Grampus	Home	1–2	17,239
15 May 2010	Urawa Red Diamonds	Home	1–1	24,162
17 July 2010	Montedio Yamagata	Away	1–3	20,231
24 July 2010	Albirex Niigata	Home	2–3	17,281
27 July 2010	Sanfrecce Hiroshima	Home	1–1	12,139
1 August 2010	Kawasaki Frontale	Away	2–3	16,326
7 August 2010	Yokohama F. Marinos	Home	0–1	18,894
14 August 2010	Gamba Osaka	Home	1–3	17,651
17 August 2010	Urawa Red Diamonds	Away	1–1	32,231
22 August 2010	Omiya Ardija	Away	3–0	10,081
28 August 2010	Shonan Bellmare	Home	2–1	14,395
11 September 2010	Kashima Antlers	Away	0–1	16,869
19 September 2010	Montedio Yamagata	Home	2–0	26,391
25 September 2010	Yokohama F. Marinos	Away	1–0	20,250
2 October 2010	Nagoya Grampus	Away	1–2	13,027
16 October 2010	FC Tokyo	Home	3–2	17,182
23 October 2010	Cerezo Osaka	Away	0–0	9,441
30 October 2010	Kyoto Sanga	Home	1–0	12,663
6 November 2010	Vissel Kobe	Away	0–2	12,052
14 November 2010	Júbilo Iwata	Home	3–0	13,675
20 November 2010	Shimizu S-Pulse	Home	1–3	17,050
23 November 2010	Albirex Niigata	Away	1–1	24,928
27 November 2010	Sanfrecce Hiroshima	Away	0–1	16,448
4 December 2010	Kawasaki Frontale	Home	1–1	18,989

== Player statistics ==
No.	Pos.	Player	D.o.B. (Age)	Height / Weight	J. League 1		Emperor's Cup		J. League Cup		Total	
No.	Pos.	Player	D.o.B. (Age)	Height / Weight	Apps	Goals	Apps	Goals	Apps	Goals	Apps	Goals
1	GK	Tatsuro Hagihara	August 6, 1982 (aged 27)	cm / kg	0	0						
2	DF	Jiro Kamata	July 28, 1985 (aged 24)	cm / kg	27	2						
3	DF	Kodai Watanabe	December 4, 1986 (aged 23)	cm / kg	22	1						
4	DF	Junya Hosokawa	June 24, 1984 (aged 25)	cm / kg	0	0						
5	DF	Yugo Ichiyanagi	April 2, 1985 (aged 24)	cm / kg	8	0						
6	DF	Elizeu	October 21, 1979 (aged 30)	cm / kg	19	3						
7	MF	Naoki Chiba	July 24, 1977 (aged 32)	cm / kg	25	0						
8	MF	Atsushi Nagai	December 23, 1974 (aged 35)	cm / kg	10	0						
9	FW	Takayuki Nakahara	November 18, 1984 (aged 25)	cm / kg	27	4						
10	MF	Ryang Yong-Gi	January 7, 1982 (aged 28)	cm / kg	34	11						
11	MF	Kunimitsu Sekiguchi	December 26, 1985 (aged 24)	cm / kg	26	2						
13	FW	Yuki Nakashima	June 16, 1984 (aged 25)	cm / kg	21	1						
14	FW	Tomoyuki Hirase	May 23, 1977 (aged 32)	cm / kg	11	0						
15	MF	Yoshiaki Ota	June 11, 1983 (aged 26)	cm / kg	21	0						
16	GK	Takuto Hayashi	August 9, 1982 (aged 27)	cm / kg	34	0						
17	MF	Shingo Tomita	June 20, 1986 (aged 23)	cm / kg	26	0						
18	MF	Yoshiki Takahashi	May 14, 1985 (aged 24)	cm / kg	13	0						
19	FW	Reinaldo Alagoano	April 13, 1986 (aged 23)	cm / kg	3	0						
19	FW	Park Sung-Ho	July 27, 1982 (aged 27)	cm / kg	9	1						
20	MF	Fernandinho	January 13, 1981 (aged 29)	cm / kg	26	8						
22	GK	Shigeru Sakurai	June 29, 1979 (aged 30)	cm / kg	0	0						
23	MF	Naoya Tamura	November 20, 1984 (aged 25)	cm / kg	27	0						
24	FW	Shingo Akamine	December 8, 1983 (aged 26)	cm / kg	15	4						
25	MF	Naoki Sugai	September 21, 1984 (aged 25)	cm / kg	26	2						
27	DF	Park Joo-Sung	February 20, 1984 (aged 26)	cm / kg	29	0						
28	MF	Junichi Misawa	May 21, 1985 (aged 24)	cm / kg	1	0						
29	DF	Toshio Shimakawa	May 28, 1990 (aged 19)	cm / kg	0	0						
31	MF	Daisuke Saito	August 29, 1980 (aged 29)	cm / kg	16	0						
35	FW	Hiroaki Okuno	August 14, 1989 (aged 20)	cm / kg	0	0						

== Other pages ==
- (in Japanese) J. League official site
