= Takuto Hayashi =

Japanese footballer (born 1982)

Takuto Hayashi 林 卓人
Personal information
- Full name: Takuto Hayashi
- Date of birth: 9 August 1982 (age 44)
- Place of birth: Ibaraki, Osaka, Japan
- Height: 1.88 m (6 ft 2 in)
- Position: Goalkeeper

Youth career
- 1998–2000: Konko Osaka High School

Senior career*
Years	Team	Apps	(Gls)
2001–2004	Sanfrecce Hiroshima	2	(0)
2005–2007	Consadole Sapporo	71	(0)
2007–2013	Vegalta Sendai	247	(0)
2014–2023	Sanfrecce Hiroshima	192	(0)
Medal record
Vegalta Sendai
Runner-up	J1 League	2012
Sanfrecce Hiroshima
Winner	J1 League	2015
Runner-up	J1 League	2018
Runner-up	J.League Cup	2014
- * Club domestic league appearances and goals as of 14:44, 29 August 2024 (UTC)

Takuto Hayashi (林 卓人, Hayashi Takuto; born 9 August 1982) is a Japanese former professional footballer who played as a goalkeeper for Sanfrecce Hiroshima, Consadole Sapporo and Vegalta Sendai.

== Playing career ==
Hayashi was born in Ibaraki on 9 August 1982. After graduating from high school, he joined J1 League club Sanfrecce Hiroshima in 2001. However he could hardly play in the match behind Takashi Shimoda. In 2005, he moved to J2 League club Consadole Sapporo. He became a regular goalkeeper in May 2005. Although he played as regular goalkeeper in 2006 season too, he lost his position in October. In 2007, he could not play at all in the match behind Takahiro Takagi. In June 2007, he moved to J2 club Vegalta Sendai and became a regular goalkeeper soon. In 2009, he played all 51 matches and Vegalta won the champions. From 2010, he played all 34 matches in J1 every season until 2013 season. Vegalta also finished at the 4th place in 2011 season and the 2nd place in 2012 season which is highest place in the club history. In 2014, he moved to Sanfrecce Hiroshima for the first time in 10 years. He played as regular goalkeeper and Sanfrecce won the champions in 2015 J1 League.

After 10 seasons with Sanfrecce, Hayashi announced his retirement at the end of the 2023 season.

== Club statistics ==
Appearances and goals by club, season and competition
Club performance			League		Cup		League Cup		Continental		Other		Total	
Season	Club	League	Apps	Goals	Apps	Goals	Apps	Goals	Apps	Goals	Apps	Goals	Apps	Goals
Japan			League		Emperor's Cup		J.League Cup		Asia		Other^{1}		Total	
2001	Sanfrecce Hiroshima	J1 League	0	0	0	0	0	0	-		-		0	0
2002	Sanfrecce Hiroshima	J1 League	1	0	4	0	0	0	-		-		5	0
2003	Sanfrecce Hiroshima	J2 League	1	0	0	0	-		-		-		1	0
2004	Sanfrecce Hiroshima	J1 League	0	0	0	0	1	0	-		-		1	0
Total			2	0	4	0	1	0	-		-		7	0
2005	Consadole Sapporo	J2 League	33	0	1	0	-		-		-		34	0
2006	Consadole Sapporo	J2 League	38	0	1	0	-		-		-		39	0
2007	Consadole Sapporo	J2 League	0	0	0	0	-		-		-		0	0
Total			71	0	2	0	-		-		-		73	0
2007	Vegalta Sendai	J2 League	19	0	0	0	-		-		-		19	0
2008	Vegalta Sendai	J2 League	41	0	1	0	-		-		-		42	0
2009	Vegalta Sendai	J2 League	51	0	4	0	-		-		-		55	0
2010	Vegalta Sendai	J1 League	34	0	0	0	6	0	-		-		40	0
2011	Vegalta Sendai	J1 League	34	0	2	0	4	0	-		-		40	0
2012	Vegalta Sendai	J1 League	34	0	1	0	7	0	-		-		42	0
2013	Vegalta Sendai	J1 League	34	0	3	0	1	0	6	0	-		44	0
Total			247	0	11	0	18	0	6	0	-		282	0
2014	Sanfrecce Hiroshima	J1 League	31	0	2	0	5	0	8	0	1	0	47	0
2015	Sanfrecce Hiroshima	J1 League	34	0	3	0	2	0	-		6	0	45	0
2016	Sanfrecce Hiroshima	J1 League	34	0	2	0	2	0	5	0	1	0	44	0
2017	Sanfrecce Hiroshima	J1 League	19	0	1	0	0	0	-		-		20	0
2018	Sanfrecce Hiroshima	J1 League	34	0	3	0	1	0	-		-		38	0
2019	Sanfrecce Hiroshima	J1 League	4	0	1	0	2	0	2	0	-		9	0
2020	Sanfrecce Hiroshima	J1 League	19	0	-		1	0	-		-		20	0
2021	Sanfrecce Hiroshima	J1 League	11	0	0	0	6	0	-		-		17	0
2022	Sanfrecce Hiroshima	J1 League	5	0	0	0	2	0	-		-		7	0
2023	Sanfrecce Hiroshima	J1 League	1	0	0	0	0	0	-		-		1	0
Total			192	0	12	0	21	0	15	0	8	0	248	0
Career total			512	0	29	0	40	0	21	0	8	0	610	0

^{1}Includes Japanese Super Cup, J.League Championship and FIFA Club World Cup.

== Honours ==
=== Sanfrecce Hiroshima ===
- J1 League 2nd stage (1): 2015
- J.League Championship (1): 2015
- Japanese Super Cup (2) : 2014, 2016

=== Japan ===
- EAFF East Asian Cup (1) : 2013
