= Daisuke Saito (footballer, born 1980) =

Japanese footballer

Daisuke Saito 斉藤 大介
Personal information
- Full name: Daisuke Saito
- Date of birth: August 29, 1980 (age 46)
- Place of birth: Takatsuki, Osaka, Japan
- Height: 1.80 m (5 ft 11 in)
- Position: Midfielder

Youth career
- 1996–1998: Konko Daiichi High School

Senior career*
| Years | Team | Apps | (Gls) |
| 1999–2008 | Kyoto Sanga FC | 202 | (7) |
| 2008–2011 | Vegalta Sendai | 71 | (1) |
| 2011–2015 | Tokushima Vortis | 120 | (0) |
| 2016 | Tochigi SC | 5 | (0) |
| 2017 | Kochi United SC | 14 | (2) |
| 2018 | Ococias Kyoto AC | 12 | (0) |
| Total | | 424 | (10) |
Medal record
Kyoto Sanga FC
| Winner | Emperor's Cup | 2002 |
- * Club domestic league appearances and goals

Daisuke Saito (斉藤 大介, Saitō Daisuke; born August 29, 1980) is a former Japanese football player.

== Playing career ==
Saito was born in Takatsuki on August 29, 1980. After graduating from high school, he joined J1 League club Kyoto Purple Sanga (later Kyoto Sanga FC) in 1999. Although he could not play many matches until early 2002, he became a regular player as defensive midfielder from July 2002 and the club won the champions 2002 Emperor's Cup first major title in the club history. From 2003, although the club results were bad, he played many matches as regular player for a long time. However the club gain many players in 2008 and he could hardly play in the match. In July 2008, he moved to J2 League club Vegalta Sendai and became a regular player as defensive midfielder. However he lost regular position in summer 2009. Although the club was promoted to J1 from 2010 and he became a regular player from summer 2010, he could hardly play in the match in 2011. In July 2011, he moved to J2 club Tokushima Vortis and became a regular player as defensive midfielder. From summer 2012, he played as center because many defenders got hurt. However he also got hurt in August and could not play at all in the match after that. He came back as center back in 2013 and returned to defensive midfielder from summer and the club was promoted to J1 from 2014 first time in the club history. However the club was relegated to J2 in a year and his opportunity to play decreased. In 2016, he moved to J3 League club Tochigi SC. However he could hardly play in the match. In 2017, he moved to Regional Leagues club Kochi United SC and played in all matches in 2017 season. In 2018, he moved to Regional Leagues club Ococias Kyoto AC. He retired end of 2018 season.

== Career statistics ==
Appearances and goals by club, season and competition
| Club | Season | League | | | Emperor's Cup | | J.League Cup | | Total | |
| Club | Season | Division | Apps | Goals | Apps | Goals | Apps | Goals | Apps | Goals |
Japan
| Kyoto Purple Sanga | 1999 | J1 League | 0 | 0 | 0 | 0 | 0 | 0 | 0 | 0 |
| Kyoto Purple Sanga | 2000 | J1 League | 7 | 0 | 0 | 0 | 2 | 0 | 9 | 0 |
| Kyoto Purple Sanga | 2001 | J2 League | 0 | 0 | 0 | 0 | 0 | 0 | 0 | 0 |
| Kyoto Purple Sanga | 2002 | J1 League | 22 | 1 | 4 | 0 | 5 | 0 | 31 | 1 |
| Kyoto Purple Sanga | 2003 | J1 League | 27 | 1 | 1 | 0 | 4 | 0 | 32 | 1 |
| Kyoto Purple Sanga | 2004 | J2 League | 21 | 0 | 2 | 0 | — | | 23 | 0 |
| Kyoto Purple Sanga | 2005 | J2 League | 42 | 2 | 1 | 0 | — | | 43 | 2 |
| Kyoto Purple Sanga | 2006 | J1 League | 33 | 1 | 1 | 0 | 5 | 0 | 39 | 1 |
| Kyoto Sanga FC | 2007 | J2 League | 48 | 2 | 0 | 0 | — | | 48 | 2 |
| Kyoto Sanga FC | 2008 | J1 League | 2 | 0 | 0 | 0 | 1 | 0 | 3 | 0 |
| Vegalta Sendai | 2008 | J2 League | 16 | 1 | 1 | 0 | — | | 17 | 1 |
| Vegalta Sendai | 2009 | J2 League | 36 | 0 | 1 | 0 | — | | 37 | 0 |
| Vegalta Sendai | 2010 | J1 League | 16 | 0 | 0 | 0 | 4 | 0 | 20 | 0 |
| Vegalta Sendai | 2011 | J1 League | 3 | 0 | 0 | 0 | 0 | 0 | 3 | 0 |
| Tokushima Vortis | 2011 | J2 League | 23 | 0 | 1 | 0 | — | | 24 | 0 |
| Tokushima Vortis | 2012 | J2 League | 22 | 0 | 0 | 0 | — | | 22 | 0 |
| Tokushima Vortis | 2013 | J2 League | 31 | 0 | 0 | 0 | — | | 31 | 0 |
| Tokushima Vortis | 2014 | J1 League | 22 | 0 | 1 | 0 | 5 | 0 | 28 | 0 |
| Tokushima Vortis | 2015 | J2 League | 22 | 0 | 3 | 0 | — | | 25 | 0 |
| Tochigi SC | 2016 | J3 League | 5 | 0 | — | | — | | 5 | 0 |
| Kochi United SC | 2017 | Regional Leagues | 14 | 2 | 1 | 0 | — | | 15 | 2 |
| Ococias Kyoto AC | 2018 | Regional Leagues | 12 | 0 | 1 | 0 | — | | 13 | 0 |
| Career total | | | 424 | 10 | 18 | 0 | 26 | 0 | 468 | 10 |
