= Takayuki Nakahara =

Japanese footballer (born 1984)

Takayuki Nakahara 中原 貴之
Personal information
- Full name: Takayuki Nakahara
- Date of birth: 18 November 1984 (age 41)
- Place of birth: Yamaguchi, Yamaguchi, Japan
- Height: 1.82 m (5 ft 11 1/2 in)
- Position: Forward

Youth career
- 2000–2002: Tatara Gakuen High School

Senior career*
Years	Team	Apps	(Gls)
2003–2014	Vegalta Sendai	184	(25)
2006	→ Albirex Niigata (loan)	15	(2)
2015–2017	Avispa Fukuoka	37	(8)
2018	ReinMeer Aomori	8	(0)
Total		244	(35)
Medal record
Vegalta Sendai
Runner-up	J1 League	2012
- * Club domestic league appearances and goals

Takayuki Nakahara (中原 貴之, Nakahara Takayuki; born 18 November 1984) is a former Japanese football player.

== Playing career ==
Nakahara was born in Yamaguchi on 18 November 1984. After graduating from high school, he joined J1 League club Vegalta Sendai in 2003. He played several matches as forward, Vegalta was relegated to J2 League end of 2003 season. Although he played many matches in 2004, he could hardly play in the match in 2005. In 2006, he was loaned to J1 club Albirex Niigata. In 2007, he returned to Vegalta. He played many matches as substitute forward every season and Vegalta won the champions in 2009 season.

Although he played many matches in J1 in 2010, his opportunity to play decreased from 2011. In 2015, he moved to J2 club Avispa Fukuoka. He played as regular forward and was promoted to J1 end of 2015 season. However he could hardly play in the match and Avispa was relegated to J2 in a year. In 2018, he moved to Japan Football League club ReinMeer Aomori. He retired end of 2018 season.

== Club statistics ==
Updated to 8 January 2019.

Club performance			League		Cup		League Cup		Continental		Total	
Season	Club	League	Apps	Goals	Apps	Goals	Apps	Goals	Apps	Goals	Apps	Goals
Japan			League		Emperor's Cup		J.League Cup		AFC		Total	
2003	Vegalta Sendai	J1 League	4	0	0	0	4	0	-		8	0
2004	Vegalta Sendai	J2 League	18	2	0	0	-		-		18	2
2005	Vegalta Sendai	J2 League	2	0	1	0	-		-		3	0
2006	Albirex Niigata	J1 League	15	2	0	0	5	1	-		20	3
2007	Vegalta Sendai	J2 League	20	1	1	0	-		-		21	1
2008	Vegalta Sendai	J2 League	38	6	2	1	-		-		40	7
2009	Vegalta Sendai	J2 League	36	10	5	2	-		-		41	12
2010	Vegalta Sendai	J1 League	27	4	1	0	7	0	-		35	4
2011	Vegalta Sendai	J1 League	9	0	1	0	3	0	-		13	0
2012	Vegalta Sendai	J1 League	16	2	2	0	5	2	-		23	4
2013	Vegalta Sendai	J1 League	11	0	3	0	1	0	5	1	20	1
2014	Vegalta Sendai	J1 League	3	0	0	0	1	0	-		4	0
2015	Avispa Fukuoka	J2 League	34	8	3	0	–		–		37	8
2016	Avispa Fukuoka	J1 League	3	0	0	0	2	0	–		5	0
2017	Avispa Fukuoka	J2 League	0	0	1	1	–		–		1	1
2018	ReinMeer Aomori	JFL	8	0	0	0	–		–		8	0
Career total			244	35	20	4	28	3	5	1	297	43
