= Naoki Sugai =

Japanese footballer

Naoki Sugai 菅井 直樹
Personal information
- Full name: Naoki Sugai
- Date of birth: 21 September 1984 (age 42)
- Place of birth: Yamagata, Yamagata, Japan
- Height: 1.78 m (5 ft 10 in)
- Position: Midfielder

Youth career
- 2000–2002: Yamagata Chuo High School

Senior career*
| Years | Team | Apps | (Gls) |
| 2003–2018 | Vegalta Sendai | 389 | (40) |
| Total | | 389 | (40) |
Medal record
Vegalta Sendai
| Runner-up | J1 League | 2012 |
| Runner-up | Emperor's Cup | 2018 |
- * Club domestic league appearances and goals

Naoki Sugai (菅井 直樹, Sugai Naoki; born 21 September 1984) is a former Japanese football player.

== Playing career ==
Sugai was born in Yamagata on 21 September 1984. After graduating from high school, he joined J1 League club Vegalta Sendai in 2003. He could not play at all in the match and Vegalta was relegated J2 League end of 2003 season. He played many matches as defensive midfielder from 2004. In 2006, he was converted to right side back under new manager Joel Santana and played many matches as regular player for a long time. Vegalta won the champions in 2009 season and was promoted to J1.

Although 2011 Tōhoku earthquake and tsunami occurred in Sendai immediately after the opening 2011 season, Vegalta finished at the 4th place which is best results in the club history. In 2012 season, Vegalta won the 2nd place and qualified for 2013 AFC Champions League. His opportunity to play decreased behind Kazuki Oiwa from 2016. He retired end of 2018 season.

== Club statistics ==
| Club performance | | | League | | Cup | | League Cup | | Continental | | Total | |
| Season | Club | League | Apps | Goals | Apps | Goals | Apps | Goals | Apps | Goals | Apps | Goals |
| Japan | | | League | | Emperor's Cup | | J.League Cup | | AFC | | Total | |
|---|---|---|---|---|---|---|---|---|---|---|---|---|
| 2003 | Vegalta Sendai | J1 League | 0 | 0 | 0 | 0 | 0 | 0 | - | | 0 | 0 |
| 2004 | Vegalta Sendai | J2 League | 19 | 0 | 2 | 0 | - | | - | | 21 | 0 |
| 2005 | Vegalta Sendai | J2 League | 13 | 0 | 0 | 0 | - | | - | | 13 | 0 |
| 2006 | Vegalta Sendai | J2 League | 37 | 7 | 0 | 0 | - | | - | | 37 | 7 |
| 2007 | Vegalta Sendai | J2 League | 40 | 6 | 1 | 0 | - | | - | | 41 | 6 |
| 2008 | Vegalta Sendai | J2 League | 28 | 4 | 0 | 0 | - | | - | | 28 | 4 |
| 2009 | Vegalta Sendai | J2 League | 49 | 3 | 5 | 0 | - | | - | | 54 | 3 |
| 2010 | Vegalta Sendai | J1 League | 26 | 2 | 0 | 0 | 6 | 0 | - | | 32 | 2 |
| 2011 | Vegalta Sendai | J1 League | 30 | 7 | 2 | 0 | 3 | 0 | - | | 35 | 7 |
| 2012 | Vegalta Sendai | J1 League | 30 | 5 | 1 | 0 | 6 | 0 | - | | 37 | 5 |
| 2013 | Vegalta Sendai | J1 League | 22 | 2 | 2 | 0 | 2 | 0 | 2 | 1 | 28 | 1 |
| 2014 | Vegalta Sendai | J1 League | 30 | 3 | 1 | 0 | 2 | 0 | – | | 33 | 3 |
| 2015 | Vegalta Sendai | J1 League | 28 | 0 | 2 | 2 | 1 | 0 | – | | 31 | 2 |
| 2016 | Vegalta Sendai | J1 League | 16 | 0 | 0 | 0 | 3 | 0 | – | | 19 | 0 |
| 2017 | Vegalta Sendai | J1 League | 14 | 1 | 0 | 0 | 3 | 0 | – | | 17 | 1 |
| 2018 | Vegalta Sendai | J1 League | 7 | 0 | 2 | 0 | 5 | 0 | – | | 14 | 0 |
| Career total | | | 389 | 40 | 18 | 2 | 31 | 0 | 2 | 1 | 440 | 43 |
