= 2017 Sanfrecce Hiroshima season =

Sanfrecce Hiroshima
2017 season
- Manager: Hajime Moriyasu; Akinobu Yokouchi; Jan Jönsson
- Stadium: Edion Stadium Hiroshima
- J1 League: 15th

2017 Sanfrecce Hiroshima season.

== J1 League ==
=== League table ===
Pos	Team	Pld	W	D	L	GF	GA	GD	Pts	Qualification or relegation
13	FC Tokyo	34	10	10	14	37	42	−5	40	
14	Shimizu S-Pulse	34	8	10	16	36	54	−18	34	
15	Sanfrecce Hiroshima	34	8	9	17	32	49	−17	33	
16	Ventforet Kofu (R)	34	7	11	16	23	39	−16	32	Relegation to 2018 J2 League
17	Albirex Niigata (R)	34	7	7	20	28	60	−32	28	Relegation to 2018 J2 League

Source: Meiji Yasuda J1 League
Rules for classification: 1) Points; 2) Goal difference; 3) Goals scored
(R) Relegated

=== Match details ===
J1 League match details
Match	Date	Team	Score	Team	Venue	Attendance
1	2017.02.25	Sanfrecce Hiroshima	1-1	Albirex Niigata	Edion Stadium Hiroshima	17,545
2	2017.03.04	Sanfrecce Hiroshima	0-1	Shimizu S-Pulse	Edion Stadium Hiroshima	13,489
3	2017.03.11	Sagan Tosu	1-0	Sanfrecce Hiroshima	Best Amenity Stadium	13,004
4	2017.03.18	Hokkaido Consadole Sapporo	2-1	Sanfrecce Hiroshima	Sapporo Dome	12,624
5	2017.04.01	Sanfrecce Hiroshima	0-2	Kashiwa Reysol	Edion Stadium Hiroshima	13,639
6	2017.04.07	Gamba Osaka	0-1	Sanfrecce Hiroshima	Suita City Football Stadium	13,521
7	2017.04.16	Sanfrecce Hiroshima	0-1	Yokohama F. Marinos	Edion Stadium Hiroshima	12,651
8	2017.04.22	Sanfrecce Hiroshima	3-3	Vegalta Sendai	Edion Stadium Hiroshima	10,814
9	2017.04.30	FC Tokyo	1-0	Sanfrecce Hiroshima	Ajinomoto Stadium	25,037
10	2017.05.06	Sanfrecce Hiroshima	1-1	Vissel Kobe	Edion Stadium Hiroshima	13,421
11	2017.05.14	Cerezo Osaka	5-2	Sanfrecce Hiroshima	Kincho Stadium	14,351
12	2017.05.20	Ventforet Kofu	1-2	Sanfrecce Hiroshima	Yamanashi Chuo Bank Stadium	8,653
13	2017.05.27	Sanfrecce Hiroshima	0-0	Júbilo Iwata	Edion Stadium Hiroshima	13,008
14	2017.06.04	Sanfrecce Hiroshima	1-3	Kashima Antlers	Edion Stadium Hiroshima	15,781
15	2017.06.17	Kawasaki Frontale	1-0	Sanfrecce Hiroshima	Kawasaki Todoroki Stadium	23,209
16	2017.06.25	Sanfrecce Hiroshima	0-3	Omiya Ardija	Edion Stadium Hiroshima	11,433
17	2017.07.01	Urawa Reds	4-3	Sanfrecce Hiroshima	Saitama Stadium 2002	30,853
18	2017.07.08	Yokohama F. Marinos	1-1	Sanfrecce Hiroshima	Nissan Stadium	23,517
19	2017.07.30	Sanfrecce Hiroshima	0-1	Sagan Tosu	Edion Stadium Hiroshima	14,974
20	2017.08.05	Júbilo Iwata	2-3	Sanfrecce Hiroshima	Yamaha Stadium	14,515
21	2017.08.09	Sanfrecce Hiroshima	2-2	Gamba Osaka	Edion Stadium Hiroshima	12,573
22	2017.08.13	Vegalta Sendai	1-0	Sanfrecce Hiroshima	Yurtec Stadium Sendai	14,258
23	2017.08.19	Sanfrecce Hiroshima	1-0	Ventforet Kofu	Edion Stadium Hiroshima	11,771
24	2017.08.26	Omiya Ardija	1-1	Sanfrecce Hiroshima	NACK5 Stadium Omiya	11,511
25	2017.09.09	Albirex Niigata	0-0	Sanfrecce Hiroshima	Denka Big Swan Stadium	21,456
26	2017.09.16	Sanfrecce Hiroshima	1-0	Cerezo Osaka	Edion Stadium Hiroshima	11,726
27	2017.09.23	Shimizu S-Pulse	1-3	Sanfrecce Hiroshima	IAI Stadium Nihondaira	14,441
28	2017.09.30	Sanfrecce Hiroshima	1-1	Hokkaido Consadole Sapporo	Edion Stadium Hiroshima	18,065
29	2017.10.14	Kashima Antlers	2-0	Sanfrecce Hiroshima	Kashima Soccer Stadium	18,655
30	2017.10.21	Sanfrecce Hiroshima	0-3	Kawasaki Frontale	Edion Stadium Hiroshima	8,319
31	2017.10.29	Sanfrecce Hiroshima	0-1	Urawa Reds	Edion Stadium Hiroshima	17,178
32	2017.11.18	Vissel Kobe	1-2	Sanfrecce Hiroshima	Kobe Universiade Memorial Stadium	12,805
33	2017.11.26	Sanfrecce Hiroshima	2-1	FC Tokyo	Edion Stadium Hiroshima	22,333
34	2017.12.02	Kashiwa Reysol	1-0	Sanfrecce Hiroshima	Hitachi Kashiwa Stadium	13,235
