= Hiroshi Futami =

Japanese footballer

Hiroshi Futami 二見 宏志
Personal information
- Full name: Hiroshi Futami
- Date of birth: 20 March 1992 (age 34)
- Place of birth: Osaka, Japan
- Height: 1.79 m (5 ft 10 in)
- Position: Centre back

Team information
- Current team: FC Imabari
- Number: 26

Youth career
- 2007–2009: Nara Ikuei High School

College career
Years	Team	Apps	(Gls)
2010–2013	Hannan University		

Senior career*
Years	Team	Apps	(Gls)
2013–2016	Vegalta Sendai	25	(1)
2016–2019	Shimizu S-Pulse	58	(1)
2020–2022	V-Varen Nagasaki	96	(1)
2023-	FC Imabari	14	(0)
Total		193	(3)
- * Club domestic league appearances and goals as of 12:57, 06 January 2024 (AEST)

Hiroshi Futami (二見 宏志, born 20 March 1992) is a Japanese football defender who currently plays for FC Imabari in the J3 League.

== Career statistics ==
Updated to 18 February 2019.

Appearances and goals by club, season and competition
Club	Season	League			Emperor's Cup		J.League Cup		Total	
Club	Season	Division	Apps	Goals	Apps	Goals	Apps	Goals	Apps	Goals
Vegalta Sendai	2013	J1 League	1	0	—		—		1	0
Vegalta Sendai	2014	J1 League	7	1	1	0	5	0	13	1
Vegalta Sendai	2015	J1 League	13	0	2	1	4	0	19	1
Vegalta Sendai	2016	J1 League	4	0	—		3	0	7	0
Shimizu S-Pulse	2016	J2 League	1	0	3	0	—		4	0
Shimizu S-Pulse	2017	J1 League	25	1	1	0	2	0	28	1
Shimizu S-Pulse	2018	J1 League	7	0	1	0	6	0	14	0
Career total			58	2	8	1	20	0	86	3
