= Marcelo Soares =

Brazilian footballer

Personal information
- Full name: Marcelo Gomes Soares
- Date of birth: March 9, 1982 (age 44)
- Place of birth: Maceió, Brazil
- Height: 1.81 m (5 ft 11 1/2 in)
- Position: Forward

Team information
- Current team: São Caetano

Senior career*
Years	Team	Apps	(Gls)
2007	J. Malucelli		
2008–2010	Ponte Preta		
2009	→ Vegalta Sendai (loan)	34	(16)
2010	Americana	8	(1)
2011	Comercial-SP		
2011	Anápolis		
2011	Sampaio Corrêa	2	(1)
2012	Novo Hamburgo		
2012–2013	Rio Branco		
2013	XV de Piracicaba		
2013–	São Caetano		
- * Club domestic league appearances and goals

Marcelo Gomes Soares (born March 9, 1982) is a Brazilian football player who currently plays for São Caetano.

== Club statistics ==
Club performance			League		Cup		Total	
Season	Club	League	Apps	Goals	Apps	Goals	Apps	Goals
Japan			League		Emperor's Cup		Total	
2009	Vegalta Sendai	J2 League	34	16	5	1	39	17
Country	Japan		34	16	5	1	39	17
Total			34	16	5	1	39	17
