= Takuma Hidaka =

Japanese footballer

Takuma Hidaka 日高 拓磨
Personal information
- Full name: Takuma Hidaka
- Date of birth: April 8, 1983 (age 43)
- Place of birth: Fukuyama, Hiroshima, Japan
- Height: 1.77 m (5 ft 9 1/2 in)
- Position: Defender

Youth career
- 1999–2001: Shimizu S-Pulse
- 2002–2005: Meiji University

Senior career*
Years	Team	Apps	(Gls)
2006–2010	Sagan Tosu	130	(6)
2011–2014	Consadole Sapporo	94	(5)
2015	Kataller Toyama	23	(2)
Total		247	(13)
- * Club domestic league appearances and goals

Takuma Hidaka (日高 拓磨, Hidaka Takuma; born April 8, 1983) is a former Japanese football player.

== Career statistics ==
Appearances and goals by club, season and competition
Club	Season	League			Emperor's Cup		J.League Cup		Total	
Club	Season	Division	Apps	Goals	Apps	Goals	Apps	Goals	Apps	Goals
Sagan Tosu	2006	J2 League	2	0	0	0	–		2	0
Sagan Tosu	2007	J2 League	38	1	3	0	–		41	1
Sagan Tosu	2008	J2 League	35	0	3	0	–		38	0
Sagan Tosu	2009	J2 League	32	3	3	0	–		35	3
Sagan Tosu	2010	J2 League	23	2	0	0	–		23	2
Sagan Tosu	Total		130	6	9	0	0	0	139	6
Consadole Sapporo	2011	J2 League	25	0	0	0	–		25	0
Consadole Sapporo	2012	J1 League	19	3	0	0	6	0	25	3
Consadole Sapporo	2013	J2 League	27	2	1	0	–		28	2
Consadole Sapporo	2014	J2 League	23	0	0	0	–		23	0
Consadole Sapporo	Total		94	5	1	0	6	0	101	5
Kataller Toyama	2015	J3 League	23	2	–		–		23	2
Career total			247	13	10	0	6	0	263	13
