= Yuji Senuma =

Japanese footballer

Yuji Senuma 瀬沼 優司
Personal information
- Full name: Yuji Senuma
- Date of birth: 1 September 1990 (age 36)
- Place of birth: Sagamihara, Japan
- Height: 1.85 m (6 ft 1 in)
- Position: Forward

Youth career
- 2006–2008: Toko Gakuen High School

College career
Years	Team	Apps	(Gls)
2009–2012	University of Tsukuba		

Senior career*
Years	Team	Apps	(Gls)
2012–2017	Shimizu S-Pulse	14	(1)
2014	→ Tochigi SC (loan)	25	(7)
2015–2016	→ Ehime FC (loan)	80	(16)
2017	→ Montedio Yamagata (loan)	38	(9)
2018	Montedio Yamagata	16	(0)
2018–2020	Yokohama FC	15	(1)
2021	Zweigen Kanazawa	33	(6)
2022–2024	Tochigi SC	15	(1)
2023–2024	→ SC Sagamihara (loan)	49	(5)
Medal record
Shimizu S-Pulse
Runner-up	J.League Cup	2012
- * Club domestic league appearances and goals as of 15 August 2024 @ 17:07(AEST)

Yuji Senuma (瀬沼 優司, Senuma Yūji; born 1 September 1990) is a Japanese former football player who played as a forward.

Senuma has over 230 appearances in the J2 League.

== Career ==
On 24 June 2012, Senuma joined Shimizu S-Pulse from the University of Tsukuba as a new player for the 2013 season. However, on 2 August 2012, he was approved to become a specially-designated player for the 2012 season, meaning he could make appearances during the 2012 season.

On 8 January 2014, Senuma was announced at Tochigi SC on a one year loan deal. On 13 August 2014, his loan was cut short and he returned to Shimizu S-Pulse after scoring 7 goals in 25 matches.

On 8 January 2015, Senuma was announced at Ehime FC on a one year loan deal.

Senuma participated in a training camp during his loan to Montedio Yamagata, due to the heavy snowfall in Yamagata. On 18 July 2017, Senuma suffered a strained right soleus muscle injury, and would be out for a few weeks. He was the team's top goalscorer at this point, with 6 goals in 21 games.

On 20 December 2017, Senuma was announced at Montedio Yamagata on a permanent transfer. During the 2018 season, he was appointed as vice-captain, along with Jairo Rodrigues and Takuya Honda.

On 27 July 2018, Senuma was announced at Yokohama FC on a permanent transfer.

On 2 January 2021, Senuma was announced at Zweigen Kanazawa on a permanent transfer.

On 1 January 2022, Senuma was announced at Tochigi SC on a permanent transfer.

On 17 July 2023, Senuma was announced at SC Sagamihara on a six month loan deal.

On 1 May 2025, Senuma announced his retirement from football.

== Club statistics ==
Updated to 1 March 2019.

Club performance			League		Cup		League Cup		Other		Total	
Season	Club	League	Apps	Goals	Apps	Goals	Apps	Goals	Apps	Goals	Apps	Goals
Japan			League		Emperor's Cup		J. League Cup		Other^{1}		Total	
2012	Shimizu S-Pulse	J1 League	3	1	-		2	1	-		5	2
2013	Shimizu S-Pulse	J1 League	9	0	0	0	6	0	-		15	0
2014	Tochigi SC	J2 League	25	7	1	0	-		-		26	7
2014	Shimizu S-Pulse	J1 League	2	0	-		-		-		2	0
2015	Ehime FC	J2 League	40	6	2	1	-		1	0	43	7
2016	Ehime FC	J2 League	40	10	2	0	–		–		42	10
2017	Montedio Yamagata	J2 League	38	9	1	1	–		–		39	10
2018	Montedio Yamagata	J2 League	16	0	2	0	–		–		18	0
2018	Yokohama FC	J2 League	15	1	0	0	–		–		15	1
Total			188	34	8	2	8	1	1	0	205	37

^{1}Includes Promotion Playoffs to J1.
