= Akihiro Sato (footballer, born October 1986) =

Japanese footballer (born 1986)

Akihiro Sato 佐藤 晃大
Personal information
- Full name: Akihiro Sato
- Date of birth: 22 October 1986 (age 40)
- Place of birth: Zama, Kanagawa, Japan
- Height: 1.84 m (6 ft 0 in)
- Position: Forward

Team information
- Current team: Tokushima Vortis
- Number: 18

Youth career
- 2005–2008: Tokai University

Senior career*
Years	Team	Apps	(Gls)
2009–11	Tokushima Vortis	79	(18)
2012–14	Gamba Osaka	54	(14)
2015–	Tokushima Vortis	89	(8)
Medal record
Gamba Osaka
Winner	J1 League	2014
Winner	J.League Cup	2014
Winner	Emperor's Cup	2014
Runner-up	Emperor's Cup	2012
- * Club domestic league appearances and goals as of 30 December 2018

Akihiro Sato (佐藤 晃大, born 22 October 1986) is a Japanese football player for Tokushima Vortis.

== Career statistics ==
=== Club ===
Updated to end of 2018 season.

Club	Season	League		Cup		League Cup		AFC		Total	
Club	Season	Apps	Goals	Apps	Goals	Apps	Goals	Apps	Goals	Apps	Goals
Tokushima Vortis	2009	17	4	0	0	-		-		17	4
Tokushima Vortis	2010	26	5	1	1	-		-		27	6
Tokushima Vortis	2011	36	9	1	0	-		-		37	9
Gamba Osaka	2012	26	11	1	0	2	1	5	0	34	12
Gamba Osaka	2013	5	1	0	0	–		–		5	1
Gamba Osaka	2014	23	2	5	3	8	1	–		36	6
Tokushima Vortis	2015	26	4	1	0	–		–		27	4
Tokushima Vortis	2016	33	4	1	0	–		–		34	4
Tokushima Vortis	2017	10	0	0	0	–		–		10	0
Tokushima Vortis	2018	20	0	0	0	–		–		20	0
Career total		222	40	10	4	10	2	5	0	247	46
