= Kentaro Seki =

Japanese footballer (born 1986)

Kentaro Seki 関 憲太郎
Personal information
- Full name: Kentaro Seki
- Date of birth: 9 March 1986 (age 40)
- Place of birth: Fujioka, Gunma, Japan
- Height: 1.78 m (5 ft 10 in)
- Position: Goalkeeper

Youth career
- 1994–1996: Kanna Elementary School
- 1997–2000: Fujioka Kita Junior High School
- 2001: Maebashi Ikuei High School
- 2002–2003: Kunimi High School

College career
Years	Team	Apps	(Gls)
2004–2007	Meiji University		

Senior career*
Years	Team	Apps	(Gls)
2008–2021	Vegalta Sendai	85	(0)
2010–2012	→ Yokohama FC (loan)	59	(0)
2021–2025	Renofa Yamaguchi	130	(0)
Medal record
Vegalta Sendai
Runner-up	Emperor's Cup	2018
- * Club domestic league appearances and goals as of 19 March 2025

Kentaro Seki (関 憲太郎, Seki Kentarō; born 9 March 1986) is a Japanese football player for Renofa Yamaguchi.

== Career statistics ==
Updated to 18 February 2019.

Appearances and goals by club, season and competition
Club	Season	League			Emperor's Cup		J.League Cup		Total	
Club	Season	Division	Apps	Goals	Apps	Goals	Apps	Goals	Apps	Goals
Vegalta Sendai	2008	J2 League	0	0	0	0	—		0	0
Vegalta Sendai	2009	J2 League	0	0	0	0	—		0	0
Yokohama FC	2010	J2 League	13	0	1	0	—		14	0
Yokohama FC	2011	J2 League	38	0	1	0	—		39	0
Yokohama FC	2012	J2 League	8	0	1	0	—		9	0
Vegalta Sendai	2013	J1 League	0	0	1	0	0	0	1	0
Vegalta Sendai	2014	J1 League	33	0	1	0	1	0	35	0
Vegalta Sendai	2015	J1 League	2	0	3	0	4	0	9	0
Vegalta Sendai	2016	J1 League	20	0	1	0	4	0	25	0
Vegalta Sendai	2017	J1 League	14	0	1	0	6	0	21	0
Vegalta Sendai	2018	J1 League	16	0	2	0	2	0	20	0
Career total			144	0	12	0	17	0	173	0
