= Park Ju-sung =

South Korean footballer (born 1984)

Park Ju-Sung 박주성
Personal information
- Full name: Park Ju-Sung
- Date of birth: 20 February 1984 (age 42)
- Place of birth: Jinhae, Gyeongsangnam-do, South Korea
- Height: 1.83 m (6 ft 0 in)
- Position: Defender

Youth career
- 2002: Kwangwoon University

Senior career*
Years	Team	Apps	(Gls)
2003–2008	Suwon Bluewings	22	(0)
2005–2006	→ Gwangju Sangmu (army)	18	(0)
2009–2012	Vegalta Sendai	90	(2)
2013–2014	Gyeongnam FC	52	(1)
2015	Guizhou Renhe	26	(0)
2016–2017	Gyeongnam FC	8	(0)
2017–2018	Daejeon Citizen	8	(0)
Total		247	(3)

International career^{‡}
2002–2003	South Korea U-20	18	(0)
2003	South Korea U-23	1	(0)
2003–2006	South Korea	2	(0)
- * Club domestic league appearances and goals as of 1 January 2018 ‡ National team caps and goals as of 9 January 2009

- Park Ju-sung
- Hangul: 박주성
- Hanja: 朴住成
- RR: Bak Juseong
- MR: Pak Chusŏng

Park Ju-Sung (born 20 February 1984 in Jinhae, Gyeongsangnam-do) is a South Korean former football player.

== Club statistics ==
As of 3 September 2017

Appearances and goals by club, season and competition
Club	Season	League			Cup		League Cup		Other		Total	
Club	Season	Division	Apps	Goals	Apps	Goals	Apps	Goals	Apps	Goals	Apps	Goals
Suwon Samsung Bluewings	2003	K-League	11	0	0	0	—		—		11	0
Suwon Samsung Bluewings	2004	K-League	6	0	0	0	1	0	—		7	0
Suwon Samsung Bluewings	2006	K-League	1	0	0	0	0	0	—		1	0
Suwon Samsung Bluewings	2007	K-League	3	0	0	0	3	0	—		6	0
Suwon Samsung Bluewings	2008	K-League	1	0	0	0	0	0	—		1	0
Suwon Samsung Bluewings	Total		22	0	0	0	4	0	—		26	0
Gwangju Sangmu (army)	2005	K-League	3	0	1	1	0	0	—		4	1
Gwangju Sangmu (army)	2006	K-League	15	0	1	0	10	0	—		26	0
Gwangju Sangmu (army)	Total		18	0	2	1	10	0	—		30	1
Vegalta Sendai	2009	J2 League	34	2	3	0	—		—		37	2
Vegalta Sendai	2010	J1 League	29	0	1	0	8	1	—		38	1
Vegalta Sendai	2011	J1 League	27	0	1	0	3	0	—		31	0
Vegalta Sendai	2012	J1 League	23	0	0	0	2	0	—		25	0
Vegalta Sendai	Total		113	2	5	0	13	1	—		131	3
Gyeongnam FC	2013	K League Classic	17	0	2	0	—		—		19	0
Gyeongnam FC	2014	K League Classic	35	1	0	0	—		1	0	36	1
Gyeongnam FC	Total		52	1	2	0	—		1	0	55	1
Guizhou Renhe	2015	Chinese Super League	26	0	0	0	—		—		26	0
Gyeongnam FC	2016	K League Challenge	8	0	1	0	—		—		9	0
Gyeongnam FC	2017	K League Challenge	0	0	1	0	—		—		1	0
Gyeongnam FC	Total		8	0	2	0	—		—		10	0
Daejeon Citizen	2017	K League Challenge	8	0	—		—		—		9	0
Daejeon Citizen	2018	K League 2	0	0	—		—		—		0	0
Daejeon Citizen	Total		8	0	—		—		—		8	0
Career total			247	3	12	1	27	1	1	0	287	5
