= Kunimitsu Sekiguchi =

Japanese footballer

Kunimitsu Sekiguchi 関口 訓充
Personal information
- Full name: Kunimitsu Sekiguchi
- Date of birth: 26 December 1985 (age 40)
- Place of birth: Tama, Tokyo, Japan
- Height: 1.71 m (5 ft 7 1/2 in)
- Position: Midfielder

Team information
- Current team: Nankatsu SC

Youth career
- 2001–2003: Teikyo High School

Senior career*
Years	Team	Apps	(Gls)
2004–2012	Vegalta Sendai	274	(22)
2013–2014	Urawa Reds	27	(1)
2015–2017	Cerezo Osaka	75	(3)
2018–2021	Vegalta Sendai	96	(6)
2022–	Nankatsu SC	0	(0)

International career
2010–2011	Japan	3	(0)
Medal record
Vegalta Sendai
Runner-up	J1 League	2012
Runner-up	Emperor's Cup	2018
Urawa Reds
Runner-up	J1 League	2014
Runner-up	J.League Cup	2013
Cerezo Osaka
Winner	J.League Cup	2017
Winner	Emperor's Cup	2017
- * Club domestic league appearances and goals as of 16 January 2022

Kunimitsu Sekiguchi (関口 訓充, Sekiguchi Kunimitsu; born 26 December 1985) is a Japanese football player who plays for Nankatsu SC.

== Club career ==
After the 2017 season, Sekiguchi seemed to have opted for retirement. With a surprise announcement, though, he joined back Vegalta Sendai in April 2018.

== National team career ==
Sekiguchi made a full international debut for Japan on 8 October 2010 in a friendly against Argentina.

== Club statistics ==
As of end of 2021 season

Club performance			League		Cup		League Cup		Asia		Other		Total	
Season	Club	League	Apps	Goals	Apps	Goals	Apps	Goals	Apps	Goals	Apps	Goals	Apps	Goals
Japan			League		Emperor's Cup		J.League Cup		AFC		Other^{1}		Total	
2004	Vegalta Sendai	J2 League	10	1	2	0	–		–		–		12	1
2005	Vegalta Sendai	J2 League	24	2	2	0	–		–		–		26	2
2006	Vegalta Sendai	J2 League	21	2	0	0	–		–		–		21	2
2007	Vegalta Sendai	J2 League	44	2	1	0	–		–		–		45	2
2008	Vegalta Sendai	J2 League	41	6	2	0	–		–		2	0	45	6
2009	Vegalta Sendai	J2 League	50	4	5	1	–		–		–		55	5
2010	Vegalta Sendai	J1 League	26	2	1	0	6	1	–		–		33	3
2011	Vegalta Sendai	J1 League	30	0	3	0	2	0	–		–		35	0
2012	Vegalta Sendai	J1 League	28	3	2	0	3	0	–		–		33	3
2013	Urawa Reds	J1 League	20	1	2	0	4	0	6	1	–		32	2
2014	Urawa Reds	J1 League	7	0	1	0	6	1	–		–		14	1
2015	Cerezo Osaka	J2 League	31	1	0	0	–		–		2	0	33	1
2016	Cerezo Osaka	J2 League	26	2	3	0	–		–		0	0	29	2
2017	Cerezo Osaka	J1 League	18	0	4	0	8	0	–		0	0	30	0
2018	Vegalta Sendai	J1 League	16	1	3	0	3	0	–		–		22	1
2019	Vegalta Sendai	J1 League	22	4	0	0	6	0	–		–		28	4
2020	Vegalta Sendai	J1 League	30	0	–		1	0	–		–		31	0
2021	Vegalta Sendai	J1 League	28	1	0	0	0	0	–		–		28	1
2022	Nankatsu SC	Kanto Soccer League (Div. 1)			–		–		–		–			
Career total			472	32	31	1	39	2	6	1	4	0	552	36

^{1}Includes Relegation/Promotion Play-offs.

== National team statistics ==
Japan national team
Year	Apps	Goals
2010	1	0
2011	2	0
Total	3	0

== Honours ==
=== Japan ===
- Kirin Cup (1) : 2011

=== Club ===
Vegalta Sendai

- J2 League (1) : 2009

Cerezo Osaka

- J.League Cup (1) : 2017
- Emperor's Cup (1) : 2017
