= Wilson (footballer, born 1985) =

Brazilian footballer

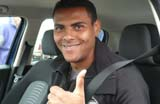
- Wilson Fonseca in 2008.

Personal information
- Full name: Wilson Rodrigues Fonseca
- Date of birth: 21 March 1985 (age 41)
- Place of birth: Araras, Brazil
- Height: 1.79 m (5 ft 10 in)
- Position: Forward

Youth career
- 2002: Corinthians

Senior career*
Years	Team	Apps	(Gls)
2003–2007	Corinthians	41	(5)
2005–2006	→ Paulista (loan)		
2008	Genoa	3	(0)
2008–2010	Sport Recife	54	(19)
2011	Shaanxi Chanba	24	(3)
2012–2016	Vegalta Sendai	128	(40)
2017	Ventforet Kofu	21	(2)
2018	Linense	0	(0)
2018	Fortaleza	20	(1)
2019	Mirassol	0	(0)
2019	São Bento	1	(0)
- * Club domestic league appearances and goals as of 23:44, 9 March 2020 (UTC)

Wilson Rodrigues Fonseca (born 21 March 1985), or simply Wilson, is a Brazilian striker, currently playing for Mirassol.

== Biography ==
Born in Araras, São Paulo state, Wilson started his career at Corinthians. He spent two half season at Paulista FC in July 2005, from 2005 Campeonato Brasileiro Série B to 2006 Campeonato Paulista. In January 2008 he was signed by Italian Serie A team Genoa in 3 1/2-year contract for €1.1 million. Before that deal Corinthians only owned 50% economic rights and the other half was owned by Moacir da Cunha Viana. Corinthians later announced that the club only received R$ 0.689 million from Brod Island S.A. in its 2008 accounts. He was loaned back to Sport Recife at the start of 2008–09 Serie A. In July 2009 Sport signed him outright for free.

Wilson left for Chinese Super League club Shaanxi Chanba in February 2011. He left for Vegalta Sendai shortly after due to his lack of goals for the club.

== Club career statistics ==
Updated to 23 February 2017.

Club	Season	League	League		Cup^{1}		League Cup^{2}		Continental^{3}		Total	
Club	Season	League	Apps	Goals	Apps	Goals	Apps	Goals	Apps	Goals	Apps	Goals
Genoa	2007–08	Serie A	3	0			-	-	-	-	3	0
Genoa	Total		3	0			-	-	-	-	3	0
Sport Recife	2008	Série A	10	4					-	-	10	4
Sport Recife	2009	Série A	23	8					6	3	29	11
Sport Recife	2010	Série B	21	7					-	-	21	7
Sport Recife	Total		54	19					6	3	60	22
Shaanxi Chan-Ba	2011	CSL	24	3	2	0	-	-	-	-	26	3
Shaanxi Chan-Ba	Total		24	3	2	0	-	-	-	-	26	3
Vegalta Sendai	2012	J1 League	32	13	1	0	8	3	-	-	41	16
Vegalta Sendai	2013	J1 League	30	13	3	1	2	2	6	1	41	17
Vegalta Sendai	2014	J1 League	24	4	0	0	3	0	–		27	4
Vegalta Sendai	2015	J1 League	19	4	3	2	4	2	–		26	8
Vegalta Sendai	2016	J1 League	23	6	1	0	3	0	–		27	6
Vegalta Sendai	Total		128	40	8	3	20	7	6	1	152	51
Career total			209	75	11	3	28	10	12	4	250	92

^{1}Includes Emperor's Cup.

^{2}Includes J. League Cup.

^{3}Includes Copa Libertadores and AFC Champions League.

== Honours ==
- Brazilian First Division in 2005 with Corinthians
- Pernambuco state championship in 2010 with Sport Recife
- J. League Best Eleven: 2012
