= Naoya Tamura =

Japanese footballer

Naoya Tamura 田村 直也
Personal information
- Full name: Naoya Tamura
- Date of birth: 20 November 1984 (age 41)
- Place of birth: Tokyo, Japan
- Height: 1.75 m (5 ft 9 in)
- Position: Midfielder

Youth career
- 2000–2002: Tokyo Verdy 1969
- 2003–2006: Chuo University

Senior career*
Years	Team	Apps	(Gls)
2007–2013	Vegalta Sendai	160	(5)
2014–2019	Tokyo Verdy	157	(3)
Medal record
Vegalta Sendai
Runner-up	J1 League	2012
- * Club domestic league appearances and goals

Naoya Tamura (田村 直也, Tamura Naoya; born 20 November 1984) is a retired Japanese footballer.

== Club career stats ==
As of 1 January 2020.

Club performance			League		Cup		League Cup		Continental		Total	
Season	Club	League	Apps	Goals	Apps	Goals	Apps	Goals	Apps	Goals	Apps	Goals
Japan			League		Emperor's Cup		J. League Cup		AFC		Total	
2007	Vegalta Sendai	J2 League	15	1	0	0	-		-		15	1
2008	Vegalta Sendai	J2 League	36	2	0	0	-		-		36	2
2009	Vegalta Sendai	J2 League	23	1	4	0	-		-		27	1
2010	Vegalta Sendai	J1 League	27	0	0	0	5	1	-		32	1
2011	Vegalta Sendai	J1 League	19	0	3	2	3	0	-		25	3
2012	Vegalta Sendai	J1 League	26	1	2	0	6	1	-		34	2
2013	Vegalta Sendai	J1 League	14	0	2	0	1	0	3	0	20	0
2014	Tokyo Verdy	J2 League	38	1	1	0	-		-		39	1
2015	Tokyo Verdy	J2 League	29	1	0	0	-		-		29	1
2016	Tokyo Verdy	J2 League	33	0	2	0	-		-		35	0
2017	Tokyo Verdy	J2 League	17	1	1	0	-		-		18	1
2018	Tokyo Verdy	J2 League	31	0	0	0	-		-		31	0
2019	Tokyo Verdy	J2 League	9	0	1	0	-		-		10	0
Career total			317	8	16	2	15	2	3	0	351	12
