= Kodai Watanabe =

Japanese footballer

Kodai Watanabe 渡辺 広大
Personal information
- Full name: Kodai Watanabe
- Date of birth: 4 December 1986 (age 39)
- Place of birth: Chiba, Japan
- Height: 1.80 m (5 ft 11 in)
- Position: Centre back

Team information
- Current team: Vonds Ichihara

Youth career
- 2002–2004: Municipal Funabashi High School

Senior career*
Years	Team	Apps	(Gls)
2005–2014	Vegalta Sendai	170	(9)
2015–2016	Montedio Yamagata	52	(0)
2017–2019	Renofa Yamaguchi FC	61	(4)
2019	→ Thespakusatsu Gunma (loan)	34	(2)
2019–2022	Thespakusatsu Gunma	60	(3)
2023–	Vonds Ichihara	0	(0)
Medal record
Vegalta Sendai
Runner-up	J1 League	2012
- * Club domestic league appearances and goals as of 20 December 2022, 19:21 (UTC)

Kodai Watanabe (渡辺 広大, Watanabe Kōdai; born 4 December 1986) is a Japanese footballer who plays for Vonds Ichihara from 2023.

== Career ==
On 23 December 2022, Watanabe joined to Kantō club part of JRL, Vonds Ichihara for upcoming 2023 season.

== Career statistics ==
Updated to the end 2022 season.

=== Club ===
Club performance			League		Cup		League Cup		Continental		Total	
Season	Club	League	Apps	Goals	Apps	Goals	Apps	Goals	Apps	Goals	Apps	Goals
Japan			League		Emperor's Cup		League Cup		AFC		Total	
2005	Vegalta Sendai	J2 League	6	1	1	0	-		-		7	1
2006	Vegalta Sendai	J2 League	11	0	0	0	-		-		11	0
2007	Vegalta Sendai	J2 League	11	0	1	0	-		-		12	0
2008	Vegalta Sendai	J2 League	7	0	2	0	-		-		9	0
2009	Vegalta Sendai	J2 League	50	3	4	0	-		-		54	3
2010	Vegalta Sendai	J1 League	22	1	1	0	3	0	-		26	1
2011	Vegalta Sendai	J1 League	10	2	3	0	0	0	-		13	2
2012	Vegalta Sendai	J1 League	18	1	2	1	7	1	-		27	3
2013	Vegalta Sendai	J1 League	20	1	4	0	0	0	5	0	29	1
2014	Vegalta Sendai	J1 League	15	0	0	0	4	0	-		19	0
2015	Montedio Yamagata	J1 League	12	0	1	0	0	0	-		13	0
2016	Montedio Yamagata	J2 League	40	1	1	0	–		–		41	1
2017	Renofa Yamaguchi	J2 League	27	2	1	0	–		–		28	2
2018	Renofa Yamaguchi	J2 League	34	2	1	0	–		–		35	2
2019	Thespakusatsu Gunma (loan)	J3 League	34	2	0	0	–		–		34	2
2020	Thespakusatsu Gunma	J2 League	21	0	0	0	–		–		21	0
2021	Thespakusatsu Gunma	J2 League	30	3	2	0	–		–		32	3
2022	Thespakusatsu Gunma	J2 League	9	0	1	0	–		–		10	0
2023	Vonds Ichihara	Japanese Regional Leagues	0	0	0	0	–		–		0	0
Career total			379	19	27	1	14	1	5	0	425	21
