= Jiro Kamata =

Japanese footballer

Jiro Kamata 鎌田 次郎
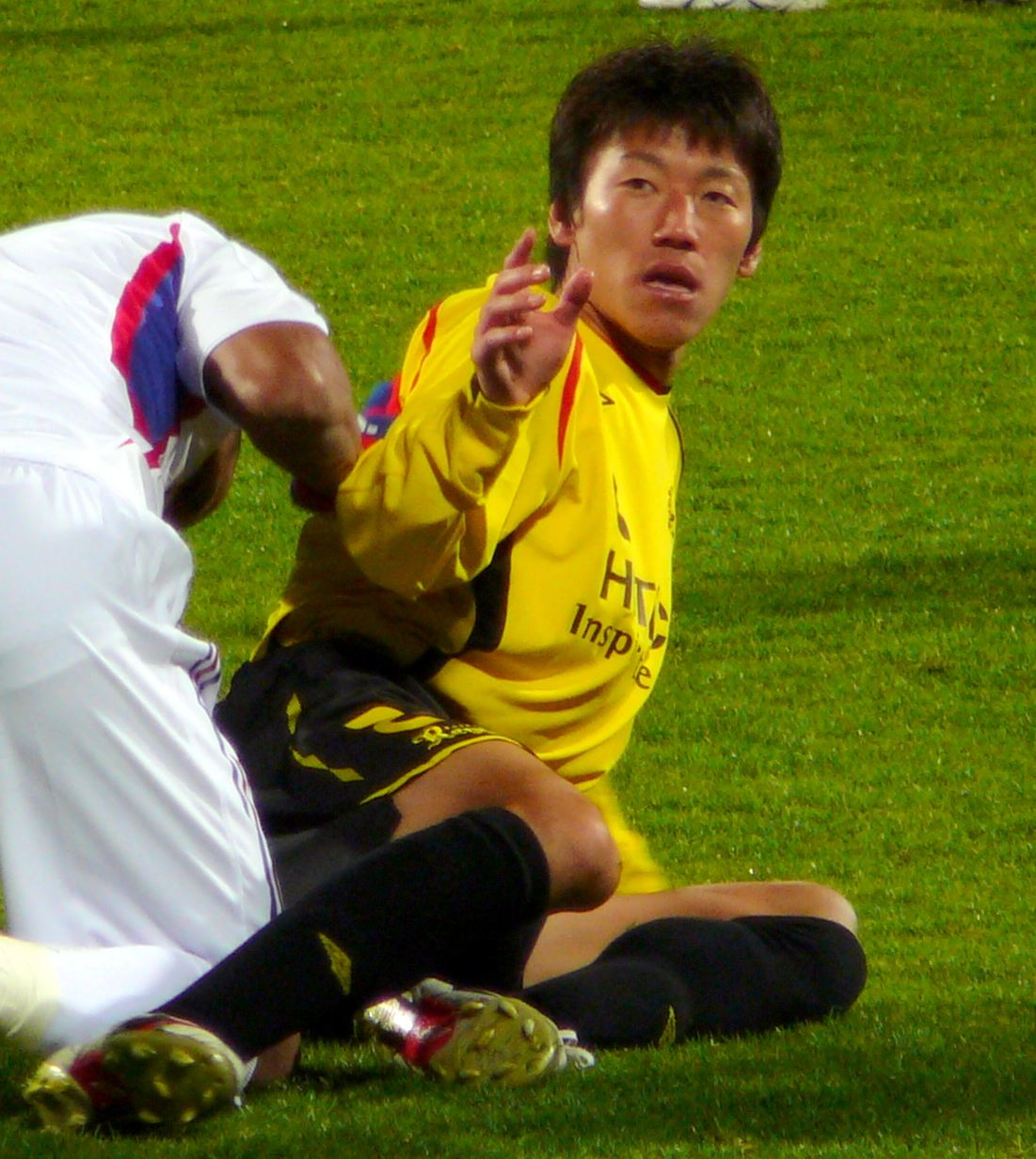

Personal information
- Full name: Jiro Kamata 鎌田 次郎
- Date of birth: 28 July 1985 (age 41)
- Place of birth: Ōta, Tokyo, Japan
- Height: 1.79 m (5 ft 10 in)
- Position: Defender

Youth career
- 1998–2003: FC Tokyo Youth

Senior career*
Years	Team	Apps	(Gls)
2005–2007	Ryutsu Keizai University	10	(0)
2006	→ Kashiwa Reysol (loan)	15	(0)
2008–2009	Kashiwa Reysol	37	(1)
2010–2015	Vegalta Sendai	176	(9)
2016–	Kashiwa Reysol	49	(0)
2021	→ SC Sagamihara (loan)		
2022	SC Sagamihara		
Medal record
Kashiwa Reysol
Runner-up	Emperor's Cup	2008
Vegalta Sendai
Runner-up	J1 League	2012
- * Club domestic league appearances and goals as of 21 January 2023

Jiro Kamata (鎌田 次郎, Kamata Jirō; born 28 July 1985 in Ōta, Tokyo) is a Japanese footballer who plays for Kashiwa Reysol.

== Club career statistics ==
Updated to 28 February 2019.

Club performance			League		Cup		League Cup		Asia		Total	
Season	Club	League	Apps	Goals	Apps	Goals	Apps	Goals	Apps	Goals	Apps	Goals
Japan			League		Emperor's Cup		J. League Cup		AFC		Total	
2005	Ryutsu Keizai University	JFL	2	0	-		-		-		2	0
2006	Ryutsu Keizai University	JFL	2	0	0	0	-		-		2	0
2006	Kashiwa Reysol	J2 League	15	0	0	0	-		-		15	0
2007	Ryutsu Keizai University	JFL	6	0	1	0	-		-		7	0
2008	Kashiwa Reysol	J1 League	26	1	0	0	5	1	-		31	2
2009	Kashiwa Reysol	J1 League	11	0	0	0	4	0	-		15	0
2010	Vegalta Sendai	J1 League	27	2	8	0	0	0	-		35	2
2011	Vegalta Sendai	J1 League	33	1	3	0	4	0	-		40	1
2012	Vegalta Sendai	J1 League	31	3	1	0	5	0	-		37	3
2013	Vegalta Sendai	J1 League	29	0	3	0	2	0	3	0	37	0
2014	Vegalta Sendai	J1 League	31	2	1	0	6	1	-		38	3
2015	Vegalta Sendai	J1 League	25	1	4	0	4	1	-		33	2
2016	Kashiwa Reysol	J1 League	16	0	1	0	4	0	-		21	0
2017	Kashiwa Reysol	J1 League	15	0	1	0	3	0	-		19	0
2018	Kashiwa Reysol	J1 League	18	0	1	0	0	0	0	0	19	0
Total			287	11	24	0	37	3	3	0	356	14
