= Shingo Tomita =

Japanese footballer

Shingo Tomita 富田 晋伍
Personal information
- Full name: Shingo Tomita
- Date of birth: 20 June 1986 (age 40)
- Place of birth: Ōhira, Tochigi, Japan
- Height: 1.69 m (5 ft 7 in)
- Position: Midfielder

Youth career
- 2002-2004: Tokyo Verdy 1969 Youth

Senior career*
Years	Team	Apps	(Gls)
2005–2022	Vegalta Sendai	436	(5)
Medal record
Vegalta Sendai
Runner-up	J1 League	2012
Runner-up	Emperor's Cup	2018
- * Club domestic league appearances and goals as of 22 December 2022

Shingo Tomita (富田 晋伍, Tomita Shingo; born 20 June 1986 in Ōhira, Tochigi) is a former Japanese football player.

== Club career stats ==
Updated to 22 December 2022.

Appearances and goals by club, season and competition
Club	Season	League			Emperor's Cup		League Cup		AFC		Total	
Club	Season	Division	Apps	Goals	Apps	Goals	Apps	Goals	Apps	Goals	Apps	Goals
Vegalta Sendai	2005	J2 League	17	0	1	0	–		–		18	0
Vegalta Sendai	2006	J2 League	16	0	2	0	–		–		18	0
Vegalta Sendai	2007	J2 League	18	1	1	0	–		–		19	1
Vegalta Sendai	2008	J2 League	24	0	1	0	–		–		27	0
Vegalta Sendai	2009	J2 League	34	0	4	0	–		–		38	0
Vegalta Sendai	2010	J1 League	26	0	1	0	7	0	–		34	0
Vegalta Sendai	2011	J1 League	31	0	1	0	4	1	–		36	1
Vegalta Sendai	2012	J1 League	29	2	1	0	5	0	–		35	2
Vegalta Sendai	2013	J1 League	32	0	4	0	2	0	4	0	42	0
Vegalta Sendai	2014	J1 League	34	1	1	0	6	0	–		41	1
Vegalta Sendai	2015	J1 League	34	0	3	1	3	0	–		40	1
Vegalta Sendai	2016	J1 League	33	1	1	0	2	1	–		36	2
Vegalta Sendai	2017	J1 League	25	0	0	0	2	0	–		27	0
Vegalta Sendai	2018	J1 League	30	0	5	0	4	0	–		39	0
Vegalta Sendai	2019	J1 League	27	0	1	0	6	0	–		34	0
Vegalta Sendai	2020	J1 League	0	0	–		0	0	–		0	0
Vegalta Sendai	2021	J1 League	21	0	1	0	5	0	–		27	0
Vegalta Sendai	2022	J2 League	5	0	0	0	–		–		7	0
Career total			436	5	28	1	46	2	4	0	518	8
