= 2016 Gamba Osaka season =

Gamba Osaka
2016 season
- Chairman: Teruhisa Noro
- Manager: Kenta Hasegawa
- J1 League: 4th
- Emperor's Cup: Quarter-final
- J.League Cup: Runner Up
- AFC Champions League: Group Stage
- Japanese Super Cup: Runner Up
- Top goalscorer: League: Ademilson 9 Shun Nagasawa 9 All: Ademilson 13
- Highest home attendance: 34,231 vs Yokohama F. Marinos (J1) on 2 April 2016
- Lowest home attendance: 8,789 vs Shimizu S-Pulse (Emperor's Cup) on 9 November 2016
- Average home league attendance: 25,342
Home colours	Away colours

The 2016 Gamba Osaka season was Gamba Osaka's 23rd season in the J1 League and 29th overall in the Japanese top flight. Like the previous season, the 2016 campaign was split into two stages, with the first stage running from February to June, the second stage being held between July and November and finally a Championship stage in late November. With city-rivals Cerezo Osaka failing to gain promotion from J2, Gamba's main rivalry match was the Hanshin derby against Vissel Kobe with an away game held in round 4 on the 19th March and the return home match in round 26 on August 20. Gamba finished in 6th place in the first stage of the season and 4th place in the second stage for an overall 4th-place finish.

Gamba's position as runner-up in the 2015 J1 League Championship saw them automatically qualify for the 2016 AFC Champions League, their eighth appearance in the competition. Looking to improve on their run to the semi-finals in 2015, they were drawn into the tough looking Group G along with Australian side Melbourne Victory, South Korea's Suwon Samsung Bluewings and big-spending Chinese outfit Shanghai SIPG. The group stage kicked off on Wednesday 24 February and concluded on Tuesday 3 May with all sides in the group playing each other home and away in a round-robin basis. Gamba were eliminated at the group stage with only 2 points from 6 games to show for their efforts.

As winners of the 2015 Emperor's Cup, Gamba competed in the season opening Japanese Super Cup, held in Yokohama on 20 February. The annually held match pitted Gamba against Sanfrecce Hiroshima, the side who defeated them in the final of the 2015 J1 League Championship. This was Gamba's 6th appearance in the Super Cup, however they were unable to build on their previous victories in 2007 and 2015 and lost 3–1. Trailing 2–0 due to early second half goals from Satō and Asano, top scorer of the previous 3 campaigns Takashi Usami pulled one back, however Utaka added a third for Hiroshima shortly afterwards to seal the win.

Later on in the season, Gamba entered the 2016 J.League Cup and 2016 Emperor's Cup. Due to their AFC Champions League commitments, they were given a bye past the J.League Cup group stage and entered in the quarter-finals. Similarly they entered the Emperor's Cup in the 4th round. They went all the way to the final of the J.League cup for the 3rd time in a row, however they lost out to the Urawa Red Diamonds in a penalty shoot-out. In the Emperor's Cup, they bowed out to Yokohama F. Marinos in the quarter-finals meaning that this would be their first season without any silverware since 2012.

This was Gamba's first season playing at the newly opened Suita City Football Stadium which was built in the same park as Osaka Expo '70 Stadium, their home from 1980–2015. The first official game to be held in the new stadium was on 14 February 2016, the pre-season Panasonic Cup match between Gamba and Nagoya Grampus which the home side won 3–1. The first league match was held in front of 32,463 spectators on 28 February against Kashima Antlers. It resulted in a 1–0 defeat against the team which went on to win the first stage of the 2016 J1 League The move to the new stadium was a huge success in terms of increasing attendance with average league attendances increasing from 15,999 in 2015 to 25,342 in 2016.

== Transfers ==
Coming off the back of a draining 2015 season which saw them play 60 games in all competitions, Gamba sought to add depth to their squad. In came experienced former Shimizu S-Pulse, Nagoya Grampus, Yokohama F. Marinos and Japan national team midfielder Jungo Fujimoto to compete for a right-wing slot with Hiroyuki Abe and Kotaro Omori. Ademilson who had spent the previous campaign as Fujimoto's teammate in Yokohama, moved west to Osaka on a season-long loan deal from São Paulo FC in his homeland. He is expected to battle with Shu Kurata for a place playing just off target-man Patric. In addition, Hiroto Goya, a prolific scorer at varsity level for Kwansei Gakuin University signed up for his first shot at professional football and two youngsters, Hiroki Noda and Kazunari Ichimi joined from Otsu High School in Kumamoto Prefecture. Noda, a native of Kumamoto has actually turned out for his local side Roasso Kumamoto on 5 occasions over the previous 2 seasons despite his tender age of just 18.

There were fewer departures than arrivals during the close season and crucially no starting-eleven members from the previous year were amongst those to leave. Veteran midfielder Tomokazu Myojin made a surprising move to Nagoya Grampus aged 38, following 10 years of sterling service to the club. Brazilian attacker Lins was also released. A promising debut season in 2014 which saw him net 8 times in 39 games including several crucial late winners gave way to a disappointing 2015 in which he started only 8 games and could only net 4 goals in 36 games in all competitions, therefore it was no surprise when his departure was announced. Finally, Shingo Akamine a close-season signing from Vegalta Sendai the previous year and who, like Lins had endured a frustrating 2015, announced he would be joining J2 side Fagiano Okayama on loan for 2016.

In addition to those main transfers; Kenya Okazaki, Naoki Ogawa and Shōhei Ogura rejoined the club following loan spells at Ehime FC, Fujieda MYFC and Montedio Yamagata respectively while Yuto Uchida who spent the 2015 season with Tokushima Vortis made his loan move into a permanent one.

In the summer transfer window, the big news was the departure of star attacker Takashi Usami to German Bundesliga side Augsburg. The move came 3 years after Usami had returned to Gamba following spells abroad with Bayern Munich and Hoffenheim. He had finished as the club's leading goalscorer in 2013, 2014 and 2015 and was again leading the Gamba goalscoring charts with 6 goals at the time of his departure. Veteran midfielder Takahiro Futagawa, who had spent most of the first half of the season with Gamba's Under-23 side in J3, also moved on and joined Tokyo Verdy on loan for the remaining six months of the campaign.

Brazilian forward Patric, who had endured a hugely disappointing campaign, injured his knee in October and was released by the club in order to complete his rehabilitation in his native country. Also in October, Patric's compatriot, Ademilson, turned his loan move from São Paulo into a permanent one.

=== In ===
No.	Pos	Player	Transferred From	Fee	Date	Source
9	FW	(Brazil) Ademilson	(Brazil) São Paulo	Loan	8 Jan	
17	MF	(Japan) Kenya Okazaki	(Japan) Ehime FC	Loan Return	17 Jan	
23	FW	(Japan) Hiroto Goya	(Japan) Kwansei Gakuin University	Unknown	17 Jan	
24	FW	(Japan) Naoki Ogawa	(Japan) Fujieda MYFC	Loan Return	17 Jan	
25	MF	(Japan) Jungo Fujimoto	(Japan) Yokohama F. Marinos	Unknown	11 Jan	
32	DF	(Japan) Hiroki Noda	(Japan) Ohzu High School	Unknown	17 Jan	
33	FW	(Japan) Kazunari Ichimi	(Japan) Ohzu High School	Unknown	17 Jan	
40	MF	(Japan) Shōhei Ogura	(Japan) Montedio Yamagata	Loan Return	17 Jan	
9	FW	(Brazil) Ademilson	(Brazil) São Paulo	Unknown	14 October	

=== Out ===
No.	Pos	Player	Transferred To	Fee	Date	Source
9	FW	(Brazil) Lins	Released	Free	2 Jan	
17	MF	(Japan) Tomokazu Myojin	(Japan) Nagoya Grampus	Unknown	6 Jan	
23	DF	(Japan) Yuto Uchida	(Japan) Tokushima Vortis	Unknown	6 Jan	
24	FW	(Japan) Shingo Akamine	(Japan) Fagiano Okayama	Loan	7 Jan	
10	MF	(Japan) Takahiro Futagawa	(Japan) Tokyo Verdy	Loan	1 Jul	
39	FW	(Japan) Takashi Usami	(Germany) FC Augsburg	Unknown	1 Jul	
39	FW	(Brazil) Patric	released	Unknown	21 Oct	

== First team squad ==
As of the beginning of 2016 season.

No.	Name	Nationality	Position(s)	Date of birth (age)	Height (cm)	Weight (kg)	Since	Previous club	Games played	Goals scored
Goalkeepers
1	Masaaki Higashiguchi	(Japan)	GK	May 12, 1986 (aged 30)	184	78	2014	Albirex Niigata	105	0
16	Ken Tajiri	(Japan)	GK	June 11, 1993 (aged 23)	182	76	2013	Gamba Osaka Youth	0	0
18	Yōsuke Fujigaya	(Japan)	GK	February 13, 1981 (aged 35)	185	78	2015	Júbilo Iwata	342	0
31	Mizuki Hayashi	(Japan)	GK	September 4, 1996 (aged 20)	182	74	2015	Gamba Osaka Youth	0	0
Defenders
3	Takaharu Nishino	(Japan)	CB	September 14, 1993 (aged 23)	187	73	2012	Gamba Osaka Youth	66	6
4	Hiroki Fujiharu	(Japan)	LB	November 28, 1988 (aged 28)	175	60	2011	Osaka University of H&SS	199	8
5	Daiki Niwa	(Japan)	CB	January 16, 1986 (aged 30)	180	76	2012	Avispa Fukuoka*	137	6
6	Kim Jung-ya	(Japan) / (South Korea)	CB	May 17, 1988 (aged 28)	183	74	2014	Sagan Tosu*	58	0
8	Keisuke Iwashita	(Japan)	CB	September 24, 1986 (aged 30)	181	76	2012	Shimizu S-Pulse	117	5
14	Koki Yonekura	(Japan)	RB	May 17, 1988 (aged 28)	176	68	2014	JEF United	84	7
22	Oh Jae-suk	(South Korea)	RB / LB	January 4, 1990 (aged 26)	178	74	2013	(South Korea) Gangwon FC	64	0
30	So Hirao	(Japan)	RB	July 1, 1996 (aged 20)	170	68	2015	Gamba Osaka Youth	2	0
32	Hiroki Noda	(Japan)	CB	July 27, 1997 (aged 19)	181	73	2016	Otsu High School	0	0
35	Ryo Hatsuse	(Japan)	RB / LB	July 10, 1997 (aged 19)	175	64	2015	Gamba Osaka Youth	0	0
Midfielders
7	Yasuhito Endō (c)	(Japan)	CM / AM	January 28, 1980 (aged 36)	178	75	2001	Kyoto Purple Sanga	614	118
10	Takahiro Futagawa	(Japan)	RM / LM	June 27, 1980 (aged 36)	168	63	1999	Gamba Osaka Youth	598	87
11	Shu Kurata	(Japan)	RW / LW / AM	November 26, 1988 (aged 28)	172	68	2012	Cerezo Osaka*	204	36
13	Hiroyuki Abe	(Japan)	RW	July 5, 1989 (aged 27)	170	69	2012	Kwansei Gakuin University	154	26
15	Yasuyuki Konno	(Japan)	CB / DM	January 25, 1983 (aged 33)	178	73	2012	FC Tokyo	173	14
17	Kenya Okazaki	(Japan)	CM / RM / LM	May 31, 1990 (aged 26)	173	62	2016	Ehime FC*	29	2
19	Kotaro Omori	(Japan)	RW / LW	April 28, 1992 (aged 24)	167	63	2011	Gamba Osaka Youth	111	14
21	Yosuke Ideguchi	(Japan)	CM	August 23, 1996 (aged 20)	171	69	2014	Gamba Osaka Youth	22	0
25	Jungo Fujimoto	(Japan)	RW	March 24, 1984 (aged 32)	173	69	2016	Yokohama F. Marinos	0	0
26	Naoya Senoo	(Japan)	LB / LM	August 15, 1996 (aged 20)	172	60	2015	Gamba Osaka Youth	1	0
27	Tatsuya Uchida	(Japan)	CB / DM	February 8, 1992 (aged 24)	177	70	2011	Gamba Osaka Youth	70	1
28	Shota Yomesaka	(Japan)	CB / LB / LM	October 19, 1996 (aged 20)	177	67	2014	Gamba Osaka Youth	0	0
36	Mizuki Ichimaru	(Japan)	CM / RM	May 8, 1997 (aged 19)	174	66	2016	Gamba Osaka Youth	0	0
38	Ritsu Doan	(Japan)	RM / LM	June 16, 1998 (aged 18)	172	70	2015	Gamba Osaka Youth	4	0
40	Shōhei Ogura	(Japan)	RB / CB / DM	September 8, 1985 (aged 31)	174	67	2015	Yokohama F. Marinos	10	0
Strikers
9	Ademilson	(Brazil)	AM / CF	January 9, 1994 (aged 22)	176	74	2016	(Brazil) São Paulo (loan)	0	0
20	Shun Nagasawa	(Japan)	CF	August 25, 1988 (aged 28)	192	82	2015	Shimizu S-Pulse	11	5
23	Hiroto Goya	(Japan)	CF	January 2, 1994 (aged 22)	177	68	2016	Kwansei Gakuin University	0	0
24	Naoki Ogawa	(Japan)	AM / CF	July 3, 1995 (aged 21)	168	62	2016	Fujieda MYFC*	3	1
29	Patric	(Brazil)	CF	October 26, 1987 (aged 29)	189	82	2014	(Brazil) Atlético Goianiense	82	36
33	Kazunari Ichimi	(Japan)	CF	November 10, 1997 (aged 19)	183	74	2016	Otsu High School	0	0
37	Akito Takagi	(Japan)	CF	August 4, 1997 (aged 19)	175	68	2016	Gamba Osaka Youth	1	0
39	Takashi Usami	(Japan)	LW / AM / CF	May 6, 1992 (aged 24)	178	69	2013	(Germany) Hoffenheim*	172	86

* indicates player returned to Gamba Osaka from a loan spell with this club.

== Pre-season friendlies ==
Date	Opponents	H / A	Result F-A	Scorers	Attendance
14 February 2016	Nagoya Grampus	H	3–1	o.g. 26', Konno 36', Niwa 66'	35,231

== Japanese Super Cup ==
As winners of the 2015 Emperor's Cup, Gamba squared off against reigning J1 League champions Sanfrecce Hiroshima at Nissan Stadium, Yokohama. The match ended up in a 3–1 defeat for Gamba, with Hisato Satō opening the scoring for Sanfrecce in the 52nd minute and Takuma Asano adding a second from the penalty spot 5 minutes later. Takashi Usami pulled a goal back for Gamba in the 68th minute but it wasn't enough as Sanfrecce's new Nigerian signing Peter Utaka wrapped up the game with 17 minutes remaining. The result means that Gamba have now won just 2 of their 6 appearances in the Japanese Super Cup with victories in 2007 and 2015 and defeats in 2006, 2009, 2010 and 2016. One other point to note is that this game saw the competitive debuts in a Gamba shirt for attacking midfielders Ademilson and Jungo Fujimoto, both of whom joined from Yokohama F. Marinos in the close season.

Date	Opponents	H / A	Result F-A	Scorers	Attendance
20 February 2016	Sanfrecce Hiroshima	N	1–3	Usami 68'	33,805

== J1 League First Stage ==
The first half of the 2016 J1 League season was a disappointing one for Gamba and ended up in a 6th-place finish. Results were wildly inconsistent with 7 wins 3 draws and 7 defeats. Goalscoring was a real issue, especially early on, with only 9 goals in their first 10 games. They also failed to score more than once in 11 out of their 17 games.

In gameweeks 11–17, which followed their AFC Champions League exit, matches featured higher scoring outcomes and a change in defensive patterns compared with earlier in the season. This was illustrated by consecutive 3–3 home draws against Shonan Bellmare and Nagoya Grampus.

In terms of team selection, the early weeks of the season where Gamba had to balance J1 League and Champions League commitments saw coach Kenta Hasegawa rotate his squad a lot. The full back and attacking midfield berths saw the most instability. While an injury to South Korean full-back Oh Jae-suk and the game time allowed to youngster Ryo Hatsuse with Gamba's Under-23 side in J3 saw Koki Yonekura and Hiroki Fujiharu become the established right-back and left-back respectively, the strongest combination of attacking midfielders in the favoured 4–2–3–1 formation was never determined. Takashi Usami, Shu Kurata, Hiroyuki Abe and Kotaro Omori had all been retained from the previous year, where the latter 3 tended to be rotated. However, the close-season signings of Ademilson and Jungo Fujimoto from Yokohama F. Marinos gave Gamba excessive depth in that area. Ademilson acquitted himself well with 4 goals which came both from attacking midfield and also centre-forward, however Fujimoto struggled to establish himself and had to turn out occasionally for Gamba U-23 to get game time after Gamba's Champions League elimination.

Returning to the theme of goalscoring, perhaps the biggest concern from the first half of the season was the poor goal return of Patric who failed to find the target in 13 appearances. Following two goal-laden seasons in which he and Usami had scored 50 goals between them, they could only muster 6 goals during the first 17 games of this campaign. Indeed, Patric often found himself playing off the bench with his compatriot Ademilson or the tall Shun Nagasawa starting in his place. In light of this, Usami's departure for Germany in mid-season would prove to be a major worry for Gamba going forward.

=== Results ===
Round	Date	Opponents	H / A	Result F–A	Scorers	Attendance	League position
1	28 February 2016	Kashima Antlers	H	0–1		32,463	13th
2	6 March 2016	Ventforet Kofu	A	1–0	Nagasawa 36'	14,103	12th
3	11 March 2016	Omiya Ardija	H	2–1	Konno 49', Abe 60'	20,535	4th
4	19 March 2016	Vissel Kobe	A	1–2	Kim 84'	16,026	7th
5	2 April 2016	Yokohama F. Marinos	H	1–2	Ademilson 19'	34,231	12th
6	10 April 2016	Vegalta Sendai	A	3–1	Nagasawa 5', Usami 14', Ademilson 15'	18,011	8th
7	15 April 2016	Kashiwa Reysol	H	0–1		13,731	8th
8	24 April 2016	Avispa Fukuoka	A	1–0	Usami 79'	18,508	8th
9	29 April 2016	Kawasaki Frontale	H	0–1		33,941	9th
10	8 May 2016	Albirex Niigata	A	0–0		27,439	10th
11	13 May 2016	Júbilo Iwata	H	2–1	Ademilson 45', Endō 66'	17,299	8th
12	21 May 2016	Sanfrecce Hiroshima	A	3–1	Ademilson 23', Kurata 64', Nagasawa 82'	17,220	6th
13	29 May 2016	FC Tokyo	A	0–1		37,805	8th
14	11 June 2016	Shonan Bellmare	H	3–3	Konno 45'+2, Iwashita 58', Usami 82'	22,257	8th
15	15 June 2016	Urawa Red Diamonds	H	1–0	Usami 8'	29,397	6th
16	18 June 2016	Sagan Tosu	A	1–2	Usami 44'	14,450	6th
17	25 June 2016	Nagoya Grampus	H	3–3	Abe 45', Kim 54', Konno 87'	33,546	6th

=== Match Day Line-Ups ===
The following players appeared for Gamba Osaka during the 2016 J1 League First Stage:

Player Appearances – 2016 J1 League First Stage
Round	Opponent	GK	RB	LB	CB	CB	CM	CM	RW	LW	AM	CF	Substituted on	Substituted on	Substituted on
1	Kashima Antlers	Higashiguchi	Yonekura	Fujiharu	Niwa (substituted off)	Kim	Endō	Konno	Fujimoto	Omori (substituted off)	Ademilson (substituted off)	Nagasawa	Kurata	Ideguchi	Usami
2	Ventforet Kofu	Higashiguchi	Oh	Hatsuse	Konno	Kim	Endō	Uchida (substituted off)	Abe	Usami	Kurata (substituted off)	Nagasawa (substituted off)	Omori	Ideguchi	Goya
3	Omiya Ardija	Higashiguchi	Oh	Fujiharu	Konno	Kim	Endō	Ideguchi	Abe (substituted off)	Omori (substituted off)	Usami (substituted off)	Nagasawa	Kurata	Goya	Fujimoto
4	Vissel Kobe	Higashiguchi	Hatsuse	Fujiharu	Konno	Kim	Endō	Uchida (substituted off)	Abe (substituted off)	Usami	Kurata (substituted off)	Nagasawa	Ademilson	Ideguchi	Patric
5	Yokohama F. Marinos	Higashiguchi	Yonekura (substituted off)	Fujiharu	Konno	Kim	Endō	Ideguchi	Ademilson	Usami	Kurata (substituted off)	Patric	Goya	Hatsuse	
6	Vegalta Sendai	Higashiguchi	Oh	Fujiharu	Niwa	Kim	Endō (substituted off)	Konno	Abe	Usami (substituted off)	Ademilson (substituted off)	Nagasawa	Kurata	Omori	Ogura
7	Kashiwa Reysol	Higashiguchi	Oh	Fujiharu	Niwa	Kim	Endō	Konno	Abe (substituted off)	Usami	Ademilson (substituted off)	Nagasawa (substituted off)	Kurata	Omori	Patric
8	Avispa Fukuoka	Higashiguchi	Oh	Fujiharu	Niwa	Kim	Endō	Konno	Abe	Kurata (substituted off)	Goya (substituted off)	Patric	Fujimoto	Usami	
9	Kawasaki Frontale	Higashiguchi	Hatsuse	Fujiharu	Niwa	Kim	Endō	Konno	Abe (substituted off)	Usami	Kurata (substituted off)	Patric (substituted off)	Nagasawa	Goya (substituted off)	Fujimoto
10	Albirex Niigata	Higashiguchi	Yonekura	Fujiharu	Niwa	Iwashita	Endō (substituted off)	Konno	Abe	Usami	Ademilson (substituted off)	Nagasawa (substituted off)	Kurata	Ideguchi	Patric
11	Júbilo Iwata	Higashiguchi	Yonekura	Fujiharu	Niwa	Iwashita (substituted off)	Ideguchi	Konno	Ademilson (substituted off)	Usami (substituted off)	Endō	Patric	Kim	Kurata	Fujimoto
12	Sanfrecce Hiroshima	Higashiguchi	Yonekura	Fujiharu	Niwa	Iwashita	Endō	Konno	Ademilson (substituted off)	Usami	Kurata (substituted off)	Patric (substituted off)	Omori	Nagasawa	Ogura
13	FC Tokyo	Higashiguchi	Yonekura	Fujiharu	Niwa	Iwashita	Endō (substituted off)	Konno	Ademilson (substituted off)	Usami	Kurata	Patric (substituted off)	Omori	Goya	Fujimoto
14	Shonan Bellmare	Higashiguchi	Yonekura	Fujiharu	Niwa	Iwashita	Endō	Konno	Ademilson (substituted off)	Usami	Kurata (substituted off)	Patric (substituted off)	Omori	Goya	Fujimoto
15	Urawa Red Diamonds	Higashiguchi	Niwa	Fujiharu	Kim	Iwashita	Ideguchi	Konno	Abe	Usami (substituted off)	Endō	Ademilson (substituted off)	Kurata	Patric	
16	Sagan Tosu	Higashiguchi	Niwa	Fujiharu	Kim (substituted off)	Iwashita (substituted off)	Ideguchi	Konno	Abe	Usami	Endō	Ademilson (substituted off)	Kurata	Yonekura	Patric
17	Nagoya Grampus	Higashiguchi	Yonekura	Fujiharu	Niwa	Kim	Endō	Konno (substituted off)	Abe	Usami	Kurata (substituted off)	Patric (substituted off)	Ademilson	Omori	Ideguchi

(substituted on) = Substitute on, (substituted off) = Substitute Off, = Number of goals scored, = Yellow Card and = Red Card.

== J1 League Second Stage ==
Freed from Asian Champions League commitments, Gamba performed much better during the second stage of the 2016 J1 League season finishing with a record of 10 wins, 4 draws and 3 defeats which saw them come home in 4th place in both the second stage and overall league tables. Impressive away victories over Kashima Antlers and Kawasaki Frontale bookended what was a half of the season largely full of positives.

The mid-season departure of Takashi Usami was not felt as keenly as first feared with the team netting 31 times in 17 games, Shun Nagasawa found the back of the net 6 times, Ademilson 5 and impressive central-midfielder Yosuke Ideguchi, buoyed by his appearance in the Olympics provided 4 in what was a great overall team effort.

The only negatives were the disappointing 0–0 draw at home to league whipping boys Avispa Fukuoka, the painful 1–0 derby defeat against Vissel Kobe in which Ademilson missed a penalty which would have salvaged a draw and also the chastening 4–0 reverse away to second stage champions Urawa Red Diamonds.

Gamba's 4th-place finish in the overall standings left them waiting on the result of the Emperor's Cup to know whether or not they had qualified for the following season's Champions League.

Round	Date	Opponents	H / A	Result F–A	Scorers	Attendance	League position
18	2 July 2016	Kashima Antlers	A	3–1	Omori 26', Konno 60', Kim 73'	21,524	5th
19	9 July 2016	Vegalta Sendai	H	3–1	Yonekura 14', Patric 78', 90'+2	19,482	3rd
20	13 July 2016	Omiya Ardija	A	0–0		9,873	4th
21	17 July 2016	Avispa Fukuoka	H	0–0		23,540	4th
22	23 July 2016	Kashiwa Reysol	A	2–3	Ademilson 16', Nakatani o.g. 23'	13,808	7th
23	30 July 2016	Sanfrecce Hiroshima	H	1–0	Abe 52'	32,444	6th
24	6 August 2016	Sagan Tosu	H	2–1	Fujita o.g. 61', Nagasawa 90'+2	17,355	4th
25	13 August 2016	Júbilo Iwata	A	2–0	Ademilson 57', Nagasawa 83'	23,144	3rd
26	20 August 2016	Vissel Kobe	H	0–1		26,520	4th
27	27 August 2016	Shonan Bellmare	A	2–1	Nagasawa 26', 64'	10,664	4th
28	10 September 2016	Ventforet Kofu	H	2–1	Nagasawa 8', Kurata 80'	17,921	3rd
29	17 September 2016	Nagoya Grampus	A	3–1	Omori 27', Ademilson 65', Ideguchi 90'+1	29,481	2nd
30	25 September 2016	FC Tokyo	H	3–3	Omori 15', Nagasawa 18', Fujiharu 90'+1	30,141	3rd
31	1 October 2016	Urawa Red Diamonds	A	0–4		43,415	5th
32	22 October 2016	Yokohama F. Marinos	A	2–2	Ideguchi 45'+1, 88'	38,380	4th
33	29 October 2016	Albirex Niigata	H	3–1	Ademilson 5', Endō (pen.) 60', Goya 90'+8	26,003	4th
34	3 November 2016	Kawasaki Frontale	A	3–2	Fujiharu 65', Ideguchi 66', Ademilson 76'	25,694	4th

=== Match Day Line-Ups ===
The following players appeared for Gamba Osaka during the 2016 J1 League Second Stage:

Player appearances – 2016 J1 League Second Stage
Round	Opponent	GK	RB	LB	CB	CB	CM	CM	RW	LW	AM	CF	Substituted on	Substituted on	Substituted on
18	Kashima Antlers	Higashiguchi	Yonekura	Fujiharu	Niwa	Kim	Endō	Konno	Abe	Omori (substituted off)	Kurata	Ademilson (substituted off)	Ideguchi	Patric	
19	Vegalta Sendai	Higashiguchi	Yonekura	Fujiharu	Niwa	Kim	Endō	Konno	Abe	Omori (substituted off)	Kurata (substituted off)	Ademilson (substituted off)	Ideguchi	Oh	Patric
20	Omiya Ardija	Higashiguchi	Oh	Fujiharu	Niwa	Kim	Endō	Konno	Abe (substituted off)	Omori	Kurata (substituted off)	Patric (substituted off)	Ademilson	Ideguchi	Fujimoto
21	Avispa Fukuoka	Higashiguchi	Yonekura	Fujiharu	Niwa	Iwashita (substituted off)	Ideguchi	Konno	Abe (substituted off)	Kurata	Endō	Patric (substituted off)	Ademilson	Nagasawa	Fujimoto
22	Kashiwa Reysol	Higashiguchi	Yonekura	Oh	Niwa	Kim	Endō	Konno	Abe (substituted off)	Omori (substituted off)	Kurata	Ademilson (substituted off)	Nagasawa	Patric	Doan
23	Sanfrecce Hiroshima	Higashiguchi	Yonekura	Oh	Niwa	Kim	Endō (substituted off)	Konno	Abe	Kurata	Ademilson (substituted off)	Nagasawa (substituted off)	Omori	Uchida	Patric
24	Sagan Tosu	Higashiguchi	Yonekura	Oh	Niwa	Kim	Endō	Konno	Abe	Kurata	Ademilson (substituted off)	Goya (substituted off)	Omori	Nagasawa	
25	Júbilo Iwata	Higashiguchi	Yonekura	Oh	Niwa	Kim	Endō (substituted off)	Konno	Abe (substituted off)	Omori (substituted off)	Kurata	Ademilson	Nagasawa	Hatsuse	Doan
26	Vissel Kobe	Higashiguchi	Yonekura (substituted off)	Oh	Niwa	Kim	Endō	Konno	Abe (substituted off)	Omori	Kurata (substituted off)	Ademilson	Fujiharu	Nagasawa	Doan
27	Shonan Bellmare	Higashiguchi	Oh	Fujiharu	Niwa	Kim	Endō	Ideguchi	Omori	Kurata (substituted off)	Ademilson (substituted off)	Nagasawa (substituted off)	Nishino	Abe	Patric
28	Ventforet Kofu	Higashiguchi	Yonekura	Fujiharu	Niwa	Kim	Endō	Ideguchi	Abe (substituted off)	Kurata	Ademilson (substituted off)	Nagasawa (substituted off)	Konno	Omori	Goya
29	Nagoya Grampus	Higashiguchi	Oh (substituted off)	Fujiharu	Niwa	Kim	Endō (substituted off)	Ideguchi	Omori	Kurata	Ademilson (substituted off)	Nagasawa	Nishino	Yonekura	Konno
30	FC Tokyo	Higashiguchi	Yonekura	Fujiharu	Niwa	Kim	Ideguchi	Konno (substituted off)	Omori (substituted off)	Kurata	Ademilson (substituted off)	Nagasawa	Endō	Goya	Fujimoto
31	Urawa Red Diamonds	Higashiguchi	Oh	Fujiharu	Niwa	Nishino	Endō (substituted off)	Ideguchi	Kurata	Omori (substituted off)	Ademilson	Nagasawa (substituted off)	Konno	Goya	Fujimoto
32	Yokohama F. Marinos	Higashiguchi	Yonekura (substituted off)	Oh	Niwa	Kim	Ideguchi	Konno	Fujimoto	Omori	Endō (substituted off)	Goya (substituted off)	Fujiharu	Kurata	Nagasawa
33	Albirex Niigata	Higashiguchi	Oh	Fujiharu	Iwashita	Kim	Ideguchi	Konno	Fujimoto (substituted off)	Kurata (substituted off)	Endō	Ademilson (substituted off)	Abe	Omori	Goya
34	Kawasaki Frontale	Higashiguchi	Oh	Fujiharu	Iwashita (substituted off)	Kim	Ideguchi	Konno	Kurata	Omori (substituted off)	Endō	Ademilson	Abe	Goya	

(substituted on) = Substitute on, (substituted off) = Substitute Off, = Number of goals scored, = Yellow Card and = Red Card.

== AFC Champions League ==
Gamba were drawn in Group G along with Australian side Melbourne Victory, Korean outfit Suwon Samsung Bluewings and China's Shanghai SIPG. It was to prove a disappointing campaign for them culminating in an exit at the group stage, a strong contrast with the previous season's run to the semi-finals. An inability to find the back of the net which had plagued their early form in J1 also proved to be their downfall in the Champions League with only 4 goals scored in 6 games.

Draws in their opening two games away to Samsung and at home to Melbourne were to prove the high points as they were followed by a run of four defeats in a row, three of which came by a solitary goal. As it happened, Sven-Göran Eriksson's Shanghai side ran out group winners with 12 points, 3 ahead of both Melbourne and Samsung on 9. It was Melbourne who advanced with them, with their final round win over a largely second string Gamba side giving them the points they required to overtake Suwon due to having a better head-to-head record in matches played between the two sides. Gamba finished fourth and last in the group.

=== Results ===
Round	Date	Opponents	H / A	Result F–A	Scorers	Attendance	League position
1	24 February 2016	Samsung Bluewings	A	0–0		9,947	2nd=
2	2 March 2016	Melbourne Victory	H	1–1	Endō 57'	14,270	3rd
3	15 March 2016	Shanghai SIPG	A	1–2	Patric 60'	29,005	3rd
4	6 April 2016	Shanghai SIPG	H	0–2		14,756	4th
5	19 April 2016	Samsung Bluewings	H	1–2	Konno 89'	10,846	4th
6	3 May 2016	Melbourne Victory	A	1–2	Ademilson 84'	10,147	4th

=== Match Day Line-Ups ===
The following players appeared for Gamba Osaka during the 2016 AFC Champions League:

Player Appearances – 2016 AFC Champions League
Round	Opponent	GK	RB	LB	CB	CB	CM	CM	RW	LW	AM	CF	Substituted on	Substituted on	Substituted on
1	Samsung Bluewings	Higashiguchi	Oh	Fujiharu	Niwa	Kim	Ideguchi	Konno	Abe (substituted off)	Usami (substituted off)	Kurata	Patric (substituted off)	Endō	Yonekura	Nagasawa
2	Melbourne Victory	Higashiguchi	Oh	Fujiharu	Konno	Kim	Ideguchi	Endō	Abe	Usami (substituted off)	Kurata (substituted off)	Patric	Ademilson	Omori	
3	Shanghai SIPG	Higashiguchi	Oh (substituted off)	Fujiharu	Konno	Kim	Ideguchi	Endō	Abe (substituted off)	Omori (substituted off)	Usami	Patric	Kurata	Yonekura	Fujimoto
4	Shanghai SIPG	Higashiguchi	Yonekura	Fujiharu	Konno	Kim	Ideguchi (substituted off)	Endō	Ademilson	Usami	Kurata (substituted off)	Patric (substituted off)	Nishino	Nagasawa	Fujimoto
5	Samsung Bluewings	Higashiguchi	Oh (substituted off)	Fujiharu	Niwa	Kim	Konno	Endō	Fujimoto	Usami	Ademilson (substituted off)	Nagasawa (substituted off)	Kurata	Yonekura	Patric
6	Melbourne Victory	Fujigaya	Yonekura	Hatsuse	Niwa	Iwashita	Ideguchi	Uchida (substituted off)	Fujimoto	Omori (substituted off)	Ademilson	Nagasawa (substituted off)	Futagawa	Goya	Doan

(substituted on) = Substitute on, (substituted off) = Substitute Off, = Number of goals scored, = Yellow Card and = Red Card.

== J.League Cup ==
As a result of their qualification for the AFC Champions League, Gamba were given a bye into the quarter-finals of the League Cup, where they were paired against Sanfrecce Hiroshima in a two-legged encounter. A 1–1 draw in Hiroshima was followed by an emphatic 6–3 home win for Gamba which saw them qualify for the semi-finals and a tie against Yokohama F. Marinos in October. The first leg, held in Osaka, finished 0–0 and the second leg was also a draw, this time 1–1 which saw Gamba through on away goals and paved the way for a 3rd league cup final appearance in 3 years. The final was played against Urawa Red Diamonds at Saitama Stadium 2002 on Saturday 15 October 2016.

A solo run by Ademilson gave Gamba a first half lead which lasted until the 76th minute when Tadanari Lee's header squared things up. Extra-time followed and Gamba came agonisingly close to netting the winner in the 120th minute when Hiroto Goya's shot was deflected past the goalkeeper and onto the post, it then proceeded to roll along the goal line before being swept to safety by Urawa defender Ryota Moriwaki. It was perhaps an omen as following 3 successful penalty kicks for each side, Goya had his spot-kick saved by Shusaku Nishikawa. This proved to be the decisive miss as the Reds netted all of their penalties and went on to win the shootout 5–4.

This was Gamba's 5th appearance in the J.League Cup final and their 3rd in as many years. To date they have lifted the trophy twice, in 2007 and 2014 with this defeat being their 3rd defeat in the final, following reverses in 2005 and 2015.

Round	Date	Opponents	H / A	Result F-A	Scorers	Attendance
QF	31 August 2016	Sanfrecce Hiroshima	A	1–1	Goya 86'	5,529
QF	4 September 2016	Sanfrecce Hiroshima	H	6–3	Nagasawa 32', 45'+2, Niwa 55', Ademilson 60', 63', Abe 71'	12,977
SF	5 October 2016	Yokohama F. Marinos	H	0–0		11,160
SF	9 October 2016	Yokohama F. Marinos	A	1–1	Endō 63'	19,378
F	15 October 2016	Urawa Red Diamonds	N	1-1aet 4-5pens	Ademilson 17'	51,248

=== Match Day Line-Ups ===
The following players appeared for Gamba Osaka during the 2016 J.League Cup:

Player Appearances – 2016 J.League Cup
Round	Opponent	GK	RB	LB	CB	CB	CM	CM	RW	LW	AM	FW	Substituted on	Substituted on	Substituted on
QF	Sanfrecce Hiroshima	Fujigaya	Yonekura	Fujiharu	Niwa	Kim	Ideguchi (substituted off)	Kurata	Abe	Omori	Fujimoto (substituted off)	Patric (substituted off)	Nagasawa	Goya	Uchida
QF	Sanfrecce Hiroshima	Fujigaya	Yonekura	Fujiharu	Niwa	Kim	Ideguchi	Endō	Abe	Omori (substituted off)	Ademilson (substituted off)	Nagasawa (substituted off)	Kurata	Goya	Fujimoto
SF	Yokohama F. Marinos	Fujigaya	Yonekura	Fujiharu	Niwa	Kim	Ideguchi	Konno	Fujimoto (substituted off)	Omori	Kurata	Patric (substituted off)	Ademilson	Goya	
SF	Yokohama F. Marinos	Fujigaya	Yonekura	Fujiharu	Niwa	Kim	Ideguchi	Konno	Fujimoto (substituted off)	Kurata	Endō (substituted off)	Ademilson (substituted off)	Iwashita	Omori	Nagasawa
F	Urawa Red Diamonds	Higashiguchi	Yonekura	Fujiharu	Niwa	Kim	Ideguchi	Konno	Kurata (substituted off)	Omori (substituted off)	Endō	Ademilson (substituted off)	Nagasawa	Goya	Fujimoto

(substituted on) = Substitute on, (substituted off) = Substitute Off, = Number of goals scored, = Yellow Card and = Red Card.

== Emperor's Cup ==
Gamba began their defence of the title they've won for the past 2 seasons at home to J2 side Shimizu S-Pulse on November 9. Shun Nagasawa's strike in extra time was enough to see them through to the quarter-finals where they were paired with Yokohama F. Marinos in what would be the 5th meeting of the season between the two teams. Having already drawn twice at Nissan Stadium earlier in the season, this was once again a tight affair with Manabu Saitō putting the Marinos ahead from the penalty spot in the 63rd minute only for Yasuyuki Konno to seemingly send the tie into extra time with an 87th-minute equaliser. Unfortunately for Gamba, Jun Amano had other ideas and his 96th-minute strike from outside the box sent them through to the semi-finals and left Gamba hoping Kashima or Kawasaki would lift the cup to ensure their progression to the 2017 Asian Champions League.

Round	Date	Opponents	H / A	Result F-A	Scorers	Attendance
4th round	9 November 2016	Shimizu S-Pulse	H	1–0 aet	Nagasawa 112'	8,789
QF	24 December 2016	Yokohama F. Marinos	A	1–2	Konno 87'	21,898

=== Match Day Line-Ups ===
The following players appeared for Gamba Osaka during the 2016 Emperor's Cup:

Player Appearances – 2016 Emperor's Cup
Round	Opponent	GK	RB	LB	CB	CB	CM	CM	RW	LW	AM	FW	Substituted on	Substituted on	Substituted on
4R	Shimizu S-Pulse	Fujigaya	Oh (substituted off)	Fujiharu	Niwa	Iwashita (substituted off)	Endō	Konno	Doan (substituted off)	Kurata	Ademilson	Goya	Abe	Nagasawa	Hatsuse
QF	Yokohama F. Marinos	Fujigaya	Oh (substituted off)	Fujiharu	Niwa	Kim (substituted off)	Ideguchi	Konno	Kurata	Fujimoto (substituted off)	Endō	Ademilson	Omori	Nagasawa	Hatsuse

(substituted on) = Substitute on, (substituted off) = Substitute Off, = Number of goals scored, = Yellow Card and = Red Card.

== Squad statistics ==
No.	Pos.	Name	League		Emperor's Cup		J.League Cup		Champions League		Super Cup		Total		Discipline	
No.	Pos.	Name	Apps	Goals	Apps	Goals	Apps	Goals	Apps	Goals	Apps	Goals	Apps	Goals	Yellow card	Red card
1	GK	(Japan) Masaaki Higashiguchi	34	0	0	0	1	0	5	0	1	0	41	0	3	0
3	DF	(Japan) Takaharu Nishino	1(2)	0	0	0	0	0	0(1)	0	0	0	1(3)	0	0	0
4	DF	(Japan) Hiroki Fujiharu	27(2)	2	2	0	5	0	5	0	1	0	40(2)	2	2	0
5	DF	(Japan) Daiki Niwa	28	0	2	0	5	1	3	0	1	0	39	1	4	0
6	DF	(South Korea) Kim Jung-ya	27(1)	3	1	0	5	0	5	0	0	0	38(1)	3	3	0
7	MF	(Japan) Yasuhito Endō (c)	33(1)	2	2	0	3	1	4(1)	1	1	0	43(2)	4	6	0
8	DF	(Japan) Keisuke Iwashita	10	1	1	0	0(1)	0	1	0	0	0	12(1)	1	5	0
9	FW	(Brazil) Ademilson	24(5)	9	2	0	3(1)	3	3(1)	1	1	0	33(7)	13	3	1
10	MF	(Japan) Takahiro Futagawa	0	0	0	0	0	0	0(1)	0	0	0	0(1)	0	0	0
11	MF	(Japan) Shu Kurata	25(9)	2	2	0	4(1)	0	3(2)	0	0(1)	0	34(13)	2	3	0
13	MF	(Japan) Hiroyuki Abe	21(3)	3	0(1)	0	2	1	3	0	1	0	27(4)	4	2	0
14	DF	(Japan) Koki Yonekura	19(2)	1	0	0	5	0	3(2)	0	0	0	27(4)	1	5	0
15	MF	(Japan) Yasuyuki Konno	30(3)	4	2	1	3	0	5	1	1	0	41(3)	6	4	0
16	GK	(Japan) Ken Tajiri	0	0	0	0	0	0	0	0	0	0	0	0	0	0
17	MF	(Japan) Kenya Okazaki	0	0	0	0	0	0	0	0	0	0	0	0	0	0
18	GK	(Japan) Yōsuke Fujigaya	0	0	2	0	4	0	1	0	0	0	7	0	0	0
19	MF	(Japan) Kotaro Omori	13(11)	3	0(1)	0	4(1)	0	2(1)	0	0	0	19(14)	3	1	0
20	FW	(Japan) Shun Nagasawa	13(8)	9	0(2)	1	1(3)	2	2(2)	0	0(1)	0	16(16)	12	6	0
21	MF	(Japan) Yosuke Ideguchi	14(8)	4	1	0	5	0	5	0	1	0	26(8)	4	7	0
22	DF	(South Korea) Oh Jae-suk	17(1)	0	2	0	0	0	4	0	1	0	24(1)	0	3	0
23	FW	(Japan) Hiroto Goya	3(11)	1	1	0	0(4)	1	0(1)	0	0	0	4(16)	2	1	1
24	FW	(Japan) Naoki Ogawa	0	0	0	0	0	0	0	0	0	0	0	0	0	0
25	MF	(Japan) Jungo Fujimoto	3(10)	0	1	0	3(2)	0	2(2)	0	0(1)	0	9(15)	0	3	0
26	MF	(Japan) Naoya Senoo	0	0	0	0	0	0	0	0	0	0	0	0	0	0
27	MF	(Japan) Tatsuya Uchida	2(1)	0	0	0	0(1)	0	1	0	0	0	3(2)	0	1	0
28	MF	(Japan) Shota Yomesaka	0	0	0	0	0	0	0	0	0	0	0	0	0	0
29	FW	(Brazil) Patric	10(10)	2	0	0	2	0	4(1)	1	1	0	17(11)	3	3	0
30	DF	(Japan) So Hirao	0	0	0	0	0	0	0	0	0	0	0	0	0	0
31	GK	(Japan) Mizuki Hayashi	0	0	0	0	0	0	0	0	0	0	0	0	0	0
32	DF	(Japan) Hiroki Noda	0	0	0	0	0	0	0	0	0	0	0	0	0	0
33	FW	(Japan) Kazunari Ichimi	0	0	0	0	0	0	0	0	0	0	0	0	0	0
35	DF	(Japan) Ryo Hatsuse	3(2)	0	0(2)	0	0	0	1	0	0	0	4(4)	0	0	0
36	MF	(Japan) Mizuki Ichimaru	0	0	0	0	0	0	0	0	0	0	0	0	0	0
37	FW	(Japan) Akito Takagi	0	0	0	0	0	0	0	0	0	0	0	0	0	0
38	MF	(Japan) Ritsu Doan	0(3)	0	1	0	0	0	0(1)	0	0	0	1(4)	0	0	0
39	FW	(Japan) Takashi Usami	15(2)	5	0	0	0	0	5	0	1	1	21(2)	6	0	0
40	MF	(Japan) Shōhei Ogura	0(2)	0	0	0	0	0	0	0	0	0	0(2)	0	0	0
—	—	Own goals	–	2	–	0	–	0	–	0	–	0	–	2	–	–

Statistics accurate as of match played on 24 December 2016.
