= 2015 Suruga Bank Championship =

Football match

- Match programme cover
- Event: Suruga Bank Championship
Gamba Osaka	River Plate
(Japan)	(Argentina)
0	3
- Date: 11 August 2015
- Venue: Expo '70 Commemorative Stadium, Suita
- Referee: Tan Hai (China)
- Attendance: 12,722
- Weather: Clear; 29.7 °C (85.5 °F); 58% humidity

The 2015 Suruga Bank Championship was a football match between Gamba Osaka of Japan and River Plate of Argentina on 11 August 2015 at the Expo '70 Commemorative Stadium, contested between the winners of the Japanese league cup, the J.League Cup and the Copa Sudamericana as the annual J.League Cup / Copa Sudamericana Championship.

The teams had qualified for the tournament by winning their two seasonal competitions. Gamba Osaka won the 2014 J.League Cup, beating Sanfrecce Hiroshima 3–2. River Plate were the 2014 Copa Sudamericana champions after winning the two-legged final 3–1 against Atlético Nacional of Colombia.

Watched by a crowd of 12,722, River Plate took an early lead in the first half when Carlos Sánchez scored through a penalty. Their lead was extended after Gabriel Mercado also found the net in the 31st minute, and they added one further in the second half after Gonzalo Martínez made it 3–0. No further goals were scored with almost a half hour to end, which consequently crowned River Plate as winners of the 2015 Suruga Bank Championship.

== Background ==
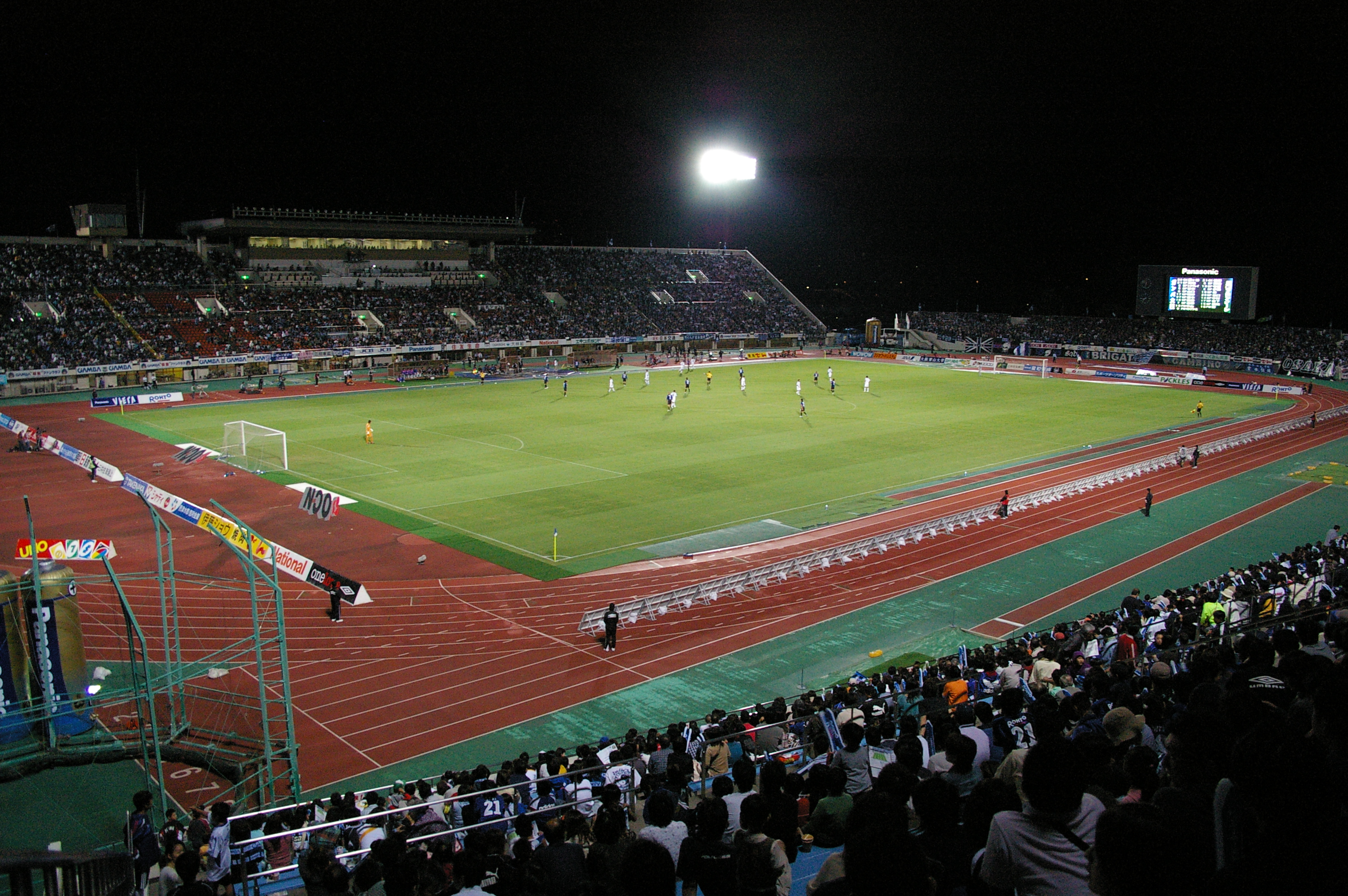
Gamba Osaka's home ground of Expo '70 Commemorative Stadium hosted the match.

The J.League Cup / Copa Sudamericana Championship, also known as the Suruga Bank Championship for sponsorship reasons, was established by the Japan Football Association and CONMEBOL, the governing bodies of football in Japan and South America respectively. The idea for the cup was pitched as a sporting agreement, with the aim of strengthening relations between the two associations through an annual competition. It had been held since 2008, hosted annually at the J.League Cup winner's home stadium.

Gamba Osaka qualified for the Suruga Bank Championship as the reigning J.League Cup champions. They had won the 2014 J.League Cup beating Sanfrecce Hiroshima 3–2 in the final. It was their second appearance in the tournament, after suffering a 1–0 loss to Arsenal de Sarandí of Argentina in the 2008 edition.

River Plate qualified for the match as winners of the 2014 Copa Sudamericana. They had beaten Colombian team Atlético Nacional 3–1 on aggregate to win their first Copa Sudamericana. They were making their first appearance in the competition, being the fourth Argentine team to play in the tournament.

Both teams were midway through their respective domestic campaigns at the time of the matches. Gamba Osaka's last game before the match was against Albirex Niigata on a 2–2 draw played on 29 July 2015. River Plate played on 5 August 2015 the second leg of the 2015 Copa Libertadores final against Tigres UANL. They won 3–0, winning their third Copa Libertadores. Despite the importance of their previous match, River Plate would take part in the Suruga Bank Championship with mostly the same squad that had lined up for the continental meeting.

== Match ==
=== Summary ===
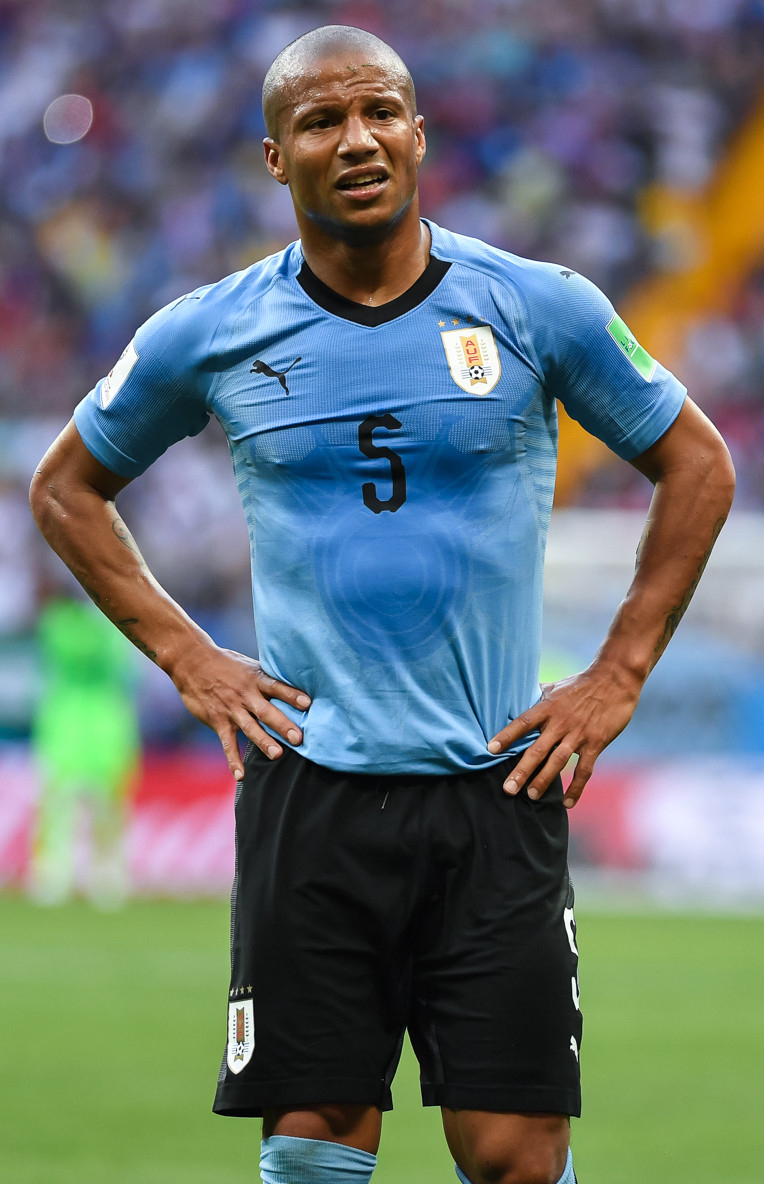
Carlos Sánchez was key in River Plate's victory, with two goal contributions.

River Plate kicked off at the Expo '70 Commemorative Stadium. They opened the scoring to the match early in the eighth minute, when a foul committed by Yosuke Ideguchi on Nicolás Bertolo inside the area resulted in a penalty. Uruguayan midfielder Carlos Sánchez took care of the spot kick, unleashing a strong, high shot to put his team ahead. River Plate would experience a scare around the 20th minute, when goalkeeper Marcelo Barovero misjudged a bounce that went over his head. The clearance fell to Gamba Osaka's Patric, but the striker hesitated, allowing Barovero to fend off the equaliser. A half hour into the game, Sánchez sent a corner kick over to Gabriel Mercado, who headed the ball over goalkeeper Yosuke Fujigaya to extend their lead. During the remainder of the half, the River Plate midfielder continued to create chances for his side. He first came close to adding one further at the 36-minute mark. Minutes later, a combination along with Leonel Vangioni yielded his team another scoring prospect, which Sebastián Driussi was unable to capitalize upon. Lastly, Sánchez sent a volley into the crossbar in stoppage time.

Gamba Osaka kicked off the second half. Shortly after the restart, they had their first chance to pull one back following a run from Lins. His follow up shot, however, went wide of the near post. In the 52nd minute, River Plate manager Marcelo Gallardo subbed in three players, two of them being Gonzalo Martínez and Leonardo Pisculichi. The changes paid off nine minutes later, when Pisculichi started a play in the midfield. He then linked up with Mercado, who followed up with Martínez on his right. The attacking midfielder controlled the ball, and curled a left-footed shot into the far corner of the net, beating goalkeeper Fujigaya to make it 3–0. Following the goal, Gamba Osaka would get ahold of possession, as they looked to shorten the deficit. An opportunity arose for them through Patric, but defender Ramiro Funes Mori exerted himself to divert the ball when the Brazilian striker was about to score. From the subsequent corner, Patric missed a header at close range. Barovero later made three crucial saves, denying efforts from Shingo Akamine and Shu Kurata. During this time, River Plate were being outplayed on both flanks, and were leaving gaps for the home side to take advantage of, as fatigue and physical exhaustion started to take their toll. Kurata had one last chance for Gamba Osaka, but he put shot went wide, and the score remained.

=== Details ===
August 11, 2015
19:00 JST

Gamba Osaka (Japan)	0–3	(Argentina) River Plate
	Report	Sánchez 8' (pen.); Mercado 31'; Martínez 61'

Expo '70 Commemorative Stadium, Suita
Attendance: 12,722
Referee: Tan Hai (China)

Gamba Osaka	River Plate

GK	18	(Japan) Yōsuke Fujigaya
DF	6	(South Korea) Kim Jung-ya		(substituted off) 41'
DF	8	(Japan) Keisuke Iwashita	(yellow card) 44'
DF	15	(Japan) Yasuyuki Konno
DF	22	(South Korea) Oh Jae-suk		(substituted off) 83'
MF	7	(Japan) Yasuhito Endō (c)
MF	17	(Japan) Tomokazu Myojin		(substituted off) 46'
MF	19	(Japan) Kotaro Omori		(substituted off) 55'
MF	21	(Japan) Yosuke Ideguchi
FW	9	(Brazil) Lins		(substituted off) 64'
FW	29	(Brazil) Patric		(substituted off) 71'
Substitutes:
GK	16	(Japan) Ken Tajiri
DF	3	(Japan) Takaharu Nishino
DF	4	(Japan) Hiroki Fujiharu		(substituted on) 46'
MF	10	(Japan) Takahiro Futagawa		(substituted on) 55'
MF	11	(Japan) Shu Kurata	(yellow card) 57'	(substituted on) 41'
MF	13	(Japan) Hiroyuki Abe		(substituted on) 64'
FW	20	(Japan) Shun Nagasawa
FW	24	(Japan) Shingo Akamine		(substituted on) 71'
FW	30	(Japan) So Hirao		(substituted on) 83'
Manager:
(Japan) Kenta Hasegawa

GK	1	(Argentina) Marcelo Barovero (c)
DF	25	(Argentina) Gabriel Mercado
DF	2	(Argentina) Jonatan Maidana
DF	6	(Argentina) Ramiro Funes Mori
DF	21	(Argentina) Leonel Vangioni
MF	8	(Uruguay) Carlos Sánchez	(substituted off) 78'
MF	23	(Argentina) Leonardo Ponzio	(substituted off) 52'
MF	5	(Argentina) Matías Kranevitter
MF	16	(Argentina) Nicolás Bertolo	(substituted off) 52'
FW	22	(Argentina) Sebastián Driussi	(substituted off) 52'
FW	29	(Argentina) Javier Saviola	(substituted off) 64'
Substitutes:
GK	26	(Argentina) Julio Chiarini
DF	3	(Colombia) Éder Álvarez Balanta
MF	18	(Uruguay) Camilo Mayada	(substituted on) 78'
MF	14	(Argentina) Augusto Solari
MF	15	(Argentina) Leonardo Pisculichi	(substituted on) 52'
MF	27	(Argentina) Lucho González	(substituted on) 64'
MF	10	(Argentina) Gonzalo Martínez	(substituted on) 52'
FW	17	(Argentina) Lucas Boyé
FW	19	(Uruguay) Tabaré Viudez	(substituted on) 52'
Manager:
(Argentina) Marcelo Gallardo

Assistant referees
Mu Yuxin (China)
Huo Weiming (China)
Fourth official
Hiroyuki Kimura (Japan)

Match rules

- 90 minutes
- No extra-time
- Penalty shoot-out if necessary
- Nine named substitutes, of which up to six may be used

== Post-match ==
River Plate's squad had travelled to San Nicolás de los Garza, Mexico on 29 July for the first leg of the Copa Libertadores final, then back to Buenos Aires for the rematch, and eventually boarded their flight to Osaka for the eighth edition of the Suruga Bank Championship just 24 hours later. Coach Marcelo Gallardo addressed the packed schedule after the game, highlighting: "We're happy to win another title [...] There was a risk because we were not in prime condition after traveling so far, and this match was a very important challenge. We responded once again." Regarding of the importance of the tournament, he stated: "Only two South American teams have had the opportunity to win this cup in eight editions."

Kenta Hasegawa was disappointed about the defeat. He argued: "We played our typical Gamba style and had some chances but we came up short [...] If we'd scored a goal in the second half when the heat slowed the opponents down, we could have added a few more goals. We didn't know if the opponents would come aggressively or defensively at us early on, but unless we can play well even under that level of pressure, we won't be the real deal."

It was the fourth international title River Plate had lifted in 245 days, breaking the record set by Estudiantes de La Plata between 1968 and 1969, who had managed the same in just over a year. Gallardo commented on the feat: "A sense of aura is being built up, and that’s achieved by solidifying a winning team." He added further: "Getting used to winning is the best – we can't deviate from that path."

== See also ==
- 2015 J.League Cup
- 2015 Copa Sudamericana
- 2015 Gamba Osaka season
- 2015 Club Atlético River Plate season
