= 2015 Gamba Osaka season =

Gamba Osaka
2015 season
- Chairman: Teruhisa Noro
- Manager: Kenta Hasegawa
- J1 League: 3rd (regular season); Runner-up (Championship)
- Emperor's Cup: Winners
- J.League Cup: Runner-up
- AFC Champions League: Semi-finals
- Japanese Super Cup: Winners
- Suruga Bank Championship: Runner-up
- Top goalscorer: League: Takashi Usami 19; All: Takashi Usami 28
- Highest home attendance: 18,842 vs Kawasaki Frontale, 16 May 2015 (J1 League)
- Lowest home attendance: 6,064 vs Nagoya Grampus, 2 September 2015 (J.League Cup)
- Average home league attendance: 15,999 (league); 13,927 (season)
Home colours	Away colours	Third colours

The 2015 Gamba Osaka season was Gamba Osaka's 22nd season in the J.League Division 1 and 28th overall in the Japanese top flight. It also includes the 2015 J.League Cup, 2015 Emperor's Cup, 2015 AFC Champions League, 2015 Japanese Super Cup and the 2015 Suruga Bank Championship.

== Transfers ==
=== In ===
No.	Pos	Player	Transferred from	Fee	Date	Source
24	FW	(Japan) Shingo Akamine	(Japan) Vegalta Sendai	Unknown	Dec 2014	
18	GK	(Japan) Yōsuke Fujigaya	(Japan) Júbilo Iwata	Free transfer	Jan 2015	
33	MF	(Japan) Shōhei Ogura	(Japan) Yokohama F. Marinos	Unknown	Dec 2014	
20	FW	(Japan) Shun Nagasawa	(Japan) Shimizu S-Pulse	Unknown	9 Jul 2015	

=== Out ===
Pos	Player	Transferred to	Fee	Date	Source
FW	(Japan) Shota Kawanishi	(Japan) Montedio Yamagata	Unknown	Dec 2014	
GK	(Japan) Kohei Kawata	(Japan) Ventforet Kofu	Unknown	Dec 2014	
GK	(Japan) Atsushi Kimura	retired	Unknown	Dec 2014	
FW	(Japan) Naoki Ogawa	(Japan) Fujieda MYFC	Loan	Dec 2014	
MF	(Japan) Kenya Okazaki	(Japan) Ehime FC	Loan	Dec 2014	
FW	(Japan) Akihiro Sato	(Japan) Tokushima Vortis	Unknown	Dec 2014	
DF	(Japan) Yuto Uchida	(Japan) Tokushima Vortis	Loan	Dec 2014	
MF	(Japan) Shōhei Ogura	(Japan) Montedio Yamagata	Loan	Aug 2015	

== First team squad ==
As of the beginning of 2015 season.

Squad no.	Name	Nationality	Position(s)	Since	Date of birth (age)	Signed from	Games played	Goals scored
Goalkeepers
1	Masaaki Higashiguchi	(Japan)	GK	2014	12 May 1986 (aged 29)	Albirex Niigata	50	0
16	Ken Tajiri	(Japan)	GK	2013	11 June 1993 (aged 22)	Gamba Osaka Youth	0	0
18	Yōsuke Fujigaya	(Japan)	GK	2015	13 February 1981 (aged 34)	Júbilo Iwata	336	0
31	Mizuki Hayashi	(Japan)	GK	2015	4 September 1996 (aged 19)	Gamba Osaka Youth	0	0
Defenders
3	Takaharu Nishino	(Japan)	CB	2012	14 September 1993 (aged 22)	Gamba Osaka Youth	54	6
4	Hiroki Fujiharu	(Japan)	LB	2011	28 November 1988 (aged 27)	Osaka University of H&SS	145	6
5	Daiki Niwa	(Japan)	CB	2012	16 January 1986 (aged 29)	Avispa Fukuoka	82	6
6	Kim Jung-ya	(South Korea)	CB	2014	17 May 1988 (aged 27)	Sagan Tosu	31	0
8	Keisuke Iwashita	(Japan)	CB	2012	24 September 1986 (aged 29)	Shimizu S-Pulse	77	4
14	Koki Yonekura	(Japan)	RB / RM	2014	17 May 1988 (aged 27)	JEF United	35	3
22	Oh Jae-suk	(South Korea)	RB / LB	2013	4 January 1990 (aged 25)	(South Korea) Gangwon FC	42	0
30	So Hirao	(Japan)	RB	2015	1 July 1996 (aged 19)	Gamba Osaka Youth	0	0
35	Ryo Hatsuse	(Japan)	CB	2015	10 July 1997 (aged 18)	Gamba Osaka Youth	0	0
Midfielders
7	Yasuhito Endō (captain)	(Japan)	CM / AM	2001	28 January 1980 (aged 35)	Kyoto Purple Sanga	556	112
10	Takahiro Futagawa	(Japan)	RM / LM	1999	27 June 1980 (aged 35)	Gamba Osaka Youth	587	86
11	Shu Kurata	(Japan)	LW / AM	2012	26 November 1988 (aged 27)	Cerezo Osaka	149	28
13	Hiroyuki Abe	(Japan)	RM	2012	5 July 1989 (aged 26)	Kwansei Gakuin University	96	18
15	Yasuyuki Konno	(Japan)	CB / DM / CM	2012	25 January 1983 (aged 32)	FC Tokyo	122	8
17	Tomokazu Myojin	(Japan)	DM / CM	2006	24 January 1978 (aged 37)	Kashiwa Reysol	338	19
19	Kotaro Omori	(Japan)	RW / LW	2011	28 April 1992 (aged 23)	Gamba Osaka Youth	63	8
21	Yōsuke Ideguchi	(Japan)	DM / CM	2014	23 August 1996 (aged 19)	Gamba Osaka Youth	2	0
26	Naoya Senoo	(Japan)	CM	2015	15 August 1996 (aged 19)	Gamba Osaka Youth	0	0
27	Tatsuya Uchida	(Japan)	DM / CM	2011	8 February 1992 (aged 23)	Gamba Osaka Youth	68	1
28	Shota Yomesaka	(Japan)	CM	2014	19 October 1996 (aged 19)	Gamba Osaka Youth	0	0
33	Shōhei Ogura	(Japan)	RB / DM / CM	2015	8 September 1985 (aged 30)	Yokohama F. Marinos	0	0
38	Ritsu Doan	(Japan)	RM	2015	16 June 1998 (aged 17)	Gamba Osaka Youth	0	0
Strikers
9	Lins	(Brazil)	CF	2014	11 September 1987 (aged 28)	(Brazil) Criciúma	39	8
20	Shun Nagasawa	(Japan)	CF	2015	25 August 1988 (aged 27)	Shimizu S-Pulse	0	0
24	Shingo Akamine	(Japan)	CF	2015	8 December 1983 (aged 32)	Vegalta Sendai	0	0
29	Patric	(Brazil)	CF	2014	26 October 1987 (aged 28)	(Brazil) Atlético Goianiense	27	16
39	Takashi Usami	(Japan)	CF / AM	2013	6 May 1992 (aged 23)	(Germany) Hoffenheim	118	59

== Pre-season friendlies ==
Date	Opponents	H / A	Result F-A	Scorers	Attendance
24 January 2015	Persija	A	4–0	Usami 35'; Lins 56', 72'; Patric 86'	

== Japanese Super Cup ==
Gamba started their domestic season on 28 February 2015 with a 2–0 victory over the 2014 J.League runners-up, the Urawa Red Diamonds in Yokohama. Both Gamba's goals came in the second half and were scored by Takashi Usami and Patric.

Round	Date	Opponents	H / A	Result F-A	Scorers	Attendance
Final	28 February 2015	Urawa Red Diamonds	N	2–0	Usami 68'; Patric 90+3'	47,666

== J.League 1 ==
Starting from the 2015 season, it was announced that the J.League would again change back to a two-stage "mini-league" (last held in 2004). The winners of each stage and top three clubs of the aggregate table subsequently qualify for the Championship.

=== First stage ===
Pos	Team	Pld	W	D	L	GF	GA	GD	Pts
3	Sanfrecce Hiroshima	17	10	4	3	29	16	+13	34
4	Gamba Osaka	17	9	5	3	24	13	+11	32
5	Kawasaki Frontale	17	9	3	5	32	26	+6	30

Updated to match(es) played on 27 June 2015. Source: Meiji Yasuda J1 League Standings
Rules for classification: 1) Points; 2) Goal difference; 3) Goals scored

Round	Date	Opponents	H / A	Result F–A	Scorers	Attendance	League position
1	7 March 2015	FC Tokyo	H	2–2	Patric 45'+1, Usami (pen.) 52'	18,332	10th
2	14 March 2015	Sagan Tosu	A	0–1		17,695	13th
3	22 March 2015	Ventforet Kofu	A	2–0	Abe 62', Usami 64'	13,047	9th
4	3 April 2015	Nagoya Grampus	H	3–1	Usami 45'+1, 49' Konno 80'	10,702	5th
5	12 April 2015	Shimizu S-Pulse	A	3–2	Usami 30', 80', Patric 51'	16,027	3rd
6	18 April 2015	Shonan Bellmare	A	2–0	Usami 26', Endō (pen.) 90'	14,538	2nd
7	26 April 2015	Albirex Niigata	H	2–1	Usami 48', Patric 84'	17,417	2nd
8	29 April 2015	Matsumoto Yamaga	H	1–0	Usami 16'	17,173	2nd
9	2 May 2015	Urawa Red Diamonds	A	0–1		53,148	3rd
10	10 May 2015	Sanfrecce Hiroshima	A	1–0	Lins 60'	17,372	3rd
11	16 May 2015	Kawasaki Frontale	H	1–1	Usami 43'	18,842	2nd
12	30 May 2015	Yokohama F. Marinos	A	1–1	Patric 90+5'	35,044	4th
13	3 June 2015	Kashima Antlers	H	2–0	Konno 41', Endō (pen.) 52'	13,110	2nd
14	7 June 2015	Vissel Kobe	H	0–0		18,437	4th
15	20 June 2015	Vegalta Sendai	H	1–1	Konno 33'	14,616	4th
16	23 June 2015	Kashiwa Reysol	A	0–1		9,997	4th
17	27 June 2015	Montedio Yamagata	A	3–1	Usami 50', 59', 62'	14,320	4th

==== Match day line-ups ====
The following players appeared for Gamba Osaka during the 2015 J.League 1 First Stage:

Player appearances – 2015 J1 League First Stage
Round	Opponent	GK	RB	LB	CB	CB	RM	LM	CM	CM	FW	FW	Substituted on	Substituted on	Substituted on
1	FC Tokyo	Higashiguchi	Oh	Fujiharu	Niwa	Iwashita	Omori (substituted off)	Kurata	Endō	Myojin	Patric	Usami (substituted off)	Lins	Yonekura	
2	Sagan Tosu	Higashiguchi	Oh (substituted off)	Fujiharu	Niwa	Iwashita	Omori (substituted off)	Kurata (substituted off)	Endō	Myojin	Patric	Usami	Lins	Abe	Yonekura
3	Ventforet Kofu	Higashiguchi	Yonekura	Fujiharu	Niwa	Iwashita	Abe	Omori (substituted off)	Endō	Myojin (substituted off)	Patric (substituted off)	Usami	Kurata	Konno	Akamine
4	Nagoya Grampus	Higashiguchi	Yonekura	Fujiharu	Niwa	Iwashita	Abe (substituted off)	Kurata (substituted off)	Endō	Konno	Patric	Usami (substituted off)	Lins	Omori	Ogura
5	Shimizu S-Pulse	Higashiguchi	Yonekura	Fujiharu	Niwa	Iwashita	Abe (substituted off)	Kurata (substituted off)	Endō	Konno	Patric	Usami	Futagawa	Omori	
6	Shonan Bellmare	Higashiguchi	Yonekura	Fujiharu	Niwa	Kim	Abe (substituted off)	Omori	Endō	Konno	Patric (substituted off)	Usami (substituted off)	Kurata	Akamine	Ogura
7	Albirex Niigata	Higashiguchi	Oh (substituted off)	Fujiharu	Niwa	Iwashita	Abe (substituted off)	Kurata	Endō	Konno	Lins (substituted off)	Usami	Yonekura	Omori	Patric
8	Matsumoto Yamaga	Higashiguchi	Yonekura (substituted off)	Fujiharu	Niwa	Kim	Abe	Omori	Endō	Ideguchi (substituted off)	Patric	Usami (substituted off)	Lins	Konno	Ogura
9	Urawa Red Diamonds	Higashiguchi	Ogura (substituted off)	Fujiharu	Niwa	Kim	Omori (substituted off)	Kurata	Endō	Konno	Patric (substituted off)	Usami	Lins	Abe	Akamine
10	Sanfrecce Hiroshima	Higashiguchi	Niwa	Fujiharu	Kim	Iwashita	Abe (substituted off)	Omori	Endō	Konno	Lins (substituted off)	Usami (substituted off)	Kurata	Patric	Ogura
11	Kawasaki Frontale	Higashiguchi	Yonekura	Fujiharu	Niwa	Iwashita	Abe (substituted off)	Omori	Endō	Konno	Patric (substituted off)	Usami (substituted off)	Lins	Kurata	Akamine
12	Yokohama F. Marinos	Higashiguchi	Yonekura	Fujiharu	Niwa	Kim	Omori (substituted off)	Kurata (substituted off)	Endō	Myojin (substituted off)	Lins	Usami	Abe	Patric	Ogura
13	Kashima Antlers	Higashiguchi	Yonekura	Fujiharu	Niwa	Iwashita	Abe	Kurata (substituted off)	Endō	Konno	Patric	Usami	Doan		
14	Vissel Kobe	Higashiguchi	Yonekura	Fujiharu	Niwa	Iwashita	Abe (substituted off)	Kurata (substituted off)	Endō	Konno	Patric (substituted off)	Usami	Lins	Omori	Akamine
15	Vegalta Sendai	Higashiguchi	Yonekura	Fujiharu	Niwa	Iwashita	Doan (substituted off)	Omori (substituted off)	Endō	Konno	Patric (substituted off)	Usami	Lins	Abe	Akamine
16	Kashiwa Reysol	Higashiguchi	Yonekura	Fujiharu	Niwa	Iwashita	Omori (substituted off)	Kurata (substituted off)	Endō	Konno	Patric (substituted off)	Usami	Lins	Abe	Akamine
17	Montedio Yamagata	Higashiguchi	Yonekura	Fujiharu	Niwa	Iwashita	Abe (substituted off)	Kurata	Endō (substituted off)	Konno	Patric (substituted off)	Usami	Kim	Myojin	Omori

(substituted on) = Substitute on, (substituted off) = Substitute Off, = Number of goals scored, = Yellow Card and = Red Card.

=== Second stage ===
Pos	Team	Pld	W	D	L	GF	GA	GD	Pts
2	Kashima Antlers	17	12	1	4	30	16	+14	37
3	Gamba Osaka	17	9	4	4	32	24	+8	31
4	Urawa Red Diamonds	17	9	4	4	30	23	+7	31

Updated to match(es) played on 22 November 2015. Source: Meiji Yasuda J1 League 2nd Stage Standings
Rules for classification: 1) Points; 2) Goal difference; 3) Goals scored

Round	Date	Opponents	H / A	Result F–A	Scorers	Attendance	League position
18	11 July 2015	Ventforet Kofu	H	2–1	Patric 34', Usami (pen.) 90'	14,364	6th
19	15 July 2015	Nagoya Grampus	A	2–3	Omori 8', Patric 30'	13,422	8th
20	19 July 2015	Yokohama F. Marinos	H	2–2	Patric 5', Usami 68'	16,787	7th
21	22 July 2015	Sagan Tosu	H	1–1	Endō (pen.) 39'	11,156	4th
22	25 July 2015	Vissel Kobe	A	2–1	Endō 12', Usami 77'	20,679	3rd
23	29 July 2015	Albirex Niigata	A	2–2	Yonekura 47', Endō (pen.) 54'	19,650	5th
24	16 August 2015	FC Tokyo	A	1–2	Patric 47'	37,978	10th
25	22 August 2015	Shimizu S-Pulse	H	1–0	Patric 31'	15,333	8th
26	30 August 2015	Shonan Bellmare	H	1–0	Kurata 9'	14,985	5th
27	12 September 2015	Kashima Antlers	A	2–1	Usami (pen.) 29', 39'	22,380	5th
28	20 September 2015	Matsumoto Yamaga	A	1–1	Kurata (pen.) 90+3'	18,052	5th
29	26 September 2015	Kashiwa Reysol	H	3–1	Abe 34', 37', Usami 60'	16,438	4th
30	4 October 2015	Kawasaki Frontale	A	3–5	Patric 42', 66', Kurata 71'	24,300	8th
31	17 October 2015	Urawa Red Diamonds	H	2–1	Abe 7', Nagasawa 59'	18,638	4th
32	25 October 2015	Vegalta Sendai	A	3–1	Patric 21' Kurata 36', 62'	19,263	4th
33	7 November 2015	Sanfrecce Hiroshima	H	0–2		17,435	4th
34	22 November 2015	Montedio Yamagata	H	4–0	Omori 61', 63', Nagasawa 64', Yonekura 66'	18,219	3rd

==== Match day line-ups ====
The following players appeared for Gamba Osaka during the 2015 J.League 1 Second stage:

Player appearances – 2015 J1 League Second stage
	Opponent	GK	RB	LB	CB	CB	RM	LM	CM	CM	FW	FW	Substituted on	Substituted on	Substituted on
18	Ventforet Kofu	Higashiguchi	Yonekura	Fujiharu	Niwa	Iwashita	Abe (substituted off)	Kurata (substituted off)	Endō (substituted off)	Konno	Patric	Usami	Lins	Omori	Akamine
19	Nagoya Grampus	Higashiguchi	Yonekura	Fujiharu	Niwa	Iwashita	Omori (substituted off)	Kurata (substituted off)	Endō	Konno	Patric	Usami (substituted off)	Lins	Abe	Nagasawa
20	Yokohama F. Marinos	Higashiguchi	Oh (substituted off)	Fujiharu	Niwa	Iwashita	Omori (substituted off)	Kurata	Endō	Konno	Patric (substituted off)	Usami	Abe	Yonekura	Nagasawa
21	Sagan Tosu	Higashiguchi	Yonekura	Oh (substituted off)	Niwa	Kim	Abe	Kurata	Endō (substituted off)	Myojin (substituted off)	Patric	Usami	Fujiharu	Lins	Konno
22	Vissel Kobe	Higashiguchi	Yonekura	Fujiharu	Niwa	Iwashita	Abe (substituted off)	Omori	Endō	Konno	Lins (substituted off)	Usami (substituted off)	Kurata	Myojin	Patric
23	Albirex Niigata	Higashiguchi	Yonekura (substituted off)	Fujiharu	Niwa	Iwashita	Abe (substituted off)	Kurata (substituted off)	Endō	Konno	Patric	Usami	Myojin	Omori	Oh
24	FC Tokyo	Higashiguchi	Yonekura	Fujiharu	Niwa	Iwashita	Abe (substituted off)	Kurata (substituted off)	Endō	Konno	Patric (substituted off)	Usami	Lins	Omori	Akamine
25	Shimizu S-Pulse	Higashiguchi	Yonekura	Fujiharu	Niwa	Kim	Omori (substituted off)	Kurata (substituted off)	Endō	Konno	Patric	Usami (substituted off)	Lins	Abe	Ideguchi
26	Shonan Bellmare	Higashiguchi	Yonekura	Fujiharu	Niwa	Iwashita	Omori (substituted off)	Kurata (substituted off)	Endō	Konno	Patric (substituted off)	Usami	Kim	Abe	Ideguchi
27	Kashima Antlers	Higashiguchi	Yonekura (substituted off)	Fujiharu	Niwa	Iwashita	Abe (substituted off)	Kurata	Endō	Konno	Patric (substituted off)	Usami	Kim	Lins	Ideguchi
28	Matsumoto Yamaga	Higashiguchi	Yonekura	Fujiharu	Niwa	Kim	Abe (substituted off)	Endō	Ideguchi (substituted off)	Konno	Akamine (substituted off)	Usami	Kurata	Omori	Patric
29	Kashiwa Reysol	Higashiguchi	Yonekura	Oh	Niwa	Iwashita	Abe	Kurata (substituted off)	Endō	Konno	Patric (substituted off)	Usami (substituted off)	Myojin	Omori	Akamine
30	Kawasaki Frontale	Higashiguchi	Yonekura	Oh (substituted off)	Niwa	Iwashita	Abe (substituted off)	Omori (substituted off)	Endō	Konno	Patric	Usami	Lins	Kurata	Myojin
31	Urawa Red Diamonds	Higashiguchi	Oh	Fujiharu	Niwa	Nishino	Abe (substituted off)	Endō	Ideguchi	Konno	Akamine (substituted off)	Usami (substituted off)	Kim	Omori	Nagasawa
32	Vegalta Sendai	Higashiguchi	Yonekura	Fujiharu	Niwa	Nishino (substituted off)	Abe	Kurata (substituted off)	Endō	Konno	Patric (substituted off)	Usami	Kim	Ideguchi	Akamine
33	Sanfrecce Hiroshima	Higashiguchi (substituted off)	Yonekura	Fujiharu	Niwa	Iwashita (substituted off)	Endō	Kurata	Ideguchi (substituted off)	Konno	Patric	Usami	Abe	Fujigaya	Omori
34	Montedio Yamagata	Higashiguchi	Oh (substituted off)	Fujiharu	Niwa	Nishino	Abe (substituted off)	Omori	Endō	Konno	Kurata (substituted off)	Usami	Futagawa	Yonekura	Nagasawa

(substituted on) = Substitute on, (substituted off) = Substitute Off, = Number of goals scored, = Yellow Card and = Red Card.

=== Overall standings ===
Pos	Team	Pld	W	D	L	GF	GA	GD	Pts	Qualification or relegation
1	Sanfrecce Hiroshima (C)	34	23	5	6	73	30	+43	74	Club World Cup, Champions League group stage and J.League Championship Final
2	Urawa Red Diamonds	34	21	9	4	69	40	+29	72	Champions League group stage and J.League Championship 1st Round
3	Gamba Osaka	34	18	9	7	56	37	+19	63	Champions League group stage and J.League Championship 1st Round
4	FC Tokyo	34	19	6	9	45	33	+12	63	Champions League qualifying play-off (Note: The winner of the 2015 Emperor's Cup qualified for the Group Stage of the 2016 AFC Champions League. Since the Emperor's Cup winner was Gamba Osaka who were the third-placed team, the qualifying play-off spot was awarded to the fourth-placed team.)
5	Kashima Antlers	34	18	5	11	57	41	+16	59	

Updated to match(es) played on 28 November 2015. Source: Meiji Yasuda J1 League Standings
Rules for classification: 1) Points; 2) Goal difference; 3) Goals scored
(C) Champions

=== Championship stage ===
Gamba's 3rd-place finish in the overall standings for J.League 1 in 2015 saw them paired against the Urawa Red Diamonds at the semi-final stage. Due to Urawa's higher placing, the match was played at Saitama Stadium 2002, Urawa's home ground. A 3–1 win after extra-time set up a two-legged final against Sanfrecce Hiroshima.

Round	Date	Opponents	H / A	Result F-A	Scorers	Attendance
Semi-Final	28 November 2015	Urawa Red Diamonds	A	3–1 aet	Konno 47', Fujiharu 118', Patric 120+1'	40,696
Final	2 December 2015	Sanfrecce Hiroshima	H	2–3	Nagasawa 60', Konno 82'	17,844
Final	5 December 2015	Sanfrecce Hiroshima	A	1–1	Konno 27'	36,609

==== Match day line-ups ====
The following players appeared for Gamba Osaka during the J.League 1 Championship Stage:

Player appearances – 2015 J1 League
Round	Opponent	GK	RB	LB	CB	CB	RM	LM	CM	CM	FW	FW	Substituted on	Substituted on	Substituted on
SF	Urawa Red Diamonds	Higashiguchi	Oh	Fujiharu	Niwa	Nishino	Abe (substituted off)	Omori (substituted off)	Endō	Konno	Patric	Usami (substituted off)	Kurata	Yonekura	Ideguchi
F	Sanfrecce Hiroshima	Higashiguchi	Oh	Fujiharu	Niwa	Nishino	Abe (substituted off)	Omori (substituted off)	Endō	Konno	Nagasawa	Usami (substituted off)	Kurata	Yonekura	Patric
F	Sanfrecce Hiroshima	Higashiguchi	Yonekura	Fujiharu	Niwa	Nishino (substituted off)	Abe	Omori (substituted off)	Endō	Konno	Nagasawa (substituted off)	Usami	Kurata	Ideguchi	Patric

(substituted on) = Substitute on, (substituted off) = Substitute Off, = Number of goals scored, = Yellow Card and = Red Card.

== AFC Champions League ==
As 2014 J.League Division 1 champions, Gamba qualified for the 2015 AFC Champions League. This was their 7th appearance in the competition and their first since 2012. They were drawn into Group F along with Buriram United of Thailand, Guangzhou R&F of China and Seongnam of South Korea. Gamba finished top of the group and along with Seongnam qualified for the Round of 16. As Group F winners they were paired against the runner-up of Group H who were FC Seoul. Gamba defeated Seoul 6–3 on aggregate and were paired with yet another Korean side, Jeonbuk Hyundai Motors in the quarter-finals. Following a scoreless draw in the first leg in Korea, Gamba sealed a dramatic 3–2 victory at home, with defender Koki Yonekura netting the winner in the 93rd minute to ensure their progression to the semi-finals where they were paired with Chinese side Guangzhou Evergrande. A 2–1 defeat in China followed by 0–0 draw at home saw Gamba fall at the semi-final stage.

Round	Date	Opponents	H / A	Result F–A	Scorers	Attendance	League position
1	24 February 2015	Guangzhou R&F	H	0–2		8,848	4th
2	3 March 2015	Seongnam	A	0–2		7,813	4th
3	18 March 2015	Buriram United	H	1–1	Abe 39'	6,469	4th
4	7 April 2015	Buriram United	A	2–1	Lins 40', Omori 87'	23,987	4th
5	22 April 2015	Guangzhou R&F	A	5–0	Patric 14', 45', Abe 43', 68', Usami 70'	8,647	2nd
6	6 May 2015	Seongnam	H	2–1	Usami 64', Lins 82'	12,821	1st
1/16	20 May 2015	FC Seoul	A	3–1	Usami 62', 86', Yonekura 73'	10,607	N/A
1/16	27 May 2015	FC Seoul	H	3–2	Patric 16', Kurata 45', Lins 86'	9,597	N/A
QF	26 August 2015	Jeonbuk Hyundai Motors	A	0–0		23,633	N/A
QF	16 September 2015	Jeonbuk Hyundai Motors	H	3–2	Patric 14', Kurata 76', Yonekura 90+3'	9,284	N/A
SF	30 September 2015	Guangzhou Evergrande	A	1–2	Feng 12' (o.g.)	48,946	N/A
SF	21 October 2015	Guangzhou Evergrande	H	0–0		17,310	N/A

=== Match day line-ups ===
The following players appeared for Gamba Osaka during the 2015 AFC Champions League:

Player appearances – 2015 AFC Champions League
Round	Opponent	GK	RB	LB	CB	CB	RM	LM	CM	CM	FW	FW	Substituted on	Substituted on	Substituted on
1	Guangzhou R&F	Higashiguchi	Yonekura	Fujiharu	Niwa	Iwashita	Abe (substituted off)	Omori (substituted off)	Endō	Ogura (substituted off)	Patric	Usami	Lins	Kurata	Akamine
2	Seongnam	Higashiguchi	Yonekura (substituted off)	Oh	Niwa	Kim	Abe (substituted off)	Kurata	Endō	Ogura (substituted off)	Patric	Lins	Fujiharu	Myojin	Usami
3	Buriram United	Higashiguchi	Yonekura	Oh (substituted off)	Niwa	Iwashita	Abe	Omori (substituted off)	Endō	Myojin	Patric	Usami (substituted off)	Fujiharu	Lins	Akamine
4	Buriram United	Higashiguchi	Yonekura	Fujiharu	Niwa	Nishino (substituted off)	Abe (substituted off)	Kurata (substituted off)	Endō	Konno	Lins	Usami	Kim	Omori	Akamine
5	Guangzhou R&F	Higashiguchi	Yonekura	Fujiharu	Niwa	Iwashita	Abe (substituted off)	Omori	Endō (substituted off)	Konno	Patric (substituted off)	Usami	Lins	Kurata	Ogura
6	Seongnam	Higashiguchi	Ogura (substituted off)	Fujiharu (substituted off)	Niwa	Kim	Abe	Futagawa (substituted off)	Endō	Konno	Patric	Usami	Iwashita	Lins	Kurata
1/16	FC Seoul	Higashiguchi	Yonekura	Fujiharu	Niwa	Iwashita	Abe (substituted off)	Omori (substituted off)	Endō	Konno	Patric	Usami	Kurata	Futagawa	
1/16	FC Seoul	Higashiguchi	Yonekura (substituted off)	Fujiharu	Niwa	Iwashita	Abe (substituted off)	Kurata	Endō	Konno	Patric	Usami (substituted off)	Kim	Lins	Doan
QF	Jeonbuk Hyundai Motors	Higashiguchi	Niwa	Fujiharu	Kim	Iwashita	Abe (substituted off)	Omori (substituted off)	Endō	Myojin	Patric	Usami (substituted off)	Lins	Kurata	Ideguchi
QF	Jeonbuk Hyundai Motors	Higashiguchi	Oh (substituted off)	Fujiharu	Niwa	Iwashita	Abe (substituted off)	Futagawa (substituted off)	Endō	Konno	Patric	Kurata	Kim	Lins	Yonekura
SF	Guangzhou Evergrande	Higashiguchi	Yonekura	Oh	Niwa	Kim	Abe (substituted off)	Kurata (substituted off)	Endō	Konno	Patric	Usami (substituted off)	Lins	Myojin	Akamine
SF	Guangzhou Evergrande	Higashiguchi	Yonekura	Fujiharu	Niwa	Iwashita	Abe (substituted off)	Futagawa (substituted off)	Endō	Konno	Patric	Kurata (substituted off)	Omori	Nagasawa	Usami

(substituted on) = Substitute on, (substituted off) = Substitute Off, = Number of goals scored, = Yellow Card and = Red Card.

== Suruga Bank Championship ==
The Suruga Bank Championship sees the winners of the previous season's J.League Cup and Copa Sudamerica face off in a one-off match. This saw Gamba take on Argentine giants River Plate. A 3–0 defeat at Osaka Expo '70 Stadium saw Gamba finish as runners-up.

Round	Date	Opponents	H / A	Result F-A	Scorers	Attendance
Final	11 August 2015	River Plate	H	0–3		12,722

== J.League Cup ==
As a result of their qualification for the AFC Champions League, Gamba were given a bye into the quarter-finals of the League Cup, where they were paired against Nagoya Grampus in a two-legged encounter. After a dramatic 10–9 penalty shoot-out victory over Nagoya, in which goalkeeper Yosuke Fujigaya struck the winning penalty, Gamba were drawn against Albirex Niigata in the semi-finals. A 3–2 aggregate win over Niigata set up a final against Kashima Antlers which they lost 3–0.

Round	Date	Opponents	H / A	Result F-A	Scorers	Attendance
QF	2 September 2015	Nagoya Grampus	H	1–1	Futagawa 6'	6,064
QF	6 September 2015	Nagoya Grampus	A	2–2; 10–9 on pens	Abe 41', Iwashita 94'	8,064
SF	7 October 2015	Albirex Niigata	A	1–2	Omori 33'	9,018
SF	11 October 2015	Albirex Niigata	H	2–0	Endō 57, Fujiharu 90+4'	11,475
F	31 October 2015	Kashima Antlers	N	0–3		50,828

=== Match day line-ups ===
The following players appeared for Gamba Osaka during the 2015 J.League Cup:

Player appearances – 2015 J.League Cup
Round	Opponent	GK	RB	LB	CB	CB	RM	LM	CM	CM	FW	FW	Substituted on	Substituted on	Substituted on
QF	Nagoya Grampus	Fujigaya	Hirao (substituted off)	Nishino	Kim	Konno	Abe	Futagawa (substituted off)	Myojin	Ideguchi	Lins	Akamine (substituted off)	Iwashita	Omori	Doan
QF	Nagoya Grampus	Fujigaya	Oh	Fujiharu	Kim	Iwashita	Abe (substituted off)	Futagawa (substituted off)	Endō	Konno	Patric	Kurata	Lins	Omori (substituted off)	Ideguchi
SF	Albirex Niigata	Fujigaya	Oh	Fujiharu	Kim	Nishino (substituted off)	Omori (substituted off)	Futagawa (substituted off)	Myojin	Ideguchi	Akamine	Kurata	Iwashita	Lins	Senoo
SF	Albirex Niigata	Fujigaya	Oh	Fujiharu	Nishino	Iwashita	Abe (substituted off)	Futagawa (substituted off)	Endō	Konno (substituted off)	Patric	Kurata	Myojin	Omori	Ideguchi
F	Kashima Antlers	Higashiguchi	Yonekura	Fujiharu	Niwa	Nishino (substituted off)	Abe (substituted off)	Kurata (substituted off)	Endō	Konno	Patric	Usami	Iwashita	Lins	Omori

(substituted on) = Substitute on, (substituted off) = Substitute Off, = Number of goals scored, = Yellow Card and = Red Card.

== Emperor's Cup ==
Due to their success in reaching the AFC Champions League semi-final, Gamba were given a bye to the 4th round of the Emperor's Cup where they were drawn away to fellow J-League 1 side Kawasaki Frontale. A 2–0 victory saw them progress to the quarter-finals where they were paired with another J-League 1 outfit, this time Sagan Tosu. A 3–1 win ensured they qualified for the semi-finals where they were again successful, this time beating 2015 J-League 1 Champions Sanfrecce Hiroshima 3–0 in a match played at Nagai Stadium. The final was played at Ajinomoto Stadium, Tokyo on 1 January 2016 and saw Gamba triumph 2–1 against the Urawa Red Diamonds to retain the trophy.

Round	Date	Opponents	H / A	Result F-A	Scorers	Attendance
4th round	15 November 2015	Kawasaki Frontale	H	2–0	Omori 45+2', Kurata 53'	7,345
Quarter-Final	26 December 2015	Sagan Tosu	H	3–1	Usami 26', 79', Nagasawa 80'	12,132
Semi-Final	29 December 2015	Sanfrecce Hiroshima	N	3–1	Usami 7', 74', Nagasawa 90+1'	17,027
Final	1 January 2016	Urawa Red Diamonds	N	2–1	Patric 32', 53'	43,809

=== Match day line-ups ===
The following players appeared for Gamba Osaka during the 2015 Emperor's Cup:

Player appearances – 2015 Emperor's Cup
Round	Opponent	GK	RB	LB	CB	CB	RM	LM	CM	CM	FW	FW	Substituted on	Substituted on	Substituted on
4R	Kawasaki Frontale	Higashiguchi	Yonekura	Oh	Niwa	Nishino	Abe (substituted off)	Omori	Endō	Konno	Patric (substituted off)	Kurata	Nagasawa	Ideguchi	
QF	Sagan Tosu	Higashiguchi	Yonekura	Konno	Niwa	Kim	Abe	Usami (substituted off)	Endō	Ideguchi (substituted off)	Patric (substituted off)	Kurata	Myojin	Nagasawa	Uchida
SF	Sanfrecce Hiroshima	Higashiguchi	Yonekura	Fujiharu	Niwa	Kim	Abe	Usami (substituted off)	Endō	Konno	Patric (substituted off)	Kurata	Nagasawa	Ideguchi	
F	Urawa Red Diamonds	Higashiguchi	Yonekura (substituted off)	Fujiharu	Niwa	Kim	Abe	Usami (substituted off)	Endō	Konno	Patric (substituted off)	Kurata	Nagasawa	Ideguchi	Uchida

(substituted on) = Substitute on, (substituted off) = Substitute Off, = Number of goals scored, = Yellow Card and = Red Card.

== Squad statistics ==
No.	Pos.	Name	League		Emperor's Cup		J.League Cup		Champions League		Other^{1}		Total		Discipline	
No.	Pos.	Name	Apps	Goals	Apps	Goals	Apps	Goals	Apps	Goals	Apps	Goals	Apps	Goals	Yellow card	Red card
1	GK	(Japan) Masaaki Higashiguchi	34	0	4	0	1	0	12	0	4	0	55	0	4	0
3	DF	(Japan) Takaharu Nishino	3	0	1	0	4	0	1	0	3	0	12	0	2	0
4	DF	(Japan) Hiroki Fujiharu	31(1)	0	2	0	4	1	9(2)	0	4(1)	1	50(4)	2	2	0
5	DF	(Japan) Daiki Niwa	34	0	4	0	1	0	12	0	4	0	55	0	5	0
6	DF	(South Korea) Kim Jung-ya	8(5)	0	3	0	3	0	4(3)	0	1	0	19(8)	0	3	1
7	MF	(Japan) Yasuhito Endō (c)	34	5	4	0	3	1	12	0	5	0	58	6	4	0
8	DF	(Japan) Keisuke Iwashita	24	0	0	0	2(3)	1	8(1)	0	2	0	36(4)	1	8	0
9	FW	(Brazil) Lins	4(16)	1	0	0	1(3)	0	2(8)	3	1(1)	0	8(28)	4	0	1
10	MF	(Japan) Takahiro Futagawa	0(2)	0	0	0	4	1	3(1)	0	0(1)	0	7(4)	1	0	0
11	MF	(Japan) Shu Kurata	24(7)	5	4	1	4	0	6(5)	2	1(4)	0	40(15)	8	8	0
13	MF	(Japan) Hiroyuki Abe	23(10)	4	4	0	4	1	12	3	3(2)	0	46(12)	8	1	0
14	DF	(Japan) Koki Yonekura	26(5)	2	4	0	1	0	9(1)	2	1(2)	0	41(8)	4	6	0
15	MF	(Japan) Yasuyuki Konno	28(3)	3	4	0	4	0	8	0	4	3	48(3)	6	11	0
16	GK	(Japan) Ken Tajiri	0	0	0	0	0	0	0	0	0	0	0	0	0	0
17	MF	(Japan) Tomokazu Myojin	5(5)	0	0(1)	0	2(1)	0	2(2)	0	2	0	11(9)	0	3	0
18	GK	(Japan) Yōsuke Fujigaya	0(1)	0	0	0	4	0	0	0	1	0	5(1)	0	0	0
19	MF	(Japan) Kotaro Omori	18(12)	3	1	1	1(4)	1	5(2)	1	5	0	30(18)	6	4	0
20	FW	(Japan) Shun Nagasawa	0(4)	2	0(4)	2	0	0	0(1)	0	2	1	2(9)	5	1	0
21	MF	(Japan) Yōsuke Ideguchi	4(4)	0	1(3)	0	2(2)	0	0(1)	0	1(2)	0	8(12)	0	0	0
22	DF	(South Korea) Oh Jae-suk	9(1)	0	1	0	3	0	4	0	4	0	21(1)	0	3	1
24	FW	(Japan) Shingo Akamine	2(11)	0	0	0	2	0	0(4)	0	2	0	6(15)	0	1	0
26	MF	(Japan) Naoya Senoo	0	0	0	0	0(1)	0	0	0	0	0	0(1)	0	0	0
27	MF	(Japan) Tatsuya Uchida	0	0	0(2)	0	0	0	0	0	0	0	0(2)	0	0	0
28	MF	(Japan) Shota Yomesaka	0	0	0	0	0	0	0	0	0	0	0	0	0	0
29	FW	(Brazil) Patric	27(5)	12	4	2	3	0	11	4	2(3)	2	47(8)	20	13	1
30	FW	(Japan) So Hirao	0	0	0	0	1	0	0	0	0(1)	0	1(1)	0	0	0
31	GK	(Japan) Mizuki Hayashi	0	0	0	0	0	0	0	0	0	0	0	0	0	0
33	MF	(Japan) Shōhei Ogura	1(5)	0	0	0	0	0	3(1)	0	0	0	4(6)	0	0	0
35	DF	(Japan) Ryo Hatsuse	0	0	0	0	0	0	0	0	0	0	0	0	0	0
38	MF	(Japan) Ritsu Doan	1(1)	0	0	0	0(1)	0	0	0	0(1)	0	1(3)	0	0	0
39	FW	(Japan) Takashi Usami	34	19	3	4	1	0	9(2)	4	4	1	51(2)	28	8	0
—	—	Own goals	–	0	–	0	–	0	–	1	–	0	–	1	–	–

Statistics accurate as of match played 1 January 2016.

^{1} Includes 2015 J1 League Championship, 2015 Japanese Super Cup and 2015 Suruga Bank Championship appearances.
