= Koki Yonekura =

Japanese footballer

Personal information
- Full name: Koki Yonekura
- Date of birth: May 17, 1988 (age 38)
- Place of birth: Inage-ku, Chiba, Japan
- Height: 1.76 m (5 ft 9 in)
- Position: Right back

Team information
- Current team: JEF United Chiba
- Number: 11

Youth career
- 2004–2006: Yachiyo High School

Senior career*
Years	Team	Apps	(Gls)
2007–2013	JEF United Chiba	136	(20)
2007	→ JEF Reserves (loan)	3	(0)
2014–2019	Gamba Osaka	120	(5)
2018	Gamba Osaka U-23	1	(0)
2019	→ JEF United Chiba (loan)	16	(1)
2020–	JEF United Chiba	113	(7)

International career
2015	Japan	2	(0)
Medal record
Gamba Osaka
Winner	J1 League	2014
Runner-up	J1 League	2015
Winner	J.League Cup	2014
Runner-up	J.League Cup	2015
Runner-up	J.League Cup	2016
Winner	Emperor's Cup	2014
Winner	Emperor's Cup	2015
- * Club domestic league appearances and goals as of 12 August 2026

Koki Yonekura (米倉 恒貴, Yonekura Kōki; born May 17, 1988 in Inage-ku, Chiba) is a Japanese footballer who plays for JEF United Chiba as a right full-back, and occasionally as an attacking midfielder.

He previously played for JEF United between 2007 and 2013.

== Club career ==
A native of Chiba, Yonekura attended Yachiyo High School in his home prefecture and after graduating he signed for local club JEF United in 2007. In total he would spend 7 seasons with the Ichihara-based club with the first two being spent in J1 League and the latter 5 in J2. Playing as either a right sided defender or midfielder he went on to make over 150 league appearances and score 20 goals for JEF.

During the 2013 season, Yonekura put in an outstanding performance in the 3-0 home victory over then J2 side Gamba Osaka. Despite this setback, Gamba went on to be crowned J2 champions in 2013 and signed Yonekura ahead of their return to Japan's top flight in 2014.

His first season in Osaka would prove to be a memorable one as Gamba wrapped up a domestic treble; lifting the J1 trophy in addition to the J.League Cup and Emperor's Cup. Yonekura scored 3 times in 34 appearances in all competitions and was a part of a rotation system with fellow full-backs Oh Jae-suk and Hiroki Fujiharu.

2015 saw him play almost 50 times across 5 competitions as Gamba once again lifted the Emperor's Cup, defeating Urawa Red Diamonds in the final, won the Japanese Super Cup, also against Urawa, and reached the semi-finals of the AFC Champions League before going down to Chinese side Guangzhou Evergrande.

Gamba didn't lift any silverware between 2016 and 2018 and Yonekura again spent much of that period rotating with Korean Oh Jae-suk. He fell out of favour with head-coach Kenta Hasegawa towards the end of his reign in 2017 and made only 13 league appearances that season. However the following year under the management of first, Brazilian Levir Culpi and, following his sacking, Tsuneyasu Miyamoto, Yonekura began to play more regularly, scoring once in 26 games as Gamba eventually finished up 9th in the league standings.

== International career ==
On 23 July 2015, Japan's coach Vahid Halilhodžić called him for the upcoming 2015 EAFF East Asian Cup. He featured twice during the competition as Japan ended up in 4th place.

== Club Career statistics ==
As of 2 December 2018

Club performance			League		Cup		League Cup		Continental		Other^{1}		Total	
Club	Season	League	Apps	Goals	Apps	Goals	Apps	Goals	Apps	Goals	Apps	Goals	Apps	Goals
Japan			League		Emperor's Cup		League Cup		Asia				Total	
2008	JEF United	J1	8	0	0	0	3	1	–		–		11	1
2009	JEF United	J1	16	0	3	2	4	0	–		–		23	2
2010	JEF United	J2	12	5	1	0	–		–		–		13	5
2011	JEF United	J2	35	7	3	1	–		–		–		38	8
2012	JEF United	J2	24	3	4	0	–		–		–		28	3
2013	JEF United	J2	41	6	1	0	–		–		–		42	7
Total			166	21	12	3	7	1	–		–		185	25
2014	Gamba Osaka	J1	21	1	4	0	9	2	–		–		34	3
2015	Gamba Osaka	J1	31	2	4	0	1	0	10	2	3	0	49	4
2016	Gamba Osaka	J1	21	1	0	0	5	0	5	0	0	0	31	1
2017	Gamba Osaka	J1	13	0	1	0	4	0	1	0	–		19	0
2018	Gamba Osaka	J1	26	1	0	0	6	0	-		-		32	1
2019	Gamba Osaka	J1	0	0	0	0	0	0	-		-		0	0
Total			112	5	9	0	25	2	16	2	3	0	165	9
Career Total			278	26	21	3	32	3	16	2	3	0	350	34

^{1} includes J. League Championship, Japanese Super Cup and Suruga Bank Championship appearances.

== Reserves performance ==
Last Updated: 21 March 2018

Club performance			League		Total	
Season	Club	League	Apps	Goals	Apps	Goals
Japan			League		Total	
2018	Gamba Osaka U-23	J3	1	0	1	0
Career total			1	0	1	0

== National team statistics ==
Japan national team
Year	Apps	Goals
2015	2	0
Total	2	0

== Honors ==
- J1 League – 2014
- Emperor's Cup – 2014, 2015
- J. League Cup – 2014
- Japanese Super Cup – 2015
