= Shota Yomesaka =

Japanese footballer

Shota Yomesaka 嫁阪 翔太
Personal information
- Full name: Shota Yomesaka
- Date of birth: 19 October 1996 (age 30)
- Place of birth: Sakai, Osaka, Japan
- Height: 1.77 m (5 ft 10 in)
- Positions: Defender; midfielder

Team information
- Current team: Nara Club
- Number: 39

Youth career
- 2001−2011: Rip Ace SC
- 2012−2014: Gamba Osaka

Senior career*
Years	Team	Apps	(Gls)
2015−2017	Gamba Osaka	0	(0)
2016−2017	→ Gamba Osaka U-23 (loan)	47	(0)
2018−2021	Grulla Morioka	86	(8)
2023–	Nara Club	33	(5)
Total		165	(13)
Medal record
Gamba Osaka
Runner-up	J1 League	2015
Runner-up	J.League Cup	2015
Runner-up	J.League Cup	2016
Winner	Emperor's Cup	2015
- * Club domestic league appearances and goals as of 14 January 2024 @ 12:46(AEST)

Shota Yomesaka (嫁阪 翔太, Yomesaka Shōta) is a Japanese football player. He is currently contracted to J3 League side Nara Club<

== Career statistics ==
Last update: 3 December 2017.

Club performance			League		Cup		League Cup		Continental		Other		Total	
Season	Club	League	Apps	Goals	Apps	Goals	Apps	Goals	Apps	Goals	Apps	Goals	Apps	Goals
Japan			League		Emperor's Cup		League Cup		Asia		Super Cup		Total	
2015	Gamba Osaka	J1 League	0	0	0	0	0	0	0	0	0	0	0	0
2016	Gamba Osaka	J1 League	0	0	0	0	0	0	0	0	0	0	0	0
2017	Gamba Osaka	J1 League	0	0	0	0	0	0	0	0	-		0	0
Total			0	0	0	0	0	0	0	0	0	0	0	0
2018	Grulla Morioka	J3 League	0	0	0	0	-		-		-		0	0
Total			0	0	0	0	-		-		-		0	0

Reserves performance

Club performance			League		Total	
Season	Club	League	Apps	Goals	Apps	Goals
Japan			League		Total	
2016	Gamba Osaka U-23	J3	19	0	19	0
2017	Gamba Osaka U-23	J3	28	0	28	0
Career total			47	0	47	0
