= Shōhei Ogura =

Japanese footballer

Shohei Ogura 小椋 祥平
Personal information
- Full name: Shohei Ogura
- Date of birth: September 8, 1985 (age 41)
- Place of birth: Funabashi, Chiba, Japan
- Height: 1.75 m (5 ft 9 in)
- Position: Midfielder

Youth career
- 2001–2003: Shutoku High School

Senior career*
Years	Team	Apps	(Gls)
2004–2007	Mito HollyHock	108	(3)
2008–2014	Yokohama F. Marinos	142	(2)
2015–2016	Gamba Osaka	8	(0)
2015	→ Montedio Yamagata (loan)	9	(0)
2016	→ Gamba Osaka U-23 (loan)	14	(0)
2017–2019	Ventforet Kofu	96	(4)

International career
2007	Japan U-23	1	(0)
Medal record
Yokohama F. Marinos
Runner-up	J1 League	2013
Winner	Emperor's Cup	2013
Gamba Osaka
Runner-up	J1 League	2015
Runner-up	J.League Cup	2015
Runner-up	J.League Cup	2016
Winner	Emperor's Cup	2015
- * Club domestic league appearances and goals

Shohei Ogura (小椋 祥平, Ogura Shōhei; born September 8, 1985) is a Japanese former football player who played as defensive midfielder.

Nicknamed "Mamushi" for his close marking of players, Ogura struggled with injuries throughout his career. He made over 360 career appearances, mainly for Yokohama F. Marinos.

== Career ==
Ogura started his career after participating in a training session with J2 League club Mito Hollyhock. He performed well in the training session, leading to an offer from the club. He was encouraged by his older brother Kyoji to join Mito. He gained the nickname "Mamushi" after closely marking Juninho for 90 minutes. He stayed at the club until joining Yokohama F. Marinos in 2008.

On 7 January 2015, Ogura was announced at Gamba Osaka on a permanent transfer. After making just two appearances for Gamba Osaka during the 2016 season, and 14 appearances for Gamba Osaka U-23, the club announced they would not be renewing his contract for the 2017 season.

On 30 July 2015, Ogura was announced at Montedio Yamagata on a six month loan spell. On 11 January 2016, his loan expired with the club and he returned to Gamba Osaka.

On 1 February 2017, Ogura was announced at Ventforet Kofu on a permanent transfer. During the 2017 season, he played 31 league matches and scored one goal.

In January 2020, Ogura announced he would retire from playing at the end of the 2019 season.

== National team career ==
On December 30, 2006, Ogura was selected for the Japan U-23 national team.

== Personal life ==
During his time at Yokohama F. Marinos, Ogura owned a pet dog. After retiring, he opened a total recovery room in Ginza.

== Club statistics ==
Updated to 23 February 2017.

Club performance			League		Cup		League Cup		Continental		Other		Total	
Club	Season	League	Apps	Goals	Apps	Goals	Apps	Goals	Apps	Goals	Apps	Goals	Apps	Goals
Japan			League		Emperor's Cup		J.League Cup		AFC		Super Cup		Total	
Mito HollyHock	2004	J2	15	0	0	0	-		-		-		15	0
Mito HollyHock	2005	J2	21	0	1	0	-		-		-		22	0
Mito HollyHock	2006	J2	30	1	1	0	-		-		-		31	1
Mito HollyHock	2007	J2	42	2	2	0	-		-		-		44	2
Mito HollyHock	Total		108	3	4	0	-		-		-		112	3
Yokohama F. Marinos	2008	J1	12	0	4	0	3	0	-		-		19	0
Yokohama F. Marinos	2009	J1	26	1	3	0	9	0	-		-		38	1
Yokohama F. Marinos	2010	J1	31	0	0	0	5	1	-		-		36	1
Yokohama F. Marinos	2011	J1	33	1	5	0	4	0	-		-		42	1
Yokohama F. Marinos	2012	J1	4	0	0	0	2	0	-		-		6	0
Yokohama F. Marinos	2013	J1	17	0	3	0	3	0	-		-		23	0
Yokohama F. Marinos	2014	J1	19	0	0	0	2	0	4	0	-		25	0
Yokohama F. Marinos	Total		142	2	15	0	28	1	4	0	-		189	3
Gamba Osaka	2015	J1	6	0	0	0	0	0	4	0	0	0	10	0
Gamba Osaka	2016	J1	2	0	0	0	0	0	0	0	0	0	2	0
Gamba Osaka	Total		7	0	0	0	0	0	4	0	0	0	11	0
Montedio Yamagata	2015	J1	9	2	3	0	0	0	0	0	0	0	12	2
Montedio Yamagata	Total		9	2	3	0	0	0	0	0	0	0	12	2
Ventforet Kofu	2017	J1	31	1	1	0	0	0	-		-		32	1
Ventforet Kofu	Total		31	1	1	0	0	0	-		-		32	1
Career total			298	8	23	0	28	1	8	0	0	0	357	9

Reserves performance

Club performance			League		Total	
Season	Club	League	Apps	Goals	Apps	Goals
Japan			League		Total	
2016	Gamba Osaka U-23	J3	14	0	14	0
Career total			14	0	14	0

== Honours ==
Yokohama F. Marinos

- Emperor's Cup: 2013

Gamba Osaka

- Japanese Super Cup: 2015
