= Mizuki Hayashi =

Japanese footballer

Mizuki Hayashi 林 瑞輝
Personal information
- Full name: Mizuki Hayashi
- Date of birth: 4 September 1996 (age 30)
- Place of birth: Osaka, Japan
- Height: 1.82 m (6 ft 0 in)
- Position: Goalkeeper

Team information
- Current team: Gamba Osaka

Youth career
- 2007–2008: Owada SSC
- 2009–2014: Gamba Osaka

Senior career*
Years	Team	Apps	(Gls)
2015–2021	Gamba Osaka	7	(0)
2016–2019	Gamba Osaka U-23	50	(0)
2020	→ Renofa Yamaguchi (loan)	4	(0)

International career
2013	Japan U-17	1	(0)
2014	Japan U-18	2	(0)
Medal record
Gamba Osaka
Runner-up	J1 League	2015
Runner-up	J.League Cup	2015
Runner-up	J.League Cup	2016
Winner	Emperor's Cup	2015
Representing Japan
AFC U-16 Championship
Silver medal – second place	2012 Iran
- * Club domestic league appearances and goals as of 18:29, 19 January 2021 (UTC)

Mizuki Hayashi (林 瑞輝, Hayashi Mizuki) is a Japanese footballer who plays as a goalkeeper. He last played for Gamba Osaka.

== Club career ==
Born and raised in Osaka, Hayashi came up through the youth ranks at Gamba Osaka and signed his first professional contract with the club ahead of the 2015 season. He didn't make any senior appearances through his first 3 seasons with the top team squad and eventually made his J.League debut on 21 April 2018 as a 16th minute substitute for the injured Masaaki Higashiguchi in the Osaka derby match against Cerezo Osaka. Gamba won the game 1-0 thanks to Hwang Ui-jo's first-half penalty. Owing to Higashiguchi's ongoing injury problems, Hayashi played 7 times in J1 and kept 2 clean sheets. He also played another 6 games in the cup competitions, 5 in the J.League Cup and once in the Emperor's Cup.

Gamba launched an under-23 side in J3 League in J3 and Hayashi was part of a goalkeeping rotation which saw him play 13 times. He went on to become first choice 'keeper in 2017 playing 28 out of 32 games in what was a disappointing season that culminated in a 16th-place finish. 2018 was more successful for Gamba Under-23, finishing 6th in the final standings, however, by this time Hayashi was now officially Gamba's J1 team backup goalkeeper and his reserve appearances were limited to just 4 games.

== National team career ==
In October 2013, Hayashi was elected Japan U-17 national team for 2013 U-17 World Cup. He played 1 match against Tunisia.

== Club statistics ==
Appearances and goals by club, season and competition
Club	Season	League			National Cup		League Cup		Total	
Club	Season	Division	Apps	Goals	Apps	Goals	Apps	Goals	Apps	Goals
Japan			League		Emperor's Cup		J. League Cup		Total	
Gamba Osaka	2015	J1 League	0	0	0	0	0	0	0	0
Gamba Osaka	2016	J1 League	0	0	0	0	0	0	0	0
Gamba Osaka	2017	J1 League	0	0	0	0	0	0	0	0
Gamba Osaka	2018	J1 League	7	0	1	0	5	0	13	0
Gamba Osaka	2019	J1 League	0	0	0	0	5	0	5	0
Gamba Osaka	Total		7	0	1	0	10	0	18	0
Gamba Osaka U-23	2016	J3 League	13	0	0	0	–		13	0
Gamba Osaka U-23	2017	J3 League	28	0	0	0	–		28	0
Gamba Osaka U-23	2018	J3 League	4	0	0	0	–		4	0
Gamba Osaka U-23	2019	J3 League	5	0	0	0	–		5	0
Gamba Osaka U-23	Total		50	0	0	0	0	0	50	0
Renofa Yamaguchi (loan)	2020	J2 League	4	0	0	0	–		4	0
Career total			61	0	1	0	10	0	72	0
