= Masaaki Higashiguchi =

Japanese footballer

Masaaki Higashiguchi 東口 順昭
Personal information
- Full name: Masaaki Higashiguchi
- Date of birth: 12 May 1986 (age 40)
- Place of birth: Takatsuki, Osaka, Japan
- Height: 1.84 m (6 ft 0 in)
- Position: Goalkeeper

Team information
- Current team: Gamba Osaka
- Number: 1

Youth career
- 1999–2001: Gamba Osaka
- 2002–2004: Rakunan High School

College career
Years	Team	Apps	(Gls)
2005–2006	Fukui University of Technology		
2007–2008	Niigata University of Management		

Senior career*
Years	Team	Apps	(Gls)
2009–2013	Albirex Niigata	84	(0)
2014–	Gamba Osaka	325	(0)

International career^{‡}
2015–2019	Japan	8	(0)
Medal record
Gamba Osaka
Winner	J1 League	2014
Runner-up	J1 League	2015
Winner	J.League Cup	2014
Runner-up	J.League Cup	2015
Runner-up	J.League Cup	2016
Winner	Emperor's Cup	2014
Winner	Emperor's Cup	2015
Representing Japan
AFC Asian Cup
Silver medal – second place	2019 United Arab Emirates
- * Club domestic league appearances and goals as of 9 August 2026 ‡ National team caps and goals as of 22 March 2019

Masaaki Higashiguchi (東口 順昭, Higashiguchi Masaaki; born 12 May 1986) is a Japanese professional footballer who plays as a goalkeeper for Gamba Osaka and the Japan national football team. He previously played for Albirex Niigata.

== Club career ==
A native of Osaka, Higashiguchi spent time in Gamba Osaka's youth system prior to entering university, first at the Fukui University of Technology and later at the Niigata University of Management where he represented their football team in the 2008 Emperor's Cup.

After graduating from university, Higashiguchi signed his first professional contract with then J1 League outfit Albirex Niigata. He spent five seasons with the men from the Japan Sea coast and played a total of 84 league games before returning to Osaka in 2014.

Gamba Osaka had just been promoted back to J1 League following their shock relegation in 2012, when they acquired Higashiguchi to be their new first-choice goalkeeper ahead of the 2014 campaign. Things could not have got off to a better start for him at his new club as they went on to lift the J1 League title, the J.League Cup and the Emperor's Cup. The Osaka giants followed that up by winning the 2015 Japanese Super Cup and Emperor's Cup trophies, defeating Urawa Red Diamonds in the final of both competitions, as well as reaching the semi-finals of the AFC Champions League before going down to Guangzhou Evergrande over two legs in the semi-finals. Higashiguchi played 55 times in all competitions in 2015 adding to the 50 appearances he made in 2014.

Gamba did not win any silverware between 2016 and 2018, however, Higashiguchi remained the undisputed first-choice between the sticks; he was an ever present during the 2016 league campaign before missing 1 and 5 league games respectively due to injury in the 2017 and 2018 seasons.

== International career ==
On 23 July 2015, Japan's coach Vahid Halilhodžić called him up to the national team for the first time ahead of the upcoming 2015 EAFF East Asian Cup. He debuted against China, in the last match of the tournament, a 1–1 draw.

His next international involvement would come in a World Cup qualifier at home to Afghanistan in March 2016. The match would see Higashiguchi keep his first clean sheet for the national team as Japan ran out 5–0 winners. After this is would be another 19 months before his next cap in a 3–3 draw in a friendly match at home to Haiti on 10 October 2017. Two months later he was named in the squad for the 2017 EAFF E-1 Football Championship in his home country. Like two years previously, his only involvement was in a match against China which Japan won this time 2–1 to help themselves to the runners-up spot in the tournament behind South Korea.

He was named in Japan's squad for the 2018 FIFA World Cup in Russia., but did not play in any of the team's matches as Eiji Kawashima started all four of their games. He did, however, play in a pre-tournament friendly against Paraguay on 12 June, the match ending in a 4–2 Japanese victory. He played a further 2 international matches in 2018, the home friendly victories over Costa Rica in October and Uruguay in November.

He was named in the final Japan squad for the 2019 AFC Asian Cup in the United Arab Emirates in January 2019 alongside fellow goalkeepers Shūichi Gonda and Daniel Schmidt, however, like the World Cup 6 months earlier he did not make any appearances.

== Career statistics ==
=== Club ===
As of match played 30 May 2026.

Appearances and goals by club, season and competition
Club	Season	League			Emperor's Cup		J. League Cup		Asia		Other (Note: Appearances in J. League Championship and Japanese Super Cup)		Total	
Club	Season	Division	Apps	Goals	Apps	Goals	Apps	Goals	Apps	Goals	Apps	Goals	Apps	Goals
Niigata University of Management	2008		—		1	0	—		—		—		1	0
Albirex Niigata	2009	J. League Division 1	0	0	0	0	1	0	—		—		1	0
Albirex Niigata	2010	J. League Division 1	25	0	2	0	5	0	—		—		32	0
Albirex Niigata	2011	J. League Division 1	14	0	0	0	0	0	—		—		14	0
Albirex Niigata	2012	J. League Division 1	24	0	0	0	4	0	—		—		28	0
Albirex Niigata	2013	J. League Division 1	21	0	0	0	0	0	—		—		21	0
Albirex Niigata	Total		84	0	2	0	10	0	—		—		96	0
Gamba Osaka	2014	J1 League	34	0	6	0	10	0	—		—		50	0
Gamba Osaka	2015	J1 League	34	0	4	0	1	0	12	0	4	0	55	0
Gamba Osaka	2016	J1 League	34	0	0	0	1	0	5	0	1	0	41	0
Gamba Osaka	2017	J1 League	33	0	2	0	0	0	6	0	—		41	0
Gamba Osaka	2018	J1 League	29	0	0	0	3	0	—		—		32	0
Gamba Osaka	2019	J1 League	34	0	2	0	6	0	—		—		42	0
Gamba Osaka	2020	J1 League	34	0	2	0	1	0	—		—		37	0
Gamba Osaka	2021	J1 League	38	0	1	0	2	0	4	0	1	0	46	0
Gamba Osaka	2022	J1 League	19	0	1	0	0	0	—		—		20	0
Gamba Osaka	2023	J1 League	23	0	0	0	6	0	—		—		29	0
Gamba Osaka	2024	J1 League	0	0	1	0	0	0	—		—		1	0
Gamba Osaka	2025	J1 League	1	0	0	0	3	0	6	0	—		10	0
Gamba Osaka	2026	J1 (100)	12	0	—		—		6	0	—		18	0
Gamba Osaka	Total		325	0	19	0	33	0	39	0	6	0	422	0
Career total			409	0	22	0	43	0	39	0	6	0	519	0

=== International ===
As of 22 March 2019

Appearances and goals by national team and year
National team	Year	Apps	Goals
Japan	2015	1	0
Japan	2016	1	0
Japan	2017	2	0
Japan	2018	3	0
Japan	2019	1	0
Total		8	0

== Honors ==
Gamba Osaka

- J. League Division 1: 2014
- Emperor's Cup: 2014, 2015
- J. League Cup: 2014
- Japanese Super Cup: 2015
- AFC Champions League Two: 2025–26

Japan

- AFC Asian Cup runner-up: 2019
