= 2015 Japanese Super Cup =

Gamba Osaka	Urawa Red Diamonds
2	0
- Date: 28 February 2015
- Venue: Nissan Stadium, Yokohama
- Referee: Yudai Yamamoto
- Attendance: 47,666

The 2015 Japanese Super Cup was held on 28 February 2015 between the 2014 J.League champions Gamba Osaka and the 2014 J.League runner-up Urawa Red Diamonds.

This was both clubs' third encounter in the Super Cup, Urawa having won in 2006 and Gamba in 2007. Gamba won the match 2–0 after a goal each by Takashi Usami and Patric.

== Match ==
28 February 2015
13:35 JST

Gamba Osaka	2–0	Urawa Red Diamonds
Usami 68'; Patric 90+3'	Summary

Nissan Stadium, Yokohama
Attendance: 47,666
Referee: (Japan) Yudai Yamamoto

Gamba Osaka
GK	1	(Japan) Masaaki Higashiguchi
CB	5	(Japan) Daiki Niwa
CB	8	(Japan) Keisuke Iwashita
RB	22	(South Korea) Oh Jae-suk
LB	4	(Japan) Hiroki Fujiharu
CM	7	(Japan) Yasuhito Endō (c)
CM	17	(Japan) Tomokazu Myojin	(yellow card) 34'
RM	11	(Japan) Shu Kurata
LM	19	(Japan) Kotaro Omori		(substituted off) 90'
CF	24	(Japan) Shingo Akamine		(substituted off) 63'
CF	39	(Japan) Takashi Usami		(substituted off) 78'
Substitutes:
GK	16	(Japan) Ken Tajiri
CB	6	(South Korea) Kim Jung-ya
RB	14	(Japan) Koki Yonekura
RM	13	(Japan) Hiroyuki Abe		(substituted on) 90'
DM	33	(Japan) Shōhei Ogura
CF	9	(Brazil) Lins		(substituted on) 78'
CF	29	(Brazil) Patric	(yellow card) 90'	(substituted on) 63'
Manager:
(Japan) Kenta Hasegawa

Urawa Red Diamonds
GK	1	(Japan) Shusaku Nishikawa
CB	4	(Japan) Daisuke Nasu		(substituted off) 87'
CB	5	(Japan) Tomoaki Makino
CB	46	(Japan) Ryota Moriwaki	(yellow card) 86'
DM	8	(Japan) Yōsuke Kashiwagi
DM	22	(Japan) Yuki Abe (c)
RM	14	(Japan) Tadaaki Hirakawa
LM	24	(Japan) Takahiro Sekine	(yellow card) 11'
AM	7	(Japan) Tsukasa Umesaki	(yellow card) 48'	(substituted off) 72'
AM	31	(Japan) Toshiyuki Takagi		(substituted off) 56'
CF	29	(Japan) Tadanari Lee
Substitutes:
GK	23	(Japan) Nao Iwadate
RB	2	(Japan) Kenichi Kaga
DM	16	(Japan) Takuya Aoki
DM	18	(Japan) Shuto Kojima
DM	13	(Japan) Keita Suzuki		(substituted on) 87'
CF	21	(Slovenia) Zlatan Ljubijankić		(substituted on) 56'
SS	19	(Japan) Yuki Muto		(substituted on) 72'
Manager:
(Serbia) Mihailo Petrović

=== Statistics ===
Statistic	Gamba Osaka	Urawa Red Diamonds
Goals scored	2	0
Possession	37%	63%
Shots on target	4	2
Shots off target	2	5
Corner kicks	4	3
Fouls	24	18
Offsides	0	1
Yellow cards	2	3
Red cards	0	0
