= Shun Nagasawa =

Japanese footballer

- Shun Nagasawa in 2017

Personal information
- Full name: Shun Nagasawa
- Date of birth: 25 August 1988 (age 38)
- Place of birth: Shizuoka, Japan
- Height: 1.92 m (6 ft 4 in)
- Position: Forward

Team information
- Current team: Kyoto Sanga
- Number: 93

Youth career
- –2006: Shimizu S-Pulse

Senior career*
Years	Team	Apps	(Gls)
2007−2015	Shimizu S-Pulse	30	(5)
2011	→ Roasso Kumamoto (loan)	33	(8)
2012	→ Kyoto Sanga (loan)	14	(1)
2013	→ Matsumoto Yamaga (loan)	32	(3)
2015−2018	Gamba Osaka	75	(23)
2018	→ Vissel Kobe (loan)	5	(1)
2019−2021	Vegalta Sendai	64	(16)
2021–2025	Oita Trinita	105	(21)
2025–	Kyoto Sanga	26	(3)
Medal record
Shimizu S-Pulse
Runner-up	J.League Cup	2008
Runner-up	Emperor's Cup	2010
Gamba Osaka
Runner-up	J1 League	2015
Runner-up	J.League Cup	2015
Runner-up	J.League Cup	2016
Winner	Emperor's Cup	2015
- * Club domestic league appearances and goals as of 1 August 2026

Shun Nagasawa (長沢 駿, Nagasawa Shun; born 25 August 1988 in Shizuoka) is a Japanese professional football player who plays as a forward for J1 League team Kyoto Sanga FC.

After starting his career with Shimizu S-Pulse, Nagasawa has played in over 350 league matches.

== Career ==
On 11 January 2013, Nagasawa was announced at Matsumoto Yamaga on a one year loan deal.

During Shimizu S-Pulse's 2015 season, Nagasawa was appointed vice-captain.

On 8 July 2015, Nagasawa was announced at Gamba Osaka on a permanent transfer. He scored 4 goals against Nagoya Grampus in the J.League Cup on 4 April 2018. During Nagasawa's time at Gamba Osaka, he played in the AFC Champions League Elite.

On 13 August 2018, Nagasawa was announced at Vissel Kobe on a six month loan deal.

On 29 December 2018, Nagasawa was announced at Vegalta Sendai on a permanent transfer. During the 2020 season, he scored a hattrick against Gamba Osaka on 14 November, becoming the second player in Vegalta Sendai's history to score a hattrick.

On 7 January 2021, Nagasawa was announced at Oita Trinita on a permanent transfer. During the 2022 season, he played in 26 league matches and scored 11 goals, despite being sidelined with injury for part of the season. This led to the club extending his contract for the 2023 season. Although his contract initially expired with the club on 26 November 2023, he resigned with the club on 21 January 2024. On 20 November 2024, the club announced that his contract would be expiring at the end of the 2024 season.

On 30 December 2024, Nagasawa was announced at Kyoto Sanga on a permanent transfer, returning to the club after 12 years.

== Career statistics ==
As of 22 November 2023

Appearances and goals by club, season and competition
Club	Season	League			Cup		League Cup		Continental		Other		Total	
Club	Season	Division	Apps	Goals	Apps	Goals	Apps	Goals	Apps	Goals	Apps	Goals	Apps	Goals
Shimizu S-Pulse	2009	J1 League	5	0	0	0	—		—		—		5	0
Shimizu S-Pulse	2010	J1 League	1	0	0	0	3	0	—		—		4	0
Shimizu S-Pulse	2014	J1 League	10	4	1	0	2	2	—		—		13	6
Shimizu S-Pulse	2015	J1 League	14	1	0	0	2	0	—		—		16	1
Shimizu S-Pulse	Total		30	5	1	0	7	2	—		—		38	7
Roasso Kumamoto (loan)	2011	J2 League	33	8	0	0	—		—		—		33	8
Kyoto Sanga (loan)	2012	J2 League	14	1	0	0	—		—		—		14	1
Matsumoto Yamaga (loan)	2013	J2 League	32	3	0	0	—		—		—		32	3
Gamba Osaka	2015	J1 League	6	3	4	2	—		1	0	—		11	5
Gamba Osaka	2016	J1 League	21	9	2	1	4	2	5	0	—		32	12
Gamba Osaka	2017	J1 League	34	10	1	1	4	1	7	4	—		46	16
Gamba Osaka	2018	J1 League	14	1	1	0	7	7	—		—		22	8
Gamba Osaka	Total		75	23	8	4	15	10	13	4	—		111	41
Vissel Kobe	2018	J1 League	5	1	0	0	0	0	—		—		5	1
Vegalta Sendai	2019	J1 League	31	7	2	0	6	3	—		—		39	10
Vegalta Sendai	2020	J1 League	33	9	—		1	0	—		—		34	9
Vegalta Sendai	Total		64	16	2	0	7	3	—		—		73	19
Oita Trinita	2021	J1 League	32	4	3	1	2	1	—		—		37	6
Oita Trinita	2022	J2 League	23	8	0	0	2	3	—		1	0	26	11
Oita Trinita	2023	J2 League	22	3	0	0	—		—		—		22	3
Oita Trinita	Total		77	15	3	1	4	4	—		1	0	85	20
Career totals			330	72	14	5	33	19	13	4	1	0	391	100

== Honours ==
Gamba Osaka

- Emperor's Cup: 2015

Individual Performance

- J1 MVP August 2016
