= So Hirao =

Japanese footballer

So Hirao 平尾 壮
Personal information
- Full name: So Hirao
- Date of birth: 1 July 1996 (age 30)
- Place of birth: Tondabayashi, Osaka, Japan
- Height: 1.70 m (5 ft 7 in)
- Position: Right back

Team information
- Current team: Reilac Shiga FC
- Number: 50

Senior career*
Years	Team	Apps	(Gls)
2015−2018	Gamba Osaka	0	(0)
2015	→ J. League U-22 (loan)	9	(0)
2016−2017	→ Gamba Osaka U-23 (loan)	51	(1)
2018	→ Avispa Fukuoka (loan)	5	(0)
2019	Machida Zelvia	3	(0)
2020–2023	Thespakusatsu Gunma	53	(0)
2023-	Reilac Shiga FC	28	(2)
Medal record
Gamba Osaka
Runner-up	J1 League	2015
Runner-up	J.League Cup	2015
Runner-up	J.League Cup	2016
Winner	Emperor's Cup	2015
- * Club domestic league appearances and goals as of 25/1/24 @ 15:28PM(AEST)

So Hirao (平尾 壮, Hirao Sō) is a Japanese football player. He currently plays for J2 League side Thespakusatsu Gunma.

== Career statistics ==
Last update: 2 December 2018.

Club performance			League		Cup		League Cup		Continental		Other		Total	
Season	Club	League	Apps	Goals	Apps	Goals	Apps	Goals	Apps	Goals	Apps	Goals	Apps	Goals
Japan			League		Emperor's Cup		League Cup		Asia		Super Cup		Total	
2015	Gamba Osaka	J1 League	0	0	0	0	1	0	0	0	0	0	1	0
2016	Gamba Osaka	J1 League	0	0	0	0	0	0	0	0	0	0	0	0
2017	Gamba Osaka	J1 League	0	0	0	0	1	0	0	0	-		1	0
Total			0	0	0	0	2	0	0	0	0	0	2	0
2018	Avispa Fukuoka	J2 League	5	0	0	0	-		-		-		5	0
Total			5	0	2	0	-		-		-		7	0
Career total			5	0	2	0	2	0	0	0	0	0	9	0

Reserves performance

Club performance			League		Total	
Season	Club	League	Apps	Goals	Apps	Goals
Japan			League		Total	
2015	J.League U-22 Selection	J3 League	9	0	9	0
2016	Gamba Osaka U-23	J3 League	27	1	27	1
2017	Gamba Osaka U-23	J3 League	24	0	24	0
Career total			60	1	60	1
