= Hiroyuki Abe (footballer) =

Japanese footballer

Hiroyuki Abe 阿部浩之
Personal information
- Full name: Hiroyuki Abe
- Date of birth: July 5, 1989 (age 37)
- Place of birth: Kitakatsuragi, Nara, Japan
- Height: 1.70 m (5 ft 7 in)
- Positions: Attacking midfielder; winger

Team information
- Current team: Shonan Bellmare
- Number: 7

Youth career
- 1996–2001: Entrada SC
- 2002–2004: Takada FC
- 2005–2007: Osaka Tōin High School

College career
Years	Team	Apps	(Gls)
2008–2011	Kwansei Gakuin University		

Senior career*
Years	Team	Apps	(Gls)
2012–2016	Gamba Osaka	138	(21)
2016	→ Gamba Osaka U-23 (loan)	2	(0)
2017–2019	Kawasaki Frontale	80	(22)
2020–2022	Nagoya Grampus	51	(5)
2022	→ Shonan Bellmare (loan)	13	(3)
2023−2024	Shonan Bellmare	54	(4)

International career^{‡}
2017	Japan	3	(0)
- * Club domestic league appearances and goals as of 30 November 2022 ‡ National team caps and goals as of 31 December 2017

Hiroyuki Abe (阿部 浩之, Abe Hiroyuki; born 5 July 1989) is a Japanese former professional footballer who played as an attacking midfielder or a winger.

== Club statistics ==
Updated to 9 July 2022.

Club	Season	League			Emperor's Cup		J. League Cup		Asia		Other^{1}		Total	
Club	Season	Division	Apps	Goals	Apps	Goals	Apps	Goals	Apps	Goals	Apps	Goals	Apps	Goals
Gamba Osaka	2012	J1 League	18	2	3	1	1	0	0	0	—		22	3
Gamba Osaka	2013	J2 League	30	5	2	0	—		—		—		32	5
Gamba Osaka	2014	J1 League	30	7	3	0	9	3	—		—		42	10
Gamba Osaka	2015	J1 League	31	4	4	0	4	1	12	3	5	0	56	8
Gamba Osaka	2016	J1 League	24	3	1	0	2	1	3	0	1	0	31	4
Gamba Osaka	Total		133	21	13	1	16	5	15	3	6	0	183	30
Gamba Osaka U-23	2016	J3 League	2	0	—		—		—		—		2	0
Kawasaki Frontale	2017	J1 League	28	10	1	0	3	3	8	1	—		40	14
Kawasaki Frontale	2018	J1 League	29	5	1	0	2	1	4	0	1	0	37	6
Kawasaki Frontale	2019	J1 League	23	7	3	0	5	2	2	0	1	0	34	9
Kawasaki Frontale	Total		80	22	5	0	10	6	14	1	2	0	111	29
Nagoya Grampus	2020	J1 League	27	4	0	0	2	0	—		—		29	4
Nagoya Grampus	2021	J1 League	8	0	2	0	0	0	4	2	—		14	2
Nagoya Grampus	2022	J1 League	15	1	2	2	6	1	—		—		23	4
Nagoya Grampus	Total		50	5	4	2	8	1	4	2	0	0	66	10
Career total			263	48	22	3	34	12	33	6	8	0	360	69

^{1} includes J. League Championship, Japanese Super Cup and Suruga Bank Championship appearances.

== National team statistics ==
Japan national team
Year	Apps	Goals
2017	3	0
Total	3	0

== Honours ==
Gamba Osaka

- J1 League – 2014
- J2 League – 2013
- Emperor's Cup – 2014, 2015
- J.League Cup – 2014
- Japanese Super Cup – 2015

Kawasaki Frontale

- J1 League – 2017, 2018
- J.League Cup – 2019
- Japanese Super Cup – 2019
