= Yuto Uchida =

Japanese footballer

Yuto Uchida 内田 裕斗
Personal information
- Full name: Yuto Uchida
- Date of birth: 29 April 1995 (age 31)
- Place of birth: Ibaraki, Osaka, Japan
- Height: 1.71 m (5 ft 7 in)
- Position: Left back

Youth career
- 2008–2013: Gamba Osaka

Senior career*
Years	Team	Apps	(Gls)
2014–2015	Gamba Osaka	0	(0)
2014	→ J. League U-22 (loan)	6	(0)
2015	→ Tokushima Vortis (loan)	26	(2)
2016–2019	Tokushima Vortis	143	(9)
2020–2021	Sagan Tosu	24	(1)
2022–2024	Vegalta Sendai	34	(1)

International career
2006	Japan U16		
2007	Japan U17		
2008	Japan U18		
2009	Japan U19		
Medal record
Gamba Osaka
Winner	J1 League	2014
Winner	J.League Cup	2014
Winner	Emperor's Cup	2014
- * Club domestic league appearances and goals as of 15:51, 12 July 2020 (UTC)

Yuto Uchida (内田 裕斗, Uchida Yūto; born 29 April 1995 in Ibaraki, Osaka) is a Japanese footballer who plays for Vegalta Sendai.

== Club statistics ==
Updated to end of 2021 season.

Club performance			League		Cup		League Cup		Total	
Season	Club	League	Apps	Goals	Apps	Goals	Apps	Goals	Apps	Goals
Japan			League		Emperor's Cup		J. League Cup		Total	
2014	Gamba Osaka	J1 League	0	0	0	0	1	0	1	0
2014	J.League U-22 Selection	J3 League	6	0	–		–		6	0
Total			6	0	0	0	1	0	7	0
2015	Tokushima Vortis	J2 League	26	2	1	1	–		27	3
2016	Tokushima Vortis	J2 League	31	1	2	0	–		33	1
2017	Tokushima Vortis	J2 League	21	3	0	0	–		21	3
2018	Tokushima Vortis	J2 League	26	1	1	0	–		27	1
2019	Tokushima Vortis	J2 League	37	2	1	0	–		38	2
Total			141	9	5	1	0	0	146	10
2020	Sagan Tosu	J1 League	23	1	–		1	0	24	1
2021	Sagan Tosu	J1 League	1	0	0	0	3	0	4	0
Total			24	1	0	0	4	0	28	1
2022	Vegalta Sendai	J2 League	34	1	0	0	–		34	1
Total			34	1	0	0	0	0	34	1
Career total			205	11	5	1	5	0	215	12

== International ==
- Japan national under-16 football team
- Japan national under-17 football team
- Japan national under-18 football team
  - 2014 AFC U-19 Championship Qualifiers
- Japan national under-19 football team
