= Lins (footballer) =

Brazilian footballer (born 1987)

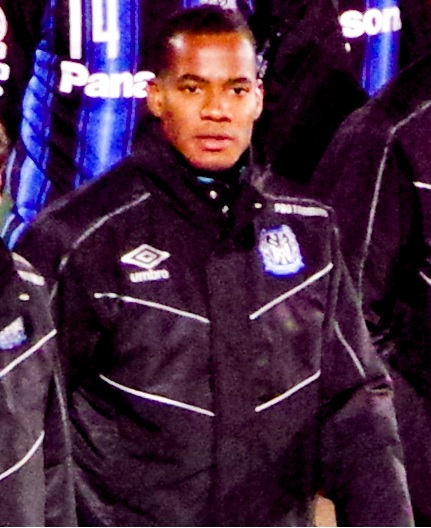

Personal information
- Full name: Lins Lima de Brito
- Date of birth: 11 September 1987 (age 39)
- Place of birth: Camaçari, Brazil
- Height: 1.72 m (5 ft 7 1/2 in)
- Positions: Striker; right winger

Youth career
- 2000–2006: SC Camaçariense

Senior career*
Years	Team	Apps	(Gls)
2004–2006	Camaçariense	0	(0)
2006–2008	Mogi Mirim	0	(0)
2008	São Caetano	0	(0)
2008	Paulista	0	(0)
2009	Guaratinguetá	7	(2)
2009	Ponte Preta	26	(7)
2010	Mirassol	18	(6)
2010–2013	Criciúma	69	(24)
2011	→ Grêmio (loan)	13	(1)
2011	→ ABC (loan)	18	(8)
2012	→ Itumbiara (loan)	16	(5)
2014–2015	Gamba Osaka	46	(6)
2016	Figueirense	25	(3)
2017	Ponte Preta	10	(0)
2017–2018	Ventforet Kofu	28	(11)
2018	FC Tokyo	18	(3)
2019	Beijing BSU	15	(3)
- * Club domestic league appearances and goals as of 20:00, 31 December 2019 (UTC)

Lins Lima de Brito, known as just Lins, is a Brazilian footballer who plays as a striker or right winger.

== Club career ==
After many loan-stints around Brazil, he found more space going into J. League, where he played for Gamba Osaka, even winning a treble with the club in 2014. He collected the strange nickname of Linswandowski in his time in Osaka, before leaving in early 2016.

In February 2019, Lins transferred to China League One side Beijing BSU.

== Career statistics ==
=== Club statistics ===
Updated 31 December 2019.

Appearances and goals by club, season and competition
Club	Season	League			National Cup		League Cup		Continental		Other		Total	
Club	Season	Division	Apps	Goals	Apps	Goals	Apps	Goals	Apps	Goals	Apps	Goals	Apps	Goals
Guaratinguetá	2009	-	-		-		-		-		7 (Note: Appearances in Campeonato Paulista)	2	7	2
Ponte Preta	2009	Série B	26	7	-		-		-		-		26	7
Mirassol	2010	-	-		-		-		-		18	6	18	6
Criciúma	2010	Série C	12	1	-		-		-		-		12	1
Criciúma	2012	Série B	17	3	-		-		-		-		17	3
Criciúma	2013	Série A	35	11	-		-		2	0	18 (Note: Appearances in Campeonato Catarinense)	10	55	21
Criciúma	Total		64	15	0	0	0	0	2	0	18	10	84	25
Grêmio (loan)	2011	Série A	6	0	-		-		4	0	7 (Note: Appearances in Campeonato Gaúcho)	1	17	1
ABC (loan)	2011	Série B	18	8	-		-		-		-		18	8
Itumbiara (loan)	2012	-	-		-		-		-		16 (Note: Appearances in Campeonato Goiano)	5	16	5
Gamba Osaka	2014	J1 League	26	5	6	2	7	1	-		-		39	8
Gamba Osaka	2015	J1 League	20	1	0	0	4	0	10	3	2 (Note: One appearance in Japanese Super Cup, One appearance in Suruga Bank Championship)	0	36	4
Gamba Osaka	Total		46	6	6	2	11	1	10	3	2	0	75	12
Figueirense	2016	Série A	25	3	0	0	-		1	0	1 (Note: Appearances in Suruga Bank Championship)	0	27	3
Ponte Preta	2017	Série A	10	0	2	1	-		2	0	15 (Note: Appearances in Campeonato Paulista)	0	29	0
Ventforet Kofu	2017	J1 League	12	6	0	0	0	0	-		-		12	6
Ventforet Kofu	2018	J2 League	16	5	1	0	1	0	-		-		18	5
Ventforet Kofu	Total		28	11	1	0	1	0	0	0	0	0	30	11
FC Tokyo	2018	J1 League	18	3	0	0	0	0	-		-		18	3
Beijing BSU	2019	China League One	15	3	0	0	-		-		-		15	3
Career total			256	56	9	3	12	1	19	3	84	24	380	87

== Honours ==
=== Club ===
Gamba Osaka

- J1 League: 2014
- J.League Cup: 2014
- Emperor's Cup: 2014, 2015
- Japanese Super Cup – 2015
