= Shingo Akamine =

Japanese footballer (born 1983)

Shingo Akamine 赤嶺 真吾
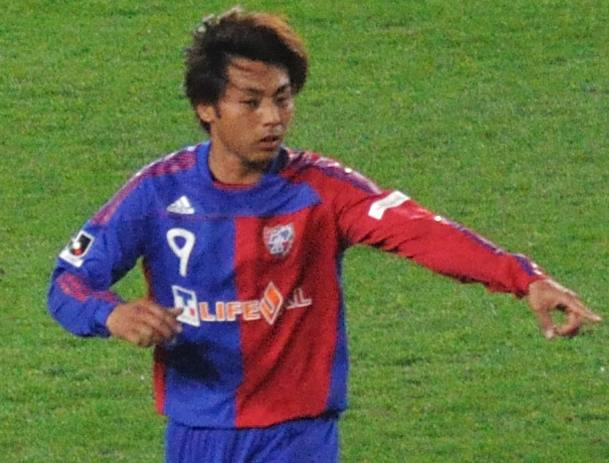
- Akamine playing

Personal information
- Full name: Shingo Akamine
- Date of birth: 8 December 1983 (age 42)
- Place of birth: Naha, Okinawa, Japan
- Height: 1.80 m (5 ft 11 in)
- Position: Forward

Youth career
- 1999–2001: Kagoshima Commercial High School
- 2002–2005: Komazawa University

Senior career*
Years	Team	Apps	(Gls)
2006–2010	FC Tokyo	101	(24)
2010–2014	Vegalta Sendai	132	(44)
2015–2016	Gamba Osaka	13	(0)
2016	→ Fagiano Okayama (loan)	41	(4)
2017–2020	Fagiano Okayama	111	(13)
2021	FC Ryukyu	27	(3)
Total		425	(88)
Medal record
FC Tokyo
Winner	J.League Cup	2009
Vegalta Sendai
Runner-up	J1 League	2012
Gamba Osaka
Runner-up	J1 League	2015
Runner-up	J.League Cup	2015
Winner	Emperor's Cup	2015
- * Club domestic league appearances and goals

Shingo Akamine (赤嶺 真吾, Akamine Shingo; born 8 December 1983) is a Japanese former footballer who played as a forward.

== Career ==
Akamine made his debut for Vegalta against Gamba Osaka on 14 August 2010. He scored his first goal for the club against Omiya Ardija on 22 August 2010.

Akamine made his debut for Gamba against Ventforet Kofu on 22 March 2015.

Akamine made his debut for Fagiano against Renofa Yamaguchi on 28 February 2016. He scored his first goal for the club on 3 May 2016, in the 66th minute against Yokohama F. Marinos.

Akamine made his debut for Ryukyu against Júbilo Iwata on 28 February 2021. He scored his first goal for the club against Thespakusatsu Gunma on 14 March 2021.

== Club stats ==
Updated to end of 2018 season.

Club performance			League		Cup		League Cup		Continental		Other^{1}		Total	
Season	Club	League	Apps	Goals	Apps	Goals	Apps	Goals	Apps	Goals	Apps	Goals	Apps	Goals
Japan			League		Emperor's Cup		League Cup		AFC				Total	
2005	FC Tokyo	J1	0	0	0	0	1	0	-		-		1	0
2006	FC Tokyo	J1	16	3	0	0	3	0	-		-		19	3
2007	FC Tokyo	J1	15	4	1	0	4	2	-		-		20	6
2008	FC Tokyo	J1	30	12	4	3	6	3	-		-		40	18
2009	FC Tokyo	J1	28	5	3	1	9	1	-		-		40	7
2010	FC Tokyo	J1	12	0	-		4	1	-		-		16	1
Total			101	24	8	4	27	7	-		-		136	35
2010	Vegalta Sendai	J1	15	4	0	0	-		-		-		15	4
2011	Vegalta Sendai	J1	31	14	3	0	3	0	-		-		37	14
2012	Vegalta Sendai	J1	30	14	2	0	5	1	-		-		37	15
2013	Vegalta Sendai	J1	26	3	1	0	2	0	4	0	-		33	3
2014	Vegalta Sendai	J1	30	9	0	0	3	1	-		-		33	10
Total			132	44	6	0	13	2	4	0	-		155	46
2015	Gamba Osaka	J1	13	0	0	0	2	0	4	0	2	0	21	0
Total			13	0	0	0	2	0	4	0	2	0	21	0
2016	Fagiano Okayama	J2	41	4	0	0	-		-		2	1	43	5
2017	Fagiano Okayama	J2	22	10	0	0	-		-		-		22	10
2018	Fagiano Okayama	J2	36	2	0	0	-		-		-		36	2
Total			99	16	0	0	-		-		2	1	101	17
Career total			345	84	14	4	42	9	8	0	4	1	413	98

^{1} = Japanese Super Cup, Suruga Bank Championship and J2 League Promotion Play-Off appearances.
