= Masatoshi Kushibiki =

Japanese footballer (born 1993)

Masatoshi Kushibiki 櫛引 政敏
Personal information
- Full name: Masatoshi Kushibiki
- Date of birth: 29 January 1993 (age 33)
- Place of birth: Aomori, Aomori, Japan
- Height: 1.86 m (6 ft 1 in)
- Position: Goalkeeper

Team information
- Current team: Reilac Shiga FC
- Number: 21

Youth career
- 2008–2010: Aomori Yamada High School

Senior career*
| Years | Team | Apps | (Gls) |
| 2011–2017 | Shimizu S-Pulse | 59 | (0) |
| 2015 | → J. League U-22 (loan) | 5 | (0) |
| 2016 | → Kashima Antlers (loan) | 0 | (0) |
| 2017 | → Fagiano Okayama (loan) | 6 | (0) |
| 2018–2021 | Montedio Yamagata | 87 | (0) |
| 2022–2024 | Thespa Gunma | 113 | (0) |
| 2025– | Reilac Shiga FC | 21 | (0) |

International career
| 2012 | Japan U-20 | 4 | (0) |
| 2016 | Japan U-23 | 1 | (0) |
Medal record
Shimizu S-Pulse
| Runner-up | J.League Cup | 2012 |
Kashima Antlers
| Winner | J1 League | 2016 |
| Winner | Emperor's Cup | 2016 |
Representing Japan
AFC U-23 Championship
| Gold medal – first place | 2016 Qatar |
- * Club domestic league appearances and goals as of 23 August 2026

Masatoshi Kushibiki (櫛引 政敏, Kushibiki Masatoshi; born 29 January 1993) is a Japanese professional footballer who plays as a goalkeeper for Reilac Shiga FC.

== Club career ==
Born in the Aomori Prefecture, Kushibiki made his debut for Shimizu S-Pulse of the J1 League on 20 March 2013 in the J.League Cup against Ventforet Kofu in which he started and played the whole 90 minutes as Shimuzu drew the match 1–1.

== National team career ==
In August 2016, Kushibiki was elected Japan U-23 national team for 2016 Summer Olympics. At this tournament, he played 1 match against Nigeria in first match.

== Career statistics ==
Updated to end of 2018 season.

Appearances and goals by club, season and competition
| Club | Season | League | | | Emperor's Cup | | J.League Cup | | Total | |
| Club | Season | Division | Apps | Goals | Apps | Goals | Apps | Goals | Apps | Goals |
|---|---|---|---|---|---|---|---|---|---|---|
| Shimizu S-Pulse | 2011 | J. League Division 1 | 0 | 0 | 0 | 0 | 0 | 0 | 0 | 0 |
| Shimizu S-Pulse | 2012 | J. League Division 1 | 0 | 0 | 0 | 0 | 0 | 0 | 0 | 0 |
| Shimizu S-Pulse | 2013 | J. League Division 1 | 20 | 0 | 2 | 0 | 5 | 0 | 27 | 0 |
| Shimizu S-Pulse | 2014 | J. League Division 1 | 29 | 0 | 4 | 0 | 5 | 0 | 38 | 0 |
| Shimizu S-Pulse | 2015 | J1 League | 10 | 0 | 1 | 0 | 2 | 0 | 13 | 0 |
| Kashima Antlers | 2016 | J1 League | 0 | 0 | 0 | 0 | 3 | 0 | 3 | 0 |
| Fagiano Okayama | 2017 | J2 League | 6 | 0 | 2 | 0 | - | | 8 | 0 |
| Montedio Yamagata | 2018 | J2 League | 24 | 0 | 0 | 0 | - | | 24 | 0 |
| Career total | | | 89 | 0 | 9 | 0 | 15 | 0 | 113 | 0 |
