= Kota Sugiyama =

Japanese footballer

Kota Sugiyama 杉山 浩太
Personal information
- Full name: Kota Sugiyama
- Date of birth: January 24, 1985 (age 41)
- Place of birth: Shizuoka, Shizuoka, Japan
- Height: 1.77 m (5 ft 9 1/2 in)
- Position: Midfielder

Youth career
- 2000–2002: Shimizu S-Pulse

Senior career*
Years	Team	Apps	(Gls)
2003–2017	Shimizu S-Pulse	149	(6)
2008–2009	→Kashiwa Reysol (loan)	34	(2)
Total		183	(8)
Medal record
Shimizu S-Pulse
Runner-up	J.League Cup	2012
Runner-up	Emperor's Cup	2005
Runner-up	Emperor's Cup	2010
Kashiwa Reysol
Runner-up	Emperor's Cup	2008
- * Club domestic league appearances and goals

Kota Sugiyama (杉山 浩太, Sugiyama Kōta; born January 24, 1985) is a Japanese former football player.

== Club career ==
Sugiyama was born in Shizuoka on January 24, 1985. He joined Shimizu S-Pulse from youth team in 2003. He played as defensive midfielder. In 2008, he moved to Kashiwa Reysol on loan. He returned to S-Pulse in 2010. Although in 2010, he could hardly play in the match for injury, his opportunity to play increased from 2011. He could hardly play in the match from 2016 and retired end of 2017 season.

== National team career ==
In September 2001, Sugiyama was selected Japan U-17 national team for 2001 U-17 World Championship, but he did not play in the match.

== Club statistics ==
Appearances and goals by club, season and competition
Club	Season	League			Emperor's Cup		J.League Cup		AFC		Total	
Club	Season	Division	Apps	Goals	Apps	Goals	Apps	Goals	Apps	Goals	Apps	Goals
Shimizu S-Pulse	2003	J1 League	5	0	4	0	0	0	1	0	10	0
Shimizu S-Pulse	2004	J1 League	16	2	1	0	3	1	—		20	3
Shimizu S-Pulse	2005	J1 League	14	2	0	0	4	0	—		18	2
Shimizu S-Pulse	2006	J1 League	15	0	0	0	3	0	—		18	0
Shimizu S-Pulse	2007	J1 League	11	0	0	0	5	1	—		16	1
Shimizu S-Pulse	Total		61	4	5	0	15	2	1	0	82	6
Kashiwa Reysol (loan)	2008	J1 League	12	1	3	0	2	0	—		17	1
Kashiwa Reysol (loan)	2009	J1 League	22	1	1	0	2	0	—		25	1
Kashiwa Reysol (loan)	Total		34	2	4	0	4	0	0	0	42	2
Shimizu S-Pulse	2010	J1 League	0	0	1	0	1	0	—		2	0
Shimizu S-Pulse	2011	J1 League	10	0	3	1	2	0	—		15	1
Shimizu S-Pulse	2012	J1 League	20	0	2	0	8	2	—		30	2
Shimizu S-Pulse	2013	J1 League	30	1	3	0	2	0	—		35	1
Shimizu S-Pulse	2014	J1 League	16	1	1	1	4	0	—		21	2
Shimizu S-Pulse	2015	J1 League	9	0	1	0	3	0	—		13	0
Shimizu S-Pulse	2016	J2 League	2	0	2	0	—		—		4	0
Shimizu S-Pulse	2017	J1 League	1	0	0	0	5	0	—		6	0
Shimizu S-Pulse	Total		88	2	13	2	25	2	0	0	126	6
Career total			183	8	22	2	44	4	1	0	250	14
