= 2012 Shimizu S-Pulse season =

Shimizu S-Pulse
2012 season
- Chairman: Iwao Hayakawa
- Manager: Afshin Ghotbi
- J. League Division 1: –
- Emperor's Cup: –
- J. League Cup: –
Home colours	Away colours

The 2012 Shimizu S-Pulse season was Shimizu S-Pulse's 20th consecutive season in J.League Division 1. Shimizu S-Pulse also competed in the 2012 Emperor's Cup and 2012 J.League Cup.

== Competitions ==
=== J. League ===
==== League table ====
Pos	Team	Pld	W	D	L	GF	GA	GD	Pts
7	Nagoya Grampus	34	15	7	12	46	47	−1	52
8	Kawasaki Frontale	34	14	8	12	51	50	+1	50
9	Shimizu S-Pulse	34	14	7	13	39	40	−1	49
10	FC Tokyo	34	14	6	14	47	44	+3	48
11	Kashima Antlers	34	12	10	12	50	43	+7	46

Updated to match(es) played on 1 December 2012. Source: J.League Division 1
Rules for classification: 1) points; 2) goal difference; 3) number of goals scored.

==== Matches ====
10 March 2012 1	Nagoya Grampus	1–0	Shimizu S-Pulse	Toyota Stadium
Saturday 14:04	Kennedy 33' (pen.)	Report		Attendance: 24,316; Referee: Nishimura

17 March 2012 2	Shimizu S-Pulse	2–1	Sanfrecce Hiroshima	OUTSOURCING Stadium Nihondaira
Saturday 15:04	Brosque 9'; Takagi 51'	Report	87' Chiba	Attendance: 13,231; Referee: Kimura

24 March 2012 3	Kashiwa Reysol	2–1	Shimizu S-Pulse	Kashiwa Hitachi Stadium
Saturday 19:04	Masushima 81', 86'	Report	38' Iwashita	Attendance: 12,209; Referee: Yoshida

31 March 2012 4	Shimizu S-Pulse	1–0	Consadole Sapporo	OUTSOURCING Stadium Nihondaira
Saturday 18:34	Takagi 49'	Report		Attendance: 14,216; Referee: Takayama

7 April 2012 5	Vissel Kobe	0–1	Shimizu S-Pulse	Home's Stadium Kobe
Saturday 15:00	Takagi (yellow card) 90+1'	Summary	Iwashita (yellow card) 30'; Brosque 82'	Attendance: 12,709; Referee: (Japan) Itaru Hirose

14 April 2012 6	Shimizu S-Pulse	3–2	Júbilo Iwata	OUTSOURCING Stadium Nihondaira
Saturday 17:00	Takagi 45+1'; Omae 48', 88'; Muramatsu (yellow card) 50'; Jymmy (yellow card) 55'	Summary	Cho Byung-Kuk 13'; Chiyotanda (yellow card) 68'; Yamamoto 90+4'	Attendance: 16,334; Referee: (Japan) Nobutsugu Murakami

22 April 2012 7	Gamba Osaka	3–1	Shimizu S-Pulse	Osaka Expo '70 Stadium
Sunday 20:00	Takei 20'; Leandro 27' (pen.); Sato (yellow card) 57' (goal) 81'	Summary	Hayashi (yellow card) 26'; Lee Ki-Je (yellow card) 42'; Ono (yellow card) 54'; Brosque 90+3'	Attendance: 8,548; Referee: (Japan) Tomohiro Inoue

28 April 2012 8	F.C. Tokyo	0–1	Shimizu S-Pulse	Ajinomoto Stadium
Saturday 14:00	Takahashi (yellow card) 50'	Summary	Jymmy Dougllas França (yellow card) 5' (yellow-red card) 56'; Brosque (yellow card) 24' (yellow-red card) 73'; Jong-a-Pin (yellow card) 45+1'; Ono (yellow card) 49'; Lee Ki-Je (yellow card) 53'; Yoshida (yellow card) 65'; Takagi 77'	Attendance: 22,405; Referee: (Japan) Yuichi Nishimura

3 May 2012 9	Shimizu S-Pulse	3–0	Kashima Antlers	OUTSOURCING Stadium Nihondaira
Thursday 20:00	Ito 5'; Takagi 72'; Omae 75'	Summary	Koroki (yellow card) 45+1'; Iwamasa (yellow card) 50'	Attendance: 18,393; Referee: (Japan) Yoshiro Imamura

6 May 2012 10	Vegalta Sendai	0–1	Shimizu S-Pulse	Yurtec Stadium Sendai
Sunday 14:00		Summary	Omae 40' (yellow card) 53'; Jong-a-Pin (yellow card) 57' (yellow-red card) 68'; Takagi (yellow card) 62'; Kobayashi (yellow card) 75'	Attendance: 18,525; Referee: (Japan) Ryuji Sato

12 May 2012 11	Shimizu S-Pulse	1–1	Cerezo Osaka	OUTSOURCING Stadium Nihondaira
Saturday 16:30	Iwashita (yellow card) 74'; Brosque 90+6'	Summary	Kakitani 15'; Kurogi (yellow card) 69'	Attendance: 15,891; Referee: (Japan) Jumpei Iida

19 May 2012 12	Urawa Red Diamonds	1–0	Shimizu S-Pulse	Saitama Stadium 2002
Saturday 16:30	Abe 42'; Umesaki (yellow card) 72'	Summary	Brosque (yellow card) 20' (yellow-red card) 54'; Takagi (yellow card) 62'	Attendance: 35,877; Referee: (Japan) Yudai Yamamoto

26 May 2012 13	Shimizu S-Pulse	0–0	Yokohama F. Marinos	OUTSOURCING Stadium Nihondaira
Saturday 15:00	Kang Song-Ho (yellow card) 31'	Summary	Dutra (yellow card) 28'	Attendance: 16,556; Referee: (Japan) Nobutsugu Murakami

16 June 2012 14	Albirex Niigata	1–0	Shimizu S-Pulse	Tohoku Electric Power Big Swan Stadium
Saturday 20:00	Kim Jin-Su (yellow card) 5'; Fujita 39'; Michael (yellow card) 61'; Bruno Lopes (yellow card) 69'; Higashiguchi (yellow card) 89'	Summary	Sugiyama (yellow card) 27'; Tsujio (yellow card) 59'	Attendance: 23,797; Referee: (Japan) Minoru Tojo

23 June 2012 15	Shimizu S-Pulse	1–1	Sagan Tosu	OUTSOURCING Stadium Nihondaira
Saturday 19:00	Omae 26' (pen.)	Summary	Kim Min-Woo (yellow card) 27'; Yeo Sung-Hye (yellow card) 48'; Ikeda 57'; Mizunuma (yellow card) 86'; Toyoda (yellow card) 90+3'	Attendance: 17,696; Referee: (Japan) Tomohiro Inoue

=== J. League Cup ===
4 April 2012 Group B	Shimizu S-Pulse	1–0	Albirex Niigata	OUTSOURCING Stadium Nihondaira
Wednesday 19:04	Kobayashi 16'	Report		Attendance: 7,479; Referee: Iemoto

=== Emperor's Cup ===
8 September 2012 Round 2	Shimizu S-Pulse	5–0	Arterivo Wakayama	Shizuoka City
13:00	Shirasaki 2', 25', 80'; Ito 68'; Satoru Kashiwase 90+1'	Report		Stadium: Outsourcing Stadium Nihondaira; Attendance: 2,864; Referee: Kenji Ogiya

10 October 2012 Round 3	Shimizu S-Pulse	–	Tokyo Verdy	Shizuoka City
19:00				Stadium: Outsourcing Stadium Nihondaira
