= 2010 Shimizu S-Pulse season =

Shimizu S-Pulse
2010 season
- Manager: Kenta Hasegawa
- Stadium: Outsourcing Stadium Nihondaira
- J. League 1: 6th
- Emperor's Cup: Runners-up
- J. League Cup: Semifinals
- Top goalscorer: Jungo Fujimoto (13); Shinji Okazaki (13)

The 2010 S-Pulse season was S-Pulse's nineteenth season in existence and their eighteenth season in the J1 League. The club also competed in the Emperor's Cup and the J.League Cup. The team finished the season sixth in the league.

== Competitions ==
| Competitions | Position |
|---|---|
| J. League 1 | 6th / 18 clubs |
| Emperor's Cup | Runners-up |
| J. League Cup | Semifinals |

=== J. League 1 ===
| Pos | Team | Pld | W | D | L | GF | GA | GD | Pts | Qualification or relegation |
|---|---|---|---|---|---|---|---|---|---|---|
| 4 | Kashima Antlers | 34 | 16 | 12 | 6 | 51 | 31 | +20 | 60 | Qualification for 2011 AFC Champions League group stage (Note: Kashima Antlers qualified as 2010 Emperor's Cup winners.) |
| 5 | Kawasaki Frontale | 34 | 15 | 9 | 10 | 61 | 47 | +14 | 54 | |
| 6 | Shimizu S-Pulse | 34 | 15 | 9 | 10 | 60 | 49 | +11 | 54 | |
| 7 | Sanfrecce Hiroshima | 34 | 14 | 9 | 11 | 45 | 38 | +7 | 51 | |
| 8 | Yokohama F. Marinos | 34 | 15 | 6 | 13 | 43 | 39 | +4 | 51 | |

Updated to match(es) played on December 4, 2010. Source: J.League Division 1
Rules for classification: 1) points; 2) goal difference; 3) number of goals scored.

== Player statistics ==
| No. | Pos. | Player | D.o.B. (Age) | Height / Weight | J. League 1 | | Emperor's Cup | | J. League Cup | | Total | |
| No. | Pos. | Player | D.o.B. (Age) | Height / Weight | Apps | Goals | Apps | Goals | Apps | Goals | Apps | Goals |
|---|---|---|---|---|---|---|---|---|---|---|---|---|
| 1 | GK | Kaito Yamamoto | July 10, 1985 (aged 24) | cm / kg | 0 | 0 | | | | | | |
| 2 | DF | Arata Kodama | October 8, 1982 (aged 27) | cm / kg | 15 | 0 | | | | | | |
| 3 | DF | Naoaki Aoyama | July 18, 1986 (aged 23) | cm / kg | 0 | 0 | | | | | | |
| 4 | DF | Kosuke Ota | July 23, 1987 (aged 22) | cm / kg | 28 | 1 | | | | | | |
| 5 | DF | Keisuke Iwashita | September 24, 1986 (aged 23) | cm / kg | 20 | 1 | | | | | | |
| 6 | MF | Kota Sugiyama | January 24, 1985 (aged 25) | cm / kg | 0 | 0 | | | | | | |
| 7 | MF | Teruyoshi Ito | August 31, 1974 (aged 35) | cm / kg | 16 | 1 | | | | | | |
| 8 | MF | Takuma Edamura | November 16, 1986 (aged 23) | cm / kg | 12 | 3 | | | | | | |
| 9 | FW | Yuichiro Nagai | February 14, 1979 (aged 31) | cm / kg | 14 | 1 | | | | | | |
| 10 | MF | Jungo Fujimoto | March 24, 1984 (aged 25) | cm / kg | 32 | 13 | | | | | | |
| 11 | FW | Kazuki Hara | January 5, 1985 (aged 25) | cm / kg | 10 | 2 | | | | | | |
| 13 | MF | Akihiro Hyodo | May 12, 1982 (aged 27) | cm / kg | 33 | 4 | | | | | | |
| 14 | MF | Jumpei Takaki | September 1, 1982 (aged 27) | cm / kg | 5 | 0 | | | | | | |
| 15 | DF | Shinji Tsujio | December 23, 1985 (aged 24) | cm / kg | 17 | 0 | | | | | | |
| 16 | MF | Takuya Honda | April 17, 1985 (aged 24) | cm / kg | 31 | 1 | | | | | | |
| 17 | MF | Masaki Yamamoto | August 24, 1987 (aged 22) | cm / kg | 20 | 2 | | | | | | |
| 18 | FW | Frode Johnsen | March 17, 1974 (aged 35) | cm / kg | 33 | 8 | | | | | | |
| 19 | FW | Yu Kijima | May 18, 1986 (aged 23) | cm / kg | 0 | 0 | | | | | | |
| 20 | FW | Shun Nagasawa | August 25, 1988 (aged 21) | cm / kg | 1 | 0 | | | | | | |
| 21 | GK | Yohei Nishibe | December 1, 1980 (aged 29) | cm / kg | 32 | 0 | | | | | | |
| 22 | FW | Genki Omae | December 10, 1989 (aged 20) | cm / kg | 13 | 3 | | | | | | |
| 23 | FW | Shinji Okazaki | April 16, 1986 (aged 23) | cm / kg | 31 | 13 | | | | | | |
| 24 | MF | Yuki Nagahata | May 2, 1989 (aged 20) | cm / kg | 0 | 0 | | | | | | |
| 25 | DF | Daisuke Ichikawa | May 14, 1980 (aged 29) | cm / kg | 21 | 0 | | | | | | |
| 26 | DF | Yasuhiro Hiraoka | May 23, 1986 (aged 23) | cm / kg | 27 | 2 | | | | | | |
| 27 | DF | Tomonobu Hiroi | January 11, 1985 (aged 25) | cm / kg | 4 | 0 | | | | | | |
| 28 | MF | Ryo Takeuchi | March 8, 1991 (aged 18) | cm / kg | 0 | 0 | | | | | | |
| 29 | GK | Kempei Usui | May 15, 1987 (aged 22) | cm / kg | 0 | 0 | | | | | | |
| 30 | MF | Shinji Ono | September 27, 1979 (aged 30) | cm / kg | 30 | 2 | | | | | | |
| 31 | GK | Yohei Takeda | June 30, 1987 (aged 22) | cm / kg | 4 | 0 | | | | | | |
| 32 | FW | Atomu Nabeta | May 1, 1991 (aged 18) | cm / kg | 0 | 0 | | | | | | |
| 33 | DF | Eddy Bosnar | April 29, 1980 (aged 29) | cm / kg | 22 | 3 | | | | | | |
| 36 | FW | Sho Ito | July 24, 1988 (aged 21) | cm / kg | 2 | 0 | | | | | | |

== Other pages ==
- (in Japanese) J. League official site
