= 2011 Shimizu S-Pulse season =

Shimizu S-Pulse
2011 season
- Manager: Afshin Ghotbi
- J. League Division 1: 10th
- Emperor's Cup: Quarter-finals
- J. League Cup: Second round
Home colours	Away colours

The 2011 Shimizu S-Pulse season was Shimizu S-Pulse's twentieth season in existence and nineteenth consecutive season in J. League Division 1. The team also competed in the 2011 J.League Cup, and the 2011 Emperor's Cup.

== Competitions ==
=== J. League ===
==== Table ====
Pos	Team	Pld	W	D	L	GF	GA	GD	Pts
8	Júbilo Iwata	34	13	8	13	53	45	+8	47
9	Vissel Kobe	34	13	7	14	44	45	−1	46
10	Shimizu S-Pulse	34	11	12	11	42	51	−9	45
11	Kawasaki Frontale	34	13	5	16	52	53	−1	44
12	Cerezo Osaka	34	11	10	13	67	53	+14	43

Updated to match(es) played on December 3, 2011. Source: J.League Division 1
Rules for classification: 1st points; 2nd goal differential; 3rd goals scored; 4th head-to-head results; 5th disciplinary points; 6th draw. If two clubs are tied for first place, both clubs will be declared.

==== Matches ====
5 March 2011 Round 1	Kashiwa Reysol	3–0	Shimizu S-Pulse	Kashiwa Hitachi Stadium
Saturday 19:04	Wagner 21', Park 65', Leandro 68'	Report		Attendance: 10,390; Referee: Sato

==== Results by round ====
Round	1	2	3	4	5	6	7	8	9	10	11	12	13	14	15	16	17	18	19	20	21	22	23	24	25	26	27	28	29	30	31	32	33	34
Ground	A																																	
Result	L																																	
Position	17																																	

Updated to match(es) played on 6 March 2011. Source: "World-Football.net".
A = Away; H = Home; W = Win; D = Draw; L = Loss

=== Emperor's Cup ===
2011-10-08 Second round	Shimizu S-Pulse	2–0	FC Gifu Second	Outsourcing Stadium Nihondaira, Shizuoka City
13:00	Takeuchi 44'; Omae 45+1'	Report		Attendance: 3,648; Referee: Yoshiro Imamura

2011-11-16 Third round	Shimizu S-Pulse	5–0	Gainare Tottori	Outsourcing Stadium Nihondaira, Shizuoka City
19:00	Iwashita 27'; Takahara 45+3'; Sugiyama 70'; Nagai 79'; Yamamoto 81'	Report		Attendance: 3,618; Referee: Hiromichi Oka

2011-12-17 Fourth round	Shimizu S-Pulse	2–0	JEF United Chiba	Outsourcing Stadium Nihondaira, Shizuoka City
15:00	Brosque 49'; Ito 62'	Report		Attendance: 6,855; Referee: Hiroyuki Kimura

2011-12-24 Quarter-finals	Cerezo Osaka	2–2 (a.e.t.) (6–5 p)	Shimizu S-Pulse	Nagai Stadium, Osaka
13:00	Kim Bo-Kyung 11'; Kiyotake 93'	Report	Ono 23'; Takagi 103'	Attendance: 8,252; Referee: Hajime Matsuo
	Penalties
	Kiyotake (penalty scored); Kim Bo-Kyung (penalty scored); Kuaata (penalty scored); Maruhashi (penalty scored); Bando (penalty missed); Yamaguchi (penalty scored); Komatsu (penalty scored)		(penalty scored) Omae; (penalty scored) Brosque; (penalty scored) Ito; (penalty missed) Iwashita; (penalty scored) Bosnar; (penalty scored) Takagi; (penalty missed) Yamamoto
