= Makoto Kakuda =

Japanese footballer

Makoto Kakuda 角田 誠
Personal information
- Full name: Makoto Kakuda
- Date of birth: 10 July 1983 (age 43)
- Place of birth: Uji, Kyoto, Japan
- Height: 1.80 m (5 ft 11 in)
- Positions: Defender; midfielder

Youth career
- 1996–2001: Kyoto Purple Sanga

Senior career*
Years	Team	Apps	(Gls)
2001–2003	Kyoto Purple Sanga	55	(0)
2004–2007	Nagoya Grampus Eight	47	(5)
2006	→ Kyoto Purple Sanga (loan)	18	(1)
2007–2010	Kyoto Sanga FC	118	(5)
2011–2014	Vegalta Sendai	106	(8)
2015	Kawasaki Frontale	14	(0)
2015–2018	Shimizu S-Pulse	59	(2)
2019–2020	V-Varen Nagasaki	54	(2)
2021	Porvenir Asuka	4	(0)
Total		417	(21)

International career
2003	Japan U-20	4	(0)

Managerial career
- 2024–2025: Reilac Shiga
- 2026–: Reilac Shiga
Medal record
Kyoto Sanga FC
Winner	Emperor's Cup	2002
Vegalta Sendai
Runner-up	J1 League	2012
Representing Japan
AFC U-19 Championship
Silver medal – second place	2002 Qatar
- * Club domestic league appearances and goals as of end of 2021 season

Makoto Kakuda (角田 誠, Kakuda Makoto; born 10 July 1983) is a Japanese football manager and former player who play as a Defender. He currently manager of J3 League club, Reilac Shiga.

== Playing career ==
Kakuda was born in Uji on 10 July 1983. He joined J2 League club Kyoto Purple Sanga (later Kyoto Sanga FC) from youth team in 2001. He debuted in May and Sanga was promoted to J1 League end of 2001 season. He became a regular player as left back of three back defence from 2002 and Sanga won the champions in 2002 Emperor's Cup first major title in the club history. However, Sanga finished at the bottom place in 2003 season and was relegated to J2.

In 2004, Kakuda moved to J1 club Nagoya Grampus Eight. He played many matches as defensive midfielder and right-side midfielder not only defender.

In May 2006, Kakuda was loaned to Kyoto Purple Sanga which was returned to J1 from 2006 season. He mainly played many matches as right side back. However, Sanga finished at the bottom place and was relegated to J2 again.

In 2007, Kakuda returned to Nagoya Grampus Eight. However, he moved to Kyoto Sanga FC in March. He played as regular player as centre back and Sanga won the 3rd place in 2007 season. In J1 from 2008 season, although he lost his regular position, he played many matches as defender and defensive midfielder. However Sanga finished at the 17th place in 2010 season and was relegated to J2.

In 2011, Kakuda moved to Vegalta Sendai. Although 2011 Tōhoku earthquake and tsunami occurred in Sendai immediately after the opening 2011 season, Kakuda played as regular defensive midfielder and Vegalta finished at the 4th place which is best results in the club history. In 2012 season, Vegalta won the 2nd place and qualified for 2013 AFC Champions League. Although the club results were sluggish from 2013, he played many matches as defensive midfielder until 2014.

In 2015, Kakuda moved to Kawasaki Frontale. Although he played all 14 matches as regular center back until May, he could not play at all in the match from June.

In August 2015, Kakuda moved to Shimizu S-Pulse. Although he played many matches as centre back, S-Pulse was relegated to J2 end of 2015 season first time in the club history. In 2016 season, S-Pulse won the 2nd place and was promoted to J1 in a year. However, he could hardly play in the match in 2018.

In 2019, Kakuda moved to V-Varen Nagasaki which was relegated to J2 from 2019 season.

== National team career ==
In November 2003, Kakuda was selected Japan U-20 national team for 2003 World Youth Championship. At this tournament, he played 4 matches as left back of three back defence.

== Managerial career ==
On 31 July 2024, Kakuda became official first manager of Reilac Shiga for mid 2024 season. On 14 December 2025, Kakuda was brought his club secure promotion to J3 League for the first time in their history from next season after draw against Azul Claro Numazu 1–1 and won aggregate 4–3 and ended 17 years in fourth tier.

== Career statistics ==
=== Club ===
As of the end 2021 season.

Club performance			League		Cup		League Cup		Continental		Total	
Season	Club	League	Apps	Goals	Apps	Goals	Apps	Goals	Apps	Goals	Apps	Goals
Japan			League		Emperor's Cup		J.League Cup		AFC		Total	
2001	Kyoto Purple Sanga	J.League Div 2	8	0	1	0	0	0	-		9	0
2002	Kyoto Purple Sanga	J.League Div 1	22	0	5	0	5	0	-		32	0
2003	Kyoto Purple Sanga	J.League Div 1	25	0	0	0	3	0	-		28	0
2003	Total		55	0	6	0	8	0	-		69	0
2004	Nagoya Grampus Eight	J.League Div 1	22	4	1	1	6	0	-		29	5
2005	Nagoya Grampus Eight	J.League Div 1	22	1	1	0	3	1	-		26	2
2006	Nagoya Grampus Eight	J.League Div 1	3	0	0	0	1	0	-		4	0
2006	Total		47	5	2	1	10	1	-		59	7
2006	Kyoto Purple Sanga	J.League Div 1	18	1	1	0	1	0	-		20	1
2006	Total		18	1	1	0	1	0	-		20	1
2007	Nagoya Grampus Eight	J.League Div 1	0	0	0	0	0	0	-		0	0
2007	Total		0	0	0	0	0	0	-		0	0
2007	Kyoto Sanga FC	J.League Div 2	41	0	1	0	-		-		42	0
2008	Kyoto Sanga FC	J.League Div 1	24	1	2	0	3	0	-		29	1
2009	Kyoto Sanga FC	J.League Div 1	29	0	2	0	4	1	-		35	1
2010	Kyoto Sanga FC	J.League Div 1	24	4	1	1	6	0	-		31	5
2010	Total		118	5	13	1	6	1	-		137	7
2011	Vegalta Sendai	J.League Div 1	29	2	1	0	4	1	-		34	3
2012	Vegalta Sendai	J.League Div 1	28	0	1	0	6	1	-		35	1
2013	Vegalta Sendai	J.League Div 1	26	5	4	0	1	0	3	0	34	5
2014	Vegalta Sendai	J.League Div 1	23	1	1	0	4	0	-		28	1
2014	Total		106	8	15	2	7	0	3	0	131	10
2015	Kawasaki Frontale	J1 League	14	0	0	0	3	0	-		17	0
2015	Total		14	0	0	0	3	0	-		17	0
2015	Shimizu S-Pulse	J1 League	12	0	0	0	0	0	-		12	0
2016	Shimizu S-Pulse	J2 League	23	1	1	0	-		-		24	1
2017	Shimizu S-Pulse	J1 League	19	1	2	1	2	0	-		23	2
2018	Shimizu S-Pulse	J1 League	5	0	0	0	5	0	-		10	0
2018	Total		59	2	7	0	3	1	-		69	3
2019	V-Varen Nagasaki	J2 League	29	1	1	0	-				30	1
2020	V-Varen Nagasaki	J2 League	25	1	0	0	-				25	1
2020	Total		54	2	1	0	-				55	2
2021	Porvenir Asuka	Kansai Soccer League Div 1	4	0	1	0	-				5	0
2021	Total		4	0	1	0	-				5	0
Career total			475	23	27	3	57	4	3	0	562	30

== Managerial statistics ==
As of the end 2025 season.

Team	From	To	Record				
Team	From	To	G	W	D	L	Win %
Reilac Shiga	31 July 2024	present	43	24	10	9	55.81
Total			43	24	10	9	55.81

== Honours ==
=== Manager ===
Reilac Shiga

- J3/JFL Play-off winner: 2025
