= Yutaka Takagi =

Japanese baseball player (born 1958)

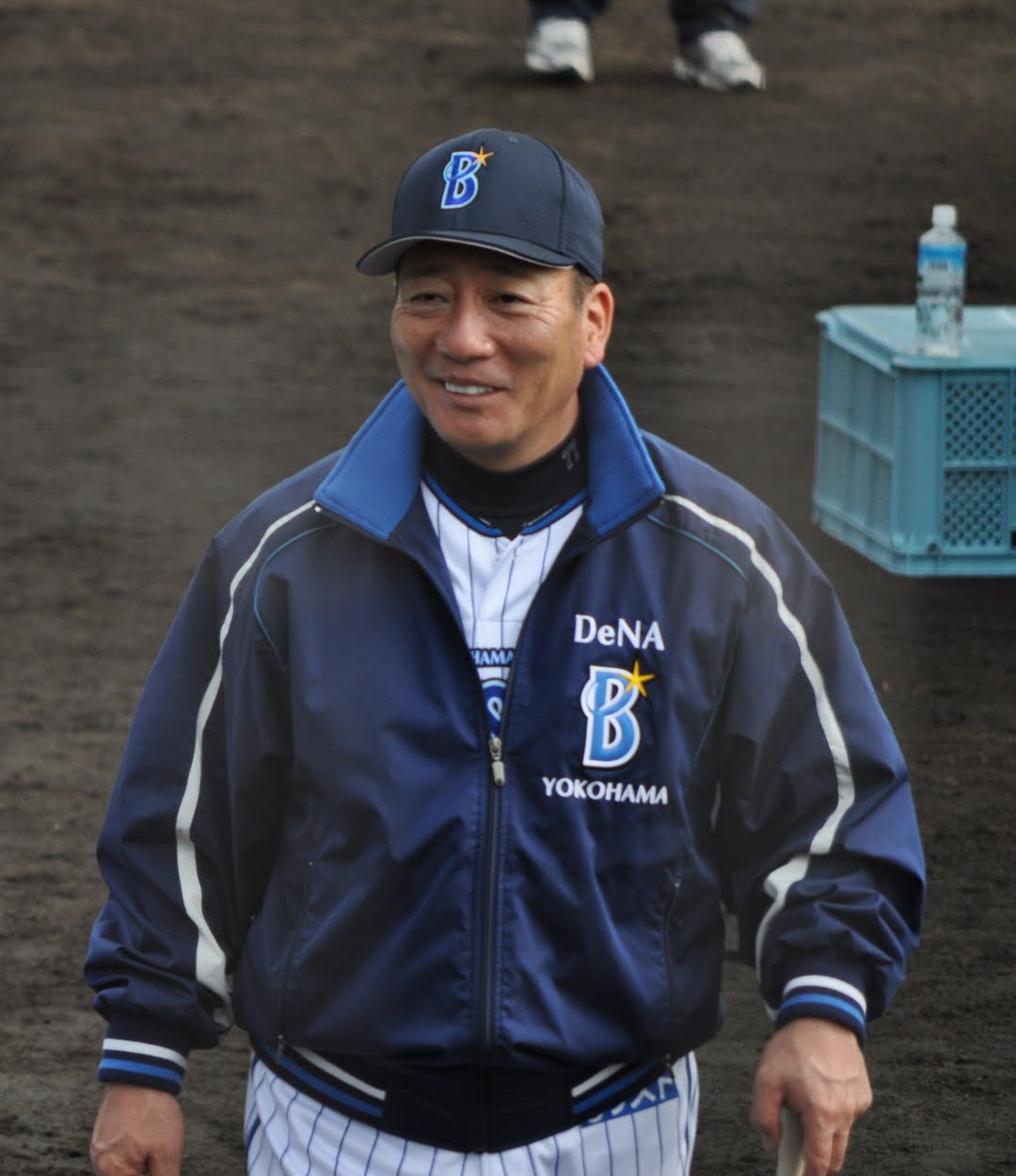
- Infielder / Coach
- Born: October 22, 1958 (age 67); Hōfu, Yamaguchi, Japan
- Batted: Left Threw: Right

NPB debut
- April 9, 1981, for the Yokohama Taiyō Whales

Last NPB appearance
- July 16, 1994, for the Nippon-Ham Fighters

NPB statistics (through 1994)
- Batting average: .297
- Home runs: 88
- Hits: 1716
- Stats at Baseball Reference

Teams
- As player: Yokohama Taiyō Whales/Yokohama BayStars (1981–1993); Nippon-Ham Fighters (1994); As coach: Yokohama BayStars/Yokohama DeNA BayStars (2001, 2012–2013)

Career highlights and awards
- 8× NPB All-Star (1983–1986, 1988, 1990–1992); 1× NPB All-Star Game MVP (1985 Game 1); 1× Central League stolen base champion (1984); 3× Best Nine Award (1985, 1990, 1991); 1× Diamond Glove Award (1983)

Yutaka Takagi (高木 豊, Yutaka Takagi; born October 22, 1958 in Hōfu, Yamaguchi, Japan) is a professional Japanese baseball player.

== Family ==
He has three sons of the football player. His eldest son Toshiyuki is playing in Cerezo Osaka, Yoshiaki are currently playing in Albirex Niigata, and his third son Daisuke is playing in Gamba Osaka.
