= Shinji Ono =

Japanese footballer (born 1979)

Shinji Ono 小野 伸二
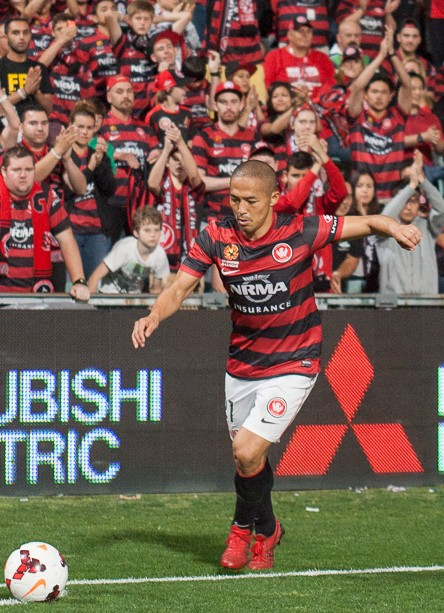
- Ono playing for Western Sydney Wanderers in 2013

Personal information
- Full name: Shinji Ono
- Date of birth: 27 September 1979 (age 47)
- Place of birth: Numazu, Shizuoka, Japan
- Height: 1.75 m (5 ft 9 in)
- Position: Midfielder

Youth career
- Imazawa Boys SC
- 1992–1994: Imazawa Junior High School
- 1995–1997: Shimizu Shogyo High School

Senior career*
Years	Team	Apps	(Gls)
1998–2001	Urawa Reds	79	(20)
2001–2005	Feyenoord	112	(19)
2006–2007	Urawa Reds	53	(8)
2008–2009	VfL Bochum	29	(0)
2010–2012	Shimizu S-Pulse	70	(8)
2012–2014	Western Sydney Wanderers	47	(9)
2014–2019	Hokkaido Consadole Sapporo	62	(2)
2019–2020	FC Ryukyu	23	(0)
2021–2023	Hokkaido Consadole Sapporo	6	(0)
Total		481	(66)

International career
1995	Japan U-17	3	(0)
1999	Japan U-20	6	(2)
2004	Japan Olympic (O.P.)	3	(2)
1998–2008	Japan	56	(6)
Medal record
Men's football
Representing Japan
AFC Asian Cup
Winner	2000 Lebanon
FIFA Confederations Cup
Runner-up	2001 Korea/Japan
- * Club domestic league appearances and goals

Shinji Ono (小野 伸二, Ono Shinji; born 27 September 1979) is a Japanese former professional footballer who played as a midfielder.

He started his senior career with J1 League side Urawa Reds before moving Dutch side Feyenoord in 2001 where he won the UEFA Cup in 2002. He returned to Urawa Reds in 2006 where he won the 2006 J League title in his first season back at the club and the 2007 AFC Champions League in his second season. He moved to Bundesliga side Bochum in January 2008 but made limited appearances due to injuries. He signed for Shimizu S-Pulse in January 2010. He subsequently played for Western Sydney Wanderers, Hokkaido Consadole Sapporo and Ryukyu before retiring in 2023.

He earned 56 caps for the Japan national team. He was part of the squads for the 1998, 2002 and 2006 World Cups.

== Career ==
=== Urawa Reds ===
Ono grew up in the Shizuoka Prefecture and began his professional career with Urawa Reds in the J1 League in 1998. The same year, he became the youngest Japanese player to play at 1998 World Cup, at age 18. He caught the attention of foreign clubs with his performance at the 1999 World Youth Championship in Nigeria, where he captained the Japanese Under-20 side that reached the final. But later that year, he suffered a severe knee injury in a qualification match for the 2000 Olympics with Japan's Under-23 side, forcing him to miss the rest of the season and Olympic qualifying.

=== Feyenoord ===
After a strong performance at the 2001 Confederations Cup, Ono moved to Feyenoord of the Dutch Eredivisie in 2001. In his first season, he helped Feyenoord win the 2002 UEFA Cup, making him the first Japanese in history to win a European trophy. However, a string of injuries kept him sidelined for long periods. After he missed the majority of 2004–05, the club sold him. His stint at the Rotterdam based club is highly rated and Dutch midfielder Wesley Sneijder said "Shinji Ono is the toughest opponent I've ever faced".

=== Urawa Reds return ===
On 13 January 2006, Ono returned to the J1 League, signing a three-year deal with his former club Urawa Reds.

=== Bochum ===
In the 2008 January transfer window, Ono returned to Europe, signing with Bundesliga's Bochum. On 3 February 2008, Ono made his Bundesliga debut in an away game against Werder Bremen, and he had two assists that helped Bochum with their first ever win over Bremen at Weserstadion. Ono suffered injuries in the following two years in Bochum, and could only play 34 matches in which he gave four assists for the club. In the winter break of 2009–10, Ono requested a return to Japan for personal reasons. Different Japanese clubs were interested in the midfielder. Bochum allowed him to leave under the condition that they could find a successor.

=== Shimizu S-Pulse ===
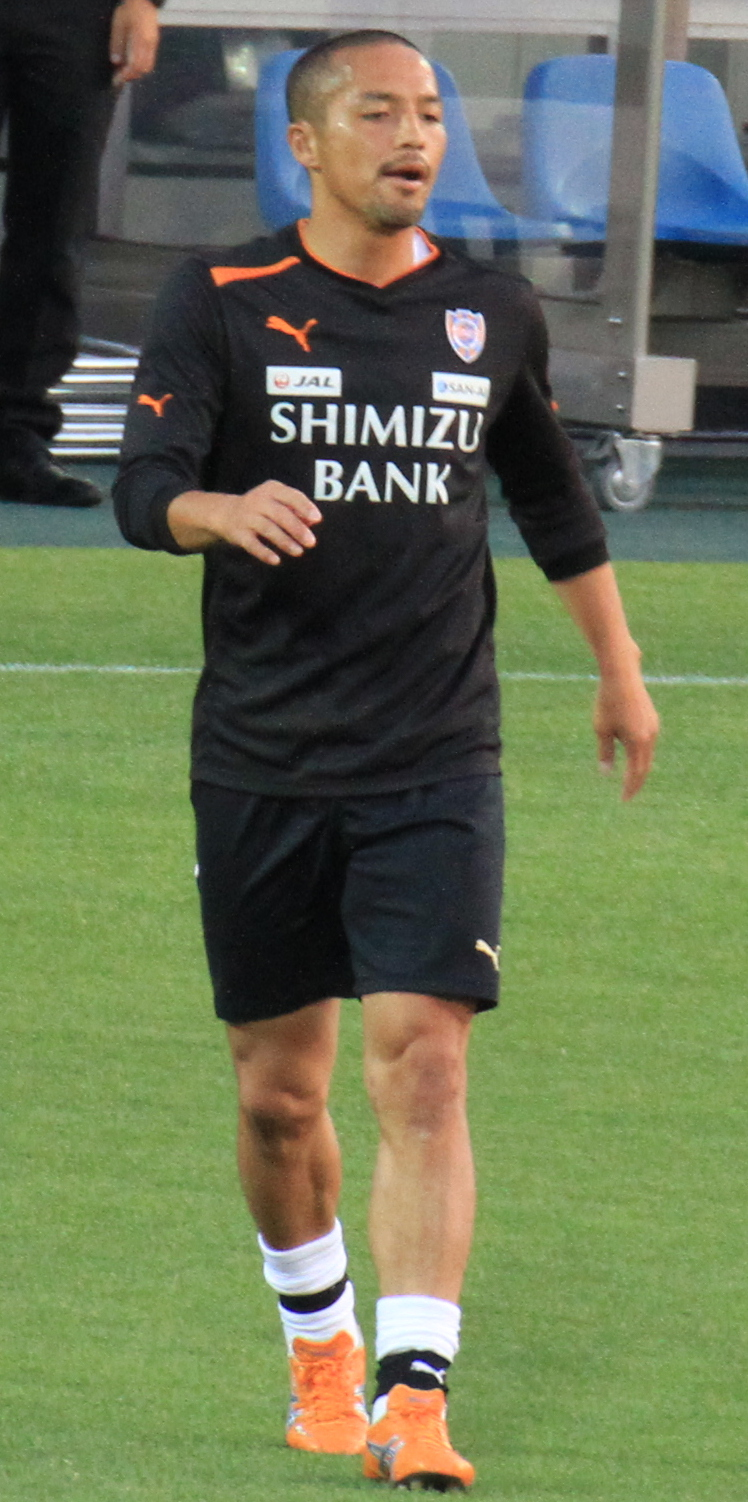
Shinji Ono playing for Shimizu S-Pulse in 2012.

On 9 January 2010, Ono returned to his native Shizuoka Prefecture by signing for Shimizu S-Pulse. The transfer fee were rumored to be €300,000 for the midfielder whose contract in Bochum expired in the summer of 2010. In an interview he declared that the main reason for his transfer was his wish to reunite with his wife and children, who were still living in Japan.

=== Western Sydney Wanderers ===
On 28 September 2012, it was announced that Shinji Ono had signed with new A-League club Western Sydney Wanderers on a two-year deal as the club's marquee player. The Wanderers were offered former German international Michael Ballack but preferred to sign Ono. He made his debut for the Wanderers on 6 October, in a scoreless draw against Central Coast Mariners, in the first game of the season.

Ono scored his first goal for the club with a penalty in round 10 against Brisbane Roar. Ono scored two stunning goals to help the Wanderers beat Melbourne Victory 2–1 in round 14 on 1 January 2013. On 16 January 2014, the club announced that Ono would return to Japan at the end of the A-League season. Ono will link up with J2 League club Consadole Sapporo to play out the remainder of the season in Japan as the club chases promotion to the J1 League. On 4 May 2014, Ono played his last A-League game for the Wanderers, in a 2–1 Grand Final loss to Brisbane Roar, in what was to be the Wanderers' second successive Grand Final defeat.

=== Hokkaido Consadole Sapporo ===
Following the expiration of his contract and his desire to see his family, Ono joined Consadole Sapporo (later Hokkaido Consadole Sapporo) in May 2014.

=== FC Ryukyu ===
On 5 August 2019, Ono signed with J2 League club FC Ryukyu. In December 2020, he left Ryuku after failing to reach a contract extension agreement.

=== Return to Hokkaido Consadole Sapporo ===
On 1 January 2021, it was announced that he would return to his former club, Hokkaido Consadole Sapporo, as a permanent transfer. His uniform number is 44, the same as when he belonged to Sapporo last time.

On 9 June of the same year, in the second round of the Emperor's Cup at Sony Sendai, he scored his first goal in an official match in four years with a direct free kick. This goal made him the oldest player to score in the Emperor's Cup (41 years and 255 days old).

On 28 January 2022, it was announced that he had signed a lifetime contract with Hokkaido Consadole Sapporo. Ono commented, "I consider Hokkaido to be my second home. I don't know how I will end my active career, but I hope to continue to give back to the club by sharing my experiences". In addition, Hokkaido Consadole Sapporo representative director and GM Daikatsu Mikami expressed his intention to prioritize Ono's wishes, saying, "I will let him decide whether he wants to be a coach or join the front desk".

On 27 September 2023, the day he celebrated his 44th birthday, which is the same as his jersey number, he posted on his Instagram a message posted on the Hokkaido Consadole Sapporo official website: "I have a report to share with you all. 39th anniversary of my first encounter with soccer. My feet, which have been my companions for many years, are telling me it's time to give them a rest, so I've decided to end my career as a professional soccer player at the end of this season. There are still a few games left in the season. However, I will continue to prepare as well as possible so that I can be involved in the game as much as possible. I ask for your support until the end". Shinji Ono announced that he will retire as an active player after the 2023 season.

On 3 December 2023, at the 2023 J1 league season final round, Ono played his last professional game against Urawa. He said goodbye to his colleague and every fan.

== International career ==
When fit, Ono was an ever-present member of the Japan national team. He made his full international debut on 1 April 1998 against South Korea in a friendly. After his appearance in the 1998 World Cup, he was a key member of the Japanese squad in the 2002 FIFA World Cup. He has represented Japan at every age level starting with the U-16 team, and was one of three overage selections at the 2004 Olympics in Athens. Injuries limited Ono to just one appearance in the final round of the qualification for the 2006 FIFA World Cup and missed the Confederations Cup in 2003 and 2005. He played in his third World Cup finals in Germany.

== Style of play ==
Known as Tensai (天才, Japanese for Genius), Ono is one of the biggest stars in Asian football, known for his vision, technique and superb passing. Although his primary position is attacking midfielder, he can play anywhere in the midfield, including defensive midfield and either wing.

== Career statistics ==
=== Club ===
As of 27 September 2023

Appearances and goals by club, season and competition
Club	Season	League			National cup		League cup		Continental		Other (Note: Includes UEFA Champions League preliminary rounds, UEFA Super Cup, Japanese Super Cup, FIFA Club World Cup and A-League Finals Series.)		Total	
Club	Season	Division	Apps	Goals	Apps	Goals	Apps	Goals	Apps	Goals	Apps	Goals	Apps	Goals
Urawa Reds	1998	J.League	27	9	2	0	0	0	–		–		29	9
Urawa Reds	1999	J.League Division 1	14	2	2	0	0	0	–		–		16	2
Urawa Reds	2000	J.League Division 2	24	7	2	1	–		–		–		26	8
Urawa Reds	2001	2001 J.League Division 1	14	2	0	0	4	3	–		–		18	5
Urawa Reds	Total		79	20	6	1	4	3	–		–		89	24
Feyenoord	2001–02	Eredivisie	30	3	2	1	–		12	2	–		44	6
Feyenoord	2002–03	Eredivisie	29	7	2	0	—		5	0	3	2	39	9
Feyenoord	2003–04	Eredivisie	24	2	1	0	—		4	0	—		29	2
Feyenoord	2004–05	Eredivisie	25	7	2	0	—		7	1	—		34	8
Feyenoord	2005–06	Eredivisie	4	0	0	0	—		1	0	—		5	0
Feyenoord	Total		112	19	7	1	—		29	1	3	2	151	23
Urawa Reds	2006	J.League Division 1	28	5	4	3	1	1	–		1	0	34	9
Urawa Reds	2007	J.League Division 1	25	3	0	0	2	1	8	2	2	0	37	6
Urawa Reds	Total		53	8	4	3	3	2	8	2	3	0	71	15
VfL Bochum	2007–08	Bundesliga	12	0	–		–		–		–		12	0
VfL Bochum	2008–09	Bundesliga	8	0	2	0	—		–		—		10	0
VfL Bochum	2009–10	Bundesliga	9	0	1	0	—		–		—		10	0
VfL Bochum	Total		29	0	3	0	—		—		—		32	0
Shimizu S-Pulse	2010	J.League Division 1	30	2	5	1	6	1	–		–		41	4
Shimizu S-Pulse	2011	J.League Division 1	26	6	2	1	2	1	–		–		30	8
Shimizu S-Pulse	2012	J.League Division 1	14	0	0	0	0	0	–		–		14	0
Shimizu S-Pulse	Total		70	8	7	2	8	2	—		—		85	12
Western Sydney Wanderers	2012–13	A-League	24	7	–		–		–		2	1	26	8
Western Sydney Wanderers	2013–14	A-League	23	2	–		–		6	1	2	0	31	3
Western Sydney Wanderers	Total		47	9	—		—		6	1	4	1	57	11
Hokkaido Consadole Sapporo	2014	J2 League	7	0	0	0	—		—		—		7	0
Hokkaido Consadole Sapporo	2015	J2 League	17	2	2	0	—		—		—		19	2
Hokkaido Consadole Sapporo	2016	J2 League	15	0	2	0	—		—		—		17	0
Hokkaido Consadole Sapporo	2017	J1 League	16	0	1	0	7	1	—		—		24	1
Hokkaido Consadole Sapporo	2018	J1 League	7	0	2	0	3	0	—		—		12	0
Hokkaido Consadole Sapporo	2019	J1 League	0	0	0	0	2	0	—		—		2	0
Hokkaido Consadole Sapporo	Total		62	2	7	0	12	1	—		—		81	3
FC Ryukyu	2019	J2 League	9	0	0	0	—		—		—		9	0
FC Ryukyu	2020	J2 League	14	0	0	0	—		—		—		14	0
FC Ryukyu	Total		23	0	0	0	0	0	0	0	0	0	23	0
Hokkaido Consadole Sapporo	2021	J1 League	4	0	2	1	5	0	—		—		11	1
Hokkaido Consadole Sapporo	2022	J1 League	1	0	1	0	0	0	—		—		2	0
Hokkaido Consadole Sapporo	2023	J1 League	1	0	2	0	0	0	—		—		3	0
Hokkaido Consadole Sapporo	Total		6	0	5	1	5	0	—		—		16	1
Career total			481	66	39	8	32	8	43	6	10	3	605	91

=== International ===
Appearances and goals by national team and year
National team	Year	Apps	Goals
Japan	1998	3	0
Japan	1999	0	0
Japan	2000	12	1
Japan	2001	9	1
Japan	2002	8	1
Japan	2003	5	0
Japan	2004	7	2
Japan	2005	2	0
Japan	2006	9	1
Japan	2007	0	0
Japan	2008	1	0
Total		56	6

Scores and results list Japan's goal tally first, score column indicates score after each Ono goal.

List of international goals scored by Shinji Ono
No.	Date	Venue	Opponent	Score	Result	Competition
1	14 October 2000	Sidon, Lebanon	Saudi Arabia	4–0	4–1	2000 AFC Asian Cup
2	31 May 2001	Niigata, Japan	Canada	1–0	3–0	2001 FIFA Confederations Cup
3	16 October 2002	Tokyo, Japan	Jamaica	1–0	1–1	Friendly
4	1 June 2004	Manchester, England	England	1–1	1–1	2004 FA Summer Tournament
5	8 September 2004	Kolkata, India	India	2–0	4–0	2006 FIFA World Cup qualification
6	22 February 2006	Yokohama, Japan	India	1–0	6–0	2007 AFC Asian Cup qualification

== Honours ==
Feyenoord

- UEFA Cup: 2001–02
- KNVB Cup: Runner-up 2002–03

Urawa Red Diamonds

- J.League Division 1: 2006
- Emperor's Cup: 2006
- Japanese Super Cup: 2006
- AFC Champions League: 2007

Western Sydney Wanderers

- A-League Premiership: 2012–13
- A-League Finals: Runner-up 2012–13

Japan

- AFC U-16 Championship: 1994
- AFC Asian Cup: 2000

Individual

- AFC Youth Championship Most Valuable Player: 1998
- AFC Youth Player of the Year: 1998
- J.League Rookie of the Year: 1998
- J.League Best XI: 1998
- FIFA World Youth Championship All-Star Team: 1999
- AFC Player of the Year: 2002
- J.League 30th Anniversary Team: 2023
