= 2012 J.League Cup =

Yamazaki Nabisco Cup

Tournament details
- Country: Japan
- Teams: 18

Final positions
- Champions: Kashima Antlers (5th title)
- Runners-up: Shimizu S-Pulse

Tournament statistics
- Matches played: 55
- Goals scored: 170 (3.09 per match)
- Top goal scorer: Yuya Osako (Kashima Antlers) 7 goals

The 2012 J.League Cup, also known as the 2012 J.League Yamazaki Nabisco Cup for sponsoring purposes, was the 37th edition of the most prestigious Japanese soccer league cup tournament and the 20th edition under the current J.League Cup format.

Kashima Antlers became the winners for two straight years and qualify for the 2013 Suruga Bank Championship.

== Format ==
Teams from the J.League Division 1 will take part in the tournament. FC Tokyo, Gamba Osaka, Kashiwa Reysol and Nagoya Grampus were given a bye to the quarter-finals due to qualification in the 2012 AFC Champions League. The remaining 14 teams started from the group stage, where they were divided into two groups of seven. The group winners and the runners-up of each group qualified for the quarter-final along with the four teams which qualified for the AFC Champions League.

== Group stage ==
=== Standings ===
==== Group A ====
Team	Pld	W	D	L	GF	GA	GD	Pts
Cerezo Osaka	6	4	0	2	15	7	+8	12
Vegalta Sendai	6	4	0	2	11	5	+4	12
Júbilo Iwata	6	4	0	2	10	11	−1	12
Urawa Red Diamonds	6	3	0	3	12	10	+2	9
Sagan Tosu	6	3	0	3	8	16	−8	9
Sanfrecce Hiroshima	6	1	1	4	8	11	−3	4
Kawasaki Frontale	6	1	1	4	7	11	−4	4

==== Group B ====
Team	Pld	W	D	L	GF	GA	GD	Pts
Shimizu S-Pulse	6	5	0	1	12	4	+8	15
Kashima Antlers	6	5	0	1	10	5	+5	15
Albirex Niigata	6	3	1	2	6	5	+1	10
Yokohama F. Marinos	6	1	2	3	7	9	−2	5
Omiya Ardija	6	1	2	3	7	10	−3	5
Consadole Sapporo	6	1	2	3	6	11	−5	5
Vissel Kobe	6	1	1	4	6	10	−4	4

=== Results ===
==== Group A ====
20 March 2012
Tuesday 15:01

Urawa Red Diamonds	1–0	Vegalta Sendai
Nagata 49'	Report

Saitama Stadium 2002
Attendance: 23,076
Referee: Okabe
20 March 2012
Tuesday 16:04

Sagan Tosu	2–1	Kawasaki Frontale
Okada 53'; Noda 65'	Report	78' Yajima

Best Amenity Stadium
Attendance: 4,613
Referee: Tojo
20 March 2012
Tuesday 19:04

Júbilo Iwata	2–1	Cerezo Osaka
Matsuura 59'; Maeda 88'	Report	38' Branquinho

Yamaha Stadium
Attendance: 8,036
Referee: Kimura

4 April 2012
Wednesday 19:03

Vegalta Sendai	2–0	Sagan Tosu
Matsushita 51'; Kakuda 62'	Report

Yurtec Stadium Sendai
Attendance: 7,236
Referee: Yoshida
4 April 2012
Wednesday 19:04

Júbilo Iwata	4–3	Urawa Red Diamonds
Maeda 7'; Chiyotanda 57'; Matsuura 77'; Yamada 82'	Report	34' Kojima; 45+1' (o.g.) Rodrigo Souto; 79' Takahashi

Yamaha Stadium
Attendance: 7,824
Referee: Ogiya
4 April 2012
Wednesday 19:04

Sanfrecce Hiroshima	1–1	Kawasaki Frontale
Sato 85'	Report	58' Jeci

Hiroshima Big Arch
Attendance: 6,413
Referee: Iida

18 April 2012
Wednesday 19:00

Kawasaki Frontale	3–1	Vegalta Sendai
Tasaka 45+1'; Kobayashi 45+3', 57'	Report	90' Muto

Kawasaki Todoroki Stadium
Attendance: 8,186
Referee: Matsuo
18 April 2012
Wednesday 19:04

Júbilo Iwata	1–0	Sanfrecce Hiroshima
Yamada 85'	Report

Yamaha Stadium
Attendance: 6,372
Referee: Tojo
18 April 2012
Wednesday 19:30

Urawa Red Diamonds	1–4	Cerezo Osaka
Yajima 42'	Report	11' Kiyotake; 45' Fujimoto; 49' Branquinho; 81' Bando

Saitama Stadium 2002
Attendance: 16,533
Referee: Sato

16 May 2012
Wednesday 19:00

Kawasaki Frontale	0–3	Urawa Red Diamonds
	Report	32' Kashiwagi; 57', 82' Ugajin

Kawasaki Todoroki Stadium
Attendance: 13,608
Referee: Murakami
16 May 2012
Wednesday 19:04

Cerezo Osaka	2–1	Sanfrecce Hiroshima
Branquinho 27'; Kim 90+5'	Report	30' Sato

KINCHO Stadium
Attendance: 6,397
Referee: Okabe
16 May 2012
Wednesday 19:04

Sagan Tosu	3–2	Júbilo Iwata
Inuzuka 12', 65'; Hayasaka 62'	Report	52' Matsuoka; 88' Yamada

Best Amenity Stadium
Attendance: 4,642
Referee: Sato

6 June 2012
Wednesday 19:00

Cerezo Osaka	3–2	Kawasaki Frontale
Kempes 47'; Kakitani 58', 86'	Summary	Kusukami 30'; Renatinho 68'

Nagai Ball Gall Field
Attendance: 6,855
Referee: Koichiro Fukushima
6 June 2012
Wednesday 19:00

Sanfrecce Hiroshima	1–3	Vegalta Sendai
Shimizu 24'	Summary	Nakahara 56', 76'; Wilson 65'

Hiroshima Big Arch
Attendance: 7,234
Referee: Minoru Tojo
6 June 2012
Wednesday 19:00

Sagan Tosu	2–1	Urawa Red Diamonds
Toyoda 52'; Mizunuma 80'	Report	Márcio Richardes 77'

Best Amenity Stadium
Attendance: 7,284
Referee: Kimura

9 June 2012
Saturday 16:00

Vegalta Sendai	1–0	Cerezo Osaka
Ryang Yong-Gi 63'	Summary

Yurtec Stadium Sendai
Attendance: 8,638
Referee: Yoshiro Imamura
9 June 2012
Saturday 16:00

Kawasaki Frontale	0–1	Júbilo Iwata
	Summary	Yamazaki 25'

Todoroki Athletics Stadium
Attendance: 7,970
Referee: Jumpei Iida
9 June 2012
Saturday 16:00

Sanfrecce Hiroshima	5–1	Sagan Tosu
Koji Morisaki 45+3', 90'; Satō 55' (pen.); Ishihara 78', 82'	Summary	Mizunuma 63'

Hiroshima Big Arch
Attendance: 10,132
Referee: Murakami

27 June 2012
Wednesday 19:00

Vegalta Sendai	4–0	Júbilo Iwata
Ota 23'; Wilson 56'; Akamine 69'; Watanabe 80'	Summary

Yurtec Stadium Sendai
Attendance: 9,865
Referee: Hiroyuki Kimura
27 June 2012
Wednesday 19:01

Urawa Red Diamonds	3–0	Sanfrecce Hiroshima
Despotović 43'; Noda 62'; Yajima 80'	Summary

Saitama Stadium 2002
Attendance: 14,022
Referee: Koichiro Fukushima
27 June 2012
Wednesday 19:00

Cerezo Osaka	5–0	Sagan Tosu
Ogihara 24'; Kim Bo-Kyung 45+4' (pen.); Kakitani 55', 71'; Fujimoto 90'	Summary

Kincho Stadium
Attendance: 7,280
Referee: Minoru Tojo

==== Group B ====
20 March 2012
Tuesday 13:04

Consadole Sapporo	0–1	Albirex Niigata
	Report	38' Mineiro

Sapporo Dome
Attendance: 7,487
Referee: Nakamura
20 March 2012
Tuesday 15:00

Kashima Antlers	2–0	Vissel Kobe
Osako 20'; Endo 45+1'	Report

Kashima Soccer Stadium
Attendance: 11,379
Referee: Matsuo
20 March 2012
Tuesday 16:00

Omiya Ardija	1–1	Yokohama F. Marinos
Carlinhos 15'	Report	84' Saitō

NACK5 Stadium Omiya
Attendance: 7,845
Referee: Yoshida

4 April 2012
Wednesday 19:00

Kashima Antlers	1–0	Omiya Ardija
Koroki 31'	Report

Kashima Soccer Stadium
Attendance: 6,515
Referee: Murakami
4 April 2012
Wednesday 19:04

Shimizu S-Pulse	1–0	Albirex Niigata
Kobayashi 16'	Report

OUTSOURCING Stadium Nihondaira
Attendance: 7,479
Referee: Iemoto
4 April 2012
Wednesday 19:33

Yokohama F. Marinos	1–2	Consadole Sapporo
Matsumoto 68'	Report	6' Oshima; 45+2' Sakaki

Nippatsu Mitsuzawa Stadium
Attendance: 7,148
Referee: Fukushima

18 April 2012
Wednesday 19:03

Consadole Sapporo	1–2	Kashima Antlers
Sakaki 16'	Report	85' Juninho; 90+4' Okamoto

Sapporo Dome
Attendance: 6,877
Referee: Okabe
18 April 2012
Wednesday 19:03

Albirex Niigata	1–0	Vissel Kobe
Hirai 27'	Report

Tohoku Denryoku Big Swan Stadium
Attendance: 8,158
Referee: Yoshida
18 April 2012
Wednesday 19:04

Shimizu S-Pulse	1–0	Yokohama F. Marinos
Brosque 76'	Report

OUTSOURCING Stadium Nihondaira
Attendance: 8,753
Referee: Kimura

16 May 2012
Wednesday 19:03

Omiya Ardija	1–1	Consadole Sapporo
Kim 53'	Report	88' Maeda

NACK5 Stadium Omiya
Attendance: 4,359
Referee: Yoshida
16 May 2012
Wednesday 19:04

Vissel Kobe	1–2	Shimizu S-Pulse
Matsumura 64'	Report	55' Kobayashi; 83' Takagi

HOME'S Stadium Kobe
Attendance: 3,778
Referee: Fukushima
16 May 2012
Wednesday 19:33

Yokohama F. Marinos	3–2	Kashima Antlers
Hyodo 36'; Saitō 83'; Oguro 86'	Report	58' Endo; 68' Juninho

NHK Spring Mitsuzawa Football Stadium
Attendance: 9,693
Referee: Iemoto

6 June 2012
Wednesday 19:00

Consadole Sapporo	0–4	Shimizu S-Pulse
	Summary	Kawai 2'; Lee Ki-Je 5'; Ishige 57'; Sugiyama 78'

Sapporo Dome
Attendance: 3,687
Referee: Toshimitsu Yoshida
6 June 2012
Wednesday 19:00

Omiya Ardija	1–0	Vissel Kobe
Aoki 31'	Summary	Bae Chun-Suk (red card) 70'

NACK5 Stadium Omiya
Attendance: 4,204
6 June 2012
Wednesday 19:00

Albirex Niigata	0–1	Kashima Antlers
	Summary	Osako 86'

Tohoku Electric Power Big Swan Stadium
Attendance: 9,986
Referee: Ryuji Sato

9 June 2012
Saturday 13:00

Yokohama F. Marinos	0–0	Albirex Niigata
	Summary

Nissan Stadium
Attendance: 5,345
Referee: Yudai Yamamoto
9 June 2012
Saturday 13:00

Shimizu S-Pulse	3–1	Omiya Ardija
Hiraoka 41'; Omae 72' (pen.); Shirasaki 88'	Summary	Hasegawa 36'; Fukaya (red card) 70'

Outsourcing Stadium Nihondaira
Attendance: 10,596
Referee: Yuichi Nishimura
9 June 2012
Saturday 13:00

Vissel Kobe	2–2	Consadole Sapporo
Ōkubo 12', 21'	Summary	Sakai 35'; Okamoto 38'

Home's Stadium Kobe
Attendance: 4,083
Referee: Kazuhiko Matsumura

27 June 2012
Wednesday 19:04

Kashima Antlers	2–1	Shimizu S-Pulse
Osako 75', 90' (pen.)	Summary	Ito 14'

Kashima Soccer Stadium
Attendance: 6,207
Referee: Masaaki Iemoto
27 June 2012
Wednesday 19:03

Albirex Niigata	4–3	Omiya Ardija
Kogure 62'; Hirai 73'; Suzuki 90', 90+4'	Summary	Shimizu 15', 49'; Watanabe 40'

Tohoku Electric Power Big Swan Stadium
Attendance: 7,664
Referee: Toshimitsu Yoshida
27 June 2012
Wednesday 19:04

Vissel Kobe	3–2	Yokohama F. Marinos
Komoto 9', 87'; Morioka 40'	Summary	Ono 37'; Kanai 80'

Home's Stadium Kobe
Attendance: 5,029
Referee: Antonio Arias

== Knock-out stage ==
All times are Japan Standard Time (UTC+9)

Quarterfinals
Nagoya Grampus	1	3	4
Shimizu S-Pulse	0	4	4
FC Tokyo	2	2	4
Vegalta Sendai	2	1	3
Kashiwa Reysol	3	2	5
Gamba Osaka	1	1	2
Cerezo Osaka	1	0	1
Kashima Antlers	2	3	5

Semifinals
Shimizu S-Pulse	1	3	4
FC Tokyo	2	0	2
Kashiwa Reysol	2	2	4
Kashima Antlers	3	2	5

Finals
Shimizu S-Pulse
Kashima Antlers

=== Quarter-finals ===
==== First leg ====
2012-07-25
19:00

Kashima Antlers	2–1	Cerezo Osaka
Iwamasa 22'; Koroki 25'		Kakitani 33'

Kashima Soccer Stadium, Kashima
Attendance: 6,203
Referee: Kevin Friend

2012-07-25
19:04

Vegalta Sendai	2–2	FC Tokyo
Tamura 32'; Wilson 50'		Watanabe 16'; Ishikawa 30'

Yurtec Stadium Sendai, Sendai
Attendance: 8,873
Referee: Darren Deadman

2012-07-25
19:04

Shimizu S-Pulse	0–1	Nagoya Grampus
		Yoshida 77'

Outsourcing Stadium Nihondaira, Shimizu, Shizuoka
Attendance: 6,719
Referee: Minoru Tojo

2012-07-25
19:03

Gamba Osaka	1–3	Kashiwa Reysol
Niwa 83'		Kudo 47'; Leandro Domingues 76', 90+5'

Expo '70 Commemorative Stadium, Suita, Osaka
Attendance: 7,083
Referee: Toshimitsu Yoshida

==== Second leg ====
2012-08-08
19:04

Kashiwa Reysol	2–1	Gamba Osaka
Leandro Domingues 17'; Kudo 60'		Sato 30'

Kashiwa Hitachi Stadium, Kashiwa, Chiba
Attendance: 6,910
Referee: Jumpei Iida

2012-08-08
19:04

Cerezo Osaka	0–3	Kashima Antlers
		Dutra 28'; Koroki 63'; Shibasaki 70'

Osaka Nagai Stadium, Osaka
Attendance: 9,133
Referee: Nobutsugu Murakami

2012-08-08
19:05

FC Tokyo	2–0	Vegalta Sendai
Ishikawa 81'; Watanabe 90+3'

Ajinomoto Stadium, Chōfu, Tokyo
Attendance: 10,573
Referee: Kenji Ogiya

2012-08-08
19:03

Nagoya Grampus	3–4	Shimizu S-Pulse
Tulio 54'; Fujimoto 76', 87'		Alex 42'; Jymmy Franca 69'; Senuma 88'; Takagi 90+3'

Mizuho Athletic Stadium, Nagoya
Attendance: 7,313
Referee: Ryuji Sato

=== Semifinals ===
==== First leg ====
2012-09-05
19:04

FC Tokyo	2–1	Shimizu S-Pulse
Kajiyama 35'; Lucas 80' (pen.)	(Report)	Tokunaga 23' (o.g.)

Ajinomoto Stadium, Chōfu, Tokyo
Attendance: 10,347
Referee: Toshimitsu Yoshida

2012-09-05
19:04

Kashima Antlers	3–2	Kashiwa Reysol
Osako 7', 69'; Renato 36'	(Report)	Barada 35'; Leandro Domingues 62'

Kashima Soccer Stadium, Kashima
Attendance: 9,115
Referee: Hajime Matsuo

==== Second leg ====
2012-10-13
14:00

Shimizu S-Pulse	3–0	FC Tokyo
Omae 26', 63', 90+6' (pen.)	Report

Outsourcing Stadium Nihondaira, Shimizu
Attendance: 12,155
Referee: Kenji Ogiya

2012-10-13
19:00

Kashiwa Reysol	2–2	Kashima Antlers
Jorge Wagner 37'; Neto Baiano 90+4'	Report	Dutra 12'; Osako 24'

Hitachi Kashiwa Soccer Stadium, Kashiwa
Attendance: 13,527
Referee: Yuichi Nishimura

=== Final ===
2012-11-03
13:05

Shimizu S-Pulse	1–2 (a.e.t.)	Kashima Antlers
Omae 77' (pen.)	Report	Shibasaki 73' (pen.), 93'

National Olympic Stadium, Shinjuku, Tokyo
Attendance: 45,228
Referee: Masaaki Iemoto

== Goalscorers ==
Rank	Name	Team	Goals
1	(Japan) Yuya Osako	Kashima Antlers	7
2	(Japan) Genki Omae	Shimizu S-Pulse	5
2	(Japan) Yoichiro Kakitani	Cerezo Osaka	5
4	(Brazil) Leandro Domingues	Kashiwa Reysol	4
