= Shinji Tsujio =

Japanese footballer

Shinji Tsujio 辻尾 真二
Personal information
- Full name: Shinji Tsujio
- Date of birth: 23 December 1985 (age 40)
- Place of birth: Sakai, Osaka, Japan
- Height: 1.80 m (5 ft 11 in)
- Position: Defender

Youth career
- 2001–2003: Hatsushiba Hashimoto High School

College career
Years	Team	Apps	(Gls)
2004–2007	Chuo University		

Senior career*
Years	Team	Apps	(Gls)
2008–2012	Shimizu S-Pulse	57	(1)
2012	→ Sanfrecce Hiroshima (loan)	5	(0)
2013	Oita Trinita	13	(0)
2014–2016	Zweigen Kanazawa	84	(7)
2017–2018	SC Sagamihara	61	(4)
Medal record
Shimizu S-Pulse
Runner-up	J.League Cup	2008
Runner-up	J.League Cup	2012
Runner-up	Emperor's Cup	2010
Sanfrecce Hiroshima
Winner	J1 League	2012
- * Club domestic league appearances and goals as of 23 February 2019

Shinji Tsujio (辻尾 真二, Tsujio Shinji; born 23 December 1985 in Sakai, Osaka) is a Japanese football player for SC Sagamihara.

== Career ==
Tsujio was a member of F.C. Tokyo's youth program, and after graduating from Chuo University he joined S-Pulse in 2008.

== Club statistics ==
Updated to 23 February 2019.

Club performance			League		Cup		League Cup		Total	
Season	Club	League	Apps	Goals	Apps	Goals	Apps	Goals	Apps	Goals
Japan			League		Emperor's Cup		League Cup		Total	
2008	Shimizu S-Pulse	J1 League	3	0	1	0	2	0	6	0
2009	Shimizu S-Pulse	J1 League	9	0	2	0	3	0	14	0
2010	Shimizu S-Pulse	J1 League	17	0	3	0	6	0	26	0
2011	Shimizu S-Pulse	J1 League	27	1	1	0	3	0	31	1
2012	Shimizu S-Pulse	J1 League	1	0	-		1	0	2	0
2012	Sanfrecce Hiroshima	J1 League	5	0	1	0	-		6	0
2013	Oita Trinita	J1 League	13	0	2	0	3	0	18	0
2014	Zweigen Kanazawa	J3 League	30	3	2	0	-		32	3
2015	Zweigen Kanazawa	J2 League	34	3	1	0	-		35	3
2016	Zweigen Kanazawa	J2 League	20	1	0	0	-		20	1
2017	SC Sagamihara	J3 League	32	2	-		-		32	2
2018	SC Sagamihara	J3 League	29	2	-		-		29	2
Career total			222	12	13	0	18	0	253	12
