= Kota Fujimoto =

Japanese footballer

Kota Fujimoto 藤本 康太
Personal information
- Full name: Kota Fujimoto
- Date of birth: 2 April 1986 (age 40)
- Place of birth: Kumamoto, Japan
- Height: 1.77 m (5 ft 10 in)
- Position: Centre back

Youth career
- 2002–2004: Kumamoto Kokufu High School

Senior career*
Years	Team	Apps	(Gls)
2005–2019	Cerezo Osaka	218	(13)
2016–2019	→ Cerezo Osaka U-23	8	(0)
Medal record
Cerezo Osaka
Winner	J.League Cup	2017
Winner	Emperor's Cup	2017
- * Club domestic league appearances and goals

Kota Fujimoto (藤本 康太, Fujimoto Kōta; born 2 April 1986 in Kumamoto) is a Japanese retired footballer he is the currently coach of J1 League club Cerezo Osaka.

== Career ==
Fujimoto played his entire professional career with Cerezo Osaka. He retired from football at the end of the 2019 season.

== Career statistics ==
Updated to 25 February 2019.

Club performance			League		Cup		League Cup		Continental		Other		Total	
Season	Club	League	Apps	Goals	Apps	Goals	Apps	Goals	Apps	Goals	Apps	Goals	Apps	Goals
Japan			League		Emperor's Cup		League Cup		AFC		Other^{1}		Total	
2005	Cerezo Osaka	J1 League	7	0	1	0	0	0	–		–		8	0
2006	Cerezo Osaka	J1 League	14	4	0	0	4	0	–		–		18	4
2007	Cerezo Osaka	J2 League	18	1	0	0	–		–		–		18	1
2008	Cerezo Osaka	J2 League	14	1	2	0	–		–		–		16	1
2009	Cerezo Osaka	J2 League	27	4	1	0	–		–		–		28	4
2010	Cerezo Osaka	J1 League	17	0	2	0	5	0	–		–		24	0
2011	Cerezo Osaka	J1 League	19	2	3	0	1	0	6	0	–		29	2
2012	Cerezo Osaka	J1 League	32	0	2	1	8	2	–		–		42	3
2013	Cerezo Osaka	J1 League	28	0	2	0	5	0	–		–		35	0
2014	Cerezo Osaka	J1 League	17	1	3	1	0	0	4	0	–		24	2
2015	Cerezo Osaka	J2 League	0	0	0	0	–		–		0	0	0	0
2016	Cerezo Osaka	J2 League	17	0	2	0	–		–		2	0	21	0
2017	Cerezo Osaka	J1 League	3	0	3	0	7	1	–		–		10	1
2018	Cerezo Osaka	J1 League	3	0	0	0	0	0	0	0	0	0	3	0
Career total			216	13	21	2	30	3	10	0	2	0	279	20

== Reserves performance ==
Last Updated: 25 February 2019

Club performance			League		Total	
Season	Club	League	Apps	Goals	Apps	Goals
Japan			League		Total	
2016	Cerezo Osaka U-23	J3	2	0	2	0
2018	Cerezo Osaka U-23	J3	1	0	1	0
Career total			3	0	3	0
