= Branquinho (footballer, born 1983) =

Brazilian footballer

Personal information
- Full name: Wellington Clayton Gonçalves dos Santos
- Date of birth: 2 January 1983 (age 43)
- Place of birth: São José do Rio Preto, Brazil
- Height: 1.72 m (5 ft 8 in)
- Positions: Winger; attacking midfielder

Senior career*
Years	Team	Apps	(Gls)
2006–2007	Rio Preto		
2008	Botafogo (SP)		
2008	Barueri		
2008–2009	Botafogo (SP)	17	(3)
2009	Ceará	1	(0)
2009–2010	Santo André	19	(8)
2010–2011	Atlético Paranaense	58	(5)
2012–2013	Cerezo Osaka	21	(1)
2012	→ Montedio Yamagata (loan)	13	(3)
2014	Bahia	15	(2)
2015	Oeste	5	(0)
2016	Santo André	22	(9)
2017	Red Bull Brasil	6	(1)
2018	Penapolense	15	(3)
2018	Atlético Tubarão	8	(0)
2019	Rio Preto		
2019	Taubaté		
2020	Barretos	11	(3)
2021	São José-SP	13	(3)
- * Club domestic league appearances and goals

Clayton Wellington Gonçalves dos Santos (born 2 January 1983), better known as Branquinho, is a Brazilian former professional footballer who played as an attacking midfielder.

== Career statistics ==
(Correct As of September 2022)

Career statistics by year, club and competition
Season	Club	Competition	Matches played	Goals	Yellow cards	Red cards	Minutes played
2009	Cearà Sporting Club	Campeonato Brasileiro Série B	1	-	-	-	16'
2009	Botafogo SP	Campeonato Paulista A1	11	3	1	-	1322'
2010	Atlético Paranaense	Campeonato Brasileiro Série A	31	5	2	-	2182'
2010	EC Santo André	Campeonato Brasileiro Série B	2	1	-	-	168'
2010	EC Santo André	Campeonato Paulista Série A1	17	7	1	-	1241'
2011	Atlético Paranaense	Campeonato Brasileiro Série A	17	-	1	-	629'
2011	Atlético Paranaense	Campeonato Paranaense	10	-	1	-	538'
2011	Atlético Paranaense	Copa do Brasil	4	-	1	-	231'
2011	Atlético Paranaense	Copa Sudamericana	1	-	-	-	90'
2012	Montedio Yamagata	J2 League	13	3	1	-	1007'
2012	Cerezo Osaka	J1 League	16	1	1	-	972'
2012	Cerezo Osaka	J-League cup	7	3	1	-	511'
2013	Cerezo Osaka	J1 League	5	-	1	-	210'
2013	Cerezo Osaka	J-League cup	1	-	-	-	46'
2014	EC Bahia	Copa do Nordeste	4	-	-	-	255'
2014	EC Bahia	Campeonato Baiano 1	3	1	-	-	130'
2014	EC Bahia	Campeonato Brasileiro Série A	12	1	2	-	468'
2014	EC Bahia	Copa do Brasil	4	1	1	-	112'
2014	EC Bahia	Copa Sudamericana	-	-	-	-	-
2015	Oeste Futebol Clube	Campeonato Brasileiro Série B	5	-	-	-	204'
2016	EC Santo André	Campeonato Paulista Série A2	22	9	4	-	1772'
2016	Red Bull Brasil	Copa Paulista	18	3	2	-	1461'
2017	Red Bull Brasil	Campeonato Paulista Série A2	6	1	-	-	249'
2018	Clube Atletico Penapolense	Campeonato Paulista Série A2	15	3	1	-	1137'
2018	Atletico Tubarão	Campeonato Brasileiro Série D	8	-	2	-	566'
2019	Rio Preto	Campeonato Paulista Série A3	5	1	-	-	373'
2019	Esporte Clube Taubaté	Copa Paulista	16	1	1	-	1044'
2020	Barretos Esporte Clube	Campeonato Paulista Série A3	11	3	1	-	930'
2021	São José EC	Campeonato Paulista Série A3	13	3	2	-	904'
		Total	278	50	27	-	18.768'
		Averages (per season)	21.3 matches	3.8 goals	2.0 yellow cards	-	1.443'

== Honours ==
- 2010 Runner-up team (EC Santo André) in Campeonato Paulista Série A1
- 2011 Runner-up team (Atlético Paranaense) in Campeonato Paranaense
- 2014 Winner team (EC Bahia) in Campeonato Baiano 1
- 2016 Winner team (EC Santo André) in Campeonato Paulista Série A2
