= Yoshiaki Takagi =

Japanese footballer (born 1992)

Yoshiaki Takagi 高木 善朗
Personal information
- Full name: Yoshiaki Takagi
- Date of birth: 9 December 1992 (age 33)
- Place of birth: Yokohama, Kanagawa, Japan
- Height: 1.68 m (5 ft 6 in)
- Position: Attacking midfielder

Team information
- Current team: BG Pathum United
- Number: 31

Youth career
- –2004: Azamino FC
- 2005–2009: Tokyo Verdy

Senior career*
Years	Team	Apps	(Gls)
2010–2011	Tokyo Verdy	43	(6)
2011–2013	FC Utrecht	34	(1)
2014–2016	Shimizu S-Pulse	13	(0)
2015–2016	→ Tokyo Verdy (loan)	55	(9)
2017	Tokyo Verdy	37	(7)
2018–2025	Albirex Niigata	233	(25)
2026	BG Pathum United	12	(1)

International career^{‡}
2008–2009	Japan U17	8	(1)
2010	Japan U19	3	(0)
- * Club domestic league appearances and goals as of 16 May 2026 ‡ National team caps and goals as of 29 June 2010

Yoshiaki Takagi (高木 善朗, Takagi Yoshiaki; born 9 December 1992) is a Japanese professional footballer who plays as an attacking midfielder for Thai League 1 club, BG Pathum United.

== Career ==
He is noted for being a free-kick specialist and emerging as a regular member at Tokyo Verdy in his debut season at the age of 17. Alongside Arsenal winger Ryo Miyaichi and FC Bayern Munich forward Takashi Usami, Takagi is considered part of what has been termed by the Japanese media as the "Platinum Generation."

== National team career ==
In October 2009, Takagi was elected Japan U-17 national team for 2009 U-17 World Cup. He played all 3 matches and scored a goal against Brazil in first match.

== Family ==
He comes from a sports family, with his father Yutaka being a former professional baseball player, notably for Yokohama BayStars, and brother Toshiyuki is also a professional footballer.

== Career statistics ==
=== Club ===
As of 27 November 2022.

Appearances and goals by club, season and competition
Club	Season	League			Cup		League Cup		Other		Total	
Club	Season	Division	Apps	Goals	Apps	Goals	Apps	Goals	Apps	Goals	Apps	Goals
Tokyo Verdy	2010	J2 League	33	5	1	0	–		–		34	5
Tokyo Verdy	2011	J2 League	10	1	0	0	–		–		10	1
Tokyo Verdy	Total		43	6	1	0	0	0	0	0	44	6
FC Utrecht	2011–12	Eredivisie	15	1	0	0	–		-		15	1
FC Utrecht	2012–13	Eredivisie	8	0	0	0	–		-		8	0
FC Utrecht	2013–14	Eredivisie	11	0	1	0	–		2 (Note: Appearances in the UEFA Europa League)	0	14	0
FC Utrecht	Total		34	1	1	0	0	0	2	0	243	6
Shimizu S-Pulse	2014	J1 League	9	0	5	3	3	0	–		17	3
Shimizu S-Pulse	2015	J1 League	4	0	0	0	4	1	–		8	1
Shimizu S-Pulse	Total		13	0	5	3	7	1	0	0	25	4
Tokyo Verdy (loan)	2015	J2 League	18	1	2	1	–		–		20	2
Tokyo Verdy (loan)	2016	J2 League	37	8	2	2	–		–		39	10
Tokyo Verdy	2017	J2 League	37	7	0	0	–		1 (Note: Appearance in J1/J2 play-off)	0	38	7
Tokyo Verdy	Total		92	16	4	3	0	0	1	0	97	19
Albirex Niigata	2018	J2 League	32	0	0	0	4	1	–		36	1
Albirex Niigata	2019	J2 League	33	2	0	0	–		–		33	2
Albirex Niigata	2020	J2 League	35	1	0	0	–		–		35	1
Albirex Niigata	2021	J2 League	42	10	0	0	–		–		42	10
Albirex Niigata	2022	J2 League	32	9	1	0	–		–		33	9
Albirex Niigata	Total		174	22	1	0	4	1	0	0	179	23
Career total			356	45	12	6	11	2	3	0	382	53

=== International ===
As of 29 June 2010

National team	Year	Apps	Goals
Japan U17
Japan U17	2008	4	0
Japan U17	2009	4	1
Japan U17	Total	8	1
Japan U19
Japan U19	2010	3	0
Japan U19	Total	3	0

International appearances and goals
#	Date	Venue	Opponent	Result	Goal	Competition
2008
	5 October	MHSK Stadium, Tashkent	Malaysia U16	4–0	0	2008 AFC U-16 Championship / Japan U16
	7 October	MHSK Stadium, Tashkent	United Arab Emirates U16	6–1	0	2008 AFC U-16 Championship / Japan U16
	12 October	MHSK Stadium, Tashkent	Saudi Arabia U16	2–0	0	2008 AFC U-16 Championship / Japan U16
	15 October	Pakhtakor Stadium, Tashkent	South Korea U16	1–2	0	2008 AFC U-16 Championship / Japan U16
2009
	19 June	Stade Municipal, Ouagadougou	Burkina Faso U17	1–0	0	Friendly / Japan U17
	24 October	Teslim Balogun Stadium, Lagos	Brazil U17	2–3	1	2009 FIFA U-17 World Cup / Japan U17
	27 October	Teslim Balogun Stadium, Lagos	Switzerland U17	3–4	0	2009 FIFA U-17 World Cup / Japan U17
	30 October	Teslim Balogun Stadium, Lagos	Mexico U17	0–2	0	2009 FIFA U-17 World Cup / Japan U17
2010
	20 June	Ekbatan Stadium Tehran, Tehran	Iran U19	2–1	0	Friendly / Japan U19
	27 June	Weifang Sports Center Stadium, Weifang	China PR U19	0–1	0	Friendly / Japan U19
	29 June	Weifang Sports Center Stadium, Weifang	China PR U19	2–1	0	Friendly / Japan U19

== Honours ==
Albirex Niigata

- J2 League : 2022

Individual

- J2 League Best XI: 2022
