= 2017 Shimizu S-Pulse season =

Shimizu S-Pulse
2017 season
- Manager: Shinji Kobayashi
- Stadium: IAI Stadium Nihondaira
- J1 League: 14th

2017 Shimizu S-Pulse season.

== J1 League ==
=== League table ===
Pos	Team	Pld	W	D	L	GF	GA	GD	Pts	Qualification or relegation
12	Vegalta Sendai	34	11	8	15	44	53	−9	41	
13	FC Tokyo	34	10	10	14	37	42	−5	40	
14	Shimizu S-Pulse	34	8	10	16	36	54	−18	34	
15	Sanfrecce Hiroshima	34	8	9	17	32	49	−17	33	
16	Ventforet Kofu (R)	34	7	11	16	23	39	−16	32	Relegation to 2018 J2 League

Source: Meiji Yasuda J1 League
Rules for classification: 1) Points; 2) Goal difference; 3) Goals scored
(R) Relegated

=== Match details ===
J1 League match details
Match	Date	Team	Score	Team	Venue	Attendance
1	2017.02.25	Shimizu S-Pulse	0-1	Vissel Kobe	IAI Stadium Nihondaira	17,861
2	2017.03.04	Sanfrecce Hiroshima	0-1	Shimizu S-Pulse	Edion Stadium Hiroshima	13,489
3	2017.03.11	Albirex Niigata	0-2	Shimizu S-Pulse	Denka Big Swan Stadium	31,014
4	2017.03.18	Shimizu S-Pulse	2-3	Kashima Antlers	IAI Stadium Nihondaira	16,951
5	2017.04.01	Júbilo Iwata	3-1	Shimizu S-Pulse	Shizuoka Stadium	40,491
6	2017.04.08	Kashiwa Reysol	0-2	Shimizu S-Pulse	Hitachi Kashiwa Stadium	9,432
7	2017.04.16	Shimizu S-Pulse	1-1	Omiya Ardija	IAI Stadium Nihondaira	16,277
8	2017.04.21	Kawasaki Frontale	2-2	Shimizu S-Pulse	Kawasaki Todoroki Stadium	17,358
9	2017.04.30	Shimizu S-Pulse	0-3	Vegalta Sendai	IAI Stadium Nihondaira	15,228
10	2017.05.05	Gamba Osaka	1-1	Shimizu S-Pulse	Suita City Football Stadium	31,948
11	2017.05.14	Shimizu S-Pulse	1-1	Sagan Tosu	IAI Stadium Nihondaira	14,172
12	2017.05.20	Urawa Reds	3-3	Shimizu S-Pulse	Saitama Stadium 2002	33,458
13	2017.05.27	Shimizu S-Pulse	1-3	Yokohama F. Marinos	IAI Stadium Nihondaira	12,865
14	2017.06.04	Shimizu S-Pulse	0-2	FC Tokyo	IAI Stadium Nihondaira	13,442
15	2017.06.17	Cerezo Osaka	1-1	Shimizu S-Pulse	Yanmar Stadium Nagai	22,737
16	2017.06.25	Shimizu S-Pulse	1-0	Ventforet Kofu	IAI Stadium Nihondaira	11,007
17	2017.07.01	Hokkaido Consadole Sapporo	1-0	Shimizu S-Pulse	Sapporo Dome	12,890
18	2017.07.08	Shimizu S-Pulse	2-0	Gamba Osaka	IAI Stadium Nihondaira	15,766
19	2017.07.29	Yokohama F. Marinos	2-2	Shimizu S-Pulse	Nissan Stadium	24,881
20	2017.08.05	Sagan Tosu	2-1	Shimizu S-Pulse	Best Amenity Stadium	9,628
21	2017.08.09	Shimizu S-Pulse	3-2	Cerezo Osaka	IAI Stadium Nihondaira	12,324
22	2017.08.13	Shimizu S-Pulse	1-4	Kashiwa Reysol	IAI Stadium Nihondaira	17,482
23	2017.08.19	Kashima Antlers	2-0	Shimizu S-Pulse	Kashima Soccer Stadium	16,979
24	2017.08.27	Shimizu S-Pulse	1-2	Urawa Reds	IAI Stadium Nihondaira	16,194
25	2017.09.09	Ventforet Kofu	0-1	Shimizu S-Pulse	Yamanashi Chuo Bank Stadium	12,683
26	2017.09.16	Shimizu S-Pulse	0-3	Kawasaki Frontale	IAI Stadium Nihondaira	13,585
27	2017.09.23	Shimizu S-Pulse	1-3	Sanfrecce Hiroshima	IAI Stadium Nihondaira	14,441
28	2017.09.30	Omiya Ardija	0-0	Shimizu S-Pulse	NACK5 Stadium Omiya	11,545
29	2017.10.14	Shimizu S-Pulse	0-3	Júbilo Iwata	IAI Stadium Nihondaira	18,556
30	2017.10.21	Vegalta Sendai	0-0	Shimizu S-Pulse	Yurtec Stadium Sendai	14,338
31	2017.10.29	FC Tokyo	0-0	Shimizu S-Pulse	Ajinomoto Stadium	13,417
32	2017.11.18	Shimizu S-Pulse	0-2	Hokkaido Consadole Sapporo	IAI Stadium Nihondaira	13,723
33	2017.11.26	Shimizu S-Pulse	2-3	Albirex Niigata	IAI Stadium Nihondaira	17,091
34	2017.12.02	Vissel Kobe	1-3	Shimizu S-Pulse	Kobe Universiade Memorial Stadium	17,174
