= 2014 Shimizu S-Pulse season =

Shimizu S-Pulse
2014 season
- Manager: Afshin Ghotbi; Katsumi Oenoki
- Stadium: IAI Stadium Nihondaira
- J1 League: 15th

During the 2014 season, Shimizu S-Pulse competed in the J1 League, in which they finished 15th.

== J1 League ==
| Match | Date | Team | Score | Team | Venue | Attendance |
|---|---|---|---|---|---|---|
| 1 | 2014.03.01 | Nagoya Grampus | 2-3 | Shimizu S-Pulse | Toyota Stadium | 21,657 |
| 2 | 2014.03.08 | Shimizu S-Pulse | 0-1 | Yokohama F. Marinos | IAI Stadium Nihondaira | 17,877 |
| 3 | 2014.03.15 | Cerezo Osaka | 4-1 | Shimizu S-Pulse | Yanmar Stadium Nagai | 20,323 |
| 4 | 2014.03.23 | Urawa Reds | 1-1 | Shimizu S-Pulse | Saitama Stadium 2002 | 0 |
| 5 | 2014.03.29 | Shimizu S-Pulse | 1-3 | FC Tokyo | IAI Stadium Nihondaira | 14,420 |
| 6 | 2014.04.06 | Ventforet Kofu | 0-1 | Shimizu S-Pulse | Yamanashi Chuo Bank Stadium | 10,144 |
| 7 | 2014.04.12 | Shimizu S-Pulse | 2-0 | Omiya Ardija | IAI Stadium Nihondaira | 11,497 |
| 8 | 2014.04.19 | Tokushima Vortis | 0-4 | Shimizu S-Pulse | Pocarisweat Stadium | 6,113 |
| 9 | 2014.04.26 | Shimizu S-Pulse | 1-0 | Vegalta Sendai | IAI Stadium Nihondaira | 11,188 |
| 10 | 2014.04.29 | Kashima Antlers | 2-1 | Shimizu S-Pulse | Kashima Soccer Stadium | 15,077 |
| 11 | 2014.05.03 | Shimizu S-Pulse | 0-1 | Sagan Tosu | IAI Stadium Nihondaira | 17,286 |
| 12 | 2014.05.06 | Albirex Niigata | 2-1 | Shimizu S-Pulse | Denka Big Swan Stadium | 35,533 |
| 13 | 2014.05.10 | Sanfrecce Hiroshima | 1-1 | Shimizu S-Pulse | Edion Stadium Hiroshima | 12,960 |
| 14 | 2014.05.17 | Shimizu S-Pulse | 1-1 | Vissel Kobe | IAI Stadium Nihondaira | 12,639 |
| 15 | 2014.07.19 | Shimizu S-Pulse | 0-2 | Kawasaki Frontale | IAI Stadium Nihondaira | 15,305 |
| 16 | 2014.07.23 | Gamba Osaka | 4-0 | Shimizu S-Pulse | Expo '70 Commemorative Stadium | 10,898 |
| 17 | 2014.07.27 | Shimizu S-Pulse | 3-0 | Kashiwa Reysol | IAI Stadium Nihondaira | 11,095 |
| 18 | 2014.08.02 | FC Tokyo | 4-0 | Shimizu S-Pulse | Ajinomoto Stadium | 24,119 |
| 19 | 2014.08.09 | Shimizu S-Pulse | 1-0 | Tokushima Vortis | IAI Stadium Nihondaira | 11,887 |
| 20 | 2014.08.16 | Vegalta Sendai | 3-2 | Shimizu S-Pulse | Yurtec Stadium Sendai | 14,252 |
| 21 | 2014.08.23 | Shimizu S-Pulse | 1-3 | Kashima Antlers | IAI Stadium Nihondaira | 13,447 |
| 22 | 2014.08.30 | Sagan Tosu | 2-2 | Shimizu S-Pulse | Best Amenity Stadium | 17,234 |
| 23 | 2014.09.13 | Shimizu S-Pulse | 1-4 | Urawa Reds | Shizuoka Stadium | 19,059 |
| 24 | 2014.09.20 | Vissel Kobe | 3-1 | Shimizu S-Pulse | Kobe Universiade Memorial Stadium | 14,850 |
| 25 | 2014.09.23 | Shimizu S-Pulse | 0-3 | Gamba Osaka | IAI Stadium Nihondaira | 15,093 |
| 26 | 2014.09.27 | Omiya Ardija | 2-1 | Shimizu S-Pulse | NACK5 Stadium Omiya | 11,684 |
| 27 | 2014.10.05 | Shimizu S-Pulse | 3-0 | Cerezo Osaka | IAI Stadium Nihondaira | 11,971 |
| 28 | 2014.10.18 | Yokohama F. Marinos | 1-0 | Shimizu S-Pulse | Nissan Stadium | 19,310 |
| 29 | 2014.10.22 | Shimizu S-Pulse | 2-1 | Albirex Niigata | IAI Stadium Nihondaira | 8,539 |
| 30 | 2014.10.26 | Shimizu S-Pulse | 1-3 | Sanfrecce Hiroshima | IAI Stadium Nihondaira | 13,098 |
| 31 | 2014.11.02 | Kawasaki Frontale | 2-3 | Shimizu S-Pulse | Kawasaki Todoroki Stadium | 19,169 |
| 32 | 2014.11.22 | Shimizu S-Pulse | 2-2 | Nagoya Grampus | IAI Stadium Nihondaira | 17,352 |
| 33 | 2014.11.29 | Kashiwa Reysol | 3-1 | Shimizu S-Pulse | Hitachi Kashiwa Stadium | 13,470 |
| 34 | 2014.12.06 | Shimizu S-Pulse | 0-0 | Ventforet Kofu | IAI Stadium Nihondaira | 19,824 |
