= 2016 Shimizu S-Pulse season =

Shimizu S-Pulse
2016 season
- Manager: Shinji Kobayashi
- Stadium: IAI Stadium Nihondaira
- J2 League: 2nd

2016 Shimizu S-Pulse season.

== J2 League ==
=== League table ===
Pos	Team	Pld	W	D	L	GF	GA	GD	Pts	Promotion, qualification or relegation
1	Consadole Sapporo (C, P)	42	25	10	7	65	33	+32	85	Promotion to 2017 J1 League
2	Shimizu S-Pulse (P)	42	25	9	8	85	37	+48	84	Promotion to 2017 J1 League
3	Matsumoto Yamaga	42	24	12	6	62	32	+30	84	Qualification for promotion playoffs (Note: Only teams that meet J1 license criteria can participate in promotion playoffs. If one or more teams fail to meet the criteria, only eligible teams that finished 3rd to 6th will participate and no replacement teams will be added.)

Updated to match(es) played on 20 November 2016. Source: 2016 MEIJI YASUDA J2 LEAGUE League table
Rules for classification: 1) Points; 2) Goal difference; 3) Goals scored
(C) Champions; (P) Promoted

=== Match details ===
J2 League match details
Match	Date	Team	Score	Team	Venue	Attendance
1	2016.02.28	Shimizu S-Pulse	0-0	Ehime FC	IAI Stadium Nihondaira	15,453
2	2016.03.06	V-Varen Nagasaki	0-3	Shimizu S-Pulse	Nagasaki Stadium	6,286
3	2016.03.13	Shimizu S-Pulse	0-0	Matsumoto Yamaga FC	IAI Stadium Nihondaira	13,078
4	2016.03.20	Shimizu S-Pulse	0-2	Hokkaido Consadole Sapporo	IAI Stadium Nihondaira	12,624
5	2016.03.26	Montedio Yamagata	0-1	Shimizu S-Pulse	ND Soft Stadium Yamagata	7,161
6	2016.04.03	Roasso Kumamoto	0-2	Shimizu S-Pulse	Umakana-Yokana Stadium	9,727
7	2016.04.09	Shimizu S-Pulse	0-2	Cerezo Osaka	IAI Stadium Nihondaira	15,083
8	2016.04.17	Shimizu S-Pulse	2-2	Kamatamare Sanuki	IAI Stadium Nihondaira	6,552
9	2016.04.23	Giravanz Kitakyushu	1-2	Shimizu S-Pulse	Honjo Stadium	2,589
10	2016.04.29	Shimizu S-Pulse	4-1	Zweigen Kanazawa	IAI Stadium Nihondaira	11,057
11	2016.05.03	Kyoto Sanga FC	2-1	Shimizu S-Pulse	Kyoto Nishikyogoku Athletic Stadium	8,140
12	2016.05.08	FC Gifu	1-1	Shimizu S-Pulse	Gifu Nagaragawa Stadium	6,124
13	2016.05.15	Shimizu S-Pulse	0-1	Tokushima Vortis	IAI Stadium Nihondaira	10,469
14	2016.05.22	Tokyo Verdy	2-1	Shimizu S-Pulse	Ajinomoto Stadium	8,792
15	2016.05.28	Shimizu S-Pulse	8-0	Thespakusatsu Gunma	IAI Stadium Nihondaira	8,310
16	2016.06.04	Mito HollyHock	0-0	Shimizu S-Pulse	K's denki Stadium Mito	8,827
17	2016.06.08	FC Machida Zelvia	1-2	Shimizu S-Pulse	Machida Stadium	6,171
18	2016.06.12	Shimizu S-Pulse	3-0	Yokohama FC	IAI Stadium Nihondaira	11,647
19	2016.06.19	Shimizu S-Pulse	1-1	JEF United Chiba	IAI Stadium Nihondaira	8,730
20	2016.06.26	Renofa Yamaguchi FC	0-4	Shimizu S-Pulse	Ishin Memorial Park Stadium	7,310
21	2016.07.03	Fagiano Okayama	2-2	Shimizu S-Pulse	City Light Stadium	11,090
22	2016.07.10	Shimizu S-Pulse	4-0	Roasso Kumamoto	IAI Stadium Nihondaira	10,553
23	2016.07.16	Ehime FC	2-2	Shimizu S-Pulse	Ningineer Stadium	4,897
24	2016.07.20	Shimizu S-Pulse	0-1	Tokyo Verdy	IAI Stadium Nihondaira	7,083
25	2016.07.24	JEF United Chiba	3-4	Shimizu S-Pulse	Fukuda Denshi Arena	12,400
26	2016.07.31	Shimizu S-Pulse	2-0	FC Gifu	IAI Stadium Nihondaira	11,143
27	2016.08.07	Hokkaido Consadole Sapporo	3-2	Shimizu S-Pulse	Sapporo Dome	17,576
28	2016.08.11	Shimizu S-Pulse	2-0	V-Varen Nagasaki	IAI Stadium Nihondaira	10,356
29	2016.08.14	Shimizu S-Pulse	2-2	Renofa Yamaguchi FC	IAI Stadium Nihondaira	12,729
30	2016.08.21	Yokohama FC	0-2	Shimizu S-Pulse	NHK Spring Mitsuzawa Football Stadium	6,302
31	2016.09.11	Shimizu S-Pulse	3-1	Montedio Yamagata	IAI Stadium Nihondaira	8,646
32	2016.09.18	Shimizu S-Pulse	2-1	Mito HollyHock	IAI Stadium Nihondaira	10,098
33	2016.09.25	Matsumoto Yamaga FC	1-0	Shimizu S-Pulse	Matsumotodaira Park Stadium	17,880
34	2016.10.02	Cerezo Osaka	1-2	Shimizu S-Pulse	Yanmar Stadium Nagai	23,781
35	2016.10.08	Shimizu S-Pulse	2-0	FC Machida Zelvia	IAI Stadium Nihondaira	10,607
36	2016.10.16	Zweigen Kanazawa	0-3	Shimizu S-Pulse	Ishikawa Athletics Stadium	6,655
37	2016.10.23	Shimizu S-Pulse	2-0	Giravanz Kitakyushu	IAI Stadium Nihondaira	12,159
38	2016.10.29	Thespakusatsu Gunma	0-4	Shimizu S-Pulse	Shoda Shoyu Stadium Gunma	6,227
39	2016.11.03	Shimizu S-Pulse	4-1	Kyoto Sanga FC	IAI Stadium Nihondaira	13,632
40	2016.11.06	Kamatamare Sanuki	1-2	Shimizu S-Pulse	Pikara Stadium	4,609
41	2016.11.12	Shimizu S-Pulse	2-1	Fagiano Okayama	IAI Stadium Nihondaira	16,740
42	2016.11.20	Tokushima Vortis	1-2	Shimizu S-Pulse	Pocarisweat Stadium	9,767
