= Toshiyuki Takagi =

Japanese footballer

Toshiyuki Takagi 高木 俊幸
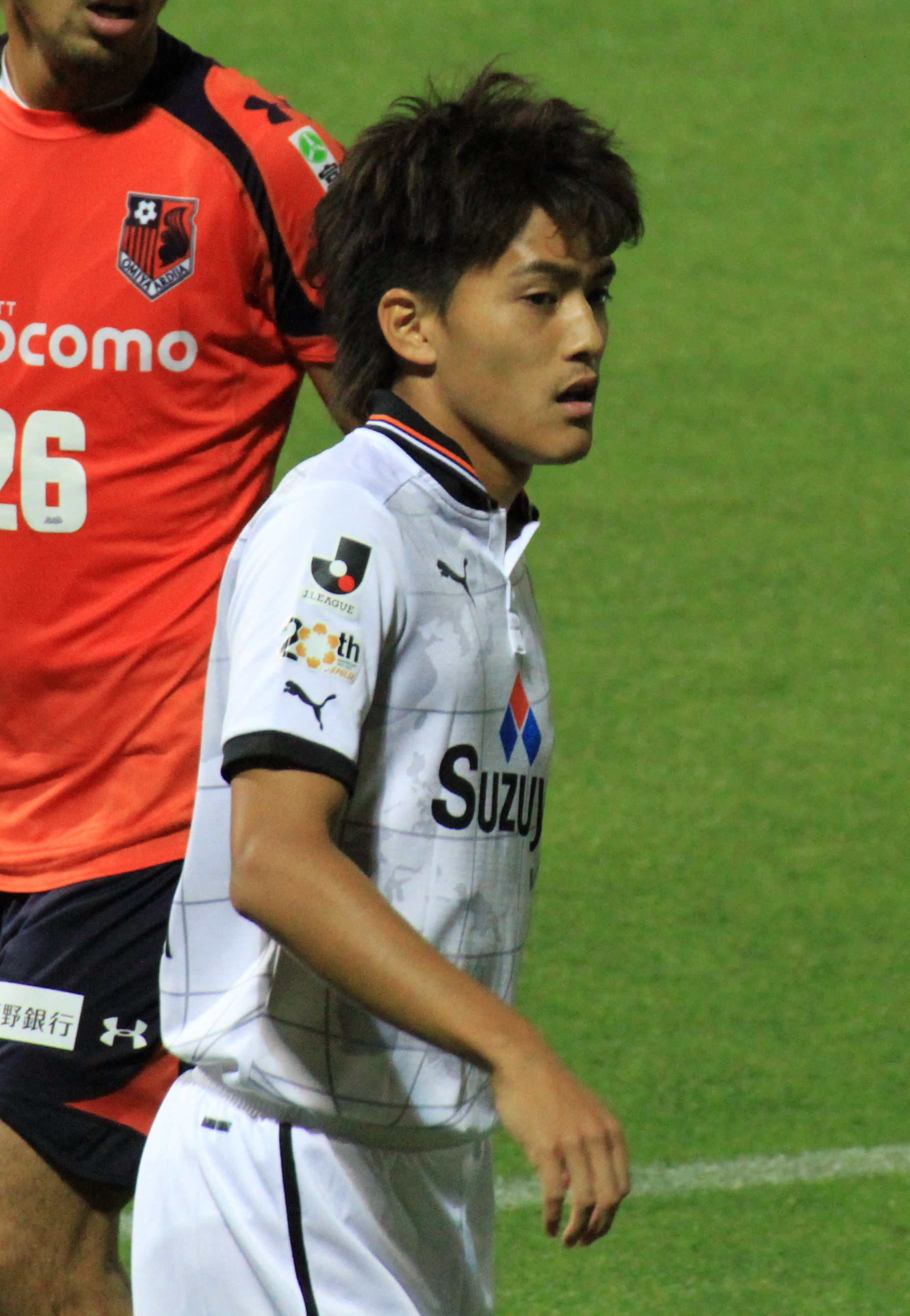
- Takagi with Shimizu S-Pulse in 2012

Personal information
- Full name: Toshiyuki Takagi
- Date of birth: 25 May 1991 (age 35)
- Place of birth: Yokohama, Kanagawa, Japan
- Height: 1.70 m (5 ft 7 in)
- Positions: Second striker; attacking midfielder

Team information
- Current team: Tokyo United FC
- Number: 13

Youth career
- Azamino FC
- –2009: Tokyo Verdy

Senior career*
Years	Team	Apps	(Gls)
2009–2010	Tokyo Verdy	30	(6)
2011–2014	Shimizu S-Pulse	120	(20)
2015–2017	Urawa Red Diamonds	47	(4)
2018–2021	Cerezo Osaka	84	(10)
2022–2024	JEF United Chiba	60	(3)
2025–	Tokyo United FC		

International career^{‡}
2008–2009	Japan U20	7	(3)
Medal record
Shimizu S-Pulse
Runner-up	J.League Cup	2012
Urawa Red Diamonds
Winner	AFC Champions League	2017
Runner-up	J1 League	2016
Winner	J.League Cup	2016
Runner-up	Emperor's Cup	2015
- * Club domestic league appearances and goals as of 22:15, 19 April 2026 (UTC) ‡ National team caps and goals as of 27 June 2010

Toshiyuki Takagi (高木 俊幸, Takagi Toshiyuki; born 25 May 1991) is a Japanese footballer who plays as a forward for Tokyo United FC.

== Family ==
He comes from a sports family. His father Yutaka is a former professional baseball player, notably for Yokohama BayStars. He is the eldest of three brothers. His younger brother Yoshiaki currently plays for Albirex Niigata and youngest brother Daisuke plays for Renofa Yamaguchi FC.

== Career statistics ==
=== Club ===
As of 19 April 2026.

Appearances and goals by club, season and competition
Club	Season	League			National cup (Note: Includes Emperors Cup)		League cup (Note: Includes J.League Cup)		Continental		Other		Total	
Club	Season	Division	Apps	Goals	Apps	Goals	Apps	Goals	Apps	Goals	Apps	Goals	Apps	Goals
Tokyo Verdy	2009	J.League Division 2	5	0	0	0	–		–		–		5	0
Tokyo Verdy	2010	J.League Division 2	25	6	1	0	–		–		–		26	6
Tokyo Verdy	Total		30	6	1	0	0	0	0	0	0	0	31	6
Shimizu S-Pulse	2011	J.League Division 1	29	2	4	1	4	1	–		–		37	4
Shimizu S-Pulse	2012	J.League Division 1	30	9	2	0	8	2	–		–		40	11
Shimizu S-Pulse	2013	J.League Division 1	30	6	3	2	4	0	–		–		37	8
Shimizu S-Pulse	2014	J.League Division 1	31	3	4	2	4	1	–		–		39	6
Shimizu S-Pulse	Total		120	20	13	5	20	4	0	0	0	0	153	29
Urawa Reds	2015	J1 League	21	2	2	1	2	0	4 (Note: Appearances in AFC Champions League Elite)	0	1 (Note: Appearance in Japanese Super Cup)	0	30	3
Urawa Reds	2016	J1 League	14	2	1	0	5	4	2	0	1 (Note: Appearance in J.League Championship)	0	23	6
Urawa Reds	2017	J1 League	12	0	3	1	2	0	6	1	1 (Note: Appearance in FIFA Club World Cup)	0	24	2
Urawa Reds	Total		47	4	6	2	9	4	12	1	3	0	77	11
Cerezo Osaka	2018	J1 League	30	6	2	1	2	1	4	0	2	1	40	9
Cerezo Osaka	2019	J1 League	19	2	2	1	7	0	0	0	0	0	28	3
Cerezo Osaka	2020	J1 League	16	1	0	0	1	1	0	0	0	0	17	2
Cerezo Osaka	2021	J1 League	19	1	3	0	1	0	4	0	0	0	27	1
Cerezo Osaka	Total		84	10	7	2	11	2	8	0	2	1	112	15
JEF United Chiba	2022	J2 League	29	3	0	0	0	0	–		–		29	3
JEF United Chiba	2023	J2 League	20	0	1	0	0	0	–		–		21	0
JEF United Chiba	2024	J2 League	11	0	4	1	1	0	–		–		16	1
JEF United Chiba	Total		60	3	5	1	1	0	0	0	0	0	66	4
Career total			341	43	32	10	41	10	20	1	5	1	439	65

== Honours ==
=== Club ===
Urawa Red Diamonds

- AFC Champions League: 2017
- J.League Cup: 2016
