= 2013 Shimizu S-Pulse season =

Shimizu S-Pulse
2013 season
- Manager: Afshin Ghotbi
- Stadium: IAI Stadium Nihondaira
- J1 League: 9th

The 2013 Shimizu S-Pulse season was Shimizu S-Pulse's 21st consecutive season in J.League Division 1. Shimizu S-Pulse also competed in the 2013 Emperor's Cup and 2013 J.League Cup.

== J1 League ==
S-Pulse finished the season ninth in the J.League.

=== League table ===
Pos	Team	Pld	W	D	L	GF	GA	GD	Pts
7	Albirex Niigata	34	17	4	13	48	42	+6	55
8	FC Tokyo	34	16	6	12	61	47	+14	54
9	Shimizu S-Pulse	34	15	5	14	48	57	−9	50
10	Kashiwa Reysol	34	13	9	12	56	59	−3	48
11	Nagoya Grampus	34	13	8	13	47	48	−1	47

Updated to match(es) played on 7 December 2013. Source: J.League Division 1
Rules for classification: 1) points; 2) goal difference; 3) number of goals scored.

=== Matches ===
Match	Date	Team	Venue	Result	Score	Attendance
1	2013.03.02	Omiya Ardija	A	D	2–2	11,330
2	2013.03.09	Yokohama F. Marinos	H	L	0–5	16,487
3	2013.03.16	Shonan Bellmare	A	D	1–1	9,453
4	2013.03.30	Sanfrecce Hiroshima	H	L	0–4	13,137
5	2013.04.06	Sagan Tosu	A	W	1–0	6,707
6	2013.04.13	Júbilo Iwata	H	W	1–0	15,113
7	2013.04.20	Cerezo Osaka	H	D	1–1	10,252
8	2013.04.27	Urawa Reds	A	W	1–0	37,945
9	2013.05.03	Albirex Niigata	H	L	1–2	16,380
10	2013.05.06	Kawasaki Frontale	H	L	1–2	16,829
11	2013.05.11	Ventforet Kofu	A	W	2–0	7,754
12	2013.05.18	FC Tokyo	A	L	0–2	24,003
13	2013.05.25	Vegalta Sendai	H	W	2–0	12,642
14	2013.07.06	Nagoya Grampus	A	L	1–2	17,950
15	2013.07.10	Kashima Antlers	A	L	1–3	7,495
16	2013.07.13	Oita Trinita	H	W	3–1	15,191
17	2013.07.17	Kashiwa Reysol	A	D	2–2	7,013
18	2013.07.31	FC Tokyo	H	D	0–0	10,781
19	2013.08.03	Albirex Niigata	A	L	1–3	22,650
20	2013.08.10	Shonan Bellmare	H	W	3–1	15,395
21	2013.08.17	Cerezo Osaka	A	L	1–4	16,196
22	2013.08.24	Urawa Reds	H (Note: Match played at Shizuoka Stadium.)	L	0–2	21,420
23	2013.08.28	Kashima Antlers	H	W	4–3	9,238
24	2013.08.31	Oita Trinita	A	W	3–2	9,108
25	2013.09.14	Nagoya Grampus	H	W	2–1	13,189
26	2013.09.21	Yokohama F. Marinos	A	L	0–1	13,416
27	2013.09.28	Ventforet Kofu	H	W	2–1	15,088
28	2013.10.05	Sanfrecce Hiroshima	A	L	1–3	15,512
29	2013.10.19	Sagan Tosu	H	W	6–4	11,846
30	2013.10.27	Júbilo Iwata	A	W	1–0	12,467
31	2013.11.10	Kawasaki Frontale	A	L	0–2	14,986
32	2013.11.23	Omiya Ardija	H	W	1–0	13,151
33	2013.11.30	Vegalta Sendai	A	W	2–1	17,394
34	2013.12.07	Kashiwa Reysol	H	L	1–2	14,185
