= Sho Ito =

Japanese footballer (born 1988)

Sho Ito 伊藤 翔
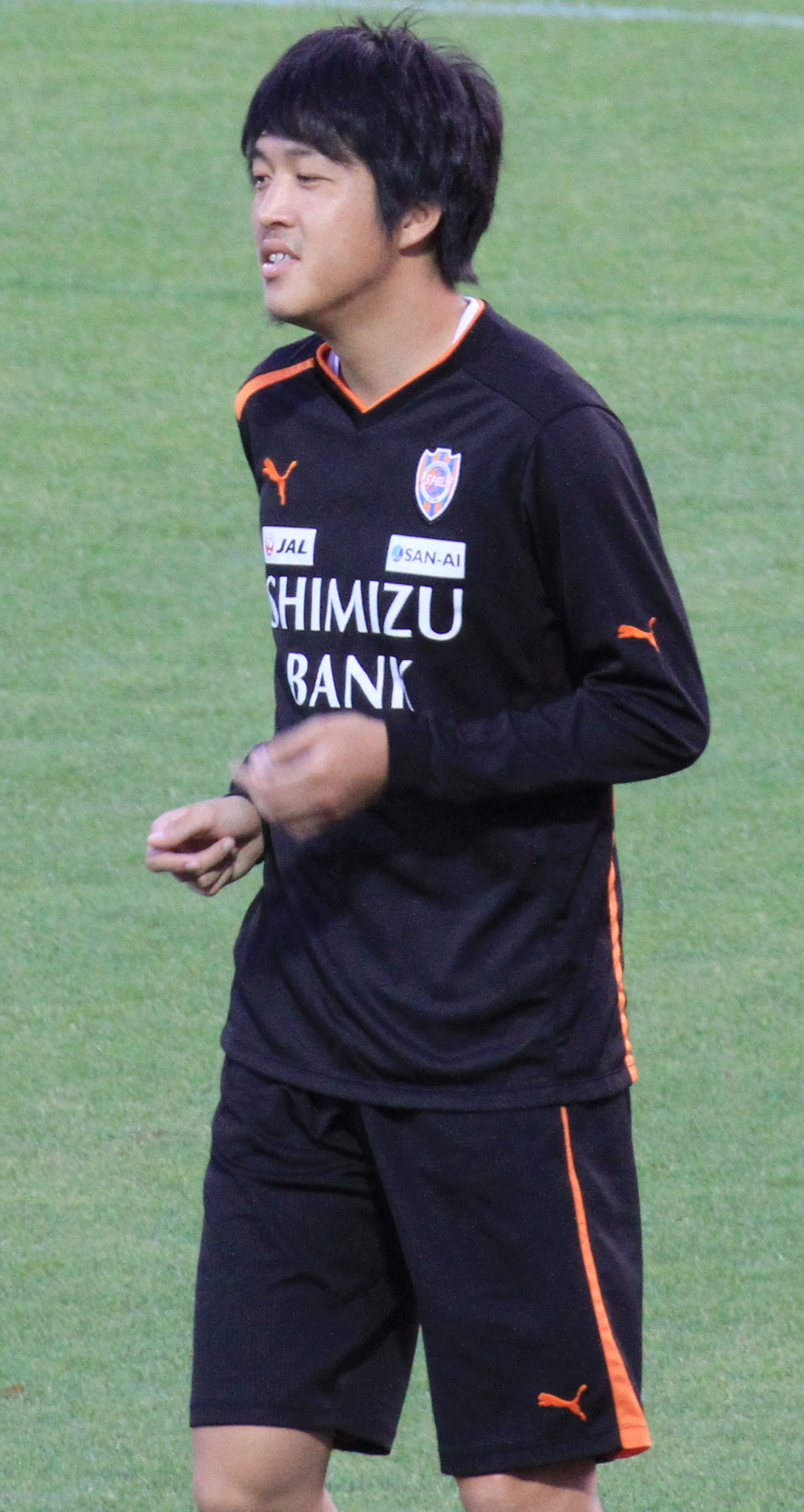
- Ito in 2012

Personal information
- Date of birth: 24 July 1988 (age 38)
- Place of birth: Kasugai, Aichi, Japan
- Height: 1.84 m (6 ft 0 in)
- Position: Forward

Team information
- Current team: Yokohama FC
- Number: 15

Youth career
- 2004–2006: Chukyo Univ. Chukyo High School

Senior career*
Years	Team	Apps	(Gls)
2007–2010	Grenoble	5	(0)
2010–2013	Shimizu S-Pulse	49	(8)
2014–2018	Yokohama F. Marinos	134	(29)
2019–2020	Kashima Antlers	40	(8)
2021–	Yokohama FC	111	(16)
2021	→ Matsumoto Yamaga (loan)	18	(4)

International career^{‡}
2005–2006	Japan U20	3	(0)
Medal record
Shimizu S-Pulse
Runner-up	J.League Cup	2012
Runner-up	Emperor's Cup	2010
Yokohama F. Marinos
Runner-up	J.League Cup	2018
Runner-up	Emperor's Cup	2017
Representing Japan
AFC U-19 Championship
Silver medal – second place	2006 India
- * Club domestic league appearances and goals as of 16 September 2025 ‡ National team caps and goals as of 31 December 2009

Sho Ito (伊藤 翔, Itō Shō; born 24 July 1988) is a Japanese professional footballer who plays as a forward for Yokohama FC. He represented Japan's under-20 team at the 2006 AFC Youth Championship.

== Career ==
In August 2006, Ito received a trial from English club Arsenal, where he impressed manager Arsène Wenger. However, his work permit application fell through, and in January 2007, he signed a three-and-a-half-year contract with French club Grenoble.

== Career statistics ==
=== Club ===
As of 23 October 2022

Appearances and goals by club, season and competition
Club	Season	League			National cup		League cup		Continental		Total	
Club	Season	Division	Apps	Goals	Apps	Goals	Apps	Goals	Apps	Goals	Apps	Goals
Grenoble	2006–07	Ligue 2	1	0	0	0	0	0	–		1	0
Grenoble	2007–08	Ligue 2	3	0	1	0	0	0	–		4	0
Grenoble	2008–09	Ligue 1	0	0	0	0	0	0	–		0	0
Grenoble	2009–10	Ligue 1	1	0	0	0	0	0	–		1	0
Grenoble	Total		5	0	1	0	0	0	0	0	6	0
Shimizu S-Pulse	2010	J1 League	2	0	2	0	0	0	–		4	0
Shimizu S-Pulse	2011	J1 League	11	1	3	1	1	0	–		15	2
Shimizu S-Pulse	2012	J1 League	11	1	3	1	5	1	–		19	3
Shimizu S-Pulse	2013	J1 League	25	6	1	0	3	0	–		29	6
Shimizu S-Pulse	Total		49	8	9	2	9	1	0	0	67	11
Yokohama F. Marinos	2014	J1 League	32	8	1	0	2	0	4	1	39	9
Yokohama F. Marinos	2015	J1 League	29	6	3	2	6	1	–		38	9
Yokohama F. Marinos	2016	J1 League	32	5	2	0	8	3	–		42	8
Yokohama F. Marinos	2017	J1 League	15	2	3	2	3	0	–		21	4
Yokohama F. Marinos	2018	J1 League	26	8	4	1	9	8	–		39	17
Yokohama F. Marinos	Total		134	29	13	5	28	12	4	1	179	47
Kashima Antlers	2019	J1 League	26	7	5	3	4	1	8	5	43	16
Kashima Antlers	2020	J1 League	14	1	–		2	2	1	0	17	3
Kashima Antlers	Total		40	8	5	3	6	3	9	5	60	19
Yokohama FC	2021	J1 League	15	0	1	0	4	1	–		20	1
Yokohama FC	2022	J2 League	25	6	0	0	–		–		25	6
Yokohama FC	2023	J1 League	0	0	0	0	0	0	–		0	0
Yokohama FC	Total		40	6	1	0	4	1	0	0	45	7
Matsumoto Yamaga (loan)	2021	J2 League	18	4	0	0	0	0	–		18	4
Career total			286	55	29	10	47	17	13	6	375	78

=== International ===
==== Appearances in major competitions ====
Team	Competition	Category	Appearances		Goals	Team record
Team	Competition	Category	Start	Sub	Goals	Team record
Japan	AFC Youth Championship 2006 qualification	U-18	0	1	0	Qualified
Japan	AFC Youth Championship 2006	U-19	0	2	0	Runners-Up
