= 2015 Shimizu S-Pulse season =

Shimizu S-Pulse
2015 season
- Manager: Katsumi Oenoki; Kazuaki Tasaka
- Stadium: IAI Stadium Nihondaira
- J1 League: 17th

2015 Shimizu S-Pulse season.

== J1 League ==
=== League table ===
Pos	Team	Pld	W	D	L	GF	GA	GD	Pts	Qualification or relegation
16	Matsumoto Yamaga (R)	34	7	7	20	30	54	−24	28	Relegation to 2016 J2 League
17	Shimizu S-Pulse (R)	34	5	10	19	37	65	−28	25	Relegation to 2016 J2 League
18	Montedio Yamagata (R)	34	4	12	18	24	53	−29	24	Relegation to 2016 J2 League

Updated to match(es) played on 28 November 2015. Source: Meiji Yasuda J1 League Standings
Rules for classification: 1) Points; 2) Goal difference; 3) Goals scored
(R) Relegated

=== Match details ===
J1 League match details
Match	Date	Team	Score	Team	Venue	Attendance
1-1	2015.03.08	Shimizu S-Pulse	3-1	Kashima Antlers	IAI Stadium Nihondaira	19,736
1-2	2015.03.14	Albirex Niigata	0-0	Shimizu S-Pulse	Denka Big Swan Stadium	19,537
1-3	2015.03.22	Shimizu S-Pulse	0-1	Matsumoto Yamaga FC	IAI Stadium Nihondaira	19,103
1-4	2015.04.04	Vegalta Sendai	2-1	Shimizu S-Pulse	Yurtec Stadium Sendai	14,706
1-5	2015.04.12	Shimizu S-Pulse	2-3	Gamba Osaka	IAI Stadium Nihondaira	16,027
1-6	2015.04.18	Nagoya Grampus	3-1	Shimizu S-Pulse	Paloma Mizuho Stadium	9,986
1-7	2015.04.25	Sanfrecce Hiroshima	2-0	Shimizu S-Pulse	Edion Stadium Hiroshima	11,653
1-8	2015.04.29	Shimizu S-Pulse	3-3	Montedio Yamagata	IAI Stadium Nihondaira	11,348
1-9	2015.05.02	Kashiwa Reysol	0-0	Shimizu S-Pulse	Hitachi Kashiwa Stadium	13,960
1-10	2015.05.06	Shimizu S-Pulse	2-2	Sagan Tosu	IAI Stadium Nihondaira	14,029
1-11	2015.05.10	Vissel Kobe	1-2	Shimizu S-Pulse	Noevir Stadium Kobe	14,397
1-12	2015.05.16	Shimizu S-Pulse	1-2	Yokohama F. Marinos	IAI Stadium Nihondaira	12,978
1-13	2015.05.23	Shonan Bellmare	4-0	Shimizu S-Pulse	Shonan BMW Stadium Hiratsuka	13,248
1-14	2015.05.30	Shimizu S-Pulse	5-2	Kawasaki Frontale	IAI Stadium Nihondaira	13,055
1-15	2015.06.07	Urawa Reds	1-0	Shimizu S-Pulse	Saitama Stadium 2002	44,424
1-16	2015.06.20	Shimizu S-Pulse	0-2	Ventforet Kofu	IAI Stadium Nihondaira	13,288
1-17	2015.06.27	FC Tokyo	3-2	Shimizu S-Pulse	Ajinomoto Stadium	41,363
2-1	2015.07.11	Shimizu S-Pulse	0-5	Vissel Kobe	IAI Stadium Nihondaira	14,037
2-2	2015.07.15	Kashima Antlers	0-0	Shimizu S-Pulse	Kashima Soccer Stadium	6,923
2-3	2015.07.19	Shimizu S-Pulse	2-2	Nagoya Grampus	IAI Stadium Nihondaira	14,497
2-4	2015.07.25	Kawasaki Frontale	3-2	Shimizu S-Pulse	Kawasaki Todoroki Stadium	20,040
2-5	2015.07.29	Yokohama F. Marinos	1-2	Shimizu S-Pulse	Nissan Stadium	14,848
2-6	2015.08.12	Shimizu S-Pulse	1-2	Shonan Bellmare	IAI Stadium Nihondaira	15,946
2-7	2015.08.16	Shimizu S-Pulse	1-1	Albirex Niigata	IAI Stadium Nihondaira	14,724
2-8	2015.08.22	Gamba Osaka	1-0	Shimizu S-Pulse	Expo '70 Commemorative Stadium	15,333
2-9	2015.08.29	Shimizu S-Pulse	1-1	FC Tokyo	IAI Stadium Nihondaira	14,954
2-10	2015.09.12	Sagan Tosu	0-0	Shimizu S-Pulse	Best Amenity Stadium	10,501
2-11	2015.09.19	Shimizu S-Pulse	1-4	Urawa Reds	Shizuoka Stadium	19,232
2-12	2015.09.26	Shimizu S-Pulse	1-5	Sanfrecce Hiroshima	IAI Stadium Nihondaira	13,053
2-13	2015.10.03	Matsumoto Yamaga FC	1-0	Shimizu S-Pulse	Matsumotodaira Park Stadium	17,371
2-14	2015.10.17	Shimizu S-Pulse	0-1	Vegalta Sendai	IAI Stadium Nihondaira	13,399
2-15	2015.10.24	Shimizu S-Pulse	0-3	Kashiwa Reysol	IAI Stadium Nihondaira	12,238
2-16	2015.11.07	Montedio Yamagata	1-2	Shimizu S-Pulse	ND Soft Stadium Yamagata	8,281
2-17	2015.11.22	Ventforet Kofu	2-2	Shimizu S-Pulse	Yamanashi Chuo Bank Stadium	14,036
