= Genki Omae =

Japanese footballer

Genki Omae 大前 元紀
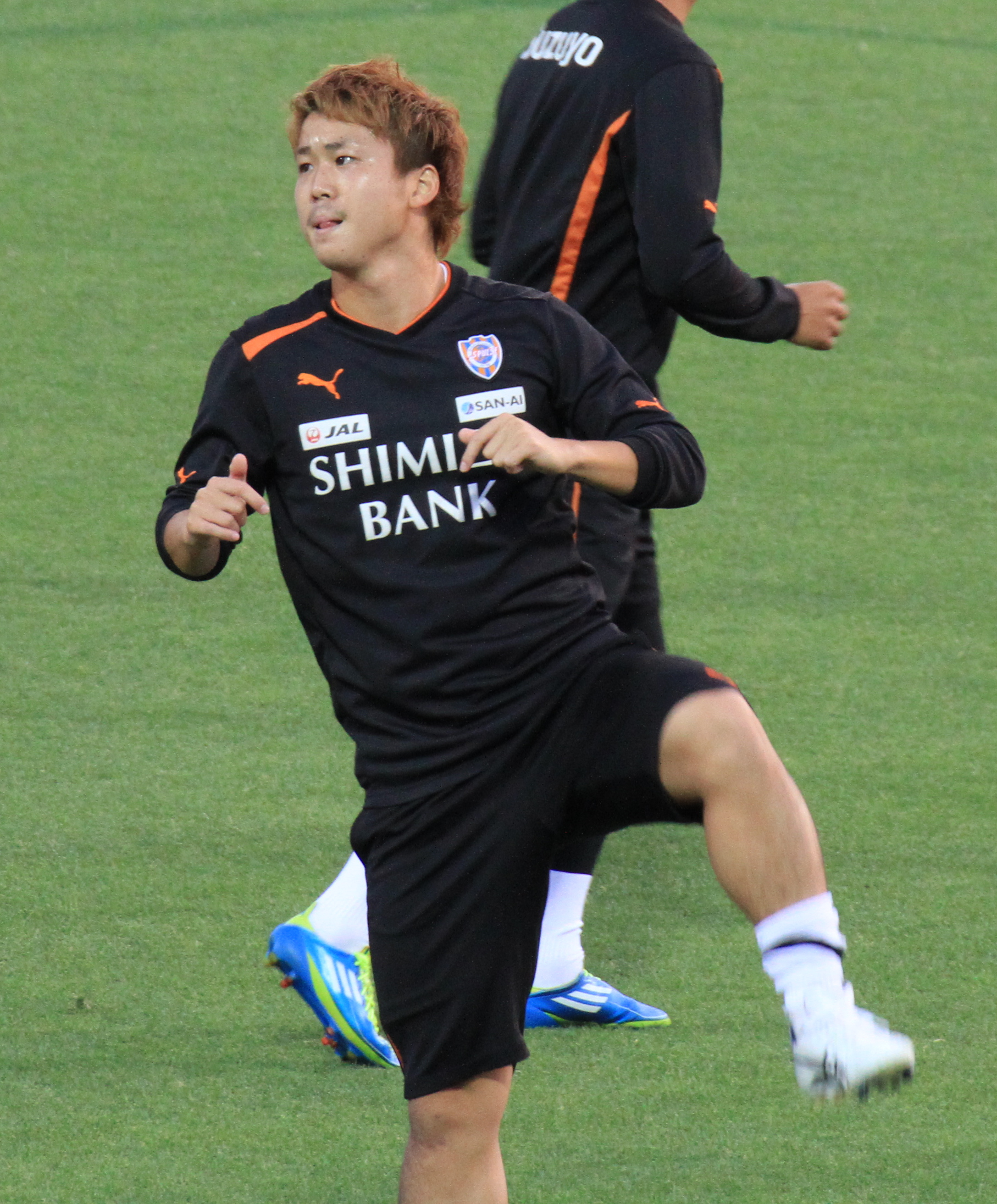
- Genki warming up for a game with S-Pulse in 2012.

Personal information
- Date of birth: 10 December 1989 (age 36)
- Place of birth: Aoba-ku, Yokohama, Japan
- Height: 1.67 m (5 ft 6 in)
- Position: Forward

Team information
- Current team: Nankatsu SC
- Number: 88

Youth career
- 2005–2007: RKU Kashiwa High School

Senior career*
Years	Team	Apps	(Gls)
2008–2012	Shimizu S-Pulse	83	(24)
2013	Fortuna Düsseldorf	7	(0)
2013	→ Shimizu S-Pulse (loan)	14	(7)
2014–2016	Shimizu S-Pulse	95	(35)
2017–2019	Omiya Ardija	97	(31)
2020–2021	Thespakusatsu Gunma	72	(12)
2022	Kyoto Sanga	13	(2)
2023–	Nankatsu SC	34	(10)
Medal record
Shimizu S-Pulse
Runner-up	J.League Cup	2008
Runner-up	J.League Cup	2012
Runner-up	Emperor's Cup	2010
- * Club domestic league appearances and goals as of 1 February 2025, 1:20 (UTC)

Genki Omae (大前 元紀, Ōmae Genki; born 10 December 1989) is a Japanese professional footballer who plays as a forward for and captains Nankatsu SC. He has made several appearances for Japan’s under 19 national team.

== Career ==
Omar was born in Aoba-ku, Yokohama. On 6 January 2020, he was announce signing to J2 promoted club, Thespakusastsu Gunma for 2020 season.

In 2022, Omae joined to J1 promoted club, Kyoto Sanga.

On 1 February 2023, Omae was announce official transfer to Kantō Soccer League club, Nankatsu SC for 2023 season.

== Career statistics ==
As of the start for 2025 season

Appearances and goals by club, season and competition
Club	Season	League			National cup (Note: Includes Emperor's Cup and DFB-Pokal.)		League cup (Note: Includes J. League Cup.)		Total	
Club	Season	Division	Apps	Goals	Apps	Goals	Apps	Goals	Apps	Goals
Shimizu S-Pulse	2008	J.League Div 1	2	0	1	0	3	0	6	0
Shimizu S-Pulse	2009	J.League Div 1	0	0	0	0	2	1	2	1
Shimizu S-Pulse	2010	J.League Div 1	13	3	6	1	6	0	25	4
Shimizu S-Pulse	2011	J.League Div 1	34	8	4	1	4	2	42	11
Shimizu S-Pulse	2012	J.League Div 1	34	13	1	0	10	5	45	18
Fortuna Düsseldorf	2012–13	Bundesliga	7	0	0	0	–		7	0
Shimizu S-Pulse	2013	J.League Div 1	14	7	0	0	0	0	14	7
Shimizu S-Pulse	2014	J.League Div 1	34	6	5	3	6	2	26	7
Shimizu S-Pulse	2015	J1 League	32	11	4	1	0	0	36	12
Shimizu S-Pulse	2016	J2 League	29	18	1	0	–		30	18
Omiya Ardija	2017	J1 League	25	2	1	0	3	0	29	2
Omiya Ardija	2018	J2 League	41	24	1	0	–		42	24
Omiya Ardija	2019	J2 League	31	5	2	1	–		33	6
Thespakusatsu Gunma	2020	J2 League	35	8	–		–		35	8
Thespakusatsu Gunma	2021	J2 League	37	4	2	2	–		39	6
Kyoto Sanga	2022	J1 League	13	2	3	1	5	2	21	5
Nankatsu SC	2023	Kantō Soccer League; Div 1	18	3	0	0	–		0	0
Nankatsu SC	2024	Kantō Soccer League; Div 1	16	7	0	0	–		0	0
Nankatsu SC	2025	Kantō Soccer League; Div 1	0	0	0	0	–		0	0
Career total			416	121	31	11	43	13	490	145

== Honours ==
Individual

- J2 League top scorer: 2018
- J2 League MVP of the Month: June 2018
