= 2009 Nagoya Grampus season =

Nagoya Grampus
2009 season
- Chairman: Toyo Kato
- Manager: Dragan Stojković
- J. League 1: 9th
- Emperor's Cup: Losing Finalist vs Gamba Osaka
- J. League Cup: Quarter finals vs F.C. Tokyo
- AFC Champions League: Semi-Final vs Al-Ittihad
- Top goalscorer: League: Davi (10); All: Davi & Joshua Kennedy (12)
- Highest home attendance: 32,435
- Lowest home attendance: 9,355
- Average home league attendance: 15,928
Home colours	Away colours

The 2009 Nagoya Grampus season was Nagoya Grampus's 17th season in the J. League Division 1 and 28th overall in the Japanese top flight. They competed in the 2009 J. League Cup, 2009 Emperor's Cup, and the 2009 AFC Champions League.

== Squad ==
Note: Flags indicate national team as defined under FIFA eligibility rules; some limited exceptions apply. Players may hold more than one non-FIFA nationality.

No.	Pos.	Nation	Player
1	GK	JPN	Seigo Narazaki
2	DF	JPN	Akira Takeuchi
3	DF	SRB	Miloš Bajalica
4	DF	JPN	Maya Yoshida
5	DF	JPN	Takahiro Masukawa
6	DF	JPN	Shohei Abe
7	MF	JPN	Naoshi Nakamura
8	MF	BRA	Magnum
9	MF	MNE	Igor Burzanović
10	MF	JPN	Yoshizumi Ogawa
11	FW	JPN	Keiji Tamada
13	MF	JPN	Kei Yamaguchi
14	MF	JPN	Keiji Yoshimura
16	FW	AUS	Joshua Kennedy
17	FW	JPN	Yuki Maki
18	FW	JPN	Tomohiro Tsuda

No.	Pos.	Nation	Player
19	FW	JPN	Keita Sugimoto
20	MF	JPN	Yoshiki Hiraki
21	GK	JPN	Koji Nishimura
22	MF	JPN	Koji Hashimoto
23	DF	JPN	Genta Matsuo
24	MF	JPN	Shinta Fukushima
25	FW	JPN	Oribe Niikawa
26	DF	JPN	Masaya Sato
27	MF	JPN	Sho Hanai
28	MF	JPN	Taishi Taguchi name
29	FW	JPN	Hikaru Kuba
30	GK	JPN	Koichi Hirono
31	GK	JPN	Toru Hasegawa
32	DF	JPN	Hayuma Tanaka
33	MF	JPN	Ryota Isomura
38	MF	JPN	Alessandro Santos

== Transfers ==
=== Winter ===
In: Note: Flags indicate national team as defined under FIFA eligibility rules; some limited exceptions apply. Players may hold more than one non-FIFA nationality.

No.	Pos.	Nation	Player
9	FW	BRA	Davi (From (Japan) Consadole Sapporo)
16	FW	AUS	Joshua Kennedy (From (Germany) Karlsruher SC)

Out: Note: Flags indicate national team as defined under FIFA eligibility rules; some limited exceptions apply. Players may hold more than one non-FIFA nationality.

No.	Pos.	Nation	Player
2	DF	JPN	Takashi Miki (To (Japan) Tokushima Vortis)
4	DF	JPN	Masayuki Omori (Retired)
5	DF	JPN	Atsushi Yoneyama (To (Japan) Tochigi S.C.)
9	FW	NOR	Frode Johnsen (to (Japan) Shimizu S-Pulse)
10	MF	JPN	Toshiya Fujita (To (Japan) Roasso Kumamoto)
18	FW	JPN	Masaki Fukai (Loan return to (Japan) Kashima Antlers)
27	DF	JPN	Shosuke Katayama (To (Japan) Yokohama)
28	DF	JPN	Keiji Watanabe (To Japan Soccer College)
32	MF	JPN	Jun Aoyama (Loan to (Japan) Tokushima Vortis)
35	MF	JPN	Wataru Inoue (To (Japan) Tokushima Vortis)

=== Summer ===
In: Note: Flags indicate national team as defined under FIFA eligibility rules; some limited exceptions apply. Players may hold more than one non-FIFA nationality.

No.	Pos.	Nation	Player
9	MF	MNE	Igor Burzanović (From (Serbia) Red Star Belgrade)
38	MF	JPN	Alessandro Santos (From (Japan) Urawa Red Diamonds)

Out: Note: Flags indicate national team as defined under FIFA eligibility rules; some limited exceptions apply. Players may hold more than one non-FIFA nationality.

No.	Pos.	Nation	Player
9	FW	BRA	Davi (to (Qatar) Umm Salal)

== Competitions ==
=== J. League ===
==== Results summary ====
Overall								Home						Away					
Pld	W	D	L	GF	GA	GD	Pts	W	D	L	GF	GA	GD	W	D	L	GF	GA	GD
34	14	8	12	46	42	+4	50	7	4	6	22	22	0	7	4	6	24	20	+4

Last updated: 21 March 2013.
Source: See Below

==== Results by round ====
Round	1	2	3	4	5	6	7	8	9	10	11	12	13	14	15	16	17	18	19	20	21	22	23	24	25	26	27	28	29	30	31	32	33	34
Ground	H	A	H	A	H	A	H	H	A	A	H	A	H	A	H	H	A	H	A	A	H	A	A	H	H	A	A	H	A	H	H	A	H	A
Result	W	D	W	L	L	W	W	D	W	D	D	L	L	L	L	W	L	D	W	L	L	W	W	W	L	W	W	L	L	D	W	D	W	D
Position																																		

Source: "Soccerway.com". Archived from the original on 15 May 2021.
A = Away; H = Home; W = Win; D = Draw; L = Loss

==== Results ====
7 March 2009 Round 1	Nagoya Grampus	3 – 2	Oita Trinita	Toyota
14:00 JST (UTC+9)	Davi 54', 82'; Tamada 75'	Summary	Kanazaki 10'; Takahashi (red card) 78'; Ueslei 84'	Stadium: Toyota Stadium; Attendance: 25,395; Referee: Toshimitsu Yoshida

14 March 2009 Round 2	Montedio Yamagata	0 – 0	Nagoya Grampus	Tendō
16:00 JST (UTC+9)		Summary		Stadium: ND Soft Stadium; Attendance: 12,370; Referee: Masaki Nabeshima

22 March 2009 Round 3	Nagoya Grampus	3 – 1	Shimizu S-Pulse	Nagoya
13:00 JST (UTC+9)	Davi 25', 90'; Yoshimura 76'	Summary	Okazaki 80'	Stadium: Mizuho Athletic Stadium; Attendance: 13,074; Referee: Kazuhiko Matsumura

4 April 2009 Round 4	Kawasaki Frontale	3 – 1	Nagoya Grampus	Kawasaki
15:00 JST (UTC+9)	Vitor Júnior 24'; Taniguchi 29'; Jong Tae-Se 61'	Summary	Magnum 23'	Stadium: Todoroki Athletics Stadium; Attendance: 20,148; Referee: Hajime Matsuo

12 April 2009 Round 5	Nagoya Grampus	0 – 1	Urawa Red Diamonds	Toyota
16:00 JST (UTC+9)		Summary	Haraguchi 43'	Stadium: Toyota Stadium; Attendance: 32,435; Referee: Masaaki Iemoto

18 April 2009 Round 6	Kashiwa Reysol	1 – 2	Nagoya Grampus	Kashiwa
13:00 JST (UTC+9)	Suganuma 59'	Summary	Davi 31', 90'	Stadium: Hitachi Kashiwa Soccer Stadium; Attendance: 10,368; Referee: Masaki Nabeshima

26 April 2009 Round 7	Nagoya Grampus	2 – 1	Yokohama F. Marinos	Nagoya
16:00 JST (UTC+9)	Yoshida 71'; Ogawa 81'	Summary	Sakata 43'	Stadium: Mizuho Athletic Stadium; Attendance: 12,500; Referee: Yuichi Nishimura

29 April 2009 Round 8	Nagoya Grampus	0 – 0	Sanfrecce Hiroshima	Nagoya
14:00 JST (UTC+9)		Summary		Stadium: Mizuho Athletic Stadium; Attendance: 12,137; Referee: Takuya Maeda

2 May 2009 Round 9	Kyoto Sanga	0 – 1	Nagoya Grampus	Kyoto
16:00 JST (UTC+9)		Summary	Davi 41'	Stadium: Nishikyogoku Athletic Stadium; Attendance: 10,950; Referee: Nobutsugu Murakami

10 May 2009 Round 10	Vissel Kobe	2 – 2	Nagoya Grampus	Kobe
19:00 JST (UTC+9)	Mogi 57'; Marcel 62'	Summary	Kim Nam-Il 50' (o.g.); Tsuda 90'	Stadium: Home's Stadium Kobe; Attendance: 10,149; Referee: Hirofumi Yamanishi

16 May 2009 Round 11	Nagoya Grampus	1 – 1	Omiya Ardija	Toyota
15:00 JST (UTC+9)	Davi 81'	Summary	Fujita 4'	Stadium: Toyota Stadium; Attendance: 16,577; Referee: Hajime Matsuo

24 May 2009 Round 12	Júbilo Iwata	2 – 1	Nagoya Grampus	Iwata
13:00 JST (UTC+9)	Nasu 84'; Naruoka 86'	Summary	Ogawa (yellow card) 31' (yellow-red card) 81'; Davi 89'	Stadium: Yamaha Stadium; Attendance: 15,632; Referee: Kazuhiko Matsumura

20 June 2009 Round 13	Nagoya Grampus	0 – 1	JEF United	Nagoya
15:00 JST (UTC+9)		Summary	Fukai 81'	Stadium: Mizuho Athletic Stadium; Attendance: 12,457; Referee: Masayoshi Okada

28 June 2009 Round 14	Albirex Niigata	2 – 1	Nagoya Grampus	Niigata
15:30 JST (UTC+9)	Matsushita 5', 44'	Summary	Magnum (yellow card) 19' (yellow-red card) 27'; Sugimoto 90'	Stadium: Tohoku Denryoku Big Swan Stadium; Attendance: 35,786; Referee: Kenji Ogiya

1 July 2009 Round 15	Nagoya Grampus	0 – 3	Kashima Antlers	Nagoya
JST (UTC+9)		Summary	Koroki 22'; Nozawa 43'; Marquinhos 53'	Stadium: Mizuho Athletic Stadium; Attendance: 9,661; Referee: Hirofumi Yamanishi

5 July 2009 Round 16	Nagoya Grampus	2 – 1	Gamba Osaka	Toyota
16:00 JST (UTC+9)	Davi 45' (pen.); Maki 90'	Summary	Leandro 8'	Stadium: Toyota Stadium; Attendance: 24,749; Referee: Hiroyoshi Takayama

12 July 2009 Round 17	F.C. Tokyo	3 – 0	Nagoya Grampus	Chōfu
18:30 JST (UTC+9)	Ishikawa 3'; Cabore 34'; Suzuki 89'	Summary		Stadium: Ajinomoto Stadium; Attendance: 24,736; Referee: Tsutomu Anazawa

18 July 2009 Round 18	Nagoya Grampus	1 – 1	Kyoto Sanga	Nagoya
19:00 JST (UTC+9)	Kennedy 42'	Summary	Paulinho 81'	Stadium: Mizuho Athletic Stadium; Attendance: 17,784; Referee: Toshimitsu Yoshida

25 July 2009 Round 19	Urawa Red Diamonds	0 – 3	Nagoya Grampus	Saitama
19:00 JST (UTC+9)		Summary	Tamada 14', 61'; Kennedy 72'	Stadium: Saitama Stadium 2002; Attendance: 44,976; Referee: Nobutsugu Murakami

1 August 2009 Round 20	Oita Trinita	2 – 1	Nagoya Grampus	Ōita
19:00 JST (UTC+9)	Takamatsu 89'; Higashi 90'	Summary	Kennedy 26'	Stadium: Ōita Bank Dome; Attendance: 17,461; Referee: Akio Okutani

15 August 2009 Round 21	Nagoya Grampus	0 – 2	Kawasaki Frontale	Nagoya
19:00 JST (UTC+9)		Summary	Juninho 11', 73'	Stadium: Mizuho Athletic Stadium; Attendance: 18,025; Referee: Minoru Tojo

19 August 2009 Round 22	JEF United	0 – 2	Nagoya Grampus	Chiba
19:00 JST (UTC+9)		Summary	Kennedy 24'; Tamada 75'	Stadium: Fukuda Denshi Arena; Attendance: 13,458; Referee: Hiroyoshi Takayama

23 August 2009 Round 23	Gamba Osaka	2 – 3	Nagoya Grampus	Suita
18:00 JST (UTC+9)	Endō 14'; Lucas 45'	Summary	Maki 72'; Tamada 81' (pen.); Magnum 89'; Magnum (yellow card) 87' (yellow-red card) 90'	Stadium: Osaka Expo '70 Stadium; Attendance: 18,134; Referee: Kazuhiko Matsumura

29 August 2009 Round 24	Nagoya Grampus	1 – 0	Albirex Niigata	Nagoya
19:00 JST (UTC+9)	Tamada 20'	Summary		Stadium: Mizuho Athletic Stadium; Attendance: 12,043; Referee: Toshimitsu Yoshida

12 September 2009 Round 25	Nagoya Grampus	2 – 3	Kashiwa Reysol	Nagoya
19:00 JST (UTC+9)	Yoshida 72'; Tamada 89' (pen.)	Summary	Otsu 38'; Murakami 60'; Popó 82' (pen.)	Stadium: Mizuho Athletic Stadium; Attendance: 9,355; Referee: Yuichi Nishimura

19 September 2009 Round 26	Omiya Ardija	0 – 2	Nagoya Grampus	Saitama
18:00 JST (UTC+9)		Summary	Magnum 28'; Ogawa 78'	Stadium: NACK5 Stadium Ōmiya; Attendance: 12,523; Referee: Tsutomu Anazawa

26 September 2009 Round 27	Kashima Antlers	1 – 4	Nagoya Grampus	Kashima
18:00 JST (UTC+9)	Marquinhos 74'	Summary	Kennedy 7'; Burzanović 15', 83'; Sugimoto 55'	Stadium: Kashima Soccer Stadium; Attendance: 17,192; Referee: Hiroyoshi Takayama

4 October 2009 Round 28	Nagoya Grampus	1 – 2	F.C. Tokyo	Nagoya
16:00 JST (UTC+9)	Yoshida 19'	Summary	Ishikawa 26'; Suzuki 31'	Stadium: Mizuho Athletic Stadium; Attendance: 13,796; Referee: Kenji Ogiya

17 October 2009 Round 29	Yokohama F. Marinos	2 – 1	Nagoya Grampus	Yokohama
19:00 JST (UTC+9)	Sakata 31'; Kano 90'	Summary	Yoshida 6'	Stadium: Nissan Stadium; Attendance: 22,046; Referee: Itaru Hirose

25 October 2009 Round 30	Nagoya Grampus	3 – 3	Júbilo Iwata	Toyota
14:00 JST (UTC+9)	Ohi 61' (o.g.); Kennedy 75'; Tamada 80' (pen.); Burzanović (yellow card) 25' (yellow-red card) 88'	Summary	Maeda 32', 40', 48'	Stadium: Toyota Stadium; Attendance: 15,578; Referee: Masaaki Iemoto

8 November 2009 Round 31	Nagoya Grampus	1 – 0	Vissel Kobe	Nagoya
13:00 JST (UTC+9)	Burzanović 16'	Summary	Kim Nam-Il (red card) 60'	Stadium: Mizuho Athletic Stadium; Attendance: 10,136; Referee: Nobutsugu Murakami

21 November 2009 Round 32	Sanfrecce Hiroshima	0 – 0	Nagoya Grampus	Hiroshima
17:00 JST (UTC+9)		Summary		Stadium: Hiroshima Big Arch; Attendance: 13,728; Referee: Hiroyoshi Takayama

28 November 2009 Round 33	Nagoya Grampus	2 – 0	Montedio Yamagata	Toyota
14:00 JST (UTC+9)	Ogawa 11'; Magnum 77'	Summary		Stadium: Toyota Stadium; Attendance: 15,071; Referee: Yuichi Nishimura

5 December 2009 Round 34	Shimizu S-Pulse	0 – 0	Nagoya Grampus	Shizuoka
15:30 JST (UTC+9)		Summary	Magnum (yellow card) 80' (yellow-red card) 81'	Stadium: Outsourcing Stadium Nihondaira; Attendance: 17,218; Referee: Masayoshi Okada

==== League table ====
Pos	Team	Pld	W	D	L	GF	GA	GD	Pts
7	Shimizu S-Pulse	34	13	12	9	44	41	+3	51
8	Albirex Niigata	34	13	11	10	42	31	+11	50
9	Nagoya Grampus	34	14	8	12	46	42	+4	50
10	Yokohama F. Marinos	34	11	13	10	43	37	+6	46
11	Júbilo Iwata	34	11	8	15	50	60	−10	41

Updated to match(es) played on December 5, 2009. Source: J.League Division 1
Rules for classification: 1) points; 2) goal difference; 3) number of goals scored.

=== J. League Cup ===
15 July 2009 Quarterfinal 1st leg	F.C. Tokyo	5 – 1	Nagoya Grampus	Chōfu
19:30 JST (UTC+9)	Hirayama 3'; Yonemoto 10'; Ishikawa 11'; Nagatomo 26'; 75' (o.g.)	(Report)	Ogawa 53'	Stadium: Ajinomoto Stadium; Attendance: 12,226; Referee: Kazuhiko Matsumura

29 July 2009 Quarterfinal 2nd leg	Nagoya Grampus	2 – 1 (3 – 6 agg.)	F.C. Tokyo	Nagoya
19:00 JST (UTC+9)	Maki 33'; Yoshida 65'	(Report)	Hirayama 85'	Stadium: Mizuho Athletic Stadium; Attendance: 6,463; Referee: Joji Kashihara

=== Emperor's Cup ===
10 October 2009 Second round	Nagoya Grampus	4 – 0	Okinawa Kariyushi F.C.	Kariya
13:00 JST (UTC+9)	Alex 42' (pen.); Burzanović 68', 80'; Maki 86'	Report		Stadium: Kariya Municipal Athletic Park; Attendance: 2,503; Referee: Akio Okutani

1 November 2009 Third round	Nagoya Grampus	2 – 0	Honda Lock	Nagoya
15:00 JST (UTC+9)	Yoshimura 68'; 78' (o.g.)	Report		Stadium: Mizuho Athletic Stadium; Attendance: 2,807; Referee: Tomohiro Igami

15 November 2009 Fourth round	Nagoya Grampus	3 – 1	Júbilo Iwata	Nagoya
15:00 JST (UTC+9)	Yoshimura 42'; Yoshida 52'; Sugimoto 83'	Report	Cullen 5'	Stadium: Mizuho Athletic Stadium; Attendance: 6,091; Referee: Hajime Matsuo

13 December 2009 Quarterfinal	Nagoya Grampus	3 – 0	FC Gifu	Nagoya
15:00 JST (UTC+9)	Kennedy 44', 67', 81'	Report		Stadium: Mizuho Athletic Stadium; Attendance: 12,211; Referee: Ryuji Sato

29 December 2009 Semifinal	Shimizu S-Pulse	1 – 1 (a.e.t.) (3 – 5 p)	Nagoya Grampus	Fukuroi
13:00 JST (UTC+9)	Okazaki 16'	Report	Tamada 56' (pen.)	Stadium: Shizuoka Stadium; Attendance: 19,578; Referee: Masaaki Iemoto
	Penalties
	Ichikawa (penalty missed); Kodama (penalty scored); Hara (penalty scored); Okazaki (penalty scored)		(penalty scored) Kennedy; (penalty scored) Alex; (penalty scored) K. Tamada; (penalty scored) Ogawa; (penalty scored) Sugimoto

1 January 2010 Final	Gamba Osaka	4 – 1	Nagoya Grampus	Tokyo
14:00 JST (UTC+9)	Lucas 6'; Endo 77', 90+2'; Futagawa 86'	Report	Nakamura 40'	Stadium: National Stadium; Attendance: 42,140; Referee: Kenji Oogiya

=== AFC Champions League ===
==== Group stage ====
Pos	Team	Pld	W	D	L	GF	GA	GD	Pts	Qualification
1	(Japan) Nagoya Grampus	6	3	3	0	10	4	+6	12	Advance to knockout stage
2	(Australia) Newcastle Jets	6	3	1	2	6	5	+1	10	Advance to knockout stage
3	(South Korea) Ulsan Hyundai Horang-i	6	2	0	4	4	10	−6	6	
4	(China) Beijing Guoan	6	1	2	3	4	5	−1	5	

Source: WorldFootball.net

10 March 2009 Group stage	Ulsan Hyundai Horang-i (South Korea)	1 – 3	(Japan) Nagoya Grampus	Ulsan, South Korea
19:30 JST (UTC+9)	Cho Jin-Soo 25'	Report	Yoshida 54'; Davi 77'; Magnum 87'	Stadium: Munsu Cup Stadium; Attendance: 3,156; Referee: Chaiya Mahapab (Thailand)

17 March 2009 Group stage	Nagoya Grampus (Japan)	0 – 0	(China) Beijing Guoan	Nagoya, Japan
19:00 JST (UTC+9)		Report		Stadium: Mizuho Athletic Stadium; Attendance: 7,374; Referee: Hasan Tayeb Shamsuzzaman (Bangladesh)

7 April 2009 Group stage	Nagoya Grampus (Japan)	1 – 1	(Australia) Newcastle United Jets	Nagoya, Japan
19:00 JST (UTC+9)	Tamada 65'	Report	Elrich 9'	Stadium: Mizuho Athletic Stadium; Attendance: 7,198; Referee: Khalil Al-Ghamdi (Saudi Arabia)

22 April 2009 Group stage	Newcastle United Jets (Australia)	0 – 1	(Japan) Nagoya Grampus	Newcastle, Australia
19:00 JST (UTC+9)		Report	Ogawa 57'	Stadium: EnergyAustralia Stadium; Attendance: 8,492; Referee: Ali Al-Badwawi (UAE)

6 May 2009 Group stage	Nagoya Grampus (Japan)	4 – 1	(South Korea) Ulsan Hyundai Horang-i	Nagoya, Japan
15:00 JST (UTC+9)	Ogawa 14', 72'; Maki 23'; Davi 59'	Report	Kim Shin-Wook 42'	Stadium: Mizuho Athletic Stadium; Attendance: 9,049; Referee: Subkhiddin Mohd Salleh (Malaysia)

20 May 2009 Group stage	Beijing Guoan (China)	1 – 1	(Japan) Nagoya Grampus	Beijing, China
20:00 JST (UTC+9)	Guo Hui 81'	Report	Niikawa 35'	Stadium: Workers Stadium, Beijing; Attendance: 14,080; Referee: Mohsen Torky (Iran)

==== Knockout stage ====
===== Round of 16 =====
24 June 2009 Round of 16	Nagoya Grampus (Japan)	2 – 1	(South Korea) Suwon Bluewings	Nagoya, Japan
19:00 JST (UTC+9)	Ogawa 22'; Tamada 66'	Report	Edu 69'	Stadium: Mizuho Athletic Stadium; Attendance: 6,859; Referee: Ravshan Irmatov (Uzbekistan)

===== Quarter-final =====
23 September 2009 First leg	Kawasaki Frontale (Japan)	2 – 1	(Japan) Nagoya Grampus	Tokyo, Japan
15:00 JST (UTC+9)	K. Nakamura 60'; Juninho 63'	Report	Kennedy 28'	Stadium: National Stadium; Attendance: 17,939; Referee: Sun Baojie (China)

30 September 2009 Second leg	Nagoya Grampus (Japan)	3 – 1 (4 – 3 agg.)	(Japan) Kawasaki Frontale	Nagoya, Japan
19:00 JST (UTC+9)	Ogawa 26'; Yoshida 35'; Kennedy 88'	Report	Chong Tese 38'	Stadium: Mizuho Athletic Stadium; Attendance: 8,796; Referee: Abdullah Balideh (Qatar)

===== Semi-final =====
22 October 2009 First leg	Al-Ittihad (Saudi Arabia)	6 – 2	(Japan) Nagoya Grampus	Jeddah, Saudi Arabia
1:50 JST (UTC+9)	Ahmed Hadid 24'; Noor 65', 76', 90+1'; Leguizamón 83'; Chermiti 90+3'	Report	Kennedy 14'; N. Nakamura 33'	Stadium: Prince Abdullah al-Faisal Stadium; Attendance: 18,265; Referee: Ali Al-Badwawi (UAE)

28 October 2009 Second leg	Nagoya Grampus (Japan)	1 – 2 (2 – 8 agg.)	(Saudi Arabia) Al-Ittihad	Nagoya, Japan
19:00 JST (UTC+9)	Sugimoto 67'	Report	Al-Saqri 43'; Chermiti 59'	Stadium: Mizuho Athletic Stadium; Attendance: 11,046; Referee: Masoud Moradi (Iran)

== Player statistics ==
=== Appearances and goals ===
No.	Pos	Nat	Player	Total		J League		J League Cup		Emperor's Cup		AFC Champions League	
No.	Pos	Nat	Player	Apps	Goals	Apps	Goals	Apps	Goals	Apps	Goals	Apps	Goals
1	GK	(Japan) JPN	Seigo Narazaki	32	0	26+0	0	0+0	0	0+0	0	6+0	0
2	DF	(Japan) JPN	Akira Takeuchi	21	0	13+0	0	1+0	0	1+0	0	4+2	0
3	DF	(Serbia) SRB	Miloš Bajalica	18	0	13+0	0	1+0	0	1+0	0	2+1	0
4	DF	(Japan) JPN	Maya Yoshida	43	8	30+0	4	1+0	1	1+0	1	11+0	2
5	DF	(Japan) JPN	Takahiro Masukawa	37	0	27+0	0	1+0	0	1+0	0	8+0	0
6	DF	(Japan) JPN	Shohei Abe	42	0	32+0	0	1+0	0	1+0	0	8+0	0
7	MF	(Japan) JPN	Naoshi Nakamura	41	1	30+0	0	1+0	0	1+0	0	7+2	1
8	MF	(Brazil) BRA	Magnum	32	5	22+0	4	1+0	0	1+0	0	7+1	1
9	FW	(Montenegro) MNE	Igor Burzanović	18	3	13+0	3	0+0	0	1+0	0	2+2	0
10	MF	(Japan) JPN	Yoshizumi Ogawa	46	7	33+0	3	1+0	1	2+0	1	10+0	2
11	FW	(Japan) JPN	Keiji Tamada	39	10	27+0	8	0+1	0	0+1	0	7+3	2
13	MF	(Japan) JPN	Kei Yamaguchi	36	0	24+0	0	1+1	0	1+1	0	5+3	0
14	MF	(Japan) JPN	Keiji Yoshimura	42	1	30+0	1	2+0	0	2+0	0	6+2	0
16	FW	(Australia) AUS	Joshua Kennedy	21	9	15+0	6	1+0	0	1+0	0	4+0	3
17	FW	(Japan) JPN	Yuki Maki	27	5	21+0	2	1+0	1	1+0	1	3+1	1
18	FW	(Japan) JPN	Tomohiro Tsuda	17	1	11+0	1	0+2	0	0+2	0	2+0	0
19	FW	(Japan) JPN	Keita Sugimoto	38	3	27+0	2	2+0	0	2+0	0	2+5	1
20	MF	(Japan) JPN	Yoshiki Hiraki	0	0	0+0	0	0+0	0	0+0	0	0+0	0
21	GK	(Japan) JPN	Koji Nishimura	4	0	1+0	0	1+0	0	1+0	0	1+0	0
22	MF	(Japan) JPN	Koji Hashimoto	2	0	1+0	0	0+0	0	0+0	0	0+1	0
23	DF	(Japan) JPN	Genta Matsuo	2	0	0+0	0	0+0	0	0+0	0	2+0	0
24	MF	(Japan) JPN	Shinta Fukushima	4	0	3+0	0	0+0	0	0+0	0	1+0	0
25	FW	(Japan) JPN	Oribe Niikawa	1	1	0+0	0	0+0	0	0+0	0	1+0	1
26	DF	(Japan) JPN	Masaya Sato	11	0	2+0	0	1+1	0	1+1	0	3+2	0
27	MF	(Japan) JPN	Sho Hanai	5	0	2+0	0	0+0	0	0+0	0	2+1	0
28	MF	(Japan) JPN	Taishi Taguchi	4	0	1+0	0	1+0	0	0+1	0	0+1	0
29	FW	(Japan) JPN	Hikaru Kuba	0	0	0+0	0	0+0	0	0+0	0	0+0	0
30	GK	(Japan) JPN	Koichi Hirono	10	0	6+0	0	1+0	0	1+0	0	2+0	0
31	GK	(Japan) JPN	Toru Hasegawa	2	0	1+0	0	0+0	0	0+0	0	1+0	0
32	DF	(Japan) JPN	Hayuma Tanaka	41	0	29+0	0	2+0	0	2+0	0	7+1	0
33	MF	(Japan) JPN	Ryota Isomura	0	0	0+0	0	0+0	0	0+0	0	0+0	0
38	MF	(Japan) JPN	Alessandro Santos	18	0	14+0	0	0+0	0	0+0	0	2+2	0
Players who appeared for Nagoya Grampus, but left during the season:
9	FW	(Brazil) BRA	Davi	24	12	17+0	10	1+0	0	0+0	0	6+0	2

=== Goal Scorers ===
Place	Position	Nation	Number	Name	J-League	J-League Cup	Emperor's Cup	AFC Champions League	Total
1	FW	(Brazil)	9	Davi	10	0	0	2	12
2	FW	(Australia)	16	Joshua Kennedy	6	0	3	3	12
2	FW	(Japan)	11	Keiji Tamada	8	0	1	2	11
3	MF	(Japan)	10	Yoshizumi Ogawa	3	1	0	5	10
4	DF	(Japan)	4	Maya Yoshida	4	1	1	2	8
5	MF	(Brazil)	8	Magnum	4	0	0	1	5
5	MF	(Montenegro)	9	Igor Burzanović	3	0	2	0	5
5	FW	(Japan)	17	Yuki Maki	2	1	1	1	5
8	FW	(Japan)	19	Keita Sugimoto	2	0	1	1	4
9				Own goal	2	0	1	0	3
9	MF	(Japan)	14	Keiji Yoshimura	1	0	2	0	3
11	MF	(Japan)	7	Naoshi Nakamura	0	0	1	1	2
12	FW	(Japan)	18	Tomohiro Tsuda	1	0	0	0	1
12	MF	(Brazil)	38	Alessandro Santos	0	0	1	0	1
12	FW	(Japan)	25	Oribe Niikawa	0	0	0	1	1
				TOTALS	46	3	14	19	93

=== Disciplinary record ===
Number	Nation	Position	Name	J-League		J. League Cup		Emperor's Cup		AFC Champions League		Total	
Number	Nation	Position	Name	Yellow card	Red card	Yellow card	Red card	Yellow card	Red card	Yellow card	Red card	Yellow card	Red card
1	(Japan)	GK	Seigo Narazaki	1	0	0	0	0	0	0	0	1	0
2	(Japan)	DF	Akira Takeuchi	3	0	1	0	0	0	1	0	5	0
3	(Serbia)	DF	Miloš Bajalica	2	0	0	0	0	0	0	0	2	0
4	(Japan)	DF	Maya Yoshida	2	0	0	0	0	0	1	0	3	0
5	(Japan)	DF	Takahiro Masukawa	5	0	0	0	0	0	1	0	6	0
6	(Japan)	DF	Shohei Abe	2	0	0	0	1	0	0	0	3	0
7	(Japan)	MF	Naoshi Nakamura	8	0	0	0	1	0	1	0	10	0
8	(Brazil)	MF	Magnum	8	3	0	0	0	0	2	0	10	3
9	(Brazil)	FW	Davi	4	0	0	0	0	0	1	0	5	0
9	(Montenegro)	MF	Igor Burzanović	6	1	0	0	0	0	0	0	6	1
10	(Japan)	MF	Yoshizumi Ogawa	5	1	0	0	1	0	1	0	7	1
11	(Japan)	FW	Keiji Tamada	1	0	0	0	0	0	1	0	2	0
13	(Japan)	MF	Kei Yamaguchi	1	0	0	0	0	0	1	0	1	0
14	(Japan)	MF	Keiji Yoshimura	5	0	1	0	1	0	2	0	9	0
16	(Australia)	FW	Joshua Kennedy	2	0	0	0	1	0	1	0	4	0
16	(Japan)	FW	Yuki Maki	1	0	0	0	0	0	0	0	1	0
19	(Japan)	FW	Keita Sugimoto	2	0	0	0	0	0	1	0	4	0
26	(Japan)	FW	Masaya Sato	1	0	0	0	0	0	0	0	1	0
30	(Japan)	FW	Koichi Hirono	1	0	0	0	0	0	0	0	1	0
32	(Japan)	DF	Hayuma Tanaka	3	0	1	0	1	0	1	0	6	0
38	(Japan)	MF	Alessandro Santos	3	0	0	0	1	0	1	0	5	0
			TOTALS	66	5	3	0	7	0	13	0	89	5
