= 2009 Emperor's Cup final =

2009 Emperor's Cup Final
Gamba Osaka	Nagoya Grampus
4	1
- Date: January 1, 2010
- Venue: National Stadium, Tokyo

2009 Emperor's Cup Final was the 89th final of the Emperor's Cup competition. The final was played at National Stadium in Tokyo on January 1, 2010. Gamba Osaka won the championship.

== Match details ==
January 1, 2010

Gamba Osaka	4–1	Nagoya Grampus
Lucas 6'; Yasuhito Endō 77', 89'; Takahiro Futagawa 86'	Report	Naoshi Nakamura 40'

National Stadium

Gamba Osaka
GK	1	(Japan) Naoki Matsuyo
DF	21	(Japan) Akira Kaji
DF	2	(Japan) Sota Nakazawa
DF	5	(Japan) Satoshi Yamaguchi
DF	13	(Japan) Michihiro Yasuda
MF	17	(Japan) Tomokazu Myojin
MF	27	(Japan) Hideo Hashimoto
MF	7	(Japan) Yasuhito Endō
MF	10	(Japan) Takahiro Futagawa
FW	9	(Brazil) Lucas
FW	30	(Japan) Masato Yamazaki	(substituted off) 70'
Substitutes:
GK	29	(Japan) Atsushi Kimura
DF	19	(Japan) Takumi Shimohira
MF	8	(Japan) Shinichi Terada
MF	16	(Japan) Hayato Sasaki
FW	14	(Japan) Shoki Hirai
FW	18	(South Korea) Cho Jae-jin	(substituted on) 70'
FW	11	(Japan) Ryūji Bando
Manager:
(Japan) Akira Nishino

Nagoya Grampus
GK	1	(Japan) Seigo Narazaki
DF	32	(Japan) Hayuma Tanaka
DF	3	(Serbia) Bajalica
DF	4	(Japan) Maya Yoshida
DF	6	(Japan) Shohei Abe
MF	10	(Japan) Yoshizumi Ogawa	(substituted off) 65'
MF	7	(Japan) Naoshi Nakamura	(substituted off) 80'
MF	14	(Japan) Keiji Yoshimura	(substituted off) 80'
MF	8	(Brazil) Magnum
FW	11	(Japan) Keiji Tamada
FW	16	(Australia) Kennedy
Substitutes:
GK	21	(Japan) Koji Nishimura
DF	5	(Japan) Takahiro Masukawa
DF	38	(Japan) Alessandro Santos	(substituted on) 80'
MF	9	(Montenegro) Burzanovic	(substituted on) 65'
MF	13	(Japan) Kei Yamaguchi
FW	17	(Japan) Yuki Maki	(substituted on) 80'
FW	19	(Japan) Keita Sugimoto
Manager:
(Serbia) Stojković

== See also ==
- 2009 Emperor's Cup
