= 2008 Nagoya Grampus season =

Nagoya Grampus
2008 season
- Chairman: Toyo Kato
- Manager: Dragan Stojković
- Stadium: Mizuho Athletic Stadium
- J. League 1: 3rd
- Emperor's Cup: Quarterfinals vs Gamba Osaka
- J. League Cup: Semifinals vs Oita Trinita
- Top goalscorer: League: Frode Johnsen (12); All: Frode Johnsen (16)

The 2008 Nagoya Grampus season was Nagoya Grampus' 16th season in the J. League Division 1 and 27th overall in the Japanese top flight. They also participated in the 2008 J. League Cup, being knocked out at the Semifinal stage by Oita Trinita, and the 2008 Emperor's Cup getting knocked out at the Quarterfinal stage by Gamba Osaka.

== Squad ==
Note: Flags indicate national team as defined under FIFA eligibility rules; some limited exceptions apply. Players may hold more than one non-FIFA nationality.

No.	Pos.	Nation	Player
1	GK	JPN	Seigo Narazaki
2	DF	JPN	Takashi Miki
3	DF	SRB	Miloš Bajalica
4	MF	JPN	Masayuki Omori
5	DF	JPN	Atsushi Yoneyama
6	DF	JPN	Shohei Abe
7	MF	JPN	Naoshi Nakamura
8	MF	BRA	Magnum
9	FW	NOR	Frode Johnsen
10	MF	JPN	Toshiya Fujita
11	FW	JPN	Keiji Tamada
13	MF	JPN	Kei Yamaguchi
14	MF	JPN	Keiji Yoshimura
16	DF	JPN	Takahiro Masukawa
17	FW	JPN	Yuki Maki
18	FW	JPN	Masaki Fukai
19	FW	JPN	Keita Sugimoto

No.	Pos.	Nation	Player
21	GK	JPN	Koji Nishimura
22	DF	JPN	Kazuto Tsuyuki
26	FW	JPN	Tomohiro Tsuda
27	DF	JPN	Shosuke Katayama
28	MF	JPN	Keiji Watanabe
29	MF	JPN	Yoshizumi Ogawa
30	DF	JPN	Akira Takeuchi
31	MF	JPN	Sho Hanai
32	MF	JPN	Jun Aoyama
33	MF	JPN	Masaya Sato
34	DF	JPN	Maya Yoshida
35	MF	JPN	Wataru Inoue
36	GK	JPN	Koichi Hirono
37	GK	JPN	Toru Hasegawa
38	FW	JPN	Oribe Niikawa
39	MF	JPN	Shinta Fukushima

== Transfers ==
=== Winter ===
In: Note: Flags indicate national team as defined under FIFA eligibility rules; some limited exceptions apply. Players may hold more than one non-FIFA nationality.

No.	Pos.	Nation	Player
2	DF	JPN	Takashi Miki (From (Japan) Oita Trinita)
3	DF	SRB	Miloš Bajalica (From (Serbia) Red Star Belgrade)
8	MF	BRA	Magnum (From (Japan) Kawasaki Frontale)
21	GK	JPN	Koji Nishimura (From (Japan) Kyoto Sanga)
31	MF	JPN	Sho Hanai (From youth team)
33	MF	JPN	Masaya Sato (From (Japan) Hamana High School)

Out: Note: Flags indicate national team as defined under FIFA eligibility rules; some limited exceptions apply. Players may hold more than one non-FIFA nationality.

No.	Pos.	Nation	Player
3	DF	SVK	Marek Špilár (Retired)
8	MF	KOR	Kim Jung-Woo (to (South Korea) Seongnam Ilhwa Chunma)
15	FW	JPN	Sho Kamogawa (to (Japan) Fagiano Okayama)
18	MF	JPN	Shunichi Nakajima (to (Japan) Ryukyu)
20	DF	JPN	Seiji Kaneko (End of loan from (Japan) Kashima Antlers)
21	GK	JPN	Ryo Kushino (End of loan from (Japan) JEF United Ichihara Chiba)
24	MF	JPN	Keisuke Honda (to (Netherlands) VVV-Venlo)
25	MF	JPN	Yusuke Sudo (On loan to (Japan) Yokohama)
33	MF	JPN	Shingo Wada (Released)

== Competitions ==
=== J.League ===
==== Results ====
8 March 2008 1	Nagoya Grampus	1 - 1	Kyoto Sanga	Toyota
14:04 JST (UTC+9)	Johnsen 42'	Summary	Paulinho 9'	Stadium: Toyota Stadium; Attendance: 26,102

15 March 2008 2	Urawa Red Diamonds	0 - 2	Nagoya Grampus	Saitama
14:04 JST (UTC+9)		Summary	Johnsen 14'; Ogawa 68'	Stadium: Saitama Stadium 2002; Attendance: 54,482

30 March 2008 3	Nagoya Grampus	2 - 1	Oita Trinita	Nagoya
19:03 JST (UTC+9)	Tamada 3'; Magnum 70'	Summary	Mu Kanazaki 39'	Stadium: Mizuho Athletic Stadium; Attendance: 8,764

2 April 2008 4	Omiya Ardija	1 - 2	Nagoya Grampus	Saitama
19:04 JST (UTC+9)	Tomita 26'	Summary	Masukawa 56'; Magnum 57'	Stadium: NACK5 Stadium Ōmiya; Attendance: 8,321

5 April 2008 5	Nagoya Grampus	2 - 0	Yokohama F. Marinos	Toyota
16:03 JST (UTC+9)	Johnsen 32'; Sugimoto 89'	Summary		Stadium: Toyota Stadium; Attendance: 19,193

12 April 2008 6	Shimizu S-Pulse	0 - 2	Nagoya Grampus	Shizuoka
14:03 JST (UTC+9)		Summary	Ogawa 10'; Sugimoto 89'	Stadium: Outsourcing Stadium Nihondaira; Attendance: 14,167

19 April 2008 7	Nagoya Grampus	3 - 2	JEF United	Nagoya
13:03 JST (UTC+9)	Johnsen 10', 67'; Sugimoto 78'	Summary	Maki 12'; Ito 22'	Stadium: Mizuho Athletic Stadium; Attendance: 12,214

26 April 2008 8	Tokyo Verdy	2 - 0	Nagoya Grampus	Chōfu
14:05 JST (UTC+9)	Diego Silva 54'; Kawano 72'	Summary		Stadium: Ajinomoto Stadium; Attendance: 11,997

29 April 2008 9	Nagoya Grampus	1 - 2	Kawasaki Frontale	Nagoya
19:03 JST (UTC+9)	Johnsen 21'	Summary	Murakami 28'; Juninho 36'	Stadium: Mizuho Athletic Stadium; Attendance: 15,061

3 May 2008 10	Nagoya Grampus	1 - 2	Gamba Osaka	Toyota
14:03 JST (UTC+9)	Ogawa 33'	Summary	Baré 24', 69'	Stadium: Toyota Stadium; Attendance: 34,436

6 May 2008 11	Tokyo	0 - 1	Nagoya Grampus	Chōfu
15:04 JST (UTC+9)		Summary	Sugimoto 17'	Stadium: Ajinomoto Stadium; Attendance: 30,825

10 May 2008 12	Nagoya Grampus	0 - 0	Vissel Kobe	Nagoya
19:03 JST (UTC+9)		Summary		Stadium: Mizuho Athletic Stadium; Attendance: 7,353

17 May 2008 13	Consadole Sapporo	1 - 3	Nagoya Grampus	Sapporo
13:04 JST (UTC+9)	Miyazawa 16'	Summary	Magnum 50'; Tamada 69'; Johnsen 80'	Stadium: Sapporo Dome; Attendance: 16,631

28 June 2008 14	Nagoya Grampus	0 - 4	Kashima Antlers	Nagoya
19:01 JST (UTC+9)		Summary	Marquinhos 4', 90'; Ogasawara 28'; Danilo 79'	Stadium: Mizuho Athletic Stadium; Attendance: 18,215

5 July 2008 15	Albirex Niigata	2 - 1	Nagoya Grampus	Niigata
19:03 JST (UTC+9)	Matsushita 59'; Yano 83'	Summary	Masukawa 74'	Stadium: Tohoku Denryoku Big Swan Stadium; Attendance: 37,529

12 July 2008 16	Nagoya Grampus	1 - 0	Kashiwa Reysol	Nagoya
19:03 JST (UTC+9)	Johnsen 64'	Summary	Koga (yellow card) (yellow-red card)	Stadium: Mizuho Athletic Stadium; Attendance: 11,717

17 July 2008 17	Júbilo Iwata	2 - 1	Nagoya Grampus	Iwata
19:00 JST (UTC+9)	Chano 47'; Naruoka 49'	Summary	Ogawa 4'	Stadium: Yamaha Stadium; Attendance: 8,216

21 July 2008 18	Nagoya Grampus	4 - 0	Omiya Ardija	Nagoya
19:03 JST (UTC+9)	Yoshimura 16'; Magnum 28'; Johnsen 48'; Sugimoto 89'	Summary		Stadium: Mizuho Athletic Stadium; Attendance: 9,578

26 July 2008 19	Kawasaki Frontale	1 - 1	Nagoya Grampus	Kawasaki
19:04 JST (UTC+9)	Juninho 52'	Summary	Magnum 13'	Stadium: Todoroki Athletics Stadium; Attendance: 21,952

9 August 2008 20	Nagoya Grampus	0 - 1	Tokyo	Nagoya
19:03 JST (UTC+9)		Summary	Hirayama 35'	Stadium: Mizuho Athletic Stadium; Attendance: 12,269

16 August 2008 21	Vissel Kobe	1 - 2	Nagoya Grampus	Kobe
19:03 JST (UTC+9)	Leandro 81'	Summary	Ogawa 13', 89'	Stadium: Home's Stadium Kobe; Attendance: 12,799

23 August 2008 22	Kashima Antlers	1 - 2	Nagoya Grampus	Kashima
18:34 JST (UTC+9)	Marquinhos 3'	Summary	Yoshida 11'; Yoneyama 61' (pen.)	Stadium: Kashima Soccer Stadium; Attendance: 19,868

27 August 2008 23	Nagoya Grampus	3 - 2	Shimizu S-Pulse	Nagoya
19:03 JST (UTC+9)	Tamada 23', 52'; Magnum 49'	Summary	Okazaki 6'; Yajima 46'	Stadium: Mizuho Athletic Stadium; Attendance: 10,071

13 September 2008 24	Gamba Osaka	0 - 1	Nagoya Grampus	Suita
19:03 JST (UTC+9)		Summary	Ogawa 10'	Stadium: Osaka Expo '70 Stadium; Attendance: 19,627

20 September 2008 25	Nagoya Grampus	2 - 0	Albirex Niigata	Nagoya
19:03 JST (UTC+9)	Ogawa 50'; Sugimoto 90'	Summary		Stadium: Mizuho Athletic Stadium; Attendance: 12,095

23 September 2008 26	JEF United Chiba	2 - 1	Nagoya Grampus	Chiba
19:04 JST (UTC+9)	Yazawa 47'; Fukai 48'	Summary	Yoshizumi Ogawa\Ogawa 39'	Stadium: Fukuda Denshi Arena; Attendance: 15,266

28 September 2008 27	Nagoya Grampus	1 - 1	Urawa Red Diamonds	Nagoya
19:03 JST (UTC+9)	Maki 47'	Summary	Edmilson 40'	Stadium: Mizuho Athletic Stadium; Attendance: 19,811

5 October 2008 28	Nagoya Grampus	1 - 1	Tokyo Verdy	Nagoya
16:03 JST (UTC+9)	Johnsen 89'	Summary	Tsuchiya 40'	Stadium: Mizuho Athletic Stadium; Attendance: 14,481

19 October 2008 29	Yokohama F. Marinos	0 - 0	Nagoya Grampus	Yokohama
16:03 JST (UTC+9)		Summary		Stadium: Nissan Stadium; Attendance: 26,229

25 October 2008 30	Nagoya Grampus	0 - 0	Júbilo Iwata	Toyota
15:03 JST (UTC+9)		Summary		Stadium: Toyota Stadium; Attendance: 30,192

8 November 2008 31	Kashiwa Reysol	2 - 1	Nagoya Grampus	Kashiwa
14:05 JST (UTC+9)	Suganuma 79'; Popó 81'	Summary	Ogawa 32'	Stadium: Hitachi Kashiwa Soccer Stadium; Attendance: 10,519

23 November 2008 32	Kyoto Sanga	2 - 3	Nagoya Grampus	Kyoto
13:04 JST (UTC+9)	Yanagisawa 56', 67'	Summary	Magnum 1', 25'; Johnsen 89'	Stadium: Nishikyogoku Athletic Stadium; Attendance: 18,355

30 November 2008 33	Nagoya Grampus	3 - 1	Consadole Sapporo	Nagoya
16:04 JST (UTC+9)	Ogawa 6'; Sugimoto 12'; Yoneyama 89'	Summary	Davi 70'	Stadium: Mizuho Athletic Stadium; Attendance: 19,890

6 December 2008 34	Oita Trinita	0 - 0	Nagoya Grampus	Ōita
14:34 JST (UTC+9)		Summary		Stadium: Ōita Bank Dome; Attendance: 28,831

==== Table ====
Pos	Team	Pld	W	D	L	GF	GA	GD	Pts	Qualification or relegation
1	Kashima Antlers (C)	34	18	9	7	56	30	+26	63	Qualification for 2009 AFC Champions League Group stage
2	Kawasaki Frontale	34	18	6	10	65	42	+23	60	Qualification for 2009 AFC Champions League Group stage
3	Nagoya Grampus	34	17	8	9	48	35	+13	59	Qualification for 2009 AFC Champions League Group stage
4	Oita Trinita	34	16	8	10	33	24	+9	56	Qualification for Pan-Pacific Championship 2009 (Note: Qualified as the winner of 2008 J.League Cup.)
5	Shimizu S-Pulse	34	16	7	11	50	42	+8	55	

Updated to match(es) played on December 6, 2008. Source: J. League Division 1
Rules for classification: 1) points; 2) goal difference; 3) number of goals scored.
(C) Champions

=== Emperor's Cup ===
2 November 2008 Fourth Round	Nagoya Grampus	1– 0	F.C. Gifu	Toyota
13:00 JST (UTC+9)	Yoshida 89'			Stadium: Toyota Stadium; Attendance: 7,597

15 November 2008 Fifth Round	Omiya Ardija	1– 2	Nagoya Grampus	Ōmiya
13:00 JST (UTC+9)	Uchida 25'		Johnsen 2', 34'	Stadium: NACK5 Stadium; Attendance: 4,371

25 December 2008 Quarter-finals	Gamba Osaka	2– 1	Nagoya Grampus	Kobe
19:00 JST (UTC+9)	Lucas 13'; Nakazawa 22'		Sugimoto 70'	Stadium: Kobe Universiade Memorial Stadium; Attendance: 4,955; Referee: Toshimitsu Yoshida

=== J.League Cup ===
==== Group stage ====
Team	Pld	W	D	L	GF	GA	GD	Pts
Nagoya Grampus	6	5	0	1	14	5	+9	15
Vissel Kobe	6	3	1	2	5	5	0	10
Kyoto Sanga FC	6	1	3	2	7	8	−1	6
Urawa Red Diamonds	6	0	2	4	8	16	−8	2

20 March 2008 1	Nagoya Grampus	0 – 1	Kyoto Sanga	Nagoya
14:00 JST (UTC+9)			Ataliba 79'	Stadium: Mizuho Athletic Stadium; Attendance: 5,410; Referee: Hirofumi Yamanishi

23 March 2008 2	Vissel Kobe	0 – 1	Nagoya Grampus	Kobe
15:00 JST (UTC+9)			Maki 86'	Stadium: Home's Stadium Kobe; Attendance: 6,051; Referee: Joji Kashihara

16 April 2008 3	Nagoya Grampus	2 – 0	Vissel Kobe	Nagoya
19:00 JST (UTC+9)	Sugimoto 68'; Fujita 76'			Stadium: Mizuho Athletic Stadium; Attendance: 4,154; Referee: Kenji Ogiya

25 May 2008 4	Nagoya Grampus	4 – 2	Urawa Red Diamonds	Nagoya
19:00 JST (UTC+9)	Ogawa 6'; Sugimoto 14'; Maki 42'; Tsuda 88'		Tanaka 32'; Uchidate 56'	Stadium: Mizuho Athletic Stadium; Attendance: 21,015; Referee: Kazuhiko Matsumura

31 May 2008 5	Kyoto Sanga	1 – 2	Nagoya Grampus	Kyoto
14:00 JST (UTC+9)	Sato 1'		Maki 85'; Tsuda 89'	Stadium: Nishikyogoku Athletic Stadium; Attendance: 8,933; Referee: Hiroyoshi Takayama

8 June 2008 6	Urawa Red Diamonds	1 – 5	Nagoya Grampus	Saitama
15:00 JST (UTC+9)	Umesaki 54'		Ogawa 14'; Sugimoto 61', 76', 87'; Abe 71'	Stadium: Saitama Stadium 2002; Attendance: 35,417; Referee: Masaki Nabeshima

==== Knockout phase ====
2 July 2008 Quarterfinal 1st leg	JEF United Chiba	0 – 1	Nagoya Grampus	Chiba
19:00 JST (UTC+9)		Report	Johnsen 14'	Stadium: Fukuda Denshi Arena; Attendance: 8,472; Referee: Nobutsugu Murakami

6 August 2008 Quarterfinal 2nd leg	Nagoya Grampus	1 – 0	JEF United Chiba	Nagoya
19:00 JST (UTC+9)	Masukawa 60'	Report		Stadium: Mizuho Athletic Stadium; Attendance: 6,344; Referee: Minoru Tojo

3 September 2008 Semifinal 1st leg	Nagoya Grampus	1 – 1	Oita Trinita	Nagoya
19:00 JST (UTC+9)	Johnsen 64'	Report	Ueslei 69'	Stadium: Mizuho Athletic Stadium; Attendance: 7,792; Referee: Hirofumi Yamanishi

7 September 2008 Semifinal 2nd leg	Oita Trinita	1 – 0	Nagoya Grampus	Ōita
18:00 JST (UTC+9)	Ueslei 49'	Report		Stadium: Kyushu Oil Dome; Attendance: 20,371; Referee: Masayoshi Okada

== Player statistics ==
=== Appearances ===
No.	Pos.	Player	D.o.B. (Age)	Height / Weight	J. League 1		Emperor's Cup		J. League Cup		Total	
No.	Pos.	Player	D.o.B. (Age)	Height / Weight	Apps	Goals	Apps	Goals	Apps	Goals	Apps	Goals
1	GK	Seigo Narazaki	April 15, 1976 (aged 31)	cm / kg	30	0	-	-	2	0	32	0
2	DF	Takashi Miki	July 23, 1978 (aged 29)	cm / kg	4	0	-	-	5	0	9	0
3	DF	Miloš Bajalica	December 15, 1981 (aged 26)	cm / kg	26	0	-	-	7	0	33	0
4	DF	Masayuki Omori	November 9, 1976 (aged 31)	cm / kg	0	0	-	-	0	0	0	0
5	DF	Atsushi Yoneyama	November 20, 1976 (aged 31)	cm / kg	18	1	-	-	6	0	24	0
6	DF	Shohei Abe	December 1, 1983 (aged 24)	cm / kg	34	0	-	-	8	1	42	1
7	MF	Naoshi Nakamura	January 27, 1979 (aged 29)	cm / kg	31	0	-	-	6	0	37	0
8	MF	Magnum	March 24, 1982 (aged 25)	cm / kg	26	8	-	-	7	0	33	8
9	FW	Frode Johnsen	March 17, 1974 (aged 33)	cm / kg	34	12	-	2	6	2	40	16
10	MF	Toshiya Fujita	October 4, 1971 (aged 36)	cm / kg	8	0	-	-	4	1	12	1
11	FW	Keiji Tamada	April 11, 1980 (aged 27)	cm / kg	31	4	-	-	2	0	33	0
13	MF	Kei Yamaguchi	June 11, 1983 (aged 24)	cm / kg	22	0	-	-	4	0	26	0
14	MF	Keiji Yoshimura	August 8, 1979 (aged 28)	cm / kg	28	1	-	-	7	0	35	1
16	DF	Takahiro Masukawa	November 8, 1979 (aged 28)	cm / kg	27	2	-	-	9	1	36	3
17	FW	Yuki Maki	June 26, 1984 (aged 23)	cm / kg	16	1	-	-	10	3	26	4
18	FW	Masaki Fukai	September 13, 1980 (aged 27)	cm / kg	5	0	-	-	6	0	11	0
19	FW	Keita Sugimoto	June 13, 1982 (aged 25)	cm / kg	33	7	-	1	9	5	42	13
21	GK	Koji Nishimura	July 7, 1984 (aged 23)	cm / kg	4	0	-	-	8	0	12	0
22	DF	Kazuto Tsuyuki	August 14, 1984 (aged 23)	cm / kg	0	0	-	-	0	0	0	0
26	FW	Tomohiro Tsuda	May 6, 1986 (aged 21)	cm / kg	3	0	-	-	5	2	8	2
27	DF	Shosuke Katayama	September 8, 1983 (aged 24)	cm / kg	1	0	-	-	1	0	2	0
28	DF	Keiji Watanabe	January 28, 1985 (aged 23)	cm / kg	0	0	-	-	1	0	1	0
29	MF	Yoshizumi Ogawa	August 25, 1984 (aged 23)	cm / kg	33	11	-	-	9	2	42	13
30	DF	Akira Takeuchi	June 18, 1983 (aged 24)	cm / kg	31	0	-	-	7	0	38	0
31	MF	Sho Hanai	November 10, 1989 (aged 18)	cm / kg	4	0	-	-	1	0	5	0
32	MF	Jun Aoyama	January 3, 1988 (aged 20)	cm / kg	1	0	-	-	2	0	3	0
33	MF	Masaya Sato	February 10, 1990 (aged 18)	cm / kg	0	0	-	-	1	0	1	0
34	DF	Maya Yoshida	August 24, 1988 (aged 19)	cm / kg	22	1	-	1	4	0	26	2
35	MF	Wataru Inoue	August 7, 1986 (aged 21)	cm / kg	0	0	-	-	0	0	0	0
36	GK	Koichi Hirono	April 16, 1980 (aged 27)	cm / kg	0	0	-	-	0	0	0	-
37	GK	Toru Hasegawa	December 11, 1988 (aged 19)	cm / kg	0	0	-	-	0	0	0	0
38	FW	Oribe Niikawa	July 16, 1988 (aged 19)	cm / kg	1	0	-	-	1	0	2	0
39	MF	Shinta Fukushima	January 28, 1989 (aged 19)	cm / kg	0	0	-	-	0	0	0	0

=== Goal Scorers ===
Place	Position	Nation	Number	Name	J-League	J-League Cup	Emperor's Cup	Total
1	FW	(Norway)	9	Frode Johnsen	12	2	2	16
2	MF	(Japan)	29	Yoshizumi Ogawa	11	2	0	13
2	FW	(Japan)	19	Keita Sugimoto	7	5	1	13
4	MF	(Brazil)	8	Magnum	8	0	0	8
5	MF	(Japan)	11	Keiji Tamada	4	0	0	4
5	FW	(Japan)	17	Yuki Maki	1	3	0	4
7	DF	(Japan)	16	Takahiro Masukawa	2	1	0	3
8	FW	(Japan)	26	Tomohiro Tsuda	0	2	0	2
8	DF	(Japan)	34	Maya Yoshida	1	0	1	2
10	MF	(Japan)	14	Keiji Yoshimura	1	0	0	1
10	DF	(Japan)	5	Atsushi Yoneyama	1	0	0	1
10	MF	(Japan)	10	Toshiya Fujita	0	1	0	1
10	DF	(Japan)	6	Shohei Abe	0	1	0	1
				TOTALS	48	17	4	69
