= 2012 Nagoya Grampus season =

Nagoya Grampus
2012 season
- Chairman: Toyo Kato
- Manager: Dragan Stojković
- J.League: 7th
- J.League Cup: Quarter-finals vs Shimizu S-Pulse
- AFC Champions League: Last 16 vs (Australia) Adelaide United
- Top goalscorer: League: Tulio (10); All: Tulio (16)
- Highest home attendance: 24,397 vs Vegalta Sendai; 14 July 2012
- Lowest home attendance: 5,037 vs (Australia) Central Coast Mariners; 15 May 2012
- Average home league attendance: 13,872; 9 August 2012
Home colours	Away colours

The 2012 Nagoya Grampus season was Nagoya Grampus's 20th season in the J.League Division 1 and 29th overall in the Japanese top flight. They are also competed in the 2012 J.League Cup, 2012 Emperor's Cup, and the 2012 AFC Champions League.

== Players ==
=== Current squad ===
As of March 6, 2012 Note: Flags indicate national team as defined under FIFA eligibility rules; some limited exceptions apply. Players may hold more than one non-FIFA nationality.

No.	Pos.	Nation	Player
1	GK	JPN	Seigo Narazaki
4	DF	JPN	Tulio
5	DF	JPN	Takahiro Masukawa
6	DF	JPN	Shohei Abe
7	MF	JPN	Naoshi Nakamura
8	MF	JPN	Jungo Fujimoto
10	MF	JPN	Yoshizumi Ogawa
11	FW	JPN	Keiji Tamada
14	MF	JPN	Keiji Yoshimura
16	FW	AUS	Joshua Kennedy
17	FW	JPN	Yuki Maki
18	FW	JPN	Kensuke Nagai
20	MF	COL	Danilson Córdoba
21	GK	JPN	Koji Nishimura
22	DF	BRA	Daniel

No.	Pos.	Nation	Player
23	DF	JPN	Yōsuke Ishibitsu
25	MF	JPN	Mu Kanazaki
26	DF	JPN	Tatsuya Arai
27	MF	JPN	Ryouta Tanabe
28	MF	JPN	Taishi Taguchi
29	DF	JPN	Kazuki Sato
30	MF	JPN	Taisuke Mizuno
31	FW	JPN	Miki Takahara
32	DF	JPN	Hayuma Tanaka
33	MF	JPN	Ryota Isomura
34	MF	JPN	Makito Yoshida
35	MF	JPN	Teruki Tanaka
38	MF	JPN	Alessandro Santos
50	GK	JPN	Yoshinari Takagi

=== Out on loan ===
Note: Flags indicate national team as defined under FIFA eligibility rules; some limited exceptions apply. Players may hold more than one non-FIFA nationality.

No.	Pos.	Nation	Player
31	GK	JPN	Toru Hasegawa (at Tokushima Vortis)

== Transfers ==
=== Winter ===
In: Note: Flags indicate national team as defined under FIFA eligibility rules; some limited exceptions apply. Players may hold more than one non-FIFA nationality.

No.	Pos.	Nation	Player
17	FW	JPN	Yuki Maki (loan return from Shonan Bellmare)
20	MF	COL	Danilson Córdoba (Transferred from Consadole Sapporo)
22	DF	BRA	Daniel (from Ventforet Kofu)
23	DF	JPN	Yōsuke Ishibitsu (Transferred from Vissel Kobe)
27	MF	JPN	Ryouta Tanabe (Drafted from Mitsubishi Yowa Youth)
29	DF	JPN	Kazuki Sato (Promoted from youth team)
30	MF	JPN	Taisuke Mizuno (Promoted from youth team)
31	FW	JPN	Miki Takahara (Promoted from youth team)
—	MF	JPN	Yoshiki Hiraki (loan return from Shonan Bellmare)

Out: Note: Flags indicate national team as defined under FIFA eligibility rules; some limited exceptions apply. Players may hold more than one non-FIFA nationality.

No.	Pos.	Nation	Player
3	DF	JPN	Mitsuru Chiyotanda (Transferred to Júbilo Iwata)
9	MF	MNE	Igor Burzanović (Transferred to Sagan Tosu)
22	MF	JPN	Koji Hashimoto (Transferred to Mito HollyHock)
23	DF	JPN	Genta Matsuo (Transferred to Kyoto Sanga)
27	MF	JPN	Sho Hanai (Transferred to Tokushima Vortis)
29	FW	JPN	Hikaru Kuba (Transferred to Ehime FC)
31	GK	JPN	Toru Hasegawa (Transferred to Tokushima Vortis)
—	DF	JPN	Akira Takeuchi (Transferred to JEF United Chiba)
—	MF	JPN	Yoshiki Hiraki (Transferred to Blaublitz Akita)
—	FW	JPN	Tomohiro Tsuda (Transferred to Tokushima Vortis)

=== Summer ===
In: Note: Flags indicate national team as defined under FIFA eligibility rules; some limited exceptions apply. Players may hold more than one non-FIFA nationality.

No.	Pos.	Nation	Player

Out: Note: Flags indicate national team as defined under FIFA eligibility rules; some limited exceptions apply. Players may hold more than one non-FIFA nationality.

No.	Pos.	Nation	Player
26	DF	JPN	Tatsuya Arai (loan to FC Gifu)

== Competitions ==
=== J.League ===
==== Results summary ====
Overall								Home						Away					
Pld	W	D	L	GF	GA	GD	Pts	W	D	L	GF	GA	GD	W	D	L	GF	GA	GD
34	15	7	12	46	47	−1	52	8	3	6	22	19	+3	7	4	6	24	28	−4

Last updated: 3 December 2012.
Source: World-Football.net

==== Results by round ====
Round	1	2	3	4	5	6	7	8	9	10	11	12	13	14	15	16	17	18	19	20	21	22	23	24	25	26	27	28	29	30	31	32	33	34
Ground	H	A	H	A	H	H	A	H	H	A	A	H	A	H	A	A	A	H	A	H	A	H	A	H	A	H	A	H	A	H	H	A	H	A
Result	W	L	W	D	W	W	D	L	L	W	L	L	W	W	D	D	W	D	L	W	L	L	W	W	W	L	L	D	W	D	W	W	L	L
Position	3	7	7	6	6	3	2	6	10	8	10	10	9	7	8	7	4	5	8	5	7	9	8	6	5	6	7	7	6	5	4	4	6	7

Updated to match(es) played on 3 December 2012. Source: "World-Football.net". Archived from the original on 2013-05-27.
A = Away; H = Home; W = Win; D = Draw; L = Loss

==== Results ====
10 March 2012 Round 1	Nagoya Grampus	1–0	Shimizu S-Pulse	Toyota Stadium
14:00 JST (UTC+9)	Kennedy 33' (pen.)	Summary		Attendance: 24,316; Referee: Yuichi Nishimura

17 March 2012 Round 2	FC Tokyo	3–2	Nagoya Grampus	Ajinomoto Stadium
19:00 JST (UTC+9)	Ishikawa 59', 73'; Hasegawa 67'	Report	Tamada 36'; Nagai 87'; Córdoba (yellow card) 84' (yellow-red card) 90+3'	Attendance: 21,757; Referee: Nobutsugu Murakami

25 March 2012 Round 3	Nagoya Grampus	2–1	Albirex Niigata	Mizuho Athletic Stadium
17:00 JST (UTC+9)	Kanazaki 49'; Kennedy 67'	Report	Bruno Lopes 90+4'	Attendance: 10,603; Referee: Itaru Hirose

31 March 2012 Round 4	Omiya Ardija	1–1	Nagoya Grampus	NACK5 Stadium
14:00 JST (UTC+9)	Kanakubo 55'	Report	Córdoba 48'	Attendance: 7,936; Referee: Hajime Matsuo

7 April 2012 Round 5	Nagoya Grampus	1–0	Sagan Tosu	Toyota Stadium
15:00 JST (UTC+9)	Nagai 27'	Summary		Attendance: 13,824; Referee: Tomohiro Inoue

14 April 2012 Round 6	Nagoya Grampus	3–1	Consadole Sapporo	Toyota Stadium
17:00 JST (UTC+9)	Kanazaki 3'; Fujimoto 15'; Tamada 77'	Summary	Furuta 89'	Attendance: 12,896; Referee: Futoshi Nakamura

21 April 2012 Round 7	Sanfrecce Hiroshima	1–1	Nagoya Grampus	Hiroshima Big Arch
15:00 JST (UTC+9)	Moriwaki 90+4'	Report	Tulio 62'	Attendance: 11,123; Referee: Takuya Maeda

28 April 2012 Round 8	Nagoya Grampus	1–2	Urawa Red Diamonds	Mizuho Athletic Stadium
14:00 JST (UTC+9)	Kanazaki 27'; Tanaka (yellow card) 48' (yellow-red card) 67'	Report	Márcio Richardes 23', 69' (pen.)	Attendance: 18,138; Referee: Kenji Ogiya

6 May 2012 Round 9	Nagoya Grampus	2–3	Kawasaki Frontale	Toyota Stadium
18:00 JST (UTC+9)	Kennedy 9'; Fujimoto 71'	Summary	Tasaka 1'; Yajima 14', 45+3'	Attendance: 20,512; Referee: Toshimitsu Yoshida

12 May 2012 Round 10	Vissel Kobe	0–1	Nagoya Grampus	Home's Stadium Kobe
19:30 JST (UTC+9)		Summary	Tamada 42'	Attendance: 14,825; Referee: Yuichi Nishimura

19 May 2012 Round 11	Vegalta Sendai	4–0	Nagoya Grampus	Yurtec Stadium Sendai
19:30 JST (UTC+9)	Ryang Yong-Gi 38'; Masukawa 45' (o.g.); Wilson 87'; Sugai 90'	Summary		Attendance: 16,317; Referee: Masaaki Iemoto

25 May 2012 Round 12	Nagoya Grampus	0–1	Cerezo Osaka	Toyota Stadium
20:30 JST (UTC+9)		Summary	Kempes 49'; Bando (yellow card) 43' (yellow-red card) 60'	Attendance: 16,657; Referee: Minoru Tojo

16 June 2012 Round 13	Kashima Antlers	2–3	Nagoya Grampus	Kashima Soccer Stadium
19:30 JST (UTC+9)	Koroki 44'; Motoyama 77'	Summary	Nagai 59', 86'; Kanazaki 66'	Attendance: 15,010; Referee: Nobutsugu Murakami

23 June 2012 Round 14	Nagoya Grampus	2–0	Júbilo Iwata	Mizuho Athletic Stadium
20:00 JST (UTC+9)	Fujimoto 45+4'; Nagai 46'	Summary		Attendance: 16,862; Referee: Toshimitsu Yoshida

27 June 2012 Round 15	Gamba Osaka	2–2	Nagoya Grampus	Osaka Expo '70 Stadium
20:00 JST (UTC+9)	Nakazawa 25'; Futagawa 73'	Summary	Nagai 8', 18'	Attendance: 10,840; Referee: Yuichi Nishimura

30 June 2012 Round 16	Yokohama F. Marinos	1–1	Nagoya Grampus	Nissan Stadium
19:00 JST (UTC+9)	Marquinhos 53'	Report	Nagai 83'	Attendance: 26,133; Referee: Kazuhiko Matsumura

7 July 2012 Round 17	Kashiwa Reysol	1–2	Nagoya Grampus	Hitachi Kashiwa Soccer Stadium
20:00 JST (UTC+9)	Leandro Domingues 17'	Report	Kennedy 9'; Otani 63' (o.g.)	Attendance: 25,459; Referee: Masaaki Iemoto

14 July 2012 Round 18	Nagoya Grampus	0–0	Vegalta Sendai	Toyota Stadium
20:00 JST (UTC+9)		Report		Attendance: 24,397; Referee: Jumpei Iida

28 July 2012 Round 19	Consadole Sapporo	2–1	Nagoya Grampus	Sapporo Dome
17:00 JST (UTC+9)	Yamamoto 55'; Uehara 90+2'	Report	Tulio 58'	Attendance: 8,360; Referee: Kenji Ogiya

4 August 2012 Round 20	Nagoya Grampus	5–1	Vissel Kobe	Mizuho Athletic Stadium
20:00 JST (UTC+9)	Tulio 2', 39', 50', 88'; Ogawa 26'	Report	Ogawa 90'	Attendance: 10,034; Referee: Toshimitsu Yoshida

11 August 2012 Round 21	Shimizu S-Pulse	3–2	Nagoya Grampus	Outsourcing Stadium
19:00 JST (UTC+9)	Abe 4' (o.g.); Takagi 45+1'; Omae 73'	Report	Taguchi 11'; Córdoba 86'	Attendance: 16,877; Referee: Hajime Matsuo

18 August 2012 Round 22	Nagoya Grampus	0–5	Gamba Osaka	Toyota Stadium
19:00 JST (UTC+9)		Report	Leandro 38'; Endō 43' (pen.); Konno 68'; Sato 70'; Paulinho 83'	Attendance: 30,354; Referee: Masaaki Iemoto

25 August 2012 Round 23	Kawasaki Frontale	0–1	Nagoya Grampus	Todoroki Athletics Stadium
19:00 JST (UTC+9)		Report	Kanazaki 74'	Attendance: 18,915; Referee: Nobutsugu Murakami

1 September 2012 Round 24	Nagoya Grampus	1–0	Kashiwa Reysol	Toyota Stadium
19:00 JST (UTC+9)	Tamada 79'	Report		Attendance: 14,193; Referee: Kazuhiko Matsumura

15 September 2012 Round 25	Cerezo Osaka	0–2	Nagoya Grampus	Kincho Stadium
19:00 JST (UTC+9)		Report	Taguchi 38'; Kennedy 68'	Attendance: 24,544; Referee: Toshimitsu Yoshida

21 September 2012 Round 26	Nagoya Grampus	1–2	Sanfrecce Hiroshima	Toyota Stadium
19:00 JST (UTC+9)	Tulio 50'	Report	Shimizu 40'; Moriwaki 90+3'	Attendance: 15,870; Referee: Hiroyoshi Takayama

29 September 2012 Round 27	Albirex Niigata	5–0	Nagoya Grampus	Niigata Stadium
14:00 JST (UTC+9)	Michael 56', 64'; Murakami 73'; Bruno Lopes 90'; Tsubouchi 90+5'	Report		Attendance: 22,079; Referee: Tomoya Maeda

6 October 2012 Round 28	Nagoya Grampus	0–0	Omiya Ardija	Toyota Stadium
15:00 JST (UTC+9)		Report		Attendance: 8,793; Referee: Kenji Ogiya

20 October 2012 Round 29	Sagan Tosu	1–3	Nagoya Grampus	Tosu Stadium
15:00 JST (UTC+9)	Noda 90+5'	Report	Nagai 45+3'; Córdoba 67'; Tulio 90'	Attendance: 11,851; Referee: Masaaki Toma

27 October 2012 Round 30	Nagoya Grampus	1–1	Yokohama F. Marinos	Toyota Stadium
15:00 JST (UTC+9)	Tamada 87'	Report	Nakamura 90+5'	Attendance: 22,332; Referee: Minoru Tojo

7 November 2012 Round 31	Nagoya Grampus	1–0	FC Tokyo	Toyota Stadium
19:00 JST (UTC+9)	Tulio 30'	Report

17 November 2012 Round 32	Júbilo Iwata	0–2	Nagoya Grampus
14:00 JST (UTC+9)		Report	Tulio 45+1'; Nagai 90+3'	Attendance: 8,978; Referee: Yuichi Nishimura

23 November 2012 Round 33	Nagoya Grampus	1–2	Kashima Antlers	Toyota Stadium
14:30 JST (UTC+9)	Masukawa 25'	Report	Dutra Junior 7', 35'	Attendance: 23,892; Referee: Itaru Hirose

1 December 2012 Round 34	Urawa Red Diamonds	2–0	Nagoya Grampus	Saitama Stadium 2002
15:30 JST (UTC+9)	Kashiwagi 23'; Makino 59'	Report		Attendance: 51,879; Referee: Nobutsugu Murakami

==== League table ====
Pos	Team	Pld	W	D	L	GF	GA	GD	Pts	Qualification or relegation
1	Sanfrecce Hiroshima (C)	34	19	7	8	63	34	+29	64	Qualification to 2012 Club World Cup and 2013 Champions League
2	Vegalta Sendai	34	15	12	7	59	43	+16	57	Qualification to 2013 Champions League (Note: The winners of the 2012 Emperor's Cup qualified for the group stage of the 2013 AFC Champions League.)
3	Urawa Red Diamonds	34	15	10	9	47	42	+5	55	Qualification to 2013 Champions League
4	Yokohama F. Marinos	34	13	14	7	44	33	+11	53	
5	Sagan Tosu	34	15	8	11	48	39	+9	53	
6	Kashiwa Reysol	34	15	7	12	57	52	+5	52	Qualification to 2013 Champions League
7	Nagoya Grampus	34	15	7	12	46	47	−1	52	
8	Kawasaki Frontale	34	14	8	12	51	50	+1	50	
9	Shimizu S-Pulse	34	14	7	13	39	40	−1	49	
10	FC Tokyo	34	14	6	14	47	44	+3	48	
11	Kashima Antlers	34	12	10	12	50	43	+7	46	
12	Júbilo Iwata	34	13	7	14	57	53	+4	46	
13	Omiya Ardija	34	11	11	12	38	45	−7	44	
14	Cerezo Osaka	34	11	9	14	47	53	−6	42	
15	Albirex Niigata	34	10	10	14	29	34	−5	40	
16	Vissel Kobe (R)	34	11	6	17	41	50	−9	39	Relegation to 2013 J.League Division 2
17	Gamba Osaka (R)	34	9	11	14	67	65	+2	38	Relegation to 2013 J.League Division 2
18	Consadole Sapporo (R)	34	4	2	28	25	88	−63	14	Relegation to 2013 J.League Division 2

Updated to match(es) played on 1 December 2012. Source: J.League Division 1
Rules for classification: 1) points; 2) goal difference; 3) number of goals scored.
(C) Champions; (R) Relegated

=== J.League Cup ===
25 July 2012 Quarter-finals; 1st Leg	Shimizu S-Pulse	0–1	Nagoya Grampus	Outsourcing Stadium
20:00 JST (UTC+9)		report	Yoshida 77'	Attendance: 6,719; Referee: Minoru Tojo

8 August 2012 Quarter-finals; 2nd Leg	Nagoya Grampus	3–4 ((a)4 – 4 agg.)	Shimizu S-Pulse	Mizuho Athletic Stadium
20:00 JST (UTC+9)	Tulio 54'; Fujimoto 76', 87'	report	Brosque 42'; França 69'; Shiotani 88'; Takagi 90+3'	Attendance: 7,313; Referee: Ryuji Sato

=== Emperor's Cup ===
8 September 2012 Second Round	Nagoya Grampus	2–0	Kariya	Technoport Fukui Stadium, Sakai
15:00 JST (UTC+9)	Masukawa 58'; Ogawa 66'	report

10 October 2012 Third Round	Fagiano Okayama	2–3	Nagoya Grampus	Momotaro Stadium, Okayama
19:00 JST (UTC+9)	Sengoku 39'; Sekido 75'	Report	Tulio 46', 90+1' (pen.); Nagai 62'	Attendance: 2,102; Referee: Yoshiro Imamura

15 December 2012 Fourth Round	Nagoya Grampus	5–2	Roasso Kumamoto	Mizuho Athletic Stadium, Nagoya
15:00 JST (UTC+9)	Tulio 15'; Kanazaki 43'; Ogawa 65'; Nagai 79'; Tamada 85'	[ Report]	Saito 23', 45'	Referee: Yoshiro Imamura

23 December 2012 Fourth Round	Yokohama F. Marinos	–	Nagoya Grampus	Mizuho Athletic Stadium, Nagoya
13:00 JST (UTC+9)		[ Report]

=== AFC Champions League ===
==== Group stage ====
Pos	Team	Pld	W	D	L	GF	GA	GD	Pts	Qualification	SIC	NGY	CCM	TTD
1	(South Korea) Seongnam Ilhwa Chunma	6	2	4	0	13	5	+8	10 (Note: Seongnam Ilhwa Chunma and Nagoya Grampus are tied on their head-to-head record (2 pts, 0 GD, 3 GF), and so are ranked by their overall goal difference.)	Advance to knockout stage	—	1–1	5–0	1–1
2	(Japan) Nagoya Grampus	6	2	4	0	10	4	+6	10	Advance to knockout stage	2–2	—	3–0	0–0
3	(Australia) Central Coast Mariners	6	1	3	2	7	11	−4	6		1–1	1–1	—	5–1
4	(China) Tianjin Teda	6	0	3	3	2	12	−10	3		0–3	0–3	0–0	—

Source: WorldFootball.net
Notes:

7 March 2012 Group Stage	Nagoya Grampus (Japan)	2–2	(South Korea) Seongnam Ilhwa Chunma	Nagoya, Japan
19:00 JST (UTC+9)	Kennedy 57' (pen.); Kanazaki 73'	Report; Summary	Héverton 47', 90+4'	Stadium: Mizuho Athletic Stadium; Attendance: 6,686; Referee: Nawaf Shukralla (Bahrain)

21 March 2012 Group Stage	Central Coast Mariners (Australia)	1–1	(Japan) Nagoya Grampus	Gosford, Australia
17:30 JST (UTC+9)	Zwaanswijk 28'	Summary	Tulio 21'	Stadium: Central Coast Stadium; Attendance: 5,130; Referee: Liu Kwok Man (Hong Kong)

3 April 2012 Group Stage	Tianjin Teda (China)	0–3	(Japan) Nagoya Grampus	Tianjin, China
20:30 JST (UTC+9)		Report; Summary	Fujimoto 24'; Tamada 49'; Maki 73'	Stadium: TEDA Football Stadium; Attendance: 12,249; Referee: Ravshan Irmatov (Uzbekistan)

18 April 2012 Group Stage	Nagoya Grampus (Japan)	0–0	(China) Tianjin Teda	Nagoya, Japan
19:00 JST (UTC+9)		Summary		Stadium: Mizuho Athletic Stadium; Attendance: 6,006; Referee: Liu Kwok Man (Hong Kong)

1 May 2012 Group Stage	Seongnam Ilhwa Chunma (South Korea)	1–1	(Japan) Nagoya Grampus	Seongnam, South Korea
19:30 JST (UTC+9)	Han Sang-Woon 12'	Report	Park Jin-Po 72' (o.g.)	Stadium: Tancheon Sports Complex; Attendance: 6,379; Referee: Ali Al Badwawi (UAE)

15 May 2012 Group Stage	Nagoya Grampus (Japan)	3–0	(Australia) Central Coast Mariners	Nagoya, Japan
19:00 JST (UTC+9)	Tamada 19'; Fujimoto 35'; Tulio 87'	Summary		Stadium: Mizuho Athletic Stadium; Attendance: 5,037; Referee: Abdulrahman Abdou (Qatar)

==== Knockout stage ====
29 May 2012 Last 16	Adelaide United (Australia)	1–0	(Japan) Nagoya Grampus	Adelaide, Australia
19:00 JST (UTC+9)	McKain 41'	Summary; Report		Stadium: Hindmarsh Stadium; Attendance: 9,758; Referee: Malik Abdul Bashir (Singapore)

== Squad statistics ==
=== Appearances and goals ===
As of 15 December 2012

No.	Pos	Nat	Player	Total		J-League		J-League Cup		Emperor's Cup		AFC Champions League	
No.	Pos	Nat	Player	Apps	Goals	Apps	Goals	Apps	Goals	Apps	Goals	Apps	Goals
1	GK	(Japan) JPN	Seigo Narazaki	42	0	31+0	0	1+0	0	3+0	0	7+0	0
4	DF	(Japan) JPN	Tulio	41	16	32+0	10	2+0	1	2+0	3	5+0	2
5	DF	(Japan) JPN	Takahiro Masukawa	42	2	23+9	1	2+0	0	3+0	1	5+0	0
6	DF	(Japan) JPN	Shohei Abe	38	0	27+1	0	2+0	0	2+0	0	5+1	0
7	MF	(Japan) JPN	Naoshi Nakamura	8	0	2+3	0	0+0	0	0+0	0	3+0	0
8	MF	(Japan) JPN	Jungo Fujimoto	42	7	30+2	3	2+0	2	3+0	0	5+0	2
10	MF	(Japan) JPN	Yoshizumi Ogawa	40	3	24+6	1	2+0	0	3+0	2	4+1	0
11	FW	(Japan) JPN	Keiji Tamada	33	7	19+5	4	0+0	0	1+1	1	6+1	2
14	MF	(Japan) JPN	Keiji Yoshimura	18	0	3+8	0	0+2	0	1+0	0	2+2	0
16	FW	(Australia) AUS	Joshua Kennedy	22	6	17+0	5	0+0	0	1+0	0	4+0	1
17	FW	(Japan) JPN	Yuki Maki	15	0	0+11	0	0+1	0	0+0	0	0+3	0
18	FW	(Japan) JPN	Kensuke Nagai	38	12	23+6	10	0+0	0	2+0	2	5+2	0
20	MF	(Colombia) COL	Danilson Córdoba	35	3	23+3	3	2+0	0	1+1	0	5+0	0
22	DF	(Brazil) BRA	Daniel	40	0	22+7	0	2+0	0	3+0	0	5+1	0
23	DF	(Japan) JPN	Yōsuke Ishibitsu	16	0	5+5	0	2+0	0	1+0	0	3+0	0
25	MF	(Japan) JPN	Mu Kanazaki	42	7	26+5	5	1+0	0	1+2	1	6+1	1
27	MF	(Japan) JPN	Ryouta Tanabe	6	0	0+3	0	0+0	0	0+2	0	0+1	0
28	MF	(Japan) JPN	Taishi Taguchi	32	2	20+4	2	2+0	0	3+0	0	1+2	0
29	DF	(Japan) JPN	Kazuki Sato	1	0	0+0	0	0+0	0	1+0	0	0+0	0
32	DF	(Japan) JPN	Hayuma Tanaka	39	0	30+0	0	0+1	0	2+0	0	5+1	0
33	MF	(Japan) JPN	Ryota Isomura	6	0	0+5	0	0+0	0	0+0	0	0+1	0
34	MF	(Japan) JPN	Makito Yoshida	4	1	1+1	0	0+1	1	0+0	0	0+1	0
35	MF	(Japan) JPN	Teruki Tanaka	13	0	0+8	0	1+1	0	0+0	0	1+2	0
38	MF	(Japan) JPN	Alessandro Santos	8	0	3+2	0	0+0	0	0+2	0	0+1	0
50	GK	(Japan) JPN	Yoshinari Takagi	3	0	2+0	0	1+0	0	0+0	0	0+0	0
Players who appeared for Nagoya Grampus no longer at the club:

=== Goal Scorers ===
Place	Position	Nation	Number	Name	J-League	J-League Cup	Emperor's Cup	AFC Champions League	Total
1	DF	(Japan)	4	Tulio	10	1	3	2	16
2	FW	(Japan)	18	Kensuke Nagai	10	0	2	0	12
3	FW	(Japan)	11	Keiji Tamada	5	0	1	2	8
4	MF	(Japan)	8	Jungo Fujimoto	3	2	0	2	7
4	MF	(Japan)	25	Mu Kanazaki	5	0	1	1	7
6	FW	(Australia)	16	Joshua Kennedy	5	0	0	1	6
7	MF	(Colombia)	20	Danilson Córdoba	3	0	0	0	3
7	MF	(Japan)	10	Yoshizumi Ogawa	1	0	2	0	3
9	MF	(Japan)	28	Taishi Taguchi	2	0	0	0	2
9	DF	(Japan)	5	Takahiro Masukawa	1	0	1	0	2
9				Own goal	1	0	0	1	2
12	MF	(Japan)	34	Makito Yoshida	0	1	0	0	1
12	FW	(Japan)	17	Yuki Maki	0	0	0	1	1
				TOTALS	46	4	10	10	69

=== Disciplinary record ===
Number	Nation	Position	Name	J-League		J.League Cup		Emperor's Cup		AFC Champions League		Total	
Number	Nation	Position	Name	Yellow card	Red card	Yellow card	Red card	Yellow card	Red card	Yellow card	Red card	Yellow card	Red card
1	(Japan)	GK	Seigo Narazaki	2	0	0	0	0	0	0	0	2	0
4	(Japan)	DF	Tulio	6	0	1	0	1	0	0	0	8	0
5	(Japan)	DF	Takahiro Masukawa	1	1	1	0	0	0	0	0	2	1
6	(Japan)	DF	Shohei Abe	2	0	0	0	1	0	1	0	4	0
8	(Japan)	MF	Jungo Fujimoto	3	0	1	0	1	0	3	0	8	0
10	(Japan)	MF	Yoshizumi Ogawa	6	0	1	0	1	0	1	0	9	0
14	(Japan)	MF	Keiji Yoshimura	3	0	0	0	0	0	1	0	4	0
16	(Australia)	FW	Joshua Kennedy	2	0	0	0	0	0	1	0	3	0
17	(Japan)	FW	Yuki Maki	0	0	0	0	0	0	2	0	2	0
18	(Japan)	FW	Kensuke Nagai	4	0	0	0	0	0	0	0	4	0
20	(Colombia)	MF	Danilson Córdoba	6	1	0	0	0	0	0	0	6	1
22	(Brazil)	DF	Daniel	6	0	0	0	0	0	1	0	7	0
23	(Japan)	DF	Yōsuke Ishibitsu	1	0	2	0	1	0	0	0	4	0
25	(Japan)	MF	Mu Kanazaki	0	0	0	0	1	0	0	0	1	0
28	(Japan)	MF	Taishi Taguchi	6	0	0	0	0	0	0	0	6	0
32	(Japan)	DF	Hayuma Tanaka	8	1	0	0	0	0	1	0	9	1
33	(Japan)	MF	Ryota Isomura	1	0	0	0	0	0	0	0	1	0
35	(Japan)	MF	Teruki Tanaka	1	0	0	0	0	0	0	0	1	0
38	(Japan)	MF	Alessandro Santos	1	0	0	0	0	0	0	0	1	0
			TOTALS	58	3	6	0	6	0	11	0	81	3
