= 2010 Nagoya Grampus season =

Nagoya Grampus
2010 season
- Chairman: Toyo Kato
- Manager: Dragan Stojković
- J.League Division 1: 1st
- Emperor's Cup: Quarterfinals vs Kashima Antlers
- J.League Cup: Group Stage
- Top goalscorer: League: Joshua Kennedy (17); All: Joshua Kennedy (18)
Home colours	Away colours

The 2010 Nagoya Grampus season was Nagoya Grampus's 18th season in the J.League Division 1 and 29th overall in the Japanese top flight. They also competed in the 2010 J.League Cup, 2010 Emperor's Cup.

== Players ==
=== Current squad ===
Note: Flags indicate national team as defined under FIFA eligibility rules; some limited exceptions apply. Players may hold more than one non-FIFA nationality.

No.	Pos.	Nation	Player
1	GK	JPN	Seigo Narazaki
2	DF	JPN	Akira Takeuchi
3	DF	JPN	Mitsuru Chiyotanda
4	DF	JPN	Tulio
5	DF	JPN	Takahiro Masukawa
6	DF	JPN	Shohei Abe
7	MF	JPN	Naoshi Nakamura
8	MF	BRA	Magnum
9	MF	MNE	Igor Burzanović
10	MF	JPN	Yoshizumi Ogawa
11	FW	JPN	Keiji Tamada
14	MF	JPN	Keiji Yoshimura
16	FW	AUS	Joshua Kennedy
17	FW	JPN	Yuki Maki
19	FW	JPN	Keita Sugimoto

No.	Pos.	Nation	Player
20	MF	COL	Danilson Córdoba
21	GK	JPN	Koji Nishimura
22	MF	JPN	Koji Hashimoto
23	DF	JPN	Genta Matsuo
24	MF	JPN	Shinta Fukushima
25	MF	JPN	Mu Kanazaki
26	DF	JPN	Tatsuya Arai
27	MF	JPN	Sho Hanai
28	MF	JPN	Taishi Taguchi
29	FW	JPN	Hikaru Kuba
31	GK	JPN	Toru Hasegawa
32	DF	JPN	Hayuma Tanaka
33	MF	JPN	Ryota Isomura
38	MF	JPN	Alessandro Santos
50	GK	JPN	Yoshinari Takagi

=== Transfers ===
In: Note: Flags indicate national team as defined under FIFA eligibility rules; some limited exceptions apply. Players may hold more than one non-FIFA nationality.

No.	Pos.	Nation	Player
20	DF	COL	Danilson Córdoba (on from (Japan) Consadole Sapporo)

Out: Note: Flags indicate national team as defined under FIFA eligibility rules; some limited exceptions apply. Players may hold more than one non-FIFA nationality.

No.	Pos.	Nation	Player
3	DF	SRB	Miloš Bajalica (to (China) Henan Construction)

== Competitions ==
=== J.League ===
==== Results summary ====
Overall								Home						Away					
Pld	W	D	L	GF	GA	GD	Pts	W	D	L	GF	GA	GD	W	D	L	GF	GA	GD
34	23	3	8	54	37	+17	72	11	3	3	30	20	+10	12	0	5	24	17	+7

Last updated: 9 December 2011.

==== Results by round ====
Round	1	2	3	4	5	6	7	8	9	10	11	12	13	14	15	16	17	18	19	20	21	22	23	24	25	26	27	28	29	30	31	32	33	34
Ground	A	H	H	H	A	H	A	A	H	A	A	H	A	H	H	A	A	H	A	H	H	A	H	A	H	A	A	H	A	H	A	H	A	H
Result	W	L	W	W	W	D	L	W	W	L	W	L	W	D	W	W	W	W	L	W	W	W	D	W	W	L	W	W	L	W	W	L	W	W
Position																																1	1	1

Source: "World-Football.net". Archived from the original on 27 May 2013.
A = Away; H = Home; W = Win; D = Draw; L = Loss

==== Results ====
6 March 2010 Round 1	Gamba Osaka	1–2	Nagoya Grampus	Osaka Expo '70 Stadium
	Futagawa 22'	Summary	Tamada 15'; Kennedy 69'	Attendance: 18,105; Referee: Masayoshi Okada

13 March 2010 Round 2	Nagoya Grampus	2–3	Kawasaki Frontale	Mizuho Athletic Stadium
	Kanazaki 6'; Magnum 78'	Summary	Renatinho; Jong Tae-Se 16', 90'	Attendance: 25,176; Referee: Ryuji Sato

21 March 2010 Round 3	Nagoya Grampus	2–0	Júbilo Iwata	Mizuho Athletic Stadium
	Burzanović 1'; Kennedy 89'	Summary		Attendance: 12,749; Referee: Tomohiro Inoue

3 April 2010 Round 4	Nagoya Grampus	2–0	Vissel Kobe	Mizuho Athletic Stadium
	Burzanović 26', 72'	Summary	Popó (yellow card) 25' (yellow-red card) 90+4'	Attendance: 17,776; Referee: Masayoshi Okada

10 April 2010 Round 5	Kyoto Sanga	0–2	Nagoya Grampus	Nishikyogoku Athletic Stadium
		Summary	Tulio 8'; Kennedy 55'	Attendance: 10,094; Referee: Akio Okutani

17 April 2010 Round 6	Nagoya Grampus	1–1	Albirex Niigata	Mizuho Athletic Stadium
	Tulio 83'	Summary	Ōshima 89'	Attendance: 10,083

21 April 2010 Round 7	Sanfrecce Hiroshima	1–0	Nagoya Grampus	Hiroshima Big Arch
	Satō 88'	Summary		Attendance: 9,502

25 April 2010 Round 8	Cerezo Osaka	0–1	Nagoya Grampus	Nagai Ball Gall Field
		Summary	Tamada 90'	Attendance: 13,867

1 May 2010 Round 9	Nagoya Grampus	2–1	Montedio Yamagata	Mizuho Athletic Stadium
	Kennedy 7'; Tulio 90'	Summary	Kitamura 41'	Attendance: 13,206

5 May 2010 Round 10	Urawa Red Diamonds	2–1	Nagoya Grampus	Saitama Stadium 2002
	Kashiwagi 47'; Haraguchi 55'	Summary	Kennedy 12'	Attendance: 55,410

9 May 2010 Round 11	Vegalta Sendai	1–2	Nagoya Grampus	Yurtec Stadium Sendai
	Fernandinho 84'	Summary	Kennedy 39' (pen.), 89'	Attendance: 17,239

16 May 2010 Round 12	Nagoya Grampus	1–4	Kashima Antlers	Mizuho Athletic Stadium
	Kennedy 46'	Summary	Nozawa 45'; Koroki 53'; Marquinhos 69'; Motoyama 90'	Attendance: 34,098

17 July 2010 Round 13	Omiya Ardija	0–1	Nagoya Grampus	NACK5 Stadium Omiya
		Summary	Burzanović (yellow card) 12' (yellow-red card) 42'; Kennedy 76'	Attendance: 13,624

24 July 2010 Round 14	Nagoya Grampus	3–3	Shimizu S-Pulse	Mizuho Athletic Stadium
	Tamada 9', 45'; Kanazaki 76'	Summary	Johnsen 20'; Okazaki 69'; Bosnar 79'	Attendance: 17,534

28 July 2010 Round 15	Nagoya Grampus	2–1	Shonan Bellmare	Mizuho Athletic Stadium
	Tulio 17'; Córdoba 68'	Summary	Tahara 79'	Attendance: 7,991

31 July 2010 Round 16	Yokohama F. Marinos	0–2	Nagoya Grampus	Nissan Stadium
		Summary	Kennedy 37'; Córdoba 68'; Takagi (red card) 90'	Attendance: 29,964

8 August 2010 Round 17	F.C. Tokyo	0–1	Nagoya Grampus	Ajinomoto Stadium
		Summary	Tulio 90'	Attendance: 27,990

14 August 2010 Round 18	Nagoya Grampus	3–1	Urawa Red Diamonds	Mizuho Athletic Stadium
	Tulio 54'; Tamada 79', 83'	Summary	Ugajin 65'	Attendance: 31,715

18 August 2010 Round 19	Kawasaki Frontale	4–0	Nagoya Grampus	Todoroki Athletics Stadium
	Vitor Júnior 36', 64'; Juninho 80'; Tasaka 86'	Summary	Masukawa (yellow card) 17' (yellow-red card) 71'	Attendance: 22,047

22 August 2010 Round 20	Nagoya Grampus	3–1	Gamba Osaka	Mizuho Athletic Stadium
	Nakamura 7'; Córdoba 32'; Kennedy 70'	Summary	Hashimoto 18'	Attendance: 17,311

28 August 2010 Round 21	Nagoya Grampus	1–0	Kyoto Sanga	Mizuho Athletic Stadium
	Kanazaki 21'	Summary		Attendance: 13,944

12 September 2010 Round 22	Montedio Yamagata	0–1	Nagoya Grampus	ND Soft Stadium
		Summary	Tamada 27'	Attendance: 10,119

{{football box collapsible |round = Round 23 |date = 18 September 2010 |time = |team1 = Nagoya Grampus |score = 1–1 |report = Summary |team2 = Yokohama F. Marinos |goals1 = Kanazaki 48' |goals2 = [[Takashi Amano {footballer}|Amano]] 23' |stadium = Mizuho Athletic Stadium |attendance = 17,882 |referee = |result = D }}

25 September 2010 Round 24	Shimizu S-Pulse	1–5	Nagoya Grampus	Outsourcing Stadium Nihondaira
	Edamura 47'; Iwashita (red card) 69'	Summary	Tamada 50', 62', 71'; Kennedy 58', 83'	Attendance: 19,496

2 October 2010 Round 25	Nagoya Grampus	2–1	Vegalta Sendai	Mizuho Athletic Stadium
	Kennedy 57' (pen.); Ogawa 88'	Summary	Ryang Yong-Gi 22'	Attendance: 13,027

17 October 2010 Round 26	Albirex Niigata	4–1	Nagoya Grampus	Tohoku Denryoku Big Swan Stadium
	Marcio Richardes 31', 74'; Mikado 43'; Oshima 45'	Summary	Kennedy 34'; Nakamura (yellow card) 29' (yellow-red card) 53'	Attendance: 32,754

23 October 2010 Round 27	Vissel Kobe	1–2	Nagoya Grampus	Home's Stadium Kobe
	Popó 70'	Summary	Tamada 5'; Córdoba 30'	Attendance: 15,276

30 October 2010 Round 28	Nagoya Grampus	1–0	Cerezo Osaka	Mizuho Athletic Stadium
	Kennedy 28' (pen.)	Summary		Attendance: 24,061

7 November 2010 Round 29	Kashima Antlers	1–0	Nagoya Grampus	Kashima Soccer Stadium
	Marquinhos 57'	Summary		Attendance: 27,969

14 November 2010 Round 30	Nagoya Grampus	2–1	Omiya Ardija	Mizuho Athletic Stadium
	Burzanović 6'; Masukawa 42'	Summary	Ishihara 32'	Attendance: 17,486

20 November 2010 Round 31	Shonan Bellmare	0–1	Nagoya Grampus	Hiratsuka Athletics Stadium
		Summary	Tamada 66'	Attendance: 12,650; Referee: Tomohiro Inoue

23 November 2010 Round 32	Nagoya Grampus	0–1	Tokyo	Mizuho Athletic Stadium
		Summary	Yazawa 27'	Attendance: 33,655

27 November 2010 Round 33	Júbilo Iwata	1–2	Nagoya Grampus	Yamaha Stadium
	Maeda 81'	Summary	Ogawa 11'; Tamada 16'	Attendance: 13,278

4 December 2010 Round 34	Nagoya Grampus	2–1	Sanfrecce Hiroshima	Mizuho Athletic Stadium
	Kennedy 22'; Magnum 33'	Summary	Lee 45'	Attendance: 31,941; Referee: Itaru Hirose

==== League table ====
Pos	Team	Pld	W	D	L	GF	GA	GD	Pts	Qualification or relegation
1	Nagoya Grampus (C)	34	23	3	8	54	37	+17	72	Qualification for 2011 AFC Champions League group stage (Note: Kashima Antlers qualified as 2010 Emperor's Cup winners.)
2	Gamba Osaka	34	18	8	8	65	44	+21	62	Qualification for 2011 AFC Champions League group stage
3	Cerezo Osaka	34	17	10	7	58	32	+26	61	Qualification for 2011 AFC Champions League group stage
4	Kashima Antlers	34	16	12	6	51	31	+20	60	Qualification for 2011 AFC Champions League group stage
5	Kawasaki Frontale	34	15	9	10	61	47	+14	54	

Updated to match(es) played on December 4, 2010. Source: J.League Division 1
Rules for classification: 1) points; 2) goal difference; 3) number of goals scored.
(C) Champions

=== J.League Cup ===
Team	Pld	W	D	L	GF	GA	GD	Pts
F.C. Tokyo	6	4	1	1	7	4	+3	13
Vegalta Sendai	6	3	3	0	7	1	+6	12
Kyoto Sanga	6	3	2	1	9	5	+4	11
Albirex Niigata	6	3	1	2	5	5	0	10
Omiya Ardija	6	2	1	3	6	9	−3	7
Nagoya Grampus	6	0	3	3	4	9	−5	3
Cerezo Osaka	6	0	1	5	4	9	−5	1

31 March 2010 1	F.C. Tokyo	2–2	Nagoya Grampus	Ajinomoto Stadium
	Hirayama 68'; Shigematsu 90'	Summary	Kennedy 30'; Chiyotanda 74'	Attendance: 12,291

22 May 2010 2	Nagoya Grampus	1–3	Omiya Ardija	Mizuho Athletic Stadium
	Sugimoto 88'	Summary	Kanazawa 38'; Rafael 43', 45'	Attendance: 5,804

26 May 2010 3	Nagoya Grampus	1–1	Cerezo Osaka	Mizuho Athletic Stadium
	Maki 43'	Summary	Komatsu 72'	Attendance: 4,831

30 May 2010 4	Kyoto Sanga F.C.	1–0	Nagoya Grampus	Nishikyogoku Athletic Stadium
	Yanagisawa 38'	Summary		Attendance: 16,017

5 June 2010 5	Vegalta Sendai	0–0	Nagoya Grampus	Yurtec Stadium Sendai
		Summary		Attendance: 9,862

9 June 2010 6	Nagoya Grampus	0–2	Albirex Niigata	Mizuho Athletic Stadium
		Summary	Marcio Richardes 20'; Michael 56'	Attendance: 3,909

=== Emperor's Cup ===
5 September 2010 2nd Round	Nagoya Grampus	3–0	Chukyo University	Suzuka Sports Garden, Suzuka
17:00	Burzanović 22'; Magnum 25'; Tamada 40'	Report		Attendance: 4,807; Referee: Nobutsugu Murakami

9 October 2010 3rd Round	Nagoya Grampus	2–1	Consadole Sapporo	Mizuho Athletic Stadium, Nagoya
13:00	N. Nakamura 61'; Hanai 88'	Report	Takaki 51'	Attendance: 3,087; Referee: Tadasu Hirose

17 November 2010 4th Round	Nagoya Grampus	1 – 1 (a.e.t.) (5–4 p)	Albirex Niigata	Mizuho Athletic Stadium, Nagoya
19:00	Alex Santos 7'	Report	A. Tanaka 68'	Attendance: 3,540; Referee: Yasuro Imamura
	Penalties
	Alex Santos (penalty scored); Y. Maki (penalty scored); Taguchi (penalty scored); K. Hashimoto (penalty scored); Isomura (penalty scored)		(penalty scored) Chiba; (penalty scored) D. Nishi; (penalty scored) Homma; (penalty missed) Kato; (penalty scored) Michael

25 December 2010 Quarterfinals	Kashima Antlers	2–1	Nagoya Grampus	Kashima Soccer Stadium, Kashima
13:00	Koroki 7'; Osako 78'	Report	Ogawa 76'	Attendance: 14,564; Referee: Yuichi Nishimura

== Squad statistics ==
=== Appearances and goals ===
No.	Pos	Nat	Player	Total		J League		J League Cup		Emperor's Cup	
No.	Pos	Nat	Player	Apps	Goals	Apps	Goals	Apps	Goals	Apps	Goals
1	GK	(Japan) JPN	Seigo Narazaki	34	0	34+0	0	0+0	0	0+0	0
2	DF	(Japan) JPN	Akira Takeuchi	11	0	6+0	0	2+0	0	3+0	0
3	DF	(Japan) JPN	Mitsuru Chiyotanda	25	1	16+0	0	6+0	1	3+0	0
4	DF	(Japan) JPN	Marcus Tulio Tanaka	31	6	29+0	6	2+0	0	0+0	0
5	DF	(Japan) JPN	Takahiro Masukawa	38	1	32+0	1	3+1	0	2+0	0
6	DF	(Japan) JPN	Shohei Abe	36	0	31+0	0	4+0	0	1+0	0
7	MF	(Japan) JPN	Naoshi Nakamura	34	1	27+0	1	4+0	0	3+0	0
8	MF	(Brazil) BRA	Magnum	35	3	31+0	2	1+1	0	2+0	1
9	FW	(Montenegro) MNE	Igor Burzanović	33	5	27+0	4	4+1	0	1+0	1
10	MF	(Japan) JPN	Yoshizumi Ogawa	42	3	34+0	2	4+2	0	2+0	1
11	FW	(Japan) JPN	Keiji Tamada	32	14	29+0	13	0+1	0	2+0	1
14	MF	(Japan) JPN	Keiji Yoshimura	21	0	14+0	0	4+1	0	2+0	0
16	FW	(Australia) AUS	Joshua Kennedy	32	18	31+0	17	1+0	1	0+0	0
17	FW	(Japan) JPN	Yuki Maki	15	1	6+0	0	4+1	1	1+3	0
19	FW	(Japan) JPN	Keita Sugimoto	27	1	18+0	0	2+3	1	3+1	0
20	MF	(Colombia) COL	Danilson Córdoba	32	4	26+0	4	5+0	0	1+0	0
21	GK	(Japan) JPN	Koji Nishimura	2	0	0+0	0	2+0	0	0+0	0
22	MF	(Japan) JPN	Koji Hashimoto	7	0	0+0	0	3+0	0	3+1	0
23	DF	(Japan) JPN	Genta Matsuo	1	0	0+0	0	0+0	0	1+0	0
24	MF	(Japan) JPN	Shinta Fukushima	1	0	1+0	0	0+0	0	0+0	0
25	MF	(Japan) JPN	Mu Kanazaki	30	4	25+0	4	2+1	0	2+0	0
26	DF	(Japan) JPN	Tatsuya Arai	1	0	0+0	0	0+0	0	0+1	0
27	MF	(Japan) JPN	Sho Hanai	7	1	0+0	0	2+2	0	1+2	1
28	MF	(Japan) JPN	Taishi Taguchi	5	0	0+0	0	0+2	0	1+2	0
29	FW	(Japan) JPN	Hikaru Kuba	2	0	0+0	0	0+1	0	0+1	0
31	GK	(Japan) JPN	Toru Hasegawa	0	0	0+0	0	0+0	0	0+0	0
32	DF	(Japan) JPN	Hayuma Tanaka	41	0	33+0	0	5+0	0	3+0	0
33	MF	(Japan) JPN	Ryota Isomura	1	0	0+0	0	0+0	0	0+1	0
38	MF	(Japan) JPN	Alessandro Santos	30	1	25+0	0	1+1	0	3+0	1
50	GK	(Japan) JPN	Yoshinari Takagi	8	0	0+0	0	4+0	0	4+0	0

Cup appearances to be added

=== Goal scorers ===
Place	Position	Nation	Number	Name	J-League	J-League Cup	Emperor's Cup	Total
1	FW	(Australia)	16	Joshua Kennedy	17	1	0	18
2	FW	(Japan)	11	Keiji Tamada	13	0	1	14
3	FW	(Montenegro)	9	Igor Burzanović	4	0	1	5
4	DF	(Japan)	4	Marcus Tulio Tanaka	4	0	0	4
4	MF	(Colombia)	20	Danilson Córdoba	4	0	0	4
4	MF	(Japan)	25	Mu Kanazaki	4	0	0	4
7	MF	(Brazil)	8	Magnum	2	0	1	3
7	MF	(Japan)	10	Yoshizumi Ogawa	2	0	1	3
9	MF	(Japan)	7	Naoshi Nakamura	1	0	1	2
10	DF	(Japan)	5	Takahiro Masukawa	1	0	0	1
10	FW	(Japan)	17	Yuki Maki	0	1	0	1
10	DF	(Japan)	3	Mitsuru Chiyotanda	0	1	0	1
10	FW	(Japan)	18	Keita Sugimoto	0	1	0	1
10	MF	(Japan)	27	Sho Hanai	0	0	1	1
10	MF	(Japan)	38	Alessandro Santos	0	0	1	1
				TOTALS	54	4	7	65

=== Disciplinary record ===
Number	Nation	Position	Name	J-League		J.League Cup		Emperor's Cup		Total	
Number	Nation	Position	Name	Yellow card	Red card	Yellow card	Red card	Yellow card	Red card	Yellow card	Red card
9	(Montenegro)	FW	Igor Burzanović	5	1	2	0	0	0	7	1
7	(Japan)	MF	Naoshi Nakamura	5	0	2	0	0	0	7	0
20	(Colombia)	MF	Danilson Córdoba	5	0	2	0	0	0	7	0
5	(Japan)	DF	Takahiro Masukawa	4	1	2	0	0	0	6	1
4	(Japan)	FW	Marcus Tulio Tanaka	6	0	0	0	0	0	6	0
25	(Japan)	MF	Mu Kanazaki	4	0	0	0	0	0	4	0
32	(Japan)	FW	Hayuma Tanaka	4	0	0	0	0	0	4	0
16	(Australia)	FW	Joshua Kennedy	3	0	0	0	0	0	3	0
10	(Japan)	MF	Yoshizumi Ogawa	3	0	0	0	0	0	3	0
3	(Japan)	DF	Mitsuru Chiyotanda	3	0	0	0	0	0	3	0
38	(Japan)	MF	Alessandro Santos	3	0	0	0	0	0	3	0
6	(Japan)	DF	Shohei Abe	3	0	0	0	0	0	3	0
11	(Japan)	FW	Keiji Tamada	2	0	0	0	0	0	2	0
8	(Brazil)	MF	Magnum	2	0	0	0	0	0	2	0
19	(Japan)	FW	Keita Sugimoto	1	0	1	0	0	0	2	0
50	(Japan)	GK	Yoshinari Takagi	0	1	0	0	0	0	0	1
1	(Japan)	GK	Seigo Narazaki	1	0	0	0	0	0	1	0
2	(Japan)	DF	Akira Takeuchi	0	0	1	0	0	0	1	0
14	(Japan)	MF	Keiji Yoshimura	0	0	1	0	0	0	1	0
			TOTALS	54	3	0	11	0	0	54	3
