= Alessandro Santos =

Brazilian-born Japanese footballer (born 1977)

Alessandro Santos 三都主 アレサンドロ
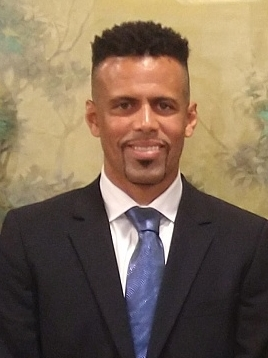
- Santos in 2019

Personal information
- Full name: Alessandro dos Santos
- Date of birth: 20 July 1977 (age 49)
- Place of birth: Maringá, Paraná, Brazil
- Height: 1.78 m (5 ft 10 in)
- Position: Midfielder

Youth career
- 1994–1996: Meitoku Gijuku High School

Senior career*
Years	Team	Apps	(Gls)
1997–2003	Shimizu S-Pulse	198	(56)
2004–2009	Urawa Reds	100	(11)
2007	→ Red Bull Salzburg (loan)	20	(1)
2009–2012	Nagoya Grampus	55	(0)
2013	Tochigi SC	25	(2)
2014	FC Gifu	18	(2)
2015	Maringá		
2015	Grêmio Maringá		
2016	PSTC		
Total		416+	(72+)

International career
2002–2006	Japan	82	(7)
Medal record
Shimizu S-Pulse
Runner-up	J1 League	1999
Winner	Emperor's Cup	2001
Runner-up	Emperor's Cup	1998
Runner-up	Emperor's Cup	2000
Urawa Reds
Winner	J1 League	2006
Runner-up	J1 League	2004
Runner-up	J1 League	2005
Runner-up	J.League Cup	2004
Winner	Emperor's Cup	2005
Winner	Emperor's Cup	2006
Nagoya Grampus
Winner	J1 League	2010
Runner-up	J1 League	2011
Runner-up	Emperor's Cup	2009
Representing Japan
AFC Asian Cup
Gold medal – first place	2004 China
- * Club domestic league appearances and goals

Alessandro Santos (三都主 アレサンドロ, Santosu Aresandoro; formerly Alessandro dos Santos; born 20 July 1977), often known as Alex, is a former professional footballer who played as a midfielder. Born in Brazil, he became a Japanese citizen and made 82 appearances for the Japan national team.

== Club career ==
Santos was born in Maringá in Paraná and moved to Japan in 1994 at the age of sixteen. He enrolled in Meitoku Gijuku High School in Kōchi and played football for the school club. After graduating from the school, he joined the J1 League team Shimizu S-Pulse in 1997. In 1999, the club won the second place and he received the J.League Player of the Year. In Asia, the club won the champions 1999–2000 Asian Cup Winners' Cup and third place 2000–01 Asian Cup Winners' Cup.

In August 2002, Santos agreed to join English Premier League club Charlton Athletic for a £2.5 million fee. He was denied a work permit by the Home Office because he had not made the minimum number of national team appearances required for players from outside the European Union, and returned to Shimizu for the remainder of the season. In January 2004, he left Shimizu to join the Urawa Reds. They would come in second place at J1 League for two consecutive seasons in (2004, 2005). The club won the 2006 J1 League title.

In January 2007, Santos was loaned out to Red Bull Salzburg. He went back to Urawa in January 2008. He received a serious injury in a test match and had only one appearance in this season. In July 2009, he agreed to move to Nagoya Grampus. He made 55 appearances for the club, before joining J2 League side Tochigi SC for the 2013 season. He made 25 appearances there, scoring twice. In January 2014, he joined fellow J2 League team FC Gifu.

== International career ==
In 2001, Santos obtained Japanese citizenship. He made his first appearance for Japan national team on 21 March 2002, against Ukraine, and he was part of Philippe Troussier's selection for the 2002 World Cup. He was the second non-Japan-born person to play for Japan in the World Cup finals. Wagner Lopes was the first who played in the 1998 World Cup. Santos became the fifth naturalized Japanese citizen to play for Japan following Daishiro Yoshimura, George Yonashiro, Ruy Ramos, and Lopes.

After Zico took over as the national team manager, Santos was used on the left side of the Japanese lineup, as a full-back in a 4-4-2 formation or a midfielder in a 3-5-2 formation. He played in all 6 matches of the 2004 Asian Cup; Japan won. He was selected in the Japan squad for the 2006 World Cup, providing an assist for Keiji Tamada in a group stage match against his birth country Brazil. He played 82 games and scored 7 goals for Japan.

== Others ==
In 2020, Alex founded Aruko Sports Brasil, a team that currently competes in the Campeonato Paranaense.

== Career statistics ==
=== Club ===
Appearances and goals by club, season and competition
Club	Season	League			National cup		League cup		Continental		Total	
Club	Season	Division	Apps	Goals	Apps	Goals	Apps	Goals	Apps	Goals	Apps	Goals
Shimizu S-Pulse	1997	J1 League	27	3	3	0	2	1	–		32	4
Shimizu S-Pulse	1998	J1 League	26	10	5	2	5	0	–		36	12
Shimizu S-Pulse	1999	J1 League	30	11	1	0	4	0	–		35	11
Shimizu S-Pulse	2000	J1 League	30	4	5	4	5	0	–		40	8
Shimizu S-Pulse	2001	J1 League	30	12	5	1	2	1	–		37	14
Shimizu S-Pulse	2002	J1 League	29	9	3	0	2	2	2	2	36	13
Shimizu S-Pulse	2003	J1 League	26	7	4	0	4	0	3	1	37	8
Shimizu S-Pulse	Total		198	56	26	7	24	4	5	3	253	70
Urawa Reds	2004	J1 League	27	2	2	1	1	0	–		30	3
Urawa Reds	2005	J1 League	32	4	5	0	5	0	–		42	4
Urawa Reds	2006	J1 League	34	5	1	0	0	0	–		35	5
Urawa Reds	Total		93	11	8	1	6	0	0	0	107	12
Red Bull Salzburg	2006–07	Austrian Bundesliga	9	0	–		–		–		9	0
Red Bull Salzburg	2007–08	Austrian Bundesliga	11	1	–		–		1	0	12	1
Red Bull Salzburg	Total		20	1	–		–		1	0	21	1
Urawa Reds	2008	J1 League	1	0	0	0	0	0	–		1	0
Urawa Reds	2009	J1 League	6	0	0	0	4	0	–		10	0
Urawa Reds	Total		7	0	0	0	4	0	0	0	11	0
Nagoya Grampus	2009	J1 League	14	0	6	1	0	0	4	0	24	1
Nagoya Grampus	2010	J1 League	25	0	3	1	1	0	–		29	1
Nagoya Grampus	2011	J1 League	11	0	4	0	1	0	3	0	19	0
Nagoya Grampus	2012	J1 League	5	0	2	0	0	0	1	0	8	0
Nagoya Grampus	Total		55	0	15	2	2	0	8	0	80	2
Tochigi SC	2013	J2 League	25	2	2	0	–		–		27	2
FC Gifu	2014	J2 League	18	2	0	0	–		–		18	2
Career total			416	72	51	10	36	4	14	3	517	89

=== International ===
Appearances and goals by national team and year
National team	Year	Apps	Goals
Japan	2002	9	1
Japan	2003	15	1
Japan	2004	22	2
Japan	2005	17	1
Japan	2006	19	2
Total		82	7

Scores and results list Japan's goal tally first, score column indicates score after each Santos goal.

List of international goals scored by Alessandro Santos
No.	Date	Venue	Opponent	Score	Result	Competition
1	2 May 2002	Kobe, Japan	Honduras		3–3	Friendly
2	7 December 2003	Saitama, Japan	Hong Kong		1–0	East Asian Football Championship 2003
3	12 February 2004	Tokyo, Japan	Iraq		2–0	Friendly
4	30 May 2004	Manchester, England	Iceland		3–2	Friendly
5	29 January 2005	Yokohama, Japan	Kazakhstan		4–0	Friendly
6	9 August 2006	Tokyo, Japan	Trinidad and Tobago		2–0	Friendly
7	9 August 2006	Tokyo, Japan	Trinidad and Tobago		2–0	Friendly

== Honours ==
Shimizu S-Pulse

- Asian Cup Winners' Cup: 1999–2000
- Emperor's Cup: 2001
- Japanese Super Cup: 2002

Urawa Red Diamonds

- J1 League: 2006
- Emperor's Cup: 2005, 2006
- Japanese Super Cup: 2002, 2006

Red Bull Salzburg

- Austrian Bundesliga: 2006–07

Nagoya Grampus

- J1 League: 2010

Japan

- AFC Asian Cup: 2004

Individual

- J.League MVP: 1999
- J1 League Best Eleven: 1999
