= Yōsuke Ishibitsu =

Japanese footballer (born 1983)

Yōsuke Ishibitsu 石櫃 洋祐
Personal information
- Full name: Yōsuke Ishibitsu
- Date of birth: 23 July 1983 (age 43)
- Place of birth: Settsu, Osaka, Japan
- Height: 1.78 m (5 ft 10 in)
- Position: Defender

Youth career
- 2002–2005: Osaka Gakuin University

Senior career*
Years	Team	Apps	(Gls)
2006–2011	Vissel Kobe	129	(6)
2012–2013	Nagoya Grampus	11	(0)
2014–2020	Kyoto Sanga	237	(9)
- * Club domestic league appearances and goals as of 3 January 2021

Yōsuke Ishibitsu (石櫃 洋祐, Ishibitsu Yōsuke; born 23 July 1983 in Settsu, Osaka) is a former Japanese footballer.

== Career statistics ==
Updated to end of 2020 season.

Club performance			League		Cup		League Cup		Continental		Total	
Season	Club	League	Apps	Goals	Apps	Goals	Apps	Goals	Apps	Goals	Apps	Goals
Japan			League		Emperor's Cup		J. League Cup		AFC		Total	
2006	Vissel Kobe	J2 League	0	0	0	0	-		-		0	0
2007	Vissel Kobe	J1 League	27	1	2	0	3	0	-		32	1
2008	Vissel Kobe	J1 League	28	2	2	0	5	0	-		35	1
2009	Vissel Kobe	J1 League	30	2	3	2	5	1	-		38	5
2010	Vissel Kobe	J1 League	28	0	2	0	4	0	-		34	0
2011	Vissel Kobe	J1 League	16	1	1	0	2	0	-		19	1
2012	Nagoya Grampus	J1 League	10	0	1	0	2	0	3	0	16	0
2013	Nagoya Grampus	J1 League	1	0	1	0	1	0	-		3	0
2014	Kyoto Sanga	J2 League	39	1	1	0	-		-		40	1
2015	Kyoto Sanga	J2 League	39	2	2	0	-		-		41	2
2016	Kyoto Sanga	J2 League	39	2	0	0	-		-		39	2
2017	Kyoto Sanga	J2 League	40	1	1	0	-		-		41	1
2018	Kyoto Sanga	J2 League	40	1	0	0	-		-		40	1
2019	Kyoto Sanga	J2 League	23	2	1	0	-		-		24	2
2020	Kyoto Sanga	J2 League	17	0	-		-		-		17	0
Career total			377	15	17	2	22	1	3	0	418	18
