= Koji Nishimura =

Japanese footballer

Koji Nishimura 西村 弘司
Personal information
- Full name: Koji Nishimura
- Date of birth: July 7, 1984 (age 42)
- Place of birth: Iga, Mie, Japan
- Height: 1.86 m (6 ft 1 in)
- Position: Goalkeeper

Youth career
- 2000–2002: Yokkaichi Chuo Technical High School

Senior career*
Years	Team	Apps	(Gls)
2003–2007	Kyoto Sanga FC	39	(0)
2008–2016	Nagoya Grampus	5	(0)
Total		44	(0)
Medal record
Nagoya Grampus
Winner	J1 League	2010
Runner-up	J1 League	2011
Runner-up	Emperor's Cup	2009
- * Club domestic league appearances and goals

Koji Nishimura (西村 弘司, Nishimura Koji; born July 7, 1984) is a former Japanese football player.

== Playing career ==
Nishimura was released by Nagoya Grampus after nine-season with the club on 10 November 2016, going on to announce his retirement from the game on 30 December 2016.

== Club statistics ==
As of match played 23 March 2016

Club	Season	League			National Cup		League Cup		Continental		Total	
Club	Season	Division	Apps	Goals	Apps	Goals	Apps	Goals	Apps	Goals	Apps	Goals
Kyoto Purple Sanga	2003	J1 League	0	0	0	0	0	0	-		0	0
Kyoto Purple Sanga	2004	J2 League	19	0	1	0	0	0	-		20	0
Kyoto Purple Sanga	2005	J2 League	4	0	1	0	0	0	-		5	0
Kyoto Purple Sanga	2006	J1 League	16	0	1	0	2	0	-		19	0
Kyoto Sanga FC	2007	J2 League	0	0	0	0	0	0	-		0	0
Kyoto Sanga FC	Total		39	0	3	0	2	0	-		44	0
Nagoya Grampus	2008	J1 League	4	0	2	0	8	0	-		14	0
Nagoya Grampus	2009	J1 League	1	0	2	0	1	0	1	0	5	0
Nagoya Grampus	2010	J1 League	0	0	0	0	2	0	-		2	0
Nagoya Grampus	2011	J1 League	0	0	0	0	0	0	0	0	0	0
Nagoya Grampus	2012	J1 League	0	0	0	0	0	0	0	0	0	0
Nagoya Grampus	2013	J1 League	0	0	0	0	0	0	-		0	0
Nagoya Grampus	2014	J1 League	0	0	0	0	0	0	-		0	0
Nagoya Grampus	2015	J1 League	0	0	0	0	0	0	-		0	0
Nagoya Grampus	2016	J1 League	0	0	0	0	1	0	-		1	0
Nagoya Grampus	Total		5	0	4	0	12	0	1	0	22	0
Career total			44	0	7	0	14	0	1	0	66	0
