= Masaya Sato =

Japanese footballer

Personal information
- Full name: Masaya Sato
- Date of birth: February 10, 1990 (age 36)
- Place of birth: Shizuoka, Japan
- Height: 1.81 m (5 ft 11 1/2 in)
- Position: Defender

Senior career*
Years	Team	Apps	(Gls)
2008–2009	Nagoya Grampus	2	(0)
2010	Thespa Kusatsu	10	(0)
2011–2012	FC Ryukyu	33	(3)
2013–2015	Fujieda MYFC	83	(4)
Total		128	(7)
Medal record
Nagoya Grampus
Runner-up	Emperor's Cup	2009
- * Club domestic league appearances and goals

Masaya Sato (佐藤 将也, Satō Masaya; born February 10, 1990) is a former Japanese football player.

== Career statistics ==
Appearances and goals by club, season and competition
Club	Season	League			Emperor's Cup		J.League Cup		Asia		Total	
Club	Season	Division	Apps	Goals	Apps	Goals	Apps	Goals	Apps	Goals	Apps	Goals
Nagoya Grampus	2008	J1 League	0	0	0	0	1	0	-		1	0
Nagoya Grampus	2009	J1 League	2	0	0	0	2	0	5	0	9	0
Thespa Kusatsu	2010	J2 League	10	0	0	0	-		-		10	0
FC Ryukyu	2011	Football League					-		-			
FC Ryukyu	2012	Football League	23	1	0	0	-		-		23	1
Fujieda MYFC	2013	Football League	26	1	2	0	-		-		28	1
Career total			61	2	2	0	3	0	5	0	71	2
