= Yoshiki Hiraki =

Japanese footballer

Personal information
- Date of birth: October 17, 1986 (age 40)
- Place of birth: Yachimata, Chiba, Japan
- Height: 1.73 m (5 ft 8 in)
- Position: Midfielder

Youth career
- 2005–2008: Ryutsu Keizai University

Senior career*
Years	Team	Apps	(Gls)
2009	Nagoya Grampus	0	(0)
2010	Roasso Kumamoto	11	(1)
2011	Shonan Bellmare	3	(0)
2012	Blaublitz Akita	17	(1)
2013	Vonds Ichihara	3	(0)
2014	Blaublitz Akita	6	(0)
Total		40	(2)
Medal record
Nagoya Grampus
Runner-up	Emperor's Cup	2009
- * Club domestic league appearances and goals

Yoshiki Hiraki (平木 良樹, Hiraki Yoshiki; born October 17, 1986) is a former Japanese football player.

He previously played for Roasso Kumamoto and Shonan Bellmare.
