= Miloš Bajalica =

Serbian footballer

Personal information
- Date of birth: 15 December 1981 (age 44)
- Place of birth: Belgrade, SFR Yugoslavia
- Height: 1.85 m (6 ft 1 in)
- Position: Centre-back

Senior career*
Years	Team	Apps	(Gls)
2000–2002	Kneževac	49	(3)
2002–2007	OFK Belgrade	72	(5)
2003	→ Njegoš Lovćenac (loan)	30	(4)
2007	Red Star Belgrade	13	(0)
2008–2009	Nagoya Grampus	39	(0)
2010	Henan Construction	10	(1)
2010–2011	Shaanxi Chanba	41	(3)
2012–2015	Kyoto Sanga	134	(7)
2016–2019	Radnički Kovači	0	(0)
- * Club domestic league appearances and goals as of 15 September 2016

Miloš Bajalica (pronounced [mǐloʃ bǎːjalitsa]; Serbian Cyrillic: Милош Бајалица; born 15 December 1981) is a Serbian retired footballer who last played as a defender for Radnički Kovači.

== Career ==
He proved his quality while playing for OFK Beograd. He was named captain at OFK by new manager Ratko Dostanić. Bajalica caught the attention of many clubs and eventually signed with neighbours Red Star Belgrade. In 2008, he moved to Japan to play for Nagoya Grampus. He was released by Nagoya Grampus at the end of Season 2009. On 17 February 2010, it was announced on the official website of Henan Construction that Bajalica signed for them to join his Serbian compatriot Goran Gavrančić. He then moved to Shaanxi Chanba, but left after not having a successful second season to Kyoto Sanga FC. In summer 2016 Bajalica joined Morava Zone League side Radnički Kovači.
