= Keita Sugimoto =

Japanese footballer

Personal information
- Full name: Keita Sugimoto
- Date of birth: June 13, 1982 (age 44)
- Place of birth: Itako, Ibaraki, Japan
- Height: 1.73 m (5 ft 8 in)
- Position: Forward

Team information
- Current team: Verspah Oita
- Number: 32

Youth career
- 2001–2004: Ryutsu Keizai University

Senior career*
Years	Team	Apps	(Gls)
2005–2010	Nagoya Grampus Eight	173	(27)
2011–2012	Tokushima Vortis	16	(0)
2013	Hoyo Oita	29	(4)
2014–2015	Chiangrai United		
2016–2019	Verspah Oita		
Total		218	(31)
Medal record
Nagoya Grampus
Winner	J1 League	2010
Runner-up	Emperor's Cup	2009
- * Club domestic league appearances and goals

Keita Sugimoto (杉本 恵太, Sugimoto Keita; born June 13, 1982) is a former Japanese football player.

His profile was raised when he scored an overhead kick from a tight angle (on the volley) while playing against Al-Ittihad in the AFC Champions League semi-final second round. His third daughter, Riina Sugimoto joined the idol group SKE48 as the 11th Generation.

== Club statistics ==
Club performance			League		Cup		League Cup		Continental		Total	
Season	Club	League	Apps	Goals	Apps	Goals	Apps	Goals	Apps	Goals	Apps	Goals
Japan			League		Emperor's Cup		League Cup		Asia		Total	
2005	Nagoya Grampus Eight	J1 League	29	3	2	0	5	0	-		36	3
2006	Nagoya Grampus Eight	J1 League	32	8	1	0	5	0	-		38	8
2007	Nagoya Grampus Eight	J1 League	34	7	1	0	2	0	-		37	7
2008	Nagoya Grampus	J1 League	33	7	3	1	9	5	-		45	13
2009	Nagoya Grampus	J1 League	27	2	5	1	2	0	7	1	41	4
2010	Nagoya Grampus	J1 League							-			
Career total			155	27	12	2	23	5	7	1	197	35
