= Shohei Abe =

Japanese footballer (born 1983)

Shohei Abe 阿部 翔平
Personal information
- Full name: Shohei Abe
- Date of birth: 1 December 1983 (age 42)
- Place of birth: Chiba Prefecture, Japan
- Height: 1.71 m (5 ft 7 in)
- Position: Left-back

Team information
- Current team: Shibuya City FC

Youth career
- 1999–2001: Municipal Funabashi High School

College career
Years	Team	Apps	(Gls)
2002–2005	University of Tsukuba		

Senior career*
Years	Team	Apps	(Gls)
2006–2013	Nagoya Grampus	226	(0)
2014–2015	Ventforet Kofu	67	(2)
2016–2018	JEF United Chiba	33	(1)
2017–2018	→ Ventforet Kofu (loan)	24	(1)
2018	Ventforet Kofu	5	(0)
2019–	Shibuya City FC		

Managerial career
- 2022: Shibuya City FC
- * Club domestic league appearances and goals as of 22 February 2019, 11:44 (UTC)

Shohei Abe (阿部 翔平, Abe Shōhei; born 1 December 1983) is a Japanese footballer who plays as a left-back for Shibuya City FC. He managed the club during the 2022 season.

== Career ==
=== Nagoya Grampus ===
Abe started his professional career with Nagoya Grampus in the 2006 season. In his first season, he made twelve appearances in all competitions. He spent eight years with the Prefecture club, making 226 league appearances, along with winning the J1 League and Emperor's Cup. However, in his time with the club, he only scored once. That came in the 2008 Emperor's Cup.

=== Ventforet Kofu ===
In January 2014, Abe transferred to Ventforet Kofu on a free transfer. He spent two seasons with the club, making 75 appearances in all competitions and scoring twice.

=== JEF United Chiba ===
In January 2016, Abe was sold to JEF United Chiba. In his only season playing with them, he made 34 appearances in all competitions, scoring once.

=== Return to Ventforet Kofu ===
In March 2017, Abe was loaned out to his former club, Ventforet Kofu. He made 24 league appearances with Kofu before his loan expired on 31 January 2018. He completed his transfer to Ventforet a day later.

=== Tokyo City FC ===
On 18 February 2019 it was announced, that Abe had joined Tokyo City FC.

== Managerial career ==
On 1 December 2021, Abe was officially announced as appointment manager of Shibuya City FC (previously Tokyo City FC) from the 2022 season.

== Club statistics ==
Updated to the end 2019 season.

Appearances and goals by club, season and competition
Club	Season	League			Emperor's Cup		J. League Cup		Asia		Total	
Club	Season	Division	Apps	Goals	Apps	Goals	Apps	Goals	Apps	Goals	Apps	Goals
Nagoya Grampus	2006	J1 League	9	0	0	0	3	0	—		12	0
Nagoya Grampus	2007	J1 League	27	0	2	0	5	0	—		34	0
Nagoya Grampus	2008	J1 League	34	0	2	0	8	1	—		44	1
Nagoya Grampus	2009	J1 League	32	0	5	0	1	0	8	0	46	0
Nagoya Grampus	2010	J1 League	31	0	1	0	6	0	—		38	0
Nagoya Grampus	2011	J1 League	32	0	1	0	2	0	7	0	42	0
Nagoya Grampus	2012	J1 League	29	0	3	0	2	0	6	0	40	0
Nagoya Grampus	2013	J1 League	32	0	1	0	5	0	—		38	0
Ventforet Kofu	2014	J1 League	34	1	1	0	4	0	—		39	1
Ventforet Kofu	2015	J1 League	33	1	0	0	3	0	—		36	1
JEF United Chiba	2016	J2 League	33	1	1	0	—		—		34	1
JEF United Chiba	2017	J2 League	0	0	0	0	—		—		24	1
Ventforet Kofu	2017	J1 League	24	1	1	0	0	0	0	0	25	1
Ventforet Kofu	2018	J2 League	5	0	3	0	4	0	0	0	12	0
Career total			355	4	23	1	43	1	21	0	442	6

== Honours ==
Nagoya Grampus

- J1 League: 2010
- Japanese Super Cup: 2011
