= Yoshizumi Ogawa =

Japanese footballer

Yoshizumi Ogawa 小川 佳純
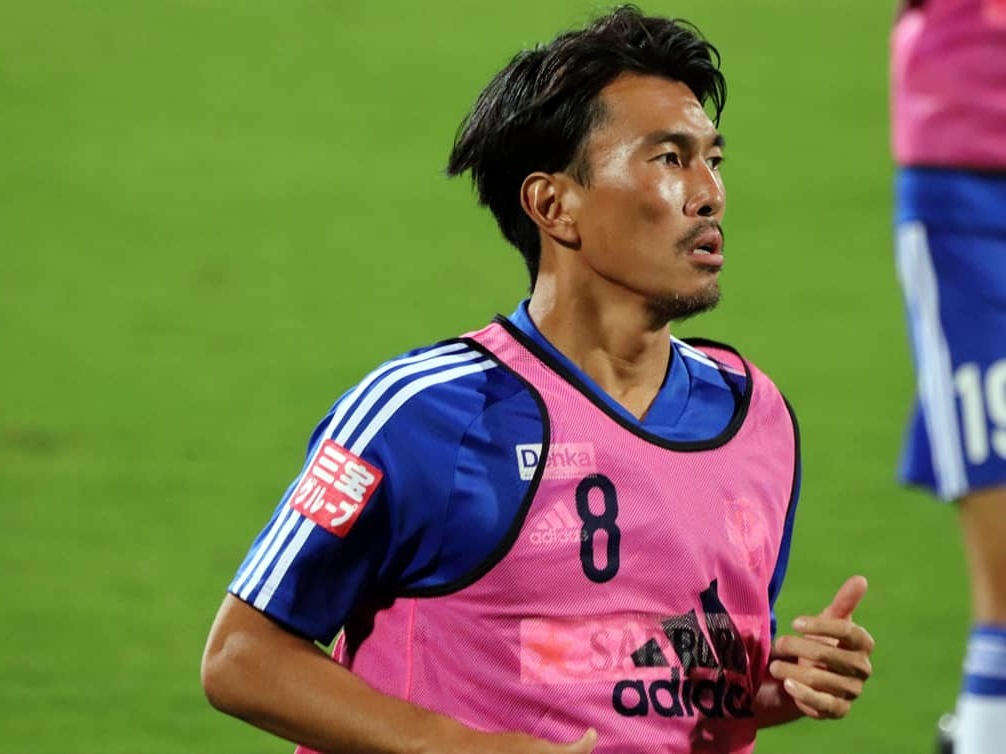

Personal information
- Full name: Yoshizumi Ogawa
- Date of birth: 25 August 1984 (age 42)
- Place of birth: Suginami, Tokyo, Japan
- Height: 1.73 m (5 ft 8 in)
- Position: Midfielder

Team information
- Current team: Sagan Tosu (Assistant manager)

Youth career
- 2000–2002: Ichiritsu Funabashi High School

College career
Years	Team	Apps	(Gls)
2003–2006	Meiji University		

Senior career*
Years	Team	Apps	(Gls)
2007–2016	Nagoya Grampus	234	(36)
2017	Sagan Tosu	5	(0)
2017	→ Albirex Niigata (loan)	10	(1)
2018–2019	Albirex Niigata	36	(3)

Managerial career
- 2020–2022: TIAMO Hirakata
- 2023–: Sagan Tosu (assistant)
Medal record
Nagoya Grampus
Winner	J1 League	2010
Runner-up	J1 League	2011
Runner-up	Emperor's Cup	2009
- * Club domestic league appearances and goals

Yoshizumi Ogawa (小川 佳純, Ogawa Yoshizumi; born 25 August 1984 in Tokyo) is a Japanese retired footballer and assistant manager of Sagan Tosu from 2023.

== Career ==
=== Club ===
Ogawa was released by Nagoya Grampus after 10 years with the club on 10 November 2016 following the club's relegation to J2 League.

=== Manager ===
After retiring at the end of 2019, Ogawa was appointed head coach of TIAMO Hirakata on 17 January 2020.

On 26 September 2022, Ogawa left from the club after 7 months at Tiamo Hirakata.

On 1 December 2022, He appointment assistant manager of J1 club, Sagan Tosu from 2023.

== Career statistics ==
=== Club ===
Updated to end of 2019 season.

Appearances and goals by club, season and competition
Club	Season	League			National Cup		League Cup		Continental		Total	
Club	Season	Division	Apps	Goals	Apps	Goals	Apps	Goals	Apps	Goals	Apps	Goals
Nagoya Grampus	2007	J1 League	11	2	2	0	2	0	-		15	2
Nagoya Grampus	2008	J1 League	33	11	3	0	9	2	-		45	13
Nagoya Grampus	2009	J1 League	33	3	5	0	2	1	10	5	50	9
Nagoya Grampus	2010	J1 League	34	2	2	1	6	0	-		42	3
Nagoya Grampus	2011	J1 League	34	3	3	1	2	0	7	0	46	4
Nagoya Grampus	2012	J1 League	31	1	4	2	2	0	5	0	42	3
Nagoya Grampus	2013	J1 League	33	9	1	0	4	0	-		38	9
Nagoya Grampus	2014	J1 League	25	3	4	1	4	2	-		33	6
Nagoya Grampus	2015	J1 League	32	1	0	0	4	1	-		36	2
Nagoya Grampus	2016	J1 League	20	1	1	0	6	0	-		27	1
Sagan Tosu	2017	J1 League	5	0	1	0	4	0	-		10	0
Albirex Niigata	2017	J1 League	10	1	-		-		-		10	1
Albirex Niigata	2018	J2 League	21	2	0	0	0	0	-		21	2
Albirex Niigata	2019	J2 League	5	0	0	0	0	0	-		5	0
Career total			327	39	26	5	46	6	22	5	420	55

== Honours ==
Club

- J. League Division 1 - 2010
- Japanese Super Cup - 2011

Individual

- J. League Rookie of the Year - 2008
- J. League Best Eleven - 2008
