= Keiji Tamada =

Japanese footballer (born 1980)

Keiji Tamada 玉田 圭司
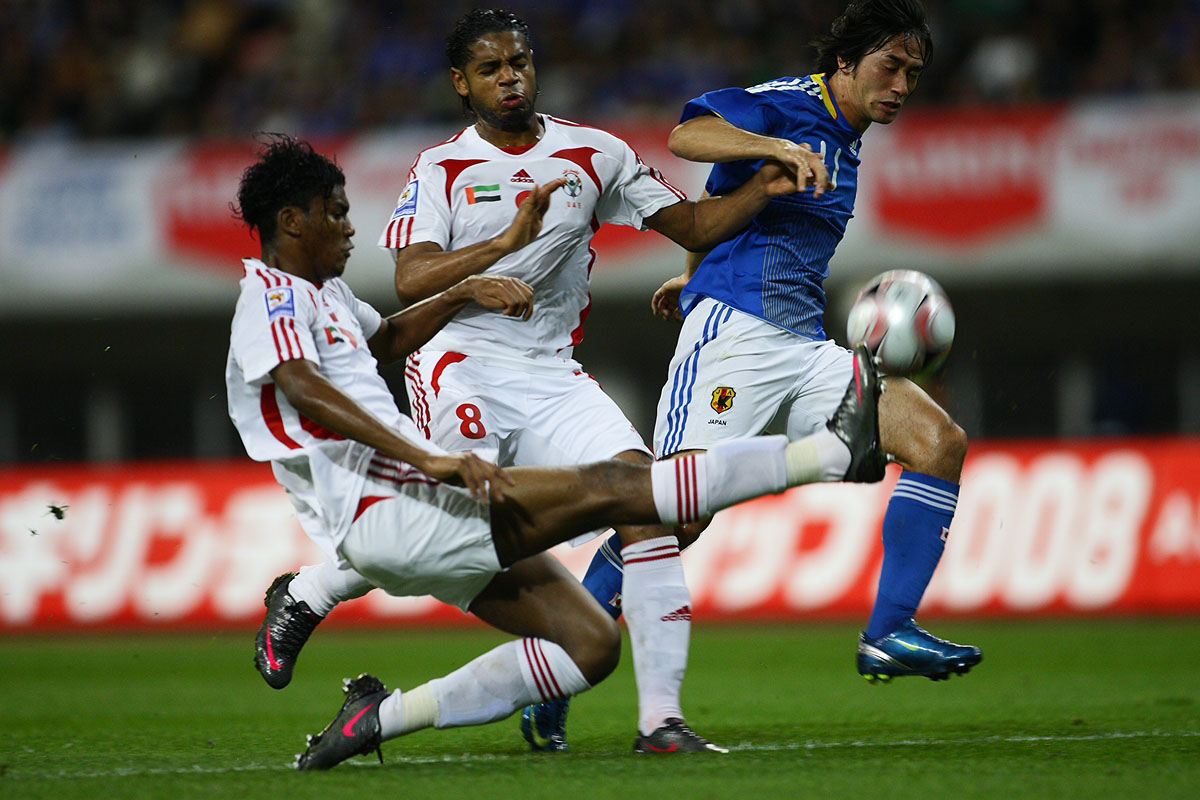
- Tamada (right) escaping a defender

Personal information
- Full name: Keiji Tamada
- Date of birth: 11 April 1980 (age 46)
- Place of birth: Urayasu, Chiba, Japan
- Height: 1.73 m (5 ft 8 in)
- Position: Forward

Youth career
- 1996–1998: Narashino High School

Senior career*
Years	Team	Apps	(Gls)
1999–2005	Kashiwa Reysol	109	(30)
2006–2014	Nagoya Grampus	233	(66)
2015–2016	Cerezo Osaka	57	(13)
2017–2018	Nagoya Grampus	52	(9)
2019–2021	V-Varen Nagasaki	79	(15)
Total		532	(133)

International career
2004–2010	Japan	72	(16)
Medal record
Kashiwa Reysol
Winner	J.League Cup	1999
Nagoya Grampus
Winner	J1 League	2010
Runner-up	J1 League	2011
Runner-up	Emperor's Cup	2009
Representing Japan
AFC Asian Cup
Gold medal – first place	2004 China
- * Club domestic league appearances and goals

Keiji Tamada (玉田 圭司, Tamada Keiji; born 11 April 1980) is a Japanese former professional footballer who played as a forward. He is currently the manager of Nagoya Grampus' U-21 team.

== Club career ==
Tamada joined Kashiwa Reysol from Narashino High School in 1999. His debut was the game against Avispa Fukuoka on 13 March 1999. Kashiwa Reysol won the J.League Cup tile that year. He was not a key player from the start. His prominence grew gradually, especially in the latter half of the 2002 season. He was selected to the Japan national team in 2004. He transferred to Nagoya Grampus Eight (later Nagoya Grampus) taking the opportunity of Kashiwa Reysol's relegation to J2 in 2006. He took an active part in the 2008 season and Nagoya participated in the AFC Champions League for the first time. He enumerated two goals in 2009 AFC Champions League for Nagoya Grampus and contributed to the team's semifinal advancement. Nagoya Grampus won the J1 League Championship in 2010. He played for Cerezo Osaka in the 2015 season.

On 29 December 2016, Tamada re-joined Nagoya Grampus. He signed another one-year contract with the club on 20 December 2017. On 6 December 2018, Tamada was released by Nagoya Grampus.

In 2019, Tamada moved to J2 League club V-Varen Nagasaki.

== International career ==
Tamada made his field debut as a member of the Japan national team against Singapore in 2006 FIFA World Cup qualification on 31 March 2004. He scored three goals in the 2004 AFC Asian Cup, and this contributed to the Japan national team's top place finish. He was a member of the Japan team at the 2006 FIFA World Cup. He scored a goal against Brazil in the first round of that World Cup. He scored two goals in 2010 FIFA World Cup qualification matches helping Japan reach the 2010 FIFA World Cup. He participated in two games at the 2010 World Cup. He played 72 games and scored 16 goals for Japan until 2010.

== Career statistics ==
=== Club ===
Appearances and goals by club, season and competition
Club	Season	League			National cup (Note: Includes Emperor's Cup)		League cup (Note: Includes J.League Cup)		Continental		Other		Total	
Club	Season	Division	Apps	Goals	Apps	Goals	Apps	Goals	Apps	Goals	Apps	Goals	Apps	Goals
Kashiwa Reysol	1999	J.League Division 1	5	0	0	0	1	0	–		–		6	0
Kashiwa Reysol	2000	J.League Division 1	5	0	0	0	1	0	–		–		6	0
Kashiwa Reysol	2001	J.League Division 1	2	0	0	0	0	0	–		–		2	0
Kashiwa Reysol	2002	J.League Division 1	13	3	1	0	2	0	–		–		16	3
Kashiwa Reysol	2003	J.League Division 1	28	11	2	1	5	0	–		–		35	12
Kashiwa Reysol	2004	J.League Division 1	30	10	0	0	0	0	–		–		30	10
Kashiwa Reysol	2005	J.League Division 1	28	6	0	0	0	0	–		–		28	6
Kashiwa Reysol	Total		111	30	3	1	9	0	0	0	0	0	123	31
Nagoya Grampus Eight	2006	J.League Division 1	26	6	2	0	1	0	0	0	0	0	29	6
Nagoya Grampus Eight	2007	J.League Division 1	14	5	2	0	4	2	0	0	0	0	20	7
Nagoya Grampus	2008	J.League Division 1	31	4	1	0	2	0	0	0	0	0	34	4
Nagoya Grampus	2009	J.League Division 1	27	8	4	1	1	0	9 (Note: Appearances in AFC Champions League)	2	0	0	41	11
Nagoya Grampus	2010	J.League Division 1	29	13	2	1	1	0	0	0	0	0	32	14
Nagoya Grampus	2011	J.League Division 1	33	14	3	0	0	0	3	0	1 (Note: Appearance in Japanese Super Cup)	0	40	14
Nagoya Grampus	2012	J.League Division 1	25	5	3	1	0	0	7	2	0	0	35	8
Nagoya Grampus	2013	J.League Division 1	31	9	1	0	6	2	0	0	0	0	38	11
Nagoya Grampus	2014	J.League Division 1	17	2	2	2	4	1	0	0	0	0	23	5
Nagoya Grampus	Total		233	66	20	5	19	5	19	4	1	0	292	80
Cerezo Osaka	2015	J2 League	33	10	0	0	–		–		2 (Note: Appearance in J1/J2 play-offs)	1	35	11
Cerezo Osaka	2016	J2 League	24	3	2	1	–		–		0	0	26	4
Cerezo Osaka	Total		57	13	2	1	0	0	0	0	2	1	61	15
Nagoya Grampus	2017	J2 League	28	6	1	0	0	0	0	0	2	0	31	6
Nagoya Grampus	2018	J1 League	24	3	1	0	3	0	0	0	0	0	28	3
Nagoya Grampus	Total		52	9	2	0	3	0	0	0	2	0	59	9
V-Varen Nagasaki	2019	J2 League	35	7	0	0	0	0	–		–		35	7
V-Varen Nagasaki	2020	J2 League	25	6	0	0	0	0	–		–		25	6
V-Varen Nagasaki	2021	J2 League	19	2	2	0	0	0	–		–		21	2
V-Varen Nagasaki	Total		79	15	2	0	0	0	0	0	0	0	81	15
Career total			532	133	29	7	31	5	19	4	5	1	616	150

=== International ===
Appearances and goals by national team and year
National team	Year	Apps	Goals
Japan	2004	18	5
Japan	2005	16	2
Japan	2006	7	2
Japan	2007	0	0
Japan	2008	12	4
Japan	2009	10	1
Japan	2010	9	2
Total		72	16

Scores and results list Japan's goal tally first, score column indicates score after each Tamada goal.

List of international goals scored by Keiji Tamada
No.	Date	Venue	Opponent	Score	Result	Competition	Ref.
1	25 April 2004	ZTE Arena, Zalaegerszeg, Hungary	Hungary	1–2	2–3	Friendly	
2	3 August 2004	Shandong Provincial Stadium, Jinan, China	Bahrain	2–1	4–3	2004 AFC Asian Cup	
3	3 August 2004	Shandong Provincial Stadium, Jinan, China	Bahrain	4–3	4–3	2004 AFC Asian Cup	
4	7 August 2004	Workers' Stadium, Beijing, China	China	3–1	3–1	2004 AFC Asian Cup	
5	17 November 2004	Saitama Stadium 2002, Saitama, Japan	Singapore	1–0	1–0	2006 FIFA World Cup qualification	
6	29 January 2005	International Stadium Yokohama, Yokohama, Japan	Kazakhstan	1–0	4–0	Friendly	
7	29 January 2005	International Stadium Yokohama, Yokohama, Japan	Kazakhstan	4–0	4–0	Friendly	
8	4 June 2006	LTU Arena, Düsseldorf, Germany	Malta	1–0	1–0	Friendly	
9	22 June 2006	Westfalenstadion, Dortmund, Germany	Brazil	1–0	1–4	2006 FIFA World Cup	
10	24 May 2008	Toyota Stadium, Toyota, Japan	Ivory Coast	1–0	1–0	Friendly	
11	15 October 2008	Saitama Stadium 2002, Saitama, Japan	Uzbekistan	1–1	1–1	2010 FIFA World Cup qualification	
12	13 November 2008	Home's Stadium Kobe, Kobe, Japan	Syria	2–0	3–1	Friendly	
13	19 November 2008	Jassim bin Hamad Stadium, Doha, Qatar	Qatar	2–0	3–0	2010 FIFA World Cup qualification	
14	9 September 2009	Stadion Galgenwaard, Utrecht, Netherlands	Ghana	2–3	4–3	Friendly	
15	11 February 2010	National Stadium, Tokyo, Japan	Hong Kong	1–0	3–0	2010 East Asian Football Championship	
16	11 February 2010	National Stadium, Tokyo, Japan	Hong Kong	3–0	3–0	2010 East Asian Football Championship	

== Honors ==
Kashiwa Reysol

- J.League Cup: 1999

Nagoya Grampus

- J1 League: 2010
- Japanese Super Cup: 2011

Japan

- AFC Asian Cup: 2004

Individual

- East Asian Football Championship top scorer: 2010
