= 2011 Emperor's Cup =

Tournament details
- Country: Japan
- Teams: 88

Final positions
- Champions: FC Tokyo (1st title)
- Runners-up: Kyoto Sanga

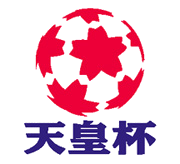
Emperor cup's logo

The 91st Emperor's Cup (第91回天皇杯) was a regular edition of an annual Japanese national cup tournament. It started on 3 September 2011 and ended on 1 January 2012 with the final at National Stadium in Tokyo, Japan, won by FC Tokyo 4–2 against Kyoto Sanga.

The cup winner were guaranteed a place in the 2012 AFC Champions League.

== Calendar ==
Round	Date	Matches	Clubs	New entries this round
First Round	3, 4, 7, 14(*1) September	24	48 → 24	47 Prefectural Qualifying Cup winners; 1 University Qualifying Cup winning club
Second Round	8, 10, 12(*2) October	32	24+18+20+2 → 32	18 J1 clubs; 20 J2 clubs; 2 JFL seeded clubs
Third Round	16 November	16	32 → 16	
Fourth Round	17, 21(*3) December	8	16 → 8	
Quarterfinals	24 December	4	8 → 4	
Semifinals	29 December	2	4 → 2	
Final	1 January 2012	1	2 → 1	

(*1)a total number of four games were postponed to 7 or 14 September due to tropical storm.
(*2)a total number of eight games were postponed to 12 October due to event clashes of quarterfinals of 2011 J.League Cup, and November 9 was reserved for Cerezo Osaka and Hokkaido University of Education Iwamizawa Campus in case of event clashes if Cerezo entered the 2011 AFC Champions League semi-finals (but game was not postponed as Cerezo was eliminated in quarter-finals).
(*3)Kashiwa Reysol's game was postponed to 21 December due to the participation in 2011 FIFA Club World Cup.

== Participating clubs ==
=== Starting in the first round ===
Prefectural finals winners – 47 teams

- Hokkaidō – Hokkaido UE Iwamizawa
- Aomori – Hachinohe University
- Iwate – Grulla Morioka
- Miyagi – Sony Sendai*
- Akita – Blaublitz Akita
- Yamagata – Yamagata University Faculty of Medicine
- Fukushima – Fukushima United
- Ibaraki – University of Tsukuba
- Tochigi – Tochigi Uva
- Gunma – Arte Takasaki
- Saitama – Heisei International University
- Chiba – Kashiwa Reysol U-18
- Tokyo – Machida Zelvia
- Kanagawa – YSCC Yokohama
- Yamanashi – Yamanashi Gakuin University High School
- Nagano – Matsumoto Yamaga
- Niigata – Japan Soccer College
- Toyama – Toyama Shinjo Club
- Ishikawa – Zweigen Kanazawa
- Fukui – Maruoka Phoenix
- Shizuoka – Shizuoka Sangyo University
- Aichi – Chukyo University
- Mie – Suzuka Rampole
- Gifu – FC Gifu Second
- Shiga – Sagawa Shiga
- Kyoto – SP Kyoto
- Osaka – Hannan University
- Hyōgo – Sanyo Electric Sumoto SC
- Nara – Nara Club
- Wakayama – Arterivo Wakayama
- Tottori – Yonago Kita High School
- Shimane – Dezzolla Shimane
- Okayama – Fagiano Okayama Next
- Hiroshima – Hiroshima University of Economics
- Yamaguchi – Renofa Yamaguchi FC
- Kagawa – Kamatamare Sanuki
- Tokushima – Sanyo Electric Tokushima SC
- Ehime – Ehime FC Shimanami
- Kochi – Kōchi University
- Fukuoka – Fukuoka University
- Saga – Saga Lixil
- Nagasaki – V-Varen Nagasaki
- Kumamoto – Kumamoto Teachers SC
- Ōita – Hoyo AC Elan Ōita
- Miyazaki – Miyazaki Sangyo-keiei University
- Kagoshima – FC Kagoshima
- Okinawa – Kaiho Bank SC
* After Miyagi prefectural qualification tournament was canceled due to 2011 Tōhoku earthquake and tsunami, Miyagi Football Association proposed that Sony Sendai represent Miyagi Prefecture since it is the most successful amateur team in the prefecture and represented the prefecture last year. Japan Football Association approved the proposal.

Prime Minister's Cup All Japan University Football Tournament winners – 1 team

- Osaka University of Health and Sport Sciences

=== Starting in the second round ===
J.League Division 1 – 18 teams

- Vegalta Sendai
- Montedio Yamagata
- Kashima Antlers
- Kashiwa Reysol
- Omiya Ardija
- Urawa Red Diamonds
- Kawasaki Frontale
- Yokohama F. Marinos
- Ventforet Kofu
- Shimizu S-Pulse
- Júbilo Iwata
- Nagoya Grampus
- Albirex Niigata
- Cerezo Osaka
- Gamba Osaka
- Vissel Kobe
- Sanfrecce Hiroshima
- Avispa Fukuoka

J.League Division 2 – 20 teams

- Consadole Sapporo
- Mito HollyHock
- Tochigi SC
- Thespa Kusatsu
- JEF United Chiba
- FC Tokyo
- Tokyo Verdy
- Yokohama FC
- Shonan Bellmare
- Kataller Toyama
- FC Gifu
- Kyoto Sanga
- Fagiano Okayama
- Gainare Tottori
- Tokushima Vortis
- Ehime FC
- Giravanz Kitakyushu
- Sagan Tosu
- Roasso Kumamoto
- Oita Trinita

Japan Football League – 2 teams

- Honda Lock
- FC Ryukyu

※Clubs that occupied two top places at the end of the 17th round (11th week) of 2011 Japan Football League.

== Matches ==
All matches are Japan Standard Time (UTC+09:00)

== First round ==
Due to Tropical Storm Talas (Japanese: 台風12号, 2011 Japanese Typhoon 12), four matches were postponed.

2011-09-04
13:00

Suzuka Rampole	1–0	Chukyo University
Masanori Murata 88'	Report

Suzuka Sports Garden, Suzuka
Attendance: 217
Referee: Kazuya Fujita

Note: The original schedule was 3 September 13:00 but postponed due to tropical storm.

2011-09-03
13:00

Tochigi Uva	1–0	Kashiwa Reysol U-18
Wakabayashi 48'	Report

Tochigi City Athletic Stadium, Tochigi
Attendance: 606
Referee: Hajime Hosoo

2011-09-03
13:00

Yamanashi Gakuin University High School	2–5	Machida Zelvia
Yusei Kayanuma 10'; Katsuhito Araki 90+3'	Report	Dimić 3'; Katsumata 24', 43'; Tsuda 27'; Ōta 55'

Yamanashi Chuo Bank Stadium, Kōfu
Attendance: 740
Referee: Kenta Tsukada

2011-09-14
18:00

Yonago Kita High School	1–3	Kamatamare Sanuki
Junya Kato 46'	Report	Okamoto 82', 83'; Omo 90+2'

Tottori Bank Bird Stadium, Tottori
Attendance: 558
Referee: Yosuke Takebe

Note: The original schedule was 3 September 15:00 but postponed due to tropical storm.

2011-09-04
15:00

Toyama Shinjo Club	1–0	Japan Soccer College
Tomohisa Ishikuro 75'	Report

Toyama Athletic Stadium, Toyama
Attendance: 674
Referee: Kazuo Takeda

2011-09-03
16:00

Matsumoto Yamaga	3–0	Maruoka Phoenix
Sudo 39'; Kijima 72', 82'	Report

Matsumotodaira Football Stadium, Matsumoto
Attendance: 3325
Referee: Taku Hase

2011-09-04
13:00

University of Tsukuba	2–1	Heisei International University
Shuhei Akazaki 6'; Misaki Uemura 81'	Report	Kota Ono 25'

Hitachinaka City Stadium, Hitachinaka
Attendance: 554
Referee: Takumi Shinoto

2011-09-04
13:00

Blaublitz Akita	13–0	Yamagata University School of Medicine
Miyoshi 13'; Matsuda 26', 41', 56', 73', 75'; Imai 30', 53'; Higa 45+2', 61'; Kawata 73'; Kozawa 80'; Chino 90+3'	Report

Akita Yabase Stadium, Akita City
Attendance: 473
Referee: Toshiyuki Wazumi

2011-09-04
13:00

Arterivo Wakayama	0–5	SP Kyoto
	Report	Sakurai 40', 43'; Otsuki 47'; Hirai 68'; Nakasuji 77'

Kinokawa Athletic Stadium, Kinokawa
Attendance: 354
Referee: Osamu Akasaka

2011-09-04
13:00

Arte Takasaki	2–0	YSCC Yokohama
Yamada 3'; Ito 30'	Report

Shoda Shoyu Stadium Gunma rugby field, Maebashi
Attendance: 347
Referee: Ippei Ōtomo

2011-09-03
13:00

Fukuoka University	2–0	Hoyo AC Elan Ōita
Ishizu 68', 88'	Report

Level-5 Stadium, Fukuoka
Attendance: 266
Referee: Ikkei Enomoto

2011-09-03
13:00

Fagiano Okayama Next	2–2 (a.e.t.)	Renofa Yamaguchi FC
Okazaki 45+2'; Kotera 106'	Report	Nakayama 89'; Nakamura 103'
Penalties
Kadoshima (penalty scored); Yamamoto (penalty scored); Nishihara (penalty scored); Kanemitsu (penalty scored); Sakamoto (penalty scored)	5–3	(penalty scored) Ikarino; (penalty scored) Ito; (penalty missed) Suzuki; (penalty scored) Takata

Kanko Stadium, Okayama
Attendance: 1487
Referee: Akinobu Saeki

2011-09-04
13:00

Hannan University	0–2	Sagawa Shiga
	Report	Nobuhito Takahashi 36'; 40' (o.g.)

Takatsuki City Park Sport Complex, Takatsuki
Attendance: 277
Referee: Masahiro Yamamura

2011-09-03
13:00

F.C. Kagoshima	5–0	Saga LIXIL F.C.
Taniguchi 18'; Tanoue 21'; Chaen 25'; Funakawa 29'; Maeda 44'	Report

Kagoshima Kamoike Stadium, Kagoshima
Attendance: 947
Referee: Seiwa Sato

2011-09-04
13:00

Nara Club	1–3	Sanyo Electric Sumoto S.C.
Hashigaito 89'	Report	Yuya Inagaki 8'; Koichi Ota 83'; Yusuke Inoue 90+3'

Kashihara Public Garden Nara Prefectural Stadium, Kashihara
Attendance: 467
Referee: Koji Morikawa

2011-09-04
15:00

Hiroshima University of Economics	0–5	Zweigen Kanazawa
	Report	Hirabayashi 28', 32', 90+3'; Saitou 53'; Honda 90+1'

Fukuyama Takegahana Stadium, Fukuyama
Attendance: 561
Referee: Yunosuke Kinji

Note: The original schedule was 3 September 15:00 but postponed due to tropical storm.

2011-09-03
13:00

Miyazaki Sangyo-keiei University	5–1	Kumamoto Teachers
Mitsuru Murayama 29'; 45' (o.g.); Atsuki Goryo 69'; Hattoku Shimaya 84'; Yoshitaka Fujiyama 85'	Report	Takahiro Masumura 89'

Miyazaki Ikime no Mori Ivy Stadium, Miyazaki
Attendance: 568
Referee: Akihiko Ikeuchi

2011-09-04
15:00

Kaiho Bank	0–1	V-Varen Nagasaki
	Report	Okamura 51'

Okinawa City Stadium, Okinawa
Attendance: 1076
Referee: Takao Onshi

2011-09-03
15:00

Hokkaido University of Education Iwamizawa Campus	1–1 (a.e.t.)	Osaka University of Health and Sport Sciences
Haruto Abe 19'	Report	Daiki Yamamoto 67'
Penalties
Ōnishi (penalty scored); Fujima (penalty scored); Hirose (penalty scored); Uehara (penalty scored); Uchida (penalty scored)	5–4	(penalty scored) Hamaue; (penalty missed) Sugawara; (penalty scored) Minaguchi; (penalty scored) Watanabe; (penalty scored) Ikenaga

Sapporo Atsubetsu Park Stadium, Sapporo
Attendance: 243
Referee: Masuya Ueda

2011-09-04
13:00

Grulla Morioka	0–2	Sony Sendai
	Report	Aso 47'; Morihara 82'

Morioka Park Stadium, Morioka
Attendance: 444
Referee: Keita Fujimoto

2011-09-07
14:00

Sanyo Electric Tokushima S.C.	0–4	Kōchi University
	Report	Kei Fukumoto 23', 90+2'; Ryobu Watabe 75'; Kojiro Takeuchi 82'

Naruto Otsuka Sports Park Football Stadium, Naruto
Attendance: 235
Referee: Koei Koya

Note: The original schedule was 3 September 13:00 and but postponed due to tropical storm. The original venue was Naruto Otsuka Sports Park Pocarisweat Stadium but changed as a result of the postponement.

2011-09-04
13:00

FC Gifu Second	2–1	Shizuoka Sangyo University
Motonobu Hosono 32'; Yuichi Endo 74'	Report	Yusuke Katayama 6'

Gifu Nagaragawa Stadium, Gifu
Attendance: 353
Referee: Toshito Fujita

2011-09-03
11:00

Hachinohe University	2–6	Fukushima United
Kawamura 69'; Hamamura 74'	Report	Ito 47'; Kim 55', 76', 86'; Shimizu 57'; Kuno 90+1'

Sapporo Atsubetsu Park Stadium, Sapporo
Attendance: 60
Referee: Shoichiro Mikami

2011-09-03
15:00

Dezzola Shimane	5–2 (a.e.t.)	Ehime FC Shimanami
Hirata 3', 114', 120+3'; Sorayama 29', 106'	Report	Kitamori 40'; Kashiwagi 43'

Shimane Soccer Field, Masuda
Attendance: 487
Referee: Shuhei Shimizu

== Second round ==
2011-10-12
19:00

Nagoya Grampus	6–0	Suzuka Rampole
Burzanović 14', 35'; Hashimoto 19'; Arai 42'; Tanaka 78'; Taguchi 88'	Report

Mizuho Athletic Stadium, Nagoya
Attendance: 2,280
Referee: Takuto Okabe

2011-10-10
13:00

FC Gifu	0–1	Giravanz Kitakyushu
	Report	Ikemoto 6'

Gifu Nagaragawa Stadium, Gifu
Attendance: 2,062
Referee: Eiji Kawai

2011-10-08
13:00

Kashiwa Reysol	2–0	Tochigi Uva
Masushima 4'; Leandro 59'	Report

Kashiwanoha Park Stadium, Kashiwa
Attendance: 3,110
Referee: Takuto Okabe

2011-10-08
15:00

Ventforet Kofu	2–1	Machida Zelvia
Uchiyama 6'; Paulinho 36'	Report	Suzuki 51'

Yamanashi Chuo Bank Stadium, Kōfu
Attendance: 3,421
Referee: Koichiro Fukushima

2011-10-12
19:00

Yokohama F. Marinos	3–1	Kamatamare Sanuki
Hyodo 86'; Taniguchi 88'; Oguro 90+3'	Report	Ishida 78'

Nippatsu Mitsuzawa Stadium, Yokohama
Attendance: 2,905
Referee: Nobutsugu Murakami

2011-10-08
13:00

Tochigi SC	2–1	Honda Lock
Choi 18'; Kawahara 70'	Report	Yusuke Maeda 60'

Tochigi Green Stadium, Utsunomiya
Attendance: 1,444
Referee: Hiromichi Oka

2011-10-12
19:00

Albirex Niigata	5–0	Toyama Shinjo Club
Lopes 17'; Kawamata 21', 76'; Kogure 23'; Uchida 90+4'	Report

Tohoku Electric Power Big Swan Stadium, Niigata
Attendance: 3,597
Referee: Toshimitsu Yoshida

2011-10-08
14:00

Matsumoto Yamaga	2–0	Yokohama FC
Katayama 53'; Funayama 55'	Report

Matsumotodaira Football Stadium, Matsumoto
Attendance: 11,510
Referee: Junpei Iida

2011-10-12
19:00

Kashima Antlers	2–0	University of Tsukuba
Tashiro 33'; Osako 38'	Report

Kashima Soccer Stadium, Kashima
Attendance: 3,468
Referee: Minoru Tojo

2011-10-10
16:00

Kataller Toyama	3–3 (a.e.t.)	Sagan Tosu
Asahi 45+1'; Funatsu 48'; Kurobe 83'	Report	Noda 21'; Arai 30'; Yamase 66'
Penalties
Asahi (penalty scored); Ōnishi (penalty scored); Kurobe (penalty missed); Hirano (penalty scored); Yada (penalty scored)	4–2	(penalty scored) Meta; (penalty missed) Kuniyoshi; (penalty scored) Kim; (penalty missed) Ikeda

Toyama Athletic Stadium, Toyama
Attendance: 2,298
Referee: Takumi Shinoto

2011-10-08
13:00

Montedio Yamagata	2–0	Blaublitz Akita
Shimomura 23'; Hasegawa 38'	Report

ND Soft Stadium Yamagata, Tendō
Attendance: 2,425
Referee: Minoru Tojo

2011-10-10
13:00

Kyoto Sanga	3–0	SP Kyoto
Nakamura 38'; Miyayoshi 58'; Kubo 72'	Report

Nishikyogoku Athletic Stadium, Kyoto
Attendance: 1,960
Referee: Yuki Noda

2011-10-08
15:00

Kawasaki Frontale	2–1 (a.e.t.)	Arte Takasaki
Kobayashi 61'; Tasaka 105'	Report	Doi 69'

Todoroki Athletics Stadium, Kawasaki
Attendance: 4,789
Referee: Hiroyuki Kimura

2011-10-10
13:00

Oita Trinita	1–0	Tokushima Vortis
Sakuda 2'	Report

Ōita Bank Dome, Ōita
Attendance: 3,308
Referee: Ryoichi Imamura

2011-10-10
13:00

Omiya Ardija	1–1 (a.e.t.)	Fukuoka University
Ueda 70'	Report	Tomohiro Tanaka 72'
Penalties
Mariano (penalty scored); Watanabe (penalty scored); Higashi (penalty scored); Fujimoto (penalty missed)	3–5	(penalty scored) Suzu; (penalty scored) Nagatani; (penalty scored) Tamura; (penalty scored) Okada; (penalty scored) Kuroki

Kumagaya Athletic Stadium, Kumagaya
Attendance: 1,500
Referee: Tomohiro Inoue

2011-10-08
13:00

Shonan Bellmare	2–1	Fagiano Okayama Next
Maki 53'; Sakamoto 77'	Report	Takeuchi 40'

Hiratsuka Athletics Stadium, Hiratsuka
Attendance: 1,251
Referee: Takuya Maeda

2011-10-12
19:00

Gamba Osaka	2–0	Sagawa Shiga
Kawanishi; Kim	Report

Osaka Expo '70 Stadium, Suita
Attendance: 2,932
Referee: Hiroyuki Kimura

2011-10-08
13:00

Consadole Sapporo	2–3 (a.e.t.)	Mito HollyHock
Yokono 59'; Sakaki 85'	Report	Ozawa 58'; Romero Frank 88'; Koike 118'

Sapporo Atsubetsu Park Stadium, Sapporo
Attendance: 3,523
Referee: Tomohiro Tsukada

2011-10-08
13:00

FC Tokyo	4–0	F.C. Kagoshima
Yazawa 14', 90'; Morishige 30'; Lucas 76'	Report

Ajinomoto Stadium, Chōfu
Attendance: 5,301
Referee: Akihiko Ikeuchi

2011-10-10
13:00

Vissel Kobe	8–0	Sanyo Electric Sumoto S.C.
Morioka 22', 32', 46'; Matsuoka 26'; Popó 31', 55'; Park 58'; Botti 68'	Report

Kakogawa Athletic Stadium, Kakogawa
Attendance: 2,471
Referee: Hiroyoshi Takayama

2011-10-08
15:00

Sanfrecce Hiroshima	4–2	Zweigen Kanazawa
Satō 2', 86'; Yokotake 30'; Mizumoto 45+2'	Report	Yamane 15'; Hirabayashi 23'

Coca-Cola West Hiroshima Stadium, Hiroshima
Attendance: 3,858
Referee: Yuichi Nishimura

Note: The venue of the match was originally planned to be Hiroshima Big Arch football ground 1 but changed on June 28.

2011-10-08
15:00

Ehime FC	2–0	FC Ryukyu
Ikeda 27'; Uchida 71'	Report

Ningineer Stadium, Matsuyama
Attendance: 795
Referee: Koei Koya

2011-10-12
13:00

Urawa Red Diamonds	4–1	Miyazaki Sangyo-keiei University
14' (o.g.); Mazola 18'; Hara 55'; Takasaki 76'	Report	Yoshitaka Fujiyama 10'

Saitama Stadium 2002, Saitama
Attendance: 4,849
Referee: Yoshiro Imamura

2011-10-10
13:00

Tokyo Verdy	7–1	V-Varen Nagasaki
Maranhão 22', 57'; Abe 38', 73'; Tsuchiya 55'; Kikuoka 69'; Kobayashi 71'	Report	Iwama 20'

Komazawa Stadium, Setagaya
Attendance: 2,701
Referee: Hiroyuki Ōnishi

2011-10-12
19:00

Cerezo Osaka	6–0	Hokkaido University of Education Iwamizawa Campus
24' (o.g.); Fabio Lopes 30', 78'; Sugimoto 71'; Komatsu 81'; Otake 86'	Report

Kincho Stadium, Osaka
Attendance: 2,116
Referee: Junpei Iida

2011-10-08
13:00

Thespa Kusatsu	0–1 (a.e.t.)	Fagiano Okayama
	Report	Sengoku 107'

Shoda Shoyu Stadium Gunma, Maebashi
Attendance: 1,030
Referee: Yosuke Kubota

2011-10-08
15:00

Vegalta Sendai	2–1 (a.e.t.)	Sony Sendai
Ota 74'; Muto 114'	Report	Taniike 79'

Yurtec Stadium Sendai, Sendai
Attendance: 5,714
Referee: Tetsuro Yoshida

2011-10-08
15:00

Avispa Fukuoka	3–0	Kōchi University
Nakamachi 14'; Matsuura 31'; Takahashi 64'	Report

Fukuyama Takegahana Stadium, Fukuyama
Attendance: 938
Referee: Naohito Ogawa

2011-10-08
13:00

Shimizu S-Pulse	2–0	FC Gifu Second
Takeuchi 44'; Omae 45+1'	Report

Outsourcing Stadium Nihondaira, Shizuoka City
Attendance: 3,648
Referee: Yoshiro Imamura

2011-10-10
13:00

Gainare Tottori	3–0	Roasso Kumamoto
Koné 8'; Kim 75'; Yoshino 86'	Report

Tottori Bank Bird Stadium, Tottori
Attendance: 3,125
Referee: Itaru Hirose

2011-10-12
19:00

Júbilo Iwata	3–0	Fukushima United
Arata 33', 71', 83'	Report

Yamaha Stadium, Iwata
Attendance: 2,019
Referee: Kazuhiko Matsumura

2011-10-10
13:00

JEF United Chiba	1–0	Dezzola Shimane
Fujimoto 67'	Report

Fukuda Denshi Arena, Chiba
Attendance: 3,528
Referee: Hiroshi Yamauchi

== Third round ==
2011-11-16
19:00

Nagoya Grampus	1–0	Giravanz Kitakyushu
Ogawa 57'	Report

Mizuho Athletic Stadium, Nagoya
Attendance: 2,840
Referee: Ryoichi Imamura

2011-11-16
19:00

Kashiwa Reysol	6–1	Ventforet Kofu
Jorge Wagner 10'; Kudo 26'; Kitajima 29'; Hashimoto 37'; Tanaka 67', 80'	Report	Yabu 13'

Hitachi Kashiwa Soccer Stadium, Kashiwa
Attendance: 3,950
Referee: Takuya Maeda

Note: The venue of the match was originally planned to be Kashiwanoha Park Stadium but changed due to stadium maintenance.

2011-11-16
13:00

Yokohama F. Marinos	3–0	Tochigi SC
Oguro 33', 80'; Nakamura 90+4'	Report

Nippatsu Mitsuzawa Stadium, Yokohama
Attendance: 3,951
Referee: Hajime Matsuo

2011-11-16
19:00

Albirex Niigata	0–1	Matsumoto Yamaga
	Report	Tatara 5'

Tohoku Electric Power Big Swan Stadium, Niigata
Attendance: 4,842
Referee: Takuto Okabe

2011-11-16
19:00

Kashima Antlers	2–1 (a.e.t.)	Kataller Toyama
Koroki 28'; Nozawa 101'	Report	Fukuda 42'

Kashima Soccer Stadium, Kashima
Attendance: 3,465
Referee: Toshimitsu Yoshida

2011-11-16
19:00

Montedio Yamagata	2–3	Kyoto Sanga
Hasegawa 7'; Miyazawa 9'	Report	Miyayoshi 15', 44', 48'

ND Soft Stadium Yamagata, Tendō
Attendance: 1,849
Referee: Hiroyuki Kimura

2011-11-16
19:00

Kawasaki Frontale	4–0	Oita Trinita
Kobayashi 25'; Tasaka 55'; Kusukami 77'; Yajima 84'	Report

Todoroki Athletics Stadium, Kawasaki
Attendance: 4,747
Referee: Hiroyoshi Takayama

2011-11-16
19:00

Fukuoka University	0–3 (a.e.t.)	Shonan Bellmare
	Report	Ohi 94'; Takayama 109'; Adiel 117'

NACK5 Stadium Omiya, Saitama
Attendance: 705
Referee: Akihiko Ikeuchi

2011-11-16
19:00

Gamba Osaka	2–3 (a.e.t.)	Mito HollyHock
Kim 40'; Sasaki 65'	Report	Ozawa 50'; Suzuki 76'; Koike 99'

Osaka Expo '70 Stadium, Suita
Attendance: 2,938
Referee: Yosuke Kubota

2011-11-16
19:00

FC Tokyo	2–1 (a.e.t.)	Vissel Kobe
Takahashi 13'; Morishige 120+1'	Report	Komoto 37'

Ajinomoto Stadium, Chōfu
Attendance: 5,937
Referee: Kenji Ogiya

2011-11-16
19:00

Sanfrecce Hiroshima	0–1	Ehime FC
	Report	Ishii 86'

Hiroshima Big Arch, Hiroshima
Attendance: 3,171
Referee: Tetsuro Yoshida

2011-11-16
19:00

Urawa Red Diamonds	2–1	Tokyo Verdy
Hara 56', 86'	Report	Apodi 64'

Saitama Stadium 2002, Saitama
Attendance: 7,427
Referee: Nobutsugu Murakami

2011-11-16
19:00

Cerezo Osaka	3–0	Fagiano Okayama
Bando 52', 90+3'; Sugimoto 90+2'	Report

Kincho Stadium, Osaka
Attendance: 3,631
Referee: Hiroyuki Ōnishi

2011-11-16
19:00

Vegalta Sendai	3–1	Avispa Fukuoka
Tamura 18', 22'; Nakashima 82'	Report	Okamoto 68'

Yurtec Stadium Sendai, Sendai
Attendance: 4,831
Referee: Tomohiro Inoue

2011-11-16
19:00

Shimizu S-Pulse	5–0	Gainare Tottori
Iwashita 27'; Takahara 45+3'; Sugiyama 70'; Nagai 79'; Yamamoto 81'	Report

Outsourcing Stadium Nihondaira, Shizuoka City
Attendance: 3,618
Referee: Hiromichi Oka

2011-11-16
19:00

Júbilo Iwata	0–1	JEF United Chiba
	Report	Yonekura 67'

Yamaha Stadium, Iwata
Attendance: 2,548
Referee: Koichiro Fukushima

== Fourth round ==
2011-12-21
19:00

Nagoya Grampus	3–3 (a.e.t.)	Kashiwa Reysol
Nagai 77', 96'; Masukawa 88'	Report	Leandro Domingues 42', 115'; Kudo 66'
Penalties
Fujimoto (penalty scored); Alex (penalty scored); Yoshimura (penalty scored); Kanazaki (penalty scored); K. Hashimoto (penalty scored); Nagai (penalty missed); Masukawa (penalty scored); Chiyotanda (penalty scored); Narazaki (penalty scored); Córdoba (penalty scored)	9–8	(penalty scored) Leandro Domingues; (penalty scored) Sawa; (penalty scored) Otani; (penalty scored) Kondo; (penalty scored) Mizuno; (penalty missed) Kudo; (penalty scored) W. Hashimoto; (penalty scored) Masushima; (penalty scored) Kitajima; (penalty missed) Sugeno

Mizuho Athletic Stadium, Nagoya
Attendance: 5,618
Referee: Hiroyoshi Takayama

Note: The original schedule was December 17 13:00 but changed due to Reysol's participation in 2011 FIFA Club World Cup.

2011-12-17
13:00

Yokohama F. Marinos	4–0	Matsumoto Yamaga
Ono 28', 73', 75'; Nakamura 87'	Report

Toyama Athletic Stadium, Toyama
Attendance: 10,120
Referee: Yudai Yamamoto

2011-12-17
13:00

Kashima Antlers	0–1	Kyoto Sanga
	Report	Miyayoshi 59'

Kagawa Marugame Stadium, Marugame
Attendance: 5,671
Referee: Itaru Hirose

2011-12-17
17:00

Kawasaki Frontale	0–1	Shonan Bellmare
	Report	Takayama 63'

Todoroki Athletics Stadium, Kawasaki
Attendance: 8,291
Referee: Hajime Matsuo

2011-12-17
13:00

Mito HollyHock	0–1	FC Tokyo
	Report	Shiotani 8' (o.g.)

K's denki Stadium Mito, Mito
Attendance: 6,242
Referee: Yoshiro Imamura

2011-12-17
15:00

Ehime FC	1–3	Urawa Red Diamonds
Fukuda 90+4'	Report	Márcio Richardes 9'; Hara 38'; Kashiwagi 77'

Kumagaya Athletic Stadium, Kumagaya
Attendance: 9,234
Referee: Minoru Tōjō

2011-12-17
17:00

Cerezo Osaka	1–1 (a.e.t.)	Vegalta Sendai
Murata 115'	Report	Muto 98'
Penalties
Kiyotake (penalty scored); Kim (penalty scored); Maruhashi (penalty scored); Ogihara (penalty scored)	4–2	(penalty scored) Kamata; (penalty missed) Akamine; (penalty missed) Muto; (penalty scored) Matsushita

Kincho Stadium, Osaka
Attendance: 5,316
Referee: Junpei Iida

2011-12-17
15:00

Shimizu S-Pulse	2–0	JEF United Chiba
Brosque 49'; Ito 62'	Report

Outsourcing Stadium Nihondaira, Shizuoka City
Attendance: 6,855
Referee: Hiroyuki Kimura

== Quarter-finals ==
2011-12-24
13:00

Nagoya Grampus	0–0 (a.e.t.)	Yokohama F. Marinos
	Report
Penalties
Fujimoto (penalty scored); Isomura (penalty scored); Ogawa (penalty scored); Yoshimura (penalty missed); Córdoba (penalty missed)	3–4	(penalty scored) Nakamura; (penalty scored) Kurihara; (penalty scored) Kobayashi; (penalty scored) Kanai

Mizuho Athletic Stadium, Nagoya
Attendance: 8,728
Referee: Junpei Iida

2011-12-24
15:00

Kyoto Sanga	1–0	Shonan Bellmare
Dutra 40'	Report

Todoroki Athletics Stadium, Kawasaki
Attendance: 4,251
Referee: Minoru Tōjō

2011-12-24
13:00

FC Tokyo	1–0	Urawa Red Diamonds
Ishikawa 20'	Report

Kumagaya Athletic Stadium, Kumagaya
Attendance: 11,612
Referee: Kenji Ogiya

2011-12-24
13:00

Cerezo Osaka	2–2 (a.e.t.)	Shimizu S-Pulse
Kim Bo-Kyung 11'; Kiyotake 93'	Report	Ono 23'; Takagi 103'
Penalties
Kiyotake (penalty scored); Kim Bo-Kyung (penalty scored); Kuaata (penalty scored); Maruhashi (penalty scored); Bando (penalty missed); Yamaguchi (penalty scored); Komatsu (penalty scored)	6–5	(penalty scored) Omae; (penalty scored) Brosque; (penalty scored) Ito; (penalty missed) Iwashita; (penalty scored) Bosnar; (penalty scored) Takagi; (penalty missed) Yamamoto

Nagai Stadium, Osaka
Attendance: 8,252
Referee: Hajime Matsuo

== Semi-finals ==
2011-12-29
15:00

Yokohama F. Marinos	2–4 (a.e.t.)	Kyoto Sanga
Watanabe 42'; Nakazawa 90+5'	Report	Kudo 50'; Dutra 72'; Kubo 116'; Komai 120'

National Olympic Stadium, Shinjuku
Attendance: 14,467
Referee: Ryuji Sato

2011-12-29
13:00

FC Tokyo	1–0	Cerezo Osaka
Yazawa 77'	Report

Nagai Stadium, Osaka
Attendance: 11,982
Referee: Masaaki Toma

== Final ==
2012-01-01
14:00

Kyoto Sanga	2–4	FC Tokyo
Nakayama 13'; Kubo 71'	Report	Konno 15'; Morishige 36'; Lucas 42', 66'

National Olympic Stadium, Shinjuku
Attendance: 41,974
Referee: Yuichi Nishimura
- First final to feature two second-tier teams and first to feature such team since 1994 final.
- Third time a second-tier champion wins the final since 1981 and 1982 finals.
- Nakayama's goal was the first to be scored in the year 2012.
