= 2011 Nagoya Grampus season =

Nagoya Grampus
2011 season
- Chairman: Toyo Kato
- Manager: Dragan Stojković
- J.League Division 1: 2nd
- Emperor's Cup: Quarterfinals vs Yokohama F·Marinos
- J.League Cup: Semi-Final vs Kashima Antlers
- AFC Champions League: Last 16 vs Suwon Samsung Bluewings
- Top goalscorer: League: Joshua Kennedy (19); All: Joshua Kennedy (19)
- Highest home attendance: 25,515 vs Urawa Red Diamonds; 25 June 2011
- Lowest home attendance: 6,793 vs Albirex Niigata; 15 June 2011
- Average home league attendance: 16,741
Home colours	Away colours

The 2011 Nagoya Grampus season was Nagoya Grampus's 19th season in the J.League Division 1 and 30th overall in the Japanese top flight. They were the defending J.League champions. It also includes the 2011 J.League Cup, 2011 Emperor's Cup, and the 2011 AFC Champions League.

== Players ==
=== Current squad ===
As of July 19, 2010 Note: Flags indicate national team as defined under FIFA eligibility rules; some limited exceptions apply. Players may hold more than one non-FIFA nationality.

No.	Pos.	Nation	Player
1	GK	JPN	Seigo Narazaki
3	DF	JPN	Mitsuru Chiyotanda
4	DF	JPN	Tulio
5	DF	JPN	Takahiro Masukawa
6	DF	JPN	Shohei Abe
7	MF	JPN	Naoshi Nakamura
8	MF	JPN	Jungo Fujimoto
9	MF	MNE	Igor Burzanović
10	MF	JPN	Yoshizumi Ogawa
11	FW	JPN	Keiji Tamada
14	MF	JPN	Keiji Yoshimura
16	FW	AUS	Joshua Kennedy
18	FW	JPN	Kensuke Nagai
20	MF	COL	Danilson Córdoba
21	GK	JPN	Koji Nishimura

No.	Pos.	Nation	Player
22	MF	JPN	Koji Hashimoto
23	DF	JPN	Genta Matsuo
25	MF	JPN	Mu Kanazaki
26	DF	JPN	Tatsuya Arai
27	MF	JPN	Sho Hanai
28	MF	JPN	Taishi Taguchi
29	FW	JPN	Hikaru Kuba
31	GK	JPN	Toru Hasegawa
32	DF	JPN	Hayuma Tanaka
33	MF	JPN	Ryota Isomura
34	MF	JPN	Makito Yoshida
35	MF	JPN	Teruki Tanaka
38	MF	JPN	Alessandro Santos
50	GK	JPN	Yoshinari Takagi

=== Out on loan ===
Note: Flags indicate national team as defined under FIFA eligibility rules; some limited exceptions apply. Players may hold more than one non-FIFA nationality.

No.	Pos.	Nation	Player
—	DF	JPN	Akira Takeuchi (to JEF United Chiba)
—	MF	JPN	Yoshiki Hiraki (to Shonan Bellmare)
—	FW	JPN	Yuki Maki (to Shonan Bellmare)
—	FW	JPN	Tomohiro Tsuda (to Tokushima Vortis)

=== 2011 season transfers ===
In: Note: Flags indicate national team as defined under FIFA eligibility rules; some limited exceptions apply. Players may hold more than one non-FIFA nationality.

No.	Pos.	Nation	Player
8	MF	JPN	Jungo Fujimoto (Transferred from Shimizu S-Pulse)
18	FW	JPN	Kensuke Nagai (Drafted from Fukuoka University)
34	MF	JPN	Makito Yoshida (Drafted from Ryutsu Keizai University Kashiwa High School)
35	MF	JPN	Teruki Tanaka (Drafted from Mitsubishi Yowa Youth)
—	DF	JPN	Masaya Sato (Loan return from Thespa Kusatsu)
—	MF	JPN	Yoshiki Hiraki (Loan return from Roasso Kumamoto)

Out: Note: Flags indicate national team as defined under FIFA eligibility rules; some limited exceptions apply. Players may hold more than one non-FIFA nationality.

No.	Pos.	Nation	Player
2	DF	JPN	Akira Takeuchi (Loan to JEF United Chiba)
8	MF	BRA	Magnum (to (South Korea) Ulsan Hyundai)
17	FW	JPN	Yuki Maki (Loan to Shonan Bellmare)
19	FW	JPN	Keita Sugimoto (Transferred to Tokushima Vortis)
24	MF	JPN	Shinta Fukushima (Transferred to Tokushima Vortis)
—	DF	JPN	Masaya Sato (Transferred to F.C. Ryukyu)
—	MF	JPN	Yoshiki Hiraki (Loan to Shonan Bellmare)

== Competitions ==
=== J.League ===
==== Results summary ====
Overall								Home						Away					
Pld	W	D	L	GF	GA	GD	Pts	W	D	L	GF	GA	GD	W	D	L	GF	GA	GD
34	21	8	5	67	36	+31	71	11	5	1	40	16	+24	10	3	4	27	20	+7

Last updated: 29 November 2011.
Source: World-Football.net

==== Results by round ====
Round	1	2	3	4	5	6	7	8	9	10	11	12	13	14	15	16	17	18	19	20	21	22	23	24	25	26	27	28	29	30	31	32	33	34
Ground	H	A	H	H	A	H	H	A	H	H	A	H	A	A	H	A	H	A	H	A	A	H	A	H	A	A	H	A	H	A	H	A	H	A
Result	D	L	W	D	L	D	W	W	W	D	W	D	D	W	W	W	W	W	W	W	D	L	W	W	L	D	W	L	W	W	W	W	W	W
Position	9	17	10	11	12	12	11	10	7	7	6	7	8	7	4	3	3	3	3	1	1	3	2	2	4	4	2	3	3	3	3	2	2	2

Source: "World-Football.net".
A = Away; H = Home; W = Win; D = Draw; L = Loss

==== Results ====
5 March 2011 Round 1	Nagoya Grampus	1–1	Yokohama F. Marinos	Toyota Stadium
Saturday 14:00	Kennedy 90+5'	Report	63' Hyodo	Attendance: 27,153; Referee: Minoru Tojo

24 April 2011 Round 2	Urawa Red Diamonds	3–0	Nagoya Grampus	Saitama Stadium 2002
Sunday 16:00	Márcio Richardes 12'; Tanaka 25'; Haraguchi 78'	Summary		Attendance: 42.767; Referee: Nobutsugu Murakami

29 April 2011 Round 3	Nagoya Grampus	2–0	Kawasaki Frontale	Mizuho Athletic Stadium
Friday 19:00	Tamada 33', 82'	Summary		Attendance: 14,556; Referee: Ryuji Sato

7 May 2011 Round 4	Nagoya Grampus	1–1	Shimizu S-Pulse	Mizuho Athletic Stadium
Saturday 15:00	Tamada 8'	Summary	Brosque 18'	Attendance: 11,559; Referee: Itaru Hirose

15 May 2011 Round 5	Ventforet Kofu	3–1	Nagoya Grampus	Yamanashibank Stadium
Sunday 13:00	Abe 28'; Havenaar 71'; Matsuhashi 78'	Summary	Fujimoto 39'	Attendance: 14,075; Referee: Jumpei Iida

21 May 2011 Round 6	Nagoya Grampus	0–0	Kashiwa Reysol	Toyota Stadium
Saturday 16:00		Summary		Attendance: 21,506; Referee: Minoru Tojo

29 May 2011 Round 7	Nagoya Grampus	5–2	Avispa Fukuoka	Toyota Stadium
Sunday 16:00	Kennedy 23'; Tamada 51', 90+2'; Fujimoto 81'; Burzanović	Summary	Okamoto 26' (pen.); Shigematsu 66'	Attendance: 11,132; Referee: Joji Kashihara

11 June 2011 Round 8	Júbilo Iwata	0–1	Nagoya Grampus	Yamaha Stadium
Saturday 14:00		Summary	Tamada 89'	Attendance: 12,067; Referee: Hiroyoshi Takayama

15 June 2011 Round 9	Nagoya Grampus	4–0	Albirex Niigata	Mizuho Athletic Stadium
Wednesday 19:00	Tamada 28'; Kennedy 37', 83'; Tanaka 90+3'	Summary		Attendance: 6,793; Referee: Yuichi Nishimura

18 June 2011 Round 10	Nagoya Grampus	2–2	Omiya Ardija	Mizuho Athletic Stadium
Saturday 19:00	Isomura 45+1'; Kennedy 52' (pen.)	Summary	Aoki 67', 90+3'	Attendance: 8,345; Referee: Hajime Matsuo

22 June 2011 Round 11	Cerezo Osaka	2–3	Nagoya Grampus	Kincho Stadium
Wednesday 19:00	Pimpao 14'; Inui 90+1'	Summary	Isomura 14'; Tamada 45'; Kennedy 73'	Attendance: 7,875; Referee: Nobutsugu Murakami

25 June 2011 Round 12	Nagoya Grampus	1–1	Urawa Red Diamonds	Toyota Stadium
Saturday 19:00	Isomura 45+1'	Summary	Mazola 90+9'	Attendance: 28,515; Referee: Kenji Ogiya

2 July 2011 Round 13	Vegalta Sendai	1–1	Nagoya Grampus	Yurtec Stadium Sendai
Saturday 16:00	Yong-Gi 44'	Summary	Kakuda 44' (o.g.)	Attendance: 18,533; Referee: Hiroyoshi Takayama

9 July 2011 Round 14	Vissel Kobe	0–1	Nagoya Grampus	Home's Stadium Kobe
Saturday 14:00		Summary	Nakamura 84'	Attendance: 17,568; Referee: Minoru Tojo

13 July 2011 Round 15	Nagoya Grampus	2–1	Kashima Antlers	Toyota Stadium
Saturday 13:00	Kennedy 35'; Burzanović 79'	Summary	Osako 2'	Attendance: 12,845; Referee: Toshimitsu Yoshida

17 July 2011 Round 16	Montedio Yamagata	0–2	Nagoya Grampus	ND Soft Stadium
Sunday 13:00		Summary	Tamada 43'; Kennedy 57'	Attendance: 11,757; Referee: Itaru Hirose

23 July 2011 Round 17	Nagoya Grampus	3–2	Sanfrecce Hiroshima	Mizuho Athletic Stadium
Saturday 15:30	Tulio 15'; Morita 67' (o.g.); Masukawa 80'	Summary	Lee 6'; Aoyama 86'	Attendance: 11,904; Referee: Yoshiro Imamura

31 July 2011 Round 18	Avispa Fukuoka	0–3	Nagoya Grampus	Level-5 Stadium
Sunday 19:00		Summary	Tamada 51'; Fujimoto 73'; Kennedy 90' (pen.)	Attendance: 19,421; Referee: Ryuji Sato

7 August 2011 Round 19	Nagoya Grampus	2–1	Júbilo Iwata	Mizuho Athletic Stadium
Sunday 19:00	Ogawa 28'; Nagai 73'	Summary	Kanazono 19'	Attendance: 14,230; Referee: Jumpei Iida

13 August 2011 Round 20	Sanfrecce Hiroshima	0–3	Nagoya Grampus	Hiroshima Big Arch
Saturday		Summary	Ogawa 23'; Kennedy 39'; Nagai 90+4'	Attendance: 7,099; Referee: Nobutsugu Murakami

17 August 2011 Round 21	Gamba Osaka	2–2	Nagoya Grampus	Osaka Expo '70 Stadium
Wednesday 19:00	Rafinha 45'; Kim Seung-Yong 74'	Summary	Burzanović 56'; Kennedy 86'	Attendance: 15951; Referee: Hajime Matsuo

20 August 2011 Round 22	Nagoya Grampus	0–1	Vegalta Sendai	Mizuho Athletic Stadium
Saturday 19:00		Summary	Sugai 17'	Attendance: 13,365; Referee: Toshimitsu Yoshida

24 August 2011 Round 23	Kawasaki Frontale	1–2	Nagoya Grampus	Todoroki Athletics Stadium
Wednesday 19:00	Kusukami 66'; Tanaka (yellow card) 17' (yellow-red card) 75'	Summary	Kennedy 76' (pen.), 78'	Attendance: 19,754; Referee: Kenji Ogiya

28 August 2011 Round 24	Nagoya Grampus	4–1	Ventforet Kofu	Toyota Stadium
Sunday 19:00	Tamada 32'; Kennedy 34'; Fujimoto 45', 69'	Summary	Havenaar 9'; Daniel (red card) 45+2'	Attendance: 19,061; Referee: Tomohiro Inoue

10 September 2011 Round 25	Kashiwa Reysol	2–1	Nagoya Grampus	Kashiwa Stadium
Saturday	Tanaka 65'; Sawa 71'	Summary	Tamada 18'	Attendance: 10,914; Referee: Yudai Yamamoto

18 September 2011 Round 26	Kashima Antlers	1–1	Nagoya Grampus	Kashima Soccer Stadium
Sunday	Masuda 77'	Summary	Tulio 82'	Attendance: 22,258; Referee: Yuichi Nishimura

23 September 2011 Round 27	Nagoya Grampus	3–1	Vissel Kobe	Mizuho Athletic Stadium
Friday	Tulio 10'; Fujimoto 61'; Kennedy 86'	Summary	Park Kang-Jo 4'	Attendance: 15,987; Referee: Itaru Hirose

2 October 2011 Round 28	Shimizu S-Pulse	2–0	Nagoya Grampus	Outsourcing Stadium
Sunday	Omae 84'; Brosque 84'	Summary		Attendance: 20,181; Referee: Hajime Matsuo

15 October 2011 Round 29	Nagoya Grampus	4–1	Gamba Osaka	Mizuho Athletic Stadium
Saturday	Nakamura 12', 69'; Fujimoto 49', 85'	Summary	Myojin 26'	Attendance: 17,481; Referee: Toshimitsu Yoshida

22 October 2011 Round 30	Omiya Ardija	2–3	Nagoya Grampus	NACK5 Stadium
Saturday	Higashi 65'; Rafael 67'	Summary	Tulio 3'; Tamada 77'; Kennedy 83' (pen.)	Attendance: 9,200; Referee: Masaaki Iemoto

29 October 2011 Round 31	Nagoya Grampus	3–1	Cerezo Osaka	Toyota Stadium
Saturday	Fujimoto 25'; Kennedy 42'; Nagai 77'	Summary	Komatsu 37' (pen.)	Attendance: 23,677; Referee: Kazuhiko Matsumura

19 November 2011 Round 32	Yokohama F. Marinos	1–2	Nagoya Grampus	Nissan Stadium
Saturday	Nakamura 71'	Summary	Ogawa 13'; Kennedy 83'	Attendance: 23,023; Referee: Yuichi Nishimura

26 November 2011 Round 33	Nagoya Grampus	3–0	Montedio Yamagata	Toyota Stadium
Saturday	Kennedy 8'; Tulio 39', 45'	Summary		Attendance: 26,481; Referee: Kenji Ogiya

3 December 2011 Round 34	Albirex Niigata	0–1	Nagoya Grampus	Niigata Stadium
Saturday	Michael (yellow card) 15' (yellow-red card) 86'	Summary	Tamada 54'	Attendance: 26,300; Referee: Minoru Tojo

==== League table ====
Pos	Team	Pld	W	D	L	GF	GA	GD	Pts	Qualification or relegation
1	Kashiwa Reysol (C)	34	23	3	8	65	42	+23	72	Qualification for 2012 AFC Champions League group stage (Note: League champions also qualified for the 2011 FIFA Club World Cup play-off stage.; The winners of the 2011 Emperor's Cup, FC Tokyo, which played in the 2011 J.League Division 2, also qualified for the group stage of the 2012 AFC Champions League.)
2	Nagoya Grampus	34	21	8	5	67	36	+31	71	Qualification for 2012 AFC Champions League group stage
3	Gamba Osaka	34	21	7	6	78	51	+27	70	Qualification for 2012 AFC Champions League group stage
4	Vegalta Sendai	34	14	14	6	39	25	+14	56	
5	Yokohama F. Marinos	34	16	8	10	46	40	+6	56	

Updated to match(es) played on December 3, 2011. Source: J.League Division 1
Rules for classification: 1st points; 2nd goal differential; 3rd goals scored; 4th head-to-head results; 5th disciplinary points; 6th draw. If two clubs are tied for first place, both clubs will be declared.
(C) Champions

=== Super Cup ===
26 February 2011	Nagoya Grampus	1–1 (3–1 p)	Kashima Antlers	Nissan Stadium
Saturday 13:37	Masukawa 54'	Report	66' Nozawa	Attendance: 35,963; Referee: Nishimura
	Penalties
	Kennedy (penalty missed); Fujimoto (penalty scored); Santos (penalty scored); Ogawa (penalty scored)		(penalty missed) Iwamasa; (penalty scored) Motoyama; (penalty missed) Alex; (penalty missed) Araiba

=== J.League Cup ===
2011-10-05	Nagoya Grampus	5–3 (a.e.t.)	Albirex Niigata	Mizuho Athletic Stadium, Nagoya
19:00	Kanazaki 15'; Nagai 90+1', 105+2'; Hashimoto 114'; Tulio 120+1'		Bruno Lopes 63'; Kawamata 90+3'; Kikuchi 98'	Attendance: 4,108; Referee: Ryuji Sato

2011-10-09	Nagoya Grampus	1–2 (a.e.t.)	Kashima Antlers	Mizuho Athletic Stadium, Nagoya
13:00	Tulio 80'; Isomura (yellow card) 83' (yellow-red card) 115'		Osako 10'; Shibasaki 107'	Attendance: 8,562; Referee: Kenji Ogiya

=== Emperor's Cup ===
2011-10-12 Second Round	Nagoya Grampus	6–0	Suzuka Rampole	Mizuho Athletic Stadium, Nagoya
19:00	Burzanović 14', 35'; Hashimoto 19'; Arai 42'; Tanaka 78'; Taguchi 88'	Report		Attendance: 2,280

2011-11-16 Third Round	Nagoya Grampus	1–0	Giravanz Kitakyushu	Mizuho Athletic Stadium, Nagoya
19:00	Ogawa 57'	Report		Attendance: 2,840

2011-12-21^{1} Fourth Round	Nagoya Grampus	3–3 (a.e.t.) (9–8 p)	Kashiwa Reysol	Mizuho Athletic Stadium, Nagoya
	Nagai 77', 96'; Masukawa 87'; Tanaka (red card) 114'	Report; Summary	Leandro Domingues 42', 114' (pen.); Kudo 67'
	Penalties
	Fujimoto (penalty scored); Alex (penalty scored); Yoshimura (penalty scored); Kanazaki (penalty scored); K. Hashimoto (penalty scored); Nagai (penalty missed); Masukawa (penalty scored); Chiyotanda (penalty scored); Narazaki (penalty scored); Córdoba (penalty scored)		(penalty scored) Leandro Domingues; (penalty scored) Sawa; (penalty scored) Otani; (penalty scored) Kondo; (penalty scored) Mizuno; (penalty missed) Kudo; (penalty scored) W. Hashimoto; (penalty scored) Masushima; (penalty scored) Kitajima; (penalty missed) Sugeno

2011-12-24 Quarterfinals	Nagoya Grampus	0–0 (a.e.t.) (3–4 p)	Yokohama F. Marinos	Mizuho Athletic Stadium, Nagoya
13:00		Report; Summary
	Penalties
	Fujimoto (penalty scored); Isomura (penalty scored); Ogawa (penalty scored); Yoshimura (penalty missed); Córdoba (penalty missed)		(penalty scored) Nakamura; (penalty scored) Kurihara; (penalty scored) Kobayashi; (penalty scored) Kanai

Notes

- The original schedule was December 17 13:00 but changed due to Reysol's participation in 2011 FIFA Club World Cup.

=== AFC Champions League ===
==== Group stage ====
Group F
Team	Pld	W	D	L	GF	GA	GD	Pts
(South Korea) FC Seoul	6	3	2	1	9	4	+5	11
(Japan) Nagoya Grampus	6	3	1	2	9	6	+3	10
(United Arab Emirates) Al-Ain	6	2	1	3	4	9	−5	7
(China) Hangzhou Greentown	6	1	2	3	3	6	−3	5

1 March 2011 Group Stage	Hangzhou Greentown (China)	2–0	(Japan) Nagoya Grampus	Zheijiang Dragon Stadium, Hangzhou
19:35 UTC+08:00	Ramírez 60'; Bari 86'	Report		Attendance: 28,674; Referee: Abdulrahman Abdou (Qatar)

6 April 2011 Group Stage	Nagoya Grampus (Japan)	1–1	(South Korea) FC Seoul	Mizuho Athletic Stadium, Nagoya
19:00 UTC+09:00	Nagai 14'	Report	Choi Hyun-Tae 61'	Attendance: 7,348; Referee: Khalil Al Ghamdi (Saudi Arabia)

12 April 2011^{1} Group Stage	Nagoya Grampus (Japan)	4–0	(United Arab Emirates) Al-Ain	Mizuho Athletic Stadium, Nagoya
19:00 UTC+09:00	Kanazaki 27', 45+1'; Keita 61' (o.g.); Fujimoto 77'	Report		Attendance: 5,914; Referee: Subkhiddin Mohd Salleh (Malaysia)

19 April 2011 Group Stage	FC Seoul (South Korea)	0–2	(Japan) Nagoya Grampus	Seoul World Cup Stadium, Seoul
20:00 UTC+09:00		Report	Kanazaki 26'; Nagai 81'	Attendance: 10,927; Referee: Mohsen Torky (Iran)

4 May 2011 Group Stage	Nagoya Grampus (Japan)	1–0	(China) Hangzhou Greentown	Mizuho Athletic Stadium, Nagoya
14:00 UTC+09:00	Fujimoto 77' (pen.)	Report		Attendance: 13,767; Referee: Nawaf Shukralla (Bahrain)

11 May 2011 Group Stage	Al-Ain (United Arab Emirates)	3–1	(Japan) Nagoya Grampus	Tahnoun bin Mohammed Stadium, Al Ain
19:40 UTC+04:00	Al Merri 21'; Elias 39', 50' (pen.)	Report	Fujimoto 49'	Attendance: 892; Referee: Muhsen Basma (Syria)

Notes

- Note 1: Nagoya Grampus v Al-Ain postponed from 15 March 2011 to 12 April 2011 due to earthquake in Japan.

==== Round of 16 ====
25 May 2011	Suwon Samsung Bluewings (South Korea)	2–0	(Japan) Nagoya Grampus	Suwon World Cup Stadium, Suwon
19:30 UTC+09:00	Yeom Ki-Hun 23'; Lee Sang-ho 57'	Report		Attendance: 11,036; Referee: Abdulrahman Abdou (Qatar)

== Squad statistics ==
=== Appearances and goals ===
No.	Pos	Nat	Player	Total		J-League		J-League Cup		Emperor's Cup		AFC Champions League	
No.	Pos	Nat	Player	Apps	Goals	Apps	Goals	Apps	Goals	Apps	Goals	Apps	Goals
1	GK	(Japan) JPN	Seigo Narazaki	35	0	24+0	0	2+0	0	3+0	0	6+0	0
3	DF	(Japan) JPN	Mitsuru Chiyotanda	27	0	5+12	0	1+0	0	4+0	0	2+3	0
4	DF	(Japan) JPN	Tulio	38	7	31+0	6	2+0	1	0+0	0	5+0	0
5	DF	(Japan) JPN	Takahiro Masukawa	44	2	33+0	1	1+1	0	3+0	1	6+0	0
6	DF	(Japan) JPN	Shohei Abe	42	0	30+2	0	2+0	0	1+0	0	7+0	0
7	MF	(Japan) JPN	Naoshi Nakamura	36	3	23+4	3	2+0	0	2+0	0	4+1	0
8	MF	(Japan) JPN	Jungo Fujimoto	43	12	32+1	9	0+0	0	3+0	0	7+0	3
9	MF	(Montenegro) MNE	Igor Burzanović	25	5	8+14	3	2+0	0	1+0	2	0+0	0
10	MF	(Japan) JPN	Yoshizumi Ogawa	46	4	34+0	3	2+0	0	3+0	1	7+0	0
11	FW	(Japan) JPN	Keiji Tamada	39	14	32+1	14	0+0	0	2+1	0	3+0	0
14	MF	(Japan) JPN	Keiji Yoshimura	15	0	3+3	0	2+0	0	2+2	0	2+1	0
16	FW	(Australia) AUS	Joshua Kennedy	35	19	31+0	19	0+0	0	0+0	0	4+0	0
18	FW	(Japan) JPN	Kensuke Nagai	40	9	8+19	3	2+0	2	3+1	2	5+2	2
20	MF	(Colombia) COL	Danilson Córdoba	26	0	21+2	0	0+0	0	2+0	0	1+0	0
22	MF	(Japan) JPN	Koji Hashimoto	9	2	0+3	0	0+2	1	1+1	1	1+1	0
23	DF	(Japan) JPN	Genta Matsuo	2	0	0+0	0	0+0	0	0+1	0	1+0	0
25	MF	(Japan) JPN	Mu Kanazaki	22	4	3+9	0	2+0	1	3+1	0	4+0	3
26	DF	(Japan) JPN	Tatsuya Arai	2	1	0+0	0	0+0	0	1+0	1	1+0	0
27	MF	(Japan) JPN	Sho Hanai	2	0	0+1	0	0+0	0	0+0	0	0+1	0
28	MF	(Japan) JPN	Taishi Taguchi	5	1	0+3	0	0+0	0	1+1	1	0+0	0
29	FW	(Japan) JPN	Hikaru Kuba	4	0	1+1	0	0+0	0	0+0	0	0+2	0
32	DF	(Japan) JPN	Hayuma Tanaka	45	1	34+0	1	2+0	0	3+0	0	6+0	0
33	MF	(Japan) JPN	Ryota Isomura	28	3	6+14	3	0+2	0	2+0	0	1+3	0
34	MF	(Japan) JPN	Makito Yoshida	12	0	1+4	0	0+0	0	0+2	0	3+2	0
35	MF	(Japan) JPN	Teruki Tanaka	4	1	0+1	0	0+0	0	0+1	1	0+2	0
38	MF	(Japan) JPN	Alessandro Santos	19	0	4+7	0	0+1	0	3+1	0	0+3	0
50	GK	(Japan) JPN	Yoshinari Takagi	13	0	10+1	0	0+0	0	1+0	0	1+0	0
Players who appeared for Nagoya Grampus that left during the season:

=== Goal Scorers ===
Place	Position	Nation	Number	Name	J-League	J-League Cup	Emperor's Cup	AFC Champions League	Super Cup	Total
1	FW	(Australia)	16	Joshua Kennedy	19	0	0	0	0	19
2	MF	(Japan)	11	Keiji Tamada	14	0	0	0	0	14
3	MF	(Japan)	8	Jungo Fujimoto	9	0	0	3	0	12
4	FW	(Japan)	18	Kensuke Nagai	3	2	2	2	0	9
5	DF	(Japan)	4	Marcus Tulio Tanaka	6	2	0	0	0	8
6	MF	(Montenegro)	9	Igor Burzanović	3	0	2	0	0	5
7	MF	(Japan)	25	Mu Kanazaki	0	1	0	3	0	4
7	MF	(Japan)	10	Yoshizumi Ogawa	3	0	1	0	0	4
9	MF	(Japan)	7	Naoshi Nakamura	3	0	0	0	0	3
9	MF	(Japan)	33	Ryota Isomura	3	0	0	0	0	3
9				Own goal	2	0	0	1	0	3
9	DF	(Japan)	5	Takahiro Masukawa	1	0	1	0	1	3
13	MF	(Japan)	22	Koji Hashimoto	0	1	1	0	0	2
14	MF	(Japan)	32	Hayuma Tanaka	1	0	0	0	0	1
14	MF	(Japan)	35	Teruki Tanaka	0	0	1	0	0	1
14	DF	(Japan)	26	Tatsuya Arai	0	0	1	0	0	1
14	MF	(Japan)	28	Taishi Taguchi	0	0	1	0	0	1
				TOTALS	67	6	10	9	1	93

updated to 21/12/11

=== Disciplinary record ===
Number	Nation	Position	Name	J-League		J.League Cup		Emperor's Cup		AFC Champions League		Super Cup		Total	
Number	Nation	Position	Name	Yellow card	Red card	Yellow card	Red card	Yellow card	Red card	Yellow card	Red card	Yellow card	Red card	Yellow card	Red card
1	(Japan)	GK	Seigo Narazaki	0	0	0	0	0	0	1	0	0	0	1	0
3	(Japan)	DF	Mitsuru Chiyotanda	2	0	1	0	1	0	0	0	0	0	4	0
4	(Japan)	DF	Marcus Tulio Tanaka	5	0	0	0	0	1	0	0	0	0	6	0
5	(Japan)	DF	Takahiro Masukawa	3	0	1	0	0	0	0	0	0	0	4	0
6	(Japan)	DF	Shohei Abe	3	0	0	0	0	0	1	0	0	0	4	0
7	(Japan)	MF	Naoshi Nakamura	5	0	0	0	1	0	0	0	1	0	7	0
8	(Japan)	MF	Jungo Fujimoto	7	0	0	0	0	0	1	0	0	0	8	0
9	(Montenegro)	MF	Igor Burzanović	3	0	0	0	0	0	0	0	0	0	3	0
10	(Japan)	MF	Yoshizumi Ogawa	3	0	1	0	2	0	1	0	0	0	7	0
14	(Japan)	MF	Keiji Yoshimura	1	0	1	0	0	0	0	0	0	0	2	0
16	(Australia)	FW	Joshua Kennedy	1	0	0	0	0	0	0	0	0	0	1	0
18	(Japan)	FW	Kensuke Nagai	2	0	0	0	0	0	1	0	0	0	3	0
20	(Colombia)	MF	Danilson Córdoba	9	0	0	0	1	0	0	0	0	0	10	0
22	(Japan)	MF	Koji Hashimoto	0	0	1	0	0	0	0	0	0	0	1	0
25	(Japan)	MF	Mu Kanazaki	1	0	0	0	0	0	1	0	1	0	3	0
32	(Japan)	DF	Hayuma Tanaka	3	0	1	0	2	1	0	0	0	0	6	1
33	(Japan)	MF	Ryota Isomura	2	0	2	1	0	0	0	0	0	0	4	1
34	(Japan)	MF	Makito Yoshida	0	0	0	0	0	0	1	0	0	0	1	0
38	(Japan)	MF	Alessandro Santos	1	0	1	0	0	0	0	0	0	0	2	0
50	(Japan)	GK	Yoshinari Takagi	2	0	0	0	0	0	0	0	0	0	2	0
			TOTALS	53	0	9	1	7	1	8	0	2	0	79	2

== Team kit ==
These are the 2011 Nagoya Grampus kits.

Supplier: Le Coq Sportif
Sponsor(s): Toyota

Home Kit	Away Kit
