= 2011 Japanese Super Cup =

Match

| Nagoya Grampus | Kashima Antlers |
| 1 | 1 |
- Nagoya Grampus won 3–1 on penalties
- Date: 26 February 2011
- Venue: Nissan Stadium, Yokohama
- Referee: Yuichi Nishimura
- Attendance: 35,963

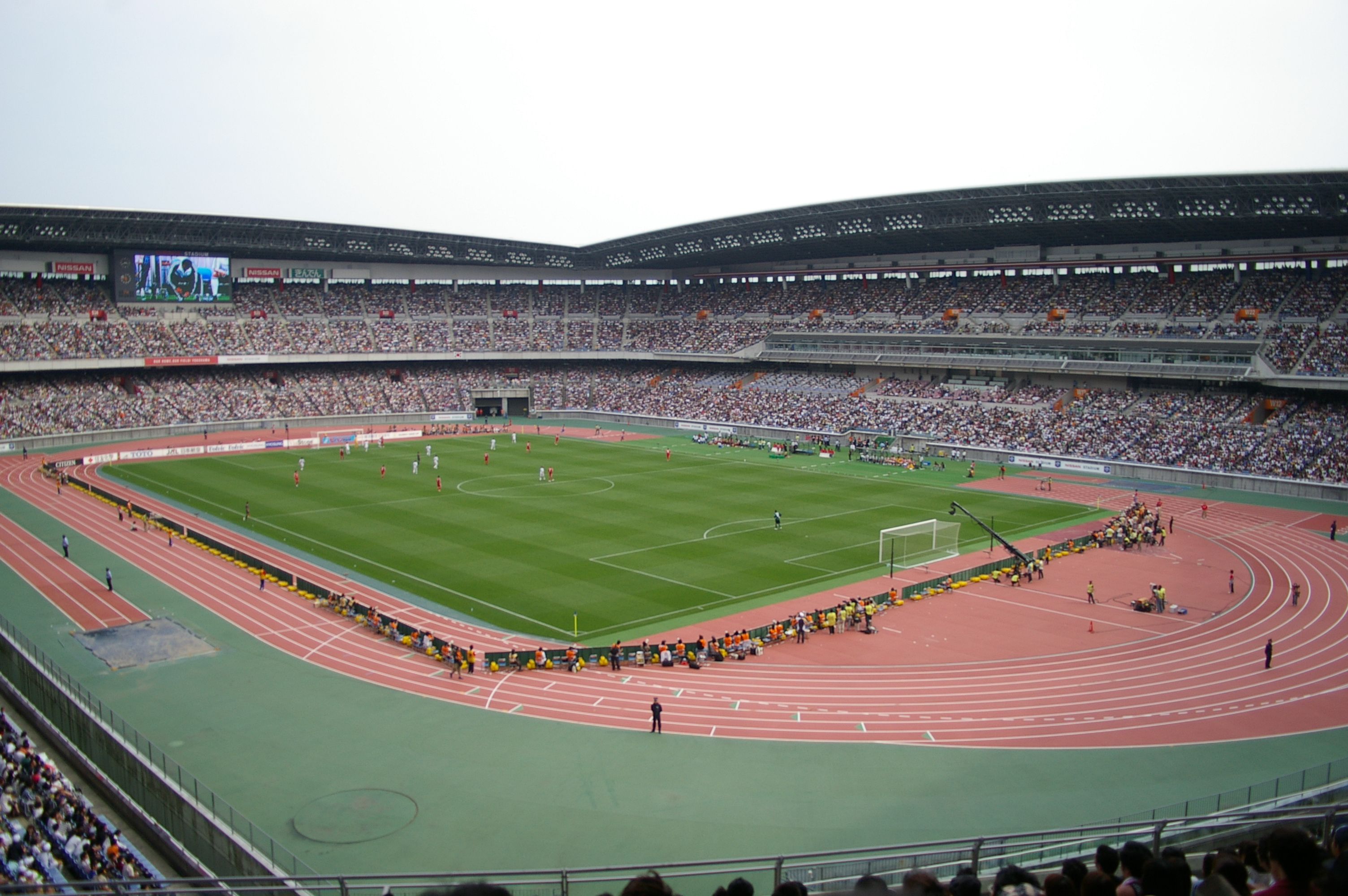
Takeaction footballgame by Nakata Hidetoshi produce at Nissan stadium.

The 2011 Japanese Super Cup was held on 26 February 2011 between the 2010 J.League champions Nagoya Grampus and the 2010 Emperor's Cup winner Kashima Antlers. The match was drawn at the end of regulation time and Nagoya Grampus went on to win the match 3–1 in penalties.

== Match details ==
26 February 2011
13:37 JST

| Nagoya Grampus | 1–1 | Kashima Antlers |
|---|---|---|
| Masukawa 54' | Report | 66' Nozawa |
Penalties
| Kennedy (penalty missed); Fujimoto (penalty scored); Santos (penalty scored); Ogawa (penalty scored) | 3–1 | (penalty missed) Iwamasa; (penalty scored) Motoyama; (penalty missed) Alex; (penalty missed) Araiba |

Nissan Stadium
Attendance: 35,963
Referee: (Japan) Yuichi Nishimura

NAGOYA GRAMPUS (4–3–3):
| GK | 1 | (Japan) Seigo Narazaki |
| RB | 32 | (Japan) Hayuma Tanaka |
| CB | 4 | (Japan) Marcus Tulio Tanaka |
| CB | 5 | (Japan) Takahiro Masukawa |
| LB | 6 | (Japan) Shohei Abe |
| CM | 7 | (Japan) Naoshi Nakamura | (yellow card) 61' | (substituted off) 79' |
| CM | 10 | (Japan) Yoshizumi Ogawa |
| AM | 8 | (Japan) Jungo Fujimoto |
| RW | 25 | (Japan) Mu Kanazaki | (yellow card) 35' | (substituted off) 71' |
| LW | 11 | (Japan) Keiji Tamada | | (substituted off) 88' |
| CF | 16 | (Australia) Joshua Kennedy |
Substitutes:
| GK | 50 | (Japan) Yoshinari Takagi |
| DF | 3 | (Japan) Mitsuru Chiyotanda |
| DF | 38 | (Japan) Alessandro Santos | | (substituted on) 79' |
| MF | 14 | (Japan) Keiji Yoshimura | | (substituted on) 71' |
| MF | 27 | (Japan) Sho Hanai | | (substituted on) 88' |
| MF | 33 | (Japan) Ryota Isomura |
| FW | 22 | (Japan) Koji Hashimoto |
Manager:
(Serbia) Dragan Stojković

KASHIMA ANTLERS (4–4–2):
| GK | 21 | (Japan) Hitoshi Sogahata |
| RB | 7 | (Japan) Toru Araiba |
| CB | 3 | (Japan) Daiki Iwamasa |
| CB | 19 | (Japan) Masahiko Inoha |
| LB | 5 | (Brazil) Alex | (yellow card) 22' |
| CM | 15 | (Japan) Takeshi Aoki |
| CM | 40 | (Japan) Mitsuo Ogasawara | | (substituted off) 74' |
| RM | 8 | (Japan) Takuya Nozawa |
| LM | 11 | (Brazil) Fellype Gabriel | | (substituted off) 89' |
| CF | 9 | (Japan) Yuya Osako | | (substituted off) 81' |
| CF | 13 | (Japan) Shinzo Koroki |
Substitutes:
| GK | 1 | (Japan) Tetsu Sugiyama |
| MF | 6 | (Japan) Kōji Nakata | | (substituted on) 74' |
| MF | 10 | (Japan) Masashi Motoyama | | (substituted on) 89' |
| MF | 14 | (Japan) Chikashi Masuda |
| MF | 25 | (Japan) Yasushi Endo |
| FW | 18 | (Brazil) Carlão | | (substituted on) 81' |
| FW | 30 | (Japan) Yuzo Tashiro |
Manager:
(Brazil) Oswaldo de Oliveira

== See also ==
- 2010 J.League Division 1
- 2010 Emperor's Cup
