= Makito =

- Gender: Male

Origin
- Origin: Japanese
- Meaning: Different meanings depending on the kanji used

Makito (written: 槙人 or 眞紀人) is a masculine Japanese given name. Notable people with the name include:

- Makito Ito (伊藤 槙人; born 1992), Japanese footballer
- Makito Yoshida (吉田 眞紀人; born 1992), Japanese footballer
