= Yushi Hasegawa =

Japanese footballer (born 1996)

Personal information
- Date of birth: 6 December 1996 (age 29)
- Place of birth: Kagoshima Prefecture, Japan
- Height: 1.77 m (5 ft 10 in)
- Position: Midfielder

Team information
- Current team: AC Nagano Parceiro
- Number: 40

Youth career
- 2012–2014: Kagoshima Josei High School

College career
Years	Team	Apps	(Gls)
2015–2018	Miyazaki Sangyo-keiei University		

Senior career*
Years	Team	Apps	(Gls)
2019–2022	Oita Trinita	61	(0)
2022–2023	Tokushima Vortis	31	(0)
2024	SC Sagamihara	21	(0)
2025–	AC Nagano Parceiro	50	(1)
- * Club domestic league appearances and goals as of 17 August 2026

Yushi Hasegawa (長谷川 雄志, Hasegawa Yūshi; born 6 December 1996) is a Japanese professional footballer who plays as a midfielder for AC Nagano Parceiro.

== Career ==
Yushi made his league debut for Oita Trinita against Shonan Bellmare on 12 May 2019.

Yushi made his league debut for Tokushima against Zweigen Kanazawa on 19 February 2022.

== Career statistics ==
Updated to 7 December 2019.

Appearances and goals by club, season and competition
Club	Season	League			Emperor's Cup		J.League Cup		Total	
Club	Season	Division	Apps	Goals	Apps	Goals	Apps	Goals	Apps	Goals
Miyazaki Sangyo- keiei Univ.	2017	-	—		2	0	—		2	0
Oita Trinita	2019	J1 League	19	0	2	0	4	0	25	0
Career total			19	0	4	0	4	0	27	0
