= 2010 J.League Division 1 =

18th season of J1 League

J.League Division 1
- Season: 2010
- Champions: Nagoya Grampus; 1st J.League title 1st Japanese title
- Relegated: FC Tokyo; Kyoto Sanga; Shonan Bellmare
- Champions League: Nagoya Grampus; Gamba Osaka; Cerezo Osaka; Kashima Antlers
- Matches: 306
- Goals: 813 (2.66 per match)
- Top goalscorer: Joshua Kennedy & Ryoichi Maeda (17 goals)
- Highest attendance: 55,410 (Round 10, Reds vs. Grampus)
- Lowest attendance: 5,334 (Round 11, Sanfrecce vs. Cerezo)
- Average attendance: 18,428

The 2010 J.League Division 1 season was the 46th season of the top-flight club football in Japan and the 18th season since the establishment of J1 League. The season began on March 6 and ended on December 4.

A total of eighteen clubs participated in double round-robin format. At the end of the season, top three clubs received automatic qualification to the following years' AFC Champions League. Also, the bottom three clubs were relegated to J2 League by default.

Nagoya Grampus won their first ever Japanese championship. This was also the first time since the advent of the J.League that the top scorer scored less than 20 goals; the honour of scoring 17 goals was shared between Nagoya's Joshua Kennedy and Júbilo Iwata's Ryoichi Maeda. Additionally, this was also the first Japanese top division season in which clubs from the Kantō region did not place among the top three.

== Clubs ==
Location of the clubs in Japan

The following eighteen clubs participated in J.League Division 1 during the 2010 season. Of these clubs, Vegalta Sendai, Cerezo Osaka and Shonan Bellmare were newly promoted clubs. For the first time since 1995 season, all top-flight teams are located on a single island (Honshū).

| Club name | Home town(s) | Note(s) |
|---|---|---|
| Albirex Niigata | Niigata & Seirō, Niigata | |
| Cerezo Osaka | Osaka | Promoted from J2 League in 2009 |
| FC Tokyo | Tokyo | |
| Gamba Osaka | Suita, Osaka | 2010 ACL participant |
| Júbilo Iwata | Iwata, Shizuoka | |
| Kashima Antlers | Southwestern cities/towns of Ibaraki | 2010 ACL participant Three-time defending champions |
| Kawasaki Frontale | Kawasaki, Kanagawa | 2010 ACL participant |
| Kyoto Sanga | Southwestern cities/town in Kyoto | |
| Montedio Yamagata | All cities/towns in Yamagata | |
| Nagoya Grampus | Nagoya, Aichi | |
| Omiya Ardija | Saitama | |
| Sanfrecce Hiroshima | Hiroshima | 2010 ACL participant |
| Shonan Bellmare | Southcentral cities/towns in Kanagawa | Promoted from J2 League in 2009 |
| Shimizu S-Pulse | Shizuoka | |
| Urawa Red Diamonds | Saitama | |
| Vegalta Sendai | Sendai, Miyagi | Promoted from J2 League in 2009 |
| Vissel Kobe | Kobe, Hyōgo | |
| Yokohama F. Marinos | Yokohama & Yokosuka | |

=== Personnel ===
| Club | Head coach | Kit manufacturer | Shirt sponsor |
|---|---|---|---|
| Albirex Niigata | (Japan) Hisashi Kurosaki | Adidas | Kameda Seika |
| Cerezo Osaka | (Brazil) Levir Culpi | Mizuno | Yanmar |
| FC Tokyo | (Japan) Kiyoshi Okuma | Adidas | Lifeval |
| Gamba Osaka | (Japan) Akira Nishino | Umbro | Panasonic |
| Júbilo Iwata | (Japan) Masaaki Yanagishita | Puma | Yamaha |
| Kashima Antlers | (Brazil) Oswaldo de Oliveira | Nike | TOSTEM |
| Kawasaki Frontale | (Japan) Tsutomu Takahata | Asics | Fujitsu |
| Kyoto Sanga | (Japan) Yutaka Akita | Wacoal | Kyocera |
| Montedio Yamagata | (Japan) Shinji Kobayashi | Puma | Tsuyahime |
| Nagoya Grampus | (Serbia) Dragan Stojković | Le Coq Sportif | Toyota |
| Omiya Ardija | (Japan) Jun Suzuki | Under Armour | NTT Docomo |
| Sanfrecce Hiroshima | (Serbia) Mihailo Petrović | Mizuno | Deodeo |
| Shimizu S-Pulse | (Japan) Kenta Hasegawa | Puma | Suzuyo |
| Shonan Bellmare | (Japan) Yasuharu Sorimachi | A-Line | La Parler |
| Urawa Red Diamonds | (Germany) Volker Finke | Nike | Savas |
| Vegalta Sendai | (Japan) Makoto Teguramori | Asics | IRIS OHYAMA |
| Vissel Kobe | (Japan) Masahiro Wada | Asics | Rakuten |
| Yokohama F. Marinos | (Japan) Kazushi Kimura | Nike | Nissan |

=== Foreign players ===
| Club | Player 1 | Player 2 | Player 3 | AFC player | Non-visa foreign | Type-C contract | Former players |
|---|---|---|---|---|---|---|---|
| Albirex Niigata | (Brazil) João Paulo | (Brazil) Márcio Richardes | (Brazil) Michael | (South Korea) Cho Young-cheol | | (Brazil) Fagner | (Brazil) Bruno Suzuki |
| Cerezo Osaka | (Brazil) Adriano | (Brazil) Amaral | (Brazil) Martinez | (South Korea) Kim Jin-hyeon | | | |
| FC Tokyo | (Brazil) Ricardinho | | | (South Korea) Kim Young-gwon | | (South Korea) Seo Yong-duk | |
| Gamba Osaka | (Brazil) Dodô | (Brazil) Lucas Severino | (South Korea) Cho Jae-jin | (South Korea) Lee Keun-ho | | | (Brazil) Pedro Júnior (Brazil) Zé Carlos |
| Júbilo Iwata | (Brazil) Gilsinho | (South Korea) Lee Woo-jin | | (South Korea) Park Joo-ho | (North Korea) Hwang Song-su | | (South Korea) Lee Keun-ho |
| Kashima Antlers | (Brazil) Fellype Gabriel | (Brazil) Gilton | (Brazil) Marquinhos | | | | (South Korea) Lee Jung-soo |
| Kawasaki Frontale | (Brazil) Juninho | (Brazil) Renatinho | (Brazil) Vitor Júnior | | (North Korea) Jong Tae-se | | |
| Kyoto Sanga | (Brazil) Diego Souza | (Brazil) Junior Dutra | (Brazil) Thiego | (South Korea) Kwak Tae-hwi | (North Korea) Kim Song-yong | | |
| Montedio Yamagata | (South Korea) Han Dong-won | (South Korea) Kim Byung-suk | (South Korea) Kim Kun-hoan | | | | |
| Nagoya Grampus | (Brazil) Magnum | (Colombia) Danilson Córdoba | (Montenegro) Igor Burzanović | (Australia) Joshua Kennedy | | | |
| Omiya Ardija | (Brazil) Rafael Marques | (Croatia) Mato Neretljak | (South Korea) Lee Chun-soo | (South Korea) Lee Ho | (North Korea) An Yong-hak | | (Brazil) Dudu (South Korea) Seo Yong-duk |
| Sanfrecce Hiroshima | (Bulgaria) Ilian Stoyanov | (Croatia) Mihael Mikić | | | | | |
| Shonan Bellmare | (Brazil) Emerson Paulista | (Brazil) Jean | (Brazil) Valdo | (South Korea) Han Kook-young | (South Korea) Kim Yeong-gi | (South Korea) Choi Seung-in | |
| Shimizu S-Pulse | (Norway) Frode Johnsen | | | (Australia) Eddy Bosnar | | | |
| Urawa Red Diamonds | (Brazil) Edmílson | (Brazil) Robson Ponte | (Burkina Faso) Wilfried Sanou | (Australia) Matthew Spiranovic | | | |
| Vegalta Sendai | (Brazil) Elizeu | (Brazil) Fernandinho | (South Korea) Park Ju-sung | (South Korea) Park Sung-ho | (North Korea) Ryang Yong-gi | | (Brazil) Reinaldo Alagoano |
| Vissel Kobe | (Brazil) Edmilson Alves | (Brazil) Popó | (Brazil) Raphael Botti | (South Korea) Lee Jae-min | (South Korea) Park Kang-jo | | |
| Yokohama F. Marinos | (Argentina) Pablo Bastianini | | | | | (South Korea) Jeong Dong-ho | |

== Format ==
Eighteen clubs will play in double round-robin (home and away) format, a total of 34 games each. A club receives 3 points for a win, 1 point for a tie, and 0 points for a loss. The clubs are ranked by points, and tie breakers are, in the following order:

- Goal differential
- Goals scored
- Head-to-head results
- Disciplinary points

A draw would be conducted, if necessary. However, if two clubs are tied at the first place, both clubs will be declared as the champions. The bottom three clubs will be relegated to J.League Division 2. The top three clubs will qualify to AFC Champions League in the following year.

Changes from previous year

- Regular season schedule had two months break after May 16 games, due to 2010 FIFA World Cup. The season was resumed from July 17, with exceptions for clubs advancing to the Round of 16 of 2010 AFC Champions League, which 11th-week matches were rescheduled to July 14.

== League table ==
| Pos | Team | Pld | W | D | L | GF | GA | GD | Pts | Qualification or relegation |
|---|---|---|---|---|---|---|---|---|---|---|
| 1 | Nagoya Grampus (C) | 34 | 23 | 3 | 8 | 54 | 37 | +17 | 72 | Qualification for 2011 AFC Champions League group stage (Note: Kashima Antlers qualified as 2010 Emperor's Cup winners.) |
| 2 | Gamba Osaka | 34 | 18 | 8 | 8 | 65 | 44 | +21 | 62 | Qualification for 2011 AFC Champions League group stage |
| 3 | Cerezo Osaka | 34 | 17 | 10 | 7 | 58 | 32 | +26 | 61 | Qualification for 2011 AFC Champions League group stage |
| 4 | Kashima Antlers | 34 | 16 | 12 | 6 | 51 | 31 | +20 | 60 | Qualification for 2011 AFC Champions League group stage |
| 5 | Kawasaki Frontale | 34 | 15 | 9 | 10 | 61 | 47 | +14 | 54 | |
| 6 | Shimizu S-Pulse | 34 | 15 | 9 | 10 | 60 | 49 | +11 | 54 | |
| 7 | Sanfrecce Hiroshima | 34 | 14 | 9 | 11 | 45 | 38 | +7 | 51 | |
| 8 | Yokohama F. Marinos | 34 | 15 | 6 | 13 | 43 | 39 | +4 | 51 | |
| 9 | Albirex Niigata | 34 | 12 | 13 | 9 | 48 | 45 | +3 | 49 | |
| 10 | Urawa Red Diamonds | 34 | 14 | 6 | 14 | 48 | 41 | +7 | 48 | |
| 11 | Júbilo Iwata | 34 | 11 | 11 | 12 | 38 | 49 | −11 | 44 | |
| 12 | Omiya Ardija | 34 | 11 | 9 | 14 | 39 | 45 | −6 | 42 | |
| 13 | Montedio Yamagata | 34 | 11 | 9 | 14 | 29 | 42 | −13 | 42 | |
| 14 | Vegalta Sendai | 34 | 10 | 9 | 15 | 40 | 46 | −6 | 39 | |
| 15 | Vissel Kobe | 34 | 9 | 11 | 14 | 37 | 45 | −8 | 38 | |
| 16 | FC Tokyo (R) | 34 | 8 | 12 | 14 | 36 | 41 | −5 | 36 | Relegation to 2011 J.League Division 2 |
| 17 | Kyoto Sanga (R) | 34 | 4 | 7 | 23 | 30 | 60 | −30 | 19 | Relegation to 2011 J.League Division 2 |
| 18 | Shonan Bellmare (R) | 34 | 3 | 7 | 24 | 31 | 82 | −51 | 16 | Relegation to 2011 J.League Division 2 |

Updated to match(es) played on December 4, 2010. Source: J.League Division 1
Rules for classification: 1) points; 2) goal difference; 3) number of goals scored.
(C) Champions; (R) Relegated

== Results ==
| Home \ Away | ALB | ANT | ARD | BEL | CER | FRO | GAM | GRA | JÚB | MON | SFR | SAN | SSP | TOK | RED | VEG | VIS | FMA |
|---|---|---|---|---|---|---|---|---|---|---|---|---|---|---|---|---|---|---|
| Albirex Niigata | | 2–1 | 0–0 | 3–1 | 1–1 | 2–1 | 1–2 | 4–1 | 1–1 | 3–1 | 2–2 | 1–1 | 4–1 | 2–1 | 0–2 | 1–1 | 1–1 | 2–1 |
| Kashima Antlers | 2–2 | | 3–0 | 1–0 | 0–1 | 2–1 | 2–1 | 1–0 | 1–2 | 3–1 | 0–0 | 2–1 | 1–1 | 1–1 | 2–0 | 1–0 | 3–0 | 2–0 |
| Omiya Ardija | 2–2 | 0–1 | | 3–0 | 3–0 | 2–2 | 1–3 | 0–1 | 0–0 | 2–1 | 0–0 | 2–1 | 3–0 | 0–2 | 1–2 | 0–3 | 2–2 | 1–1 |
| Shonan Bellmare | 2–0 | 1–1 | 1–3 | | 0–4 | 1–6 | 1–3 | 0–1 | 0–0 | 1–1 | 1–3 | 2–2 | 3–6 | 1–3 | 1–4 | 1–0 | 2–2 | 1–4 |
| Cerezo Osaka | 2–1 | 2–1 | 2–0 | 2–1 | | 0–0 | 1–1 | 0–1 | 6–2 | 3–0 | 1–1 | 3–1 | 1–0 | 4–1 | 2–3 | 0–0 | 2–1 | 2–0 |
| Kawasaki Frontale | 2–1 | 1–2 | 0–0 | 4–2 | 1–2 | | 1–2 | 4–0 | 1–1 | 2–0 | 2–0 | 1–0 | 0–0 | 2–1 | 1–1 | 3–2 | 3–0 | 1–3 |
| Gamba Osaka | 0–0 | 1–1 | 5–1 | 2–1 | 3–2 | 4–4 | | 1–2 | 2–0 | 1–0 | 2–0 | 1–1 | 1–1 | 2–0 | 3–2 | 2–2 | 2–4 | 0–2 |
| Nagoya Grampus | 1–1 | 1–4 | 2–1 | 2–1 | 1–0 | 2–3 | 3–1 | | 2–0 | 2–1 | 2–1 | 1–0 | 3–3 | 0–1 | 3–1 | 2–1 | 2–0 | 1–1 |
| Júbilo Iwata | 1–1 | 2–3 | 1–1 | 3–2 | 0–3 | 3–1 | 4–3 | 1–2 | | 0–0 | 2–1 | 2–3 | 2–1 | 2–1 | 2–1 | 0–1 | 3–2 | 0–0 |
| Montedio Yamagata | 1–0 | 1–1 | 1–0 | 1–1 | 3–3 | 0–0 | 2–1 | 0–1 | 1–0 | | 1–0 | 1–0 | 0–3 | 0–3 | 1–1 | 3–1 | 0–0 | 0–1 |
| Sanfrecce Hiroshima | 4–0 | 1–1 | 1–2 | 3–0 | 0–5 | 0–3 | 0–2 | 1–0 | 1–1 | 2–1 | | 3–0 | 1–1 | 2–1 | 2–1 | 1–0 | 1–1 | 3–0 |
| Kyoto Sanga | 0–2 | 1–1 | 0–2 | 0–1 | 0–1 | 3–4 | 1–2 | 0–2 | 0–1 | 1–2 | 0–3 | | 2–4 | 2–0 | 0–4 | 2–1 | 3–0 | 1–2 |
| Shimizu S-Pulse | 0–2 | 2–1 | 2–1 | 5–0 | 3–2 | 2–0 | 0–3 | 1–5 | 0–0 | 3–0 | 2–1 | 1–1 | | 1–2 | 2–1 | 5–1 | 1–0 | 1–2 |
| FC Tokyo | 1–1 | 1–1 | 0–1 | 3–0 | 0–0 | 1–2 | 1–1 | 0–1 | 1–1 | 1–1 | 0–2 | 1–1 | 2–2 | | 0–1 | 0–0 | 2–2 | 1–0 |
| Urawa Red Diamonds | 2–0 | 1–1 | 0–1 | 2–1 | 2–0 | 3–0 | 0–2 | 2–1 | 0–1 | 0–1 | 0–1 | 2–0 | 1–1 | 1–0 | | 1–1 | 0–4 | 2–3 |
| Vegalta Sendai | 2–3 | 2–1 | 3–1 | 2–1 | 1–1 | 1–1 | 1–3 | 1–2 | 3–0 | 2–0 | 1–1 | 1–0 | 1–3 | 3–2 | 1–1 | | 0–1 | 0–1 |
| Vissel Kobe | 1–2 | 0–0 | 3–1 | 0–0 | 0–0 | 0–4 | 1–3 | 1–2 | 3–0 | 0–2 | 1–2 | 2–0 | 1–0 | 0–0 | 1–0 | 2–0 | | 1–1 |
| Yokohama F. Marinos | 3–0 | 1–3 | 0–2 | 3–0 | 0–0 | 4–0 | 1–0 | 0–2 | 1–0 | 0–1 | 2–1 | 2–2 | 1–2 | 1–2 | 1–4 | 0–1 | 1–0 | |

Updated to match(es) played on December 4, 2010. Source: J. League Division 1
Legend: Blue = home team win; Yellow = draw; Red = away team win.

== Top scorers ==
| Rank | Scorer | Club | Goals |
|---|---|---|---|
| 1 | (Australia) Joshua Kennedy | Nagoya Grampus | 17 |
| 1 | (Japan) Ryoichi Maeda | Júbilo Iwata | 17 |
| 3 | (Brazil) Edmílson | Urawa Red Diamonds | 16 |
| 3 | (Brazil) Márcio Richardes | Albirex Niigata | 16 |
| 5 | (Brazil) Adriano | Cerezo Osaka | 14 |
| 5 | (Brazil) Juninho | Kawasaki Frontale | 14 |
| 5 | (Japan) Shoki Hirai | Gamba Osaka | 14 |
| 8 | (Japan) Jungo Fujimoto | Shimizu S-Pulse | 13 |
| 8 | (Japan) Keiji Tamada | Nagoya Grampus | 13 |
| 8 | (Japan) Shinji Okazaki | Shimizu S-Pulse | 13 |

== Awards ==
=== MVP ===
- (Japan) Seigo Narazaki

=== Top scorers ===
- (Australia) Joshua Kennedy & (Japan) Ryoichi Maeda

=== Best XI ===
| Position | Player |
|---|---|
| GK | (Japan) Seigo Narazaki |
| DF | (Japan) Marcus Tulio Tanaka |
| DF | (Japan) Takahiro Masukawa |
| DF | (Japan) Tomoaki Makino |
| MF | (Brazil) Márcio Richardes |
| MF | (Colombia) Danilson Córdoba |
| MF | (Japan) Jungo Fujimoto |
| MF | (Japan) Kengo Nakamura |
| MF | (Japan) Yasuhito Endō |
| FW | (Australia) Joshua Kennedy |
| FW | (Japan) Ryoichi Maeda |

== Attendances ==
| Pos | Team | Total | High | Low | Average | Change |
|---|---|---|---|---|---|---|
| 1 | Urawa Red Diamonds | 678,994 | 55,410 | 21,625 | 39,941 | −9.7% |
| 2 | Albirex Niigata | 519,221 | 41,002 | 19,152 | 30,542 | −8.7% |
| 3 | Yokohama F. Marinos | 436,624 | 43,025 | 12,184 | 25,684 | +16.4% |
| 4 | FC Tokyo | 426,899 | 30,672 | 17,477 | 25,112 | −3.0% |
| 5 | Kashima Antlers | 356,430 | 35,251 | 9,472 | 20,966 | −3.0% |
| 6 | Nagoya Grampus | 339,638 | 34,098 | 7,991 | 19,979 | +25.4% |
| 7 | Kawasaki Frontale | 315,550 | 22,407 | 7,348 | 18,562 | −1.5% |
| 8 | Shimizu S-Pulse | 306,022 | 38,851 | 7,117 | 18,001 | +0.4% |
| 9 | Vegalta Sendai | 294,644 | 26,391 | 12,119 | 17,332 | +33.8%^{†} |
| 10 | Gamba Osaka | 283,111 | 20,973 | 9,093 | 16,654 | −6.0% |
| 11 | Cerezo Osaka | 255,439 | 37,860 | 8,041 | 15,026 | +51.6%^{†} |
| 12 | Sanfrecce Hiroshima | 247,550 | 23,948 | 5,334 | 14,562 | −7.4% |
| 13 | Vissel Kobe | 218,004 | 19,506 | 8,707 | 12,824 | −1.9% |
| 14 | Júbilo Iwata | 206,324 | 31,266 | 7,030 | 12,137 | −10.2% |
| 15 | Montedio Yamagata | 199,069 | 20,231 | 7,019 | 11,710 | −2.9% |
| 16 | Shonan Bellmare | 188,614 | 14,095 | 6,032 | 11,095 | +43.7%^{†} |
| 17 | Omiya Ardija | 188,088 | 29,575 | 7,831 | 11,064 | −19.3% |
| 18 | Kyoto Sanga | 178,673 | 15,222 | 6,818 | 10,510 | −5.5% |
| | League total | 5,638,894 | 55,410 | 5,334 | 18,428 | −2.9% |

Updated to games played on December 4, 2010
Source: J. League Division 1
Notes:
^{†} Team played previous season in J2.
