= Yutaka Tanoue =

Japanese footballer

Yutaka Tanoue 田上 裕
Personal information
- Full name: Yutaka Tanoue
- Date of birth: 12 January 1986 (age 40)
- Place of birth: Kagoshima, Japan
- Height: 1.78 m (5 ft 10 in)
- Positions: Midfielder; full-back

Youth career
- 2001–2003: Kagoshima Jōsei High School
- 2004–2007: Miyazaki Sangyo-keiei University

Senior career*
Years	Team	Apps	(Gls)
2008	FC Kariya	27	(1)
2009	FC Ryukyu	20	(1)
2010–2013	FC Kagoshima	51	(26)
2014–2019	Kagoshima United	84	(2)

Managerial career
- 2010–2012: FC Kagoshima (player-manager)
- * Club domestic league appearances and goals

Yutaka Tanoue (田上 裕, Tanoue Yutaka; born 12 January 1986) is a Japanese former footballer who mostly played for Kagoshima United FC.

== Club statistics ==
Updated to 14 April 2020.

Club performance			League		Cup		Total	
Season	Club	League	Apps	Goals	Apps	Goals	Apps	Goals
Japan			League		Emperor's Cup		Total	
2008	FC Kariya	JFL	27	1	–		27	1
2009	FC Ryukyu	JFL	20	1	–		20	1
2010	FC Kagoshima	KFA			–			
2011	FC Kagoshima	JRL (Kyushu)	17	12	2	1	19	13
2012	FC Kagoshima	JRL (Kyushu)	17	5	–		17	5
2013	FC Kagoshima	JRL (Kyushu)	17	9	–		17	9
2014	Kagoshima; United FC	JFL	20	0	2	0	22	0
2015	Kagoshima; United FC	JFL	20	2	1	0	21	2
2016	Kagoshima; United FC	J3 League	25	0	1	0	26	0
2017	Kagoshima; United FC	J3 League	10	0	0	0	10	0
2018	Kagoshima; United FC	J3 League	1	0	0	0	1	0
2019	Kagoshima; United FC	J2 League	8	0	1	0	9	0
Career total			182	30	7	1	189	31
