= Joshua Kennedy =

Australian soccer player (born 1982)

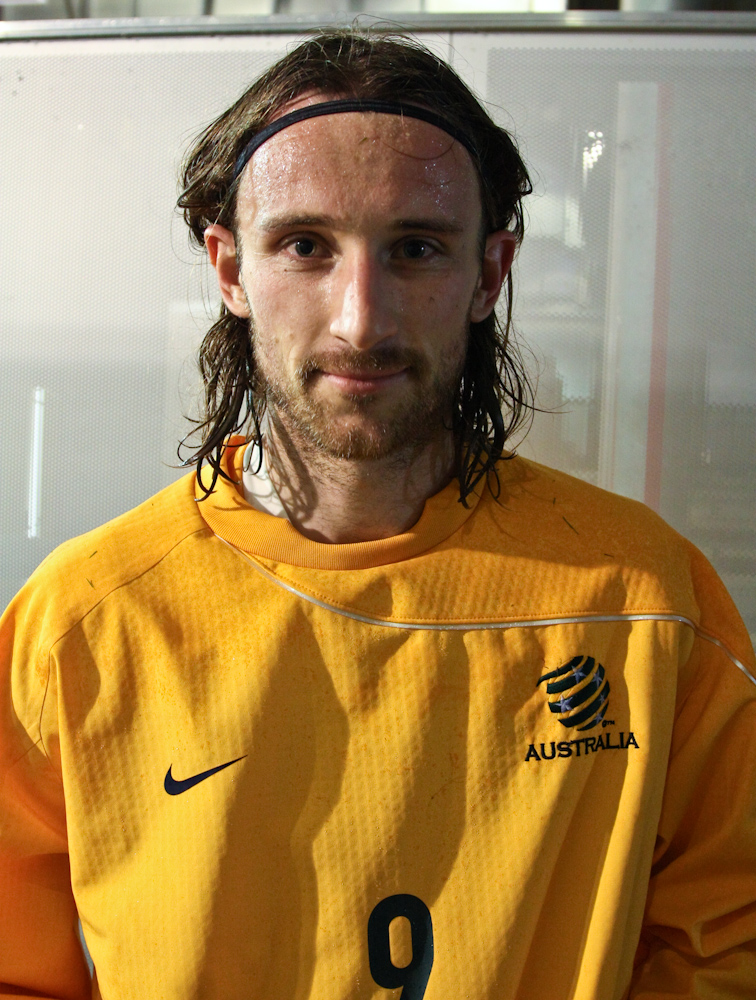
- Kennedy with Australia in 2009

Personal information
- Full name: Joshua Blake Kennedy
- Date of birth: 20 August 1982 (age 44)
- Place of birth: Wodonga, Victoria, Australia
- Height: 1.94 m (6 ft 4 in)
- Position: Striker

Youth career
- Twin City Wanderers
- SS&A Boomers
- 1999: AIS

Senior career*
Years	Team	Apps	(Gls)
1999–2000	Carlton	4	(0)
2000–2002	VfL Wolfsburg	8	(2)
2002–2003	Stuttgarter Kickers	23	(1)
2003–2004	1. FC Köln	4	(0)
2004–2006	Dynamo Dresden	60	(16)
2006–2007	1. FC Nürnberg	12	(1)
2008–2009	Karlsruher SC	33	(6)
2009–2014	Nagoya Grampus	133	(64)
2015	Melbourne City	12	(2)
Total		290	(92)

International career
1999	Australia U-17	9	(0)
2001	Australia U-20	14	(7)
2006–2014	Australia	36	(17)
Medal record
Representing Australia
Men's Association football
OFC U-19 Men's Championship
Winner	2001 Cook Islands/New Caledonia
- * Club domestic league appearances and goals

Joshua Blake Kennedy (born 20 August 1982) is an Australian former professional soccer who played as a striker for the Australia national soccer team. At club level, he played mostly for soccer clubs in Germany and Japan.

Kennedy is known by Australian fans as "Jesus" due to his apparent resemblance to traditional depictions of Jesus earlier in his playing career.

== Club career ==
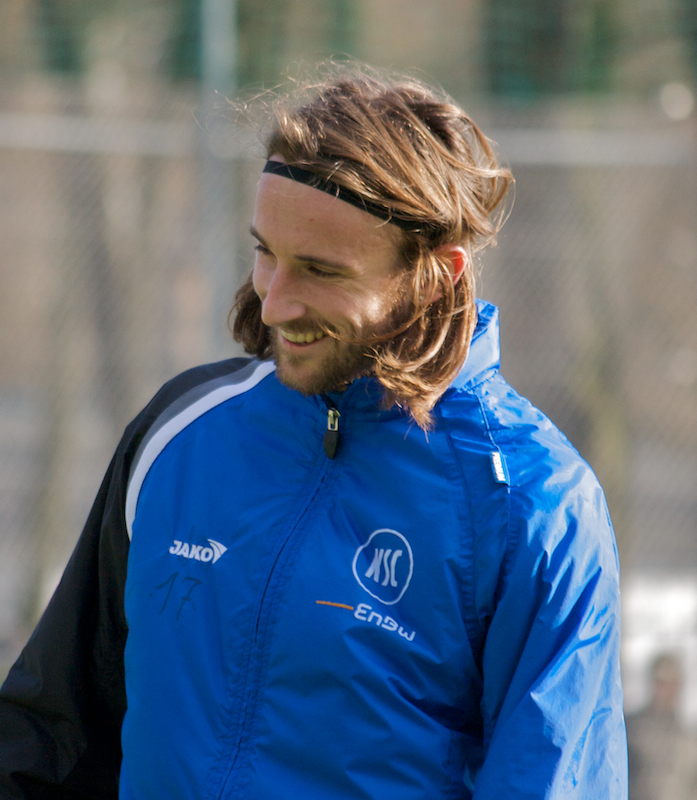
Joshua Kennedy with Karlsruher SC in 2008.

Born in Wodonga, Victoria, Kennedy began playing junior football in Albury/Wodonga, near his hometown of Yackandandah in Victoria, Australia. There, he played with the Twin City Wanderers and later SS&A Boomers. His talents won a scholarship place in the Australian Institute of Sport program, leading to a professional contract at new National Soccer League club Carlton in 1999, alongside fellow AIS graduates Vince Grella and Mark Bresciano.

After a season, he made a move to Europe transferring to Bundesliga club VfL Wolfsburg. His debut as a substitute coming on five minutes from time in the 4–4 draw against fellow Northern German side Hamburger SV on 13 September 2000, at age 17 made him the youngest player ever to appear for VfL. It was his only appearance for the first team that year, and the following season brought little change for Kennedy as he managed just seven appearances for the Bundesliga side, starting only once. However, he scored two goals in the 2001–02 season, with his first ever Bundesliga goal coming on 8 September 2001 against Energie Cottbus.

At the start of the following season Kennedy was transferred to Regionalliga Süd side Stuttgarter Kickers, where he was a regular feature playing 23 games for the Swabian side. After just one season Kennedy left for Cologne where he joined (at the time) Bundesliga club 1. FC Köln. However, he mostly played for their reserve team in the Regionalliga Nord, where he was the club's second-top scorer of the season with nine goals in twenty-three games.

Having just won promotion to 2. Bundesliga, Dynamo Dresden were looking for a striker and found it in the then 22-year-old Victorian. This transfer, his fourth in four years, proved to be a vital one in Kennedy's career. He immediately found a first-team spot with the Saxon side and played in all of the club's thirty-four league matches – again becoming the second-top scorer of his club with nine goals. The following season, he was again an integral part in the club's fight against relegation scoring seven goals and setting up four. This attracted the interest of Bundesliga club 1. FC Nürnberg who signed Kennedy to a three-year contract, and of Australian national coach Guus Hiddink who called the previously uncapped Kennedy up to the Australian Squad for the 2006 FIFA World Cup.

In July 2006, during his first training session with Nürnberg, Kennedy ruptured his right Achilles tendon.

On 11 January 2008, fellow German Bundesliga club Karlsruher SC announced the signing of Kennedy via an undisclosed transfer fee. He is contracted until June 2011. His first goal for Karlsruhe came on his debut against his former club Nürnberg in what would turn out to be a cruel twist of fate for the latter – just weeks after leaving them. Kennedy went on to score four goals in his first five appearances and was widely praised for his performances. However, following this stunning start he did not manage to score in 21 consecutive Bundesliga matches and finally lost his starting position. After a further disappointing appearance in an important cup tie on 28 January 2009, Kennedy was replaced in the second half of the match and subsequently refused to shake hands with his coach. Due to this behaviour, he was thrown out of the squad. On 2 February 2009, Kennedy once again made negative headlines when he announced his intention to leave the club as soon as possible. After five months without any Bundesliga appearances Kennedy was finally allowed to return to the squad even though he still refused to apologise. On 18 April 2009, he was part of the starting line-up for the first time since his suspension. Altogether, Kennedy started 20 of his 23 appearances but – after 27 goalless games – was only able to score twice in the final match of the season which proved to be of no relevance because Karlsruhe nevertheless was relegated from the Bundesliga.

On 17 June 2009, he signed a contract with Nagoya Grampus until 31 December 2011. Kennedy scored a goal on debut for Nagoya Grampus in his side's 1–1 draw. In the 2010 season, Kennedy helped Nagoya win their first-ever league title, becoming a joint top scorer with Ryoichi Maeda on 17 goals. He was also named in the 2010 J. League Best Eleven. On 23 September 2011, Kennedy scored off a Kensuke Nagai cross to help his side to a 3–1 win over Vissel Kobe. The result put Grampus one point behind leaders Gamba Osaka and gave Kennedy his 15th goal of the 2011 J. League season, putting him one goal above Ventforet Kofu's striker Mike Havenaar. Kennedy finished the season with 19 goals and the J-league golden boot.

On 6 November 2014, it was announced that he had signed with Melbourne City as their Australian Marquee. He joined the team in January 2015. Kennedy debuted for City against Melbourne Victory, being substituted on the field for Safuwan Baharudin in the 60th minute. He opened his scoring account for City with their second goal in the clinical 3-2 win over Adelaide United. He added a second goal to his record with a composed finished against the Wellington Phoenix in their Finals eliminations clash.

Kennedy announced his retirement from professional soccer on 26 June 2015 due to persistent injuries. Kennedy finished his career with a J-League Championship, two J-League Golden Boots, a DFB Pokal Cup and 17 international goals for the Socceroos across three World Cup campaigns.

== International career ==
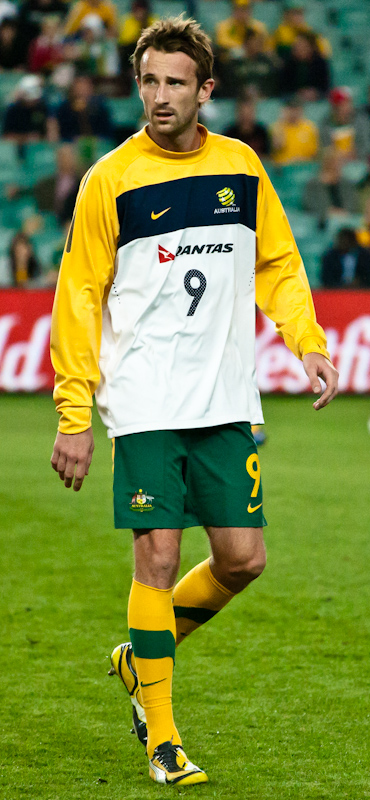
Kennedy warming up before a game for Australia in 2010

In 1999, Kennedy represented Australia at the U17 World cup and the Young Socceroos in 2001 at the U20 Youth World Cup in Argentina.

Kennedy received his first international cap in a pre-2006 World Cup friendly against Liechtenstein and made his mark in this game with a headed goal. He came on as a substitute in Australia's first 2006 World Cup game, in which Australia beat Japan 3–1 by scoring three goals in the last eight minutes. Kennedy was touted as Hiddink's secret weapon against the Japanese because he was taller than all of the Japanese defenders. He followed this up with a second appearance as a substitute in Australia's third Group Stage game against Croatia.

Injury prevented Kennedy from participating in Australia's 2007 AFC Asian Cup campaign. Kennedy was recalled to the Socceroos squad to face Argentina in a friendly on 11 September. On 6 February 2008, he scored his second international goal against Qatar in a World Cup qualifier held in Melbourne, his third against South Africa, fourth against Holland and his fifth against Qatar again. On 1 April 2009, he scored his sixth goal for Australia, Kennedy came on as a substitute on the 60th minute for Scott McDonald and scored a header against Uzbekistan giving Australia a 1–0 lead.

Under new Socceroos coach Holger Oseick, Kennedy has flourished scoring eight goals in just five matches. These goals included two against New Zealand in June, the equaliser against Thailand in September, a double against Saudi Arabia, another double against Malaysia and Australia's second goal in a 3–0 win against Oman.

His most important goal, however, came in Australia's last World Cup qualification match on 18 June 2013. After not earning a game for over a year, he came on as a 77th-minute substitute for Tim Cahill and scored Australia's only goal against Iraq with an 83rd-minute header to secure a win and a spot in the World Cup finals.

Nicknamed "Jesus" due to his former long haired aesthetic which many thought resembled traditional artistic representations of the Christian religious figure, many sections of the Australian media praised Kennedy as a "saviour" in their commentary during the World Cup Qualifying game against Iraq. Some publications chose to play on the fact that the statue of Christ The Redeemer statue is an iconic image of Rio and Kennedy's goal scoring celebrations were seen to mimic the pose of the statue.

Headlines such as "Jesus Saves!" were amended as a result of complaints that largely focussed on religious insensitivity given that Iraq is a predominantly Muslim nation.

Kennedy was selected for the Brazil 2014 World Cup squad, after his goal qualified Australia for the tournament. On 4 June 2014, at the socceroos' training camp near Rio, Kennedy was cut from the team due to injury.

== Personal life ==
Kennedy is married to Australian Opals player Jacinta Hamilton.

== Career statistics ==
=== Club ===
As of match played 8 May 2015

Appearances and goals by club, season and competition
Club	Season	League			National cup		League cup		Continental		Other		Total	
Club	Season	Division	Apps	Goals	Apps	Goals	Apps	Goals	Apps	Goals	Apps	Goals	Apps	Goals
Carlton	1999–00	NSL	4	0	0	0	–		–		–		4	0
VfL Wolfsburg	2000–01	Bundesliga	1	0	0	0	0	0	–		–		1	0
VfL Wolfsburg	2001–02	Bundesliga	7	2	1	2	0	0	1	0	–		9	4
VfL Wolfsburg	Total		8	2	1	2	0	0	1	0	0	0	10	4
Stuttgarter Kickers	2002–03	Regionalliga Süd	23	1	0	0	–		–		–		23	1
1. FC Köln	2003–04	Bundesliga	4	0	0	0	0	0	–		–		4	0
Dynamo Dresden	2004–05	2. Bundesliga	34	9	1	0	–		–		–		35	9
Dynamo Dresden	2005–06	2. Bundesliga	26	7	1	0	–		–		–		27	7
Dynamo Dresden	Total		60	16	2	0	0	0	0	0	0	0	62	16
1. FC Nürnberg	2006–07	Bundesliga	0	0	0	0	–		–		–		0	0
1. FC Nürnberg	2007–08	Bundesliga	12	1	2	1	1	0	3	0	–		18	2
1. FC Nürnberg	Total		12	1	2	1	1	0	3	0	0	0	18	2
Karlsruher SC	2007–08	Bundesliga	10	4	0	0	–		–		–		10	4
Karlsruher SC	2008–09	Bundesliga	23	2	3	0	–		–		–		26	2
Karlsruher SC	Total		33	6	3	0	0	0	0	0	0	0	36	6
Nagoya Grampus	2009	J1 League	15	6	1	0	1	0	4	3	–		21	9
Nagoya Grampus	2010	J1 League	31	17	0	0	1	1	–		–		32	18
Nagoya Grampus	2011	J1 League	31	19	0	0	0	0	4	0	–		35	19
Nagoya Grampus	2012	J1 League	18	5	1	0	0	0	4	1	–		22	6
Nagoya Grampus	2013	J1 League	27	12	0	0	2	0	–		–		29	12
Nagoya Grampus	2014	J1 League	11	5	0	0	0	0	–		–		11	5
Nagoya Grampus	Total		133	64	2	0	4	1	12	4	0	0	151	69
Melbourne City	2014–15	A-League	12	2	0	0	–		–		–		12	2
Career total			289	92	10	3	5	1	16	4	0	0	320	100

=== International ===
Appearances and goals by national team and year
National team	Year	Apps	Goals
Australia	2006	3	1
Australia	2007	1	0
Australia	2008	6	4
Australia	2009	7	1
Australia	2010	6	1
Australia	2011	7	8
Australia	2012	0	0
Australia	2013	5	2
Australia	2014	1	0
Total		36	17

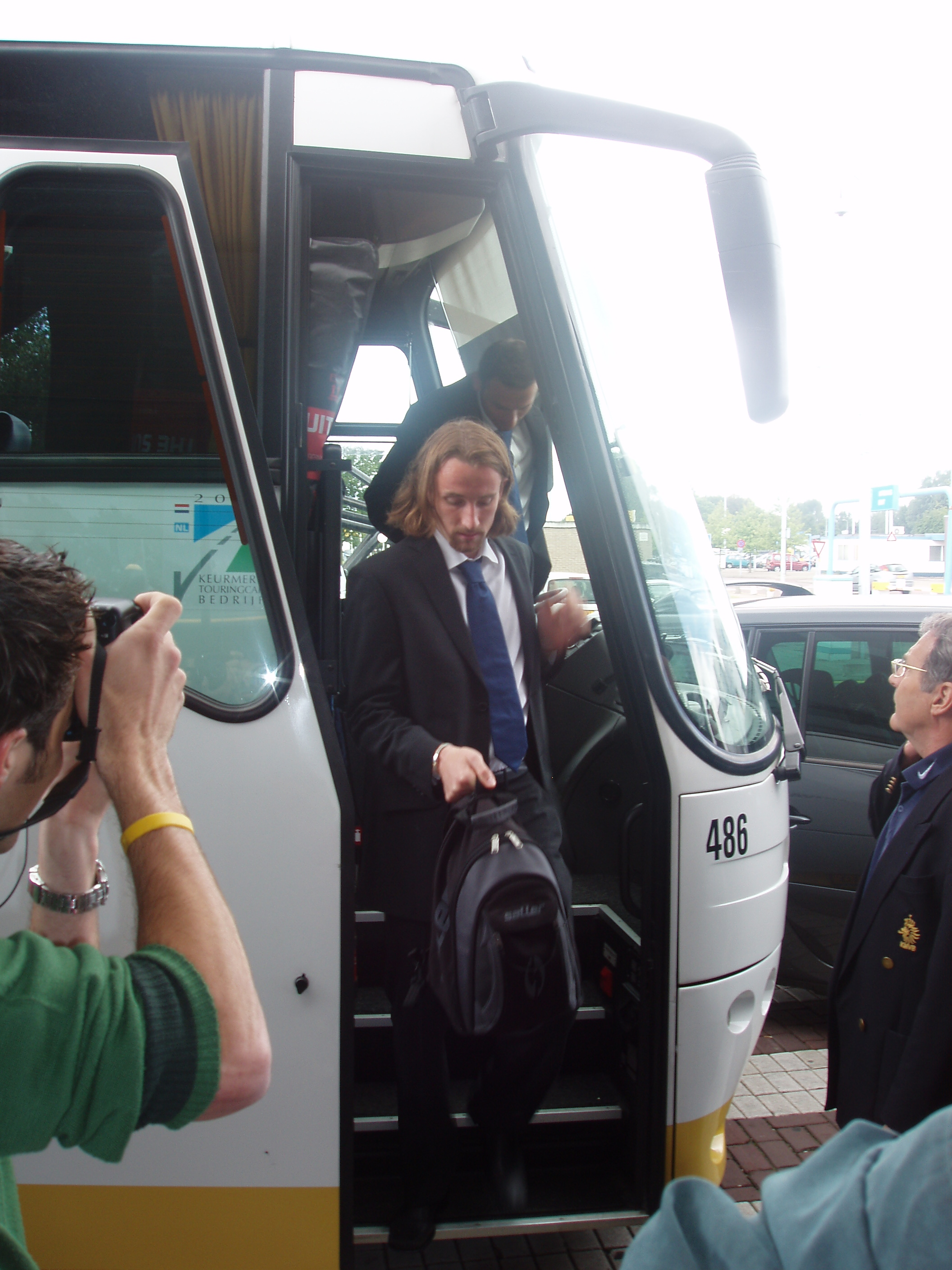
Josh Kennedy at Rotterdam Airport before leaving for the World Cup Finals in Germany in June 2006

Scores and results list Australia's goal tally first, score column indicates score after each Kennedy goal.

List of international goals scored by Joshua Kennedy
No.	Date	Venue	Opponent	Score	Result	Competition
1	7 June 2006	Donaustadion, Ulm, Germany	Liechtenstein	2–1	3–1	Friendly
2	6 February 2008	Telstra Dome, Melbourne, Australia	Qatar	1–0	3–0	2010 FIFA World Cup qualification
3	19 August 2008	Loftus Road, London, England	South Africa	2–1	2–2	Friendly
4	6 September 2008	Philips Stadion, Eindhoven, Netherlands	Netherlands	2–1	2–1	Friendly
5	15 October 2008	Suncorp Stadium, Brisbane, Australia	Qatar	4–0	4–0	2010 FIFA World Cup qualification
6	1 April 2009	Stadium Australia, Sydney, Australia	Uzbekistan	1–0	2–0	2010 FIFA World Cup qualification
7	1 June 2010	Ruimsig Stadium, Johannesburg, South Africa	Denmark	1–0	1–0	Friendly
8	5 June 2011	Adelaide Oval, Adelaide, Australia	New Zealand	1–0	3–0	Friendly
9	5 June 2011	Adelaide Oval, Adelaide, Australia	New Zealand	2–0	3–0	Friendly
10	2 September 2011	Suncorp Stadium, Brisbane, Australia	Thailand	1–1	2–1	2014 FIFA World Cup qualification
11	6 September 2011	Prince Mohamed bin Fahd Stadium, Dammam, Saudi Arabia	Saudi Arabia	1–0	3–1	2014 FIFA World Cup qualification
12	6 September 2011	Prince Mohamed bin Fahd Stadium, Dammam, Saudi Arabia	Saudi Arabia	2–0	3–1	2014 FIFA World Cup qualification
13	7 October 2011	Canberra Stadium, Canberra, Australia	Malaysia	2–0	5–0	Friendly
14	7 October 2011	Canberra Stadium, Canberra, Australia	Malaysia	4–0	5–0	Friendly
15	11 October 2011	ANZ Stadium, Sydney, Australia	Oman	2–0	3–0	2014 FIFA World Cup qualification
16	18 June 2013	ANZ Stadium, Sydney, Australia	Iraq	1–0	1–0	2014 FIFA World Cup qualification
17	16 October 2013	Craven Cottage, London, England	Canada	1–0	3–0	Friendly

== Honours ==
=== Player ===
1. FC Nürnberg

- DFB-Pokal: 2006–07

Nagoya Grampus

- J1 League: 2010
- Japanese Super Cup: 2011

Australia U-20

- OFC U-19 Men's Championship: 2001

=== Individual ===
- Bundesliga Player of the Month: February 2008
- J. League Top Scorer: 2010, 2011
- J. League Best Eleven: 2010, 2011
