= Masato Sakurai =

Japanese footballer

Personal information
- Full name: Masato Sakurai
- Date of birth: September 25, 1986 (age 40)
- Place of birth: Ibaraki, Japan
- Height: 1.83 m (6 ft 0 in)
- Position: Forward

Youth career
- 2001–2004: Kashiwa Reysol
- 2005–2008: Tokoha University

Senior career*
Years	Team	Apps	(Gls)
2009–2010	Kataller Toyama	33	(3)
2011	Sagawa Printing	20	(1)
Total		53	(4)
- * Club domestic league appearances and goals

Masato Sakurai (桜井 正人, Sakurai Masato; born September 25, 1986) is a former Japanese football player.

== Career statistics ==
Appearances and goals by club, season and competition
Club	Season	League			Emperor's Cup		Total	
Club	Season	Division	Apps	Goals	Apps	Goals	Apps	Goals
Kataller Toyama	2009	J2 League	29	3	2	0	31	3
Kataller Toyama	2010	J2 League	4	0	0	0	4	0
Career total			33	3	2	0	35	3
