= Hideyuki Ishida =

Japanese footballer

Personal information
- Full name: Hideyuki Ishida
- Date of birth: April 15, 1982 (age 44)
- Place of birth: Kyoto, Japan
- Height: 1.69 m (5 ft 6 1/2 in)
- Position: Forward

Youth career
- 2001–2004: Ritsumeikan University

Senior career*
Years	Team	Apps	(Gls)
2005–2006	Sagawa Printing	36	(5)
2007–2010	Kataller Toyama	119	(41)
2011–2013	Kamatamare Sanuki	83	(19)
Total		238	(65)
- * Club domestic league appearances and goals

Hideyuki Ishida (石田 英之, Ishida Hideyuki; born April 15, 1982) is a former Japanese football player.

== Club statistics ==
Club performance			League		Cup		Total	
Season	Club	League	Apps	Goals	Apps	Goals	Apps	Goals
Japan			League		Emperor's Cup		Total	
2005	Sagawa Printing	Football League	18	1	1	0	19	1
2006	Sagawa Printing	Football League	18	4	-		18	4
2007	ALO'S Hokuriku	Football League	33	17	2	0	35	17
2008	Kataller Toyama	Football League	27	12	2	1	29	13
2009	Kataller Toyama	J2 League	33	9	2	0	35	9
2010	Kataller Toyama	J2 League	26	3	1	0	27	3
Country	Japan		155	46	8	1	163	47
Total			155	46	8	1	163	47
