= Sho Hanai =

Japanese footballer

Sho Hanai 花井 聖
Personal information
- Full name: Sho Hanai
- Date of birth: 10 November 1989 (age 37)
- Place of birth: Miyoshi, Aichi, Japan
- Height: 1.79 m (5 ft 10 in)
- Position: Midfielder

Team information
- Current team: Kataller Toyama
- Number: 10

Youth career
- 1995–2007: Nagoya Grampus Eight Youth

Senior career*
Years	Team	Apps	(Gls)
2008–2011	Nagoya Grampus	7	(0)
2012–2014	Tokushima Vortis	49	(1)
2015	V-Varen Nagasaki	23	(1)
2016–2018	Giravanz Kitakyushu	41	(7)
2019–	Kataller Toyama	34	(5)
Medal record
Nagoya Grampus
Winner	J1 League	2010
Runner-up	J1 League	2011
Runner-up	Emperor's Cup	2009
- * Club domestic league appearances and goals as of 23 February 2020

Sho Hanai (花井 聖, Hanai Shō; born 10 November 1989) is a Japanese footballer who plays for Kataller Toyama.

== Career ==
Born in Miyoshi, Aichi, Hanai attended Miyoshi-Kita junior high school and Toyota-Otani high school in the same outer Nagoya area. He joined Nagoya Grampus Eight youth academy at the age of 7. He was promoted to Nagoya's top team in 2008.

Hanai joined Tokushima Vortis in February 2012 on a free transfer following his release from Nagoya. He made his debut in the 2–1 away win at Giravanz Kitakyushu in the next month, and scored his first goal for the club in Tokushima's 3–0 home win against Gainare Tottori on 20 May 2012.

== Club statistics ==
Updated to 23 February 2020.

Club performance			League		Cup		League Cup		Continental		Total	
Season	Club	League	Apps	Goals	Apps	Goals	Apps	Goals	Apps	Goals	Apps	Goals
Japan			League		Emperor's Cup		J. League Cup		AFC		Total	
2008	Nagoya Grampus	J1 League	4	0	1	0	1	0	-		6	0
2009	Nagoya Grampus	J1 League	2	0	1	0	0	0	3	0	6	0
2010	Nagoya Grampus	J1 League	0	0	3	1	4	0	-		7	1
2011	Nagoya Grampus	J1 League	1	0	0	0	0	0	1	0	2	0
2012	Tokushima Vortis	J2 League	31	1	1	0	-		-		32	1
2013	Tokushima Vortis	J2 League	13	0	1	0	-		-		14	0
2014	Tokushima Vortis	J2 League	5	0	2	0	3	0	-		10	0
2015	V-Varen Nagasaki	J2 League	23	1	0	0	-		-		23	1
2016	Giravanz Kitakyushu	J2 League	12	0	0	0	-		-		12	0
2017	Giravanz Kitakyushu	J3 League	29	7	1	3	-		-		30	10
2018	Giravanz Kitakyushu	J3 League	7	0	-		-		-		7	0
2019	Kataller Toyama	J3 League	34	5	1	0	-		-		35	5
Total			161	14	11	4	8	0	4	0	184	18
