= Makito Yoshida =

Japanese footballer

Makito Yoshida 吉田 眞紀人
Personal information
- Full name: Makito Yoshida
- Date of birth: 20 October 1992 (age 34)
- Place of birth: Chiba, Japan
- Height: 1.80 m (5 ft 11 in)
- Position: Forward

Team information
- Current team: Ehime FC
- Number: 14

Youth career
- 2008–2010: RKU

Senior career*
Years	Team	Apps	(Gls)
2011–2014	Nagoya Grampus	7	(0)
2013	→ Matsumoto Yamaga FC (loan)	1	(0)
2014	→ Mito HollyHock (loan)	31	(11)
2015	Mito HollyHock	29	(4)
2016–2019	JEF United Chiba	28	(3)
2017	→ FC Machida Zelvia (loan)	28	(3)
2018–2019	→ Ehime FC (loan)	37	(3)
2020–	Ehime FC	18	(32)
Medal record
Nagoya Grampus
Runner-up	J1 League	2011
- * Club domestic league appearances and goals as of 1 January 2019

Makito Yoshida (吉田 眞紀人, Yoshida Makito; born 20 October 1992) is a Japanese football player for Ehime FC.

== Career statistics ==
Updated to 6 January 2018.

Appearances and goals by club, season and competition
Club	Season	League		Cup^{1}		League Cup^{2}		Continental^{3}		Total	
Club	Season	Apps	Goals	Apps	Goals	Apps	Goals	Apps	Goals	Apps	Goals
Nagoya Grampus	2011	5	0	2	0	0	0	5	0	12	0
Nagoya Grampus	2012	2	0	0	0	1	1	1	0	4	1
Matsumoto Yamaga FC	2013	1	0	—		—		—		1	0
Mito HollyHock	2014	31	11	—		—		—		31	11
Mito HollyHock	2015	29	4	1	0	—		—		30	4
JEF United Chiba	2016	27	3	1	0	—		—		28	3
JEF United Chiba	2017	1	0	—		—		—		1	0
FC Machida Zelvia	2017	28	3	1	0	—		—		29	3
Total		124	21	5	0	1	1	6	0	136	22

^{1}Includes Emperor's Cup.

^{2}Includes J. League Cup.

^{3}Includes AFC Champions League.
