= Takahiro Masukawa =

Japanese footballer

Takahiro Masukawa 増川 隆洋
Personal information
- Full name: Takahiro Masukawa
- Date of birth: November 8, 1979 (age 46)
- Place of birth: Himeji, Hyogo, Japan
- Height: 1.91 m (6 ft 3 in)
- Position: Defender

Youth career
- 1995–1997: Kotogaoka High School

College career
Years	Team	Apps	(Gls)
1998–2001	Osaka University of Commerce		

Senior career*
Years	Team	Apps	(Gls)
2003–2004	Avispa Fukuoka	54	(4)
2005–2013	Nagoya Grampus	240	(10)
2014–2015	Vissel Kobe	48	(1)
2016–2017	Hokkaido Consadole Sapporo	34	(1)
2018–2019	Kyoto Sanga FC	23	(1)
Total		399	(17)
Medal record
Nagoya Grampus
Winner	J1 League	2010
Runner-up	J1 League	2011
Runner-up	Emperor's Cup	2009
- * Club domestic league appearances and goals as of end of 2018 season

Takahiro Masukawa (増川 隆洋, Masukawa Takahiro; born 8 November 1979) is a Japanese former professional footballer who played almost 500 games in a 17-year career. He most notably played for Nagoya Grampus, making over 250 appearances for the club between 2005 and 2013 and was part of the 2010 side that won the J1 League title. Additionally, Masukawa was named in 2010 J.League Team of the Year. He also played for Avispa Fukuoka, Vissel Kobe, Hokkaido Consadole Sapporo and Kyoto Sanga FC before announcing his retirement in 2021.

== Club statistics ==
Appearances and goals by club, season and competition
Club performance			League		Cup		League Cup		Continental		Other		Total	
Season	Club	League	Apps	Goals	Apps	Goals	Apps	Goals	Apps	Goals	Apps	Goals	Apps	Goals
Japan			League		Emperor's Cup		J.League Cup		AFC		Other		Total	
2003	Avispa Fukuoka	J2 League	11	0	3	1	-		-		-		14	1
2004	Avispa Fukuoka	J2 League	43	4	2	1	-		-		2 (Note: Appearances in J1/J2 play-offs)	0	47	5
2005	Nagoya Grampus	J1 League	22	0	0	0	6	0	-		-		28	0
2006	Nagoya Grampus	J1 League	23	0	2	0	5	1	-		-		30	1
2007	Nagoya Grampus	J1 League	15	2	0	0	2	0	-		-		17	2
2008	Nagoya Grampus	J1 League	27	2	2	0	9	1	-		-		38	3
2009	Nagoya Grampus	J1 League	27	0	4	0	1	0	8	0	-		40	0
2010	Nagoya Grampus	J1 League	32	1	2	0	4	0	-	-	-		38	1
2011	Nagoya Grampus	J1 League	33	1	3	1	2	0	6	0	1 (Note: Appearance in Japanese Super Cup)	1	45	3
2012	Nagoya Grampus	J1 League	33	1	4	1	2	0	5	0	-		44	2
2013	Nagoya Grampus	J1 League	28	3	1	0	6	0	-		-		35	3
2014	Vissel Kobe	J1 League	31	0	1	0	4	0	-		-		36	0
2015	Vissel Kobe	J1 League	17	1	0	0	6	0	-		-		23	1
2016	Hokkaido Consadole Sapporo	J2 League	33	1	0	0	-		-		-		33	1
2017	Hokkaido Consadole Sapporo	J1 League	1	0	0	0	0	0	-		-		1	0
2018	Kyoto Sanga FC	J2 League	23	1	0	0	-		-		-		23	1
Career total			399	17	24	4	47	2	19	0	3	1	492	24

== Honours ==
=== Individual ===
- J.League Best Eleven - 2010

=== Club ===
Nagoya Grampus

- J1 League - 2010
- Japanese Super Cup - 2011

Hokkaido Consadole Sapporo

- J2 League - 2016
