= Igor Burzanović =

Montenegrin footballer

Personal information
- Date of birth: 25 August 1985 (age 41)
- Place of birth: Titograd, SR Montenegro, SFR Yugoslavia
- Height: 1.78 m (5 ft 10 in)
- Position: Attacking midfielder

Youth career
- Budućnost Podgorica

Senior career*
Years	Team	Apps	(Gls)
2002–2006	Budućnost Podgorica	122	(62)
2007–2009	Red Star Belgrade	50	(11)
2009	→ Budućnost Podgorica (loan)	15	(10)
2009–2011	Nagoya Grampus	62	(10)
2012–2013	Buriram United	20	(3)
2013–2014	Budućnost Podgorica	12	(2)
2014	Irtysh	26	(4)
2015	Hunan Billows	27	(3)
2016	Budućnost Podgorica	5	(1)
2017–2018	Petrovac	13	(3)
2018–2019	Iskra Danilovgrad	16	(1)
Total		368	(110)

International career
2003–2004	Serbia and Montenegro U19	5	(2)
2004–2005	Serbia and Montenegro U21	3	(0)
2005	Serbia and Montenegro	1	(0)
2007–2008	Montenegro	8	(2)
- * Club domestic league appearances and goals

Igor Burzanović (Serbian Cyrillic: Игор Бурзановић; born 25 August 1985) is a retired Montenegrin international footballer.

== Club career ==
He was a member of FK Budućnost Podgorica since he started playing first team football. In following years Burzanović was the star player on the team. He was considered one of the most promising Montenegrin players.

Burzanović signed for Serbian giants Red Star Belgrade from FK Budućnost Podgorica in December 2006, joining the team on 8 January 2007. He has since then been a valuable member of the team. In 2009 Igor returned to his first club FK Budućnost Podgorica. After scoring 10 goals there, he moved to Japan to play for Nagoya Grampus.

In August 2012, Burzanović signed for Buriram United for a trial period which ended quickly. In August 2013, he signed again for Buducnost Podgorica.

In February 2014, Burzanović signed for Kazakhstan Premier League side FC Irtysh Pavlodar, leaving the club in December of the same year after one season.

On 30 January 2015, Burzanović transferred to China League One side Hunan Billows. In February 2016, Burzanović once again returned to his boyhood club Budućnost, signing a contract until the end of season.

== International career ==
As early as 2002, he was part of the FR Yugoslavia U-17 team at the 2002 UEFA European Under-17 Football Championship.

Burzanović was a constant member of Serbia and Montenegro national under-21 football team. On 8 June 2005, Burzanović earned his first and only cap for Serbia and Montenegro as a substitute for Miloš Marić in the third minute of second-half stoppage time against Italy. The friendly match, which took place in the Canadian city of Toronto, finished as a 1–1 draw. When the state-union of Serbia and Montenegro was dissolved in May 2006, Burzanović opted to represent his native Montenegro on the international scene, and played in the first match of the Montenegro national football team in 2007, where he scored the game-winning goal from a penalty shot in a 2–1 victory over Hungary.

He was officially acknowledged as Montenegro's best player and received the award in 2004.

== Career statistics ==
As of 15 April 2020

Club performance			League		Cup		League Cup		Continental		Total	
Season	Club	League	Apps	Goals	Apps	Goals	Apps	Goals	Apps	Goals	Apps	Goals
2002–03	Budućnost Podgorica	SCG Second League	26	17	0	0	-		-		26	17
2003–04	Budućnost Podgorica	SCG Second League	28	17	0	0	-		-		28	17
2004–05	Budućnost Podgorica	SCG First League	26	8	1	0	0	0	0	0	27	8
2005–06	Budućnost Podgorica	SCG First League	27	9	1	0	0	0	3	0	31	9
2006–07	Budućnost Podgorica	1. CFL	15	11	2	2	-		-		17	13
2006–07	Red Star Belgrade	Serbian SuperLiga	13	3	2	0	-		-		15	3
2007–08	Red Star Belgrade	Serbian SuperLiga	25	8	2	1	0	0	4	1	31	10
2008–09	Red Star Belgrade	Serbian SuperLiga	12	0	1	0	0	0	2	1	15	1
2008–09	Budućnost Podgorica	1. CFL	15	10	0	0	0	0	0	0	15	10
2009	Nagoya Grampus	J1 League	13	3	5	2	0	0	4	0	22	5
2010	Nagoya Grampus	J1 League	27	4	1	1	5	0	0	0	33	5
2011	Nagoya Grampus	J1 League	22	3	1	2	2	0	0	0	25	5
2013–14	Budućnost Podgorica	1. CFL	12	2	1	1	0	0	0	0	13	3
2014	Irtysh	Kazakhstan Premier League	26	4	2	2	-		-		28	6
2015	Hunan Billows	China League One	27	3	0	0	-		-		27	3
2015–16	Budućnost Podgorica	1. CFL	5	1	0	0	-		-		5	1
2016–17	Petrovac	1. CFL	13	3	0	0	-		-		13	3
2018–19	Iskra Danilovgrad	1. CFL	16	1	0	0	-		-		16	1
Total	Serbia and Montenegro		107	51	2	0	0	0	3	0	112	51
Total	Japan		62	10	7	5	7	0	4	0	80	15
Total	Montenegro		76	28	3	3	-		-		79	31
Total	Serbia		50	11	6	1	0	0	6	2	62	14
Total	Kazakhstan		26	4	2	2	-		-		28	6
Total	China PR		27	3	0	0	-		-		27	3
Career total			348	107	20	11	7	0	13	2	388	120

=== International goals ===
Scores and results list Montenegro's goal tally first.

#	Date	Venue	Opponent	Score	Result	Competition
1	24 March 2007	Podgorica City Stadium, Podgorica, Montenegro	Hungary	2-1	2-1	Friendly
2	26 March 2008	Podgorica City Stadium, Podgorica, Montenegro	Norway	1-0	3-1	Friendly
