= Miyazaki Sangyo-keiei University =

Coordinates: 31°53′02″N 131°24′18″E

Miyazaki Sangyo-keiei University (宮崎産業経営大学, Miyazaki sangyō keiei daigaku) is a private university in Miyazaki, Miyazaki, Japan. The predecessor of the school was founded in 1923, and it was chartered as a university in 1987.

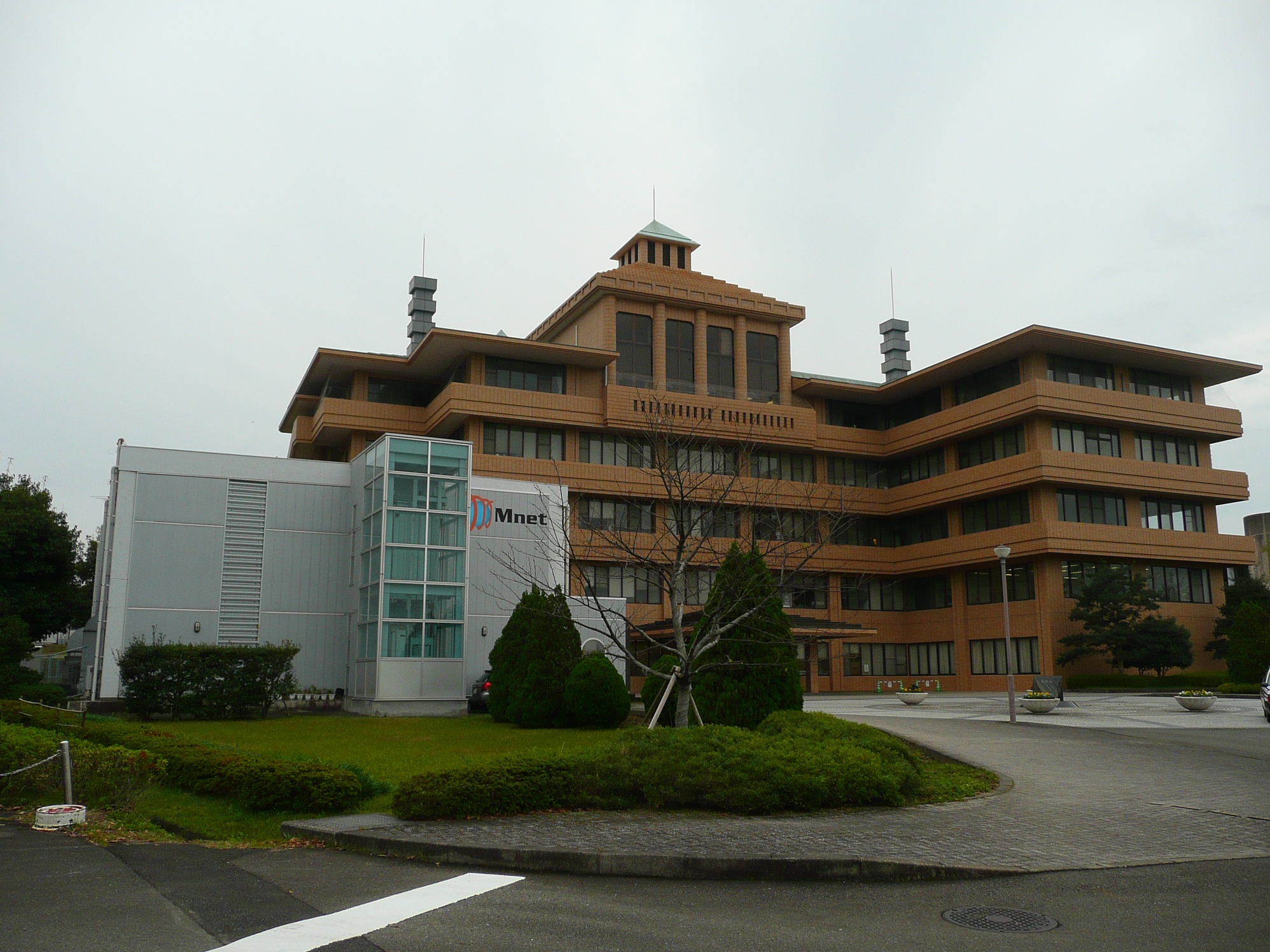
