= Jungo Fujimoto =

Japanese footballer (born 1984)

Jungo Fujimoto 藤本 淳吾
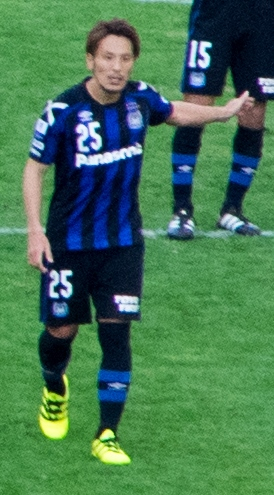

Personal information
- Full name: Jungo Fujimoto
- Date of birth: 24 March 1984 (age 42)
- Place of birth: Yamato, Kanagawa, Japan
- Height: 5 ft 8 in (1.73 m)
- Position: Midfielder

Youth career
- 1999–2001: Toko Gakuen High School

College career
Years	Team	Apps	(Gls)
2002–2005	University of Tsukuba		

Senior career*
Years	Team	Apps	(Gls)
2005–2010	Shimizu S-Pulse	139	(31)
2011–2013	Nagoya Grampus	94	(14)
2014–2015	Yokohama F. Marinos	45	(6)
2016–2019	Gamba Osaka	50	(3)
2016	→ Gamba Osaka U-23 (loan)	4	(2)
2019	→ Kyoto Sanga (loan)	8	(0)
2020–2022	SC Sagamihara	78	(11)

International career
2001	Japan U-17	3	(0)
2007–2012	Japan	13	(1)
Medal record
Shimizu S-Pulse
Runner-up	J.League Cup	2008
Runner-up	Emperor's Cup	2005
Runner-up	Emperor's Cup	2010
Nagoya Grampus
Runner-up	J1 League	2011
Gamba Osaka
Runner-up	J.League Cup	2016
Representing Japan
AFC Asian Cup
Gold medal – first place	2011 Qatar
- * Club domestic league appearances and goals as of 25 December 2022, 14:25 (UTC)

Jungo Fujimoto (藤本 淳吾, Fujimoto Jungo; born 24 March 1984) is a former Japanese football player.

He has played for Shimizu S-Pulse, Nagoya Grampus, Yokohama F. Marinos, Gamba Osaka, Kyoto Sanga, SC Sagamihara and the Japan national team. He is a left-footed play-making midfielder.

== Playing career ==
=== Early years ===
Fujimoto was educated at and played for Toko Gakuen High School, during which time he was also a member of the Japan national U-17 team for the 2001 FIFA U-17 World Championship hosted by Trinidad and Tobago. Fujimoto played three games in the competition but the team was eliminated after the group stage.

After graduating high school Fujimoto received an offer from J2 League side Kawasaki Frontale, but he decided to continue his studies and play football at the University of Tsukuba. He was a member of the national team for the 2005 Universiade held at İzmir, Turkey. Fujimoto was the top scorer with six goals and was selected as the MVP of the competition.

=== Club ===
Upon graduating university Fujimoto joined Shimizu S-Pulse in 2006 and inherited jersey number 10 from Masaaki Sawanobori. During his first full professional season Fujimoto played in 28 league games and scored 8 goals. He was awarded the J-League Young Player of the Year Award. He was seriously injured in late season of 2008 and made a comeback goal against Kyoto Sanga FC via direct free kick on 19 August 2009.

Fujimoto left Shizuoka in 2011 and moved west to join defending J.League champions Nagoya Grampus. He spent 3 seasons with Nagoya and scored 14 goals in 94 games as they finished 2nd, 7th and 10th in the league between 2011 and 2013.

2014 saw him join Yokohama F. Marinos where, now in his 30s, he found his playing time slightly curtailed, scoring 3 goals in 26 games in his first year and then playing only 19 times in his final year in Japan's second largest city, once again finding the back of the net 3 times.

He signed for Gamba Osaka ahead of the 2016 season and in his first 3 years at the club he was never able to establish himself as a first-team regular for any sustained period of time. He made just 13 league appearances in his first season with the men in blue and black, 14 the following year, before at the age of 34 playing 21 out of Gamba's 34 league games to help them to 9th in the final league standings.

On August 21, 2020 – after some months without football – he signed to join SC Sagamihara. On 27 December 2022, Fujimoto announced his retirement from football after a 16 years career as a professional.

=== National team ===
He made his Japan national team debut on 24 March 2007 in a 2-0 friendly victory at home to Peru. Fujimoto came on as a substitute in the 85th minute to replace his high school fellow alumnus Shunsuke Nakamura. His next international involvement came when he made brief second-half appearances in both matches in Japan's double header in June of that year, the 2-0 win over Montenegro and the 0-0 draw with Colombia. He played once more in 2007 as a 73rd minute replacement in the 4-1 home routing of Egypt.

It would be almost 3 years before he next pulled in the blue of Japan in their September 2010 home friendly wins over Paraguay and Guatemala, he was once again a substitute in both games.

Following his transfer from S-Pulse to Nagoya Grampus he was named in Japan's squad for their victorious 2011 AFC Asian Cup campaign. He came on as a substitute in the final minute of their draw with Jordan in the group stage before earning his first international start in the final of the competition against Australia, a match Japan won 1-0 after extra time.

It would be another 9 months before his next international involvement and he again made the starting line up and this time played his first full 90 minutes for Japan in a 1-0 friendly win at home to Vietnam on 7 October 2011, before playing the final 13 minutes of an 8-0 World Cup qualifying victory over Tajikistan 4 days later.

2012 would be his final year to earn international caps. He started and scored his sole international goal in a 3-1 win over Iceland in a home friendly on 24 February before again starting in the surprise 1-0 world cup qualifying defeat to Uzbekistan 5 days later. His last appearance for the Samurai Blue came in a 1-1 draw in a friendly at home to Venezuela on 15 August where he played the final 16 minutes.

== Club statistics ==
As of the end 2022 season

Club performance			League		Cup		League Cup		Continental		Other^{1}		Total	
Season	Club	League	Apps	Goals	Apps	Goals	Apps	Goals	Apps	Goals	Apps	Goals	Apps	Goals
Japan			League		Emperor's Cup		J. League Cup		Asia				Total	
2005	Shimizu S-Pulse	J1	0	0	-		1	0	-		-		1	0
2006	Shimizu S-Pulse	J1	28	8	3	3	5	0	-		-		36	11
2007	Shimizu S-Pulse	J1	34	7	3	0	4	1	-		-		41	8
2008	Shimizu S-Pulse	J1	18	2	-		6	4	-		-		24	6
2009	Shimizu S-Pulse	J1	27	1	5	0	9	0	-		-		41	1
2010	Shimizu S-Pulse	J1	32	13	4	1	8	1	-		-		44	15
Total			139	31	15	4	33	6	0	0	0	0	187	41
2011	Nagoya Grampus	J1	33	9	3	0	-		7	3	1	0	44	12
2012	Nagoya Grampus	J1	33	2	4	0	2	2	5	2	-		44	6
2013	Nagoya Grampus	J1	28	3	1	0	2	0	-		-		31	3
Total			94	14	8	0	4	2	12	5	1	0	119	21
2014	Yokohama F. Marinos	J1	26	3	1	2	2	0	4	0	1	0	34	5
2015	Yokohama F. Marinos	J1	19	3	3	0	3	0	-		-		25	3
Total			45	6	4	2	5	0	4	0	1	0	59	8
2016	Gamba Osaka	J1	13	0	1	0	5	0	4	0	1	0	24	0
2017	Gamba Osaka	J1	14	1	2	0	0	0	3	0	-		19	1
2018	Gamba Osaka	J1	21	2	1	0	6	0	-		-		28	2
2019	Gamba Osaka	J1	2	0	0	0	6	0	-		-		8	0
Total			50	3	4	0	17	0	7	0	1	0	79	3
2019	Kyoto Sanga	J2	8	0	-		-		-		-		8	0
Total			8	0	0	0	0	0	0	0	0	0	8	0
2020	SC Sagamihara	J3	15	0	1	0	0	0	0	0	0	0	24	0
2021	SC Sagamihara	J2	32	7	1	0	0	0	0	0	-		33	7
2022	SC Sagamihara	J3	31	4	0	0	0	0	-		-		31	4
Total			78	11	1	0	0	0	0	0	0	0	79	11
Career Total			414	65	32	6	59	8	23	5	3	0	531	84

^{1} - includes Japanese Super Cup appearances.

== Reserves performance ==
Club performance			League		Total	
Season	Club	League	Apps	Goals	Apps	Goals
Japan			League		Total	
2016	Gamba Osaka U-23	J3	4	2	4	2
Career total			4	2	4	2

== National team statistics ==
Last Update: 8 February 2019

Japan national team
Year	Apps	Goals
2007	4	0
2008	0	0
2009	0	0
2010	2	0
2011	4	0
2012	3	1
Total	13	1

== Trivia ==
His father Koju was also a footballer who played for Nippon Kokan of the Japan Soccer League, the former top-flight league in Japan.

== Honors and awards ==
=== Individual honors ===
- J. League Rookie of the Year: 2006
- J. League Best Eleven: 2010, 2011

=== International honors ===
- AFC Asian Cup: 2011
