= List of Nagoya Grampus records and statistics =

This article contains records and statistics for the Japanese professional football club, Nagoya Grampus.

== Key ==
- P = Played
- W = Games won
- D = Games drawn
- L = Games lost
- F = Goals for
- A = Goals against
- Pts = Points
- Pos = Final position
- J1 = J1 League
- J2 = J2 League
- F = Final
- Group = Group stage
- QF = Quarter-finals
- QR1 = First Qualifying Round
- QR2 = Second Qualifying Round
- QR3 = Third Qualifying Round
- QR4 = Fourth Qualifying Round
- RInt = Intermediate Round
- R1 = Round 1
- R2 = Round 2
- R3 = Round 3
- R4 = Round 4
- R5 = Round 5
- R6 = Round 6
- SF = Semi-finals

| Champions | Runners-up | Third place | Promoted | Relegated |

== Seasons ==
Results of league and cup competitions by season
| Season | Division | Pos | P | W | D | L | F | A | Pts | Emperor's Cup | J.League Cup | Super Cup | AFC | Name | Goals |
| Season | League | | | | | | | | | Emperor's Cup | J.League Cup | Super Cup | AFC | Top goalscorer | |
|---|---|---|---|---|---|---|---|---|---|---|---|---|---|---|---|
| 1992 | n/a | n/a | n/a | n/a | n/a | n/a | n/a | n/a | n/a | 1st round | SF | - | - | (Japan) Takafumi Ogura | 5 |
| 1993 | J1 | 9th | 36 | 12 | 0 | 24 | 48 | 66 | - | QF | GS | - | - | (Brazil) Jorginho | 10 |
| 1994 | J1 | 11th | 44 | 15 | 0 | 29 | 56 | 82 | - | R2 | R1 | - | - | (Japan) Yasuyuki Moriyama | 14 |
| 1995 | J1 | 3rd | 52 | 32 | 0 | 20 | 99 | 82 | 97 | Winners | Not Held | - | - | (Japan) Takafumi Ogura | 19 |
| 1996 | J1 | 2nd | 30 | 21 | 0 | 9 | 63 | 39 | 63 | R3 | GS | Winners | Cup Winners' Cup – Runners-up | (Socialist Federal Republic of Yugoslavia) Dragan Stojković | 16 |
| 1997 | J1 | 9th | 32 | 16 | 0 | 16 | 41 | 48 | 48 | R3 | SF | - | - | (Japan) Yasuyuki Moriyama | 10 |
| 1998 | J1 | 5th | 34 | 23 | 0 | 11 | 71 | 47 | 63 | SF | GS | - | - | (Japan) Kenji Fukuda | 18 |
| 1999 | J1 | 4th | 30 | 18 | 2 | 10 | 62 | 46 | 54 | Winners | SF | - | - | (Japan) Wagner Lopes | 19 |
| 2000 | J1 | 9th | 30 | 14 | 2 | 14 | 42 | 45 | 41 | R4 | SF | Runners-up | Cup Winners' Cup – QF | (Japan) Wagner Lopes | 11 |
| 2001 | J1 | 5th | 30 | 17 | 3 | 9 | 56 | 45 | 49 | R3 | SF | - | - | (Brazil) Ueslei | 24 |
| 2002 | J1 | 6th | 30 | 15 | 1 | 14 | 49 | 41 | 45 | QF | GS | - | - | (Brazil) Ueslei | 24 |
| 2003 | J1 | 7th | 30 | 11 | 12 | 7 | 49 | 42 | 45 | R4 | QF | - | - | (Brazil) Ueslei | 25 |
| 2004 | J1 | 7th | 30 | 12 | 8 | 10 | 49 | 43 | 44 | R5 | SF | - | - | (Brazil) Marques | 23 |
| 2005 | J1 | 14th | 34 | 10 | 9 | 15 | 43 | 49 | 39 | R5 | GS | - | - | (Japan) Naoshi Nakamura | 8 |
| 2006 | J1 | 7th | 34 | 13 | 9 | 12 | 51 | 49 | 48 | R5 | GS | - | - | (Norway) Frode Johnsen | 12 |
| 2007 | J1 | 11th | 30 | 12 | 8 | 10 | 49 | 43 | 44 | R5 | GS | - | - | (Norway) Frode Johnsen | 14 |
| 2008 | J1 | 3rd | 34 | 17 | 8 | 9 | 48 | 35 | 59 | QF | SF | - | - | (Norway) Frode Johnsen | 16 |
| 2009 | J1 | 9th | 34 | 14 | 8 | 12 | 46 | 42 | 50 | Runners-up | QF | - | Champions League – SF | (Australia) Joshua Kennedy (Brazil) Davi | 12 |
| 2010 | J1 | 1st | 34 | 23 | 3 | 8 | 54 | 37 | 72 | QF | GS | - | - | (Australia) Joshua Kennedy | 18 |
| 2011 | J1 | 7th | 34 | 12 | 8 | 10 | 49 | 43 | 44 | QF | SF | - | Champions League – L16 | (Australia) Joshua Kennedy | 19 |
| 2012 | J1 | 2nd | 34 | 21 | 8 | 5 | 67 | 36 | 71 | QF | QF | - | Champions League – L16 | (Japan) Tulio | 16 |
| 2013 | J1 | 11th | 34 | 13 | 8 | 13 | 47 | 48 | 47 | R2 | GS | - | - | (Australia) Joshua Kennedy | 12 |
| 2014 | J1 | 10th | 34 | 13 | 9 | 12 | 47 | 48 | 48 | QF | GS | - | - | (Japan) Kensuke Nagai | 19 |
| 2015 | J1 | 9th | 34 | 13 | 7 | 14 | 44 | 48 | 46 | R2 | GS | - | - | (Japan) Kengo Kawamata | 11 |
| 2016 | J1 | 16th | 34 | 7 | 9 | 18 | 38 | 58 | 30 | R2 | QF | - | - | (Sweden) Robin Simović | 11 |
| 2017 | J2 | 3rd | 42 | 23 | 6 | 13 | 85 | 65 | 75 | R4 | - | - | - | (Sweden) Robin Simović | 21 |
| 2018 | J1 | 15th | 34 | 12 | 5 | 17 | 52 | 59 | 41 | R3 | GS | - | - | (Brazil) Jô | 24 |
| 2019 | J1 | 13th | 34 | 9 | 10 | 15 | 45 | 50 | 37 | R2 | QF | - | - | (Japan) Naoki Maeda | 8 |
| 2020 | J1 | 3rd | 34 | 19 | 6 | 9 | 45 | 28 | 63 | - | QF | - | - | (Brazil) Mateus | 9 |
| 2021 | J1 | 5th | 34 | 19 | 6 | 9 | 45 | 28 | 63 | QF | Winners | - | - | (Brazil) Mateus | 7 |
| 2022 | J1 | 8th | 34 | 11 | 13 | 10 | 30 | 35 | 46 | R16 | QF | - | - | (Brazil) Mateus | 8 |
| 2023 | J1 | 6th | 38 | 14 | 10 | 10 | 41 | 36 | 52 | QF | SF | | | (Denmark) Junker Kasper | 16 |
| 2024 | J1 | 11th | 38 | 15 | 5 | 18 | 44 | 47 | 50 | R2 | Winners | | | | |
| 2025 | J1 | 16th | 38 | 11 | 10 | 17 | 44 | 56 | 43 | R4 | R2 | | | Sho Inagaki | 11 |
| 2026 | J1 | TBD | 18 | | | | | | | | | | | | |
| 2026-27 | J1 | TBD | 38 | | | | | | | | | | | | |

=== AFC history ===
As of match played 29 May 2012

| Competition | P | W | D | L | GF | GA |
|---|---|---|---|---|---|---|
| Cup Winners' Cup | 10 | 5 | 4 | 1 | 21 | 8 |
| Champions League | 25 | 10 | 8 | 7 | 38 | 29 |
| Total | 35 | 15 | 12 | 8 | 59 | 37 |

| Season | Competition | Round | Club | Home | Away | Aggregate |
|---|---|---|---|---|---|---|
| 1996–97 | Cup Winners' Cup | Second round | (Vietnam) Hải Phòng | 3–0 | 1–1 | 4–1 |
| 1996–97 | Cup Winners' Cup | Quarterfinals | (Hong Kong) South China | 2–0 | 2–2 | 4–2 |
| 1996–97 | Cup Winners' Cup | Semifinals | (South Korea) Ulsan Hyundai Horang-i | 5–0 | | |
| 1996–97 | Cup Winners' Cup | Final | (Saudi Arabia) Al-Hilal | 1–3 | | |
| 2000–01 | Cup Winners' Cup | Second round | (Hong Kong) Happy Valley | 3–1 | 3–0 | 6–1 |
| 2000–01 | Cup Winners' Cup | Quarterfinals | (China) Dalian Shide | 0–0 | 1–1 | 1–1(a) |
| 2009 | Champions League | Group E | (Australia) Newcastle Jets | 1–1 | 0–1 | 1st |
| 2009 | Champions League | Group E | (South Korea) Ulsan Hyundai Horang-i | 4–1 | 3–1 | 1st |
| 2009 | Champions League | Group E | (China) Beijing Guoan | 0–0 | 1–1 | 1st |
| 2009 | Champions League | Round of 16 | (South Korea) Suwon Bluewings | 2–1 | | |
| 2009 | Champions League | Quarterfinal | (Japan) Kawasaki Frontale | 3–1 | 1–2 | 4–3 |
| 2009 | Champions League | Semifinal | (Saudi Arabia) Al-Ittihad | 1–2 | 2–6 | 3–8 |
| 2011 | Champions League | Group F | (South Korea) Seoul | 1–1 | 2–0 | 2nd |
| 2011 | Champions League | Group F | (United Arab Emirates) Al Ain | 4–0 | 1–3 | 2nd |
| 2011 | Champions League | Group F | (China) Hangzhou Greentown | 1–0 | 0–2 | 2nd |
| 2011 | Champions League | Round of 16 | (South Korea) Suwon Bluewings | 0–2 | | |
| 2012 | Champions League | Group G | (South Korea) Seongnam Ilhwa Chunma | 2–2 | 1–1 | 2nd |
| 2012 | Champions League | Group G | (Australia) Central Coast Mariners | 3–0 | 1–1 | 2nd |
| 2012 | Champions League | Group G | (China) Tianjin Teda | 0–0 | 3–0 | 2nd |
| 2012 | Champions League | Round of 16 | (Australia) Adelaide United | 0–1 | | |
