= 2007 Nagoya Grampus Eight season =

Nagoya Grampus Eight
2007 season
- Chairman: Toyo Kato
- Manager: Sef Vergoossen
- Stadium: Mizuho Athletic Stadium
- J. League 1: 11th
- Emperor's Cup: 5th Round
- J. League Cup: Group stage
- Top goalscorer: Frode Johnsen (13)

The 2008 Nagoya Grampus season was Nagoya Grampus' 15th season in the J. League Division 1 and 26th overall in the Japanese top flight. They also participated in the 2007 J. League Cup, being knocked out at the group stage, and the 2008 Emperor's Cup, where they reached the Fifth Round before defeat to Honda F.C.

== Squad ==
Note: Flags indicate national team as defined under FIFA eligibility rules; some limited exceptions apply. Players may hold more than one non-FIFA nationality.

No.	Pos.	Nation	Player
1	GK	JPN	Seigo Narazaki
3	DF	SVK	Marek Špilár
4	DF	JPN	Masayuki Omori
5	DF	JPN	Atsushi Yoneyama
7	MF	JPN	Naoshi Nakamura
8	MF	KOR	Kim Jung-Woo
9	FW	NOR	Frode Johnsen
10	MF	JPN	Toshiya Fujita
11	FW	JPN	Keiji Tamada
13	MF	JPN	Kei Yamaguchi
14	MF	JPN	Keiji Yoshimura
15	FW	JPN	Sho Kamogawa
16	DF	JPN	Takahiro Masukawa
17	DF	JPN	Yuki Maki
18	MF	JPN	Shunichi Nakajima
19	FW	JPN	Keita Sugimoto
20	DF	JPN	Seiji Kaneko
21	GK	JPN	Ryo Kushino
22	DF	JPN	Kazuto Tsuyuki

No.	Pos.	Nation	Player
24	MF	JPN	Keisuke Honda
25	MF	JPN	Yusuke Sudo
26	FW	JPN	Tomohiro Tsuda
27	DF	JPN	Shosuke Katayama
28	MF	JPN	Keiji Watanabe
29	MF	JPN	Yoshizumi Ogawa
30	DF	JPN	Akira Takeuchi
31	DF	JPN	Shohei Abe
32	DF	JPN	Jun Aoyama
33	MF	JPN	Shingo Wada
34	MF	JPN	Maya Yoshida
35	MF	JPN	Wataru Inoue
36	GK	JPN	Kouichi Hirono
37	GK	JPN	Toru Hasegawa
38	FW	JPN	Oribe Niikawa
39	MF	JPN	Shinta Fukushima
40	MF	JPN	Sho Hanai
41	FW	JPN	koji Hashimoto

== Transfers ==
=== Winter ===
In: Note: Flags indicate national team as defined under FIFA eligibility rules; some limited exceptions apply. Players may hold more than one non-FIFA nationality.

No.	Pos.	Nation	Player
17	FW	JPN	Yuki Maki (from (Japan) Komazawa University)
21	GK	JPN	Ryo Kushino (loan from (Japan) JEF United Chiba)
22	DF	JPN	Kazuto Tsuyuki (from (Japan) Komazawa University)
29	MF	JPN	Yoshizumi Ogawa (from (Japan) Meiji University)

Out: Note: Flags indicate national team as defined under FIFA eligibility rules; some limited exceptions apply. Players may hold more than one non-FIFA nationality.

No.	Pos.	Nation	Player
2	DF	JPN	Yutaka Akita (to (Japan) Kyoto Sanga)
5	DF	JPN	Masahiro Koga (to (Japan) Kashiwa Reysol)
21	GK	JPN	Riki Takasaki (retired)
22	GK	JPN	Eiji Kawashima (to (Japan) Kawasaki Frontale)
23	FW	JPN	Yohei Toyoda (loan to (Japan) Montedio Yamagata)
38	MF	JPN	Ryota Takahashi (to (Japan) Kariya)

=== Summer ===
In: Note: Flags indicate national team as defined under FIFA eligibility rules; some limited exceptions apply. Players may hold more than one non-FIFA nationality.

No.	Pos.	Nation	Player
20	DF	JPN	Seiji Kaneko (loan rom (Japan) Kashima Antlers)

Out: Note: Flags indicate national team as defined under FIFA eligibility rules; some limited exceptions apply. Players may hold more than one non-FIFA nationality.

No.	Pos.	Nation	Player

== Competitions ==
=== J. League ===
==== Results ====
3 March 2007 1	Nagoya Grampus	2 – 0	JEF United Chiba	Nagoya
16:04 JST (UTC+9)	Kim 76'; Honda 89'	Summary		Stadium: Mizuho Athletic Stadium; Attendance: 18,410

10 March 2007 2	Ventforet Kofu	0 – 2	Nagoya Grampus	Kōfu
14:05 JST (UTC+9)		Summary	Kim 50'; Tamada 79'	Stadium: Yamanashi Chuo Bank Stadium; Attendance: 11,791

18 March 2007 3	Nagoya Grampus	2 – 0	Albirex Niigata	Nagoya
14:03 JST (UTC+9)	Johnsen 33'; Kim 69'	Summary		Stadium: Mizuho Athletic Stadium; Attendance: 11,620

1 April 2007 4	Yokohama F. Marinos	1 – 2	Nagoya Grampus	Yokohama
14:00 JST (UTC+9)	Namba 62'	Summary	Sugimoto 64'; Yamaguchi 66'	Stadium: International Stadium Yokohama; Attendance: 10,225

7 April 2007 5	Nagoya Grampus	2 – 3	Sanfrecce Hiroshima	Toyota
14:03 JST (UTC+9)	Yamaguchi 22'; Masukawa 62'	Summary	Ueslei 24', 77' (pen.); Satō 72'	Stadium: Toyota Stadium; Attendance: 16,825

14 April 2007 6	Omiya Ardija	1 – 0	Nagoya Grampus	Ōmiya-ku
13:00 JST (UTC+9)	Salles 26'	Summary		Stadium: NACK5 Stadium Omiya; Attendance: 6,584

21 April 2007 7	Nagoya Grampus	2 – 0	Albirex Niigata	Nagoya
14:03 JST (UTC+9)	Johnsen 33'; Kim 69'	Summary		Stadium: Mizuho Athletic Stadium; Attendance: 11,620

Match	Date	Venue	Opponents	Score
8	2007..			-
9	2007..			-
10	2007..			-
11	2007..			-
12	2007..			-
13	2007..			-
14	2007..			-
15	2007..			-
16	2007..			-
17	2007..			-
18	2007..			-
19	2007..			-
20	2007..			-
21	2007..			-
22	2007..			-
23	2007..			-
24	2007..			-
25	2007..			-
26	2007..			-
27	2007..			-
28	2007..			-
29	2007..			-
30	2007..			-
31	2007..			-
32	2007..			-
33	2007..			-
34	2007..			-

==== Table ====
Pos	Team	Pld	W	D	L	GF	GA	GD	Pts
9	Júbilo Iwata	34	15	4	15	54	55	−1	49
10	Vissel Kobe	34	13	8	13	58	48	+10	47
11	Nagoya Grampus Eight	34	13	6	15	43	45	−2	45
12	FC Tokyo	34	14	3	17	49	58	−9	45
13	JEF United Chiba	34	12	6	16	51	56	−5	42

Updated to match(es) played on December 1, 2007. Source: J. League Division 1
Rules for classification: 1) points; 2) goal difference; 3) number of goals scored.

=== Emperor's Cup ===
4 November 2007 Fourth round	Nagoya Grampus	3 – 1	Thespa Kusatsu	Nagoya
JST (UTC+9)				Stadium: Mizuho Athletic Stadium; Attendance: 3,522

8 December 2007 Fifth round	Honda F.C.	2 – 0	Nagoya Grampus Eight	Matsue
13:00 JST (UTC+9)				Stadium: Matsue Stadium; Attendance: 3,755

=== J. League Cup ===
==== Group stage ====
Team	Pld	W	D	L	GF	GA	GD	Pts
Kashima Antlers	6	4	0	2	12	7	+5	12
Ventforet Kofu	6	3	1	2	5	6	−1	10
Albirex Niigata	6	2	3	1	8	6	+2	9
Nagoya Grampus Eight	6	0	2	4	5	11	−6	2

21 March 2007 1	Ventforet Kofu	2 – 1	Nagoya Grampus Eight	Kōfu
JST (UTC+9)				Stadium: Yamanashi Chuo Bank Stadium; Attendance: 7,609

25 March 2007 2	Nagoya Grampus Eight	0 – 1	Ventforet Kofu	Toyota
JST (UTC+9)				Stadium: Toyota Stadium; Attendance: 4,476

4 April 2007 3	Nagoya Grampus Eight	2 – 2	Albirex Niigata	Toyota
JST (UTC+9)				Stadium: Toyota Stadium; Attendance: 3,740

11 April 2007 4	Kashima Antlers	2 – 1	Nagoya Grampus Eight	Kashima
JST (UTC+9)				Stadium: Kashima Soccer Stadium; Attendance: 4,138

9 May 2007 5	Nagoya Grampus Eight	1 – 4	Kashima Antlers	Toyota
JST (UTC+9)				Stadium: Toyota Stadium; Attendance: 3,858

23 May 2007 6	Albirex Niigata	0 – 0	Nagoya Grampus Eight	Niigata
JST (UTC+9)				Stadium: Denka Big Swan Stadium; Attendance: 28,660

== Player statistics ==
=== Appearances ===
No.	Pos.	Player	D.o.B. (Age)	Height / Weight	J. League 1		Emperor's Cup		J. League Cup		Total	
No.	Pos.	Player	D.o.B. (Age)	Height / Weight	Apps	Goals	Apps	Goals	Apps	Goals	Apps	Goals
1	GK	Seigo Narazaki	April 15, 1976 (aged 30)	cm / kg	29	0						
3	DF	Marek Špilár	February 11, 1975 (aged 32)	cm / kg	3	0						
4	DF	Masayuki Omori	November 9, 1976 (aged 30)	cm / kg	31	0						
5	DF	Atsushi Yoneyama	November 20, 1976 (aged 30)	cm / kg	21	0						
7	MF	Naoshi Nakamura	January 27, 1979 (aged 28)	cm / kg	26	0						
8	MF	Kim Jung-Woo	May 9, 1982 (aged 24)	cm / kg	27	4						
9	FW	Frode Johnsen	March 17, 1974 (aged 32)	cm / kg	26	13						
10	MF	Toshiya Fujita	October 4, 1971 (aged 35)	cm / kg	29	2						
11	FW	Keiji Tamada	April 11, 1980 (aged 26)	cm / kg	14	5						
13	MF	Kei Yamaguchi	June 11, 1983 (aged 23)	cm / kg	33	2						
14	MF	Keiji Yoshimura	August 8, 1979 (aged 27)	cm / kg	17	0						
15	FW	Sho Kamogawa	February 7, 1983 (aged 24)	cm / kg	0	0						
16	DF	Takahiro Masukawa	November 8, 1979 (aged 27)	cm / kg	15	2						
17	FW	Yuki Maki	June 26, 1984 (aged 22)	cm / kg	4	0						
18	MF	Shunichi Nakajima	June 16, 1982 (aged 24)	cm / kg	0	0						
19	FW	Keita Sugimoto	June 13, 1982 (aged 24)	cm / kg	34	7						
20	DF	Makoto Kakuda	July 10, 1983 (aged 23)	cm / kg	0	0						
20	DF	Seiji Kaneko	May 27, 1980 (aged 26)	cm / kg	0	0						
21	GK	Ryo Kushino	March 3, 1979 (aged 28)	cm / kg	6	0						
22	DF	Kazuto Tsuyuki	August 14, 1984 (aged 22)	cm / kg	0	0						
24	MF	Keisuke Honda	June 13, 1986 (aged 20)	cm / kg	30	3						
25	MF	Yusuke Sudo	May 7, 1986 (aged 20)	cm / kg	4	0						
26	FW	Tomohiro Tsuda	May 6, 1986 (aged 20)	cm / kg	17	2						
27	DF	Shosuke Katayama	September 8, 1983 (aged 23)	cm / kg	15	1						
28	DF	Keiji Watanabe	January 28, 1985 (aged 22)	cm / kg	13	0						
29	MF	Yoshizumi Ogawa	August 25, 1984 (aged 22)	cm / kg	11	2						
30	DF	Akira Takeuchi	June 18, 1983 (aged 23)	cm / kg	13	0						
31	DF	Shohei Abe	December 1, 1983 (aged 23)	cm / kg	27	0						
32	MF	Jun Aoyama	January 3, 1988 (aged 19)	cm / kg	0	0						
33	DF	Shingo Wada	August 7, 1987 (aged 19)	cm / kg	0	0						
34	DF	Maya Yoshida	August 24, 1988 (aged 18)	cm / kg	19	0						
35	MF	Wataru Inoue	August 7, 1986 (aged 20)	cm / kg	0	0						
36	GK	Koichi Hirono	April 16, 1980 (aged 26)	cm / kg	0	0						
37	GK	Toru Hasegawa	December 11, 1988 (aged 18)	cm / kg	0	0						
38	FW	Oribe Niikawa	July 16, 1988 (aged 18)	cm / kg	0	0						
39	MF	Shinta Fukushima	January 28, 1989 (aged 18)	cm / kg	0	0						
41	MF	Koji Hashimoto	April 22, 1986 (aged 20)	cm / kg	0	0						

=== Goal Scorers ===
Place	Position	Nation	Number	Name	J-League	J-League Cup	Emperor's Cup	Total
1	FW	(Norway)	9	Frode Johnsen	13	0	0	13
2	FW	(Japan)	19	Keita Sugimoto	7	0	0	7
3	FW	(Japan)	11	Keiji Tamada	5	0	0	5
4	MF	(South Korea)	8	Kim Jung-woo	4	0	0	4
5	MF	(Japan)	24	Keisuke Honda	3	0	0	3
6	MF	(Japan)	10	Toshiya Fujita	2	0	0	2
6	MF	(Japan)	13	Kei Yamaguchi	2	0	0	2
6	DF	(Japan)	16	Takahiro Masukawa	2	0	0	2
6	FW	(Japan)	26	Tomohiro Tsuda	2	0	0	2
6	MF	(Japan)	29	Yoshizumi Ogawa	2	0	0	2
11	DF	(Japan)	27	Shosuke Katayama	1	0	0	1
				TOTALS	43	5	3	51

== Other pages ==
- (in Japanese) J. League official site
