= 2006 Nagoya Grampus Eight season =

Nagoya Grampus Eight
2006 season
- Manager: Vergoossen
- Stadium: Mizuho Athletic Stadium
- J. League 1: 7th
- Emperor's Cup: 5th Round
- J. League Cup: GL-D 5th
- Top goalscorer: Johnsen (10)

2006 Nagoya Grampus Eight season

== Competitions ==
Competitions	Position
J. League 1	7th / 18 clubs
Emperor's Cup	5th Round
J. League Cup	GL-D 5th / 5 clubs

== Domestic results ==
=== J. League 1 ===
Match	Date	Venue	Opponents	Score
1	2006..			-
2	2006..			-
3	2006..			-
4	2006..			-
5	2006..			-
6	2006..			-
7	2006..			-
8	2006..			-
9	2006..			-
10	2006..			-
11	2006..			-
12	2006..			-
13	2006..			-
14	2006..			-
15	2006..			-
16	2006..			-
17	2006..			-
18	2006..			-
19	2006..			-
20	2006..			-
21	2006..			-
22	2006..			-
23	2006..			-
24	2006..			-
25	2006..			-
26	2006..			-
27	2006..			-
28	2006..			-
29	2006..			-
30	2006..			-
31	2006..			-
32	2006..			-
33	2006..			-
34	2006..			-

=== Emperor's Cup ===
Match	Date	Venue	Opponents	Score
4th Round	2006..			-
5th Round	2006..			-

=== J. League Cup ===
Match	Date	Venue	Opponents	Score
GL-D-1	2006..			-
GL-D-2	2006..			-
GL-D-3	2006..			-
GL-D-4	2006..			-
GL-D-5	2006..			-
GL-D-6	2006..			-

== Player statistics ==
No.	Pos.	Player	D.o.B. (Age)	Height / Weight	J. League 1		Emperor's Cup		J. League Cup		Total	
No.	Pos.	Player	D.o.B. (Age)	Height / Weight	Apps	Goals	Apps	Goals	Apps	Goals	Apps	Goals
1	GK	Seigo Narazaki	April 15, 1976 (aged 29)	cm / kg	24	0						
2	DF	Yutaka Akita	August 6, 1970 (aged 35)	cm / kg	12	2						
3	DF	Marek Špilár	February 11, 1975 (aged 31)	cm / kg	21	1						
4	DF	Masayuki Omori	November 9, 1976 (aged 29)	cm / kg	32	0						
5	DF	Masahiro Koga	September 8, 1978 (aged 27)	cm / kg	26	2						
6	DF	Koji Arimura	August 25, 1976 (aged 29)	cm / kg	8	0						
7	MF	Naoshi Nakamura	January 27, 1979 (aged 27)	cm / kg	33	5						
8	MF	Kim Jung-Woo	May 9, 1982 (aged 23)	cm / kg	25	3						
9	FW	Frode Johnsen	March 17, 1974 (aged 31)	cm / kg	17	10						
10	MF	Toshiya Fujita	October 4, 1971 (aged 34)	cm / kg	24	2						
11	FW	Keiji Tamada	April 11, 1980 (aged 25)	cm / kg	26	6						
13	MF	Kei Yamaguchi	June 11, 1983 (aged 22)	cm / kg	26	1						
14	MF	Keiji Yoshimura	August 8, 1979 (aged 26)	cm / kg	19	1						
15	FW	Sho Kamogawa	February 7, 1983 (aged 23)	cm / kg	2	0						
16	DF	Takahiro Masukawa	November 8, 1979 (aged 26)	cm / kg	23	0						
18	MF	Shunichi Nakajima	June 16, 1982 (aged 23)	cm / kg	0	0						
19	FW	Keita Sugimoto	June 13, 1982 (aged 23)	cm / kg	32	8						
20	DF	Makoto Kakuda	July 10, 1983 (aged 22)	cm / kg	3	0						
21	GK	Riki Takasaki	July 11, 1970 (aged 35)	cm / kg	0	0						
22	GK	Eiji Kawashima	March 20, 1983 (aged 22)	cm / kg	10	0						
23	FW	Yohei Toyoda	April 11, 1985 (aged 20)	cm / kg	9	1						
24	MF	Keisuke Honda	June 13, 1986 (aged 19)	cm / kg	29	6						
25	MF	Yusuke Sudo	May 7, 1986 (aged 19)	cm / kg	15	0						
26	MF	Kiyohiro Hirabayashi	June 4, 1984 (aged 21)	cm / kg	1	0						
27	DF	Shosuke Katayama	September 8, 1983 (aged 22)	cm / kg	9	0						
28	DF	Keiji Watanabe	January 28, 1985 (aged 21)	cm / kg	12	0						
29	DF	Kota Fukatsu	August 10, 1984 (aged 21)	cm / kg	3	0						
30	DF	Akira Takeuchi	June 18, 1983 (aged 22)	cm / kg	0	0						
31	DF	Shohei Abe	December 1, 1983 (aged 22)	cm / kg	9	0						
32	MF	Jun Aoyama	January 3, 1988 (aged 18)	cm / kg	1	0						
33	DF	Shingo Wada	August 7, 1987 (aged 18)	cm / kg	0	0						
34	GK	Tomoyasu Naito	September 11, 1986 (aged 19)	cm / kg	0	0						
35	MF	Wataru Inoue	August 7, 1986 (aged 19)	cm / kg	0	0						
37	FW	Tomohiro Tsuda	May 6, 1986 (aged 19)	cm / kg	14	3						
38	MF	Ryota Takahashi	December 28, 1986 (aged 19)	cm / kg	1	0						
39	MF	Koji Hashimoto	April 22, 1986 (aged 19)	cm / kg	1	0						

== Other pages ==
- (in Japanese) J. League official site
