= Kaimoto =

Kaimoto (written: 海本) is a Japanese surname. Notable people with the surname include:

- Keiji Kaimoto (海本 慶治, born 1972), Japanese footballer
- Kojiro Kaimoto (海本 幸治郎, born 1977), Japanese footballer
