= Seiji Honda =

Japanese footballer

Seiji Honda 本田 征治
Personal information
- Full name: Seiji Honda
- Date of birth: February 25, 1976 (age 50)
- Place of birth: Kitajima, Tokushima, Japan
- Height: 1.82 m (5 ft 11 1/2 in)
- Position: Goalkeeper

Youth career
- 1991–1993: Tokushima High School
- 1994: Chukyo University

Senior career*
Years	Team	Apps	(Gls)
1995–2004	Nagoya Grampus Eight	5	(0)
1999	→Bellmare Hiratsuka (loan)	19	(0)
2004–2006	Vissel Kobe	15	(0)
2007–2009	Thespa Kusatsu	96	(0)
Total		136	(0)

International career
1995	Japan U-20	2	(0)
Medal record
Nagoya Grampus Eight
Runner-up	J1 League	1996
Winner	Emperor's Cup	1995
- * Club domestic league appearances and goals

Seiji Honda (本田 征治, Honda Seiji; born February 25, 1976) is a former Japanese football player.

== Club career ==
Honda was born in Kitajima, Tokushima on February 25, 1976. After he dropped out of Chukyo University, he joined the Nagoya Grampus Eight in 1995. However he played less than Yuji Ito. He moved to the Bellmare Hiratsuka in 1999, and debuted at the club. He returned to Nagoya in 2000. However he played second to Japan national team goalkeeper Seigo Narazaki. He then moved to Vissel Kobe in August 2004. However he played second string to Makoto Kakegawa and Kota Ogi. He moved to the J2 League club Thespa Kusatsu in 2007. He played many matches as a regular goalkeeper. In 2009, his playing time decreased due to an injury and he retired at the end of the 2009 season.

== National team career ==
In April 1995, Honda was selected Japan U-20 national team for 1995 World Youth Championship. He played 2 matches.

== Club statistics ==
Club performance			League		Cup		League Cup		Total	
Season	Club	League	Apps	Goals	Apps	Goals	Apps	Goals	Apps	Goals
Japan			League		Emperor's Cup		J.League Cup		Total	
1995	Nagoya Grampus Eight	J1 League	0	0	0	0	-		0	0
1996	Nagoya Grampus Eight	J1 League	0	0	0	0	0	0	0	0
1997	Nagoya Grampus Eight	J1 League	0	0	0	0	0	0	0	0
1998	Nagoya Grampus Eight	J1 League	0	0	0	0	0	0	0	0
1999	Bellmare Hiratsuka	J1 League	19	0	0	0	1	0	20	0
2000	Nagoya Grampus Eight	J1 League	0	0	0	0	4	0	4	0
2001	Nagoya Grampus Eight	J1 League	2	0	1	0	0	0	3	0
2002	Nagoya Grampus Eight	J1 League	0	0	0	0	6	0	6	0
2003	Nagoya Grampus Eight	J1 League	3	0	0	0	0	0	3	0
2004	Nagoya Grampus Eight	J1 League	0	0	0	0	0	0	0	0
2004	Vissel Kobe	J1 League	6	0	0	0	0	0	6	0
2005	Vissel Kobe	J1 League	8	0	1	0	0	0	9	0
2006	Vissel Kobe	J2 League	1	0	0	0	-		1	0
2007	Thespa Kusatsu	J2 League	48	0	1	0	-		49	0
2008	Thespa Kusatsu	J2 League	34	0	2	0	-		36	0
2009	Thespa Kusatsu	J2 League	14	0	0	0	-		14	0
Total			135	0	5	0	11	0	151	0
