= 2005 Nagoya Grampus Eight season =

Nagoya Grampus Eight
2005 season
- Manager: Nelsinho; Hitoshi Nakata
- Stadium: Mizuho Athletic Stadium
- J. League 1: 14th
- Emperor's Cup: Fifth round vs Omiya Ardija
- J.League Cup: GL-D 3rd
- Top goalscorer: Naoshi Nakamura (7)

The 2005 Nagoya Grampus Eight season was Nagoya Grampus Eight's 13th season in the J. League Division 1 and 24th overall in the Japanese top flight. The club started the season under the management of Nelsinho, but he was sacked and replaced by Hitoshi Nakata. Nagoya finished the season in 14th place in the League, reached the Fifth Round of the Emperor's Cup and finished 3rd in Group D of the J. League Cup.

== J. League 1 ==
Match	Date	Venue	Opponents	Score
1	2005..			-
2	2005..			-
3	2005..			-
4	2005..			-
5	2005..			-
6	2005..			-
7	2005..			-
8	2005..			-
9	2005..			-
10	2005..			-
11	2005..			-
12	2005..			-
13	2005..			-
14	2005..			-
15	2005..			-
16	2005..			-
17	2005..			-
18	2005..			-
19	2005..			-
20	2005..			-
21	2005..			-
22	2005..			-
23	2005..			-
24	2005..			-
25	2005..			-
26	2005..			-
27	2005..			-
28	2005..			-
29	2005..			-
30	2005..			-
31	2005..			-
32	2005..			-
33	2005..			-
34	2005..			-

=== Table ===
Pos	Team	Pld	W	D	L	GF	GA	GD	Pts	Qualification or relegation
12	Albirex Niigata	34	11	9	14	47	62	−15	42	
13	Omiya Ardija	34	12	5	17	39	50	−11	41	
14	Nagoya Grampus Eight	34	10	9	15	43	49	−6	39	
15	Shimizu S-Pulse	34	9	12	13	40	49	−9	39	
16	Kashiwa Reysol (R)	34	8	11	15	39	54	−15	35	Relegation to 2006 J.League Division 2 (Note: Tokyo Verdy 1969 qualified to 2006 AFC Champions League as 2004 Emperor's Cup winners.)

Updated to match(es) played on December 3, 2005. Source: J. League Division 1
Rules for classification: 1) points; 2) goal difference; 3) number of goals scored.
(R) Relegated

=== Emperor's Cup ===
2005 Fourth Round	Nagoya Grampus Eight	1 – 0	ALO's Hokuriku	Nagoya
JST (UTC+9)		[ Report]		Stadium: Mizuho Athletic Stadium

2005 Fifth Round	Nagoya Grampus	1 – 2 (a.e.t.)	Omiya Ardija	Nagoya
JST (UTC+9)		[ Report]		Stadium: Mizuho Athletic Stadium

=== J.League Cup ===
19 March 2005 Group Stage	Nagoya Grampus Eight	1 – 2	Cerezo Osaka	Nagoya
JST (UTC+9)		[ Report]		Stadium: Mizuho Athletic Stadium

26 March 2005 Group Stage	Kashima Antlers	2 – 1	Nagoya Grampus Eight	Kashima
JST (UTC+9)		[ Report]		Stadium: Kashima Soccer Stadium

21 May 2005 Group Stage	Nagoya Grampus Eight	0 – 3	Shimizu S-Pulse	Nagoya
JST (UTC+9)		[ Report]		Stadium: Mizuho Athletic Stadium

28 May 2005 Group Stage	Nagoya Grampus Eight	1 – 0	Kashima Antlers	Nagoya
JST (UTC+9)		[ Report]		Stadium: Mizuho Athletic Stadium

4 June 2005 Group Stage	Cerezo Osaka	1 – 1	Nagoya Grampus Eight	Osaka
JST (UTC+9)		[ Report]		Stadium: Nagai Stadium

11 June 2005 Group Stage	Shimizu S-Pulse	0 – 1	Nagoya Grampus Eight	Shimizu-ku
JST (UTC+9)		[ Report]		Stadium: IAI Stadium Nihondaira

== Player statistics ==
No.	Pos.	Player	D.o.B. (Age)	Height / Weight	J. League 1		Emperor's Cup		J. League Cup		Total	
No.	Pos.	Player	D.o.B. (Age)	Height / Weight	Apps	Goals	Apps	Goals	Apps	Goals	Apps	Goals
1	GK	Seigo Narazaki	April 15, 1976 (aged 28)	cm / kg	32	0						
2	DF	Yutaka Akita	August 6, 1970 (aged 34)	cm / kg	19	1						
3	DF	Yusuke Igawa	October 30, 1982 (aged 22)	cm / kg	12	0						
4	DF	Masayuki Omori	November 9, 1976 (aged 28)	cm / kg	6	0						
5	DF	Masahiro Koga	September 8, 1978 (aged 26)	cm / kg	27	5						
6	DF	Yusuke Nakatani	September 22, 1978 (aged 26)	cm / kg	20	0						
7	MF	Naoshi Nakamura	January 27, 1979 (aged 26)	cm / kg	34	7						
8	MF	Claiton	January 25, 1978 (aged 27)	cm / kg	31	4						
9	FW	Marques	February 12, 1973 (aged 32)	cm / kg	11	3						
10	FW	Ueslei	April 19, 1972 (aged 32)	cm / kg	1	1						
10	MF	Toshiya Fujita	October 4, 1971 (aged 33)	cm / kg	22	2						
11	FW	Luizão	November 14, 1975 (aged 29)	cm / kg	6	4						
13	MF	Kei Yamaguchi	June 11, 1983 (aged 21)	cm / kg	20	1						
14	MF	Keiji Yoshimura	August 8, 1979 (aged 25)	cm / kg	23	0						
15	FW	Sho Kamogawa	February 7, 1983 (aged 22)	cm / kg	5	3						
16	DF	Takahiro Masukawa	November 8, 1979 (aged 25)	cm / kg	22	0						
17	MF	An Yong-Hak	October 25, 1978 (aged 26)	cm / kg	21	0						
18	MF	Shunichi Nakajima	June 16, 1982 (aged 22)	cm / kg	3	0						
19	FW	Keita Sugimoto	June 13, 1982 (aged 22)	cm / kg	29	3						
20	DF	Makoto Kakuda	July 10, 1983 (aged 21)	cm / kg	22	1						
22	GK	Eiji Kawashima	March 20, 1983 (aged 21)	cm / kg	3	0						
23	FW	Yohei Toyoda	April 11, 1985 (aged 19)	cm / kg	20	4						
24	MF	Keisuke Honda	June 13, 1986 (aged 18)	cm / kg	31	2						
25	MF	Yusuke Sudo	May 7, 1986 (aged 18)	cm / kg	3	0						
26	MF	Kiyohiro Hirabayashi	June 4, 1984 (aged 20)	cm / kg	5	1						
27	MF	Sebastian	December 10, 1986 (aged 18)	cm / kg	1	0						
28	DF	Keiji Watanabe	January 28, 1985 (aged 20)	cm / kg	13	0						
29	MF	Tsukasa Nishikawa	May 22, 1985 (aged 19)	cm / kg	0	0						
30	FW	Atsushi Katagiri	August 1, 1983 (aged 21)	cm / kg	0	0						
31	DF	Kenta Moroe	May 27, 1985 (aged 19)	cm / kg	0	0						
32	GK	Naoto Kono	September 9, 1985 (aged 19)	cm / kg	0	0						
32	FW	Satoshi Nakayama	November 7, 1981 (aged 23)	cm / kg	14	0						
33	FW	Tomoya Hirayama	September 14, 1985 (aged 19)	cm / kg	0	0						
34	GK	Tomoyasu Naito	September 11, 1986 (aged 18)	cm / kg	0	0						
35	MF	Wataru Inoue	August 7, 1986 (aged 18)	cm / kg	0	0						
36	GK	Koichi Hirono	April 16, 1980 (aged 24)	cm / kg	0	0						
37	FW	Tomohiro Tsuda	May 6, 1986 (aged 18)	cm / kg	1	0						
38	MF	Ryota Takahashi	December 28, 1986 (aged 18)	cm / kg	0	0						
39	FW	Eduardo	November 12, 1986 (aged 18)	cm / kg	2	0						

== Other pages ==
- (in Japanese) J. League official site
