= Kei Yamaguchi =

Japanese footballer (born 1983)

Kei Yamaguchi 山口 慶
Personal information
- Full name: Kei Yamaguchi
- Date of birth: June 11, 1983 (age 43)
- Place of birth: Joyo, Kyoto, Japan
- Height: 1.72 m (5 ft 7 1/2 in)
- Position: Midfielder

Youth career
- 1999–2001: Nagoya Grampus Eight

Senior career*
Years	Team	Apps	(Gls)
2002–2009	Nagoya Grampus	170	(4)
2010–2014	JEF United Chiba	100	(1)
Total		270	(5)

International career
2003	Japan U-20	1	(0)
Medal record
Nagoya Grampus
Runner-up	Emperor's Cup	2009
- * Club domestic league appearances and goals

Kei Yamaguchi (山口 慶, Yamaguchi Kei; born June 11, 1983) is a former Japanese football player.

== Club career ==
Yamaguchi was born in Joyo on June 11, 1983. He joined Nagoya Grampus Eight (later Nagoya Grampus) from youth team in 2002. He played many matches as defensive midfielder from first season. He became a regular player in 2006. He moved to JEF United Chiba in 2010. Although he played many matches, his opportunity to play decreased from 2012. He retired end of 2014 season.

== National team career ==
In November 2003, Yamaguchi was selected Japan U-20 national team for 2003 World Youth Championship. At this tournament, he played 1 match.

== Club statistics ==
Club performance			League		Cup		League Cup		Continental		Total	
Season	Club	League	Apps	Goals	Apps	Goals	Apps	Goals	Apps	Goals	Apps	Goals
Japan			League		Emperor's Cup		J.League Cup		Asia		Total	
2002	Nagoya Grampus Eight	J1 League	17	0	0	0	2	2	-		19	2
2003	Nagoya Grampus Eight	J1 League	15	0	0	0	4	0	-		19	0
2004	Nagoya Grampus Eight	J1 League	13	0	0	0	4	0	-		17	0
2005	Nagoya Grampus Eight	J1 League	20	1	1	0	4	0	-		25	1
2006	Nagoya Grampus Eight	J1 League	26	1	2	0	6	2	-		34	3
2007	Nagoya Grampus Eight	J1 League	33	2	1	0	4	0	-		38	2
2008	Nagoya Grampus	J1 League	22	0	3	0	4	0	-		29	0
2009	Nagoya Grampus	J1 League	24	0	2	0	2	0	7	0	35	0
2010	JEF United Chiba	J2 League	27	1	3	0	-		-		30	1
2011	JEF United Chiba	J2 League	36	0	2	0	-		-		38	0
2012	JEF United Chiba	J2 League	8	0	4	0	-		-		12	0
2013	JEF United Chiba	J2 League	11	0	1	0	-		-		12	0
2014	JEF United Chiba	J2 League	18	0	1	0	-		-		19	0
Career total			270	5	20	0	30	4	7	0	327	9
