= 2003 Nagoya Grampus Eight season =

Nagoya Grampus Eight
2003 season
- Manager: Zdenko Verdenik; Nelsinho Baptista
- Stadium: Mizuho Athletic Stadium
- J.League 1: 7th
- Emperor's Cup: 4th Round
- J.League Cup: Quarterfinals
- Top goalscorer: Ueslei (22)
Home colours	Away colours

2003 Nagoya Grampus Eight season

== Competitions ==
Competitions	Position
J.League 1	7th / 16 clubs
Emperor's Cup	4th round
J.League Cup	Quarterfinals

== Domestic results ==
=== J.League 1 ===
Match	Date	Venue	Opponents	Score
1-1	2003.3.22	Mizuho Athletic Stadium	Shimizu S-Pulse	2-2
1-2	2003.4.6	Urawa Komaba Stadium	Urawa Red Diamonds	0-0
1-3	2003.4.13	Toyota Stadium	Kashima Antlers	1-0
1-4	2003.4.19	Ajinomoto Stadium	FC Tokyo	1-1
1-5	2003.4.26	Mizuho Athletic Stadium	Kashiwa Reysol	1-1
1-6	2003.4.29	International Stadium Yokohama	Yokohama F. Marinos	0-0
1-7	2003.5.5	Mizuho Athletic Stadium	Oita Trinita	2-1
1-8	2003.5.10	Matsumoto Stadium	JEF United Ichihara	2-1
1-9	2003.5.18	Toyota Stadium	Vegalta Sendai	2-1
1-10	2003.5.24	Yamaha Stadium	Júbilo Iwata	1-1
1-11	2003.7.5	Toyota Stadium	Kyoto Purple Sanga	1-1
1-12	2003.7.12	Kobe Wing Stadium	Vissel Kobe	3-0
1-13	2003.7.19	Mizuho Athletic Stadium	Gamba Osaka	1-1
1-14	2003.7.26	Mizuho Athletic Stadium	Tokyo Verdy 1969	1-4
1-15	2003.8.2	Nagai Stadium	Cerezo Osaka	1-2
2-1	2003.8.16	Kashima Soccer Stadium	Kashima Antlers	0-1
2-2	2003.8.23	Mizuho Athletic Stadium	FC Tokyo	3-2
2-3	2003.8.30	Mizuho Athletic Stadium	JEF United Ichihara	1-3
2-4	2003.9.6	Sendai Stadium	Vegalta Sendai	3-0
2-5	2003.9.13	Toyota Stadium	Júbilo Iwata	2-2
2-6	2003.9.20	Nishikyogoku Athletic Stadium	Kyoto Purple Sanga	2-1
2-7	2003.9.23	Mizuho Athletic Stadium	Cerezo Osaka	3-1
2-8	2003.9.28	Ajinomoto Stadium	Tokyo Verdy 1969	4-4
2-9	2003.10.4	Hitachi Kashiwa Soccer Stadium	Kashiwa Reysol	2-2
2-10	2003.10.18	Mizuho Athletic Stadium	Vissel Kobe	1-2
2-11	2003.10.25	Osaka Expo '70 Stadium	Gamba Osaka	1-3
2-12	2003.11.9	Toyota Stadium	Yokohama F. Marinos	3-2
2-13	2003.11.15	Ōita Stadium	Oita Trinita	0-0
2-14	2003.11.22	Mizuho Athletic Stadium	Urawa Red Diamonds	4-1
2-15	2003.11.29	Nihondaira Sports Stadium	Shimizu S-Pulse	1-2

=== Emperor's Cup ===
Match	Date	Venue	Opponents	Score
3rd round	2003..			-
4th round	2003..			-

=== J.League Cup ===
Match	Date	Venue	Opponents	Score
GL-D-1	2003..			-
GL-D-2	2003..			-
GL-D-3	2003..			-
GL-D-4	2003..			-
Quarterfinals-1	2003..			-
Quarterfinals-2	2003..			-

== Player statistics ==
No.	Pos.	Player	D.o.B. (Age)	Height / Weight	J.League 1		Emperor's Cup		J.League Cup		Total	
No.	Pos.	Player	D.o.B. (Age)	Height / Weight	Apps	Goals	Apps	Goals	Apps	Goals	Apps	Goals
1	GK	Seigo Narazaki	April 15, 1976 (aged 26)	cm / kg	28	0						
2	DF	Hideaki Tominaga	August 27, 1976 (aged 26)	cm / kg	3	0						
3	DF	Andrej Panadić	March 9, 1969 (aged 33)	cm / kg	26	3						
4	DF	Masayuki Omori	November 9, 1976 (aged 26)	cm / kg	29	0						
5	DF	Masahiro Koga	September 8, 1978 (aged 24)	cm / kg	28	2						
6	DF	Yusuke Nakatani	September 22, 1978 (aged 24)	cm / kg	14	1						
7	MF	Naoshi Nakamura	January 27, 1979 (aged 24)	cm / kg	22	3						
8	MF	Tomoyuki Sakai	June 29, 1979 (aged 23)	cm / kg	17	1						
9	FW	Ivica Vastić	September 29, 1969 (aged 33)	cm / kg	9	3						
9	FW	Marques	February 12, 1973 (aged 30)	cm / kg	19	5						
10	FW	Ueslei	April 19, 1972 (aged 30)	cm / kg	27	22						
11	MF	Chikara Fujimoto	October 31, 1977 (aged 25)	cm / kg	23	2						
13	MF	Kunihiko Takizawa	April 20, 1978 (aged 24)	cm / kg	28	1						
14	DF	Taisei Fujita	January 31, 1982 (aged 21)	cm / kg	0	0						
15	MF	Chong Yong-De	February 4, 1978 (aged 25)	cm / kg	6	0						
16	GK	Seiji Honda	February 25, 1976 (aged 27)	cm / kg	3	0						
17	DF	Kojiro Kaimoto	October 14, 1977 (aged 25)	cm / kg	18	2						
18	DF	Keiji Kaimoto	November 26, 1972 (aged 30)	cm / kg	7	0						
19	MF	Taku Harada	October 27, 1982 (aged 20)	cm / kg	1	0						
20	FW	Ryuta Hara	April 19, 1981 (aged 21)	cm / kg	19	1						
21	MF	Tetsuya Okayama	August 27, 1973 (aged 29)	cm / kg	23	2						
22	GK	Yasuhiro Tominaga	May 22, 1980 (aged 22)	cm / kg	0	0						
23	MF	Ryuji Kitamura	March 15, 1981 (aged 21)	cm / kg	0	0						
24	FW	Ryoji Ujihara	May 10, 1981 (aged 21)	cm / kg	4	0						
25	MF	Keiji Yoshimura	August 8, 1979 (aged 23)	cm / kg	24	1						
26	MF	Kiyohiro Hirabayashi	June 4, 1984 (aged 18)	cm / kg	0	0						
27	MF	Takashi Mori	March 4, 1985 (aged 18)	cm / kg	0	0						
28	DF	Keiji Watanabe	January 28, 1985 (aged 18)	cm / kg	1	0						
29	DF	Kota Fukatsu	August 10, 1984 (aged 18)	cm / kg	1	0						
30	FW	Atsushi Katagiri	August 1, 1983 (aged 19)	cm / kg	0	0						
31	MF	Kei Yamaguchi	June 11, 1983 (aged 19)	cm / kg	15	0						
32	DF	Yasunari Hiraoka	March 13, 1972 (aged 30)	cm / kg	0	0						
33	MF	Ryuji Akiba	June 13, 1984 (aged 18)	cm / kg	1	0						
36	GK	Koichi Hirono	April 16, 1980 (aged 22)	cm / kg	0	0						
37	FW	Keiji Ishizuka	August 26, 1974 (aged 28)	cm / kg	3	0						

== Other pages ==
- (in Japanese) J. League official site
