= Keiji Yoshimura =

Japanese footballer (born 1979)

Keiji Yoshimura 吉村 圭司
Personal information
- Full name: Keiji Yoshimura
- Date of birth: August 8, 1979 (age 47)
- Place of birth: Sakawa, Kochi, Japan
- Height: 1.76 m (5 ft 9 1/2 in)
- Position: Midfielder

Youth career
- 1995–1997: Ehime FC
- 1998–2001: Aichi Gakuin University

Senior career*
Years	Team	Apps	(Gls)
2002–2012	Nagoya Grampus	196	(4)
2013–2015	Ehime FC	51	(4)
Total		247	(8)
Medal record
Nagoya Grampus
Winner	J1 League	2010
Runner-up	J1 League	2011
Runner-up	Emperor's Cup	2009
- * Club domestic league appearances and goals

Keiji Yoshimura (吉村 圭司, Yoshimura Keiji; born August 8, 1979) is a former Japanese football player. His elder brother Koji is also a former footballer.

== Playing career ==
Yoshimura was born in Sakawa, Kochi on August 8, 1979. After graduating from Aichi Gakuin University, he joined J1 League club Nagoya Grampus Eight (later Nagoya Grampus) in 2002. He became a regular player as defensive midfielder in 2003 and played many matches for a long time. In 2009, Grampus won the 2nd place in Emperor's Cup. Although his opportunity to play decreased from 2010, Grampus won the champions in 2010 J1 League first J1 League champions in the club history. In 2013, he moved to J2 League club Ehime FC which he played for the youth team. He played many matches as defensive midfielder. However he could not play many matches in 2015 and retired end of 2015 season.

== Club statistics ==
Club performance			League		Cup		League Cup		Continental		Total	
Season	Club	League	Apps	Goals	Apps	Goals	Apps	Goals	Apps	Goals	Apps	Goals
Japan			League		Emperor's Cup		J.League Cup		Asia		Total	
2002	Nagoya Grampus Eight	J1 League	2	0	3	1	0	0	-		5	1
2003	Nagoya Grampus Eight	J1 League	24	1	2	0	5	2	-		31	3
2004	Nagoya Grampus Eight	J1 League	22	0	2	0	6	0	-		30	0
2005	Nagoya Grampus Eight	J1 League	23	0	2	0	4	0	-		29	0
2006	Nagoya Grampus Eight	J1 League	19	1	1	0	3	0	-		23	1
2007	Nagoya Grampus Eight	J1 League	17	0	2	2	5	0	-		24	2
2008	Nagoya Grampus	J1 League	28	1	2	0	7	0	-		37	1
2009	Nagoya Grampus	J1 League	30	1	6	2	2	0	9	0	47	3
2010	Nagoya Grampus	J1 League	14	0	2	0	5	0	-		21	0
2011	Nagoya Grampus	J1 League	6	0	4	0	2	0	3	0	15	0
2012	Nagoya Grampus	J1 League	11	0	2	0	2	0	4	0	19	0
2013	Ehime FC	J2 League	23	3	0	0	-		-		23	3
2014	Ehime FC	J2 League	25	1	0	0	-		-		25	1
2015	Ehime FC	J2 League	3	0	1	0	-		-		4	0
Career total			247	4	29	5	41	2	16	0	333	11
