= Yusuke Nakatani =

Japanese footballer (born 1978)

Yusuke Nakatani 中谷 勇介
Personal information
- Full name: Yusuke Nakatani
- Date of birth: September 22, 1978 (age 48)
- Place of birth: Uji, Japan
- Height: 1.78 m (5 ft 10 in)
- Positions: Midfielder; defender

Youth career
- 1994–1996: Nara Ikuei High School

Senior career*
Years	Team	Apps	(Gls)
1997–2005	Nagoya Grampus Eight	123	(2)
1999	→ Urawa Reds (loan)	1	(0)
2000	→ Kawasaki Frontale (loan)	10	(1)
2006–2007	Kashiwa Reysol	4	(0)
2007–2010	Kyoto Sanga FC	63	(2)
2011–2012	Tokyo Verdy	36	(1)
2013	Khonkaen		
Total		237	(5)

International career
1995	Japan U-17	3	(0)
Medal record
Nagoya Grampus Eight
Winner	Emperor's Cup	1999
Kawasaki Frontale
Runner-up	J.League Cup	2000
Representing Japan
AFC U-16 Championship
Gold medal – first place	1994 Qatar
- * Club domestic league appearances and goals

Yusuke Nakatani (中谷 勇介, Nakatani Yusuke; born September 22, 1978) is a former Japanese football player.

== Club career ==
Nakatani was born in Uji on September 22, 1978. After graduating from high school, he joined Nagoya Grampus Eight in 1997. In 1998, he became a regular player as left side back instead of Seiichi Ogawa who got hurt. He moved to Urawa Reds (1999) and Kawasaki Frontale (2000) on loan. However both clubs were relegated to J2 League. He returned to Grampus in 2001 and played until 2005. He played many matches as left midfielder and left side-back. He moved to Kashiwa Reysol. However he could hardly play in the match and he moved to his local club Kyoto Sanga FC in J2 League in September 2007. The club was promoted to J1 League from 2008 and he played many matches. In 2010, he could hardly play in the match and he moved to J2 club Tokyo Verdy in 2011. In 2013, he moved to Thailand and played for Khonkaen. He retired at the end of the 2013 season.

== National team career ==
In August 1995, Nakatani was selected Japan U-17 national team for 1995 U-17 World Championship. He played all 3 matches as substitutes.

== Career statistics ==
Appearances and goals by club, season and competition
Club	Season	League			Emperor's Cup		J.League Cup		Total	
Club	Season	Division	Apps	Goals	Apps	Goals	Apps	Goals	Apps	Goals
Nagoya Grampus Eight	1997	J1 League	0	0	0	0	0	0	0	0
Nagoya Grampus Eight	1998	J1 League	26	0	3	0	4	0	33	0
Nagoya Grampus Eight	1999	J1 League	13	0	0	0	3	0	16	0
Urawa Reds	1999	J1 League	1	0	0	0	0	0	1	0
Kawasaki Frontale	2000	J1 League	10	1	0	0	1	0	11	1
Nagoya Grampus Eight	2001	J1 League	14	0	1	0	2	0	17	0
Nagoya Grampus Eight	2002	J1 League	11	1	0	0	4	1	15	2
Nagoya Grampus Eight	2003	J1 League	14	1	1	0	2	0	17	1
Nagoya Grampus Eight	2004	J1 League	25	0	2	0	4	1	31	1
Nagoya Grampus Eight	2005	J1 League	20	0	1	0	4	0	25	0
Kashiwa Reysol	2006	J2 League	4	0	1	0	—		5	0
Kashiwa Reysol	2007	J1 League	0	0	0	0	0	0	0	0
Kyoto Sanga FC	2007	J2 League	11	1	0	0	—		11	1
Kyoto Sanga FC	2008	J1 League	25	1	1	0	3	0	29	1
Kyoto Sanga FC	2009	J1 League	22	0	2	0	1	0	25	0
Kyoto Sanga FC	2010	J1 League	5	0	0	0	0	0	5	0
Tokyo Verdy	2011	J2 League	16	1	2	0	—		18	1
Tokyo Verdy	2012	J2 League	20	0	1	0	—		21	0
Career total			237	6	15	0	28	2	280	8
