= Masahiro Koga =

Japanese footballer

Masahiro Koga 古賀 正紘
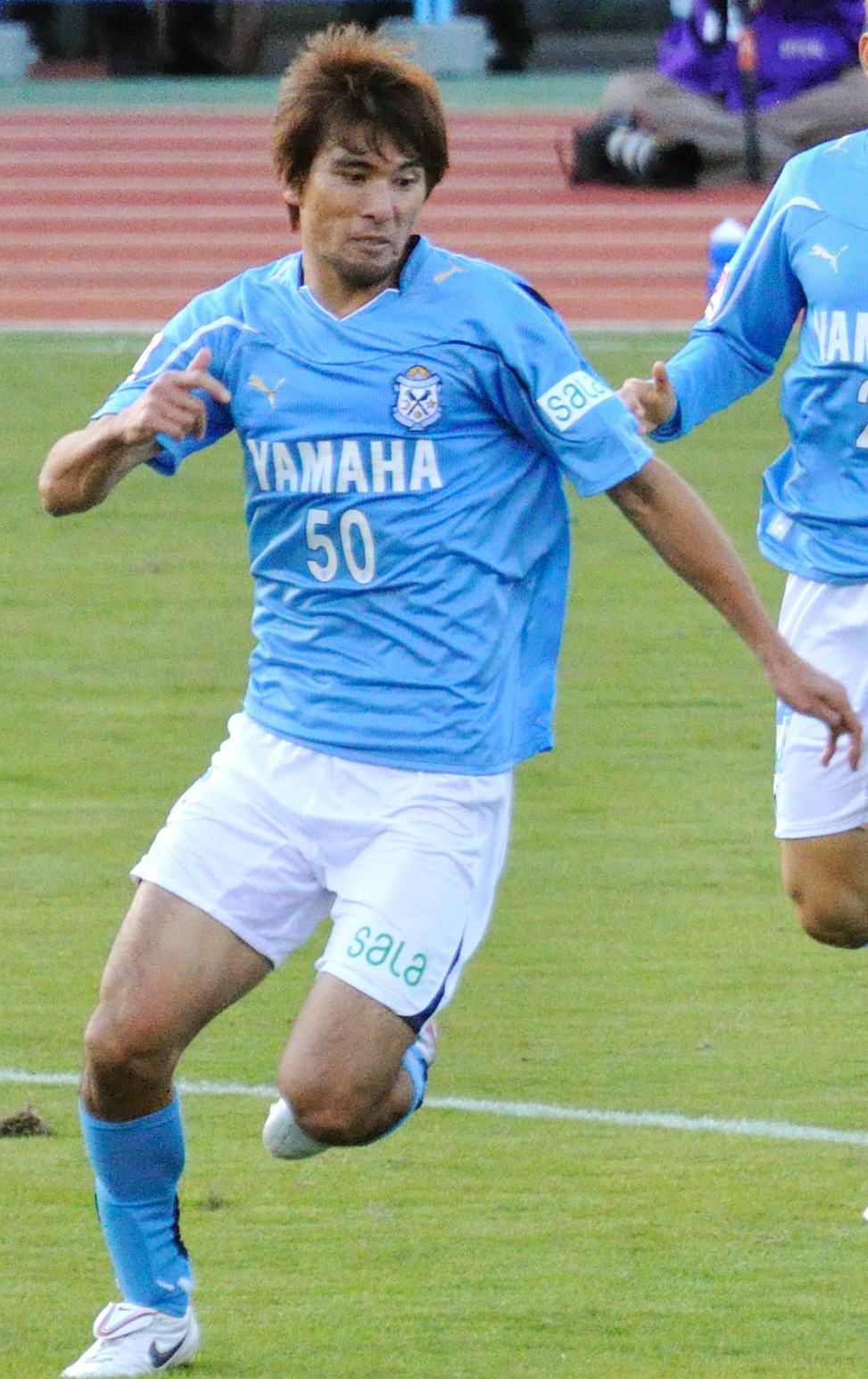

Personal information
- Full name: Masahiro Koga
- Date of birth: September 8, 1978 (age 48)
- Place of birth: Okawa, Fukuoka, Japan
- Height: 1.85 m (6 ft 1 in)
- Position: Defender

Youth career
- 1994–1996: Higashi Fukuoka High School

Senior career*
Years	Team	Apps	(Gls)
1997–2006	Nagoya Grampus Eight	231	(15)
2007–2010	Kashiwa Reysol	78	(5)
2010–2011	Júbilo Iwata	19	(0)
2012–2015	Avispa Fukuoka	74	(1)
Total		402	(21)

International career
1995	Japan U-17	3	(0)
Medal record
Nagoya Grampus Eight
Winner	Emperor's Cup	1999
Kashiwa Reysol
Runner-up	Emperor's Cup	2008
Júbilo Iwata
Winner	J.League Cup	2010
Representing Japan
AFC U-16 Championship
Gold medal – first place	1994 Qatar
- * Club domestic league appearances and goals

Masahiro Koga (古賀 正紘, Koga Masahiro; born September 8, 1978) is a former Japanese football player. His younger brother Seiji is also a footballer.

== Club career ==
Koga was born in Okawa on September 8, 1978. After graduating from high school, he joined the Nagoya Grampus Eight in 1997. He became a regular player as a center back from 1998. The club won the 1999 Emperor's Cup. He moved to Kashiwa Reysol in 2007. Although he played as a regular player, he lost his place due to an injury in 2010. He then moved to Júbilo Iwata in August 2010. After playing for two seasons, he moved to his local club Avispa Fukuoka in 2012. He retired at the end of the 2015 season.

== National team career ==
In August 1995, Koga was selected by the Japan U-17 national team for the 1995 U-17 World Championship and he played full time in all three matches. In June 1997, he was also selected by the Japan U-20 national team for the 1997 World Youth Championship, but he did not play in any matches.

== Career statistics ==
Appearances and goals by club, season and competition
Club	Season	League			Emperor's Cup		J.League Cup		Total	
Club	Season	Division	Apps	Goals	Apps	Goals	Apps	Goals	Apps	Goals
Nagoya Grampus Eight	1997	J1 League	8	0	1	0	5	0	14	0
Nagoya Grampus Eight	1998	J1 League	21	0	0	0	0	0	21	0
Nagoya Grampus Eight	1999	J1 League	26	2	5	0	4	0	35	2
Nagoya Grampus Eight	2000	J1 League	25	2	1	0	4	0	30	2
Nagoya Grampus Eight	2001	J1 League	18	0	0	0	3	0	21	0
Nagoya Grampus Eight	2002	J1 League	28	1	3	0	6	0	37	1
Nagoya Grampus Eight	2003	J1 League	28	2	2	0	4	0	34	2
Nagoya Grampus Eight	2004	J1 League	24	1	2	1	7	0	33	2
Nagoya Grampus Eight	2005	J1 League	27	5	1	0	6	0	34	5
Nagoya Grampus Eight	2006	J1 League	26	2	0	0	5	0	31	2
Kashiwa Reysol	2007	J1 League	29	2	1	0	2	1	32	3
Kashiwa Reysol	2008	J1 League	29	1	5	1	5	1	39	3
Kashiwa Reysol	2009	J1 League	20	2	0	0	4	0	24	2
Kashiwa Reysol	2010	J2 League	0	0	0	0	0	0	0	0
Júbilo Iwata	2010	J1 League	12	0	2	0	3	0	17	0
Júbilo Iwata	2011	J1 League	7	0	1	0	2	0	10	0
Avispa Fukuoka	2012	J2 League	33	1	2	0	-	-	35	1
Avispa Fukuoka	2013	J2 League	22	0	0	0	0	0	22	0
Avispa Fukuoka	2014	J2 League	13	0	1	0	0	0	14	0
Avispa Fukuoka	2015	J2 League	6	0	0	0	0	0	6	0
Career total			402	21	27	2	60	2	489	25
