= Marques (footballer, born 1973) =

Brazilian footballer

Personal information
- Full name: Marques Batista de Abreu
- Date of birth: February 12, 1973 (age 53)
- Place of birth: Guarulhos, Brazil
- Height: 1.74 m (5 ft 9 in)
- Position: Striker

Youth career
- 1992–1993: Corinthians

Senior career*
Years	Team	Apps	(Gls)
1993–1995	Corinthians	37	(9)
1996	Flamengo	19	(4)
1997	São Paulo	11	(1)
1997–2002	Atlético Mineiro	139	(49)
2003	Vasco da Gama	11	(1)
2003–2005	Nagoya Grampus Eight	59	(25)
2005	Atlético Mineiro	30	(10)
2006–2007	Yokohama F. Marinos	31	(2)
2008–2010	Atlético Mineiro	23	(4)

International career
1994–2002	Brazil	13	(4)
- * Club domestic league appearances and goals

Marques Batista de Abreu (born February 12, 1973), or simply Marques, is a former Brazilian striker. In 2003, when Marques was playing for Nagoya Grampus Eight he was ranked 2nd highest assists in J1 League as he had 10 assists and was beaten by Yukihiko Sato who had 12 assists during that season. Marques also had a great partnership with fellow Brazilian, Ueslei who topped the goal scoring in 2003 J1 League season.

It has been reported that Marques plans to retire from football in 2010 and run for political office for the Brazilian Labour Party.

== Career statistics ==
=== Club ===
Club performance			League		Cup		League Cup		Total	
Season	Club	League	Apps	Goals	Apps	Goals	Apps	Goals	Apps	Goals
Brazil			League		Copa do Brasil		League Cup		Total	
1993	Corinthians Paulista	Série A	1	0					1	0
1994	Corinthians Paulista	Série A	26	8					26	8
1995	Corinthians Paulista	Série A	9	1					9	1
1996	Flamengo	Série A	19	4					19	4
1997	Atlético Mineiro	Série A	25	6					25	6
1998	Atlético Mineiro	Série A	21	8					21	8
1999	Atlético Mineiro	Série A	21	5					21	5
2000	Atlético Mineiro	Série A	18	4					18	4
2001	Atlético Mineiro	Série A	24	15					24	15
2002	Atlético Mineiro	Série A	21	8					21	8
2003	Vasco da Gama	Série A	11	1					11	1
Japan			League		Emperor's Cup		J.League Cup		Total	
2003	Nagoya Grampus Eight	J1 League	19	5	1	0	4	0	24	5
2004	Nagoya Grampus Eight	J1 League	29	17	1	1	7	5	37	23
2005	Nagoya Grampus Eight	J1 League	11	3	0	0	3	2	14	5
Brazil			League		Copa do Brasil		League Cup		Total	
2005	Atlético Mineiro	Série A	30	10					30	10
Japan			League		Emperor's Cup		J.League Cup		Total	
2006	Yokohama F. Marinos	J1 League	19	2	3	1	2	1	24	4
2007	Yokohama F. Marinos	J1 League	12	0	1	0	3	1	16	1
Brazil			League		Copa do Brasil		League Cup		Total	
2008	Atlético Mineiro	Série A	21	4					21	4
2009	Atlético Mineiro	Série A	2	0					2	0
2010	Atlético Mineiro	Série A								
Country	Brazil		249	66					249	66
Country	Japan		90	27	6	2	19	9	115	38
Total			339	93	6	2	19	9	364	104

=== International ===
Brazil national team
Year	Apps	Goals
1994	1	0
1995	0	0
1996	1	3
1997	0	0
1998	0	0
1999	0	0
2000	6	0
2001	0	0
2002	3	0
Total	11	3

== Performances for National Team ==
Last update: 10 Jan 2007

Team	Competition	Category	Apps	Goals	Team Record
Brazil	2002 FIFA World Cup qualification	Senior	6	1	Qualified

== Honours ==
=== Club ===
Corinthians

- Campeonato Paulista: 1995
- Copa do Brasil: 1995

Flamengo

- Campeonato Carioca: 1996
- Copa de Oro: 1996

Atlético Mineiro

- Copa Conmebol: 1997
- Campeonato Mineiro: 1999, 2000, 2010

Vasco da Gama

- Campeonato Carioca: 2003

=== Individual ===
- J1 League Best eleven: 2004
- Minas Gerais state league's top scorer: 1998
- Brazilian Bola de Prata (Placar): 1999, 2001
