= 2004 Nagoya Grampus Eight season =

Nagoya Grampus Eight
2004 season
- Manager: Nelsinho
- Stadium: Mizuho Athletic Stadium
- J. League 1: 7th
- Emperor's Cup: Fifth round
- J.League Cup: Semi-finals
- Top goalscorer: Marques (17)
Home colours	Away colours

During the 2004 season Nagoya Grampus Eight competed in the J. League 1, the top tier of Japanese football, and finished 7th in the league.

== Competitions ==
Competitions	Position
J. League 1	7th / 16 clubs
Emperor's Cup	5th Round
J. League Cup	Semifinals

== Domestic results ==
=== J. League 1 ===
Match	Date	Venue	Opponents	Score
1-1	2004.3.13	Nagai Stadium	Cerezo Osaka	1-2
1-2	2004.3.20	Toyota Stadium	Júbilo Iwata	1-3
1-3	2004.4.4	Kashima Soccer Stadium	Kashima Antlers	3-2
1-4	2004.4.11	Toyota Stadium	Kashiwa Reysol	1-0
1-5	2004.4.14	Hiroshima Big Arch	Sanfrecce Hiroshima	1-1
1-6	2004.4.17	Mizuho Athletic Stadium	Shimizu S-Pulse	2-2
1-7	2004.5.2	Osaka Expo '70 Stadium	Gamba Osaka	0-2
1-8	2004.5.5	Mizuho Athletic Stadium	Albirex Niigata	1-1
1-9	2004.5.9	Ichihara Seaside Stadium	JEF United Ichihara	1-1
1-10	2004.5.15	Toyota Stadium	Tokyo Verdy 1969	1-2
1-11	2004.5.23	International Stadium Yokohama	Yokohama F. Marinos	2-1
1-12	2004.6.12	Toyota Stadium	Urawa Red Diamonds	0-3
1-13	2004.6.16	Mizuho Athletic Stadium	Oita Trinita	2-1
1-14	2004.6.19	Ajinomoto Stadium	FC Tokyo	3-2
1-15	2004.6.26	Mizuho Athletic Stadium	Vissel Kobe	2-2
2-1	2004.8.14	Mizuho Athletic Stadium	Gamba Osaka	1-2
2-2	2004.8.21	Yamaha Stadium	Júbilo Iwata	1-2
2-3	2004.8.29	Mizuho Athletic Stadium	Yokohama F. Marinos	2-1
2-4	2004.9.12	Niigata Stadium	Albirex Niigata	0-0
2-5	2004.9.18	Ajinomoto Stadium	Tokyo Verdy 1969	3-1
2-6	2004.9.23	Mizuho Athletic Stadium	Cerezo Osaka	5-2
2-8	2004.10.2	Toyota Stadium	FC Tokyo	1-1
2-9	2004.10.17	Hitachi Kashiwa Soccer Stadium	Kashiwa Reysol	2-2
2-10	2004.10.23	Mizuho Athletic Stadium	JEF United Ichihara	0-2
2-11	2004.10.30	Nihondaira Sports Stadium	Shimizu S-Pulse	1-2
2-12	2004.11.6	Mizuho Athletic Stadium	Sanfrecce Hiroshima	2-1
2-7	2004.11.10	Oita Stadium	Oita Trinita	0-4
2-13	2004.11.20	Urawa Komaba Stadium	Urawa Red Diamonds	1-2
2-14	2004.11.23	Kobe Wing Stadium	Vissel Kobe	2-1
2-15	2004.11.28	Toyota Stadium	Kashima Antlers	0-2

=== Emperor's Cup ===
Match	Date	Venue	Opponents	Score
4th Round	2004.11.14	Mizuho Athletic Stadium	Honda FC	3-0
5th Round	2004.12.12	Toyota Stadium	Tokyo Verdy 1969	2-1

=== J. League Cup ===
Match	Date	Venue	Opponents	Score
GL-B-1	2004.3.27	Osaka Expo '70 Stadium	Gamba Osaka	1-3
GL-B-2	2004.4.29	Mizuho Athletic Stadium	Júbilo Iwata	5-2
GL-B-3	2004.5.29	Mizuho Athletic Stadium	Albirex Niigata	1-2
GL-B-4	2004.6.5	Niigata Stadium	Albirex Niigata	0-1
GL-B-5	2004.7.17	Mizuho Athletic Stadium	Gamba Osaka	2-2
GL-B-6	2004.7.24	Kagoshima Kamoike Stadium	Júbilo Iwata	1-1
Quarterfinals	2004.9.4	Mizuho Athletic Stadium	Kashima Antlers	2-1
Semifinals	2004.10.11	Mizuho Athletic Stadium	Urawa Red Diamonds	1-4

== Player statistics ==
No.	Pos.	Player	D.o.B. (Age)	Height / Weight	J. League 1		Emperor's Cup		J. League Cup		Total	
No.	Pos.	Player	D.o.B. (Age)	Height / Weight	Apps	Goals	Apps	Goals	Apps	Goals	Apps	Goals
1	GK	Seigo Narazaki	April 15, 1976 (aged 27)	cm / kg	26	0						
2	DF	Yutaka Akita	August 6, 1970 (aged 33)	cm / kg	26	0						
3	DF	Andrej Panadić	March 9, 1969 (aged 35)	cm / kg	3	0						
3	DF	Yusuke Igawa	October 30, 1982 (aged 21)	cm / kg	11	0						
4	DF	Masayuki Omori	November 9, 1976 (aged 27)	cm / kg	19	0						
5	DF	Masahiro Koga	September 8, 1978 (aged 25)	cm / kg	24	1						
6	DF	Yusuke Nakatani	September 22, 1978 (aged 25)	cm / kg	25	0						
7	MF	Naoshi Nakamura	January 27, 1979 (aged 25)	cm / kg	29	5						
8	MF	Teruo Iwamoto	May 2, 1972 (aged 31)	cm / kg	5	0						
9	FW	Marques	February 12, 1973 (aged 31)	cm / kg	29	17						
10	FW	Ueslei	April 19, 1972 (aged 31)	cm / kg	25	10						
11	MF	Harutaka Ono	May 12, 1978 (aged 25)	cm / kg	10	0						
13	MF	Kunihiko Takizawa	April 20, 1978 (aged 25)	cm / kg	8	0						
14	DF	Taisei Fujita	January 31, 1982 (aged 22)	cm / kg	6	0						
15	MF	Chong Yong-De	February 4, 1978 (aged 26)	cm / kg	3	0						
16	GK	Seiji Honda	February 25, 1976 (aged 28)	cm / kg	0	0						
17	DF	Kojiro Kaimoto	October 14, 1977 (aged 26)	cm / kg	21	2						
18	DF	Keiji Kaimoto	November 26, 1972 (aged 31)	cm / kg	9	0						
19	FW	Jorginho	December 4, 1985 (aged 18)	cm / kg	8	2						
20	DF	Makoto Kakuda	July 10, 1983 (aged 20)	cm / kg	22	4						
21	MF	Tetsuya Okayama	August 27, 1973 (aged 30)	cm / kg	21	4						
22	GK	Eiji Kawashima	March 20, 1983 (aged 20)	cm / kg	4	0						
23	MF	Ryuji Kitamura	March 15, 1981 (aged 22)	cm / kg	0	0						
24	FW	Ryoji Ujihara	May 10, 1981 (aged 22)	cm / kg	2	0						
25	MF	Keiji Yoshimura	August 8, 1979 (aged 24)	cm / kg	22	0						
26	MF	Kiyohiro Hirabayashi	June 4, 1984 (aged 19)	cm / kg	8	0						
27	MF	Takashi Mori	March 4, 1985 (aged 19)	cm / kg	0	0						
28	DF	Keiji Watanabe	January 28, 1985 (aged 19)	cm / kg	5	0						
29	DF	Kota Fukatsu	August 10, 1984 (aged 19)	cm / kg	0	0						
30	MF	Claiton	January 25, 1978 (aged 26)	cm / kg	13	3						
31	MF	Kei Yamaguchi	June 11, 1983 (aged 20)	cm / kg	13	0						
32	GK	Naoto Kono	September 9, 1985 (aged 18)	cm / kg	0	0						
33	FW	Tomoya Hirayama	September 14, 1985 (aged 18)	cm / kg	0	0						
34	FW	Yohei Toyoda	April 11, 1985 (aged 18)	cm / kg	4	0						
35	FW	Yasuyuki Moriyama	May 1, 1969 (aged 34)	cm / kg	1	0						
36	GK	Koichi Hirono	April 16, 1980 (aged 23)	cm / kg	0	0						
37	MF	Tsukasa Nishikawa	May 22, 1985 (aged 18)	cm / kg	0	0						
38	DF	Kenta Moroe	May 27, 1985 (aged 18)	cm / kg	0	0						
39	MF	Keisuke Honda	June 13, 1986 (aged 17)	cm / kg	0	0						

== Other pages ==
- (in Japanese) J. League official site
