= Andrej Panadić =

Croatian footballer (born 1969)

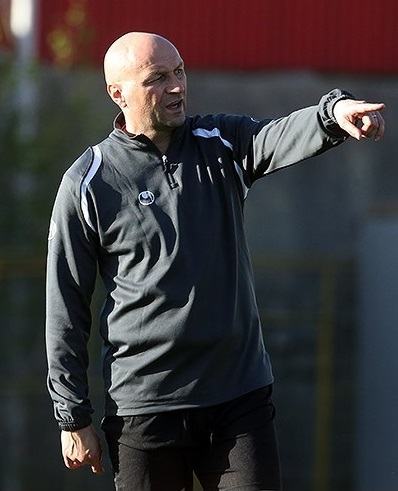
- Panadić with Persepolis

Personal information
- Full name: Andrej Panadić
- Date of birth: 9 March 1969 (age 57)
- Place of birth: Zagreb, SR Croatia, Yugoslavia
- Height: 1.88 m (6 ft 2 in)
- Position: Defender

Team information
- Current team: Naft Al-Basra SC (manager)

Youth career
- Radnik Velika Gorica

Senior career*
Years	Team	Apps	(Gls)
1988–1994	Dinamo Zagreb	148	(14)
1994–1996	Chemnitzer FC	65	(6)
1996–1997	KFC Uerdingen 05	45	(3)
1997–2001	Hamburger SV	101	(5)
2002	Sturm Graz	14	(1)
2002–2004	Nagoya Grampus Eight	51	(3)
Total		410	(30)

International career
1989	Yugoslavia	3	(0)

Managerial career
- 2007–2008: Radnik
- 2008: LASK Linz
- 2016: Istra 1961
- 2019: Krško
- 2019–2020: Rudar Velenje
- 2022–2023: Ferizaj
- 2024: Naft Al-Basra SC
Medal record
Representing Yugoslavia
Silver medal – second place	UEFA U-21 Euro	1990
- * Club domestic league appearances and goals

Andrej Panadić (born 9 March 1969) is a Croatian football manager and a former defender. Besides Croatia, he has played in Germany, Austria, and Japan.

== Playing career ==
=== Club ===
He played for Dinamo Zagreb (1988–1994), Chemnitzer FC (1994–1996), KFC Uerdingen 05 (1996), Hamburger SV (1997–2002), Sturm Graz (2001–2002), and Nagoya Grampus Eight (2002–2004).

With Dinamo Zagreb he won a Croatian championship in 1993.

With Dinamo Zagreb he won a Croatian cup in 1994.

With Hamburger SV he played the Intertoto Cup final against Montpellier in 1999 where he score the goal in away game. He also played in the group stage of the Champions league sezone 2000/01 with Hamburger SV (Juventus, Panatinaikos, Deportivo La Coruna) where he scored a goal against Juventus in Turin.

=== International ===
Panadić played 6 games for Yugoslavia U21 team. With this team he won a Silver medal in U21 European Football Championship against the Soviet Union in 1990.

He made his debut for Yugoslavia A team in a September 1989 friendly match against Greece and earned a total of 3 caps. He was a squad member at the 1990 FIFA World Cup.

== Managerial career ==
After finishing his football playing career, he attended the Croatian Football Federations coaching academy and earned his UEFA PRO diploma in 2008.

Panadić started his coaching career at NK Radnik from Velika Gorica.

As an assistant coach to one of the most respected Croatian coaches, Branko Ivanković, he worked at the clubs Al Ettifaq, Al Wahda, Persepolis FC from 2011 to 2016.

In the meantime, Panadić worked as a tactical analyst for the Croatian national football team under the leadership of coaches Niko Kovač, Ante Čačić and Zlatko Dalić. As a tactical analyst, he was part of Niko Kovač coaching team at the 2014 World Cup in Brazil.

As a head coach he trained NK Radnik, LASK Linz, NK Istra Pula, Padideh FC, NK Krško, NK Rudar Velenje, FC Ferizaj, Naft Al Basra.

== Career statistics ==
=== Club ===
Appearances and goals by club, season and competition
Club	Season	League		
Club	Season	Division	Apps	Goals
Dinamo Zagreb	1988–89	First League	28	3
Dinamo Zagreb	1989–90	First League	30	4
Dinamo Zagreb	1990–91	First League	18	0
Dinamo Zagreb	Total		76	7
HAŠK-Građanski	1992	Prva HNL	20	0
Croatia Zagreb	1992–93	Prva HNL	29	3
Croatia Zagreb	1993–94	Prva HNL	23	4
Croatia Zagreb	Total		52	7
Chemnitzer FC	1994–95	2. Bundesliga	32	4
Chemnitzer FC	1995–96	2. Bundesliga	33	2
Chemnitzer FC	Total		65	6
KFC Uerdingen 05	1996–97	2. Bundesliga	31	2
KFC Uerdingen 05	1997–98	2. Bundesliga	14	1
KFC Uerdingen 05	Total		45	3
Hamburger SV	1997–98	Bundesliga	13	2
Hamburger SV	1998–99	Bundesliga	26	2
Hamburger SV	1999–00	Bundesliga	29	1
Hamburger SV	2000–01	Bundesliga	24	0
Hamburger SV	2001–02	Bundesliga	9	0
Hamburger SV	Total		101	5
Sturm Graz	2001–02	Austrian Bundesliga	14	1
Nagoya Grampus Eight	2002	J1 League	22	0
Nagoya Grampus Eight	2003	J1 League	26	3
Nagoya Grampus Eight	2004	J1 League	3	0
Nagoya Grampus Eight	Total		51	3
Career total			424	32

=== International ===
Appearances and goals by national team and year
National team	Year	Apps	Goals
Yugoslavia	1989	3	0
Total		3	0
