= Masayuki Omori =

Japanese footballer

Masayuki Omori 大森 征之
Personal information
- Full name: Masayuki Omori
- Date of birth: November 9, 1976 (age 50)
- Place of birth: Saitama, Japan
- Height: 1.76 m (5 ft 9 1/2 in)
- Positions: Midfielder; defender

Youth career
- 1992–1994: Omiya Higashi High School

Senior career*
Years	Team	Apps	(Gls)
1995	Sanfrecce Hiroshima	0	(0)
1996–1997	Sagan Tosu	29	(0)
1998–2008	Nagoya Grampus	208	(0)
Total		237	(0)
Medal record
Sanfrecce Hiroshima
Runner-up	Emperor's Cup	1995
Nagoya Grampus
Winner	Emperor's Cup	1999
- * Club domestic league appearances and goals

Masayuki Omori (大森 征之, Ōmori Masayuki; born November 9, 1976) is a former Japanese football player.

== Playing career ==
Omori was born in Saitama on November 9, 1976. After graduating from high school, he joined J1 League club Sanfrecce Hiroshima in 1995. However he could not play at all in the match. In 1995, he moved to Japan Football League club Tosu Futures (later Sagan Tosu). Although he could hardly play in the match in 1996, he became a regular player in 1997. In 1998, he moved to Nagoya Grampus Eight (later Nagoya Grampus). Although he could hardly play in the match until 1999, he played as regular player from 2000. He played many defensive position, mainly, defensive midfielder and side back. Although he played as regular player for a long time until 2007, he lost his opportunity to play for injury in 2008 and retired end of 2008 season.

== Career statistics ==
Appearances and goals by club, season and competition
Club	Season	League			Emperor's Cup		J.League Cup		Total	
Club	Season	Division	Apps	Goals	Apps	Goals	Apps	Goals	Apps	Goals
Sanfrecce Hiroshima	1995	J1 League	0	0	0	0	—		0	0
Tosu Futures	1996	Football League	3	0	3	0	—		6	0
Sagan Tosu	1997	Football League	26	0	3	0	5	0	34	0
Nagoya Grampus Eight	1998	J1 League	7	0	2	0	0	0	9	0
Nagoya Grampus Eight	1999	J1 League	3	0	1	0	1	0	5	0
Nagoya Grampus Eight	2000	J1 League	29	0	2	0	6	0	37	0
Nagoya Grampus Eight	2001	J1 League	25	0	1	0	4	0	30	0
Nagoya Grampus Eight	2002	J1 League	27	0	3	0	6	0	36	0
Nagoya Grampus Eight	2003	J1 League	29	0	2	0	6	0	37	0
Nagoya Grampus Eight	2004	J1 League	19	0	2	0	4	0	25	0
Nagoya Grampus Eight	2005	J1 League	6	0	2	0	0	0	8	0
Nagoya Grampus Eight	2006	J1 League	32	0	2	0	4	0	38	0
Nagoya Grampus Eight	2007	J1 League	31	0	1	0	4	0	36	0
Nagoya Grampus	2008	J1 League	0	0	0	0	0	0	0	0
Career total			237	0	24	0	40	0	301	0
