= 2013 JEF United Chiba season =

JEF United Chiba
2013 season
- Manager: Jun Suzuki
- Stadium: Fukuda Denshi Arena
- J2 League: 5th

2013 JEF United Chiba season.

== J2 League ==
Match	Date	Team	Score	Team	Venue	Attendance
1	2013.03.03	JEF United Chiba	0-1	Consadole Sapporo	Fukuda Denshi Arena	13,583
2	2013.03.10	Roasso Kumamoto	0-3	JEF United Chiba	Umakana-Yokana Stadium	4,409
3	2013.03.17	Tochigi SC	0-0	JEF United Chiba	Tochigi Green Stadium	5,087
4	2013.03.20	JEF United Chiba	1-1	Gainare Tottori	Fukuda Denshi Arena	8,386
5	2013.03.24	Gamba Osaka	1-1	JEF United Chiba	Expo '70 Commemorative Stadium	11,117
6	2013.03.31	JEF United Chiba	6-1	Giravanz Kitakyushu	Fukuda Denshi Arena	7,185
7	2013.04.07	Thespakusatsu Gunma	0-2	JEF United Chiba	Shoda Shoyu Stadium Gunma	5,579
8	2013.04.14	JEF United Chiba	0-0	Fagiano Okayama	Fukuda Denshi Arena	8,406
9	2013.04.17	Mito HollyHock	2-0	JEF United Chiba	K's denki Stadium Mito	2,648
10	2013.04.21	JEF United Chiba	1-1	Avispa Fukuoka	Fukuda Denshi Arena	6,511
11	2013.04.28	Kyoto Sanga FC	3-3	JEF United Chiba	Kyoto Nishikyogoku Athletic Stadium	8,594
12	2013.05.03	JEF United Chiba	2-0	Ehime FC	Fukuda Denshi Arena	10,296
13	2013.05.06	FC Gifu	0-1	JEF United Chiba	Gifu Nagaragawa Stadium	3,215
14	2013.05.12	JEF United Chiba	3-2	Kataller Toyama	Fukuda Denshi Arena	9,399
15	2013.05.19	JEF United Chiba	1-0	Matsumoto Yamaga FC	Fukuda Denshi Arena	12,212
16	2013.05.26	V-Varen Nagasaki	2-1	JEF United Chiba	Nagasaki Stadium	3,452
17	2013.06.01	JEF United Chiba	1-3	Montedio Yamagata	Fukuda Denshi Arena	11,041
18	2013.06.08	Vissel Kobe	2-2	JEF United Chiba	Noevir Stadium Kobe	11,361
19	2013.06.15	JEF United Chiba	1-1	Yokohama FC	Fukuda Denshi Arena	10,144
20	2013.06.22	Tokushima Vortis	1-2	JEF United Chiba	Pocarisweat Stadium	4,190
21	2013.06.29	JEF United Chiba	2-1	Tokyo Verdy	Fukuda Denshi Arena	11,425
22	2013.07.03	Kataller Toyama	1-2	JEF United Chiba	Toyama Stadium	2,905
23	2013.07.07	JEF United Chiba	3-0	Gamba Osaka	Fukuda Denshi Arena	15,982
24	2013.07.14	Montedio Yamagata	0-3	JEF United Chiba	ND Soft Stadium Yamagata	10,020
25	2013.07.20	Ehime FC	0-1	JEF United Chiba	Ningineer Stadium	3,674
26	2013.07.27	JEF United Chiba	1-2	Tokushima Vortis	Fukuda Denshi Arena	8,852
27	2013.08.04	JEF United Chiba	2-0	Mito HollyHock	Fukuda Denshi Arena	9,658
28	2013.08.11	Giravanz Kitakyushu	1-0	JEF United Chiba	Honjo Stadium	2,938
29	2013.08.18	Matsumoto Yamaga FC	3-2	JEF United Chiba	Matsumotodaira Park Stadium	13,044
30	2013.08.21	JEF United Chiba	2-2	Thespakusatsu Gunma	Fukuda Denshi Arena	9,258
31	2013.08.25	JEF United Chiba	1-1	FC Gifu	Fukuda Denshi Arena	10,065
32	2013.09.01	Avispa Fukuoka	3-4	JEF United Chiba	Level5 Stadium	4,552
33	2013.09.15	JEF United Chiba	1-2	Kyoto Sanga FC	Fukuda Denshi Arena	10,187
34	2013.09.23	Tokyo Verdy	1-0	JEF United Chiba	Komazawa Olympic Park Stadium	10,061
35	2013.09.29	Fagiano Okayama	3-0	JEF United Chiba	Kanko Stadium	9,550
36	2013.10.06	JEF United Chiba	2-1	Vissel Kobe	Fukuda Denshi Arena	9,557
37	2013.10.20	JEF United Chiba	6-0	Roasso Kumamoto	Fukuda Denshi Arena	7,345
38	2013.10.27	Yokohama FC	1-2	JEF United Chiba	NHK Spring Mitsuzawa Football Stadium	10,507
39	2013.11.03	Consadole Sapporo	1-0	JEF United Chiba	Sapporo Dome	12,718
40	2013.11.10	JEF United Chiba	0-2	V-Varen Nagasaki	Fukuda Denshi Arena	9,333
41	2013.11.17	JEF United Chiba	1-1	Tochigi SC	Fukuda Denshi Arena	11,253
42	2013.11.24	Gainare Tottori	2-2	JEF United Chiba	Tottori Bank Bird Stadium	3,560
