= Kojiro Kaimoto =

Japanese footballer (born 1977)

Kojiro Kaimoto 海本 幸治郎
Personal information
- Full name: Kojiro Kaimoto
- Date of birth: October 14, 1977 (age 49)
- Place of birth: Suita, Osaka, Japan
- Height: 1.83 m (6 ft 0 in)
- Positions: Defender; midfielder

Youth career
- 1993–1995: Tokai University Gyosei High School

Senior career*
| Years | Team | Apps | (Gls) |
| 1996–2000 | Gamba Osaka | 29 | (1) |
| 2001–2002 | Seongnam Ilhwa Chunma | 11 | (0) |
| 2003–2004 | Nagoya Grampus Eight | 39 | (4) |
| 2005–2006 | Albirex Niigata | 11 | (0) |
| 2006–2008 | Tokyo Verdy | 52 | (1) |
| 2009 | Bonnyrigg White Eagles | 3 | (0) |
| 2009 | North Queensland Fury | 2 | (0) |
| Total | | 147 | (6) |
- * Club domestic league appearances and goals

Kojiro Kaimoto (海本 幸治郎, Kaimoto Kojiro; born October 14, 1977) is a former Japanese football player. His elder brother Keiji is also a former footballer.

== Early years ==
Kaimoto was born in Suita on October 14, 1977.

== Club career ==
He joined his local club, Gamba Osaka, in 1996. He played as a midfielder during the first season. Although he played often at first, he did not play at all in 1999 due to injuries. In 2001, he moved to the South Korean team Seongnam Ilhwa Chunma. The club won the championship two years in a row (2001-2002). In 2003, he returned to Japan and joined Nagoya Grampus Eight. His brother Keiji also played for the club. He played often as a right-side midfielder over two seasons. In 2005, he moved to the Albirex Niigata with Keiji. However he did not play as often. In June 2006, he moved to the J2 League club Tokyo Verdy. He played often as a right-side back and right midfielder. The club was promoted to the J1 League in 2008. However, he did not play much in 2008. Toward the end of his career, he played for the Australian clubs Bonnyrigg White Eagles and North Queensland Fury in 2009. He retired in October 2009.

== Career statistics ==
=== Club ===
| Club performance | | | League | | Cup | | League Cup | | Total | |
| Season | Club | League | Apps | Goals | Apps | Goals | Apps | Goals | Apps | Goals |
| Japan | | | League | | Emperor's Cup | | J.League Cup | | Total | |
|---|---|---|---|---|---|---|---|---|---|---|
| 1996 | Gamba Osaka | J1 League | 5 | 0 | 0 | 0 | 5 | 0 | 10 | 0 |
| 1997 | Gamba Osaka | J1 League | 11 | 1 | 0 | 0 | 2 | 0 | 13 | 1 |
| 1998 | Gamba Osaka | J1 League | 13 | 0 | 0 | 0 | 0 | 0 | 13 | 0 |
| 1999 | Gamba Osaka | J1 League | 0 | 0 | 0 | 0 | 0 | 0 | 0 | 0 |
| 2000 | Gamba Osaka | J1 League | 0 | 0 | 0 | 0 | 0 | 0 | 0 | 0 |
| 2003 | Nagoya Grampus Eight | J1 League | 18 | 2 | 1 | 0 | 2 | 0 | 21 | 2 |
| 2004 | Nagoya Grampus Eight | J1 League | 21 | 2 | 0 | 0 | 7 | 0 | 28 | 2 |
| 2005 | Albirex Niigata | J1 League | 6 | 0 | 0 | 0 | 5 | 0 | 11 | 0 |
| 2006 | Albirex Niigata | J1 League | 5 | 0 | 0 | 0 | 1 | 0 | 6 | 0 |
| 2006 | Tokyo Verdy | J2 League | 26 | 1 | 1 | 0 | - | | 27 | 1 |
| 2007 | Tokyo Verdy | J2 League | 26 | 0 | 0 | 0 | - | | 26 | 0 |
| 2008 | Tokyo Verdy | J1 League | 0 | 0 | 0 | 0 | 0 | 0 | 0 | 0 |
| Total | | | 131 | 6 | 2 | 0 | 22 | 0 | 155 | 6 |
