= Yutaka Akita =

Japanese footballer and manager

Yutaka Akita 秋田 豊
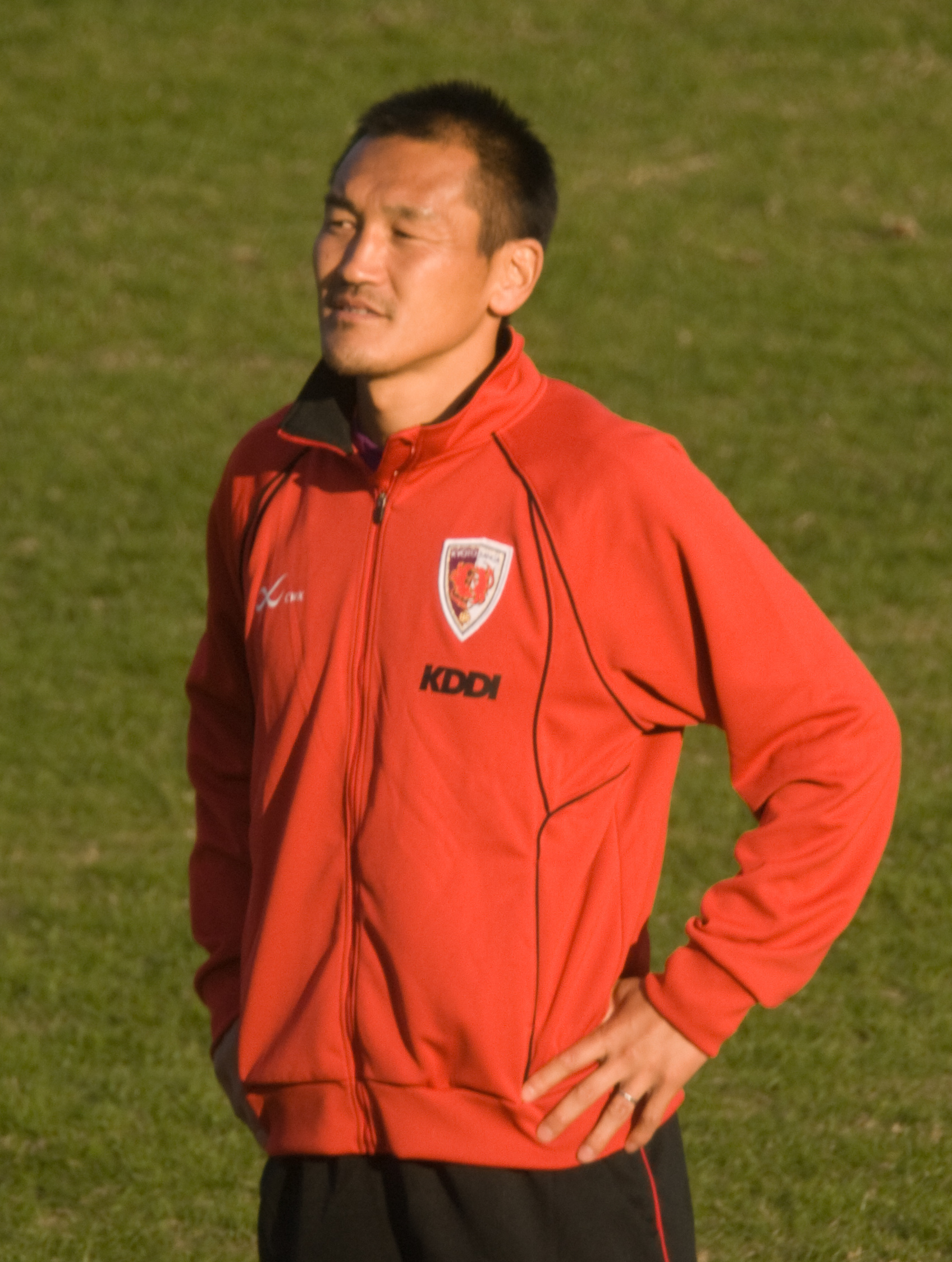

Personal information
- Date of birth: 6 August 1970 (age 56)
- Place of birth: Nagoya, Aichi, Japan
- Height: 1.80 m (5 ft 11 in)
- Position: Defender

Team information
- Current team: Kochi United (manager)

Youth career
- Hosei Junior High School
- 1986–1988: Aichi High School

College career
Years	Team	Apps	(Gls)
1989–1992	Aichi Gakuin University		

Senior career*
Years	Team	Apps	(Gls)
1993–2003	Kashima Antlers	334	(20)
2004–2006	Nagoya Grampus Eight	57	(3)
2007	Kyoto Sanga	14	(0)
Total		405	(23)

International career
1995–2003	Japan	44	(4)

Managerial career
- 2010: Kyoto Sanga
- 2012–2013: Machida Zelvia
- 2020–2022: Iwate Grulla Morioka
- 2025–: Kochi United
Medal record
Kashima Antlers
Winner	J1 League	1996
Winner	J1 League	1998
Winner	J1 League	2000
Winner	J1 League	2001
Runner-up	J1 League	1993
Runner-up	J1 League	1997
Winner	J.League Cup	1997
Winner	J.League Cup	2000
Winner	J.League Cup	2002
Runner-up	J.League Cup	1999
Runner-up	J.League Cup	2003
Winner	Emperor's Cup	1997
Winner	Emperor's Cup	2000
Runner-up	Emperor's Cup	1993
Runner-up	Emperor's Cup	2002
- * Club domestic league appearances and goals

Yutaka Akita (秋田 豊, Akita Yutaka; born 6 August 1970) is a Japanese football manager and former player who played as a defender. He is currently manager of J3 League club Kochi United.

He played for Japan national team until 2003.

== Club career ==
Akita is a strong and physical centre-back. A 10-year stalwart for the Kashima Antlers since 1993, Akita left Kashima in early 2004 to move back to his native Nagoya, signing for hometown team Nagoya Grampus Eight. He moved to J2 League side Kyoto Sanga FC at the beginning of the 2007 season. In November 2007, he announced his retirement from the game. Akita won the champions J1 League 4 times, J.League Cup 3 times and Emperor's Cup 2 times at Kashima Antlers. He was selected Best Eleven 4 times.

== International career ==
On 24 October 1995, Akita debuted for Japan national team against Saudi Arabia. He played at 1996 Asian Cup. He became a regular from the middle of 1997 and at 1998 World Cup qualification in 1997, Japan won the qualify for 1998 World Cup first time Japan's history. He played at 1998 World Cup and 1999 Copa América. He played full-time in all matches at both competitions. In 2002, he was selected Japan for the first time in 3 years. He was also selected Japan for 2002 World Cup, but he did not play in the match. After 2002 World Cup, he became a regular player again under new manager Zico. On 8 June 2003, the match against Argentina is his last game for Japan. Although he was a member of Japan for 2003 Confederations Cup in June, he did not play in the match. He played 44 games and scored 4 goals for Japan until 2003.

== Managerial career ==
After retirement, Akita started his coaching career at Kyoto Sanga FC in 2008.In July 2010, he became manager, succeeding Hisashi Kato. However the club was relegated to J2 League and he resigned at the end of the season.

He signed with Tokyo Verdy in 2012. In November, he resigned and became manager of FC Machida Zelvia. He was sacked in June 2013.

On 4 December 2019, Akita was officially announced as manager of Iwate Grulla Morioka from the 2020 season. On 6 December 2021, Akita gained promotion to the J2 League for the first time in their history after the club drew against Azul Claro Numazu 1-1 in the final matchweek. Akita left the club in 2022 season after his club was relegated to the J3 League.

On 22 December 2024, Akita was officially announced as manager of newly promoted J3 club Kochi United.

== Career statistics ==
=== Club ===
Appearances and goals by club, season and competition
Club	Season	League		Emperor's Cup		J. League Cup		Asia		Total	
Club	Season	Apps	Goals	Apps	Goals	Apps	Goals	Apps	Goals	Apps	Goals
Kashima Antlers	1993	35	0	5	2	5	1	–		45	3
Kashima Antlers	1994	38	4	0	0	1	0	–		39	4
Kashima Antlers	1995	50	0	4	0	–		–		54	0
Kashima Antlers	1996	16	0	3	0	4	0	–		23	0
Kashima Antlers	1997	21	3	5	1	2	2	–		28	6
Kashima Antlers	1998	32	3	4	0	1	0	–		37	3
Kashima Antlers	1999	28	2	2	0	6	1	–		36	3
Kashima Antlers	2000	28	1	4	1	7	0	–		39	2
Kashima Antlers	2001	29	2	2	0	6	1	–		37	3
Kashima Antlers	2002	29	4	5	1	8	0	–		42	5
Kashima Antlers	2003	28	1	4	1	5	0	3	0	40	2
Nagoya Grampus Eight	2004	26	0	2	0	7	0	–		35	0
Nagoya Grampus Eight	2005	19	1	2	0	0	0	–		21	1
Nagoya Grampus Eight	2006	12	2	1	0	3	0	–		16	2
Kyoto Sanga FC	2007	14	0	0	0	–		–		14	0
Total		405	23	43	6	55	5	3	0	506	34

=== International ===
Appearances and goals by national team and year
National team	Year	Apps	Goals
Japan	1995	2	1
Japan	1996	2	0
Japan	1997	16	2
Japan	1998	10	0
Japan	1999	7	0
Japan	2000	0	0
Japan	2001	0	0
Japan	2002	3	0
Japan	2003	4	1
Total		44	4

Scores and results list Japan's goal tally first, score column indicates score after each Akita goal.

List of international goals scored by Yutaka Akita
No.	Date	Venue	Opponent	Score	Result	Competition
1	28 October 1995	Matsuyama, Japan	Saudi Arabia	2–1	2–1	Friendly
2	4 October 1997	Almaty, Kazakhstan	Kazakhstan	1–0	1–1	1998 FIFA World Cup qualification
3	25 November 1997	Tokyo, Japan	Kazakhstan	1–0	5–1	1998 FIFA World Cup qualification
4	8 June 2003	Osaka, Japan	Argentina	1–2	1–4	2003 Kirin Cup

== Managerial statistics ==
As of the match played 16 February 2025.

Team	From	To	Record				
Team	From	To	G	W	D	L	Win %
Kyoto Sanga	2010		20	2	3	15	10.00
Machida Zelvia	2013		17	9	4	4	52.94
Iwate Grulla Morioka	2020	2022	104	35	24	45	33.65
Kochi United	2025	present	1	0	0	1	0.00
Total			142	46	31	65	32.39

== Honours ==
=== Player ===
Kashima Antlers

- J1 League: 1996, 1998, 2000, 2002
- J.League Cup: 1997, 2000, 2002
- Emperor's Cup: 1997, 2000

Individual

- J1 League Best Eleven: 1997, 1998, 2000, 2001
- Selected to AFC All Star Team: 1998

=== Manager ===
Iwate Grulla Morioka

- J3 League runner-up: 2021
