= 2002 Nagoya Grampus Eight season =

Nagoya Grampus Eight
2002 season
- Manager: Zdenko Verdenik
- Stadium: Mizuho Athletic Stadium
- J. League 1: 6th
- Emperor's Cup: Quarterfinals
- J. League Cup: GL-D 3rd
- Top goalscorer: Ueslei (20)
Home colours	Away colours	Third colours

The 2002 Nagoya Grampus Eight football season was as follows.

== Competitions ==
Competitions	Position
J. League 1	6th / 16 clubs
Emperor's Cup	Quarterfinals
J. League Cup	GL-D 3rd / 4 clubs

== Domestic results ==
=== J. League 1 ===
Match	Date	Venue	Opponents	Score
1-1	2002.3.2	Shizuoka Stadium	Júbilo Iwata	0-2
1-2	2002.3.9	Toyota Stadium	Yokohama F. Marinos	0-1
1-3	2002.3.16	Mizuho Athletic Stadium	Tokyo Verdy 1969	1-0
1-4	2002.3.31	Mizuho Athletic Stadium	Consadole Sapporo	0-3
1-5	2002.4.6	Nihondaira Sports Stadium	Shimizu S-Pulse	4-0
1-6	2002.4.13	Toyota Stadium	Kashiwa Reysol	2-0
1-7	2002.4.20	Mizuho Athletic Stadium	Kyoto Purple Sanga	0-1
1-8	2002.7.13	Matsumoto Stadium	JEF United Ichihara	4-3 a.e.t. (sudden death)
1-9	2002.7.21	Osaka Expo '70 Stadium	Gamba Osaka	2-3 a.e.t. (sudden death)
1-10	2002.7.24	Mizuho Athletic Stadium	Vissel Kobe	4-1
1-11	2002.7.27	Hiroshima Big Arch	Sanfrecce Hiroshima	1-0
1-12	2002.8.3	Toyota Stadium	Kashima Antlers	2-1
1-13	2002.8.7	Sendai Stadium	Vegalta Sendai	4-1
1-14	2002.8.10	Mizuho Athletic Stadium	Urawa Red Diamonds	2-1
1-15	2002.8.17	Tokyo Stadium	F.C. Tokyo	2-1
2-1	2002.9.1	Mizuho Athletic Stadium	Shimizu S-Pulse	3-0
2-2	2002.9.7	Hitachi Kashiwa Soccer Stadium	Kashiwa Reysol	1-1 a.e.t.
2-3	2002.9.14	Mizuho Athletic Stadium	JEF United Ichihara	3-1
2-4	2002.9.18	Kobe Universiade Memorial Stadium	Vissel Kobe	0-2
2-5	2002.9.21	Toyota Stadium	Gamba Osaka	0-1
2-6	2002.9.28	Tokyo Stadium	Tokyo Verdy 1969	2-3
2-7	2002.10.6	Kashima Soccer Stadium	Kashima Antlers	1-4
2-8	2002.10.13	Mizuho Athletic Stadium	Sanfrecce Hiroshima	3-1
2-9	2002.10.19	Saitama Stadium 2002	Urawa Red Diamonds	1-2 a.e.t. (sudden death)
2-10	2002.10.23	Mizuho Athletic Stadium	Vegalta Sendai	3-1
2-11	2002.10.26	Nishikyogoku Athletic Stadium	Kyoto Purple Sanga	1-2 a.e.t. (sudden death)
2-12	2002.11.9	Mizuho Athletic Stadium	F.C. Tokyo	1-0
2-13	2002.11.17	Sapporo Dome	Consadole Sapporo	0-1
2-14	2002.11.23	International Stadium Yokohama	Yokohama F. Marinos	0-1
2-15	2002.11.30	Toyota Stadium	Júbilo Iwata	2-3

=== Emperor's Cup ===
Match	Date	Venue	Opponents	Score
3rd Round	2002..			-
4th Round	2002..			-
Quarterfinals	2002..			-

=== J. League Cup ===
Match	Date	Venue	Opponents	Score
GL-D-1	2002..			-
GL-D-2	2002..			-
GL-D-3	2002..			-
GL-D-4	2002..			-
GL-D-5	2002..			-
GL-D-6	2002..			-

== Player statistics ==
No.	Pos.	Player	D.o.B. (Age)	Height / Weight	J. League 1		Emperor's Cup		J. League Cup		Total	
No.	Pos.	Player	D.o.B. (Age)	Height / Weight	Apps	Goals	Apps	Goals	Apps	Goals	Apps	Goals
1	GK	Seigo Narazaki	April 15, 1976 (aged 25)	cm / kg	30	0						
2	DF	Keiji Kaimoto	November 26, 1972 (aged 29)	cm / kg	12	0						
3	DF	Yasunari Hiraoka	March 13, 1972 (aged 29)	cm / kg	8	0						
4	DF	Masayuki Omori	November 9, 1976 (aged 25)	cm / kg	27	0						
5	DF	Masahiro Koga	September 8, 1978 (aged 23)	cm / kg	28	1						
6	MF	Motohiro Yamaguchi	January 29, 1969 (aged 33)	cm / kg	25	2						
7	MF	Tarik Oulida	January 19, 1974 (aged 28)	cm / kg	5	1						
8	MF	Tomoyuki Sakai	June 29, 1979 (aged 22)	cm / kg	29	1						
9	FW	Marcelo Ramos	June 25, 1973 (aged 28)	cm / kg	7	3						
9	FW	Ivica Vastić	September 29, 1969 (aged 32)	cm / kg	18	10						
10	FW	Ueslei	April 19, 1972 (aged 29)	cm / kg	27	20						
11	DF	Naoki Hiraoka	May 24, 1973 (aged 28)	cm / kg	12	1						
13	MF	Kunihiko Takizawa	April 20, 1978 (aged 23)	cm / kg	29	0						
14	MF	Naoshi Nakamura	January 27, 1979 (aged 23)	cm / kg	29	4						
15	FW	Yasuyuki Moriyama	May 1, 1969 (aged 32)	cm / kg	7	0						
16	GK	Seiji Honda	February 25, 1976 (aged 26)	cm / kg	0	0						
17	DF	Yusuke Nakatani	September 22, 1978 (aged 23)	cm / kg	11	1						
18	DF	Junji Nishizawa	May 10, 1974 (aged 27)	cm / kg	2	0						
19	DF	Ko Ishikawa	March 10, 1970 (aged 31)	cm / kg	1	0						
20	FW	Ryuta Hara	April 19, 1981 (aged 20)	cm / kg	18	5						
21	MF	Tetsuya Okayama	August 27, 1973 (aged 28)	cm / kg	28	0						
22	GK	Yasuhiro Tominaga	May 22, 1980 (aged 21)	cm / kg	0	0						
23	GK	Kazuki Sawada	June 5, 1982 (aged 19)	cm / kg	0	0						
24	DF	Takafumi Yoshimoto	May 13, 1978 (aged 23)	cm / kg	0	0						
25	MF	Keiji Yoshimura	August 8, 1979 (aged 22)	cm / kg	2	0						
26	DF	Taisei Fujita	January 31, 1982 (aged 20)	cm / kg	0	0						
27	MF	Hiroki Mihara	April 20, 1978 (aged 23)	cm / kg	0	0						
28	MF	Kenji Hada	June 27, 1981 (aged 20)	cm / kg	0	0						
29	MF	Taku Harada	October 27, 1982 (aged 19)	cm / kg	3	0						
30	FW	Atsushi Katagiri	August 1, 1983 (aged 18)	cm / kg	5	0						
31	MF	Kei Yamaguchi	June 11, 1983 (aged 18)	cm / kg	17	0						
32	DF	Yuki Yamauchi	May 10, 1982 (aged 19)	cm / kg	0	0						
33	MF	Chong Yong-De	February 4, 1978 (aged 24)	cm / kg	0	0						
37	DF	Andrej Panadić	March 9, 1969 (aged 32)	cm / kg	22	0						

== Other pages ==
- (in Japanese) J. League official site
