= Riki Takasaki =

Japanese footballer

Riki Takasaki 高嵜 理貴
Personal information
- Full name: Riki Takasaki
- Date of birth: July 11, 1970 (age 56)
- Place of birth: Fukuoka, Japan
- Height: 1.82 m (5 ft 11 1/2 in)
- Position: Goalkeeper

Youth career
- 1986–1988: Hokuchiku High School
- 1989–1992: Nippon Sport Science University

Senior career*
| Years | Team | Apps | (Gls) |
| 1993–2000 | Sagan Tosu | 134 | (0) |
| 2001 | JEF United Ichihara | 1 | (0) |
| 2002–2003 | Kashima Antlers | 0 | (0) |
| 2004–2005 | Oita Trinita | 23 | (0) |
| 2006 | Nagoya Grampus Eight | 0 | (0) |
| Total | | 158 | (0) |
Medal record
Kashima Antlers
| Winner | J.League Cup | 2002 |
| Runner-up | J.League Cup | 2003 |
| Runner-up | Emperor's Cup | 2002 |
- * Club domestic league appearances and goals

Riki Takasaki (高嵜 理貴, Takasaki Riki; born July 11, 1970) is a former Japanese football player.

== Playing career ==
Takasaki was born in Fukuoka Prefecture on July 11, 1970. After graduating from Nippon Sport Science University, he joined Japan Football League club PJM Futures (later Tosu Futures, Sagan Tosu) in 1993. However he could hardly play in the match until 1996. In 1997, he became a regular goalkeeper and the club was promoted to new league J2 League from 1999. After he played many matches as regular goalkeeper in 4 seasons, he moved to J1 League club JEF United Ichihara in 2001. However he could hardly play in the match behind Ryo Kushino. In 2002, he moved to Kashima Antlers. However he could hardly play in the match behind Japan national team goalkeeper Hitoshi Sogahata. In 2004, he moved to Oita Trinita. He battles with Hayato Okanaka for the position and he played many matches in 2004. However he could hardly play in the match behind newcomer Shusaku Nishikawa in 2005. In 2006, he moved to Nagoya Grampus Eight. However he could not play at all in the match and retired end of 2006 season.

== Club statistics ==
| Club performance | | | League | | Cup | | League Cup | | Continental | | Total | |
| Season | Club | League | Apps | Goals | Apps | Goals | Apps | Goals | Apps | Goals | Apps | Goals |
| Japan | | | League | | Emperor's Cup | | J.League Cup | | Asia | | Total | |
|---|---|---|---|---|---|---|---|---|---|---|---|---|
| 1993 | PJM Futures | Football League | 1 | 0 | - | | - | | - | | 1 | 0 |
| 1994 | PJM Futures | Football League | 1 | 0 | 0 | 0 | - | | - | | 1 | 0 |
| 1995 | Tosu Futures | Football League | 1 | 0 | 0 | 0 | - | | - | | 1 | 0 |
| 1996 | Tosu Futures | Football League | 0 | 0 | 1 | 0 | - | | - | | 1 | 0 |
| 1997 | Sagan Tosu | Football League | 30 | 0 | 3 | 0 | 3 | 0 | - | | 36 | 0 |
| 1998 | Sagan Tosu | Football League | 30 | 0 | 3 | 0 | - | | - | | 33 | 0 |
| 1999 | Sagan Tosu | J2 League | 34 | 0 | 3 | 0 | 1 | 0 | - | | 38 | 0 |
| 2000 | Sagan Tosu | J2 League | 37 | 0 | 3 | 0 | 2 | 0 | - | | 42 | 0 |
| 2001 | JEF United Ichihara | J1 League | 1 | 0 | 0 | 0 | 0 | 0 | - | | 1 | 0 |
| 2002 | Kashima Antlers | J1 League | 0 | 0 | 1 | 0 | 6 | 0 | - | | 7 | 0 |
| 2003 | Kashima Antlers | J1 League | 0 | 0 | 0 | 0 | 0 | 0 | 3 | 0 | 3 | 0 |
| 2004 | Oita Trinita | J1 League | 20 | 0 | 2 | 0 | 5 | 0 | - | | 27 | 0 |
| 2005 | Oita Trinita | J1 League | 3 | 0 | 0 | 0 | 0 | 0 | - | | 3 | 0 |
| 2006 | Nagoya Grampus Eight | J1 League | 0 | 0 | 0 | 0 | 0 | 0 | - | | 0 | 0 |
| Career total | | | 158 | 0 | 16 | 0 | 17 | 0 | 3 | 0 | 194 | 0 |
