= Seigo Narazaki =

Japanese football player (born 1976)

Seigo Narazaki 楢﨑 正剛
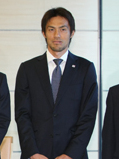

Personal information
- Full name: Seigo Narazaki
- Date of birth: 15 April 1976 (age 50)
- Place of birth: Kashiba, Nara, Japan
- Height: 1.87 m (6 ft 2 in)
- Position: Goalkeeper

Youth career
- 1992–1994: Nara Ikuei High School

Senior career*
Years	Team	Apps	(Gls)
1995–1998	Yokohama Flügels	104	(0)
1999–2018	Nagoya Grampus	556	(0)
Total		660	(0)

International career
2000	Japan Olympic (O.P.)	4	(0)
1998–2010	Japan	77	(0)
Medal record
Men's football
Representing Japan
AFC Asian Cup
Winner	2004 China
FIFA Confederations Cup
Runner-up	2001 Korea/Japan
- * Club domestic league appearances and goals

Seigo Narazaki (楢﨑 正剛, Narazaki Seigō; born 15 April 1976) is a Japanese former professional footballer who played as a goalkeeper. He played for the Japan national team. Narazaki is the second highest number of J.League all-time appearances in history with 631 appearances.

== Club career ==
=== Yokohama Flügels ===
After graduating from Nara Ikuei High School in 1995, Narazaki joined the J1 League side Yokohama Flügels. In August 1995, regular goalkeeper Atsuhiko Mori was suspended for three months due to violence against referee. On 16 August 1995, Narazaki debuted against Bellmare Hiratsuka to replace Mori and Narazaki became the regular goalkeeper. In the 1996 season, Flügels finished in third place and Narazaki was also selected in the Best Eleven award. He contributed to the club winning the 1998 Emperor's Cup. However, Flügels was merged with cross-town team Yokohama Marinos and Flügels was dissolved at the end of the 1998 season.

=== Nagoya Grampus ===
In 1999, Narazaki moved to Nagoya Grampus Eight (later Nagoya Grampus) with Flügels teammate Motohiro Yamaguchi. In 1999, Grampus were the champions of the Emperor's Cup for two years in a row, the second time in two years for Narazaki. In 2008, Grampus appointed new manager Dragan Stojković who played for Grampus until 2001. Grampus, under Stojković, reached third place in the J1 League and Narazaki was selected in the Best Eleven award. In 2010, Grampus won the J1 League and were champions for the first time in the club's history. Narazaki also became the first goalkeeper to receive the J.League Most Valuable Player award. In 2016 season, Grampus finished in 16th place of 18 clubs and was relegated to J2 League for the first time in the club history. In the 2017 J2 League season, the club finished third and were returned to the top flight. However, his opportunities to play decreased behind Yohei Takeda until summer. In 2018, Narazaki was effectively relegated to second choice behind new Australian signing Mitchell Langerak and did not make a single appearance.

Narazaki announced his retirement from football on 8 January 2019. He was 42 years old.

== International career ==
On 15 February 1998, Narazaki made his international debut for Japan national team against Australia. After the debut, he battles with Yoshikatsu Kawaguchi for the position for 10 years. He was selected Japan for 1998 World Cup. However, Kawaguchi played all three of Japan's matches at the tournament.

In 2000, Narazaki was selected Japan U23 national team as over age for 2000 Summer Olympics and played full time in all 4 matches. Although he could hardly play in the match in 2001, he played many matches in 2002. At 2002 World Cup in Japan, he played all 4 matches and Japan qualified to the knockout stage first time in their history.

Narazaki played many matches as regular goalkeeper until summer 2004. Although he was selected Japan for 2004 Asian Cup, he could not play for injury. His rival Kawaguchi performed brilliantly at Asian Cup and Japan won the champions. After Asian Cup, Narazaki lost regular position behind Kawaguchi. Although Narazaki was selected Japan for 2006 World Cup, he did not play in a match.

Although Narazaki could not play many matches until 2007, he became a regular goalkeeper because Kawaguchi was injured in 2008. Narazaki was named in the 2010 World Cup squad as one of two Japanese players (the other being Kawaguchi) to be selected for 4 consecutive World Cups. However, despite performing impressively in the qualifiers, he was benched for the tournament in favour of his former understudy Eiji Kawashima. He would make one last appearance for Japan when he captained the team to a 2–1 victory over Guatemala on 7 September 2010 before retiring from international duty. He played 77 games for Japan.

== Career statistics ==
=== Club ===
Appearances and goals by club, season and competition
Club	Season	League			National Cup		League Cup		Continental		Total	
Club	Season	Division	Apps	Goals	Apps	Goals	Apps	Goals	Apps	Goals	Apps	Goals
Yokohama Flügels	1995	J1 League	23	0	2	0	—		—		25	0
Yokohama Flügels	1996	J1 League	23	0	2	0	14	0	—		39	0
Yokohama Flügels	1997	J1 League	24	0	5	0	7	0	—		36	0
Yokohama Flügels	1998	J1 League	34	0	5	0	0	0	—		39	0
Yokohama Flügels	Total		104	0	14	0	21	0	—		139	0
Nagoya Grampus Eight	1999	J1 League	25	0	5	0	4	0	—		34	0
Nagoya Grampus Eight	2000	J1 League	30	0	2	0	2	0	—		34	0
Nagoya Grampus Eight	2001	J1 League	28	0	1	0	6	0	—		35	0
Nagoya Grampus Eight	2002	J1 League	30	0	3	0	0	0	—		33	0
Nagoya Grampus Eight	2003	J1 League	28	0	2	0	6	0	—		36	0
Nagoya Grampus Eight	2004	J1 League	26	0	2	0	0	0	—		28	0
Nagoya Grampus Eight	2005	J1 League	32	0	1	0	0	0	—		33	0
Nagoya Grampus Eight	2006	J1 League	24	0	2	0	2	0	—		28	0
Nagoya Grampus Eight	2007	J1 League	29	0	2	0	4	0	—		35	0
Nagoya Grampus	2008	J1 League	30	0	1	0	2	0	—		33	0
Nagoya Grampus	2009	J1 League	26	0	3	0	0	0	6	0	35	0
Nagoya Grampus	2010	J1 League	34	0	0	0	0	0	—		34	0
Nagoya Grampus	2011	J1 League	24	0	3	0	2	0	6	0	34	0
Nagoya Grampus	2012	J1 League	32	0	4	0	1	0	7	0	34	0
Nagoya Grampus	2013	J1 League	34	0	1	0	6	0	—		41	0
Nagoya Grampus	2014	J1 League	34	0	2	0	6	0	—		42	0
Nagoya Grampus	2015	J1 League	34	0	0	0	6	0	—		40	0
Nagoya Grampus	2016	J1 League	27	0	1	0	3	0	—		31	0
Nagoya Grampus	2017	J2 League	29	0	0	0	—		—		29	0
Nagoya Grampus	2018	J1 League	0	0	0	0	0	0	—		0	0
Nagoya Grampus	Total		556	0	35	0	50	0	19	0	660	0
Career total			660	0	49	0	71	0	19	0	799	0

=== International ===
Appearances and goals by national team and year
National team	Year	Apps	Goals
Japan	1998	2	0
Japan	1999	3	0
Japan	2000	9	0
Japan	2001	1	0
Japan	2002	10	0
Japan	2003	12	0
Japan	2004	9	0
Japan	2005	4	0
Japan	2006	0	0
Japan	2007	1	0
Japan	2008	12	0
Japan	2009	6	0
Japan	2010	8	0
Total		77	0

== Honors ==
=== Club ===
Yokohama Flügels

- Emperor's Cup: 1998

Nagoya Grampus

- J1 League: 2010
- Emperor's Cup: 1999
- Japanese Super Cup: 2011

=== International ===
Japan

- AFC Asian Cup: 2004

=== Individual ===
- J.League Most Valuable Player: 2010
- J.League Best Eleven: 1996, 1998, 2003, 2008, 2010, 2011
