= 2014 Avispa Fukuoka season =

Avispa Fukuoka
2014 season
- Manager: Marijan Pušnik
- Stadium: Level5 Stadium
- J2 League: 16th

2014 Avispa Fukuoka season.

== J2 League ==
Match	Date	Team	Score	Team	Venue	Attendance
1	2014.03.02	Roasso Kumamoto	2-1	Avispa Fukuoka	Umakana-Yokana Stadium	9,679
2	2014.03.09	Avispa Fukuoka	1-0	Kyoto Sanga FC	Level5 Stadium	5,499
3	2014.03.16	Avispa Fukuoka	1-1	Ehime FC	Level5 Stadium	3,742
4	2014.03.22	Júbilo Iwata	3-3	Avispa Fukuoka	Yamaha Stadium	7,912
5	2014.03.30	Avispa Fukuoka	1-0	Yokohama FC	Level5 Stadium	5,181
6	2014.04.05	FC Gifu	1-2	Avispa Fukuoka	Gifu Nagaragawa Stadium	5,022
7	2014.04.13	Avispa Fukuoka	2-5	V-Varen Nagasaki	Level5 Stadium	4,833
8	2014.04.20	Kamatamare Sanuki	1-1	Avispa Fukuoka	Kagawa Marugame Stadium	2,015
9	2014.04.26	Thespakusatsu Gunma	1-2	Avispa Fukuoka	Shoda Shoyu Stadium Gunma	2,100
10	2014.04.29	Avispa Fukuoka	0-1	Giravanz Kitakyushu	Level5 Stadium	7,875
11	2014.05.03	Avispa Fukuoka	1-2	Oita Trinita	Level5 Stadium	6,614
12	2014.05.06	Fagiano Okayama	1-1	Avispa Fukuoka	Kanko Stadium	10,743
13	2014.05.11	Avispa Fukuoka	2-1	Kataller Toyama	Level5 Stadium	5,708
14	2014.05.18	Shonan Bellmare	2-0	Avispa Fukuoka	Shonan BMW Stadium Hiratsuka	8,069
15	2014.05.24	Avispa Fukuoka	0-1	Montedio Yamagata	Level5 Stadium	3,583
16	2014.05.31	Consadole Sapporo	1-1	Avispa Fukuoka	Sapporo Atsubetsu Stadium	8,851
17	2014.06.07	Avispa Fukuoka	1-0	JEF United Chiba	Level5 Stadium	6,359
18	2014.06.14	Tokyo Verdy	0-5	Avispa Fukuoka	Komazawa Olympic Park Stadium	3,406
19	2014.06.21	Mito HollyHock	1-2	Avispa Fukuoka	K's denki Stadium Mito	6,065
20	2014.06.28	Avispa Fukuoka	2-0	Tochigi SC	Level5 Stadium	4,211
21	2014.07.05	Matsumoto Yamaga FC	2-1	Avispa Fukuoka	Matsumotodaira Park Stadium	11,418
22	2014.07.20	Avispa Fukuoka	2-3	Fagiano Okayama	Level5 Stadium	5,482
23	2014.07.26	Kyoto Sanga FC	3-1	Avispa Fukuoka	Kyoto Nishikyogoku Athletic Stadium	5,810
24	2014.07.30	Avispa Fukuoka	0-0	Shonan Bellmare	Level5 Stadium	3,883
25	2014.08.03	Ehime FC	0-0	Avispa Fukuoka	Ningineer Stadium	2,819
26	2014.08.10	Avispa Fukuoka	3-1	Júbilo Iwata	Level5 Stadium	6,210
27	2014.08.17	V-Varen Nagasaki	0-0	Avispa Fukuoka	Nagasaki Stadium	5,231
28	2014.08.24	Avispa Fukuoka	1-0	FC Gifu	Level5 Stadium	4,095
29	2014.08.31	Yokohama FC	2-0	Avispa Fukuoka	NHK Spring Mitsuzawa Football Stadium	3,709
30	2014.09.06	Giravanz Kitakyushu	3-5	Avispa Fukuoka	Honjo Stadium	6,516
31	2014.09.14	Avispa Fukuoka	0-1	Mito HollyHock	Level5 Stadium	4,651
32	2014.09.20	Oita Trinita	3-0	Avispa Fukuoka	Oita Bank Dome	7,731
33	2014.09.23	Avispa Fukuoka	0-1	Tokyo Verdy	Level5 Stadium	4,252
34	2014.09.28	Kataller Toyama	1-2	Avispa Fukuoka	Toyama Stadium	4,005
35	2014.10.04	JEF United Chiba	3-0	Avispa Fukuoka	Fukuda Denshi Arena	7,884
36	2014.10.11	Avispa Fukuoka	1-2	Kamatamare Sanuki	Level5 Stadium	4,260
37	2014.10.19	Avispa Fukuoka	1-1	Thespakusatsu Gunma	Level5 Stadium	4,096
38	2014.10.26	Tochigi SC	1-1	Avispa Fukuoka	Tochigi Green Stadium	3,602
39	2014.11.01	Avispa Fukuoka	1-2	Matsumoto Yamaga FC	Level5 Stadium	4,526
40	2014.11.09	Montedio Yamagata	2-1	Avispa Fukuoka	ND Soft Stadium Yamagata	5,897
41	2014.11.15	Avispa Fukuoka	2-2	Consadole Sapporo	Level5 Stadium	3,444
42	2014.11.23	Avispa Fukuoka	1-3	Roasso Kumamoto	Level5 Stadium	7,799
