= Naoshi Nakamura =

Japanese footballer

Naoshi Nakamura 中村 直志
Personal information
- Full name: Naoshi Nakamura
- Date of birth: January 27, 1979 (age 47)
- Place of birth: Funabashi, Chiba, Japan
- Height: 1.76 m (5 ft 9 1/2 in)
- Position: Midfielder

Youth career
- 1994–1996: Funabashi High School
- 1997–2000: Nihon University

Senior career*
Years	Team	Apps	(Gls)
2001–2014	Nagoya Grampus	342	(30)
Total		342	(30)

International career
2006	Japan	1	(0)
Medal record
Nagoya Grampus
Winner	J1 League	2010
Runner-up	J1 League	2011
Runner-up	Emperor's Cup	2009
- * Club domestic league appearances and goals

Naoshi Nakamura (中村 直志, Nakamura Naoshi; born January 27, 1979) is a former Japanese football player. He played for Japan national team.

== Club career ==
Nakamura was born in Funabashi on January 27, 1979. After graduating from Nihon University, he joined Nagoya Grampus Eight (later Nagoya Grampus) in 2001. He became a regular player in 2002. Although he was originally offensive midfielder, he also played many matches as defensive midfielder and right side midfielder. From 2008, he played as defensive midfielder under new manager Dragan Stojković. The club won the 3rd place 2008 J1 League and the 2nd place 2009 Emperor's Cup. In 2010, the club won the champions 2010 J1 League their first league champions. In 2011, the club also won the 2nd place J1 League. From 2012, his opportunity to play decreased and he retired end of 2014 season.

== National team career ==
Nakamura's only appearance for Japan came on August 9, 2006, in a friendly against Trinidad and Tobago.

== Club statistics ==
Club performance			League		Cup		League Cup		Continental		Total	
Season	Club	League	Apps	Goals	Apps	Goals	Apps	Goals	Apps	Goals	Apps	Goals
Japan			League		Emperor's Cup		J.League Cup		Asia		Total	
2001	Nagoya Grampus Eight	J1 League	11	1	0	0	4	2	-		15	3
2002	Nagoya Grampus Eight	J1 League	29	4	3	0	5	0	-		37	4
2003	Nagoya Grampus Eight	J1 League	22	3	2	0	5	0	-		29	3
2004	Nagoya Grampus Eight	J1 League	29	5	2	1	8	1	-		39	7
2005	Nagoya Grampus Eight	J1 League	34	7	2	1	6	0	-		42	8
2006	Nagoya Grampus Eight	J1 League	33	5	2	0	4	0	-		39	5
2007	Nagoya Grampus Eight	J1 League	26	0	2	0	4	0	-		32	0
2008	Nagoya Grampus	J1 League	31	0	3	0	6	0	-		40	0
2009	Nagoya Grampus	J1 League	30	0	5	1	1	0	9	1	45	2
2010	Nagoya Grampus	J1 League	27	1	3	1	4	0	-		34	2
2011	Nagoya Grampus	J1 League	27	3	2	0	2	0	5	0	36	3
2012	Nagoya Grampus	J1 League	5	0	0	0	0	0	3	0	8	0
2013	Nagoya Grampus	J1 League	20	1	0	0	3	0	-		23	1
2014	Nagoya Grampus	J1 League	18	0	2	0	2	0	-		22	0
Career total			342	30	28	4	54	3	17	1	441	38

== National team statistics ==
Japan national team
Year	Apps	Goals
2006	1	0
Total	1	0

== Honours ==
Nagoya Grampus

- J1 League (1): 2010
- Japanese Super Cup (1): 2011
