= Toru Hasegawa =

Japanese footballer

Toru Hasegawa 長谷川 徹
Personal information
- Full name: Toru Hasegawa
- Date of birth: December 11, 1988 (age 37)
- Place of birth: Seto, Aichi, Japan
- Height: 1.87 m (6 ft 2 in)
- Position: Goalkeeper

Team information
- Current team: Tokushima Vortis
- Number: 31

Youth career
- –2000: Seto SSC
- 2001–2006: Nagoya Grampus Eight

Senior career*
Years	Team	Apps	(Gls)
2007–2011	Nagoya Grampus	1	(0)
2011–	Tokushima Vortis	148	(0)
Medal record
Nagoya Grampus
Winner	J1 League	2010
Runner-up	J1 League	2011
Runner-up	Emperor's Cup	2009
- * Club domestic league appearances and goals as of 14 August 2026

Toru Hasegawa (長谷川 徹, Hasegawa Tōru; born December 11, 1988) is a Japanese footballer who plays for Tokushima Vortis.

== Career statistics ==
Updated to end of 2018 season.

Appearances and goals by club, season and competition
Club	Season	League			Emperor's Cup		J.League Cup		Asia		Total	
Club	Season	Division	Apps	Goals	Apps	Goals	Apps	Goals	Apps	Goals	Apps	Goals
Nagoya Grampus	2007	J1 League	0	0	0	0	2	0	-		2	0
Nagoya Grampus	2008	J1 League	0	0	0	0	0	0	-		0	0
Nagoya Grampus	2009	J1 League	1	0	0	0	0	0	1	0	2	0
Nagoya Grampus	2010	J1 League	0	0	0	0	0	0	-		0	0
Nagoya Grampus	2011	J1 League	0	0	0	0	0	0	-		0	0
Tokushima Vortis	2011	J2 League	0	0	0	0	-		-		0	0
Tokushima Vortis	2012	J2 League	1	0	1	0	-		-		2	0
Tokushima Vortis	2013	J2 League	6	0	0	0	-		-		6	0
Tokushima Vortis	2014	J1 League	27	0	1	0	1	0	-		29	0
Tokushima Vortis	2015	J2 League	37	0	4	0	-		-		41	0
Tokushima Vortis	2016	J2 League	28	0	0	0	-		-		28	0
Tokushima Vortis	2017	J2 League	28	0	0	0	-		-		28	0
Tokushima Vortis	2018	J2 League	0	0	0	0	-		-		0	0
Career total			128	0	6	0	3	0	1	0	138	0
