= Jun Aoyama =

Japanese footballer

Jun Aoyama 青山 隼
Personal information
- Full name: Jun Aoyama
- Date of birth: 3 January 1988 (age 38)
- Place of birth: Sendai, Japan
- Height: 1.82 m (5 ft 11 1/2 in)
- Position: Midfielder

Youth career
- 2003–2005: Nagoya Grampus Eight

Senior career*
Years	Team	Apps	(Gls)
2006–2008	Nagoya Grampus	2	(0)
2008	Cerezo Osaka	14	(0)
2009–2010	Tokushima Vortis	63	(2)
2011	Urawa Reds	1	(0)
2012–2015	Tokushima Vortis	59	(1)
Total		139	(3)

International career
2004	Japan U-17	3	(1)
2005–2007	Japan U-20	10	(1)
Medal record
Urawa Reds
Runner-up	J.League Cup	2011
Representing Japan
AFC U-19 Championship
Silver medal – second place	2006 India
- * Club domestic league appearances and goals

Jun Aoyama (青山 隼, Aoyama Jun; born 3 January 1988) is a former Japanese football player.

== Club career ==
Aoyama was born in Sendai on 3 January 1988. He joined Nagoya Grampus Eight (later Nagoya Grampus) from youth team in 2006. However he could hardly play in the match and he moved to J2 League club Cerezo Osaka in May 2008. He played many matches at Cerezo. He moved to Tokushima Vortis in 2009 and became a regular player. In 2011, he moved to J1 League club Urawa Reds. However he could hardly play in the match and he returned Vortis in 2012. He played many matches and the club was promoted to J1 League end of 2013 season. However his opportunity to play decreased and the club was relegated to J2 League in a season. He retired in July 2015.

== National team career ==
In July 2007, Aoyama was elected Japan U-20 national team for 2007 U-20 World Cup. At this tournament, he played 3 matches as defensive midfielder. He scored a goal for Japan in the 79th minute in Japan's win against Scotland (3–1).
