= Yusuke Sudo =

Japanese footballer

Personal information
- Date of birth: May 7, 1986 (age 40)
- Place of birth: Tokyo, Japan
- Height: 1.83 m (6 ft 0 in)
- Position: Midfielder

Youth career
- 2002–2004: Tokyo Verdy

Senior career*
Years	Team	Apps	(Gls)
2005–2007	Nagoya Grampus Eight	22	(0)
2008–2009	Yokohama FC	38	(0)
2010–2012	Matsumoto Yamaga FC	61	(2)
2013	Salgueiro		
2014	Tombense		
2014	FC Gifu	2	(0)
2015	SC Sagamihara	29	(2)
Total		152	(4)
- * Club domestic league appearances and goals

Yusuke Sudo (須藤 右介, Sudō Yusuke; born May 7, 1986) is a former Japanese football player.

Sudo previously played for Nagoya Grampus Eight and Yokohama FC in the J1 League and J2 League. Then he moved to Brazil and played for two clubs. He will retire at the end of 2015.

== Club statistics ==
Club performance			League		Cup		League Cup		Total	
Season	Club	League	Apps	Goals	Apps	Goals	Apps	Goals	Apps	Goals
Japan			League		Emperor's Cup		J.League Cup		Total	
2005	Nagoya Grampus Eight	J1 League	3	0	0	0	3	0	6	0
2006	Nagoya Grampus Eight	J1 League	15	0	0	0	3	0	18	0
2007	Nagoya Grampus Eight	J1 League	4	0	0	0	6	0	10	0
2008	Yokohama FC	J2 League	9	0	1	0	-		10	0
2009	Yokohama FC	J2 League	29	0	0	0	-		29	0
2010	Matsumoto Yamaga FC	Football League	29	1	1	0	-		30	1
2011	Matsumoto Yamaga FC	Football League	30	1	3	1	-		33	2
2012	Matsumoto Yamaga FC	J2 League	2	0	0	0	-		2	0
2014	FC Gifu	J2 League	2	0	0	0	-		2	0
2015	SC Sagamihara	J3 League	29	2	-		-		29	2
Country	Japan		152	4	5	1	12	0	169	5
Total			152	4	5	1	12	0	169	5
