= Ueslei =

Brazilian footballer

Personal information
- Full name: Ueslei Raimundo Pereira da Silva
- Date of birth: 19 April 1972 (age 54)
- Place of birth: Salvador, Brazil
- Height: 1.77 m (5 ft 9 1/2 in)
- Position: Forward

Senior career*
Years	Team	Apps	(Gls)
1991–1995	Bahia		
1995	Palmeiras		
1996	Guarani		
1996	São Paulo	8	(0)
1997	Vitória		
1998	Internacional	1	(0)
1998–2000	Bahia	?	(25)
2000–2005	Nagoya Grampus Eight	114	(81)
2005	Bahia	15	(5)
2005	→ Atlético Mineiro (loan)	12	(4)
2006–2007	→ Sanfrecce Hiroshima (loan)	56	(33)
2008–2009	→ Oita Trinita (loan)	44	(10)
- * Club domestic league appearances and goals

Ueslei Raimundo Pereira da Silva or better known as Ueslei (born 19 April 1972 in Salvador, Brazil) is a Brazilian former footballer who played as a forward.

Ueslei played for Bahia, Vitória and Atlético Mineiro in the Campeonato Brasileiro.

== Club statistics ==
Club performance			League		Cup		League Cup		Total	
Season	Club	League	Apps	Goals	Apps	Goals	Apps	Goals	Apps	Goals
Japan			League		Emperor's Cup		J.League Cup		Total	
2000	Nagoya Grampus Eight	J1 League	9	7	2	1	4	1	15	9
2001	Nagoya Grampus Eight	J1 League	28	21	1	0	6	3	35	24
2002	Nagoya Grampus Eight	J1 League	27	20	3	3	3	1	33	24
2003	Nagoya Grampus Eight	J1 League	27	22	2	1	5	2	34	25
2004	Nagoya Grampus Eight	J1 League	25	10	1	0	7	7	33	17
2005	Nagoya Grampus Eight	J1 League	1	1	0	0	0	0	1	1
2006	Sanfrecce Hiroshima	J1 League	27	16	1	0	4	0	32	16
2007	Sanfrecce Hiroshima	J1 League	29	17	0	0	5	2	34	19
2008	Oita Trinita	J1 League	30	7	0	0	9	4	39	11
2009	Oita Trinita	J1 League	14	3	0	0	3	1	17	4
Total			217	124	10	5	46	21	273	150

== Honors ==
=== Club ===
Bahia

- Campeonato Baiano: 1991, 1993, 1994, 1998, 1999

São Paulo

- Copa Master de CONMEBOL: 1996

Vitória

- Campeonato Baiano: 1997
- Copa do Nordeste: 1997

Oita Trinita

- J.League Cup: 2008

=== Individual ===
- Brazilian 2nd Division League Top Scorer: 1999
- J.League Top Scorer: 2003
- J.League Best XI: 2003
