= Keiji Watanabe =

Japanese footballer

Keiji Watanabe 渡邊 圭二
Personal information
- Full name: Keiji Watanabe
- Date of birth: January 28, 1985 (age 41)
- Place of birth: Numazu, Japan
- Height: 1.73 m (5 ft 8 in)
- Position: Defender

Youth career
- 2000–2002: Numazu Gakuen High School

Senior career*
Years	Team	Apps	(Gls)
2003–2008	Nagoya Grampus	44	(0)
2009	Japan Soccer College	11	(0)
2010–2013	JEF United Chiba	32	(0)
Total		87	(0)
- * Club domestic league appearances and goals

Keiji Watanabe (渡邊 圭二, Watanabe Keiji; born January 28, 1985) is a former Japanese football player.

== Club statistics ==
Club performance			League		Cup		League Cup		Total	
Season	Club	League	Apps	Goals	Apps	Goals	Apps	Goals	Apps	Goals
Japan			League		Emperor's Cup		J.League Cup		Total	
2003	Nagoya Grampus Eight	J1 League	1	0	0	0	0	0	1	0
2004	Nagoya Grampus Eight	J1 League	5	0	1	0	1	0	7	0
2005	Nagoya Grampus Eight	J1 League	13	0	0	0	2	0	15	0
2006	Nagoya Grampus Eight	J1 League	12	0	1	0	1	0	14	0
2007	Nagoya Grampus Eight	J1 League	13	0	1	0	1	0	15	0
2008	Nagoya Grampus	J1 League	0	0	1	0	1	0	2	0
2009	Japan Soccer College	Regional Leagues	11	0	2	0	-		13	0
2010	JEF United Chiba	J2 League	8	0	0	0	-		8	0
2011	JEF United Chiba	J2 League	15	0	3	0	-		18	0
2012	JEF United Chiba	J2 League	9	0	0	0	-		9	0
2013	JEF United Chiba	J2 League	0	0	0	0	-		0	0
Total			87	0	10	0	6	0	103	0
