= List of Japanese football transfers winter 2010–11 =

This is a list of Japanese football transfers in the winter transfer window 2010–2011 by club.

== J.League Division 1 ==
=== Albirex Niigata ===
In: Note: Flags indicate national team as defined under FIFA eligibility rules; some limited exceptions apply. Players may hold more than one non-FIFA nationality.

No.	Pos.	Nation	Player
—	DF	JPN	Naoya Kikuchi (from Oita Trinita)
—	MF	JPN	Seiya Fujita (from Consadole Sapporo)
—	MF	JPN	Ayato Hasebe (loan return from Zweigen Kanazawa)
—	DF	JPN	Shigeto Matsuda (from Ryutsu Keizai Univ. Kashiwa High School)
—	FW	JPN	Noriyoshi Sakai (from Teikyo Nagaoka High School)
—	GK	JPN	Yasuhiro Watanabe (from Albirex Niigata Youth)
—	DF	JPN	Naoki Ishikawa (from Kashiwa Reysol)

Out: Note: Flags indicate national team as defined under FIFA eligibility rules; some limited exceptions apply. Players may hold more than one non-FIFA nationality.

No.	Pos.	Nation	Player
—	DF	JPN	Daigo Nishi (to Kashima Antlers)
10	MF	BRA	Márcio Richardes (to Urawa Reds)
6	DF	JPN	Mitsuru Nagata (to Urawa Reds)
—	DF	JPN	Naoki Ishikawa (to Consadole Sapporo)
28	MF	JPN	Takahiro Takagi (to Consadole Sapporo)
—	FW	JPN	Kazuhisa Kawahara (loan to Tochigi SC)
—	MF	JPN	Jumpei Takaki (to Consadole Sapporo)
—	MF	JPN	Takashi Okuyama (to Albirex Niigata Singapore FC)
19	MF	JPN	Kazuya Myodo (Released, Free agent)

=== Avispa Fukuoka ===
In: Note: Flags indicate national team as defined under FIFA eligibility rules; some limited exceptions apply. Players may hold more than one non-FIFA nationality.

No.	Pos.	Nation	Player
—	FW	JPN	Kentaro Shigematsu (on loan from FC Tokyo)
—	MF	JPN	Norihisa Shimizu (from Yokohama F. Marinos)
—	DF	JPN	Shogo Kobara (from Ehime FC)
—	MF	JPN	Sho Naruoka (from Júbilo Iwata)
—	DF	JPN	Takumi Wada (from JEF United Ichihara Chiba)
—	FW	JPN	Takuya Matsuura (from Júbilo Iwata)
—	MF	JPN	Taku Noshinohama (from Avispa Fukuoka U-18)
—	MF	JPN	Tokio Hatamoto (from Urawa Reds Youth)

Out: Note: Flags indicate national team as defined under FIFA eligibility rules; some limited exceptions apply. Players may hold more than one non-FIFA nationality.

No.	Pos.	Nation	Player
19	MF	JPN	Genki Nagasato (Ventforet Kofu)
19	FW	JPN	Tetsuya Okubo (Montedio Yamagata)
7	MF	JPN	Kiyokazu Kudo (Retired)
13	DF	JPN	Tomokazu Nagira (to FC Tokyo)
4	MF	JPN	Shu Abe (Released, Free agent)
24	DF	JPN	Kenta Hiraishi (Released, Free agent)
21	FW	JPN	Kyohei Oyama (Released, Free agent)

=== Cerezo Osaka ===
In: Note: Flags indicate national team as defined under FIFA eligibility rules; some limited exceptions apply. Players may hold more than one non-FIFA nationality.

No.	Pos.	Nation	Player
10	FW	KOR	Kim Bo-Kyung (loan return from Oita Trinita)
—	FW	JPN	Kenyu Sugimoto (from Cerezo Osaka U-18)
—	MF	JPN	Kazuya Murada (from Osaka University of Health and Sport Sciences)
—	DF	PRK	Kim Song Gi (from Korea University)

Out: Note: Flags indicate national team as defined under FIFA eligibility rules; some limited exceptions apply. Players may hold more than one non-FIFA nationality.

No.	Pos.	Nation	Player
9	FW	BRA	Adriano Ferreira Martins (to Gamba Osaka)
—	MF	JPN	Akihiro Ienaga (loan return to Gamba Osaka)
2	DF	JPN	Kenji Haneda (to Vissel Kobe)
23	DF	JPN	Tatsuya Yamashita (to Consadole Sapporo)
—	GK	JPN	Daisuke Tada (Released, Free agent)

=== Gamba Osaka ===
In: Note: Flags indicate national team as defined under FIFA eligibility rules; some limited exceptions apply. Players may hold more than one non-FIFA nationality.

No.	Pos.	Nation	Player
—	FW	BRA	Adriano Ferreira Martins (from Cerezo Osaka)
—	MF	KOR	Kim Seung-Yong (from Jeonbuk Hyundai)
—	MF	JPN	Akihiro Ienaga (loan return from Cerezo Osaka)
—	DF	PRK	Kim Jon-Ya (from Komazawa University)
—	DF	JPN	Hiroki Fujiharu (from Osaka University of Health and Sport Sciences)
—	MF	JPN	Kotaro Ohmori (from Gamba Osaka Youth)
—	FW	JPN	Shota Kawanishi (from Osaka University of Health and Sport Sciences)

Out: Note: Flags indicate national team as defined under FIFA eligibility rules; some limited exceptions apply. Players may hold more than one non-FIFA nationality.

No.	Pos.	Nation	Player
—	DF	JPN	Michihiro Yasuda (to Vitesse Arnhem)
—	MF	JPN	Akihiro Ienaga (to RCD Mallorca)
9	MF	BRA	Lucas (Released, Free agent)
—	FW	BRA	Pedro Bispo Moreira Júnior (on loan to FC Tokyo)
—	MF	BRA	Dodo (Released, Free agent)
—	FW	KOR	Cho Jae-Jin (Released, Free agent)
—	DF	JPN	Kodai Yasuda (on loan to Giravanz Kitakyushu)
—	MF	JPN	Shinichi Terada (to Yokohama FC)

=== Júbilo Iwata ===
In: Note: Flags indicate national team as defined under FIFA eligibility rules; some limited exceptions apply. Players may hold more than one non-FIFA nationality.

No.	Pos.	Nation	Player
50	DF	JPN	Masahiro Koga (from Kashiwa Reysol)
15	MF	JPN	Minoru Suganuma (from Kashiwa Reysol)
—	DF	JPN	Yoshiaki Fujita (from Oita Trinita)
—	GK	JPN	Kei Uemura (from Shonan Bellmare)
—	MF	JPN	Hiroki Yamada (from Meiji University)
—	MF	JPN	Yuki Kobayashi (from Meiji University)
—	FW	JPN	Hidetaka Kanazono (from Kansai University)

Out: Note: Flags indicate national team as defined under FIFA eligibility rules; some limited exceptions apply. Players may hold more than one non-FIFA nationality.

No.	Pos.	Nation	Player
—	MF	JPN	Kota Ueda (to Omiya Ardija)
—	FW	JPN	Robert Cullen (to VVV Venlo)
—	MF	JPN	Sho Naruoka (to Avispa Fukuoka)
—	FW	JPN	Yuki Oshitani (to FC Gifu)
24	FW	JPN	Takuya Matsuura (to Avispa Fukuoka)
—	DF	JPN	Kentaro Ohi (to Shonan Bellmare)
17	MF	JPN	Yusuke Inuzuka (to Ventforet Kofu)
21	GK	JPN	Takuya Ohata (Released, Free agent)

=== Kashima Antlers ===
In: Note: Flags indicate national team as defined under FIFA eligibility rules; some limited exceptions apply. Players may hold more than one non-FIFA nationality.

No.	Pos.	Nation	Player
—	MF	JPN	Takuya Honda (from Shimizu S-Pulse)
—	DF	JPN	Daigo Nishi (from Albirex Niigata)
—	MF	JPN	Chikashi Masuda (loan return from Montedio Yamagata)
—	FW	JPN	Yūzō Tashiro (loan return from Montedio Yamagata)
—	FW	BRA	Alex Antônio de Melo Santos (from JEF United Chiba)
—	FW	BRA	Carlos Alexandre Souza Silva (from União de Leiria)
—	MF	JPN	Gaku Shibasaki (from Aomori Yamada High School)
29	GK	JPN	Akihiro Sato (from Hiroshima Sanfrecce)
—	MF	JPN	Takahide Umebachi (from Kansai University High School)
—	MF	JPN	Shoma Doi (from Kashima Antlers Youth)
—	MF	JPN	Gen Shoji (from Yonago Kita High School)

Out: Note: Flags indicate national team as defined under FIFA eligibility rules; some limited exceptions apply. Players may hold more than one non-FIFA nationality.

No.	Pos.	Nation	Player
—	FW	JPN	Ryuta Sasaki (on loan to Shonan Bellmare)
18	FW	BRA	Marquinhos (to Vegalta Sendai)
5	DF	BRA	Gilton (to Porto Alegre)
4	DF	JPN	Go Oiwa (Retired)
27	DF	JPN	Kenta Kasai (Released, Free agent)

=== Kashiwa Reysol ===
In: Note: Flags indicate national team as defined under FIFA eligibility rules; some limited exceptions apply. Players may hold more than one non-FIFA nationality.

No.	Pos.	Nation	Player
—	MF	JPN	Akihiro Hyodo (from Shimizu S-Pulse)
—	MF	BRA	Jorge Wagner (from Esporte Clube Bahia)
—	MF	PRK	Ahn Young-Hak (from Omiya Ardija)

Out: Note: Flags indicate national team as defined under FIFA eligibility rules; some limited exceptions apply. Players may hold more than one non-FIFA nationality.

No.	Pos.	Nation	Player
13	DF	JPN	Yuzo Kobayashi (on loan to Yokohama F. Marinos)
—	DF	JPN	Masahiro Koga (to Júbilo Iwata)
—	MF	JPN	Minoru Suganuma (to Júbilo Iwata)
20	MF	JPN	Ren Sengoku (Hércules Alicante B)
—	MF	JPN	Kosuke Taketomi (to Roasso Kumamoto)
23	DF	JPN	Yohei Kurakawa (Released, Free agent)
2	DF	JPN	Hirofumi Watanabe (on loan to Tochigi SC)

=== Kawasaki Frontale ===
In: Note: Flags indicate national team as defined under FIFA eligibility rules; some limited exceptions apply. Players may hold more than one non-FIFA nationality.

No.	Pos.	Nation	Player
—	FW	JPN	Koji Yamase (from Yokohama F. Marinos)
—	DF	JPN	Yūsuke Tanaka (from Yokohama F. Marinos)
—	MF	JPN	Kosei Shibasaki (from Tokyo Verdy)
—	DF	JPN	Yuki Saneto (from Kochi University)
—	DF	JPN	Yudai Tanaka (from Kansai University)
—	FW	JPN	Koya Tanio (from Yonago Kita High School)
—	FW	JPN	Yuki Natsume (from Komazawa University)
—	DF	JPN	Akito Fukumori (from Toko Gakuen High School)
—	MF	JPN	Ryota Oshima (from Shizuoka Gakuen High School)
—	FW	JPN	Satoshi Kukino (loan return from Yokohama FC)

Out: Note: Flags indicate national team as defined under FIFA eligibility rules; some limited exceptions apply. Players may hold more than one non-FIFA nationality.

No.	Pos.	Nation	Player
29	MF	JPN	Hiroyuki Taniguchi (to Yokohama F. Marinos)
19	DF	JPN	Yusuke Mori (to Tokyo Verdy)
13	DF	JPN	Shuhei Terada (Retired)
—	MF	JPN	Satoru Yamagishi (to Sanfrecce Hiroshima)
3	DF	JPN	Hideki Sahara (Retired)
—	MF	JPN	Yuji Yabu (to Ventforet Kofu)
22	MF	JPN	Yuji Kimura (to Giravanz Kitakyushu)
—	GK	JPN	Yuki Uekasa (to Montedio Yamagata)

=== Montedio Yamagata ===
In: Note: Flags indicate national team as defined under FIFA eligibility rules; some limited exceptions apply. Players may hold more than one non-FIFA nationality.

No.	Pos.	Nation	Player
—	FW	JPN	Tetsuya Okubo (from Avispa Fukuoka)
—	GK	JPN	Yuki Uekusa (from Kawasaki Frontale)

Out: Note: Flags indicate national team as defined under FIFA eligibility rules; some limited exceptions apply. Players may hold more than one non-FIFA nationality.

No.	Pos.	Nation	Player
10	FW	JPN	Yūzō Tashiro (loan return to Kashima Antlers)
8	MF	JPN	Chikashi Masuda (loan return to Kashima Antlers)
18	DF	KOR	Kim Kun-Hoan (loan return to Yokohama F. Marinos)
16	MF	KOR	Kim Byung-Suk (Released, Free agent)
21	FW	KOR	Han Dong-Won (Released, Free agent)
25	MF	JPN	Hisayuki Sato (Released, Free agent)
31	DF	JPN	Yuki Kurihara (Released, Free agent)

=== Nagoya Grampus ===
In: Note: Flags indicate national team as defined under FIFA eligibility rules; some limited exceptions apply. Players may hold more than one non-FIFA nationality.

No.	Pos.	Nation	Player
—	FW	JPN	Kensuke Nagai (from Fukuoka University)
—	MF	JPN	Jungo Fujimoto (from Shimizu S-Pulse)
—	MF	JPN	Makito Yoshida (from Ryutsu Keizai Univ. Kashiwa High School)
—	MF	JPN	Teruki Tanaka (from Mitsubishi Yowa SC Youth)

Out: Note: Flags indicate national team as defined under FIFA eligibility rules; some limited exceptions apply. Players may hold more than one non-FIFA nationality.

No.	Pos.	Nation	Player
8	MF	BRA	Magnum (Released, Free agent)
—	FW	JPN	Tomohiro Tsuda (to Tokushima Vortis)
19	FW	JPN	Keita Sugimoto (to Tokushima Vortis)
17	FW	JPN	Yuki Maki (to Shonan Bellmare)
—	DF	JPN	Masaya Sato (Released, Free agent)

=== Omiya Ardija ===
In: Note: Flags indicate national team as defined under FIFA eligibility rules; some limited exceptions apply. Players may hold more than one non-FIFA nationality.

No.	Pos.	Nation	Player
—	MF	JPN	Kota Ueda (from Júbilo Iwata)
—	DF	KOR	Kim Young Gwon (from FC Tokyo)
—	MF	JPN	Keigo Higashi (from Oita Trinita)
—	DF	JPN	Daigo Watanabe (from Kyoto Sanga FC)
—	MF	JPN	Yosuke Kataoka (from Kyoto Sanga FC)
—	DF	JPN	Shusuke Tsubouchi (from Vissel Kobe)
—	MF	JPN	Taisuke Miyazaki (from Omiya Ardija Youth)
—	FW	JPN	Shintaro Shimizu (from Seibudai High School)

Out: Note: Flags indicate national team as defined under FIFA eligibility rules; some limited exceptions apply. Players may hold more than one non-FIFA nationality.

No.	Pos.	Nation	Player
3	DF	CRO	Mato Neretljak (Suwon Bluewings)
27	FW	JPN	Yoshihito Fujita (to Yokohama FC)
5	MF	PRK	Ahn Young-Hak (Kashiwa Reysol)
18	MF	KOR	Lee Ho (Released, Free agent)
—	MF	JPN	Ryohei Arai (to FC Gifu)
—	MF	JPN	Kohei Tokita (to Oita Trinita)
20	GK	JPN	Daisuke Tada (to Cerezo Osaka)

=== Sanfrecce Hiroshima ===
In: Note: Flags indicate national team as defined under FIFA eligibility rules; some limited exceptions apply. Players may hold more than one non-FIFA nationality.

No.	Pos.	Nation	Player
—	DF	JPN	Hiroki Mizumoto (from Kyoto Sanga FC)
—	DF	JPN	Daiki Nishioka (from Fukuoka University)
—	MF	JPN	Kota Sameshima (from Kagoshima Josei High School)
—	FW	JPN	Sena Inami (from Sanfrecce Hiroshima Youth)

Out: Note: Flags indicate national team as defined under FIFA eligibility rules; some limited exceptions apply. Players may hold more than one non-FIFA nationality.

No.	Pos.	Nation	Player
5	DF	JPN	Tomoaki Makino (to 1. FC Köln)
2	DF	BUL	Ilian Stoyanov (to Fagiano Okayama)
1	GK	JPN	Takashi Shimoda (Retired)
—	GK	JPN	Akihiro Sato (to Kashima Antlers)
20	MF	JPN	Shinichiro Kuwada (to Fagiano Okayama)
—	DF	JPN	Yuya Hashiuchi (to Tokushima Vortis)
30	MF	JPN	Sho Shinohara (Released, Free agent)

=== Shimizu S-Pulse ===
In: Note: Flags indicate national team as defined under FIFA eligibility rules; some limited exceptions apply. Players may hold more than one non-FIFA nationality.

No.	Pos.	Nation	Player
—	MF	JPN	Daigo Kobayashi (from Iraklis)
—	FW	JPN	Naohiro Takahara (from Urawa Reds)
—	DF	JPN	Taisuke Muramatsu (from Shonan Bellmare)
—	MF	JPN	Toshiyuki Takagi (from Tokyo Verdy)
—	FW	JPN	Hiroki Higuchi (from Takigawa HS)
—	DF	JPN	Naoya Okane (from Waseda University)
—	MF	JPN	Akito Tachibana (from Osaka Sangyo University)
—	GK	JPN	Masatoshi Kushibiki (from Aomori Yamada High School)
—	MF	JPN	Makoto Shibahara (from Shimizu S-Pulse Youth)

Out: Note: Flags indicate national team as defined under FIFA eligibility rules; some limited exceptions apply. Players may hold more than one non-FIFA nationality.

No.	Pos.	Nation	Player
16	MF	JPN	Takuya Honda (to Kashima Antlers)
10	MF	JPN	Jungo Fujimoto (to Nagoya Grampus)
11	FW	JPN	Kazuki Hara (to Urawa Reds)
7	MF	JPN	Akihiro Hyodo (to Kashiwa Reysol)
3	DF	JPN	Naoaki Aoyama (to Yokohama F. Marinos)
7	MF	JPN	Teruyoshi Ito (to Ventforet Kofu)
18	FW	NOR	Frode Johnsen (Odd Grenland)
25	DF	JPN	Daisuke Ichikawa (to Ventforet Kofu)
20	FW	JPN	Shun Nagasawa (to Roasso Kumamoto)
21	GK	JPN	Yohei Nishibe (Released, Free agent)
24	MF	JPN	Yuki Nagahata (to Giravanz Kitakyushu)
27	DF	JPN	Tomonobu Hiroi (to Roasso Kumamoto)
—	FW	KOR	Kim Dong-Sub (to Gwangju FC)

=== Urawa Reds ===
In: Note: Flags indicate national team as defined under FIFA eligibility rules; some limited exceptions apply. Players may hold more than one non-FIFA nationality.

No.	Pos.	Nation	Player
—	MF	BRA	Márcio Richardes (from Albirex Niigata)
—	FW	JPN	Kazuki Hara (from Shimizu S-Pulse)
—	DF	JPN	Mitsuru Nagata (from Albirex Niigata)
—	MF	JPN	Jun Aoyama (from Tokushima Vortis)
—	MF	JPN	Shuto Kojima (from Maebashi Ikuei High School)
—	DF	JPN	Takuya Okamoto (from Urawa Reds Youth)
—	DF	JPN	Shunsuke Tsutsumi (loan return from Roasso Kumamoto)
—	DF	JPN	Koji Noda (loan return from Fagiano Okayama)

Out: Note: Flags indicate national team as defined under FIFA eligibility rules; some limited exceptions apply. Players may hold more than one non-FIFA nationality.

No.	Pos.	Nation	Player
—	MF	JPN	Hajime Hosogai (to FC Augsburg via Bayer Leverkusen)
—	MF	BRA	Robson Ponte (Released, Free agent)
—	FW	JPN	Naohiro Takahara (to Shimizu S-Pulse)
—	MF	BFA	Wilfried Sanou (loan return to F.C. Koln)
—	DF	JPN	Masahito Hashimoto (Released, Free agent)
—	MF	JPN	Yusuke Hayashi (to Thespa Kusatsu)
—	DF	JPN	Takuya Nagata (loan to Thespa Kusatsu)
—	MF	JPN	Yoshiya Nishizawa (to Tochigi SC)

=== Vegalta Sendai ===
In: Note: Flags indicate national team as defined under FIFA eligibility rules; some limited exceptions apply. Players may hold more than one non-FIFA nationality.

No.	Pos.	Nation	Player
—	FW	BRA	Marquinhos (from Kashima Antlers)
—	MF	JPN	Toshihiro Matsushita (from FC Tokyo)
—	FW	JPN	Shingo Akamine (from FC Tokyo)
—	FW	JPN	Atsushi Yanagisawa (from Kyoto Purple Sanga)
—	DF	JPN	Makoto Kakuda (from Kyoto Purple Sanga)
—	DF	JPN	Keisuke Harada (from Tsukuba University)
—	FW	JPN	Yuki Mutoh (from Ryutsu Keizai University)
—	GK	JPN	Kei Ishikawa (from Niigata Meikun High School)
—	FW	JPN	Goshi Okubo (loan return from Sony Sendai FC)

Out: Note: Flags indicate national team as defined under FIFA eligibility rules; some limited exceptions apply. Players may hold more than one non-FIFA nationality.

No.	Pos.	Nation	Player
—	FW	KOR	Park Sung-Ho (to Daejeon Citizen F.C.)
—	DF	JPN	Yugo Ichiyanagi (Fagiano Okayama)
—	GK	JPN	Tatsuo Hagihara (to Ehime FC)
—	MF	JPN	Naoki Chiba (Retired)
—	FW	JPN	Tomoyuki Hirase (Retired)
—	MF	JPN	Junichi Misawa (Released, Free agent)
—	MF	JPN	Atsushi Nagai (Released, Free agent)

=== Ventforet Kofu ===
In: Note: Flags indicate national team as defined under FIFA eligibility rules; some limited exceptions apply. Players may hold more than one non-FIFA nationality.

No.	Pos.	Nation	Player
—	MF	JPN	Yoshiro Abe (from Shonan Bellmare)
—	DF	JPN	Daisuke Ichikawa (from Shimizu S-Pulse)
—	MF	JPN	Teruyoshi Ito (from Shimizu S-Pulse)
—	MF	BRA	Rudnei (from Avaí Futebol Clube)
—	MF	JPN	Yusuke Inuzuka (from Júbilo Iwata)
—	MF	JPN	Yuji Yabu (from Kawasaki Frontale)
—	DF	JPN	Teruaki Kobayashi (from Vissel Kobe)
—	GK	JPN	Hiroki Oka (from Komazawa University)

Out: Note: Flags indicate national team as defined under FIFA eligibility rules; some limited exceptions apply. Players may hold more than one non-FIFA nationality.

No.	Pos.	Nation	Player
—	DF	JPN	Masaki Yanagawa (to Vissel Kobe)
24	MF	JPN	Takahiro Kuniyoshi (to Sagan Tosu)
—	FW	JPN	Yohei Onishi (Released, Free agent)
—	MF	JPN	Ken Fujita (Released, Free agent)
—	DF	JPN	Yosuke Ikehata (Released, Free agent)
—	GK	JPN	Shinya Kato (Released, Free agent)
—	DF	JPN	Yuki Touma (Released, Free agent)
—	MF	JPN	Hiromu Karasawa (Released, Free agent)

=== Vissel Kobe ===
In: Note: Flags indicate national team as defined under FIFA eligibility rules; some limited exceptions apply. Players may hold more than one non-FIFA nationality.

No.	Pos.	Nation	Player
—	DF	JPN	Kenji Haneda (from Cerezo Osaka)
—	FW	JPN	Keijiro Ogawa (from Vissel Kobe U-18)
—	MF	BRA	Rogério Miranda Silva (from Al Wasl)
—	DF	JPN	Masaki Yanagawa (loan return from Ventforet Kofu)
—	MF	JPN	Kenji Baba (loan return from Shonan Bellmare)
—	DF	JPN	Keisuke Hayashi (from Doshisha University)

Out: Note: Flags indicate national team as defined under FIFA eligibility rules; some limited exceptions apply. Players may hold more than one non-FIFA nationality.

No.	Pos.	Nation	Player
—	DF	JPN	Shusuke Tsubouchi (to Omiya Ardija)
—	GK	JPN	Tatsuya Enomoto (Released, Free agent)
2	DF	JPN	Teruaki Kobayashi (to Ventforet Kofu)
—	FW	JPN	Kazuki Ganaha (to FC Ryukyu)
—	DF	JPN	Daisuke Tomita (Released, Free agent)
—	MF	BRA	Edmilson Alves (Released, Free agent)

=== Yokohama F. Marinos ===
In: Note: Flags indicate national team as defined under FIFA eligibility rules; some limited exceptions apply. Players may hold more than one non-FIFA nationality.

No.	Pos.	Nation	Player
—	FW	JPN	Masashi Oguro (from Yokohama FC)
—	DF	JPN	Naoaki Aoyama (from Shimizu S-Pulse)
—	DF	JPN	Yuzo Kobayashi (from Kashiwa Reysol)
—	MF	JPN	Hiroyuki Taniguchi (from Kawasaki Frontale)
—	FW	JPN	Yuji Ono (from Yokohama F. Marinos Youth)
—	DF	KOR	Kim Kun-Hoan (loan return from Montedio Yamagata)
—	DF	JPN	Eijiro Takeda (from Aoyama Gakuin University)
—	MF	JPN	Kentaro Moriya (from Tsukuba University)
—	MF	JPN	Sho Matsumoto (from Yokohama F. Marinos Youth)

Out: Note: Flags indicate national team as defined under FIFA eligibility rules; some limited exceptions apply. Players may hold more than one non-FIFA nationality.

No.	Pos.	Nation	Player
—	MF	JPN	Ryuji Kawai (to Consadole Sapporo)
—	DF	JPN	Yūsuke Tanaka (to Kawasaki Frontale)
—	MF	JPN	Koji Yamase (to Kawasaki Frontale)
—	DF	JPN	Naoki Matsuda (to Matsumoto Yamaga FC)
—	DF	JPN	Masato Fujita (to Yokohama FC)
—	FW	JPN	Daisuke Sakata (to Aris Thessaloniki)
—	MF	JPN	Norihisa Shimizu (to Avispa Fukuoka)
—	DF	JPN	Nobuhisa Urata (to Sagan Tosu)
—	FW	JPN	Yosuke Saito (to Albirex Niigata Singapore)
—	DF	JPN	Daiki Umei (Released, Free agent)
—	FW	JPN	Manabu Saitō (to Ehime FC)
—	DF	KOR	Jeong Dong-Ho (to Gainare Tottori)

== J.League Division 2 ==
=== Consadole Sapporo ===
In: Note: Flags indicate national team as defined under FIFA eligibility rules; some limited exceptions apply. Players may hold more than one non-FIFA nationality.

No.	Pos.	Nation	Player
—	DF	JPN	Ryuji Kawai (from Yokohama F. Marinos)
—	MF	JPN	Jumpei Takaki (from Shimizu S-Pulse)
—	MF	BRA	Bruno Ferraz das Neves (from Cruzeiro)
—	DF	BRA	Tiago Prado (from EC Pelota)
—	GK	KOR	Lee Ho-seung (from Dongguk University)
—	DF	JPN	Takuma Hidaka (from Sagan Tosu)
—	DF	JPN	Tatsuya Yamashita (from Cerezo Osaka)
—	DF	JPN	Naoki Ishikawa (from Albirex Niigata)
—	GK	JPN	Takahiro Takagi (from Albirex Niigata)
—	FW	JPN	Yosuke Mikami (from Consadole Sapporo U-18)
—	DF	JPN	Kazuki Kushibiki (from Muroran Otani High School)

Out: Note: Flags indicate national team as defined under FIFA eligibility rules; some limited exceptions apply. Players may hold more than one non-FIFA nationality.

No.	Pos.	Nation	Player
—	MF	JPN	Kazumasa Uesato (on loan to FC Tokyo)
—	MF	JPN	Seiya Fujita (to Albirex Niigata)
—	DF	JPN	Hiroyuki Nishizama (to Tokushima Vortis)
—	DF	JPN	Shuhei Hotta (Released, Free agent)
—	MF	PRK	Lee Han-Jae (Released, Free agent)
—	MF	JPN	Makoto Sunakawa (Released, Free agent)
—	DF	JPN	Yoshinobu Minowa (Released, Free agent)
—	DF	JPN	Ryuji Fujiyama (Released, Free agent)
—	DF	JPN	Mitsuyuki Yoshihiro (Released, Free agent)

=== Ehime FC ===
In: Note: Flags indicate national team as defined under FIFA eligibility rules; some limited exceptions apply. Players may hold more than one non-FIFA nationality.

No.	Pos.	Nation	Player
—	GK	JPN	Tatsuo Hagihara (from Vegalta Sendai)
—	DF	JPN	Yoshihiro Mitsuyuki (from Consadole Sapporo)
—	DF	JPN	Maeno Takenori (from Ritsumeikan University)
—	FW	JPN	Yusei Ogasawara (from Kyoto Sangyo University)

Out: Note: Flags indicate national team as defined under FIFA eligibility rules; some limited exceptions apply. Players may hold more than one non-FIFA nationality.

No.	Pos.	Nation	Player
—	DF	JPN	Shogo Kobara (to Avispa Fukuoka)
—	MF	JPN	Shinsaku Mochidome (Released, Free agent)
—	GK	JPN	Tatsuya Tsuruta (Released, Free agent)
—	MF	JPN	Shohei Matsunaga (Released, Free agent)
—	GK	JPN	Hiromosa Yamamoto (Released, Free agent)
—	MF	JPN	Kenichi Ego (Released, Free agent)
—	DF	JPN	Kohei Matsushita (Released, Free agent)

=== Fagiano Okayama ===
In: Note: Flags indicate national team as defined under FIFA eligibility rules; some limited exceptions apply. Players may hold more than one non-FIFA nationality.

No.	Pos.	Nation	Player
—	GK	JPN	Daisuke Nakamaki (from JEF Chiba)
—	DF	JPN	Yugo Ichiyanagi (from Vegalta Sendai)
—	FW	JPN	Shingo Kukita (from Tokyo University)
—	FW	JPN	Kosuke Kadoshima (from Doshisha University)
—	GK	JPN	Shuhei Matsubara (from Consadole Sapporo U-18)
—	MF	JPN	Takayoshi Ishihara (from Shimizu S-Pulse Youth)
—	DF	BUL	Ilian Stoyanov (from Sanfrecce Hiroshima)

Out: Note: Flags indicate national team as defined under FIFA eligibility rules; some limited exceptions apply. Players may hold more than one non-FIFA nationality.

No.	Pos.	Nation	Player
11	FW	JPN	Kohei Kiyama (Tokyo Verdy)
10	MF	JPN	Shugo Kawahara (retired)
8	MF	KOR	Kim Tae-yeon (Tokyo Verdy)
18	FW	JPN	Tadashi Takeda (to Matsumoto Yamaga FC)
—	MF	JPN	Yuhei Ono (to Fukushima United)
—	FW	JPN	Dei Shotaro (Released, Free agent)
—	MF	JPN	Yuichi Morimoto (Released, Free agent)
—	GK	JPN	Taki Hironori (Released, Free agent)
—	MF	JPN	Takuro Yoshioka (Released, Free agent)
—	DF	JPN	Masahiko Kimura (Released, Free agent)

=== FC Gifu ===
In: Note: Flags indicate national team as defined under FIFA eligibility rules; some limited exceptions apply. Players may hold more than one non-FIFA nationality.

No.	Pos.	Nation	Player
—	MF	JPN	Ryohei Arai (from Omiya Ardija)
—	FW	JPN	Yuki Oshitani (from Júbilo Iwata)
—	DF	JPN	Akihiro Noda (from Waseda University)

Out: Note: Flags indicate national team as defined under FIFA eligibility rules; some limited exceptions apply. Players may hold more than one non-FIFA nationality.

No.	Pos.	Nation	Player
—	FW	KOR	Park Gi-Dong (Released, Free agent)
—	FW	KOR	Park Joon-Kyung (Released, Free agent)

=== FC Tokyo ===
In: Note: Flags indicate national team as defined under FIFA eligibility rules; some limited exceptions apply. Players may hold more than one non-FIFA nationality.

No.	Pos.	Nation	Player
—	FW	JPN	Daiki Takamatsu (on loan from Oita Trinita)
—	MF	JPN	Kazumasa Uesato (on loan from Consadole Sapporo)
—	MF	JPN	Tatsuya Yazawa (from JEF United Chiba)
—	FW	BRA	Pedro Bispo Moreira Júnior (on loan from Gamba Osaka)
—	DF	JPN	Tomokazu Nagira (from Avispa Fukuoka)
—	MF	BRA	Roberto Júlio de Figueiredo (from Yokohama FC)
—	FW	BRA	Roberto César Zardim Rodrigues (from Avaí Futebol Clube)

Out: Note: Flags indicate national team as defined under FIFA eligibility rules; some limited exceptions apply. Players may hold more than one non-FIFA nationality.

No.	Pos.	Nation	Player
—	FW	JPN	Kentaro Shigematsu (loan to Avispa Fukuoka)
—	MF	JPN	Shingo Akamine (Vegalta Sendai)
—	MF	JPN	Toshihiro Matsushita (loan to Vegalta Sendai)
32	FW	JPN	Shunsuke Maeda (released, free agent)
—	GK	JPN	Nobuyuki Abe (to Shonan Bellmare)

=== Gainare Tottori ===
In: Note: Flags indicate national team as defined under FIFA eligibility rules; some limited exceptions apply. Players may hold more than one non-FIFA nationality.

No.	Pos.	Nation	Player
—	MF	JPN	Ryo Nishio (from Gainare Tottori Youth)

Out: Note: Flags indicate national team as defined under FIFA eligibility rules; some limited exceptions apply. Players may hold more than one non-FIFA nationality.

No.	Pos.	Nation	Player
—	DF	JPN	Naoya Shibamura (Released, Free agent)
—	DF	JPN	Yuki Nakayama (Released, Free agent)
—	MF	JPN	Akira Akao (Released, Free agent)
—	GK	JPN	Genki Ota (Released, Free agent)
—	MF	JPN	Kenji Suzuki (Released, Free agent)
—	FW	JPN	Keigo Kamada (Released, Free agent)
—	FW	JPN	Ryuki Kozawa (Released, Free agent)

=== Giravanz Kitakyushu ===
In: Note: Flags indicate national team as defined under FIFA eligibility rules; some limited exceptions apply. Players may hold more than one non-FIFA nationality.

No.	Pos.	Nation	Player
—	DF	JPN	Kodai Yasuda (from Gamba Osaka)
—	DF	JPN	Ryu Hukui (from Tokyo Verdy)
—	MF	JPN	Yuta Hashimura (from Yokohama FC)
—	MF	JPN	Yuji Kimura (from Kawasaki Frontale)
—	MF	JPN	Takayuki Tada (from National Institute of Fitness and Sports in Kanoya)
—	MF	JPN	Yuki Nagahata (from Shimizu S-Pulse)

Out: Note: Flags indicate national team as defined under FIFA eligibility rules; some limited exceptions apply. Players may hold more than one non-FIFA nationality.

No.	Pos.	Nation	Player
—	DF	JPN	Takuya Ito (Released, Free agent)
—	MF	JPN	Jun Muramatsu (Released, Free agent)
—	FW	JPN	Taro Hasegawa (Released, Free agent)
—	DF	JPN	Hiromichi Katano (Released, Free agent)
—	GK	JPN	Yuya Funatsu (Released, Free agent)
—	FW	JPN	Yudai Nakashima (Released, Free agent)
—	DF	BRA	Tatico (Released, Free agent)
—	MF	BRA	Wellington (Released, Free agent)
—	MF	JPN	Tomoki Hidaka (Released, Free agent)

=== JEF Chiba ===
In: Note: Flags indicate national team as defined under FIFA eligibility rules; some limited exceptions apply. Players may hold more than one non-FIFA nationality.

No.	Pos.	Nation	Player
—	FW	NOR	Tor Hogne Aarøy (from Aalesunds FK)
—	MF	JPN	Tsukasa Masuyama (loan return from Oita Trinita)
—	DF	JPN	Shoji Hashimoto (from Kanto University)
—	GK	JPN	Takuo Okubo (from Yokohama FC)
—	FW	JPN	Yuichi Kuba (from Meiji University)

Out: Note: Flags indicate national team as defined under FIFA eligibility rules; some limited exceptions apply. Players may hold more than one non-FIFA nationality.

No.	Pos.	Nation	Player
3	MF	BRA	Alex Antônio de Melo Santos (to Kashima Antlers)
—	MF	JPN	Tatsuya Yazawa (to FC Tokyo)
20	FW	BRA	Neto Baiano (Released, Free agent)
—	DF	JPN	Takumi Wada (Avispa Fukuoka)
—	FW	JPN	Ryo Kanazawa (Released, Free agent)
—	GK	JPN	Daisuke Nakamaki (to Fagiano Okayama)
—	DF	JPN	Shohei Ikeda (Released, Free agent)
—	DF	JPN	Takumi Wada (to Avispa Fukuoka)
—	DF	JPN	Shoma Kamata (to Shonan Bellmare)

=== Kataller Toyama ===
In: Note: Flags indicate national team as defined under FIFA eligibility rules; some limited exceptions apply. Players may hold more than one non-FIFA nationality.

No.	Pos.	Nation	Player
—	DF	BUL	Ilian Stoyanov (from Hiroshima Sanfrecce)
—	GK	JPN	Ken Iida (from Tochigi SC)

Out: Note: Flags indicate national team as defined under FIFA eligibility rules; some limited exceptions apply. Players may hold more than one non-FIFA nationality.

No.	Pos.	Nation	Player
—	GK	JPN	Yuji Nakagawa (Retired)
—	MF	JPN	Kazuya Nagayama (Retired)
—	DF	JPN	Yuki Hamano (Retired)
—	MF	JPN	Makoto Watanabe (Retired)
—	MF	JPN	Kazuaki Kamizono (Retired)
—	FW	JPN	Mitsuru Hasegawa (Retired)
—	MF	JPN	Ryo Nojima (Retired)
—	DF	JPN	Yohei Nakada (Retired)
—	DF	PRK	Kim Myung-Hwi (Released, Free agent)
—	MF	JPN	Kentaro Kawasaki (Released, Free agent)
—	MF	PRK	Kang Hyon-Su (Released, Free agent)
—	FW	JPN	Masato Sakurai (Released, Free agent)
—	GK	JPN	Satoshi Hashida (Released, Free agent)

=== Kyoto Sanga FC ===
In: Note: Flags indicate national team as defined under FIFA eligibility rules; some limited exceptions apply. Players may hold more than one non-FIFA nationality.

No.	Pos.	Nation	Player
—	DF	JPN	Ryusuke Sakai (from Komazawa University)
—	DF	JPN	Shogo Shimohata (from Kyoto Sanga FC U-18)
—	DF	JPN	Noritaka Akimoto (from Ventforet Kofu)
—	MF	JPN	Toshitake Yamada (from Kyoto Sanga FC U-18)
—	MF	JPN	Yoshinari Komai (from Kyoto Sanga FC U-18)
—	MF	JPN	Yuta Ito (from Kyoto Sanga FC U-18)
—	MF	JPN	Yosuke Naito (from Ritsumeikan University)
—	MF	JPN	Kohei Kudo (from JEF United Ichihara Chiba)
—	MF	KOR	Jung Woo-Young (from Kyon-Hee University)

Out: Note: Flags indicate national team as defined under FIFA eligibility rules; some limited exceptions apply. Players may hold more than one non-FIFA nationality.

No.	Pos.	Nation	Player
—	DF	JPN	Hiroki Mizumoto (to Sanfrecce Hiroshima)
—	DF	JPN	Makoto Kakuda (to Vegalta Sendai)
—	DF	JPN	Yasumasa Nishino (Released, Free agent)
—	DF	JPN	Yusuke Nakatani (Released, Free agent)
—	DF	JPN	Hiroki Mizumoto (to Sanfrecce Hiroshima)
—	DF	JPN	Tatsuya Masushima (to Kashiwa Reysol)
—	DF	JPN	Daigo Watanabe (to Omiya Ardija)
—	MF	JPN	Yosuke Kataoka (to Omiya Ardija)
—	FW	JPN	Atsushi Yanagisawa (to Vegalta Sendai)

=== Mito HollyHock ===
In: Note: Flags indicate national team as defined under FIFA eligibility rules; some limited exceptions apply. Players may hold more than one non-FIFA nationality.

No.	Pos.	Nation	Player
—	GK	JPN	Takashi Kasahara (from Meiji University)
—	DF	JPN	Tsukasa Enya (from Tokushima Kokushikan)
—	FW	JPN	Susumu Kamimura (from Senshu University)
—	MF	JPN	Makoto Obata (from Senshu University)
—	DF	JPN	Yuki Okada (from Tochigi SC)

Out: Note: Flags indicate national team as defined under FIFA eligibility rules; some limited exceptions apply. Players may hold more than one non-FIFA nationality.

No.	Pos.	Nation	Player
—	DF	JPN	Yuji Sakuda (to Oita Trinita)
—	DF	JPN	Yuji Fujikawa (to Oita Trinita)
—	MF	JPN	Masahiro Ohashi (Released, Free agent)
—	DF	JPN	Keisuke Hoshino (Released, Free agent)
—	MF	JPN	Kenichi Mori (Released, Free agent)
—	FW	JPN	Satoshi Nakayama (Released, Free agent)
—	GK	JPN	Yoshinobu Harada (Released, Free agent)
—	FW	JPN	Masato Katayama (Released, Free agent)
—	MF	JPN	Kohei Shimodo (to FC Tokyo)
—	DF	JPN	Hideyuki Nakamura (to Thespa Kusatsu)
—	DF	JPN	Masashi Owada (to Tochigi SC)

=== Oita Trinita ===
In: Note: Flags indicate national team as defined under FIFA eligibility rules; some limited exceptions apply. Players may hold more than one non-FIFA nationality.

No.	Pos.	Nation	Player
23	MF	JPN	Hironori Nishi (from Roasso Kumamoto)
6	MF	JPN	Kohei Tokita (from Omiya Ardija)
—	DF	JPN	Yuji Sakuda (from Mito HollyHock)
—	DF	JPN	Ken Matsubara (from Oita Trinita U-18)
—	DF	JPN	Yu Yasukawa (from Doshisha University)

Out: Note: Flags indicate national team as defined under FIFA eligibility rules; some limited exceptions apply. Players may hold more than one non-FIFA nationality.

No.	Pos.	Nation	Player
—	FW	JPN	Daiki Takamatsu (on loan to FC Tokyo)
8	MF	JPN	Keigo Higashi (to Omiya Ardija)
36	DF	JPN	Naoya Kikuchi (to Albirex Niigata)
10	DF	KOR	Kim Bo-kyung (to Cerezo Osaka)
33	DF	JPN	Yoshiaki Fujita (to Júbilo Iwata)
—	MF	JPN	Tsukasa Maruyama (to JEF United Ichihara Chiba)
3	DF	KOR	Jang Kyung-Jin (to Incheon United F.C.)
25	DF	JPN	Hiroyuki Kobayashi (to Blaublitz Akita)
2	DF	JPN	Yusuke Murayama (Retired)
1	GK	JPN	Seigo Shimokawa (Released, Free agent)
—	DF	JPN	Yusuke Fujikawa (to Mito HollyHock)

=== Roasso Kumamoto ===
In: Note: Flags indicate national team as defined under FIFA eligibility rules; some limited exceptions apply. Players may hold more than one non-FIFA nationality.

No.	Pos.	Nation	Player
—	FW	JPN	Shun Nagasawa (from Shimizu S-Pulse)
—	DF	JPN	Tomonobu Hiroi (from Shimizu S-Pulse)
—	MF	JPN	Akira Katayama (from FC Gifu 2)
—	MF	JPN	Toshikazu Tanaka (from Sayama Osaka Kyoiku University)
—	MF	JPN	Kosuke Taketomi (from Kashiwa Reysol Youth)
—	FW	JPN	Kazuki Saito (from Chukyo University)
—	DF	JPN	Fumiya Iwamaru (from Yokohama FC)

Out: Note: Flags indicate national team as defined under FIFA eligibility rules; some limited exceptions apply. Players may hold more than one non-FIFA nationality.

No.	Pos.	Nation	Player
23	MF	JPN	Hironori Nishi (Oita Trinita)
—	MF	JPN	Toshiya Fujita (Released, Free agent)
—	DF	JPN	Kunihiro Yamashita (Released, Free agent)
—	MF	JPN	Yasunobu Matsuoka (Released, Free agent)
—	FW	JPN	Shotaro Ihata (Released, Free agent)
—	MF	JPN	Takumi Watanabe (Released, Free agent)
—	FW	JPN	Takuya Sasaki (Released, Free agent)
—	FW	JPN	Robert Cullen (Released, Free agent)
—	MF	JPN	Yoshiki Hiraki (to Shonan Bellmare)
—	DF	JPN	Shunsuke Tsutsumi (to Urawa Reds)

=== Sagan Tosu ===
In: Note: Flags indicate national team as defined under FIFA eligibility rules; some limited exceptions apply. Players may hold more than one non-FIFA nationality.

No.	Pos.	Nation	Player
—	MF	JPN	Takahiro Kuniyoshi (from Ventforet Kofu)
—	FW	JPN	Ryunosuke Noda (from Japan University of Economics)
—	DF	JPN	Sou Morita (from Sagan Tosu U-18)

Out: Note: Flags indicate national team as defined under FIFA eligibility rules; some limited exceptions apply. Players may hold more than one non-FIFA nationality.

No.	Pos.	Nation	Player
—	DF	JPN	Takuma Hidaka (to Consadole Sapporo)
—	MF	JPN	Yosuke Nozaki (to Yokohama FC)
—	DF	JPN	Hiroshi Ichihara (Released, Free agent)
—	GK	JPN	Tsohimitsu Asai (Released, Free agent)
—	MF	KOR	Park Jon-Su (Released, Free agent)
—	GK	JPN	Shinichi Shuto (Released, Free agent)
—	MF	JPN	Hirokazu Hasegawa (Released, Free agent)
—	MF	KOR	Kim Ho-Nam (to Gwangju Sangmu FC)

=== Shonan Bellmare ===
In: Note: Flags indicate national team as defined under FIFA eligibility rules; some limited exceptions apply. Players may hold more than one non-FIFA nationality.

No.	Pos.	Nation	Player
—	FW	JPN	Ryuta Sasaki (on loan from Kashima Antlers)
—	FW	JPN	Yuki Maki (from Nagoya Grampus)
—	DF	JPN	Kentaro Ohi (from Júbilo Iwata)
—	DF	KOR	Song Han-Ki (from Woo-Suk University)
—	FW	BRA	Lucas (from Sport Club Internacional)
—	MF	JPN	Naoya Ishigami (from Cerezo Osaka)
—	MF	JPN	Ryota Nagaki (from Chuo University)
—	MF	JPN	Ken Iwao (from Nippon Sport Science University)
—	DF	JPN	Wataru Endo (from Shonan Bellmare Youth)
—	GK	JPN	Takuya Matsumoto (from Juntendo University)
—	FW	JPN	Kaoru Takayama (from Senshu University)
—	MF	JPN	Daisuke Kikuchi (from Thespa Kusatsu)
—	GK	JPN	Nobuyuki Abe (from FC Tokyo)
—	DF	JPN	Shoma Kamata (from JEF Chiba)
—	MF	JPN	Yoshiki Hiraki (from Roasso Kumamoto)

Out: Note: Flags indicate national team as defined under FIFA eligibility rules; some limited exceptions apply. Players may hold more than one non-FIFA nationality.

No.	Pos.	Nation	Player
—	DF	JPN	Taisuke Muramatsu (to Shimizu S-Pulse)
—	DF	JPN	Yoshiro Abe (to Ventforet Kofu)
27	DF	JPN	Shota Kobayashi (to Thespa Kusatsu)
—	MF	JPN	Kenji Baba (to Vissel Kobe)
16	GK	JPN	Kei Uemura (Júbilo Iwata)
—	DF	BRA	Jean (Released, Free agent)
—	DF	JPN	Yuzo Tamura (Retired)
—	MF	JPN	Yoshito Terakawa (Released, Free agent)
—	DF	JPN	Nobutaka Suzuki (Released, Free agent)
—	DF	JPN	Akihiro Sakata (Released, Free agent)
—	FW	JPN	Tatsunori Arai (Released, Free agent)
—	MF	JPN	Ryota Nagata (Released, Free agent)
—	FW	JPN	Tatsuki Kobayashi (Released, Free agent)
—	FW	JPN	Genki Nakayama (Released, Free agent)

=== Thespa Kusatsu ===
In: Note: Flags indicate national team as defined under FIFA eligibility rules; some limited exceptions apply. Players may hold more than one non-FIFA nationality.

No.	Pos.	Nation	Player
—	DF	JPN	Shota Kobayashi (from Shonan Bellmare)
—	DF	JPN	Hideyuki Nakamura (from Mito HollyHock)
—	MF	JPN	Yusuke Hayashi (from Urawa Reds)
—	DF	JPN	Takuya Nagata (from Urawa Reds)
—	DF	JPN	Satoru Hoshino (from Chukyo University)

Out: Note: Flags indicate national team as defined under FIFA eligibility rules; some limited exceptions apply. Players may hold more than one non-FIFA nationality.

No.	Pos.	Nation	Player
—	DF	JPN	Kei Omoto (Released, Free agent)
—	FW	JPN	Yasunori Takada (Released, Free agent)
—	MF	JPN	Nozomi Hiroyama (Released, Free agent)
—	FW	JPN	Ryoji Ujihara (Released, Free agent)
—	MF	JPN	Nobuhide Akiba (Released, Free agent)
—	DF	JPN	Shingo Shibata (Released, Free agent)
—	DF	KOR	Choi Sung-Yong (Released, Free agent)
—	GK	JPN	Satoshi Tokizawa (Released, Free agent)
—	DF	BRA	Daniel (Released, Free agent)
—	DF	JPN	Masaya Sato (to Nagoya Grampus)
—	MF	JPN	Daisuke Kikuchi (to Shonan Bellmare)
—	DF	JPN	Daiki Umei (to Yokohama F. Marinos)

=== Tochigi SC ===
In: Note: Flags indicate national team as defined under FIFA eligibility rules; some limited exceptions apply. Players may hold more than one non-FIFA nationality.

No.	Pos.	Nation	Player
—	FW	ARG	Mariano Trípodi (from Arsenal de Sarandí)
—	DF	JPN	Masashi Owada (from Mito HollyHock)
—	DF	JPN	Hirofumi Watanabe (from Kashiwa Reysol)

Out: Note: Flags indicate national team as defined under FIFA eligibility rules; some limited exceptions apply. Players may hold more than one non-FIFA nationality.

No.	Pos.	Nation	Player
—	GK	JPN	Ken Iida (to Kataller Toyama)
—	MF	JPN	Yusuke Sato (Retired)
—	MF	JPN	Yuki Okada (Released, Free agent)
—	DF	JPN	Toru Miyamoto (Released, Free agent)
—	FW	JPN	Hiroyuki Hayashi (Released, Free agent)
—	GK	JPN	Tatsumi Iida (Released, Free agent)
—	DF	JPN	Atsushi Yoneyama (Released, Free agent)
—	DF	JPN	Masahito Hashimoto (Released, Free agent)
—	MF	KOR	Yeo Hyo-Jin (to F.C. Seoul)

=== Tokushima Vortis ===
In: Note: Flags indicate national team as defined under FIFA eligibility rules; some limited exceptions apply. Players may hold more than one non-FIFA nationality.

No.	Pos.	Nation	Player
11	FW	JPN	Tomohiro Tsuda (from Nagoya Grampus)
—	FW	JPN	Keita Sugimoto (from Nagoya Grampus)
6	DF	JPN	Hiroyuki Nishizawa (from Consadole Sapporo)

Out: Note: Flags indicate national team as defined under FIFA eligibility rules; some limited exceptions apply. Players may hold more than one non-FIFA nationality.

No.	Pos.	Nation	Player
—	FW	JPN	Koji Onishi (Retired)
—	DF	JPN	Hikaru Mita (Released, Free agent)
—	MF	JPN	Kenichiro Meta (Released, Free agent)
—	MF	JPN	Yuya Hikichi (Released, Free agent)
—	MF	JPN	Kazuyuki Mugita (Released, Free agent)
—	DF	JPN	Kosuke Yatsuda (Released, Free agent)
—	GK	JPN	Suguru Hino (Released, Free agent)
—	MF	JPN	Wataru Inoue (Released, Free agent)
—	FW	JPN	Kota Sugawara (Released, Free agent)
—	FW	KOR	Kim Dong-Sub (to Gwangju Sangmu FC)

=== Tokyo Verdy ===
In: Note: Flags indicate national team as defined under FIFA eligibility rules; some limited exceptions apply. Players may hold more than one non-FIFA nationality.

No.	Pos.	Nation	Player
—	DF	JPN	Kota Fukatsu (from F.C. Machida Zelvia)
—	DF	JPN	Yusuke Mori (from Kawasaki Frontale)
—	FW	JPN	Kohei Kiyama (from Fagiano Okayama)
—	MF	KOR	Kim Tae-yeon (from Fagiano Okayama)
—	DF	JPN	Colin Killoran (from Tokyo Verdy Youth)
—	GK	JPN	Niall Killoran (from Tokyo Verdy Youth)
—	MF	JPN	Yuki Kobayashi (from Tokyo Verdy Youth)
—	DF	JPN	Koji Takano (from Tokyo Verdy Youth)

Out: Note: Flags indicate national team as defined under FIFA eligibility rules; some limited exceptions apply. Players may hold more than one non-FIFA nationality.

No.	Pos.	Nation	Player
—	DF	JPN	Ryu Hukui (to Giravanz Kitakyushu)
—	MF	JPN	Toshiyuki Takagi (to Shimizu S-Pulse)
—	MF	JPN	Kosei Shibasaki (to Kawasaki Frontale)
—	MF	JPN	Shinichi Mukai (Released, Free agent)
—	DF	JPN	Masaki Iida (Released, Free agent)
—	MF	JPN	Yu Tomidokoro (Released, Free agent)
—	MF	PRK	Lee Chi-Song (Released, Free agent)
—	DF	NGR	Adebayo Adigun (Released, Free agent)
—	FW	JPN	Masashi Oguro (to Yokohama F. Marinos)

=== Yokohama FC ===
In: Note: Flags indicate national team as defined under FIFA eligibility rules; some limited exceptions apply. Players may hold more than one non-FIFA nationality.

No.	Pos.	Nation	Player
—	MF	JPN	Shinichi Terada (from Gamba Osaka)
—	DF	JPN	Masato Fujita (from Yokohama F. Marinos)
—	DF	JPN	Hiroshi Nakano (from Albirex Niigata)
—	FW	JPN	Yoshihito Fujita (from Omiya Ardija)
13	MF	JPN	Yosuke Nozaki (from Sagan Tosu)
—	MF	JPN	Masaki Ideguchi (from Hannan University)
—	MF	JPN	Kensuke Sato (from Chuo University)
—	MF	JPN	Kenji Arabori (from Doshisha University)
—	DF	JPN	Tsukasa Morimoto (from Chukyo University)
—	FW	BRA	Kaio (from Clube Atlético Paranaense)

Out: Note: Flags indicate national team as defined under FIFA eligibility rules; some limited exceptions apply. Players may hold more than one non-FIFA nationality.

No.	Pos.	Nation	Player
—	MF	JPN	Roberto Júlio de Figueiredo (to FC Tokyo)
—	DF	JPN	Takumi Abe (to FC Tokyo)
19	MF	JPN	Yuta Hashimura (to Giravanz Kitakyushu)
—	DF	JPN	Tomonobu Hayakawa (Retired)
—	MF	JPN	Kenta Togawa (Released, Free agent)
—	DF	KOR	Kim Yoo-Jin (Released, Free agent)
—	DF	JPN	Kentaro Nakata (Released, Free agent)
—	FW	JPN	Yuta Nakano (Released, Free agent)
—	MF	JPN	Shingo Nejime (Released, Free agent)
—	MF	JPN	Ken Hisatome (Released, Free agent)
—	GK	JPN	Fumiya Iwamaru (to Roasso Kumamoto)
—	DF	JPN	Tomoyoshi Ono (Released, Free agent)
—	GK	JPN	Takuo Okubo (Released, Free agent)
—	MF	JPN	Atsuhiro Miura (Released, Free agent)

== Japan Football League ==
=== A.C. Nagano Parceiro ===
In: Note: Flags indicate national team as defined under FIFA eligibility rules; some limited exceptions apply. Players may hold more than one non-FIFA nationality.

No.	Pos.	Nation	Player

Out: Note: Flags indicate national team as defined under FIFA eligibility rules; some limited exceptions apply. Players may hold more than one non-FIFA nationality.

No.	Pos.	Nation	Player
—	GK	JPN	Takeshi Unno (Released, Free agent)
—	DF	JPN	Ryota Mitsuhashi (Released, Free agent)
—	DF	JPN	Hiroki Honjo (Released, Free agent)
—	DF	JPN	Makoto Oda (Released, Free agent)
—	MF	JPN	Katsutoshi Mutoh (Released, Free agent)
—	FW	JPN	Yuichi Yoda (Released, Free agent)

=== Arte Takasaki ===
In: Note: Flags indicate national team as defined under FIFA eligibility rules; some limited exceptions apply. Players may hold more than one non-FIFA nationality.

No.	Pos.	Nation	Player

Out: Note: Flags indicate national team as defined under FIFA eligibility rules; some limited exceptions apply. Players may hold more than one non-FIFA nationality.

No.	Pos.	Nation	Player

=== Blaublitz Akita ===
In: Note: Flags indicate national team as defined under FIFA eligibility rules; some limited exceptions apply. Players may hold more than one non-FIFA nationality.

No.	Pos.	Nation	Player
—	GK	JPN	Yusuke Ogane (from Sendai University)
—	DF	JPN	Osamu Takahashi (from Josai University)
—	DF	JPN	Hiroyuki Kobayashi (loan from Oita Trinita)

Out: Note: Flags indicate national team as defined under FIFA eligibility rules; some limited exceptions apply. Players may hold more than one non-FIFA nationality.

No.	Pos.	Nation	Player
—	FW	JPN	Satoshi Yokoyama (Retired)
—	MF	JPN	Masahiro Ikeda (Released, Free agent)
—	DF	JPN	Akiyasu Okamoto (Released, Free agent)
—	MF	JPN	Kazuki Sato (Released, Free agent)
—	FW	JPN	Hideaki Tominaga (Retired)
—	DF	JPN	Kosuke Iwase (Retired)
—	DF	JPN	Masatoshi Ozawa (Retired)
—	DF	JPN	Yuki Inoue (Retired)
—	DF	JPN	Takanori Takahashi (Released, Free agent)
—	GK	JPN	Akihito Ono (Released, Free agent)

=== F.C. Machida Zelvia ===
In: Note: Flags indicate national team as defined under FIFA eligibility rules; some limited exceptions apply. Players may hold more than one non-FIFA nationality.

No.	Pos.	Nation	Player

Out: Note: Flags indicate national team as defined under FIFA eligibility rules; some limited exceptions apply. Players may hold more than one non-FIFA nationality.

No.	Pos.	Nation	Player
—	DF	JPN	Kota Fukatsu (Tokyo Verdy)
—	MF	JPN	Tatsuya Kamohara (Released, Free agent)
—	MF	JPN	Kazuto Ishido (Released, Free agent)
—	MF	JPN	Takeshi Handa (Released, Free agent)
—	DF	JPN	Takayuki Saito (Released, Free agent)
—	DF	JPN	Yusuke Suzuki (Released, Free agent)
—	DF	JPN	Tomohiro Saika (Released, Free agent)
—	DF	JPN	Ryo Nagano (Released, Free agent)
—	GK	JPN	Teppei Shirako (Released, Free agent)
—	GK	JPN	Akihiro Watanabe (Released, Free agent)
—	MF	JPN	Ryo Izuka (to Kamatamare Sanuki)

=== F.C. Ryukyu ===
In: Note: Flags indicate national team as defined under FIFA eligibility rules; some limited exceptions apply. Players may hold more than one non-FIFA nationality.

No.	Pos.	Nation	Player
—	MF	JPN	Toru Matsuuchi (from Higashi Fukuoka High School)
—	FW	JPN	Kazuki Ganaha (from Vissel Kobe)
—	FW	JPN	Shunta Takahashi (from Tochigi UVA F.C.)
—	MF	JPN	Masaya Sato (from Nagoya Grampus)
—	DF	JPN	Ryuji Ito (loan from Yokohama FC)

Out: Note: Flags indicate national team as defined under FIFA eligibility rules; some limited exceptions apply. Players may hold more than one non-FIFA nationality.

No.	Pos.	Nation	Player
—	FW	JPN	Yoshiteru Yamashita (Retired)
—	MF	JPN	Kenji Hada (Released, Free agent)
—	MF	JPN	Shinji Kaneko (Released, Free agent)
—	MF	JPN	Yusuke Nakamura (Released, Free agent)
—	DF	JPN	Yuhei Horike (Released, Free agent)

=== Honda FC ===
In: Note: Flags indicate national team as defined under FIFA eligibility rules; some limited exceptions apply. Players may hold more than one non-FIFA nationality.

No.	Pos.	Nation	Player

Out: Note: Flags indicate national team as defined under FIFA eligibility rules; some limited exceptions apply. Players may hold more than one non-FIFA nationality.

No.	Pos.	Nation	Player

=== Honda Lock ===
In: Note: Flags indicate national team as defined under FIFA eligibility rules; some limited exceptions apply. Players may hold more than one non-FIFA nationality.

No.	Pos.	Nation	Player

Out: Note: Flags indicate national team as defined under FIFA eligibility rules; some limited exceptions apply. Players may hold more than one non-FIFA nationality.

No.	Pos.	Nation	Player

=== Kamatamare Sanuki ===
In: Note: Flags indicate national team as defined under FIFA eligibility rules; some limited exceptions apply. Players may hold more than one non-FIFA nationality.

No.	Pos.	Nation	Player
—	FW	JPN	Ryo Iizuka (from F.C. Machida Zelvia)

Out: Note: Flags indicate national team as defined under FIFA eligibility rules; some limited exceptions apply. Players may hold more than one non-FIFA nationality.

No.	Pos.	Nation	Player
—	GK	JPN	Masaharu Kawahara (Released, Free agent)
—	DF	JPN	Ippei Shimizu (Released, Free agent)
—	MF	JPN	Yasuyuki Miyauchi (Released, Free agent)
—	MF	JPN	Yuta Kobayashi (Released, Free agent)
—	FW	JPN	Atsushi Sasaki (Retired)
—	FW	JPN	Yusaku Asahina (Released, Free agent)
—	FW	JPN	Eiji Morita (Released, Free agent)
—	FW	JPN	Satoshi Wakisaka (Released, Free agent)
—	FW	JPN	Toru Sato (Released, Free agent)

=== Matsumoto Yamaga FC ===
In: Note: Flags indicate national team as defined under FIFA eligibility rules; some limited exceptions apply. Players may hold more than one non-FIFA nationality.

No.	Pos.	Nation	Player
—	FW	JPN	Shogo Shiozawa (from Sagawa Printing SC)
—	MF	JPN	Ken Hisatomi (from Yokohama FC)
—	MF	JPN	Kento Tsurumaki (loan from Tokyo Verdy)
—	DF	JPN	Masaki Iida (loan from Tokyo Verdy)

Out: Note: Flags indicate national team as defined under FIFA eligibility rules; some limited exceptions apply. Players may hold more than one non-FIFA nationality.

No.	Pos.	Nation	Player
—	FW	JPN	Hideaki Takeda (loan return to Fagiano Okayama)
—	FW	JPN	Michiaki Kakimoto (Retired)
—	FW	JPN	Yuki Ishida (Released, Free agent)
—	FW	JPN	Yosuke Kobayashi (Released, Free agent)
—	MF	JPN	Kohei Onishi (Released, Free agent)
—	MF	JPN	Shuichi Ozawa (Released, Free agent)
—	MF	JPN	Tomoharu Saito (Released, Free agent)
—	MF	JPN	Shingo Honda (Released, Free agent)
—	MF	JPN	Masaru Takeuchi (Released, Free agent)
—	MF	JPN	Tsubasa Oshima (Released, Free agent)
—	MF	JPN	Hisatoshi Takazawa (Released, Free agent)
—	DF	JPN	Toru Yamazaki (Released, Free agent)
—	GK	JPN	Hiroaki Hara (Released, Free agent)

=== MIO Biwako Kusatsu ===
In: Note: Flags indicate national team as defined under FIFA eligibility rules; some limited exceptions apply. Players may hold more than one non-FIFA nationality.

No.	Pos.	Nation	Player

Out: Note: Flags indicate national team as defined under FIFA eligibility rules; some limited exceptions apply. Players may hold more than one non-FIFA nationality.

No.	Pos.	Nation	Player
—	GK	JPN	Shota Wakatsuki (Released, Free agent)
—	DF	JPN	Noriaki Ishizawa (Retired)
—	MF	JPN	Koichi Asato (Retired)
—	MF	JPN	Masayuki Nakahama (Retired)
—	MF	JPN	Daisuke Tanaka (Released, Free agent)
—	MF	USA	Oliver Wellman (Released, Free agent)

=== Sagawa Printing SC ===
In: Note: Flags indicate national team as defined under FIFA eligibility rules; some limited exceptions apply. Players may hold more than one non-FIFA nationality.

No.	Pos.	Nation	Player

Out: Note: Flags indicate national team as defined under FIFA eligibility rules; some limited exceptions apply. Players may hold more than one non-FIFA nationality.

No.	Pos.	Nation	Player
—	FW	JPN	Hirokazu Otsubo (Retired)
—	FW	JPN	Shogo Shiozawa (to Matsumoto Yamaga FC)
—	MF	JPN	Yoshiki Nakai (Released, Free agent)
—	MF	JPN	Kazuto Kushida (Released, Free agent)
—	DF	JPN	Yuki Hamaya (Released, Free agent)
—	DF	JPN	Daiki Higuchi (Released, Free agent)
—	DF	JPN	Yusuke Yamagata (Released, Free agent)

=== Sagawa Shiga FC ===
In: Note: Flags indicate national team as defined under FIFA eligibility rules; some limited exceptions apply. Players may hold more than one non-FIFA nationality.

No.	Pos.	Nation	Player

Out: Note: Flags indicate national team as defined under FIFA eligibility rules; some limited exceptions apply. Players may hold more than one non-FIFA nationality.

No.	Pos.	Nation	Player

=== Sony Sendai FC ===
In: Note: Flags indicate national team as defined under FIFA eligibility rules; some limited exceptions apply. Players may hold more than one non-FIFA nationality.

No.	Pos.	Nation	Player

Out: Note: Flags indicate national team as defined under FIFA eligibility rules; some limited exceptions apply. Players may hold more than one non-FIFA nationality.

No.	Pos.	Nation	Player
—	FW	JPN	Goshi Okubo (loan return to Vegalta Sendai)
—	FW	JPN	Tamon Machida (Released, Free agent)
—	FW	JPN	Naoki Miura (Released, Free agent)
—	MF	JPN	Kazutaka Takano (Released, Free agent)
—	MF	JPN	Takashi Konta (Released, Free agent)
—	DF	JPN	Koji Kimura (Released, Free agent)
—	DF	JPN	Ryosuke Amo (Released, Free agent)
—	GK	JPN	Sho Nemoto (Released, Free agent)

=== Tochigi Uva F.C. ===
In: Note: Flags indicate national team as defined under FIFA eligibility rules; some limited exceptions apply. Players may hold more than one non-FIFA nationality.

No.	Pos.	Nation	Player

Out: Note: Flags indicate national team as defined under FIFA eligibility rules; some limited exceptions apply. Players may hold more than one non-FIFA nationality.

No.	Pos.	Nation	Player
—	FW	JPN	Shunta Takahashi (to F.C. Ryukyu)

=== V-Varen Nagasaki ===
In: Note: Flags indicate national team as defined under FIFA eligibility rules; some limited exceptions apply. Players may hold more than one non-FIFA nationality.

No.	Pos.	Nation	Player
—	FW	JPN	Yuichi Yamauchi (from Roasso Kumamoto)
—	MF	JPN	Yasunobu Matsuoka (from Roasso Kumamoto)

Out: Note: Flags indicate national team as defined under FIFA eligibility rules; some limited exceptions apply. Players may hold more than one non-FIFA nationality.

No.	Pos.	Nation	Player
—	FW	JPN	Hiroshi Fukushima (Released, Free agent)
—	FW	JPN	Yuki Miyao (Released, Free agent)
—	FW	JPN	Yosuke Sato (Released, Free agent)
—	FW	JPN	Hirokazu Abe (Released, Free agent)
—	FW	JPN	Kei Kitagawa (Released, Free agent)
—	FW	JPN	Hiroshi Morita (Released, Free agent)
—	FW	JPN	Shohei Tanaka (Released, Free agent)
—	MF	JPN	Takeo Harada (Released, Free agent)
—	MF	JPN	Kazuyuki Otsuka (Released, Free agent)
—	MF	JPN	Yoshiya Takemura (Released, Free agent)
—	MF	JPN	Masayuki Cho (Released, Free agent)
—	MF	JPN	Motoki Kawasaki (Retired)
—	MF	JPN	Toshiyuki Konoya (to Dezzolla Shimane)
—	DF	JPN	Toshikazu Kato (Released, Free agent)
—	DF	JPN	Takaaki Hisadome (Released, Free agent)
—	DF	JPN	Akira Kajiwara (Released, Free agent)
—	DF	JPN	Yu Densho (Released, Free agent)
—	DF	JPN	Yuzo Minami (Released, Free agent)
—	GK	JPN	Takaki Shimanami (Released, Free agent)

=== Yokogawa Musashino FC ===
In: Note: Flags indicate national team as defined under FIFA eligibility rules; some limited exceptions apply. Players may hold more than one non-FIFA nationality.

No.	Pos.	Nation	Player

Out: Note: Flags indicate national team as defined under FIFA eligibility rules; some limited exceptions apply. Players may hold more than one non-FIFA nationality.

No.	Pos.	Nation	Player
—	FW	JPN	Koji Murayama (Retired)
—	MF	JPN	Toshinori Ando (Released, Free agent)
—	DF	JPN	Yoshitaka Tachibana (Retired)

=== Zweigen Kanazawa ===
In: Note: Flags indicate national team as defined under FIFA eligibility rules; some limited exceptions apply. Players may hold more than one non-FIFA nationality.

No.	Pos.	Nation	Player

Out: Note: Flags indicate national team as defined under FIFA eligibility rules; some limited exceptions apply. Players may hold more than one non-FIFA nationality.

No.	Pos.	Nation	Player
—	MF	JPN	Ayato Hasebe (loan return to Albirex Niigata)
—	FW	JPN	Yosuke Saito (loan return to Yokohama F. Marinos)
—	MF	JPN	Yuya Hikichi (loan return to Tokushima Vortis)
—	MF	JPN	Satoru Hayashi (loan return to Shonan Bellmare)
—	FW	JPN	Toshiya Tanaka (Released, Free agent)
—	MF	JPN	Ryota Takahashi (Released, Free agent)
—	DF	JPN	Kazuto Toyoda (Released, Free agent)
—	DF	JPN	Norihiro Kawakami (Released, Free agent)
