= 2010 Mito HollyHock season =

Mito HollyHock
2010 season
- Manager: Takashi Kiyama
- Stadium: K's denki Stadium Mito
- J. League 2: 16th
- Emperor's Cup: 3rd Round
- Top goalscorer: Kota Yoshihara (6); Masato Katayama (6)
Home colours	Away colours

2010 Mito HollyHock season

== Competitions ==
Competitions	Position
J. League 2	16th / 19 clubs
Emperor's Cup	3rd Round

== Player statistics ==
No.	Pos.	Player	D.o.B. (Age)	Height / Weight	J. League 2		Emperor's Cup		Total	
No.	Pos.	Player	D.o.B. (Age)	Height / Weight	Apps	Goals	Apps	Goals	Apps	Goals
1	GK	Koji Homma	April 27, 1977 (aged 32)	cm / kg	33	0				
2	DF	Yuji Fujikawa	June 8, 1987 (aged 22)	cm / kg	24	0				
3	DF	Sunao Hozaki	March 14, 1987 (aged 22)	cm / kg	23	1				
4	DF	Yuji Sakuda	December 4, 1987 (aged 22)	cm / kg	36	2				
5	DF	Hiroki Kato	July 31, 1986 (aged 23)	cm / kg	2	0				
6	DF	Hideyuki Nakamura	June 3, 1984 (aged 25)	cm / kg	18	0				
7	FW	Junki Koike	May 11, 1987 (aged 22)	cm / kg	31	2				
8	MF	Sho Murata	April 2, 1987 (aged 22)	cm / kg	29	0				
9	FW	Kota Yoshihara	February 2, 1978 (aged 32)	cm / kg	24	6				
10	MF	Masahiro Ōhashi	June 23, 1981 (aged 28)	cm / kg	35	1				
11	FW	Keisuke Endo	March 20, 1989 (aged 20)	cm / kg	34	2				
13	FW	Kento Shiratani	June 10, 1989 (aged 20)	cm / kg	4	0				
14	MF	Shota Otsuka	May 15, 1987 (aged 22)	cm / kg	15	0				
15	MF	Yuki Shimada	November 18, 1986 (aged 23)	cm / kg	17	0				
16	MF	Kohei Shimoda	April 8, 1989 (aged 20)	cm / kg	14	0				
17	FW	Satoshi Tokiwa	May 14, 1987 (aged 22)	cm / kg	23	4				
18	MF	Taiki Tsuruno	September 4, 1990 (aged 19)	cm / kg	1	0				
19	MF	Kota Morimura	August 14, 1988 (aged 21)	cm / kg	22	1				
20	MF	Kenta Nishioka	April 15, 1987 (aged 22)	cm / kg	18	0				
21	DF	Keisuke Hoshino	August 21, 1985 (aged 24)	cm / kg	0	0				
22	MF	Kenichi Mori	October 23, 1984 (aged 25)	cm / kg	17	0				
23	GK	Hironobu Ono	July 7, 1987 (aged 22)	cm / kg	0	0				
26	FW	Satoshi Nakayama	November 7, 1981 (aged 28)	cm / kg	17	1				
31	GK	Yoshinobu Harada	May 17, 1986 (aged 23)	cm / kg	4	0				
32	DF	Masashi Owada	July 28, 1981 (aged 28)	cm / kg	32	3				
39	FW	Masato Katayama	April 19, 1984 (aged 25)	cm / kg	29	6				

== Other pages ==
- (in Japanese) J. League official site
