= 2009 Emperor's Cup =

Tournament details
- Country: Japan
- Teams: 88

Final positions
- Champions: Gamba Osaka (3rd title)
- Runners-up: Nagoya Grampus

Tournament statistics
- Matches played: 87
- Top goal scorer: Lucas (8 goals)

The 89th Emperor's Cup began on September 19, 2009 and ended on January 1, 2010 with the final at National Stadium in Tokyo, Japan. Gamba Osaka won the title for the second consecutive season. Since Gamba already confirmed 2010 AFC Champions League berth, the last spot of ACL for J.League club is awarded to Sanfrecce Hiroshima, which finished as 4th place of 2009 J.League Division 1.

== Calendar ==
Round	Dates	Matches	Clubs	New entries this round
First round	September 19–21	24	48 → 24	47 Prefectural Qualifying Cup winners; 1 University Qualifying Cup winning club
Second round	October 10–12	32	24+18+18+4 → 32	18 J1 clubs; 18 J2 clubs; 4 JFL seeded clubs
Third round	October 31 – November 1 November 11	16	32 → 16	
Fourth Round	November 14–15	8	16 → 8	
Quarterfinals	December 12	4	8 → 4	
Semifinals	December 29	2	4 → 2	
Final	January 1, 2010	1	2 → 1	

== Participants ==
=== Starting in the First Round ===
Prefectural finals winners – 47 teams

- Hokkaidō – Norbritz Hokkaido
- Aomori – Hachinohe University
- Iwate – Grulla Morioka
- Miyagi – Sony Sendai
- Akita – TDK SC
- Yamagata – FC Parafrente Yonezawa
- Fukushima – Fukushima United
- Ibaraki – Ryutsu Keizai University
- Tochigi – Vertfee Takahara Nasu
- Gunma – Arte Takasaki
- Saitama – Shobi University
- Chiba – Juntendo University
- Tokyo – Meiji University
- Kanagawa – Tokai University
- Niigata – Japan Soccer College
- Toyama – Valiente Toyama
- Ishikawa – Zweigen Kanazawa
- Fukui – Saurcos Fukui
- Yamanashi – FC Koun
- Nagano – Matsumoto Yamaga
- Gifu – FC Gifu Second
- Shizuoka – Honda FC
- Aichi – FC Kariya
- Mie – Mie Chukyo University
- Shiga – Biwako Seikei Sport College
- Kyoto – SP Kyoto
- Osaka – Kansai University
- Hyōgo – Kwansei Gakuin University
- Nara – Nara Club
- Wakayama – Arterivo Wakayama
- Tottori – Tottori Dreams FC
- Shimane – Hamada FC Cosmos
- Okayama – Mitsubishi Mizushima FC
- Hiroshima – Fukuyama University
- Yamaguchi – Renofa Yamaguchi
- Tokushima – Tokushima Vortis Second
- Kagawa – Kamatamare Sanuki
- Ehime – Ehime FC Shimanami
- Kochi – Kochi University
- Fukuoka – New Wave Kitakyushu
- Saga – Saga Higashi High School
- Nagasaki – V-Varen Nagasaki
- Kumamoto – Kumamoto Gakuen University
- Ōita – Nippon Bunri University
- Miyazaki – Honda Lock
- Kagoshima – NIFS Kanoya
- Okinawa – Okinawa Kariyushi FC

Prime Minister Cup University football tournament winners – 1 team

- Fukuoka University

=== Starting in the Second Round ===
J.League Division 1 – 18 teams

- Montedio Yamagata
- Kashima Antlers
- Omiya Ardija
- Urawa Red Diamonds
- Kashiwa Reysol
- JEF United Chiba
- FC Tokyo
- Kawasaki Frontale
- Yokohama F. Marinos
- Shimizu S-Pulse
- Júbilo Iwata
- Nagoya Grampus
- Albirex Niigata
- Kyoto Sanga
- Gamba Osaka
- Vissel Kobe
- Sanfrecce Hiroshima
- Oita Trinita

J.League Division 2 – 18 teams

- Consadole Sapporo
- Vegalta Sendai
- Mito HollyHock
- Tochigi SC
- Thespa Kusatsu
- Tokyo Verdy
- Yokohama FC
- Shonan Bellmare
- Ventforet Kofu
- Kataller Toyama
- FC Gifu
- Cerezo Osaka}
- Fagiano Okayama
- Tokushima Vortis
- Ehime FC
- Avispa Fukuoka
- Sagan Tosu
- Roasso Kumamoto

Japan Football League – 4 teams

- Sagawa Shiga
- Gainare Tottori
- Yokogawa Musashino
- JEF Reserves

※Clubs ranked from first to fourth at the end of the 17th week of 2009 Japan Football League.

== Matches ==
All matches are Japan Standard Time (UTC+9)

=== First round ===
2009-09-20
13:00

Arte Takasaki	3–0	FC Koun
Okoshi 43'; Kubota 61'; Otani 71'	Report

Shikishima Park Soccer/Rugby Stadium, Maebashi
Attendance: 547
Referee: Tomohiro Tsukada

2009-09-20
13:00

Tokai University	1–0	Juntendo University
Hayasaki 15'	Report

Yamato Sports Center Athletic Stadium, Yamato
Attendance: 713
Referee: Toshihito Fujita

2009-09-19
15:00

FC Gifu Second	1–3	Japan Soccer College
Matsue 69' (pen.)	Report	Ueda 44'; Unozawa 65', 80'

Nagaragawa Meadow, Gifu
Attendance: 560
Referee: Takao Onshi

2009-09-20
13:00

Arterivo Wakayama	2–3	Saga Higashi High School
Tamaru 21'; Shin 88'	Report	Okamoto 30'; Okizaki 57'; Matsuyama 83'

Kimitsuidera Park Athletic Stadium Wakayama
Attendance: 1,122
Referee: Tadasu Baba

2009-09-20
13:00

Ryutsu Keizai University	5–0	Parafrente Yonezawa
Chyan 15', 46'; Chigira 30', 56'; Frank Romero 44'	Report

Hitachinaka Athletic Recreation Park Stadium, Hitachinaka
Attendance: 458
Referee: Kenta Tsukada

2009-09-19
13:00

Norbritz Hokkaido	0–4	Fukuoka University
	Report	Muta 15'; Nagai 22'; Ishizu 42', 70'

Sapporo Atsubetsu Park Stadium, Sapporo
Attendance: 572
Referee: Eiji Kawai

2009-09-20
13:00

Fukuyama University	0–1	V-Varen Nagasaki
	Report	Kounoya 82'

Takegahana Park Athletic Stadium, Fukuyama
Attendance: 2,018
Referee: Haruki Hidaka

2009-09-20
13:00

Fukushima United	3 – 3 (a.e.t.)	Shobi University
Murase 22', 83'; Tokisaki 36'	Report	Yamamoto 6', 7'; Otani 63'
Penalties
Kisu Kim (penalty scored); Konchyon Kim (penalty scored); Fukasawa (penalty missed); Kanaoya (penalty scored)	3–1	(penalty scored) Yamamoto; (penalty missed) Ebisawa; (penalty missed) Takeutsu; (penalty missed) Kanai

J Village Stadium, Futaba
Attendance: 665
Referee: Daisuke Sakurai

2009-09-19
13:00

Mitsubishi Mizushima	1 – 1 (a.e.t.)	Renofa Yamaguchi
Yamashita 83' (pen.)	Report	Ono 20'
Penalties
Yamashita (penalty scored); Tahira (penalty missed); Matsushita (penalty scored); Isao (penalty scored); Onoe (penalty scored); Gatou (penalty scored); Hagiuda (penalty scored); Inoya (penalty missed)	6–7	(penalty scored) Fukuhara; (penalty missed) Ono; (penalty scored) Kashihara; (penalty scored) Yasuda; (penalty scored) Ito; (penalty scored) Yoshiji; (penalty scored) Yoshida; (penalty scored) Kodama

Momotaro Stadium, Okayama
Attendance: 510
Referee: Takanori Sakumoto

2009-09-19
13:00

Kamatamare Sanuki	1–0	Tottori Dreams
Sato 52'	Report

Kagawa Prefectural Soccer/Rugby Stadium, Takamatsu
Attendance: 430
Referee: Hiromichi Oka

2009-09-19
13:00

TDK SC	1–2	Sony Sendai
Yokoyama 16'	Report	Machida 32'; Konta 65'

Akita Athletics Stadium, Akita
Attendance: 392
Referee: Hiosaharu Kitamura

2009-09-20
13:00

Zweigen Kanazawa	1 – 0 (a.e.t.)	Kwansei Gakuin University
Furube 111'	Report

West Ryokuchi Park Athletic Stadium, Kanazawa
Attendance: 2,168
Referee: Kazuo Takeda

2009-09-19
13:00

Matsumoto Yamaga	1–0	FC Kariya
Kakimoto 28'	Report

Matsumoto Stadium, Matsumoto
Attendance: 1,469
Referee: Ryo Hirama

2009-09-19
13:00

Mie Chukyo University	0–7	Honda FC
	Report	Nitta 24', 79'; 35' (o.g.); Suzuki 36'; 70' (o.g.); Kawashima 71'; Hayasaka 89'

Mie Prefectural Suzuka Sports Garden Soccer/Rugby Field, Suzuka
Attendance: 851
Referee: Hiroshi Yamauchi

2009-09-20
15:00

Okinawa Kariyushi	4–1	Tokushima Vortis Second
Sakurada 12', 41' (pen.); Asano 35'; Kishima 43'	Report	Sakashi 56'

Chatan Park Athletic Stadium, Chatan
Attendance: 459
Referee: Koichiro Fukushima

2009-09-20
13:00

Honda Lock	4–0	Kumamoto Gakuen University
Harada 19', 43', 50'; Yamasaki 48'	Report

Ikimenomori Park Athletic Park, Miyazaki
Attendance: 978
Referee: Tetsuro Yoshida

2009-09-21
13:00

Ehime FC Shimanami	0–4	Kochi University
	Report	Kagawa 39'; Sanetou 60'; Shibano 73', 84'

Ningineer Stadium, Matsuyama
Attendance: 698
Referee: Ushio Kosone

2009-09-21
13:00

NIFS Kanoya	2–0	Hamada FC Cosmos
Yonamine 12'; Nakasuji 57'	Report

Kamoike Park Athletic Stadium, Kagoshima
Attendance: 582
Referee: Yukimasa Anai

2009-09-20
13:00

Nippon Bunri University	1–0	New Wave Kitakyushu
Sunamoto 60'	Report

Ōita Sports Park Soccer/Rugby Stadium, Ōita
Attendance: 285
Referee: Mitsuharu Takeda

2009-09-20
13:00

Grulla Morioka	2–4	Meiji University
Nakata 13', 89'	Report	Yamada 2'; Hida 43'; Yamamura 63'; Sakano 78'

Morioka South Park Stadium, Morioka
Attendance: 647
Referee: Ippei Otomo

2009-09-20
13:00

Nara Club	1–0	Saurcos Fukui
Yabe 61'	Report

Kashihara Park Athletic Stadium, Kashihara
Attendance: 620
Referee: Akihiko Ikeuchi

2009-09-21
13:00

Biwako Seikei Sport College	0–1	SP Kyoto
	Report	Nakai 17'

Ōjiyama Athletic Stadium, Ōtsu
Attendance: 657
Referee: Akihiro Takeda

2009-09-20
13:00

Vertfee Takahara Nasu	4 – 3 (a.e.t.)	Hachinohe University
Honda 22'; Takahide 101'; Tanekura 107'; Etou 112'	Report	Imano 87'; Horie 95'; Sato 114'

Tochigi Athletic Recreation Park Stadium, Tochigi
Attendance: 454
Referee: Takumi Shinofuji

2009-09-20
13:00

Valiente Toyama	0–7	Kansai University
	Report	Kanazono 22', 69'; Tanaka 51'; Nishioka 60'; Kiyomi 63' (pen.); Nishiguchi 73'; Sato 79'

Toyama Athletic Recreation Park Stadium, Toyama
Attendance: 635
Referee: Masashi Yamagiwa

=== Second round ===
2009-10-11
13:00

Kashima Antlers	1–0	Arte Takasaki
Marquinhos 79'	Report

Kashima Soccer Stadium, Kashima
Attendance: 5,040
Referee: Kouji Tanabe

2009-10-11
13:00

Ehime FC	2 – 2 (a.e.t.)	Avispa Fukuoka
Dodo 22'; Uchimura 44'	Report	Kurobe 41'; Nakaharai 72'
Penalties
Tanaka (penalty missed); Mikami (penalty missed); Tamori (penalty scored); Uchida (penalty scored)	2–4	(penalty scored) Takahashi; (penalty scored) Nakajima; (penalty scored) Suzuki; (penalty scored) S. Abe

Ningineer Stadium, Matsuyama
Attendance: 1,216
Referee: Yuudai Yamamoto

2009-10-11
13:00

Vissel Kobe	5–0	Tokai University
Mogi 10', 27', 40'; Ishibitsu 47'; Botti 67' (pen.)	Report

Home's Stadium Kobe, Kobe
Attendance: 2,587
Referee: Hirofumi Yamanishi

2009-10-11
13:00

Kashiwa Reysol	0 – 0 (a.e.t.)	JEF Reserves
	Report
Penalties
Kurisawa (penalty scored); Otani (penalty scored); Suganuma (penalty missed); França (penalty scored); Murakami (penalty scored)	4–2	(penalty missed) Ichihara; (penalty scored) Hasunuma; (penalty scored) Inui; (penalty missed) Fukuda

Kashiwa no Ha Park Stadium, Kashiwa
Attendance: 3,432
Referee: Masayoshi Okada

2009-10-11
13:00

Sanfrecce Hiroshima	5–0	Japan Soccer College
Hattori 9'; Takahagi 25'; Kashiwagi 37'; Takayanagi 53'; Hirashige 80'	Report

Hiroshima Stadium, Hiroshima
Attendance: 3,485
Referee: Tadashi Kouse

2009-10-10
13:00

Sagan Tosu	5–0	Saga Higashi High School
Yamase 44'; 63' (o.g.); Tozin 72'; Ikeda 88'; Samuel 89'	Report

Saga Prefectural Athletic Recreation Park Stadium, Saga
Attendance: 4,249
Referee: Kazuyuki Hayagawa

2009-10-11
13:00

Gamba Osaka	5–2	Ryutsu Keizai University
Sasaki 28'; Myojin 34'; Pedro Júnior 37'; Bando 53'; Lucas 81'	Report	Hosogai 19'; Fuyama 39'

Osaka Expo '70 Stadium, Osaka
Attendance: 3,090
Referee: Kazuhiko Matsumura

2009-10-10
15:00

Mito HollyHock	2 – 3 (a.e.t.)	Fukuoka University
Arata 9', 55'	Report	Fujita 8'; Tahashi 70'; Nagai 97'

Hitachinaka Athletic Recreation Park Stadium, Hitachinaka
Attendance: 827
Referee: Masaaki Iemoto

2009-10-11
13:00

V-Varen Nagasaki	0–4	Yokohama F. Marinos
	Report	Sakata 14'; Watanabe 44', 51', 56'

Nagasaki Prefectural Athletic Recreation Park Stadium, Nagasaki
Attendance: 5,017
Referee: Hiroki Noda

2009-10-11
13:00

Cerezo Osaka	1–2	Fukushima United
Inui 44' (pen.)	Report	Odagiri 13'; Tokisaki 89'

Nagai Stadium, Osaka
Attendance: 2,449
Referee: Ryouichi Imamura

2009-10-11
13:00

Kawasaki Frontale	6–1	Renofa Yamaguchi
Chong Tese 22', 46', 54'; Renatinho 59', 77' (pen.); Igawa 88'	Report	Kashihara 23'

Todoroki Athletics Stadium, Kawasaki
Attendance: 4,855
Referee: Kenshi Oogiya

2009-10-11
13:00

Kataller Toyama	0 – 0 (a.e.t.)	Fagiano Okayama
	Report
Penalties
Kamizono (penalty scored); Nagayama (penalty scored); Funatsu (penalty scored); Nishino (penalty scored)	4–1	(penalty missed) Takeda; (penalty missed) Kiyama; (penalty scored) Kobayashi

Toyama Athletic Recreation Park Stadium, Toyama
Attendance: 2,222
Referee: Yoshirou Imamura

2009-10-11
15:00

FC Tokyo	4–0	Kamatamare Sanuki
Kajiyama 10'; Suzuki 16'; Bruno Quadros 35'; Akamine 42'	Report

Ajinomoto Stadium, Chōfu
Attendance: 7,203
Referee: Tomohiro Igami

2009-10-10
13:00

Thespa Kusatsu	3–1	Sagawa Shiga
Sakurada 37'; Goto 43'; Tokura 46'	Report	Yamane 79'

Shikishima Park Soccer/Rugby Stadium, Maebashi
Attendance: 1,604
Referee: Tetsuo Yoshida

2009-10-11
13:00

Sony Sendai	2–4	Omiya Ardija
Machida 85'; Okubo 86'	Report	Ichikawa 20', 72'; Dudu 22'; Neretljak 82'

Akita Athletics Stadium, Akita
Attendance: 681
Referee: Nobutsugu Murakami

2009-10-10
13:00

Vegalta Sendai	1 – 0 (a.e.t.)	Zweigen Kanazawa
Sekiguchi 90'	Report

Sendai Stadium, Sendai
Attendance: 4,429
Referee: Eiji Kawai

2009-10-11
13:00

Matsumoto Yamaga	2–0	Urawa Red Diamonds
Kakimoto 12'; T. Abe 72'	Report

Matsumoto Stadium, Matsumoto
Attendance: 14,494
Referee: Junpei Iida

2009-10-11
13:00

FC Gifu	1–0	Tochigi SC
Satō 55'	Report

Nagaragawa Stadium, Gifu
Attendance: 2,345
Referee: Hiroshi Tamura

2009-10-11
13:00

Oita Trinita	3 – 3 (a.e.t.)	Yokogawa Musashino
Takamatsu 76'; Kanazaki 89'; Higashi 99'	Report	Ikegami 50'; Kanamori 63'; Koyama 113'
Penalties
Ienaga (penalty scored); Takamatsu (penalty missed); Fernandinho (penalty missed); Miyazawa (penalty scored); Higashi (penalty scored); Fujita (penalty scored)	4–3	(penalty scored) Ikegami; (penalty missed) Takahashi; (penalty scored) Ohta; (penalty missed) Hayashi; (penalty scored) Kanamori; (penalty missed) Tomioka

Ōita City Athletics Stadium, Ōita
Attendance: 2,645
Referee: Tsutomu Anazawa

2009-10-12
13:00

JEF United Chiba	3–0	Honda FC
Maki 49'; Wada 62'; Arai 81'	Report

Fukuda Denshi Arena, Chiba
Attendance: 5,456

2009-10-10
13:00

Nagoya Grampus	4–0	Okinawa Kariyushi FC
Alex 42' (pen.); Burzanović 68', 80'; Maki 86'	Report

Kariya Municipal Athletic Park, Kariya
Attendance: 2,503
Referee: Akio Okutani

2009-10-11
13:00

Tokyo Verdy	0–1	Honda Lock
	Report	Fujita 84' (pen.)

Nishigaoka National Stadium, Tokyo
Attendance: 1,696
Referee: Akahiko Ikeuchi

2009-10-11
13:00

Júbilo Iwata	2–0	Kochi University
Inuzuka 42'; Funatani 81'	Report

Yamaha Stadium, Iwata
Attendance: 2,355
Referee: Hiroyoshi Takayama

2009-10-11
13:00

Tokushima Vortis	1–3	NIFS Kanoya
Kuranuki 3'	Report	Momoi 13', 39', 89'

Tokushima Stadium, Tokushima
Attendance: 946
Referee: Hisaharu Kitamura

2009-10-11
13:00

Montedio Yamagata	2–0	Nippon Bunri University
Akahoshi 29'; Hirose 33'	Report

Yamagata Park Stadium, Tendō
Attendance: 2,181
Referee: Masaki Nabeshima

2009-10-10
15:00

Shonan Bellmare	0–1	Meiji University
	Report	Mita 31'

Hiratsuka Athletics Stadium, Hiratsuka
Attendance: 1,839
Referee: Daisuke Sakurai

2009-10-11
13:00

Nara Club	0–3	Albirex Niigata
	Report	Éverton Santos 6', 15'; Yano 43'

Techno Port Fukui Stadium. Fukui
Attendance: 3,865
Referee: Jouji Kashihara

2009-10-11
19:00

Roasso Kumamoto	2 – 2 (a.e.t.)	Yokohama FC
Yoshii 49'; Nishimori 115'	Report	Yathuda 72'; Nanba 119'
Penalties
Nishimori (penalty scored); Fukuo (penalty missed); Yano (penalty missed); Nakayama (penalty scored)	2–4	(penalty scored) Ahn Hyo-Yeon; (penalty scored) Katayama; (penalty scored) Yathuda; (penalty scored) Nishida

KKWing Stadium, Kumamoto
Attendance: 3,109
Referee: Naohito Ogawa

2009-10-11
13:00

Shimizu S-Pulse	2–0	SP Kyoto
Hara 46'; Marcos Paulo 82'	Report

Nihondaira Sports Stadium, Shizuoka
Attendance: 5,341
Referee: Toshimitsu Yoshida

2009-10-11
13:00

Consadole Sapporo	2–1	Gainare Tottori
Nishijima 28'; Quirino 87' (pen.)	Report	Tomiyama 7'

Sapporo Atsubetsu Park Stadium, Sapporo
Attendance: 3,171
Referee: Hiroshi Yamauchi

2009-10-10
13:00

Kyoto Sanga	4–0	Vertfee Takahara Nasu
Hayashi 15'; Yanagisawa 24'; Miyayoshi 76'; Diego 79'	Report

Nishikyogoku Athletic Stadium, Kyoto
Attendance: 1,981
Referee: Takuto Okabe

2009-10-11
13:00

Ventforet Kofu	3 – 3 (a.e.t.)	Kansai University
Toma 39'; Kim Sin-Young 62'; Maranhão 82'	Report	Kanazono 21', 61'; Sato 34'
Penalties
Yamamoto (penalty scored); Morita (penalty scored); Maranhão (penalty scored); Kuniyoshi (penalty missed); Hayashi (penalty scored)	4–3	(penalty scored) Kiyomi; (penalty scored) Hirano; (penalty scored) Usami; (penalty missed) Nishioka; (penalty missed) Kanazono

Kose Sports Stadium, Kōfu
Attendance: 3,605
Referee: Hiroyuki Onishi

=== Third round ===
2009-10-31

Kashima Antlers	3–0	Avispa Fukuoka
Koroki 22'; Nozawa 35'; Danilo 42'	Report

Kashima Soccer Stadium, Kashima
Attendance: 4,610
Referee: Kazuhiko Matsumura

2009-10-31

Vissel Kobe	1–0	Kashiwa Reysol
Ōkubo 69'	Report

Home's Stadium Kobe, Kobe
Attendance: 3,256
Referee: Kiwamu Hirose

2009-10-31

Sanfrecce Hiroshima	2–3	Sagan Tosu
Morita 53'; Satō 56'	Report	Yamase 17'; Watanabe 61'; Havenaar 89'

Coca-Cola West Hiroshima Stadium, Hiroshima
Attendance: 4,003
Referee: Tomasz Mikulski

2009-10-31

Gamba Osaka	6–1	Fukuoka University
Endō 21'; Lucas 33', 53', 64'; Kaji 58'; Shimohira 87'	Report	Nagai 49'

Osaka Expo '70 Stadium, Osaka
Attendance: 3,459
Referee: Hajime Matsuo

2009-11-01

Yokohama F. Marinos	4–1	Fukushima United
Watanabe 11'; Sakata 17'; Tanaka 43'; Kano 74'	Report	Tokisaki 72'

Nissan Stadium, Yokohama
Attendance: 5,499
Referee: Toshimitsu Yoshida

2009-11-11

Kawasaki Frontale	3–1	Kataller Toyama
Kurotsu 29'; Kimura 70'; Yajima 78'	Report	Kawasaki 44'

Todoroki Athletics Stadium, Kawasaki
Attendance: 4,014
Referee: Masayoshi Okada

2009-11-11

FC Tokyo	3–2	Thespa Kusatsu
Sahara 32'; Nakamura 63'; Hirayama 76'	Report	Tokura 58'; Takada 81'

Ajinomoto Stadium, Chōfu
Attendance: 1,684
Referee: Ryuuji Satou

2009-10-31

Omiya Ardija	1 – 2 (a.e.t.)	Vegalta Sendai
Neretljak 37' (pen.)	Report	Nakashima 27'; Ryang Yong-Gi 102'

NACK 5 Stadium Omiya, Saitama
Attendance: 5,489
Referee: Yuuichi Nishimura

2009-10-31

Matsumoto Yamaga	1–4	FC Gifu
Kobayashi 60'	Report	Yoshimoto 22'; Satō 55'; Takagi 81' (pen.); Nishikawa 85'

Akita Prefectural Yabase Athletic Stadium, Akita
Attendance: 560
Referee: Jouji Kashihara

2009-11-01

Oita Trinita	2–3	JEF United Chiba
Kanazaki 77', 89'	Report	Kudo 28'; Yonekura 68', 86'

Ōita Stadium, Ōita
Attendance: 5,010
Referee: Junpei Iida

2009-11-01

Nagoya Grampus	2–0	Honda Lock
Yoshimura 68'; 78' (o.g.)	Report

Mizuho Athletic Stadium, Nagoya
Attendance: 2,807
Referee: Tomohiro Igami

2009-10-31

Júbilo Iwata	3 – 1 (a.e.t.)	NIFS Kanoya
Nasu 16'; Lee Keun-ho 91'; Maeda 119'	Report	Nakasuji 89'

Yamaha Stadium, Iwata
Attendance: 2,358
Referee: Minoru Toujou

2009-10-31

Montedio Yamagata	0–3	Meiji University
	Report	Mita 27'; Yamamoto 60'; Sakano 85'

ND Soft Stadium Yamagata, Tendō
Attendance: 2,870
Referee: Hiroki Noda

2009-10-31

Albirex Niigata	3–1	Yokohama FC
Matsuo 17'; Yano 28'; Márcio Richardes 89'	Report	Namba 8'

Tohoku Electric Power Big Swan Stadium, Niigata
Attendance: 7,733
Referee: Takuto Okabe

2009-10-31

Shimizu S-Pulse	2–0	Consadole Sapporo
Nagai 1', 20'	Report

Outsourcing Stadium Nihondaira, Shizuoka
Attendance: 5,101
Referee: Hiroyoshi Takayama

2009-10-31

Kyoto Sanga	1 – 2 (a.e.t.)	Ventforet Kofu
Toyoda 21'	Report	Kim Sin-Young 35'; Katagiri 107'

Nishikyogoku Athletic Stadium, Kyoto
Attendance: 2,812
Referee: Akio Okutani

=== Fourth round ===
2009-11-14
15:00

Kashima Antlers	2–1	Vissel Kobe
Nozawa 55'; Danilo 88'	Report	Ishibitsu 48'

Kashima Soccer Stadium, Kashima
Attendance: 4,033
Referee: Hirofumi Yamanishi

2009-11-14
13:00

Sagan Tosu	1–3	Gamba Osaka
Havenaar 47'	Report	Lucas 9' (pen.); Pedro Júnior 40'; Myojin 50'

Hiroshima Big Arch, Hiroshima
Attendance: 2,045
Referee: Tadashi Ouse

2009-11-15
15:00

Yokohama F. Marinos	1–2	Kawasaki Frontale
Yamase 57'	Report	Juninho 32'; Yajima 85'

Nissan Stadium, Yokohama
Attendance: 10,120
Referee: Hiroki Noda

2009-11-15
13:00

FC Tokyo	0–3	Vegalta Sendai
	Report	Nakahara 25'; Nakashima 59'; Marcelo Soares 89'

Marugame Stadium, Marugame
Attendance: 4,504
Referee: Koushi Tanabe

2009-11-15
13:00

FC Gifu	1–0	JEF United Chiba
Yoshimoto 45'	Report

Kumagaya Sports Culture Park Athletics Stadium, Kumagaya
Attendance: 3,569
Referee: Takuto Okabe

2009-11-15
15:00

Nagoya Grampus	3–1	Júbilo Iwata
Yoshimura 42'; Yoshida 52'; Sugimoto 83'	Report	Cullen 5'

Mizuho Athletic Stadium, Nagoya
Attendance: 6,091
Referee: Hajime Matsuo

2009-11-15
13:00

Meiji University	1–3	Albirex Niigata
Yamamoto 46'	Report	Oshima 16'; Yano 40', 64'

Yamagata Park Stadium, Tendō
Attendance: 3,313
Referee: Junpei Iida

2009-11-14
13:00

Shimizu S-Pulse	3–0	Ventforet Kofu
Hara 33'; Morita 49' (o.g.); Nagasawa 55'	Report

Tottori Bank Bird Stadium, Tottori
Attendance: 3,288
Referee: Tomohiro Igami

=== Quarter finals ===
2009-12-12
15:00

Kashima Antlers	1–2	Gamba Osaka
Tashiro 45'	Report	Yamazaki 29', 68'

Kashima Soccer Stadium, Kashima
Attendance: 11,053
Referee: Yuichi Nishimura

2009-12-12
13:00

Vegalta Sendai	2 – 1 (a.e.t.)	Kawasaki Frontale
Nakashima 36'; Hirase 108'	Report	Murakami 89'

Yurtec Stadium Sendai, Sendai
Attendance: 18,340
Referee: Minoru Tojo

2009-12-13
15:00

Nagoya Grampus	3–0	FC Gifu
Kennedy 44', 67', 81'	Report

Mizuho Athletic Stadium, Nagoya
Attendance: 12,211
Referee: Ryuji Sato

2009-12-12
13:00

Shimizu S-Pulse	3 – 2 (a.e.t.)	Albirex Niigata
Okazaki 12'; Johnsen 86'; Kodama 104'	Report	Matsushita 16' (pen.); Yano 88'

Outsourcing Stadium Nihondaira, Shizuoka
Attendance: 7,905
Referee: Hajime Matsuo

=== Semi finals ===
2009-12-29
15:00

Gamba Osaka	2–1	Vegalta Sendai
Lucas 3', 65'	Report	Nakahara 58'

National Stadium, Tokyo
Attendance: 25,878
Referee: Haroyoshi Takayama

2009-12-29
13:00

Shimizu S-Pulse	1 – 1 (a.e.t.)	Nagoya Grampus
Okazaki 16'	Report	Tamada 56' (pen.)
Penalties
Ichikawa (penalty missed); Kodama (penalty scored); Hara (penalty scored); Okazaki (penalty scored)	3–5	(penalty scored) Kennedy; (penalty scored) Alex; (penalty scored) K. Tamada; (penalty scored) Ogawa; (penalty scored) Sugimoto

Shizuoka Stadium, Fukuroi
Attendance: 19,578
Referee: Masaaki Iemoto

=== Final ===
2010-01-01
14:00

Gamba Osaka	4–1	Nagoya Grampus
Lucas 6'; Endō 77', 90+2'; Futagawa 86'	Report	Nakamura 40'

National Stadium, Tokyo
Attendance: 42,140
Referee: Kenji Oogiya
