= Yusuke Nakamura =

Yusuke Nakamura may refer to:

- Yusuke Nakamura (footballer) (中村 友亮, born 1986), Japanese footballer
- Yusuke Nakamura (geneticist) (中村 祐輔, born 1952), Japanese geneticist and cancer researcher
