= Yōhei =

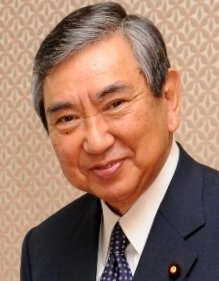
- Yohei Kono, Japanese politician
- Pronunciation: joɯhei (IPA)
- Gender: Male

Origin
- Origin: Japanese
- Meaning: Different meanings depending on the kanji used

Other names
- Alternative spelling: Yohei (Kunrei-shiki); Yohei (Nihon-shiki); Yōhei, Yohei, Youhei (Hepburn); Yoohei

Yōhei, Yohei, Youhei, Yohhei or Yoohei is a masculine Japanese given name.

== Written forms ==
Yōhei can be written using different combinations of kanji characters. Some examples:

- 洋平, "ocean, flat/peace"
- 洋兵, "ocean, soldier"
- 瑶平, "precious stone, flat/peace"
- 陽平, "sunshine, flat/peace"
- 陽兵, "sunshine, soldier"
- 容平, "contain, flat/peace"
- 燿平, "shine, flat/peace"
- 燿兵, "shine, soldier"
- 葉平, "leaf, flat/peace"
- 庸平, "common, flat/peace"

The name can also be written in hiragana ようへい or katakana ヨウヘイ.

== Notable people with the name ==
- Yohei Azakami (阿座上 洋平; born 1991), Japanese voice actor
- Yohei Fujita (藤田 洋平; born 1988), Japanese professional wrestler
- Yohei Fukumoto (福元 洋平; born 1987), Japanese footballer
- Yohei Hayashi (林 容平; born 1989), Japanese footballer
- Yohei Iwasaki (岩崎 陽平; born 1987), Japanese footballer
- Yohei Kajiyama (梶山 陽平; born 1985), Japanese footballer
- Yoohei Kawakami (川上 洋平; born 1982), Japanese musician
- Yohei Komatsu (小松 洋平; born 1988), Japanese professional wrestler
- Yohei Kono (河野 洋平; born 1937), Japanese politician
- Yohei Kotobeppu (琴別府 要平; born 1965), Japanese sumo wrestler
- Yohei Kurakawa (藏川 洋平; born 1977), Japanese footballer
- Yohei Matsumoto (松本 洋平; born 1973), Japanese politician
- Yohei Naito (内藤 洋平; born 1988), Japanese footballer
- Yohei Nakada (中田 洋平; born 1983), Japanese footballer
- Yohei Nishibe (西部 洋平; born 1980), Japanese footballer
- Yohei Onishi (大西 容平; born 1982), Japanese footballer
- Yohei Oshima (大島 洋平; born 1985), Japanese baseball player
- Yohei Otake (大竹 洋平; born 1989), Japanese footballer
- Yohei Sakai (坂井 洋平; born 1986), Japanese footballer
- Yohei Sasakawa (笹川 陽平; born 1939), Japanese activist
- Yohei Sato (佐藤 洋平; born 1972), Japanese footballer
- Yohei Takai (高井 洋平; born 1982), Japanese judoka
- Yohei Takasu (高須 洋平; born 1981), Japanese footballer
- Yohei Takeda (武田 洋平; born 1987), Japanese footballer
- Yohei Taniike (谷池 洋平; born 1977), Japanese footballer
- Yohei Toyoda (豊田 陽平; born 1985), Japanese footballer

== Fictional characters ==
- Yohei Sunohara (春原 陽平), character in the visual novel Clannad
- Yohei Hama (浜 洋平 Hama Yōhei) - Blue Turbo (ブルーターボ Burū Tābo), character in Kousoku Sentai Turboranger
- Yohei Yamada (山田 ヨウヘイ), character from the anime and manga Chi's Sweet Home.
