= Nishimori =

Nishimori (written: 西森 lit. "west forest") is a Japanese surname. Notable people with the surname include:

- Akira Nishimori (西森 章, born 1961), Japanese anime director
- Hiroyuki Nishimori (西森 博之, born 1963), Japanese manga artist
- Masaaki Nishimori (西森 正明, born 1985), Japanese footballer
