= Nagayama =

Nagayama is a Japanese surname, with multiple Kanji spellings and meanings.

Spellings of the name include; 永山 meaning "long mountain", 長山 meaning "chief mountain".

== People ==
- Nagayama Eita (born 1982), Japanese actor from Tokyo
- Kazuya Nagayama (born 1982), Japanese football player
- Kozo Nagayama (born 1956), Japanese television and film director
- Kunio Nagayama (born 1970), former Japanese football player
- Norio Nagayama (1949–1997), Japanese spree killer and novelist
- Osamu Nagayama (born 1947), Japanese CEO of Chugai Pharmaceutical and Chairman of Sony Corporation
- Takashi Nagayama (born 1978), Japanese actor
- Nagayama Takeshirō (永山 武四郎; 1837–1904), Japanese government minister
- Yōko Nagayama (born 1968), Japanese enka singer, former J-pop singer, and actress

== Other uses ==
Stations

- Kita-Nagayama Station
- Minami-Nagayama Station
- Nagayama Station (Aichi)
- Nagayama Station (Hokkaido)
- Nagayama Station (Tokyo)

Geography

- Mount Nagayama
