= Ryosuke Amo =

Japanese footballer

Personal information
- Date of birth: September 19, 1983 (age 43)
- Place of birth: Tokushima, Japan
- Height: 1.77 m (5 ft 9 1/2 in)
- Position: Defender

Youth career
- 2002–2005: Chuo University

Senior career*
Years	Team	Apps	(Gls)
2006–2007	Tokushima Vortis	22	(0)
2008–2010	Sony Sendai	48	(2)
2011–2013	Kamatamare Sanuki	68	(1)
2014–2015	FC Osaka	26	(0)
Total		164	(3)
- * Club domestic league appearances and goals

Ryosuke Amo (天羽 良輔, Amō Ryōsuke; born July 1, 1983) is a former Japanese football player.

== Club statistics ==
Club performance			League		Cup		Total	
Season	Club	League	Apps	Goals	Apps	Goals	Apps	Goals
Japan			League		Emperor's Cup		Total	
2006	Tokushima Vortis	J2 League	20	0	0	0	20	0
2007	Tokushima Vortis	J2 League	2	0	0	0	2	0
2008	Sony Sendai	Football League	12	0	3	0	15	0
2009	Sony Sendai	Football League	18	2	2	0	20	2
2010	Sony Sendai	Football League						
Total	Japan		52	2	5	0	57	2
Career total			52	2	5	0	57	2
