= Satoshi Nakayama =

Japanese footballer (born 1981)

Satoshi Nakayama 中山 悟志
Personal information
- Full name: Satoshi Nakayama
- Date of birth: November 7, 1981 (age 45)
- Place of birth: Miyazaki, Japan
- Height: 1.84 m (6 ft 1/2 in)
- Position: Forward

Youth career
- 1997–1999: Hosho High School

Senior career*
Years	Team	Apps	(Gls)
2000–2007	Gamba Osaka	86	(10)
2005	→ Nagoya Grampus Eight (loan)	14	(0)
2008–2009	Roasso Kumamoto	56	(9)
2010	Mito HollyHock	17	(1)
2011–2013	V-Varen Nagasaki	48	(14)
2013–2015	FC Ryukyu	76	(11)
Total		297	(45)
Medal record
Gamba Osaka
Winner	J1 League	2005
Winner	J.League Cup	2007
Runner-up	J.League Cup	2005
Runner-up	Emperor's Cup	2006
Representing Japan
Asian Games
Silver medal – second place	2002 Busan	Team
- * Club domestic league appearances and goals

Satoshi Nakayama (中山 悟志, Nakayama Satoshi; born November 7, 1981) is a former Japanese football player.

== Playing career ==
Nakayama was born in Miyazaki on November 7, 1981. After graduating from high school, he joined J1 League club Gamba Osaka in 2000. Although he played many matches as substitute forward form 2004, he could not become a regular player. In June 2005, he moved to J1 club Nagoya Grampus Eight on loan and played many matches. In 2006, he returned to Gamba Osaka. Although he played many matches as substitute forward in 2006, he could hardly play in the match in 2007. In 2008, he moved to J2 League club Roasso Kumamoto. He played many matches as regular player in 2008. However his opportunity to play decreased in 2009 and left the club end of 2009 season. In May 2010, he joined J2 club Mito HollyHock and played many matches as substitute forward. In 2011, he moved to Japan Football League (JFL) club V-Varen Nagasaki. He became a regular player and scored 11 goals in 2012. The club also won the champions and was promoted to J2 from 2013. However he could not play at all in the match in 2013. In August 2013, he moved to JFL club FC Ryukyu. He played many matches and the club was promoted to new league J3 League from 2014. He played many matches as regular player until 2015 and retired end of 2015 season.

== Career statistics ==
Appearances and goals by club, season and competition
Club	Season	League			Emperor's Cup		J.League Cup		Asia		Total	
Club	Season	Division	Apps	Goals	Apps	Goals	Apps	Goals	Apps	Goals	Apps	Goals
Gamba Osaka	2000	J1 League	0	0	1	0	0	0	—		1	0
Gamba Osaka	2001	J1 League	3	0	0	0	0	0	—		3	0
Gamba Osaka	2002	J1 League	12	2	2	0	0	0	—		14	2
Gamba Osaka	2003	J1 League	22	3	1	0	4	1	—		27	4
Gamba Osaka	2004	J1 League	22	3	2	0	5	1	—		29	4
Gamba Osaka	2005	J1 League	0	0	0	0	0	0	—		0	0
Nagoya Grampus Eight	2005	J1 League	14	0	2	2	0	0	—		16	2
Gamba Osaka	2006	J1 League	22	2	1	0	1	0	3	0	27	2
Gamba Osaka	2007	J1 League	5	0	0	0	3	0	—		8	0
Roasso Kumamoto	2008	J2 League	36	5	0	0	—		—		36	5
Roasso Kumamoto	2009	J2 League	20	4	1	0	—		—		21	4
Mito HollyHock	2010	J2 League	17	1	1	0	—		—		18	1
V-Varen Nagasaki	2011	Football League	18	3	0	0	—		—		18	3
V-Varen Nagasaki	2012	Football League	30	11	1	0	—		—		31	11
V-Varen Nagasaki	2013	J2 League	0	0	0	0	—		—		0	0
FC Ryukyu	2013	Football League	9	0	2	2	—		—		11	2
FC Ryukyu	2014	J3 League	32	5	2	0	—		—		34	5
FC Ryukyu	2015	J3 League	35	6	2	0	—		—		37	6
Career total			297	45	16	2	15	4	3	0	331	51

== Honours ==
- Asian Games Top Scorer : 2002
- Toulon Tournament Top Scorer: 2002
