= Yusuke Kobayashi (footballer, born 1983) =

Japanese footballer

Personal information
- Full name: Yusuke Kobayashi
- Date of birth: October 16, 1983 (age 43)
- Place of birth: Hiroshima, Japan
- Height: 1.65 m (5 ft 5 in)
- Position: Midfielder

Youth career
- 2002–2005: Chuo University

Senior career*
Years	Team	Apps	(Gls)
2006–2007	NEC Tokin		
2008–2011	Fagiano Okayama	104	(8)
Total		104	(8)
- * Club domestic league appearances and goals

Yusuke Kobayashi (小林 優希, Kobayashi Yusuke; born October 16, 1983) is a former Japanese football player.

== Club statistics ==
Club performance			League		Cup		Total	
Season	Club	League	Apps	Goals	Apps	Goals	Apps	Goals
Japan			League		Emperor's Cup		Total	
2008	Fagiano Okayama	Football League	15	2	1	0	16	2
2009	Fagiano Okayama	J2 League	43	2	1	0	44	2
2010	Fagiano Okayama	J2 League	27	1	0	0	27	1
2011	Fagiano Okayama	J2 League	19	3	1	0	20	3
Country	Japan		104	8	3	0	107	8
Total			104	8	3	0	107	8
