= Yuki Nagahata =

Japanese footballer

Yuki Nagahata 永畑 祐樹
Personal information
- Full name: Yuki Nagahata
- Date of birth: May 2, 1989 (age 37)
- Place of birth: Izumi, Kagoshima, Japan
- Height: 1.65 m (5 ft 5 in)
- Position: Midfielder

Youth career
- 2005–2008: Kamimura Gakuen High School

Senior career*
Years	Team	Apps	(Gls)
2008–2010	Shimizu S-Pulse	0	(0)
2011–2012	Giravanz Kitakyushu	3	(0)
2013	Volca Kagoshima	13	(9)
2014–2019	Kagoshima United FC	94	(9)
Medal record
Shimizu S-Pulse
Runner-up	J.League Cup	2008
Runner-up	Emperor's Cup	2010
- * Club domestic league appearances and goals

Yuki Nagahata (永畑 祐樹, Nagahata Yūki; born May 2, 1989) is a Japanese retired football player.

== Career ==
After being a key-player for Kagoshima United FC, Nagahata retired in December 2019.

== Club statistics ==
Updated to 5 April 2020.

Club performance			League		Cup		League Cup		Total	
Season	Club	League	Apps	Goals	Apps	Goals	Apps	Goals	Apps	Goals
Japan			League		Emperor's Cup		J. League Cup		Total	
2008	Shimizu S-Pulse	J1 League	0	0	0	0	0	0	0	0
2009	Shimizu S-Pulse	J1 League	0	0	0	0	0	0	0	0
2010	Shimizu S-Pulse	J1 League	0	0	0	0	0	0	0	0
2011	Giravanz Kitakyushu	J2 League	2	0	1	0	–		3	0
2012	Giravanz Kitakyushu	J2 League	1	0	0	0	–		1	0
2013	Volca Kagoshima	JRL (Kyushu)	13	9	–		–		13	9
2014	Kagoshima United FC	JFL	0	0	0	0	–		0	0
2015	Kagoshima United FC	JFL	6	0	0	0	–		6	0
2016	Kagoshima United FC	J3 League	27	1	1	0	–		28	1
2017	Kagoshima United FC	J3 League	29	5	2	0	–		31	5
2018	Kagoshima United FC	J3 League	30	3	1	0	–		31	3
2019	Kagoshima United FC	J2 League	1	0	1	1	–		2	1
Total			109	18	6	1	0	0	115	19
