= Sho Murata =

Japanese footballer

Personal information
- Full name: Sho Murata
- Date of birth: April 2, 1987 (age 39)
- Place of birth: Nerima, Tokyo, Japan
- Height: 1.78 m (5 ft 10 in)
- Position: Midfielder

Team information
- Current team: Thespakusatsu Gunma
- Number: 22

Youth career
- 2003–2005: FC Tokyo
- 2006–2009: Chuo University

Senior career*
| Years | Team | Apps | (Gls) |
| 2010–2012 | Mito HollyHock | 74 | (1) |
| 2013–2016 | Briobecca Urayasu | 84 | (10) |
| 2017– | Thespakusatsu Gunma | | |
| Total | | 158 | (11) |
- * Club domestic league appearances and goals as of 23 February 2017

Sho Murata (村田 翔, Murata Shō; born April 2, 1987) is a Japanese football player. He is currently playing for Thespakusatsu Gunma.

== Career statistics ==
Updated to 23 February 2017.

Appearances and goals by club, season and competition
| Club | Season | League | | | Emperor's Cup | | J.League Cup | | Total | |
| Club | Season | Division | Apps | Goals | Apps | Goals | Apps | Goals | Apps | Goals |
|---|---|---|---|---|---|---|---|---|---|---|
| Mito HollyHock | 2010 | J2 League | 29 | 0 | 2 | 0 | — | | 31 | 0 |
| Mito HollyHock | 2011 | J2 League | 35 | 1 | 2 | 0 | — | | 37 | 1 |
| Mito HollyHock | 2012 | J2 League | 10 | 0 | 0 | 0 | — | | 10 | 0 |
| Briobecca Urayasu | 2013 | JRL (Kanto) | 18 | 5 | 1 | 0 | — | | 19 | 5 |
| Briobecca Urayasu | 2014 | JRL (Kanto) | 18 | 2 | 2 | 0 | — | | 20 | 2 |
| Briobecca Urayasu | 2015 | JRL (Kanto) | 18 | 3 | – | | — | | 18 | 3 |
| Briobecca Urayasu | 2016 | JFL | 30 | 0 | – | | — | | 30 | 0 |
| Career total | | | 158 | 11 | 7 | 0 | 0 | 0 | 165 | 11 |
