= Yasunobu Matsuoka =

Japanese footballer

Personal information
- Full name: Yasunobu Matsuoka
- Date of birth: May 2, 1986 (age 40)
- Place of birth: Neyagawa, Osaka, Japan
- Height: 1.68 m (5 ft 6 in)
- Position: Midfielder

Youth career
- 2002–2004: Gamba Osaka

Senior career*
Years	Team	Apps	(Gls)
2005–2006	Gamba Osaka	0	(0)
2006–2010	Roasso Kumamoto	42	(0)
2011–2012	V-Varen Nagasaki	3	(0)
Total		45	(0)
Medal record
Gamba Osaka
Winner	J1 League	2005
Runner-up	J.League Cup	2005
Runner-up	Emperor's Cup	2006
- * Club domestic league appearances and goals

Yasunobu Matsuoka (松岡 康暢, Matsuoka Yasunobu; born May 2, 1986) is a former Japanese football player.

== Club statistics ==
Club performance			League		Cup		League Cup		Total	
Season	Club	League	Apps	Goals	Apps	Goals	Apps	Goals	Apps	Goals
Japan			League		Emperor's Cup		League Cup		Total	
2005	Gamba Osaka	J1 League	0	0	0	0	0	0	0	0
2006	Gamba Osaka	J1 League	0	0	-		0	0	0	0
2006	Rosso Kumamoto	Football League	5	0	0	0	-		5	0
2007	Rosso Kumamoto	Football League	14	0	0	0	-		14	0
2008	Roasso Kumamoto	J2 League	8	0	0	0	-		8	0
2009	Roasso Kumamoto	J2 League	15	0	1	0	-		16	0
2010	Roasso Kumamoto	J2 League					-			
Career total			42	0	1	0	0	0	43	0
