= Shota Otsuka =

Japanese footballer

Personal information
- Full name: Shota Otsuka
- Date of birth: May 15, 1987 (age 39)
- Place of birth: Kumamoto, Japan
- Height: 1.65 m (5 ft 5 in)
- Position: Midfielder

Youth career
- 2006–2009: University of Tsukuba

Senior career*
Years	Team	Apps	(Gls)
2010–2011	Mito HollyHock	15	(0)
Total		15	(0)
- * Club domestic league appearances and goals

Shota Otsuka (大塚 翔太, Ōtsuka Shōta; born May 15, 1987) is a former Japanese football player.

== Club statistics ==
Club performance			League		Cup		League Cup		Total	
Season	Club	League	Apps	Goals	Apps	Goals	Apps	Goals	Apps	Goals
Japan			League		Emperor's Cup		League Cup		Total	
2010	Mito HollyHock	J2 League	15	0	0	0	-		15	0
2011	Mito HollyHock	J2 League					-			
Career total			15	0	0	0	0	0	15	0
