= 2014 FC Ryukyu season =

FC Ryukyu
2014 season
- Manager: Norihiro Satsukawa
- Stadium: Okinawa Athletic Park Stadium
- J3 League: 9th
Home colours	Away colours

2014 FC Ryukyu season.

== J3 League ==
Match	Date	Team	Score	Team	Venue	Attendance
1	2014.03.09	FC Ryukyu	3-0	J.League U-22 Selection	Okinawa Athletic Park Stadium	1,517
2	2014.03.16	FC Ryukyu	2-0	Blaublitz Akita	Okinawa Athletic Park Stadium	935
3	2014.03.23	Fujieda MYFC	2-2	FC Ryukyu	Fujieda Soccer Stadium	856
4	2014.03.30	FC Ryukyu	0-1	Grulla Morioka	Okinawa Athletic Park Stadium	863
6	2014.04.13	FC Ryukyu	0-0	SC Sagamihara	Okinawa City Stadium	1,021
5	2014.04.16	Zweigen Kanazawa	2-1	FC Ryukyu	Ishikawa Athletics Stadium	1,113
7	2014.04.20	FC Ryukyu	1-7	FC Machida Zelvia	Okinawa City Stadium	856
8	2014.04.26	AC Nagano Parceiro	1-0	FC Ryukyu	Saku Athletic Stadium	1,803
9	2014.04.29	YSCC Yokohama	1-4	FC Ryukyu	NHK Spring Mitsuzawa Football Stadium	848
10	2014.05.04	FC Ryukyu	1-3	Fukushima United FC	Okinawa City Stadium	935
11	2014.05.11	Gainare Tottori	0-0	FC Ryukyu	Tottori Bank Bird Stadium	2,100
12	2014.05.18	FC Ryukyu	1-0	Zweigen Kanazawa	Okinawa City Stadium	575
13	2014.05.25	FC Ryukyu	0-2	AC Nagano Parceiro	Okinawa City Stadium	864
14	2014.06.01	SC Sagamihara	4-0	FC Ryukyu	Sagamihara Gion Stadium	2,755
15	2014.06.08	FC Ryukyu	0-6	J.League U-22 Selection	Okinawa City Stadium	4,362
16	2014.06.15	Fujieda MYFC	1-0	FC Ryukyu	Fujieda Soccer Stadium	612
17	2014.06.22	FC Ryukyu	2-0	Blaublitz Akita	Okinawa City Stadium	732
18	2014.07.20	Fukushima United FC	2-2	FC Ryukyu	Aizu Athletic Park Stadium	1,518
19	2014.07.27	FC Ryukyu	0-3	Gainare Tottori	Okinawa City Stadium	851
20	2014.08.03	Grulla Morioka	2-1	FC Ryukyu	Morioka Minami Park Stadium	741
21	2014.08.10	FC Ryukyu	1-1	YSCC Yokohama	Okinawa City Stadium	1,318
22	2014.08.24	FC Machida Zelvia	0-1	FC Ryukyu	Machida Stadium	2,553
23	2014.08.31	Blaublitz Akita	0-1	FC Ryukyu	Akita Yabase Playing Field	1,281
24	2014.09.07	FC Ryukyu	0-0	Fujieda MYFC	Okinawa City Stadium	1,004
25	2014.09.14	FC Ryukyu	0-0	Gainare Tottori	Okinawa City Stadium	1,053
26	2014.09.21	FC Ryukyu	0-1	AC Nagano Parceiro	Okinawa City Stadium	1,031
27	2014.10.05	SC Sagamihara	1-1	FC Ryukyu	Sagamihara Gion Stadium	921
29	2014.10.18	YSCC Yokohama	0-0	FC Ryukyu	NHK Spring Mitsuzawa Football Stadium	638
28	2014.10.25	FC Ryukyu	1-1	Grulla Morioka	Okinawa City Stadium	520
30	2014.11.02	FC Ryukyu	4-2	J.League U-22 Selection	Okinawa City Stadium	5,163
31	2014.11.09	FC Machida Zelvia	4-1	FC Ryukyu	Machida Stadium	2,950
32	2014.11.16	FC Ryukyu	0-1	Zweigen Kanazawa	Okinawa City Stadium	1,562
33	2014.11.23	Fukushima United FC	2-1	FC Ryukyu	Toho Stadium	1,929
