= Daisuke Tada =

Japanese footballer (born 1982)

Daisuke Tada 多田 大介
Personal information
- Full name: Daisuke Tada
- Date of birth: August 11, 1982 (age 44)
- Place of birth: Okayama, Japan
- Height: 1.85 m (6 ft 1 in)
- Position: Goalkeeper

Youth career
- 1998–2000: Tokai University Daigo High School

Senior career*
Years	Team	Apps	(Gls)
2001–2007	Cerezo Osaka	21	(0)
2008	Ehime FC	21	(0)
2009	Cerezo Osaka	2	(0)
2010	Omiya Ardija	0	(0)
2011	Gainare Tottori	0	(0)
2012	FC Gifu	15	(0)
2013	Cerezo Osaka	0	(0)
2014	Sriracha		
Total		59	(0)
Medal record
Cerezo Osaka
Runner-up	Emperor's Cup	2001
Runner-up	Emperor's Cup	2003
- * Club domestic league appearances and goals

Daisuke Tada (多田 大介, Tada Daisuke; born August 11, 1982) is a former Japanese football player.

== Playing career ==
Tada was born in Okayama Prefecture on August 11, 1982. After graduating from high school, he joined Cerezo Osaka in 2001. He could not play at all in the match behind Seigo Shimokawa until 2002. In July 2003, he became a regular goalkeeper instead Shimokawa and played all 19 matches until end of 2003 season. Although he played first 2 matches in 2004 season, Cerezo lost both matches and he lost his position. After that, he could hardly play in the match until 2007. In 2008, he moved to Ehime FC. He battles with Yusuke Kawakita for the position and played 21 matches. In 2009, he re-joined Cerezo Osaka. However he could hardly play in the match behind Kim Jin-hyeon. He moved to Omiya Ardija in 2010 and Gainare Tottori in 2011. However he could not play at all in the match both clubs. In 2012, he moved to FC Gifu and became a regular goalkeeper. However he lost his position behind Shogo Tokihisa in June and he left the club end of the season. In April 2013, he re-joined Cerezo Osaka. However he could not play at all in the match. In 2014, he moved to Thailand and joined Sriracha. He retired end of 2014 season.

== Club statistics ==
Club performance			League		Cup		League Cup		Total	
Season	Club	League	Apps	Goals	Apps	Goals	Apps	Goals	Apps	Goals
Japan			League		Emperor's Cup		J.League Cup		Total	
2001	Cerezo Osaka	J1 League	0	0	0	0	0	0	0	0
2002	Cerezo Osaka	J2 League	0	0	0	0	-		0	0
2003	Cerezo Osaka	J1 League	19	0	0	0	1	0	20	0
2004	Cerezo Osaka	J1 League	2	0	0	0	0	0	2	0
2005	Cerezo Osaka	J1 League	0	0	0	0	0	0	0	0
2006	Cerezo Osaka	J1 League	0	0	1	0	1	0	2	0
2007	Cerezo Osaka	J2 League	0	0	0	0	-		0	0
Total			21	0	1	0	2	0	24	0
2008	Ehime FC	J2 League	21	0	0	0	-		21	0
Total			21	0	0	0	-		21	0
2009	Cerezo Osaka	J2 League	2	0	0	0	-		2	0
Total			2	0	0	0	-		2	0
2010	Omiya Ardija	J1 League	0	0	0	0	0	0	0	0
Total			0	0	0	0	0	0	0	0
2011	Gainare Tottori	J2 League	0	0	0	0	-		0	0
Total			0	0	0	0	-		0	0
2012	FC Gifu	J2 League	15	0	0	0	-		15	0
Total			15	0	0	0	-		15	0
2013	Cerezo Osaka	J1 League	0	0	0	0	0	0	0	0
Total			0	0	0	0	0	0	0	0
Career total			59	0	1	0	2	0	62	0
