= Masashi Owada =

Japanese footballer

Masashi Owada 大和田 真史
Personal information
- Full name: Masashi Owada
- Date of birth: July 28, 1981 (age 45)
- Place of birth: Takahagi, Ibaraki, Japan
- Height: 1.88 m (6 ft 2 in)
- Position: Defender

Youth career
- 1997–1999: Kashima Antlers
- 2000–2003: Meiji University

Senior career*
| Years | Team | Apps | (Gls) |
| 2004–2010 | Mito HollyHock | 197 | (13) |
| 2011–2013 | Tochigi SC | 58 | (1) |
| Total | | 255 | (14) |
- * Club domestic league appearances and goals

Masashi Owada (大和田 真史, Owada Masashi; born July 28, 1981) is a former Japanese football player. he is the current first-team coach J2 League club of JEF United Chiba.

== Career statistics ==
Appearances and goals by club, season and competition
| Club | Season | League | | | Emperor's Cup | | Total | |
| Club | Season | Division | Apps | Goals | Apps | Goals | Apps | Goals |
|---|---|---|---|---|---|---|---|---|
| Mito HollyHock | 2004 | J2 League | 4 | 0 | 0 | 0 | 4 | 0 |
| Mito HollyHock | 2005 | J2 League | 36 | 3 | 2 | 0 | 38 | 3 |
| Mito HollyHock | 2006 | J2 League | 38 | 2 | 1 | 0 | 39 | 2 |
| Mito HollyHock | 2007 | J2 League | 14 | 1 | 0 | 0 | 14 | 1 |
| Mito HollyHock | 2008 | J2 League | 29 | 2 | 2 | 0 | 31 | 2 |
| Mito HollyHock | 2009 | J2 League | 44 | 2 | 1 | 0 | 45 | 2 |
| Mito HollyHock | 2010 | J2 League | 32 | 3 | 2 | 1 | 34 | 4 |
| Tochigi SC | 2011 | J2 League | | | | | | |
| Career total | | | 197 | 13 | 8 | 1 | 205 | 14 |
