= Yusuke Nakamura (footballer) =

Japanese footballer

Personal information
- Full name: Yusuke Nakamura
- Date of birth: October 6, 1986 (age 40)
- Place of birth: Shizuoka, Japan
- Height: 1.53 m (5 ft 0 in)
- Position: Midfielder

Senior career*
Years	Team	Apps	(Gls)
2005–2007	Vissel Kobe	1	(0)
2008–2010	FC Ryukyu	80	(6)
Total		81	(6)
- * Club domestic league appearances and goals

Yusuke Nakamura (中村 友亮, Nakamura Yūsuke; born October 6, 1986) is a former Japanese football player.

== Club statistics ==
Club performance			League		Cup		League Cup		Total	
Season	Club	League	Apps	Goals	Apps	Goals	Apps	Goals	Apps	Goals
Japan			League		Emperor's Cup		J.League Cup		Total	
2005	Vissel Kobe	J1 League	1	0	0	0	0	0	1	0
2006	Vissel Kobe	J2 League	0	0	1	0	-		1	0
2007	Vissel Kobe	J1 League	0	0	0	0	0	0	0	0
2008	FC Ryukyu	Football League	21	1	-		-		21	1
2009	FC Ryukyu	Football League	32	2	-		-		32	2
2010	FC Ryukyu	Football League								
Country	Japan		54	3	1	0	0	0	55	3
Total			54	3	1	0	0	0	55	3
