= Yuji Sakuda =

Japanese footballer

Yuji Sakuda 作田 裕次
Personal information
- Full name: Yuji Sakuda
- Date of birth: December 4, 1987 (age 38)
- Place of birth: Ishikawa, Japan
- Height: 1.83 m (6 ft 0 in)
- Position: Defender

Team information
- Current team: Zweigen Kanazawa
- Number: 3

Youth career
- 2003–2005: Seiryō High School
- 2006–2009: Tsukuba University

Senior career*
Years	Team	Apps	(Gls)
2010	Mito HollyHock	36	(2)
2011–2012	Oita Trinita	40	(2)
2013	Montedio Yamagata	15	(0)
2014–	Zweigen Kanazawa	165	(10)
- * Club domestic league appearances and goals as of 1 January 2019

Yuji Sakuda (作田 裕次, Sakuda Yūji; born December 4, 1987 in Ishikawa) is a Japanese football player currently playing for Zweigen Kanazawa.

== Club statistics ==
Updated to end of 2018 season.

Club performance			League		Cup		Total	
Season	Club	League	Apps	Goals	Apps	Goals	Apps	Goals
Japan			League		Emperor's Cup		Total	
2010	Mito Hollyhock	J2 League	36	2	2	0	38	2
2011	Oita Trinita	J2 League	17	1	1	1	18	2
2012	Oita Trinita	J2 League	23	1	1	0	24	1
2013	Montedio Yamagata	J2 League	15	0	0	0	15	0
2014	Zweigen Kanazawa	J3 League	33	2	2	0	35	2
2015	Zweigen Kanazawa	J2 League	40	5	1	1	41	6
2016	Zweigen Kanazawa	J2 League	32	2	0	0	32	2
2017	Zweigen Kanazawa	J2 League	34	0	2	0	36	0
2018	Zweigen Kanazawa	J2 League	26	1	1	0	27	1
Total			256	14	10	2	266	16
