= Yohei Nakada =

Japanese footballer

Personal information
- Full name: Yohei Nakada
- Date of birth: November 11, 1983 (age 43)
- Place of birth: Hyogo, Japan
- Height: 1.74 m (5 ft 8 1/2 in)
- Position: Defender

Youth career
- 2002–2005: Kochi University

Senior career*
Years	Team	Apps	(Gls)
2006–2010	Kataller Toyama	100	(5)
2011	Toyama Shinjo Club	4	(2)
Total		104	(7)
- * Club domestic league appearances and goals

Yohei Nakada (中田 洋平, Nakada Yohei; born November 11, 1983) is a former Japanese football player.

== Club statistics ==
Club performance			League		Cup		Total	
Season	Club	League	Apps	Goals	Apps	Goals	Apps	Goals
Japan			League		Emperor's Cup		Total	
2006	YKK AP	Football League	17	2	3	0	20	2
2007	YKK AP	Football League	10	0	-		10	0
2008	Kataller Toyama	Football League	30	2	2	0	32	2
2009	Kataller Toyama	J2 League	30	1	2	0	32	1
2010	Kataller Toyama	J2 League	13	0	0	0	13	0
Country	Japan		100	5	7	0	107	5
Total			100	5	7	0	107	5
