= Masaaki Nishimori =

Japanese footballer

Personal information
- Full name: Masaaki Nishimori
- Date of birth: March 12, 1985 (age 41)
- Place of birth: Kumamoto, Kumamoto, Japan
- Height: 1.68 m (5 ft 6 in)
- Position: Midfielder

Youth career
- 2003–2006: Ryutsu Keizai University

Senior career*
Years	Team	Apps	(Gls)
2007–2012	Roasso Kumamoto	100	(4)
2013	FC Kagoshima	0	(0)
2013–2014	V-Varen Nagasaki	1	(0)
2014	Renofa Yamaguchi FC	9	(2)
Total		110	(6)
- * Club domestic league appearances and goals

Masaaki Nishimori (西森 正明, Nishimori Masaaki; born March 12, 1985) is a Japanese former football player.

== Club statistics ==
Club performance			League		Cup		Total	
Season	Club	League	Apps	Goals	Apps	Goals	Apps	Goals
Japan			League		Emperor's Cup		Total	
2005	Ryutsu Keizai University	Football League	5	0	0	0	5	0
2006	Ryutsu Keizai University	Football League	11	1	1	0	12	1
2007	Rosso Kumamoto	Football League	22	1	1	0	23	1
2008	Roasso Kumamoto	J2 League	13	0	0	0	13	0
2009	Roasso Kumamoto	J2 League	18	1	1	1	19	2
2010	Roasso Kumamoto	J2 League	19	0	1	0	20	0
2011	Roasso Kumamoto	J2 League						
Country	Japan		88	3	4	1	92	4
Total			88	3	4	1	92	4
