= Hideyuki Nakamura =

Japanese footballer

Personal information
- Full name: Hideyuki Nakamura
- Date of birth: June 3, 1984 (age 42)
- Place of birth: Saitama, Japan
- Height: 1.86 m (6 ft 1 in)
- Position: Defender

Youth career
- 2003–2006: Juntendo University

Senior career*
Years	Team	Apps	(Gls)
2007–2010	Mito HollyHock	83	(5)
2011–2013	Thespakusatsu Gunma	71	(5)
2014	FC Gifu	10	(0)
2015	Montedio Yamagata	0	(0)
Total		164	(10)
- * Club domestic league appearances and goals

Hideyuki Nakamura (中村 英之, Nakamura Hideyuki; born June 3, 1984) is a former Japanese football player.

== Career statistics ==
Appearances and goals by club, season and competition
Club	Season	League			Emperor's Cup		J.League Cup		Total	
Club	Season	Division	Apps	Goals	Apps	Goals	Apps	Goals	Apps	Goals
Mito HollyHock	2007	J2 League	14	1	2	0	—		16	1
Mito HollyHock	2008	J2 League	24	1	1	0	—		25	1
Mito HollyHock	2009	J2 League	27	3	1	0	—		28	3
Mito HollyHock	2010	J2 League	18	0	0	0	—		18	0
Thespa Kusatsu	2011	J2 League	26	3	0	0	—		26	3
Thespa Kusatsu	2012	J2 League	30	2	1	0	—		31	2
Thespakusatsu Gunma	2013	J2 League	15	0	1	0	—		16	0
FC Gifu	2014	J2 League	10	0	0	0	—		10	0
Montedio Yamagata	2015	J1 League	0	0	1	0	1	0	2	0
Career total			164	10	7	0	1	0	172	10
