= Kazuya Nagayama =

Japanese footballer

Personal information
- Full name: Kazuya Nagayama
- Date of birth: April 1, 1982 (age 44)
- Place of birth: Kagoshima, Japan
- Height: 1.65 m (5 ft 5 in)
- Position: Midfielder

Youth career
- 2000–2003: Hosei University

Senior career*
Years	Team	Apps	(Gls)
2004	Shizuoka FC		
2005–2010	Kataller Toyama	138	(1)
Total		138	(1)
- * Club domestic league appearances and goals

Kazuya Nagayama (長山 一也, Nagayama Kazuya; born April 1, 1982) is a former Japanese football player.

== Club statistics ==
Club performance			League		Cup		Total	
Season	Club	League	Apps	Goals	Apps	Goals	Apps	Goals
Japan			League		Emperor's Cup		Total	
2005	ALO'S Hokuriku	Football League	15	0	3	0	18	0
2006	ALO'S Hokuriku	Football League	21	0	-		21	0
2007	ALO'S Hokuriku	Football League	18	0	2	0	20	0
2008	Kataller Toyama	Football League	17	0	1	0	18	0
2009	Kataller Toyama	J2 League	48	1	2	0	50	1
2010	Kataller Toyama	J2 League	19	0	1	0	20	0
Country	Japan		138	1	9	0	147	1
Total			138	1	9	0	147	1
