= 2008 Oita Trinita season =

Oita Trinita
2008 season
- Manager: Chamusca
- Stadium: Kyushu Oil Dome
- J. League 1: 4th
- Emperor's Cup: 4th Round
- J. League Cup: Champions
- Top goalscorer: Ueslei (7)

2008 Oita Trinita season

== Competitions ==
Competitions	Position
J. League 1	4th / 18 clubs
Emperor's Cup	4th Round
J. League Cup	Champions

== Domestic results ==
=== J. League 1 ===
Match	Date	Venue	Opponents	Score
1	2008..			-
2	2008..			-
3	2008..			-
4	2008..			-
5	2008..			-
6	2008..			-
7	2008..			-
8	2008..			-
9	2008..			-
10	2008..			-
11	2008..			-
12	2008..			-
13	2008..			-
14	2008..			-
15	2008..			-
16	2008..			-
17	2008..			-
18	2008..			-
19	2008..			-
20	2008..			-
21	2008..			-
22	2008..			-
23	2008..			-
24	2008..			-
25	2008..			-
26	2008..			-
27	2008..			-
28	2008..			-
29	2008..			-
30	2008..			-
31	2008..			-
32	2008..			-
33	2008..			-
34	2008..			-

=== Emperor's Cup ===
Match	Date	Venue	Opponents	Score
4th Round	2008..			-

=== J. League Cup ===
Match	Date	Venue	Opponents	Score
GL-D-1	2008..			-
GL-D-2	2008..			-
GL-D-3	2008..			-
GL-D-4	2008..			-
GL-D-5	2008..			-
GL-D-6	2008..			-
Quarterfinals-1	2008..			-
Quarterfinals-2	2008..			-
Semifinals-1	2008..			-
Semifinals-2	2008..			-
Final	2008..			-

== Player statistics ==
No.	Pos.	Player	D.o.B. (Age)	Height / Weight	J. League 1		Emperor's Cup		J. League Cup		Total	
No.	Pos.	Player	D.o.B. (Age)	Height / Weight	Apps	Goals	Apps	Goals	Apps	Goals	Apps	Goals
1	GK	Shusaku Nishikawa	June 18, 1986 (aged 21)	cm / kg	22	0						
2	DF	Ryo Kobayashi	September 12, 1982 (aged 25)	cm / kg	18	1						
3	MF	Roberto	February 20, 1979 (aged 29)	cm / kg	29	1						
4	DF	Yuki Fukaya	August 1, 1982 (aged 25)	cm / kg	32	1						
5	MF	Edmilson Alves	February 17, 1976 (aged 32)	cm / kg	33	4						
6	DF	Masato Morishige	May 21, 1987 (aged 20)	cm / kg	28	3						
7	MF	Teppei Nishiyama	February 22, 1975 (aged 33)	cm / kg	11	0						
8	MF	Mu Kanazaki	February 16, 1989 (aged 19)	cm / kg	34	4						
9	FW	Yasuhito Morishima	September 18, 1987 (aged 20)	cm / kg	15	2						
10	FW	Ueslei	April 19, 1972 (aged 35)	cm / kg	30	7						
11	MF	Shingo Suzuki	March 20, 1978 (aged 29)	cm / kg	34	2						
13	FW	Daiki Takamatsu	September 8, 1981 (aged 26)	cm / kg	16	0						
14	MF	Akihiro Ienaga	June 13, 1986 (aged 21)	cm / kg	4	0						
16	GK	Seigo Shimokawa	November 17, 1975 (aged 32)	cm / kg	13	0						
17	DF	Yuichi Nemoto	July 21, 1981 (aged 26)	cm / kg	5	0						
18	FW	Hiroshi Ichihara	April 24, 1987 (aged 20)	cm / kg	6	0						
19	FW	Shunsuke Maeda	June 9, 1986 (aged 21)	cm / kg	15	2						
20	MF	Daisuke Takahashi	September 18, 1983 (aged 24)	cm / kg	21	1						
21	FW	Masaru Matsuhashi	March 22, 1985 (aged 22)	cm / kg	13	1						
22	DF	Taikai Uemoto	June 1, 1982 (aged 25)	cm / kg	31	2						
23	GK	Ryosuke Ishida	July 4, 1989 (aged 18)	cm / kg	0	0						
24	DF	Tetsuya Yamazaki	July 25, 1978 (aged 29)	cm / kg	4	0						
25	DF	Hiroyuki Kobayashi	April 18, 1980 (aged 27)	cm / kg	13	0						
26	DF	Tatsuya Ikeda	May 18, 1988 (aged 19)	cm / kg	0	0						
27	MF	Koki Kotegawa	September 12, 1989 (aged 18)	cm / kg	1	0						
28	MF	Hiroshi Kiyotake	November 12, 1989 (aged 18)	cm / kg	8	1						
29	GK	Keisuke Shimizu	November 25, 1988 (aged 19)	cm / kg	0	0						
30	MF	Yudai Inoue	May 30, 1989 (aged 18)	cm / kg	0	0						
33	DF	Yoshiaki Fujita	January 12, 1983 (aged 25)	cm / kg	26	0						

== Other pages ==
- (in Japanese) J. League official site
