= 2008 J.League Cup final =

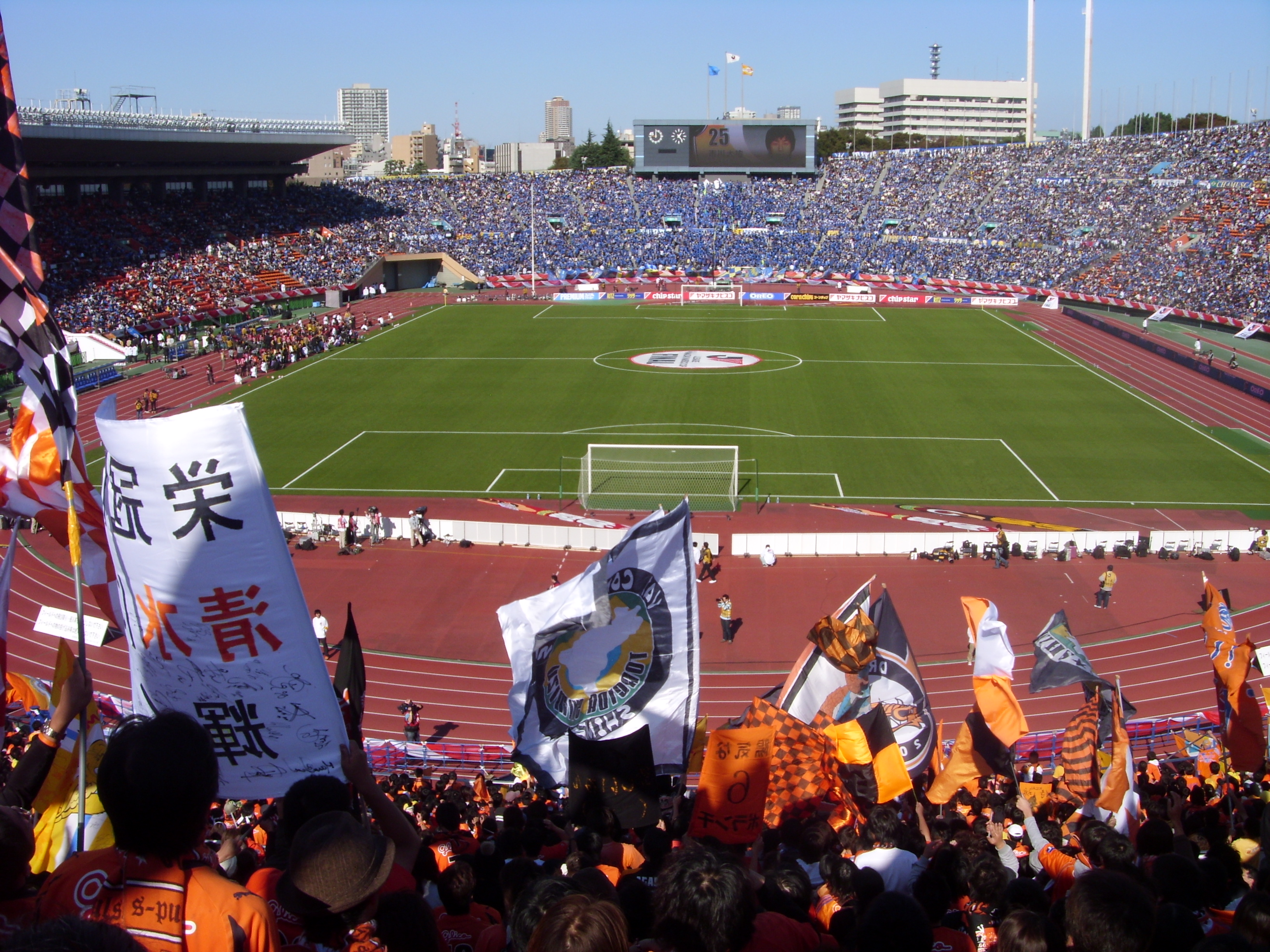
Oita Trinita	Shimizu S-Pulse
2	0
- Date: November 1, 2008
- Venue: National Stadium, Tokyo

2008 J.League Cup final was the 16th final of the J.League Cup competition. The final was played at National Stadium in Tokyo on November 1, 2008. Oita Trinita won the championship.

== Match details ==
November 1, 2008

Oita Trinita	2–0	Shimizu S-Pulse
Daiki Takamatsu 68'; Ueslei 89'	Report

National Stadium

Oita Trinita
GK	16	(Japan) Seigo Shimokawa
DF	4	(Japan) Yuki Fukaya
DF	6	(Japan) Masato Morishige
DF	22	(Japan) Taikai Uemoto
MF	3	(Brazil) Roberto
MF	5	(Brazil) Edmilson
MF	8	(Japan) Mu Kanazaki	(substituted off) 89'
MF	20	(Japan) Daisuke Takahashi
MF	33	(Japan) Yoshiaki Fujita	(substituted off) 89'
FW	10	(Brazil) Ueslei
FW	13	(Japan) Daiki Takamatsu	(substituted off) 82'
Substitutes:
GK	29	(Japan) Keisuke Shimizu
DF	25	(Japan) Hiroyuki Kobayashi	(substituted on) 89'
MF	2	(Japan) Ryo Kobayashi
MF	7	(Japan) Teppei Nishiyama	(substituted on) 89'
MF	14	(Japan) Akihiro Ienaga
MF	28	(Japan) Hiroshi Kiyotake
FW	9	(Japan) Yasuhito Morishima	(substituted on) 82'
Manager:
(Brazil) Chamusca

Shimizu S-Pulse
GK	29	(Japan) Kaito Yamamoto
DF	5	(Japan) Keisuke Iwashita
DF	26	(Japan) Naoaki Aoyama
DF	4	(Japan) Kazumichi Takagi
DF	2	(Japan) Arata Kodama	(substituted off) 71'
MF	28	(Japan) Masaki Yamamoto	(substituted off) 71'
MF	7	(Japan) Teruyoshi Ito
MF	13	(Japan) Akihiro Hyodo
MF	8	(Japan) Takuma Edamura	(substituted off) 82'
FW	19	(Japan) Kazuki Hara
FW	23	(Japan) Shinji Okazaki
Substitutes:
GK	21	(Japan) Yohei Nishibe
DF	3	(Japan) Takahiro Yamanishi
DF	25	(Japan) Daisuke Ichikawa	(substituted on) 71'
MF	16	(Japan) Takuya Honda
MF	6	(Brazil) Marcos Paulo	(substituted on) 71'
FW	11	(Japan) Mitsuhiro Toda
FW	9	(Japan) Takuro Yajima	(substituted on) 82'
Manager:
(Japan) Kenta Hasegawa

== See also ==
- 2008 J.League Cup
