= 2007 Oita Trinita season =

Oita Trinita
2007 season
- Manager: Chamusca
- Stadium: Kyushu Oil Dome
- J. League 1: 14th
- Emperor's Cup: 5th Round
- J. League Cup: GL-C 3rd
- Top goalscorer: Daisuke Takahashi (10)

2007 Oita Trinita season

== Competitions ==
Competitions	Position
J. League 1	14th / 18 clubs
Emperor's Cup	5th Round
J. League Cup	GL-C 3rd / 4 clubs

== Domestic results ==
=== J. League 1 ===
Match	Date	Venue	Opponents	Score
1	2007..			-
2	2007..			-
3	2007..			-
4	2007..			-
5	2007..			-
6	2007..			-
7	2007..			-
8	2007..			-
9	2007..			-
10	2007..			-
11	2007..			-
12	2007..			-
13	2007..			-
14	2007..			-
15	2007..			-
16	2007..			-
17	2007..			-
18	2007..			-
19	2007..			-
20	2007..			-
21	2007..			-
22	2007..			-
23	2007..			-
24	2007..			-
25	2007..			-
26	2007..			-
27	2007..			-
28	2007..			-
29	2007..			-
30	2007..			-
31	2007..			-
32	2007..			-
33	2007..			-
34	2007..			-

=== Emperor's Cup ===
Match	Date	Venue	Opponents	Score
4th Round	2007..			-
5th Round	2007..			-

=== J. League Cup ===
Match	Date	Venue	Opponents	Score
GL-C-1	2007..			-
GL-C-2	2007..			-
GL-C-3	2007..			-
GL-C-4	2007..			-
GL-C-5	2007..			-
GL-C-6	2007..			-

== Player statistics ==
No.	Pos.	Player	D.o.B. (Age)	Height / Weight	J. League 1		Emperor's Cup		J. League Cup		Total	
No.	Pos.	Player	D.o.B. (Age)	Height / Weight	Apps	Goals	Apps	Goals	Apps	Goals	Apps	Goals
1	GK	Shusaku Nishikawa	June 18, 1986 (aged 20)	cm / kg	11	0						
2	DF	Takashi Miki	July 23, 1978 (aged 28)	cm / kg	19	1						
3	DF	Yuichi Shibakoya	June 16, 1983 (aged 23)	cm / kg	0	0						
3	MF	Roberto	February 20, 1979 (aged 28)	cm / kg	11	0						
4	DF	Yuki Fukaya	August 1, 1982 (aged 24)	cm / kg	31	3						
5	MF	Júnior Maranhão	June 17, 1977 (aged 29)	cm / kg	11	0						
5	MF	Edmilson Alves	February 17, 1976 (aged 31)	cm / kg	16	1						
6	MF	Takashi Umeda	May 30, 1976 (aged 30)	cm / kg	11	0						
7	MF	Teppei Nishiyama	February 22, 1975 (aged 32)	cm / kg	19	1						
8	FW	Shota Matsuhashi	August 3, 1982 (aged 24)	cm / kg	24	2						
9	FW	Serginho Baiano	May 1, 1978 (aged 28)	cm / kg	9	1						
10	MF	Augusto	November 20, 1983 (aged 23)	cm / kg	11	2						
11	MF	Shingo Suzuki	March 20, 1978 (aged 28)	cm / kg	15	3						
13	FW	Daiki Takamatsu	September 8, 1981 (aged 25)	cm / kg	30	8						
14	MF	Masashi Miyazawa	April 24, 1978 (aged 28)	cm / kg	6	0						
15	DF	Masato Morishige	May 21, 1987 (aged 19)	cm / kg	20	1						
16	GK	Seigo Shimokawa	November 17, 1975 (aged 31)	cm / kg	23	0						
17	DF	Yuichi Nemoto	July 21, 1981 (aged 25)	cm / kg	20	0						
18	FW	Hiroshi Ichihara	April 24, 1987 (aged 19)	cm / kg	1	0						
19	FW	Shunsuke Maeda	June 9, 1986 (aged 20)	cm / kg	10	1						
20	MF	Daisuke Takahashi	September 18, 1983 (aged 23)	cm / kg	29	10						
21	FW	Masaru Matsuhashi	March 22, 1985 (aged 21)	cm / kg	7	1						
22	DF	Taikai Uemoto	June 1, 1982 (aged 24)	cm / kg	29	0						
23	GK	Masaharu Kawahara	May 30, 1984 (aged 22)	cm / kg	0	0						
24	MF	Akira Kajiwara	June 4, 1987 (aged 19)	cm / kg	0	0						
25	MF	Mu Kanazaki	February 16, 1989 (aged 18)	cm / kg	18	2						
26	DF	Tatsuya Ikeda	May 18, 1988 (aged 18)	cm / kg	0	0						
27	MF	Koki Kotegawa	September 12, 1989 (aged 17)	cm / kg	3	0						
28	MF	Platini	June 22, 1987 (aged 19)	cm / kg	4	0						
29	GK	Keisuke Shimizu	November 25, 1988 (aged 18)	cm / kg	0	0						
30	FW	Masato Yamazaki	December 4, 1981 (aged 25)	cm / kg	26	1						
31	DF	Yohei Fukumoto	April 12, 1987 (aged 19)	cm / kg	11	0						
32	MF	Tsukasa Umesaki	February 23, 1987 (aged 20)	cm / kg	19	2						
33	DF	Yoshiaki Fujita	January 12, 1983 (aged 24)	cm / kg	31	2						

== Other pages ==
- (in Japanese) J. League official site
