= 2009 Oita Trinita season =

Oita Trinita
2009 season
- Manager: Chamusca; Hiroaki Matsuyama; Popović
- Stadium: Kyushu Oil Dome
- J. League 1: 17th
- Emperor's Cup: 3rd Round
- J. League Cup: GL-A 4th
- Top goalscorer: Daisuke Takahashi (5)

2009 Oita Trinita season

== Competitions ==
Competitions	Position
J. League 1	17th / 18 clubs
Emperor's Cup	3rd Round
J. League Cup	GL-A 4th / 7 clubs

== Player statistics ==
No.	Pos.	Player	D.o.B. (Age)	Height / Weight	J. League 1		Emperor's Cup		J. League Cup		Total	
No.	Pos.	Player	D.o.B. (Age)	Height / Weight	Apps	Goals	Apps	Goals	Apps	Goals	Apps	Goals
1	GK	Shusaku Nishikawa	June 18, 1986 (aged 22)	cm / kg	34	0						
2	DF	Shusuke Tsubouchi	May 5, 1983 (aged 25)	cm / kg	20	0						
3	MF	Roberto	February 20, 1979 (aged 30)	cm / kg	5	0						
4	DF	Yuki Fukaya	August 1, 1982 (aged 26)	cm / kg	14	1						
5	MF	Edmilson Alves	February 17, 1976 (aged 33)	cm / kg	27	2						
6	DF	Masato Morishige	May 21, 1987 (aged 21)	cm / kg	23	1						
7	MF	Teppei Nishiyama	February 22, 1975 (aged 34)	cm / kg	6	0						
8	MF	Mu Kanazaki	February 16, 1989 (aged 20)	cm / kg	30	1						
9	FW	Yasuhito Morishima	September 18, 1987 (aged 21)	cm / kg	9	1						
10	FW	Ueslei	April 19, 1972 (aged 36)	cm / kg	14	3						
11	MF	Shingo Suzuki	March 20, 1978 (aged 30)	cm / kg	21	0						
13	FW	Daiki Takamatsu	September 8, 1981 (aged 27)	cm / kg	21	3						
14	MF	Akihiro Ienaga	June 13, 1986 (aged 22)	cm / kg	26	1						
16	GK	Seigo Shimokawa	November 17, 1975 (aged 33)	cm / kg	0	0						
17	MF	Fernandinho	January 13, 1981 (aged 28)	cm / kg	15	3						
18	FW	Takahiko Sumida	March 12, 1991 (aged 17)	cm / kg	2	0						
19	FW	Shunsuke Maeda	June 9, 1986 (aged 22)	cm / kg	8	0						
20	MF	Daisuke Takahashi	September 18, 1983 (aged 25)	cm / kg	32	5						
21	MF	Keigo Higashi	July 20, 1990 (aged 18)	cm / kg	23	2						
22	DF	Taikai Uemoto	June 1, 1982 (aged 26)	cm / kg	28	0						
23	GK	Ryosuke Ishida	July 4, 1989 (aged 19)	cm / kg	0	0						
25	DF	Hiroyuki Kobayashi	April 18, 1980 (aged 28)	cm / kg	14	0						
26	DF	Tatsuya Ikeda	May 18, 1988 (aged 20)	cm / kg	0	0						
27	MF	Koki Kotegawa	September 12, 1989 (aged 19)	cm / kg	9	0						
28	MF	Hiroshi Kiyotake	November 12, 1989 (aged 19)	cm / kg	23	3						
29	GK	Keisuke Shimizu	November 25, 1988 (aged 20)	cm / kg	0	0						
30	MF	Yudai Inoue	May 30, 1989 (aged 19)	cm / kg	3	0						
32	MF	Masashi Miyazawa	April 24, 1978 (aged 30)	cm / kg	12	0						
33	DF	Yoshiaki Fujita	January 12, 1983 (aged 26)	cm / kg	28	0						
34	MF	Takashi Umeda	May 30, 1976 (aged 32)	cm / kg	4	0						
35	FW	Choi Jung-Han	June 3, 1989 (aged 19)	cm / kg	4	0						
36	MF	Naoya Kikuchi	November 24, 1984 (aged 24)	cm / kg	10	0						

== Other pages ==
- (in Japanese) J. League official site
