= 2006 Oita Trinita season =

Oita Trinita
2006 season
- Manager: Chamusca
- Stadium: Kyushu Oil Dome
- J. League 1: 8th
- Emperor's Cup: 5th Round
- J. League Cup: GL-B 3rd
- Top goalscorer: Daiki Takamatsu (12)

2006 Oita Trinita season

== Competitions ==
Competitions	Position
J. League 1	8th / 18 clubs
Emperor's Cup	5th Round
J. League Cup	GL-B 3rd / 4 clubs

== Domestic results ==
=== J. League 1 ===
Match	Date	Venue	Opponents	Score
1	2006..			-
2	2006..			-
3	2006..			-
4	2006..			-
5	2006..			-
6	2006..			-
7	2006..			-
8	2006..			-
9	2006..			-
10	2006..			-
11	2006..			-
12	2006..			-
13	2006..			-
14	2006..			-
15	2006..			-
16	2006..			-
17	2006..			-
18	2006..			-
19	2006..			-
20	2006..			-
21	2006..			-
22	2006..			-
23	2006..			-
24	2006..			-
25	2006..			-
26	2006..			-
27	2006..			-
28	2006..			-
29	2006..			-
30	2006..			-
31	2006..			-
32	2006..			-
33	2006..			-
34	2006..			-

=== Emperor's Cup ===
Match	Date	Venue	Opponents	Score
4th Round	2006..			-
5th Round	2006..			-

=== J. League Cup ===
Match	Date	Venue	Opponents	Score
GL-B-1	2006..			-
GL-B-2	2006..			-
GL-B-3	2006..			-
GL-B-4	2006..			-
GL-B-5	2006..			-
GL-B-6	2006..			-

== Player statistics ==
No.	Pos.	Player	D.o.B. (Age)	Height / Weight	J. League 1		Emperor's Cup		J. League Cup		Total	
No.	Pos.	Player	D.o.B. (Age)	Height / Weight	Apps	Goals	Apps	Goals	Apps	Goals	Apps	Goals
1	GK	Shusaku Nishikawa	June 18, 1986 (aged 19)	cm / kg	30	0						
2	DF	Takashi Miki	July 23, 1978 (aged 27)	cm / kg	31	0						
3	DF	Yuichi Shibakoya	June 16, 1983 (aged 22)	cm / kg	3	1						
4	DF	Yuki Fukaya	August 1, 1982 (aged 23)	cm / kg	31	1						
5	MF	Edmilson Alves	February 17, 1976 (aged 30)	cm / kg	30	3						
6	MF	Takashi Umeda	May 30, 1976 (aged 29)	cm / kg	22	0						
7	MF	Teppei Nishiyama	February 22, 1975 (aged 31)	cm / kg	24	1						
8	FW	Shota Matsuhashi	August 3, 1982 (aged 23)	cm / kg	31	10						
9	FW	Osmar	March 27, 1980 (aged 25)	cm / kg	11	3						
9	FW	Rafael	August 27, 1982 (aged 23)	cm / kg	16	1						
11	MF	Túlio	April 25, 1976 (aged 29)	cm / kg	30	2						
13	FW	Daiki Takamatsu	September 8, 1981 (aged 24)	cm / kg	29	12						
14	MF	Tadatoshi Masuda	December 25, 1973 (aged 32)	cm / kg	3	0						
15	DF	Masato Morishige	May 21, 1987 (aged 18)	cm / kg	2	0						
16	GK	Seigo Shimokawa	November 17, 1975 (aged 30)	cm / kg	5	0						
17	DF	Yuichi Nemoto	July 21, 1981 (aged 24)	cm / kg	34	1						
18	FW	Hiroshi Ichihara	April 24, 1987 (aged 18)	cm / kg	1	0						
19	MF	Kazuhiro Kawata	June 11, 1982 (aged 23)	cm / kg	1	0						
20	MF	Daisuke Takahashi	September 18, 1983 (aged 22)	cm / kg	23	5						
21	MF	Tsukasa Umesaki	February 23, 1987 (aged 19)	cm / kg	25	3						
22	DF	Taikai Uemoto	June 1, 1982 (aged 23)	cm / kg	25	0						
23	GK	Masaharu Kawahara	May 30, 1984 (aged 21)	cm / kg	0	0						
24	MF	Akira Kajiwara	June 4, 1987 (aged 18)	cm / kg	0	0						
26	FW	Yoshihiro Uchimura	August 24, 1984 (aged 21)	cm / kg	18	1						
28	MF	Platini	June 22, 1987 (aged 18)	cm / kg	0	0						
30	FW	Masato Yamazaki	December 4, 1981 (aged 24)	cm / kg	25	0						
31	DF	Yohei Fukumoto	April 12, 1987 (aged 18)	cm / kg	14	0						
33	DF	Yoshiaki Fujita	January 12, 1983 (aged 23)	cm / kg	4	0						

== Other pages ==
- (in Japanese) J. League official site
