= 2010 Oita Trinita season =

Oita Trinita
2010 season
- Manager: Hwangbo Kwan
- Stadium: Ōita Bank Dome
- J. League 2: 15th
- Emperor's Cup: 3rd Round
- Top goalscorer: Kim Bo-Kyung (8); Choi Jung-Han (8)

2010 Oita Trinita season

== Competitions ==
| Competitions | Position |
|---|---|
| J. League 2 | 15th / 19 clubs |
| Emperor's Cup | 3rd Round |

== Player statistics ==
| No. | Pos. | Player | D.o.B. (Age) | Height / Weight | J. League 2 | | Emperor's Cup | | Total | |
| No. | Pos. | Player | D.o.B. (Age) | Height / Weight | Apps | Goals | Apps | Goals | Apps | Goals |
|---|---|---|---|---|---|---|---|---|---|---|
| 1 | GK | Seigo Shimokawa | November 17, 1975 (aged 34) | cm / kg | 24 | 0 | | | | |
| 2 | DF | Yusuke Murayama | June 10, 1981 (aged 28) | cm / kg | 7 | 0 | | | | |
| 3 | DF | Jang Kyung-Jin | August 31, 1983 (aged 26) | cm / kg | 15 | 0 | | | | |
| 4 | MF | Tsukasa Masuyama | January 25, 1990 (aged 20) | cm / kg | 11 | 0 | | | | |
| 6 | MF | Kohei Tokita | March 16, 1986 (aged 23) | cm / kg | 17 | 1 | | | | |
| 7 | MF | Koki Kotegawa | September 12, 1989 (aged 20) | cm / kg | 8 | 0 | | | | |
| 8 | MF | Keigo Higashi | July 20, 1990 (aged 19) | cm / kg | 29 | 6 | | | | |
| 9 | FW | Yasuhito Morishima | September 18, 1987 (aged 22) | cm / kg | 25 | 2 | | | | |
| 10 | MF | Kim Bo-Kyung | October 6, 1989 (aged 20) | cm / kg | 27 | 8 | | | | |
| 11 | FW | Choi Jung-Han | June 3, 1989 (aged 20) | cm / kg | 30 | 8 | | | | |
| 13 | FW | Daiki Takamatsu | September 8, 1981 (aged 28) | cm / kg | 18 | 3 | | | | |
| 14 | MF | Yudai Inoue | May 30, 1989 (aged 20) | cm / kg | 22 | 3 | | | | |
| 16 | GK | Keisuke Shimizu | November 25, 1988 (aged 21) | cm / kg | 13 | 0 | | | | |
| 18 | FW | Takahiko Sumida | March 12, 1991 (aged 18) | cm / kg | 5 | 0 | | | | |
| 19 | FW | Shunsuke Maeda | June 9, 1986 (aged 23) | cm / kg | 11 | 0 | | | | |
| 19 | FW | Kazuhisa Kawahara | January 29, 1987 (aged 23) | cm / kg | 17 | 2 | | | | |
| 20 | DF | Yuichi Shibakoya | June 16, 1983 (aged 26) | cm / kg | 1 | 0 | | | | |
| 21 | DF | Ryosuke Tone | October 29, 1991 (aged 18) | cm / kg | 21 | 2 | | | | |
| 22 | MF | Kosuke Uchida | October 2, 1987 (aged 22) | cm / kg | 19 | 0 | | | | |
| 23 | GK | Ryosuke Ishida | July 4, 1989 (aged 20) | cm / kg | 0 | 0 | | | | |
| 24 | MF | Kang Song-Ho | May 28, 1987 (aged 22) | cm / kg | 27 | 0 | | | | |
| 25 | DF | Hiroyuki Kobayashi | April 18, 1980 (aged 29) | cm / kg | 14 | 0 | | | | |
| 26 | DF | Tatsuya Ikeda | May 18, 1988 (aged 21) | cm / kg | 10 | 0 | | | | |
| 27 | DF | Ken Matsubara | February 16, 1993 (aged 17) | cm / kg | 9 | 0 | | | | |
| 28 | MF | Hirotaka Tameda | August 24, 1993 (aged 16) | cm / kg | 5 | 0 | | | | |
| 32 | MF | Masashi Miyazawa | April 24, 1978 (aged 31) | cm / kg | 30 | 0 | | | | |
| 33 | DF | Yoshiaki Fujita | January 12, 1983 (aged 27) | cm / kg | 20 | 0 | | | | |
| 34 | MF | Takashi Umeda | May 30, 1976 (aged 33) | cm / kg | 26 | 0 | | | | |
| 36 | MF | Naoya Kikuchi | November 24, 1984 (aged 25) | cm / kg | 35 | 0 | | | | |

== Other pages ==
- (in Japanese) J. League official site
