= Yuichi =

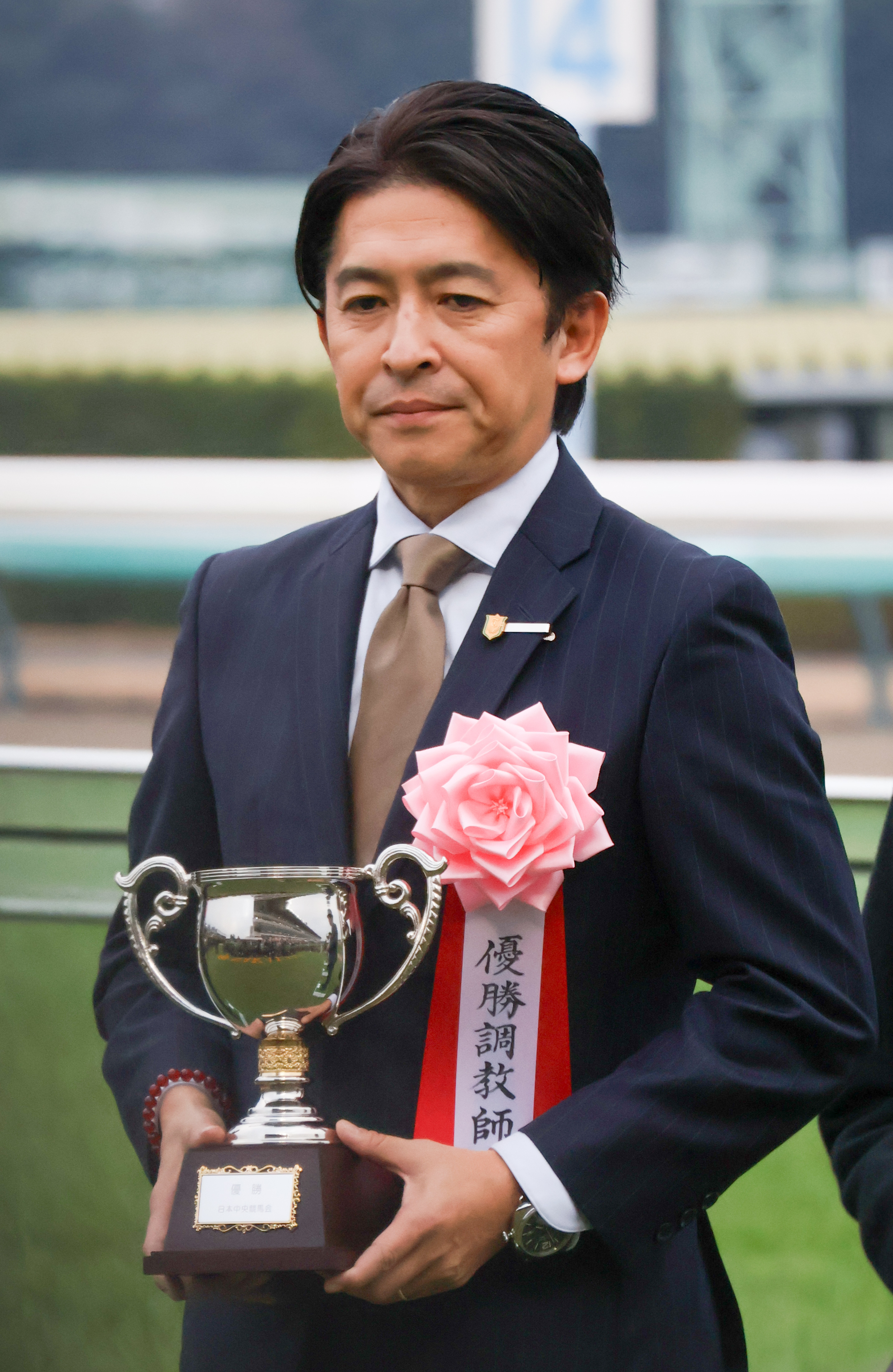
- Yuichi Fukunaga, Japanese horse trainer and retired jockey
- Pronunciation: jɯɯitɕi, jɯitɕi (IPA)
- Gender: Male

Origin
- Origin: Japanese
- Meaning: Different meanings depending on the kanji used

Other names
- Alternative spelling: Yuiti (Kunrei-shiki) Yuiti (Nihon-shiki) Yūichi, Yuichi, Yuuichi (Hepburn)

Yūichi, Yuichi, or Yuuichi is a masculine Japanese given name.

== Written forms ==
Yūichi can be written using different combinations of kanji characters. Here are some examples:

- 勇一, "courage, 1"
- 祐一, "to help, 1"
- 祐市, "to help, city"
- 佑一, "to help, 1"
- 佑市, "to help, city"
- 裕一, "abundant, 1"
- 裕市, "abundant, city"
- 雄一, "male, 1"
- 友一, "friend, 1"
- 悠一, "long time, 1"
- 悠市, "long time, city"
- 優一, "superiority, 1"
- 有一, "to have, 1"
- 邑一, "village, 1"

The name can also be written in hiragana ゆういち or katakana ユウイチ.

Yuichi is a separate given name.

- 諭一, "to persuade, 1"
- 愉一, "pleased, 1"
- 愈一, "more and more, 1"

And can also be written in hiragana ゆいち or katakana ユイチ.

== Notable people with the name ==
- Yuichi Akasaka (赤坂 雄一; born 1967), Japanese short track speed skater
- Yuichi Fukunaga (福永 祐一; born 1976), Japanese trainer and former jockey
- Yuichi Hirano (平野 佑一; born 1996), Japanese footballer
- Yuichi Honda (本多 雄一; born 1984), Japanese baseball player
- Yuichi Ito (井藤 祐一; born 1986), Japanese tennis player
- Yuichi Kodama (児玉 裕一; born 1975), Japanese video director
- Yūichi Komano (駒野 友一; born 1981), Japanese football player
- Yuichi Matsumoto (松元 ユウイチ; born 1980), Brazilian baseball player
- Yuichi Mizutani (水谷 雄一; born 1980), Japanese football player
- Yuichi Nakagaichi (中垣内 祐一; born 1967), Japanese former volleyball player
- Yuichi Nakamaru (中丸 雄一; born 1983), member of the boy band KAT-TUN
- Yuichi Nakamura (actor) (中村 優一; born 1987), Japanese actor
- Yuichi Nakamura (voice actor) (中村 悠一; born 1980), Japanese voice actor
- Yuichi Nemoto (根本 裕一; born 1981), Japanese football player
- Yuichi Nishimura (西村 雄一; born 1972), Japanese football referee
- Yuichi Ogawa (小川 友一; born 1946), Japanese politician of the Liberal Democratic Party
- Yuichi Onda (恩田 祐一; born 1980), Japanese cross-country skier
- Yūichi Sasamoto (笹本 祐一; born 1963), Japanese science fiction writer
- Yuichi Shibakoya (柴小屋 雄一; born 1983), Japanese football player
- Yūichi Suzumoto (涼元 悠一; born 1969), Japanese novelist
- Yuichi Takai (高井 有一; 1932–2016), Japanese author
- Yūichi Tanaka (田中 悠一; born 1985), Japanese shogi player
- Yuichi Tsuchiya (土屋 裕一; born 1979), Japanese actor and full-time member of the 4-man theatre troupe *pnish*
- Yuichi Yamauchi (山内 祐一; born 1984), Japanese football player
- Takahashi Yuichi (高橋 由一; 1828–1894), Japanese painter

== Fictional characters ==
- Yuichi Aizawa (相沢 祐一), character in Kanon
- Yuichi Tate (楯 祐一), character in My-HiME and My-Otome
- Yuichi Kayama (加山 雄一), character in Sakura Wars
- Yuichi "Ichi" Taira (鯛良 優一), character in Paranoia Agent
- Yuichi Beelzebub, character in Yondemasuyo, Azazel-san
- Yuichi Jin (迅 悠一), character in World Trigger
- Yuichi Tsurugi (剣城 優一), character in Inazuma Eleven GO.
