= 2003 Oita Trinita season =

Oita Trinita
2003 season
- Manager: Shinji Kobayashi
- Stadium: Ōita Stadium
- J.League 1: 14th
- Emperor's Cup: 3rd Round
- J.League Cup: GL-D 3rd
- Top goalscorer: Takayuki Yoshida (7)
Home colours	Away colours

2003 Oita Trinita season

== Competitions ==
Competitions	Position
J.League 1	14th / 16 clubs
Emperor's Cup	3rd round
J.League Cup	GL-D 3rd / 3 clubs

== Domestic results ==
=== J.League 1 ===
Match	Date	Venue	Opponents	Score
1-1	2003.3.23	Sendai Stadium	Vegalta Sendai	0-1
1-2	2003.4.5	Ōita Stadium	JEF United Ichihara	0-4
1-3	2003.4.12	Ōita Stadium	Gamba Osaka	3-2
1-4	2003.4.20	International Stadium Yokohama	Yokohama F. Marinos	0-1
1-5	2003.4.26	Ajinomoto Stadium	Tokyo Verdy 1969	2-0
1-6	2003.4.29	Ōita Stadium	Cerezo Osaka	1-2
1-7	2003.5.5	Mizuho Athletic Stadium	Nagoya Grampus Eight	1-2
1-8	2003.5.10	Ōita Stadium	Kashima Antlers	1-1
1-9	2003.5.17	Ajinomoto Stadium	FC Tokyo	1-2
1-10	2003.5.24	Ōita Stadium	Kashiwa Reysol	0-0
1-11	2003.7.5	Urawa Komaba Stadium	Urawa Red Diamonds	1-2
1-12	2003.7.13	Ōita Stadium	Júbilo Iwata	0-4
1-13	2003.7.19	Nishikyogoku Athletic Stadium	Kyoto Purple Sanga	2-0
1-14	2003.7.26	Kobe Wing Stadium	Vissel Kobe	8-0
1-15	2003.8.2	Ōita Stadium	Shimizu S-Pulse	0-0
2-1	2003.8.17	Osaka Expo '70 Stadium	Gamba Osaka	0-1
2-2	2003.8.23	Ōita Stadium	Yokohama F. Marinos	1-1
2-3	2003.8.30	Kashima Soccer Stadium	Kashima Antlers	0-1
2-4	2003.9.7	Ōita Stadium	FC Tokyo	0-0
2-5	2003.9.13	Hitachi Kashiwa Soccer Stadium	Kashiwa Reysol	0-0
2-6	2003.9.20	Ōita Stadium	Urawa Red Diamonds	1-3
2-7	2003.9.23	Nihondaira Sports Stadium	Shimizu S-Pulse	0-0
2-8	2003.9.27	Ōita Stadium	Vissel Kobe	2-2
2-9	2003.10.5	Ōita Stadium	Tokyo Verdy 1969	0-2
2-10	2003.10.18	Yamaha Stadium	Júbilo Iwata	0-2
2-11	2003.10.25	KKWing Stadium	Kyoto Purple Sanga	1-0
2-12	2003.11.8	Nagai Stadium	Cerezo Osaka	0-2
2-13	2003.11.15	Ōita Stadium	Nagoya Grampus Eight	0-0
2-14	2003.11.23	Ichihara Seaside Stadium	JEF United Ichihara	1-1
2-15	2003.11.29	Ōita Stadium	Vegalta Sendai	1-1

=== Emperor's Cup ===
Match	Date	Venue	Opponents	Score
3rd round	2003..			-

=== J.League Cup ===
Match	Date	Venue	Opponents	Score
GL-D-1	2003..			-
GL-D-2	2003..			-
GL-D-3	2003..			-
GL-D-4	2003..			-

== Player statistics ==
No.	Pos.	Player	D.o.B. (Age)	Height / Weight	J.League 1		Emperor's Cup		J.League Cup		Total	
No.	Pos.	Player	D.o.B. (Age)	Height / Weight	Apps	Goals	Apps	Goals	Apps	Goals	Apps	Goals
1	GK	Hayato Okanaka	September 26, 1968 (aged 34)	cm / kg	28	0						
2	DF	Takashi Miki	July 23, 1978 (aged 24)	cm / kg	30	0						
3	DF	Sandro	May 19, 1973 (aged 29)	cm / kg	27	2						
4	DF	Tomohiro Katanosaka	April 18, 1971 (aged 31)	cm / kg	9	0						
5	DF	Tetsuro Uki	October 4, 1971 (aged 31)	cm / kg	7	0						
6	DF	Daiki Wakamatsu	August 2, 1976 (aged 26)	cm / kg	14	0						
7	MF	Teppei Nishiyama	February 22, 1975 (aged 28)	cm / kg	17	0						
8	MF	Yoshito Terakawa	September 6, 1974 (aged 28)	cm / kg	30	4						
9	FW	Takayuki Yoshida	March 14, 1977 (aged 25)	cm / kg	29	7						
10	MF	Rodrigo Mendes	August 9, 1975 (aged 27)	cm / kg	13	3						
10	FW	Róbson	May 10, 1969 (aged 33)	cm / kg	7	0						
10	MF	Edmilson Alves	February 17, 1976 (aged 27)	cm / kg	5	0						
11	FW	Andradina	September 13, 1974 (aged 28)	cm / kg	10	0						
11	FW	Will	December 15, 1973 (aged 29)	cm / kg	16	2						
13	FW	Daiki Takamatsu	September 8, 1981 (aged 21)	cm / kg	26	4						
14	MF	Haruki Seto	March 14, 1978 (aged 24)	cm / kg	14	0						
15	MF	Takashi Umeda	May 30, 1976 (aged 26)	cm / kg	30	2						
16	MF	Keita Kanemoto	July 13, 1977 (aged 25)	cm / kg	8	0						
17	GK	Ryoji Kawamoto	September 25, 1982 (aged 20)	cm / kg	0	0						
18	MF	Hiromi Kojima	December 12, 1977 (aged 25)	cm / kg	0	0						
18	MF	Shinichi Muto	April 2, 1973 (aged 29)	cm / kg	9	0						
19	FW	Michiaki Kakimoto	October 6, 1977 (aged 25)	cm / kg	1	0						
19	FW	Kim Dong-hyun	May 20, 1984 (aged 18)	cm / kg	1	0						
20	FW	Shota Matsuhashi	August 3, 1982 (aged 20)	cm / kg	3	0						
21	GK	Kenji Koyama	September 5, 1972 (aged 30)	cm / kg	0	0						
22	MF	Kentaro Uramoto	November 13, 1982 (aged 20)	cm / kg	0	0						
23	DF	Koji Arimura	August 25, 1976 (aged 26)	cm / kg	27	0						
24	DF	Tomoya Kanamori	April 2, 1982 (aged 20)	cm / kg	0	0						
25	MF	Kim Sung-Kil	July 8, 1983 (aged 19)	cm / kg	0	0						
25	FW	Ryosuke Kijima	May 29, 1979 (aged 23)	cm / kg	4	0						
26	FW	Yoshihiro Uchimura	August 24, 1984 (aged 18)	cm / kg	6	0						
27	DF	Yuichi Shibakoya	June 16, 1983 (aged 19)	cm / kg	0	0						
28	MF	Tomoaki Komorida	July 10, 1981 (aged 21)	cm / kg	15	0						
29	GK	Koji Ezumi	December 18, 1978 (aged 24)	cm / kg	2	0						
30	DF	Takashi Kuramoto	August 8, 1984 (aged 18)	cm / kg	0	0						
31	GK	Erikson Noguchipinto	January 27, 1981 (aged 22)	cm / kg	0	0						
32	MF	Tomohisa Yoshida	May 27, 1984 (aged 18)	cm / kg	0	0						
33	DF	Tetsuya Yamazaki	July 25, 1978 (aged 24)	cm / kg	26	1						
34	DF	Ryuji Michiki	August 25, 1973 (aged 29)	cm / kg	0	0						
35	FW	Yūzō Tashiro	July 22, 1982 (aged 20)	cm / kg	1	0						

== Other pages ==
- (in Japanese) J. League official site
