= Tetsuya Yamazaki =

Japanese footballer

Tetsuya Yamazaki 山崎 哲也
Personal information
- Full name: Tetsuya Yamazaki
- Date of birth: July 25, 1978 (age 48)
- Place of birth: Shizuoka, Japan
- Height: 1.79 m (5 ft 10 1/2 in)
- Position: Defender

Youth career
- 1994–1996: Shizuoka Gakuen High School

Senior career*
Years	Team	Apps	(Gls)
1997–1998	Montedio Yamagata	3	(0)
1999–2004	Oita Trinita	104	(4)
2005–2007	Cerezo Osaka	28	(0)
2008	Oita Trinita	4	(0)
Total		139	(4)
Medal record
Oita Trinita
Winner	J.League Cup	2008
- * Club domestic league appearances and goals

Tetsuya Yamazaki (山崎 哲也, Yamazaki Tetsuya; born July 25, 1978) is a former Japanese football player. His elder brother Takahiro is a former Japanese baseball player.

== Playing career ==
Yamazaki was born in Shizuoka Prefecture on July 25, 1978. After graduating from Shizuoka Gakuen High School, he joined Japan Football League club Montedio Yamagata in 1997. However he could hardly play in the match until 1998. In 1999, he moved to newly was promoted to J2 League club, Oita Trinita. He played many matches as center back from 1999. In 2002, although he could not play many matches, the club won the champions and was promoted to J1 League. He also became a regular player as right side back again in 2003. However his opportunity to play decreased in 2004. In 2005, he moved to Cerezo Osaka. He played many matches as center back until 2005. However the club was relegated to J2 from 2007 and he could not play at all in the match in 2007. In 2008, he returned to Oita Trinita. He retired at the end of the 2008 season.

== Club statistics ==
Club performance			League		Cup		League Cup		Total	
Season	Club	League	Apps	Goals	Apps	Goals	Apps	Goals	Apps	Goals
Japan			League		Emperor's Cup		J.League Cup		Total	
1997	Montedio Yamagata	Football League	0	0	0	0	-		0	0
1998	Montedio Yamagata	Football League	3	0	2	0	-		5	0
1999	Oita Trinita	J2 League	22	1	2	0	3	0	27	1
2000	Oita Trinita	J2 League	10	0	0	0	1	0	11	0
2001	Oita Trinita	J2 League	25	1	3	1	1	0	29	2
2002	Oita Trinita	J2 League	8	1	0	0	-		8	1
2003	Oita Trinita	J1 League	26	1	0	0	3	0	29	1
2004	Oita Trinita	J1 League	13	0	0	0	6	0	19	0
2005	Cerezo Osaka	J1 League	13	0	0	0	4	0	17	0
2006	Cerezo Osaka	J1 League	15	0	1	0	5	0	21	0
2007	Cerezo Osaka	J2 League	0	0	0	0	-		0	0
2008	Oita Trinita	J1 League	4	0	1	0	1	0	6	0
Total			139	4	9	1	24	0	172	5
