= Yuichi Nemoto =

Japanese footballer

Yuichi Nemoto 根本 裕一
Personal information
- Full name: Yuichi Nemoto
- Date of birth: July 21, 1981 (age 45)
- Place of birth: Kashima, Ibaraki, Japan
- Height: 1.74 m (5 ft 8 1/2 in)
- Position: Defender

Youth career
- 1994–1999: Kashima Antlers

Senior career*
Years	Team	Apps	(Gls)
2000–2001	Kashima Antlers	5	(0)
2002	Cerezo Osaka	34	(4)
2003	Vegalta Sendai	28	(2)
2004–2008	Oita Trinita	100	(3)
2008	JEF United Chiba	7	(0)
2009–2012	Zweigen Kanazawa	68	(4)
Total		242	(13)
Medal record
Kashima Antlers
Winner	J1 League	2000
Winner	J1 League	2001
Winner	J.League Cup	2000
Winner	Emperor's Cup	2000
Oita Trinita
Winner	J.League Cup	2008
Representing Japan
Asian Games
Silver medal – second place	2002 Busan	Team
AFC U-19 Championship
Silver medal – second place	2000 Iran
- * Club domestic league appearances and goals

Yuichi Nemoto (根本 裕一, Nemoto Yūichi; born July 21, 1981) is a former Japanese football player.

== Playing career ==
Nemoto was born in Kashima on July 21, 1981. He joined J1 League club Kashima Antlers based in his local from youth team in 2000. Although he played several matches as left side back, he could not play many matches until 2001. In 2002, he moved to J2 League club Cerezo Osaka. He became a regular player as left side midfielder and played many matches and the club won the 2nd place and was promoted to J1 from 2003. In 2003, he moved to J1 club Vegalta Sendai. He played many matches as regular left side back and was selected Fair Play award. However the club was relegated to J2 from 2004. In 2004, he moved to J1 club Oita Trinita. Although he was not regular player until 2005, he became a regular player as left side midfielder in summer 2005. In 2006, he played in all 34 matches and was selected Fair Play award second time. However his opportunity to play decreased behind new member Shingo Suzuki from summer 2007. In June 2008, he moved to J1 club JEF United Chiba. However he could not play many matches. In 2009, he moved to Regional Leagues club Zweigen Kanazawa. He played in all matches in 2009 and the club was promoted to Japan Football League from 2010. he played many matches as regular player until 2012 and retired end of 2012 season.

== Club statistics ==
Club performance			League		Cup		League Cup		Total	
Season	Club	League	Apps	Goals	Apps	Goals	Apps	Goals	Apps	Goals
Japan			League		Emperor's Cup		J.League Cup		Total	
2000	Kashima Antlers	J1 League	0	0	2	0	2	0	4	0
2001	Kashima Antlers	J1 League	5	0	0	0	0	0	5	0
2002	Cerezo Osaka	J2 League	34	4	3	1	-		37	5
2003	Vegalta Sendai	J1 League	28	2	1	0	6	0	35	2
2004	Oita Trinita	J1 League	18	2	1	0	4	0	23	2
2005	Oita Trinita	J1 League	23	0	1	0	2	0	26	0
2006	Oita Trinita	J1 League	34	1	2	0	6	0	42	1
2007	Oita Trinita	J1 League	20	0	0	0	3	0	23	0
2008	Oita Trinita	J1 League	5	0	0	0	3	0	8	0
2008	JEF United Chiba	J1 League	7	0	1	0	0	0	8	0
2009	Zweigen Kanazawa	Regional Leagues	14	2	2	0	-		16	2
2010	Zweigen Kanazawa	Football League	27	1	1	0	-		28	1
2011	Zweigen Kanazawa	Football League	4	0	0	0	-		4	0
2012	Zweigen Kanazawa	Football League	23	1	1	0	-		24	1
Total			242	13	15	1	26	0	283	14
