= Shingo Suzuki =

Japanese footballer

Shingo Suzuki 鈴木 慎吾
Personal information
- Full name: Shingo Suzuki
- Date of birth: March 20, 1978 (age 48)
- Place of birth: Konosu, Saitama, Japan
- Height: 1.68 m (5 ft 6 in)
- Position: Midfielder

Youth career
- 1993–1995: Urawa Reds

Senior career*
Years	Team	Apps	(Gls)
1996	Urawa Reds	0	(0)
1997–1998	Yokogawa Electric		
1999–2007	Albirex Niigata	222	(53)
2002–2003	→Kyoto Purple Sanga (loan)	60	(8)
2007–2009	Oita Trinita	70	(5)
2010–2011	Kyoto Sanga FC	7	(1)
2012	Tokyo Verdy	0	(0)
2012	Giravanz Kitakyushu	9	(0)
2013	Albirex Niigata Singapore	24	(5)
Total		392	(72)
Medal record
Kyoto Sanga FC
Winner	Emperor's Cup	2002
Runner-up	Emperor's Cup	2011
Oita Trinita
Winner	J.League Cup	2008
- * Club domestic league appearances and goals

Shingo Suzuki (鈴木 慎吾, Suzuki Shingo; born March 20, 1978) is a former Japanese football player.

== Playing career ==
Suzuki was born Saitama City and joined local side Urawa Reds as a trainee from school. He turned professional in 1996, but was released in 1997 without making his first team debut for Reds, signing for Regional Leagues side Yokogawa Electric.

Suzuki moved to J2 League side Albirex Niigata in January 1999. He made his debut for the club in a 1–0 victory over Montedio Yamagata, scoring the winner in the 98th minute. He played as regular player in 3 seasons. In 2002, he moved to Kyoto Purple Sanga (later Kyoto Sanga FC) on loan. He played as left midfielder in all matches in 2 seasons. The club also won the champions 2002 Emperor's Cup first major title in the club history. In 2004, he returned to newly was promoted to J1 League club, Albirex Niigata. He became a fan's favourite during his seven seasons at the club, playing a total of 222 games and scoring 53 goals.

In July 2007, he moved to Oita Trinita. He became a regular player as left side midfielder. In 2008, the club won the champions J.League Cup first major title in club history. However he could not play at Final for suspension. In 2009, although he played as regular player, his opportunity to play decreased in late 2009 and the club was relegated to J2.

In 2010, he moved to Kyoto Sanga FC for the first time in 7 years. However he could hardly play in the match. The club was also relegated to J2 from 2011. In 2012, he moved to Tokyo Verdy. However he could not play at all in the match and he moved to Giravanz Kitakyushu in August.

In February 2013, Suzuki signed for the Albirex Niigata Singapore of Singapore League. He made his Singapore debut in a game against Home United the following month. Suzuki retired from playing professionally at the end of the season.

== Coaching career ==
Suzuki took the position as the academy coach of Kyoto Sanga FC.

== Club statistics ==
Club	season	League		Emperor's Cup		J.League Cup		Total	
Club	season	Apps	Goals	Apps	Goals	Apps	Goals	Apps	Goals
Urawa Reds	1996	0	0	0	0	0	0	0	0
Albirex Niigata	1999	30	8	3	0	2	0	35	8
Albirex Niigata	2000	40	11	3	3	2	0	45	14
Albirex Niigata	2001	42	16	3	0	2	0	47	16
Kyoto Purple Sanga	2002	30	7	5	0	6	3	41	10
Kyoto Purple Sanga	2003	30	1	1	0	4	0	35	1
Albirex Niigata	2004	30	5	1	0	5	2	36	7
Albirex Niigata	2005	29	4	1	0	6	0	36	4
Albirex Niigata	2006	34	9	2	0	5	1	41	10
Albirex Niigata	2007	17	0	0	0	4	0	21	0
Oita Trinita	2007	15	3	2	0	0	0	17	3
Oita Trinita	2008	34	2	1	0	9	2	44	4
Oita Trinita	2009	21	0	0	0	1	0	22	0
Kyoto Sanga FC	2010	3	0	0	0	3	0	6	0
Kyoto Sanga FC	2011	4	1	0	0	–		4	1
Tokyo Verdy	2012	0	0	0	0	–		0	0
Giravanz Kitakyushu	2012	9	0	1	0	–		10	0
Career total		368	67	23	3	49	8	440	78
