= Daiki Takamatsu =

Japanese footballer (born 1981)

Daiki Takamatsu 高松 大樹
Personal information
- Full name: Daiki Takamatsu
- Date of birth: September 8, 1981 (age 45)
- Place of birth: Ube, Yamaguchi, Japan
- Height: 1.83 m (6 ft 0 in)
- Position: Forward

Youth career
- 1997–1999: Tatara Gakuen High School

Senior career*
Years	Team	Apps	(Gls)
2000–2016	Oita Trinita	360	(75)
2011	→FC Tokyo (loan)	5	(0)
Total		365	(75)

International career
2004	Japan U-23	3	(1)
2006–2007	Japan	2	(0)
Medal record
Oita Trinita
Winner	J.League Cup	2008
FC Tokyo
Winner	Emperor's Cup	2011
- * Club domestic league appearances and goals

Daiki Takamatsu (高松 大樹, Takamatsu Daiki; born September 8, 1981) is a former Japanese football player. He played for Japan national team.

== Club career ==
Takamatsu was born in Ube on September 8, 1981. After graduating from high school, he joined J2 League side Oita Trinita in 2000. He played 6 games and scored 1 goal in his first season. In 2001, he became a regular playing 22 league games and scored 8 goals. The club won the champions in 2002 and was promoted to J1 League. He became a center player of the team with the growing number of young players, Shusaku Nishikawa, Masato Morishige, Mu Kanazaki, Hiroshi Kiyotake and also served captain from 2008. In 2008, although he did not play many matches for injury, the club won J.League Cup their first major title. At the J.League Cup Final, he scored a winning goal and he was elected MVP award. However the club was relegated to J2 League end of 2009 season. Although many main players left the club for financial strain, he remained the club. He moved to FC Tokyo on loan in 2011. He returned to Oita Trinita in 2012. He played many matches as substitutes and the club was promoted to J1 League in 2013. However the club was relegated to J2 League in 2014 and J3 League in 2016. In 2016, the club won the champions and was promoted to J2 League. However he could hardly play in the match and retired end of 2016 season.

== National team career ==
In August 2004, Takamatsu was selected Japan U-23 national team for 2004 Summer Olympics. He played all 3 matches and scored a goal against Italy.

The 2006 season turned out to be the most prolific season for him scoring 12 league goals. The reward was the first Japan national team cap handed by national coach Ivica Osim on November 15, 2006 in a 2007 Asian Cup qualification against Saudi Arabia at Sapporo Dome when he replaced Kazuki Ganaha in the 74th minute. He played 2 games for Japan until 2007.

== Career statistics ==
=== Club ===
Appearances and goals by club, season and competition
Club	Season	League			Emperor's Cup		J.League Cup		Total	
Club	Season	Division	Apps	Goals	Apps	Goals	Apps	Goals	Apps	Goals
Oita Trinita	2000	J2 League	6	1	1	0	0	0	7	1
Oita Trinita	2001	J2 League	22	8	0	0	2	1	24	9
Oita Trinita	2002	J2 League	33	6	3	0	-		36	6
Oita Trinita	2003	J1 League	26	4	0	0	3	1	29	5
Oita Trinita	2004	J1 League	24	8	2	0	2	1	28	9
Oita Trinita	2005	J1 League	21	5	1	0	3	1	25	6
Oita Trinita	2006	J1 League	29	12	2	0	5	1	36	13
Oita Trinita	2007	J1 League	30	8	2	2	4	1	36	11
Oita Trinita	2008	J1 League	16	0	0	0	5	2	21	2
Oita Trinita	2009	J1 League	21	3	1	1	0	0	22	4
Oita Trinita	2010	J2 League	18	3	1	0	-		19	3
FC Tokyo	2011	J2 League	5	0	0	0	-		5	0
Oita Trinita	2012	J2 League	32	5	1	0	-		33	5
Oita Trinita	2013	J1 League	28	5	1	0	1	0	30	5
Oita Trinita	2014	J2 League	24	3	2	1	-		26	4
Oita Trinita	2015	J2 League	22	3	0	0	-		22	3
Oita Trinita	2016	J3 League	8	1	0	0	-		8	1
Career total			365	75	17	4	25	8	407	87

=== International ===
Japan national team
Year	Apps	Goals
2006	1	0
2007	1	0
Total	2	0

== Personal honors ==
- J.League Cup MVP - 2008

== Achievements ==
- Nominated for FIFA World Player of the Year: 2003
