= Takashi Umeda =

Japanese footballer

Takashi Umeda 梅田 高志
Personal information
- Full name: Takashi Umeda
- Date of birth: May 30, 1976 (age 50)
- Place of birth: Kakamigahara, Gifu, Japan
- Height: 1.74 m (5 ft 8 1/2 in)
- Position: Midfielder

Youth career
- 1992–1994: Gifu Technical High School

Senior career*
Years	Team	Apps	(Gls)
1995–1997	Seino Transportation	44	(3)
1998–2010	Oita Trinita	246	(13)
2008	→ FC Gifu (loan)	39	(5)
Total		329	(21)
- * Club domestic league appearances and goals

Takashi Umeda (梅田 高志, Umeda Takashi; born May 30, 1976) is a former Japanese football player.

== Playing career ==
Umeda was born in Kakamigahara on May 30, 1976. After graduating from high school, he joined Japan Football League (JFL) club Seino Transportation in 1995. He played many matches from first season and became a regular player in 1997. However the club was disbanded end of 1997 season. In 1998, he moved to JFL club Oita Trinity (later Oita Trinita). He played many matches and the club was promoted to new league J2 League from 1999. Although his opportunity to play decreased from 2000, the club won the champions in 2002 and was promoted to J1 League from 2003. He also became a regular player as defensive midfielder from 2003. However his opportunity to play decreased in 2007. In 2008, he moved to newly was promoted to J2 club, FC Gifu based in his local on loan and he played as regular player. In 2009, he returned to Oita Trinita. However he could not play many matches in 2009 and the club was relegated to J2 from 2010. The club released many central player and he played many matches as regular player in 2010. He retired end of 2010 season.

== Career statistics ==
Appearances and goals by club, season and competition
Club	Season	League			Emperor's Cup		J.League Cup		Total	
Club	Season	Division	Apps	Goals	Apps	Goals	Apps	Goals	Apps	Goals
Seino Transportation	1995	Football League	13	1	0	0	—		13	1
Seino Transportation	1996	Football League	2	0	0	0	—		2	0
Seino Transportation	1997	Football League	29	2	2	0	—		31	2
Oita Trinity	1998	Football League	22	2	3	2	—		25	4
Oita Trinita	1999	J2 League	28	1	3	0	4	0	35	1
Oita Trinita	2000	J2 League	12	1	2	0	1	0	15	1
Oita Trinita	2001	J2 League	23	3	3	1	1	0	27	4
Oita Trinita	2002	J2 League	14	1	3	0	—		17	1
Oita Trinita	2003	J1 League	30	2	1	0	1	0	32	2
Oita Trinita	2004	J1 League	25	0	2	0	5	0	32	0
Oita Trinita	2005	J1 League	29	3	2	0	4	0	35	3
Oita Trinita	2006	J1 League	22	0	3	0	2	0	27	0
Oita Trinita	2007	J1 League	11	0	1	0	3	0	15	0
FC Gifu	2008	J2 League	39	5	2	0	—		41	5
Oita Trinita	2009	J1 League	4	0	1	0	4	1	9	1
Oita Trinita	2010	J2 League	26	0	0	0	—		26	0
Career total			329	21	27	3	26	1	382	25
