= 2002 Oita Trinita season =

Oita Trinita
2002 season
- Manager: Shinji Kobayashi
- Stadium: Oita Stadium
- J. League 2: 1st
- Emperor's Cup: 4th Round
- Top goalscorer: Andradina (18)
Home colours	Away colours

2002 Oita Trinita season.

== Competitions ==
Competitions	Position
J. League 2	1st / 12 clubs
Emperor's Cup	4th Round

== Domestic results ==
=== J. League 2 ===
Match	Date	Venue	Opponents	Score
1	2002.3.3	Hakata no mori stadium	Avispa Fukuoka	2-1
2	2002.3.9	Ōita Stadium	Montedio Yamagata	2-0
3	2002.3.17	Niigata Stadium	Albirex Niigata	1-0
4	2002.3.21	Ōita Stadium	Sagan Tosu	2-0
5	2002.3.24	Yumenoshima Stadium	Yokohama F.C.	2-1
6	2002.3.30	Nagai Aid Stadium	Cerezo Osaka	3-0
7	2002.4.6	Ōita Stadium	Omiya Ardija	2-3
8	2002.4.10	Todoroki Athletics Stadium	Kawasaki Frontale	1-1
9	2002.4.13	Oita (ja:大分市営陸上競技場)	Ventforet Kofu	1-0
10	2002.4.20	Hiratsuka Athletics Stadium	Shonan Bellmare	1-0
11	2002.4.24	Oita (ja:大分市営陸上競技場)	Mito HollyHock	1-0
12	2002.4.27	Yamagata Park Stadium	Montedio Yamagata	1-0
13	2002.5.3	Tosu Stadium	Sagan Tosu	1-0
14	2002.5.6	Oita (ja:大分市営陸上競技場)	Yokohama F.C.	2-0
15	2002.5.12	Nagasaki (ja:長崎県立総合運動公園陸上競技場)	Cerezo Osaka	1-1
16	2002.7.6	Ōmiya Park Soccer Stadium	Omiya Ardija	1-0
17	2002.7.10	KKWing Stadium	Kawasaki Frontale	5-0
18	2002.7.13	Hitachinaka (ja:ひたちなか市総合運動公園陸上競技場)	Mito HollyHock	2-2
19	2002.7.20	Ōita Stadium	Avispa Fukuoka	0-0
20	2002.7.24	Kose Sports Stadium	Ventforet Kofu	2-1
21	2002.7.27	Ōita Stadium	Shonan Bellmare	0-0
22	2002.8.3	Ōita Stadium	Albirex Niigata	1-1
23	2002.8.7	Suzuka (ja:三重県営鈴鹿スポーツガーデン)	Cerezo Osaka	0-3
24	2002.8.10	Oita (ja:大分市営陸上競技場)	Mito HollyHock	3-2
25	2002.8.17	Todoroki Athletics Stadium	Kawasaki Frontale	1-1
26	2002.8.21	Oita (ja:大分市営陸上競技場)	Ventforet Kofu	0-1
27	2002.8.25	Ōita Stadium	Montedio Yamagata	0-1
28	2002.9.3	Hakata no mori stadium	Avispa Fukuoka	2-1
29	2002.9.7	Ōita Stadium	Omiya Ardija	0-0
30	2002.9.11	Hiratsuka Athletics Stadium	Shonan Bellmare	0-1
31	2002.9.15	Ōita Stadium	Sagan Tosu	2-0
32	2002.9.21	Edogawa Stadium	Yokohama F.C.	4-3
33	2002.9.25	Niigata Stadium	Albirex Niigata	1-1
34	2002.9.28	Ōita Stadium	Cerezo Osaka	1-1
35	2002.10.5	Kose Sports Stadium	Ventforet Kofu	2-1
36	2002.10.9	Oita (ja:大分市営陸上競技場)	Shonan Bellmare	2-0
37	2002.10.13	Tosu Stadium	Sagan Tosu	3-2
38	2002.10.19	Yamagata Park Stadium	Montedio Yamagata	4-1
39	2002.10.23	Oita (ja:大分市営陸上競技場)	Albirex Niigata	2-1
40	2002.10.26	Oita (ja:大分市営陸上競技場)	Yokohama F.C.	1-0
41	2002.11.2	Ōmiya Park Soccer Stadium	Omiya Ardija	1-0
42	2002.11.9	Ōita Stadium	Kawasaki Frontale	2-1
43	2002.11.16	Kasamatsu Stadium	Mito HollyHock	0-1
44	2002.11.24	Ōita Stadium	Avispa Fukuoka	2-1

=== Emperor's Cup ===
Match	Date	Venue	Opponents	Score
1st Round	2002..	[[]]	[[]]	-
2nd Round	2002..	[[]]	[[]]	-
3rd Round	2002..	[[]]	[[]]	-
4th Round	2002..	[[]]	[[]]	-

== Player statistics ==
No.	Pos.	Player	D.o.B. (Age)	Height / Weight	J. League 2		Emperor's Cup		Total	
No.	Pos.	Player	D.o.B. (Age)	Height / Weight	Apps	Goals	Apps	Goals	Apps	Goals
1	GK	Hayato Okanaka	September 26, 1968 (aged 33)	cm / kg	42	0				
2	DF	Takashi Miki	July 23, 1978 (aged 23)	cm / kg	44	0				
3	DF	Sandro	May 19, 1973 (aged 28)	cm / kg	37	4				
4	DF	Tetsuya Yamazaki	July 25, 1978 (aged 23)	cm / kg	8	1				
5	DF	Tetsuro Uki	October 4, 1971 (aged 30)	cm / kg	42	0				
6	DF	Daiki Wakamatsu	August 2, 1976 (aged 25)	cm / kg	35	3				
7	MF	Teppei Nishiyama	February 22, 1975 (aged 27)	cm / kg	40	4				
8	MF	Iwao Yamane	July 31, 1976 (aged 25)	cm / kg	26	4				
9	FW	Takayuki Yoshida	March 14, 1977 (aged 24)	cm / kg	41	9				
10	MF	Fabinho	June 26, 1973 (aged 28)	cm / kg	33	7				
11	FW	Andradina	September 13, 1974 (aged 27)	cm / kg	39	18				
13	FW	Daiki Takamatsu	September 8, 1981 (aged 20)	cm / kg	33	6				
14	MF	Haruki Seto	March 14, 1978 (aged 23)	cm / kg	24	1				
15	MF	Takashi Umeda	May 30, 1976 (aged 25)	cm / kg	14	1				
16	MF	Keita Kanemoto	July 13, 1977 (aged 24)	cm / kg	27	0				
17	GK	Ryoji Kawamoto	September 25, 1982 (aged 19)	cm / kg	0	0				
18	DF	Yuzo Wada	May 2, 1980 (aged 21)	cm / kg	4	0				
19	FW	Michiaki Kakimoto	October 6, 1977 (aged 24)	cm / kg	14	0				
20	FW	Shota Matsuhashi	August 3, 1982 (aged 19)	cm / kg	9	0				
21	GK	Kenji Koyama	September 5, 1972 (aged 29)	cm / kg	3	0				
22	MF	Kentaro Uramoto	November 13, 1982 (aged 19)	cm / kg	4	0				
23	DF	Koji Arimura	August 25, 1976 (aged 25)	cm / kg	43	3				
24	DF	Tomoya Kanamori	April 2, 1982 (aged 19)	cm / kg	0	0				
25	MF	Kim Sung-Kil	July 8, 1983 (aged 18)	cm / kg	0	0				
26	MF	Marcelo Mattos	February 10, 1984 (aged 18)	cm / kg	1	0				
27	DF	Yuichi Shibakoya	June 16, 1983 (aged 18)	cm / kg	0	0				
28	MF	Tomoaki Komorida	July 10, 1981 (aged 20)	cm / kg	31	4				
29	GK	Koji Ezumi	December 18, 1978 (aged 23)	cm / kg	0	0				
30	FW	Ryosuke Kijima	May 29, 1979 (aged 22)	cm / kg	15	0				

== Other pages ==
- (in Japanese) J. League official site
