= Takahiro Yamazaki (baseball, born 1976) =

Japanese baseball player (born 1976)

- Outfielder
- Born: October 11, 1976 (age 49); Shizuoka City
- Bats: Right Throws: Right

debut
- September 11, 2006, for the Tohoku Rakuten Golden Eagles

Teams
- Tohoku Rakuten Golden Eagles (2006–2009)

Takahiro Yamazaki (山崎 隆広, born October 11, 1976, in Shizuoka City) is a former Japanese professional baseball outfielder for the Tohoku Rakuten Golden Eagles in Japan's Nippon Professional Baseball. He played from 2006 to 2009.

His younger brother Tetsuya is a former Japanese footballer.
