= Andradina (footballer) =

Brazilian footballer (born 1974)

Edi Andradina
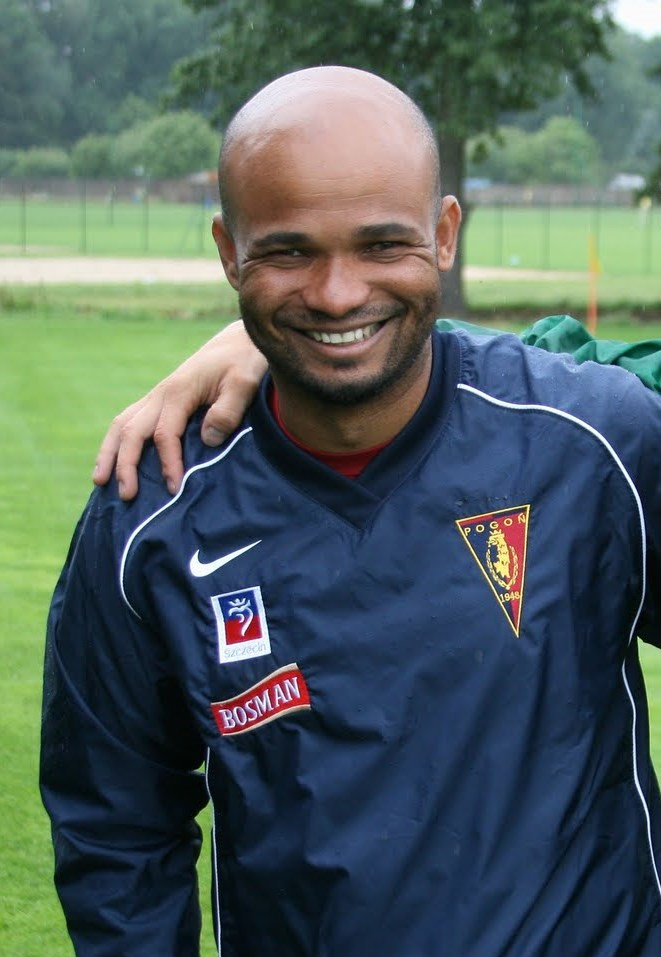
- Andradina with Pogoń Szczecin in 2011

Personal information
- Full name: Edi Carlo Dias Marçal
- Date of birth: 13 September 1974 (age 52)
- Place of birth: Andradina, Brazil
- Height: 1.77 m (5 ft 10 in)
- Position: Striker

Senior career*
Years	Team	Apps	(Gls)
- Santos
1998–1999	Arsenal Tula	78	(45)
2000	Gamba Osaka	14	(3)
2000	Oita Trinita	20	(13)
2001	Albirex Niigata	18	(6)
2002–2003	Oita Trinita	54	(24)
2003	Consadole Sapporo	25	(8)
2004	Santo André		
2005	Portuguesa Santista		
2005–2007	Pogoń Szczecin	70	(22)
2007–2011	Korona Kielce	114	(29)
2011–2013	Pogoń Szczecin	64	(15)
2015–2016	Mewa Resko		
2017	Chemik Police		
2020	KP Piła	1	(0)

Managerial career
- 2013–2014: Pogoń Szczecin II (assistant)
- 2014: Pogoń Szczecin (assistant)
- 2017–2018: Pogoń Szczecin (assistant)
- 2018–2019: Piast Żmigród
- 2021: Pogoń Szczecin (assistant)
- 2022–2023: KP Piła
- * Club domestic league appearances and goals

Edi Carlo Dias Marçal also known as Andradina (born 13 September 1974) is a Brazilian football manager and former player who played as a striker. He most recently managed regional league side KP Piła.

== Career ==
In May 2011, he returned to Pogoń Szczecin on a two-year contract.

== Career statistics ==
Appearances and goals by club, season and competition
Club	Season	League			Emperor's Cup		J.League Cup		Total	
Club	Season	Division	Apps	Goals	Apps	Goals	Apps	Goals	Apps	Goals
Gamba Osaka	2000	J1 League	12	3	0	0	2	0	14	3
Oita Trinita	2000	J2 League	17	9	3	4	0	0	20	13
Albirex Niigata	2001	J2 League	18	6	0	0	0	0	18	6
Oita Trinita	2002	J2 League	39	18	2	4	—		41	22
Oita Trinita	2003	J1 League	10	0	0	0	3	2	13	2
Oita Trinita	Total		49	18	2	4	3	2	54	24
Consadole Sapporo	2003	J2 League	22	6	3	2	0	0	25	8
Career total			118	42	8	10	5	2	131	54

== Honours ==
KP Piła

- Klasa A Greater Poland I: 2020–21

Individual

- Russian First Division top scorer: 1998 (27 goals)
