= Shota Matsuhashi =

Japanese footballer (born 1982)

Shota Matsuhashi 松橋 章太
Personal information
- Full name: Shota Matsuhashi
- Date of birth: August 3, 1982 (age 44)
- Place of birth: Isahaya, Nagasaki, Japan
- Height: 1.71 m (5 ft 7 1/2 in)
- Position: Forward

Youth career
- 1998–2000: Kunimi High School

Senior career*
Years	Team	Apps	(Gls)
2001–2007	Oita Trinita	118	(13)
2008–2009	Vissel Kobe	13	(1)
2010–2011	Roasso Kumamoto	38	(8)
2012–2013	V-Varen Nagasaki	20	(3)
Total		189	(25)
- * Club domestic league appearances and goals

Shota Matsuhashi (松橋 章太, Matsuhashi Shota; born August 3, 1982) is a former Japanese football player.

== Playing career ==
=== Oita Trinita ===
After graduating from high school, he joined J2 League club Oita Trinita in 2001. He played as forward in many matches during his first season. Although Trinita won the champions in the 2002 season and was promoted to J1 League, he could not play many matches during the 2002 season. In 2006, he played many matches and scored 10 goals. In 2007, his younger brother Masaru also joined Trinita. Although Matsuhashi played many matches in 2006, his opportunity to play decreased behind Masato Yamazaki in 2007.

=== Vissel Kobe ===
In 2008, he moved to Vissel Kobe. He scored his first goal for the club against Kawasaki Frontale on 14 March 2009.

=== Roasso Kumamoto ===
In 2010, he moved to J2 club Roasso Kumamoto. He made his debut for Roasso against JEF United on 7 March 2010. He scored his first goal for Roasso a week later on 14 March 2010, scoring in the 59th minute. Although he played as regular forward in 2010, he could hardly play during the 2011 season.

=== V-Varen Nagasaki ===
In 2012, he moved to his local club V-Varen Nagasaki in Japan Football League. V-Varen won the champions in 2012 season and was promoted to J2. However he could hardly play during the 2013 season, and retired at the end of the 2013 season.

== Club statistics ==
Club performance			League		Cup		League Cup		Total	
Season	Club	League	Apps	Goals	Apps	Goals	Apps	Goals	Apps	Goals
Japan			League		Emperor's Cup		J.League Cup		Total	
2001	Oita Trinita	J2 League	25	0	3	1	3	0	31	1
2002	Oita Trinita	J2 League	9	0	3	1	-		12	1
2003	Oita Trinita	J1 League	3	0	1	0	2	0	6	0
2004	Oita Trinita	J1 League	16	1	1	0	4	0	21	1
2005	Oita Trinita	J1 League	10	0	0	0	3	0	13	0
2006	Oita Trinita	J1 League	31	10	2	0	3	1	36	11
2007	Oita Trinita	J1 League	24	2	2	0	4	0	30	2
Total			118	13	12	2	19	1	149	16
2008	Vissel Kobe	J1 League	5	0	0	0	3	0	8	0
2009	Vissel Kobe	J1 League	8	1	0	0	2	0	10	1
Total			13	1	0	0	5	0	18	1
2010	Roasso Kumamoto	J2 League	33	7	1	2	-		34	8
2011	Roasso Kumamoto	J2 League	5	1	1	0	-		6	1
Total			38	8	2	2	-		40	10
2012	V-Varen Nagasaki	Football League	17	3	1	0	-		18	3
2013	V-Varen Nagasaki	J2 League	3	0	0	0	-		3	0
Total			20	3	1	0	-		21	3
Career total			189	25	15	4	24	1	228	30
