= Ryoji Kawamoto =

Japanese footballer (born 1982)

Ryoji Kawamoto 川本 良二
Personal information
- Full name: Ryoji Kawamoto
- Date of birth: September 25, 1982 (age 44)
- Place of birth: Nagoya, Japan
- Height: 1.81 m (5 ft 11 1/2 in)
- Position: Goalkeeper

Youth career
- 1998–2000: Yokkaichi Chuo Technical High School

Senior career*
Years	Team	Apps	(Gls)
2001–2003	Oita Trinita	0	(0)
2004–2006	Ehime FC	20	(0)
2007–2011	Sagawa Printing	69	(0)
2012	Zweigen Kanazawa	0	(0)
Total		89	(0)
- * Club domestic league appearances and goals

Ryoji Kawamoto (川本 良二, Kawamoto Ryoji; born September 25, 1982) is a former Japanese football player.

== Playing career ==
Kawamoto was born in Nagoya on September 25, 1982. After graduating from high school, he joined J2 League club Oita Trinita in 2001. Although Trinita won the champions in 2002 season and was promoted to J1 League, he could not play at all in the match until 2003. In 2004, he moved to Japan Football League (JFL) club Ehime FC. Although he could not play many matches, Ehime won the champions in 2005 season and was promoted to J2 from 2006. In 2006, he played 14 matches in J2. In 2007, he moved to JFL club Sagawa Printing. He played as regular goalkeeper in 2007 season. However his opportunity to play decreased from 2008. In 2012, he moved to JFL club Zweigen Kanazawa. However he could not play at all in the match and retired end of 2012 season.

== Career statistics ==
Appearances and goals by club, season and competition
Club	Season	League			Emperor's Cup		J.League Cup		Total	
Club	Season	Division	Apps	Goals	Apps	Goals	Apps	Goals	Apps	Goals
Oita Trinita	2001	J2 League	0	0	0	0	—		0	0
Oita Trinita	2002	J2 League	0	0	0	0	—		0	0
Oita Trinita	2003	J1 League	0	0	0	0	0	0	0	0
Ehime FC	2004	Football League	6	0	0	0	—		6	0
Ehime FC	2005	Football League	0	0	1	0	—		1	0
Ehime FC	2006	J2 League	14	0	0	0	—		14	0
Sagawa Printing	2007	Football League	30	0	2	0	—		32	0
Sagawa Printing	2008	Football League	13	0	2	0	—		15	0
Sagawa Printing	2009	Football League	8	0	0	0	—		8	0
Sagawa Printing	2010	Football League	15	0	1	0	—		16	0
Sagawa Printing	2011	Football League	3	0	0	0	—		3	0
Zweigen Kanazawa	2012	Football League	0	0	0	0	—		0	0
Career total			89	0	6	0	0	0	95	0
