= Takashi Kuramoto =

Japanese footballer

Takashi Kuramoto 倉本 崇史
Personal information
- Full name: Takashi Kuramoto
- Date of birth: August 8, 1984 (age 42)
- Place of birth: Nakatsu, Oita, Japan
- Height: 1.78 m (5 ft 10 in)
- Position: Defender

Youth career
- 2000–2002: Oita High School

Senior career*
Years	Team	Apps	(Gls)
2003–2005	Oita Trinita	1	(0)
2006–2008	Mito HollyHock	53	(0)
Total		54	(0)
- * Club domestic league appearances and goals

Takashi Kuramoto (倉本 崇史, Kuramoto Takashi; born August 8, 1984) is a former Japanese football player.

== Club statistics ==
Club performance			League		Cup		League Cup		Total	
Season	Club	League	Apps	Goals	Apps	Goals	Apps	Goals	Apps	Goals
Japan			League		Emperor's Cup		J.League Cup		Total	
2003	Oita Trinita	J1 League	0	0	0	0	0	0	0	0
2004	Oita Trinita	J1 League	1	0	0	0	1	0	2	0
2005	Oita Trinita	J1 League	0	0	0	0	1	0	1	0
2006	Mito HollyHock	J2 League	33	0	0	0	-		33	0
2007	Mito HollyHock	J2 League	13	0	1	0	-		14	0
2008	Mito HollyHock	J2 League	7	0	0	0	-		7	0
Total			54	0	1	0	2	0	57	0
