= Yasuhito Morishima =

Japanese footballer (born 1987)

Yasuhito Morishima 森島 康仁
Personal information
- Full name: Yasuhito Morishima
- Date of birth: 18 September 1987 (age 39)
- Place of birth: Kobe, Japan
- Height: 1.88 m (6 ft 2 in)
- Position: Forward

Youth career
- 2000–2002: Cerezo Osaka
- 2003–2005: Takigawa Daini High School

Senior career*
Years	Team	Apps	(Gls)
2006–2008	Cerezo Osaka	44	(7)
2008	→ Oita Trinita (loan)	15	(2)
2008–2013	Oita Trinita	136	(35)
2014–2015	Kawasaki Frontale	12	(2)
2015	Júbilo Iwata	26	(3)
2015–2016	→ Júbilo Iwata (loan)	15	(1)
2017	Tegevajaro Miyazaki	17	(19)
2018	Tochigi Uva FC	18	(17)
2019–2021	Fujieda MYFC	58	(21)

International career
2007	Japan U-20	3	(2)
Medal record
Oita Trinita
Winner	J.League Cup	2008
Representing Japan
AFC U-19 Championship
Silver medal – second place	2006 India
- * Club domestic league appearances and goals as of 31 December 2017

Yasuhito Morishima (森島 康仁, Morishima Yasuhito; born 18 September 1987) is a Japanese football player.

== Club career ==
Morishima was born in Kobe on 18 September 1987. After graduating from high school, he joined Cerezo Osaka in 2006. Although he played many matches in 2007, his opportunity to play decreased in 2008 and he moved to Oita Trinita in July 2008. Although the club was relegated to J2 League from 2010, his opportunity to play increased form 2010. The club was returned to J1 League in 2013. However the club was relegated to J2 in a season and he moved to Kawasaki Frontale in 2014. However he could hardly play in the match and he moved to Júbilo Iwata in 2015. However he could not play many matches behind Jay Bothroyd and he left the club end of 2016 season. He signed with Regional Leagues club Tegevajaro Miyazaki in 2017. The club was promoted to Japan Football League end of the season. He moved to Regional Leagues club Tochigi Uva FC in 2018.

== National team career ==
In July 2007, he was elected Japan U-20 national team for 2007 U-20 World Cup. At this tournament, he played 3 matches and scored 2 goals.

== Career statistics ==
As of 1 March 2017.

Appearances and goals by club, season and competition
Club	Season	League		Cup^{1}		League Cup^{2}		Asia		Other^{3}		Total	
Club	Season	Apps	Goals	Apps	Goals	Apps	Goals	Apps	Goals	Apps	Goals	Apps	Goals
Cerezo Osaka	2006	2	0	0	0	0	0	—		—		2	0
Cerezo Osaka	2007	33	6	2	2	—		—		—		35	8
Cerezo Osaka	2008	9	1	0	0	—		—		—		9	1
Oita Trinita	2008	15	2	0	0	4	0	—		—		19	2
Oita Trinita	2009	9	1	1	0	1	0	—		1	0	12	1
Oita Trinita	2010	25	2	1	0	—		—		—		26	2
Oita Trinita	2011	35	11	2	0	—		—		—		37	11
Oita Trinita	2012	37	14	0	0	—		—		2	4	39	18
Oita Trinita	2013	30	7	3	3	5	1	—		—		38	11
Kawasaki Frontale	2014	12	2	2	1	1	0	3	1	—		18	4
Júbilo Iwata	2015	26	3	2	0	—		—		—		28	3
Júbilo Iwata	2016	15	1	2	1	3	0	—		—		20	2
Tegevajaro Miyazaki	2017	17	19	—		—		—		—		17	19
Career total		265	69	15	7	13	1	3	1	3	4	300	82

^{1}Includes Emperor's Cup.

^{2}Includes J. League Cup.

^{3}Includes Pan-Pacific Championship and Promotion Playoff to J1.

== National team statistics ==
=== Appearances in major competitions ===
Team	Competition	Category	Appearances		Goals	Team record
Team	Competition	Category	Start	Sub	Goals	Team record
Japan	AFC Youth Championship 2006 Qualification	U-18	2	0	1	Qualified
Japan	AFC Youth Championship 2006	U-19	6	0	3	Ruuner-up
Japan	FIFA U-20 World Cup 2007	U-20	3	0	2	Round of 16
Japan	2008 Olympics Qualification	U-22	2	1	0	Qualified

== Honours ==
=== Club ===
Oita Trinita

- J.League Cup (1) : 2008
