= Yuichi Shibakoya =

Japanese footballer

Yuichi Shibakoya 柴小屋 雄一
Personal information
- Full name: Yuichi Shibakoya
- Date of birth: June 16, 1983 (age 43)
- Place of birth: Sendai, Japan
- Height: 1.87 m (6 ft 1 1/2 in)
- Position: Defender

Youth career
- 1999–2001: Narashino High School

Senior career*
| Years | Team | Apps | (Gls) |
| 2002–2010 | Oita Trinita | 22 | (1) |
| 2004 | → Mito HollyHock (loan) | 39 | (0) |
| 2007–2008 | → Sagan Tosu (loan) | 56 | (1) |
| 2009 | → Ehime FC (loan) | 31 | (1) |
| 2010–2011 | Pelita Jaya | 12 | (0) |
| 2011–2012 | Persiwa Wamena | 42 | (3) |
| Total | | 202 | (6) |
- * Club domestic league appearances and goals

Yuichi Shibakoya (柴小屋 雄一, Shibakoya Yuichi; born June 16, 1983) is a former Japanese football player.

== Playing career ==
Shibakoya was born in Sendai on June 16, 1983. After graduating from high school, he joined J2 League club Oita Trinita in 2002. Although Trinita won the champions in 2002 season and was promoted to J1 League, he could not play at all in the match until 2003. In 2004, he was loaned to J2 club Mito HollyHock. He became a regular center back. In 2005, he returned to Trinita. Although he played many matches as center back in 2005, he could hardly play in the match from 2006. In April 2007, he moved to J2 club Sagan Tosu on loan. He played many matches as regular center back in 2 seasons. In 2009, he moved to J2 club Ehime FC on loan and played many matches. In 2010, he returned to Trinita which was relegated to J2 from 2010. However he could hardly play in the match. In September 2010, he moved to Indonesia and played for Pelita Jaya and Persiwa Wamena. He retired end of 2011–12 season.

== Club statistics ==
| Club performance | | | League | | Cup | | League Cup | | Total | |
| Season | Club | League | Apps | Goals | Apps | Goals | Apps | Goals | Apps | Goals |
| Japan | | | League | | Emperor's Cup | | J.League Cup | | Total | |
|---|---|---|---|---|---|---|---|---|---|---|
| 2002 | Oita Trinita | J2 League | 0 | 0 | 0 | 0 | - | | 0 | 0 |
| 2003 | Oita Trinita | J1 League | 0 | 0 | 0 | 0 | 0 | 0 | 0 | 0 |
| Total | | | 0 | 0 | 0 | 0 | 0 | 0 | 0 | 0 |
| 2004 | Mito HollyHock | J2 League | 39 | 0 | 2 | 0 | - | | 41 | 0 |
| Total | | | 39 | 0 | 2 | 0 | - | | 41 | 0 |
| 2005 | Oita Trinita | J1 League | 18 | 0 | 0 | 0 | 5 | 0 | 23 | 0 |
| 2006 | Oita Trinita | J1 League | 3 | 1 | 0 | 0 | 0 | 0 | 3 | 1 |
| 2007 | Oita Trinita | J1 League | 0 | 0 | 0 | 0 | 0 | 0 | 0 | 0 |
| Total | | | 21 | 1 | 0 | 0 | 5 | 0 | 26 | 1 |
| 2007 | Sagan Tosu | J2 League | 30 | 0 | 1 | 0 | - | | 31 | 0 |
| 2008 | Sagan Tosu | J2 League | 26 | 1 | 2 | 0 | - | | 28 | 1 |
| Total | | | 56 | 1 | 3 | 0 | - | | 59 | 1 |
| 2009 | Ehime FC | J2 League | 31 | 1 | 0 | 0 | - | | 31 | 1 |
| Total | | | 31 | 1 | 0 | 0 | - | | 31 | 1 |
| 2010 | Oita Trinita | J2 League | 1 | 0 | 0 | 0 | - | | 1 | 0 |
| Total | | | 1 | 0 | 0 | 0 | - | | 1 | 0 |
| Indonesia | | | League | | Piala Indonesia | | League Cup | | Total | |
| 2010/11 | Pelita Jaya | Super League | 12 | 0 | - | | - | | 12 | 0 |
| Total | | | 12 | 0 | - | | - | | 12 | 0 |
| 2010/11 | Persiwa Wamena | Super League | 11 | 1 | - | | - | | 11 | 1 |
| 2011/12 | Persiwa Wamena | Super League | 31 | 2 | - | | - | | 31 | 2 |
| Total | | | 42 | 3 | - | | - | | 42 | 3 |
| Career total | | | 202 | 6 | 5 | 0 | 5 | 0 | 212 | 6 |

== Honours ==
=== Club honors ===
Oita Trinita

- J2 League (1): 2002
