= Taikai Uemoto =

Japanese footballer

Taikai Uemoto 上本 大海
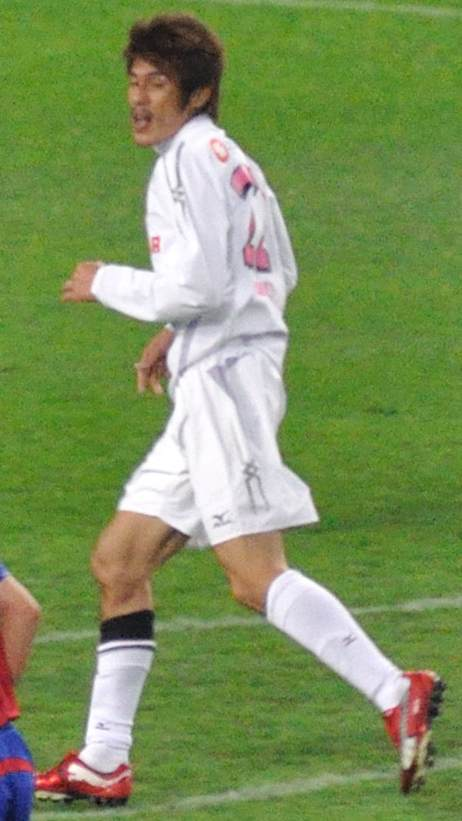

Personal information
- Full name: Taikai Uemoto
- Date of birth: June 1, 1982 (age 44)
- Place of birth: Ibusuki, Kagoshima, Japan
- Height: 1.80 m (5 ft 11 in)
- Position: Defender

Youth career
- 1998–2000: Kagoshima Jitsugyo High School

Senior career*
Years	Team	Apps	(Gls)
2001–2004	Júbilo Iwata	6	(0)
2005–2009	Oita Trinita	127	(2)
2010–2011	Cerezo Osaka	58	(1)
2012–2015	Vegalta Sendai	39	(1)
2016	V-Varen Nagasaki	5	(0)
2017	Kagoshima United FC	22	(1)
Total		257	(5)
Medal record
Júbilo Iwata
Winner	J1 League	2002
Runner-up	J1 League	2001
Runner-up	J1 League	2003
Runner-up	J.League Cup	2001
Winner	Emperor's Cup	2003
Runner-up	Emperor's Cup	2004
Oita Trinita
Winner	J.League Cup	2008
Vegalta Sendai
Runner-up	J1 League	2012
- * Club domestic league appearances and goals

Taikai Uemoto (上本 大海, Uemoto Taikai; born June 1, 1982) is a former Japanese football player.

== Playing career ==
Uemoto was born in Ibusuki on June 1, 1982. After graduating from high school, he joined J1 League club Júbilo Iwata in 2001. However he could hardly play in the match in the club have many Japan national team players Hideto Suzuki, Makoto Tanaka and so on. In 2005, he moved to J1 club Oita Trinita. He became a regular player as left back of three backs defense and played many matches for a long time. The club won the champions 2008 J.League Cup first major title in the club history. However the club was relegated to J2 League end of 2009 season and he was released from the club due to their financial problems. In 2010, he moved to J1 club Cerezo Osaka. He played many matches as regular center back with Teruyuki Moniwa. In 2012, he moved to J1 club Vegalta Sendai. He played as regular center back with Jiro Kamata in 2012. However he could not play many matches for injuries from 2013. In 2016, he moved to J2 club V-Varen Nagasaki. However he could hardly play in the match. In 2017, he moved to J3 League club Kagoshima United FC based in his local. He played many matches and retired end of 2017 season.

== Career statistics ==
Appearances and goals by club, season and competition
Club	Season	League			Emperor's Cup		J.League Cup		Asia		Total	
Club	Season	Division	Apps	Goals	Apps	Goals	Apps	Goals	Apps	Goals	Apps	Goals
Júbilo Iwata	2001	J1 League	0	0	0	0	0	0	3	0	3	0
Júbilo Iwata	2002	J1 League	1	0	0	0	1	0	—		2	0
Júbilo Iwata	2003	J1 League	5	0	1	0	2	0	—		8	0
Júbilo Iwata	2004	J1 League	0	0	0	0	0	0	1	0	1	0
Oita Trinita	2005	J1 League	14	0	2	0	0	0	—		16	0
Oita Trinita	2006	J1 League	25	0	2	0	2	0	—		29	0
Oita Trinita	2007	J1 League	29	0	1	0	4	0	—		34	0
Oita Trinita	2008	J1 League	31	2	0	0	11	1	—		42	3
Oita Trinita	2009	J1 League	28	0	2	0	6	0	—		36	0
Cerezo Osaka	2010	J1 League	33	0	2	0	4	0	—		39	0
Cerezo Osaka	2011	J1 League	25	1	4	0	0	0	7	0	36	1
Vegalta Sendai	2012	J1 League	22	1	1	0	2	0	–		25	1
Vegalta Sendai	2013	J1 League	0	0	0	0	0	0	–		0	0
Vegalta Sendai	2014	J1 League	15	0	0	0	1	0	–		16	0
Vegalta Sendai	2015	J1 League	2	0	1	0	1	0	–		4	0
V-Varen Nagasaki	2016	J2 League	5	0	1	0	–		–		6	0
Kagoshima United FC	2017	J3 League	22	1	2	0	–		–		24	1
Career total			257	5	19	0	34	1	11	0	321	6
