= Hiroyuki Kobayashi (footballer) =

Japanese footballer

Hiroyuki Kobayashi 小林 宏之
Personal information
- Full name: Hiroyuki Kobayashi
- Date of birth: April 18, 1980 (age 46)
- Place of birth: Sapporo, Hokkaido, Japan
- Height: 1.80 m (5 ft 11 in)
- Position: Defender

Youth career
- 1996–1998: Shimizu Commercial High School

College career
Years	Team	Apps	(Gls)
1999–2002	University of Tsukuba		

Senior career*
Years	Team	Apps	(Gls)
2003–2004	Urawa Reds	4	(0)
2005	Kawasaki Frontale	0	(0)
2006	Yokohama FC	16	(0)
2007	Fervorosa Ishikawa Hakuzan FC	13	(1)
2007	TDK	8	(0)
2008–2010	Oita Trinita	41	(0)
2011–2012	Blaublitz Akita	42	(0)
Total		124	(1)
Medal record
Urawa Reds
Runner-up	J1 League	2004
Winner	J.League Cup	2003
Runner-up	J.League Cup	2004
Oita Trinita
Winner	J.League Cup	2008
- * Club domestic league appearances and goals

Hiroyuki Kobayashi (小林 宏之, Kobayashi Hiroyuki; born April 18, 1980) is a Japanese former footballer.

== Playing career ==
Kobayashi was born in Sapporo on April 18, 1980. After graduating from University of Tsukuba, he joined J1 League club Urawa Reds in 2003. He played 3 matches in a row as center back from opening game in first season. However he could hardly play in the match after that. In 2005, he moved to Kawasaki Frontale. However he could not play at all in the match. In 2006, he moved to J2 League club Yokohama FC. He played many matches as regular player in summer. In 2007, he moved to Regional Leagues club Fervorosa Ishikawa Hakuzan FC. In July 2007, he moved to Japan Football League (JFL) club TDK (later Blaublitz Akita). In 2008, he moved to J1 club Oita Trinita. He played many matches and Trinita won the champions in 2008 J.League Cup first major title in the club history. However Trinita was relegated to J2 end of 2009 season. In 2011, he moved to JFL club Blaublitz Akita for the first time in 3 years. Although he played many matches as regular player in 2011, his opportunity to play decreased in 2012 and he retired end of 2012 season.

== Club statistics ==
Club performance			League		Cup		League Cup		Total	
Season	Club	League	Apps	Goals	Apps	Goals	Apps	Goals	Apps	Goals
Japan			League		Emperor's Cup		J.League Cup		Total	
2003	Urawa Reds	J1 League	3	0	0	0	3	0	6	0
2004	Urawa Reds	J1 League	1	0	0	0	0	0	1	0
2005	Kawasaki Frontale	J1 League	0	0	0	0	0	0	0	0
2006	Yokohama FC	J2 League	16	0	1	0	-		17	0
2007	Fervorosa Ishikawa Hakuzan FC	Regional Leagues	13	1	-		-		13	1
2007	TDK	Football League	8	0	4	0	-		12	0
2008	Oita Trinita	J1 League	13	0	1	0	8	1	22	1
2009	Oita Trinita	J1 League	14	0	0	0	2	0	16	0
2010	Oita Trinita	J2 League	14	0	0	0	-		14	0
2011	Blaublitz Akita	Football League	28	0	2	0	-		30	0
2012	Blaublitz Akita	Football League	14	0	0	0	-		14	0
Career total			124	1	8	0	13	1	145	2
