= Seigo Shimokawa =

Japanese footballer

Seigo Shimokawa 下川 誠吾
Personal information
- Full name: Seigo Shimokawa
- Date of birth: November 17, 1975 (age 51)
- Place of birth: Amagasaki, Japan
- Height: 1.84 m (6 ft 1/2 in)
- Position: Goalkeeper

Youth career
- 1991–1993: Hokuyo High School
- 1994–1995: Momoyama Gakuin University

Senior career*
Years	Team	Apps	(Gls)
1996–2003	Cerezo Osaka	171	(0)
2004–2005	Kawasaki Frontale	6	(0)
2006–2010	Oita Trinita	65	(0)
Total		242	(0)
Medal record
Cerezo Osaka
Runner-up	Emperor's Cup	2001
Runner-up	Emperor's Cup	2003
Oita Trinita
Winner	J.League Cup	2008
- * Club domestic league appearances and goals

Seigo Shimokawa (下川 誠吾, Shimokawa Seigo; born November 17, 1975) is a former Japanese football player.

== Playing career ==
Shimokawa was born in Amagasaki on November 17, 1975. After dropped out from Momoyama Gakuin University, he joined J1 League club Cerezo Osaka in 1996. Although he could not play at all in the match behind Gilmar Rinaldi, he became a regular goalkeeper from July 1997. He played many matches as regular goalkeeper for a long time and the club won the 2nd place 2001 and 2003 Emperor's Cup. However his opportunity to play decreased behind young goalkeeper Daisuke Tada in 2003. In 2004, he moved to Kawasaki Frontale. However he could hardly play in the match behind Shinya Yoshihara and Takashi Aizawa. In 2006, he moved to Oita Trinita. He battles with Shusaku Nishikawa for the position. Although he could hardly play in the match behind in 2006, he played many matches for Nishikawa's injury and poor performance in 2007 and 2008. The club also won the champions 2008 J.League Cup first major title in the club history. However he could hardly play in the match in 2009 and the club was relegated to J2 League. The club released many players including Nishikawa end of 2009 season due to their financial problems. In 2010, although he played as regular goalkeeper, his opportunity to play decreased behind young goalkeeper Keisuke Shimizu and he retired end of 2010 season.

== Career statistics ==
Appearances and goals by club, season and competition
Club	Season	League			Emperor's Cup		J.League Cup		Total	
Club	Season	Division	Apps	Goals	Apps	Goals	Apps	Goals	Apps	Goals
Cerezo Osaka	1996	J1 League	0	0	0	0	0	0	0	0
Cerezo Osaka	1997	J1 League	17	0	2	0	0	0	19	0
Cerezo Osaka	1998	J1 League	34	0	1	0	2	0	37	0
Cerezo Osaka	1999	J1 League	30	0	2	0	2	0	34	0
Cerezo Osaka	2000	J1 League	30	0	1	0	0	0	31	0
Cerezo Osaka	2001	J1 League	17	0	5	0	0	0	22	0
Cerezo Osaka	2002	J2 League	32	0	4	0	—		36	0
Cerezo Osaka	2003	J1 League	11	0	5	0	3	0	19	0
Kawasaki Frontale	2004	J2 League	3	0	2	0	—		5	0
Kawasaki Frontale	2005	J1 League	3	0	0	0	2	0	5	0
Oita Trinita	2006	J1 League	5	0	1	0	1	0	7	0
Oita Trinita	2007	J1 League	23	0	0	0	4	0	27	0
Oita Trinita	2008	J1 League	13	0	0	0	6	0	19	0
Oita Trinita	2009	J1 League	0	0	1	0	3	0	4	0
Oita Trinita	2010	J2 League	24	0	1	0	—		25	0
Career total			242	0	25	0	23	0	290	0
