= 2013 Oita Trinita season =

Oita Trinita
2013 season
- Manager: Kazuaki Tasaka
- Stadium: Oita Bank Dome
- J1 League: 18th

2013 Oita Trinita season.

== J1 League ==
Match	Date	Team	Score	Team	Venue	Attendance
1	2013.03.02	Oita Trinita	1-2	FC Tokyo	Oita Bank Dome	17,055
2	2013.03.09	Kawasaki Frontale	1-1	Oita Trinita	Tokyo National Stadium	21,657
3	2013.03.16	Oita Trinita	2-2	Urawa Reds	Oita Bank Dome	16,510
4	2013.03.30	Kashiwa Reysol	3-1	Oita Trinita	Hitachi Kashiwa Stadium	9,144
5	2013.04.06	Oita Trinita	0-1	Ventforet Kofu	Oita Bank Dome	7,913
6	2013.04.13	Oita Trinita	2-3	Kashima Antlers	Oita Bank Dome	10,571
7	2013.04.20	Shonan Bellmare	2-1	Oita Trinita	Shonan BMW Stadium Hiratsuka	6,301
8	2013.04.27	Cerezo Osaka	0-0	Oita Trinita	Kincho Stadium	14,037
9	2013.05.03	Oita Trinita	0-2	Omiya Ardija	Oita Bank Dome	11,334
10	2013.05.06	Oita Trinita	2-4	Sagan Tosu	Oita Bank Dome	16,760
11	2013.05.11	Sanfrecce Hiroshima	1-0	Oita Trinita	Edion Stadium Hiroshima	10,708
12	2013.05.18	Albirex Niigata	2-3	Oita Trinita	Tohoku Denryoku Big Swan Stadium	25,279
13	2013.05.25	Oita Trinita	1-1	Júbilo Iwata	Oita Bank Dome	11,141
14	2013.07.06	Yokohama F. Marinos	1-1	Oita Trinita	NHK Spring Mitsuzawa Football Stadium	12,537
15	2013.07.10	Oita Trinita	0-1	Vegalta Sendai	Oita Bank Dome	7,067
16	2013.07.13	Shimizu S-Pulse	3-1	Oita Trinita	IAI Stadium Nihondaira	15,191
17	2013.07.17	Oita Trinita	1-2	Nagoya Grampus	Oita Bank Dome	7,104
18	2013.07.31	Sagan Tosu	3-2	Oita Trinita	Best Amenity Stadium	10,304
19	2013.08.03	FC Tokyo	2-0	Oita Trinita	Ajinomoto Stadium	22,309
20	2013.08.10	Oita Trinita	0-0	Kashiwa Reysol	Oita Bank Dome	23,814
21	2013.08.17	Urawa Reds	4-3	Oita Trinita	Saitama Stadium 2002	32,329
22	2013.08.24	Oita Trinita	1-1	Sanfrecce Hiroshima	Oita Bank Dome	13,024
23	2013.08.28	Nagoya Grampus	2-1	Oita Trinita	Nagoya Mizuho Athletic Stadium	9,777
24	2013.08.31	Oita Trinita	2-3	Shimizu S-Pulse	Oita Bank Dome	9,108
25	2013.09.14	Vegalta Sendai	6-0	Oita Trinita	Yurtec Stadium Sendai	13,411
26	2013.09.21	Oita Trinita	1-2	Shonan Bellmare	Oita Bank Dome	8,520
27	2013.09.28	Kashima Antlers	3-1	Oita Trinita	Kashima Soccer Stadium	13,020
28	2013.10.05	Oita Trinita	0-2	Cerezo Osaka	Oita Bank Dome	11,045
29	2013.10.19	Omiya Ardija	0-1	Oita Trinita	Kumagaya Athletic Stadium	9,469
30	2013.10.27	Oita Trinita	0-1	Yokohama F. Marinos	Oita Bank Dome	12,913
31	2013.11.10	Oita Trinita	1-3	Albirex Niigata	Oita Bank Dome	8,039
32	2013.11.23	Ventforet Kofu	0-0	Oita Trinita	Yamanashi Chuo Bank Stadium	11,514
33	2013.11.30	Oita Trinita	0-1	Kawasaki Frontale	Oita Bank Dome	10,639
34	2013.12.07	Júbilo Iwata	3-1	Oita Trinita	Yamaha Stadium	8,534
