= Moabe Platini =

Brazilian footballer

Personal information
- Full name: Moabe Platini Dias Ramos
- Date of birth: 22 June 1987 (age 39)
- Place of birth: São Paulo, Brazil
- Height: 1.75 m (5 ft 9 in)
- Position: Midfielder

Senior career*
Years	Team	Apps	(Gls)
2003–2006	União São João		
2006–2007	Oita Trinita	4	(0)
2007	MIO Biwako Kusatsu		
2008	São Carlos		
2009–2010	Chernomorets Burgas	3	(3)
- * Club domestic league appearances and goals

Moabe Platini Dias Ramos (born 22 June 1987) is a Brazilian football player.

== Club statistics ==
Club performance			League		Cup		League Cup		Total	
Season	Club	League	Apps	Goals	Apps	Goals	Apps	Goals	Apps	Goals
Japan			League		Emperor's Cup		League Cup		Total	
2006	Oita Trinita	J1 League	0	0	0	0	0	0	0	0
2007	Oita Trinita	J1 League	4	0	0	0	1	0	5	0
2007	MIO Biwako Kusatsu	Regional Leagues	4	0	0	0	-		4	0
Total	Japan		8	0	0	0	1	0	9	0
Career total			8	0	0	0	1	0	9	0
