= Choi Jung-han =

South Korean footballer (born 1989)

Personal information
- Full name: Choi Jung-han
- Date of birth: 3 June 1989 (age 37)
- Place of birth: Incheon, South Korea
- Height: 1.79 m (5 ft 10 1/2 in)
- Position: Striker

Team information
- Current team: Navy
- Number: 9

Youth career
- 2008–2009: Yonsei University

Senior career*
Years	Team	Apps	(Gls)
2009–2014	Oita Trinita	134	(19)
2014–2015	FC Seoul	7	(1)
2016–2018	Daegu FC	26	(1)
2019–	Navy	0	(0)

International career^{‡}
2008–2009	South Korea U20	15	(4)
2011	South Korea U23	1	(0)
- * Club domestic league appearances and goals as of 1 November 2016 ‡ National team caps and goals as of 3 July 2014

- Choi Jung-han
- Hangul: 최정한
- Hanja: 崔正漢
- RR: Choe Jeonghan
- MR: Ch'oe Chŏnghan

Choi Jung-han (Korean: 최정한; born 3 June 1989, in Incheon) is a South Korean football forward who plays for Navy.

== Career ==
=== Oita Trinita ===
He started his professional football career in J1 League side Oita Trinita since 2009.

Choi made his debut on 3 October 2009 against Montedio Yamagata after coming on as a substitute at the 89 minute.

=== FC Seoul ===
On 6 July 2014, he joined FC Seoul.

== Club statistics ==
As of 27 January 2011

Club performance			League		Cup		League Cup		Total	
Season	Club	League	Apps	Goals	Apps	Goals	Apps	Goals	Apps	Goals
Japan			League		Emperor's Cup		League Cup		Total	
2009	Oita Trinita	J1 League	4	0	0	0	0	0	4	0
2010	Oita Trinita	J2 League	30	8	0	0	-		30	8
2011	Oita Trinita	J2 League					-			
Career total			34	8	0	0	0	0	34	8
