= Tatsuya Ikeda =

Japanese footballer

Personal information
- Full name: Tatsuya Ikeda
- Date of birth: May 18, 1988 (age 38)
- Place of birth: Inagawa, Hyōgo, Japan]
- Height: 1.84 m (6 ft 1/2 in)
- Position: Defender

Team information
- Current team: Verspah Oita
- Number: 4

Youth career
- 2004–2006: Gamba Osaka

Senior career*
| Years | Team | Apps | (Gls) |
| 2007–2011 | Oita Trinita | 26 | (0) |
| 2012–2015 | Sagawa Printing | 61 | (4) |
| 2016– | Verspah Oita | | |
| Total | | 87 | (4) |
Medal record
Oita Trinita
| Winner | J.League Cup | 2008 |
- * Club domestic league appearances and goals

Tatsuya Ikeda (池田 達哉, Ikeda Tatsuya; born May 18, 1988) is a Japanese football player. He plays for Verspah Oita.

== Club statistics ==
| Club performance | | | League | | Cup | | League Cup | | Total | |
| Season | Club | League | Apps | Goals | Apps | Goals | Apps | Goals | Apps | Goals |
| Japan | | | League | | Emperor's Cup | | League Cup | | Total | |
|---|---|---|---|---|---|---|---|---|---|---|
| 2007 | Oita Trinita | J1 League | 0 | 0 | 0 | 0 | 0 | 0 | 0 | 0 |
| 2008 | Oita Trinita | J1 League | 0 | 0 | 1 | 0 | 1 | 0 | 2 | 0 |
| 2009 | Oita Trinita | J1 League | 0 | 0 | 0 | 0 | 0 | 0 | 0 | 0 |
| 2010 | Oita Trinita | J2 League | 10 | 0 | 0 | 0 | - | | 10 | 0 |
| 2011 | Oita Trinita | J2 League | | | | | - | | | |
| Career total | | | 10 | 0 | 1 | 0 | 1 | 0 | 12 | 0 |
