= Shunsuke Maeda =

Japanese footballer

Shunsuke Maeda 前田 俊介
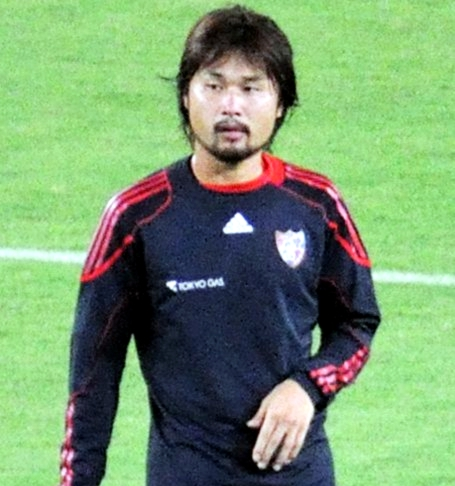

Personal information
- Full name: Shunsuke Maeda
- Date of birth: June 9, 1986 (age 40)
- Place of birth: Sakurai, Nara, Japan
- Height: 1.73 m (5 ft 8 in)
- Position: Forward

Team information
- Current team: Okinawa SV
- Number: 11

Youth career
- 2002–2004: Sanfrecce Hiroshima

Senior career*
Years	Team	Apps	(Gls)
2005–2007	Sanfrecce Hiroshima	45	(7)
2007–2011	Oita Trinita	74	(11)
2010	→ FC Tokyo (loan)	6	(0)
2012–2015	Consadole Sapporo	89	(9)
2016–2017	Gainare Tottori	41	(5)
2018–2022	Okinawa SV	34	(8)
Total		289	(40)

International career
2005	Japan U-20	2	(1)
Medal record
Sanfrecce Hiroshima
Runner-up	Emperor's Cup	2007
Oita Trinita
Winner	J.League Cup	2008
- * Club domestic league appearances and goals as of 6 January 2023

Shunsuke Maeda (前田 俊介, Maeda Shunsuke; born June 9, 1986) is a retired Japanese football player. He was the assistant manager of Japan Football League club Okinawa SV until January 6th of 2023, when he joined Diablossa Takeda FC as a top coach.

== National team career ==
In June 2005, Maeda was selected Japan U-20 national team for 2005 World Youth Championship. At this tournament, he played 2 matches and scored a goal against Australia.

== Club statistics ==
Updated to 23 February 2020.

Club performance			League		Cup		League Cup		Total	
Season	Club	League	Apps	Goals	Apps	Goals	Apps	Goals	Apps	Goals
Japan			League		Emperor's Cup		J.League Cup		Total	
2004	Sanfrecce Hiroshima	J1 League	11	1	1	0	2	0	14	1
2005	Sanfrecce Hiroshima	J1 League	26	5	2	0	1	0	29	5
2006	Sanfrecce Hiroshima	J1 League	8	1	0	0	1	0	9	1
2007	Sanfrecce Hiroshima	J1 League	0	0	0	0	0	0	0	0
2007	Oita Trinita	J1 League	10	1	0	0	0	0	10	1
2008	Oita Trinita	J1 League	15	2	0	0	6	1	21	3
2009	Oita Trinita	J1 League	8	0	1	0	4	2	13	2
2010	Oita Trinita	J2 League	11	0	0	0	-		11	0
2010	FC Tokyo	J1 League	6	0	3	0	0	0	9	0
2011	Oita Trinita	J2 League	30	8	1	0	-		31	8
2012	Consadole Sapporo	J1 League	14	1	1	0	2	1	17	2
2013	Consadole Sapporo	J2 League	36	4	3	0	-		39	4
2014	Consadole Sapporo	J2 League	31	4	2	0	-		33	4
2015	Consadole Sapporo	J2 League	8	0	2	1	-		10	1
2016	Gainare Tottori	J3 League	16	1	2	1	-		18	2
2017	Gainare Tottori	J3 League	25	4	1	0	-		26	4
2018	Okinawa SV	JRL (Kyushu)	18	4	-		-		18	4
2019	Okinawa SV	JRL (Kyushu)	16	4	2	0	-		18	4
Career total			289	40	21	2	16	4	326	46
