= Péricles Chamusca =

Brazilian association football manager

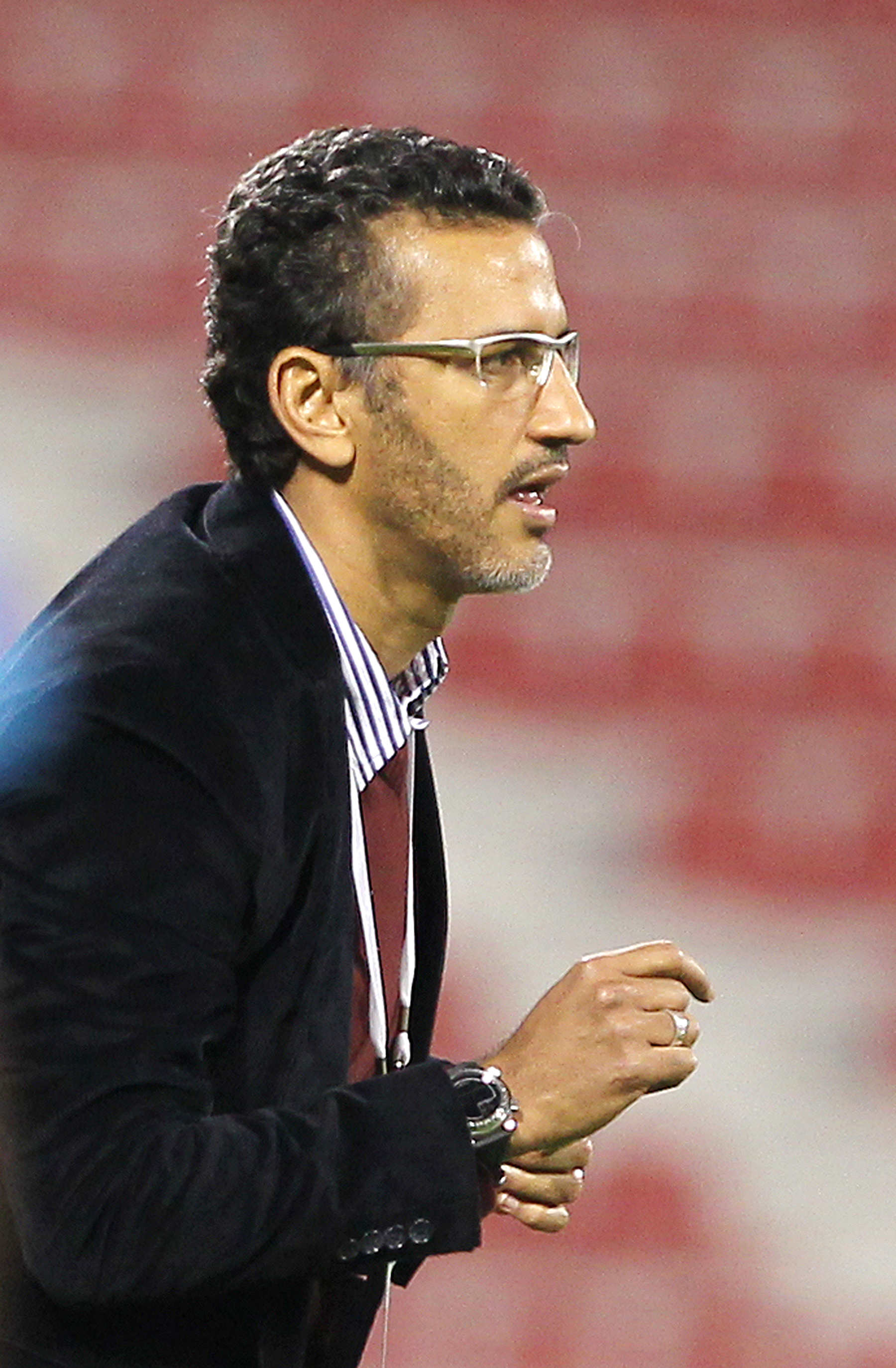
- Chamusca with El Jaish in 2012

Personal information
- Full name: Péricles Raimundo Oliveira Chamusca
- Date of birth: 29 September 1965 (age 61)
- Place of birth: Salvador, Brazil

Team information
- Current team: Al Wahda (head coach)

Managerial career
- Years: Team
- 1994–1995: Vitória
- 1996: Santa Cruz
- 1997: Mirassol
- 1997: Rio Branco-SP
- 1997: América de Natal
- 1998: Porto
- 1998: CSA
- 2001: Corinthians Alagoano
- 2001: Vitória
- 2002: Confiança
- 2002: Brasiliense
- 2002: Caxias
- 2002–2004: Santa Cruz
- 2004: Santo André
- 2004: São Caetano
- 2005: Goiás
- 2005: Botafogo
- 2005–2009: Oita Trinita
- 2009: Sport
- 2010: Avaí
- 2010–2011: Al-Arabi
- 2011–2012: El Jaish
- 2013: Portuguesa
- 2013: Coritiba
- 2014: Júbilo Iwata
- 2015: Al-Gharafa
- 2016–2017: Al Shaab
- 2018–2019: Al-Faisaly
- 2019: Al-Hilal
- 2019–2021: Al-Faisaly
- 2021–2022: Al-Shabab
- 2022–2024: Al-Taawoun
- 2024–2025: Neom
- 2025–2026: Al-Taawoun
- 2026–: Al Wahda

Péricles Raimundo Oliveira Chamusca (born 29 September 1965) is a Brazilian football manager. He is the current head coach of the UAE Pro League club Al Wahda.

== Early and personal life ==
Chamusca and his brother Marcelo Chamusca, who is also a coach, were born in Salvador, Bahia, Brazil.

== Coaching career ==
Chamusca coached Japanese club Oita Trinita since September 2005, then brought the first J.League Cup title to the club in 2008. But in the very next season, the club suffered a 14th straight defeat in the league due to injuries of regular players. He was fired on July 14, and Ranko Popović took his position.

On July 31 2009, he assigned with Sport to coach the Pernambucano team. He replaced Emerson Leão. On November 7 2009, the coach quit Sport in agreement with the club chairman Sílvio Guimarães, the team placed the bottom in the Brasileirão championship standings.

On 29 June 2022, Chamusca was appointed as manager of Al-Taawoun.

On 29 May 2024, Chamusca was appointed as manager of First Division side Neom. He guided the club to victory in the Saudi First Division, achieving their first-ever promotion to the Saudi Pro League, before departing on 3 July 2025. In the meantime, it was announced that he would return to Al-Taawoun, with his reappointment set for 20 July.

In June 2026, Chamusca became the head coach of the UAE Pro League club Al Wahda.

== Managerial statistics ==
As of 2 October 2026

Team	From	To	Record				
Team	From	To	G	W	D	L	Win %
(Brazil) Vitória	1 January 1994	31 December 1995	133	63	34	36	47.37
(Brazil) Santa Cruz	1 January 1996	31 December 1996	48	29	11	8	60.42
(Brazil) Mirassol	1 January 1997	17 March 1997	6	4	2	0	66.67
(Brazil) Rio Branco-SP	19 March 1997	18 May 1997	13	5	3	5	38.46
(Brazil) América de Natal	24 May 1997	23 December 1997	25	7	9	9	28.00
(Brazil) Porto-PE	1998	1998	28	6	7	15	21.43
(Brazil) CSA	1998	1998	10	6	0	4	60.00
(Brazil) Corinthians Alagoano	1 March 2001	30 May 2001	14	5	7	2	35.71
(Brazil) Vitória	1 July 2001	31 December 2001	27	9	9	9	33.33
(Brazil) Confiança	8 January 2002	23 March 2002	11	1	2	8	9.09
(Brazil) Brasiliense	30 March 2002	18 June 2002	14	7	3	4	50.00
(Brazil) Caxias	10 July 2002	20 September 2002	12	3	4	5	25.00
(Brazil) Santa Cruz	6 October 2002	30 April 2004	96	50	19	27	52.08
(Brazil) Santo André	1 May 2004	20 July 2004	17	8	6	3	47.06
(Brazil) São Caetano	21 July 2004	21 December 2004	32	17	6	9	53.13
(Brazil) Goiás	1 January 2005	24 April 2005	22	11	8	3	50.00
(Brazil) Botafogo	1 July 2005	28 August 2005	13	4	3	6	30.77
(Japan) Oita Trinita	5 September 2005	13 July 2009	169	66	35	68	39.05
(Brazil) Sport	31 July 2009	7 November 2009	19	4	5	10	21.05
(Brazil) Avaí	10 December 2009	1 July 2010	31	17	8	6	54.84
(Qatar) Al-Arabi	7 July 2010	3 June 2011	40	22	8	10	55.00
(Qatar) El-Jaish	15 June 2011	30 May 2012	34	16	8	10	47.06
(Brazil) Portuguesa	13 December 2012	15 April 2013	22	14	4	4	63.64
(Brazil) Coritiba	30 September 2013	16 November 2013	12	3	1	8	25.00
(Japan) Júbilo Iwata	1 February 2014	24 September 2014	36	18	8	10	50.00
(Qatar) Al-Gharafa	25 May 2015	19 November 2015	8	3	2	3	37.50
(United Arab Emirates) Al-Shaab	21 December 2016	1 May 2017	17	4	8	5	23.53
(Saudi Arabia) Al-Faisaly	14 October 2018	31 May 2021	93	41	23	29	44.09
(Saudi Arabia) Al-Hilal (loan)	27 April 2019	20 May 2019	5	3	1	1	60.00
(Saudi Arabia) Al-Shabab	1 June 2021	23 March 2022	27	15	8	4	55.56
(Saudi Arabia) Al-Taawoun	29 June 2022	28 May 2024	68	34	18	16	50.00
(Saudi Arabia) Neom	29 May 2024	3 July 2025	34	24	7	3	70.59
(Saudi Arabia) Al-Taawoun	20 July 2025	30 June 2026	36	16	9	11	44.44
(United Arab Emirates) Al Wahda	1 July 2026	present	8	4	0	4	50.00
Total			1,180	537	286	357	45.51

== Honours ==
=== Managerial ===
Vitória

- Campeonato Baiano: 1995

CSA

- Campeonato Alagoano: 1999

Santo André

- Copa do Brasil: 2004

Oita Trinita

- J. League Cup: 2008

Avaí

- Campeonato Catarinense: 2010

Al-Arabi

- Sheikh Jassim Cup: 2010

Al-Faisaly

- King Cup: 2020–21

Neom

- Saudi First Division League: 2024–25

Individual

- Saudi Professional League Manager of the Month: October 2021, November 2021, May 2023

== See also ==
- List of football managers with the most matches
