= Daisuke Takahashi (footballer) =

Japanese footballer

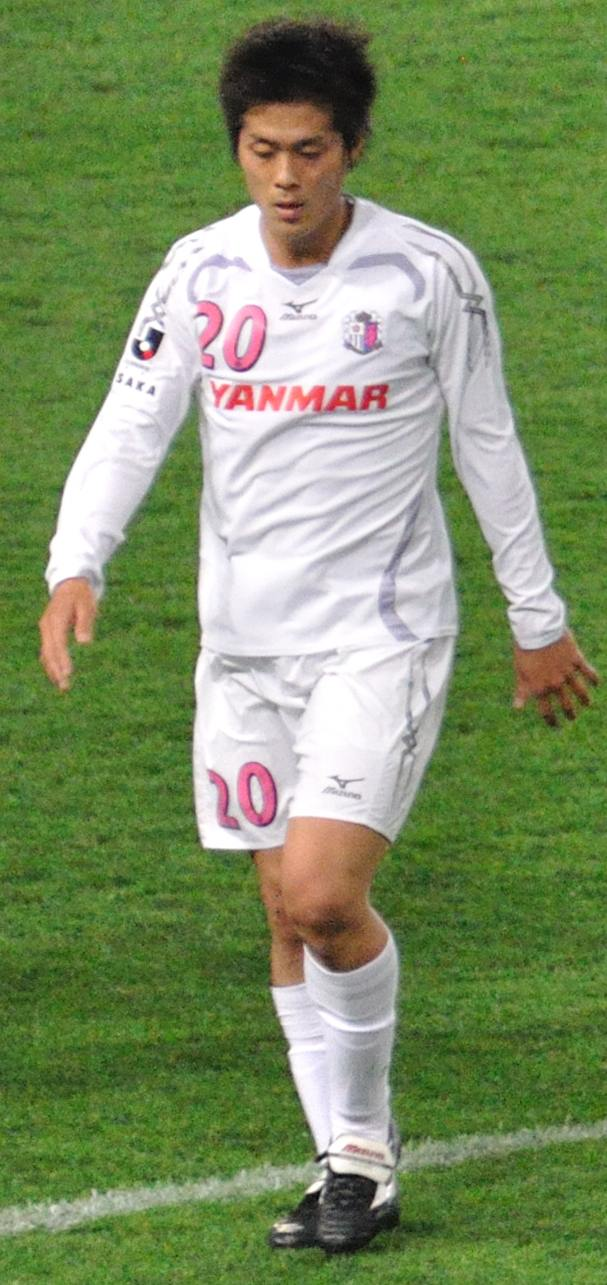

Personal information
- Full name: Daisuke Takahashi
- Date of birth: September 18, 1983 (age 43)
- Place of birth: Yame, Fukuoka, Japan
- Height: 1.78 m (5 ft 10 in)
- Position: Midfielder

Youth career
- 2002–2005: Fukuoka University

Senior career*
Years	Team	Apps	(Gls)
2006–2009	Oita Trinita	105	(21)
2010–2012	Cerezo Osaka	59	(3)
Total		164	(24)
Medal record
Oita Trinita
Winner	J.League Cup	2008
- * Club domestic league appearances and goals

Daisuke Takahashi (高橋 大輔, Takahashi Daisuke; born September 18, 1983) is a Japanese football coach and former football player, he is the currently assistant manager of J1 League club Cerezo Osaka. His brother is Yutaro Takahashi.

== Club statistics ==
Club performance			League		Cup		League Cup		Total	
Season	Club	League	Apps	Goals	Apps	Goals	Apps	Goals	Apps	Goals
Japan			League		Emperor's Cup		League Cup		Total	
2006	Oita Trinita	J1 League	23	5	2	4	4	0	29	9
2007	Oita Trinita	J1 League	29	10	0	0	5	2	34	12
2008	Oita Trinita	J1 League	21	1	0	0	5	0	26	1
2009	Oita Trinita	J1 League	32	5	2	0	3	0	37	5
2010	Cerezo Osaka	J1 League	29	3	2	1	5	0	36	4
2011	Cerezo Osaka	J1 League	17	0	0	0	0	0	17	0
2012	Cerezo Osaka	J1 League								
Career total			151	24	6	5	22	2	179	31

== Honors ==
- J.League Cup : 2008
