= 2008 J.League Cup =

J.League Yamazaki Nabisco Cup

Tournament details
- Country: Japan
- Dates: March 20 and November 1

Final positions
- Champions: Oita Trinita (1st title)
- Runners-up: Shimizu S-Pulse
- Semifinalists: Gamba Osaka; Nagoya Grampus

Tournament statistics
- Matches played: 61

The 2008 edition of the J. League Cup, officially the 2008 J.League Yamazaki Nabisco Cup, sponsored by Nabisco began on March 20. The top team in each of the four qualifying group automatically qualified for the quarter-finals along with the best two remaining runners-up. Both Gamba Osaka and Kashima Antlers received a bye to the quarter-final stage due to their participation in the group stage of the Asian Champions League.

Oita Trinita defeated Shimizu S-Pulse 2–0 in the final on November 1 at the Tokyo National Stadium. They qualified for the 2009 Pan-Pacific Championship and the 2009 Suruga Bank Championship.

== Group stage ==
=== Group A ===
Team	Pld	W	D	L	GF	GA	GD	Pts
Nagoya Grampus	6	5	0	1	14	5	+9	15
Vissel Kobe	6	3	1	2	5	5	0	10
Kyoto Sanga FC	6	1	3	2	7	8	−1	6
Urawa Red Diamonds	6	0	2	4	8	16	−8	2

Date	Team 1	Score	Team 2
March 20, 2008	Nagoya Grampus	0–1	Kyoto Sanga
March 20, 2008	Urawa Reds	0–1	Vissel Kobe
March 23, 2008	Vissel Kobe	0–1	Nagoya Grampus
March 23, 2008	Kyoto Sanga	3–3	Urawa Red Diamonds
April 16, 2008	Urawa Red Diamonds	1–1	Kyoto Sanga
April 16, 2008	Nagoya Grampus	2–0	Vissel Kobe
May 25, 2008	Kyoto Sanga	0–1	Vissel Kobe
May 25, 2008	Nagoya Grampus	4–2	Urawa Red Diamonds
May 31, 2008	Kyoto Sanga	1–2	Nagoya Grampus
May 31, 2008	Vissel Kobe	2–1	Urawa Red Diamonds
June 8, 2008	Urawa Red Diamonds	1–5	Nagoya Grampus
June 8, 2008	Vissel Kobe	1–1	Kyoto Sanga

=== Group B ===
Team	Pld	W	D	L	GF	GA	GD	Pts
Shimizu S-Pulse	6	3	2	1	13	6	+7	11
FC Tokyo	6	3	2	1	12	7	+5	11
Júbilo Iwata	6	3	1	2	10	7	+3	10
Tokyo Verdy	6	0	1	5	2	17	−15	1

Date	Team 1	Score	Team 2
March 20, 2008	Tokyo Verdy	0–2	Jubilo Iwata
March 20, 2008	Shimizu S-Pulse	3–1	FC Tokyo
March 23, 2008	Jubilo Iwata	0–2	FC Tokyo
March 23, 2008	Tokyo Verdy	0–0	Shimizu S-Pulse
April 16, 2008	Shimizu S-Pulse	5–0	Tokyo Verdy
April 16, 2008	FC Tokyo	1–1	Jubilo Iwata
May 25, 2008	Shimizu S-Pulse	4–2	Jubilo Iwata
May 25, 2008	FC Tokyo	3–0	Tokyo Verdy
May 31, 2008	FC Tokyo	1–1	Shimizu S-Pulse
May 31, 2008	Jubilo Iwata	3–0	Tokyo Verdy
June 8, 2008	Tokyo Verdy	2–4	FC Tokyo
June 8, 2008	Jubilo Iwata	2–0	Shimizu S-Pulse

=== Group C ===
Team	Pld	W	D	L	GF	GA	GD	Pts
JEF United Chiba	6	3	3	0	9	5	+4	12
Kashiwa Reysol	6	2	3	1	9	7	+2	9
Kawasaki Frontale	6	2	0	4	9	10	−1	6
Consadole Sapporo	6	1	2	3	4	9	−5	5

Date	Team 1	Score	Team 2
March 20, 2008	Kawasaki Frontale	0–2	JEF United
March 20, 2008	Kashiwa Reysol	1–1	Consadole Sapporo
March 23, 2008	Consadole Sapporo	2–1	Kawasaki Frontale
March 23, 2008	JEF United	1–1	Kashiwa Reysol
April 16, 2008	JEF United	0–0	Consadole Sapporo
April 16, 2008	Kawasaki Frontale	3–0	Kashiwa Reysol
May 25, 2008	Consadole Sapporo	1–2	JEF United
May 25, 2008	Kashiwa Reysol	3–1	Kawasaki Frontale
May 31, 2008	Kawasaki Frontale	2–0	Consadole Sapporo
May 31, 2008	Kashiwa Reysol	1–1	JEF United
June 8, 2008	Consadole Sapporo	0–3	Kashiwa Reysol
June 8, 2008	JEF United	3–2	Kawasaki Frontale

=== Group D ===
Team	Pld	W	D	L	GF	GA	GD	Pts
Yokohama F. Marinos	6	3	3	0	8	2	+6	12
Oita Trinita	6	3	2	1	9	5	+4	11
Albirex Niigata	6	0	4	2	4	8	−4	4
Omiya Ardija	6	0	3	3	4	10	−6	3

Date	Team 1	Score	Team 2
March 20, 2008	Yokohama F. Marinos	1–0	Oita Trinita
March 20, 2008	Albirex Niigata	2–2	Omiya Ardija
March 23, 2008	Omiya Ardija	0–0	Yokohama F. Marinos
March 23, 2008	Oita Trinita	3–0	Albirex Niigata
April 16, 2008	Yokohama F. Marinos	4–0	Omiya Ardija
April 16, 2008	Albirex Niigata	1–1	Oita Trinita
May 25, 2008	Omiya Ardija	1–2	Oita Trinita
May 25, 2008	Yokohama F. Marinos	0–0	Albirex Niigata
May 31, 2008	Omiya Ardija	1–1	Albirex Niigata
May 31, 2008	Oita Trinita	2–2	Yokohama F. Marinos
June 8, 2008	Albirex Niigata	0–1	Yokohama F. Marinos
June 8, 2008	Oita Trinita	1–0	Omiya Ardija

== Knockout stage ==
Quarter-finals
JEF United Chiba	0	0	0
Nagoya Grampus	1	1	2
FC Tokyo	1	1	2
Oita Trinita	2	1	3
Kashima Antlers	0	1	1
Shimizu S-Pulse	0	2	2
Gamba Osaka	1	1	2
Yokohama F. Marinos	0	2	2

Semi-finals
Nagoya Grampus	1	0	1
Oita Trinita	1	1	2
Shimizu S-Pulse	1	3	4
Gamba Osaka	1	2	3

Final
Oita Trinita	2
Shimizu S-Pulse	0

=== Quarter-finals ===
==== First leg ====
July 2, 2008
19:00

FC Tokyo	1–2	Oita Trinita
Ishikawa 44'	Report	Maeda 28'; Edmilson 83'

Ajinomoto Stadium, Tokyo
Attendance: 11,378
Referee: Kenji Ogiya

July 2, 2008
19:00

JEF United Chiba	0–1	Nagoya Grampus
	Report	Johnsen 14'

Fukuda Denshi Arena, Chiba
Attendance: 8,472
Referee: Nobutsugu Murakami

July 2, 2008
18:59

Gamba Osaka	1–0	Yokohama F. Marinos
Hirai 78'	Report

Ishikawa Athletics Stadium, Kanazawa
Attendance: 10,702
Referee: Hiroyoshi Takayama

July 2, 2008
19:00

Kashima Antlers	0–0	Shimizu S-Pulse
	Report

Kashima Soccer Stadium, Kashima
Attendance: 6,757
Referee: Hajime Matsuo

==== Second leg ====
August 6, 2008

Oita Trinita	1–1	FC Tokyo
Edmilson 40'	Report	Cabore 3'

Kyushu Oil Dome
Attendance: 13,483
Referee: Hiroshi Tanabe

August 6, 2008

Nagoya Grampus	1–0	JEF United Chiba
Masukawa 60'	Report

Mizuho Athletic Stadium
Attendance: 6,344
Referee: Minoru Tojo

August 6, 2008

Yokohama F. Marinos	2–1	Gamba Osaka
Komiyama 32'; Lopes 84'	Report	Futagawa 34'

Mitsuzawa Stadium
Attendance: 8,365
Referee: Akio Okutani

Gamba Osaka advances to the semi-finals on Away goals rule.

August 6, 2008

Shimizu S-Pulse	2–1	Kashima Antlers
Iwashita 16'; Hyodo 48'	Report	Marquinhos 57'

Nihondaira Sports Stadium
Attendance: 8,949
Referee: Kazuhiko Matsumura

=== Semifinals ===
==== First leg ====
September 3, 2008
19:00

Nagoya Grampus	1–1	Oita Trinita
Johnsen 64'	Report	Ueslei 69'

Mizuho Park Athletics Stadium, Nagoya
Attendance: 7,792
Referee: Hirofumi Yamanishi

September 3, 2008
19:00

Shimizu S-Pulse	1–1	Gamba Osaka
Edamura 54'	Report	Futagawa 10'

Nihondaira Sports Stadium, Shimizu-ku
Attendance: 8,013
Referee: Kenji Ogiya

==== Second leg ====
September 7, 2008
18:00

Oita Trinita	1–0	Nagoya Grampus
Ueslei 49'	Report

Kyushu Oil Dome, Ōita
Attendance: 20,371
Referee: Masayoshi Okada

September 7, 2008
19:00

Gamba Osaka	2–3	Shimizu S-Pulse
Rôni 11'; Lucas 79'	Report	Yamamoto 3'; Edamura 46' 55'

Expo '70 Commemorative Stadium, Suita
Attendance: 9,103
Referee: Yuichi Nishimura

=== Final ===
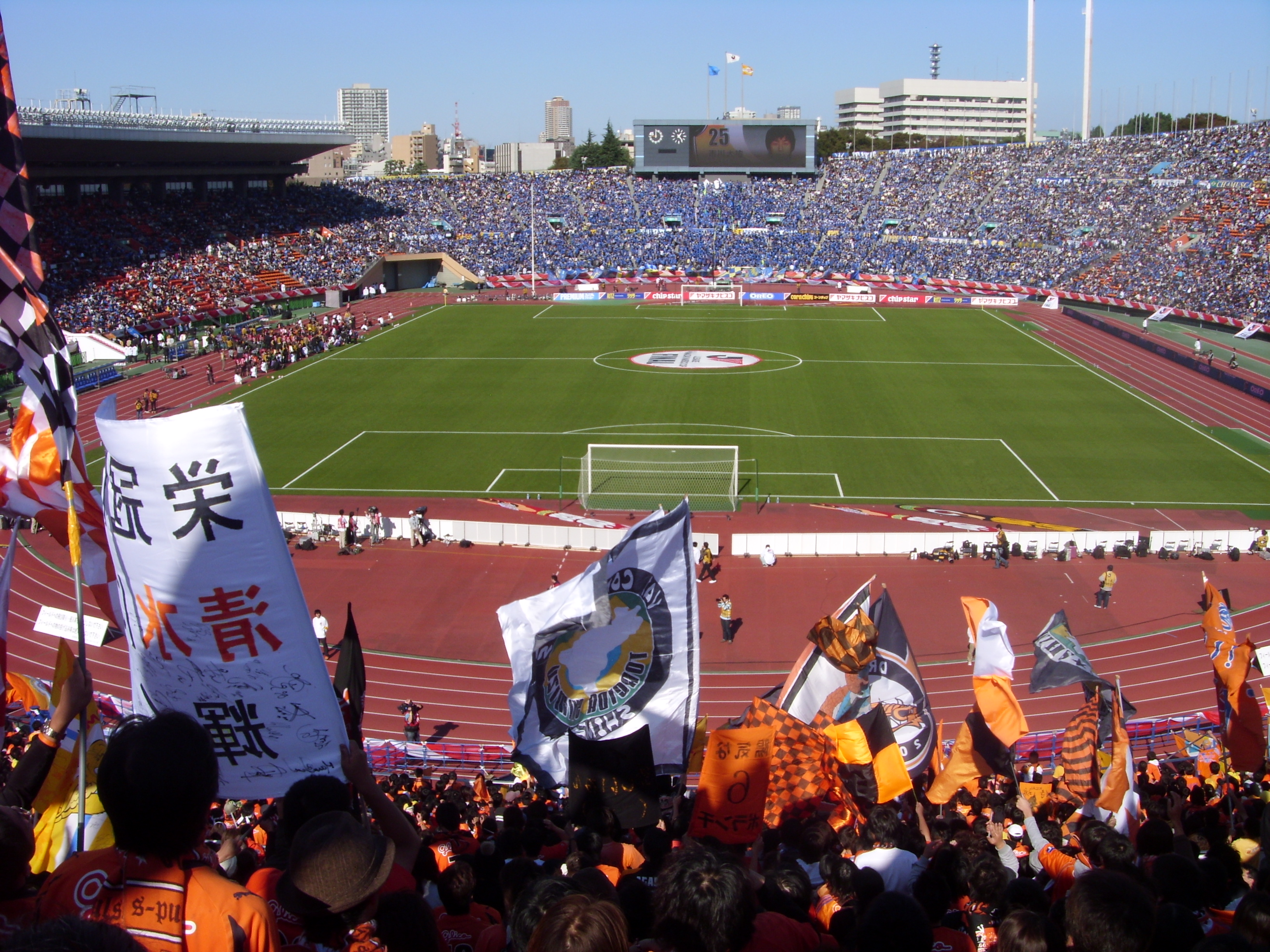
The 2008 final

November 1, 2008

Oita Trinita	2–0	Shimizu S-Pulse
Takamatsu 68'; Ueslei 89'	Report

National Stadium, Tokyo
Attendance: 44,723
Referee: Toshimitsu Yoshida

Oita Trinita:
GK	16	(Japan) Seigo Shimokawa	(yellow card) 85'
RB	4	(Japan) Yuki Fukaya
CB	6	(Japan) Masato Morishige
LB	22	(Japan) Taikai Uemoto	(yellow card) 33'
DM	3	(Brazil) Roberto
DM	5	(Brazil) Edmilson
RM	20	(Japan) Daisuke Takahashi
LM	33	(Japan) Yoshiaki Fujita		(yellow card) 84' (substituted off) 89'
AM	8	(Japan) Mu Kanazaki	(substituted off) 89'
CF	10	(Brazil) Ueslei
CF	13	(Japan) Daiki Takamatsu (c)	(substituted off) 82'
Substitutes:
GK	29	(Japan) Keisuke Shimizu
DF	25	(Japan) Hiroyuki Kobayashi	(substituted on) 89'
MF	2	(Japan) Ryo Kobayashi
MF	7	(Japan) Teppei Nishiyama	(substituted on) 89'
MF	14	(Japan) Akihiro Ienaga
FW	18	(Japan) Hiroshi Kiyotake
FW	9	(Japan) Yasuhito Morishima	(substituted on) 82'
Manager:
(Brazil) Chamusca

Shimizu S-Pulse:
GK	29	(Japan) Kaito Yamamoto
RB	5	(Japan) Keisuke Iwashita
CB	4	(Japan) Kazumichi Takagi (c)	(yellow card) 74'
CB	26	(Japan) Naoki Aoyama
LB	2	(Japan) Arata Kodama	(substituted off) 71'
RM	28	(Japan) Masaki Yamamoto	(substituted off) 71'
CM	7	(Japan) Teruyoshi Ito
AM	8	(Japan) Takuma Edamura	(substituted off) 82'
LM	13	(Japan) Akihiro Hyodo
CF	19	(Japan) Kazuki Hara	(yellow card) 89'
CF	23	(Japan) Shinji Okazaki
Substitutes:
GK	21	(Japan) Yohei Nishibe
DF	3	(Japan) Takahiro Yamanishi
DF	25	(Japan) Daisuke Ichikawa		(substituted on) 71'
MF	16	(Japan) Takuya Honda
MF	6	(Brazil) Marcos Paulo		(substituted on) 71'
FW	11	(Japan) Mitsuhiro Toda
FW	9	(Japan) Takuro Yajima		(substituted on) 82'
Manager:
(Japan) Kenta Hasegawa

== Awards ==
- MVP: (Japan) Daiki Takamatsu (Oita Trinita)
- Top Scorer: (Japan) Keita Sugimoto (Nagoya Grampus)
- New Hero Prize: (Japan) Mu Kanazaki (Oita Trinita)
