= Yoshiaki Fujita =

Japanese footballer (born 1983)

Yoshiaki Fujita 藤田 義明
Personal information
- Full name: Yoshiaki Fujita
- Date of birth: 12 January 1983 (age 43)
- Place of birth: Utsunomiya, Tochigi, Japan
- Height: 1.80 m (5 ft 11 in)
- Position: Defender

College career
Years	Team	Apps	(Gls)
2001–2004	Juntendo University		

Senior career*
Years	Team	Apps	(Gls)
2005–2006	JEF United Chiba	1	(0)
2006–2010	Oita Trinita	109	(2)
2011–2020	Júbilo Iwata	228	(3)
Medal record
JEF United Chiba
Winner	J.League Cup	2005
Winner	J.League Cup	2006
Oita Trinita
Winner	J.League Cup	2008
- * Club domestic league appearances and goals as of 4 January 2021

Yoshiaki Fujita (藤田 義明, Fujita Yoshiaki; born 12 January 1983) is a Japanese former professional footballer who played as a defender for JEF United Chiba, Oita Trinita and most notably Júbilo Iwata.

== Early life ==
Fujita started playing football at 6 years old and looked up to German players Lothar Matthäus and Jürgen Klinsmann as inspiration. He attended Utsunomiya Hakuyo High School.

== Club career ==
Fujita attended Juntendo University between 2001 and 2004. He signed his first professional contract in 2005 with J. League Division 1 club JEF United Chiba. He made his debut for the club in a 2–1 league defeat to Shimizu S-Pulse in April 2005. After getting little game time at JEF United Chiba, Fujita was loaned to Oita Trinita for the second half of the 2006 season. He again struggled for game time until he moved permanently to Oita in 2007 and made his way into the starting XI. He helped the club win the 2008 J.League Cup. After making over 100 appearances for Oita Trinita, he transferred to J1 League club Júbilo Iwata in 2011. He stayed at the club for ten seasons, making almost 300 appearances across all competitions, before announcing his retirement in December 2020.

== Coaching career ==
Following retirement, Fujita stayed with Júbilo Iwata, firstly as their U-15 coach in 2021, the U-13 coach in 2022 and spent 8 months as the U-18 manager in 2023. At the start of the 2024 season, he was named as one of the first team coaches at Júbilo.

== Career statistics ==
=== Club ===
Appearances and goals by club, season and competition
Club	Season	League			National Cup		League Cup		Other		Total	
Club	Season	Division	Apps	Goals	Apps	Goals	Apps	Goals	Apps	Goals	Apps	Goals
Japan			League		Emperor's Cup		J. League Cup		Other		Total	
JEF United Chiba	2005	J1 League	1	0	0	0	0	0	–		1	0
JEF United Chiba	2006	J1 League	0	0	0	0	0	0	–		0	0
JEF United Chiba	Total		1	0	0	0	0	0	0	0	1	0
Oita Trinita	2006	J1 League	4	0	0	0	0	0	–		4	0
Oita Trinita	2007	J1 League	31	2	2	0	5	0	–		38	2
Oita Trinita	2008	J1 League	26	0	1	0	11	0	–		38	0
Oita Trinita	2009	J1 League	28	0	2	0	6	0	1 (Note: Appearance in J.League Cup / Copa Sudamericana Championship)	0	37	0
Oita Trinita	2010	J2 League	20	0	2	0	–		–		22	0
Oita Trinita	Total		109	2	7	0	22	0	1	0	139	2
Júbilo Iwata	2011	J1 League	31	1	1	0	4	0	1	0	37	1
Júbilo Iwata	2012	J1 League	31	1	2	0	3	0	–		36	1
Júbilo Iwata	2013	J1 League	32	0	2	0	5	0	–		39	0
Júbilo Iwata	2014	J2 League	41	0	3	0	–		1 (Note: Appearance in J1 League promotion play-offs)	0	45	0
Júbilo Iwata	2015	J2 League	36	1	0	0	–		–		36	1
Júbilo Iwata	2016	J1 League	18	0	0	0	6	1	–		24	1
Júbilo Iwata	2017	J1 League	5	0	3	0	5	1	–		13	1
Júbilo Iwata	2018	J1 League	3	0	3	0	5	0	0	0	11	0
Júbilo Iwata	2019	J1 League	10	0	3	0	7	0	–		20	0
Júbilo Iwata	2020	J2 League	21	0	0	0	–		–		21	0
Júbilo Iwata	Total		228	3	17	0	35	2	2	0	282	5
Career total			338	5	24	0	57	2	3	0	422	7

== Honours ==
Oita Trinita

- J.League Cup: 2008
