= 2001 Emperor's Cup final =

2001 Emperor's Cup Final
Shimizu S-Pulse	Cerezo Osaka
3	2
- Date: January 1, 2002
- Venue: National Stadium, Tokyo

2001 Emperor's Cup Final was the 81st final of the Emperor's Cup competition. The final was played at National Stadium in Tokyo on January 1, 2002. Shimizu S-Pulse won the championship.

== Overview ==
Shimizu S-Pulse won their 1st title, by defeating Cerezo Osaka 3–2 with Alessandro Santos, Ryuzo Morioka and Baron goal.

== Match details ==
January 1, 2002

Shimizu S-Pulse	3–2	Cerezo Osaka
Alessandro Santos 20'; Ryuzo Morioka 68'; Baron 97'		Hiroaki Morishima 79'; Yoon Jong-hwan 89'

National Stadium

Shimizu S-Pulse
GK	20	(Japan) Takaya Kurokawa
DF	11	(Japan) Ryuzo Morioka
DF	6	(Japan) Katsumi Oenoki
DF	3	(Japan) Takuma Koga
MF	13	(Japan) Kohei Hiramatsu
MF	12	(Japan) Yasuhiro Yoshida
MF	4	(Japan) Kazuyuki Toda
MF	8	(Japan) Alessandro Santos
MF	10	(Japan) Masaaki Sawanobori
FW	15	(Japan) Yoshikiyo Kuboyama	(substituted off) 64'
FW	18	(Brazil) Baron
Substitutes:
GK	16	(Japan) Keisuke Hada
DF	19	(Japan) Shohei Ikeda
MF	30	(Japan) Jumpei Takaki
FW	17	(Japan) Takayuki Yokoyama	(substituted on) 64'
FW	26	(Japan) Kotaro Yamazaki
Manager:
(Federal Republic of Yugoslavia) Zemunović

Cerezo Osaka
GK	1	(Japan) Seigo Shimokawa
DF	3	(Japan) Daisuke Saito
DF	14	(Japan) Satoru Suzuki
DF	36	(Japan) Ichiei Muroi
MF	16	(Japan) Nobuki Hara
MF	4	(Japan) Kazuaki Tasaka
MF	32	(Japan) Takeshi Hamada	(substituted off) 70'
MF	24	(Japan) Michiharu Sugimoto	(substituted off) 59'
MF	6	(South Korea) Yoon Jong-hwan
FW	8	(Japan) Hiroaki Morishima
FW	9	(Japan) Kenji Oshiba	(substituted off) 59'
Substitutes:
GK	21	(Japan) Kazumasa Kawano
DF	5	(Japan) Shigeki Kurata
MF	15	(Japan) Yoshito Ōkubo	(substituted off) 59'
FW	25	(Japan) Kazunari Okayama	(substituted off) 59'
FW	33	(Japan) Yasuo Manaka	(substituted off) 70'
Manager:
(Japan) Akihiro Nishimura

== See also ==
- 2001 Emperor's Cup
