= Kazumichi Takagi =

Japanese footballer

Kazumichi Takagi 高木 和道
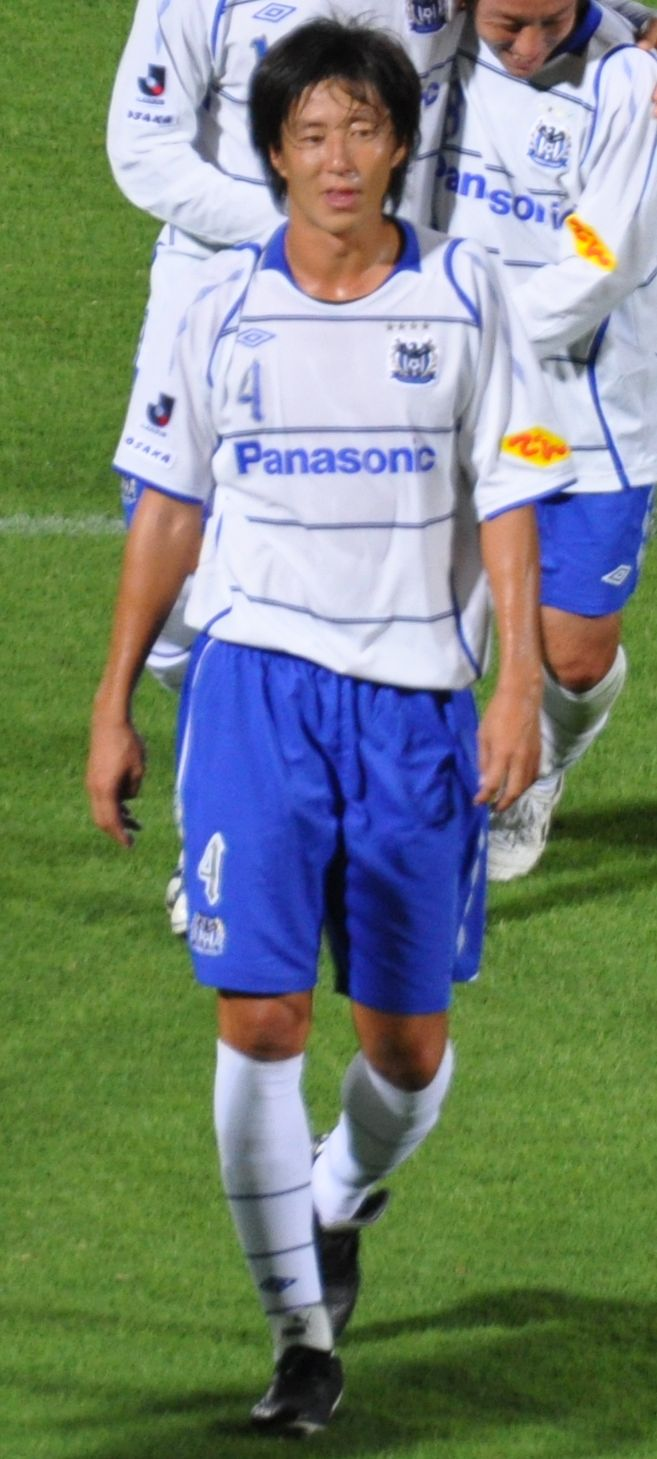

Personal information
- Full name: Kazumichi Takagi
- Date of birth: 21 November 1980 (age 45)
- Place of birth: Yasu, Shiga, Japan
- Height: 1.88 m (6 ft 2 in)
- Position: Defender

Youth career
- 1996–1998: Kusatsu Higashi High School
- 1999–2000: Kyoto Sangyo University

Senior career*
Years	Team	Apps	(Gls)
2000–2008	Shimizu S-Pulse	156	(2)
2004	→Vissel Kobe (loan)	13	(0)
2009–2011	Gamba Osaka	53	(3)
2012	Vissel Kobe	9	(0)
2013–2014	Oita Trinita	61	(1)
2015	FC Gifu	29	(2)
2016	Júbilo Iwata	0	(0)
2017	Air Force Central	19	(0)
2018	MIO Biwako Shiga	25	(2)
Total		365	(10)

International career
2008–2009	Japan	5	(0)
Medal record
Shimizu S-Pulse
Runner-up	J.League Cup	2008
Winner	Emperor's Cup	2001
Runner-up	Emperor's Cup	2000
Runner-up	Emperor's Cup	2005
Gamba Osaka
Runner-up	J1 League	2010
Winner	Emperor's Cup	2009
- * Club domestic league appearances and goals

Kazumichi Takagi (高木 和道, Takagi Kazumichi; born 21 November 1980) is a former Japanese football player.

== Playing career ==
Takagi was born in Yasu on 21 November 1980. After dropped out from Kyoto Sangyo University, he joined J1 League club Shimizu S-Pulse in June 2000. However he could hardly play in the match until 2002. In 2003, he played many matches as left side back until summer. However he could not play many matches from summer 2003. In August 2004, he moved to Vissel Kobe on loan. He became a regular player as center back of three backs defense. In 2005, he returned to Shimizu S-Pulse. He became a regular player as defensive midfielder and played with Teruyoshi Ito for the position. From summer 2005, he became a regular player as center back. He played with mainly Toshihide Saito or Ryuzo Morioka for the position and the club won the 2nd place Emperor's Cup. From 2006, he played as center back with Naoaki Aoyama for 3 seasons and the club won the 2nd place 2008 J.League Cup. In 2009, he moved to Gamba Osaka. In 2009, although he could not play many matches in league competition, he played many matches in Emperor's Cup and won the champions. In 2010, he became a regular player and played many matches as center back with Sota Nakazawa. The club also won the 2nd place in J1 League. However his opportunity to play decreased behind Satoshi Yamaguchi in 2011. In 2012, he moved to Vissel Kobe again. However he could not play many matches and the club was relegated to J2 League end of 2012 season. In 2013, he moved to Oita Trinita. Although he played many matches as center back of three backs defense, the club was relegated to J2 from 2014. In 2014, he became a captain and played many matches as regular center back. In 2015, he moved to J2 club FC Gifu and played many matches as center back. In 2016, he moved to J1 club Júbilo Iwata. However he could hardly play in the match. In 2017, he moved to Thailand and joined Air Force Central. In 2018, he returned to Japan and joined his locals club MIO Biwako Shiga in Japan Football League. He retired end of 2018 season.

== National team career ==
On 20 August 2008, he debuted for Japan national team against Uruguay. He played 5 games for Japan until 2009.

== Club statistics ==
Club performance			League		Cup		League Cup		Continental		Total	
Season	Club	League	Apps	Goals	Apps	Goals	Apps	Goals	Apps	Goals	Apps	Goals
Japan			League		Emperor's Cup		J.League Cup		Asia		Total	
2000	Shimizu S-Pulse	J1 League	0	0	0	0	0	0	-		0	0
2001	Shimizu S-Pulse	J1 League	5	0	0	0	0	0	-		5	0
2002	Shimizu S-Pulse	J1 League	0	0	0	0	3	0	-		3	0
2003	Shimizu S-Pulse	J1 League	16	0	4	0	1	0	3	2	22	2
2004	Shimizu S-Pulse	J1 League	2	0	0	0	1	0	-		3	0
2004	Vissel Kobe	J1 League	13	0	1	0	0	0	-		14	0
2005	Shimizu S-Pulse	J1 League	33	1	5	0	8	1	-		46	2
2006	Shimizu S-Pulse	J1 League	32	0	3	0	6	0	-		41	0
2007	Shimizu S-Pulse	J1 League	34	0	3	0	5	0	-		42	0
2008	Shimizu S-Pulse	J1 League	34	1	2	1	7	1	-		43	3
2009	Gamba Osaka	J1 League	9	0	5	0	0	0	2	0	16	0
2010	Gamba Osaka	J1 League	31	2	3	0	2	0	7	0	43	2
2011	Gamba Osaka	J1 League	13	1	1	0	2	0	3	0	19	1
2012	Vissel Kobe	J1 League	9	0	1	0	6	0	-		16	0
2013	Oita Trinita	J1 League	21	0	2	0	1	0	-		23	0
2014	Oita Trinita	J2 League	40	1	1	0	-		-		41	1
2015	FC Gifu	J2 League	29	2	0	0	-		-		29	2
2016	Júbilo Iwata	J1 League	0	0	3	1	3	0	-		29	2
2018	MIO Biwako Shiga	Football League	25	2	2	0	-		-		27	2
Career total			346	10	36	2	45	2	15	2	442	16

== National team statistics ==
Japan national team
Year	Apps	Goals
2008	3	0
2009	2	0
Total	5	0

=== Appearances in major competitions ===
Team	Competition	Category	Appearances		Goals	Team record
Team	Competition	Category	Start	Sub	Goals	Team record
Japan	2011 AFC Asian Cup qualification	Senior	1	0	0	

== Honours and awards ==
- Emperor's Cup - 2001, 2009
