= Teruyoshi Itō =

Japanese footballer

Teruyoshi Ito 伊東 輝悦
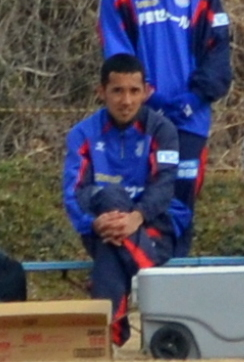
- Ito with Ventforet Kofu

Personal information
- Date of birth: 31 August 1974 (age 52)
- Place of birth: Shizuoka, Shizuoka, Japan
- Height: 1.68 m (5 ft 6 in)
- Position: Midfielder

Youth career
- 1990–1992: Tokai University Daiichi High School

Senior career*
Years	Team	Apps	(Gls)
1993–2010	Shimizu S-Pulse	483	(30)
2011–2013	Ventforet Kofu	59	(0)
2014–2015	AC Nagano Parceiro	11	(0)
2016	Blaublitz Akita	2	(0)
2017–2024	Azul Claro Numazu	5	(0)
Total		560	(30)

International career
1996	Japan U23	3	(1)
1997–2001	Japan	27	(0)
Medal record
Men's football
Representing Japan
FIFA Confederations Cup
Runner-up	2001 Korea/Japan
- * Club domestic league appearances and goals

Teruyoshi Ito (伊東 輝悦, Itō Teruyoshi; born 31 August 1974) is a former Japanese professional footballer who played as a midfielder.

== Club career ==
Ito was born in Shizuoka on 31 August 1974. After graduating from high school, he joined J1 League club Shimizu S-Pulse based in his local in 1993. He debuted in June 1994 and played several matches in 1994 season. He became a regular midfielder under manager Masakatsu Miyamoto from 1995 season and played as central player for the club for a long time. In 1996, S-Pulse won the champions in J.League Cup first title in the club history. In 1999, S-Pulse the 2nd place in J1 League and he also was selected Best Eleven award. In 2000, S-Pulse won the Asian title, 1999–2000 Asian Cup Winners' Cup. In 2001, S-Pulse won Emperor's Cup. After that, the club results was sluggish. In 2005, former teammate Kenta Hasegawa became a new manager. Although S-Pulse finished at the 15th place which is worst position in the club history in J1 League, S-Pulse won the 2nd place in 2005 Emperor's Cup. However the club results was raised under manager Hasegawa from 2006 and S-Pulse won the 2nd place in 2008 J.League Cup. Ito also played all matches in J1 League from 2006 to 2008 season and received the fair play awards in 2007. In 2010, his opportunity to play decreased and he resigned end of 2010 season.

In 2011, Ito moved to newly promoted J1 club Ventforet Kofu with Daisuke Ichikawa who is teammate in S-Pulse for 13 seasons. On 16 July 2011, he became a first player to earn 500th matches in J1 League. Although, Ventforet was relegated to J2 League from 2012, the club won the champions in J2 and returned to J1 in a year. However Ito played only 6 matches in 2013 season and left the club end of 2013 season. In 2014, he moved to newly promoted J3 League club AC Nagano Parceiro. However he could not play many matches and left the club end of 2015 season. In 2016, he moved to J3 club Blaublitz Akita where he spent the 2016 season. In 2017, he moved to newly promoted J3 club Azul Claro Numazu. He finally made his début for Azul Claro Numazu two years later, on 24 November 2019, as an 81st-minute substitute for Kotaro Tokunaga in a 3–1 home win over Gainare Tottori.

== International career ==
In July 1996, Ito was selected for the Japan U23 national team for the 1996 Summer Olympics. At this tournament, he played the whole 90 minutes in all three matches. He is most remembered for his goal against Brazil in Atlanta which earned Japan a shock 1–0 victory. It was known as the "Miracle of Miami" (マイアミの奇跡) in Japan.

Ito was capped 27 times for the Japan national team between 1997 and 2001. He was an unused substitute at the 1998 FIFA World Cup.

== Career statistics ==
=== Club ===
As of 2 January 2022

Appearances and goals by club, season and competition
Club	Season	League			Emperor's Cup		J.League Cup		Asia		Total	
Club	Season	Division	Apps	Goals	Apps	Goals	Apps	Goals	Apps	Goals	Apps	Goals
Shimizu S-Pulse	1993	J1 League	0	0	3	1	0	0	–		3	1
Shimizu S-Pulse	1994	J1 League	6	0	0	0	1	0	–		7	0
Shimizu S-Pulse	1995	J1 League	44	4	1	0	–		–		45	4
Shimizu S-Pulse	1996	J1 League	26	4	3	0	7	1	–		36	5
Shimizu S-Pulse	1997	J1 League	31	7	3	1	6	1	–		40	9
Shimizu S-Pulse	1998	J1 League	34	5	5	0	1	0	–		40	5
Shimizu S-Pulse	1999	J1 League	29	1	3	0	4	1	–		36	2
Shimizu S-Pulse	2000	J1 League	24	1	5	1	4	0	–		33	2
Shimizu S-Pulse	2001	J1 League	27	1	1	0	2	0	–		30	1
Shimizu S-Pulse	2002	J1 League	22	0	3	0	2	0	1	0	28	0
Shimizu S-Pulse	2003	J1 League	30	2	4	0	4	0	2	0	40	2
Shimizu S-Pulse	2004	J1 League	30	1	1	0	7	0	–		38	1
Shimizu S-Pulse	2005	J1 League	32	0	5	0	5	0	–		42	0
Shimizu S-Pulse	2006	J1 League	34	2	3	0	5	0	–		42	2
Shimizu S-Pulse	2007	J1 League	34	1	3	0	2	0	–		39	1
Shimizu S-Pulse	2008	J1 League	34	0	2	0	9	0	–		45	0
Shimizu S-Pulse	2009	J1 League	30	0	2	0	8	0	–		40	0
Shimizu S-Pulse	2010	J1 League	16	1	5	0	6	0	–		27	1
Shimizu S-Pulse	Total		483	30	52	3	73	3	3	0	611	36
Ventforet Kofu	2011	J1 League	28	0	2	0	1	0	–		31	0
Ventforet Kofu	2012	J2 League	25	0	0	0	–		–		25	0
Ventforet Kofu	2013	J1 League	6	0	1	0	3	0	–		10	0
Ventforet Kofu	Total		59	0	3	0	4	0	–		66	0
AC Nagano Parceiro	2014	J3 League	8	0	0	0	–		–		8	0
AC Nagano Parceiro	2015	J3 League	3	0	0	0	–		–		3	0
AC Nagano Parceiro	Total		11	0	0	0	–		–		11	0
Blaublitz Akita	2016	J3 League	2	0	0	0	–		–		2	0
Azul Claro Numazu	2017	J3 League	0	0	1	0	–		–		1	0
Azul Claro Numazu	2018	J3 League	0	0	–		–		–		0	0
Azul Claro Numazu	2019	J3 League	1	0	–		–		–		1	0
Azul Claro Numazu	2020	J3 League	0	0	–		–		–		0	0
Azul Claro Numazu	2021	J3 League	0	0	–		–		–		0	0
Azul Claro Numazu	Total		1	0	1	0	–		–		2	0
Career total			556	30	56	3	77	3	3	0	692	36

=== International ===
Appearances and goals by national team and year
National team	Year	Apps	Goals
Japan	1997	1	0
Japan	1998	1	0
Japan	1999	7	0
Japan	2000	7	0
Japan	2001	11	0
Total		27	0

== Honors ==
Shimizu S-Pulse

- Emperor's Cup: 2001
- J.League Cup: 1996
- Japanese Super Cup: 2001, 2002
- Asian Cup Winners' Cup: 1999–2000

Japan

- FIFA Confederations Cup runner-up: 2001

Individual

- J1 League Best Eleven: 1999
- J.League Fair Play Award: 2007
