= Masaaki Sawanobori =

Japanese footballer

Masaaki Sawanobori 澤登 正朗
Personal information
- Full name: Masaaki Sawanobori
- Date of birth: January 12, 1970 (age 56)
- Place of birth: Fujinomiya, Shizuoka, Japan
- Height: 1.70 m (5 ft 7 in)
- Position: Midfielder

Youth career
- 1985–1987: Tokai University Daiichi High School

College career
Years	Team	Apps	(Gls)
1988–1991	Tokai University		

Senior career*
Years	Team	Apps	(Gls)
1992–2005	Shimizu S-Pulse	381	(85)
Total		381	(85)

International career
1993–2000	Japan	16	(3)
Medal record
Shimizu S-Pulse
Runner-up	J1 League	1999
Winner	J.League Cup	1996
Runner-up	J.League Cup	1992
Runner-up	J.League Cup	1993
Winner	Emperor's Cup	2001
Runner-up	Emperor's Cup	1998
Runner-up	Emperor's Cup	2000
Runner-up	Emperor's Cup	2005
- * Club domestic league appearances and goals

Masaaki Sawanobori (澤登 正朗, Sawanobori Masaaki; born January 12, 1970) is a former Japanese football player. He played for Japan national team.

== Club career ==
Sawanobori was born in Fujinomiya on January 12, 1970. After graduating from Tokai University, he joined new club Shimizu S-Pulse based in his local Shizuoka Prefecture in 1992. He played as regular player from first season. He was selected J.League Rookie of the Year in 1993. In 1996, the club won J.League Cup. In 1999, the club won the 2nd place in J1 League and he was selected Japanese Footballer of the Year awards. In Asia, the club also won 1999–2000 Asian Cup Winners' Cup. In 2001, the club won Emperor's Cup. He retired in 2005. He played 381 games and scored 85 goals in the league. Sawanobori was immensely popular at S-Pulse, and having spent his entire career at the club he was affectionately known as Mr S-Pulse.

== National team career ==
In April 1993, Sawanobori was selected Japan national team for 1994 World Cup qualification. At this qualification, on April 8, he debuted against Thailand. In 1994, he also played at 1994 Asian Games. In September 1999, he played for Japan for the first time in 5 years. In 2000, he played at 2000 Asian Cup qualification. This qualification was his last game for Japan. He played 16 games and scored 3 goals for Japan until 2000.

== Club statistics ==
Club performance			League		Cup		League Cup		Continental		Total	
Season	Club	League	Apps	Goals	Apps	Goals	Apps	Goals	Apps	Goals	Apps	Goals
Japan			League		Emperor's Cup		J.League Cup		Asia		Total	
1992	Shimizu S-Pulse	J1 League	-		3	0	10	1	-		13	1
1993	Shimizu S-Pulse	J1 League	35	7	4	2	1	0	-		40	9
1994	Shimizu S-Pulse	J1 League	41	7	1	0	1	0	-		43	7
1995	Shimizu S-Pulse	J1 League	40	13	1	0	-		-		41	13
1996	Shimizu S-Pulse	J1 League	29	9	3	0	16	3	-		48	12
1997	Shimizu S-Pulse	J1 League	31	11	3	1	6	0	-		40	12
1998	Shimizu S-Pulse	J1 League	32	10	5	3	4	2	-		41	15
1999	Shimizu S-Pulse	J1 League	28	9	3	0	4	1	-		35	10
2000	Shimizu S-Pulse	J1 League	27	3	5	0	4	1	-		36	4
2001	Shimizu S-Pulse	J1 League	26	9	5	2	2	1	-		33	12
2002	Shimizu S-Pulse	J1 League	29	3	3	2	7	3	0	0	39	8
2003	Shimizu S-Pulse	J1 League	14	2	4	0	2	0	1	1	21	3
2004	Shimizu S-Pulse	J1 League	24	1	1	0	5	0	-		30	1
2005	Shimizu S-Pulse	J1 League	25	1	1	0	5	0	-		31	1
Total			381	85	41	10	57	11	1	1	480	107

== National team statistics ==
Japan national team
Year	Apps	Goals
1993	5	1
1994	6	1
1995	0	0
1996	0	0
1997	0	0
1998	0	0
1999	1	0
2000	4	1
Total	16	3

== International goals ==
#	Date	Venue	Opponent	Score	Result	Competition
1.	May 7, 1993	Dubai, United Arab Emirates	United Arab Emirates	1–1	Draw	1994 FIFA World Cup Qualification
2.	October 9, 1994	Onomichi, Hiroshima, Japan	Myanmar	5–0	Won	1994 Asian Games
3.	February 16, 2000	Macau	Brunei	9–0	Won	2000 AFC Asian Cup Qualification

== Personal honors ==
- Japanese Footballer of the Year – 1999
- J.League Best XI – 1999
- J.League Rookie of the Year – 1993

== Team honors ==
Shimizu S-Pulse

- Emperor's Cup – 2001
- J.League Cup – 1996
- Japanese Super Cup – 2001, 2002
- Asian Cup Winners Cup – 2000

== See also ==
- List of one-club men
