= 2005 Shimizu S-Pulse season =

Shimizu S-Pulse
2005 season
- Manager: Kenta Hasegawa
- Stadium: Nihondaira Sports Stadium
- J. League 1: 15th
- Emperor's Cup: Runners-up
- J. League Cup: Quarterfinals
- Top goalscorer: Marquinhos (9); Cho Jae-Jin (9)

The 2005 S-Pulse season was S-Pulse's fourteenth season in existence and their thirteenth season in the J1 League. The club also competed in the Emperor's Cup and the J.League Cup. The team finished the season fifteenth in the league.

== Competitions ==
Competitions	Position
J. League 1	15th / 18 clubs
Emperor's Cup	Runners-up
J. League Cup	Quarterfinals

== Domestic results ==
=== J. League 1 ===
Match	Date	Venue	Opponents	Score
1	2005..	[[]]	[[]]	-
2	2005..	[[]]	[[]]	-
3	2005..	[[]]	[[]]	-
4	2005..	[[]]	[[]]	-
5	2005..	[[]]	[[]]	-
6	2005..	[[]]	[[]]	-
7	2005..	[[]]	[[]]	-
8	2005..	[[]]	[[]]	-
9	2005..	[[]]	[[]]	-
10	2005..	[[]]	[[]]	-
11	2005..	[[]]	[[]]	-
12	2005..	[[]]	[[]]	-
13	2005..	[[]]	[[]]	-
14	2005..	[[]]	[[]]	-
15	2005..	[[]]	[[]]	-
16	2005..	[[]]	[[]]	-
17	2005..	[[]]	[[]]	-
18	2005..	[[]]	[[]]	-
19	2005..	[[]]	[[]]	-
20	2005..	[[]]	[[]]	-
21	2005..	[[]]	[[]]	-
22	2005..	[[]]	[[]]	-
23	2005..	[[]]	[[]]	-
24	2005..	[[]]	[[]]	-
25	2005..	[[]]	[[]]	-
26	2005..	[[]]	[[]]	-
27	2005..	[[]]	[[]]	-
28	2005..	[[]]	[[]]	-
29	2005..	[[]]	[[]]	-
30	2005..	[[]]	[[]]	-
31	2005..	[[]]	[[]]	-
32	2005..	[[]]	[[]]	-
33	2005..	[[]]	[[]]	-
34	2005..	[[]]	[[]]	-

=== Emperor's Cup ===
Match	Date	Venue	Opponents	Score
4th Round	2005..	[[]]	[[]]	-
5th Round	2005..	[[]]	[[]]	-
Quarterfinals	2005..	[[]]	[[]]	-
Semifinals	2005..	[[]]	[[]]	-
Final	2005..	[[]]	[[]]	-

=== J. League Cup ===
Match	Date	Venue	Opponents	Score
GL-D-1	2005..	[[]]	[[]]	-
GL-D-2	2005..	[[]]	[[]]	-
GL-D-3	2005..	[[]]	[[]]	-
GL-D-4	2005..	[[]]	[[]]	-
GL-D-5	2005..	[[]]	[[]]	-
GL-D-6	2005..	[[]]	[[]]	-
Quarterfinals-1	2005..	[[]]	[[]]	-
Quarterfinals-2	2005..	[[]]	[[]]	-

== Player statistics ==
No.	Pos.	Player	D.o.B. (Age)	Height / Weight	J. League 1		Emperor's Cup		J. League Cup		Total	
No.	Pos.	Player	D.o.B. (Age)	Height / Weight	Apps	Goals	Apps	Goals	Apps	Goals	Apps	Goals
1	GK	Takaya Kurokawa	April 7, 1981 (aged 23)	cm / kg	5	0						
2	DF	Toshihide Saito	April 20, 1973 (aged 31)	cm / kg	28	0						
3	DF	Takahiro Yamanishi	April 2, 1976 (aged 28)	cm / kg	34	0						
4	DF	Kazumichi Takagi	November 21, 1980 (aged 24)	cm / kg	33	1						
5	MF	Yasuhiro Yoshida	July 14, 1969 (aged 35)	cm / kg	0	0						
6	MF	Kota Sugiyama	January 24, 1985 (aged 20)	cm / kg	14	2						
7	MF	Teruyoshi Ito	August 31, 1974 (aged 30)	cm / kg	32	0						
8	MF	Kohei Hiramatsu	April 19, 1980 (aged 24)	cm / kg	8	0						
9	FW	Hideaki Kitajima	May 23, 1978 (aged 26)	cm / kg	3	0						
10	MF	Masaaki Sawanobori	January 12, 1970 (aged 35)	cm / kg	25	1						
11	DF	Ryuzo Morioka	October 7, 1975 (aged 29)	cm / kg	23	1						
13	MF	Akihiro Hyodo	May 12, 1982 (aged 22)	cm / kg	15	2						
14	MF	Jumpei Takaki	September 1, 1982 (aged 22)	cm / kg	13	0						
15	FW	Yoshikiyo Kuboyama	July 21, 1976 (aged 28)	cm / kg	24	3						
16	FW	Choi Tae-Uk	March 13, 1981 (aged 23)	cm / kg	25	5						
17	MF	Tomoyoshi Tsurumi	October 12, 1979 (aged 25)	cm / kg	0	0						
17	FW	Marquinhos	March 23, 1976 (aged 28)	cm / kg	14	9						
18	FW	Cho Jae-Jin	July 9, 1981 (aged 23)	cm / kg	29	9						
19	DF	Takumi Wada	October 20, 1981 (aged 23)	cm / kg	2	0						
20	MF	Yukihiko Sato	May 11, 1976 (aged 28)	cm / kg	12	1						
21	GK	Yohei Nishibe	December 1, 1980 (aged 24)	cm / kg	29	0						
22	MF	Keisuke Ota	July 23, 1981 (aged 23)	cm / kg	17	3						
23	FW	Shinji Okazaki	April 16, 1986 (aged 18)	cm / kg	1	0						
24	DF	Yasuhiro Hiraoka	May 23, 1986 (aged 18)	cm / kg	0	0						
25	DF	Daisuke Ichikawa	May 14, 1980 (aged 24)	cm / kg	34	0						
26	DF	Naoaki Aoyama	July 18, 1986 (aged 18)	cm / kg	6	2						
27	MF	Jun Muramatsu	April 10, 1982 (aged 22)	cm / kg	1	0						
28	FW	Shinji Suzuki	August 29, 1986 (aged 18)	cm / kg	0	0						
29	FW	Takanori Maeda	June 30, 1985 (aged 19)	cm / kg	0	0						
30	DF	Keisuke Iwashita	September 24, 1986 (aged 18)	cm / kg	6	0						
31	GK	Kaito Yamamoto	July 10, 1985 (aged 19)	cm / kg	0	0						
32	MF	Takuma Edamura	November 16, 1986 (aged 18)	cm / kg	8	0						
33	FW	Shunichiro Zaitsu	January 23, 1987 (aged 18)	cm / kg	4	0						
34	DF	Rogério Corrêa	January 3, 1979 (aged 26)	cm / kg	0	0						
35	MF	Jungo Fujimoto	March 24, 1984 (aged 20)	cm / kg	0	0						
36	MF	Masaki Yamamoto	August 24, 1987 (aged 17)	cm / kg	4	0						
37	DF	Yasumasa Nishino	September 14, 1982 (aged 22)	cm / kg	17	0						

== Other pages ==
- (in Japanese) J. League official site
