= Yoshikiyo Kuboyama =

Japanese footballer

Yoshikiyo Kuboyama 久保山 由清
Personal information
- Full name: Yoshikiyo Kuboyama
- Date of birth: July 21, 1976 (age 50)
- Place of birth: Yaizu, Shizuoka, Japan
- Height: 1.71 m (5 ft 7 1/2 in)
- Position: Forward

Youth career
- 1992–1994: Shizuoka Gakuen High School

Senior career*
Years	Team	Apps	(Gls)
1995–1998	Yokohama Flügels	15	(4)
1999–2007	Shimizu S-Pulse	184	(30)
Total		199	(34)

Managerial career
- 2026-: FC Imabari
Medal record
Yokohama Flügels
Winner	Emperor's Cup	1998
Runner-up	Emperor's Cup	1997
Shimizu S-Pulse
Runner-up	J1 League	1999
Winner	Emperor's Cup	2001
Runner-up	Emperor's Cup	2000
Runner-up	Emperor's Cup	2005
- * Club domestic league appearances and goals

Yoshikiyo Kuboyama (久保山 由清, Kuboyama Yoshikiyo; born July 21, 1976) is a former Japanese football player.

== Playing career ==
Kuboyama was born in Yaizu on July 21, 1976. After graduating from Shizuoka Gakuen High School, he joined the Yokohama Flügels in 1995. Although he debuted during his first season, he could hardly play in the match until 1997. In late 1998, he became a regular player as forward and the club won the Emperor's Cup. At the final, he scored a goal against Shimizu S-Pulse. However the club was disbanded at the end of the 1998 season due to financial strain, and he moved to his local club Shimizu S-Pulse in 1999. He played as a regular player for a long time. In 1999 season, he scored 12 goals and the club won second place in the J1 League. The club won the 1999–2000 Asian Cup Winners' Cup and the 2001 Emperor's Cup. However he could not play at all in the match due to an injury in 2007 and he retired at the end of the 2007 season.

== Coaching career ==
After retirement, Kuboyama started his coaching career at Shimizu S-Pulse in 2008. He served as manager for the youth team until 2015. In 2016, he became a coach for top team.

== Club statistics ==
Club performance			League		Cup		League Cup		Continental		Total	
Season	Club	League	Apps	Goals	Apps	Goals	Apps	Goals	Apps	Goals	Apps	Goals
Japan			League		Emperor's Cup		J.League Cup		Asia		Total	
1995	Yokohama Flügels	J1 League	4	1	0	0	-		-		4	1
1996	Yokohama Flügels	J1 League	1	0	0	0	0	0	-		1	0
1997	Yokohama Flügels	J1 League	0	0	0	0	0	0	-		0	0
1998	Yokohama Flügels	J1 League	10	3	5	2	0	0	-		15	5
1999	Shimizu S-Pulse	J1 League	27	12	3	2	4	0	-		34	14
2000	Shimizu S-Pulse	J1 League	29	3	4	0	5	2	-		38	5
2001	Shimizu S-Pulse	J1 League	19	5	5	0	1	0	-		25	5
2002	Shimizu S-Pulse	J1 League	16	1	0	0	5	3	1	0	22	4
2003	Shimizu S-Pulse	J1 League	23	1	0	0	3	0	1	0	27	1
2004	Shimizu S-Pulse	J1 League	24	4	1	0	6	4	-		31	8
2005	Shimizu S-Pulse	J1 League	24	3	4	4	7	1	-		35	8
2006	Shimizu S-Pulse	J1 League	22	1	1	0	5	1	-		28	2
2007	Shimizu S-Pulse	J1 League	0	0	0	0	0	0	-		0	0
Total			199	34	23	8	36	11	2	0	260	53
