= Masanori Sanada =

Japanese footballer

Masanori Sanada 真田 雅則
Personal information
- Full name: Masanori Sanada
- Date of birth: March 6, 1968
- Place of birth: Shizuoka, Japan
- Date of death: September 6, 2011 (aged 43)
- Place of death: Shizuoka, Japan
- Height: 1.80 m (5 ft 11 in)
- Position: Goalkeeper

Youth career
- 1983–1985: Shimizu Commercial High School

College career
Years	Team	Apps	(Gls)
1986–1989	Juntendo University		

Senior career*
Years	Team	Apps	(Gls)
1990–1992	All Nippon Airways	36	(0)
1992–2004	Shimizu S-Pulse	243	(0)
Total		279	(0)
Medal record
Shimizu S-Pulse
Runner-up	J1 League	1999
Winner	J.League Cup	1996
Runner-up	J.League Cup	1992
Runner-up	J.League Cup	1993
Winner	Emperor's Cup	2001
Runner-up	Emperor's Cup	1998
Runner-up	Emperor's Cup	2000
- * Club domestic league appearances and goals

Masanori Sanada (真田 雅則, Sanada Masanori; March 6, 1968 – September 6, 2011) was a Japanese football player.

== Club career ==
Sanada was born in Shizuoka on March 6, 1968. After graduating from Juntendo University, he joined All Nippon Airways in 1990. He played as regular goalkeeper from first season. In 1992, he moved to new club Shimizu S-Pulse based in his local. Although he played in all matches in 1992, he battles with Sidmar for the position from 1993. After Sidmar retired end of 1995 season, Sanada became completely regular goalkeeper. The club won the champion 1996 J.League Cup their first title. In 1999, the club won the 2nd place J1 League and he was elected Best XI. In Asia, the club won the champions 1999–2000 Asian Cup Winners' Cup their first Asian champions. From 2001, his opportunity to play decreased behind young goalkeepers Keisuke Hada and Takaya Kurokawa. He retired end of 2004 season.

== National team career ==
In 1988, when Sanada was a Juntendo University student, he was selected Japan national "B team" for 1988 Asian Cup. At this competition, he played 3 games. However, Japan Football Association don't count as Japan national team match because this Japan team was "B team" not "top team"

== Coaching career ==
After retirement, Sanada became a goalkeeper coach at Shimizu S-Pulse in 2005. In 2008, he moved to JEF United Chiba. In 2011, he returned to S-Pulse. However he rested for health problem from September 2.

On September 6, 2011, Sanada died of heart failure in Shizuoka at the age of 43.

== Club statistics ==
Club performance			League		Cup		League Cup		Continental		Total	
Season	Club	League	Apps	Goals	Apps	Goals	Apps	Goals	Apps	Goals	Apps	Goals
Japan			League		Emperor's Cup		J.League Cup		Asia		Total	
1990/91	All Nippon Airways	JSL Division 1	20	0			4	0	-		24	0
1991/92	All Nippon Airways	JSL Division 1	16	0			1	0	-		17	0
1992	Shimizu S-Pulse	J1 League	-		3	0	11	0	-		14	0
1993	Shimizu S-Pulse	J1 League	19	0	0	0	1	0	-		20	0
1994	Shimizu S-Pulse	J1 League	14	0	1	0	0	0	-		15	0
1995	Shimizu S-Pulse	J1 League	34	0	1	0	-		-		35	0
1996	Shimizu S-Pulse	J1 League	30	0	3	0	16	0	-		49	0
1997	Shimizu S-Pulse	J1 League	32	0	3	0	6	0	-		41	0
1998	Shimizu S-Pulse	J1 League	34	0	5	0	5	0	-		44	0
1999	Shimizu S-Pulse	J1 League	30	0	3	0	4	0	-		37	0
2000	Shimizu S-Pulse	J1 League	29	0	5	0	5	0	-		39	0
2001	Shimizu S-Pulse	J1 League	4	0	0	0	1	0	-		5	0
2002	Shimizu S-Pulse	J1 League	13	0	0	0	3	0	1	0	17	0
2003	Shimizu S-Pulse	J1 League	4	0	4	0	1	0	-		9	0
2004	Shimizu S-Pulse	J1 League	0	0	1	0	1	0	-		2	0
Total			279	0	29	0	59	0	1	0	368	0
