= Jun Muramatsu =

Japanese footballer

Jun Muramatsu 村松 潤
Personal information
- Full name: Jun Muramatsu
- Date of birth: April 10, 1982 (age 44)
- Place of birth: Shizuoka, Japan
- Height: 1.70 m (5 ft 7 in)
- Position: Midfielder

Youth career
- 1998–2000: Shimizu S-Pulse

Senior career*
Years	Team	Apps	(Gls)
2001–2005	Shimizu S-Pulse	23	(0)
2006	Vegalta Sendai	1	(0)
2007–2009	Mito HollyHock	102	(2)
2010	Giravanz Kitakyushu	12	(0)
Total		138	(2)
Medal record
Shimizu S-Pulse
Winner	Emperor's Cup	2001
Runner-up	Emperor's Cup	2005
- * Club domestic league appearances and goals

Jun Muramatsu (村松 潤, Muramatsu Jun; born April 10, 1982) is a former Japanese football player.

== Playing career ==
Muramatsu was born in Shizuoka on April 10, 1982. He joined J1 League club Shimizu S-Pulse from youth team in 2001. He debuted in 2002 and his opportunity to play as defensive midfielder increased until 2004. However he could hardly play in the match 2005. In 2006, he moved to J2 League club Vegalta Sendai. However he could hardly play in the match. In 2007, he moved to J2 club Mito HollyHock. He became a regular player as defensive midfielder. In 2010, he moved to newly was promoted to J2 League club, Giravanz Kitakyushu. However he could not play many matches. In 2011, he moved to FC Gifu reserve team. He retired end of 2012 season.

== Career statistics ==
Appearances and goals by club, season and competition
Club	Season	League			Emperor's Cup		J.League Cup		Asia		Total	
Club	Season	Division	Apps	Goals	Apps	Goals	Apps	Goals	Apps	Goals	Apps	Goals
Shimizu S-Pulse	2001	J1 League	0	0	0	0	0	0	—		0	0
Shimizu S-Pulse	2002	J1 League	6	0	0	0	4	0	—		10	0
Shimizu S-Pulse	2003	J1 League	6	0	0	0	0	0	3	0	9	0
Shimizu S-Pulse	2004	J1 League	10	0	0	0	3	0	—		13	0
Shimizu S-Pulse	2005	J1 League	1	0	0	0	1	0	—		2	0
Vegalta Sendai	2006	J2 League	1	0	0	0	—		—		1	0
Mito HollyHock	2007	J2 League	35	1	2	1	—		—		37	2
Mito HollyHock	2008	J2 League	31	1	2	1	—		—		33	2
Mito HollyHock	2009	J2 League	36	0	1	0	—		—		37	0
Giravanz Kitakyushu	2010	J2 League	12	0	0	0	—		—		12	0
Career total			138	2	5	2	8	0	3	0	154	4
