= Toshihide Saito =

Japanese footballer and manager

Toshihide Saito 斉藤 俊秀
Personal information
- Date of birth: April 20, 1973 (age 53)
- Place of birth: Shizuoka, Shizuoka, Japan
- Height: 1.82 m (6 ft 0 in)
- Position: Defender

Youth career
- 1989–1991: Shimizu Higashi High School

College career
Years	Team	Apps	(Gls)
1992–1995	Waseda University		

Senior career*
Years	Team	Apps	(Gls)
1996–2006	Shimizu S-Pulse	244	(16)
2007–2008	Shonan Bellmare	84	(4)
2009–2013	Fujieda MYFC	57	(6)
Total		385	(26)

International career
1996–1999	Japan	17	(0)

Managerial career
- 2010–2013: Fujieda MYFC (player/manager)
- 2014–2017: Japan U17 (assistant coach)
- 2018–: Japan (assistant coach)
Medal record
Shimizu S-Pulse
Runner-up	J1 League	1999
Winner	J.League Cup	1996
Winner	Emperor's Cup	2001
Runner-up	Emperor's Cup	1998
Runner-up	Emperor's Cup	2000
Runner-up	Emperor's Cup	2005
- * Club domestic league appearances and goals

Toshihide Saito (斉藤 俊秀, Saitō Toshihide; born April 20, 1973) is a Japanese former football player and manager. He currently works as an assistant coach for the Japan national team.

== Club career ==
Saito was born in Shizuoka on April 20, 1973. After graduating from Waseda University, he joined his local club Shimizu S-Pulse in 1996. He played as regular player from first season. At 1996 J.League Cup, the club won the champions and he was selected New Hero awards. End of 1996 season, he was also selected J.League Rookie of the Year awards. The club also won the 2nd place at 1998 Emperor's Cup and 1999 J1 League, he was also selected Best Eleven in 1999. In 2000s, the club won 1999–2000 Asian Cup Winners' Cup and 2001 Emperor's Cup. In 2006, he moved to J2 League club Shonan Bellmare and played in two seasons. In 2009, he was appointed playing manager of Prefectural Leagues side Fujieda MYFC. After promotion to the Japan Football League in 2011 and acceptance into J3 League for the 2014 season, Saito decided to leave the club.

== International career ==
Saito was capped 17 times for the Japan national team between 1996 and 1999. His first international appearance came on August 25, 1996, in a friendly against Uruguay at Osaka Nagai Stadium. He was an unused substitute at the 1998 FIFA World Cup. He also played at 1999 Copa América.

== Career statistics ==
=== Club ===
Appearances and goals by club, season and competition
Club	Season	League			Emperor's Cup		J.League Cup		Total	
Club	Season	Division	Apps	Goals	Apps	Goals	Apps	Goals	Apps	Goals
Shimizu S-Pulse	1996	J1 League	29	2	3	0	16	0	48	2
Shimizu S-Pulse	1997	J1 League	22	2	3	0	0	0	25	2
Shimizu S-Pulse	1998	J1 League	33	0	5	0	1	0	39	0
Shimizu S-Pulse	1999	J1 League	28	3	3	0	4	0	35	3
Shimizu S-Pulse	2000	J1 League	28	3	5	0	6	0	39	3
Shimizu S-Pulse	2001	J1 League	20	1	0	0	2	0	22	1
Shimizu S-Pulse	2002	J1 League	20	1	2	0	1	0	23	1
Shimizu S-Pulse	2003	J1 League	2	0	0	0	0	0	2	0
Shimizu S-Pulse	2004	J1 League	26	3	1	0	6	0	33	3
Shimizu S-Pulse	2005	J1 League	28	0	0	0	7	1	35	1
Shimizu S-Pulse	2006	J1 League	8	1	0	0	3	0	11	1
Shonan Bellmare	2007	J2 League	46	4	2	0	—		48	4
Shonan Bellmare	2008	J2 League	38	0	1	0	—		39	0
Fujieda MYFC	2009	Prefectural Leagues	11	3	—		—		11	3
Fujieda MYFC	2010	Regional Leagues	15	2	—		—		15	2
Fujieda MYFC	2011	Regional Leagues	5	0	—		—		5	0
Fujieda MYFC	2012	Football League	11	0	0	0	—		11	0
Fujieda MYFC	2013	Football League	15	1	1	0	—		16	1
Career total			385	26	28	0	46	1	459	27

=== International ===
Appearances and goals by national team and year
National team	Year	Apps	Goals
Japan	1996	2	0
Japan	1997	7	0
Japan	1998	4	0
Japan	1999	4	0
Total		17	0

== Honors ==
- Emperor's Cup: 2001
- J - League Cup: 1996
- Japanese Super Cup: 2001, 2002
- Asian Cup Winner's Cup: 2000

Individual

- J.League Rookie of the Year: 1996
- J.League Best XI: 1999
