= Kohei Hiramatsu =

Japanese footballer

Kohei Hiramatsu 平松 康平
Personal information
- Full name: Kohei Hiramatsu
- Date of birth: April 19, 1980 (age 46)
- Place of birth: Shizuoka, Japan
- Height: 1.70 m (5 ft 7 in)
- Position: Midfielder

Youth career
- 1996–1998: Shimizu S-Pulse

Senior career*
Years	Team	Apps	(Gls)
1998–2007	Shimizu S-Pulse	138	(11)
2008	FC Ryukyu	11	(1)
2009–2010	Fujieda MYFC		
Total		149	(12)
Medal record
Shimizu S-Pulse
Runner-up	J1 League	1999
Winner	Emperor's Cup	2001
Runner-up	Emperor's Cup	1998
Runner-up	Emperor's Cup	2000
Runner-up	Emperor's Cup	2005
Representing Japan
AFC U-19 Championship
Silver medal – second place	1998 Thailand
- * Club domestic league appearances and goals

Kohei Hiramatsu (平松 康平, Hiramatsu Kōhei; born April 19, 1980) is a former Japanese football player.

== Playing career ==
Hiramatsu was born in Shizuoka on April 19, 1980. He joined J1 League club Shimizu S-Pulse from youth team in 1998. He played many matches as offensive midfielder from 2000 season. The club won the champions 1999–2000 Asian Cup Winners' Cup and 2001 Emperor's Cup. However his opportunity to play decreased from 2005 and left the club end of 2007 season. In April 2008, he moved to Japan Football League club FC Ryukyu and played in 1 season. After 9 months blank, In October 2009, he joined Regional Leagues club Shizuoka FC (later Fujieda MYFC). He retired end of 2010 season.

== Club statistics ==
Club performance			League		Cup		League Cup		Continental		Total	
Season	Club	League	Apps	Goals	Apps	Goals	Apps	Goals	Apps	Goals	Apps	Goals
Japan			League		Emperor's Cup		J.League Cup		Asia		Total	
1998	Shimizu S-Pulse	J1 League	5	0	4	1	3	0	-		12	1
1999	Shimizu S-Pulse	J1 League	1	0	1	0	2	0	-		4	0
2000	Shimizu S-Pulse	J1 League	20	2	3	0	5	1	-		28	3
2001	Shimizu S-Pulse	J1 League	30	4	5	1	2	0	-		37	5
2002	Shimizu S-Pulse	J1 League	27	2	2	0	8	1	4	0	41	3
2003	Shimizu S-Pulse	J1 League	14	1	4	1	1	0	2	0	21	2
2004	Shimizu S-Pulse	J1 League	27	2	1	0	7	0	-		35	2
2005	Shimizu S-Pulse	J1 League	8	0	4	0	2	1	-		14	1
2006	Shimizu S-Pulse	J1 League	6	0	2	0	2	0	-		10	0
2007	Shimizu S-Pulse	J1 League	0	0	0	0	3	0	-		3	0
2008	FC Ryukyu	Football League	11	1	-		-		-		11	1
Total			149	12	26	3	35	3	6	0	216	18
