= Daisuke Ichikawa =

Japanese footballer

Daisuke Ichikawa 市川 大祐
Personal information
- Date of birth: May 14, 1980 (age 46)
- Place of birth: Shizuoka, Japan
- Height: 1.81 m (5 ft 11 in)
- Position: Defender

Youth career
- 1996–1997: Shimizu S-Pulse

Senior career*
Years	Team	Apps	(Gls)
1997–2010	Shimizu S-Pulse	325	(12)
2011	Ventforet Kofu	22	(0)
2012	Mito HollyHock	32	(1)
2013–2014	Fujieda MYFC	14	(0)
2015	FC Imabari	1	(0)
2016	Vanraure Hachinohe	20	(2)
Total		414	(15)

International career
1998–2002	Japan	10	(0)
Medal record
Shimizu S-Pulse
Runner-up	J1 League	1999
Runner-up	J.League Cup	2008
Winner	Emperor's Cup	2001
Runner-up	Emperor's Cup	1998
Runner-up	Emperor's Cup	2000
Runner-up	Emperor's Cup	2005
Runner-up	Emperor's Cup	2010
Representing Japan
AFC U-19 Championship
Silver medal – second place	1998 Thailand
- * Club domestic league appearances and goals

Daisuke Ichikawa (市川 大祐, Ichikawa Daisuke; born May 14, 1980) is a Japanese former professional footballer who played as a defender. He played for the Japan national team.

== Club career ==
Ichikawa is a product of Shimizu S-Pulses youth system. He played as right side-back and right midfielder. He made his J1 League debut on March 21, 1998, against Consadole Sapporo. He scored his first league goal against on November 14, 1998, against JEF United Ichihara. He was still a high school student at that time. He was instrumental in Shimizu winning the second stage of 1999 J1 League, the 1999–2000 Asian Cup Winners' Cup and the 2001 Emperor's Cup. The side attack from Ichikawa on the right and Alessandro Santos on the left was Shimizu's main weapon during the period. He left the club end of 2010 season. Toward end of his career, he played for Ventforet Kofu (2011), Mito HollyHock (2012), Fujieda MYFC (2013–14), FC Imabari (2015) and Vanraure Hachinohe (2016). He retired end of 2016 season.

== International career ==
Ichikawa represented Japan national team at several underage levels. He made his first full international debut on April 1, 1998, against South Korea when he was 17 year and 322 days old, which made him the youngest player who represented Japan. Ichikawa was short-listed for the 1998 FIFA World Cup, but national coach Takeshi Okada dropped him together with Kazuyoshi Miura and Tsuyoshi Kitazawa at the final training camp in Nyon, Switzerland.

In March 2002, he was elected Japan for the first time in four years by Philippe Troussier. He was also chosen for the 2002 FIFA World Cup finals and played three games. Against Tunisia in the group stage, his cross was met by Hidetoshi Nakata who headed home to score Japan's second goal. He was capped ten times without scoring between 1998 and 2002.

== Career statistics ==
=== Club ===
Appearances and goals by club, season and competition
Club	Season	League			Emperor's Cup		J.League Cup		AFC		Total	
Club	Season	Division	Apps	Goals	Apps	Goals	Apps	Goals	Apps	Goals	Apps	Goals
Shimizu S-Pulse	1997	J1 League	0	0	1	0	0	0	–		1	0
Shimizu S-Pulse	1998	J1 League	20	1	3	0	0	0	–		23	1
Shimizu S-Pulse	1999	J1 League	22	0	3	1	4	0	–		29	1
Shimizu S-Pulse	2000	J1 League	26	2	4	0	6	1	–		36	3
Shimizu S-Pulse	2001	J1 League	30	2	1	0	2	0	–		33	2
Shimizu S-Pulse	2002	J1 League	30	1	3	0	2	0	2	0	37	1
Shimizu S-Pulse	2003	J1 League	23	0	0	0	4	0	0	0	27	0
Shimizu S-Pulse	2004	J1 League	3	0	0	0	1	0	–		4	0
Shimizu S-Pulse	2005	J1 League	34	0	3	1	5	0	–		42	1
Shimizu S-Pulse	2006	J1 League	31	1	3	0	5	0	–		39	1
Shimizu S-Pulse	2007	J1 League	33	4	3	1	6	1	–		42	6
Shimizu S-Pulse	2008	J1 League	27	0	2	0	5	0	–		34	0
Shimizu S-Pulse	2009	J1 League	25	1	5	0	5	0	–		35	1
Shimizu S-Pulse	2010	J1 League	21	0	2	0	4	0	–		27	0
Ventforet Kofu	2011	J1 League	22	0	0	0	1	0	–		23	0
Mito HollyHock	2012	J2 League	32	1	1	0	–		–		33	1
Fujieda MYFC	2013	Japan Football League	8	0	1	0	–		–		9	0
Fujieda MYFC	2014	J3 League	6	0	1	0	–		–		7	0
FC Imabari	2015	Regional Leagues	1	0	0	0	–		–		1	0
Vanraure Hachinohe	2016	Japan Football League	20	2	0	0	–		–		20	2
Career total			414	15	34	3	45	2	2	0	495	20

=== International ===
Appearances and goals by national team and year
National team	Year	Apps	Goals
Japan	1998	1	0
Japan	1999	0	0
Japan	2000	0	0
Japan	2001	0	0
Japan	2002	9	0
Total		10	0
