= Keisuke Ota (footballer, born 1981) =

Japanese footballer

Keisuke Ota 太田 圭輔
Personal information
- Date of birth: July 23, 1981 (age 45)
- Place of birth: Hamamatsu, Japan
- Height: 1.69 m (5 ft 7 in)
- Position: Midfielder

Youth career
- 1997–1999: Shimizu S-Pulse

Senior career*
Years	Team	Apps	(Gls)
2000–2007	Shimizu S-Pulse	60	(4)
2001	→ Ventforet Kofu (loan)	43	(11)
2007–2009	Kashiwa Reysol	57	(9)
2009–2011	JEF United Chiba	48	(0)
2012–2013	Tokushima Vortis	31	(0)
2014–2015	FC Gifu	38	(1)
Total		277	(25)
Medal record
Shimizu S-Pulse
Runner-up	Emperor's Cup	2000
Runner-up	Emperor's Cup	2005
Kashiwa Reysol
Runner-up	Emperor's Cup	2008
- * Club domestic league appearances and goals

Keisuke Ota (太田 圭輔, Ota Keisuke; born July 23, 1981) is a Japanese former professional footballer who played as a midfielder. His younger brother Yoshiaki Ota is also footballer.

== Career ==
Ota was born in Hamamatsu on July 23, 1981. He joined J1 League club Shimizu S-Pulse from youth team in 2000. However he could not play at all in the match. In 2001, he moved to J2 League club Ventforet Kofu on loan. He became a regular player as forward and scored 11 goals which is top scorer in the club. In 2002, he returned to Shimizu S-Pulse. He debuted in J1 League in 2002 and his opportunity to play increased in 2003. In 2004, he became a regular player as right midfielder. However he could hardly play in the match from 2006. In July 2007, he moved to Kashiwa Reysol. He became a regular player as right midfielder immediately and he played in all 34 matches in 2008. However his opportunity to play decreased in 2009. In July 2009, he moved to JEF United Chiba. Although he played many matches in 2009, the club was relegated to J2 first time in the club history from 2010. Although he became a regular player, he played many matches until 2011. In 2012, he moved to J2 club Tokushima Vortis. He played many matches in two seasons and the club was promoted to J1 first time in the club history from 2014. However he moved to J2 club FC Gifu in 2014 without playing J1. Although he played many matches in 2014, his opportunity to play decreased in 2015 and he retired end of 2015 season.

== Career statistics ==
Appearances and goals by club, season and competition
Club	Season	League			Emperor's Cup		J.League Cup		Asia		Total	
Club	Season	Division	Apps	Goals	Apps	Goals	Apps	Goals	Apps	Goals	Apps	Goals
Shimizu S-Pulse	2000	J1 League	0	0	0	0	0	0	–		0	0
Shimizu S-Pulse	2002	J1 League	2	0	0	0	6	1	3	0	11	1
Shimizu S-Pulse	2003	J1 League	8	0	4	0	1	1	–		13	1
Shimizu S-Pulse	2004	J1 League	29	1	1	0	7	0	–		37	1
Shimizu S-Pulse	2005	J1 League	17	3	1	0	2	1	–		20	4
Shimizu S-Pulse	2006	J1 League	2	0	0	0	2	1	–		4	1
Shimizu S-Pulse	2007	J1 League	2	0	0	0	2	2	–		4	2
Ventforet Kofu (loan)	2001	J2 League	43	11	3	2	2	0	–		48	13
Kashiwa Reysol	2007	J1 League	16	3	1	0	0	0	0	0	17	3
Kashiwa Reysol	2008	J1 League	34	6	3	0	6	1	–		43	7
Kashiwa Reysol	2009	J1 League	7	0	0	0	3	0	–		10	0
JEF United Chiba	2009	J1 League	11	0	3	0	0	0	–		14	0
JEF United Chiba	2010	J2 League	18	0	1	0	–		–		19	0
JEF United Chiba	2011	J2 League	19	0	0	0	–		–		19	0
Tokushima Vortis	2012	J2 League	20	0	2	1	–		–		22	1
Tokushima Vortis	2013	J2 League	11	0	0	0	–		–		11	0
FC Gifu	2014	J2 League	26	1	0	0	–		–		26	1
FC Gifu	2015	J2 League	12	0	1	1	–		–		13	1
Career total			277	25	20	4	31	7	3	0	331	36
