= 2002 Shimizu S-Pulse season =

Shimizu S-Pulse
2002 season
- Manager: Zdravko Zemunović
- Stadium: Nihondaira Sports Stadium
- J. League 1: 8th
- Emperor's Cup: Quarterfinals
- J. League Cup: Semifinals
- Top goalscorer: Alessandro Santos (9)
Home colours	Away colours

The 2002 S-Pulse season was S-Pulse's eleventh season in existence and their tenth season in the J1 League. The club also competed in the Emperor's Cup and the J.League Cup. The team finished the season eighth in the league.

== Competitions ==
Competitions	Position
J. League 1	8th / 16 clubs
Emperor's Cup	Quarterfinals
J. League Cup	Semifinals

== Domestic results ==
=== J. League 1 ===
Match	Date	Venue	Opponents	Score
1-1	2002.3.3	Nihondaira Sports Stadium	Vissel Kobe	1-0 a.e.t. (sudden death)
1-2	2002.3.9	Kashima Soccer Stadium	Kashima Antlers	1-0
1-3	2002.3.16	Nihondaira Sports Stadium	Urawa Red Diamonds	2-1
1-4	2002.3.31	Nihondaira Sports Stadium	F.C. Tokyo	2-1 a.e.t. (sudden death)
1-5	2002.4.6	Nihondaira Sports Stadium	Nagoya Grampus Eight	0-4
1-6	2002.4.14	Ichihara Seaside Stadium	JEF United Ichihara	1-1 a.e.t.
1-7	2002.4.21	Hiroshima Big Arch	Sanfrecce Hiroshima	0-0 a.e.t.
1-8	2002.7.14	Nihondaira Sports Stadium	Gamba Osaka	1-4
1-9	2002.7.20	Nihondaira Sports Stadium	Vegalta Sendai	1-0
1-10	2002.7.24	Yamaha Stadium	Júbilo Iwata	1-3
1-11	2002.7.27	Nihondaira Sports Stadium	Tokyo Verdy 1969	1-2
1-12	2002.8.3	Sapporo Dome	Consadole Sapporo	3-2
1-13	2002.8.7	Nihondaira Sports Stadium	Kashiwa Reysol	2-1
1-14	2002.8.10	Nishikyogoku Athletic Stadium	Kyoto Purple Sanga	1-0
1-15	2002.8.17	National Olympic Stadium (Tokyo)	Yokohama F. Marinos	0-0 a.e.t.
2-1	2002.9.1	Mizuho Athletic Stadium	Nagoya Grampus Eight	0-3
2-2	2002.9.7	Nihondaira Sports Stadium	JEF United Ichihara	1-0
2-3	2002.9.14	Osaka Expo '70 Stadium	Gamba Osaka	1-2 a.e.t. (sudden death)
2-4	2002.9.18	Nihondaira Sports Stadium	Júbilo Iwata	0-2
2-5	2002.9.21	Sendai Stadium	Vegalta Sendai	1-3
2-6	2002.9.28	Saitama Stadium 2002	Urawa Red Diamonds	1-2 a.e.t. (sudden death)
2-7	2002.10.5	Nihondaira Sports Stadium	Consadole Sapporo	3-0
2-8	2002.10.12	Tokyo Stadium	Tokyo Verdy 1969	0-2
2-9	2002.10.19	Shizuoka Stadium	Kyoto Purple Sanga	2-1
2-11	2002.10.26	Nihondaira Sports Stadium	Sanfrecce Hiroshima	2-1 a.e.t. (sudden death)
2-10	2002.10.30	Hitachi Kashiwa Soccer Stadium	Kashiwa Reysol	0-1
2-12	2002.11.9	Nihondaira Sports Stadium	Yokohama F. Marinos	1-2
2-13	2002.11.16	Tokyo Stadium	F.C. Tokyo	2-1
2-14	2002.11.24	Nihondaira Sports Stadium	Kashima Antlers	2-1
2-15	2002.11.30	Kobe Universiade Memorial Stadium	Vissel Kobe	0-3

=== Emperor's Cup ===
15 December 2002 Third round	Shimizu S-Pulse	4–2	Sagan Tosu	Shimizu-ku, Shizuoka
	Sawanobori 47', 61'; Baron 50'; Yoshida 90'	Report	Koishi 80', 90'	Stadium: Nihondaira Sports Stadium; Attendance: 4,764

22 December 2002 Fourth round	Shimizu S-Pulse	3–2 (a.e.t.)	Shonan Bellmare	Shimizu-ku, Shizuoka
	Baron 12'; Ahn Jung-hwan 79' 120'	Report	Tokisaki 8'; Toda 81'	Stadium: Nihondaira Sports Stadium; Attendance: 6,753

25 December 2002 Quarterfinals	Shimizu S-Pulse	1–3	Sanfrecce Hiroshima	Shimizu-ku, Shizuoka
	Baron 17'	Report	Kubo 31' (pen.), 62'; Morisaki 84'	Stadium: Nihondaira Sports Stadium; Attendance: 6,835

=== J. League Cup ===
Group stage

Pos	Team	Pld	W	D	L	GF	GA	GD	Pts	Qualification
1	FC Tokyo	6	4	1	1	8	3	+5	13	Quarterfinals
2	Shimizu S-Pulse	6	4	0	2	9	8	+1	12	Quarterfinals
3	Tokyo Verdy 1969	6	2	1	3	10	10	0	7	
4	Vissel Kobe	6	0	2	4	5	11	−6	2	

Source: rsssf.com

27 April 2002 1	FC Tokyo	3–0	Shimizu S-Pulse	Tokyo
13:00	Miyazawa 19'; Kelly 44'; Fukuda 78'	Report	Koga (yellow card) 34'	Stadium: Komazawa Olympic Park Stadium; Attendance: 11,393; Referee: Tetsuya Hamana

30 April 2002 2	Shimizu S-Pulse	2–1	Vissel Kobe	Shizuoka, Shizuoka
19:00	Baron 16' (yellow card) 34'; Sawanobori (yellow card) 35' (goal) 76'	Report	Daniel (yellow card) 63'; Jo 70'; Yoshimura (yellow card) 79'	Stadium: Kusanagi Athletic Stadium; Attendance: 6,946; Referee: Hiroyuki Umemoto

3 May 2002 3	Tokyo Verdy 1969	2–0	Shimizu S-Pulse	Tokyo
15:00	Edmundo (yellow card) 4' (goal) 79'; Hiramoto 47'	Report		Stadium: Tokyo Stadium; Attendance: 7,561; Referee: Kazuhiko Matsumura

6 May 2002 4	Shimizu S-Pulse	3–1	Tokyo Verdy 1969	Shizuoka, Shizuoka
15:04	Baron 41'; Sawanobori 57'; Ota 89'	Report	Yamada 12'	Stadium: Kusanagi Athletic Stadium; Attendance: 9,681; Referee: Yoshitsugu Katayama

9 May 2002 5	Vissel Kobe	0–2	Shimizu S-Pulse	Kobe
19:00	Ataliba (yellow card) 11'	Report	Sawanobori 19'; Pecelj (yellow card) 26'; Unknown 77' (o.g.); Oenoki (yellow card) 78'	Stadium: Universiade Memorial Stadium; Attendance: 2,844; Referee: Akio Okutani

12 May 2002 6	Shimizu S-Pulse	2–1	FC Tokyo	Shimizu-ku, Shizuoka
13:04	Pecelj (yellow card) 8'; Kuboyama 22', 32'; Morioka (yellow card) 29'; Hiramatsu (yellow card) 55'	Report	Yamao (yellow card) 57'; Komine (yellow card) 77' (yellow-red card) 88'; Fukuda 84' (yellow card) 87'	Stadium: Nihondaira Sports Stadium; Attendance: 11,390; Referee: Toshimitsu Yoshida

Final stage

4 September 2002 Quarterfinals	JEF United Ichihara	0–3	Shimizu S-Pulse	Ichihara
19:03	Muto (yellow card) 41'; Nakanishi (yellow card) 57' (red card) 85'	Report	Hiramatsu 27'; Alex 55'; Ikeda (yellow card) 61'; Kuboyama 89'	Stadium: Ichihara Stadium; Attendance: 3,345; Referee: Toru Kamikawa

2 October 2002 Semifinals	Kashima Antlers	2–1 (a.e.t.)	Shimizu S-Pulse	Kashima
19:00	Unknown 25' (o.g.); Hasegawa 106'	Report	Pecelj (yellow card) 65'; Alex 67'; Toda (yellow card) 76'	Stadium: Kashima Soccer Stadium; Attendance: 9,102; Referee: Masayoshi Okada

== International results ==
=== Asian Cup Winners' Cup ===
Shimizu S-Pulse qualified for this tournament as runners-up of the 2000 Emperor's Cup, as the winners (Kashima Antlers) have already qualified to the Asian Club Championship as the league winners.

Second round

21 November 2001 1st Leg	South China (Hong Kong)	3–2	(Japan) Shimizu S-Pulse	Hong Kong
		Report		Stadium: Happy Valley Racecourse

28 November 2001 2nd Leg	Shimizu S-Pulse (Japan)	6–0 (8–3 agg.)	(Hong Kong) South China	Shizuoka, Japan
		Report		Stadium: Nihondaira Sports Stadium

Quarterfinals

13 February 2002 1st Leg	Jeonbuk Hyundai Motors (South Korea)	1–1	(Japan) Shimizu S-Pulse	Jeonju, South Korea
		Report		Stadium: Jeonju World Cup Stadium

20 February 2002 2nd Leg	Shimizu S-Pulse (Japan)	2–2 (3–3a agg.)	(South Korea) Jeonbuk Hyundai Motors	Shizuoka, Japan
		Report		Stadium: Nihondaira Sports Stadium

=== AFC Champions League (qualification) ===
Shimizu S-Pulse entered the qualifying rounds as winners of the 2001 Emperor's Cup.

Third qualifying round

9 October 2002 1st Leg	Shimizu S-Pulse (Japan)	7–0	(Maldives) New Radiant	Shizuoka, Japan
		Report		Stadium: Nihondaira Sports Stadium

23 October 2002 2nd Leg	New Radiant (Maldives)	0–0 (0–7 agg.)	(Japan) Shimizu S-Pulse	Malé, Maldives
		Report		Stadium: National Football Stadium

Fourth qualifying round

12 November 2002 1st Leg	South China (Hong Kong)	0–5	(Japan) Shimizu S-Pulse	Hong Kong
20:00		Report		Stadium: Happy Valley Racecourse

27 November 2002 2nd Leg	Shimizu S-Pulse (Japan)	3–1 (8–1 agg.)	(Hong Kong) South China	Shizuoka, Japan
19:00		Report		Stadium: Nihondaira Sports Stadium

Shimizu S-Pulse qualified to the 2002–03 AFC Champions League.

== Player statistics ==
No.	Pos.	Player	D.o.B. (Age)	Height / Weight	J. League 1		Emperor's Cup		J. League Cup		Total	
No.	Pos.	Player	D.o.B. (Age)	Height / Weight	Apps	Goals	Apps	Goals	Apps	Goals	Apps	Goals
1	GK	Masanori Sanada	March 6, 1968 (aged 33)	cm / kg	13	0						
2	DF	Toshihide Saito	April 20, 1973 (aged 28)	cm / kg	20	1						
3	DF	Takuma Koga	April 30, 1969 (aged 32)	cm / kg	16	0						
4	MF	Kazuyuki Toda	December 30, 1977 (aged 24)	cm / kg	22	1						
5	MF	Yasuhiro Yoshida	July 14, 1969 (aged 32)	cm / kg	27	1						
6	MF	Katsumi Oenoki	April 3, 1965 (aged 36)	cm / kg	18	0						
7	MF	Teruyoshi Ito	August 31, 1974 (aged 27)	cm / kg	22	0						
8	MF	Alessandro Santos	July 20, 1977 (aged 24)	cm / kg	29	9						
9	FW	Baron	January 19, 1974 (aged 28)	cm / kg	28	6						
10	MF	Masaaki Sawanobori	January 12, 1970 (aged 32)	cm / kg	29	3						
11	DF	Ryuzo Morioka	October 7, 1975 (aged 26)	cm / kg	3	1						
12	DF	Srđan Pecelj	March 12, 1975 (aged 26)	cm / kg	7	2						
13	MF	Kohei Hiramatsu	April 19, 1980 (aged 21)	cm / kg	27	2						
14	DF	Tsuyoshi Tanikawa	April 25, 1980 (aged 21)	cm / kg	0	0						
15	FW	Yoshikiyo Kuboyama	July 21, 1976 (aged 25)	cm / kg	16	1						
16	GK	Keisuke Hada	February 20, 1978 (aged 24)	cm / kg	6	0						
17	FW	Takayuki Yokoyama	December 22, 1972 (aged 29)	cm / kg	11	0						
18	FW	Kotaro Yamazaki	October 19, 1978 (aged 23)	cm / kg	0	0						
19	DF	Shohei Ikeda	April 27, 1981 (aged 20)	cm / kg	27	0						
20	GK	Takaya Kurokawa	April 7, 1981 (aged 20)	cm / kg	11	0						
21	DF	Kazumichi Takagi	November 21, 1980 (aged 21)	cm / kg	0	0						
22	MF	Keisuke Ota	July 23, 1981 (aged 20)	cm / kg	2	0						
23	MF	Juninho	July 7, 1982 (aged 19)	cm / kg	0	0						
24	GK	Satoshi Asayama	April 25, 1983 (aged 18)	cm / kg	0	0						
25	DF	Daisuke Ichikawa	May 14, 1980 (aged 21)	cm / kg	30	1						
26	DF	Alair	January 27, 1982 (aged 20)	cm / kg	0	0						
26	FW	Ahn Jung-Hwan	January 27, 1976 (aged 26)	cm / kg	10	3						
27	MF	Jun Muramatsu	April 10, 1982 (aged 19)	cm / kg	6	0						
28	MF	Hayato Suzuki	May 13, 1982 (aged 19)	cm / kg	0	0						
29	DF	Kazuki Tsuda	July 26, 1982 (aged 19)	cm / kg	0	0						
30	MF	Jumpei Takaki	September 1, 1982 (aged 19)	cm / kg	10	1						
31	FW	Tatsuya Shiozawa	November 11, 1982 (aged 19)	cm / kg	0	0						
32	MF	Daisuke Tanaka	January 6, 1983 (aged 19)	cm / kg	0	0						
33	MF	Ryosuke Fukazawa	June 29, 1983 (aged 18)	cm / kg	0	0						
34	FW	Igor Cvitanović	November 1, 1970 (aged 31)	cm / kg	5	1						

== Other pages ==
- (in Japanese) J. League official site
