= Tomoyoshi Tsurumi =

Japanese footballer

Tomoyoshi Tsurumi 鶴見 智美
Personal information
- Full name: Tomoyoshi Tsurumi
- Date of birth: October 12, 1979 (age 47)
- Place of birth: Kofu, Japan
- Height: 1.85 m (6 ft 1 in)
- Position: Midfielder

Youth career
- 1995–1997: Nirasaki High School
- 1998–2001: University of Tsukuba

Senior career*
Years	Team	Apps	(Gls)
2002	Ventforet Kofu	41	(8)
2003–2005	Shimizu S-Pulse	45	(2)
2005	Cerezo Osaka	4	(1)
2006–2008	Ventforet Kofu	16	(0)
Total		106	(11)
Medal record
Shimizu S-Pulse
Runner-up	Emperor's Cup	2005
Representing Japan
AFC U-19 Championship
Silver medal – second place	1998 Thailand
- * Club domestic league appearances and goals

Tomoyoshi Tsurumi (鶴見 智美, Tsurumi Tomoyoshi; born October 12, 1979) is a former Japanese football player.

== Early life, family and education ==
Tsurumi was born in Kofu on October 12, 1979. He is a graduate of Nirasaki High School and University of Tsukuba.

== Professional athletic career ==
After college, Tsurumi joined his local club Ventforet Kofu in J2 League in 2002. He became a regular player as defensive midfielder under manager Takeshi Oki in first season. In 2003, he moved to J1 League club Shimizu S-Pulse with manager Oki. He played many matches in 2 seasons. However he lost opportunity to play in 2005. In April 2005, he moved to Cerezo Osaka. However he could not play many matches. In 2006, he moved to his first club, Ventforet Kofu which was promoted to J1 from 2006 season. He played as substitute center forward in 2006. However he could hardly play in the match from 2007 and Ventforet was relegated to J2. He could not play at all in the match in 2008 and retired end of 2008 season.

== Club statistics ==
Club performance			League		Cup		League Cup		Continental		Total	
Season	Club	League	Apps	Goals	Apps	Goals	Apps	Goals	Apps	Goals	Apps	Goals
Japan			League		Emperor's Cup		J.League Cup		Asia		Total	
2002	Ventforet Kofu	J2 League	41	8	3	1	-		-		44	9
2003	Shimizu S-Pulse	J1 League	25	1	2	0	4	0	3	0	34	1
2004	Shimizu S-Pulse	J1 League	20	1	0	0	5	1	-		25	2
2005	Shimizu S-Pulse	J1 League	0	0	0	0	0	0	-		0	0
2005	Cerezo Osaka	J1 League	4	1	1	0	0	0	-		5	1
2006	Ventforet Kofu	J1 League	14	0	0	0	4	1	-		18	1
2007	Ventforet Kofu	J1 League	2	0	0	0	0	0	-		2	0
2008	Ventforet Kofu	J2 League	0	0	0	0	-		-		0	0
Total			106	11	6	1	13	2	3	0	128	14
