= 2004 Shimizu S-Pulse season =

Shimizu S-Pulse
2004 season
- Manager: Antoninho; Nobuhiro Ishizaki
- Stadium: Nihondaira Sports Stadium
- J. League 1: 14th
- Emperor's Cup: 4th Round
- J. League Cup: Quarterfinals
- Top goalscorer: Araújo (9)
Home colours	Away colours

The 2004 S-Pulse season was S-Pulse's thirteenth season in existence and their twelfth season in the J1 League. The club also competed in the Emperor's Cup and the J.League Cup. The team finished the season fourteenth in the league.

== Competitions ==
Competitions	Position
J. League 1	14th / 16 clubs
Emperor's Cup	4th Round
J. League Cup	Quarterfinals

== Domestic results ==
=== J. League 1 ===
Match	Date	Venue	Opponents	Score
1-1	2004.3.13	Hiroshima Big Arch	Sanfrecce Hiroshima	1-1
1-2	2004.3.20	Nihondaira Sports Stadium	Kashima Antlers	1-2
1-3	2004.4.3	Osaka Expo '70 Stadium	Gamba Osaka	4-0
1-4	2004.4.11	Nihondaira Sports Stadium	FC Tokyo	0-0
1-5	2004.4.14	Nihondaira Sports Stadium	Urawa Red Diamonds	4-3
1-6	2004.4.17	Mizuho Athletic Stadium	Nagoya Grampus Eight	2-2
1-7	2004.5.2	Shizuoka Stadium	Júbilo Iwata	1-0
1-9	2004.5.9	Nihondaira Sports Stadium	Cerezo Osaka	1-2
1-8	2004.5.12	International Stadium Yokohama	Yokohama F. Marinos	1-1
1-10	2004.5.16	Kobe Wing Stadium	Vissel Kobe	5-1
1-11	2004.5.22	Nihondaira Sports Stadium	Oita Trinita	1-2
1-12	2004.6.12	Hitachi Kashiwa Soccer Stadium	Kashiwa Reysol	0-0
1-13	2004.6.16	Niigata Stadium	Albirex Niigata	3-3
1-14	2004.6.19	Nihondaira Sports Stadium	Tokyo Verdy 1969	3-1
1-15	2004.6.26	Ichihara Seaside Stadium	JEF United Ichihara	1-1
2-1	2004.8.15	Shizuoka Stadium	Yokohama F. Marinos	1-2
2-2	2004.8.21	Ajinomoto Stadium	FC Tokyo	1-2
2-3	2004.8.29	Nihondaira Sports Stadium	Gamba Osaka	0-1
2-4	2004.9.11	Nihondaira Sports Stadium	Sanfrecce Hiroshima	3-0
2-5	2004.9.18	Oita Stadium	Oita Trinita	1-0
2-6	2004.9.23	Kashima Soccer Stadium	Kashima Antlers	0-0
2-7	2004.9.26	Nihondaira Sports Stadium	Albirex Niigata	2-4
2-8	2004.10.2	Shizuoka Stadium	Júbilo Iwata	1-2
2-9	2004.10.17	Nihondaira Sports Stadium	JEF United Ichihara	1-2
2-10	2004.10.23	National Stadium	Tokyo Verdy 1969	4-0
2-11	2004.10.30	Nihondaira Sports Stadium	Nagoya Grampus Eight	1-2
2-12	2004.11.6	Saitama Stadium 2002	Urawa Red Diamonds	2-1
2-13	2004.11.20	Nihondaira Sports Stadium	Kashiwa Reysol	2-1
2-14	2004.11.23	Nagai Stadium	Cerezo Osaka	2-1
2-15	2004.11.28	Nihondaira Sports Stadium	Vissel Kobe	1-3

=== Emperor's Cup ===
Match	Date	Venue	Opponents	Score
4th Round	2004.11.13	Nihondaira Sports Stadium	Omiya Ardija	0-1

=== J. League Cup ===
Match	Date	Venue	Opponents	Score
GL-C-1	2004.3.27	Ichihara Seaside Stadium	JEF United Ichihara	4-0
GL-C-2	2004.4.29	Nihondaira Sports Stadium	Urawa Red Diamonds	2-0
GL-C-3	2004.5.29	Nihondaira Sports Stadium	JEF United Ichihara	3-2
GL-C-4	2004.6.5	Urawa Komaba Stadium	Urawa Red Diamonds	3-0
GL-C-5	2004.7.17	Nihondaira Sports Stadium	Oita Trinita	1-0
GL-C-6	2004.7.24	Oita Stadium	Oita Trinita	0-2
Quarterfinals	2004.9.4	Ajinomoto Stadium	Tokyo Verdy 1969	2-1

== Player statistics ==
No.	Pos.	Player	D.o.B. (Age)	Height / Weight	J. League 1		Emperor's Cup		J. League Cup		Total	
No.	Pos.	Player	D.o.B. (Age)	Height / Weight	Apps	Goals	Apps	Goals	Apps	Goals	Apps	Goals
1	GK	Masanori Sanada	March 6, 1968 (aged 36)	cm / kg	0	0						
2	DF	Toshihide Saito	April 20, 1973 (aged 30)	cm / kg	26	3						
3	DF	Shohei Ikeda	April 27, 1981 (aged 22)	cm / kg	8	0						
4	MF	Fabinho	October 16, 1976 (aged 27)	cm / kg	3	0						
4	MF	Kazuyuki Toda	December 30, 1977 (aged 26)	cm / kg	12	0						
5	MF	Yasuhiro Yoshida	July 14, 1969 (aged 34)	cm / kg	1	0						
6	DF	Naoki Hiraoka	May 24, 1973 (aged 30)	cm / kg	11	1						
7	MF	Teruyoshi Ito	August 31, 1974 (aged 29)	cm / kg	30	1						
8	FW	Araújo	August 8, 1977 (aged 26)	cm / kg	29	9						
9	FW	Hideaki Kitajima	May 23, 1978 (aged 25)	cm / kg	27	5						
10	MF	Masaaki Sawanobori	January 12, 1970 (aged 34)	cm / kg	24	1						
11	DF	Ryuzo Morioka	October 7, 1975 (aged 28)	cm / kg	29	0						
13	MF	Kohei Hiramatsu	April 19, 1980 (aged 23)	cm / kg	27	2						
14	MF	Jumpei Takaki	September 1, 1982 (aged 21)	cm / kg	18	0						
15	FW	Yoshikiyo Kuboyama	July 21, 1976 (aged 27)	cm / kg	24	4						
16	GK	Yohei Nishibe	December 1, 1980 (aged 23)	cm / kg	27	0						
17	MF	Tomoyoshi Tsurumi	October 12, 1979 (aged 24)	cm / kg	20	1						
18	FW	Paulo Jamelli	July 22, 1974 (aged 29)	cm / kg	3	0						
18	FW	Cho Jae-Jin	July 9, 1981 (aged 22)	cm / kg	12	7						
19	DF	Takumi Wada	October 20, 1981 (aged 22)	cm / kg	11	0						
20	GK	Takaya Kurokawa	April 7, 1981 (aged 22)	cm / kg	4	0						
21	DF	Kazumichi Takagi	November 21, 1980 (aged 23)	cm / kg	2	0						
22	MF	Keisuke Ota	July 23, 1981 (aged 22)	cm / kg	29	1						
23	MF	Yuki Takabayashi	May 22, 1980 (aged 23)	cm / kg	0	0						
24	GK	Tatsuya Tsuruta	September 9, 1982 (aged 21)	cm / kg	0	0						
25	DF	Daisuke Ichikawa	May 14, 1980 (aged 23)	cm / kg	3	0						
26	FW	Bunichiro Abe	April 2, 1985 (aged 18)	cm / kg	3	0						
27	MF	Jun Muramatsu	April 10, 1982 (aged 21)	cm / kg	10	0						
28	MF	Hayato Suzuki	May 13, 1982 (aged 21)	cm / kg	1	0						
29	FW	Takanori Maeda	June 30, 1985 (aged 18)	cm / kg	0	0						
30	GK	Kaito Yamamoto	July 10, 1985 (aged 18)	cm / kg	0	0						
31	MF	Kota Sugiyama	January 24, 1985 (aged 19)	cm / kg	16	2						

== Other pages ==
- (in Japanese) J. League official site
