= Yasuhiro Yoshida =

Japanese footballer and manager

Yasuhiro Yoshida 吉田 康弘
Personal information
- Full name: Yasuhiro Yoshida
- Date of birth: July 14, 1969 (age 57)
- Place of birth: Hiroshima, Japan
- Height: 1.72 m (5 ft 7 1/2 in)
- Position: Midfielder

Youth career
- 1985–1987: Tokai University Daiichi High School
- 1988–1991: Meiji University

Senior career*
Years	Team	Apps	(Gls)
1992–1994	Kashima Antlers	22	(3)
1995	Shimizu S-Pulse	33	(2)
1996–1999	Sanfrecce Hiroshima	107	(5)
2000–2005	Shimizu S-Pulse	77	(2)
2006–2008	FC Gifu	25	(1)
2009	FC Oribe Tajimi		
2009–2010	Fujieda MYFC	15	(1)
Total		279	(14)

Managerial career
- 2013–2017: Tokyo Musashino City FC
- 2026–: Cambodia U19
- 2026–: Bati Academy
Medal record
Kashima Antlers
Runner-up	J1 League	1993
Runner-up	Emperor's Cup	1993
Shimizu S-Pulse
Winner	Emperor's Cup	2001
Runner-up	Emperor's Cup	2000
Runner-up	Emperor's Cup	2005
Sanfrecce Hiroshima
Runner-up	Emperor's Cup	1996
Runner-up	Emperor's Cup	1999
- * Club domestic league appearances and goals

Yasuhiro Yoshida (吉田 康弘, Yoshida Yasuhiro; born July 14, 1969) is a former Japanese football player and manager.

== Playing career ==
Yoshida was born in Hiroshima on July 14, 1969. After graduating from Meiji University, he joined Kashima Antlers in 1992. However he could hardly play in the match. He moved to Shimizu S-Pulse in 1995 and played many matches. He moved to his local club Sanfrecce Hiroshima in 1996 and played as regular player. He left the club end of 1999 season and moved to Brazil. However he could not sign with a club and he returned to Japan. He signed with Shimizu S-Pulse in June 2000. The club won the champions 2001 Emperor's Cup. From 2004, he could hardly play in the match and he moved to Regional Leagues club FC Gifu in 2006. Although he could not play in the match, the club was promoted to Japan Football League in 2007 and J2 League in 2008. From 2009, he played for FC Oribe Tajimi (2009) and Fujieda MYFC (2009-10). He retired end of 2010 season.

== Coaching career ==
After retirement, Yoshida became a coach for Yokogawa Musashino (later Tokyo Musashino City FC) in 2011. He became a manager in 2013. He resigned end of 2017 season.

== Club statistics ==
Club performance			League		Cup		League Cup		Continental		Total	
Season	Club	League	Apps	Goals	Apps	Goals	Apps	Goals	Apps	Goals	Apps	Goals
Japan			League		Emperor's Cup		J.League Cup		Asia		Total	
1992	Kashima Antlers	J1 League	-		3	1	6	1	-		9	2
1993	Kashima Antlers	J1 League	13	2	5	0	1	0	-		19	2
1994	Kashima Antlers	J1 League	9	1	0	0	1	0	-		10	1
1995	Shimizu S-Pulse	J1 League	33	2	0	0	-		-		33	2
1996	Sanfrecce Hiroshima	J1 League	27	1	5	1	10	0	-		42	2
1997	Sanfrecce Hiroshima	J1 League	29	2	0	0	6	0	-		35	2
1998	Sanfrecce Hiroshima	J1 League	32	2	3	1	3	0	-		38	3
1999	Sanfrecce Hiroshima	J1 League	19	0	0	0	4	0	-		23	0
2000	Shimizu S-Pulse	J1 League	13	0	1	0	5	0	-		19	0
2001	Shimizu S-Pulse	J1 League	14	1	5	0	1	0	-		20	1
2002	Shimizu S-Pulse	J1 League	27	1	3	1	7	0	1	0	38	2
2003	Shimizu S-Pulse	J1 League	22	0	0	0	3	0	2	0	27	0
2004	Shimizu S-Pulse	J1 League	1	0	0	0	0	0	-		1	0
2005	Shimizu S-Pulse	J1 League	0	0	0	0	0	0	-		0	0
2006	FC Gifu	Regional Leagues	11	1	3	0	-		-		14	1
2007	FC Gifu	Football League	14	0	2	0	-		-		16	0
2008	FC Gifu	J2 League	0	0	0	0	-		-		0	0
Total			264	13	30	4	47	1	3	0	344	18

== External sources ==
- Yasuhiro Yoshida at J.League (archive) (in Japanese)
