= 2001 Shimizu S-Pulse season =

Shimizu S-Pulse
2001 season
- Manager: Zdravko Zemunović
- Stadium: Nihondaira Sports Stadium
- J.League 1: 4th
- Emperor's Cup: Champions
- J.League Cup: 2nd Round
- Top goalscorer: Baron (15)
Home colours	Away colours

The 2001 season was Shimizu S-Pulse's tenth season in existence and their ninth season in the J1 League. The club also competed in the Emperor's Cup and the J.League Cup. The team finished the season fourth in the league and won the Emperor's Cup.

== Competitions ==
Competitions	Position
J.League 1	4th / 16 clubs
Emperor's Cup	Champions
J.League Cup	2nd round

== Domestic results ==
=== J.League 1 ===
10 March 2001 1-1	Kashiwa Reysol	2-1	Shimizu S-Pulse	Hitachi Kashiwa Soccer Stadium
JST (UTC+09)

17 March 2001 1-2	Shimizu S-Pulse	1-0	Avispa Fukuoka	Nihondaira Sports Stadium
JST (UTC+09)

31 March 2001 1-3	Tokyo Verdy 1969	1-2	Shimizu S-Pulse	Tokyo Stadium
JST (UTC+09)

7 April 2001 1-4	Shimizu S-Pulse	1-0	Vissel Kobe	Nihondaira Sports Stadium
JST (UTC+09)

14 April 2001 1-5	Gamba Osaka	0-1 (GG) (a.e.t.)	Shimizu S-Pulse	Osaka Expo '70 Stadium
JST (UTC+09)

29 April 2001 1-6	Cerezo Osaka	2-1	Shimizu S-Pulse	Osaka Nagai Stadium
JST (UTC+09)

3 May 2001 1-7	Shimizu S-Pulse	5-2	Consadole Sapporo	Nihondaira Sports Stadium
JST (UTC+09)

6 May 2001 1-8	Kashima Antlers	3-4 (GG) (a.e.t.)	Shimizu S-Pulse	Tokyo National Stadium
JST (UTC+09)

12 May 2001 1-9	Shimizu S-Pulse	1-0 (GG) (a.e.t.)	Júbilo Iwata	Shizuoka Stadium
JST (UTC+09)

11 July 2001 1-10	Nagoya Grampus Eight	2-1 (GG) (a.e.t.)	Shimizu S-Pulse	Mizuho Athletic Stadium
JST (UTC+09)

16 June 2001 1-11	Shimizu S-Pulse	1-0 (GG) (a.e.t.)	Urawa Red Diamonds	Nihondaira Sports Stadium
JST (UTC+09)

23 June 2001 1-12	JEF United Ichihara	2-0	Shimizu S-Pulse	Ichihara Seaside Stadium
JST (UTC+09)

7 July 2001 1-13	Shimizu S-Pulse	5-1	Sanfrecce Hiroshima	Nihondaira Sports Stadium
JST (UTC+09)

14 July 2001 1-14	Yokohama F. Marinos	1-3	Shimizu S-Pulse	International Stadium Yokohama
JST (UTC+09)

21 July 2001 1-15	Shimizu S-Pulse	1-2 (GG) (a.e.t.)	FC Tokyo	Nihondaira Sports Stadium
JST (UTC+09)

1 September 2001 2-1	Júbilo Iwata	3-1	Shimizu S-Pulse	Shizuoka Stadium
JST (UTC+09)

18 August 2001 2-2	Shimizu S-Pulse	1-2	Kashima Antlers	Nihondaira Sports Stadium
JST (UTC+09)

25 August 2001 2-3	FC Tokyo	1-2 (GG) (a.e.t.)	Shimizu S-Pulse	Tokyo Stadium
JST (UTC+09)

8 September 2001 2-4	Shimizu S-Pulse	3-0	Yokohama F. Marinos	Nihondaira Sports Stadium
JST (UTC+09)

15 September 2001 2-5	Consadole Sapporo	3-2 (GG) (a.e.t.)	Shimizu S-Pulse	Sapporo Dome
JST (UTC+09)

22 September 2001 2-6	Shimizu S-Pulse	4-1	Cerezo Osaka	Nihondaira Sports Stadium
JST (UTC+09)

29 September 2001 2-7	Shimizu S-Pulse	4-2	Gamba Osaka	Nihondaira Sports Stadium
JST (UTC+09)

13 October 2001 2-8	Vissel Kobe	3-6	Shimizu S-Pulse	Kobe Universiade Memorial Stadium
JST (UTC+09)

17 October 2001 2-9	Shimizu S-Pulse	3-2 (GG) (a.e.t.)	Tokyo Verdy 1969	Kusanagi Athletic Stadium
JST (UTC+09)

20 October 2001 2-10	Shimizu S-Pulse	2-1 (GG) (a.e.t.)	Nagoya Grampus Eight	Nihondaira Sports Stadium
JST (UTC+09)

31 October 2001 2-11	Urawa Red Diamonds	2-1	Shimizu S-Pulse	Urawa Komaba Stadium
JST (UTC+09)

3 November 2001 2-12	Shimizu S-Pulse	1-2	JEF United Ichihara	Nihondaira Sports Stadium
JST (UTC+09)

10 November 2001 2-13	Sanfrecce Hiroshima	3-0	Shimizu S-Pulse	Hiroshima Stadium
JST (UTC+09)

17 November 2001 2-14	Avispa Fukuoka	2-3 (GG) (a.e.t.)	Shimizu S-Pulse	Hakatanomori Football Stadium
JST (UTC+09)

24 November 2001 2-15	Shimizu S-Pulse	1-0	Kashiwa Reysol	Nihondaira Sports Stadium
JST (UTC+09)

=== Emperor's Cup ===
1st Round	bye

2nd Round	bye

9 December 2001 3rd Round	Shimizu S-Pulse	2-0	Honda	Nihondaira Sports Stadium
JST (UTC+09)

16 December 2001 4th Round	Sanfrecce Hiroshima	0-4	Shimizu S-Pulse	Nihondaira Sports Stadium
JST (UTC+09)

24 December 2001 Quarterfinals	Gamba Osaka	0-2	Shimizu S-Pulse	Kagawa Marugame Stadium
JST (UTC+09)

29 December 2001 Semifinals	Kawasaki Frontale	1-2	Shimizu S-Pulse	Kobe Wing Stadium
JST (UTC+09)

1 January 2002 Final	Shimizu S-Pulse	3-2 (GG) (a.e.t.)	Cerezo Osaka	Tokyo National Stadium
JST (UTC+09)

=== J.League Cup ===
1st Round	bye

13 June 2001 2nd Round-1	JEF United Ichihara	1-0	Shimizu S-Pulse	Ichihara Seaside Stadium
JST (UTC+09)

20 June 2001 2nd Round-2	Shimizu S-Pulse	2-1 (GG) (a.e.t.) (4-5 p)	JEF United Ichihara	Kusanagi Athletic Stadium
JST (UTC+09)

== International results ==
=== Asian Cup Winners' Cup ===
Shimizu S-Pulse qualified for this tournament as the defending champions.

Second round

September 2000 1st Leg	Cảng Sài Gòn (Vietnam)	0–2	(Japan) Shimizu S-Pulse	Ho Chi Minh City, Vietnam
		Report		Stadium: Thống Nhất Stadium

September 2000 2nd Leg	Shimizu S-Pulse (Japan)	4–0 (6–0 agg.)	(Vietnam) Cảng Sài Gòn	Shimizu-ku, Japan
		Report		Stadium: Nihondaira Sports Stadium

Quarterfinals

24 March 2001 1st Leg	BEC Tero Sasana (Thailand)	2–2	(Japan) Shimizu S-Pulse	Bangkok, Thailand
		Report		Stadium: Boonyachinda Stadium

4 April 2001 2nd Leg	Shimizu S-Pulse (Japan)	3–1 (5–3 agg.)	(Thailand) BEC Tero Sasana	Shimizu-ku, Japan
		Report		Stadium: Nihondaira Sports Stadium

Final Four

17 May 2001 Semifinals	Dalian Shide (China)	3–2 (a.e.t.)	(Japan) Shimizu S-Pulse	Jeddah, Saudi Arabia
	Orlando 17', 59'; Hao 109'	Report	Ito 18'; Ichikawa 56'	Stadium: Prince Abdullah Al Faisal Stadium

19 May 2001 Third place match	Shimizu S-Pulse (Japan)	3–1	(Iran) Esteghlal	Jeddah, Saudi Arabia
	Koga 19'; Yokoyama 76', 90'	Report	Nikbakht 34'	Stadium: Prince Abdullah Al Faisal Stadium

== Player statistics ==
No.	Pos.	Nat.	Player	D.o.B. (Age)	Height / Weight	J.League 1		Emperor's Cup		J.League Cup		Total	
No.	Pos.	Nat.	Player	D.o.B. (Age)	Height / Weight	Apps	Goals	Apps	Goals	Apps	Goals	Apps	Goals
1	GK	(Japan)	Masanori Sanada	March 6, 1968 (aged 33)	cm / kg	4	0						
2	DF	(Japan)	Toshihide Saito	April 20, 1973 (aged 27)	cm / kg	20	1						
3	DF	(Japan)	Takuma Koga	April 30, 1969 (aged 31)	cm / kg	27	0						
4	MF	(Japan)	Kazuyuki Toda	December 30, 1977 (aged 23)	cm / kg	27	0						
5	FW	(Argentina)	Oliva	September 26, 1971 (aged 29)	cm / kg	0	0						
6	MF	(Japan)	Katsumi Oenoki	April 3, 1965 (aged 35)	cm / kg	11	0						
7	MF	(Japan)	Teruyoshi Ito	August 31, 1974 (aged 26)	cm / kg	27	1						
8	MF	(Japan)	Alessandro Santos	July 20, 1977 (aged 23)	cm / kg	30	12						
9	FW	(Japan)	Sotaro Yasunaga	April 20, 1976 (aged 24)	cm / kg	12	2						
10	MF	(Japan)	Masaaki Sawanobori	January 12, 1970 (aged 31)	cm / kg	26	9						
11	DF	(Japan)	Ryuzo Morioka	October 7, 1975 (aged 25)	cm / kg	30	1						
12	MF	(Japan)	Yasuhiro Yoshida	July 14, 1969 (aged 31)	cm / kg	14	1						
13	MF	(Japan)	Kohei Hiramatsu	April 19, 1980 (aged 20)	cm / kg	30	4						
14	DF	(Japan)	Tsuyoshi Tanikawa	April 25, 1980 (aged 20)	cm / kg	0	0						
15	FW	(Japan)	Yoshikiyo Kuboyama	July 21, 1976 (aged 24)	cm / kg	19	5						
16	GK	(Japan)	Keisuke Hada	February 20, 1978 (aged 23)	cm / kg	18	0						
17	FW	(Japan)	Takayuki Yokoyama	December 22, 1972 (aged 28)	cm / kg	23	8						
18	FW	(Brazil)	Baron	January 19, 1974 (aged 27)	cm / kg	28	15						
19	DF	(Japan)	Shohei Ikeda	April 27, 1981 (aged 19)	cm / kg	0	0						
20	GK	(Japan)	Takaya Kurokawa	April 7, 1981 (aged 19)	cm / kg	8	0						
21	DF	(Japan)	Kazumichi Takagi	November 21, 1980 (aged 20)	cm / kg	5	0						
22	MF	(Japan)	Yusuke Yoshizaki	June 12, 1981 (aged 19)	cm / kg	0	0						
23	FW	(Japan)	Kosuke Suzuki	June 16, 1981 (aged 19)	cm / kg	0	0						
24	GK	(Japan)	Tatsuya Tsuruta	September 9, 1982 (aged 18)	cm / kg	0	0						
25	DF	(Japan)	Daisuke Ichikawa	May 14, 1980 (aged 20)	cm / kg	30	2						
26	FW	(Japan)	Kotaro Yamazaki	October 19, 1978 (aged 22)	cm / kg	9	0						
27	MF	(Japan)	Jun Muramatsu	April 10, 1982 (aged 18)	cm / kg	0	0						
28	MF	(Japan)	Hayato Suzuki	May 13, 1982 (aged 18)	cm / kg	0	0						
29	DF	(Japan)	Kazuki Tsuda	July 26, 1982 (aged 18)	cm / kg	0	0						
30	MF	(Japan)	Jumpei Takaki	September 1, 1982 (aged 18)	cm / kg	0	0						
31	FW	(Japan)	Tatsuya Shiozawa	November 11, 1982 (aged 18)	cm / kg	0	0						
32	MF	(Japan)	Daisuke Tanaka	January 6, 1983 (aged 18)	cm / kg	0	0						
33	DF	(Brazil)	Alair	January 27, 1982 (aged 19)	cm / kg	0	0						
