= 2000 Shimizu S-Pulse season =

Shimizu S-Pulse
2000 season
- Manager: Steve Perryman; Zdravko Zemunović
- Stadium: Nihondaira Sports Stadium
- J. League 1: 8th
- Emperor's Cup: Runners-up
- J. League Cup: Quarterfinals
- Top goalscorer: Santos (4); Alessandro Santos (4)
Home colours	Away colours

The 2000 season was Shimizu S-Pulse's ninth season in existence and their eighth season in the J1 League. The club also competed in the Emperor's Cup and the J.League Cup. The team finished the season eighth in the league.

== Competitions ==
Competitions	Position
J. League 1	8th / 16 clubs
Emperor's Cup	Runners-up
J. League Cup	Quarterfinals

== Domestic results ==
=== J. League 1 ===
11 March 2000 1-1	Shimizu S-Pulse	3-2	Cerezo Osaka	Nihondaira Sports Stadium
JST (UTC+09)

18 March 2000 1-2	Shimizu S-Pulse	1-2	Yokohama F. Marinos	Nihondaira Sports Stadium
JST (UTC+09)

25 March 2000 1-3	Shimizu S-Pulse	2-1 (GG) (a.e.t.)	Kashiwa Reysol	Nihondaira Sports Stadium
JST (UTC+09)

1 April 2000 1-4	Gamba Osaka	0-1	Shimizu S-Pulse	Osaka Expo '70 Stadium
JST (UTC+09)

5 April 2000 1-5	Shimizu S-Pulse	2-1	Kashima Antlers	Nihondaira Sports Stadium
JST (UTC+09)

8 April 2000 1-6	Nagoya Grampus Eight	1-0	Shimizu S-Pulse	Mizuho Athletic Stadium
JST (UTC+09)

24 May 2000 1-7	Shimizu S-Pulse	1-0	Sanfrecce Hiroshima	Nihondaira Sports Stadium
JST (UTC+09)

22 April 2000 1-8	Kyoto Purple Sanga	1-2 (GG) (a.e.t.)	Shimizu S-Pulse	Nishikyogoku Athletic Stadium
JST (UTC+09)

29 April 2000 1-9	Kawasaki Frontale	0-2	Shimizu S-Pulse	Todoroki Athletics Stadium
JST (UTC+09)

3 May 2000 1-10	Shimizu S-Pulse	2-1	F.C. Tokyo	Nihondaira Sports Stadium
JST (UTC+09)

6 May 2000 1-11	Avispa Fukuoka	3-0	Shimizu S-Pulse	Hakatanomori Football Stadium
JST (UTC+09)

13 May 2000 1-12	Shimizu S-Pulse	1-0	JEF United Ichihara	Nihondaira Sports Stadium
JST (UTC+09)

17 May 2000 1-13	Vissel Kobe	2-0	Shimizu S-Pulse	Kobe Universiade Memorial Stadium
JST (UTC+09)

20 May 2000 1-14	Shimizu S-Pulse	2-3 (GG) (a.e.t.)	Verdy Kawasaki	Nihondaira Sports Stadium
JST (UTC+09)

27 May 2000 1-15	Júbilo Iwata	0-2	Shimizu S-Pulse	Júbilo Iwata Stadium
JST (UTC+09)

24 June 2000 2-1	Cerezo Osaka	3-1	Shimizu S-Pulse	Osaka Nagai Stadium
JST (UTC+09)

1 July 2000 2-2	Yokohama F. Marinos	0-1	Shimizu S-Pulse	Tokyo National Stadium
JST (UTC+09)

8 July 2000 2-3	Shimizu S-Pulse	0-1	Avispa Fukuoka	Nihondaira Sports Stadium
JST (UTC+09)

15 July 2000 2-4	F.C. Tokyo	2-0	Shimizu S-Pulse	Kagawa Marugame Stadium
JST (UTC+09)

22 July 2000 2-5	Shimizu S-Pulse	2-2 (GG) (a.e.t.)	Kawasaki Frontale	Nihondaira Sports Stadium
JST (UTC+09)

26 July 2000 2-6	Shimizu S-Pulse	1-1 (GG) (a.e.t.)	Kyoto Purple Sanga	Kusanagi Athletic Stadium
JST (UTC+09)

29 July 2000 2-7	Sanfrecce Hiroshima	1-0	Shimizu S-Pulse	Hiroshima Big Arch
JST (UTC+09)

5 August 2000 2-8	Shimizu S-Pulse	2-1 (GG) (a.e.t.)	Gamba Osaka	Nihondaira Sports Stadium
JST (UTC+09)

12 August 2000 2-9	Kashiwa Reysol	1-0	Shimizu S-Pulse	Kashiwanoha Park Stadium
JST (UTC+09)

19 August 2000 2-10	Shimizu S-Pulse	1-2	Nagoya Grampus Eight	Nihondaira Sports Stadium
JST (UTC+09)

8 November 2000 2-11	Kashima Antlers	2-1	Shimizu S-Pulse	Tokyo National Stadium
JST (UTC+09)

11 November 2000 2-12	Shimizu S-Pulse	1-0 (GG) (a.e.t.)	Júbilo Iwata	Nihondaira Sports Stadium
JST (UTC+09)

18 November 2000 2-13	Verdy Kawasaki	2-0	Shimizu S-Pulse	Suizenji Stadium
JST (UTC+09)

23 November 2000 2-14	Shimizu S-Pulse	1-0	Vissel Kobe	Nihondaira Sports Stadium
JST (UTC+09)

26 November 2000 2-15	JEF United Ichihara	1-2 (GG) (a.e.t.)	Shimizu S-Pulse	Ichihara Seaside Stadium
JST (UTC+09)

=== Emperor's Cup ===
1st Round	bye

2nd Round	bye

6 December 2000 3rd Round	Shimizu S-Pulse	3-0	Denso	Nihondaira Sports Stadium
JST (UTC+09)

17 December 2000 4th Round	Shimizu S-Pulse	1-0	Avispa Fukuoka	Nihondaira Sports Stadium
JST (UTC+09)

23 December 2000 Quarterfinals	Shimizu S-Pulse	3-1	JEF United Ichihara	Kagawa Marugame Stadium
JST (UTC+09)

29 December 2000 Semifinals	Shimizu S-Pulse	1-0	Vissel Kobe	Osaka Nagai Stadium
JST (UTC+09)

1 January 2001 Final	Kashima Antlers	3-2 (GG) (a.e.t.)	Shimizu S-Pulse	Tokyo National Stadium
JST (UTC+09)

=== J. League Cup ===
7 June 2000 1st Round-1	Shimizu S-Pulse	4-1	Mito HollyHock	Kusanagi Athletic Stadium
JST (UTC+09)

14 June 2000 1st Round-2	Mito HollyHock	1-3 (2-7 agg.)	Shimizu S-Pulse	Tochigi Green Stadium
JST (UTC+09)

5 July 2000 2nd Round-1	Vissel Kobe	2-0	Shimizu S-Pulse	Kobe Universiade Memorial Stadium
JST (UTC+09)

12 July 2000 2nd Round-2	Shimizu S-Pulse	4-0 (4-2 agg.)	Vissel Kobe	Kusanagi Athletic Stadium
JST (UTC+09)

30 August 2000 Quarterfinals-1	Shimizu S-Pulse	4-6	Nagoya Grampus Eight	Kusanagi Athletic Stadium
JST (UTC+09)

6 September 2000 Quarterfinals-2	Nagoya Grampus Eight	0-0 (6-4 agg.)	Shimizu S-Pulse	Mizuho Athletic Stadium
JST (UTC+09)

== Player statistics ==
No.	Pos.	Nat.	Player	D.o.B. (Age)	Height / Weight	J. League 1		Emperor's Cup		J. League Cup		Total	
No.	Pos.	Nat.	Player	D.o.B. (Age)	Height / Weight	Apps	Goals	Apps	Goals	Apps	Goals	Apps	Goals
1	GK	(Japan)	Masanori Sanada	March 6, 1968 (aged 32)	cm / kg	29	0						
2	DF	(Japan)	Toshihide Saito	April 20, 1973 (aged 26)	cm / kg	28	3						
3	DF	(Japan)	Takuma Koga	April 30, 1969 (aged 30)	cm / kg	9	0						
4	MF	(Japan)	Kazuyuki Toda	December 30, 1977 (aged 22)	cm / kg	27	1						
5	MF	(Brazil)	Santos	December 9, 1960 (aged 39)	cm / kg	27	4						
6	MF	(Japan)	Katsumi Oenoki	April 3, 1965 (aged 34)	cm / kg	27	2						
7	MF	(Japan)	Teruyoshi Ito	August 31, 1974 (aged 25)	cm / kg	24	1						
8	MF	(Brazil)	Alessandro Santos	July 20, 1977 (aged 22)	cm / kg	30	4						
9	FW	(Japan)	Sotaro Yasunaga	April 20, 1976 (aged 23)	cm / kg	24	3						
10	MF	(Japan)	Masaaki Sawanobori	January 12, 1970 (aged 30)	cm / kg	27	3						
11	DF	(Japan)	Ryuzo Morioka	October 7, 1975 (aged 24)	cm / kg	27	0						
12	FW	(Brazil)	Fabinho	June 16, 1974 (aged 25)	cm / kg	17	2						
12	FW	(Argentina)	Oliva	September 26, 1971 (aged 28)	cm / kg	5	1						
13	MF	(Japan)	Kohei Hiramatsu	April 19, 1980 (aged 19)	cm / kg	20	2						
14	DF	(Japan)	Tsuyoshi Tanikawa	April 25, 1980 (aged 19)	cm / kg	1	1						
15	FW	(Japan)	Yoshikiyo Kuboyama	July 21, 1976 (aged 23)	cm / kg	29	3						
16	GK	(Japan)	Nobuhiro Maeda	June 3, 1973 (aged 26)	cm / kg	0	0						
17	FW	(Japan)	Takayuki Yokoyama	December 22, 1972 (aged 27)	cm / kg	5	0						
18	FW	(Japan)	Hitoshi Matsushima	April 30, 1980 (aged 19)	cm / kg	4	0						
19	DF	(Japan)	Shohei Ikeda	April 27, 1981 (aged 18)	cm / kg	1	0						
20	GK	(Japan)	Keisuke Hada	February 20, 1978 (aged 22)	cm / kg	0	0						
21	MF	(Japan)	Keisuke Ota	July 23, 1981 (aged 18)	cm / kg	0	0						
22	MF	(Japan)	Yusuke Yoshizaki	June 12, 1981 (aged 18)	cm / kg	0	0						
23	FW	(Japan)	Kosuke Suzuki	June 16, 1981 (aged 18)	cm / kg	0	0						
24	GK	(Japan)	Takaya Kurokawa	April 7, 1981 (aged 18)	cm / kg	1	0						
25	DF	(Japan)	Daisuke Ichikawa	May 14, 1980 (aged 19)	cm / kg	26	2						
26	MF	(Japan)	Taijiro Kurita	March 3, 1975 (aged 25)	cm / kg	0	0						
27	DF	(Japan)	Masahiro Endo	August 15, 1970 (aged 29)	cm / kg	7	0						
27	MF	(England)	Stuart Thurgood	November 4, 1981 (aged 18)	cm / kg	0	0						
28	MF	(Japan)	Yasuhiro Yoshida	July 14, 1969 (aged 30)	cm / kg	13	0						
29	DF	(Japan)	Kazumichi Takagi	November 21, 1980 (aged 19)	cm / kg	0	0						
