= Shohei Ikeda =

Japanese footballer (born 1981)

Shohei Ikeda 池田 昇平
Personal information
- Full name: Shohei Ikeda
- Date of birth: April 27, 1981 (age 45)
- Place of birth: Shizuoka, Japan
- Height: 1.80 m (5 ft 11 in)
- Position: Defender

Youth career
- 1994–1999: Shimizu S-Pulse

Senior career*
Years	Team	Apps	(Gls)
2000–2004	Shimizu S-Pulse	64	(2)
2005	Sanfrecce Hiroshima	10	(0)
2006	Vegalta Sendai	22	(0)
2007–2010	JEF United Chiba	59	(0)
2011	Ehime FC	34	(1)
2012	FC Gifu	10	(0)
Total		199	(3)

International career
2001	Japan U-20	3	(0)
Medal record
Shimizu S-Pulse
Winner	Emperor's Cup	2001
Runner-up	Emperor's Cup	2000
Representing Japan
Asian Games
Silver medal – second place	2002 Busan	Team
AFC U-19 Championship
Silver medal – second place	2000 Iran
- * Club domestic league appearances and goals

Shohei Ikeda (池田 昇平, Ikeda Shohei; born April 27, 1981) is a former Japanese football player.

== Club career ==
Ikeda was born in Shizuoka on April 27, 1981. He joined the Shimizu S-Pulse first-team in 2000. At the 1999–2000 Asian Cup Winners' Cup, he scored a winning goal at the final and the club won the championship. Although he became a regular player in 2002, his did not play as much in 2004 and he moved to Sanfrecce Hiroshima in 2005. He moved to Vegalta Sendai in 2006 and JEF United Chiba in 2007. At JEF United, he played for four seasons. After that, he played for Ehime FC (2011) and FC Gifu (2012). He retired at the end of the 2012 season.

== National team career ==
In June 2001, Ikeda was selected for the Japan U-20 national team for the 2001 World Youth Championship. At that tournament, he played all three matches.

== Club statistics ==
Club performance			League		Cup		League Cup		Continental		Total	
Season	Club	League	Apps	Goals	Apps	Goals	Apps	Goals	Apps	Goals	Apps	Goals
Japan			League		Emperor's Cup		J.League Cup		Asia		Total	
2000	Shimizu S-Pulse	J1 League	1	0	0	0	2	0	-		3	0
2001	Shimizu S-Pulse	J1 League	0	0	0	0	0	0	-		0	0
2002	Shimizu S-Pulse	J1 League	27	0	3	0	7	0	2	1	39	1
2003	Shimizu S-Pulse	J1 League	28	2	4	0	3	0	2	0	37	2
2004	Shimizu S-Pulse	J1 League	8	0	1	0	2	0	-		11	0
2005	Sanfrecce Hiroshima	J1 League	10	0	0	0	2	0	-		12	0
2006	Vegalta Sendai	J2 League	22	0	1	0	-		-		23	0
2007	JEF United Chiba	J1 League	13	0	0	0	2	0	-		15	0
2008	JEF United Chiba	J1 League	27	0	5	0	2	0	-		34	0
2009	JEF United Chiba	J1 League	19	0	0	0	5	0	-		24	0
2010	JEF United Chiba	J2 League	0	0	1	0	-		-		1	0
2011	Ehime FC	J2 League	34	1	2	1	-		-		36	2
2012	FC Gifu	J2 League	10	0	1	0	-		-		11	0
Total			199	3	14	1	28	0	4	1	241	4
