= 2003 Shimizu S-Pulse season =

Shimizu S-Pulse
2003 season
- Manager: Takeshi Oki; Koji Gyotoku
- Stadium: Nihondaira Sports Stadium
- J.League 1: 11th
- Emperor's Cup: Semifinals
- J.League Cup: Semifinals
- AFC Champions League: Group stage
- Top goalscorer: Ahn Jung-Hwan (11)
Home colours	Away colours

The 2003 S-Pulse season was S-Pulse's twelfth season in existence and their eleventh season in the J1 League. The club also competed in the Emperor's Cup and the J.League Cup. The team finished the season eleventh in the league.

== Competitions ==
Competitions	Position
J.League 1	11th / 16 clubs
Emperor's Cup	Semifinals
J.League Cup	Semifinals

== Domestic results ==
=== J.League 1 ===
Match	Date	Venue	Opponents	Score
1-1	2003.3.22	Mizuho Athletic Stadium	Nagoya Grampus Eight	2-2
1-2	2003.4.5	Kusanagi (ja:Shizuoka Stadium県草薙総合運動場陸上競技場)	Cerezo Osaka	4-5
1-3	2003.4.13	Sendai Stadium	Vegalta Sendai	1-3
1-4	2003.4.19	Shizuoka Stadium	Júbilo Iwata	0-2
1-5	2003.4.26	Nishikyogoku Athletic Stadium	Kyoto Purple Sanga	3-0
1-6	2003.4.29	Shizuoka Stadium	Kashiwa Reysol	0-2
1-7	2003.5.5	Saitama Stadium 2002	Urawa Red Diamonds	0-1
1-8	2003.5.10	Ajinomoto Stadium	Tokyo Verdy 1969	2-1
1-9	2003.5.18	Kusanagi (ja:Shizuoka Stadium県草薙総合運動場陸上競技場)	Vissel Kobe	3-0
1-10	2003.5.25	Osaka Expo '70 Stadium	Gamba Osaka	0-1
1-11	2003.7.5	National Olympic Stadium (Tokyo)	Yokohama F. Marinos	0-1
1-12	2003.7.12	Kusanagi (ja:Shizuoka Stadium県草薙総合運動場陸上競技場)	Kashima Antlers	2-0
1-13	2003.7.19	Ajinomoto Stadium	FC Tokyo	0-0
1-14	2003.7.26	Nihondaira Sports Stadium	JEF United Ichihara	3-0
1-15	2003.8.2	Ōita Stadium	Oita Trinita	0-0
2-1	2003.8.16	Nihondaira Sports Stadium	Vegalta Sendai	2-2
2-2	2003.8.23	Shizuoka Stadium	Júbilo Iwata	0-1
2-3	2003.8.30	Nihondaira Sports Stadium	Tokyo Verdy 1969	3-1
2-4	2003.9.6	Kobe Wing Stadium	Vissel Kobe	2-1
2-5	2003.9.14	Kusanagi (ja:Shizuoka Stadium県草薙総合運動場陸上競技場)	Gamba Osaka	1-1
2-6	2003.9.20	International Stadium Yokohama	Yokohama F. Marinos	1-5
2-7	2003.9.23	Nihondaira Sports Stadium	Oita Trinita	0-0
2-8	2003.9.27	Ichihara Seaside Stadium	JEF United Ichihara	1-2
2-9	2003.10.5	Nihondaira Sports Stadium	Kyoto Purple Sanga	1-0
2-10	2003.10.18	Kashima Soccer Stadium	Kashima Antlers	0-2
2-11	2003.10.25	Nihondaira Sports Stadium	FC Tokyo	1-3
2-12	2003.11.8	Hitachi Kashiwa Soccer Stadium	Kashiwa Reysol	3-2
2-13	2003.11.15	Nihondaira Sports Stadium	Urawa Red Diamonds	1-0
2-14	2003.11.24	Nagai Stadium	Cerezo Osaka	1-5
2-15	2003.11.29	Nihondaira Sports Stadium	Nagoya Grampus Eight	2-1

=== Emperor's Cup ===
Match	Date	Venue	Opponents	Score
3rd round	2003..			-
4th round	2003..			-
Quarterfinals	2003..			-
Semifinals	2003..			-

=== J.League Cup ===
Match	Date	Venue	Opponents	Score
Quarterfinals-1	2003..			-
Quarterfinals-2	2003..			-
Semifinals-1	2003..			-
Semifinals-2	2003..			-
Final	2003..			-

== International results ==
=== AFC Champions League ===
Shimizu S-Pulse qualified for the group stage after getting through the qualifying rounds in late 2002.

Group stage

Team	Pld	W	D	L	GF	GA	GD	Pts
(China) Dalian Shide (H)	3	2	1	0	10	2	+8	7
(South Korea) Seongnam Ilhwa Chunma	3	2	0	1	9	4	+5	6
(Japan) Shimizu S-Pulse	3	1	1	1	8	2	+6	4
(Thailand) Osotsapa FC	3	0	0	3	1	20	−19	0

(H) Hosts

9 March 2003 1	Shimizu S-Pulse (Japan)	0–0	(China) Dalian Shide	Dalian, China
		Report		Stadium: People's Stadium; Attendance: 30,000; Referee: Kim Jong-sik (South Korea)

12 March 2003 2	Shimizu S-Pulse (Japan)	1–2	(South Korea) Seongnam Ilhwa Chunma	Dalian, China
	Ahn Jung-hwan 53'	Report	Drakulić 74'; Kim Dae-eui 87'	Stadium: People's Stadium; Attendance: 2,000; Referee: Ahmad Khalidi Supain (Malaysia)

15 March 2003 3	Osotsapa FC (Thailand)	0–7	(Japan) Shimizu S-Pulse	Dalian, China
		Report	Takagi 23', 40'; Sawanobori 27'; Alex 50'; Ahn Jung-hwan 60', 71'; Kitajima 75'	Stadium: People's Stadium; Attendance: 5,000; Referee: Setiyono Midi Nitrerejo (Indonesia)

== Player statistics ==
No.	Pos.	Player	D.o.B. (Age)	Height / Weight	J.League 1		Emperor's Cup		J.League Cup		Total	
No.	Pos.	Player	D.o.B. (Age)	Height / Weight	Apps	Goals	Apps	Goals	Apps	Goals	Apps	Goals
1	GK	Masanori Sanada	March 6, 1968 (aged 35)	cm / kg	4	0						
2	DF	Toshihide Saito	April 20, 1973 (aged 29)	cm / kg	2	0						
3	DF	Shohei Ikeda	April 27, 1981 (aged 21)	cm / kg	28	2						
4	DF	Naoki Hiraoka	May 24, 1973 (aged 29)	cm / kg	8	0						
5	MF	Yasuhiro Yoshida	July 14, 1969 (aged 33)	cm / kg	22	0						
6	DF	Émerson	January 5, 1975 (aged 28)	cm / kg	15	1						
7	MF	Teruyoshi Ito	August 31, 1974 (aged 28)	cm / kg	30	2						
8	MF	Alessandro Santos	July 20, 1977 (aged 25)	cm / kg	26	7						
9	FW	Tuto	July 2, 1978 (aged 24)	cm / kg	20	6						
10	MF	Masaaki Sawanobori	January 12, 1970 (aged 33)	cm / kg	14	2						
11	DF	Ryuzo Morioka	October 7, 1975 (aged 27)	cm / kg	25	3						
13	MF	Kohei Hiramatsu	April 19, 1980 (aged 22)	cm / kg	14	1						
14	MF	Jumpei Takaki	September 1, 1982 (aged 20)	cm / kg	9	0						
15	FW	Yoshikiyo Kuboyama	July 21, 1976 (aged 26)	cm / kg	23	1						
16	GK	Keisuke Hada	February 20, 1978 (aged 25)	cm / kg	2	0						
17	MF	Tomoyoshi Tsurumi	October 12, 1979 (aged 23)	cm / kg	25	1						
18	FW	Hideaki Kitajima	May 23, 1978 (aged 24)	cm / kg	18	2						
19	FW	Ahn Jung-Hwan	January 27, 1976 (aged 27)	cm / kg	28	11						
20	GK	Takaya Kurokawa	April 7, 1981 (aged 21)	cm / kg	24	0						
21	DF	Kazumichi Takagi	November 21, 1980 (aged 22)	cm / kg	16	0						
22	MF	Keisuke Ota	July 23, 1981 (aged 21)	cm / kg	8	0						
23	MF	Yuki Takabayashi	May 22, 1980 (aged 22)	cm / kg	0	0						
25	DF	Daisuke Ichikawa	May 14, 1980 (aged 22)	cm / kg	23	0						
26	FW	Tatsuya Shiozawa	November 11, 1982 (aged 20)	cm / kg	0	0						
27	MF	Jun Muramatsu	April 10, 1982 (aged 20)	cm / kg	6	0						
28	MF	Hayato Suzuki	May 13, 1982 (aged 20)	cm / kg	4	0						
29	DF	Kazuki Tsuda	July 26, 1982 (aged 20)	cm / kg	0	0						
30	MF	Daisuke Tanaka	January 6, 1983 (aged 20)	cm / kg	0	0						
31	MF	Kota Sugiyama	January 24, 1985 (aged 18)	cm / kg	5	0						

== Other pages ==
- (in Japanese) J. League official site
