= Ryuzo Morioka =

Japanese footballer

Ryuzo Morioka 森岡 隆三
Personal information
- Date of birth: 7 October 1975 (age 51)
- Place of birth: Yokohama, Japan
- Height: 1.80 m (5 ft 11 in)
- Position: Defender

Youth career
- 1991–1993: Toin Gakuen High School

Senior career*
Years	Team	Apps	(Gls)
1994–1995	Kashima Antlers	1	(0)
1995–2006	Shimizu S-Pulse	277	(9)
2007–2008	Kyoto Sanga FC	29	(1)
Total		307	(10)

International career
2000	Japan Olympic (O.P.)	3	(0)
1999–2003	Japan	38	(0)

Managerial career
- 2017–2018: Gainare Tottori
Medal record
Men's football
Representing Japan
AFC Asian Cup
Winner	2000 Lebanon
FIFA Confederations Cup
Runner-up	2001 Korea/Japan
- * Club domestic league appearances and goals

Ryuzo Morioka (森岡 隆三, Morioka Ryūzō; born 7 October 1975) is a Japanese former professional footballer who played as a defender. He played for Japan national team.

== Club career ==
Morioka was born in Yokohama on 7 October 1975. After graduating from high school, he joined Kashima Antlers in 1994. He moved to Shimizu S-Pulse in August 1995. He played many matches as center back. The club won 1996 J.League Cup and 2001 J1 League. In Asia, the club won the champions 1999–2000 Asian Cup Winners' Cup and te 3rd place 2000–01 Asian Cup Winners' Cup. However his opportunity to play decreased from 2005. He moved to J2 League club Kyoto Sanga FC in 2007. He played as captain and the club was promoted to J1 League in 2007. He retired end of 2008 season.

== International career ==
In April 1995, Morioka was selected Japan U-20 national team for 1995 World Youth Championship, but he did not play in the match.

On 31 March 1999, Morioka debuted for Japan national team against Brazil. After the debut, he became a regular player and played all matches including 1999 Copa America in 1999. He mainly played as central defender in three back as Masami Ihara successor. He also served as captain in many matches. In September 2000, he was elected Japan U-23 national team as over age for 2000 Summer Olympics. He played 3 games as captain. In October, he played at 2000 Asian Cup. He played full-time in all 6 matches and Japan won the champions. He also played at 2001 Confederations Cup and Japan won the 2nd place. In 2002, he could not play for injury. He was elected Japan for 2002 World Cup. He played as captain in first match against Belgium, but he was injured and replaced. After 2002 World Cup, in March 2003, he was elected Japan again by new manager Zico. On 8 June 2003, the match against Argentina is his last game for Japan. Although he was a member of Japan for 2003 Confederations Cup in June, he did not play in the match. He played 38 games for Japan until 2003.

== Coaching career ==
After retirement, Morioka started coaching career at Kyoto Sanga FC in 2009. He served as coach for top team and manager for youth team until 2016 excluding 2014 he moved to Sagawa Printing Kyoto and served as coach. In 2017, he moved to J3 League club Gainare Tottori and became a manager. However Gainare results were bad and finished at the bottom place of 17 clubs. He was sacked in June 2018 when the club was at the 7th place.

== Career statistics ==
=== Club ===
Appearances and goals by club, season and competition
Club	Season	League			Emperor's Cup		J.League Cup		Asia		Total	
Club	Season	Division	Apps	Goals	Apps	Goals	Apps	Goals	Apps	Goals	Apps	Goals
Kashima Antlers	1994	J1 League	1	0	0	0	0	0	–		1	0
Kashima Antlers	1995	J1 League	0	0	0	0	–		–		0	0
Shimizu S-Pulse	1995	J1 League	25	1	0	0	–		–		25	1
Shimizu S-Pulse	1996	J1 League	23	0	3	0	16	1	–		42	1
Shimizu S-Pulse	1997	J1 League	30	1	3	0	6	0	–		39	1
Shimizu S-Pulse	1998	J1 League	26	0	5	0	3	0	–		34	0
Shimizu S-Pulse	1999	J1 League	26	1	0	0	4	0	–		30	1
Shimizu S-Pulse	2000	J1 League	27	0	5	0	2	0	–		34	0
Shimizu S-Pulse	2001	J1 League	30	1	5	2	1	0	–		36	3
Shimizu S-Pulse	2002	J1 League	3	1	1	0	2	0	–		6	1
Shimizu S-Pulse	2003	J1 League	25	3	4	1	4	1	3	0	36	5
Shimizu S-Pulse	2004	J1 League	29	0	1	0	6	1	–		36	1
Shimizu S-Pulse	2005	J1 League	23	1	5	0	6	0	–		34	1
Shimizu S-Pulse	2006	J1 League	10	0	0	0	1	0	–		11	0
Kyoto Sanga FC	2007	J2 League	22	1	0	0	–		–		22	1
Kyoto Sanga FC	2008	J1 League	7	0	0	0	3	0	–		10	0
Career total			307	10	32	3	54	3	3	0	396	16

=== International ===
Appearances and goals by national team and year
National team	Year	Apps	Goals
Japan	1999	7	0
Japan	2000	14	0
Japan	2001	11	0
Japan	2002	2	0
Japan	2003	4	0
Total		38	0

== Managerial statistics ==
Team	From	To	Record				
Team	From	To	G	W	D	L	Win %
Gainare Tottori	2017	2018	44	9	12	23	20.45
Total			44	9	12	23	20.45

== Honours ==
Japan

- AFC Asian Cup: 2000
- FIFA Confederations Cup runner-up: 2001

Shimizu S-Pulse

- Emperor's Cup: 2001
- J.League Cup: 1996
- Japanese Super Cup: 2001, 2002
- Asian Cup Winner's Cup: 2000

Individual

- J1 League Best Eleven: 1999
- AFC Asian Cup Best Defender: 2000
- AFC All Star Team: 2000
