= Takanori Maeda =

Japanese footballer

Takanori Maeda 前田 高孝
Personal information
- Full name: Takanori Maeda
- Date of birth: June 30, 1985 (age 41)
- Place of birth: Higashiazai District, Shiga, Japan
- Height: 1.78 m (5 ft 10 in)
- Position: Forward

Youth career
- –1997: Torahime Elementary School
- 1998–2000: Ohmi Brotherhood Junior High School
- 2001–2003: Kusatsu Higashi High School

Senior career*
Years	Team	Apps	(Gls)
2004–2005	Shimizu S-Pulse	0	(0)
2006	Albirex Niigata Singapore	11	(5)
2007	MIO Biwako Kusatsu	0	(0)
2007–2008	FSV Dörnberg	?	(?)
Total		11+	(5+)

Managerial career
- 2012–2015: Kwansei Gakuin University
- 2016–: Ohmi High School
Medal record
Shimizu S-Pulse
Runner-up	Emperor's Cup	2005
- * Club domestic league appearances and goals

Takanori Maeda (前田 高孝, Maeda Takanori; born June 30, 1985) is a former Japanese football player, and currently manager of Ohmi High School football team.

== Playing career ==
Maeda was born in Higashiazai District, Shiga on June 30, 1985. After graduating from high school, he joined J1 League club Shimizu S-Pulse in 2004. In 2006, he moved to S.League club Albirex Niigata Singapore. In 2007, he backed to Japan and joined MIO Biwako Kusatsu.
