= 2001 Japanese Super Cup =

| Kashima Antlers | Shimizu S-Pulse |
| 0 | 3 |
- Date: March 3, 2001
- Venue: National Stadium, Tokyo
- Attendance: 25,095

2001 Japanese Super Cup was the Japanese Super Cup competition. The match was played at National Stadium in Tokyo on March 3, 2001. Shimizu S-Pulse won the championship.

== Match details ==
March 3, 2001

| Kashima Antlers | 0–3 | Shimizu S-Pulse |

National Stadium
Attendance: 25,095
