= 1999–2000 Asian Cup Winners' Cup =

Tournament details
- Teams: 22

Final positions
- Champions: (Japan) Shimizu S-Pulse (1st title)
- Runners-up: (Iraq) Al-Zawraa
- Third place: (Thailand) Bangkok Bank
- Fourth place: (Uzbekistan) Navbahor Namangan

The 1999–2000 Asian Cup Winners' Cup was the tenth edition of association football competition run by the Asian Football Confederation specifically for its members cup holders.

== First round ==
=== West Asia ===
Team 1	Agg.	Team 2	1st leg	2nd leg
Esteghlal (Iran)	15–0	(Lebanon) Homenmen	7–0	8–0
Al Arabi (Kuwait)	(w/o)^{1}	(Iraq) Al-Zawraa		
Al Ittihad (Yemen)	1–4	(Qatar) Al Rayyan	0–2	1–2
Al Jaish (Syria)	2–2 (a)	(United Arab Emirates) Al Ain	0–1	2–1
Kaisar Hurricane (Kazakhstan)	3–3 (4–3 p)	(Tajikistan) Khujand	3–0	0–3
Al Ahli (Saudi Arabia)	bye			
Al Ittihad (Saudi Arabia)	bye			
Navbahor Namangan (Uzbekistan)	bye			

^{1} Al Arabi withdrew

=== East Asia ===
Team 1	Agg.	Team 2	1st leg	2nd leg
New Radiant (Maldives)	1–4	(Vietnam) Công An Thành Phố Hồ Chí Minh	1–3	0–1

== Second round ==
=== West Asia ===
Team 1	Agg.	Team 2	1st leg	2nd leg
Al Ittihad (Saudi Arabia)	2–1	(Iran) Esteghlal	1–0	1–1
Al-Zawraa (Iraq)	5–4	(Qatar) Al Rayyan	5–2	0–2
Al Ahli (Saudi Arabia)	3–0	(Syria) Al-Jaish	1–0	2–0
Kaisar Hurricane (Kazakhstan)	2–3	(Uzbekistan) Navbahor Namangan	2–2	0–1

=== East Asia ===
Team 1	Agg.	Team 2	1st leg	2nd leg
Shanghai Shenhua (China)	0–2	(Japan) Shimizu S-Pulse	0–0	0–2
Sembawang Rangers (Singapore)	(w/o)^{1}	(South Korea) Anyang LG Cheetahs		
Công An Thành Phố Hồ Chí Minh (Vietnam)	1–4	(Hong Kong) South China	1–1	0–3
Bangkok Bank (Thailand)	6–0	(Indonesia) Persebaya Surabaya	5–0	1–0

^{1} Sembawang Rangers withdrew before 1st leg

== Quarterfinals ==
=== West Asia ===
Team 1	Agg.	Team 2	1st leg	2nd leg
Al Ittihad (Saudi Arabia)	1–2	(Iraq) Al-Zawraa	1–2	0–0
Al Ahli (Saudi Arabia)	6–3^{1}	(Uzbekistan) Navbahor Namangan	6–1	0–2

^{1} Al Ahli withdrew for the semifinals, and were replaced by Navbahor Namangan; Al Ahli were banned for one year from Asian club competitions.

=== East Asia ===
Team 1	Agg.	Team 2	1st leg	2nd leg
Shimizu S-Pulse (Japan)	5–2	(South Korea) Anyang LG Cheetahs	3–1	2–1
South China (Hong Kong)	3–5	(Thailand) Bangkok Bank	3–2	0–3

== Semifinals ==
13 April 2000

Shimizu S-Pulse (Japan)	0–0 (a.e.t.)	(Thailand) Bangkok Bank
Penalties
	4–2

Chiang Mai, Thailand
13 April 2000

Al-Zawraa (Iraq)	2–1	(Uzbekistan) Navbahor Namangan
Ahmed Sabie 45'; Mohammed 102'		Sherzod Nazarov 36'

Chiang Mai, Thailand

== Third place match ==
15 April 2000

Bangkok Bank (Thailand)	3–1	(Uzbekistan) Navbahor Namangan
Apichart Thaweechalermdit 4' (pen.); Apiruck Sriaroon 36'; Nawee Hatihakreangkrai 38'

Chiang Mai, Thailand

== Final ==
15 April 2000

Shimizu S-Pulse (Japan)	1–0	(Iraq) Al-Zawraa
Shohei Ikeda 74'

Chiang Mai, Thailand
