= 2005 Emperor's Cup =

Tournament details
- Country: Japan
- Teams: 80

Final positions
- Champions: Urawa Red Diamonds (5th title)
- Runners-up: Shimizu S-Pulse

Tournament statistics
- Matches played: 79

The 85th Emperor's Cup was held between September 17, 2005 and January 1, 2006. The tournament was won by Urawa Red Diamonds. The J.League Division 2 clubs qualified automatically to the third round, while the J.League Division 1 clubs qualified automatically to the fourth round.

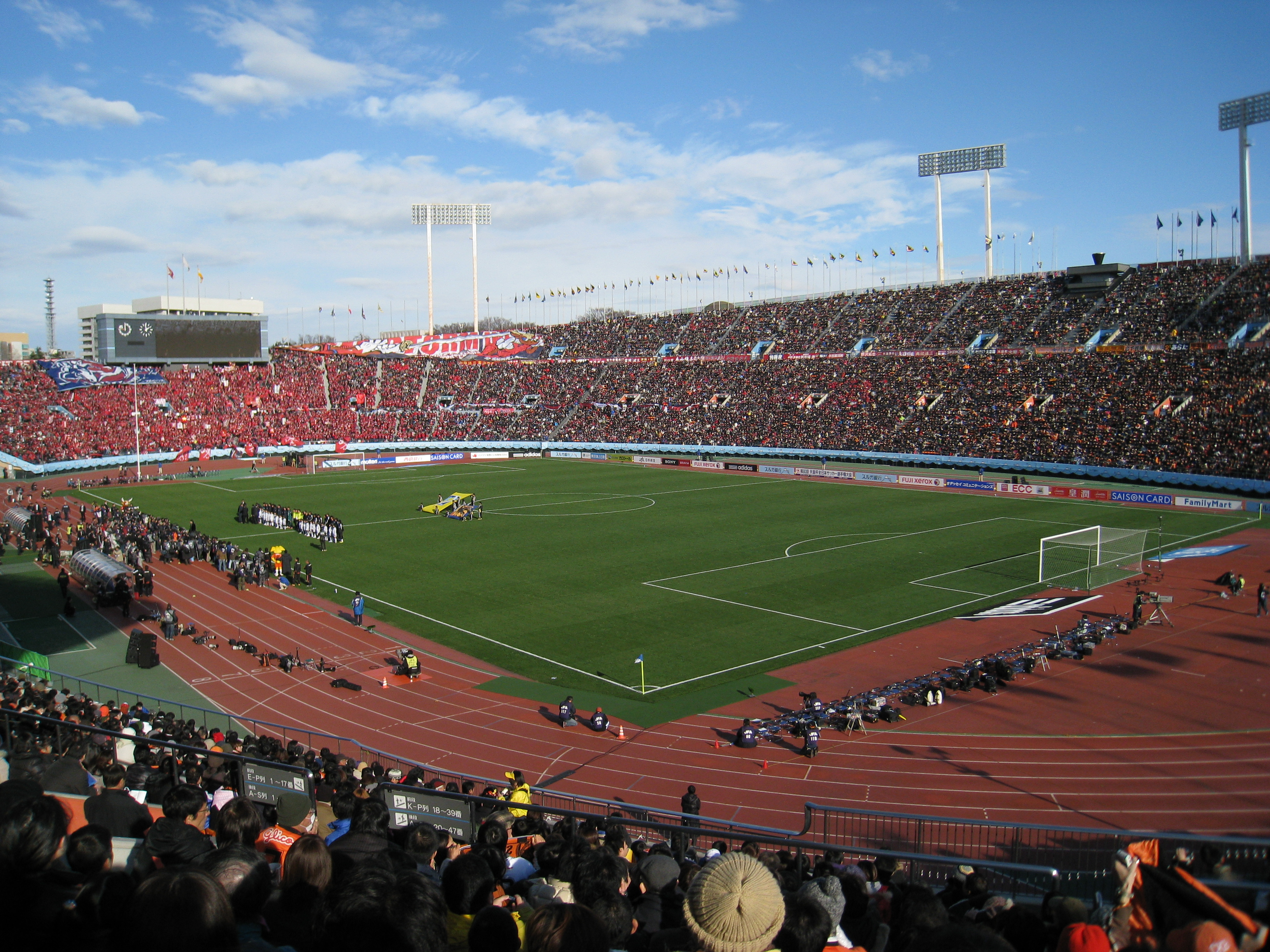
Tokyo National Stadium, the site of the 2005 Emperor‘s Cup final

== Schedule ==
| Round | Date | Fixture | Clubs |
|---|---|---|---|
| First Round | September 17 | 20 | 40→20 |
| Second Round | September 19 | 14 | 20+8→14 |
| Third Round | October 9 | 14 | 14+13+1→14 |
| Fourth Round | November 3 & November 9 | 16 | 14+18→16 |
| Fifth Round | December 10 & December 17 | 8 | 16→8 |
| Quarterfinals | December 24 | 4 | 8→4 |
| Semifinals | December 29 | 2 | 4→2 |
| Final | January 1, 2006 | 1 | 2→1 |

== Matches ==
=== First round ===
| Match No. | Home team | Score | Away team |
|---|---|---|---|
| 1 | TDK SC | 1–3 | Ehime FC |
| 2 | Kyushu Inax | 2–1 | Kashiwa Reysol Youth |
| 3 | Hitachi Tochigi Uva | 1–2 | Ain Food SC |
| 4 | Mitsubishi Nagasaki | 4–3 | Hatsushiba Hashimoto High School |
| 5 | Maruoka High School | 0–3 | Sagawa Express Chugoku |
| 6 | Biwako Seikei Sport College | 2–1 | Oita Trinita Youth |
| 7 | FC Central Chugoku | 3–1 | Japan Soccer College |
| 8 | Grulla Morioka | 2–4 | Sagawa Printing SC |
| 9 | Mie Chukyo University | 4–0 | Yamagata Chuo High School |
| 10 | Hachinohe University | 2–6 | Honda Lock SC |
| 11 | Rosso Kumamoto | 1–2 (a.e.t.) | Mitsubishi Mizushima |
| 12 | Banditonce Kobe SC | 1–0 | Antelope Shiojiri |
| 13 | Takada FC | 2–0 | Takamatsu FC |
| 14 | FC Ryukyu | 5–2 | Tokuyama University |
| 15 | SC Tottori | 1–0 | NIFS Kanoya |
| 16 | Alo's Hokuriku | 4–2 | Kansai University |
| 17 | Kochi University | 0–5 | FC Horikoshi |
| 18 | FC Primeiro | 2–1 | Kanazawa SC |
| 19 | Chukyo High School | 1–3 | Sanyo Electric Tokushima |
| 20 | Sapporo University | 2–0 | Nirasaki Astros |

=== Second round ===
| Match No. | Home team | Score | Away team |
|---|---|---|---|
| 21 | Ehime FC | 5–1 | Kyushu INAX FC |
| 22 | Ain Food SC | 4–1 | Mitsubishi Nagasaki |
| 23 | Sagawa Express Chugoku SC | 0–3 | Biwako Seikei Sport College |
| 24 | FC Central Chugoku | 0–5 | Sagawa Printing SC |
| 25 | Mie Chukyo University | 1–2 | Honda Lock SC. |
| 26 | Mitsubishi Mizushima | 2–0 (a.e.t.) | Banditonce Kobe SC |
| 27 | Takada FC | 1–6 | Fukuoka University |
| 28 | FC Ryukyu | 1–0 | Denso SC |
| 29 | SC Tottori | 2–3 | Sagawa Express Chugoku |
| 30 | Alo's Hokuriku | 3–1 | Hamamatsu University |
| 31 | FC Horikoshi | 2–0 | Saitama SC |
| 32 | FC Primeiro | 1–4 | Tsukuba University |
| 33 | Sanyo Electric Tokushima | 1–0 | Tokai University |
| 34 | Sapporo University | 0–1 | Sendai University |

=== Third round ===
| Match No. | Home team | Score | Away team |
|---|---|---|---|
| 35 | Thespa Kusatsu | 3–2 | Ehime FC |
| 36 | Mito HollyHock | 9–0 | Ain Food SC |
| 37 | Ventforet Kofu | 1–0 | Biwako Seikei Sport College |
| 38 | Avispa Fukuoka | 1–0 | Sagawa Printing SC |
| 39 | Tochigi SC | 0–1 | Honda Lock SC |
| 40 | Montedio Yamagata | 3–0 | Mitsubishi M. Mizushima FC |
| 41 | Honda FC | 3–1 | Fukuoka University |
| 42 | Kyoto Purple Sanga | 3–0 | FC Ryukyu |
| 43 | Consadole Sapporo | 0–2 | Sagawa Express Chugoku |
| 44 | Shonan Bellmare | 1–2 | Alo's Hokuriku |
| 45 | Yokohama FC | 1–0 | FC Horikoshi |
| 46 | Sagan Tosu | 1–0 | Tsukuba University |
| 47 | Tokushima Vortis | 7–0 | Sanyo Electric Tokushima |
| 48 | Vegalta Sendai | 2–2 (a.e.t.) (8–7p) | Sendai University |

=== Fourth round ===
| Match No. | Home team | Score | Away team |
|---|---|---|---|
| 49 | Kashima Antlers | 7–0 | Honda Lock SC |
| 50 | Oita Trinita | 3–2 | Tokyo Verdy 1969 |
| 51 | Nagoya Grampus Eight | 1–0 | Alo's Hokuriku |
| 52 | Omiya Ardija | 1–0 | Kyoto Purple Sanga |
| 53 | Urawa Red Diamonds | 2–1 | Montedio Yamagata |
| 54 | FC Tokyo | 2–0 | Avispa Fukuoka |
| 55 | Yokohama F. Marinos | 4–0 | Vegalta Sendai |
| 56 | Kawasaki Frontale | 5–1 | Sagawa Express Chugoku |
| 57 | Kashiwa Reysol | 2–2 (a.e.t.) (3–1p) | Vissel Kobe |
| 58 | Cerezo Osaka | 1–1 (a.e.t.) (4–1p) | Honda FC |
| 59 | Júbilo Iwata | 4–0 | Sagan Tosu |
| 60 | Albirex Niigata | 1–0 | Thespa Kusatsu |
| 61 | Sanfrecce Hiroshima | 3–1 | Mito HollyHock |
| 62 | Shimizu S-Pulse | 5–0 | Tokushima Vortis |
| 63 | Gamba Osaka | 3–3 (a.e.t.) (7–6p) | Yokohama FC |
| 64 | JEF United Chiba | 3–2 (a.e.t.) | Ventforet Kofu |

=== Fifth round ===
| Match No. | Home team | Score | Away team |
|---|---|---|---|
| 65 | Kashima Antlers | 3–0 | Oita Trinita |
| 66 | Nagoya Grampus Eight | 1–2 (a.e.t.) | Omiya Ardija |
| 67 | Urawa Red Diamonds | 2–0 | FC Tokyo |
| 68 | Yokohama F. Marinos | 2–3 (a.e.t.) | Kawasaki Frontale |
| 69 | JEF United Chiba | 2–5 | Cerezo Osaka |
| 70 | Júbilo Iwata | 2–1 | Albirex Niigata |
| 71 | Sanfrecce Hiroshima | 0–3 | Shimizu S-Pulse |
| 72 | Gamba Osaka | 5–3 | Kashiwa Reysol |

=== Quarter finals ===
| Match No. | Home team | Score | Away team |
|---|---|---|---|
| 73 | Kashima Antlers | 0–1 | Omiya Ardija |
| 74 | Urawa Red Diamonds | 2–0 | Kawasaki Frontale |
| 75 | Gamba Osaka | 1–3 | Cerezo Osaka |
| 76 | Júbilo Iwata | 0–1 | Shimizu S-Pulse |

=== Semi finals ===
2005-12-29

| Urawa Red Diamonds | 4 – 2 (a.e.t.) | Omiya Ardija |
|---|---|---|
| Marić 23'; Hasebe 62', 102'; Yamada 95' | | Kataoka 26'; Tomita 89' |

Tokyo National Stadium
Attendance: 31,441

2005-12-29

| Shimizu S-Pulse | 1 – 0 (a.e.t.) | Cerezo Osaka |
|---|---|---|
| Cho Jae-Jin 101' |

Shizuoka Stadium
Attendance: 11,270

=== Final ===
2006-01-01
14:00

| Urawa Red Diamonds | 2–1 | Shimizu S-Pulse |
|---|---|---|
| Horinouchi 39'; Marić 73' | | Ichikawa 76' |

Tokyo National Stadium
Attendance: 51,536
Referee: Toru Kamikawa
