= 2001 Emperor's Cup =

Tournament details
- Country: Japan

Final positions
- Champions: Shimizu S-Pulse
- Runners-up: Cerezo Osaka
- Semifinalists: Kawasaki Frontale; Urawa Red Diamonds

Statistics of Emperor's Cup in the 2001 season.

== Overview ==
It was contested by 80 teams, and Shimizu S-Pulse won the championship.

== Results ==
=== First round ===
- Ohara Gakuen JaSRA 1–3 Komazawa University
- Juntendo University 3–4 Sagawa Express
- Sun Life FC 0–4 Kunimi High School
- Saga Nanyo FC 1–0 Kibi International University
- Tokai University 2–0 Omiya Ardija
- Okinawa Kariyushi FC 1–2 Oita Trinita
- Nagasaki University 1–3 Nippon Steel Corporation Oita FC
- Tottori 1–0 Apple Sports College
- Saitama SC 0–14 Yokohama FC
- Muchz FC 0–7 Shonan Bellmare
- NTT Kumamoto 3–1 Yamagata FC
- Sony Sendai 0–1 Nara Sangyo University
- Kwansei Gakuin University 0–5 Kawasaki Frontale
- Fukuoka University 1–1(PK 1–3) Sagan Tosu
- Hosei University 1–0 Honda Lock
- Iwami FC 0–4 Jatco
- Gifu Kogyo High School 1–7 Mito HollyHock
- Osaka University of Health and Sport Sciences 0–4 Ventforet Kofu
- Denso 4–2 Akita Shogyo High School
- ALO's Hokuriku 2–1 Doto University
- Mind House Yokkaichi 1–3 Albirex Niigata
- Volca Kagoshima 2–3 Montedio Yamagata
- Tochigi SC 3–1 Fukui University of Technology
- Ehime FC 3–2 Fukuyama University
- FC Primeiro 0–4 Vegalta Sendai
- Nirasaki Astros 0–4 Kyoto Purple Sanga
- FC Kyoken Kyoto 4–0 Morioka Zebra
- Gunma Fortuna 6–1 Aster Aomori
- Kochi University 0–1 Honda FC
- Ryutsu Keizai University 3–1 Hannan University
- Kainan FC 1–1 (PK 4–2) Teihens FC
- Yamaguchi Teachers 0–8 Otsuka Pharmaceuticals

=== Second round ===
- Komazawa University 4–1 Kunimi High School
- Sagawa Express 10–0 Saga Nanyo FC
- Tokai University 4–3 Nippon Steel Corporation Oita FC
- Oita Trinita 2–1 Gainare Tottori
- Yokohama FC 5–0 NTT Kumamoto
- Shonan Bellmare 0–0(PK 3–4) Nara Sangyo University
- Kawasaki Frontale 1–0 Hosei University
- Sagan Tosu 1–0 Jatco SC
- Mito HollyHock 1–0 Denso
- Ventforet Kofu 1–0 ALO's Hokuriku
- Albirex Niigata 2–1 Tochigi SC
- Montedio Yamagata 1–0 Ehime FC
- Vegalta Sendai 4–1 FC Kyoken Kyoto
- Kyoto Purple Sanga 3–0 Gunma Fortuna
- Honda FC 6–0 Kainan FC
- Ryutsu Keizai University 2–3 Otsuka Pharmaceuticals

=== Third round ===
- Júbilo Iwata 3–2 Komazawa University
- Nagoya Grampus Eight 0–4 Sagawa Express
- Tokyo Verdy 2–0 Tokai University
- Cerezo Osaka 3–2 Oita Trinita
- Tokyo 0–1 Yokohama
- Kashima Antlers 6–0 Nara Sangyo University
- Consadole Sapporo 2–3 Kawasaki Frontale
- Kashiwa Reysol 1–2 Sagan Tosu
- Gamba Osaka 5–0 Mito HollyHock
- Urawa Red Diamonds 2–0 Ventforet Kofu
- Avispa Fukuoka 2–3 Albirex Niigata
- Vissel Kobe 1–0 Montedio Yamagata
- Sanfrecce Hiroshima 1–0 Vegalta Sendai
- Yokohama F. Marinos 0–1 Kyoto Purple Sanga
- Shimizu S-Pulse 2–1 Honda
- JEF United Ichihara 5–0 Otsuka Pharmaceuticals

=== Fourth round ===
- Júbilo Iwata 1–3 Tokyo Verdy
- Sagawa Express 0–2 Cerezo Osaka
- Yokohama 1–3 Kawasaki Frontale
- Kashima Antlers 6–0 Sagan Tosu
- Gamba Osaka 1–0 Albirex Niigata
- Urawa Red Diamonds 4–1 Vissel Kobe
- Sanfrecce Hiroshima 0–4 Shimizu S-Pulse
- Kyoto Purple Sanga 0–4 JEF United Ichihara

=== Quarter finals ===
- Tokyo Verdy 0–3 Kawasaki Frontale
- Cerezo Osaka 4–2 Kashima Antlers
- Gamba Osaka 0–2 Shimizu S-Pulse
- Urawa Red Diamonds 2–1 JEF United Ichihara

=== Semi finals ===
- Kawasaki Frontale 1–2 Shimizu S-Pulse
- Urawa Red Diamonds 0–1 Cerezo Osaka

=== Final ===
- Shimizu S-Pulse 3–2 Cerezo Osaka

Shimizu S-Pulse won the championship.
