= 2008 Shimizu S-Pulse season =

Shimizu S-Pulse
2008 season
- Manager: Kenta Hasegawa
- Stadium: Nihondaira Sports Stadium
- J. League 1: 5th
- Emperor's Cup: Quarterfinals
- J. League Cup: Runners-up
- Top goalscorer: Shinji Okazaki (10)

The 2008 S-Pulse season was S-Pulse's seventeenth season in existence and their sixteenth season in the J1 League. The club also competed in the Emperor's Cup and the J.League Cup. The team finished the season fifth in the league.

== Competitions ==
Competitions	Position
J. League 1	5th / 18 clubs
Emperor's Cup	Quarterfinals
J. League Cup	Runners-up

== Domestic results ==
=== J. League 1 ===
Match	Date	Venue	Opponents	Score
1	2008..			-
2	2008..			-
3	2008..			-
4	2008..			-
5	2008..			-
6	2008..			-
7	2008..			-
8	2008..			-
9	2008..			-
10	2008..			-
11	2008..			-
12	2008..			-
13	2008..			-
14	2008..			-
15	2008..			-
16	2008..			-
17	2008..			-
18	2008..			-
19	2008..			-
20	2008..			-
21	2008..			-
22	2008..			-
23	2008..			-
24	2008..			-
25	2008..			-
26	2008..			-
27	2008..			-
28	2008..			-
29	2008..			-
30	2008..			-
31	2008..			-
32	2008..			-
33	2008..			-
34	2008..			-

=== Emperor's Cup ===
Match	Date	Venue	Opponents	Score
4th Round	2008..			-
5th Round	2008..			-
Quarterfinals	2008..			-

=== J. League Cup ===
Match	Date	Venue	Opponents	Score
GL-B-1	2008..			-
GL-B-2	2008..			-
GL-B-3	2008..			-
GL-B-4	2008..			-
GL-B-5	2008..			-
GL-B-6	2008..			-
Quarterfinals-1	2008..			-
Quarterfinals-2	2008..			-
Semifinals-1	2008..			-
Semifinals-2	2008..			-
Final	2008..			-

== Player statistics ==
No.	Pos.	Player	D.o.B. (Age)	Height / Weight	J. League 1		Emperor's Cup		J. League Cup		Total	
No.	Pos.	Player	D.o.B. (Age)	Height / Weight	Apps	Goals	Apps	Goals	Apps	Goals	Apps	Goals
1	GK	Makoto Kakegawa	May 23, 1973 (aged 34)	cm / kg	0	0						
2	DF	Arata Kodama	October 8, 1982 (aged 25)	cm / kg	26	0						
3	DF	Takahiro Yamanishi	April 2, 1976 (aged 31)	cm / kg	7	0						
4	DF	Kazumichi Takagi	November 21, 1980 (aged 27)	cm / kg	34	1						
5	DF	Keisuke Iwashita	September 24, 1986 (aged 21)	cm / kg	18	2						
6	MF	Marcos Paulo	May 11, 1977 (aged 30)	cm / kg	20	1						
7	MF	Teruyoshi Ito	August 31, 1974 (aged 33)	cm / kg	34	0						
8	MF	Takuma Edamura	November 16, 1986 (aged 21)	cm / kg	30	8						
9	FW	Takuro Yajima	March 28, 1984 (aged 23)	cm / kg	24	5						
10	MF	Jungo Fujimoto	March 24, 1984 (aged 23)	cm / kg	18	2						
11	FW	Mitsuhiro Toda	September 10, 1977 (aged 30)	cm / kg	8	1						
13	MF	Akihiro Hyodo	May 12, 1982 (aged 25)	cm / kg	23	1						
14	MF	Jumpei Takaki	September 1, 1982 (aged 25)	cm / kg	5	0						
15	DF	Shinji Tsujio	December 23, 1985 (aged 22)	cm / kg	3	0						
16	MF	Takuya Honda	April 17, 1985 (aged 22)	cm / kg	16	1						
17	MF	Fernandinho	January 13, 1981 (aged 27)	cm / kg	13	1						
18	FW	Marcos Aurélio	February 10, 1984 (aged 24)	cm / kg	9	0						
19	FW	Kazuki Hara	January 5, 1985 (aged 23)	cm / kg	26	6						
20	FW	Akinori Nishizawa	June 18, 1976 (aged 31)	cm / kg	21	5						
21	GK	Yohei Nishibe	December 1, 1980 (aged 27)	cm / kg	21	0						
22	FW	Genki Omae	December 10, 1989 (aged 18)	cm / kg	2	0						
23	FW	Shinji Okazaki	April 16, 1986 (aged 21)	cm / kg	27	10						
24	MF	Yuki Nagahata	May 2, 1989 (aged 18)	cm / kg	0	0						
25	DF	Daisuke Ichikawa	May 14, 1980 (aged 27)	cm / kg	27	0						
26	DF	Naoaki Aoyama	July 18, 1986 (aged 21)	cm / kg	33	1						
27	DF	Tomonobu Hiroi	January 11, 1985 (aged 23)	cm / kg	0	0						
28	MF	Masaki Yamamoto	August 24, 1987 (aged 20)	cm / kg	11	2						
29	GK	Kaito Yamamoto	July 10, 1985 (aged 22)	cm / kg	13	0						
30	GK	Yohei Takeda	June 30, 1987 (aged 20)	cm / kg	0	0						
31	FW	Shun Nagasawa	August 25, 1988 (aged 19)	cm / kg	0	0						
32	DF	Katsuhiko Sano	April 30, 1988 (aged 19)	cm / kg	0	0						
33	FW	Kim Dong-Sub	March 29, 1989 (aged 18)	cm / kg	0	0						

== Other pages ==
- (in Japanese) J. League official site
