= 2009 Shimizu S-Pulse season =

Shimizu S-Pulse
2009 season
- Manager: Kenta Hasegawa
- Stadium: Outsourcing Stadium Nihondaira
- J. League 1: 7th
- Emperor's Cup: Semifinals
- J. League Cup: Semifinals
- Top goalscorer: Shinji Okazaki (14)

The 2009 S-Pulse season was S-Pulse's eighteenth season in existence and their seventeenth season in the J1 League. The club also competed in the Emperor's Cup and the J.League Cup. The team finished the season seventh in the league.

== Competitions ==
Competitions	Position
J. League 1	7th / 18 clubs
Emperor's Cup	Semifinals
J. League Cup	Semifinals

== Player statistics ==
No.	Pos.	Player	D.o.B. (Age)	Height / Weight	J. League 1		Emperor's Cup		J. League Cup		Total	
No.	Pos.	Player	D.o.B. (Age)	Height / Weight	Apps	Goals	Apps	Goals	Apps	Goals	Apps	Goals
1	GK	Makoto Kakegawa	May 23, 1973 (aged 35)	cm / kg	0	0						
2	DF	Arata Kodama	October 8, 1982 (aged 26)	cm / kg	30	1						
3	DF	Naoaki Aoyama	July 18, 1986 (aged 22)	cm / kg	23	1						
4	DF	Kosuke Ota	July 23, 1987 (aged 21)	cm / kg	23	0						
5	DF	Keisuke Iwashita	September 24, 1986 (aged 22)	cm / kg	29	5						
6	MF	Marcos Paulo	May 11, 1977 (aged 31)	cm / kg	17	0						
7	MF	Teruyoshi Ito	August 31, 1974 (aged 34)	cm / kg	30	0						
8	MF	Takuma Edamura	November 16, 1986 (aged 22)	cm / kg	32	6						
9	FW	Yuichiro Nagai	February 14, 1979 (aged 30)	cm / kg	8	0						
10	MF	Jungo Fujimoto	March 24, 1984 (aged 24)	cm / kg	27	1						
11	FW	Kazuki Hara	January 5, 1985 (aged 24)	cm / kg	25	3						
13	MF	Akihiro Hyodo	May 12, 1982 (aged 26)	cm / kg	29	1						
14	MF	Jumpei Takaki	September 1, 1982 (aged 26)	cm / kg	12	0						
15	DF	Shinji Tsujio	December 23, 1985 (aged 23)	cm / kg	9	0						
16	MF	Takuya Honda	April 17, 1985 (aged 23)	cm / kg	18	0						
17	MF	Masaki Yamamoto	August 24, 1987 (aged 21)	cm / kg	24	1						
18	FW	Frode Johnsen	March 17, 1974 (aged 34)	cm / kg	33	9						
19	FW	Yu Kijima	May 18, 1986 (aged 22)	cm / kg	0	0						
20	FW	Shun Nagasawa	August 25, 1988 (aged 20)	cm / kg	5	0						
21	GK	Yohei Nishibe	December 1, 1980 (aged 28)	cm / kg	14	0						
22	FW	Genki Omae	December 10, 1989 (aged 19)	cm / kg	0	0						
23	FW	Shinji Okazaki	April 16, 1986 (aged 22)	cm / kg	34	14						
24	MF	Yuki Nagahata	May 2, 1989 (aged 19)	cm / kg	0	0						
25	DF	Daisuke Ichikawa	May 14, 1980 (aged 28)	cm / kg	25	1						
26	DF	Yasuhiro Hiraoka	May 23, 1986 (aged 22)	cm / kg	3	0						
27	DF	Tomonobu Hiroi	January 11, 1985 (aged 24)	cm / kg	1	0						
28	MF	Ryo Takeuchi	March 8, 1991 (aged 17)	cm / kg	0	0						
29	GK	Kaito Yamamoto	July 10, 1985 (aged 23)	cm / kg	20	0						
30	FW	Kim Dong-Sub	March 29, 1989 (aged 19)	cm / kg	0	0						
31	GK	Yohei Takeda	June 30, 1987 (aged 21)	cm / kg	0	0						
32	DF	Katsuhiko Sano	April 30, 1988 (aged 20)	cm / kg	0	0						

== Other pages ==
- (in Japanese) J. League official site
