= 2007 Shimizu S-Pulse season =

Shimizu S-Pulse
2007 season
- Manager: Kenta Hasegawa
- Stadium: Nihondaira Sports Stadium
- J. League 1: 4th
- Emperor's Cup: Quarterfinals
- J. League Cup: GL-B 2nd
- Top goalscorer: Cho Jae-Jin (13)

The 2007 S-Pulse season was S-Pulse's sixteenth season in existence and their fifteenth season in the J1 League. The club also competed in the Emperor's Cup and the J.League Cup. The team finished the season fourth in the league.

== Competitions ==
Competitions	Position
J. League 1	4th / 18 clubs
Emperor's Cup	Quarterfinals
J. League Cup	GL-B 2nd / 4 clubs

== Domestic results ==
=== J. League 1 ===
Match	Date	Venue	Opponents	Score
1	2007..			-
2	2007..			-
3	2007..			-
4	2007..			-
5	2007..			-
6	2007..			-
7	2007..			-
8	2007..			-
9	2007..			-
10	2007..			-
11	2007..			-
12	2007..			-
13	2007..			-
14	2007..			-
15	2007..			-
16	2007..			-
17	2007..			-
18	2007..			-
19	2007..			-
20	2007..			-
21	2007..			-
22	2007..			-
23	2007..			-
24	2007..			-
25	2007..			-
26	2007..			-
27	2007..			-
28	2007..			-
29	2007..			-
30	2007..			-
31	2007..			-
32	2007..			-
33	2007..			-
34	2007..			-

=== Emperor's Cup ===
Match	Date	Venue	Opponents	Score
4th Round	2007..			-
5th Round	2007..			-
Quarterfinals	2007..			-

=== J. League Cup ===
Match	Date	Venue	Opponents	Score
GL-B-1	2007..			-
GL-B-2	2007..			-
GL-B-3	2007..			-
GL-B-4	2007..			-
GL-B-5	2007..			-
GL-B-6	2007..			-

== Player statistics ==
No.	Pos.	Player	D.o.B. (Age)	Height / Weight	J. League 1		Emperor's Cup		J. League Cup		Total	
No.	Pos.	Player	D.o.B. (Age)	Height / Weight	Apps	Goals	Apps	Goals	Apps	Goals	Apps	Goals
1	GK	Makoto Kakegawa	May 23, 1973 (aged 33)	cm / kg	0	0						
2	DF	Arata Kodama	October 8, 1982 (aged 24)	cm / kg	33	0						
3	DF	Takahiro Yamanishi	April 2, 1976 (aged 30)	cm / kg	1	0						
4	DF	Kazumichi Takagi	November 21, 1980 (aged 26)	cm / kg	34	0						
5	DF	Keisuke Iwashita	September 24, 1986 (aged 20)	cm / kg	11	1						
6	MF	Kota Sugiyama	January 24, 1985 (aged 22)	cm / kg	11	0						
7	MF	Teruyoshi Ito	August 31, 1974 (aged 32)	cm / kg	34	1						
8	MF	Kohei Hiramatsu	April 19, 1980 (aged 26)	cm / kg	0	0						
9	FW	Takuro Yajima	March 28, 1984 (aged 22)	cm / kg	26	7						
10	MF	Jungo Fujimoto	March 24, 1984 (aged 22)	cm / kg	34	7						
11	FW	Mitsuhiro Toda	September 10, 1977 (aged 29)	cm / kg	4	0						
13	MF	Akihiro Hyodo	May 12, 1982 (aged 24)	cm / kg	31	2						
14	MF	Jumpei Takaki	September 1, 1982 (aged 24)	cm / kg	11	0						
15	FW	Yoshikiyo Kuboyama	July 21, 1976 (aged 30)	cm / kg	0	0						
16	MF	Takuma Edamura	November 16, 1986 (aged 20)	cm / kg	28	3						
17	MF	Fernandinho	January 13, 1981 (aged 26)	cm / kg	33	9						
18	FW	Cho Jae-Jin	July 9, 1981 (aged 25)	cm / kg	28	13						
19	FW	Kazuki Hara	January 5, 1985 (aged 22)	cm / kg	1	0						
20	FW	Akinori Nishizawa	June 18, 1976 (aged 30)	cm / kg	22	0						
21	GK	Yohei Nishibe	December 1, 1980 (aged 26)	cm / kg	33	0						
22	MF	Keisuke Ota	July 23, 1981 (aged 25)	cm / kg	2	0						
23	FW	Shinji Okazaki	April 16, 1986 (aged 20)	cm / kg	21	5						
24	DF	Yasuhiro Hiraoka	May 23, 1986 (aged 20)	cm / kg	3	0						
25	DF	Daisuke Ichikawa	May 14, 1980 (aged 26)	cm / kg	33	4						
26	DF	Naoaki Aoyama	July 18, 1986 (aged 20)	cm / kg	30	1						
27	DF	Tomonobu Hiroi	January 11, 1985 (aged 22)	cm / kg	0	0						
28	MF	Masaki Yamamoto	August 24, 1987 (aged 19)	cm / kg	0	0						
29	GK	Kaito Yamamoto	July 10, 1985 (aged 21)	cm / kg	1	0						
30	GK	Yohei Takeda	June 30, 1987 (aged 19)	cm / kg	0	0						
31	FW	Shun Nagasawa	August 25, 1988 (aged 18)	cm / kg	1	0						
32	DF	Katsuhiko Sano	April 30, 1988 (aged 18)	cm / kg	0	0						
33	FW	Alexandre	July 24, 1976 (aged 30)	cm / kg	0	0						
33	FW	Anderson	November 15, 1981 (aged 25)	cm / kg	1	0						
34	FW	Kim Dong-Sub	March 29, 1989 (aged 17)	cm / kg	0	0						

== Other pages ==
- (in Japanese) J. League official site
