= 2006 Shimizu S-Pulse season =

Shimizu S-Pulse
2006 season
- Manager: Kenta Hasegawa
- Stadium: Nihondaira Sports Stadium
- J. League 1: 4th
- Emperor's Cup: Quarterfinals
- J. League Cup: GL-C 2nd
- Top goalscorer: Cho Jae-Jin (16)

The 2006 S-Pulse season was S-Pulse's fifteenth season in existence and their fourteenth season in the J1 League. The club also competed in the Emperor's Cup and the J.League Cup. The team finished the season fourth in the league.

== Competitions ==
Competitions	Position
J. League 1	4th / 18 clubs
Emperor's Cup	Quarterfinals
J. League Cup	GL-C 2nd / 4 clubs

== Domestic results ==
=== J. League 1 ===
Match	Date	Venue	Opponents	Score
1	2006..			-
2	2006..			-
3	2006..			-
4	2006..			-
5	2006..			-
6	2006..			-
7	2006..			-
8	2006..			-
9	2006..			-
10	2006..			-
11	2006..			-
12	2006..			-
13	2006..			-
14	2006..			-
15	2006..			-
16	2006..			-
17	2006..			-
18	2006..			-
19	2006..			-
20	2006..			-
21	2006..			-
22	2006..			-
23	2006..			-
24	2006..			-
25	2006..			-
26	2006..			-
27	2006..			-
28	2006..			-
29	2006..			-
30	2006..			-
31	2006..			-
32	2006..			-
33	2006..			-
34	2006..			-

=== Emperor's Cup ===
Match	Date	Venue	Opponents	Score
4th Round	2006..			-
5th Round	2006..			-
Quarterfinals	2006..			-

=== J. League Cup ===
Match	Date	Venue	Opponents	Score
GL-C-1	2006..			-
GL-C-2	2006..			-
GL-C-3	2006..			-
GL-C-4	2006..			-
GL-C-5	2006..			-
GL-C-6	2006..			-

== Player statistics ==
No.	Pos.	Player	D.o.B. (Age)	Height / Weight	J. League 1		Emperor's Cup		J. League Cup		Total	
No.	Pos.	Player	D.o.B. (Age)	Height / Weight	Apps	Goals	Apps	Goals	Apps	Goals	Apps	Goals
1	GK	Makoto Kakegawa	May 23, 1973 (aged 32)	cm / kg	0	0						
2	DF	Toshihide Saito	April 20, 1973 (aged 32)	cm / kg	8	1						
3	DF	Takahiro Yamanishi	April 2, 1976 (aged 29)	cm / kg	32	0						
4	DF	Kazumichi Takagi	November 21, 1980 (aged 25)	cm / kg	32	0						
5	DF	Keisuke Iwashita	September 24, 1986 (aged 19)	cm / kg	2	0						
6	MF	Kota Sugiyama	January 24, 1985 (aged 21)	cm / kg	15	0						
7	MF	Teruyoshi Ito	August 31, 1974 (aged 31)	cm / kg	34	2						
8	MF	Kohei Hiramatsu	April 19, 1980 (aged 25)	cm / kg	6	0						
9	FW	Takuro Yajima	March 28, 1984 (aged 21)	cm / kg	19	3						
10	MF	Jungo Fujimoto	March 24, 1984 (aged 21)	cm / kg	28	8						
11	DF	Ryuzo Morioka	October 7, 1975 (aged 30)	cm / kg	10	0						
13	MF	Akihiro Hyodo	May 12, 1982 (aged 23)	cm / kg	21	5						
14	MF	Jumpei Takaki	September 1, 1982 (aged 23)	cm / kg	26	2						
15	FW	Yoshikiyo Kuboyama	July 21, 1976 (aged 29)	cm / kg	22	1						
16	MF	Takuma Edamura	November 16, 1986 (aged 19)	cm / kg	34	9						
17	FW	Marquinhos	March 23, 1976 (aged 29)	cm / kg	29	11						
18	FW	Cho Jae-Jin	July 9, 1981 (aged 24)	cm / kg	32	16						
19	DF	Takumi Wada	October 20, 1981 (aged 24)	cm / kg	4	0						
20	MF	Yukihiko Sato	May 11, 1976 (aged 29)	cm / kg	0	0						
21	GK	Yohei Nishibe	December 1, 1980 (aged 25)	cm / kg	34	0						
22	MF	Keisuke Ota	July 23, 1981 (aged 24)	cm / kg	2	0						
23	FW	Shinji Okazaki	April 16, 1986 (aged 19)	cm / kg	7	0						
24	DF	Yasuhiro Hiraoka	May 23, 1986 (aged 19)	cm / kg	4	0						
25	DF	Daisuke Ichikawa	May 14, 1980 (aged 25)	cm / kg	31	1						
26	DF	Naoaki Aoyama	July 18, 1986 (aged 19)	cm / kg	29	0						
27	FW	Shunichiro Zaitsu	January 23, 1987 (aged 19)	cm / kg	0	0						
28	MF	Masaki Yamamoto	August 24, 1987 (aged 18)	cm / kg	1	0						
29	GK	Kaito Yamamoto	July 10, 1985 (aged 20)	cm / kg	0	0						
30	GK	Yohei Takeda	June 30, 1987 (aged 18)	cm / kg	0	0						
33	FW	Alexandre	July 24, 1976 (aged 29)	cm / kg	7	0						

== Other pages ==
- (in Japanese) J. League official site
