= 2010 Emperor's Cup final =

2010 Emperor's Cup Final
Kashima Antlers	Shimizu S-Pulse
2	1
- Date: January 1, 2011
- Venue: National Stadium, Tokyo

2010 Emperor's Cup Final was the 90th final of the Emperor's Cup competition. The final was played at National Stadium in Tokyo on January 1, 2011. Kashima Antlers won the championship.

== Match details ==
January 1, 2011

Kashima Antlers	2–1	Shimizu S-Pulse
Fellype Gabriel 26'; Takuya Nozawa 77'	Report	Johnsen 59'

National Stadium

Kashima Antlers
GK	21	(Japan) Hitoshi Sogahata
DF	7	(Japan) Toru Araiba	(substituted off) 88'
DF	19	(Japan) Masahiko Inoha
DF	6	(Japan) Kōji Nakata
DF	32	(Japan) Tomohiko Miyazaki
MF	15	(Japan) Takeshi Aoki
MF	40	(Japan) Mitsuo Ogasawara
MF	8	(Japan) Takuya Nozawa
MF	11	(Brazil) Fellype Gabriel	(substituted off) 63'
FW	9	(Japan) Yuya Osako	(substituted off) 90+2'
FW	13	(Japan) Shinzo Koroki
Substitutes:
GK	1	(Japan) Tetsu Sugiyama
DF	4	(Japan) Go Oiwa
DF	24	(Japan) Takefumi Toma	(substituted on) 88'
MF	10	(Japan) Masashi Motoyama	(substituted on) 63'
MF	16	(Japan) Yuji Funayama
MF	25	(Japan) Yasushi Endo	(substituted on) 90+2'
FW	17	(Japan) Ryuta Sasaki
Manager:
(Brazil) Oswaldo Oliveira

Shimizu S-Pulse
GK	1	(Japan) Kaito Yamamoto
DF	25	(Japan) Daisuke Ichikawa
DF	5	(Japan) Keisuke Iwashita
DF	33	(Australia) Bosnar
DF	4	(Japan) Kosuke Ota
MF	17	(Japan) Masaki Yamamoto	(substituted off) 67'
MF	16	(Japan) Takuya Honda	(substituted off) 87'
MF	30	(Japan) Shinji Ono	(substituted off) 82'
FW	23	(Japan) Shinji Okazaki
FW	18	(Norway) Johnsen
FW	10	(Japan) Jungo Fujimoto
Substitutes:
GK	31	(Japan) Yohei Takeda
DF	26	(Japan) Yasuhiro Hiraoka
DF	2	(Japan) Arata Kodama
MF	7	(Japan) Teruyoshi Ito	(substituted on) 67'
MF	15	(Japan) Shinji Tsujio
FW	22	(Japan) Genki Omae	(substituted on) 87'
FW	11	(Japan) Kazuki Hara	(substituted on) 82'
Manager:
(Japan) Kenta Hasegawa

== See also ==
- 2010 Emperor's Cup
