= Shizuoka derby =

Local derby in Shizuoka

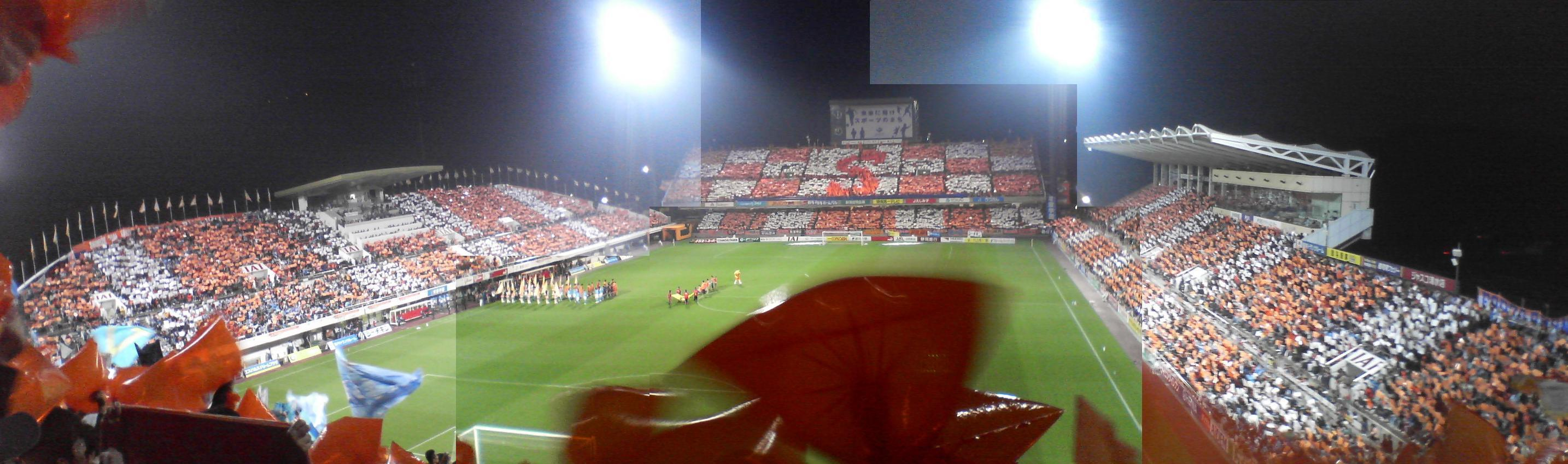
- Shizuoka derby, 3 May 2007
- Location: Shizuoka Prefecture
- Teams: Shimizu S-Pulse; Júbilo Iwata
- First meeting: 16 October 1993; J.League Cup; Shimizu S-Pulse 2–0 Júbilo Iwata
- Latest meeting: 9 April 2025; J.League Cup; Júbilo Iwata 2–1 Shimizu S-Pulse
- Stadiums: IAI Stadium Nihondaira; Shizuoka Stadium; Yamaha Stadium

Statistics
- Total meetings: 71
- Most wins: Júbilo Iwata (33)
- Top scorer: Masashi Nakayama (17)
- All-time series: Shimizu S-Pulse: 30; Draw: 8 Júbilo Iwata: 33
- Largest victory: 22 August 2009; J.League Division 1 Shimizu S-Pulse 5–1 Júbilo Iwata; 23 March 2013; J.League Cup; Júbilo Iwata 5–1 Shimizu S-Pulse; 7 October 2018; J1 League; Shimizu S-Pulse 5–1 Júbilo Iwata

The Shizuoka derby (静岡ダービー, Shizuoka dābī) is the local derby in Shizuoka Prefecture, Japan, between fierce rivals Shimizu S-Pulse (based in Shizuoka City) and Júbilo Iwata (based in Iwata City).

== History ==
Yamaha Motor SC was founded in 1972 by the employees of Yamaha Motor Company. Shimizu S-Pulse was founded in 1991 as the only J.League club not based on a corporate club, and Yamaha Motor changed club name to Júbilo Iwata and became professional in 1993.

The Shizuoka derby is known as one of the most bitter derby matches in Japan. Both Shimizu and Iwata had hoped to become original clubs in the 1993 J.League, but Iwata which had a proven track record as an amateur wasn't selected in favor of the new club Shimizu. Shimizu caused controversy by signing four Iwata players Katsumi Oenoki, Fumiaki Aoshima, Masao Sugimoto and Brazilian Ademir Santos in preparation for the professional league. On the 28 May 2011 derby, the Iwata's ultras have slandered Iranian manager Afshin Ghotbi for criticising nuclear program of Iran.

== Honours ==
As of 9 April 2025

Competition	Shimizu	Iwata
JSL Division 1 / J1 League	0	4
JSL Division 2 / JFL (1992–1998) / J2 League	1	3
Emperor's Cup	1	2
JSL Cup / J.League Cup	1	2
Japanese Super Cup	2	3
Japanese Regional Football League Competition	0	2
Asian Club Championship / AFC Champions League	0	1
Asian Cup Winners' Cup	1	0
Asian Super Cup	0	1
J.League Cup / Copa Sudamericana Championship	0	1
Total	5	19

== Statistics ==
As of 9 April 2025, competitive matches only

Competition	Played	Shimizu wins	Draws	Iwata wins	Shimizu goals	Iwata goals
J1 League	52	20	7	25	60	71
J.League Championship	2	1	0	1	3	3
J2 League	2	1	1	0	3	2
Emperor's Cup	3	1	1	1	4	5
J.League Cup	12	6	0	6	17	19
Total	71	29	9	33	87	100

== Matches ==
=== J1 League ===
#	Date	Home scorers	Home	Result	Away	Away scorers	Report
1	6 April 1994	Toninho	Shimizu	1–0 (g.g.)	Iwata		Report
2	18 May 1994	Vanenburg, T. Fujita, Schillaci (2)	Iwata	4–2	Shimizu	Ronaldo, Nagashima	Report
3	3 September 1994		Shimizu	0–1 (g.g.)	Iwata	T. Fujita	Report
4	2 November 1994	Schillaci (2)	Iwata	2–1	Shimizu	Toninho	Report
5	22 April 1995	Toninho, Sawanobori	Shimizu	2–3 (g.g.)	Iwata	Schillaci (2), Oishi	Report
6	8 July 1995	Schillaci (2)	Iwata	2–1	Shimizu	Dias	Report
7	26 August 1995		Shimizu	0–2	Iwata	M. Nakayama (2)	Report
8	18 October 1995	Schillaci (2), M. Nakayama	Iwata	3–2 (g.g.)	Shimizu	Marco, K. Hasegawa	Report
9	27 April 1996	unknown (o.g.)	Shimizu	1–2 (g.g.)	Iwata	H. Suzuki, T. Fujita	Report
10	9 November 1996	Schillaci	Iwata	1–2	Shimizu	Ito (2)	Report
11	19 July 1997	Morioka	Shimizu	1–2	Iwata	T. Fujita, Adilson	Report
12	4 October 1997	M. Nakayama (2)	Iwata	2–0	Shimizu		Report
13	2 May 1998	Fabinho, Alex	Shimizu	2–1	Iwata	M. Nakayama	Report
14	31 October 1998	M. Nakayama	Iwata	1–0	Shimizu		Report
15	24 April 1999	Sawanobori, Ando	Shimizu	2–5	Iwata	Fukunishi, M. Nakayama (2), Kawaguchi, Oku	Report
16	14 August 1999		Iwata	0–1	Shimizu	Alex	Report
17	27 May 2000		Shimizu	0–2	Iwata	Ito, Alex	Report
18	11 November 2000	Alex	Shimizu	1–0 (g.g.)	Iwata		Report
19	12 May 2001	Hiramatsu	Shimizu	1–0 (g.g.)	Iwata		Report
20	1 September 2001	Fukunishi (2), Maeda	Iwata	3–1	Shimizu	Baron	Report
21	24 July 2002	Takahara, M. Nakayama (2)	Iwata	3–1	Shimizu	Morioka	Report
22	18 September 2002		Shimizu	0–2	Iwata	M. Nakayama (2)	Report
23	19 April 2003		Shimizu	0–2	Iwata	T. Fujita, Gral	Report
24	23 August 2003	Gral	Iwata	1–0	Shimizu		Report
25	2 May 2004	Ke. Ota	Shimizu	1–0	Iwata		Report
26	2 October 2004	Gral	Iwata	1–2	Shimizu	J. J. Cho (2)	Report
27	2 April 2005	Cullen	Iwata	1–1	Shimizu	Morioka	Report
28	22 October 2005	Hyodo	Shimizu	1–1	Iwata	Nishi	Report
29	29 July 2006	Takaki, Edamura	Shimizu	2–0	Iwata		Report
30	26 November 2006	Maeda	Iwata	1–0	Shimizu		Report
31	3 May 2007	J. J. Cho (2)	Shimizu	2–1	Iwata	M. Nakayama	Report
32	1 September 2007		Iwata	0–1	Shimizu	J. J. Cho	Report
33	3 May 2008	Hara	Shimizu	1–1	Iwata	Komano	Report
34	8 November 2008	Maeda	Iwata	1–0	Shimizu		Report
35	19 April 2009	Lee (2), Maeda	Iwata	3–0	Shimizu		Report
36	22 August 2009	Iwashita, Edamura (2), Hyodo, Okazaki	Shimizu	5–1	Iwata	Maeda	Report
37	17 July 2010		Shimizu	0–0	Iwata		Report
38	22 August 2010	Gilsinho, Yamamoto	Iwata	2–1	Shimizu	Ko. Ota	Report
39	28 May 2011		Shimizu	0–0	Iwata		Report
40	10 September 2011	Komano, Maeda	Iwata	2–1	Shimizu	Omae	Report
41	14 April 2012	Takagi, Omae (2)	Shimizu	3–2	Iwata	B. K. Cho, Yamamoto	Report
42	6 October 2012		Iwata	0–1	Shimizu	Muramatsu	Report
43	13 April 2013	Muramatsu	Shimizu	1–0	Iwata		Report
44	27 October 2013		Iwata	0–1	Shimizu	Omae	Report
45	1 April 2017	Morishita, Musaev, Kawabe	Iwata	3–1	Shimizu	Jong	Report
46	14 October 2017		Shimizu	0–3	Iwata	Adaílton, Nakamura, Yamada	Report
47	7 April 2018		Iwata	0–0	Shimizu		Report
48	7 October 2018	Kitagawa (2), Douglas (2), Murata	Shimizu	5–1	Iwata	Taguchi	Report
49	14 April 2019	Rodrigues	Iwata	1–2	Shimizu	Jong, Kitagawa	Report
50	2 November 2019	Oi (o.g.)	Shimizu	1–2	Iwata	Fujikawa, Adaílton	Report
51	26 February 2022	Yuto Suzuki	Iwata	1–2	Shimizu	Yuito Suzuki, K. Nakayama	Report
52	22 October 2022	Thiago Santana	Shimizu	1–1	Iwata	Germain	Report

=== J.League Championship ===
#	Date	Home scorers	Home	Result	Away	Away scorers	Report
1	4 December 1999	M. Nakayama (2)	Iwata	2–1 (g.g.)	Shimizu	Sawanobori	Report
2	11 December 1999	Sawanobori, Fabinho	Shimizu	2–1 (g.g.) (2–4 p)	Iwata	Hattori	Report

=== J2 League ===
#	Date	Home scorers	Home	Result	Away	Away scorers	Report
1	18 March 2023	Goto, Matsumoto	Iwata	2–2	Shimizu	Thiago Santana (2)	Report
2	7 October 2023	Inui	Shimizu	1–0	Iwata		Report

=== Emperor's Cup ===
#	Date	Home scorers	Home	Result	Away	Away scorers	Report
1	27 December 2003	Ahn (2)	Shimizu	2–4	Iwata	Gral, Naruoka (2), Maeda	Report
2	24 December 2005		Iwata	0–1	Shimizu	Marquinhos	Report
3	18 September 2019	Matsumoto	Iwata	1–1 (a.e.t.) (3–4 p)	Shimizu	D. Ogawa (o.g.)	Report

=== J.League Cup ===
#	Date	Home scorers	Home	Result	Away	Away scorers	Report
1	16 October 1993	Sugimoto, Naito	Shimizu	2–0	Iwata		Report
2	15 July 1998		Shimizu	0–2	Iwata	T. Fujita, Takahara	Report
3	25 May 2008	Hara, Fujimoto (2), Nishizawa	Shimizu	4–2	Iwata	Cullen, M. Nakayama	Report
4	8 June 2008	Cullen, Gilsinho	Iwata	2–0	Shimizu		Report
5	6 June 2010	Nagai, Hiraoka	Shimizu	2–0	Iwata		Report
6	23 March 2013	Kanazono, Matsuura, R. Yamazaki (3)	Iwata	5–1	Shimizu	Ishige	Report
7	10 May 2017	Kaneko, Kitagawa	Shimizu	2–4	Iwata	Adaílton (2), Y. Fujita, Uehara	Report
8	7 March 2018	Jong	Shimizu	1–0	Iwata		Report
9	9 May 2018	Nakano (2)	Iwata	2–1	Shimizu	Yu Hasegawa	Report
10	13 March 2019	Taki	Shimizu	1–0	Iwata		Report
11	22 May 2019		Iwata	0–2	Shimizu	Takahashi, Ominami (o.g.)	Report
12	9 April 2025	Kawasaki, Ricardo Graça	Iwata	2–1	Shimizu	Ahmed Ahmedov	Report

=== Friendly ===
#	Date	Home scorers	Home	Result	Away	Away scorers	Report
1	27 February 1994	Vanenburg	Iwata	1–2	Shimizu	Toninho, Nagashima	Report
2	3 March 1996		Shimizu	0–2	Iwata	Nanami, M. Nakayama	Report
3	13 July 1996	Takeda	Iwata	1–2	Shimizu	Mukojima, Oliva	Report
4	1 March 1997	Schillaci (2)	Iwata	2–0	Shimizu		Report
5	14 June 1997	K. Hasegawa	Shimizu	1–1	Iwata	T. Fujita	Report
6	1 July 1998		Iwata	0–3	Shimizu	Matsubara, Wada, Hiramatsu	Report
7	21 February 1999	Alex, unknown (o.g.)	Shimizu	2–0	Iwata		Report
8	7 July 1999		Shimizu	0–2	Iwata	Takahara (2)	Report
9	30 September 2000	unknown	Iwata	0–2	Shimizu	unknown	Report
10	6 June 2001	Baron, Sawanobori (2), K. Yamazaki	Shimizu	4–1	Iwata	Fukunishi	Report
11	25 June 2005		Shimizu	0–0	Iwata		Report
12	19 February 2006		Iwata	0–0	Shimizu		Report
13	21 February 2009	Hara, Okazaki	Shimizu	2–1	Iwata	Gilsinho	Report
14	9 April 2011	Hiraoka	Shimizu	1–1	Iwata	R. Yamazaki	Report
15	19 February 2012	unknown (o.g.)	Shimizu	1–0	Iwata		Report
16	16 February 2013	unknown	Iwata	0–1	Shimizu	unknown	Report
17	8 February 2015	Kitagawa	Shimizu	1–2	Iwata	Sakurauchi, Shimizu	Report
18	6 February 2016	K. Ogawa	Iwata	1–0	Shimizu		Report

== Goalscorers ==
As of 9 April 2025, competitive matches only

Rank	Player	Club	Goals
1	(Japan) Masashi Nakayama	Iwata	17
2	(Italy) Salvatore Schillaci	Iwata	11
3	(Japan) Ryoichi Maeda	Iwata	7
4	(Japan) Toshiya Fujita	Iwata	6
5	(South Korea) Cho Jae-jin	Shimizu	5
6	(Brazil) Adaílton	Iwata	4
6	(Brazil) Alex	Shimizu	4
6	(Brazil) Gral	Iwata	4
6	(Japan) Koya Kitagawa	Shimizu	4
6	(Japan) Genki Omae	Shimizu	4
6	(Japan) Masaaki Sawanobori	Shimizu	4
12	(Japan) Robert Cullen	Iwata	3
12	(Japan) Takuma Edamura	Shimizu	3
12	(Japan) Takashi Fukunishi	Iwata	3
12	(Japan) Teruyoshi Ito	Shimizu	3
12	(North Korea) Jong Tae-se	Shimizu	3
12	(Japan) Ryuzo Morioka	Shimizu	3
12	(Brazil) Thiago Santana	Shimizu	3
12	(Brazil) Toninho	Shimizu	3
12	(Japan) Ryohei Yamazaki	Iwata	3

== Players who played for both clubs ==
Player	Shimizu	Iwata
(Japan) Fumiaki Aoshima	1992–1995	1987–1991
(Japan) Ademir Santos	1992–1996	1987–1991
(Japan) Katsumi Oenoki	1992–2002	1988–1991
(Japan) Masao Sugimoto	1993–1996	1990–1992
(Japan) Masahiro Ando	1995–1999	1999–2000
(Japan) Yoshika Matsubara	1996	1994–1995, 1998
(Japan) Takuma Koga	2000–2002	1992–1999
(Japan) Kazumichi Takagi	2000–2004, 2005–2008	2016
(Japan) Yasumasa Nishino	2001–2005, 2006	2005
(Japan) Takahiro Yamanishi	2005–2008	1995–2004
(Japan) Naohiro Takahara	2011–2012	1998–2001, 2002
(Japan) Toshiyasu Takahara	2013	2003–2004
(Japan) Shota Kaneko	2014–2015, 2016–2021	2021–2024
(Japan) Ko Matsubara	2015–2019	2022–
