= 2010 Gamba Osaka season =

Gamba Osaka
2010 season
- Manager: Akira Nishino
- Stadium: Osaka Expo '70 Stadium
- J.League 1: Runners-up
- Emperor's Cup: Semi-finals
- J.League Cup: Quarter-finals
- Top goalscorer: Shoki Hirai (14)

2010 Gamba Osaka season

== Competitions ==
| Competitions | Position |
|---|---|
| J.League 1 | Runners-up / 18 clubs |
| Emperor's Cup | Semifinals |
| J.League Cup | Quarterfinals |

== Domestic results ==
=== J.League 1 ===
==== Table ====
| Pos | Team | Pld | W | D | L | GF | GA | GD | Pts | Qualification or relegation |
|---|---|---|---|---|---|---|---|---|---|---|
| 1 | Nagoya Grampus (C) | 34 | 23 | 3 | 8 | 54 | 37 | +17 | 72 | Qualification for 2011 AFC Champions League group stage (Note: Kashima Antlers qualified as 2010 Emperor's Cup winners.) |
| 2 | Gamba Osaka | 34 | 18 | 8 | 8 | 65 | 44 | +21 | 62 | Qualification for 2011 AFC Champions League group stage |
| 3 | Cerezo Osaka | 34 | 17 | 10 | 7 | 58 | 32 | +26 | 61 | Qualification for 2011 AFC Champions League group stage |
| 4 | Kashima Antlers | 34 | 16 | 12 | 6 | 51 | 31 | +20 | 60 | Qualification for 2011 AFC Champions League group stage |
| 5 | Kawasaki Frontale | 34 | 15 | 9 | 10 | 61 | 47 | +14 | 54 | |

Updated to match(es) played on December 4, 2010. Source: J.League Division 1
Rules for classification: 1) points; 2) goal difference; 3) number of goals scored.
(C) Champions

==== Results ====
| 6 March 2010 Round 1 | Gamba Osaka | 1–2 | Nagoya Grampus | Expo '70 Commemorative Stadium, Osaka |
| Saturday 21:00 | Futagawa 21', Severino (yellow card) 90' | Report | 14' Tamada, (yellow card) 65' Kanazaki, 69', (yellow card) 73' Kennedy | Attendance: 18,105; Referee: Okada |

| 14 March 2010 Round 2 | Cerezo Osaka | 1–1 | Gamba Osaka | Nagai Stadium, Osaka |
| Sunday 18:00 | Ferreira (yellow card) 61', (goal) 71' | Report | (yellow card) 45', (goal) 65' Myojin | Attendance: 37.860; Referee: Tojo |

| 20 March 2010 Round 3 | Gamba Osaka | 0–0 | Albirex Niigata | Expo '70 Commemorative Stadium, Osaka |
| Saturday 18:00 | Júnior (yellow card) 66', Yasude (yellow card) 74' | Report | | Attendance: 16,813; Referee: Ogiya |

| 28 March 2010 Round 4 | Gamba Osaka | 2–2 | Vegalta Sendai | Expo '70 Commemorative Stadium, Osaka |
| Sunday 19:00 | Endō 79' (pen.), Hirai 85', Yamaguchi (yellow card) 90' | Report | 54' (pen.), 90' (pen.) Ryang, (yellow card) 74' Watanabe, (yellow card) 79' Tomita | Attendance: 17,216; Referee: Toma |

| 4 April 2010 Round 5 | Júbilo Iwata | 4–3 | Gamba Osaka | Yamaha Stadium, Iwata |
| Sunday 15:00 | Maeda (yellow card) 26', (goal) 30', 54', Nishi (yellow card) 61', Park 75', 82' | Report | 36' Hashimoto, 74', 76' Hirai | Attendance: 10,603; Referee: Yoshida |

| 10 April 2010 Round 6 | Omiya Ardija | 1–3 | Gamba Osaka | NACK5 Stadium, Saitama |
| Saturday 15:00 | Fujita 8' | Report | (yellow card) 6' Kaji, 44', 49' Hirai, 52', (yellow card) 81' Myojin, (yellow card) 77' Takei | Attendance: 12,074; Referee: Tojo |

| 17 April 2010 Round 7 | Gamba Osaka | 1–1 | Shimizu S-Pulse | Expo '70 Commemorative Stadium, Osaka |
| Saturday 15:00 | Myojin 40' (pen.), Nakazawa (yellow card) 58', Cho (yellow card) 73' | Report | (yellow card) 40' Bosnar, (yellow card) 68' Honda, 70' Okazaki | Attendance: 19,914; Referee: Okada |

| 24 April 2010 Round 8 | Gamba Osaka | 2–0 | FC Tokyo | Expo '70 Commemorative Stadium |
| Saturday 18:00 | Takagi (yellow card) 17', Severino 66', Usami 75' | Report | Kim (yellow card) 90' | Attendance: 17,590; Referee: Sato |

| 1 May 2010 Round 9 | Kashima Antlers | 2–1 | Gamba Osaka | Kashima Soccer Stadium, Ibaraki |
| Saturday 17:00 | Ogasawara (yellow card) 27', Iwamasa 45', (yellow card) 54', Nozawa 68', Marquinhos (yellow card) 89' | Report | (yellow card) 75' Endō, 80' Hoshihara | Attendance: 32,855; Referee: Ogiya |

| 5 May 2010 Round 10 | Gamba Osaka | 4–4 | Kawasaki Frontale | Expo '70 Commemorative Stadium, Osaka |
| Wednesday 20:00 | Usami 33', Futagawa 59', Severino 63', Myojin 82' | Report | (yellow card) 25' Tasaka, 39' Mori, 74', 80', 90' Kusukami, (yellow card) 90' Terada | Attendance: 20,317; Referee: Toma |

| 14 May 2010 Round 11 | Gamba Osaka | 1–1 | Kyoto Sanga FC | Expo '70 Commemorative Stadium, Osaka |
| Wednesday 20:00 | Hirai 47', Usami (yellow card) 87' | Report | 62' Kakuda | Attendance: 9,093; Referee: Tojo |

| 16 May 2010 Round 12 | Shonan Bellmare | 1–3 | Gamba Osaka | Hiratsuka Stadium, Hiratsuka |
| Sunday 20:00 | Abe 11', Han (yellow card) 57' | Report | 41', 62' Hirai, (yellow card) 44' Kaji, 55' Severino, (yellow card) 90' Yamaguchi | Attendance: 13,797; Referee: Okabe |

| 18 July 2010 Round 13 | Gamba Osaka | 3–2 | Urawa Red Diamonds | Expo '70 Commemorative Stadium, Osaka |
| Sunday 19:00 | Kaji (yellow card) 7', Usami 45', Hashimoto (yellow card) 45', Yamada 64' (o.g.), Severino 68, Yasuhito Endō 90' | Report | 18', 90' Edmílson, 90 Yamada | Attendance: 20,201; Referee: Sato |

| 24 July 2010 Round 14 | Yokohama F. Marinos | 1–0 | Gamba Osaka | Nissan Stadium, Yokohama |
| Saturday 20:00 | Amano 90' | Report | (yellow card) 55' Nakazawa | Attendance: 39,005; Referee: Okada |

| 28 July Round 15 | Vissel Kobe | 1–3 | Gamba Osaka |
| | | Report |

| 1 August Round 16 | Gamba Osaka | 1–0 | Montedio Yamagata |
| | | Report |

| 7 August 2010 Round 17 | Sanfrecce Hiroshima | 0–2 | Gamba Osaka |
| | | Report |

| 14 August 2010 Round 18 | Vegalta Sendai | 1–3 | Gamba Osaka |
| | | Report |

| 17 August 2010 Round 19 | Gamba Osaka | 1–1 | Kashima Antlers |
| | | Report |

| 22 August 2010 Round 20 | Nagoya Grampus | 3–1 | Gamba Osaka |
| | | Report |

| 29 August 2010 Round 21 | Gamba Osaka | 2–0 | Júbilo Iwata |
| | | Report |

| 11 September 2010 Round 22 | Albirex Niigata | 1–2 | Gamba Osaka |
| | | Report |

| 18 September 2010 Round 23 | Gamba Osaka | 3–2 | Cerezo Osaka |
| | | Report |

| 25 September 2010 Round 24 | Kawasaki Frontale | 1–2 | Gamba Osaka |
| | | Report |

| 2 October 2010 Round 25 | Montedio Yamagata | 2–1 | Gamba Osaka |
| | | Report |

| 16 October 2010 Round 26 | Gamba Osaka | 5–1 | Omiya Ardija |
| | | Report |

| 24 October 2010 Round 27 | Kyoto Sanga FC | 1–2 | Gamba Osaka |
| | | Report |

| 30 October 2010 Round 28 | Gamba Osaka | 2–4 | Vissel Kobe |
| | | Report |

| 6 November 2010 Round 29 | FC Tokyo | 1–1 | Gamba Osaka |
| | | Report |

| 14 November 2010 Round 30 | Gamba Osaka | 2–0 | Sanfrecce Hiroshima |
| | | Report |

| 11 November 2010 Round 31 | Urawa Red Diamonds | 0–2 | Gamba Osaka |
| | | Report |

| 23 November 2010 Round 32 | Gamba Osaka | 2–1 | Shonan Bellmare |
| | | Report |

| 27 November 2010 Round 33 | Gamba Osaka | 0–2 | Yokohama F. Marinos |
| | | Report |

| 12 December 2010 Round 34 | Shimizu S-Pulse | 0–3 | Gamba Osaka |
| | | Report |

=== Emperor's Cup ===
| 5 September 2010 | Gamba Osaka | 6–2 | Osaka University of Health and Sport Sciences | Osaka Expo '70 Stadium, Suita |
| 18:00 | H. Sasaki 30'; Hirai 46'; Cho Jae-Jin 53', 55'; Dodo 79'; Shimohira 81' | Report | Mutsumi 86'; Kawanishi 89' | Attendance: 2,943; Referee: Tomohiro Inoue |

| 9 October 2010 | Gamba Osaka | 3–2 | Tochigi SC | Osaka Expo '70 Stadium, Suita |
| 13:00 | Lee Keun-Ho 53'; Hirai 83'; Otsuka 86' | Report | Takagi 13'; Funayama 38' | Attendance: 2,432; Referee: Yoshiro Imamura |

| 17 November 2010 | Gamba Osaka | 4–1 (a.e.t.) | Kashiwa Reysol | Osaka Expo '70 Stadium, Suita |
| 19:00 | H. Sasaki 81'; Yasuhito Endō 94' (pen.); Usami 114'; Lucas 119' | Report | Barada 50' | Attendance: 3,327; Referee: Kazuyuki Hayakawa |

| 25 December 2010 | Gamba Osaka | 2–1 (a.e.t.) | Urawa Red Diamonds | Osaka Expo '70 Stadium, Suita |
| 13:00 | Yasuhito Endō 72'; Usami 103' | Report | Ugajin 81' | Attendance: 14,815; Referee: Minoru Tōjō |

| 29 December 2010 | Shimizu S-Pulse | 3–0 | Gamba Osaka | Ecopa Stadium, Fukuroi |
| 13:00 | Johnsen 19', 61'; Hyodo 28' | Report | | Attendance: 14,179; Referee: Kenji Ogiya |

=== J.League Cup ===
| 1 September 2010 | Sanfrecce Hiroshima | 0–1 | Gamba Osaka | Hiroshima Big Arch, Hiroshima |
| 19:00 | | | Lucas 66' | Attendance: 6,731; Referee: Masayoshi Okada |

| 8 September 2010 | Gamba Osaka | 1–2 | Sanfrecce Hiroshima | Osaka Expo '70 Stadium, Suita |
| 19:00 | Dodo 82' | | Hisato Sato 26'; Koji Morisaki 56' | Attendance: 6,498; Referee: Minoru Tojo |

== International results ==
=== AFC Champions League ===
| 24 February 2010 | Suwon Samsung Bluewings (South Korea) | 0–0 | (Japan) Gamba Osaka | Suwon World Cup Stadium, Suwon |
| 19:30 (UTC+9) | | Report | | Attendance: 17,264; Referee: Matthew Breeze (Australia) |

| 10 March 2010 | Gamba Osaka (Japan) | 1–1 | (China) Henan Construction | Osaka Expo '70 Stadium, Suita |
| 19:00 (UTC+9) | Lucas 35' (pen.) | Report | Zhang Lu 3' | Attendance: 7,598; Referee: Ali Ahmad Madhad Saif Albadwawi (UAE) |

| 23 March 2010 | Singapore Armed Forces | 2–4 | (Japan) Gamba Osaka | Jalan Besar Stadium, Singapore |
| 19:30 (UTC+8) | Gunawan 32'; Sandberg 53' | Report | Hirai 6', 46', 83'; Nakazawa 71' | Attendance: 3,226; Referee: Abdulrahman Abdou (Qatar) |

| 31 March 2010 | Gamba Osaka (Japan) | 3–0 | Singapore Armed Forces | Osaka Expo '70 Stadium, Suita |
| 19:00 (UTC+9) | M. Yasuda 27'; Hirai 55'; Zé Carlos 90+2' | Report | | Attendance: 7,526; Referee: Valentin Kovalenko (Uzbekistan) |

| 13 April 2010 | Gamba Osaka (Japan) | 2–1 | (South Korea) Suwon Samsung Bluewings | Osaka Expo '70 Stadium, Suita |
| 19:00 (UTC+9) | Futagawa 61'; Usami 90' | Report | José Mota 58' | Attendance: 12,311; Referee: Masoud Moradi (Iran) |

| 27 April 2010 | Henan Construction (China) | 1–1 | (Japan) Gamba Osaka | Zhengzhou Hanghai Stadium, Zhengzhou |
| 20:00 (UTC+8) | Song Tae-Lim 90' | Report | Usami 39' | Attendance: 17,645; Referee: Abdullah Balideh (Qatar) |

| 11 May 2010 | Seongnam Ilhwa Chunma (South Korea) | 3–0 | (Japan) Gamba Osaka | Tancheon Sports Complex, Seongnam |
| 19:30 (UTC+9) | Molina 74' (pen.), 90'; Song Ho-Young 84' | Report | | Attendance: 9,368; Referee: Abdullah Al-Hilali (Oman) |

== Player statistics ==
| No. | Pos. | Player | D.o.B. (Age) | Height / Weight | J.League 1 | | Emperor's Cup | | J.League Cup | | Total | |
| No. | Pos. | Player | D.o.B. (Age) | Height / Weight | Apps | Goals | Apps | Goals | Apps | Goals | Apps | Goals |
|---|---|---|---|---|---|---|---|---|---|---|---|---|
| 1 | GK | Yosuke Fujigaya | February 13, 1981 (aged 29) | cm / kg | 34 | 0 | | | | | | |
| 2 | DF | Sota Nakazawa | October 26, 1982 (aged 27) | cm / kg | 32 | 4 | | | | | | |
| 4 | DF | Kazumichi Takagi | November 21, 1980 (aged 29) | cm / kg | 31 | 2 | | | | | | |
| 5 | DF | Satoshi Yamaguchi | April 17, 1978 (aged 31) | cm / kg | 18 | 0 | | | | | | |
| 6 | DF | Takumi Shimohira | October 6, 1988 (aged 21) | cm / kg | 6 | 0 | | | | | | |
| 7 | MF | Yasuhito Endō | January 28, 1980 (aged 30) | cm / kg | 30 | 3 | | | | | | |
| 8 | MF | Hayato Sasaki | November 29, 1982 (aged 27) | cm / kg | 26 | 3 | | | | | | |
| 9 | FW | Lucas Severino | January 3, 1979 (aged 31) | cm / kg | 19 | 7 | | | | | | |
| 10 | MF | Takahiro Futagawa | June 27, 1980 (aged 29) | cm / kg | 27 | 3 | | | | | | |
| 11 | FW | Pedro Júnior | January 29, 1987 (aged 23) | cm / kg | 2 | 0 | | | | | | |
| 13 | DF | Michihiro Yasuda | December 20, 1987 (aged 22) | cm / kg | 32 | 1 | | | | | | |
| 14 | FW | Shoki Hirai | December 4, 1987 (aged 22) | cm / kg | 30 | 14 | | | | | | |
| 15 | FW | Zé Carlos | April 24, 1983 (aged 26) | cm / kg | 1 | 0 | | | | | | |
| 16 | FW | Dodô | June 28, 1990 (aged 19) | cm / kg | 7 | 1 | | | | | | |
| 17 | MF | Tomokazu Myojin | January 24, 1978 (aged 32) | cm / kg | 29 | 4 | | | | | | |
| 18 | FW | Cho Jae-Jin | July 9, 1981 (aged 28) | cm / kg | 10 | 0 | | | | | | |
| 19 | GK | Kohei Kawata | October 13, 1987 (aged 22) | cm / kg | 0 | 0 | | | | | | |
| 21 | DF | Akira Kaji | January 13, 1980 (aged 30) | cm / kg | 32 | 0 | | | | | | |
| 22 | FW | Lee Keun-Ho | April 11, 1985 (aged 24) | cm / kg | 20 | 4 | | | | | | |
| 23 | MF | Takuya Takei | January 25, 1986 (aged 24) | cm / kg | 21 | 1 | | | | | | |
| 24 | FW | Kenta Hoshihara | May 1, 1988 (aged 21) | cm / kg | 6 | 1 | | | | | | |
| 25 | MF | Shigeru Yokotani | May 3, 1987 (aged 22) | cm / kg | 0 | 0 | | | | | | |
| 26 | GK | Yoichi Futori | August 3, 1982 (aged 27) | cm / kg | 0 | 0 | | | | | | |
| 27 | MF | Hideo Hashimoto | May 21, 1979 (aged 30) | cm / kg | 29 | 8 | | | | | | |
| 28 | DF | Shunya Suganuma | May 17, 1990 (aged 19) | cm / kg | 0 | 0 | | | | | | |
| 29 | GK | Atsushi Kimura | May 1, 1984 (aged 25) | cm / kg | 0 | 0 | | | | | | |
| 30 | DF | Tatsuya Uchida | February 8, 1992 (aged 18) | cm / kg | 0 | 0 | | | | | | |
| 31 | MF | Kodai Yasuda | August 8, 1989 (aged 20) | cm / kg | 0 | 0 | | | | | | |
| 32 | FW | Shohei Otsuka | April 11, 1990 (aged 19) | cm / kg | 4 | 0 | | | | | | |
| 33 | FW | Takashi Usami | May 6, 1992 (aged 17) | cm / kg | 26 | 7 | | | | | | |

== Other pages ==
- (in Japanese) J.League official site
