= Makoto Kakegawa =

Japanese footballer (born 1973)

Makoto Kakegawa 掛川 誠
Personal information
- Full name: Makoto Kakegawa
- Date of birth: May 23, 1973 (age 53)
- Place of birth: Kumagaya, Saitama, Japan
- Height: 1.91 m (6 ft 3 in)
- Position: Goalkeeper

Youth career
- 1989–1991: Yorii High School
- 1992–1995: Tokai University

Senior career*
Years	Team	Apps	(Gls)
1996–1999	Bellmare Hiratsuka	19	(0)
2000–2005	Vissel Kobe	128	(0)
2006–2009	Shimizu S-Pulse	0	(0)
Total		147	(0)
Medal record
Shimizu S-Pulse
Runner-up	J.League Cup	2008
- * Club domestic league appearances and goals

Makoto Kakegawa (掛川 誠, Kakegawa Makoto; born May 23, 1973) is a former Japanese football player.

== Playing career ==
Kakegawa was born in Kumagaya on May 23, 1973. After graduating from Tokai University, he joined the J1 League club Bellmare Hiratsuka in 1996. He did not play as often as teammate Nobuyuki Kojima. In 1997, he played 9 matches, when Kojima left the club for the Japan national team. Kojima was released from the club due to their financial problems at the end of the 1998 season. In 1999, Kakegawa competed with Seiji Honda for the position and played 10 matches. However, the club finished in last place and was relegated to the J2 League. In 2000, he moved to Vissel Kobe. In 2000, he did not play as often as Jiro Takeda. In 2001, he became a regular goalkeeper. However the club finished in last place in 2005 and was relegated to J2. In 2006, he moved to Shimizu S-Pulse. However, he again did not play often, less than Yohei Nishibe and Kaito Yamamoto. He retired at the end of the 2009 season.

== Club statistics ==
Club performance			League		Cup		League Cup		Total	
Season	Club	League	Apps	Goals	Apps	Goals	Apps	Goals	Apps	Goals
Japan			League		Emperor's Cup		J.League Cup		Total	
1996	Bellmare Hiratsuka	J1 League	0	0	0	0	0	0	0	0
1997	Bellmare Hiratsuka	J1 League	9	0	0	0	0	0	9	0
1998	Bellmare Hiratsuka	J1 League	0	0	0	0	4	0	4	0
1999	Bellmare Hiratsuka	J1 League	10	0	1	0	1	0	12	0
2000	Vissel Kobe	J1 League	2	0	4	0	2	0	8	0
2001	Vissel Kobe	J1 League	29	0	2	0	2	0	33	0
2002	Vissel Kobe	J1 League	30	0	1	0	5	0	36	0
2003	Vissel Kobe	J1 League	29	0	3	0	6	0	38	0
2004	Vissel Kobe	J1 League	17	0	1	0	5	0	23	0
2005	Vissel Kobe	J1 League	21	0	0	0	5	0	26	0
2006	Shimizu S-Pulse	J1 League	0	0	0	0	0	0	0	0
2007	Shimizu S-Pulse	J1 League	0	0	0	0	0	0	0	0
2008	Shimizu S-Pulse	J1 League	0	0	0	0	0	0	0	0
2009	Shimizu S-Pulse	J1 League	0	0	0	0	0	0	0	0
Career total			147	0	12	0	30	0	189	0
