= Jumpei Takaki =

Japanese footballer (born 1982)

Jumpei Takaki 高木 純平
Personal information
- Full name: Jumpei Takaki
- Date of birth: September 1, 1982 (age 44)
- Place of birth: Kumamoto, Japan
- Height: 1.70 m (5 ft 7 in)
- Position: Defender

Youth career
- 1998–2000: Shimizu S-Pulse

Senior career*
Years	Team	Apps	(Gls)
2001–2010	Shimizu S-Pulse	109	(3)
2010–2012	Consadole Sapporo	72	(4)
2013–2015	Shimizu S-Pulse	9	(0)
2015	Montedio Yamagata	12	(0)
2016–2017	Tokyo Verdy	24	(0)
Total		226	(7)
Medal record
Shimizu S-Pulse
Runner-up	J.League Cup	2008
Winner	Emperor's Cup	2001
Runner-up	Emperor's Cup	2005
Runner-up	Emperor's Cup	2010
- * Club domestic league appearances and goals

Jumpei Takaki (高木 純平, Takaki Jumpei; born September 1, 1982) is a former Japanese football player.

== Playing career ==
Takaki was born in Kumamoto on September 1, 1982. He joined J1 League club Shimizu S-Pulse from youth team in 2001. Although he could not become a regular player, he played many matches as mainly left side midfielder for a long time. The club won the champions 2001 Emperor's Cup and 2nd place 2005 Emperor's Cup and 2008 J.League Cup. In July 2010, he moved to J2 League club Consadole Sapporo. He became a regular player as left side midfielder and side back and the club was promoted to J1 from 2012. In 2013, he moved to his first club Shimizu S-Pulse. However he could hardly play in the match. In March 2015, he moved to J1 club Montedio Yamagata. Although he played as right side midfielder and side back, the club was relegated to J2 end of 2015 season. In 2016, he moved to J2 club Tokyo Verdy. He played many matches as right midfielder. However his opportunity to play decreased from summer 2016 and he retired end of 2017 season.

== Club statistics ==
Club performance			League		Cup		League Cup		Continental		Total	
Season	Club	League	Apps	Goals	Apps	Goals	Apps	Goals	Apps	Goals	Apps	Goals
Japan			League		Emperor's Cup		J.League Cup		Asia		Total	
2001	Shimizu S-Pulse	J1 League	0	0	1	0	0	0	-		1	0
2002	Shimizu S-Pulse	J1 League	10	1	0	0	1	0	-		11	1
2003	Shimizu S-Pulse	J1 League	9	0	0	0	0	0	1	0	10	0
2004	Shimizu S-Pulse	J1 League	18	0	1	0	4	0	-		23	0
2005	Shimizu S-Pulse	J1 League	13	0	3	0	6	0	-		22	0
2006	Shimizu S-Pulse	J1 League	26	2	3	1	3	0	-		32	3
2007	Shimizu S-Pulse	J1 League	11	0	0	0	4	0	-		15	0
2008	Shimizu S-Pulse	J1 League	5	0	3	0	3	0	-		11	0
2009	Shimizu S-Pulse	J1 League	12	0	1	0	6	1	-		19	1
2010	Shimizu S-Pulse	J1 League	5	0	0	0	1	0	-		6	0
2010	Consadole Sapporo	J2 League	19	1	2	1	-		-		21	2
2011	Consadole Sapporo	J2 League	36	1	0	0	-		-		36	1
2012	Consadole Sapporo	J1 League	17	2	1	0	1	0	-		19	2
2013	Shimizu S-Pulse	J1 League	7	0	0	0	3	0	-		10	0
2014	Shimizu S-Pulse	J1 League	2	0	1	0	1	0	-		4	0
2015	Shimizu S-Pulse	J1 League	0	0	0	0	0	0	-		0	0
2015	Montedio Yamagata	J1 League	12	0	1	0	2	0	-		15	0
2016	Tokyo Verdy	J2 League	21	0	1	0	-		-		22	0
2017	Tokyo Verdy	J2 League	3	0	1	0	-		-		4	0
Total			226	7	19	2	35	1	1	0	281	10
