= Tomokazu Myojin =

Japanese footballer (born 1978)

Tomokazu Myojin 明神 智和
Personal information
- Full name: Tomokazu Myojin
- Date of birth: 24 January 1978 (age 48)
- Place of birth: Kobe, Hyogo, Japan
- Height: 1.74 m (5 ft 9 in)
- Position: Midfielder

Team information
- Current team: Gamba Osaka (manager)

Youth career
- 1993–1995: Kashiwa Reysol

Senior career*
| Years | Team | Apps | (Gls) |
| 1996–2005 | Kashiwa Reysol | 252 | (12) |
| 2006–2015 | Gamba Osaka | 250 | (14) |
| 2016 | Nagoya Grampus | 15 | (0) |
| 2017–2019 | Nagano Parceiro | 38 | (0) |
| Total | | 538 | (26) |

International career
| 1997 | Japan U-20 | 5 | (0) |
| 2000 | Japan U-23 | 4 | (0) |
| 2000–2002 | Japan | 26 | (3) |

Managerial career
- 2025–2026: Gamba Osaka (assistant)
- 2026–: Gamba Osaka
Medal record
Men's football
Representing Japan
AFC Asian Cup
| Winner | 2000 Lebanon |
FIFA Confederations Cup
| Runner-up | 2001 Korea/Japan |
- * Club domestic league appearances and goals

Tomokazu Myojin (明神 智和, Myōjin Tomokazu; born 24 January 1978) is a Japanese former professional footballer who played as a midfielder. He played for the Japan national team. He is currently the manager of J1 League club Gamba Osaka.

== Club career ==
Myojin was born in Kobe on 24 January 1978. He joined J1 League club Kashiwa Reysol from youth team in 1996. He played many matches as defensive midfielder from first season. He became a regular player under manager Akira Nishino in 1998. In 1999, Reysol won the champions in J.League Cup and the 3rd place in J1 League. In 2000, Reysol won the 3rd place in J1 League for two years in a row and he was selected Best Eleven award. However the club results were sluggish from 2002 and was relegated to J2 League end of 2005 season.

In 2006, Myojin moved to Gamba Osaka which was managed by Akira Nishino. He played as regular player with many Japan national team player and Gamba won the many title, 2007 J.League Cup, 2008 and 2009 Emperor's Cup. In Asia, Gamba also won the champions in 2008 AFC Champions League and the 3rd place in 2008 Club World Cup. This is the golden era in the club history and he was one of the central player under manager Nishino. However manager Nishino left Gamba end of 2011 season and the club performance deteriorated soon. In 2012, Gamba finished at the 17th place of 18 clubs and was relegated to J2 League. Although his opportunity to play decreased from 2013, Gamba won the champions in 2013 J2 League and was returned to J1. In 2014, Gamba won all three major title in Japan, J1 League, J.League Cup and Emperor's Cup. He resigned end of 2015 season.

In 2016, Myojin moved to Nagoya Grampus. However he could not play many matches. Grampus also finished at the 16th place and was relegated to J2. In 2017, Myojin moved to J3 League club Nagano Parceiro; after three seasons, he opted to retire at the end of 2019.

== International career ==
In June 1997, Myojin was selected Japan U20 national team for 1997 World Youth Championship. At this tournament, he played full time in all 5 matches as defensive midfielder. In September 2000, he was selected Japan U23 national team for 2000 Summer Olympics. At this tournament, he played full time in all four matches as defensive midfielder with Junichi Inamoto.

He was capped 26 times and scored 3 goals for the Japan national team between 2000 and 2002. He played three games at the 2002 FIFA World Cup.

== Career statistics ==
=== Club ===
Appearances and goals by club, season and competition
| Club | Season | League | | | Emperor's Cup | | J.League Cup | | Asia | | Other (Note: Appearances in Japanese Super Cup and Suruga Bank Championship) | | Total | |
| Club | Season | Division | Apps | Goals | Apps | Goals | Apps | Goals | Apps | Goals | Apps | Goals | Apps | Goals |
|---|---|---|---|---|---|---|---|---|---|---|---|---|---|---|
| Kashiwa Reysol | 1996 | J1 League | 11 | 0 | 0 | 0 | 2 | 0 | – | | – | | 13 | 0 |
| Kashiwa Reysol | 1997 | J1 League | 13 | 1 | 1 | 0 | 6 | 0 | – | | – | | 20 | 1 |
| Kashiwa Reysol | 1998 | J1 League | 28 | 0 | 2 | 0 | 4 | 1 | – | | – | | 34 | 1 |
| Kashiwa Reysol | 1999 | J1 League | 30 | 1 | 3 | 0 | 4 | 0 | – | | – | | 37 | 1 |
| Kashiwa Reysol | 2000 | J1 League | 29 | 2 | 2 | 0 | 2 | 0 | – | | – | | 33 | 2 |
| Kashiwa Reysol | 2001 | J1 League | 29 | 0 | 1 | 0 | 4 | 0 | – | | – | | 34 | 0 |
| Kashiwa Reysol | 2002 | J1 League | 27 | 1 | 0 | 0 | 1 | 0 | – | | – | | 28 | 1 |
| Kashiwa Reysol | 2003 | J1 League | 29 | 1 | 2 | 1 | 4 | 0 | – | | – | | 35 | 2 |
| Kashiwa Reysol | 2004 | J1 League | 28 | 5 | 0 | 0 | 6 | 0 | – | | – | | 34 | 5 |
| Kashiwa Reysol | 2005 | J1 League | 28 | 1 | 1 | 0 | 4 | 0 | – | | – | | 33 | 1 |
| Kashiwa Reysol | Total | | 252 | 12 | 12 | 1 | 37 | 1 | – | | – | | 301 | 14 |
| Gamba Osaka | 2006 | J1 League | 25 | 0 | 5 | 0 | 2 | 0 | 3 | 0 | 1 | 0 | 36 | 0 |
| Gamba Osaka | 2007 | J1 League | 33 | 2 | 2 | 0 | 10 | 0 | – | | 1 | 0 | 46 | 2 |
| Gamba Osaka | 2008 | J1 League | 32 | 3 | 5 | 0 | 4 | 0 | 14 | 1 | 3 (Note: Appearances in FIFA Club World Cup) | 0 | 58 | 4 |
| Gamba Osaka | 2009 | J1 League | 31 | 2 | 5 | 2 | 2 | 1 | 5 | 0 | 1 | 0 | 44 | 5 |
| Gamba Osaka | 2010 | J1 League | 29 | 4 | 3 | 0 | 1 | 0 | 6 | 0 | – | | 39 | 4 |
| Gamba Osaka | 2011 | J1 League | 27 | 2 | 1 | 0 | 0 | 0 | 5 | 0 | – | | 33 | 2 |
| Gamba Osaka | 2012 | J1 League | 31 | 1 | 5 | 1 | 2 | 0 | 5 | 0 | – | | 43 | 2 |
| Gamba Osaka | 2013 | J2 League | 20 | 0 | 1 | 0 | 0 | 0 | 0 | 0 | – | | 21 | 0 |
| Gamba Osaka | 2014 | J1 League | 12 | 0 | 4 | 0 | 5 | 0 | – | | – | | 21 | 0 |
| Gamba Osaka | 2015 | J1 League | 10 | 0 | 1 | 0 | 3 | 0 | 4 | 0 | 2 | 0 | 20 | 0 |
| Gamba Osaka | Total | | 250 | 14 | 32 | 3 | 29 | 1 | 42 | 1 | 8 | 0 | 361 | 19 |
| Nagoya Grampus | 2016 | J1 League | 15 | 0 | 0 | 0 | 3 | 0 | – | | – | | 18 | 0 |
| Nagano Parceiro | 2017 | J3 League | 16 | 0 | 1 | 0 | – | | – | | – | | 17 | 0 |
| Nagano Parceiro | 2018 | J3 League | 14 | 0 | 0 | 0 | – | | – | | – | | 14 | 0 |
| Nagano Parceiro | 2019 | J3 League | 8 | 0 | 2 | 0 | – | | – | | – | | 10 | 0 |
| Nagano Parceiro | Total | | 38 | 0 | 3 | 0 | – | | – | | – | | 41 | 0 |
| Career total | | | 538 | 26 | 47 | 4 | 69 | 2 | 42 | 1 | 7 | 0 | 703 | 33 |

=== International ===
Appearances and goals by national team and year
| National team | Year | Apps | Goals |
|---|---|---|---|
| Japan | 2000 | 9 | 2 |
| Japan | 2001 | 7 | 0 |
| Japan | 2002 | 10 | 1 |
| Total | | 26 | 3 |

Scores and results list Japan's goal tally first, score column indicates score after each Myojin goal.

List of international goals scored by Tomokazu Myojin
| No. | Date | Venue | Opponent | Score | Result | Competition |
|---|---|---|---|---|---|---|
| 1 | 24 October 2000 | Beirut, Lebanon | Iraq | 4–1 | 4–1 | 2000 AFC Asian Cup |
| 2 | 26 October 2000 | Beirut, Lebanon | China | 3–2 | 3–2 | 2000 AFC Asian Cup |
| 3 | 17 April 2002 | Yokohama, Japan | Costa Rica | 1–0 | 1–1 | Friendly |

== Managerial career ==
On 18 July 2026, Myojin was appointed the manager of Gamba Osaka, after Jens Wissing departed for Al-Ittihad.

== Managerial statistics ==
As of match played 4 November 2026

Managerial record by team and tenure
| Team | Nat. | From | To | Record | | | | | | | | Ref. |
| Team | Nat. | From | To | G | W | D | L | GF | GA | GD | Win % | Ref. |
|---|---|---|---|---|---|---|---|---|---|---|---|---|
| Gamba Osaka | (Japan) | 18 July 2026 | Present | 21 | 7 | 8 | 6 | 37 | 32 | +5 | 33.33 | |
| Career Total | | | | 21 | 7 | 8 | 6 | 37 | 32 | +5 | 33.33 | |

== Honours ==
Kashiwa Reysol

- J.League Cup – 1999

Gamba Osaka

- AFC Champions League – 2008
- Pan-Pacific Championship – 2008
- J1 League – 2014
- Emperor's Cup – 2008, 2009, 2014, 2015
- J.League Cup – 2007
- Japanese Super Cup – 2007, 2015

Japan

- AFC Asian Cup – 2000

Individual

- J.League Best Eleven – 2000
