= 2015 Montedio Yamagata season =

Montedio Yamagata
2015 season
- Manager: Nobuhiro Ishizaki
- Stadium: ND Soft Stadium Yamagata
- J1 League: 18th

2015 Montedio Yamagata season.

== J1 League ==
=== League table ===
Pos	Team	Pld	W	D	L	GF	GA	GD	Pts	Qualification or relegation
16	Matsumoto Yamaga (R)	34	7	7	20	30	54	−24	28	Relegation to 2016 J2 League
17	Shimizu S-Pulse (R)	34	5	10	19	37	65	−28	25	Relegation to 2016 J2 League
18	Montedio Yamagata (R)	34	4	12	18	24	53	−29	24	Relegation to 2016 J2 League

Updated to match(es) played on 28 November 2015. Source: Meiji Yasuda J1 League Standings
Rules for classification: 1) Points; 2) Goal difference; 3) Goals scored
(R) Relegated

=== Match details ===
J1 League match details
Match	Date	Team	Score	Team	Venue	Attendance
1-1	2015.03.07	Vegalta Sendai	2-0	Montedio Yamagata	Yurtec Stadium Sendai	19,375
1-2	2015.03.14	Urawa Reds	1-0	Montedio Yamagata	Saitama Stadium 2002	40,802
1-3	2015.03.22	Montedio Yamagata	1-0	Kawasaki Frontale	ND Soft Stadium Yamagata	12,081
1-4	2015.04.04	Montedio Yamagata	1-2	Shonan Bellmare	ND Soft Stadium Yamagata	7,321
1-5	2015.04.12	Sagan Tosu	1-0	Montedio Yamagata	Best Amenity Stadium	8,852
1-6	2015.04.18	Montedio Yamagata	0-0	Matsumoto Yamaga FC	ND Soft Stadium Yamagata	7,067
1-7	2015.04.25	Montedio Yamagata	0-1	FC Tokyo	ND Soft Stadium Yamagata	11,524
1-8	2015.04.29	Shimizu S-Pulse	3-3	Montedio Yamagata	IAI Stadium Nihondaira	11,348
1-9	2015.05.02	Montedio Yamagata	1-0	Yokohama F. Marinos	ND Soft Stadium Yamagata	12,188
1-10	2015.05.06	Albirex Niigata	1-1	Montedio Yamagata	Denka Big Swan Stadium	25,009
1-11	2015.05.10	Montedio Yamagata	3-0	Kashiwa Reysol	ND Soft Stadium Yamagata	8,285
1-12	2015.05.16	Ventforet Kofu	2-0	Montedio Yamagata	Yamanashi Chuo Bank Stadium	9,159
1-13	2015.05.23	Montedio Yamagata	0-1	Vissel Kobe	ND Soft Stadium Yamagata	7,894
1-14	2015.05.30	Nagoya Grampus	0-0	Montedio Yamagata	Toyota Stadium	13,662
1-15	2015.06.07	Montedio Yamagata	2-2	Kashima Antlers	ND Soft Stadium Yamagata	13,241
1-16	2015.06.20	Sanfrecce Hiroshima	5-1	Montedio Yamagata	Edion Stadium Hiroshima	12,286
1-17	2015.06.27	Montedio Yamagata	1-3	Gamba Osaka	ND Soft Stadium Yamagata	14,320
2-1	2015.07.11	Yokohama F. Marinos	1-1	Montedio Yamagata	Nissan Stadium	20,575
2-2	2015.07.15	Montedio Yamagata	0-0	Urawa Reds	ND Soft Stadium Yamagata	10,849
2-3	2015.07.19	FC Tokyo	0-0	Montedio Yamagata	Ajinomoto Stadium	22,175
2-4	2015.07.25	Montedio Yamagata	1-3	Albirex Niigata	ND Soft Stadium Yamagata	11,206
2-5	2015.07.29	Montedio Yamagata	0-3	Nagoya Grampus	ND Soft Stadium Yamagata	6,100
2-6	2015.08.12	Kawasaki Frontale	0-0	Montedio Yamagata	Kawasaki Todoroki Stadium	19,154
2-7	2015.08.16	Montedio Yamagata	1-3	Sagan Tosu	ND Soft Stadium Yamagata	10,096
2-8	2015.08.22	Kashima Antlers	3-0	Montedio Yamagata	Kashima Soccer Stadium	16,700
2-10	2015.09.12	Montedio Yamagata	1-3	Sanfrecce Hiroshima	ND Soft Stadium Yamagata	8,137
2-11	2015.09.20	Kashiwa Reysol	0-0	Montedio Yamagata	Hitachi Kashiwa Stadium	10,520
2-9	2015.09.23	Matsumoto Yamaga FC	2-2	Montedio Yamagata	Matsumotodaira Park Stadium	15,412
2-12	2015.09.26	Montedio Yamagata	1-1	Vegalta Sendai	ND Soft Stadium Yamagata	13,737
2-13	2015.10.03	Shonan Bellmare	0-1	Montedio Yamagata	Shonan BMW Stadium Hiratsuka	10,254
2-14	2015.10.17	Montedio Yamagata	0-1	Ventforet Kofu	ND Soft Stadium Yamagata	8,191
2-15	2015.10.24	Vissel Kobe	3-1	Montedio Yamagata	Noevir Stadium Kobe	11,508
2-16	2015.11.07	Montedio Yamagata	1-2	Shimizu S-Pulse	ND Soft Stadium Yamagata	8,281
2-17	2015.11.22	Gamba Osaka	4-0	Montedio Yamagata	Expo '70 Commemorative Stadium	18,219
