= Arata Kodama =

Japanese footballer

Arata Kodama 児玉 新
Personal information
- Date of birth: October 8, 1982 (age 44)
- Place of birth: Takatsuki, Osaka, Japan
- Height: 1.78 m (5 ft 10 in)
- Position: Defender

Youth career
- 1998–2000: Gamba Osaka

Senior career*
Years	Team	Apps	(Gls)
2001–2005	Gamba Osaka	25	(0)
2006	Kyoto Purple Sanga	31	(0)
2007–2011	Shimizu S-Pulse	106	(1)
2012	Cerezo Osaka	3	(0)
2013	Oita Trinita	11	(0)
Total		176	(1)
Medal record
Gamba Osaka
Winner	J1 League	2005
Runner-up	J.League Cup	2005
Shimizu S-Pulse
Runner-up	J.League Cup	2008
Runner-up	Emperor's Cup	2010
- * Club domestic league appearances and goals

Arata Kodama (児玉 新, Kodama Arata; born October 8, 1982) is a former Japanese football player and manager. He is the currently an assistant manager of Gamba Osaka.

== Playing career ==
Kodama was born in Takatsuki on October 8, 1982. He joined J1 League club Gamba Osaka from youth team in 2001. Although he played as left side midfielder, he could not become a regular player. In 2006, he moved to J1 club Kyoto Purple Sanga. He became a regular player as left side back. However the club finished at the bottom place and was relegated to J2 League end of 2006 season. In 2007, he moved to J1 club Shimizu S-Pulse. He played many matches as regular left side back and the club won the 2nd place 2008 J.League Cup. In 2009, the club gained new player Kosuke Ota and Kodama also played as center back not only side back. However his opportunity to play decreased from 2010. In 2012, he moved to J1 club Cerezo Osaka. However he could hardly play in the match. In 2013, he moved to J1 club Oita Trinita. Although he played many matches until summer 2013, his opportunity to play decreased from summer and the club finished at the bottom place. He retired end of 2013 season.

== Club statistics ==
Club performance			League		Cup		League Cup		Total	
Season	Club	League	Apps	Goals	Apps	Goals	Apps	Goals	Apps	Goals
Japan			League		Emperor's Cup		J.League Cup		Total	
2001	Gamba Osaka	J1 League	0	0	0	0	0	0	0	0
2002	Gamba Osaka	J1 League	0	0	1	0	0	0	1	0
2003	Gamba Osaka	J1 League	9	0	0	0	1	0	10	0
2004	Gamba Osaka	J1 League	13	0	4	0	4	0	21	0
2005	Gamba Osaka	J1 League	3	0	0	0	7	0	10	0
2006	Kyoto Purple Sanga	J1 League	31	0	0	0	4	0	35	0
2007	Shimizu S-Pulse	J1 League	33	0	3	0	6	0	42	0
2008	Shimizu S-Pulse	J1 League	26	0	3	0	5	0	34	0
2009	Shimizu S-Pulse	J1 League	30	1	5	1	9	0	44	2
2010	Shimizu S-Pulse	J1 League	15	0	2	0	5	0	22	0
2011	Shimizu S-Pulse	J1 League	2	0	0	0	0	0	2	0
2012	Cerezo Osaka	J1 League	3	0	1	0	0	0	4	0
2013	Oita Trinita	J1 League	11	0	2	0	4	0	17	0
Career total			176	1	21	1	45	0	242	2
