= Zeze High School =

Senior high school in Japan

Shiga Prefectural Zeze High School
- 滋賀県立膳所高等学校

Location
- 2-11-1 Zeze, Ōtsu, Shiga, 520-0815, Japan; Ōtsu, Shiga; Japan
- Coordinates: 34°59′47″N 135°53′26″E

Information
- Motto: 遵義・力行
- Established: 1898
- Campus: City
- Website: www.zeze-h.shiga-ec.ed.jp

Shiga Prefectural Zeze High School (滋賀県立膳所高等学校) is a senior high school situated in Ōtsu, Shiga, Japan, within walking distance of Lake Biwa. The school has about 1300 students. Founded in 1898, its root dates back to a major samurai training school of the area. The school's motto is 'Jyungi-Ryokkou' (遵義・力行), i.e. 'travel an honorable path and industriously devote yourself to achieve individual aspiration'. In line with its motto, the school excels in academics, and most students pursue higher education in university after their graduation. The students also excel at sports including judo, rowing, rugby, basketball and soccer and have participated in national competitions.

The Ministry of Education, Culture, Sports, Science and Technology appointed the school as a 'Super Science High School', an institution prioritizing science, technology, and mathematics.

== Reconstruction ==
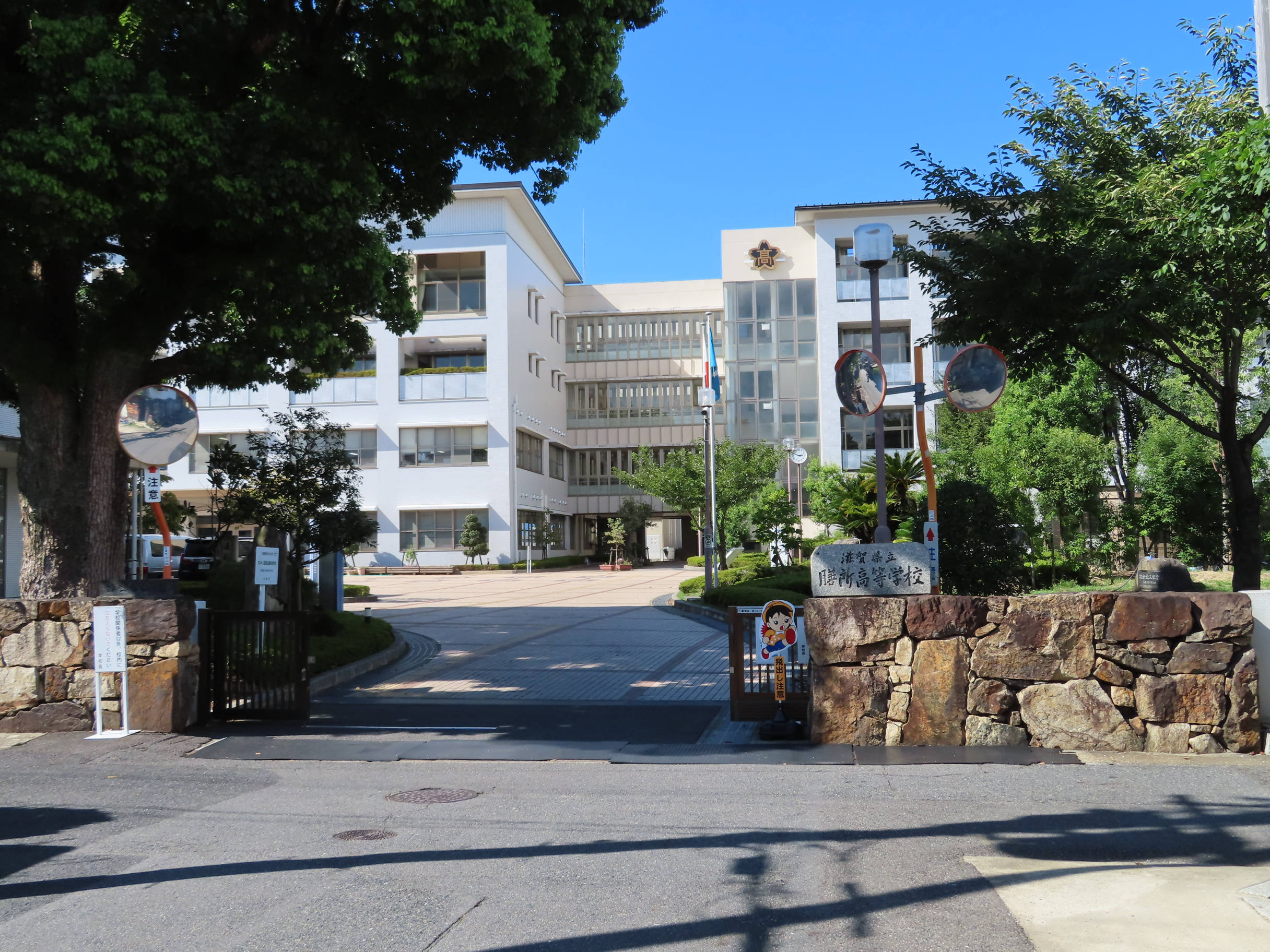

In 2006, new buildings replaced the old ones built over 45 years ago, since the old buildings did not satisfy the safety standard against earthquakes. To prevent the disruption of normal academic activities, the new buildings were constructed on the old school field. The old buildings will be demolished and the site converted to a new field.
