= Takuro Yajima =

Japanese footballer (born 1984)

Takuro Yajima 矢島 卓郎
Personal information
- Full name: Takuro Yajima
- Date of birth: March 28, 1984 (age 42)
- Place of birth: Otsu, Japan
- Height: 1.82 m (5 ft 11 1/2 in)
- Position: Forward

Youth career
- 1999–2001: Zeze High School
- 2002–2005: Waseda University

Senior career*
Years	Team	Apps	(Gls)
2004	Kawasaki Frontale	1	(0)
2006–2008	Shimizu S-Pulse	69	(15)
2009–2013	Kawasaki Frontale	93	(23)
2014–2015	Yokohama F. Marinos	14	(0)
2016	Kyoto Sanga FC	12	(1)
Total		189	(39)
Medal record
Kawasaki Frontale
Runner-up	J1 League	2009
Runner-up	J.League Cup	2009
Shimizu S-Pulse
Runner-up	J.League Cup	2008
- * Club domestic league appearances and goals

Takuro Yajima (矢島 卓郎, Yajima Takuro; born 28 March 1984) is a former Japanese football player.

== Playing career ==
Yajima first joined then J2 team Kawasaki Frontale. He only made one start for Kawasaki before signing for S-Pulse for the 2006 season where he's been a regular partner for striker Cho Jae-Jin. Yajima's first J.League goal came against Gamba Osaka in April 2006. In January 2009, he transferred back to Kawasaki Frontale.

== Club statistics ==
Club performance			League		Cup		League Cup		Continental		Total	
Season	Club	League	Apps	Goals	Apps	Goals	Apps	Goals	Apps	Goals	Apps	Goals
Japan			League		Emperor's Cup		J.League Cup		Asia		Total	
2004	Kawasaki Frontale	J2 League	1	0	0	0	-		-		1	0
2006	Shimizu S-Pulse	J1 League	19	3	3	4	5	1	-		27	8
2007	Shimizu S-Pulse	J1 League	26	7	3	0	5	0	-		34	7
2008	Shimizu S-Pulse	J1 League	24	5	3	0	6	1	-		33	6
2009	Kawasaki Frontale	J1 League	14	2	2	2	1	0	1	0	18	4
2010	Kawasaki Frontale	J1 League	12	4	2	0	2	0	2	0	18	4
2011	Kawasaki Frontale	J1 League	30	7	2	1	3	0	-		35	8
2012	Kawasaki Frontale	J1 League	20	7	1	0	6	1	-		27	8
2013	Kawasaki Frontale	J1 League	17	3	3	1	7	2	-		27	6
2014	Yokohama F. Marinos	J1 League	9	0	1	0	1	0	2	0	13	0
2015	Yokohama F. Marinos	J1 League	5	0	1	0	2	0	-		8	0
2016	Kyoto Sanga FC	J2 League	0	0	0	0	-		-		0	0
Total			177	38	21	8	38	5	5	0	241	51
