= Yohei Nishibe =

Japanese footballer

Yohei Nishibe 西部 洋平
Personal information
- Date of birth: 1 December 1980 (age 45)
- Place of birth: Kobe, Hyogo, Japan
- Height: 1.87 m (6 ft 1 1/2 in)
- Position: Goalkeeper

Team information
- Current team: Shimizu S-Pulse
- Number: 1

Youth career
- 1996–1998: Teikyo Daisan High School

Senior career*
Years	Team	Apps	(Gls)
1999–2003	Urawa Reds	33	(0)
2003	Kashima Antlers	0	(0)
2004–2010	Shimizu S-Pulse	190	(0)
2011	Shonan Bellmare	38	(0)
2012–2015	Kawasaki Frontale	82	(0)
2016–2020	Shimizu S-Pulse	21	(0)
2021–2022	Kataller Toyama	31	(0)
Medal record
Urawa Reds
Winner	J.League Cup	2003
Runner-up	J.League Cup	2002
Kashima Antlers
Runner-up	J.League Cup	2003
Shimizu S-Pulse
Runner-up	J.League Cup	2008
Runner-up	Emperor's Cup	2005
Runner-up	Emperor's Cup	2010
- * Club domestic league appearances and goals

Yohei Nishibe (西部 洋平, Nishibe Yohei; born 1 December 1980) is a Japanese former football player.

== Playing career ==
Nishibe was born in Kobe on 1 December 1980. After graduating from high school, he joined the J1 League club Urawa Reds in 1999. Reds were relegated to the J2 League from 2000. Although he debuted against Kawasaki Frontale in the 2000 J.League Cup on April 12, Reds lost 0–3. He debuted in the J2 League on October 7 and played all the last 7 matches in the 2000 season after his debut. Reds also won the 2nd place and returned to J1 in 2001. In 2001, he battled with Tomoyasu Ando for the position and played many matches. However, he could not play in the match behind Norihiro Yamagishi from the summer of 2002.

In June 2003, Nishibe moved to Kashima Antlers. However, he could not play in the match behind Hitoshi Sogahata.

In 2004, Nisihbe moved to Shimizu S-Pulse. He became a regular goalkeeper and played many matches for a long time. S-Pulse won 2nd place in the 2005 Emperor's Cup, the 2008 J.League Cup, and the 2010 Emperor's Cup.

In 2011, Nishibe moved to a newly relegated J2 club, Shonan Bellmare. Although he played as a regular goalkeeper, the club's results were bad and finished in 14th place.

In 2012, Nishibe moved to the J1 club Kawasaki Frontale. He battled with Rikihiro Sugiyama for the position and played many matches until 2014. However, his opportunity to play decreased behind Shota Arai in 2015.

In 2016, Nishibe rejoined the newly relegated to J2 club, Shimizu S-Pulse, for the first time in 6 years.

== Club statistics ==
As of end of 2018 season

Club performance			League		Cup		League Cup		Continental		Total	
Season	Club	League	Apps	Goals	Apps	Goals	Apps	Goals	Apps	Goals	Apps	Goals
Japan			League		Emperor's Cup		J. League Cup		AFC		Total	
1999	Urawa Reds	J1 League	0	0	0	0	0	0	-		0	0
2000	Urawa Reds	J2 League	7	0	2	0	1	0	-		10	0
2001	Urawa Reds	J1 League	21	0	4	0	2	0	-		27	0
2002	Urawa Reds	J1 League	5	0	0	0	6	0	-		11	0
2003	Urawa Reds	J1 League	0	0	0	0	0	0	-		0	0
Total			33	0	6	0	9	0	-		48	0
2003	Kashima Antlers	J1 League	0	0	0	0	0	0	-		0	0
Total			0	0	0	0	0	0	-		0	0
2004	Shimizu S-Pulse	J1 League	27	0	0	0	6	0	-		33	0
2005	Shimizu S-Pulse	J1 League	29	0	5	0	7	0	-		41	0
2006	Shimizu S-Pulse	J1 League	34	0	3	0	4	0	-		41	0
2007	Shimizu S-Pulse	J1 League	33	0	2	0	4	0	-		39	0
2008	Shimizu S-Pulse	J1 League	21	0	2	0	8	0	-		31	0
2009	Shimizu S-Pulse	J1 League	14	0	4	0	2	0	-		20	0
2010	Shimizu S-Pulse	J1 League	32	0	2	0	8	0	-		42	0
Total			190	0	18	0	39	0	-		247	0
2011	Shonan Bellmare	J2 League	38	0	0	0	-		-		38	0
Total			38	0	0	0	-		-		38	0
2012	Kawasaki Frontale	J1 League	28	0	0	0	3	0	-		31	0
2013	Kawasaki Frontale	J1 League	23	0	2	0	3	0	–		28	0
2014	Kawasaki Frontale	J1 League	20	0	1	0	1	0	8	0	30	0
2015	Kawasaki Frontale	J1 League	11	0	2	0	3	0	–		16	0
Total			82	0	5	0	10	0	8	0	105	0
2016	Shimizu S-Pulse	J2 League	6	0	0	0	–		–		6	0
2017	Shimizu S-Pulse	J1 League	0	0	0	0	0	0	–		0	0
2018	Shimizu S-Pulse	J1 League	0	0	2	0	6	0	–		8	0
2019	Shimizu S-Pulse	J1 League							–			
Total			6	0	2	0	6	0	-		14	0
Career total			349	0	31	0	64	0	8	0	452	0
