= Takuya Honda =

Japanese footballer

Personal information
- Date of birth: 17 April 1985 (age 41)
- Place of birth: Sagamihara, Kanagawa, Japan
- Height: 1.77 m (5 ft 10 in)
- Position: Midfielder

Youth career
- 2001–2003: Toko Gakuen High School

College career
Years	Team	Apps	(Gls)
2004–2007	Hosei University		

Senior career*
Years	Team	Apps	(Gls)
2008–2010	Shimizu S-Pulse	65	(2)
2011–2013	Kashima Antlers	18	(0)
2013–2016	Shimizu S-Pulse	81	(2)
2017–2020	Montedio Yamagata	121	(1)
2021–2022	FC Gifu	31	(0)

International career
2008	Japan U-23	2	(0)
2011	Japan	2	(0)
Medal record
Shimizu S-Pulse
Runner-up	J.League Cup	2008
Runner-up	Emperor's Cup	2010
Kashima Antlers
Winner	J.League Cup	2011
Winner	J.League Cup	2012
Representing Japan
AFC Asian Cup
Gold medal – first place	2011 Qatar
- * Club domestic league appearances and goals

Takuya Honda (本田 拓也, Honda Takuya; born 17 April 1985) is a Japanese former football.

== Club career ==
After graduating from Hosei University he joined S-Pulse in 2008.

== National team career ==
In August 2008, Honda was elected Japan U-23 national team for 2008 Summer Olympics. At this tournament, he played 2 matches as defensive midfielder.

== Club statistics ==
Updated to end of 2018 season.

Club performance			League		Cup		League Cup		Continental		Total	
Season	Club	League	Apps	Goals	Apps	Goals	Apps	Goals	Apps	Goals	Apps	Goals
Japan			League		Emperor's Cup		League Cup		AFC		Total	
2008	Shimizu S-Pulse	J1 League	16	1	1	0	6	0	-		23	1
2009	Shimizu S-Pulse	J1 League	18	0	5	0	6	0	-		29	0
2010	Shimizu S-Pulse	J1 League	31	1	4	0	7	0	-		42	1
2011	Kashima Antlers	J1 League	3	0	0	0	0	0	1	0	4	0
2012	Kashima Antlers	J1 League	8	0	3	0	4	0	–		15	0
2013	Kashima Antlers	J1 League	7	0	–		3	0	–		10	0
2013	Shimizu S-Pulse	J1 League	15	0	3	0	–		–		18	0
2014	Shimizu S-Pulse	J1 League	24	1	4	0	1	0	–		29	1
2015	Shimizu S-Pulse	J1 League	23	1	0	0	2	0	–		25	1
2016	Shimizu S-Pulse	J2 League	19	0	2	0	–		–		21	0
2017	Montedio Yamagata	J2 League	36	0	1	0	–		–		37	0
2018	Montedio Yamagata	J2 League	28	0	1	0	–		–		29	0
Career total			228	4	24	0	29	0	1	0	282	4

== National team statistics ==
Japan national team
Year	Apps	Goals
2011	2	0
Total	2	0
