= Masaki Yamamoto =

Japanese footballer

Masaki Yamamoto 山本 真希
Personal information
- Full name: Masaki Yamamoto
- Date of birth: 24 August 1987 (age 39)
- Place of birth: Shimada, Shizuoka, Japan
- Height: 1.76 m (5 ft 9 in)
- Position: Midfielder

Team information
- Current team: Matsumoto Yamaga
- Number: 26

Youth career
- 2000–2005: Shimizu S-Pulse

Senior career*
Years	Team	Apps	(Gls)
2005–2011	Shimizu S-Pulse	74	(5)
2012	Consadole Sapporo	25	(3)
2013–2015	Kawasaki Frontale	59	(3)
2016–2019	JEF United Chiba	64	(5)
2019	→ Matsumoto Yamaga (loan)	2	(0)
2020–	JEF United Chiba	11	(0)
Medal record
Shimizu S-Pulse
Runner-up	J.League Cup	2008
Runner-up	Emperor's Cup	2005
Runner-up	Emperor's Cup	2010
Representing Japan
AFC U-19 Championship
Silver medal – second place	2006 India
- * Club domestic league appearances and goals as of 19:11, 6 January 2021 (UTC)

Masaki Yamamoto (山本 真希, Yamamoto Masaki; born 24 August 1987 in Shizuoka prefecture) is a Japanese football player currently playing for J1 League team Matsumoto Yamaga FC.

== Career ==
Having worked his way through the Shimizu S-Pulse youth system, he signed full professional terms at the start of the 2006 season. Yamamoto has represented his country at several levels up to an including Under 20, although has yet to break into the full national team.

== Club statistics ==
Updated to 7 January 2019.

Appearances and goals by club, season and competition
Club	Season	League			Emperor's Cup		J.League Cup		Asia		Total	
Club	Season	Division	Apps	Goals	Apps	Goals	Apps	Goals	Apps	Goals	Apps	Goals
Shimizu S-Pulse	2005	J1 League	4	0	0	0	3	0	-		7	0
Shimizu S-Pulse	2006	J1 League	1	0	0	0	0	0	-		1	0
Shimizu S-Pulse	2007	J1 League	0	0	0	0	1	0	-		1	0
Shimizu S-Pulse	2008	J1 League	11	2	2	1	7	1	-		20	4
Shimizu S-Pulse	2009	J1 League	24	1	3	0	6	1	-		33	2
Shimizu S-Pulse	2010	J1 League	20	2	5	0	8	0	-		33	2
Shimizu S-Pulse	2011	J1 League	14	0	1	1	2	0	-		17	1
Consadole Sapporo	2012	J1 League	25	3	1	0	2	0	-		28	3
Kawasaki Frontale	2013	J1 League	33	2	4	0	9	0	-		46	2
Kawasaki Frontale	2014	J1 League	19	1	1	0	4	0	6	0	30	1
Kawasaki Frontale	2015	J1 League	7	0	0	0	0	0	-		7	0
JEF United Chiba	2016	J2 League	23	1	0	0	-		-		23	1
JEF United Chiba	2017	J2 League	23	3	0	0	-		-		23	3
JEF United Chiba	2018	J2 League	13	1	0	0	-		-		13	1
Career total			217	16	17	2	42	2	6	0	282	20
