= IAI Stadium Nihondaira =

Football stadium in Shimizu-ku, Shizuoka, Japan

- I Sta 'Daira
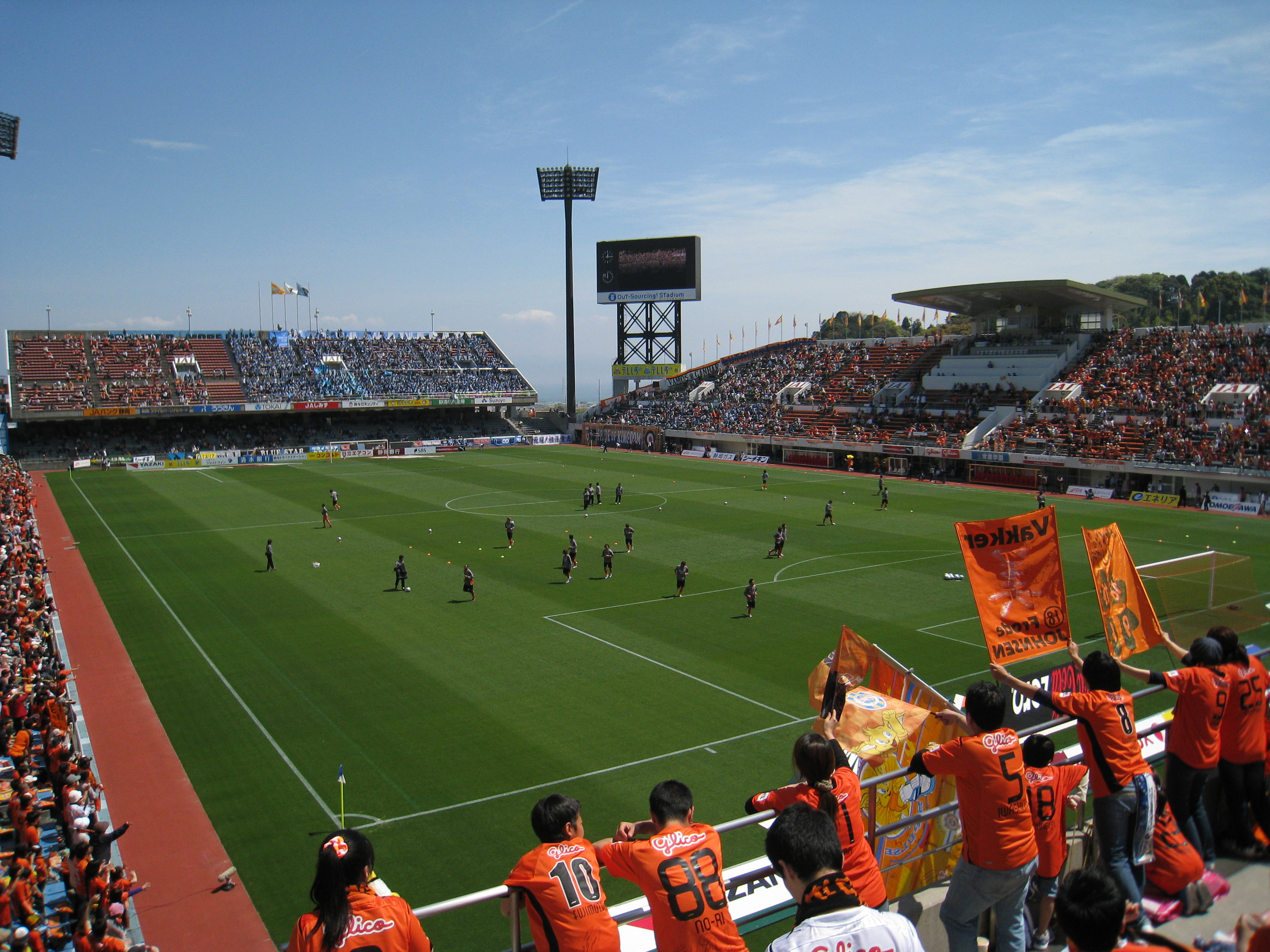
- Interactive map of IAI Stadium Nihondaira
- Former names: Nihondaira Sports Stadium (1991–2009); Outsourcing Stadium Nihondaira (2009–2013)
- Location: Shizuoka, Shizuoka, Japan
- Coordinates: 34°59′04″N 138°28′52″E
- Owner: Shizuoka City
- Operator: Shizuoka City Public Facility Corporation
- Capacity: 20,248
- Surface: Grass
- Field size: 135 m × 73 m

Construction
- Opened: 1991
- Expanded: 1994

Tenant
- Shimizu S-Pulse

IAI Stadium Nihondaira (IAIスタジアム日本平) (pronounced as I-A-I) is a football stadium in Shimizu-ku, Shizuoka, Japan. It is currently mostly used for football matches and has been the home stadium of the J-League's Shimizu S-Pulse since 1992. The stadium holds 20,248 people and was opened in 1991. In November 2008 a four-year naming deal effective from March 2009 was announced expected to earn S-Pulse 360,000,000 yen. The stadium was known as The Outsourcing Stadium until February 2013. As Shizuoka City and Shimizu S-Pulse reached a 5-year deal with IAI Corporation, a manufacturer of industrial robots, the stadium was renamed as IAI Stadium Nihondaira effective 1 March 2013. This sponsorship deal was extended a further five years in 2018.

== History ==
The stadium first opened in 1991 with the Main Stand as it appears today, with seating in front of grass banks on the other three sides. The initial capacity of seating was 13,000, rising to 15,000 with the grass banking included. In its debut year the stadium was used to host the football tournament of the annual All Japan High School Athletics Meet.

In 1994 the stadium was substantially expanded, adding two-tiered stands behind each goal, and an enlarged Back Stand. In 1995 the capacity reached 20339. Following the installation of an elevator in the Back Stand, the capacity now stands at 20,248. Future expansion is far from impossible, although limited access to the stadium is the biggest hurdle. With the stadium not meeting J. League guidelines for the minimum percentage of seats covered from the elements, the club is exploring the possibility of building a new home.

The stadium's pitch has received the award for the J. League's best kept playing a record nine times. This was in 2004, 2008, 2009, 2010, 2011, 2012, 2013, 2014 and 2015. The Best Pitch Award was abolished in 2016.

When the stadium was built a score board was situated behind the east stand. This was moved to above the west stand following the 1994 expansion. This scoreboard fell out of use, and at the start of the 2007 season a new Astro Vision giant video screen was unveiled in the southeast corner of the ground. The former scoreboard has been repurposed as an advertising hoarding for the stadium sponsor.

2007 and 2008 saw S-Pulse host all home league games at Nihondaira for the first time since 1999. Prior to 1999 S-Pulse often played at the Kusanagi Athletic Stadium. Between 2009 and 2014 the team's higher profile games were frequently hosted at higher capacity arenas; most commonly Ecopa Stadium. Since 2015 the club has played all league and cup games at Nihondaira.

== The stadium ==
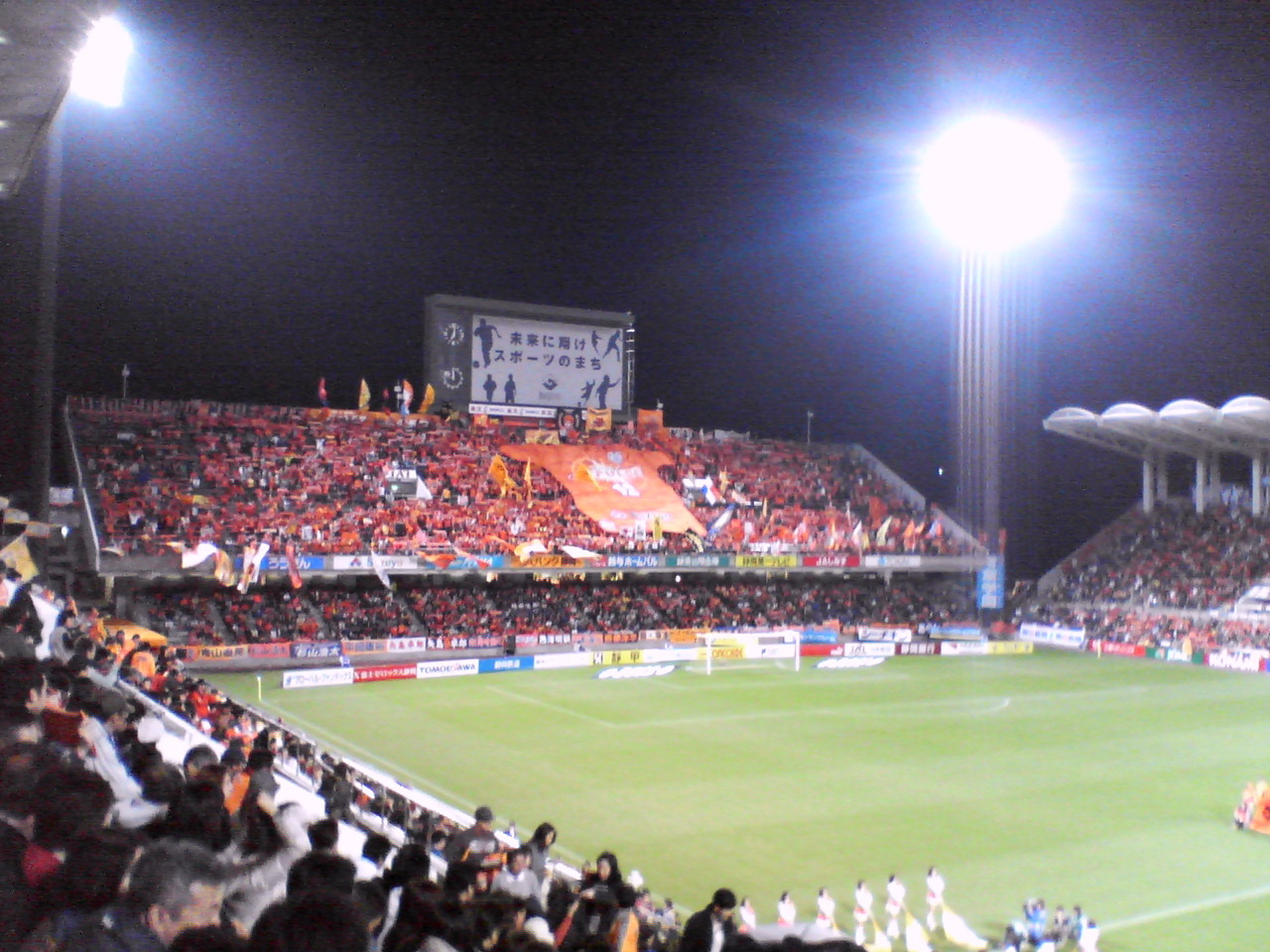
The Kop (West Stand) as seen from the Main Stand for the visit of Kashima Antlers, April 2007

The stadium is composed of four separate, all-seated stands:

	The Main Stand (Side)	The Back Stand (Side)	The West Stand "The Kop" (End)	The East Stand (End)
Seats	4,752	5,686	5,006	4,852

The Kop is home to S-Pulse's fans, including a supporter band for each home game.

A percentage of the opposite East Stand is given over to visiting fans. For large followings, the whole stand is occasionally provided for away fans, such as for the local derby against Jubilo Iwata. The lower tier of The Kop and the East Stand are bench seating, with all other areas having individual seats.

With the exception of the central areas of the Main Stand and the Back Stand, all seats at Nihondaira are unreserved.

=== The roof mystery ===
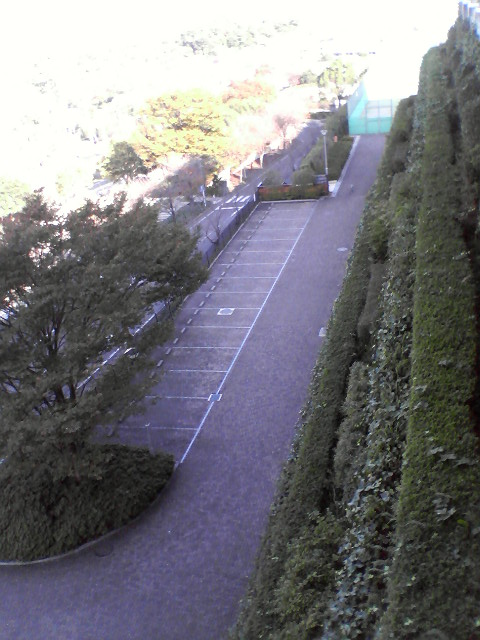
The offending access road

A distinctive feature of the ground is the roof of the Back Stand, and there are several competing theories as to why it runs only two-thirds of the pitch. The most popular of these purports it was intentionally built short so as to afford unobscured views of Mount Fuji across Suruga Bay. However, the reality is that an access road behind the stand has prevented the laying of the foundations necessary to support the roof. Redirecting this access road would take substantial redevelopment of the surrounding road layout which has thus far not proved a worthwhile expense.

=== Records ===
- Record Attendance: 21,931 - Shimizu S-Pulse vs Júbilo Iwata, April 27, 1996

== Access ==
The stadium is located behind a residential area in Shimizu Ward, Shizuoka on the edge of the Nihondaira mountains which divide Shizuoka City. The stadium is surrounded on two sides by green tea fields and due to its elevated position provides panoramic views across Shimizu and Suruga Bay.

The nearest station to the stadium is Shimizu, however, being over 4 km from the ground, the majority of spectators arrive on foot or by shuttle bus services from Shimizu Station and Shizuoka Station. Shuttle bus service starts running three hours before kick off, but for supporters wishing to arrive earlier, local bus lines have services running near Nihondaira, with the closest bus stops ten minutes walk from the stadium. The nearest Shinkansen station is ten minutes by local train west of Shimizu at Shizuoka.

A limited number of general use car parks are available within walking distance of the stadium. Parking adjacent to the stadium is available by prior arrangement only.

== Photo gallery ==
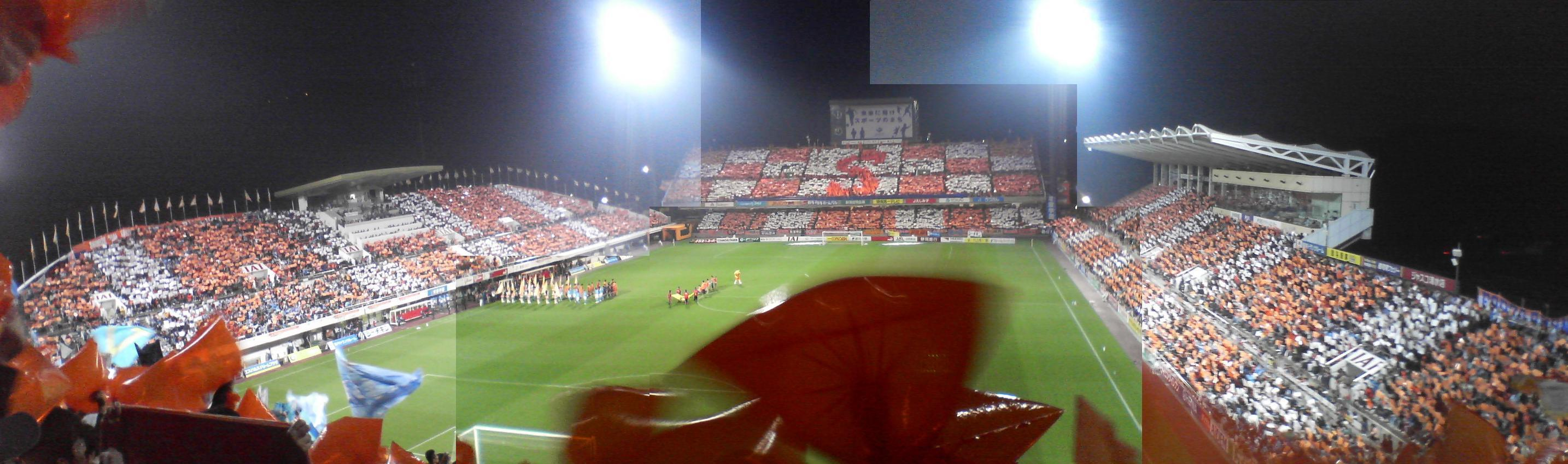
A view from the East Stand as the players take to the field for the 2007 Shizuoka derby which attracted 20,318 people; S-Pulse's biggest crowd of the 2007 season.

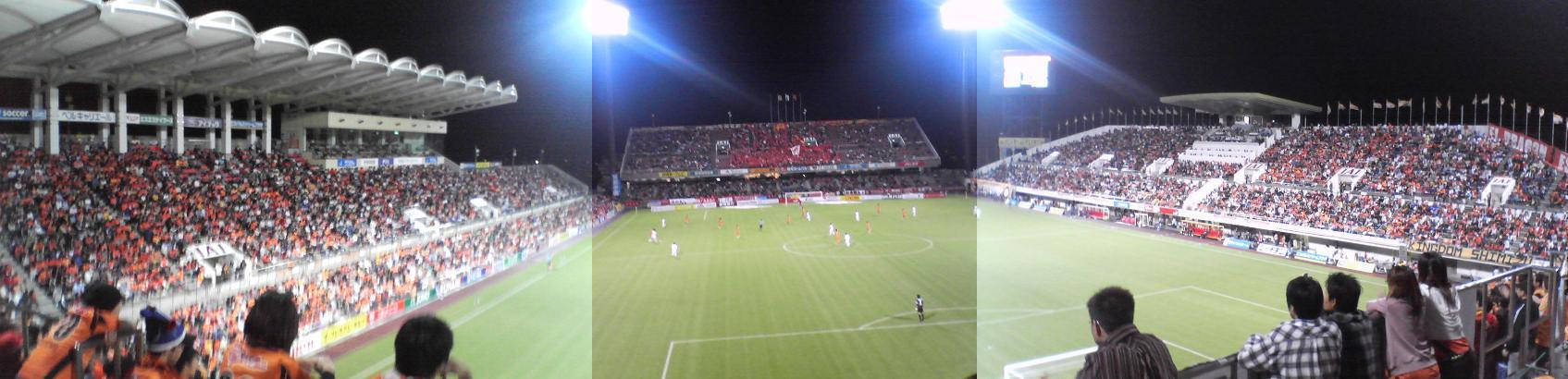
A view from the Kop during a home J-League clash with Nagoya Grampus Eight, October 2007.
