= Yohei Takeda =

Japanese footballer

Yohei Takeda 武田 洋平
Personal information
- Full name: Yohei Takeda
- Date of birth: June 30, 1987 (age 39)
- Place of birth: Hirakata, Osaka, Japan
- Height: 1.89 m (6 ft 2 1/2 in)
- Position: Goalkeeper

Team information
- Current team: Nagoya Grampus
- Number: 16

Youth career
- Nishinagao FC
- Hirakata Fujita SC
- –2002: Ohzu Junior High School
- 2003–2005: Ohzu High School

Senior career*
Years	Team	Apps	(Gls)
2006–2012	Shimizu S-Pulse	4	(0)
2011	→ Albirex Niigata (loan)	4	(0)
2012	→ Gamba Osaka (loan)	0	(0)
2013	Cerezo Osaka	1	(0)
2014–2015	Oita Trinita	74	(0)
2016–	Nagoya Grampus	41	(0)

International career
2007	Japan U-20	1	(0)
Medal record
Shimizu S-Pulse
Runner-up	J.League Cup	2008
Runner-up	Emperor's Cup	2010
Gamba Osaka
Runner-up	Emperor's Cup	2012
Representing Japan
AFC U-19 Championship
Silver medal – second place	2006 India
- * Club domestic league appearances and goals as of 12 August 2026

Yohei Takeda (武田 洋平, born June 30, 1987) is a Japanese football player for Nagoya Grampus.

== National team career ==
In July 2007, Takeda was elected Japan U-20 national team for 2007 U-20 World Cup. At this tournament, he played 1 match against Nigeria.

== Club statistics ==
Updated to 19 July 2022.

Club performance			League		Cup		League Cup		Continental		Other		Total	
Season	Club	League	Apps	Goals	Apps	Goals	Apps	Goals	Apps	Goals	Apps	Goals	Apps	Goals
Japan			League		Emperor's Cup		J.League Cup		AFC		Other^{1}		Total	
2006	Shimizu S-Pulse	J1 League	0	0	0	0	0	0	–		–		0	0
2007	Shimizu S-Pulse	J1 League	0	0	0	0	0	0	–		–		0	0
2008	Shimizu S-Pulse	J1 League	0	0	0	0	0	0	–		–		0	0
2009	Shimizu S-Pulse	J1 League	0	0	0	0	0	0	–		–		0	0
2010	Shimizu S-Pulse	J1 League	4	0	1	0	2	0	–		–		7	0
2011	Shimizu S-Pulse	J1 League	0	0	–		0	0	–		–		0	0
2011	Albirex Niigata	J1 League	4	0	0	0	2	0	–		–		6	0
2012	Gamba Osaka	J1 League	0	0	6	0	1	0	0	0	–		7	0
2013	Cerezo Osaka	J1 League	1	0	1	0	0	0	–		–		2	0
2014	Oita Trinita	J2 League	41	0	0	0	–		–		–		41	0
2015	Oita Trinita	J2 League	33	0	0	0	–		–		2	0	35	0
2016	Nagoya Grampus	J1 League	7	0	0	0	2	0	–		–		9	0
2017	Nagoya Grampus	J2 League	9	0	1	0	–		–		2	0	12	0
2018	Nagoya Grampus	J1 League	0	0	0	0	5	0	–		–		5	0
2019	Nagoya Grampus	J1 League	3	0	1	0	8	0	–		–		12	0
2020	Nagoya Grampus	J1 League	0	0	–		0	0	–		–		0	0
2021	Nagoya Grampus	J1 League	0	0	0	0	0	0	1	0	–		1	0
2022	Nagoya Grampus	J1 League	2	0	2	0	3	0	–		–		7	0
Total			104	0	12	0	23	0	1	0	4	0	144	0

^{1}Includes J1 Playoffs and J2/J3 Playoffs.

== Honours ==
Nagoya Grampus

- J.League Cup: 2021, 2024
