= Kaito Yamamoto =

Japanese footballer

Kaito Yamamoto 山本 海人
Personal information
- Full name: Kaito Yamamoto
- Date of birth: 10 July 1985 (age 41)
- Place of birth: Shizuoka, Japan
- Height: 1.88 m (6 ft 2 in)
- Position: Goalkeeper

Youth career
- 1998–2003: Shimizu S-Pulse

Senior career*
Years	Team	Apps	(Gls)
2004–2012	Shimizu S-Pulse	62	(0)
2013–2016	Vissel Kobe	74	(0)
2017	JEF United Chiba	2	(0)
2018	Yokohama FC	7	(0)
2019–2020	Roasso Kumamoto	34	(0)
2021–2024	Fukushima United FC	80	(0)
Medal record
Shimizu S-Pulse
Runner-up	J.League Cup	2008
Runner-up	J.League Cup	2012
Runner-up	Emperor's Cup	2005
Runner-up	Emperor's Cup	2010
- * Club domestic league appearances and goals as of 30 August 2023

Kaito Yamamoto (山本 海人, Yamamoto Kaito; born 10 July 1985) is a Japanese football player who plays for Fukushima United FC.

== Club career ==
Having worked his way through the S-Pulse youth system, he signed full professional terms at the start of the 2004 season. Yamamoto has thus far been a deputy to the omnipresent Yohei Nishibe.

== National team career ==
In June 2005, Yamamoto was selected for the Japan U-20 national team during the 2005 World Youth Championship. In August 2008, he was selected for the Japan U-23 national team at the 2008 Summer Olympics. But he did not play in the match, as he was the team's reserve goalkeeper behind Shusaku Nishikawa in both tournaments.

== Club statistics ==
Updated to 10 April 2020.

Club	Season	League		Cup^{1}		League Cup^{2}		Total	
Club	Season	Apps	Goals	Apps	Goals	Apps	Goals	Apps	Goals
Shimizu S-Pulse	2004	0	0	0	0	0	0	0	0
Shimizu S-Pulse	2005	0	0	0	0	0	0	0	0
Shimizu S-Pulse	2006	0	0	0	0	2	0	2	0
Shimizu S-Pulse	2007	1	0	1	0	2	0	4	0
Shimizu S-Pulse	2008	13	0	1	0	3	0	17	0
Shimizu S-Pulse	2009	20	0	1	0	8	0	29	0
Shimizu S-Pulse	2010	0	0	3	0	0	0	3	0
Shimizu S-Pulse	2011	20	0	3	0	2	0	25	0
Shimizu S-Pulse	2012	8	0	2	0	9	0	19	0
Vissel Kobe	2013	18	0	0	0	-	-	18	0
Vissel Kobe	2014	27	0	0	0	8	0	35	0
Vissel Kobe	2015	29	0	1	0	8	0	38	0
Vissel Kobe	2016	0	0	0	0	0	0	0	0
JEF United Chiba	2017	2	0	1	0	-		3	0
Yokohama FC	2018	7	0	0	0	-		7	0
Roasso Kumamoto	2019	34	0	1	0	-		35	0
Total		179	0	14	0	42	0	235	0

^{1}Includes Emperor's Cup.

^{2}Includes J.League Cup.
