= Takuma Edamura =

Japanese footballer

Takuma Edamura 枝村 匠馬
Personal information
- Full name: Takuma Edamura
- Date of birth: 16 November 1986 (age 39)
- Place of birth: Makinohara, Shizuoka, Japan
- Height: 1.77 m (5 ft 10 in)
- Position: Midfielder

Youth career
- 1999–2004: Shimizu S-Pulse

Senior career*
Years	Team	Apps	(Gls)
2005–2018	Shimizu S-Pulse	254	(35)
2012–2013	→ Cerezo Osaka (loan)	39	(6)
2014	→ Nagoya Grampus (loan)	14	(0)
2014	→ Vissel Kobe (loan)	13	(0)
2018	→ Avispa Fukuoka (loan)	26	(1)
2019	Tochigi SC	28	(0)
2020–2021	Fujieda MYFC	1	(0)
Medal record
Shimizu S-Pulse
Runner-up	J.League Cup	2008
Runner-up	J.League Cup	2012
Runner-up	Emperor's Cup	2005
Runner-up	Emperor's Cup	2010
- * Club domestic league appearances and goals as of 11:29, 7 July 2020 (UTC)

Takuma Edamura (枝村 匠馬 Edamura Takuma, born 16 November 1986 in Makinohara, Shizuoka, Japan) is a Japanese footballer.

== Career ==
Edamura was born in Shizuoka Prefecture. Having worked his way through the youth ranks of his local Shimizu S-Pulse club team, he signed full-time terms in 2005. Since 2006, he has been a regular member of the first team.

He joined Cerezo Osaka during the summer transfer market in 2012.

== Club career stats ==
Updated to 23 February 2018.

Club performance			League		Cup		League Cup		Total	
Season	Club	League	Apps	Goals	Apps	Goals	Apps	Goals	Apps	Goals
Japan			League		Emperor's Cup		League Cup		Total	
2005	Shimizu S-Pulse	J1 League	8	0	5	0	1	0	14	0
2006	Shimizu S-Pulse	J1 League	34	9	3	0	6	2	43	11
2007	Shimizu S-Pulse	J1 League	28	3	3	0	2	1	33	4
2008	Shimizu S-Pulse	J1 League	30	8	3	1	11	4	44	13
2009	Shimizu S-Pulse	J1 League	32	6	2	0	10	3	44	9
2010	Shimizu S-Pulse	J1 League	12	3	1	0	6	1	19	4
2011	Shimizu S-Pulse	J1 League	27	1	4	0	2	0	33	1
2012	Shimizu S-Pulse	J1 League	4	0	-		2	0	6	0
2012	Cerezo Osaka	J1 League	15	4	4	0	-		19	4
2013	Cerezo Osaka	J1 League	24	2	3	2	5	0	32	4
2014	Nagoya Grampus	J1 League	14	0	0	0	3	0	17	0
2014	Vissel Kobe	J1 League	13	0	-		-		13	0
2015	Shimizu S-Pulse	J1 League	26	2	0	0	4	0	30	2
2016	Shimizu S-Pulse	J2 League	23	3	1	1	–		24	4
2017	Shimizu S-Pulse	J1 League	30	0	3	0	2	0	35	0
Career total			320	41	32	4	54	11	396	56
