= Kazuki Hara =

Japanese footballer

Kazuki Hara 原 一樹
Personal information
- Full name: Kazuki Hara
- Date of birth: January 5, 1985 (age 41)
- Place of birth: Matsudo, Chiba, Japan
- Height: 1.77 m (5 ft 10 in)
- Position: Forward

Team information
- Current team: Ococias Kyoto AC
- Number: 9

Youth career
- 2000–2002: Municipal Funabashi High School
- 2003–2006: Komazawa University

Senior career*
Years	Team	Apps	(Gls)
2007–2010	Shimizu S-Pulse	62	(11)
2011	Urawa Red Diamonds	10	(0)
2012–2013	Kyoto Sanga	54	(18)
2014–2016	Giravanz Kitakyushu	116	(36)
2017–2018	Kamatamare Sanuki	66	(15)
2019	Roasso Kumamoto	20	(7)
2020–	Ococias Kyoto AC		

International career^{‡}
2003	Japan U-20	1	(0)
Medal record
Shimizu S-Pulse
Runner-up	J.League Cup	2008
Runner-up	Emperor's Cup	2010
Urawa Reds
Runner-up	J.League Cup	2011
- * Club domestic league appearances and goals as of 23 February 2020 ‡ National team caps and goals as of December 31, 2008

Kazuki Hara (原 一樹, Hara Kazuki; born January 5, 1985) is a Japanese footballer for Ococias Kyoto AC.

== Career ==
He joined S-Pulse after graduating at Komazawa University and plays in the forward position.

== Career statistics ==
Updated to 23 February 2020.

=== Club ===
Club	Season	League		Emperor's Cup		J. League Cup		Total	
Club	Season	Apps	Goals	Apps	Goals	Apps	Goals	Apps	Goals
Shimizu S-Pulse	2007	1	0	2	1	1	0	4	1
Shimizu S-Pulse	2008	26	6	3	1	9	1	38	8
Shimizu S-Pulse	2009	25	3	3	2	8	2	36	7
Shimizu S-Pulse	2010	10	2	3	2	9	2	22	6
Urawa Red Diamonds	2011	10	0	4	4	1	0	15	4
Kyoto Sanga	2012	26	6	1	0	-		27	6
Kyoto Sanga	2013	27	12	0	0	-		27	12
Giravanz Kitakyushu	2014	42	7	4	2	-		46	9
Giravanz Kitakyushu	2015	41	13	2	1	-		43	14
Giravanz Kitakyushu	2016	33	16	2	0	-		35	16
Kamatamare Sanuki	2017	31	7	0	0	-		31	7
Kamatamare Sanuki	2018	35	8	1	0	-		36	8
Roasso Kumamoto	2019	20	7	0	0	-		20	7
Career total		333	87	25	13	28	5	380	105

=== International ===
National team	Year	Apps	Goals
Japan U-20	2003	1	0
Japan U-20	Total	1	0

=== Appearances in major competitions ===
Team	Competition	Category	Appearances		Goals	Team record
Team	Competition	Category	Start	Sub	Goals	Team record
Japan	AFC Youth Championship 2004 qualification	U-18	1	0	0	Qualified
