= Yasuhiro Hiraoka =

Japanese footballer

Yasuhiro Hiraoka 平岡 康裕
Personal information
- Full name: Yasuhiro Hiraoka
- Date of birth: 23 May 1986 (age 40)
- Place of birth: Fujinomiya, Shizuoka, Japan
- Height: 1.82 m (6 ft 0 in)
- Position: Defender

Team information
- Current team: Ehime FC

Youth career
- 2002–2004: Shimizu Shogyo High School

Senior career*
Years	Team	Apps	(Gls)
2005–2016	Shimizu S-Pulse	153	(12)
2008	→ Consadole Sapporo (loan)	14	(0)
2016	→ Vegalta Sendai (loan)	28	(0)
2017–2022	Vegalta Sendai	172	(4)
2023–	Ehime FC	0	(0)
Medal record
Shimizu S-Pulse
Runner-up	J.League Cup	2012
Runner-up	Emperor's Cup	2005
Runner-up	Emperor's Cup	2010
Vegalta Sendai
Runner-up	Emperor's Cup	2018
- * Club domestic league appearances and goals as of 5 November 2022, 8:04 (UTC)

Yasuhiro Hiraoka (平岡 康裕, Hiraoka Yasuhiro; born 23 May 1986 in Fujinomiya, Shizuoka) is a Japanese footballer who plays for Ehime FC from 2023.

== Club career ==
On 18 December 2022, Hiraoka joined to J3 club, Ehime FC for upcoming 2023 season.

== Career statistics ==
Updated to the end 2022 season.

Club performance			League		Cup		League Cup		Total	
Season	Club	League	Apps	Goals	Apps	Goals	Apps	Goals	Apps	Goals
Japan			League		Emperor's Cup		J. League Cup		Total	
2005	Shimizu S-Pulse	J1 League	0	0	0	0	0	0	0	0
2006	Shimizu S-Pulse	J1 League	4	0	1	0	4	0	9	0
2007	Shimizu S-Pulse	J1 League	3	0	0	0	4	0	7	0
2008	Consadole Sapporo	J1 League	14	0	0	0	3	1	17	1
2009	Shimizu S-Pulse	J1 League	3	0	5	0	2	0	10	0
2010	Shimizu S-Pulse	J1 League	27	2	1	0	9	1	37	3
2011	Shimizu S-Pulse	J1 League	24	0	4	0	3	0	31	0
2012	Shimizu S-Pulse	J1 League	28	0	2	0	10	1	40	1
2013	Shimizu S-Pulse	J1 League	30	5	3	0	4	1	37	6
2014	Shimizu S-Pulse	J1 League	34	5	4	0	6	0	44	5
2015	Shimizu S-Pulse	J1 League	18	0	0	0	1	0	19	0
2016	Vegalta Sendai	J1 League	28	0	1	0	5	0	34	0
2017	Vegalta Sendai	J1 League	33	0	0	0	5	0	38	0
2018	Vegalta Sendai	J1 League	27	0	4	1	3	1	34	2
2019	Vegalta Sendai	J1 League	29	2	0	0	3	0	32	2
2020	Vegalta Sendai	J1 League	28	1	ー		1	0	29	1
2021	Vegalta Sendai	J1 League	25	0	0	0	1	0	26	0
2022	Vegalta Sendai	J2 League	30	1	1	0	ー		31	1
2023	Ehime FC	J3 League	0	0	0	0	0	0	0	0
Career total			385	16	26	1	64	5	485	22
