= Akihiro Hyodo =

Japanese footballer (born 1982)

Akihiro Hyodo 兵働 昭弘
Personal information
- Full name: Akihiro Hyodo
- Date of birth: 12 May 1982 (age 44)
- Place of birth: Shiroi, Chiba, Japan
- Height: 1.80 m (5 ft 11 in)
- Position: Midfielder

Youth career
- 1998–2000: Yachiyo High School

College career
Years	Team	Apps	(Gls)
2001–2004	University of Tsukuba		

Senior career*
Years	Team	Apps	(Gls)
2005–2010	Shimizu S-Pulse	119	(11)
2011	Kashiwa Reysol	16	(1)
2012–2014	JEF United Chiba	106	(13)
2015	Oita Trinita	33	(2)
2016	Mito HollyHock	41	(0)
2017	Ventforet Kofu	23	(1)
2018	Shimizu S-Pulse	5	(0)
Medal record
Shimizu S-Pulse
Runner-up	J.League Cup	2008
Runner-up	Emperor's Cup	2005
Runner-up	Emperor's Cup	2010
Kashiwa Reysol
Winner	J1 League	2011
- * Club domestic league appearances and goals as of 17 December 2018

Akihiro Hyodo (兵働 昭弘, Hyōdō Akihiro; born 12 May 1982) is a former Japanese footballer.

== Career ==
After graduating high school, he entered the University of Tsukuba, where he represented them in football. After graduating in 2005, he signed for Shimizu S-Pulse. Hyodo scored his first professional goal against Omiya Ardija in August of the same year.

After retiring at the end of the 2018 season, he joined Shimizu S-Pulse as a scout in June 2019.

== Club statistics ==
Updated to 23 December 2018.

Club performance			League		Cup		League Cup		Other		Total	
Season	Club	League	Apps	Goals	Apps	Goals	Apps	Goals	Apps	Goals	Apps	Goals
Japan			League		Emperor's Cup		J. League Cup		Other^{1}		Total	
2005	Shimizu S-Pulse	J1 League	15	2	5	1	2	0	–		22	3
2006	Shimizu S-Pulse	J1 League	21	5	2	0	5	0	–		28	5
2007	Shimizu S-Pulse	J1 League	31	2	3	0	5	0	–		39	2
2008	Shimizu S-Pulse	J1 League	23	1	2	1	7	1	–		32	3
2009	Shimizu S-Pulse	J1 League	29	1	4	0	10	1	–		43	2
2010	Shimizu S-Pulse	J1 League	33	4	4	1	8	0	–		45	5
2011	Kashiwa Reysol	J1 League	16	1	0	0	0	0	1	0	17	1
2012	JEF United Chiba	J2 League	41	7	2	1	–		2	0	45	8
2013	JEF United Chiba	J2 League	30	4	2	0	–		1	0	33	4
2014	JEF United Chiba	J2 League	35	2	2	0	–		–		37	2
2015	Oita Trinita	J2 League	33	2	1	0	–		–		34	2
2016	Mito HollyHock	J2 League	41	0	0	0	–		–		41	0
2017	Ventforet Kofu	J1 League	23	1	0	0	0	0	–		23	1
2018	Shimizu S-Pulse	J1 League	5	0	1	0	5	0	–		11	0
Total			343	28	28	4	42	2	4	0	407	34

^{1}Includes Japanese Super Cup and J2 playoffs.
