= Shōgen-ji =

Myoshin-ji temple in Shizuoka, Japan

Shōgen-ji 承元寺
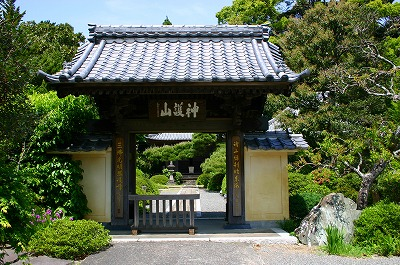
- Main Gate

Religion
- Affiliation: Myōshin-ji Rinzai

Location
- Location: 299 Shōgenji-chō, Shimizu-ku, Shizuoka, Shizuoka Prefecture
- Country: Japan
- Interactive map of Shōgen-ji 承元寺

Architecture
- Completed: 817 (acc. legend)

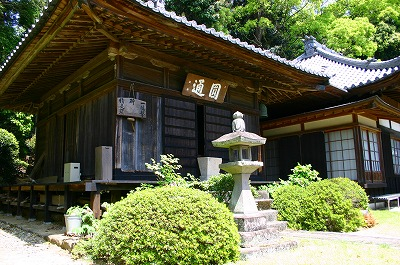
Kannon-dō and part of the main hall

Shōgen-ji (承元寺; founded ca 817 CE) is a temple of the Myoshin-ji branch of Japanese Rinzai School of Zen Buddhism in Shimizu-ku, Shizuoka, Japan.

== History ==
According to the oral tradition, Shōgen-ji was initially built as a Tendai temple during Saicho's visit to Eastern Japan in 817. At that time, the temple's name was most likely written differently, i.e. as 正源寺. Later, in the Kamakura period the temple was transferred to the Rinzai School and renamed to its present characters borrowing the characters of the Jōgen (also read as Shōgen) imperial era (承元, 1207–11).

Historically verifiable records indicate that during the Muromachi period the temple was selected as one of regional "peace-protection temples" ankoku-ji (安国寺) by the Muromachi bakufu. It was burned to the ground during Takeda Shingen's invasion of Suruga. In the Edo period a Shinto shrine named "Divine Protection Mountain" shingosan (神護山) was added to the rebuilt temple's premises, hence the full title of the temple at present is Shingosan Shōgen Ankoku Zen-ji (神護山承元安国禅寺).

The present abbot of the temple is Zen master, Soiku Shigematsu

== Location ==
Take a bus headed to Tadanuma Shako 但沼車庫 from Okitsu Station (approx. 10 min) or Shimizu Station (approx. 30 min), exit at Shōgenji Mae 承元寺前, walk down across the river for 10 min. Otherwise take a taxi from Okitsu Station.

Address: 299 Shōgenji-cho, Shimizu-ku, Shizuoka, Japan 424-0201.
