= Shimizu S-Pulse =

Japanese football club

Shimizu S-Pulse 清水エスパルス
- Full name: Shimizu S-Pulse
- Nickname: S-Pa
- Founded: 1991; 35 years ago as Shimizu FC
- Ground: IAI Stadium Nihondaira; Shimizu, Shizuoka
- Capacity: 19,594
- Chairman: Shigeo Hidaritomo
- Manager: Takayuki Yoshida
- League: J1 League
- 2026: J1 League, 14th of 20
- Website: www.s-pulse.co.jp
Home colours	Away colours

Shimizu S-Pulse (清水エスパルス, Shimizu Esuparusu) is a Japanese professional football club located in Shimizu-ku, Shizuoka, Shizuoka Prefecture. S-Pulse is going to compete in the J1 League for the 2025 Season, after winning promotion from the Japanese second tier of professional league football, the J2 League in the 2024 season. The club was formed in 1991 as a founding member of the J.League ("Original Ten"), (Note: The Original Ten of the J.League in 1992 were Kashima Antlers, Urawa Red Diamonds, JEF United Ichihara, Verdy Kawasaki, Yokohama Marinos, Yokohama Flügels, Shimizu S-Pulse, Nagoya Grampus Eight, Gamba Osaka and Sanfrecce Hiroshima.) which began the following year. The club originally consisted of players drawn exclusively from Shizuoka Prefecture, a unique distinction at the time.

Despite the club's cup competition prowess, the J.League Division 1 title has so far eluded them. The closest Shimizu came was in 1999 when, after winning the league's second stage, they lost out on the title in a penalty shootout. When scores remained level after both legs of the title deciding match, Júbilo Iwata, S-Pulse's local rivals, prevailed. Former Shimizu and national team player Kenta Hasegawa, who made a substitute appearance in the second leg of this title decider, became club manager in 2005. He was the longest serving manager in the club's history, in office until 2010. He resigned at the end of the season after failing to win any competitions and was replaced by Afshin Ghotbi. Ghotbi's tenure lasted over 3 years, keeping the club as a mid-table J1 team until his departure in early 2014. From that season onward the club have churned through managers & become a yo-yo club with relegation zone finishes in J1 while regularly winning promotion in J2.

Given the club's youth when compared to many of their J1 peers, Shimizu have had a relatively large impact on Japanese football. Shimizu have won 1 J2 League title, 1 Emperor's Cup, 1 J.League Cup and 2 Japanese Super Cup. Continentally, Shimizu also won the Asian Cup Winners' Cup in the 1999–00 edition.

== History ==
=== Formation and early years (1991–1995) ===
Shimizu S-Pulse was founded in February 1991 in Shizuoka as Shimizu FC, being one of the original clubs established specifically for the launch of the professional J.League. Unlike most other Japanese football clubs at the time, S-Pulse did not start as a company team, instead starting out as a group of players who were born in Shizuoka. The team was originally run by the company S-Lap Communications, with funding from the citizens and Shizuoka Television.

Two months later, the club name was officially changed to Shimizu S-Pulse. S-Pulse is a combination of the S from Shizuoka, Shimizu, and Soccer, and Pulse from English to mean the spirit of all those who support the team. The club’s name reflects its identity: “S-Pulse” combines the “S” representing Shizuoka, Shimizu, and soccer, with “Pulse” symbolising the energetic spirit of the team and its supporters. Shimizu joined the inaugural J.League season in 1993 and quickly established itself as a competitive side.

==== Shizuoka as a football prefecture ====
Headquarters are established in Shizuoka Prefecture called the football kingdom in Japan. As a prefecture, Shizuoka had historically been a strong footballing area of Japan; in particular being noted for its nationally successful high school teams and the numerous national team players which had emerged from the prefecture over the years. The prefectural police force of Shizuoka actually has an anthropomorphic football as a mascot. The west of the prefecture was already home to the company team of Yamaha Motor Corporation who played in the Japan Soccer League and who would later go on to form Júbilo Iwata, but it was believed there was room for another team for the football-hungry population. An earlier attempt had been made in the 1970s with the local club belonging to Nippon Light Metal Corp., which briefly competed in the JSL Division 2 under the name Hagoromo Club. With the advent of the professional league at the start of the 1990s, the concept of creating a team to both sign and represent the local footballing talent was fomented.

On 4 February 1991, Shimizu were approved by the J.League to compete in the newly formed professional league to start the following year. The club played its first ever game against Gamba Osaka on 4 July 1992, a date which is celebrated as the club's memorial birthday. The match took place at the Nagai Stadium in Osaka. The club's first competitive game was in the 1992 J.League Cup against Nagoya Grampus on September 5 at the Mizuho Athletic Stadium, and ended in a 3–2 defeat. Their competitive home début was held at Nihondaira Stadium shortly after on September 9 against Yokohama Marinos, which Shimizu won 2–1. Shimizu first league game was played in May 1993 away to Yokohama Flügels at Mitsuzawa Stadium. Flügels won 3–2. The first home league game was a 2–1 victory against Sanfrecce Hiroshima on May 19 of the same year.

After being approved for participation in the J.League Shimizu competed in the inaugural 1992 J.League Cup and made it to their first final. However, the dream start ended with defeat at the hands of Verdy Kawasaki. In 1993, Shimizu became one of the ten founder members of the new J.League, and finished third after the 1st and 2nd stages were combined. Their second venture into the J.League Cup was another near miss, again losing in the final to Verdy Kawasaki.

=== Domestic success and cup victories (1996–2005) ===
The late 1990s and early 2000s represented one of the most successful periods in the club’s history. In 1996, Shimizu won the J.League Cup, securing their first major domestic trophy.

In the 1996 season, Shimizu got their hands on winning the 1996 J.League Cup and also gained revenge on Verdy Kawasaki, beating them 5–4 on penalties in the final.

==== Continental success (2002) ====
The year 1999 was marked with Shimizu first appearance in the Japanese Super Cup, replacing Yokohama Flügels after their merger with Yokohama Marinos. However, Shimizu lost the match 2–1. After performing well in both league stages, S-Pulse were up against local rivals Júbilo Iwata in the title decider, and after a 3–3 aggregate draw, lost the tie 4–2 on penalties. The new millennium brought better results for Shimizu. Victory in the Asian Cup Winners' Cup in 2000 and victory in the final of the 2001 Emperor's Cup meant that the Shimizu trophy cabinet was beginning to fill up, and victories in the 2001 and 2002 Japanese Super Cup meant that the club had won four cups in three years.

In 2005, Shimizu closed the year with a run to the Emperor's Cup final in which they did not concede a single goal. However, this changed in the final against Urawa Red Diamonds, which they lost 2–1. After a near-miss in the league, avoiding a relegation play-off by only goal difference, manager Kenta Hasegawa's work started to pay off the following year.

=== Transitional period (2006–2015) ===
In both the 2006 season and the 2007 season, Shimizu performed strongly in the league and finished in 4th place, followed by a fifth place standing in the 2008 season. However, early exits in both cup competitions in 2006 and 2007, means they are currently without a trophy for five years. This is the longest barren spell in their history, although in 2008 they came close, being defeated in the final of the League Cup by Ōita Trinita.

In 2011, Shimizu made the "Signing of the Century" by making a move to complete the signing of Swedish and Arsenal legend Freddie Ljungberg. It is considered by many Japanese to be one of the greatest signings in league history. Many also believed that the signing would boost football in baseball-fanatic Japan, however Ljungberg departed, and subsequently retired, after 5 1/2 months with the club. Later managements would turn out to be a catalyst for Shimizu's luck to run out in the next seasons.

Shimizu would play four more seasons in J1, until their first-tier stay was broken in the 2015 season. The club was in good standing early in the first stage until they collapsed later, falling into the bottom three. Home fans were disappointed at the way their club was playing. Shimizu failed to improve in the second stage, being at the relegation positions. After 23 seasons in the top flight, they were relegated to J2 (and the second tier) for the first time in their history after a 1–0 home loss to Vegalta Sendai on 17 October 2015.

=== Relegation and return (2016–2021) ===
In 2015, Shimizu suffered relegation from the J1 League for the first time in their history. The club competed in the J2 League during the 2016 season and secured immediate promotion back to the top division by finishing near the top of the standings.

Shimizu bounced back to top flight football immediately, securing promotion to the J1 League on the final matchweek of the 2016 J2 League.

=== Recent seasons (2022–present) ===
After six years at J1 League, in which they spent five of the six years on the lower half of the table, Shimizu returned to J2 League after being confirmed relegation from the J1 on the last matchweek, having finished in 17th place, just above their rivals Júbilo Iwata.

On 27 October 2024, Shimizu secured promotion to J1 League after narrowly defeating Tochigi SC 1–0, with a goal from Jelani Reshaun Sumiyoshi in the 50th minute. As a result, Shimizu returned to the top flight after an absence of two years.

== Team image ==
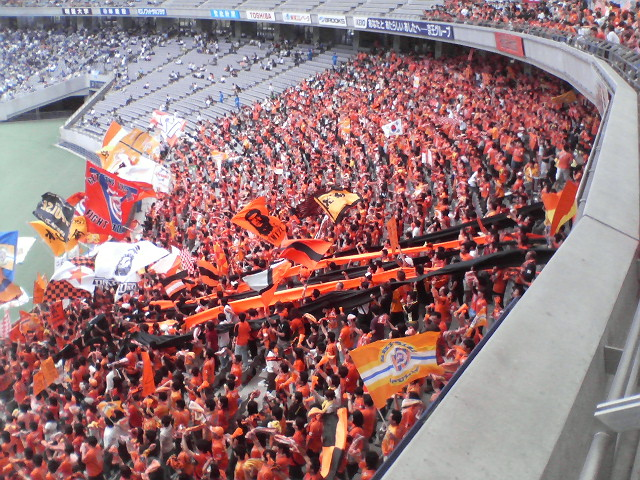
Shimizu fans make the hundred mile trip to FC Tokyo in September 2007

=== Supporters ===
In common with other J.League teams, Shimizu have a colourful and noisy collection of supporters who follow the team around the country. A supporter band is present at games home and away to help galvanise support and raise the decibel levels. The band models itself to a large degree after its Brazilian counterparts, and Latin rhythms and samba sounds predominate. For home games, Shimizu's more vocal supporters gather in the second tier of The Kop; the stand behind the west goal at Nihondaira Stadium. Also in this area can be found Shimizu's various organised supporter groups. These groups include fan clubs dedicated to specific players and are often identifiable by unique uniforms. These fan clubs work to organise events which include mass choreographed displays and the supporter band. Also housed in The Kop are Shimizu's band of ultras, who each game take over a central area behind the goal which has been dubbed The Dragon Zone. Often physical, it is not uncommon for the area to descend into a mosh pit after important goals, and signs posted around the stand inform and caution general supporters of the area's lively nature. The club's official fan club has several branches around the country, and S-Pulse supporters are officially listed as the team's twelfth player.

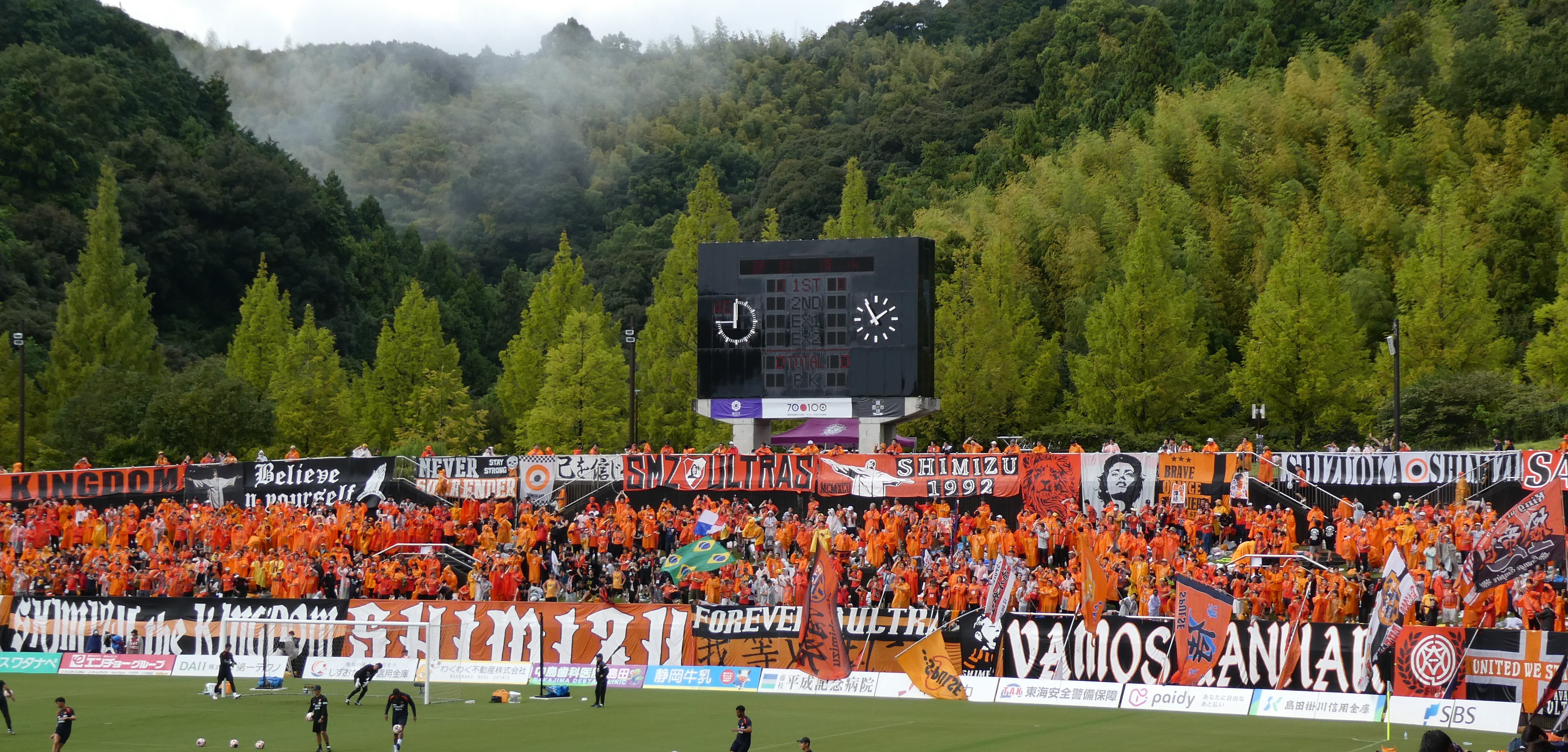
Shimizu ultras

=== Rivalries ===
Shimizu share Shizuoka Prefecture with fierce local rivals, Júbilo Iwata. The rivalry dates back to the formation of the J.League when the newly formed S-Pulse were chosen ahead of Júbilo to take part in the first J.League season. Jubilo, who had existed as Yamaha FC in the Japan Soccer League since 1980, had to earn promotion via the 1992 season of the new Japan Football League. This has remained a bone of contention between long standing fans.

With Shizuoka long recognised as the homeland of football in Japan, the two teams have a history of fighting over the best players produced by the region's high schools and universities. Good examples being Naohiro Takahara and Takahiro Yamanishi, who, after graduating from Shimizu Higashi High School, went on to sign for the Júbilo team which won three J.League championships between 1997 and 2002.

Alongside off-field factors, Shimizu and Júbilo are locked in a perpetual struggle for supremacy on the field. During the J.League's infancy, it was Shimizu who experienced the greater success and support, but they found themselves in Iwata's shadow for long periods either side of the turn of the century. Recently, Shimizu have once again emerged as the area's premier club, finishing above Júbilo in the league every season since 2006, and often enjoying further cup runs. 2008 was also the first year since 1995 that S-Pulse succeeded in drawing more supporters through the gates than their rivals.

Also based in Shizuoka are Fujieda MYFC, Azul Claro Numazu and Honda FC. Among those 3 clubs, only Fujieda that currently play at the same level as Shimizu in J2 League, limiting any potential rivalry development with Azul Claro, who play in J3 League and Honda FC, which compete in Japan Football League, a level below J.League, to one-off cup pairings. Despite always performing well, Honda FC have resisted professionalisation and so are unable to join the J.League. The forerunners to Avispa Fukuoka and Sagan Tosu were originally also based in Shizuoka Prefecture, but had to move to Kyushu because of the dominance and fan saturation of Shimizu and Iwata.

=== Ownership ===
Although Suzuyo & Co., Ltd., which is a local major logistics company, had become a parent company just at the present, since the Shimizu S-Pulse was born as a citizen club from the start, vulnerable time suited it in the past in terms of a fund. As well as originally gathering its playing staff almost exclusively from Shizuoka prefecture, local corporation S-Lap Communications ran and financed the club. This was a company funded in part from Shimizu citizens, but in main by Shizuoka Television. After the J.League bubble burst in the late 1990s, Shizuoka Television withdrew backing, and in 1998 only a drastic restructuring kept the club afloat. Ownership of S-Pulse was reorganized between local companies under the leadership of Shimizu-based Suzuyo. It is now run under the company title of S-Pulse, Inc.

Suzuyo & Co., Ltd. also holds ownership of the Danish Superliga football club Randers FC. Moving forward, the ambition from the owners is to relate the two clubs in a way to benefit talent development for both.

=== In culture ===
Despite their relatively short history, Shimizu have had some impact on popular culture beyond football. Current manager and former player of some eight years and over 200 appearances, Kenta Hasegawa, makes occasional appearances in popular manga and anime series Chibi Maruko-chan. In the show a boy with his name and referred to as Kenta-kun is sometimes seen. He loves football and is a classmate of title character Chibi Maruko. The author of the manga, Momoko Sakura, created this character after Hasegawa. Sakura and Hasegawa attended the same primary school during the same period. Unique S-Pulse related Chibi Maruko goods are also produced. In another example, two fictional characters from the popular Captain Tsubasa manga, who, on becoming professional footballers, join Shimizu.

=== Brand ===
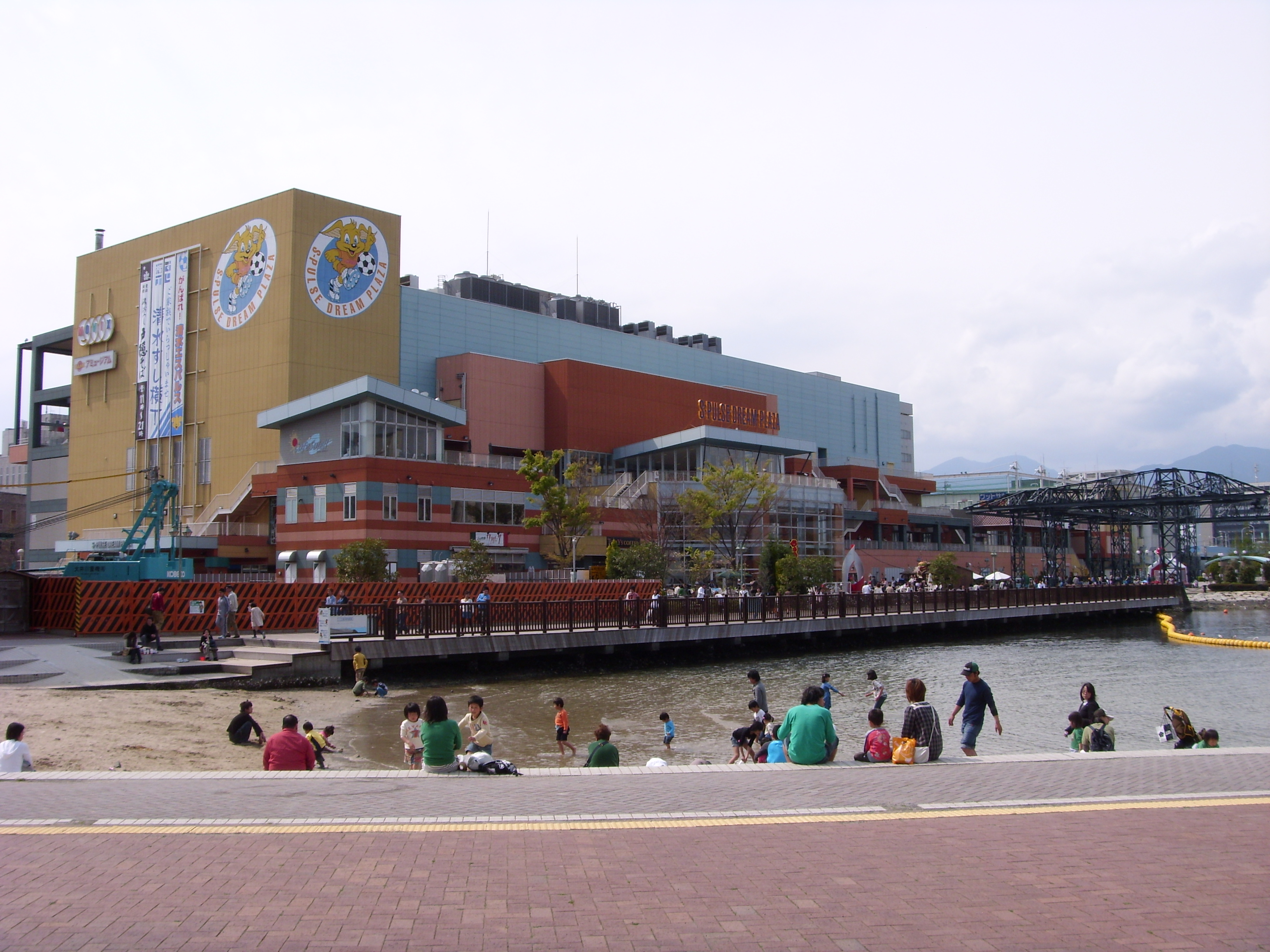
S-Pulse Dream plaza is on the site of a former Shimizukō Line station.

In and around the team's native Shizuoka City there are eight official club shops. Six of these are known as S-Pulse Dream House and serve as both club merchandise stores and match ticket offices. These can be found in Shizuoka, Shimizu, Fujieda, Suntō and Parche shopping centre, part of Shizuoka Station. The Shimizu Dream House also includes a projection screen and viewing area for the broadcasting of away games. The sixth, and newest, Dream House opened in March 2008 in Fuji City. There are two further S-Pulse shops, with one located in Yaizu, and one in S-Pulse Dream Plaza.

S-Pulse Dream Plaza is a shopping and entertainment complex in Shimizu, housing various attractions including restaurants, a ferris wheel, cinema and a football museum. From the nearby Shimizu Port, the S-Pulse Dream Ferry service runs daily to Izu. The team also lends its name to a series of futsal courts named, perhaps predictably, S-Pulse Dream Fields. These facilities are located in Fujieda, Fuji, Sunto and in Shimizu.

Dream Plaza can be found in a redeveloped part of Shimizu Port near the appropriately named S-Pulse Street. This is a road running into the city from the port area of Shimizu and is lined with various statues, monuments and art works related to and inspired by the city's strong association with football. This includes foot and hand prints cast into metal of former notable players, and several S-Pulse-related statues. S-Pulse Street is also home to the Shimizu Branch of the S-Pulse Dream House.

The S-Pulse brand also extends into motorcycle racing, with the S-Pulse Dream Racing Team bearing the football team's name, logo and mascot. The team competes in the All Japan Road Race ST600 class.

== Stadium ==
Main articles: Nihondaira Sports Stadium, Shizuoka "Ecopa" Stadium, Kusanagi Athletic Stadium

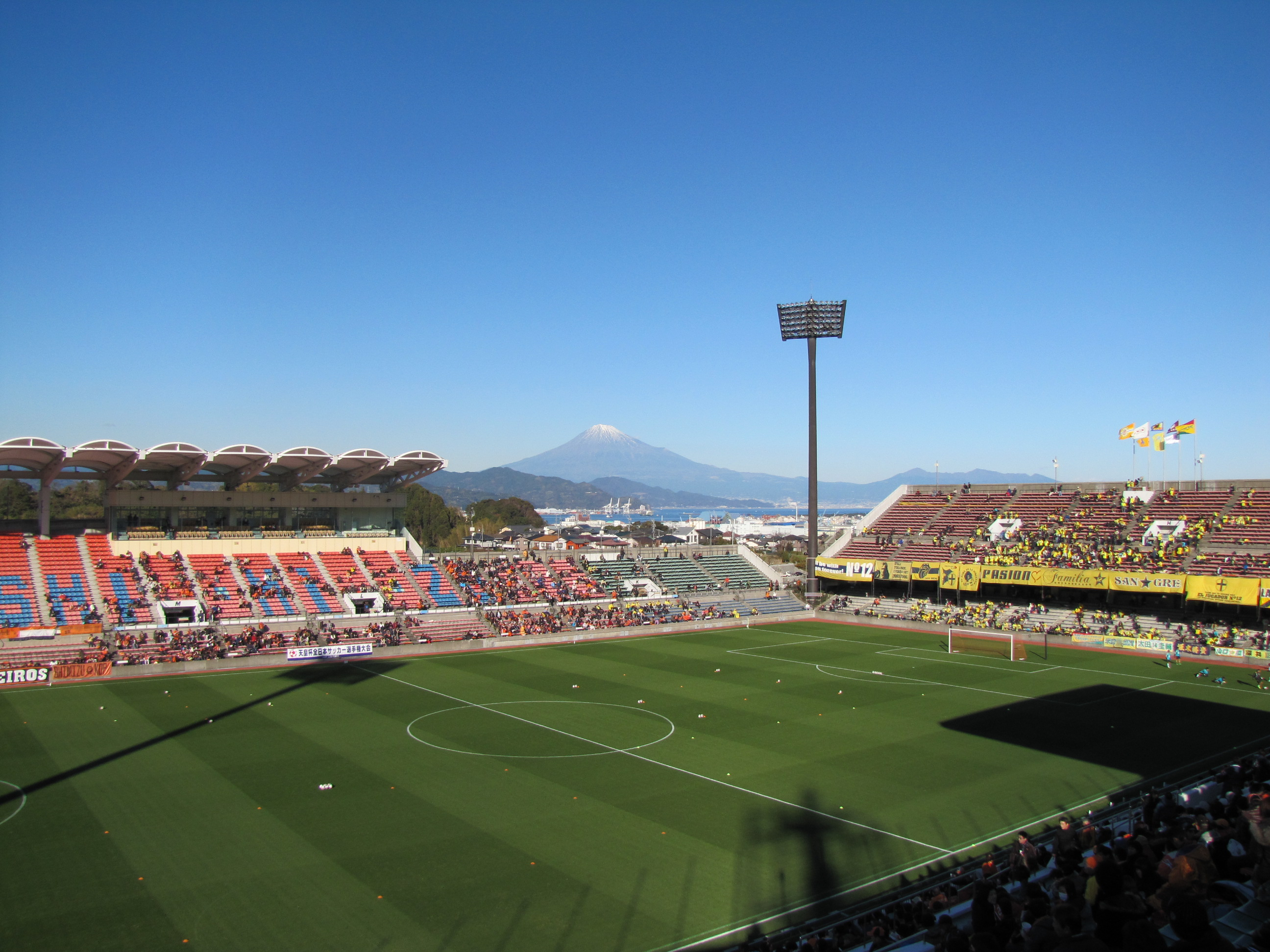
Mount Fuji as seen from Nihondaira Stadium

Shimizu's main home arena is the Nihondaira Sports Stadium located in Shimizu, with a capacity of 19,594. However, over their history home games have been staged at a number of grounds. The first decade of Shimizu's existence sometimes saw 'home' games played outside of Shizuoka prefecture, including at the National Stadium in Tokyo. The most frequently used other venue was Kusanagi Athletic Stadium. Utilised almost equally with Nihondaira over Shimizu's earliest years, this included six home games in 1993. Kusanagi was called home while Nihondairs was enlarged in 1994, and again while the pitch relaid in 2003. With a fully functioning Nihondaira, Kusanagi was used less commonly, with the most recent first team match being held there in 2003.

The most common reason for moving games is the restrictively low capacity of Nihondaira. This has often led the club to stage fixtures against neighbouring Júbilo Iwata and other high-profile clashes, at Shizuoka "Ecopa" Stadium. This stadium was built in 2001 for the following year's 2002 FIFA World Cup and has a capacity of 51,349. Despite still being in Shizuoka Prefecture, Ecopa is over an hour's travel from Shimizu, deep within the Jubilo catchment area. For such a fiercely contested derby, much of the home advantage is lost; a factor which contributed in part to the staging of the 2007 derby at Nihondaira despite demand for tickets far outstripping supply. The decision paid off with a home victory. 2007 saw all home games staged at Nihondaira for the first time since 1999. This was repeated in 2008, although between 2009 and 2015 Ecopa was used for at least one home league game. S-Pulse have chosen not to use Ecopa since 2015, playing all home league games at Nihondaira.

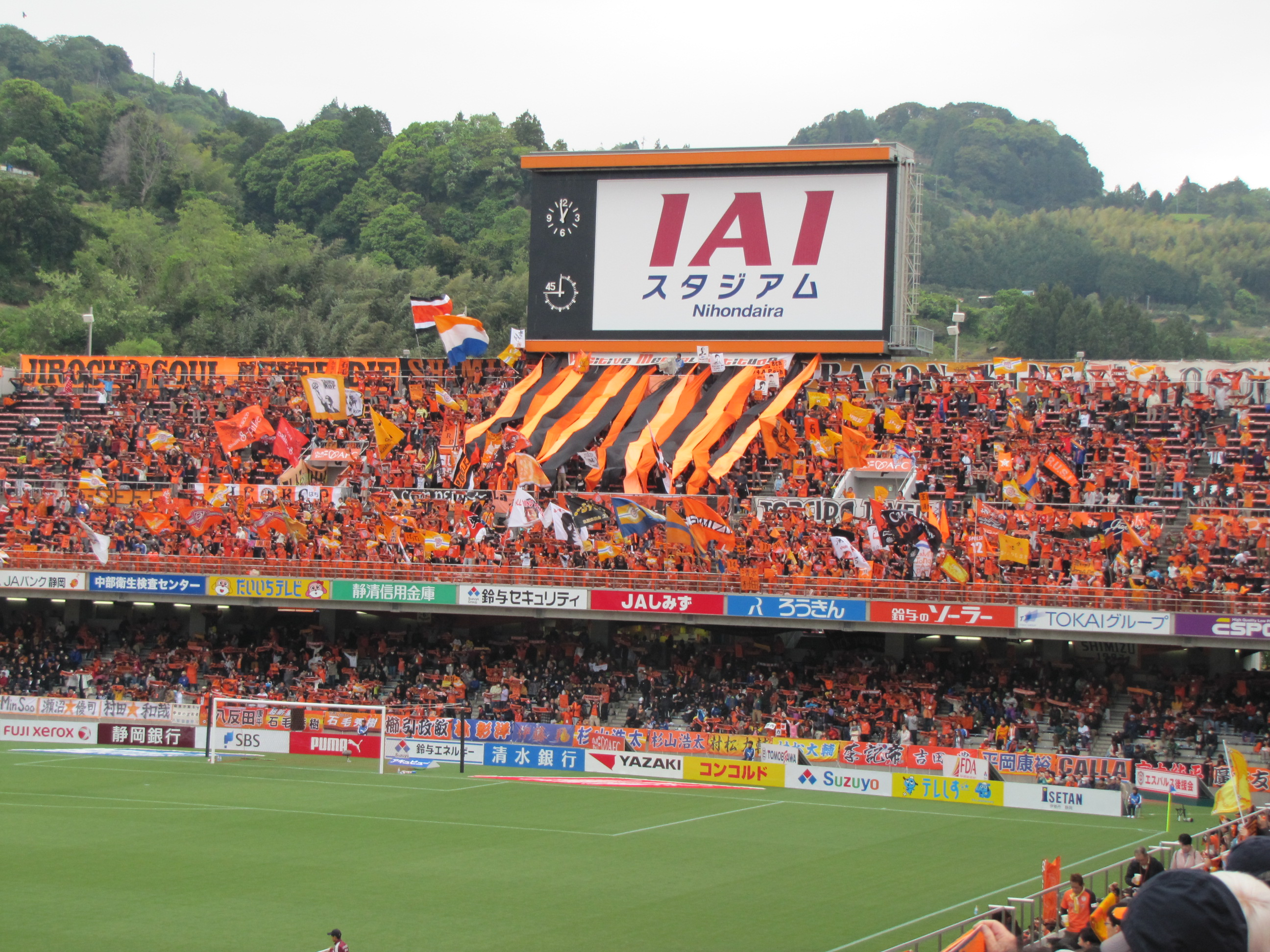
The home end before a game in 2013

=== Naming rights ===
In October 2008 it was announced that naming rights would be sold for Nihondaira Stadium. In late November 2008 a deal was announced which would rename the stadium Outsourcing Stadium Nihondaira. The contract will run for four years starting from the 2009 season, and would be worth 90 000 000 per year.

A new 5-year deal sponsorship deal with IAI Corporation, a manufacturer of industrial robots, took effect on 1 March 2013. The stadium was renamed IAI Stadium Nihondaira, shortened by the club and supporters to I Sta. This sponsorship deal was extended a further five years in 2018.

=== Future ===
After filling Nihondaira on average over 81% for league games in 2008, in November of the same year the club expressed its desire for the ground, which is owned by Shizuoka City, to have its capacity expanded.

In 2020 the club restated their hope to build a new, larger home. In recent years various locations have been cited as a potential location for a new stadium, including next to Higashi-Shizuoka Station, and next to Shimizu Station.

=== Training ground ===
Located near the famous Miho no Matsubara are Shimizu's main training facilities. Named Miho Ground, training session are sometimes open to the public for autograph hunters. The Miho Ground has also housed the club offices since the club's foundation.

== Kit suppliers and shirt sponsors ==
=== Sponsors ===
Since the team's inception, the same colour combination for home shirts have been used each year. The colour scheme of orange shirts, shorts and socks was selected to reflect the famous local product of Shizuoka Prefecture; the mikan. The current bright orange hue, named S-Pulse Orange by the club, is the result of a gentle evolution from a more yellow/orange shade during the team's early years. At the advent of the J.League, Shimizu were the only top division club in the country to wear orange, a distinction which is now shared with other top flight mainstays, such as Albirex Niigata and Omiya Ardija. There is currently no third kit. Goalkeeping colours have changed more over the seasons, with the current first choice kit all black, and all green being the second choice.

Kit manufacturers have been exclusively Puma since 1997, and prior to this was shared with Mizuno. Shirt sponsors have been fairly consistent over the team's sixteen-year history (see table below). The team's current main shirt sponsor is the local Suzuyo Group, with additional sponsorship panels on the lower neck and arms from confectionery company Glico, and Japan Airlines, respectively.

Year	Kit manufacturer	Main sponsor
1992–1996	(Japan) Mizuno	Japan Airlines
1997–2006	(Germany) Puma	Japan Airlines
2006–present	(Germany) Puma	(Japan) Suzuyo

=== Kit evolution ===
Home kit - 1st (Japan) Mizuno (1993–1996), (Germany) Puma (1997–present)
1992	1993 - 1996	1997 - 1998	1999 - 2001	2002 - 2004
2005 - 2006	2007	2008	2009	2010
2011	2012	2013	2014	2015
2016	2017	2018	2019	2020
2021	2022	2023	2024	2025
2026 -

Away kit - 2nd
1992	1993	1994 - 1996	1997 - 1998	1999 - 2001
2002 - 2004	2005 - 2006	2007	2008	2009
2010	2011	2012	2013	2014
2015	2016	2017	2018	2019
2020	2021	2022	2023	2024
2025	2026 -			

Third kit - Other
1992 - 1996; Cup 1st	1992 - 1996; Cup 2nd	2016; Super De S Series	2017; Super De S Series	2018; Limited
2019; 120th anniversary of the opening of Shimizu port	2020; Limited	2021; Limited	2022 3rd	2022; 30th Anniversary
2023 3rd	2023; Limited	2024; Limited	2025; Limited	

=== Crest ===
From the club's formation up to 1996, the club used an earlier version of the team crest. while different, the previous design featured the same central lettering as the present badge. Unveiled for the 1997 season, the current team crest was designed around a globe to reflect the club's ambitions as a world class professional team. The head of the badge takes the iconic shape of Mount Fuji's perfect cone to symbolise the team's representation of Shizuoka; the home of Mount Fuji. The choice of blue to accompany the team's orange evokes Shimizu's history as an industrial port town and its proximity to the sea of Suruga Bay. The team crest differs from the team logo which is often used to represent the club. The logo uses the central lettering from the crest, an example of which being the club's shop sign.

Club mascot Palchan and co performing at the 2007 All Star game.

=== Mascot ===
Named Palchan and sporting big, winglike ears, S-Pulse's mascot supports the team and entertains fans by performing choreographed, and often acrobatic, dance routines during the buildup to home games. He often performs with the help of his two younger siblings. Designed by professional cartoonist Guy Gilchrist, Palchan's name is taken from the English pal and the pul of S-Pulse. The suffix chan is an affectionate title commonly used in Japan. Sporting team number zero, Palchan goods are a consistent best seller with various merchandise available. S-Pulse also have a cheer leading team named Orange Wave. The team perform routines prior to kick off and half time as well as making various appearances at S-Pulse themed events in and around Shizuoka.

== Players ==
=== Current squad ===
As of 17 September 2026.

Note: Flags indicate national team as defined under FIFA eligibility rules; some limited exceptions apply. Players may hold more than one non-FIFA nationality.

No.	Pos.	Nation	Player
1	GK	JPN	Yuya Oki
2	MF	BRA	Dieguinho
3	DF	JPN	Yuji Takahashi
4	DF	JPN	Sodai Hasukawa
6	MF	KOR	Won Du-jae
7	MF	BRA	Capixaba
8	MF	JPN	Kenta Inoue
9	FW	KOR	Oh Se-hun
13	FW	JPN	Ryo Germain
14	DF	KOR	Park Seung-wook
15	DF	JPN	Yuki Honda
16	GK	JPN	Togo Umeda
17	MF	JPN	Masaki Yumiba
18	MF	JPN	Taiki Hirato
19	FW	JPN	Kosuke Kinoshita
20	DF	KOR	Um Joo-young
21	MF	JPN	Kai Matsuzaki
22	GK	JPN	Kei Ishikawa
24	DF	JPN	Hidehiro Sugai

No.	Pos.	Nation	Player
25	DF	BRA	Mateus Brunetti
27	MF	JPN	Ryota Hariu
28	DF	JPN	Yutaka Yoshida
30	GK	JPN	Tomotaro Sasaki
33	MF	JPN	Yuji Doi
33	MF	JPN	Shun Tatemi ^{Type 2}
36	DF	JPN	Narumu Ono ^{DSP}
37	MF	JPN	Kei Koizumi
38	MF	JPN	Yuto Tsuji
39	DF	JPN	Haruto Hidaka
41	MF	JPN	Keigo Suzuki
47	MF	JPN	Yudai Shimamoto
49	FW	JPN	Koya Kitagawa
50	MF	JPN	Tomoya Fujii
51	DF	JPN	Jelani Reshaun Sumiyoshi
70	DF	JPN	Sen Takagi
71	GK	JPN	Yui Inokoshi
81	MF	JPN	Kazuki Kozuka
97	MF	JPN	Rinsei Ohata

=== Out on loan ===
Note: Flags indicate national team as defined under FIFA eligibility rules; some limited exceptions apply. Players may hold more than one non-FIFA nationality.

No.	Pos.	Nation	Player
—	DF	JPN	Kengo Kitazume (at Matsumoto Yamaga FC)
—	FW	JPN	Riku Gunji (at Renofa Yamaguchi FC)
—	FW	JPN	Aoi Ando (at Yokogawa Musashino)

No.	Pos.	Nation	Player
—	MF	JPN	Motoki Nishihara (at Mito HollyHock)
—	MF	JPN	Sean Kotake (at Thespa Gunma)
—	FW	BRA	Vini Peixoto (at Hokkaido Consadole Sapporo)

== Management and staff ==
For the 2026 season.

Position	Name
Manager	(Japan) Takayuki Yoshida
Assistant manager	(Japan) Mitsumasa Yoda
First-team coach	(Japan) Daisuke Ichikawa (Japan) Ichizo Nakata
Goalkeeper coach	(Japan) Masaaki Furukawa
Conditioning coach	(Japan) Ryo Nitta
Analyst	(Japan) Tomofumi Kuriyama
Chief doctor	(Japan) Mitsuhito Doi
Chief trainer	(Japan) Takayuki Nakayama
Physiologist	(Brazil) Felipe Olive
Physiotherapist	(Japan) Keisuke Ishihara
Trainer	(Japan) Ryuichiro Maezawa (Japan) Tomotaka Kato
Athletic trainer	(Japan) Ryohei Shimura
Interpreter (English / Portuguese)	(Japan) Daigo Terasaki (Japan) Kota Kurosu
Interpreter (Korean)	(South Korea) Kang In-yeop
Interpreter (Portuguese)	(Brazil) Luiz Uehara
Chief secretary	(Japan) Satoru Matsunaga
Secretary	(Japan) Takahiro Nishiyama (Japan) Kazuma Ishihara

== Honours ==
Type	Honours	Titles	Season
League	J2 League	1	2024
Cup	Emperor's Cup	1	2001
Cup	J.League Cup	1	1996
Cup	Japanese Super Cup	2	2001, 2002
Continental	Asian Cup Winners' Cup	1	1999–00

Bold is for those competition that are currently active.

== Records and statistics ==
As of 26 March 2026.

Top 10 all-time appearances
Rank	Player	Years	Club appearance
1	(Japan) Teruyoshi Itō	1993–2010	603
2	(Japan) Masaaki Sawanobori	1992–2005	482
3	(Japan) Daisuke Ichikawa	1997–2010	416
4	(Japan) Ryuzo Morioka	1995–2006	357
5	(Japan) Katsumi Oenoki	1992–2002	326
6	(Japan) Takuma Edamura	2005–2018	325
7	(Japan) Masanori Sanada	1992–2004	319
8	(Japan) Toshihide Saito	1996–2006	310
9	(Japan) Yosuke Kawai	2010–2021	298
10	(Japan) Ryō Takeuchi	2009–2023	288

As of 26 March 2026.

Top 10 all-time goalscorer
Rank	Player	Club appearance	Total goals
1	(Japan) Masaaki Sawanobori	482	106
2	(Japan) Genki Omae	248	84
3	(Japan) Koya Kitagawa	274	70
4	(Japan) Alex	250	67
5	(Japan) Kenta Hasegawa	256	57
7	(Argentina) Fernando Oliva	101	53
7	(South Korea) Cho Jae-Jin	122	53
10	(North Korea) Jong Tae-se	127	49
10	(Japan) Shinji Okazaki	154	49
10	(Japan) Takuma Edamura	325	49

- Biggest wins: 9–0 vs Mitsubishi Nagasaki (12 June 2024)
- Heaviest defeats: 0–8 vs Hokkaido Consadole Sapporo (17 June 2019)
- Youngest ever debutant: Ryunosuke Yada ~ 16 years 6 months 6 days old (On 5 April 2023 vs Shonan Bellmare)
- Oldest ever player: (Brazil) Santos ~ 40 years 23 days old (On 1 January 2001 vs Kashima Antlers)
- Youngest goal scorers: Motoki Nishihara ~ 17 years 4 months 4 days old (On 20 April 2024 vs Vegalta Sendai)
- Oldest goal scorers: (Brazil) Santos ~ 40 years 1 days old (On 10 December 2000 vs FC Kariya)

== Award winners ==
- J.League Player of the Year:

- (Brazil) Alex (1999)

- J.League Top Scorer:

- (Brazil) Thiago Santana (2022)

- J.League Best XI
- J1 League
  - (Japan) Takumi Horiike (1993)
  - (Japan) Masanori Sanada (1999)
  - (Japan) Toshihide Saito (1999)
  - (Japan) Ryuzo Morioka (1999)
  - (Japan) Masaaki Sawanobori (1999)
  - (Japan) Teruyoshi Ito (1999)
  - (Brazil) Alex (1999)
  - (Japan) Shinji Okazaki (2009)
  - (Japan) Jungo Fujimoto (2010)
  - (Brazil) Thiago Santana (2022)
- J2 League
  - (Japan) Shūichi Gonda (2023)
  - (Japan) Yoshinori Suzuki (2023)
  - (Japan) Takashi Inui (2023, 2024)
  - (Japan) Reon Yamahara (2024)
  - (United States) Jelani Reshaun Sumiyoshi (2024)
- J.League Best Young Player:

- (Japan) Masaaki Sawanobori (1993)
- (Japan) Toshihide Saito (1996)
- (Japan) Jungo Fujimoto (2006)

- Individual Fair Play Award:
  - (Japan) Shohei Ikeda (2003)
  - (Japan) Teruyoshi Itō (2007)
  - (Japan) Kosuke Ota (2011)
  - (Japan) Yasuhiro Hiraoka (2014)
- J.League Manager of the Year:

- (Argentina) Osvaldo Ardiles (1998)
- (England) Steve Perryman (1999)

- J2 League Top Scorer:
  - (North Korea) Jong Tae-se (2016)

== Former players ==
Players who have been named Player of the Year or Young Player of the Year in the J.League:

Japan

- (Japan) Alex
- (Japan) Jungo Fujimoto
- (Japan) Kenta Hasegawa
- (Japan) Daisuke Ichikawa
- (Japan) Teruyoshi Ito
- (Japan) Ryuzo Morioka
- (Japan) Shinji Okazaki
- (Japan) Shinji Ono
- (Japan) Toshihide Saito
- (Japan) Masaaki Sawanobori
- (Japan) Naohiro Takahara
- (Japan) Kazuaki Tasaka
- (Japan) Kazuyuki Toda

AFC/OFC/CAF

- (Australia) Alex Brosque
- (Australia) Eddy Bosnar
- (North Korea) Jong Tae-se
- (North Korea) Kang Song-ho
- (South Korea) Ahn Jung-Hwan
- (South Korea) Cho Jae-Jin
- (South Korea) Choi Tae-uk
- (South Korea) Kim Dong-sub
- (South Korea) Kim Hyun-sung
- (South Korea) Lee Ki-je
- (Thailand) Teerasil Dangda

CONMEBOL

- (Argentina) Fernando Oliva
- (Brazil) Alair
- (Brazil) Alexandre
- (Brazil) Anderson
- (Brazil) Araújo
- (Brazil) Baré
- (Brazil) Baron
- (Brazil) Dias
- (Brazil) Djalminha
- (Brazil) Fabinho
- (Brazil) Fernandinho
- (Brazil) Gomes
- (Brazil) Paulo Jamelli
- (Brazil) Juninho
- (Brazil) Jymmy Dougllas
- (Brazil) Marcelo
- (Brazil) Marco
- (Brazil) Marcos Aurélio
- (Brazil) Marcos Paulo
- (Brazil) Marquinhos
- (Brazil) Mirandinha
- (Brazil) Rogério Corrêa
- (Brazil) Ronaldão
- (Brazil) Santos
- (Brazil) Sidmar
- (Brazil) Toninho
- (Brazil) Tuto

UEFA

- (Bosnia and Herzegovina) Srđan Pecelj
- (Croatia) Igor Cvitanović
- (England) Stuart Thurgood
- (Italy) Daniele Massaro
- (Montenegro) Dženan Radončić
- (Norway) Frode Johnsen
- (Slovenia) Milivoje Novaković
- (Sweden) Freddie Ljungberg
- (Wales) Mark Bowen
- (Bulgaria) Ahmed Ahmedov

=== FIFA World Cup players ===
1994 FIFA World Cup

- (Brazil) Ronaldão

1998 FIFA World Cup

- (Japan) Teruyoshi Itō
- (Japan) Toshihide Saito

2002 FIFA World Cup

- (Japan) Daisuke Ichikawa
- (Japan) Ryuzo Morioka
- (Japan) Alex
- (Japan) Kazuyuki Toda

2006 FIFA World Cup

- (South Korea) Cho Jae-jin

2010 FIFA World Cup

- (Japan) Shinji Okazaki

== Managerial history ==
Manager	Tenure		Honours
Manager	Start	Finish	Honours
(Brazil) Émerson Leão	1 January 1992	30 June 1994	
(Brazil) Rivellino	1 July 1994	31 January 1995	
(Japan) Masakatsu Miyamoto	1 February 1995	31 January 1996	
(Argentina) Osvaldo Ardiles	1 February 1996	31 January 1999	– 1996 J.League Cup
(England) Steve Perryman	1 February 2000	31 January 2001	– 1999–00 Asian Cup Winners' Cup
(Federal Republic of Yugoslavia) Zdravko Zemunović	15 December 2000	31 January 2003	– 2001 Emperor's Cup – 2001 Japanese Super Cup – 2002 Japanese Super Cup
(Japan) Takeshi Oki	1 February 2003	30 November 2003	
(Japan) Koji Gyotoku	1 December 2003	31 January 2004	
(Brazil) Antoninho	1 February 2004	7 September 2004	
(Japan) Nobuhiro Ishizaki	26 June 2004	28 November 2004	
(Japan) Kenta Hasegawa	1 January 2005	31 December 2010	
(Iran) Afshin Ghotbi	1 February 2011	30 July 2014	
(Japan) Katsumi Oenoki	30 July 2014	1 August 2015	
(Japan) Kazuaki Tasaka	1 August 2015	31 December 2015	
(Japan) Shinji Kobayashi	1 January 2016	31 December 2017	
(Sweden) Jan Jönsson	1 January 2018	14 May 2019	
(Japan) Yoshiyuki Shinoda	1 January 2016	14 December 2019	
(Australia) Peter Cklamovski	31 December 2019	November 2020	
(Spain) Miguel Ángel Lotina	1 February 2021	3 November 2021	
(Japan) Hiroaki Hiraoka	4 November 2021	30 May 2022	
(Japan) Yoshiyuki Shinoda (caretaker)	31 May 2022	6 June 2022	
(Brazil) Zé Ricardo	7 June 2022	3 April 2023	
(Japan) Tadahiro Akiba	3 April 2023	6 January 2026	– 2024 J2 League
(Japan) Takayuki Yoshida	7 January 2026	current	

== Season by season record ==
Champions	Runners-up	Third place	Promoted	Relegated

Season	Div.	Teams	Pos.	Attendance/G	J.League Cup	Emperor's Cup	Asia	
1992					Runners-up	Quarter final		
1993	J1	10	3rd	18,462	Runners-up	Semi-finals		
1994	J1	12	4th	19,726	1st round	1st round		
1995	J1	14	9th	19,747		1st round		
1996	J1	16	10th	12,962	Winner	Quarter-finals		
1997	J1	17	5th	9,888	Group stage	Quarter-finals		
1998	J1	18	3rd	12,298	Semi-final	Runners-up		
1999	J1	16	2nd	12,883	Quarter-finals	Quarter-finals		
2000	J1	16	8th	12,422	Quarter-finals	Runners-up	CWC	Winner
2001	J1	16	4th	15,973	2nd round	Winner	CWC	3rd place
2002	J1	16	8th	14,963	Semi-finals	Quarter-finals	CWC	Quarter-finals
2003	J1	16	11th	16,284	Semi-finals	Semi-finals	CL	Group stage
2004	J1	16	14th	13,568	Quarter-finals	4th round	-	-
2005	J1	18	15th	12,752	Quarter-finals	Runners-up	-	-
2006	J1	18	4th	14,302	Group stage	Quarter-finals	-	-
2007	J1	18	4th	15,952	Group stage	Quarter-finals	-	-
2008	J1	18	5th	16,599	Runners-up	Quarter-finals	-	-
2009	J1	18	7th	17,935	Semi-finals	Semi-finals	-	-
2010	J1	18	6th	18,001	Semi-finals	Runners-up	-	-
2011	J1	18	10th	15,801	Semi-finals	Quarter-finals	-	-
2012	J1	18	9th	15,121	Runners-up	4th round	-	-
2013	J1	18	9th	14,137	Group stage	4th round	-	-
2014	J1	18	15th	14,210	Group stage	Semi-finals	-	-
2015	J1	18	17th	14,083	Group stage	2nd round	-	-
2016	J2	22	2nd	11,274	Not eligible	Round of 16	-	-
2017	J1	18	14th	15,116	Group stage	Round of 16	-	-
2018	J1	18	8th	14,671	Group stage	3rd round	-	-
2019	J1	18	12th	15,043	Group stage	Semi-finals	-	-
2020 †	J1	18	16th	5,235	Group stage	Did not qualify	-	-
2021 †	J1	20	14th	7,454	Play-off stage	4th round	-	-
2022	J1	18	17th	15,256	Group stage	3rd round	-	-
2023	J2	22	4th	14,393	Group stage	2nd round	-	-
2024	J2	20	1st	17,750	2nd round	3rd round	-	-
2025	J1	20	7th	18,803	2nd round	TBD	-	-
2026	J1	10	TBD		N/A	N/A	-	-
2026-27	J1	20	TBD		TBD	TBD	-	-

Key

- Pos. = Position in league
- Attendance/G = Average home league attendance
- † 2020 & 2021 season's attendances reduced by COVID-19 worldwide pandemic
- Source: J.League Data Site

== League history ==
- Division 1 (J1 League) : 1993–2015
- Division 2 (J2 League) : 2016
- Division 1 (J1 League) : 2017–2022
- Division 2 (J2 League) : 2023–2024
- Division 1 (J1 League) : 2025–

== Notes ==
Sporting positions
Preceded by Kashima Antlers	Emperor's Cup Winners; 2001	Succeeded by Kyoto Purple Sanga
Preceded by Verdy Kawasaki	J.League Cup Winners; 1996	Succeeded by Kashima Antlers
Preceded by Nagoya Grampus Eight	Japanese Super Cup Winners; 2001–2002	Succeeded by Kyoto Purple Sanga
Preceded by Al-Shabab (Saudi Arabia)	Asian Cup Winners' Cup Winners; 2000	Succeeded by Al-Ittihad (Saudi Arabia)
