= CA14 =

CA14 may refer to:

- California's 14th congressional district
- California State Route 14
- Carbonic anhydrase 14, encoded by the CA14 gene
- CAC CA-14 Boomerang, an Australian fighter aircraft
- Shimizu Station (Shizuoka), a railway station in Shimizu-ku, Shizuoka City, Japan (station code: CA14)
