= W. S. Merwin bibliography =

A list of works by or about William Stanley Merwin (September 30, 1927 – March 15, 2019). Merwin was an American poet, credited with over fifty books of poetry, translation and prose.

== Poetry ==
Collections

- 1952: A Mask for Janus, New Haven, Connecticut: Yale University Press; awarded the Yale Younger Poets Prize, 1952 (reprinted as part of The First Four Books of Poems, 1975)
- 1954: The Dancing Bears, New Haven, Connecticut: Yale University Press (reprinted as part of The First Four Books of Poems, 1975)
- 1956: Green with Beasts, New York: Knopf (reprinted as part of The First Four Books of Poems, 1975)
- 1960: The Drunk in the Furnace, New York: Macmillan (reprinted as part of The First Four Books of Poems, 1975)
- 1963: The Moving Target, New York: Atheneum
- 1966: Collected Poems, New York: Atheneum
- 1967: The Lice, New York: Atheneum; (reprinted in 2017, Port Townsend, Washington: Copper Canyon Press)
- 1969: Animae, San Francisco: Kayak
- 1970: The Carrier of Ladders, New York: Atheneum – winner of the Pulitzer Prize
- 1970: Signs, illustrated by A. D. Moore; Iowa City, Iowa: Stone Wall Press
- 1973: Writings to an Unfinished Accompaniment, New York: Atheneum
- 1975: The First Four Books of Poems, containing A Mask for Janus, The Dancing Bears, Green with Beasts, and The Drunk in the Furnace, New York: Atheneum; (reprinted in 2000, Port Townsend, Washington: Copper Canyon Press)
- 1977: The Compass Flower, New York: Atheneum
- 1978: Feathers From the Hill, Iowa City, Iowa: Windhover
- 1982: Finding the Islands, San Francisco: North Point Press
- 1983: Opening the Hand, New York: Atheneum
- 1988: The Rain in the Trees, New York: Knopf
- 1988: Selected Poems, New York: Atheneum. Selected for inclusion in Harold Bloom's Western Canon.
- 1993: The Second Four Books of Poems, Port Townsend, Washington: Copper Canyon Press
- 1993: Travels: Poems, New York: Knopf – winner of the 1993 Lenore Marshall Poetry Prize
- 1996: The Vixen: Poems, New York: Knopf
- 1997: Flower and Hand: Poems, 1977–1983 Port Townsend, Washington: Copper Canyon Press
- 1998: The Folding Cliffs: A Narrative, a "novel-in-verse" New York: Knopf
- 1999: The River Sound: Poems, New York: Knopf
- 2001: The Pupil, New York: Knopf
- 2005: Migration: New and Selected Poems, Port Townsend, Washington: Copper Canyon Press – winner of the National Book Award for Poetry
- 2005: Present Company, Port Townsend, Washington: Copper Canyon Press
- 2005: Selected Poems, Tarset, Northumberland, UK: Bloodaxe Books
- 2008: The Shadow of Sirius, Port Townsend, Washington: Copper Canyon Press – winner of the Pulitzer Prize; 2009: Tarset, Northumberland, UK: Bloodaxe Books
- 2013: The Collected Poems of W. S. Merwin, New York: Library of America
- 2014: The Moon Before Morning, Port Townsend, Washington: Copper Canyon Press; Hexham, Northumberland, UK: Bloodaxe Books
- 2016: Garden Time, Port Townsend, Washington: Copper Canyon Press; Hexham, Northumberland, UK: Bloodaxe Books
- 2017: The Essential W.S. Merwin, Port Townsend, Washington: Copper Canyon Press

List of poems

Title	Year	First published	Reprinted/collected
Alba	2008	The New Yorker 84/35 (November 3, 2008)	
The Blackboard	2014	The New Yorker 90/32 (October 20, 2014)	
Another Year Comes	1960		The New Yorker Book of Poems (1974)
The Asians Dying	1966		The New Yorker Book of Poems (1974)
Burning Mountain	1958		
Forgetting clouds	2014	The New Yorker (April 21, 2014)	
The Herds	1966		The New Yorker Book of Poems (1974)
Lemuels Blessing	1962		The New Yorker Book of Poems (1974)
The Old Room	1969		The New Yorker Book of Poems (1974)
Peril	1974	Merwin, W. S. (January 7, 1974). "Peril". The New Yorker. 49 (46): 36.	
Peasant	1967		The New Yorker Book of Poems (1974)
Plea for a Captive	1960		The New Yorker Book of Poems (1974)
The Portland (Going Out)	1957		The New Yorker Book of Poems (1974)
Resolution	1964		The New Yorker Book of Poems (1974)
Shadow Questions	2016	Garden Time (2016)	
Telephone ringing in the labyrinth	2012	The New York Review of Books 59/9 (May 24, 2012)	
The Way to the River	1962		The New Yorker Book of Poems (1974)
The Widow	1966		The New Yorker Book of Poems (1974)

== Prose ==
- 1970: The Miner's Pale Children, New York: Atheneum (reprinted in 1994, New York: Holt)
- 1977: Houses and Travellers, New York: Atheneum (reprinted in 1994, New York: Holt)
- 1982: Unframed Originals: Recollections
- 1982: Regions of memory : uncollected prose, 1949-82
- 1992: The Lost Uplands: Stories of Southwest France, New York: Knopf
- 2002: The Mays of Ventadorn, National Geographic Directions Series; Washington: National Geographic
- 2004: The Ends of the Earth, essays, Washington: Shoemaker & Hoard
- 2005: Summer Doorways: A Memoir
- 2007: The Book of Fables, Port Townsend, Washington: Copper Canyon Press

== Plays ==
- 1956: Darkling Child (with Dido Milroy), produced this year
- 1957: Favor Island, produced this year at Poets' Theatre in Cambridge, Massachusetts (broadcast in 1958 by Third Programme, British Broadcasting Corporation)
- 1961: The Gilded West, produced this year at Belgrade Theatre, Coventry, England

== Translations ==
- 1959: The Poem of the Cid, London: Dent (American edition, 1962, New York: New American Library)
- 1960: The Satires of Persius, Bloomington, Indiana: Indiana University Press
- 1961: Some Spanish Ballads, London: Abelard (American edition: Spanish Ballads, 1961, New York: Doubleday Anchor)
- 1962: The Life of Lazarillo de Tormes: His Fortunes and Adversities, a Spanish novella; New York: Doubleday Anchor
- 1963: The Song of Roland
- 1969: Selected Translations, 1948–1968, New York: Atheneum – winner of the PEN Translation Prize
- 1969: Twenty Love Poems and a Song of Despair, poems by Pablo Neruda; London: Jonathan Cape (reprinted in 2004 with an introduction by Christina Garcia, New York: Penguin Books)
- 1969: Products of the Perfected Civilization, Selected Writings of Chamfort, also author of the introduction; New York: Macmillan
- 1969: Voices: Selected Writings of Antonio Porchia, Chicago: Follett (reprinted in 1988 and 2003, Port Townsend, Washington: Copper Canyon Press)
- 1969: Transparence of the World, poems by Jean Follain, New York: Atheneum (reprinted in 2003, Port Townsend, Washington: Copper Canyon Press)
- 1971: "Eight Quechua Poems", The Hudson Review
- 1973: Asian Figures, New York: Atheneum
- 1974: Osip Mandelstam: Selected Poems (with Clarence Brown), New York: Oxford University Press (reprinted in 2004 as The Selected Poems of Osip Mandelstam, New York: New York Review of Books)
- 1977: Sanskrit Love Poetry (with J. Moussaieff Masson), New York: Columbia University Press (published in 1981 as Peacock's Egg: Love Poems from Ancient India, San Francisco: North Point Press)
- 1977: Vertical Poetry, poems by Roberto Juarroz; San Francisco: Kayak (reprinted in 1988; San Francisco: North Point Press)
- 1978: Euripides' Iphigeneia at Aulis (with George E. Dimock, Jr.), New York: Oxford University Press
- 1979: Selected Translations, 1968–1978, New York: Atheneum
- 1981: Robert the Devil, an anonymous French play; with an introduction by the translator; Iowa City, Iowa: Windhover
- 1985: Four French Plays, including Robert the Devil; The Rival of His Master and Turcaret by Alain-René Lesage; and The False Confessions by Pierre de Marivaux; New York: Atheneum
- 1985: From the Spanish Morning, consisting of Spanash Ballads by Lope de Rueda and Eufemia: The Life of Lazarillo de Torres (originally translated in Tulane Drama Review, December 1958); New York: Atheneum
- 1989: Sun at Midnight, poems by Musō Soseki (with Soiku Shigematsu)
- 1996: Pieces of Shadow: Selected Poems of Jaime Sabines
- 1998: East Window: The Asian Translations, translated poems from earlier collections, Port Townsend, Washington: Copper Canyon Press
- 2000: Purgatorio from The Divine Comedy of Dante; New York: Knopf
- 2002: Gawain and the Green Knight, a New Verse Translation, New York: Knopf; 2003: Tarset, Northumberland, UK: Bloodaxe Books
- 2013: Selected Translations, translated poems from 1948–2010, Port Townsend, Washington: Copper Canyon Press
- 2013: Collected Haiku of Yosa Buson, Port Townsend, Washington: Copper Canyon Press (with Takako Lento)
- 2013: Sun At Midnight, poems by Muso Soseki, Port Townsend, Washington: Copper Canyon Press (with Soiku Shigematsu) (updated and reissued)
- 2018: Purgatorio: A New Translation, from The Divine Comedy of Dante, Copper Canyon Press

== Editor ==
- 1961: West Wind: Supplement of American Poetry, London: Poetry Book Society
- 1996: Lament for the Makers: A Memorial Anthology (compiler), Washington: Counterpoint
