= Spirit turtle =

Creature from Chinese mythology

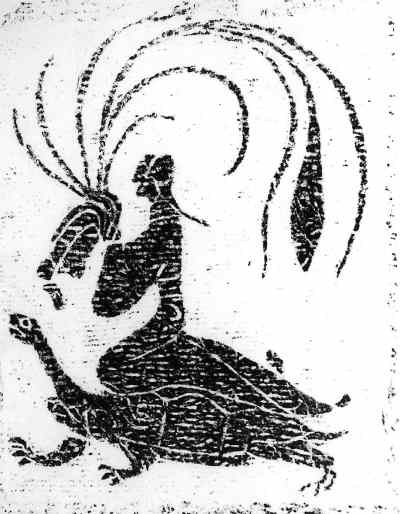
- An immortal riding a turtle, Han dynasty, Nanyang city, China

Chinese name
- Traditional Chinese: 靈龜
- Simplified Chinese: 灵龟
- Literal meaning: Spirit turtle
Transcriptions
Standard Mandarin
- Hanyu Pinyin: língguī
Middle Chinese
- Middle Chinese: /leŋ kˠiuɪ/
Old Chinese
- Zhengzhang: /*reːŋ kʷrɯ/

Vietnamese name
- Vietnamese alphabet: linh quy
- Chữ Nôm: 靈龜

Korean name
- Hangul: 영귀
- Hanja: 靈龜
Transcriptions
- Revised Romanization: yeonggwi
- McCune–Reischauer: yŏnggwi

Japanese name
- Kanji: 霊亀
- Hiragana: れいき
Transcriptions
- Romanization: reiki

The spirit turtle (Chinese: 靈龜) or spirit tortoise is a turtle originated from Chinese mythology and spread with East Asian cultural sphere. It is believed by East Asian cultures, like other turtles in mythology, to represent longevity (壽命).

It is said to be chief among all shelled creatures.

== Identification ==
Among the Four Intelligent Beasts (四靈), a list of auspicious animals, the turtle goes by several names. Although it can simply be called "turtle" (龜 guī), it is also referred to as "old turtle" (老龜 lǎoguī) and "spirit turtle" (靈龜 língguī). The latter is sometimes understood as being synonymous with "divine turtle" (神龜 shénguī) although distinctions are made.

The term is also used in reference to the turtle shells used in traditional divination.

== China ==
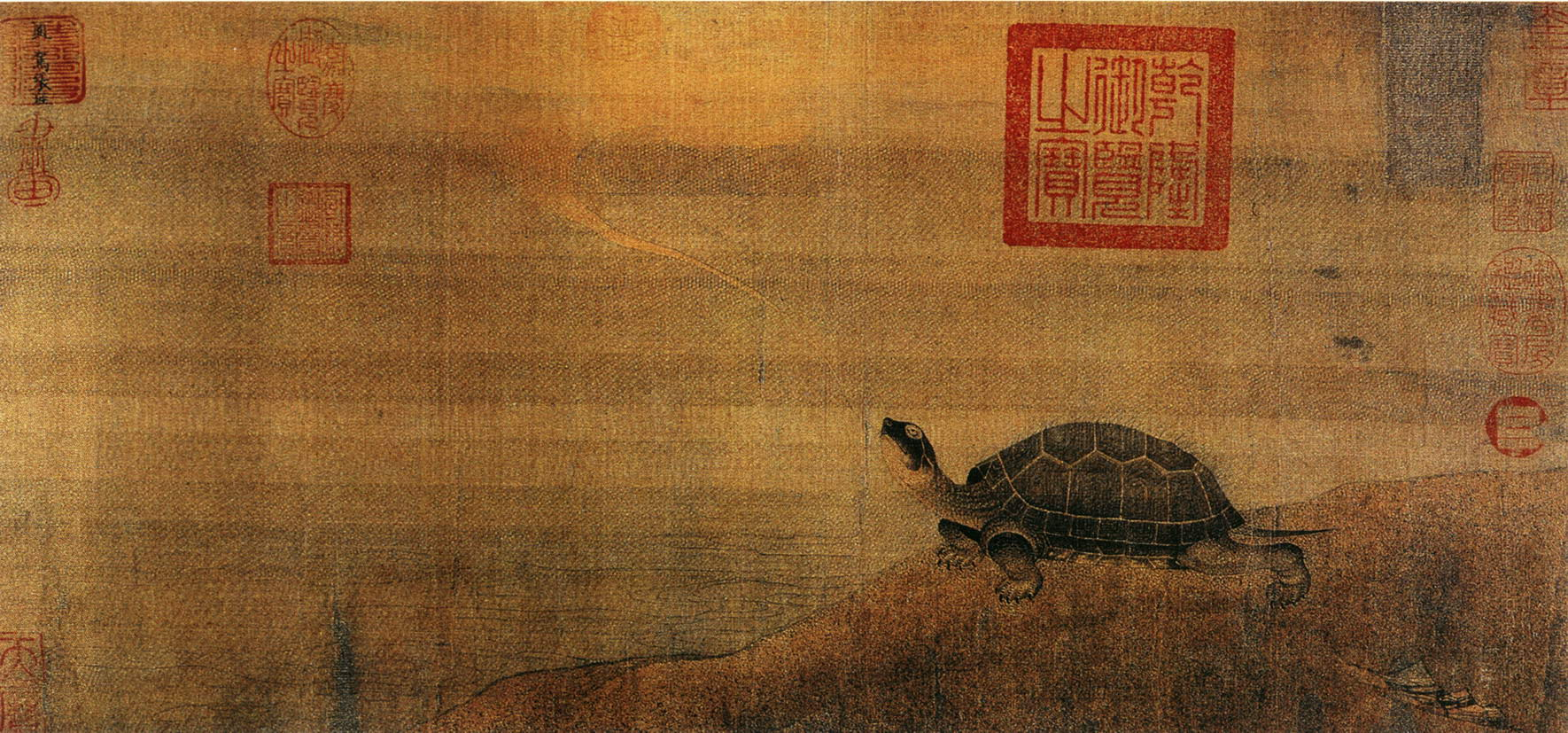
Zhang-Gui-Shen-gui-tu

The Erya provides entries on the terms "divine turtle" (神龜) and "spirit turtle" (靈龜). The former term includes an annotation which simply reads "the most sacred of turtles" (亀之最神明).

According to the Shuyiji (述異記 Tales of Strange Matters) compiled by Ren Fang, a turtle that has lived for one thousand years has grown hair, a five thousand year old tortoise is called a "divine turtle" (神龜) and an animal older than ten thousand years is called a "spiritual turtle" (靈龜).

The Baopuzi gives a slightly different account, describing the spirit turtle as one thousand years old. While the theme of longevity persists, the age at which the creature is recognized as a "spirit turtle" (靈龜) is in stark contrast with the account found in the Shuyiji. The text continues to describe the turtle as having five colors: blue, red, yellow, white, and black; together representing the five elements.

== Japan ==
In Japanese mythology, the creature is identified as the Reiki (霊亀 "spirit turtle").

The Zenrin-kushū provides a kōan that reads Reiki o o hiku (靈龜曵尾 "The spirit turtle sweeps its tail"). It is described as a variant of the phrase Ato o haratte ato shōzu (拂跡跡生 "Erasing traces creates traces").

The spirit turtle is an endemic motif at Shintō shrines and Buddhist temples in Japan. The sangō title "Reigizan" (霊亀山 "Spirit Turtle Mountain") belongs to several temples across the country, including Tenryū-ji and Rinsen-ji in Kyōto, Hontoku-ji in Himeji, Daichō-ji in Uwajima, and others.

It is said the Kameoka Hachimangū shrine in Sendai is so-called because a spirit turtle appeared at the time of its construction. Stone statues of the creature can be found at Zenyōmitsu-ji and Kameoka Hachimangū in Mashiko, Tochigi.

Reiki is also the name of the first era of the Nara period.

== Korea ==
In Korean mythology, it is known as Yeonggwi (Korean: 영귀; Hanja: 靈龜).

== See also ==
- Ao (turtle)
- Bixi
- Black Tortoise
- Cultural depictions of turtles
- Kashyapa
- World Turtle
