= Sōiku Shigematsu =

Japanese Buddhist priest (born 1943)

Shigematsu Sōiku at his home, 2010

Zen priest Shigematsu Sōiku during a "Zen Living" class at his temple

Sōiku Shigematsu (重松 宗育, Shigematsu Sōiku; born October 13, 1943) is a Japanese priest of Myoshin-ji branch of Rinzai School of Zen Buddhism, abbot of Shōgen-ji Temple in Shimizu-ku, Shizuoka, author and translator of books and essays on Zen that were instrumental in spreading interest in Zen literary tradition to the West in the latter half of the 20th century. Shigematsu taught English literature at Shizuoka University also visiting the United States on several occasions, most notably in 1985-6 as a Fulbright scholar. He won the Jerome J. Shestack Poetry Prize from The American Poetry Review in 1987.

== Early life, education, and academic career ==
Shigematsu Sōiku was born in the midst of World War II in the town of Shimizu. First son of Shigematsu Kijū (重松 輝宗; June 5, 1915 –), a Zen priest and accomplished calligrapher, he acquired the basic knowledge and experience of Zen life from his father. Notably, Kijū Shigematsu was also one of the teachers of Robert Aitken Rōshi, during the latter's training at Engaku-ji monastery.

Showing great interest in English language and literature Shigematsu entered Tokyo University of Foreign Studies in 1963 (grad. 1967), subsequently conducting graduate studies at Tokyo University and Kyoto University (grad. 1971) to later take up a professorship of English Literature at Shizuoka University (1975–2001). He also lectured and did research at Shizuoka Women's University (1972–75); San Diego State University and UC Davis (1986/Fulbright scholar), and Kansai Medical University (2001-7).

== Works and publications ==
Shigematsu's pioneering translation of the two most important Japanese collections of capping phrases or jakugo in Japanese - Zenrin-kushū 禅林句集 (tr. as A Zen Forest, Sayings of the Masters) and Zenrin Segoshū 禅林世語集 (tr. as A Zen Harvest, Japanese Folk Zen Sayings) - is acknowledged as the magnum opus of contemporary English-speaking Zen world. In addition, he also translated poetry and sermons of Musō Soseki and Zen haiku by Natsume Sōseki.

Based on the idea of anthologizing "worldly sayings" – insight-provoking expressions of regular people – collected in the above-mentioned second anthology, Zenrin Segoshū, Shigematsu's current project concentrates on creation of an anthology of Zen sayings from the native English literary and other sources. Parts of it have already been published by Shizuoka University's Studies in Humanities, e.g. "Zen Sayings" from R.W. Emerson (1985), Henry D. Thoreau, Walt Whitman, Ernest Hemingway, John Steinbeck, etc.

== Poetry ==
In addition to his Japanese - English translations of Zen poetry, Shigematsu Sōiku is a poet composing free verse in Japanese. A poem found in the recently published sixth volume of Shigematsu's poetry reads:

Japanese	English
プレゼント ベンツをもらっても私は喜ばない。 高価な衣をもらっても私は喜ばない。 たとえ一億円もらっても たぶん、いやきっと、喜ばないだろう。 これからも私の人生には無縁のものだ。 それよりも 「楽しみは 後ろに柱 前に酒 気に逢うた客 すりこ木の音」 最高の贈り物は 心の重荷を除いてくれる そんな自由な時間。	A Present I won't be glad if I receive a Benz. I won't be glad if I receive expensive clothes. Even if I receive a million dollars I won't be glad, perhaps... no I will not. From now on, too, all these have no connection to my life. Instead My joy is: Saké before me, Pillar behind to lean on, My best friend, Sound of miso grinding. The greatest present is free time like this, which lightens burdens of the heart.
