= 2002 Japanese Super Cup =

Kashima Antlers	Shimizu S-Pulse
1	1
- Date: February 23, 2002
- Venue: National Stadium, Tokyo
- Attendance: 34,576

2002 Japanese Super Cup was the Japanese Super Cup competition. The match was played at National Stadium in Tokyo on February 23, 2002. Shimizu S-Pulse won the championship.

== Match details ==
February 23, 2002
14:48

Kashima Antlers	1–1	Shimizu S-Pulse
Motoyama 67'	Report	Yokoyama 89'
Penalties
Fabiano (penalty scored); Honda (penalty scored); Akita (penalty missed); Ogasawara (penalty scored); Narahashi (penalty scored); Ikeuchi (penalty missed)	4–5	(penalty scored) Toda; (penalty scored) Ichikawa; (penalty scored) Baron; (penalty missed) Hiramatsu; (penalty scored) Alex; (penalty scored) Ikeda

National Stadium, Tokyo
Attendance: 34,576
Referee: Toru Kamikawa
