= Shimizukō Line =

- The remains of Tomoegawaguchi Station, April 2008

Overview
- Status: Abandoned
- Locale: Shizuoka, Japan
- Termini: Shimizu; Miho
- Stations: 6

History
- Opened: 1916
- Closed: 1984

Technical
- Line length: 8.3 km (5.2 mi)
- Track gauge: 1,067 mm (3 ft 6 in)

The Shimizukō Line (清水港線, Shimizukō-sen, literally "Shimizu Port Line") was a Japanese railway line in Shimizu-ku, Shizuoka, operated by Japanese National Railways. It ran as a branch line off the Tōkaidō Main Line from Shimizu Station, through the industrial port of Shimizu before terminating in the residential area of Miho. The line operated first as a freight line and later as a passenger line before closing in 1984 and being replaced by a bus service. At its peak, the line included a total of four passenger stations, and two spur lines used for freight services.

== Stations ==
- Shimizu
- Shimizukō (清水港駅)
- Shimizufutō (清水埠頭駅)
- Tomoegawaguchi (巴川口駅)
- Orido (折戸駅)
- Miho (三保駅)

== History ==
=== Background ===
Shimizu port had long been an important area for industry in the area. The areas natural harbour in Suruga Bay was a thriving fishing port and the export of the locally grown green tea. Miho is a busy residential area on the Shimizu peninsula famous for Miho no Matsubara. In an age before widespread bus or haulage services or personal transport, a train link into the area was conceived.

=== Industrial beginnings ===
The line began life on July 10, 1916, purely as an industrial railway from the then-named Ejiri Station into the industrial area of Shimizu port. The first stretch of the line ran as a 1.6 km spur to Shimizukō Station (清水港駅, Shimizukō eki, "Shimizu Port Station"). An extension on February 1, 1930, took the line deeper into the port district, with a station opening as Shimizufutō Station (清水埠頭駅, Shimizufutō eki, "Shimizu Pier Station") to further service the many export factories in the region. On December 1, 1934, Ejiri Station was renamed as Shimizu Station in part to reflect the growing influence the port had on the region's identity.

=== Passenger service ===
On July 1, 1944, the line was further extended a further 6 km into Miho, with the addition of four new stations: Tomoegawaguchi Station (巴川口駅, Tomoegawaguchi eki), Orido Station (折戸駅, Orido eki) and Miho Station (三保駅, Miho eki). This extension also included a new Shimizufutō Station opening 0.2 km back towards Shimizu Station, with the already existing platforms turned over purely to handle freight. On December 1 of the same year, all of the new stations began operating passenger services, and the line was officially named the Shimizukō Line.

=== Decline and closure ===
By the 1970s, passenger services had been reduced to meet only the needs of the morning and evening rush hour commuters and school students with only one roundtrip of passenger (mixed) trains a day. With increasing competition from buses and personal transport usage declined to the point that by the early 1980s the line was no longer considered a viable transport link. After forty years as a passenger service, the last Miho bound train departed Shimizu on March 31, 1984. The line officially closed for business on April 1 of the same year, its route being replaced by a bus service.

== Present day ==
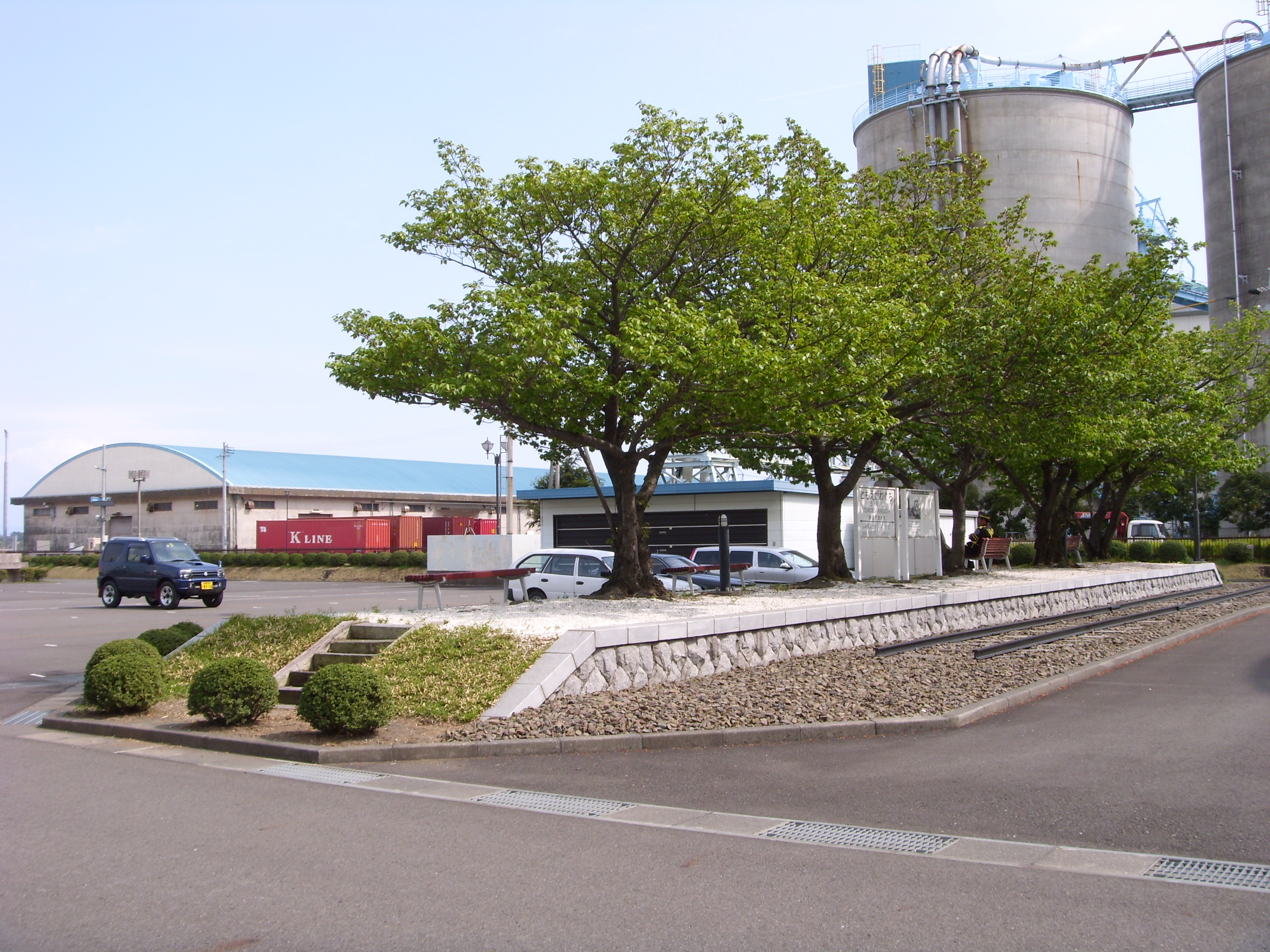
Tomoegawaguchi Station as seen in April 2008

Today the majority of the old route has been converted into pedestrian and cyclist walkway. Of the old stations, signals and rolling stock, remnants have been preserved to varying degrees. Shimizukō Station's industrial crane has been preserved and can be seen in the grounds of S-Pulse Dream Plaza, a shopping and entertainment complex on the station's former site.

The best preserved of the stations is Tomoegawaguchi, with a full platform and section of track complete with station signage still standing and today surrounded by a car park. Beyond Tomoegawaguchi, examples of the passenger trains and signals can be found on the 4 km cycle path and walkway which runs the path of the old rail road. Locations of old stations are marked with signs, and the area of and around Miho Station terminus has been converted into a park. The platform still stands along with a section of track with an example of one of the industrial trains which used to service the area's numerous factories.

The former railway is now a flower-lined route running through the heart of Shimizu. It is used daily by residents, tourists and the many students of the various local schools in the area.

== Photo gallery ==
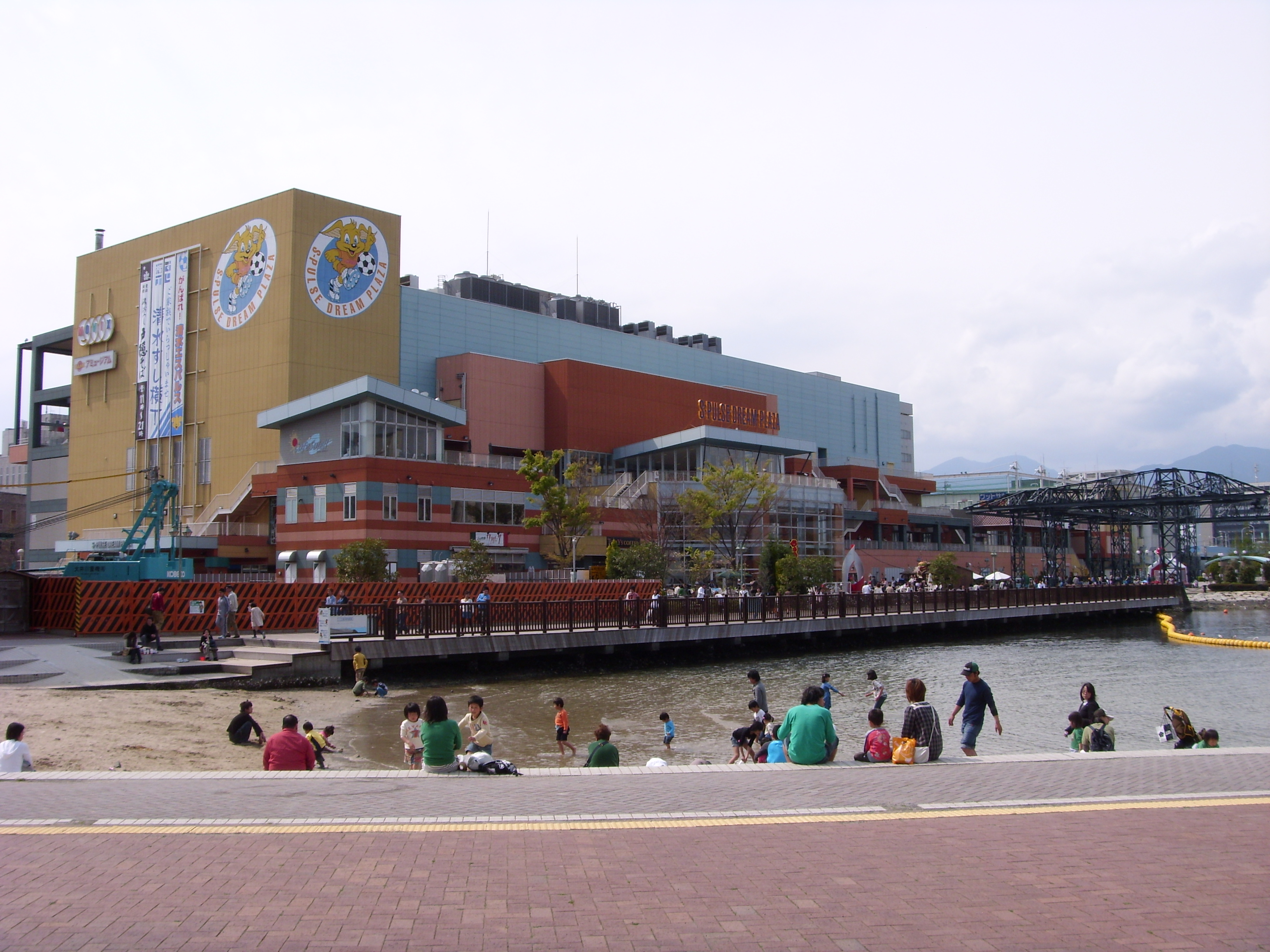
S-Pulse Dream Plaza stands on the site of the former Shimizukō Station. The station's industrial crane can be seen on the far right.

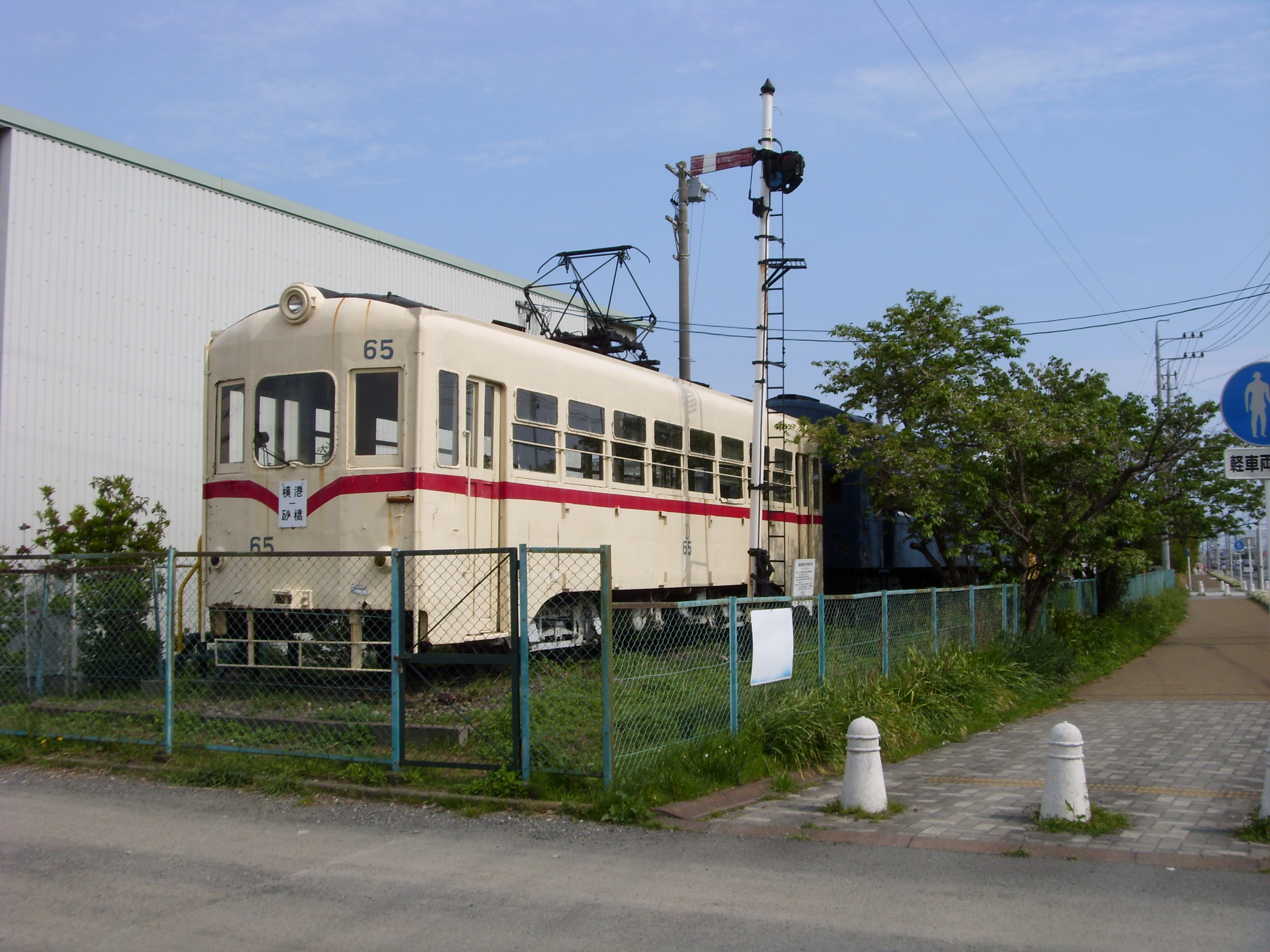
A small section of preserved track with train and signals

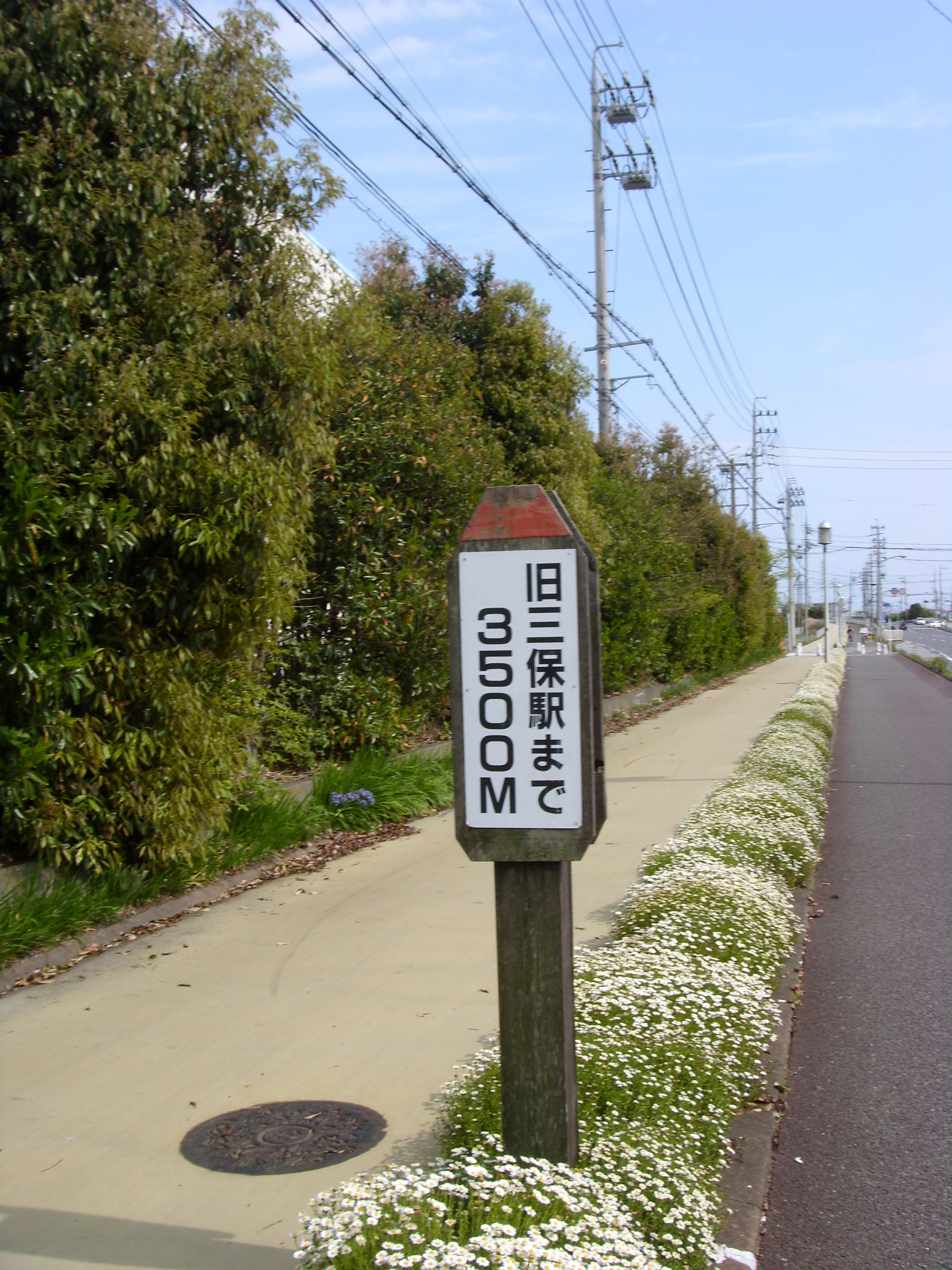
Sign on the present day pedestrian walkway reads "3500 meters to the former Miho Station."

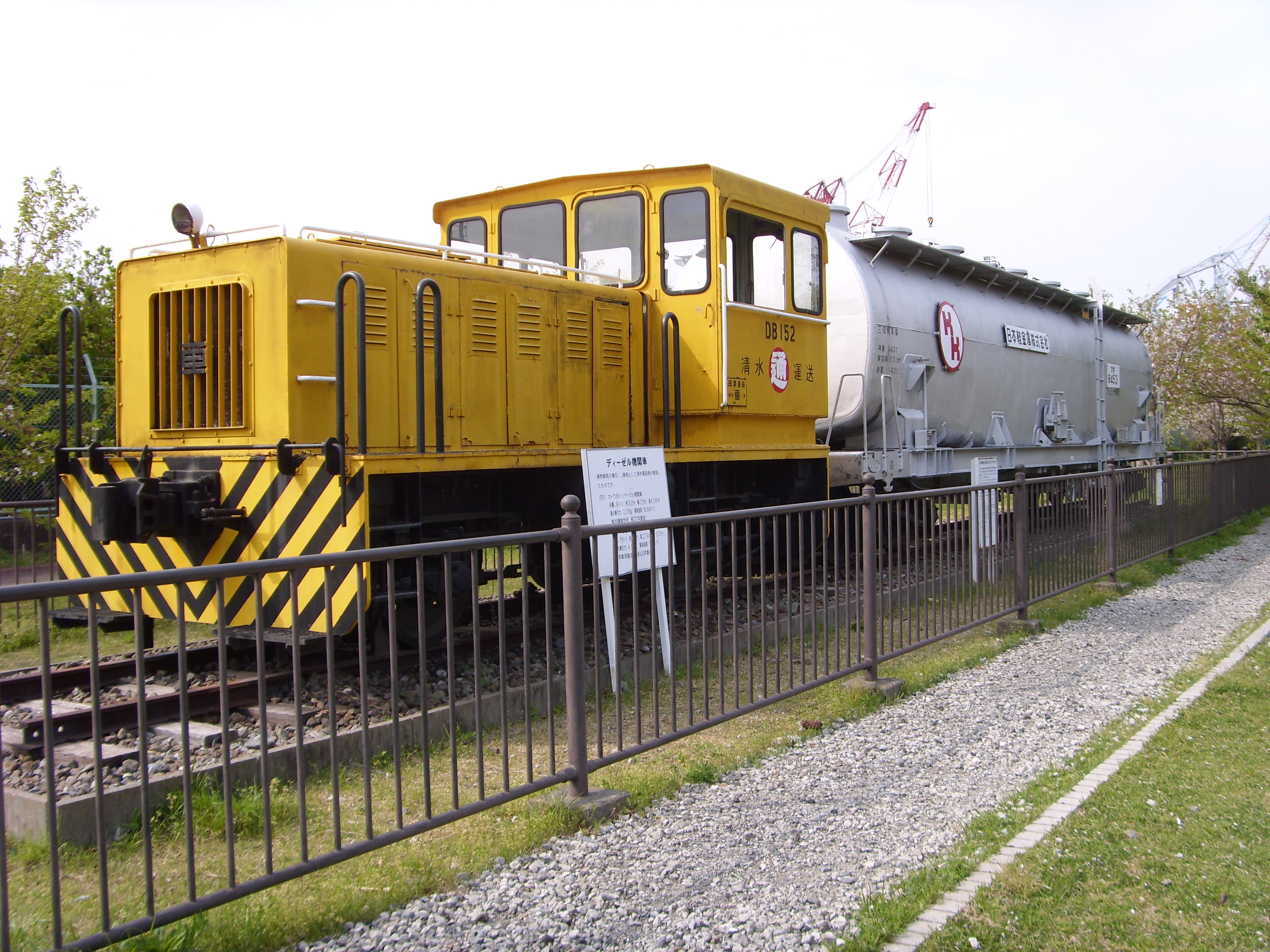
Rolling stock at present day Miho Station

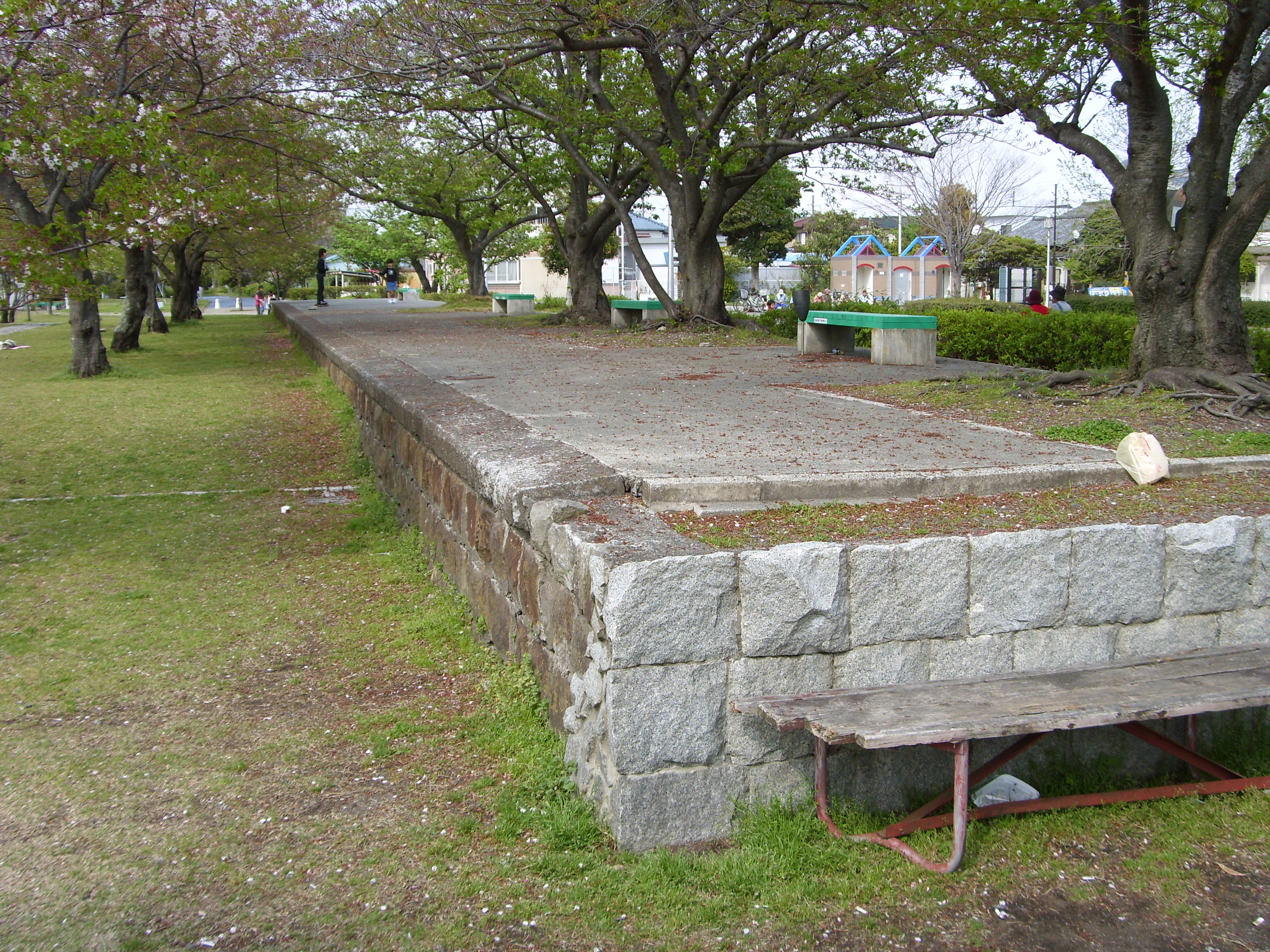
Miho Station terminus as seen in April 2008
