= Zenrin-kushū =

1688 Japanese collection of writings

- Author: Tōyō Eichi
- Original title: 禪林句集
- Language: Japanese, Chinese
- Genre: Philosophy
- Publication date: 1688
- Publication place: Japan (Muromachi)
- Media type: Book

Zenrin-kushū (禪林句集, meaning "Anthology of Passages from the Forests of Zen") is a collection of writings used in the Rinzai school of Zen. Initially it was a compilation of Zen writings by Tōyō Eichō (東陽榮朝, 1428–1504) a disciple of Kanzan Egen of the Myōshin-ji line of Rinzai school in Kyoto, Japan. Tōyō's anthology consisted of 5,000 writings compiled from writings of various traditions, such as Confucianism, Taoism and Zen, and the poetry of Tang and Song China.

== Sources used ==
The original sources include the Blue Cliff Record, The Gateless Gate, the Sutras, The Analects, The Great Learning, The Doctrine of the Mean, writings by Mencius, Laozi and Zhuang Zhou, and the poetry of Hanshan, Tao Yuanming, Du Fu, Li Bai, and Bai Juyi, among others. Tōyō arranged the writings in order of length, from single- to eight-character expressions, interspersing parallel verses of five through eight characters.

== Expanded version ==
This was known as the Ku Zōshi (The Phrase Book), and circulated in manuscript form until the 17th century, when Ijūshi published for the first time in 1688 an expanded version of the book, titled Zenrin-kushū. It is known that at least since the time of Hakuin Ekaku (1685-1788) the Zenrin-kushū has been used as part of the kōan practice, as the jakugo or capping verses — responses by students to problems given to them by their teachers.

== See also ==
Zen
Kōan
Jakugo
Classical Chinese poetry

== Bibliography ==
- Baroni, Helen Josephine (2002). The Illustrated Encyclopedia of Zen Buddhism. The Rosen Publishing Group. ISBN 0-82392-240-5.
- Blyth, Reginald Horace (1981). Haiku: Volume 1 Eastern Culture. Tokyo, Japan: Hokuseido Press. ISBN 0-89346-184-9.
- Heine, Steven; Wright, Dale S. (November 2005). Zen Classics: Formative Texts in the History of Zen Buddhism. Oxford University Press. ISBN 0195175255.
- Hori, Victor Sōgen (July 2010). Zen Sand: The Book of Capping Phrases for Koan Practice. University of Hawaii Press. ISBN 978-0824835071.
- Shigematsu, Sōiku (1981). A Zen Forest, Sayings of the Masters. Tokyo, Japan: Weatherhill. ISBN 0-8348-0159-0.
- Miura, Isshu; Fuller Sasaki, Ruth (2015). Zen Dust: The History of the Koan and Koan Study in Rinzai (Linji) Zen (Rev. ed.). Quirin Press. ISBN 978-1922169129.
- Lewis, Zenrin (July 1996). The Book of the Zen Grove (2nd ed.). Zen Sangha Press. ISBN 0965149935.
