= Jakugo =

Jakugo (着語, capping phrase), or agyo (下語) of a kōan is a proof of solution of the case riddle, but not the solution itself. In Zen Buddhism, kōan is used both as a meditation device and as an expression of Enlightenment (悟り/覚り, satori) – a radical experiential insight into the nature of things and the self alike. A capping phrase is supposedly an articulation of such enlightening experience, most of the time in verse. According to Victor Sōgen Hori the use of jakugo dates to the Song dynasty (AD 960 - 1270) and was developed from classical Chinese "literary games".

V. Sōgen Hori describes the process of the kōan training as follows: "Rinzai monasteries in Japan vary in the way they conduct kōan practice, but in the Myōshin-ji–Daitoku-ji branch, when a monk has passed a kōan the Zen teacher will instruct him to bring a 'capping phrase' ... The monk selects a verse or phrase that expresses the insight he has had while meditating on the kōan. He searches for this capping phrase in one of the several Zen phrase books that have been especially compiled for this purpose. If the monk continues into advanced stages of the Rinzai Zen kōan curriculum, he will receive further literary assignments: the writing of explanations in Japanese, called kakiwake 書き分け, and the composition of Chinese-style poetry, called nenrō 拈弄 ... The research and writing required to complete kakiwake and nenrō writing assignments can consume considerable amounts of time during the later stages of a monk's stay in the monastery." (pp. 3–4.)

== Bibliography ==
- Victor Sōgen Hori (2003) Zen sand: the book of capping phrases for kōan practice. Honolulu: University of Hawai'i. ISBN 978-0-8248-2284-2 pdf of Introduction
- Sōiku Shigematsu (1981) A Zen Forest: Sayings of the Masters. Compiled and translated, with an introduction, by Sōiku Shigematsu. N. Y.; Tokyo, ISBN 978-0-8348-0159-2
