= Okitsu Station =

Railway station in Shizuoka, Japan

CA13 Okitsu Station 興津駅
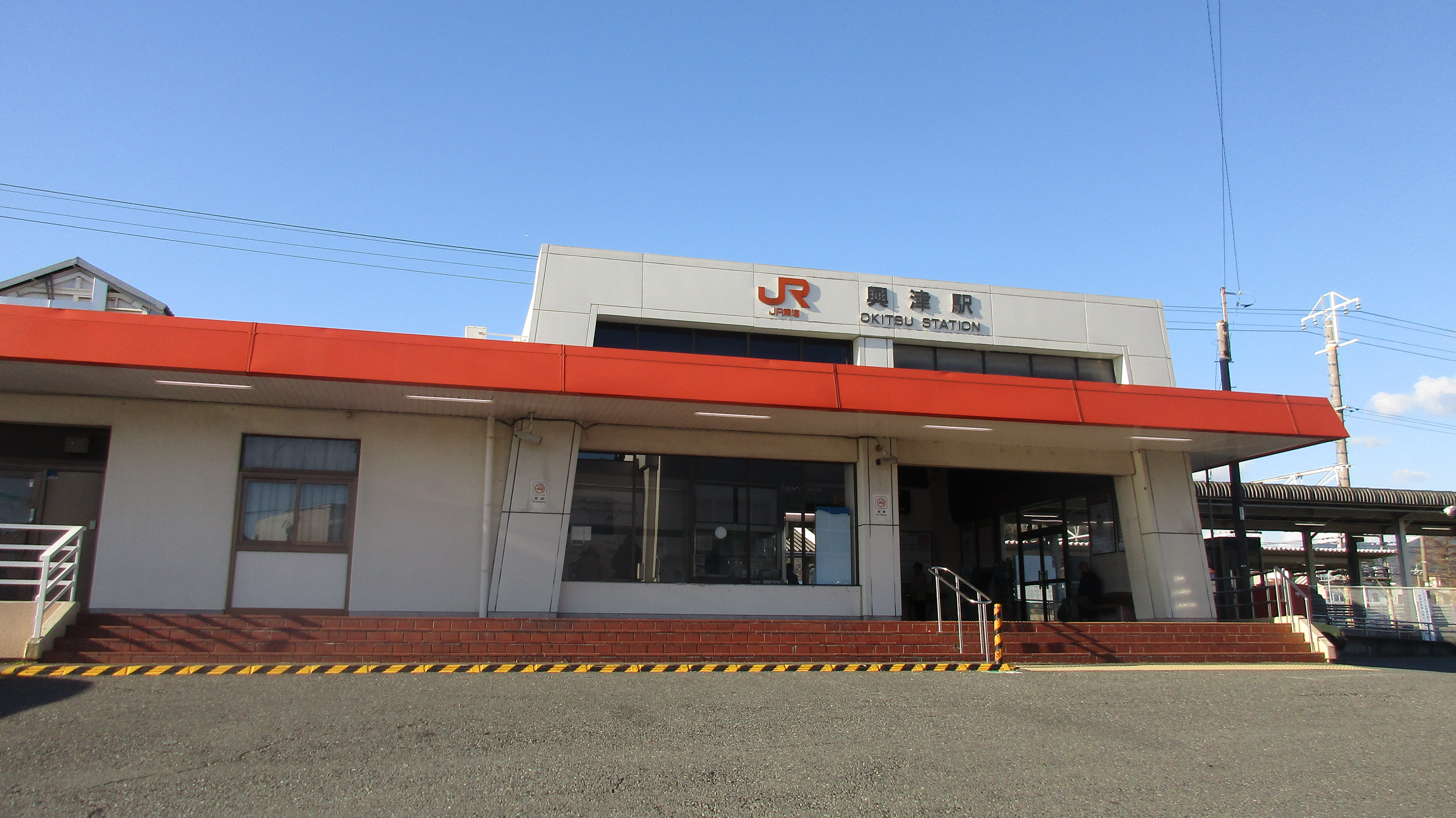
- Okitsu Station in December 2016

General information
- Location: Okitsu-Nakamachi, Shimizu-ku, Shizuoka-shi, Shizuoka-ken; Japan
- Coordinates: 35°3′9″N 138°31′19″E
- Operator: JR Central
- Line: Tokaido Main Line
- Distance: 164.3 kilometers from Tokyo
- Platforms: 1 island + 1 side platform

Construction
- Structure type: Ground level

Other information
- Status: Staffed
- Station code: CA13
- Website: Official website

History
- Opened: November 1, 1909

Passengers
- FY2017: 2,184 daily
Location
- Location within Shizuoka Prefecture Location within Japan

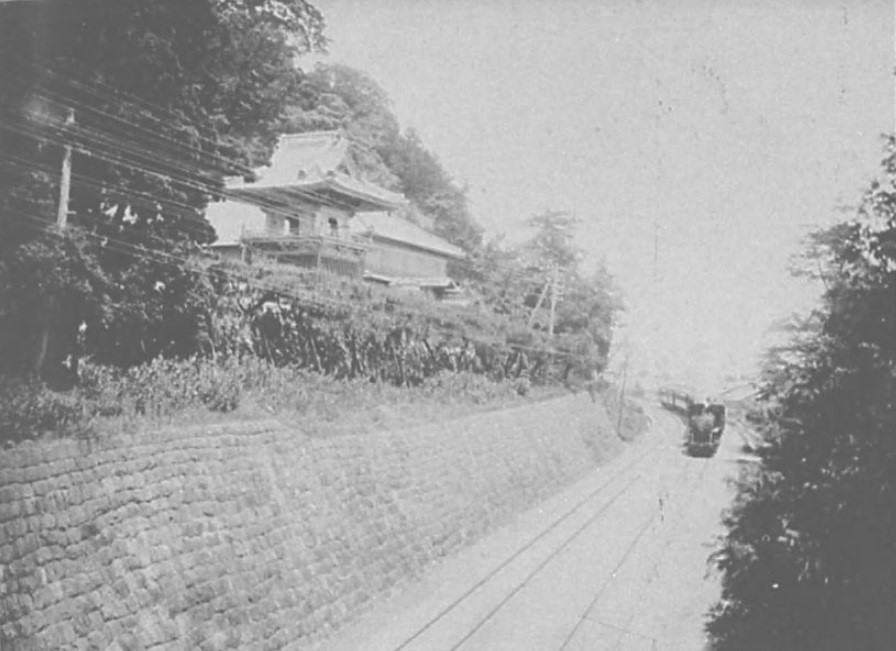
Okitsu Station in 1911

Okitsu Station (興津駅, Okitsu-eki) is a railway station in Shimizu-ku, Shizuoka City, Shizuoka Prefecture, Japan, operated by Central Japan Railway Company (JR Tōkai).

== Lines ==
Okitsu Station is served by the Tōkaidō Main Line, and is located 164.3 kilometers from the starting point of the line at Tokyo Station.

== Station layout ==
Okitsu Station has a single side platform serving Track 1 and an island platform serving Track 2 and Track 3, connected to the station building by a footbridge. Track 3 is used for terminating services arriving from east and west, and also for services departing in both directions. The station building has automated ticket machines, TOICA automated turnstiles and a staffed ticket office.

=== Platforms ===
1	■ Tōkaidō Main Line	For Shimizu・Shizuoka・Hamamatsu
2	■ Tōkaidō Main Line	For Fuji・Numazu・Mishima・Atami
3	■ Tōkaidō Main Line	For auxiliary service

== Adjacent stations ==
«	Service	»
Central Japan Railway Company
Tōkaidō Main Line
Rapid: Does not stop at this station
Commuter Rapid: Does not stop at this station
Limited Express Fujikawa: Does not stop at this station
Sleeper Limited Express Sunrise Izumo: Does not stop at this station
Sleeper Limited Express Sunrise Seto: Does not stop at this station
Yui	Local	Shimizu

== Station history ==
Okitsu Station was opened on 1 February 1889 when the section of the Tōkaidō Main Line connecting Shizuoka with Kōzu was completed. It is located near the site of Okitsu-juku on the old Tōkaidō. The area quickly developed into a summer seaside resort for the aristocracy, politicians and noted literary figures in the Meiji and Taishō periods. A noted resident of Okitsu was the genrō Saionji Kinmochi, whose practice was to order express trains to make a special unscheduled stop at Okitsu Station whenever he wanted to travel. The station building was rebuilt in 1930 and in 1981.

Between 1926 and 1964 there was a station called Sodeshi Station was situated 2.4 km (1.5 mi) towards Shimizu Station, operating in the summer months to cater for beachgoers. Sodeshi Station closed in 1971.

Station numbering was introduced to the section of the Tōkaidō Line operated JR Central in March 2018; Yui Station was assigned station number CA13.

== Passenger statistics ==
In fiscal 2017, the station was used by an average of 2,184 passengers daily (boarding passengers only).

== Surrounding area ==
- Seiken-ji
- Okitsu Elementary School
- Okitsu Junior High School

== See also ==
- List of railway stations in Japan
