= Shimizu Station (Shizuoka) =

Railway station in Shizuoka, Japan

CA14 Shimizu Station 清水駅
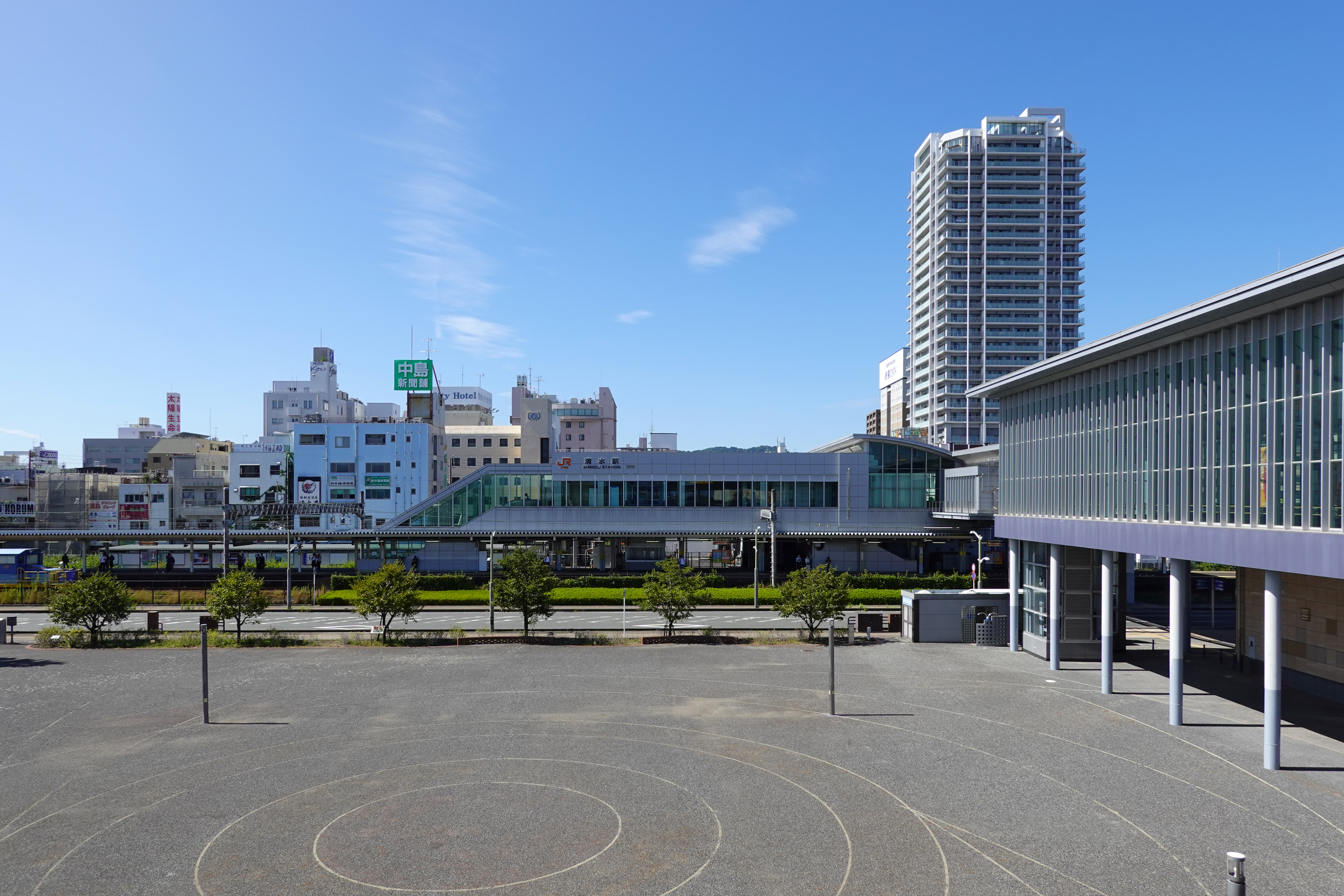
- JR Shimizu Station in 2023

General information
- Location: Manago-machi, Shimizu, Shizuoka, Shizuoka （静岡県静岡市清水区真砂町） Japan
- Coordinates: 35°1′24″N 138°29′20″E
- Operator: JR Central
- Line: Tokaido Main Line
- Distance: 169.0 kilometers from Tokyo
- Platforms: 1 island platform

Other information
- Status: Staffed
- Station code: CA14
- Website: Official website

History
- Opened: February 1, 1889
- Former names: Ejiri (until 1934)

Passengers
- 2017: 10,652 daily
Location
- Location within Shizuoka Prefecture Location within Japan

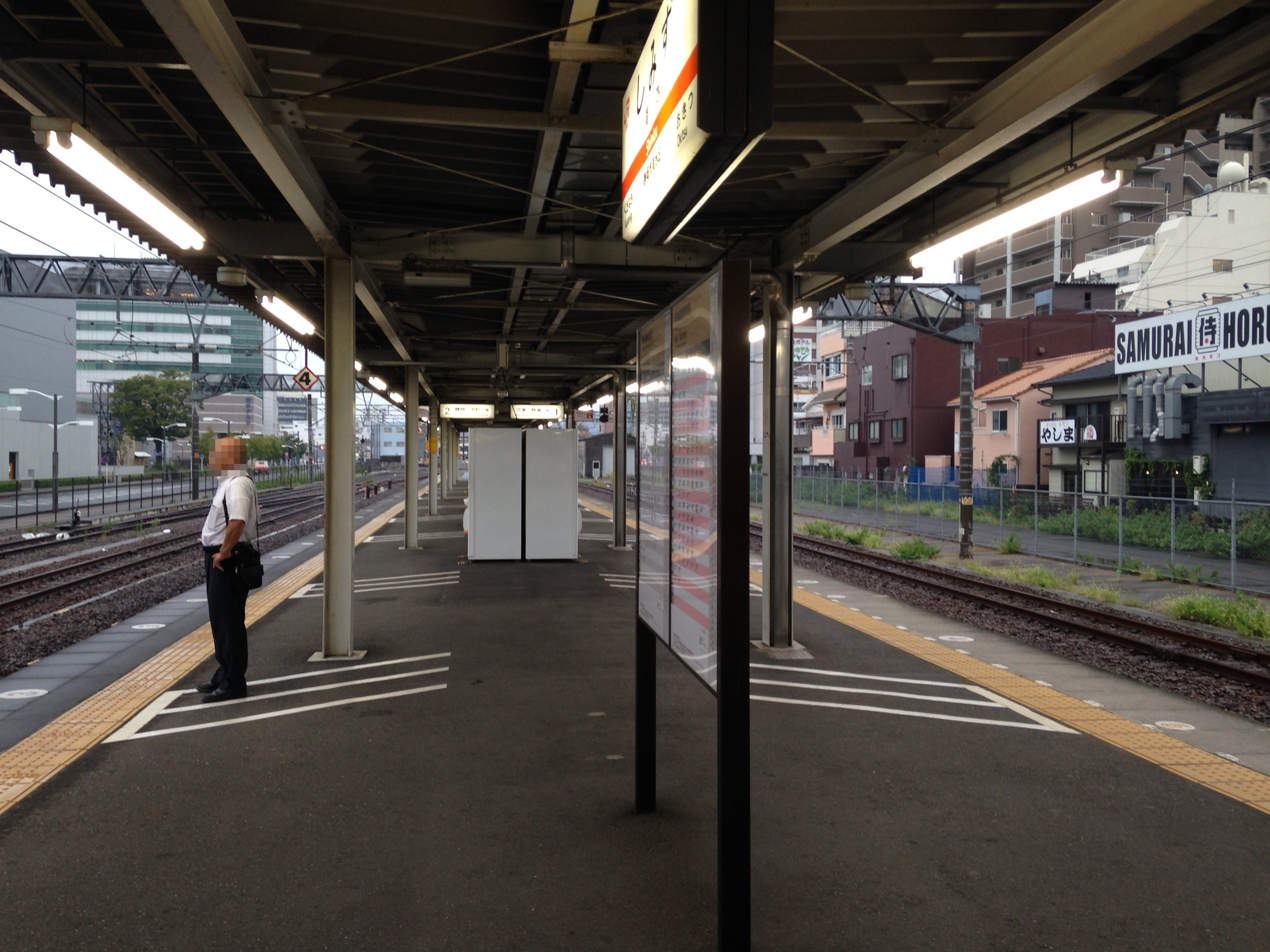
Platform

Shimizu Station (清水駅, Shimizu-eki) is a railway station in Shimizu-ku, Shizuoka City, Shizuoka Prefecture, Japan, operated by Central Japan Railway Company (JR Tōkai).

== Lines ==
Shimizu Station is served by the Tōkaidō Main Line, and is located 169.0 kilometers from the starting point of the line at Tokyo Station.

== Station layout ==
The station has a single island platform serving Track 1 and Track 2, connected to the station building by a footbridge. The station building has automated ticket machines, TOICA automated turnstiles and a staffed ticket office.

=== Platforms ===
1	■ Tōkaidō Main Line	For Fuji・Numazu・Mishima・Atami
2	■ Tōkaidō Main Line	For Shizuoka・Hamamatsu

== Adjacent stations ==
«	Service	»
Central Japan Railway Company
Tōkaidō Main Line
Sleeper Limited Express Sunrise Izumo/Seto: Does not stop at this station
Fuji	Limited Express Fujikawa	Shizuoka
Fuji	Home Liner	Shizuoka
Okitsu	Local	Kusanagi

== Station history ==
Shimizu Station first opened as Ejiri Station (江尻駅, Ejiri-eki) on February 1, 1889, when the section of the Tōkaidō Main Line connecting Shizuoka with Kōzu was completed. It was named after Ejiri-juku, the 18th station of the historical Tōkaidō. In 1934 it was renamed Shimizu Station.

From 1916 the Shimizukō Line ran as a branch line from Shimizu Station through the industrial port area of the town before terminating in Miho. In 1984 this line was replaced by a bus service. Regularly scheduled freight services were discontinued in 1984, and all freight services by 2001. Transfer to the Shizuoka-Shimizu Railway is available via Shin-Shimizu Station, a ten-minute walk from the east exit. The current station building was completed in June 2003.

Station numbering was introduced to the section of the Tōkaidō Line operated JR Central in March 2018; Shimizu Station was assigned station number CA14.

== Passenger statistics ==
In fiscal 2017, the station was used by an average of 10,652 passengers daily (boarding passengers only).

== Surrounding area ==
- Shimizu Fishing Port
- Former City Hall of Shimizu

== See also ==
- List of railway stations in Japan
