= 2015 Nagoya Grampus season =

Nagoya Grampus
2015 season
- Chairman: Toyo Kato
- Manager: Akira Nishino
- J.League: 9th
- Emperor's Cup: Second Round vs Machida Zelvia
- J.League Cup: Quarter-final vs Gamba Osaka
- Top goalscorer: League: Kensuke Nagai (10 goals); All: Kengo Kawamata (11 goals)
Home colours	Away colours

The 2015 Nagoya Grampus season was Nagoya Grampus' 23rd season in the J.League Division 1 and 33rd overall in the Japanese top flight. It was Akira Nishino's second season as manager.

== Squad ==
As of 18 February 2015

Note: Flags indicate national team as defined under FIFA eligibility rules; some limited exceptions apply. Players may hold more than one non-FIFA nationality.

No.	Pos.	Nation	Player
1	GK	JPN	Seigo Narazaki
2	DF	JPN	Akira Takeuchi
3	DF	JPN	Yusuke Muta
4	DF	JPN	Tulio (Captain)
5	DF	JPN	Shun Obu
6	DF	JPN	Yuki Honda
7	MF	JPN	Taishi Taguchi
8	MF	COL	Danilson Córdoba
9	FW	JPN	Ryunosuke Noda
10	MF	JPN	Yoshizumi Ogawa
11	FW	JPN	Kensuke Nagai
13	MF	JPN	Ryota Isomura
14	MF	JPN	Ryota Tanabe
18	FW	SLO	Milivoje Novaković
19	FW	JPN	Kisho Yano

No.	Pos.	Nation	Player
20	MF	JPN	Asahi Yada
21	GK	JPN	Koji Nishimura
22	FW	JPN	Tomoya Koyamatsu
23	MF	JPN	Ryota Aoki
24	DF	JPN	Nikki Havenaar
25	MF	JPN	Reo Mochizuki
26	MF	JPN	Yuto Mori
27	FW	JPN	Koki Sugimori
29	DF	JPN	Kazuki Sato
30	GK	JPN	Masataka Nomura
32	FW	JPN	Kengo Kawamata
33	MF	BRA	Leandro Domingues
34	FW	BRA	Gustavo
35	MF	JPN	Teruki Tanaka
50	GK	JPN	Yoshinari Takagi

=== Out on loan ===
Note: Flags indicate national team as defined under FIFA eligibility rules; some limited exceptions apply. Players may hold more than one non-FIFA nationality.

No. / Pos. / Nation / Player; 17 / FW / JPN / Riki Matsuda (at JEF United)	No. / Pos. / Nation / Player; — / DF / JPN / Ryosuke Tone (at V-Varen Nagasaki)

== Transfers ==
=== Winter ===
In: Note: Flags indicate national team as defined under FIFA eligibility rules; some limited exceptions apply. Players may hold more than one non-FIFA nationality.

No.	Pos.	Nation	Player
2	DF	JPN	Akira Takeuchi (from (Japan) JEF United)
5	DF	JPN	Shun Obu (from Fukuoka University)
11	FW	JPN	Kensuke Nagai (from (Belgium) Standard Liège, previously on loan)
18	FW	SLO	Milivoje Novaković (from (Japan) Shimizu S-Pulse)
35	MF	JPN	Teruki Tanaka (loan return from (Japan) Oita Trinita)

Out: Note: Flags indicate national team as defined under FIFA eligibility rules; some limited exceptions apply. Players may hold more than one non-FIFA nationality.

No.	Pos.	Nation	Player
5	MF	BRA	Régis (loan return to (Brazil) Atlético Goianiense)
6	DF	JPN	Ryosuke Tone (loan to (Japan) V-Varen Nagasaki)
7	MF	JPN	Naoshi Nakamura (Retired)
11	FW	JPN	Keiji Tamada (to (Japan) Cerezo Osaka)
16	FW	AUS	Joshua Kennedy (to (Australia) Melbourne City)
38	MF	JPN	Takuma Edamura (loan return to (Japan) Shimizu S-Pulse)
—	MF	JPN	Makito Yoshida (to (Japan) Matsumoto Yamaga, previously on loan)
—	MF	JPN	Taisuke Mizuno (to (Japan) Gifu, previously on loan)
—	FW	BRA	Tiago

=== Summer ===
In: Note: Flags indicate national team as defined under FIFA eligibility rules; some limited exceptions apply. Players may hold more than one non-FIFA nationality.

No.	Pos.	Nation	Player

Out: Note: Flags indicate national team as defined under FIFA eligibility rules; some limited exceptions apply. Players may hold more than one non-FIFA nationality.

No.	Pos.	Nation	Player
17	FW	JPN	Riki Matsuda (loan to (Japan) JEF United)

== Competitions ==
=== J.League ===
==== First stage ====
===== Results summary =====
Overall								Home						Away					
Pld	W	D	L	GF	GA	GD	Pts	W	D	L	GF	GA	GD	W	D	L	GF	GA	GD
17	6	4	7	18	18	0	22	4	3	2	13	7	+6	2	1	5	5	11	−6

Last updated: 29 June 2015.
Source: see below

===== Results by round =====
Round	1	2	3	4	5	6	7	8	9	10	11	12	13	14	15	16	17
Ground	H	A	H	A	H	H	A	A	H	A	H	H	A	H	A	H	A
Result	D	L	D	L	W	W	L	W	W	L	L	L	W	D	D	W	L
Position	9	12	16	18	12	9	11	9	7	7	8	11	9	10	8	8	9

Updated to match(es) played on 29 June 2015. Source: See below
A = Away; H = Home; W = Win; D = Draw; L = Loss

===== Results =====
7 March 2015 1	Nagoya Grampus	3 – 3	Matsumoto Yamaga	Toyota
14:00 JST (UTC+9)	Koyamatsu 34'; Novaković (yellow card) 77' (goal) 80'; Tulio 78'	Report	Obina 32'; Ikemoto 63'; Kiyama 76'; Goto (yellow card) 89'	Stadium: Toyota Stadium; Attendance: 33,558; Referee: Hiroyuki Kimura

14 March 2015 2	Ventforet Kofu	1 – 0	Nagoya Grampus	Kōfu
14:00 JST (UTC+9)	Matsuhashi (yellow card) 18'; Abe 80'	Report		Stadium: Yamanashi Chuo Bank Stadium; Attendance: 11,851; Referee: Kazuyoshi Enomoto

22 March 2015 3	Nagoya Grampus	1 – 1	Kashima Antlers	Nagoya
17:00 JST (UTC+9)	Muta (yellow card) 57'; Yano 69'	Report	Kanazaki 32'; Umebachi (yellow card) 52'; Hwang (yellow card) 75'; Doi (yellow card) 78'; Caio (yellow card) 90+3'	Stadium: Mizuho Athletic Stadium; Attendance: 16,053; Referee: Hajime Matsuo

3 April 2015 4	Gamba Osaka	3 – 1	Nagoya Grampus	Suita
19:00 JST (UTC+9)	Endō (yellow card) 35'; Usami 45+1', 49'; Konno 80'	[ Report]	Nagai 63'; Danilson (yellow card) 90+2'	Stadium: Osaka Expo '70 Stadium; Attendance: 10,702; Referee: Toshimitsu Yoshida

12 April 2015 5	Nagoya Grampus	2 – 0	Sanfrecce Hiroshima	Toyota
15:00 JST (UTC+9)	Danilson (yellow card) 19'; Kawamata 45+2'; Tulio (yellow card) 60'; Kisho Yano 85'	Report		Stadium: Toyota Stadium; Attendance: 15,080; Referee: Ryuji Sato

18 April 2015 6	Nagoya Grampus	3 – 1	Shimizu S-Pulse	Nagoya
19:00 JST (UTC+9)	Matsuda 6'; Nagai 19'; Kawamata 48'	Report	Murata 89'; Hiraoka (yellow card) 90+2'	Stadium: Mizuho Athletic Stadium; Attendance: 9,986; Referee: Jumpei Iida

25 April 2015 7	Urawa Red Diamonds	2 – 1	Nagoya Grampus	Midori-ku
17:00 JST (UTC+9)	Ugajin (yellow card) 37'; Sekine 39'; Muto 52'	Report	Nagai (yellow card) 90'; Tanaka 90+3'	Stadium: Saitama Stadium 2002; Attendance: 29,803; Referee: Kenji Ogiya

29 April 2015 8	Vissel Kobe	0 – 1	Nagoya Grampus	Kobe
17:00 JST (UTC+9)	H.Tanaka (yellow card) 90+1'	Report	Nagai 55'; Matsuda (yellow card) 58'	Stadium: Noevir Stadium Kobe; Attendance: 17,052; Referee: Nobutsugu Murakami

2 May 2015 9	Nagoya Grampus	3 – 0	Shonan Bellmare	Nagoya
13:00 JST (UTC+9)	Nagai 35'; Kawamata 42'; Tulio 82'	Report	Tsuboi (yellow card) 36'; Kim (yellow card) 62'	Stadium: Mizuho Athletic Stadium; Attendance: 11,375; Referee: Yuichi Nishimura

6 May 2015 10	Yokohama F. Marinos	2 – 0	Nagoya Grampus	Yokohama
15:00 JST (UTC+9)	Ademilson 11'; Nakamachi 51' (yellow card) 83'; Kida (yellow card) 69'	Report	Tanaka (yellow card) 26' (yellow-red card) 45+1'	Stadium: Nissan Stadium; Attendance: 22,514; Referee: Hiroyoshi Takayama

10 May 2015 11	Nagoya Grampus	0 – 1	Kawasaki Frontale	Toyota
13:00 JST (UTC+9)	Muta (yellow card) 60'; Yano (yellow card) 72'	Report	Igawa (yellow card) 32'; Ōkubo 45+1'; Kakuda (yellow card) 59'	Stadium: Toyota Stadium; Attendance: 16,952; Referee: Itaru Hirose

16 May 2015 12	Nagoya Grampus	0 – 1	Sagan Tosu	Toyota
19:00 JST (UTC+9)	Kawamata (yellow card) 74'; Tulio (yellow card) 89'	Report	Toyoda 90+4'	Stadium: Toyota Stadium; Attendance: 14,825; Referee: Koichiro Fukushima

23 May 2015 13	Tokyo	0 – 1	Nagoya Grampus	Tokyo
19:00 JST (UTC+9)	Tokunaga (yellow card) 39'	Report	Morishige 73' (o.g.); Isomura (yellow card) 79' (yellow-red card) 84'	Stadium: Ajinomoto Stadium; Attendance: 23,460; Referee: Futoshi Nakamura

30 May 2015 14	Nagoya Grampus	0 – 0	Montedio Yamagata	Toyota
14:00 JST (UTC+9)	Gustavo (yellow card) 75'; Nagai (yellow card) 90+2'	Report	Kim (yellow card) 37'; Toma (yellow card) 55'	Stadium: Toyota Stadium; Attendance: 13,662; Referee: Takuto Okabe

7 June 2015 15	Albirex Niigata	1 – 1	Nagoya Grampus	Niigata
16:00 JST (UTC+9)	Rafael Silva (yellow card) 27'; Yamazaki 42' (yellow card) 78'; Fitzgerald (yellow card) 49'; Koizumi (yellow card) 64'	Report	Nagai 33'; Yano (yellow card) 86'	Stadium: Denka Big Swan Stadium; Attendance: 19,030; Referee: Minoru Tojo

20 June 2015 16	Nagoya Grampus	1 – 0	Kashiwa Reysol	Toyota
16:00 JST (UTC+9)	Ogawa (yellow card) 54'; Novaković 75' (yellow card) 90'	Report	Wako (yellow card) 21'; Taketomi (red card) 90+3'	Stadium: Toyota Stadium; Attendance: 15,848; Referee: Masuya Ueda

27 June 2015 17	Vegalta Sendai	2 – 0	Nagoya Grampus	Sendai
19:00 JST (UTC+9)	Kim (yellow card) 7'; Nozawa 38'; Okuno 69'	Report		Stadium: Yurtec Stadium Sendai; Attendance: 12,644; Referee: Toshimitsu Yoshida

===== League table =====
Pos	Team	Pld	W	D	L	GF	GA	GD	Pts
8	Kashima Antlers	17	6	4	7	27	25	+2	22
9	Nagoya Grampus	17	6	4	7	18	18	0	22
10	Shonan Bellmare	17	6	4	7	20	24	−4	22

Updated to match(es) played on 27 June 2015. Source: Meiji Yasuda J1 League Standings
Rules for classification: 1) Points; 2) Goal difference; 3) Goals scored

==== Second stage ====
===== Results summary =====
Overall								Home						Away					
Pld	W	D	L	GF	GA	GD	Pts	W	D	L	GF	GA	GD	W	D	L	GF	GA	GD
17	7	3	7	24	30	−6	24	5	1	2	13	11	+2	2	2	5	11	19	−8

Last updated: 23 November 2015.
Source: see below

===== Results by round =====
Round	1	2	3	4	5	6	7	8	9	10	11	12	13	14	15	16	17
Ground	A	H	A	H	A	H	A	H	A	H	A	H	A	A	H	H	A
Result	L	W	D	W	W	L	W	D	L	L	L	W	L	D	W	W	L
Position	15	9	7	6	3	7	5	7	8	10	11	10	10	11	10	10	10

Updated to match(es) played on 23 November 2015. Source: See below
A = Away; H = Home; W = Win; D = Draw; L = Loss

===== Results =====
11 July 2015 1	Shonan Bellmare	2 – 1	Nagoya Grampus	Hiratsuka
18:00 JST (UTC+9)	Otsuki 32'; Takayama 64'	Report	Kawamata 76'; Yano (yellow card) 79'	Stadium: Shonan BMW Stadium Hiratsuka; Attendance: 10,752

15 July 2015 2	Nagoya Grampus	3 – 2	Gamba Osaka	Nagoya
19:00 JST (UTC+9)	Nagai 49' (yellow card) 56'; Tulio 73' (pen.); Kawamata 81'	Report	Omori 8'; Patric 30'; Iwashita (yellow card) 73'	Stadium: Mizuho Athletic Stadium; Attendance: 13,422; Referee: Nobutsugu Murakami

19 July 2015 3	Shimizu S-Pulse	1 – 1	Nagoya Grampus	Shizuoka
18:30 JST (UTC+9)	Inukai (yellow card) 7'; Utaka 47', 70' (yellow card) 64'; Honda (yellow card) 64'; Duke (yellow card) 66'	Report	Yano (yellow card) 49'; Tulio (red card) 53'; Kawamata 65' (pen.); Novaković 80'	Stadium: IAI Stadium Nihondaira; Attendance: 14,497; Referee: Futoshi Nakamura

25 July 2015 4	Nagoya Grampus	2 – 1	Urawa Red Diamonds	Nagoya
19:00 JST (UTC+9)	Kawamata 20'; Yano 63'; Narazaki (yellow card) 90+5'	Report	Muta 20' (o.g.); Moriwaki (red card) 22'	Stadium: Mizuho Athletic Stadium; Attendance: 17,624; Referee: Itaru Hirose

29 July 2015 5	Montedio Yamagata	0 – 3	Nagoya Grampus	Tendō
19:00 JST (UTC+9)		Report	Ogawa (yellow card) 5'; Takeuchi (yellow card) 31'; Isomura 45+1', 82'; Kawamata 69'	Stadium: ND Soft Stadium Yamagata; Attendance: 6,100; Referee: Hiroyoshi Takayama

12 August 2015 6	Nagoya Grampus	0 – 3	Yokohama F. Marinos	Nagoya
19:00 JST (UTC+9)		Report	Rafinha (yellow card) 20'; Saito 30'; Ademilson 45'; Ito 89'	Stadium: Mizuho Athletic Stadium; Attendance: 17,093; Referee: Yuichi Nishimura

16 August 2015 7	Matsumoto Yamaga	0 – 1	Nagoya Grampus	Nagoya
18:00 JST (UTC+9)		Report	Yada 38'	Stadium: Mizuho Athletic Stadium; Attendance: 17,442; Referee: Minoru Tojo

22 August 2015 8	Nagoya Grampus	0 – 0	Tokyo	Nagoya
19:00 JST (UTC+9)	Isomura (yellow card) 82'	Report	Takahashi (yellow card) 57'; Sandaza (yellow card) 75'	Stadium: Mizuho Athletic Stadium; Attendance: 19,011; Referee: Yoshiro Imamura

29 August 2015 9	Sanfrecce Hiroshima	5 – 2	Nagoya Grampus	Hiroshima
19:00 JST (UTC+9)	Douglas 6', 52', 85'; Satō 9'; Asano 71'	Report	Isomura (yellow card) 42'; Yano (yellow card) 71'; Muta 77'; Nagai 79' (yellow card) 81'	Stadium: Hiroshima Big Arch; Attendance: 13,916; Referee: Kazuyoshi Enomoto

12 September 2015 10	Nagoya Grampus	0 – 1	Vegalta Sendai	Toyota
18:30 JST (UTC+9)		Report	Ishikawa (yellow card) 18'; Kamata (yellow card) 61'; Tomita (yellow card) 63'; Okuno 79' (yellow card) 88'	Stadium: Toyota Stadium; Attendance: 21,008; Referee: Futoshi Nakamura

19 September 2015 11	Kawasaki Frontale	6 – 1	Nagoya Grampus	Kawasaki
19:00 JST (UTC+9)	Kobayashi 35'; Tasaka 43'; Ōkubo 45', 67', 90+3'; Elsinho 57'; Nakano (yellow card) 74'	Report	Yada (yellow card) 45'; Tulio 75'	Stadium: Todoroki Athletics Stadium; Attendance: 20,238; Referee: Toshimitsu Yoshida

26 September 2015 12	Nagoya Grampus	2 – 0	Vissel Kobe	Nagoya
19:30 JST (UTC+9)	Tulio 35' (yellow card) 75'; Ogawa 53'; Honda (yellow card) 69'; Yada (yellow card) 77'; Isomura (yellow card) 80'	Report	Okui (yellow card) 30'; Takahashi (yellow card) 75'	Stadium: Mizuho Athletic Stadium; Attendance: 11,570; Referee: Shoichiro Mikami

3 October 2015 13	Kashiwa Reysol	3 – 1	Nagoya Grampus	Kashiwa
19:00 JST (UTC+9)	Kudo 12', 41'; Ōtsu (yellow card) 86'; Otani (yellow card) 88'; Nakagawa 89'	Report	Noda 6'; Yano (yellow card) 82'	Stadium: Hitachi Kashiwa Soccer Stadium; Attendance: 10,103; Referee: Yuichi Nishimura

17 October 2015 14	Sagan Tosu	0 – 0	Nagoya Grampus	Tosu
18:30 JST (UTC+9)	Hayasaka (yellow card) 13'; Yoshida (yellow card) 33'	Report	Isomura (yellow card) 51'; Tanaka (yellow card) 88'	Stadium: Tosu Stadium; Attendance: 13,707; Referee: Minoru Dongcheng

24 October 2015 15	Nagoya Grampus	4 – 2	Albirex Niigata	Nagoya
14:00 JST (UTC+9)	Nagai 71' (pen.), 90+5'; Taguchi 74'; Kawamata 85'	Report	Fitzgerald (yellow card) 44'; Yamazaki 45'; Ibusuki 78'; Kobayashi (yellow card) 82'	Stadium: Mizuho Athletic Stadium; Attendance: 12,045; Referee: Yudai Yamamoto

7 November 2015 16	Nagoya Grampus	4 – 2	Ventforet Kofu	Toyota
14:00 JST (UTC+9)	Yano (yellow card) 24'; Novaković 31', 74'; Nagai 35'; Taguchi 56'	Report	Baré 12' (yellow card) 83'; Shimoda 90+1'	Stadium: Toyota Stadium; Attendance: 16,970; Referee: Hajime Matsuo

22 November 2015 17	Kashima Antlers	1 – 0	Nagoya Grampus	Kashima
13:30 JST (UTC+9)	Nakamura 55'; Ogasawara (yellow card) 80'; Toyokawa (yellow card) 80'; Nishi (yellow card) 84'	Report	Yano (yellow card) 90+3'	Stadium: Kashima Soccer Stadium; Attendance: 25,151; Referee: Kenji Ogiya

===== League table =====
Pos	Team	Pld	W	D	L	GF	GA	GD	Pts
9	Shonan Bellmare	17	7	5	5	20	20	0	26
10	Nagoya Grampus	17	7	3	7	26	30	−4	24
11	Albirex Niigata	17	5	5	7	21	25	−4	20

Updated to match(es) played on 22 November 2015. Source: Meiji Yasuda J1 League 2nd Stage Standings
Rules for classification: 1) Points; 2) Goal difference; 3) Goals scored

==== Overall ====
Round	1	2	3	4	5	6	7	8	9	10	11	12	13	14	15	16	17	18	19	20	21	22	23	24	25	26	27	28	29	30	31	32	33	34
Ground	H	A	H	A	H	H	A	A	H	A	H	H	A	H	A	H	A	A	H	A	H	A	H	A	H	A	H	A	H	A	A	H	H	
Result	D	L	D	L	W	W	L	W	W	L	L	L	W	D	D	W	L	L	W	D	W	W	L	W	D	L	L	L	W	L	D	W	W	L
Position	9	12	16	18	12	9	11	9	7	7	8	11	9	10	8	8	9	12	9	9	7	7	8	9	9	10	10	10	9	10	10	10	9	9

Updated to match(es) played on 23 November 2015. Source: See below
A = Away; H = Home; W = Win; D = Draw; L = Loss

Pos	Team	Pld	W	D	L	GF	GA	GD	Pts
7	Yokohama F. Marinos	34	15	10	9	45	32	+13	55
8	Shonan Bellmare	34	13	9	12	40	44	−4	48
9	Nagoya Grampus	34	13	7	14	44	48	−4	46
10	Kashiwa Reysol	34	12	9	13	46	43	+3	45
11	Sagan Tosu	34	9	13	12	37	54	−17	40

Updated to match(es) played on 28 November 2015. Source: Meiji Yasuda J1 League Standings
Rules for classification: 1) Points; 2) Goal difference; 3) Goals scored

=== J.League Cup ===
==== Group stage ====
18 March 2015 1	Kawasaki Frontale	1 – 3	Nagoya Grampus	Kawasaki
19:00 JST (UTC+9)	Ōkubo 12'; Renatinho (yellow card) 38'	Report	Tulio (yellow card) 24'; Nagai 42'; Kawamata 49', 88'	Stadium: Todoroki Athletics Stadium; Attendance: 12,253; Referee: Kenji Ogiya

28 March 2015 2	Nagoya Grampus	3 – 2	Vegalta Sendai	Nagoya
14:00 JST (UTC+9)	Matsuda 11'; Yada 13'; Ogawa 26'	Report	Wilson 49'; Kamata 55'; Watanabe (yellow card) 57'; Hachisuka (yellow card) 71'	Stadium: Mizuho Athletic Stadium; Attendance: 6,918; Referee: Masaaki Toma

8 April 2015 3	Montedio Yamagata	3 – 3	Nagoya Grampus	Tendō
18:00 JST (UTC+9)	Hidaka (yellow card) 33'; Toma 40', 56'; Bandai 90+2'	Report	Takeuchi 8'; Yada (yellow card) 45+1' (goal) 49'; Novaković 63'; Isomura (yellow card) 90+2'	Stadium: ND Soft Stadium Yamagata; Attendance: 3,588; Referee: Yudai Yamamoto

22 April 2015 4	Nagoya Grampus	1 – 0	Yokohama F. Marinos	Nagoya
18:00 JST (UTC+9)	Tulio 45+1' (pen.)	Report	Kobayashi (yellow card) 15'; Satō (yellow card) 82'	Stadium: Mizuho Athletic Stadium; Attendance: 5,696; Referee: Takuto Okabe

20 May 2015 5	Shimizu S-Pulse	1 – 2	Nagoya Grampus	Shizuoka
18:00 JST (UTC+9)	Kitagawa 20'; Takagi (yellow card) 57'	Report	Koyamatsu 66'; Novaković 86'	Stadium: IAI Stadium Nihondaira; Attendance: 6,315; Referee: Hiroyuki Kimura

3 June 2015 6	Nagoya Grampus	0 – 4	Vissel Kobe	Nagoya
19:00 JST (UTC+9)		Report	Yasuda (yellow card) 25'; Ogawa (yellow card) 36'; Jung 49'; Pedro Júnior 61', 74'; Watanabe 66'	Stadium: Mizuho Athletic Stadium; Attendance: 4,466; Referee: Hiromichi Oka

==== Knockout stage ====
2 September 2015 Quarter-final 1st leg	Gamba Osaka	1 – 1	Nagoya Grampus	Suita
19:00 JST (UTC+9)	Futagawa 6'	Report	Noda 76'	Stadium: Osaka Expo '70 Stadium; Attendance: 6,064

6 September 2015 Quarter-final 2nd leg	Nagoya Grampus	2 – 2 (a.e.t.) (3 – 3 agg.) (9 – 10 p)	Gamba Osaka	Nagoya
18:30 JST (UTC+9)	Noda 7'; Ogawa (yellow card) 31'; Isomura (yellow card) 77'; Tulio 105'	Summary; Report	Abe 41'; Kurata (yellow card) 44'; Iwashita 94'	Stadium: Mizuho Athletic Stadium; Attendance: 8,064; Referee: Jumpei Iida
	Penalties
	Tulio (penalty scored); Noda (penalty scored); Taguchi (penalty scored); Takeuchi (penalty scored); Ogawa (penalty scored); Yano (penalty missed); Mochizuki (penalty scored); Isomura (penalty scored); Muta (penalty scored); Honda (penalty scored); Takagi (penalty missed)		Endō (penalty scored); Kurata (penalty scored); Konno (penalty scored); Patric (penalty scored); Lins (penalty scored); Iwashita (penalty missed); Ideguchi (penalty scored); Kim (penalty scored); Oh (penalty scored); Fujiharu (penalty scored); Fujigaya (penalty scored)

=== Emperor's Cup ===
9 September 2015 Second Round	Nagoya Grampus	0 – 1	Machida Zelvia	Toyota
19:00 JST (UTC+9)	Taguchi (yellow card) 57'; Danilson (yellow card) 90+1'	Report	Shigematsu (yellow card) 79'; Masuda (yellow card) 81'; Suzuki 90+3'	Stadium: Toyota Stadium

== Squad statistics ==
As of match played 22 November 2015

=== Appearances and goals ===
No.	Pos	Nat	Player	Total		J-League		J-League Cup		Emperor's Cup	
No.	Pos	Nat	Player	Apps	Goals	Apps	Goals	Apps	Goals	Apps	Goals
1	GK	(Japan) JPN	Seigo Narazaki	40	0	34	0	6	0	0	0
2	DF	(Japan) JPN	Akira Takeuchi	41	1	33	0	7	1	1	0
3	DF	(Japan) JPN	Yusuke Muta	29	1	19+5	1	4	0	1	0
4	DF	(Japan) JPN	Tulio	37	7	31	5	6	2	0	0
5	DF	(Japan) JPN	Shun Obu	9	0	4+2	0	2	0	1	0
6	DF	(Japan) JPN	Yuki Honda	38	0	28+1	0	7+1	0	0+1	0
7	MF	(Japan) JPN	Taishi Taguchi	13	2	11	2	1+1	0	0	0
8	MF	(Colombia) COL	Danilson Córdoba	16	0	10+2	0	2+1	0	0+1	0
9	FW	(Japan) JPN	Ryunosuke Noda	6	3	3+1	1	1+1	2	0	0
10	MF	(Japan) JPN	Yoshizumi Ogawa	36	2	29+3	1	4	1	0	0
11	FW	(Japan) JPN	Kensuke Nagai	35	11	30+1	10	3+1	1	0	0
13	MF	(Japan) JPN	Ryota Isomura	31	2	16+8	2	7	0	0	0
14	MF	(Japan) JPN	Ryota Tanabe	9	0	2+3	0	2+1	0	1	0
18	FW	(Slovenia) SLO	Milivoje Novaković	30	7	14+12	5	2+2	2	0	0
19	FW	(Japan) JPN	Kisho Yano	36	3	27+1	3	6+1	0	0+1	0
20	MF	(Japan) JPN	Asahi Yada	42	3	33+1	1	7+1	2	0	0
22	FW	(Japan) JPN	Tomoya Koyamatsu	28	2	17+5	1	5	1	1	0
25	MF	(Japan) JPN	Reo Mochizuki	7	0	2+1	0	0+3	0	1	0
26	MF	(Japan) JPN	Yuto Mori	2	0	0	0	1	0	1	0
27	FW	(Japan) JPN	Koki Sugimori	7	0	0+4	0	2	0	1	0
29	DF	(Japan) JPN	Kazuki Sato	3	0	0+1	0	1+1	0	0	0
30	GK	(Japan) JPN	Masataka Nomura	1	0	0	0	0	0	1	0
32	FW	(Japan) JPN	Kengo Kawamata	40	11	22+11	9	5+1	2	1	0
33	MF	(Brazil) BRA	Leandro Domingues	3	0	0+3	0	0	0	0	0
34	FW	(Brazil) BRA	Gustavo	8	0	0+6	0	0+2	0	0	0
35	MF	(Japan) JPN	Teruki Tanaka	23	1	3+15	1	2+2	0	1	0
50	GK	(Japan) JPN	Yoshinari Takagi	3	0	0	0	2+1	0	0	0
Players who left Nagoya Grampus on loan during the season:
17	FW	(Japan) JPN	Riki Matsuda	15	2	6+5	1	3+1	1	0	0
Players who left Nagoya Grampus during the season:

=== Goal Scorers ===
Place	Position	Nation	Number	Name	J-League	J-League Cup	Emperor's Cup	Total
1	FW	(Japan)	32	Kengo Kawamata	9	2	0	11
2	FW	(Japan)	11	Kensuke Nagai	10	1	0	10
3	DF	(Japan)	4	Tulio	5	2	0	7
3	FW	(Slovenia)	18	Milivoje Novaković	5	2	0	7
5	FW	(Japan)	19	Kisho Yano	3	0	0	3
5	FW	(Japan)	9	Ryunosuke Noda	1	2	0	3
7	MF	(Japan)	13	Ryota Isomura	2	0	0	2
7	MF	(Japan)	7	Taishi Taguchi	2	0	0	2
7	FW	(Japan)	17	Riki Matsuda	1	1	0	2
7	FW	(Japan)	22	Tomoya Koyamatsu	1	1	0	2
7	MF	(Japan)	10	Yoshizumi Ogawa	1	1	0	2
7	MF	(Japan)	20	Asahi Yada	0	2	0	2
13	MF	(Japan)	35	Teruki Tanaka	1	0	0	1
13	MF	(Japan)	20	Asahi Yada	1	0	0	1
13	DF	(Japan)	3	Yusuke Muta	1	0	0	1
13				Own goal	1	0	0	1
13	DF	(Japan)	2	Akira Takeuchi	0	1	0	1
				TOTALS	44	15	0	59

=== Disciplinary record ===
Number	Nation	Position	Name	J-League		J.League Cup		Emperor's Cup		Total	
Number	Nation	Position	Name	Yellow card	Red card	Yellow card	Red card	Yellow card	Red card	Yellow card	Red card
1	(Japan)	GK	Seigo Narazaki	1	0	0	0	0	0	1	0
2	(Japan)	DF	Akira Takeuchi	1	0	0	0	0	0	1	0
3	(Japan)	DF	Yusuke Muta	2	0	0	0	0	0	2	0
4	(Japan)	DF	Tulio	3	1	1	0	0	0	4	1
6	(Japan)	DF	Yuki Honda	1	0	0	0	0	0	1	0
7	(Japan)	MF	Taishi Taguchi	0	0	0	0	1	0	1	0
8	(Colombia)	MF	Danilson Córdoba	2	0	0	0	1	0	3	0
10	(Japan)	MF	Yoshizumi Ogawa	2	0	1	0	0	0	3	0
11	(Japan)	FW	Kensuke Nagai	4	0	0	0	0	0	4	0
13	(Japan)	MF	Ryota Isomura	6	1	2	0	0	0	8	1
17	(Japan)	FW	Riki Matsuda	1	0	0	0	0	0	1	0
18	(Slovenia)	FW	Milivoje Novaković	2	0	0	0	0	0	2	0
19	(Japan)	FW	Kisho Yano	8	0	0	0	0	0	8	0
20	(Japan)	MF	Asahi Yada	2	0	1	0	0	0	3	0
32	(Japan)	FW	Kengo Kawamata	1	0	0	0	0	0	1	0
34	(Japan)	FW	Gustavo	1	0	0	0	0	0	1	0
35	(Japan)	MF	Teruki Tanaka	3	1	0	0	0	0	3	1
			TOTALS	39	3	5	0	2	0	46	3
