= 2014 Nagoya Grampus season =

Nagoya Grampus
2014 season
- Chairman: Toyo Kato
- Manager: Akira Nishino
- J.League: 10th
- Emperor's Cup: Quarter-finals vs Shimizu S-Pulse
- J.League Cup: Group Stage
- Top goalscorer: League: Kensuke Nagai (12 goals); All: Kensuke Nagai (19 goals)
| Home colours | Away colours |

The 2014 Nagoya Grampus season was Nagoya Grampus' 22nd season in the J.League Division 1 and 32nd overall in the Japanese top flight. It is Akira Nishino's first season as manager after replacing Dragan Stojković in the off-season. They finished the season in 10th place, reaching the Quarter Finals of the Emperor's Cup whilst failing to progress from the group stages of the J.League Cup.

== Squad ==
As of 6 February 2014 Note: Flags indicate national team as defined under FIFA eligibility rules; some limited exceptions apply. Players may hold more than one non-FIFA nationality.

| No. | Pos. | Nation | Player |
|---|---|---|---|
| 1 | GK | JPN | Seigo Narazaki (captain) |
| 3 | DF | JPN | Yusuke Muta |
| 4 | DF | JPN | Tulio Tanaka |
| 5 | MF | BRA | Régis (loan from Atlético Goianiense) |
| 6 | DF | JPN | Ryosuke Tone |
| 7 | MF | JPN | Naoshi Nakamura |
| 8 | MF | COL | Dánilson |
| 9 | FW | JPN | Ryunosuke Noda |
| 10 | MF | JPN | Yoshizumi Ogawa |
| 11 | FW | JPN | Keiji Tamada |
| 13 | MF | JPN | Ryota Isomura |
| 14 | MF | JPN | Ryota Tanabe |
| 15 | DF | JPN | Yuki Honda |
| 16 | FW | AUS | Joshua Kennedy |
| 17 | FW | JPN | Riki Matsuda |
| 18 | FW | JPN | Kensuke Nagai (loan from Standard Liège) |
| 19 | FW | JPN | Kisho Yano |

| No. | Pos. | Nation | Player |
|---|---|---|---|
| 20 | MF | JPN | Asahi Yada |
| 21 | GK | JPN | Koji Nishimura |
| 22 | FW | JPN | Tomoya Koyamatsu |
| 23 | MF | JPN | Ryota Aoki |
| 24 | DF | JPN | Nikki Havenaar |
| 25 | MF | JPN | Reo Mochizuki |
| 26 | MF | JPN | Yuto Mori |
| 27 | FW | JPN | Koki Sugimori |
| 28 | MF | JPN | Taishi Taguchi |
| 29 | DF | JPN | Kazuki Sato |
| 30 | GK | JPN | Masataka Nomura |
| 32 | FW | JPN | Kengo Kawamata |
| 33 | MF | BRA | Leandro Domingues |
| 34 | FW | BRA | Gustavo |
| 38 | MF | JPN | Takuma Edamura (loan from Shimizu S-Pulse) |
| 50 | GK | JPN | Yoshinari Takagi |

=== Out on loan ===
Note: Flags indicate national team as defined under FIFA eligibility rules; some limited exceptions apply. Players may hold more than one non-FIFA nationality.

| No. | Pos. | Nation | Player |
|---|---|---|---|
| — | MF | JPN | Taisuke Mizuno (at Gifu) |
| — | MF | JPN | Teruki Tanaka (at Oita Trinita) |

| No. | Pos. | Nation | Player |
|---|---|---|---|
| — | MF | JPN | Makito Yoshida (at Matsumoto Yamaga) |
| — | FW | BRA | Tiago (at Gifu) |

== Transfers ==
=== Winter ===
In: Note: Flags indicate national team as defined under FIFA eligibility rules; some limited exceptions apply. Players may hold more than one non-FIFA nationality.

| No. | Pos. | Nation | Player |
|---|---|---|---|
| 2 | DF | JPN | Shun Obu |
| 5 | MF | BRA | Régis (loan from (Brazil) Atlético Goianiense) |
| 6 | DF | JPN | Ryosuke Tone (from (Japan) Tokyo Verdy) |
| 9 | FW | JPN | Ryunosuke Noda (from (Japan) Sagan Tosu) |
| 17 | FW | JPN | Riki Matsuda (from (Japan) Oita Trinita) |
| 20 | MF | JPN | Asahi Yada |
| 22 | FW | JPN | Tomoya Koyamatsu |
| 23 | MF | JPN | Ryota Aoki (from (Japan) JEF Chiba) |
| 26 | MF | JPN | Yuto Mori |
| 27 | FW | JPN | Koki Sugimori |
| 30 | GK | JPN | Masataka Nomura |
| 38 | MF | JPN | Takuma Edamura (loan from (Japan) Shimizu S-Pulse) |

Out: Note: Flags indicate national team as defined under FIFA eligibility rules; some limited exceptions apply. Players may hold more than one non-FIFA nationality.

| No. | Pos. | Nation | Player |
|---|---|---|---|
| 5 | DF | JPN | Takahiro Masukawa (to (Japan) Vissel Kobe) |
| 6 | DF | JPN | Shohei Abe (to (Japan) Ventforet Kofu) |
| 8 | MF | JPN | Jungo Fujimoto (to (Japan) Yokohama F. Marinos) |
| 9 | MF | MKD | Nikola Jakimovski (to (North Macedonia) FK Jagodina) |
| 21 | GK | JPN | Koji Nishimura |
| 22 | DF | BRA | Daniel (to (Brazil) Cabofriense) |
| 23 | DF | JPN | Yōsuke Ishibitsu (to (Japan) Kyoto Sanga) |
| 26 | FW | BRA | Tiago (loan to (Japan) Gifu) |
| 31 | FW | JPN | Motoki Takahara |
| 32 | DF | JPN | Hayuma Tanaka (to (Japan) Matsumoto Yamaga) |
| 35 | MF | JPN | Teruki Tanaka (loan to (Japan) Oita Trinita) |
| — | MF | JPN | Taisuke Mizuno (loan to (Japan) Gifu, previously on loan) |

=== Summer ===
In: Note: Flags indicate national team as defined under FIFA eligibility rules; some limited exceptions apply. Players may hold more than one non-FIFA nationality.

| No. | Pos. | Nation | Player |
|---|---|---|---|
| 32 | FW | JPN | Kengo Kawamata (from (Japan) Albirex Niigata) |
| 33 | MF | BRA | Leandro Domingues (from (Japan) Kashiwa Reysol) |

Out: Note: Flags indicate national team as defined under FIFA eligibility rules; some limited exceptions apply. Players may hold more than one non-FIFA nationality.

| No. | Pos. | Nation | Player |

== Competitions ==
=== J.League ===
==== Results summary ====
| Overall | | | | | | | | Home | | | | | | Away | | | | | |
| Pld | W | D | L | GF | GA | GD | Pts | W | D | L | GF | GA | GD | W | D | L | GF | GA | GD |
|---|---|---|---|---|---|---|---|---|---|---|---|---|---|---|---|---|---|---|---|
| 34 | 13 | 9 | 12 | 47 | 48 | −1 | 48 | 3 | 6 | 8 | 23 | 29 | −6 | 10 | 3 | 4 | 24 | 19 | +5 |

Last updated: 6 December 2014.
Source: see below

==== Results by round ====
| Round | 1 | 2 | 3 | 4 | 5 | 6 | 7 | 8 | 9 | 10 | 11 | 12 | 13 | 14 | 15 | 16 | 17 | 18 | 19 | 20 | 21 | 22 | 23 | 24 | 25 | 26 | 27 | 28 | 29 | 30 | 31 | 32 | 33 | 34 |
|---|---|---|---|---|---|---|---|---|---|---|---|---|---|---|---|---|---|---|---|---|---|---|---|---|---|---|---|---|---|---|---|---|---|---|
| Ground | H | A | A | H | A | H | H | A | H | A | H | A | H | A | H | A | H | A | H | A | H | H | A | H | A | H | A | A | H | A | H | A | H | A |
| Result | L | W | W | W | L | L | L | L | L | W | L | W | L | D | D | D | D | L | L | W | D | D | W | W | W | L | W | L | D | W | D | D | W | W |
| Position | 16 | 7 | 6 | 4 | 6 | 11 | 12 | 15 | 15 | 13 | 14 | 11 | 13 | 15 | 15 | 14 | 14 | 15 | 15 | 14 | 14 | 14 | 12 | 12 | 11 | 12 | 12 | 12 | 12 | 12 | 11 | 12 | 11 | 10 |

Updated to match(es) played on 6 December 2014. Source: See below
A = Away; H = Home; W = Win; D = Draw; L = Loss

==== Results ====
| 1 March 2014 Round 1 | Nagoya Grampus | 2 – 3 | Shimizu S-Pulse | Toyota |
| 14:00 JST (UTC+9) | Kennedy 20'; Tulio 36' | Report | Takagi 5'; Hiraoka 73'; Novaković 80' | Stadium: Toyota Stadium; Attendance: 21,657; Referee: Itaru Hirose |

| 8 March 2014 Round 2 | Omiya Ardija | 1 – 2 | Nagoya Grampus | Ōmiya-ku |
| 15:00 JST (UTC+9) | Takahashi 70' | Report | Tamada 53'; Ogawa 66' | Stadium: NACK5 Stadium Omiya; Attendance: 9,980; Referee: Jumpei Iida |

| 15 March 2014 Round 3 | Kashiwa Reysol | 0 – 1 | Nagoya Grampus | Kashiwa |
| 15:00 JST (UTC+9) | | Report | Kennedy 66' | Stadium: Hitachi Kashiwa Soccer Stadium; Attendance: 9,265; Referee: Yoshiro Imamura |

| 23 March 2014 Round 4 | Nagoya Grampus | 2 – 1 | Vissel Kobe | Nagoya |
| 15:00 JST (UTC+9) | Isomura 16'; Matsuda 87' | Report | Pedro Júnior 8' | Stadium: Mizuho Athletic Stadium; Attendance: 10,737; Referee: Hiroyoshi Takayama |

| 28 March 2014 Round 5 | Kawasaki Frontale | 1 – 0 | Nagoya Grampus | Kawasaki |
| 19:00 JST (UTC+9) | Ōkubo 68' | Report | | Stadium: Todoroki Athletics Stadium; Attendance: 12,431; Referee: Ryuji Sato |

| 6 April 2014 Round 6 | Nagoya Grampus | 2 – 5 | Sanfrecce Hiroshima | Toyota |
| 13:00 JST (UTC+9) | Kennedy 7', 86' | Report | Satō 20', 63' (pen.); Shiotani 57'; Ishihara 66'; Notsuda 88' | Stadium: Toyota Stadium; Attendance: 15,214; Referee: Minoru Tojo |

| 12 April 2014 Round 7 | Nagoya Grampus | 1 – 2 | Urawa Red Diamonds | Toyota |
| 15:00 JST (UTC+9) | Nagai 10'; Nagai (yellow card) 45+2' (yellow-red card) 81' | Report | Haraguchi 65'; Koroki 90+5' | Stadium: Toyota Stadium; Attendance: 19,505; Referee: Yoshiro Imamura |

| 19 April 2014 Round 8 | Ventforet Kofu | 2 – 0 | Nagoya Grampus | Kōfu |
| 19:00 JST (UTC+9) | Sasaki 27'; Ishihara 77' | Report | | Stadium: Yamanashi Chuo Bank Stadium; Attendance: 8,197; Referee: Hiroyuki Kimura |

| 26 April 2014 Round 9 | Nagoya Grampus | 2 – 3 | Sagan Tosu | Nagoya |
| 15:00 JST (UTC+9) | Tulio 40' (pen.); Nagai 84' | Report | Toyoda 28'; Kim 56' (pen.); Taniguchi 90+3' | Stadium: Mizuho Athletic Stadium; Attendance: 9,065; Referee: Jumpei Iida |

| 29 April 2014 Round 10 | FC Tokyo | 0 – 1 | Nagoya Grampus | Tokyo |
| 13:00 JST (UTC+9) | | Report | Yano 48' | Stadium: Ajinomoto Stadium; Attendance: 25,851; Referee: Nobutsugu Murakami |

| 3 May 2014 Round 11 | Nagoya Grampus | 1 – 2 | Cerezo Osaka | Toyota |
| 19:00 JST (UTC+9) | Tulio 58' (pen.) | Report | Kakitani 5'; Yamashita (yellow card) 42' (yellow-red card) 57'; Forlán 78' | Stadium: Toyota Stadium; Attendance: 38,966; Referee: Yuadi Yamamoto |

| 6 May 2014 Round 12 | Kashima Antlers | 1 – 2 | Nagoya Grampus | Kashima |
| 15:00 JST (UTC+9) | Davi 43' (pen.) | Report | Ogawa 35'; Tamada 54' | Stadium: Kashima Soccer Stadium; Attendance: 15,122; Referee: Toshimitsu Yoshida |

| 11 May 2014 Round 13 | Nagoya Grampus | 1 – 2 | Gamba Osaka | Toyota |
| 13:00 JST (UTC+9) | Tulio 88' | Report | Abe 66'; Omori 85' | Stadium: Toyota Stadium; Attendance: 20,781; Referee: Masaaki Iemoto Toma |

| 17 May 2014 Round 14 | Albirex Niigata | 1 – 1 | Nagoya Grampus | Niigata |
| 15:00 JST (UTC+9) | T.Tanaka 11' | Report | Nagai 5' | Stadium: Denka Big Swan Stadium; Attendance: 24,176; Referee: Takuto Okabe |

| 19 July 2014 Round 15 | Nagoya Grampus | 1 – 1 | Tokushima Vortis | Toyota, Aichi |
| 19:00 JST (UTC+9) | Tulio 27' | Summary | Takasaki 37' | Stadium: Toyota Stadium; Attendance: 22,635; Referee: Nobutsugu Murakami |

| 23 July 2014 Round 16 | Vegalta Sendai | 3 – 3 | Nagoya Grampus | Kobe |
| 20:00 JST (UTC+9) | Akamine 19'; Sugai 66'; Futami 82' | Report | Taguchi 58'; Yano 71'; Domingues 90+2' | Stadium: Kobe City Misaki Park Stadium; Attendance: 13,302; Referee: Toshimitsu Yoshida |

| 27 July 2014 Round 17 | Nagoya Grampus | 1 – 1 | Yokohama F. Marinos | Nagoya |
| 19:00 JST (UTC+9) | Nagai 82' | Report | Nakamura 24' | Stadium: Mizuho Athletic Stadium; Attendance: 16,261; Referee: Takuto Okabe |

| 2 August 2014 Round 18 | Sagan Tosu | 1 – 0 | Nagoya Grampus | Tosu |
| 19:00 JST (UTC+9) | Ikeda 83' | Summary | | Stadium: Tosu Stadium; Attendance: 10,415; Referee: Maasaki Iemoto |

| 9 August 2014 Round 19 | Nagoya Grampus | 2 – 3 | Kashima Antlers | Toyota, Aichi |
| 19:00 JST (UTC+9) | Nagai 25'; Kennedy 47' (pen.) | Summary | Yamamoto 41'; Davi 82'; Endo 90' | Stadium: Toyota Stadium; Attendance: 16,369; Referee: Koichiro Fukushima |

| 16 August 2014 Round 20 | Gamba Osaka | 0 – 1 | Nagoya Grampus | Suita |
| 18:00 JST (UTC+9) | | Report | Domingues 78' | Stadium: Osaka Expo '70 Stadium; Attendance: 15,383; Referee: Tomoya Maeda |

| 23 August 2014 Round 21 | Nagoya Grampus | 1 – 1 | Kashiwa Reysol | Toyota, Aichi |
| 19:00 JST (UTC+9) | Tulio 25' | Report | Ota 84' | Stadium: Toyota Stadium; Attendance: 15,124; Referee: Hajime Matsuo |

| 30 August 2014 Round 22 | Nagoya Grampus | 1 – 1 | Kawasaki Frontale | Nagoya |
| 18:00 JST (UTC+9) | Kawamata 30' | Report | Taniguchi 1' | Stadium: Mizuho Athletic Stadium; Attendance: 15,312; Referee: Takuto Okabe |

| 13 September 2014 Round 23 | Yokohama F. Marinos | 0 – 2 | Nagoya Grampus | Yokohama |
| 19:00 JST (UTC+9) | | Report | Kawamata 35'; Nagai 48' | Stadium: International Stadium Yokohama; Attendance: 25,045; Referee: Yudai Yamamoto |

| 20 September 2014 Round 24 | Nagoya Grampus | 2 – 0 | Ventforet Kofu | Nagoya |
| 15:00 JST (UTC+9) | Yada 29'; Nagai 71' | Report | | Stadium: Mizuho Athletic Stadium; Attendance: 9,919; Referee: Futoshi Nakamura |

| 23 September 2014 Round 25 | Cerezo Osaka | 1 – 2 | Nagoya Grampus | Osaka |
| 19:00 JST (UTC+9) | Cacau 67' | Report | Kawamata 19'; Sakemoto 45' (o.g.) | Stadium: Nagai Stadium; Attendance: 17,807; Referee: Yoshiro Imamura |

| 27 September 2014 Round 26 | Nagoya Grampus | 0 – 1 | Albirex Niigata | Nagoya |
| 18:30 JST (UTC+9) | Domingues (yellow card) 80' (yellow-red card) 82' | Report | Ibusuki 59' | Stadium: Mizuho Athletic Stadium; Attendance: 11,652; Referee: Toshimitsu Yoshida |

| 5 October 2014 Round 27 | Vissel Kobe | 1 – 3 | Nagoya Grampus | Kobe |
| 15:00 JST (UTC+9) | Marquinhos 11' | Report | Kawamata 22'; Nagai 45+1', 58' | Stadium: Noevir Stadium Kobe; Attendance: 17,516; Referee: Toma Maasaki Iemoto |

| 18 October 2014 Round 28 | Sanfrecce Hiroshima | 4 – 0 | Nagoya Grampus | Hiroshima |
| 17:00 JST (UTC+9) | Ishihara 57', 82' (pen.); Satō 60'; Mizumoto 69' (pen.) | Report | Danilson (yellow card) 54' (yellow-red card) 67' | Stadium: Hiroshima Big Arch; Attendance: 16,304; Referee: Yosuke Kubota |

| 22 October 2014 Round 29 | Nagoya Grampus | 0 – 0 | Vegalta Sendai | Nagoya |
| 19:00 JST (UTC+9) | | Report | | Stadium: Mizuho Athletic Stadium; Attendance: 5,599; Referee: Minuro Tojo |

| 26 October 2014 Round 30 | Tokushima Vortis | 0 – 2 | Nagoya Grampus | Naruto |
| 19:00 JST (UTC+9) | | Report | Tanabe 78'; Danilson 82' | Stadium: Pocarisweat Stadium; Attendance: 8,094; Referee: Kenji Ogiya |

| 2 November 2014 Round 31 | Nagoya Grampus | 2 – 2 | FC Tokyo | Nagoya |
| 13:00 JST (UTC+9) | Morishige 19'; Tulio 29' | Report | Edu 21'; Muto 76' | Stadium: Mizuho Athletic Stadium; Attendance: 13,983; Referee: Yoshiro Imamura |

| 22 November 2014 Round 32 | Shimizu S-Pulse | 2 – 2 | Nagoya Grampus | Shizuoka |
| 17:00 JST (UTC+9) | Novaković 30'; Tulio 60' (o.g.); Jakovic (yellow card) 42' (yellow-red card) 90' | Report | Tanabe 21'; Nagai 51'; Honda (yellow card) 19' (yellow-red card) 57' | Stadium: IAI Stadium Nihondaira; Attendance: 17,352; Referee: Futoshi Nakamura |

| 29 November 2014 Round 33 | Nagoya Grampus | 2 – 1 | Omiya Ardija | Toyota |
| 17:00 JST (UTC+9) | Nagai 6'; Ogawa 90+2' | Report | Hashimoto 51' | Stadium: Toyota Stadium; Attendance: 21,695; Referee: Takuto Okabe |

| 6 December 2014 Round 34 | Urawa Red Diamonds | 1 – 2 | Nagoya Grampus | Midori-ku |
| 15:30 JST (UTC+9) | Makino 2' | Report | Muta 72'; Nagai 89' | Stadium: Saitama Stadium 2002; Attendance: 53,091; Referee: Yuichi Nishimura |

==== League table ====
| Pos | Team | Pld | W | D | L | GF | GA | GD | Pts |
|---|---|---|---|---|---|---|---|---|---|
| 8 | Sanfrecce Hiroshima | 34 | 13 | 11 | 10 | 44 | 37 | +7 | 50 |
| 9 | FC Tokyo | 34 | 12 | 12 | 10 | 47 | 33 | +14 | 48 |
| 10 | Nagoya Grampus | 34 | 13 | 9 | 12 | 47 | 48 | −1 | 48 |
| 11 | Vissel Kobe | 34 | 11 | 12 | 11 | 49 | 50 | −1 | 45 |
| 12 | Albirex Niigata | 34 | 12 | 8 | 14 | 30 | 36 | −6 | 44 |

Updated to match(es) played on 8 December 2014. Source: J.League Data
Rules for classification: 1) points; 2) goal difference; 3) number of goals scored.

=== J.League Cup ===
| 19 March 2014 Group Stage | Nagoya Grampus | 0 – 1 | Ventforet Kofu | Nagoya |
| 19:00 JST (UTC+9) | | Report | Cristiano 30' | Stadium: Mizuho Athletic Stadium; Attendance: 4,772; Referee: Koichiro Fukushima |

| 2 April 2014 Group Stage | Albirex Niigata | 3 – 3 | Nagoya Grampus | Niigata |
| 19:00 JST (UTC+9) | Jin-Su 17'; Tanaka 29'; Koizumi 89' | Report | Tulio 49'; Yada 51'; Ogawa 60'; Ogawa (yellow card) 72' (yellow-red card) 78' | Stadium: Denka Big Swan Stadium; Attendance: 8,505; Referee: Kazuyoshi Enomoto |

| 21 May 2014 Group Stage | Omiya Ardija | 0 – 2 | Nagoya Grampus | Ōmiya-ku |
| 19:00 JST (UTC+9) | | Report | Tulio 61'; Yano 83' | Stadium: NACK5 Stadium Omiya; Attendance: 4,681; Referee: Hiroyoshi Takayama |

| 24 May 2014 Group Stage | Nagoya Grampus | 2 – 1 | Tokushima Vortis | Toyota |
| 15:00 JST (UTC+9) | Tamada 28'; Ogawa 46' | Report | Kim 27' | Stadium: Toyota Stadium; Attendance: 11,579; Referee: Akihiko Ikeuchi |

| 28 May 2014 Group Stage | Nagoya Grampus | 1 – 0 | Kashiwa Reysol | Nagoya |
| 19:00 JST (UTC+9) | Tulio 85' | Report | | Stadium: Mizuho Athletic Stadium; Attendance: 5,941; Referee: Kenji Ogiya |

| 1 June 2014 Group Stage | Urawa Red Diamonds | 5 – 2 | Nagoya Grampus | Midori-ku |
| 15:00 JST (UTC+9) | Kashiwagi 18'; Lee 40', 76'; Makino 60'; Sekiguchi 88' | Report | Nagai 23'; Matsuda 72' | Stadium: Saitama Stadium 2002; Attendance: 33,837; Referee: Jumpei Iida |

=== Emperor's Cup ===
| 12 July 2014 Second round | Nagoya Grampus | 12 – 0 | Toyota Shukyudan | Nagoya |
| 15:00 JST (UTC+9) | Nagai 17', 21', 22', 41', 67'; Tulio 31'; Sato 45', 77'; Matsuda 68', 90+1'; Yada 71'; Tanabe 90+4' | Report | | Stadium: Mizuho Athletic Stadium; Attendance: 2,911 |

| 20 August 2014 Third round | Nagoya Grampus | 4 – 0 | Kyoto Sanga | Nagoya |
| 19:00 JST (UTC+9) | Matsuda 8'; Tulio 43'; Tamada 53', 67' | Report | | Stadium: Mizuho Athletic Stadium; Attendance: 2,892 |

| 10 September 2014 Round of 16 | Thespakusatsu Gunma | 0 – 1 | Nagoya Grampus | Nagoya |
| 19:04 JST (UTC+9) | | Report | Leandro Domingues 75' | Stadium: Mizuho Athletic Stadium; Attendance: 2,810 |

| 11 October 2014 Quarter-finals | Nagoya Grampus | 2 – 2 (3 – 5 p) | Shimizu S-Pulse | Nagoya |
| 19:00 JST (UTC+9) | Ogawa 72'; Nagai 82' | Report | Takagi 66', 67' | Stadium: Mizuho Athletic Stadium; Attendance: 6,113; Referee: Hiroyuki Kimura |
| | Penalties |
| | Tulio (penalty scored); Isomura (penalty scored); Nakamura (penalty scored); Yada (penalty missed) | | Omae (penalty scored); Takagi (penalty scored); Honda (penalty scored); Musaka (penalty scored); Hiraoka (penalty scored) |

== Squad statistics ==
As of match played 6 December 2014

=== Appearances and goals ===
| No. | Pos | Nat | Player | Total | | J-League | | J-League Cup | | Emperor's Cup | |
| No. | Pos | Nat | Player | Apps | Goals | Apps | Goals | Apps | Goals | Apps | Goals |
|---|---|---|---|---|---|---|---|---|---|---|---|
| 1 | GK | (Japan) JPN | Seigo Narazaki | 42 | 0 | 34 | 0 | 6 | 0 | 2 | 0 |
| 2 | DF | (Japan) JPN | Shun Obu | 14 | 0 | 12+1 | 0 | 1 | 0 | 0 | 0 |
| 3 | DF | (Japan) JPN | Yusuke Muta | 33 | 1 | 24 | 1 | 5 | 0 | 4 | 0 |
| 4 | DF | (Japan) JPN | Tulio | 38 | 12 | 30 | 7 | 4 | 3 | 4 | 2 |
| 5 | MF | (Brazil) BRA | Régis | 8 | 0 | 0+6 | 0 | 0+1 | 0 | 0+1 | 0 |
| 6 | DF | (Japan) JPN | Ryosuke Tone | 4 | 0 | 3 | 0 | 1 | 0 | 0 | 0 |
| 7 | MF | (Japan) JPN | Naoshi Nakamura | 22 | 0 | 7+11 | 0 | 1+1 | 0 | 2 | 0 |
| 8 | MF | (Colombia) COL | Danilson | 34 | 1 | 23+4 | 1 | 3+1 | 0 | 3 | 0 |
| 10 | MF | (Japan) JPN | Yoshizumi Ogawa | 33 | 6 | 19+6 | 3 | 4 | 2 | 2+2 | 1 |
| 11 | MF | (Japan) JPN | Keiji Tamada | 23 | 5 | 15+2 | 2 | 4 | 1 | 2 | 2 |
| 13 | MF | (Japan) JPN | Ryota Isomura | 20 | 1 | 12+5 | 1 | 0 | 0 | 1+2 | 0 |
| 14 | MF | (Japan) JPN | Ryota Tanabe | 18 | 3 | 8+5 | 2 | 0+4 | 0 | 0+1 | 1 |
| 15 | DF | (Japan) JPN | Yuki Honda | 41 | 0 | 33 | 0 | 5 | 0 | 3 | 0 |
| 16 | FW | (Australia) AUS | Joshua Kennedy | 11 | 5 | 11 | 5 | 0 | 0 | 0 | 0 |
| 17 | MF | (Japan) JPN | Riki Matsuda | 41 | 5 | 11+20 | 1 | 2+4 | 1 | 2+2 | 3 |
| 18 | FW | (Japan) JPN | Kensuke Nagai | 38 | 19 | 23+5 | 12 | 6 | 1 | 3+1 | 6 |
| 19 | FW | (Japan) JPN | Kisho Yano | 36 | 3 | 25+1 | 2 | 5+1 | 1 | 4 | 0 |
| 20 | MF | (Japan) JPN | Asahi Yada | 31 | 3 | 17+5 | 1 | 5 | 1 | 4 | 1 |
| 22 | FW | (Japan) JPN | Tomoya Koyamatsu | 4 | 0 | 0+1 | 0 | 1+2 | 0 | 0 | 0 |
| 23 | MF | (Japan) JPN | Ryota Aoki | 5 | 0 | 0+4 | 0 | 0+1 | 0 | 0 | 0 |
| 24 | DF | (Japan) JPN | Nikki Havenaar | 3 | 0 | 2 | 0 | 1 | 0 | 0 | 0 |
| 25 | MF | (Japan) JPN | Reo Mochizuki | 5 | 0 | 0+3 | 0 | 2 | 0 | 0 | 0 |
| 26 | MF | (Japan) JPN | Yuto Mori | 1 | 0 | 0 | 0 | 1 | 0 | 0 | 0 |
| 27 | FW | (Japan) JPN | Koki Sugimori | 2 | 0 | 0 | 0 | 0+1 | 0 | 0+1 | 0 |
| 28 | MF | (Japan) JPN | Taishi Taguchi | 38 | 1 | 26+3 | 1 | 6 | 0 | 2+1 | 0 |
| 29 | DF | (Japan) JPN | Kazuki Sato | 8 | 2 | 2+1 | 0 | 2 | 0 | 2+1 | 2 |
| 32 | FW | (Japan) JPN | Kengo Kawamata | 15 | 4 | 14+1 | 4 | 0 | 0 | 0 | 0 |
| 33 | MF | (Brazil) BRA | Leandro Domingues | 13 | 3 | 11 | 2 | 0 | 0 | 2 | 1 |
| 34 | FW | (Brazil) BRA | Gustavo | 3 | 0 | 0+3 | 0 | 0 | 0 | 0 | 0 |
| 38 | MF | (Japan) JPN | Takuma Edamura | 17 | 0 | 12+2 | 0 | 1+2 | 0 | 0 | 0 |
| 50 | GK | (Japan) JPN | Yoshinari Takagi | 2 | 0 | 0 | 0 | 0 | 0 | 2 | 0 |
Players who left Nagoya Grampus during the season:

=== Goal Scorers ===
| Place | Position | Nation | Number | Name | J-League | J-League Cup | Emperor's Cup | Total |
|---|---|---|---|---|---|---|---|---|
| 1 | FW | (Japan) | 18 | Kensuke Nagai | 12 | 1 | 6 | 19 |
| 2 | DF | (Japan) | 4 | Tulio | 7 | 3 | 2 | 12 |
| 3 | MF | (Japan) | 10 | Yoshizumi Ogawa | 3 | 2 | 1 | 6 |
| 4 | FW | (Australia) | 16 | Joshua Kennedy | 5 | 0 | 0 | 5 |
| 4 | FW | (Japan) | 11 | Keiji Tamada | 2 | 1 | 2 | 5 |
| 4 | MF | (Japan) | 17 | Riki Matsuda | 1 | 1 | 3 | 5 |
| 7 | MF | (Japan) | 32 | Kengo Kawamata | 4 | 0 | 0 | 4 |
| 8 | FW | (Japan) | 19 | Kisho Yano | 2 | 1 | 0 | 3 |
| 8 | MF | (Brazil) | 33 | Leandro Domingues | 2 | 0 | 1 | 3 |
| 8 | MF | (Japan) | 14 | Ryota Tanabe | 2 | 0 | 1 | 3 |
| 8 | MF | (Japan) | 20 | Asahi Yada | 1 | 1 | 1 | 3 |
| 12 | DF | (Japan) | 29 | Kazuki Sato | 0 | 0 | 2 | 2 |
| 12 | | | | Own goal | 2 | 0 | 0 | 2 |
| 13 | MF | (Japan) | 13 | Ryota Isomura | 1 | 0 | 0 | 1 |
| 13 | MF | (Japan) | 28 | Taishi Taguchi | 1 | 0 | 0 | 1 |
| 13 | MF | (Colombia) | 8 | Danilson | 1 | 0 | 0 | 1 |
| 13 | DF | (Japan) | 3 | Yusuke Muta | 1 | 0 | 0 | 1 |
| | | | | TOTALS | 46 | 10 | 19 | 75 |

=== Disciplinary record ===
| Number | Nation | Position | Name | J-League | | J.League Cup | | Emperor's Cup | | Total | |
| Number | Nation | Position | Name | Yellow card | Red card | Yellow card | Red card | Yellow card | Red card | Yellow card | Red card |
| 1 | (Japan) | GK | Seigo Narazaki | 1 | 0 | 0 | 0 | 0 | 0 | 1 | 0 |
| 2 | (Japan) | DF | Shun Obu | 2 | 0 | 0 | 0 | 0 | 0 | 2 | 0 |
| 4 | (Japan) | DF | Tulio | 2 | 0 | 2 | 0 | 0 | 0 | 4 | 0 |
| 7 | (Japan) | MF | Naoshi Nakamura | 1 | 0 | 0 | 0 | 1 | 0 | 2 | 0 |
| 8 | (Colombia) | MF | Danilson | 7 | 1 | 0 | 0 | 0 | 0 | 7 | 1 |
| 10 | (Japan) | MF | Yoshizumi Ogawa | 1 | 0 | 2 | 1 | 1 | 0 | 4 | 1 |
| 11 | (Japan) | FW | Keiji Tamada | 2 | 0 | 0 | 0 | 0 | 0 | 2 | 0 |
| 13 | (Japan) | MF | Ryota Isomura | 2 | 0 | 0 | 0 | 0 | 0 | 2 | 0 |
| 15 | (Japan) | DF | Yuki Honda | 5 | 1 | 0 | 0 | 1 | 0 | 6 | 1 |
| 16 | (Australia) | FW | Joshua Kennedy | 2 | 0 | 0 | 0 | 0 | 0 | 2 | 0 |
| 17 | (Japan) | MF | Riki Matsuda | 2 | 0 | 0 | 0 | 0 | 0 | 2 | 0 |
| 18 | (Japan) | FW | Kensuke Nagai | 7 | 1 | 0 | 0 | 1 | 0 | 8 | 1 |
| 19 | (Japan) | FW | Kisho Yano | 4 | 0 | 0 | 0 | 0 | 0 | 4 | 0 |
| 20 | (Japan) | MF | Asahi Yada | 1 | 0 | 0 | 0 | 0 | 0 | 1 | 0 |
| 28 | (Japan) | MF | Taishi Taguchi | 4 | 0 | 0 | 0 | 0 | 0 | 4 | 0 |
| 29 | (Japan) | DF | Kazuki Sato | 1 | 0 | 1 | 0 | 1 | 0 | 3 | 0 |
| 33 | (Brazil) | MF | Leandro Domingues | 4 | 1 | 0 | 0 | 0 | 0 | 4 | 1 |
| 34 | (Brazil) | FW | Gustavo | 1 | 0 | 0 | 0 | 0 | 0 | 1 | 0 |
| 38 | (Japan) | MF | Takuma Edamura | 1 | 0 | 1 | 0 | 0 | 0 | 2 | 0 |
| | | | TOTALS | 49 | 4 | 6 | 1 | 5 | 0 | 60 | 5 |
