= 2013 Nagoya Grampus season =

Nagoya Grampus
2013 season
- Chairman: Toyo Kato
- Manager: Dragan Stojković
- J. League: 11th
- Emperor's Cup: Second Round vs Nagano Parceiro
- J. League Cup: Group Stage
- Top goalscorer: League: Joshua Kennedy (12); All: Joshua Kennedy (12)
- Highest home attendance: 21,748 vs Júbilo Iwata; 2 March 2013
- Lowest home attendance: 4,106 vs Albirex Niigata; 22 May 2013
- Average home league attendance: 12,103; 16 July 2013
Home colours	Away colours

The 2013 Nagoya Grampus season was Nagoya Grampus' 21st season in the J. League Division 1 and 31st overall in the Japanese top flight. It was Dragan Stojković last season as manager, as he left at the end of the season, and they finished 11th in the J League, reached the group stage of the J. League Cup and were knocked out of the Emperor's Cup at the second round stage by Nagano Parceiro.

== Squad ==
As of January 26, 2013 Note: Flags indicate national team as defined under FIFA eligibility rules; some limited exceptions apply. Players may hold more than one non-FIFA nationality.

No.	Pos.	Nation	Player
1	GK	JPN	Seigo Narazaki
3	DF	JPN	Yusuke Muta
4	DF	JPN	Tulio
5	DF	JPN	Takahiro Masukawa
6	DF	JPN	Shohei Abe
7	MF	JPN	Naoshi Nakamura
8	MF	JPN	Jungo Fujimoto
9	MF	MKD	Nikola Jakimovski
10	MF	JPN	Yoshizumi Ogawa
11	FW	JPN	Keiji Tamada
13	MF	JPN	Ryota Isomura
15	DF	JPN	Yuki Honda
16	FW	AUS	Joshua Kennedy
18	FW	JPN	Kensuke Nagai (loan from Standard Liège)
19	FW	JPN	Kisho Yano

No.	Pos.	Nation	Player
20	MF	COL	Danilson Córdoba
21	GK	JPN	Koji Nishimura
22	DF	BRA	Daniel
23	DF	JPN	Yōsuke Ishibitsu
24	DF	JPN	Nikki Havenaar
25	MF	JPN	Reo Mochizuki
26	FW	BRA	Tiago
27	MF	JPN	Ryota Tanabe
28	MF	JPN	Taishi Taguchi
29	DF	JPN	Kazuki Sato
31	FW	JPN	Motoki Takahara
32	DF	JPN	Hayuma Tanaka
35	MF	JPN	Teruki Tanaka
50	GK	JPN	Yoshinari Takagi

=== Out on loan ===
Note: Flags indicate national team as defined under FIFA eligibility rules; some limited exceptions apply. Players may hold more than one non-FIFA nationality.

No. / Pos. / Nation / Player; 30 / MF / JPN / Taisuke Mizuno (at Gifu)	No. / Pos. / Nation / Player; — / MF / JPN / Makito Yoshida (at Matsumoto Yamaga)

== Transfers ==
=== Winter ===
In: Note: Flags indicate national team as defined under FIFA eligibility rules; some limited exceptions apply. Players may hold more than one non-FIFA nationality.

No.	Pos.	Nation	Player
3	DF	JPN	Yusuke Muta (Drafted from Fukuoka University)
9	FW	MKD	Nikola Jakimovski (from (Serbia) Javor Ivanjica)
15	DF	JPN	Yuki Honda (Drafted from Hannan University)
19	FW	JPN	Kisho Yano (from (Japan) Albirex Niigata)
24	DF	JPN	Nikki Havenaar (Promoted from youth team)
25	MF	JPN	Reo Mochizuki (Drafted from Yasu High School)
26	FW	BRA	Tiago (Drafted from Shibuya Makuhari High School)

Out: Note: Flags indicate national team as defined under FIFA eligibility rules; some limited exceptions apply. Players may hold more than one non-FIFA nationality.

No.	Pos.	Nation	Player
14	MF	JPN	Keiji Yoshimura (Released)
18	FW	JPN	Kensuke Nagai (to (Belgium) Standard Liège)
25	MF	JPN	Mu Kanazaki (to (Germany) Nürnberg)
26	DF	JPN	Tatsuya Arai (to (Japan) Gifu)
38	MF	JPN	Alessandro Santos (to (Japan) Tochigi)

=== Summer ===
In: Note: Flags indicate national team as defined under FIFA eligibility rules; some limited exceptions apply. Players may hold more than one non-FIFA nationality.

No.	Pos.	Nation	Player
18	FW	JPN	Kensuke Nagai (loan from (Belgium) Standard Liège)

Out: Note: Flags indicate national team as defined under FIFA eligibility rules; some limited exceptions apply. Players may hold more than one non-FIFA nationality.

No.	Pos.	Nation	Player
30	MF	JPN	Taisuke Mizuno (loan to (Japan) Gifu)

== Competitions ==
=== Friendlies ===
22 July 2013	Nagoya Grampus (Japan)	1–3	(England) Arsenal	Toyota
19:30 JST (UTC+9)	Yano 71'	[ Report]	Giroud 3'; Miyaichi 26' (pen.); Walcott 55'	Stadium: Toyota Stadium

=== J.League ===
==== Results summary ====
Overall								Home						Away					
Pld	W	D	L	GF	GA	GD	Pts	W	D	L	GF	GA	GD	W	D	L	GF	GA	GD
34	13	8	13	44	46	−2	47	9	5	3	24	17	+7	4	3	10	20	29	−9

Last updated: 9 December 2013.
Source: see below

==== Results by round ====
Round	1	2	3	4	5	6	7	8	9	10	11	12	13	14	15	16	17	18	19	20	21	22	23	24	25	26	27	28	29	30	31	32	33	34
Ground	H	A	A	H	A	H	A	H	A	H	H	A	A	H	A	H	A	H	A	H	A	H	H	A	A	A	H	H	A	H	A	H	H	A
Result	D	L	W	W	D	W	L	D	L	L	L	L	L	W	L	W	W	W	W	W	D	D	W	D	L	L	L	D	L	W	W	W	D	L
Position	10	14	10	6	5	4	6	7	9	11	14	14	14	13	14	12	12	11	11	9	10	10	9	8	9	11	13	13	13	12	11	10	10	11

Updated to match(es) played on 9 December 2013. Source: See below
A = Away; H = Home; W = Win; D = Draw; L = Loss

==== Results ====
2 March 2013 Round 1	Nagoya Grampus	1–1	Júbilo Iwata	Toyota
14:00 JST (UTC+9)	Tulio 35'	Report	Yamada 71'	Stadium: Toyota Stadium; Attendance: 21,748; Referee: Hajime Matsuo

9 March 2013 Round 2	Urawa Red Diamonds	1–0	Nagoya Grampus	Midori-ku
16:00 JST (UTC+9)	Ugajin 54'	Report		Stadium: Saitama Stadium 2002; Attendance: 52,293; Referee: Ryuji Sato

16 March 2013 Round 3	Ventforet Kofu	0–1	Nagoya Grampus	Kōfu
19:00 JST (UTC+9)	Matsuhashi (yellow card) 26' (yellow-red card) 56'	Report	Honda 90+4'	Stadium: Yamanashi Chuo Bank Stadium; Attendance: 11,230; Referee: Takuya Maeda

30 March 2013 Round 4	Nagoya Grampus	2–0	Shonan Bellmare	Nagoya
15:00 JST (UTC+9)	Tamada 45'; Ogawa 86'	Report		Stadium: Mizuho Athletic Stadium; Attendance: 10,706; Referee: Hiroyoshi Takayama

6 April 2013 Round 5	Kashiwa Reysol	3–3	Nagoya Grampus	Kashiwa
17:00 JST (UTC+9)	Kudo 4', 63'; Domingues 14'; Kurisawa (yellow card) 6' (yellow-red card) 45+1'	Report	T.Tanaka 3'; Masukawa 49'; Tamada 71'	Stadium: Hitachi Kashiwa Soccer Stadium; Attendance: 8,180; Referee: Takuto Okabe

13 April 2013 Round 6	Nagoya Grampus	2–0	Albirex Niigata	Toyota
15:00 JST (UTC+9)	Tamada 13' (pen.); T.Tanaka 32'	Report		Stadium: Toyota Stadium; Attendance: 13,159; Referee: Hiroyuki Kimura

20 April 2013 Round 7	F.C. Tokyo	3–1	Nagoya Grampus	Chōfu
15:00 JST (UTC+9)	Lucas 45+4' (pen.), 51' (pen.); Watanabe 59'	Report	Kennedy 30'; Taguchi (yellow card) 72' (yellow-red card) 85'	Stadium: Ajinomoto Stadium; Attendance: 16,804; Referee: Tomohiro Inoue

27 April 2013 Round 8	Nagoya Grampus	1–1	Sanfrecce Hiroshima	Nagoya
15:00 JST (UTC+9)	Ogawa 48'	Report	Aoyama 67'	Stadium: Mizuho Athletic Stadium; Attendance: 13,004; Referee: Yoshiro Imamura

3 May 2013 Round 9	Kawasaki Frontale	2–1	Nagoya Grampus	Nakahara-ku
19:00 JST (UTC+9)	Kobayashi 45+2'; Yamamoto 87'	Report	Fujimoto 83'	Stadium: Todoroki Athletics Stadium; Attendance: 16,292; Referee: Ryuji Sato

6 May 2013 Round 10	Nagoya Grampus	0–2	Vegalta Sendai	Toyota
19:00 JST (UTC+9)		Report	Kakuda 29'; Yanagisawa 59'	Stadium: Toyota Stadium; Attendance: 12,075; Referee: Jumpei Iida

11 May 2013 Round 11	Nagoya Grampus	1–2	Yokohama F. Marinos	Toyota
16:00 JST (UTC+9)	Kennedy 50' (pen.)	Report	Marquinhos 63'; Hyōdō 74'	Stadium: Toyota Stadium; Attendance: 18,512; Referee: Yuichi Nishimura

18 May 2013 Round 12	Kashima Antlers	3–1	Nagoya Grampus	Kashima
14:00 JST (UTC+9)	Endo 40'; Nakamura 66'; Osako 90+4'	Report	Ogawa 24'	Stadium: Kashima Soccer Stadium; Attendance: 17,161; Referee: Masaaki Iemoto Toma

25 May 2013 Round 13	Cerezo Osaka	2–1	Nagoya Grampus	Higashisumiyoshi-ku
19:00 JST (UTC+9)	Edno 57'; Fábio Simplício 67'	Report	Kennedy 90+1'	Stadium: Kincho Stadium; Attendance: 6,362; Referee: Hiroyuki Kimura

6 July 2013 Round 14	Nagoya Grampus	2–1	Shimizu S-Pulse	Toyota
19:00 JST (UTC+9)	Ogawa 9', 89'	Report	Muramatsu 13'	Stadium: Toyota Stadium; Attendance: 17,950; Referee: Futoshi Nakamura

10 July 2013 Round 15	Omiya Ardija	2–1	Nagoya Grampus	Ōmiya-ku
19:00 JST (UTC+9)	Novaković 62'; Hasegawa 65'	Report	Nakamura 7'	Stadium: NACK5 Stadium Omiya; Attendance: 9,644; Referee: Jumpei Iida

13 July 2013 Round 16	Nagoya Grampus	3–2	Sagan Tosu	Nagoya
19:00 JST (UTC+9)	Kennedy 12'; Tamada 61'; Fujimoto 81'	Report	Noda 39'; Toyoda 64'	Stadium: Mizuho Athletic Stadium; Attendance: 9,237; Referee: Minoru Tojo

17 July 2013 Round 17	Oita Trinita	1–2	Nagoya Grampus	Ōita, Ōita
19:00 JST (UTC+9)	Matsuda 78'	Report	Tamada 35'; Ogawa 67'	Stadium: Ōita Bank Dome; Attendance: 7,104; Referee: Nobutsugu Murakami

31 July 2013 Round 18	Nagoya Grampus	3–1	Kashima Antlers	Toyota
19:30 JST (UTC+9)	Kennedy 10' (pen.), 76'; Tamada 41'	Report	Shibasaki 90+3'	Stadium: Toyota Stadium; Attendance: 15,881; Referee: Yuichi Nishimura

3 August 2013 Round 19	Júbilo Iwata	2–3	Nagoya Grampus	Iwata
20:00 JST (UTC+9)	Yamada 29'; Kanazono 82'	Report	Ogawa 9'; Kennedy 62'; Tamada 81'	Stadium: Yamaha Stadium; Attendance: 14,272; Referee: Ryuji Sato

10 August 2013 Round 20	Nagoya Grampus	2–0	Urawa Red Diamonds	Toyota
20:00 JST (UTC+9)	Tamada 62'; Kennedy 81'	Report		Stadium: Toyota Stadium; Attendance: 30,478; Referee: Jumpei Iida

17 August 2013 Round 21	Sanfrecce Hiroshima	1–1	Nagoya Grampus	Hiroshima
20:00 JST (UTC+9)	Mikić 77'	Report	Tulio 90+1'	Stadium: Hiroshima Big Arch; Attendance: 20,879; Referee: Toma Maasaki

24 August 2013 Round 22	Nagoya Grampus	1–1	Cerezo Osaka	Nagoya
19:00 JST (UTC+9)	Yano 89'	Report	Kusukami 87'	Stadium: Mizuho Athletic Stadium; Attendance: 18,560; Referee: Toshimitsu Yoshida

28 August 2013 Round 23	Nagoya Grampus	2–1	Oita Trinita	Nagoya
19:00 JST (UTC+9)	Kennedy 75', 79'	Report	R.Matsuda 66'	Stadium: Mizuho Athletic Stadium; Attendance: 9,777; Referee: Takuto Okabe

31 August 2013 Round 24	Sagan Tosu	1–1	Nagoya Grampus	Tosu
19:00 JST (UTC+9)	Mizunuma 49'	Report	Masukawa 35'	Stadium: Tosu Stadium; Attendance: 15,569; Referee: Koichiro Fukushima

14 September 2013 Round 25	Shimizu S-Pulse	2–1	Nagoya Grampus	Shimizu
15:00 JST (UTC+9)	Radončić 59'; Omae 90+3'	Report	Masukawa 52'	Stadium: Outsourcing Stadium Nihondaira; Attendance: 13,189; Referee: Masaaki Toma

21 September 2013 Round 26	Nagoya Grampus	0–2	FC Tokyo	Nagoya
19:00 JST (UTC+9)		Report	Hasegawa 38'; Vučićević 88'	Stadium: Mizuho Athletic Stadium; Attendance: 13,329; Referee: Futoshi Nakamura

28 September 2013 Round 27	Nagoya Grampus	1–2	Kawasaki Frontale	Nagoya
19:30 JST (UTC+9)	H.Tanaka 90+6'	Report	Okubo 33'; Moriya 84'	Stadium: Mizuho Athletic Stadium; Attendance: 12,013; Referee: Minoru Tojo

5 October 2013 Round 28	Shonan Bellmare	1–1	Nagoya Grampus	Hiratsuka
16:00 JST (UTC+9)	Ono 83'	Report	Kennedy 75'; Tulio (red card) 90+4'	Stadium: Hiratsuka Athletics Stadium; Attendance: 8,650; Referee: Yuichi Nishimura

19 October 2013 Round 29	Vegalta Sendai	1–2	Nagoya Grampus	Izumi-ku
14:00 JST (UTC+9)	Wilson 45', 90+3'	Report	Tamada 56'	Stadium: Yurtec Stadium Sendai; Attendance: 15,178; Referee: Koichiro Fukushima

27 October 2013 Round 30	Nagoya Grampus	2–1	Omiya Ardija	Toyota
15:00 JST (UTC+9)	Tulio 67', 86'	Report	Novaković 37'	Stadium: Toyota Stadium; Attendance: 14,016; Referee: Kenji Ogiya

10 November 2013 Round 31	Yokohama F. Marinos	1–2	Nagoya Grampus	Yokohama
13:00 JST (UTC+9)	Hyōdō 51'	Report	Kennedy 9' (pen.); Fujimoto 53'	Stadium: Nissan Stadium; Attendance: 28,484; Referee: Ryuji Sato

23 November 2013 Round 32	Nagoya Grampus	3–2	Kashiwa Reysol	Toyota
17:00 JST (UTC+9)	Ogawa 19', 60'; Daniel 90+3'	Report	Ota 41'; Kudo 81'	Stadium: Toyota Stadium; Attendance: 17,483; Referee: Nobutsugu Murakami

30 November 2013 Round 33	Nagoya Grampus	0–0	Ventforet Kofu	Toyota
17:00 JST (UTC+9)		Report		Stadium: Toyota Stadium; Attendance: 26,369; Referee: Hajime Matsuo

7 December 2013 Round 34	Albirex Niigata	2–0	Nagoya Grampus	Niigata
15:30 JST (UTC+9)	Kawamata 65'; Tanaka 82'	Report		Stadium: Tohoku Denryoku Big Swan Stadium; Attendance: 30,504; Referee: Tomoya Maeda

==== League table ====
Pos	Team	Pld	W	D	L	GF	GA	GD	Pts
9	Shimizu S-Pulse	34	15	5	14	48	57	−9	50
10	Kashiwa Reysol	34	13	9	12	56	59	−3	48
11	Nagoya Grampus	34	13	8	13	47	48	−1	47
12	Sagan Tosu	34	13	7	14	54	63	−9	46
13	Vegalta Sendai	34	11	12	11	41	38	+3	45

Updated to match(es) played on 7 December 2013. Source: J.League Division 1
Rules for classification: 1) points; 2) goal difference; 3) number of goals scored.

=== J.League Cup ===
Team	Pld	W	D	L	GF	GA	GD	Pts
Cerezo Osaka	6	4	1	1	10	7	+3	13
Kashima Antlers	6	4	0	2	8	7	+1	12
FC Tokyo	6	2	3	1	7	5	+2	9
Nagoya Grampus	6	2	3	1	6	5	+1	9
Oita Trinita	6	1	3	2	6	7	−1	6
Sagan Tosu	6	1	1	4	6	8	−2	4
Albirex Niigata	6	1	1	4	6	10	−4	4

20 March 2013 Group A	Nagoya Grampus	1–1	Cerezo Osaka	Nagoya
16:00 JST (UTC+9)	Tamada 69'	report	Kakitani 47'	Stadium: Mizuho Athletic Stadium; Attendance: 8,032; Referee: Koichiro Fukushima

23 March 2013 Group A	Sagan Tosu	1–2	Nagoya Grampus	Tosu
16:00 JST (UTC+9)	Ikeda 19'	Report	Jakimovski 15'; Yano 75'	Stadium: Tosu Stadium; Attendance: 5,926; Referee: Toshimitsu Yoshida

3 April 2013 Group A	F.C. Tokyo	0–0	Nagoya Grampus	Chōfu
19:00 JST (UTC+9)	Hirayama (yellow card) 72'	Report	Tanaka (yellow card) 85'	Stadium: Ajinomoto Stadium; Attendance: 9,900; Referee: Hajime Matsuo

10 April 2013 Group A	Nagoya Grampus	1–1	Oita Trinita	Nagoya
19:00 JST (UTC+9)	H.Tanaka 61' (pen.)	Report	Morishima 19'	Stadium: Mizuho Athletic Stadium; Attendance: 4,601; Referee: Yudai Yamamoto

24 April 2013 Group A	Kashima Antlers	1–0	Nagoya Grampus	Kashima
19:00 JST (UTC+9)	Juninho 23'; Iwamasa (yellow card) 59' (yellow-red card) 87'	report		Stadium: Kashima Soccer Stadium; Attendance: 4,375; Referee: Hajime Matsuo

22 May 2013 Group A	Nagoya Grampus	2–1	Albirex Niigata	Nagoya
19:00 JST (UTC+9)	Léo Silva 3' (o.g.); Tamada 24'	report	Léo Silva 41'	Stadium: Mizuho Athletic Stadium; Attendance: 4,106; Referee: Tomoya Maeda

=== Emperor's Cup ===
8 September 2013 Second Round	Nagoya Grampus	0–2	A.C. Nagano Parceiro	Nagoya
15:00 JST (UTC+9)	Ishibitsu (red card) 58'	Report	Sato 13'; Arinaga 41'	Stadium: Nagoya City Minato Soccer Stadium; Attendance: 3,134; Referee: Takehiro Yamamoto

== Squad statistics ==
As of 9 December 2013

=== Appearances and goals ===
No.	Pos	Nat	Player	Total		J-League		J-League Cup		Emperor's Cup	
No.	Pos	Nat	Player	Apps	Goals	Apps	Goals	Apps	Goals	Apps	Goals
1	GK	(Japan) JPN	Seigo Narazaki	41	0	34+0	0	6+0	0	1+0	0
3	DF	(Japan) JPN	Yusuke Muta	8	0	7+1	0	0+0	0	0+0	0
4	DF	(Japan) JPN	Tulio	31	5	27+0	4	4+0	1	0+0	0
5	DF	(Japan) JPN	Takahiro Masukawa	35	3	26+2	3	6+0	0	1+0	0
6	DF	(Japan) JPN	Shohei Abe	38	0	29+3	0	5+0	0	1+0	0
7	MF	(Japan) JPN	Naoshi Nakamura	23	1	19+1	1	0+3	0	0+0	0
8	MF	(Japan) JPN	Jungo Fujimoto	31	3	26+2	3	2+0	0	1+0	0
9	MF	(North Macedonia) MKD	Nikola Jakimovski	22	1	6+9	0	4+2	1	1+0	0
10	MF	(Japan) JPN	Yoshizumi Ogawa	38	9	31+2	9	4+0	0	0+1	0
11	FW	(Japan) JPN	Keiji Tamada	38	10	26+5	8	5+1	2	0+1	0
13	MF	(Japan) JPN	Ryota Isomura	9	0	3+3	0	3+0	0	0+0	0
15	DF	(Japan) JPN	Yuki Honda	7	1	5+0	1	2+0	0	0+0	0
16	FW	(Australia) AUS	Joshua Kennedy	29	12	25+2	12	1+1	0	0+0	0
18	FW	(Japan) JPN	Kensuke Nagai	15	0	7+7	0	0+0	0	1+0	0
19	FW	(Japan) JPN	Kisho Yano	35	2	9+20	1	4+1	1	1+0	0
20	MF	(Colombia) COL	Danilson Córdoba	36	0	27+2	0	5+1	0	1+0	0
22	DF	(Brazil) BRA	Daniel	27	1	9+15	1	2+0	0	1+0	0
23	DF	(Japan) JPN	Yōsuke Ishibitsu	3	0	0+1	0	1+0	0	1+0	0
24	DF	(Japan) JPN	Nikki Havenaar	2	0	0+1	0	0+1	0	0+0	0
25	MF	(Japan) JPN	Reo Mochizuki	1	0	0+0	0	0+1	0	0+0	0
27	MF	(Japan) JPN	Ryota Tanabe	8	0	0+4	0	2+2	0	0+0	0
28	MF	(Japan) JPN	Taishi Taguchi	30	0	18+7	0	2+2	0	1+0	0
32	DF	(Japan) JPN	Hayuma Tanaka	39	1	34+0	1	5+0	0	0+0	0
35	MF	(Japan) JPN	Teruki Tanaka	23	2	6+10	2	4+2	0	0+1	0
Players who left Nagoya Grampus during the season:

=== Goal Scorers ===
Place	Position	Nation	Number	Name	J-League	J-League Cup	Emperor's Cup	Total
1	FW	(Australia)	16	Joshua Kennedy	12	0	0	12
2	FW	(Japan)	11	Keiji Tamada	9	2	0	11
3	MF	(Japan)	10	Yoshizumi Ogawa	9	0	0	9
4	DF	(Japan)	4	Tulio	4	1	0	5
5	DF	(Japan)	5	Takahiro Masukawa	3	0	0	3
5	MF	(Japan)	8	Jungo Fujimoto	3	0	0	3
7	MF	(Japan)	35	Teruki Tanaka	2	0	0	2
7	FW	(Japan)	19	Kisho Yano	1	1	0	2
9	DF	(Japan)	15	Yuki Honda	1	0	0	1
9	DF	(Japan)	32	Hayuma Tanaka	1	0	0	1
9	MF	(Japan)	7	Naoshi Nakamura	1	0	0	1
9	DF	(Brazil)	22	Daniel	1	0	0	1
9	MF	(North Macedonia)	9	Nikola Jakimovski	0	1	0	1
9				Own goal	0	1	0	1
				TOTALS	47	6	0	53

=== Disciplinary record ===
Number	Nation	Position	Name	J-League		J. League Cup		Emperor's Cup		Total	
Number	Nation	Position	Name	Yellow card	Red card	Yellow card	Red card	Yellow card	Red card	Yellow card	Red card
1	(Japan)	GK	Seigo Narazaki	1	0	0	0	0	0	1	0
4	(Japan)	DF	Tulio	4	1	1	0	0	0	5	1
5	(Japan)	DF	Takahiro Masukawa	7	0	1	0	0	0	8	0
6	(Japan)	DF	Shohei Abe	1	0	0	0	0	0	1	0
7	(Japan)	MF	Naoshi Nakamura	6	0	0	0	0	0	6	0
8	(Japan)	DF	Jungo Fujimoto	5	0	0	0	0	0	5	0
9	(North Macedonia)	MF	Nikola Jakimovski	2	0	1	0	0	0	3	0
10	(Japan)	MF	Yoshizumi Ogawa	3	0	0	0	0	0	3	0
11	(Japan)	FW	Keiji Tamada	1	0	0	0	0	0	1	0
13	(Japan)	MF	Ryota Isomura	2	0	2	0	0	0	4	0
15	(Japan)	DF	Yuki Honda	2	0	0	0	0	0	2	0
16	(Australia)	FW	Joshua Kennedy	6	0	0	0	0	0	6	0
18	(Japan)	FW	Kensuke Nagai	2	0	0	0	0	0	2	0
19	(Japan)	FW	Kisho Yano	3	0	0	0	0	0	3	0
20	(Colombia)	MF	Danilson Córdoba	5	0	0	0	1	0	6	0
22	(Brazil)	DF	Daniel	5	0	1	0	1	0	7	0
23	(Japan)	DF	Yōsuke Ishibitsu	0	0	0	0	0	1	0	1
28	(Japan)	MF	Taishi Taguchi	5	1	1	0	0	0	6	1
32	(Japan)	DF	Hayuma Tanaka	2	0	1	0	0	0	3	0
35	(Japan)	MF	Teruki Tanaka	0	0	1	0	0	0	1	0
			TOTALS	62	2	9	0	2	1	73	3
