= Koki Sugimori =

Japanese footballer (born 1997)

Koki Sugimori 杉森 考起
Personal information
- Full name: Koki Sugimori
- Date of birth: 5 April 1997 (age 29)
- Place of birth: Kasugai, Aichi, Japan
- Height: 1.71 m (5 ft 7 in)
- Position: Forward

Team information
- Current team: Tochigi SC
- Number: 17

Youth career
- Nagoya Grampus

Senior career*
Years	Team	Apps	(Gls)
2014–2020	Nagoya Grampus	34	(2)
2014–2015	→ J. League U-22 (loan)	14	(5)
2018	→ Machida Zelvia (loan)	29	(3)
2020	→ Tokushima Vortis (loan)	34	(3)
2021–2025	Tokushima Vortis	111	(6)
2025	Ehime FC	13	(2)
2026–	Tochigi SC	18	(0)

International career
2013	Japan U-17	2	(0)
2013–2015	Japan U-18 / U-19		
Medal record
Representing Japan
AFC U-16 Championship
Silver medal – second place	2012 Iran
- * Club domestic league appearances and goals as of 17 August 2026

Koki Sugimori (杉森 考起, Sugimori Kōki; born 5 April 1997 in Kasugai, Aichi, Japan) is a Japanese footballer who is a forward for Tochigi SC.

== Club career ==
Sugimori made his official debut for Nagoya Grampus in the J1 League, J.League Cup on 19 March 2014 against Ventforet Kofu in Mizuho Athletic Stadium in Nagoya, Japan. He subbed in the match in the 84th minute replacing Riki Matsuda. Sugimori and his club lost the match 1-0.

== National team career ==
In October 2013, Sugimori was elected Japan U-17 national team for 2013 U-17 World Cup. He played 2 matches.

== Career statistics ==
As of match played 21 February 2019

Appearances and goals by club, season and competition
Club	Season	League			National Cup		League Cup		Other		Total	
Club	Season	Division	Apps	Goals	Apps	Goals	Apps	Goals	Apps	Goals	Apps	Goals
Nagoya Grampus	2014	J1 League	0	0	1	0	1	0	-		2	0
Nagoya Grampus	2015	J1 League	4	0	1	0	2	0	-		7	0
Nagoya Grampus	2016	J1 League	1	0	0	0	3	0	-		4	0
Nagoya Grampus	2017	J2 League	26	2	2	1	-		0	0	28	3
Machida Zelvia	2018	J2 League	29	3	2	0	-		-		31	3
Career total			60	5	6	1	6	0	0	0	72	6
