= Shun Obu =

Japanese footballer (born 1992)

Personal information
- Full name: Shun Obu
- Date of birth: 24 November 1992 (age 33)
- Place of birth: Chikuzen, Fukuoka, Japan
- Height: 1.88 m (6 ft 2 in)
- Position: Center-back

Team information
- Current team: Tegevajaro Miyazaki
- Number: 4

Youth career
- 2008–2010: Chikuyo Gakuen High School

College career
Years	Team	Apps	(Gls)
2011–2014	Fukuoka University		

Senior career*
Years	Team	Apps	(Gls)
2014–2017	Nagoya Grampus	40	(0)
2017–2019	Albirex Niigata	66	(4)
2020–2021	Júbilo Iwata	8	(0)
2021	Thespakusatsu Gunma	14	(0)
2022–2023	Fukushima United	66	(6)
2024–	Tegevajaro Miyazaki	0	(0)
- * Club domestic league appearances and goals as of 15:21, 2 January 2024 (AEST)

Shun Obu (大武 峻, Ōbu Shun; born 24 November 1992 in Chikuzen, Fukuoka, Japan) is a Japanese footballer who since 2014 has played defender for Tegevajaro Miyazaki.

== Career ==
=== Nagoya Grampus ===
Obu made his official debut for Nagoya Grampus in the J. League Division 1 on 23 July 2014 against Vegalta Sendai in Yurtec Stadium Sendai in Sendai. He played the full match in where his team recorded a 3-3 tie.

=== Albirex Niigata ===
On 23 June 2017, Obu moved to Albirex Niigata from Nagoya Grampus.

== Career statistics ==
=== Club ===
Updated to end of 2018 season.

Appearances and goals by club, season and competition
Club	Season	League			National Cup		League Cup		Continental		Other		Total	
Club	Season	Division	Apps	Goals	Apps	Goals	Apps	Goals	Apps	Goals	Apps	Goals	Apps	Goals
Nagoya Grampus	2014	J1 League	13	0	0	0	1	0	–		–		14	0
Nagoya Grampus	2015	J1 League	6	0	1	0	2	0	–		–		9	0
Nagoya Grampus	2016	J1 League	20	0	1	0	5	0	–		–		16	0
Nagoya Grampus	2017	J2 League	1	0	0	0	–		–		–		1	0
Albirex Niigata	2017	J1 League	9	0	0	0	–		–		–		9	0
Albirex Niigata	2018	J2 League	15	0	2	0	6	1	–		–		23	1
Career total			64	0	4	0	14	1	-	-	-	-	82	1
