= Ryota Aoki (footballer, born 1996) =

Japanese footballer

Personal information
- Full name: Ryota Aoki
- Date of birth: 6 March 1996 (age 30)
- Place of birth: Machida, Tokyo, Japan
- Height: 1.70 m (5 ft 7 in)
- Position: Attacking midfielder

Team information
- Current team: Hokkaido Consadole Sapporo
- Number: 11

Youth career
- Tsurukawa FC
- Tokyo Verdy
- 2011–2013: RKU Kashiwa High School

Senior career*
Years	Team	Apps	(Gls)
2014–2020	Nagoya Grampus	50	(11)
2014	→ J.League U-22 Selection (loan)	7	(0)
2020	→ Omiya Ardija (loan)	10	(0)
2021–	Hokkaido Consadole Sapporo	155	(23)
- * Club domestic league appearances and goals as of 13 August 2026

Ryota Aoki (青木 亮太, Aoki Ryōta; born 6 March 1996) is a Japanese football player for J1 League club Hokkaido Consadole Sapporo.

== Career ==
On 23 October 2020, Aoki was announced at Omiya Ardija on loan.

== Career statistics ==
=== Club ===
As of 21 February 2019

Appearances and goals by club, season and competition
Club	Season	League			National Cup		League Cup		Continental		Other		Total	
Club	Season	Division	Apps	Goals	Apps	Goals	Apps	Goals	Apps	Goals	Apps	Goals	Apps	Goals
Nagoya Grampus	2014	J1 League	4	0	1	0	0	0	-		-		5	0
Nagoya Grampus	2015	J1 League	0	0	0	0	0	0	-		-		0	0
Nagoya Grampus	2016	J1 League	1	0	0	0	0	0	-		-		1	0
Nagoya Grampus	2017	J2 League	26	11	2	2	-		-		2	0	30	13
Nagoya Grampus	2018	J1 League	18	0	0	0	2	1	-		-		20	1
Nagoya Grampus	Total		49	11	3	2	2	1	-	-	2	0	56	14
Career total			49	11	3	2	2	1	-	-	2	0	56	14
