= Asahi Yada =

Japanese footballer

Personal information
- Full name: Asahi Yada
- Date of birth: 2 April 1991 (age 35)
- Place of birth: Yokkaichi, Mie, Japan
- Height: 1.70 m (5 ft 7 in)
- Position: Midfielder

Team information
- Current team: Giravanz Kitakyushu
- Number: 20

Youth career
- Oyamada SS
- Nagoya Grampus

College career
Years	Team	Apps	(Gls)
2010–2013	Meiji University		

Senior career*
Years	Team	Apps	(Gls)
2014–2017	Nagoya Grampus	94	(6)
2017	→ JEF United Chiba (loan)	17	(2)
2018–2021	JEF United Chiba	131	(5)
2022-2024	Ehime FC	54	(4)
2024-	Giravanz Kitakyushu	27	(0)
- * Club domestic league appearances and goals as of 1 January 2026

Asahi Yada (矢田 旭, Yada Asahi; born 2 April 1991) is a Japanese footballer who since 2014 has played as a midfielder for Giravanz Kitakyushu in J3 League.

== Career ==
=== Nagoya Grampus ===
Yada made his official debut for Nagoya Grampus in the J. League Division 1 on 25 April 2014 against Sagan Tosu in Mizuho Athletic Stadium in Nagoya, Japan. He subbed in for Riki Matsuda in the 66th minutes and played the rest of the game. Yada and his club lost the match 2-3 due to a last minute goal scored by Hiroyuki Taniguchi

== Career statistics ==
=== Club ===
Updated to end of 2018 season.

Appearances and goals by club, season and competition
Club	Season	League			National Cup		League Cup		Continental		Total	
Club	Season	Division	Apps	Goals	Apps	Goals	Apps	Goals	Apps	Goals	Apps	Goals
Nagoya Grampus	2014	J1 League	22	1	4	1	5	1	-		31	3
Nagoya Grampus	2015	J1 League	34	1	0	0	8	2	-		42	3
Nagoya Grampus	2016	J1 League	13	0	0	0	5	0	-		18	0
Nagoya Grampus	2017	J2 League	0	0	1	0	-		-		1	0
JEF United Chiba	2017	J2 League	17	2	-		-		-		17	2
JEF United Chiba	2018	J2 League	40	2	1	0	-		-		41	2
Career total			126	6	6	1	18	3	-	-	150	10
