= Tomoya Koyamatsu =

Japanese footballer

Tomoya Koyamatsu 小屋松知哉
Personal information
- Full name: Tomoya Koyamatsu
- Date of birth: 24 April 1995 (age 31)
- Place of birth: Kumiyama, Kyoto, Japan
- Height: 1.71 m (5 ft 7 in)
- Positions: Attacking midfielder; winger

Team information
- Current team: Nagoya Grampus
- Number: 58

Youth career
- 2002–2007: Kumiyama Bisons
- 2008–2010: Uji FC
- 2011–2013: Kyoto Tachibana High School

Senior career*
Years	Team	Apps	(Gls)
2014–2016	Nagoya Grampus	29	(1)
2014	→ J.League U-22 (loan)	3	(2)
2017–2019	Kyoto Sanga	116	(22)
2020–2021	Sagan Tosu	70	(8)
2022–2025	Kashiwa Reysol	136	(8)
2026–	Nagoya Grampus	0	(0)
- * Club domestic league appearances and goals as of 14:10, 23 March 2026 (UTC)

Tomoya Koyamatsu (小屋松 知哉, Koyamatsu Tomoya; born 24 April 1995 in Kumiyama, Kyoto) is a Japanese professional footballer who plays as an attacking midfielder or a winger for J1 League club Nagoya Grampus.

== Career ==
=== Nagoya Grampus ===
Koyamatsu made his official debut for Nagoya Grampus in the J. League Division 1 on 7 March 2015 (JST) against Matsumoto Yamaga FC by scoring a goal, which was his premiere goal as a J League football player as well. He also started the match against Ventforet Kofu in Yamanashi Chuo Bank Stadium in Kofu, Japan on 14 March. However, he was subbed out in the 70th minute replaced by Kengo Kawamata, then Koyamatsu and his club lost the match 1–0.

== Career statistics ==
=== Club ===
As of 23 March 2026

Appearances and goals by club, season and competition
Club	Season	League			National cup (Note: Includes Emperors Cup)		League cup (Note: Includes J.League Cup)		Total	
Club	Season	Division	Apps	Goals	Apps	Goals	Apps	Goals	Apps	Goals
Nagoya Grampus	2014	J.League Division 1	1	0	0	0	2	0	3	0
Nagoya Grampus	2015	J1 League	22	1	1	0	5	1	28	2
Nagoya Grampus	2016	J1 League	6	0	0	0	4	1	10	1
Nagoya Grampus	Total		29	1	1	0	11	2	41	3
J.League U-22 Selection (loan)	2014	J3 League	3	2	–		–		3	2
Kyoto Sanga F.C.	2017	J2 League	38	8	1	0	–		39	8
Kyoto Sanga F.C.	2018	J2 League	36	5	0	0	–		36	5
Kyoto Sanga F.C.	2019	J2 League	42	9	1	0	–		43	9
Kyoto Sanga F.C.	Total		116	22	2	0	0	0	118	22
Sagan Tosu	2020	J1 League	33	2	0	0	1	0	34	2
Sagan Tosu	2021	J1 League	37	6	3	0	2	0	42	6
Sagan Tosu	Total		70	8	3	0	3	0	76	8
Kashiwa Reysol	2022	J1 League	33	4	2	0	3	0	38	4
Kashiwa Reysol	2023	J1 League	33	1	4	0	2	0	39	1
Kashiwa Reysol	2024	J1 League	33	0	1	0	3	0	37	0
Kashiwa Reysol	2025	J1 League	37	3	1	0	7	0	45	3
Kashiwa Reysol	Total		136	8	8	0	15	0	159	8
Career total			354	41	14	0	29	2	397	43
