= Gustavo (footballer, born June 1996) =

Brazilian footballer

Personal information
- Full name: Gustavo Santos Costa
- Date of birth: 25 June 1996 (age 30)
- Place of birth: Sergipe, Brazil
- Height: 1.77 m (5 ft 10 in)
- Position: Forward

Team information
- Current team: Botafogo PB
- Number: 19

Youth career
- 2011–2015: Bahia

Senior career*
| Years | Team | Apps | (Gls) |
| 2014–2017 | Bahia | 0 | (0) |
| 2014–2016 | → Nagoya Grampus (loan) | 15 | (0) |
| 2017 | → Roasso Kumamoto (loan) | 30 | (5) |
| 2018 | Ho Chi Minh City | 2 | (1) |
| 2019 | Juazeirense | 11 | (4) |
| 2019 | → CRB (loan) | 3 | (0) |
| 2019–2020 | Apollon Larissa | 18 | (4) |
| 2020 | Jacuipense | 1 | (0) |
| 2021 | Sete de Setembro | 5 | (0) |
| 2021 | Serrano | 15 | (4) |
| 2022 | Saigon | 7 | (3) |
| 2022 | Dong A Thanh Hoa | 11 | (2) |
| 2023 | Dornbirn 1913 | 13 | (8) |
| 2023–2024 | Rheindorf Altach | 37 | (10) |
| 2025– | Vegalta Sendai | 5 | (0) |
| 2026– | →Botafogo PB (loan) | 8 | (0) |
- * Club domestic league appearances and goals as of 03 September 2026

Gustavo Santos Costa (born 25 June 1996), most commonly known as Gustavo, is a Brazilian footballer who plays as forward for Botafogo PB loaned by Vegalta Sendai.

== Career ==
=== Nagoya Grampus ===
Gustavo made his official debut for Nagoya Grampus in the J. League Division 1 on 18 October 2014 against Sanfrecce Hiroshima in Hiroshima Big Arch in Hiroshima, Japan. He subbed in the match in the 72nd minute replacing Riki Matsuda. Gustavo and his club lost the match 4-0. Gustavo was released by Nagoya Grampus, along with 8 other players, on 10 November 2016 following the club's relegation to J2 League.

=== Roasso Kumamoto ===
On 19 December 2016, Nagoya Grampus announced that Gustavo had joined J2 League side Roasso Kumamoto.

=== Đông Á Thanh Hóa ===
On 15 August 2022, Đông Á Thanh Hóa announced that Gustavo had joined 2022 V.League 1 for half of the season, he was replaced for Victor Kamhuka. He played 11 games and had 2 goals.

=== Dornbirn 1913 ===
On 26 January 2023, Dornbirn 1913 announced that Gustavo had joined 2023–24 Austrian Football Second League for a season.

=== Rheindorf Altach ===
For the 2023–24 season, Gustavo moved to Rheindorf Altach on a two-year contract with an optional third year.

=== Vegalta Sendai ===
On 23 December 2024, Rheindorf Altach announced that Gustavo will return to Japan and join Vegalta Sendai.

== Career statistics ==
As of match played 18 August 2024

| Club | Season | League | | | State league (Note: Includes Campeonato Baiano, Campeonato Alagoano) | | National cup (Note: Includes Emperor's Cup, Copa do Brasil, Greek Football Cup, Austrian Cup) | | Other | | Total | |
| Club | Season | Division | Apps | Goals | Apps | Goals | Apps | Goals | Apps | Goals | Apps | Goals |
|---|---|---|---|---|---|---|---|---|---|---|---|---|
| Nagoya Grampus (loan) | 2014 | J1 League | 3 | 0 | – | | 0 | 0 | – | | 3 | 0 |
| Nagoya Grampus (loan) | 2015 | J1 League | 6 | 0 | – | | 2 | 0 | – | | 8 | 0 |
| Nagoya Grampus (loan) | 2016 | J1 League | 2 | 0 | – | | 2 | 0 | – | | 4 | 0 |
| Nagoya Grampus (loan) | Total | | 11 | 0 | – | | 4 | 0 | – | | 15 | 0 |
| Roasso Kumamoto (loan) | 2017 | J2 League | 29 | 5 | – | | 0 | 0 | – | | 29 | 5 |
| Hồ Chí Minh City | 2018 | V.League 1 | 2 | 1 | – | | 0 | 0 | – | | 2 | 1 |
| Juazeirense | 2019 | Série D | 7 | 0 | 4 | 4 | 1 | 1 | – | | 12 | 5 |
| CRB (loan) | 2019 | Série B | 0 | 0 | 2 | 0 | – | | 1 (Note: Appearance in Copa do Nordeste) | 0 | 3 | 0 |
| Apollon Larissa | 2019–20 | Super League Greece 2 | 18 | 4 | – | | 1 | 0 | – | | 19 | 4 |
| Sài Gòn | 2022 | V.League 1 | 7 | 3 | – | | 1 | 0 | – | | 8 | 3 |
| Đông Á Thanh Hóa | 2022 | V.League 1 | 11 | 2 | – | | 0 | 0 | – | | 11 | 2 |
| Dornbirn 1913 | 2023–24 | Austrian Football Second League | 13 | 8 | – | | 0 | 0 | – | | 13 | 8 |
| Rheindorf Altach | 2023–24 | Austrian Bundesliga | 23 | 4 | – | | 2 | 1 | – | | 25 | 5 |
| Rheindorf Altach | 2024–25 | Austrian Bundesliga | 3 | 5 | – | | 0 | 0 | – | | 3 | 5 |
| Rheindorf Altach | Total | | 26 | 9 | – | | 2 | 1 | – | | 28 | 10 |
| Career total | | | 124 | 32 | 6 | 4 | 9 | 2 | 1 | 0 | 140 | 38 |
