= Régis (footballer, born November 1989) =

Brazilian footballer

Personal information
- Full name: Régis dos Santos Silva
- Date of birth: 20 November 1989 (age 36)
- Place of birth: São Paulo, Brazil
- Height: 1.86 m (6 ft 1 in)
- Position: Defensive midfielder

Team information
- Current team: Aimoré

Youth career
- 2006: Nacional Atlético
- 2007–2009: Fortaleza

Senior career*
Years	Team	Apps	(Gls)
2008–2011	Fortaleza	25	(5)
2008	→ Aracati (loan)		
2012–2013	Ceará	28	(4)
2013–2014	Atlético Goianiense	19	(0)
2014	→ Nagoya Grampus (loan)	6	(0)
2015	Fortaleza	0	(0)
2015–2016	Atlético Goianiense	4	(0)
2016	Marítimo	0	(0)
2017	Mogi Mirim	17	(2)
2018	Caxias	2	(0)
2019	São Luiz	0	(0)
2019–	Aimoré		
- * Club domestic league appearances and goals as of 16:54, 2 January 2020 (UTC)

Régis dos Santos Silva (born 20 November 1989), simply known as Régis, is a Brazilian professional footballer who plays as a midfielder for Clube Esportivo Aimoré.

== Career ==
In January 2014, Régis moved on a season-long loan deal to J1 League side Nagoya Grampus.

== Career statistics ==
Statistics accurate as of match played 6 December 2014

Club	Season	League		Cup^{1}		League Cup^{2}		Continental^{3}		Total	
Club	Season	Apps	Goals	Apps	Goals	Apps	Goals	Apps	Goals	Apps	Goals
Nagoya Grampus	2014	6	0	1	0	1	0	-		8	0
Nagoya Grampus	Total	6	0	1	0	1	0	0	0	8	0
Career Total		6	0	1	0	1	0	0	0	8	0

^{1}Includes Emperor's Cup.

^{2}Includes J.League Cup.

^{3}Includes AFC Champions League.
