= Reo Mochizuki =

Japanese footballer

Reo Mochizuki 望月 嶺臣
Personal information
- Full name: Reo Mochizuki
- Date of birth: 18 January 1995 (age 31)
- Place of birth: Ryuo, Shiga, Japan
- Height: 1.67 m (5 ft 6 in)
- Position: Midfielder

Team information
- Current team: Veertien Mie
- Number: 25

Youth career
- 2010–2012: Yasu High School

Senior career*
Years	Team	Apps	(Gls)
2013–2016	Nagoya Grampus	6	(0)
2014–2015	→ J.League U-22 Selection (loan)	13	(0)
2016	→ Renofa Yamaguchi (loan)	10	(1)
2017–2019	Kyoto Sanga	27	(1)
2020–	Veertien Mie	2	(0)

International career
2011	Japan U-17	3	(0)
- * Club domestic league appearances and goals as of 12:16, 7 September 2020 (UTC)

Reo Mochizuki (望月 嶺臣, Mochizuki Reo; born 18 January 1995) is a Japanese footballer who plays as midfielder for Veertien Mie.

== Club career ==
Mochizuki made his official debut for Nagoya Grampus in the J1 League, J.League Cup on 24 April 2013 against Kashima Antlers in Kashima Soccer Stadium in Kashima, Japan. He was subbed in the match in the 46th minute for Ryota Isomura. Koyamatsu and his club lost the match 1–0. After one year on loan at Renofa Yamaguchi, he came back to Nagoya just to quit Grampus and sign a new deal with Kyoto Sanga.

After three seasons in Kyoto, he opted to join Veertien Mie in January 2020.

== National team career ==
In June 2011, Mochizuki was elected Japan U-17 national team for 2011 U-17 World Cup and he played 3 matches.

== Career statistics ==
Updated to 3 January 2020.

Appearances and goals by club, season and competition
Club	Season	League			Emperor's Cup		J.League Cup		Total	
Club	Season	Division	Apps	Goals	Apps	Goals	Apps	Goals	Apps	Goals
Nagoya Grampus	2013	J1 League	0	0	1	0	0	0	1	0
Nagoya Grampus	2014	J1 League	3	0	2	0	0	0	5	0
Nagoya Grampus	2015	J1 League	3	0	1	0	3	0	7	0
Renofa Yamaguchi	2016	J2 League	10	1	1	0	–		11	1
Kyoto Sanga	2017	J2 League	19	1	0	0	–		19	1
Kyoto Sanga	2018	J2 League	8	0	1	0	–		9	0
Kyoto Sanga	2019	J2 League	8	0	1	0	–		9	0
Career total			51	2	7	0	3	0	61	2
