= Ryosuke Tone =

Japanese footballer

Ryosuke Tone 刀根 亮輔
Personal information
- Full name: Ryosuke Tone
- Date of birth: 29 October 1991 (age 35)
- Place of birth: Kitakyūshū, Fukuoka, Japan
- Height: 1.80 m (5 ft 11 in)
- Position: Centre back

Team information
- Current team: Oita Trinita
- Number: 41

Youth career
- 2007–2009: Oita Trinita Youth

Senior career*
Years	Team	Apps	(Gls)
2010–2011	Oita Trinita	43	(2)
2012–2013	Tokyo Verdy	37	(1)
2014	Nagoya Grampus	3	(0)
2015	V-Varen Nagasaki	21	(0)
2016–2017	Giravanz Kitakyushu	45	(2)
2018–	Oita Trinita	17	(0)
- * Club domestic league appearances and goals as of 16 December 2018

Ryosuke Tone (刀根 亮輔, Tone Ryousuke; born 29 October 1991) is a Japanese football player currently playing for Oita Trinita.

== Club statistics ==
Updated to 25 February 2019.

Club performance			League		Cup		League Cup		Total	
Season	Club	League	Apps	Goals	Apps	Goals	Apps	Goals	Apps	Goals
Japan			League		Emperor's Cup		League Cup		Total	
2010	Oita Trinita	J2 League	21	2	1	0	-		22	2
2011	Oita Trinita	J2 League	22	0	0	0	–		22	0
2012	Tokyo Verdy	J2 League	8	0	1	0	–		9	0
2013	Tokyo Verdy	J2 League	29	1	0	0	–		29	1
2014	Nagoya Grampus	J1 League	3	0	0	0	1	0	4	0
2015	V-Varen Nagasaki	J2 League	21	0	2	0	–		23	0
2016	Giravanz Kitakyushu	J2 League	17	0	0	0	–		17	0
2017	Giravanz Kitakyushu	J3 League	28	2	0	0	–		28	2
2018	Oita Trinita	J1 League	17	0	0	0	–		17	0
Career total			166	5	4	0	1	0	171	5
