= Masataka Nomura =

Japanese footballer (born 1991)

Masataka Nomura 野村政孝
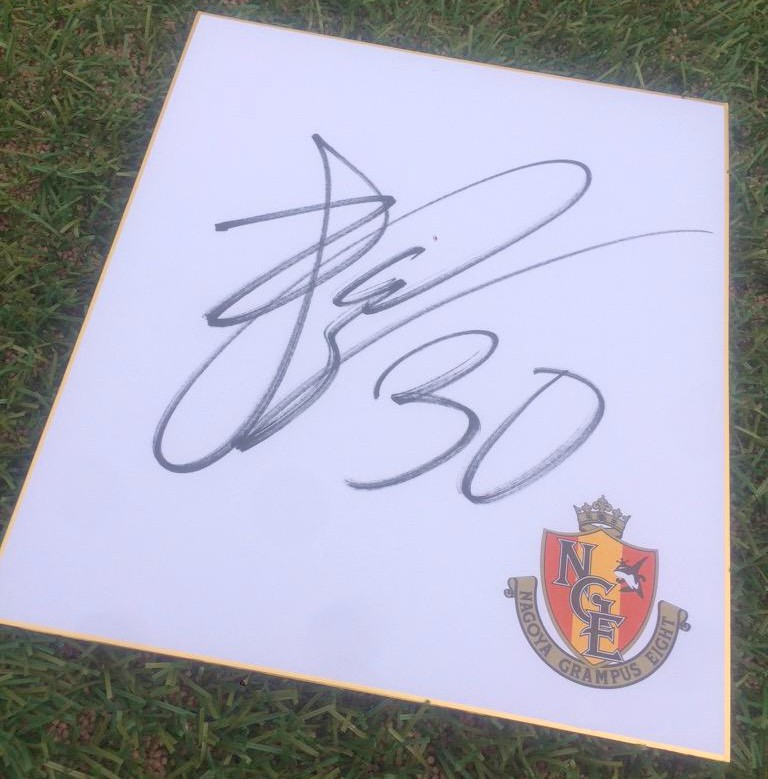
- Autograph in 2015

Personal information
- Full name: Masataka Nomura
- Date of birth: 29 June 1991 (age 35)
- Place of birth: Setagaya, Japan
- Height: 1.88 m (6 ft 2 in)
- Position: Goalkeeper

Team information
- Current team: Roasso Kumamoto
- Number: 21

Youth career
- 2010–2013: Komazawa University

Senior career*
Years	Team	Apps	(Gls)
2014–2016	Nagoya Grampus	0	(0)
2016	→ Blaublitz Akita (loan)	0	(0)
2017–	Roasso Kumamoto	10	(0)
- * Club domestic league appearances and goals as of 23 February 2018

Masataka Nomura (野村政孝, Nomura, Masataka; born 29 June 1991 in Setagaya) is a Japanese footballer who plays for Roasso Kumamoto.

== Career statistics ==
Updated to 23 February 2018.

Appearances and goals by club, season and competition
Club	Season	League			Emperor's Cup		J.League Cup		Total	
Club	Season	Division	Apps	Goals	Apps	Goals	Apps	Goals	Apps	Goals
Nagoya Grampus	2014	J1 League	0	0	0	0	0	0	0	0
Nagoya Grampus	2015	J1 League	0	0	1	0	0	0	1	0
Blaublitz Akita	2016	J3 League	0	0	0	0	—		0	0
Roasso Kumamoto	2017	J2 League	10	0	1	0	—		11	0
Career total			10	0	2	0	0	0	12	0
