= Teruki Tanaka =

Japanese footballer

Personal information
- Full name: Teruki Tanaka
- Date of birth: 26 August 1992 (age 34)
- Place of birth: Tokyo, Japan
- Height: 1.83 m (6 ft 0 in)
- Positions: Midfielder; forward

Team information
- Current team: V-Varen Nagasaki
- Number: 14

Youth career
- 2005–2010: Mitsubishi Yowa

Senior career*
Years	Team	Apps	(Gls)
2011–2015	Nagoya Grampus	43	(3)
2014	→ Oita Trinita (loan)	9	(0)
2016–	V-Varen Nagasaki	9	(0)
Medal record
Nagoya Grampus
Runner-up	J1 League	2011
- * Club domestic league appearances and goals as of 23 February 2017

Teruki Tanaka (田中 輝希, Tanaka Teruki; born 26 August 1992) is a Japanese football player who lastly played as midfielder for V-Varen Nagasaki.

== Career statistics ==
Updated to 23 February 2017.

Club	Season	League		Emperor's Cup		J. League Cup		Asia		Total	
Club	Season	Apps	Goals	Apps	Goals	Apps	Goals	Apps	Goals	Apps	Goals
Nagoya Grampus	2011	1	0	1	1	0	0	2	0	4	1
Nagoya Grampus	2012	8	0	0	0	2	0	2	0	12	0
Nagoya Grampus	2013	16	2	1	0	4	0	-		21	2
Oita Trinita	2014	9	0	0	0	-		-		9	0
Nagoya Grampus	2015	18	1	1	0	4	0	-		23	1
V-Varen Nagasaki	2016	9	0	2	0	–		–		11	0
Career total		61	3	5	1	10	0	4	0	80	4
