= Danilson Córdoba =

Colombian footballer (born 1986)

Personal information
- Full name: Luis Danilson Córdoba Rodríguez
- Date of birth: September 6, 1986 (age 40)
- Place of birth: Quibdó, Colombia
- Height: 1.85 m (6 ft 1 in)
- Position: Midfielder

Senior career*
Years	Team	Apps	(Gls)
2004–2008	Independiente Medellín	131	(7)
2009	Consadole Sapporo	41	(6)
2010–2015	Nagoya Grampus	140	(8)
2016–2017	Avispa Fukuoka	20	(0)
2017	Independiente Medellín	7	(0)
2018	Jaguares de Córdoba	9	(0)

International career^{‡}
2007–2008	Colombia	3	(0)
- * Club domestic league appearances and goals as of 4 August 2017 ‡ National team caps and goals as of 13 December 2009

Luis Danilson Córdoba Rodríguez is a retired Colombian footballer.

== Club career ==
Cordoba began his career with Independiente Medellín in 2004 and was part of the squad that won the 2004 Apertura title. In 2008, the club was runner-up after losing the finals to América de Cali. Shortly after that he left to J2 League club Consadole Sapporo.

On 5 January 2010 Nagoya Grampus signed the Colombian midfielder on loan from Consadole Sapporo until the remainder of the current season. He was part of the squad that won the club's first league title in the 2010 season, contributing with 4 goals, and was named in the Best XI. In November 2015, he was released after six seasons in Nagoya.

In June 2017, Cordoba rejoined El Poderoso under manager Juan José Peláez, almost a decade after leaving the club.

== International career ==
Cordoba played 3 matches for the Colombia national team between 2007 and 2008.

== Career statistics ==
=== Club ===
Updated to 23 February 2017.

Club	Season	League		Cup^{1}		League Cup^{2}		Continental^{3}		Total	
Club	Season	Apps	Goals	Apps	Goals	Apps	Goals	Apps	Goals	Apps	Goals
Independiente Medellín	2004	16	0	-		-		-		16	0
Independiente Medellín	2005	16	0	-		-		-		16	0
Independiente Medellín	2006	29	2	-		-		-		29	2
Independiente Medellín	2007	31	1	-		-		-		31	1
Independiente Medellín	2008	39	4			-		-		39	4
Independiente Medellín	Total	131	7			-		-		131	7
Consadole Sapporo	2009	41	6	2	0	-		-		43	6
Consadole Sapporo	Total	41	6	2	0	-		-		43	6
Nagoya Grampus	2010	26	4	1	0	5	0	-		32	4
Nagoya Grampus	2011	23	0	2	0	0	0	1	0	26	0
Nagoya Grampus	2012	26	3	3	0	2	0	6	0	35	3
Nagoya Grampus	2013	26	0	1	0	6	0	-		33	0
Nagoya Grampus	2014	27	1	3	0	4	0	-		34	1
Nagoya Grampus	2015	12	0	1	0	3	0	-		16	0
Nagoya Grampus	Total	140	8	11	0	20	0	7	0	165	8
Avispa Fukuoka	2016	17	0	0	0	3	0	-		20	0
Avispa Fukuoka	Total	17	0	0	0	3	0	-		20	0
Career Total		329	21	13	0	23	0	7	0	372	21

^{1}Includes Emperor's Cup.

^{2}Includes J. League Cup.

^{3}Includes AFC Champions League.

=== International ===
Colombia national team
Year	Apps	Goals
2007	2	0
2008	1	0
Total	3	0

Statistics accurate as of match played 6 February 2008

== Honours ==
=== Club ===
==== Independiente Medellin ====
- Categoría Primera A: 2004

Nagoya Grampus
- J. League Division 1: 2010

- Japanese Super Cup: 2011

=== Individual ===
- J. League Best Eleven: 2010
