= Ryunosuke Noda =

Japanese footballer

Ryunosuke Noda 野田 隆之介
Personal information
- Full name: Ryunosuke Noda
- Date of birth: September 28, 1988 (age 38)
- Place of birth: Fukuoka, Japan
- Height: 1.83 m (6 ft 0 in)
- Position: Forward

Youth career
- 1995–2000: Shikata Elementary School
- 2001–2003: Kanatake Junior High School
- 2004–2006: Fukuoka Maizuru High School

College career
Years	Team	Apps	(Gls)
2007–2010	Japan University of Economics		

Senior career*
Years	Team	Apps	(Gls)
2010–2013	Sagan Tosu	70	(11)
2014–2016	Nagoya Grampus	19	(2)
2017–2019	Shonan Bellmare	59	(8)
2020–2021	Kyoto Sanga	40	(4)
2022–2024	FC Ryukyu	79	(17)
Total		267	(42)
Medal record
Shonan Bellmare
Winner	J.League Cup	2018
- * Club domestic league appearances and goals

Ryunosuke Noda (野田 隆之介, Noda Ryūnosuke; born September 28, 1988) is a Japanese former football player.

== Career statistics ==
Updated to 21 December 2019.

Club	Season	League			Cup		League Cup		Total	
Club	Season	Division	Apps	Goals	Apps	Goals	Apps	Goals	Apps	Goals
Sagan Tosu	2010	J2 League	7	0	1	1	-		8	1
Sagan Tosu	2011	J2 League	26	3	1	0	-		27	3
Sagan Tosu	2012	J1 League	17	4	1	2	5	1	23	6
Sagan Tosu	2013	J1 League	20	4	0	0	5	1	25	5
Nagoya Grampus	2014	J1 League	0	0	0	0	0	0	0	0
Nagoya Grampus	2015	J1 League	4	1	0	0	2	2	6	3
Nagoya Grampus	2016	J1 League	15	1	1	0	2	1	18	2
Shonan Bellmare	2017	J2 League	20	2	1	0	-		21	2
Shonan Bellmare	2018	J1 League	16	2	0	0	7	2	23	4
Shonan Bellmare	2019	J1 League	23	4	1	0	1	1	25	5
Career total			148	21	6	3	22	8	176	32
