= Yuki Honda =

Japanese footballer (born 1991)

Yuki Honda 本多 勇喜
Personal information
- Full name: Yuki Honda
- Date of birth: 2 January 1991 (age 35)
- Place of birth: Ichinomiya, Aichi, Japan
- Height: 1.73 m (5 ft 8 in)
- Position: Defender

Team information
- Current team: Shimizu S-Pulse
- Number: 15

Youth career
- –2005: Gifu Vamos
- 2006–2008: Nagoya Grampus

College career
Years	Team	Apps	(Gls)
2009–2012	Hannan University		

Senior career*
Years	Team	Apps	(Gls)
2013–2015	Nagoya Grampus	67	(1)
2016–2022	Kyoto Sanga	213	(4)
2023–2025	Vissel Kobe	83	(1)
2026–	Shimizu S-Pulse	16	(0)
- * Club domestic league appearances and goals as of 10 August 2026

Yuki Honda (本多 勇喜, Honda Yūki; born 2 January 1991) is a Japanese footballer who plays as a defender for J1 League club Shimizu S-Pulse.

== Career ==
Honda made his official debut for Nagoya Grampus in the J1 League on 16 March 2013 against Ventforet Kofu in which he scored the winning goal for Grampus 4 minutes into stoppage time in the 2nd half to win the game for Grampus 1–0.

In December 2015, Honda signed for Kyoto Sanga.

== Career statistics ==
=== Club ===
As of 23 April 2026.

Appearances and goals by club, season and competition
Club	Season	League			National cup (Note: Includes Emperors Cup)		League cup (Note: Includes J.League Cup)		Continental		Other		Total	
Club	Season	Division	Apps	Goals	Apps	Goals	Apps	Goals	Apps	Goals	Apps	Goals	Apps	Goals
Hannan University	2011	–			1	0	–		–		–		1	0
Nagoya Grampus	2013	J.League Division 1	5	1	0	0	2	0	–		–		7	1
Nagoya Grampus	2014	J.League Division 1	33	0	3	0	5	0	–		–		41	0
Nagoya Grampus	2015	J1 League	29	0	0	0	8	0	–		–		37	0
Nagoya Grampus	Total		67	1	3	0	15	0	0	0	0	0	85	1
Kyoto Sanga	2016	J2 League	39	1	1	0	0	0	–		1 (Note: Appearance in J1/J2 play-offs)	0	41	1
Kyoto Sanga	2017	J2 League	38	2	1	0	0	0	–		0	0	39	2
Kyoto Sanga	2018	J2 League	36	1	0	0	0	0	–		0	0	36	1
Kyoto Sanga	2019	J2 League	37	0	0	0	0	0	–		0	0	37	0
Kyoto Sanga	2020	J2 League	28	0	0	0	0	0	–		0	0	28	0
Kyoto Sanga	2021	J2 League	20	0	2	0	0	0	–		0	0	22	0
Kyoto Sanga	2022	J1 League	15	0	3	0	6	0	–		1	0	25	0
Kyoto Sanga	Total		213	4	7	0	6	0	0	0	2	0	228	4
Vissel Kobe	2023	J1 League	32	0	4	0	1	0	0	0	0	0	37	0
Vissel Kobe	2024	J1 League	25	1	5	0	2	0	5 (Note: Appearances in AFC Champions League Elite)	0	0	0	37	1
Vissel Kobe	2025	J1 League	26	0	5	0	0	0	6	0	0	0	37	0
Vissel Kobe	Total		83	1	14	0	3	0	11	0	0	0	111	1
Shimizu S-Pulse	2026	J1 (100)	7	0	–		–		–		–		7	0
Career total			370	6	25	0	24	0	11	0	2	0	432	6

== Honours ==
Vissel Kobe

- J1 League: 2023, 2024
- Emperor's Cup: 2024
