= Yusuke Muta =

Japanese footballer

Yusuke Muta 牟田 雄祐
Personal information
- Full name: Yusuke Muta
- Date of birth: 20 September 1990 (age 36)
- Place of birth: Fukuoka, Japan
- Height: 1.87 m (6 ft 2 in)
- Position: Centre back

Youth career
- –2002: Chiyo SC
- 2003–2005: Hakata Junior High School
- 2006–2008: Chikuyo Gakuen High School

College career
Years	Team	Apps	(Gls)
2009–2012	Fukuoka University		

Senior career*
Years	Team	Apps	(Gls)
2013–2015	Nagoya Grampus	56	(2)
2016–2019	Kyoto Sanga	28	(0)
2017	→ FC Imabari (loan)	10	(0)
2020–2022	Iwate Grulla Morioka	86	(12)
2023	FC Ryukyu	22	(0)
2023–2024	Boeung Ket	29	(6)
- * Club domestic league appearances and goals as of 1 January 2024

Yusuke Muta (牟田 雄祐, Muta Yusuke; born 20 September 1990) is a Japanese professional footballer who recently played as a defender for Boeung Ket in the Cambodian Premier League.

== Career ==
Born in Fukuoka, Muta signed with Nagoya Grampus of the J. League Division 1 from Fukuoka University in January 2013. He made his debut for the club on 2 March 2013 against Júbilo Iwata; he started the game, playing 66 minutes before being substituted for Shohei Abe as Nagoya went on to draw the match 1–1.

On 23 December 2015, Muta signed to Kyoto Sanga from 2016 season.

On 7 August 2017, Muta was loaned out to JFL club, FC Imabari for during 2017 season. In Imabari, he participated in 10 league matches and returned to Kyoto in November at same year when the JFL season ended.

Muta not renewal contract after expiration with club for four years at Kyoto in 2019. After leave from Kyoto, On 21 January 2020, Muta signed transfer to J3 club, Iwate Grulla Morioka ahead of 2020 season. He leave from the club in 2022 after three years at Morioka, he was brought his club promotion to J2 for the first time in history from 2022 season, but after a season his club relegation to J3 from 2023.

On 27 December 2022, Muta officially transfer to J3 relegated club, FC Ryukyu for upcoming 2023 season.

== Career statistics ==
Updated to the end of 2022 season.

Club	Season	League		J. League Cup		Emperor's Cup		AFC		Total	
Club	Season	Apps	Goals	Apps	Goals	Apps	Goals	Apps	Goals	Apps	Goals
Nagoya Grampus	2013	8	0	0	0	0	0	-		8	0
Nagoya Grampus	2014	24	1	4	0	5	0	-		33	1
Nagoya Grampus	2015	24	1	1	0	4	0	-		29	1
Kyoto Sanga	2016	0	0	0	0	-		-		0	0
Kyoto Sanga	2017	6	0	0	0	-		-		6	0
FC Imabari	2017	10	0	0	0	-		-		10	0
Kyoto Sanga	2018	18	0	1	0	-		-		19	0
Kyoto Sanga	2019	4	0	1	0	-		-		5	0
Iwate Grulla Morioka	2020	27	5	0	0	-		-		27	5
Iwate Grulla Morioka	2021	27	4	3	0	-		-		30	4
Iwate Grulla Morioka	2022	32	3	1	0	-		-		33	3
FC Ryukyu	2023	0	0	0	0	-		-		0	0
Career total		180	14	11	0	9	0	-		200	14
