= Kazuki Sato (footballer, born 1993) =

Japanese footballer

Kazuki Sato 佐藤和樹
Personal information
- Full name: Kazuki Sato
- Date of birth: 18 May 1993 (age 33)
- Place of birth: Nagoya, Japan
- Height: 1.75 m (5 ft 9 in)
- Position: Defender

Youth career
- 2005–2011: Nagoya Grampus

Senior career*
Years	Team	Apps	(Gls)
2012–2015	Nagoya Grampus	4	(0)
2014–2015	→ J. League U-22 (loan)	10	(0)
2016–2017	Mito HollyHock	12	(0)
2017	→ Kataller Toyama (loan)	8	(1)
2018	Kataller Toyama	6	(0)
2019–2022	Vanraure Hachinohe	72	(5)
2021	→ Fukushima United (loan)	3	(0)
- * Club domestic league appearances and goals

Kazuki Sato (佐藤 和樹, Satō Kazuki; born 18 May 1993) is a Japanese football player.

== Club career ==
He was released by Nagoya Grampus after five seasons with the club.

== Career statistics ==
Updated to 23 February 2018.

Appearances and goals by club, season and competition
Club	Season	League			Emperor's Cup		J.League Cup		Total	
Club	Season	Division	Apps	Goals	Apps	Goals	Apps	Goals	Apps	Goals
Nagoya Grampus	2012	J1 League	0	0	1	0	0	0	1	0
Nagoya Grampus	2013	J1 League	0	0	0	0	0	0	0	0
Nagoya Grampus	2014	J1 League	3	0	3	2	2	0	8	2
Nagoya Grampus	2015	J1 League	1	0	0	0	2	0	3	0
Mito HollyHock	2016	J2 League	11	0	0	0	–		11	0
Mito HollyHock	2017	J2 League	0	0	0	0	–		0	0
Kataller Toyama	2017	J3 League	8	1	0	0	–		8	1
Career total			23	1	4	2	4	0	31	3
