= Ryota Tanabe =

Japanese footballer

Ryota Tanabe 田鍋 陵太
Personal information
- Full name: Ryota Tanabe
- Date of birth: 10 April 1993 (age 33)
- Place of birth: Itabashi, Tokyo, Japan
- Height: 1.78 m (5 ft 10 in)
- Position: Midfielder

Team information
- Current team: Tokyo United FC
- Number: 15

Youth career
- 2009–2011: Tokyo Metropolitan Government; Board of Education

Senior career*
Years	Team	Apps	(Gls)
2012–2017	Nagoya Grampus	26	(2)
2014–2015	→ J.League U-22 Selection (loan)	2	(0)
2017	→ Roasso Kumamoto (loan)	0	(0)
2018	Tokyo United FC		
- * Club domestic league appearances and goals as of 31 January 2018

Ryota Tanabe (田鍋 陵太, born 10 April 1993) is a Japanese football player for Tokyo United FC.

== Career statistics ==
=== Club ===
Updated to 31 January 2018.

Club	Season	League		Emperor's Cup		J. League Cup		AFC		Total	
Club	Season	Apps	Goals	Apps	Goals	Apps	Goals	Apps	Goals	Apps	Goals
Nagoya Grampus	2012	2	0	1	0	0	0	1	0	4	0
Nagoya Grampus	2013	4	0	0	0	4	0	-		8	0
Nagoya Grampus	2014	13	2	1	1	4	0	-		18	3
Nagoya Grampus	2015	5	0	1	0	3	0	-		9	0
Nagoya Grampus	2016	0	0	0	0	0	0	-		0	0
Nagoya Grampus	2017	2	0	1	0	–		–		3	0
Roasso Kumamoto	2017	0	0	0	0	–		–		0	0
Total		26	2	4	1	11	0	1	0	42	3
