= Kengo Kawamata =

Japanese footballer (born 1989)

Kengo Kawamata 川又 堅碁
Personal information
- Full name: Kengo Kawamata
- Date of birth: 14 October 1989 (age 37)
- Place of birth: Saijō, Ehime, Japan
- Height: 1.84 m (6 ft 0 in)
- Position: Striker

Team information
- Current team: Azul Claro Numazu
- Number: 20

Youth career
- 2005–2007: Komatsu High School

Senior career*
Years	Team	Apps	(Gls)
2006	Ehime FC	2	(0)
2008–2014	Albirex Niigata	75	(26)
2010	→ Catanduvense (loan)		
2012	→ Fagiano Okayama (loan)	38	(18)
2014–2016	Nagoya Grampus	65	(18)
2017–2019	Júbilo Iwata	73	(26)
2020–2022	JEF United Chiba	29	(6)
2023–	Azul Claro Numazu	63	(10)

International career
2015–2018	Japan	9	(1)
- * Club domestic league appearances and goals as of 5 January 2026

Kengo Kawamata (川又 堅碁, Kawamata Kengo; born 14 October 1989) is a Japanese footballer who plays for Azul Claro Numazu.

== Career ==
Kawamata joined Ehime FC as an apprentice professional in 2006, while studying at Komatsu High school. He made his J2 League debut against Mito HollyHock in the 41st round. In the 42nd round, he was able to provide an assist for Toshiya Tanaka.

After graduating from high school, he joined Albirex Niigata. In the 2010 season, he moved on a half-year loan to Brazilian club Catanduvense. He made 23 appearances during the 2011 season, scoring his first goal against Nagoya Grampus in the J.League Cup quarterfinals.

In the 2012 season, Kawamata was loaned out to Fagiano Okayama on a season-long loan deal. At the end of the season, after 18 goals in 38 appearances, he returned to Niigata. He made a huge comeback to Albirex scoring 23 goals in 34 matches.

After a great season, Kawamata decided to transfer to Nagoya Grampus at half-season of 2014.

On 29 November 2016, Kawamata moved to Júbilo Iwata. He then moved to JEF United Chiba on 24 June 2020.

== Club statistics ==
Updated to 19 February 2019.

Club performance			League		Emperor's Cup		J. League Cup		Total	
Season	Club	League	Apps	Goals	Apps	Goals	Apps	Goals	Apps	Goals
2006	Ehime FC	J2 League	2	0	0	0	–		2	0
2008	Albirex Niigata	J1 League	1	0	1	0	1	0	3	0
2009	Albirex Niigata	J1 League	1	0	0	0	1	0	2	0
2010	Albirex Niigata	J1 League	4	0	2	0	0	0	6	0
2011	Albirex Niigata	J1 League	23	0	2	2	2	1	27	3
2012	Fagiano Okayama	J2 League	38	18	2	0	–		40	18
2013	Albirex Niigata	J1 League	32	23	2	0	6	1	40	24
2014	Albirex Niigata	J1 League	14	3	1	0	5	0	20	3
2014	Nagoya Grampus	J1 League	15	4	0	0	–		15	4
2015	Nagoya Grampus	J1 League	33	9	0	0	6	2	40	11
2016	Nagoya Grampus	J1 League	17	5	1	0	6	1	24	6
2017	Júbilo Iwata	J1 League	34	14	0	0	2	2	36	16
2018	Júbilo Iwata	J1 League	31	11	2	3	2	1	35	15
Career total			245	86	29	8	16	5	290	100

== National team statistics ==
Japan national team
Year	Apps	Goals
2015	5	1
2016	0	0
2017	3	0
2018	1	0
Total	9	1

=== National team goals ===
Score and Result lists Japan's goal tally first

No.	Date	Venue	Opponent	Score	Result	Competition	Ref.
1.	31 March 2015	Ajinomoto Stadium, Chōfu, Japan	Uzbekistan	5–1	5–1	Friendly	

== Private life ==
In April 22, 2024, Kawamata announced through his official website that he has married actress and architect Michiko Tanaka.
