= Ryota Isomura =

Japanese footballer

Ryota Isomura 磯村 亮太
Personal information
- Full name: Ryota Isomura
- Date of birth: 16 March 1991 (age 35)
- Place of birth: Seto, Aichi, Japan
- Height: 1.81 m (5 ft 11 1/2 in)
- Position: Midfielder

Youth career
- 2003–2008: Nagoya Grampus Youth

Senior career*
Years	Team	Apps	(Gls)
2009–2017	Nagoya Grampus	97	(6)
2017–2018	Albirex Niigata	35	(1)
2018–2021	V-Varen Nagasaki	48	(1)
2022	Tochigi SC	9	(0)
Total		189	(8)
Medal record
Nagoya Grampus
Winner	J1 League	2010
Runner-up	J1 League	2011
Runner-up	Emperor's Cup	2009
- * Club domestic league appearances and goals as of 04:08, 19 January 2024

Ryota Isomura (磯村 亮太, Isomura Ryōta; born 16 March 1991) is a Japanese former football player. He last played for Tochigi SC.

== Early life ==
Ryota was born in Seto. He played for Nagoya Grampus.

== Career ==
Ryota made his league debut for Nagoya against Kawasaki Frontale on 29 April 2011. He scored his first goal for the club against Omiya Ardija on 18 June 2011.

Ryota made his debut for Albirex against FC Tokyo on 30 July 2017. He scored his first goal for the club against Renofa Yamaguchi on 28 April 2018, scoring in the 16th minute.

Ryota made his debut for V-Varen against Urawa Red Diamonds on 5 August 2018. He scored his first goal for the club against Zweigen Kanazawa, a penalty in the 90th+1st minute on 20 December 2012.

Ryota made his debut for Tochigi against Omiya Ardija on 13 March 2022.

== Career statistics ==
=== Club ===
Updated to 28 February 2019.

Club	Season	League		Cup^{1}		League Cup^{2}		Continental^{3}		Total	
Club	Season	Apps	Goals	Apps	Goals	Apps	Goals	Apps	Goals	Apps	Goals
Nagoya Grampus	2009	0	0	0	0	0	0	0	0	0	0
Nagoya Grampus	2010	0	0	1	0	0	0	-		1	0
Nagoya Grampus	2011	20	3	2	0	2	0	4	0	28	3
Nagoya Grampus	2012	5	0	2	0	0	0	1	0	8	0
Nagoya Grampus	2013	6	0	0	0	3	0	-		9	0
Nagoya Grampus	2014	17	1	3	0	0	0	-		20	1
Nagoya Grampus	2015	24	2	0	0	7	0	-		31	2
Nagoya Grampus	2016	16	0	0	0	3	0	-		19	0
Nagoya Grampus	2017	9	0	1	0	-		-		10	0
Albirex Niigata	2017	16	0	-		-		-		16	0
Albirex Niigata	2018	19	1	0	0	1	0	-		20	1
V-Varen Nagasaki	2018	12	0	0	0	0	0	-		12	0
Total		144	7	9	0	16	0	5	0	174	7

^{1}Includes Emperor's Cup.

^{2}Includes J. League Cup.

^{3}Includes AFC Champions League.

== Honours ==
Nagoya Grampus

- J1 League: 2010, 2011 (runners-up)
- Japanese Super Cup: 2011
