= Riki Matsuda =

Japanese - Indonesian footballer

Riki Matsuda 松田 力
Personal information
- Full name: Riki Matsuda
- Date of birth: 24 July 1991 (age 35)
- Place of birth: Osaka, Japan
- Height: 1.75 m (5 ft 9 in)
- Position: Forward

Team information
- Current team: Kataller Toyama
- Number: 10

Youth career
- Osaka Central FC
- 2006–2008: Rissho University Shonan High School

College career
Years	Team	Apps	(Gls)
2009–2012	Biwako Seikei Sport College		

Senior career*
Years	Team	Apps	(Gls)
2013	Oita Trinita	9	(4)
2014–2016	Nagoya Grampus	56	(3)
2015	→ JEF United Chiba (loan)	15	(4)
2017–2019	Avispa Fukuoka	105	(18)
2020	Ventforet Kofu	36	(4)
2021	Cerezo Osaka	20	(1)
2022–2024	Ehime FC	95	(24)
2025–	Kataller Toyama	35	(2)
- * Club domestic league appearances and goals as of 16 August 2026

Riki Matsuda (松田 力, Matsuda Riki; born July 24, 1991) is a Japanese professional footballer who plays as a forward for J2 League club Kataller Toyama.

== Career ==
=== Oita Trinita ===
Matsuda made his official debut for Oita Trinita in the J. League Division 1 on 22 May 2013 against Sagan Tosu in Best Amenity Stadium in Tosu, Japan. He played the full match in where his team lost 2-3. He scored his first league goal against Yokohama F. Marinos on 6 July 2013, scoring in the 31st minute.

=== Nagoya Grampus ===
On 1 November 2013, Matsuda was announced at Nagoya Grampus for the 2014 season. He made his league debut against Shimizu S-Pulse on 1 March 2014. Matsuda scored his first league goal against Vissel Kobe on 23 March 2014, scoring in the 87th minute. On 12 January 2016, it was announced that he would return to Nagoya Grampus from his loan spell.

=== Loan to JEF United Chiba ===
Matsuda made his league debut against Cerezo Osaka on 8 August 2015. He scored his first league goal against V-Varen Nagasaki on 15 August 2015, scoring in the 32nd minute.

=== Avispa Fukuoka ===
On 20 December 2016, Matsuda was announced at Avispa Fukuoka. He made his league debut against Oita Trinita on 26 February 2017. Matsuda scored his first league goals against Zweigen Kanazawa on 21 May 2017, scoring in the 73rd and 87th minute.

=== Ventforet Kofu ===
Matsuda made his league debut against Machida Zelvia on 23 February 2020. He scored his first league goal against Mito HollyHock on 29 July 2020, scoring in the 28th minute.

=== Cerezo Osaka ===
On 5 January 2021, Matsuda was announced at Cerezo Osaka. He made his league debut against Kawasaki Frontale on 3 March 2021. Matsuda scored his first league goal against Hokkaido Consadole Sapporo on 8 September 2021, scoring in the 51st minute. On 6 January 2022, it was announced that his contract would not be renewed for the 2022 season.

=== Ehime FC ===
On 20 January 2022, Riki Matsuda joined J3 relegated club Ehime FC for the upcoming 2022 season. He made his league debut against Kataller Toyama on 13 March 2022. Matsuda scored his first league goal against Matsumoto Yamaga on 18 June 2022, scoring in the 27th minute.

In 2023, Matsuda's jersey was changed to number 10. He scored double-digit goals for the first time in his career. On 11 November 2023, Riki Matsuda scored a goal in 49th minute and won 1-0 against rivals FC Imabari. Ehime became J3 League champions in 2023 and gained promotion to the J2 League from 2024.

Matsuda won the 2023 J3 League Player of the Year award.

=== Kataller Toyama ===
On 25 December 2024, Matsuda was announce official transfer to J2 promoted club, Kataller Toyama from 2025 season.

== Personal life ==
Matsuda was born to Indonesian father and Japanese mother. His twin brother, Riku, is also a soccer player who currently plays for Vissel Kobe of the J1 League.

== Career statistics ==
=== Club ===
As of the start for 2025 season.

Appearances and goals by club, season and competition
Club	Season	League			Emperor's Cup		J. League Cup		Total	
Club	Season	Division	Apps	Goals	Apps	Goals	Apps	Goals	Apps	Goals
Oita Trinita	2013	J. League Div. 1	9	4	–		1	0	10	4
Nagoya Grampus	2014	J. League Div. 1	31	1	4	3	6	1	41	5
Nagoya Grampus	2015	J. League Div. 1	11	1	–		4	1	15	2
JEF United Chiba	2015	J2 League	15	4	2	1	–		17	5
Nagoya Grampus	2016	J1 League	14	1	0	0	0	0	14	1
Avispa Fukuoka	2017	J2 League	31	4	2	0	–		33	4
Avispa Fukuoka	2018	J2 League	37	6	1	0	–		38	6
Avispa Fukuoka	2019	J2 League	36	8	1	0	–		37	8
Ventforet Kofu	2020	J2 League	36	4	–				36	4
Cerezo Osaka	2021	J1 League	20	1	1	0	4	1	25	2
Ehime FC	2022	J3 League	29	8	–				29	8
Ehime FC	2023	J3 League	34	13	–				34	13
Ehime FC	2024	J2 League	32	3	–				32	3
Kataller Toyama	2025	J2 League	33	2	0	0	0	0	33	2
Career total			368	60	11	4	15	3	394	67

== Honours ==
Kansai Student Selection

- Denso Cup Soccer: 2012

Ehime FC

- J3 League: 2023

Individual

- Kansai Student Soccer League Division 1 Rookie of the Year: 2010
- Kansai Student Soccer League Division 1 Outstanding Player Award : 2012, 2013
- Top scorer in the Kansai Student Soccer League Division 1: 2012
- Denso Cup Challenge Soccer Best XI: 2012
- J3 League Best XI: 2023
- J3 League MVP Award: 2023
