= List of Japanese football transfers summer 2017 =

This is a list of Japanese football transfers in the summer transfer window 2017 by club.

== J1 League ==
=== Urawa Red Diamonds ===
In: Note: Flags indicate national team as defined under FIFA eligibility rules; some limited exceptions apply. Players may hold more than one non-FIFA nationality.

No.	Pos.	Nation	Player
2	DF	BRA	Maurício Antônio (from (Portugal) C.S. Marítimo)

Out: Note: Flags indicate national team as defined under FIFA eligibility rules; some limited exceptions apply. Players may hold more than one non-FIFA nationality.

No.	Pos.	Nation	Player
24	MF	JPN	Takahiro Sekine (to (Germany) FC Ingolstadt 04)
26	MF	JPN	Ryotaro Ito (loan to Mito HollyHock)

=== Kawasaki Frontale ===
In: Note: Flags indicate national team as defined under FIFA eligibility rules; some limited exceptions apply. Players may hold more than one non-FIFA nationality.

No.	Pos.	Nation	Player
33	MF	JPN	Yasuto Wakizaka (from Hannan University)
34	MF	JPN	Kaoru Mitoma (from Tsukuba University)
35	MF	JPN	Hidemasa Morita (from Ryutsu Keizai University)

Out: Note: Flags indicate national team as defined under FIFA eligibility rules; some limited exceptions apply. Players may hold more than one non-FIFA nationality.

No.	Pos.	Nation	Player

=== Kashima Antlers ===
In: Note: Flags indicate national team as defined under FIFA eligibility rules; some limited exceptions apply. Players may hold more than one non-FIFA nationality.

No.	Pos.	Nation	Player

Out: Note: Flags indicate national team as defined under FIFA eligibility rules; some limited exceptions apply. Players may hold more than one non-FIFA nationality.

No.	Pos.	Nation	Player
31	GK	JPN	Yuto Koizumi (loan to Mito HollyHock)

=== Gamba Osaka ===
In: Note: Flags indicate national team as defined under FIFA eligibility rules; some limited exceptions apply. Players may hold more than one non-FIFA nationality.

No.	Pos.	Nation	Player
11	FW	KOR	Hwang Ui-jo (from (South Korea) Seongnam FC)
55	DF	JPN	Takaharu Nishino (loan return from JEF United Chiba)

Out: Note: Flags indicate national team as defined under FIFA eligibility rules; some limited exceptions apply. Players may hold more than one non-FIFA nationality.

No.	Pos.	Nation	Player
5	DF	JPN	Daiki Niwa (to Sanfrecce Hiroshima)
16	GK	JPN	Ken Tajiri (loan to Zweigen Kanazawa)
38	MF	JPN	Ritsu Doan (loan to (Netherlands) FC Groningen)
55	FW	BRA	Patric (loan return to (Brazil) Salgueiro)

=== Omiya Ardija ===
In: Note: Flags indicate national team as defined under FIFA eligibility rules; some limited exceptions apply. Players may hold more than one non-FIFA nationality.

No.	Pos.	Nation	Player
33	FW	BRA	Marcelo Toscano (from (South Korea) Jeju United)
35	DF	KOR	Kim Dong-su (from (Germany) Hamburger SV II)
37	MF	BRA	Cauê Cecilio (from (Portugal) Moreirense)
—	DF	JPN	Kento Kawata (from Thespakusatsu Gunma, previously on loan)

Out: Note: Flags indicate national team as defined under FIFA eligibility rules; some limited exceptions apply. Players may hold more than one non-FIFA nationality.

No.	Pos.	Nation	Player
5	DF	JPN	Keigo Numata (to Zweigen Kanazawa)
8	FW	SRB	Dragan Mrđa (to Shonan Bellmare)
9	FW	SLO	Nejc Pecnik (to Tochigi SC)
30	FW	JPN	Takumu Fujinuma (loan to Tochigi SC)
—	DF	JPN	Kento Kawata (loan to Tochigi SC)

=== Sanfrecce Hiroshima ===
In: Note: Flags indicate national team as defined under FIFA eligibility rules; some limited exceptions apply. Players may hold more than one non-FIFA nationality.

No.	Pos.	Nation	Player
20	FW	AUS	Nathan Burns (from FC Tokyo)
39	FW	BRA	Patric (loan from (Brazil) Salgueiro)
40	DF	JPN	Daiki Niwa (from Gamba Osaka)
43	DF	JPN	Kenta Mukuhara (on loan from Cerezo Osaka)
—	MF	JPN	Gakuto Notsuda (from Shimizu S-Pulse, previously on loan)

Out: Note: Flags indicate national team as defined under FIFA eligibility rules; some limited exceptions apply. Players may hold more than one non-FIFA nationality.

No.	Pos.	Nation	Player
16	MF	JPN	Kohei Shimizu (on loan to Shimizu S-Pulse)
24	MF	JPN	Yoichi Naganuma (on loan to Montedio Yamagata)
26	DF	JPN	Yasumasa Kawasaki (on loan to Yokohama FC)
33	DF	JPN	Tsukasa Shiotani (to (United Arab Emirates) Al Ain FC)
—	MF	JPN	Gakuto Notsuda (on loan to Vegalta Sendai)

=== Vissel Kobe ===
In: Note: Flags indicate national team as defined under FIFA eligibility rules; some limited exceptions apply. Players may hold more than one non-FIFA nationality.

No.	Pos.	Nation	Player
9	FW	JPN	Mike Havenaar (from (Netherlands) ADO Den Haag)
10	FW	GER	Lukas Podolski (from (Turkey) Galatasaray S.K.)

Out: Note: Flags indicate national team as defined under FIFA eligibility rules; some limited exceptions apply. Players may hold more than one non-FIFA nationality.

No.	Pos.	Nation	Player

=== Kashiwa Reysol ===
In: Note: Flags indicate national team as defined under FIFA eligibility rules; some limited exceptions apply. Players may hold more than one non-FIFA nationality.

No.	Pos.	Nation	Player
15	MF	KOR	Kim Bo-kyung (from (South Korea) Jeonbuk Hyundai Motors)

Out: Note: Flags indicate national team as defined under FIFA eligibility rules; some limited exceptions apply. Players may hold more than one non-FIFA nationality.

No.	Pos.	Nation	Player
25	MF	JPN	Kaito Anzai (loan to Montedio Yamagata)

=== Yokohama F. Marinos ===
In: Note: Flags indicate national team as defined under FIFA eligibility rules; some limited exceptions apply. Players may hold more than one non-FIFA nationality.

No.	Pos.	Nation	Player
37	MF	RUS	Ippei Shinozuka (from Spartak-2 Moscow)

Out: Note: Flags indicate national team as defined under FIFA eligibility rules; some limited exceptions apply. Players may hold more than one non-FIFA nationality.

No.	Pos.	Nation	Player
15	DF	JPN	Ikki Arai (on loan to Nagoya Grampus)
19	FW	JPN	Teruhito Nakagawa (loan to Avispa Fukuoka)
26	MF	JPN	Kensei Nakashima (loan to FC Gifu)
28	DF	JPN	Ryo Takano (on loan to Ventforet Kofu)

=== FC Tokyo ===
In: Note: Flags indicate national team as defined under FIFA eligibility rules; some limited exceptions apply. Players may hold more than one non-FIFA nationality.

No.	Pos.	Nation	Player
14	DF	KOR	Jang Hyun-soo (from (China) Guangzhou R&F)
51	MF	BRA	Lipe Veloso (from (Brazil) SE Palmeiras)
52	MF	THA	Jakkit Wechpirom (loan from (Thailand) Bangkok United)

Out: Note: Flags indicate national team as defined under FIFA eligibility rules; some limited exceptions apply. Players may hold more than one non-FIFA nationality.

No.	Pos.	Nation	Player
16	FW	AUS	Nathan Burns (to Sanfrecce Hiroshima)
17	MF	JPN	Hiroki Kawano (to Sagan Tosu)
23	MF	JPN	Shoya Nakajima (on loan to (Portugal) Portimonense)
44	FW	JPN	Takuma Abe (to (South Korea) Ulsan Hyundai)

=== Sagan Tosu ===
In: Note: Flags indicate national team as defined under FIFA eligibility rules; some limited exceptions apply. Players may hold more than one non-FIFA nationality.

No.	Pos.	Nation	Player
7	MF	JPN	Hiroki Kawano (from FC Tokyo)
15	DF	KOR	Jeong Seung-hyun (from (South Korea) Ulsan Hyundai)
25	MF	KOR	An Yong-woo (from (South Korea) Jeonnam Dragons)
30	GK	JPN	Fantini Akira (from (Italy) Cesena)
32	FW	COL	Víctor Ibarbo (from (Italy) Cagliari, previously on loan)

Out: Note: Flags indicate national team as defined under FIFA eligibility rules; some limited exceptions apply. Players may hold more than one non-FIFA nationality.

No.	Pos.	Nation	Player
3	DF	ARG	Franco Sbuttoni (to (Argentina) Atlético Tucumán)
7	MF	JPN	Daichi Kamada (to (Germany) Eintracht Frankfurt)
18	FW	JPN	Takamitsu Tomiyama (on loan to Albirex Niigata)
19	MF	JPN	Tetsuro Ota (on loan to Montedio Yamagata)
20	MF	JPN	Yoshizumi Ogawa (on loan to Albirex Niigata)

=== Vegalta Sendai ===
In: Note: Flags indicate national team as defined under FIFA eligibility rules; some limited exceptions apply. Players may hold more than one non-FIFA nationality.

No.	Pos.	Nation	Player
6	DF	BRA	Vinícius (from (Brazil) EC Vitoria)
16	MF	JPN	Gakuto Notsuda (on loan from Sanfrecce Hiroshima)
29	DF	JPN	Shota Kobayashi (loan from Nagoya Grampus)
—	GK	JPN	Kanta Tanaka (from Biwako Seikei Sport)
—	FW	JPN	Ryo Germain (from Ryutsu Keizai University)

Out: Note: Flags indicate national team as defined under FIFA eligibility rules; some limited exceptions apply. Players may hold more than one non-FIFA nationality.

No.	Pos.	Nation	Player
5	DF	JPN	Naoki Ishikawa (to Consadole Sapporo)
16	MF	BRA	Pablo Diogo (loan return to (Brazil) Atlético Mineiro)
24	MF	JPN	Yuto Sashinami (on loan to Grulla Morioka)
28	MF	JPN	Takumi Sasaki (on loan to Tokushima Vortis)
33	DF	JPN	Masato Tokida (on loan to Oita Trinita)

=== Júbilo Iwata ===
In: Note: Flags indicate national team as defined under FIFA eligibility rules; some limited exceptions apply. Players may hold more than one non-FIFA nationality.

No.	Pos.	Nation	Player
14	MF	JPN	Hiroki Yamada (from (Germany) Karlsruher SC)
37	FW	JPN	Seiya Nakano (from Tsukuba University)

Out: Note: Flags indicate national team as defined under FIFA eligibility rules; some limited exceptions apply. Players may hold more than one non-FIFA nationality.

No.	Pos.	Nation	Player
22	MF	JPN	Daisuke Matsui (to (Poland) Odra Opole)

=== Ventforet Kofu ===
In: Note: Flags indicate national team as defined under FIFA eligibility rules; some limited exceptions apply. Players may hold more than one non-FIFA nationality.

No.	Pos.	Nation	Player
29	FW	BRA	Junior Barros (free agent)
35	DF	JPN	Ryo Takano (on loan from Yokohama F. Marinos)
39	FW	BRA	Lins (from (Brazil) Ponte Preta)

Out: Note: Flags indicate national team as defined under FIFA eligibility rules; some limited exceptions apply. Players may hold more than one non-FIFA nationality.

No.	Pos.	Nation	Player
41	DF	BRA	Yukio Tsuchiya (on loan to Kyoto Sanga)

=== Albirex Niigata ===
In: Note: Flags indicate national team as defined under FIFA eligibility rules; some limited exceptions apply. Players may hold more than one non-FIFA nationality.

No.	Pos.	Nation	Player
6	MF	JPN	Ryota Isomura (from Nagoya Grampus)
11	FW	BRA	Douglas Tanque (from (Mexico) Cafetaleros de Tapachula)
39	FW	JPN	Takamitsu Tomiyama (on loan from Sagan Tosu)
40	MF	JPN	Yoshizumi Ogawa (on loan from Sagan Tosu)
44	DF	JPN	Shun Obu (from Nagoya Grampus)
—	FW	JPN	Arata Watanabe (from Ryutsu Keizai University)

Out: Note: Flags indicate national team as defined under FIFA eligibility rules; some limited exceptions apply. Players may hold more than one non-FIFA nationality.

No.	Pos.	Nation	Player
6	MF	BRA	Jean Patrick (released)
16	FW	JPN	Shu Hiramatsu (on loan to V-Varen Nagasaki)
33	DF	JPN	Ryoma Nishimura (on loan to Montedio Yamagata)
49	FW	JPN	Musashi Suzuki (on loan to Matsumoto Yamaga FC)

=== Hokkaido Consadole Sapporo ===
In: Note: Flags indicate national team as defined under FIFA eligibility rules; some limited exceptions apply. Players may hold more than one non-FIFA nationality.

No.	Pos.	Nation	Player
18	MF	THA	Chanathip Songkrasin (loan from (Thailand) Muangthong United)
32	DF	JPN	Naoki Ishikawa (from Vegalta Sendai)
48	FW	ENG	Jay Bothroyd (free agent)

Out: Note: Flags indicate national team as defined under FIFA eligibility rules; some limited exceptions apply. Players may hold more than one non-FIFA nationality.

No.	Pos.	Nation	Player
21	GK	JPN	Shunta Awaka (loan to Ehime FC)
29	DF	JPN	Yuto Nagasaka (loan to Mito HollyHock)

=== Shimizu S-Pulse ===
In: Note: Flags indicate national team as defined under FIFA eligibility rules; some limited exceptions apply. Players may hold more than one non-FIFA nationality.

No.	Pos.	Nation	Player
2	MF	JPN	Kohei Shimizu (on loan from Sanfrecce Hiroshima)
24	MF	JPN	Chikashi Masuda (from (United Arab Emirates) Al Sharjah SCC)
—	GK	JPN	Yoshiaki Arai (from Ryutsu Keizai University)

Out: Note: Flags indicate national team as defined under FIFA eligibility rules; some limited exceptions apply. Players may hold more than one non-FIFA nationality.

No.	Pos.	Nation	Player
14	MF	JPN	Gakuto Notsuda (to Sanfrecce Hiroshima, previously on loan)
15	DF	KOR	Byeon Jun-byum (loan to Zweigen Kanazawa)

=== Cerezo Osaka ===
In: Note: Flags indicate national team as defined under FIFA eligibility rules; some limited exceptions apply. Players may hold more than one non-FIFA nationality.

No.	Pos.	Nation	Player
47	FW	JPN	Rei Yonezawa (from Renofa Yamaguchi, previously on loan)

Out: Note: Flags indicate national team as defined under FIFA eligibility rules; some limited exceptions apply. Players may hold more than one non-FIFA nationality.

No.	Pos.	Nation	Player
13	MF	JPN	Mitsuru Maruoka (loan to V-Varen Nagasaki)
18	MF	JPN	Shohei Kiyohara (loan to Tokushima Vortis)
33	DF	JPN	Kenta Mukuhara (on loan to Sanfrecce Hiroshima)
39	DF	JPN	Honoya Shoji (loan to Zweigen Kanazawa)

== J2 League ==
=== Nagoya Grampus ===
In: Note: Flags indicate national team as defined under FIFA eligibility rules; some limited exceptions apply. Players may hold more than one non-FIFA nationality.

No.	Pos.	Nation	Player
2	DF	JPN	Ikki Arai (on loan from Yokohama F. Marinos)
37	DF	KOR	Lim Seung-gyeom (Drafted from (South Korea) Korea University)
44	MF	BRA	Gabriel Xavier (loan from (Brazil) Cruzeiro)
46	MF	JPN	Yuki Ogaki (from Kokoku High School)

Out: Note: Flags indicate national team as defined under FIFA eligibility rules; some limited exceptions apply. Players may hold more than one non-FIFA nationality.

No.	Pos.	Nation	Player
4	DF	BRA	Charles (released)
5	DF	JPN	Shun Obu (to Albirex Niigata)
6	DF	JPN	Shota Kobayashi (loan to Vegalta Sendai)
13	MF	JPN	Ryota Isomura (to Albirex Niigata)
14	MF	JPN	Ryota Tanabe (loan to Roasso Kumamoto)
20	MF	JPN	Asahi Yada (loan to JEF United Chiba)
24	DF	JPN	Ryo Takahashi (loan to Shonan Bellmare)
26	DF	JPN	Genki Miyaichi (to Matsumoto Yamaga)

=== Shonan Bellmare ===
In: Note: Flags indicate national team as defined under FIFA eligibility rules; some limited exceptions apply. Players may hold more than one non-FIFA nationality.

No.	Pos.	Nation	Player
10	FW	SRB	Dragan Mrđa (from Omiya Ardija)
40	MF	JPN	Temma Matsuda (from Kanoya College of H&P)
42	DF	JPN	Ryo Takahashi (loan from Nagoya Grampus)

Out: Note: Flags indicate national team as defined under FIFA eligibility rules; some limited exceptions apply. Players may hold more than one non-FIFA nationality.

No.	Pos.	Nation	Player
10	MF	BRA	Chiquinho (loan return to (Brazil) Coimbra EC)
21	GK	JPN	Go Ito (loan to Fukushima United)
26	FW	JPN	Tsuyoshi Miyaichi (loan to MIO Biwako Shiga)

=== Avispa Fukuoka ===
In: Note: Flags indicate national team as defined under FIFA eligibility rules; some limited exceptions apply. Players may hold more than one non-FIFA nationality.

No.	Pos.	Nation	Player
6	DF	KOR	Won Du-jae (Drafted from (South Korea) Hanyang University)
20	DF	BRA	Euller (from (Brazil) Vitória)
24	FW	JPN	Teruhito Nakagawa (loan from Yokohama F. Marinos)

Out: Note: Flags indicate national team as defined under FIFA eligibility rules; some limited exceptions apply. Players may hold more than one non-FIFA nationality.

No.	Pos.	Nation	Player
6	MF	COL	Danilson Córdoba (released)
13	MF	JPN	Hirotaka Tameda (loan to JEF United Chiba)
27	FW	JPN	Takahiro Kunimoto (released)

=== Matsumoto Yamaga ===
In: Note: Flags indicate national team as defined under FIFA eligibility rules; some limited exceptions apply. Players may hold more than one non-FIFA nationality.

No.	Pos.	Nation	Player
34	MF	JPN	Eisuke Takeuchi (promoted from youth ranks)
39	FW	BRA	Davi (free agent)
44	DF	JPN	Genki Miyaichi (from Nagoya Grampus)
50	FW	JPN	Musashi Suzuki (on loan from Albirex Niigata)

Out: Note: Flags indicate national team as defined under FIFA eligibility rules; some limited exceptions apply. Players may hold more than one non-FIFA nationality.

No.	Pos.	Nation	Player
2	DF	KOR	Yeo Sung-hye (to Thespakusatsu Gunma)
25	MF	JPN	Takaaki Shichi (loan to Fukushima United)

=== Kyoto Sanga FC ===
In: Note: Flags indicate national team as defined under FIFA eligibility rules; some limited exceptions apply. Players may hold more than one non-FIFA nationality.

No.	Pos.	Nation	Player
41	DF	JPN	Yukio Tsuchiya (on loan from Ventforet Kofu)
—	MF	JPN	Takuya Shigehiro (from Hannan University)

Out: Note: Flags indicate national team as defined under FIFA eligibility rules; some limited exceptions apply. Players may hold more than one non-FIFA nationality.

No.	Pos.	Nation	Player
17	DF	JPN	Yusuke Muta (on loan to FC Imabari)

=== Fagiano Okayama ===
In: Note: Flags indicate national team as defined under FIFA eligibility rules; some limited exceptions apply. Players may hold more than one non-FIFA nationality.

No.	Pos.	Nation	Player
9	FW	KOR	Kim Jong-min (loan from (South Korea) Suwon Samsung Bluewings)
18	FW	ARG	Nicolás Orsini (loan from Tokushima Vortis)

Out: Note: Flags indicate national team as defined under FIFA eligibility rules; some limited exceptions apply. Players may hold more than one non-FIFA nationality.

No.	Pos.	Nation	Player
4	DF	JPN	Tetsushi Kondo (on loan to Kataller Toyama)

=== Machida Zelvia ===
In: Note: Flags indicate national team as defined under FIFA eligibility rules; some limited exceptions apply. Players may hold more than one non-FIFA nationality.

No.	Pos.	Nation	Player
—	FW	MKD	Dorian Babunski (from (Slovenia) NK Radomlje)

Out: Note: Flags indicate national team as defined under FIFA eligibility rules; some limited exceptions apply. Players may hold more than one non-FIFA nationality.

No.	Pos.	Nation	Player
—	FW	MKD	Dorian Babunski (loan to Kagoshima United FC)

=== Yokohama FC ===
In: Note: Flags indicate national team as defined under FIFA eligibility rules; some limited exceptions apply. Players may hold more than one non-FIFA nationality.

No.	Pos.	Nation	Player
33	DF	JPN	Yasumasa Kawasaki (on loan from Sanfrecce Hiroshima)
40	MF	BRA	Leandro Domingues (from (Brazil) Portuguesa)

Out: Note: Flags indicate national team as defined under FIFA eligibility rules; some limited exceptions apply. Players may hold more than one non-FIFA nationality.

No.	Pos.	Nation	Player

=== Tokushima Vortis ===
In: Note: Flags indicate national team as defined under FIFA eligibility rules; some limited exceptions apply. Players may hold more than one non-FIFA nationality.

No.	Pos.	Nation	Player
30	MF	JPN	Takumi Sasaki (on loan from Vegalta Sendai)
34	MF	JPN	Shohei Kiyohara (loan from Cerezo Osaka)

Out: Note: Flags indicate national team as defined under FIFA eligibility rules; some limited exceptions apply. Players may hold more than one non-FIFA nationality.

No.	Pos.	Nation	Player
7	MF	JPN	Yuji Kimura (on loan to Roasso Kumamoto)
9	FW	SRB	Nikola Ašćerić (Released)
—	FW	ARG	Nicolás Orsini (loan to Fagiano Okayama, previously on loan at (Austria) SV Horn)

=== Ehime FC ===
In: Note: Flags indicate national team as defined under FIFA eligibility rules; some limited exceptions apply. Players may hold more than one non-FIFA nationality.

No.	Pos.	Nation	Player
1	GK	JPN	Shunta Awaka (loan from Consadole Sapporo)

Out: Note: Flags indicate national team as defined under FIFA eligibility rules; some limited exceptions apply. Players may hold more than one non-FIFA nationality.

No.	Pos.	Nation	Player

=== JEF United Chiba ===
In: Note: Flags indicate national team as defined under FIFA eligibility rules; some limited exceptions apply. Players may hold more than one non-FIFA nationality.

No.	Pos.	Nation	Player
13	MF	JPN	Hirotaka Tameda (loan from Avispa Fukuoka)
18	MF	JPN	Asahi Yada (loan from Nagoya Grampus)
40	GK	ARG	Luis Ojeda (from (Mexico) Veracruz)

Out: Note: Flags indicate national team as defined under FIFA eligibility rules; some limited exceptions apply. Players may hold more than one non-FIFA nationality.

No.	Pos.	Nation	Player
32	DF	KOR	Lee Joo-young (on loan to Kamatamare Sanuki)
33	DF	JPN	Takaharu Nishino (loan return to Gamba Osaka)

=== Renofa Yamaguchi ===
In: Note: Flags indicate national team as defined under FIFA eligibility rules; some limited exceptions apply. Players may hold more than one non-FIFA nationality.

No.	Pos.	Nation	Player
24	MF	ARG	Marcelo Vidal (from (Bolivia) Club Blooming)
28	FW	ARG	Leonardo Ramos (from (Argentina) CA Atlanta)
30	DF	ARG	Abel Luciatti (from (Argentina) Club Almagro)
48	GK	JPN	Daiki Kato (from Kyushu Sangyo University)

Out: Note: Flags indicate national team as defined under FIFA eligibility rules; some limited exceptions apply. Players may hold more than one non-FIFA nationality.

No.	Pos.	Nation	Player
7	FW	JPN	Hideya Okamoto (to Nagano Parceiro)
13	FW	JPN	Rei Yonezawa (back to Cerezo Osaka, previously on loan)
18	DF	JPN	Yuki Kagawa (to V-Varen Nagasaki)

=== Mito HollyHock ===
In: Note: Flags indicate national team as defined under FIFA eligibility rules; some limited exceptions apply. Players may hold more than one non-FIFA nationality.

No.	Pos.	Nation	Player
26	MF	JPN	Ryotaro Ito (loan from Urawa Red Diamonds)
37	GK	JPN	Kenta Isaka (from Tokiwa University)
40	GK	JPN	Yuto Koizumi (loan from Kashima Antlers)
44	DF	JPN	Yuto Nagasaka (loan from Consadole Sapporo)
49	FW	JPN	Keita Saito (from Roasso Kumamoto)

Out: Note: Flags indicate national team as defined under FIFA eligibility rules; some limited exceptions apply. Players may hold more than one non-FIFA nationality.

No.	Pos.	Nation	Player
3	DF	JPN	Kazuki Sato (on loan to Kataller Toyama)
5	DF	JPN	Makito Ito (on loan to Fujieda MYFC)
9	FW	JPN	Hiroki Bandai (loan to AC Nagano Parceiro)
13	MF	JPN	Keita Tanaka (loan to FC Ryukyu)
15	FW	JPN	Taisei Kadoguchi (loan to Tokyo Musashino City FC)
23	GK	JPN	Akihisa Okada (loan to Suzuka Unlimited FC)
31	DF	KOR	Kwon Young-jin (released)

=== Montedio Yamagata ===
In: Note: Flags indicate national team as defined under FIFA eligibility rules; some limited exceptions apply. Players may hold more than one non-FIFA nationality.

No.	Pos.	Nation	Player
19	MF	JPN	Tetsuro Ota (loan from Sagan Tosu)
31	MF	JPN	Kaito Anzai (loan from Kashiwa Reysol)
32	MF	JPN	Yoichi Naganuma (on loan from Sanfrecce Hiroshima)
33	DF	JPN	Ryoma Nishimura (on loan from Albirex Niigata)
—	MF	JPN	Shuto Kitagawa (from Tsukuba University)

Out: Note: Flags indicate national team as defined under FIFA eligibility rules; some limited exceptions apply. Players may hold more than one non-FIFA nationality.

No.	Pos.	Nation	Player
29	MF	KOR	Koo Bon-hyeok (loan to Tegevajaro Miyazaki)

=== V-Varen Nagasaki ===
In: Note: Flags indicate national team as defined under FIFA eligibility rules; some limited exceptions apply. Players may hold more than one non-FIFA nationality.

No.	Pos.	Nation	Player
35	DF	JPN	Yuki Kagawa (from Renofa Yamaguchi)
37	FW	JPN	Shu Hiramatsu (on loan from Albirex Niigata)
39	MF	JPN	Mitsuru Maruoka (loan from Cerezo Osaka)

Out: Note: Flags indicate national team as defined under FIFA eligibility rules; some limited exceptions apply. Players may hold more than one non-FIFA nationality.

No.	Pos.	Nation	Player
11	FW	JPN	Junki Hata (on loan to Azul Claro Numazu)
25	MF	JPN	Kohei Kitagawa (to Fujieda MYFC)

=== Roasso Kumamoto ===
In: Note: Flags indicate national team as defined under FIFA eligibility rules; some limited exceptions apply. Players may hold more than one non-FIFA nationality.

No.	Pos.	Nation	Player
15	MF	JPN	Ryota Tanabe (on loan from Nagoya Grampus)
24	MF	JPN	Yuji Kimura (on loan from Tokushima Vortis)
35	GK	JPN	Kei Uchiyama (from Tokyo Musashino City FC)
37	DF	BRA	Júnior Fell (from (Brazil) Metropolitano)

Out: Note: Flags indicate national team as defined under FIFA eligibility rules; some limited exceptions apply. Players may hold more than one non-FIFA nationality.

No.	Pos.	Nation	Player
10	FW	JPN	Ryuichi Hirashige (loan to Kataller Toyama)
29	FW	JPN	Keita Saito (to Mito HollyHock)
33	DF	JPN	Jun Sonoda (loan to Fujieda MYFC)

=== Thespakusatsu Gunma ===
In: Note: Flags indicate national team as defined under FIFA eligibility rules; some limited exceptions apply. Players may hold more than one non-FIFA nationality.

No.	Pos.	Nation	Player
33	FW	KOR	Kang Soo-il (free agent)
37	MF	JPN	Naoya Yoshida (from Tonan Maebashi)
43	DF	KOR	Yeo Sung-hye (from Matsumoto Yamaga)

Out: Note: Flags indicate national team as defined under FIFA eligibility rules; some limited exceptions apply. Players may hold more than one non-FIFA nationality.

No.	Pos.	Nation	Player
13	FW	JPN	Yosuke Komuta (loan to Fukushima United)
17	DF	JPN	Masato Fujiwara (on loan to Tonan Maebashi)
25	FW	JPN	Takuya Iwata (loan to SC Sagamihara)
29	MF	JPN	Junki Sato (to Tonan Maebashi)
32	DF	JPN	Toshiki Nakamura (on loan to Tonan Maebashi)
34	MF	JPN	Shunta Shimura (to Tonan Maebashi)
38	FW	KOR	Lee Kang-uk (released)
39	MF	JPN	Ryonosuke Hayasaka (to Tonan Maebashi)
42	GK	KOR	Han Ho-dang (to Tonan Maebashi)

=== Tokyo Verdy ===
In: Note: Flags indicate national team as defined under FIFA eligibility rules; some limited exceptions apply. Players may hold more than one non-FIFA nationality.

No.	Pos.	Nation	Player
13	FW	ESP	Carlos Martínez (from (Spain) Villarreal CF B)

Out: Note: Flags indicate national team as defined under FIFA eligibility rules; some limited exceptions apply. Players may hold more than one non-FIFA nationality.

No.	Pos.	Nation	Player
11	MF	JPN	Masaomi Nakano (loan to FC Imabari)

=== Kamatamare Sanuki ===
In: Note: Flags indicate national team as defined under FIFA eligibility rules; some limited exceptions apply. Players may hold more than one non-FIFA nationality.

No.	Pos.	Nation	Player
31	DF	BRA	Alex (free agent)
32	DF	KOR	Lee Joo-young (on loan from JEF United Chiba)

Out: Note: Flags indicate national team as defined under FIFA eligibility rules; some limited exceptions apply. Players may hold more than one non-FIFA nationality.

No.	Pos.	Nation	Player

=== FC Gifu ===
In: Note: Flags indicate national team as defined under FIFA eligibility rules; some limited exceptions apply. Players may hold more than one non-FIFA nationality.

No.	Pos.	Nation	Player
29	FW	JPN	Daiki Enomoto (from Tokai Gakuen University)
30	MF	JPN	Kensei Nakashima (loan from Yokohama F. Marinos)

Out: Note: Flags indicate national team as defined under FIFA eligibility rules; some limited exceptions apply. Players may hold more than one non-FIFA nationality.

No.	Pos.	Nation	Player

=== Zweigen Kanazawa ===
In: Note: Flags indicate national team as defined under FIFA eligibility rules; some limited exceptions apply. Players may hold more than one non-FIFA nationality.

No.	Pos.	Nation	Player
22	GK	JPN	Ken Tajiri (loan from Gamba Osaka)
33	DF	KOR	Byeon Jun-byum (loan from Shimizu S-Pulse)
39	DF	JPN	Honoya Shoji (loan from Cerezo Osaka)
45	DF	JPN	Keigo Numata (from Omiya Ardija)

Out: Note: Flags indicate national team as defined under FIFA eligibility rules; some limited exceptions apply. Players may hold more than one non-FIFA nationality.

No.	Pos.	Nation	Player
8	MF	JPN	Kenta Yamafuji (on loan to Giravanz Kitakyushu)
13	DF	JPN	Kodai Enomoto (on loan to Iwaki FC)
16	DF	BRA	Mendes (to Tochigi SC)

=== Oita Trinita ===
In: Note: Flags indicate national team as defined under FIFA eligibility rules; some limited exceptions apply. Players may hold more than one non-FIFA nationality.

No.	Pos.	Nation	Player
10	MF	BRA	Chiquinho (loan from (Brazil) Coimbra EC)
22	GK	KOR	Mun Kyung-gun (from Kwangwoon University)
42	DF	JPN	Masato Tokida (on loan from Vegalta Sendai)

Out: Note: Flags indicate national team as defined under FIFA eligibility rules; some limited exceptions apply. Players may hold more than one non-FIFA nationality.

No.	Pos.	Nation	Player
28	MF	JPN	Daisuke Sakai (on loan to (Belgium) Tubize)
36	MF	JPN	Takuya Nogami (on loan to Verspah Oita)

== J3 League ==
=== Giravanz Kitakyushu ===
In: Note: Flags indicate national team as defined under FIFA eligibility rules; some limited exceptions apply. Players may hold more than one non-FIFA nationality.

No.	Pos.	Nation	Player
22	MF	JPN	Kenta Yamafuji (on loan from Zweigen Kanazawa)
31	MF	JPN	Naoto Ando (from Tochigi SC)

Out: Note: Flags indicate national team as defined under FIFA eligibility rules; some limited exceptions apply. Players may hold more than one non-FIFA nationality.

No.	Pos.	Nation	Player
22	MF	JPN	Shuto Nakahara (to Kagoshima United FC)

=== Tochigi SC ===
In: Note: Flags indicate national team as defined under FIFA eligibility rules; some limited exceptions apply. Players may hold more than one non-FIFA nationality.

No.	Pos.	Nation	Player
20	FW	JPN	Takumu Fujinuma (on loan from Omiya Ardija)
22	DF	BRA	Mendes (from Zweigen Kanazawa)
25	FW	SLO	Nejc Pecnik (from Omiya Ardija)
27	FW	JPN	Shota Sakaki (from (Austria) SV Horn)
29	DF	JPN	Kento Kawata (on loan from Omiya Ardija)
43	MF	JPN	Masahiro Hoshito (from Sakushin Gakuin University)

Out: Note: Flags indicate national team as defined under FIFA eligibility rules; some limited exceptions apply. Players may hold more than one non-FIFA nationality.

No.	Pos.	Nation	Player
3	DF	JPN	Takamasa Taneoka (to Tokyo Musashino City FC)
9	FW	JPN	Koki Takenaka (on loan to Vanraure Hachinohe)
28	MF	JPN	Naoto Ando (to Giravanz Kitakyushu)
33	DF	JPN	Masashi Nito (on loan to FC Casa Fortuna Oyama)

=== Nagano Parceiro ===
In: Note: Flags indicate national team as defined under FIFA eligibility rules; some limited exceptions apply. Players may hold more than one non-FIFA nationality.

No.	Pos.	Nation	Player
30	FW	JPN	Hiroki Bandai (loan from Mito HollyHock)
50	FW	JPN	Hideya Okamoto (from Renofa Yamaguchi)

Out: Note: Flags indicate national team as defined under FIFA eligibility rules; some limited exceptions apply. Players may hold more than one non-FIFA nationality.

No.	Pos.	Nation	Player

=== Blaublitz Akita ===
In: Note: Flags indicate national team as defined under FIFA eligibility rules; some limited exceptions apply. Players may hold more than one non-FIFA nationality.

No.	Pos.	Nation	Player
2	MF	JPN	Tatsuro Inui (from (Thailand) Thai Honda Ladkrabang FC)

Out: Note: Flags indicate national team as defined under FIFA eligibility rules; some limited exceptions apply. Players may hold more than one non-FIFA nationality.

No.	Pos.	Nation	Player

=== Kagoshima United F.C. ===
In: Note: Flags indicate national team as defined under FIFA eligibility rules; some limited exceptions apply. Players may hold more than one non-FIFA nationality.

No.	Pos.	Nation	Player
30	FW	MKD	Dorian Babunski (loan from Machida Zelvia)
38	MF	JPN	Shuto Nakahara (from Giravanz Kitakyushu)

Out: Note: Flags indicate national team as defined under FIFA eligibility rules; some limited exceptions apply. Players may hold more than one non-FIFA nationality.

No.	Pos.	Nation	Player

=== Kataller Toyama ===
In: Note: Flags indicate national team as defined under FIFA eligibility rules; some limited exceptions apply. Players may hold more than one non-FIFA nationality.

No.	Pos.	Nation	Player
30	DF	JPN	Tetsushi Kondo (on loan from Fagiano Okayama)
39	DF	JPN	Kazuki Sato (on loan from Mito HollyHock)
45	FW	JPN	Ryuichi Hirashige (loan from Roasso Kumamoto)

Out: Note: Flags indicate national team as defined under FIFA eligibility rules; some limited exceptions apply. Players may hold more than one non-FIFA nationality.

No.	Pos.	Nation	Player
26	MF	JPN	Junki Mawatari (on loan to Amitie SC Kyoto)
27	DF	JPN	Genki Ishisaka (loan to Briobecca Urayasu)

=== Fujieda MYFC ===
In: Note: Flags indicate national team as defined under FIFA eligibility rules; some limited exceptions apply. Players may hold more than one non-FIFA nationality.

No.	Pos.	Nation	Player
33	DF	JPN	Jun Sonoda (on loan from Roasso Kumamoto)
34	FW	JPN	Junki Hata (on loan from V-Varen Nagasaki)
35	DF	JPN	Makito Ito (on loan from Mito HollyHock)

Out: Note: Flags indicate national team as defined under FIFA eligibility rules; some limited exceptions apply. Players may hold more than one non-FIFA nationality.

No.	Pos.	Nation	Player
25	MF	JPN	Takashi Soeda (to Amitie SC Kyoto)

=== F.C. Ryukyu ===
In: Note: Flags indicate national team as defined under FIFA eligibility rules; some limited exceptions apply. Players may hold more than one non-FIFA nationality.

No.	Pos.	Nation	Player
30	MF	JPN	Keita Tanaka (on loan from Mito HollyHock)
31	MF	JPN	Kazaki Nakagawa (loan from (Spain) Betis San Isidro)

Out: Note: Flags indicate national team as defined under FIFA eligibility rules; some limited exceptions apply. Players may hold more than one non-FIFA nationality.

No.	Pos.	Nation	Player

=== S.C. Sagamihara ===
In: Note: Flags indicate national team as defined under FIFA eligibility rules; some limited exceptions apply. Players may hold more than one non-FIFA nationality.

No.	Pos.	Nation	Player
18	FW	JPN	Seiya Matsuki (from (Germany) FV 07 Diefflen)
29	FW	JPN	Takuya Iwata (on loan from Thespakusatsu Gunma)
30	MF	JPN	Mizuki Arai (from (Austria) SV Horn)
32	GK	JPN	Shun Yoshida (from Hosei University)

Out: Note: Flags indicate national team as defined under FIFA eligibility rules; some limited exceptions apply. Players may hold more than one non-FIFA nationality.

No.	Pos.	Nation	Player
2	DF	BRA	Breno César (released])
8	MF	JPN	Keita Sogabe (to Nara Club)

=== Grulla Morioka ===
In: Note: Flags indicate national team as defined under FIFA eligibility rules; some limited exceptions apply. Players may hold more than one non-FIFA nationality.

No.	Pos.	Nation	Player
27	DF	CHN	Yang Fan (on loan from (China) Shanghai SIPG)
28	MF	JPN	Yuto Sashinami (on loan from Vegalta Sendai)

Out: Note: Flags indicate national team as defined under FIFA eligibility rules; some limited exceptions apply. Players may hold more than one non-FIFA nationality.

No.	Pos.	Nation	Player

=== Fukushima United F.C. ===
In: Note: Flags indicate national team as defined under FIFA eligibility rules; some limited exceptions apply. Players may hold more than one non-FIFA nationality.

No.	Pos.	Nation	Player
1	GK	JPN	Go Ito (on loan from Shonan Bellmare)
22	MF	BRA	Nildo (from (Brazil) EC Taubaté)
26	FW	JPN	Yosuke Komuta (on loan from Thespakusatsu Gunma)
31	DF	JPN	Seiji Kawakami (from Sendai University)
43	MF	JPN	Takaaki Shichi (on loan from Matsumoto Yamaga)

Out: Note: Flags indicate national team as defined under FIFA eligibility rules; some limited exceptions apply. Players may hold more than one non-FIFA nationality.

No.	Pos.	Nation	Player

=== Gainare Tottori ===
In: Note: Flags indicate national team as defined under FIFA eligibility rules; some limited exceptions apply. Players may hold more than one non-FIFA nationality.

No.	Pos.	Nation	Player

Out: Note: Flags indicate national team as defined under FIFA eligibility rules; some limited exceptions apply. Players may hold more than one non-FIFA nationality.

No.	Pos.	Nation	Player

=== YSCC Yokohama ===
In: Note: Flags indicate national team as defined under FIFA eligibility rules; some limited exceptions apply. Players may hold more than one non-FIFA nationality.

No.	Pos.	Nation	Player

Out: Note: Flags indicate national team as defined under FIFA eligibility rules; some limited exceptions apply. Players may hold more than one non-FIFA nationality.

No.	Pos.	Nation	Player

=== Azul Claro Numazu ===
In: Note: Flags indicate national team as defined under FIFA eligibility rules; some limited exceptions apply. Players may hold more than one non-FIFA nationality.

No.	Pos.	Nation	Player
32	MF	JPN	Kohei Kitagawa (from V-Varen Nagasaki)

Out: Note: Flags indicate national team as defined under FIFA eligibility rules; some limited exceptions apply. Players may hold more than one non-FIFA nationality.

No.	Pos.	Nation	Player
23	MF	JPN	Kosuke Goto (on loan to Briobecca Urayasu)
