= List of J1 League football transfers winter 2018–19 =

This is a list of Japanese football J1 League transfers in the winter transfer window 2018–19 by club.

== J1 League ==
=== Kawasaki Frontale ===
In: Note: Flags indicate national team as defined under FIFA eligibility rules; some limited exceptions apply. Players may hold more than one non-FIFA nationality.

No.	Pos.	Nation	Player
4	DF	BRA	Jesiel (on loan from (Brazil) Atlético Mineiro)
9	FW	BRA	Leandro Damião (from (Brazil) Santos FC)
17	DF	JPN	Kazuaki Mawatari (from (Japan) Sanfrecce Hiroshima)
23	GK	JPN	Eisuke Fujishima (on loan from (Japan) Renofa Yamaguchi)
26	DF	BRA	Maguinho (from (Brazil) Vila Nova)
30	FW	JPN	Taisei Miyashiro (promoted from youth ranks)
31	MF	JPN	Koki Harada (from Shohei High School)
34	MF	JPN	Kazuya Yamamura (from (Japan) Cerezo Osaka)
—	DF	JPN	Ko Itakura (from (Japan) Vegalta Sendai, end of loan)
—	MF	JPN	Koji Miyoshi (from (Japan) Hokkaido Consadole Sapporo, end of loan)

Out: Note: Flags indicate national team as defined under FIFA eligibility rules; some limited exceptions apply. Players may hold more than one non-FIFA nationality.

No.	Pos.	Nation	Player
6	MF	JPN	Yusuke Tasaka (to (Japan) JEF United Chiba)
9	FW	JPN	Shuhei Akasaki (on loan to (Japan) Nagoya Grampus)
17	DF	JPN	Yuto Takeoka (to (Japan) Ventforet Kofu)
18	DF	BRA	Elsinho (to (Japan) Shimizu S-Pulse)
19	MF	JPN	Kentaro Moriya (to (Japan) Jubilo Iwata)
23	DF	BRA	Eduardo (to (Japan) Matsumoto Yamaga)
26	DF	JPN	Jefferson Tabinas (on loan to (Japan) FC Gifu)
31	GK	JPN	William Popp (on loan to (Japan) Oita Trinita)
—	DF	JPN	Ko Itakura (to (England) Manchester City)
—	MF	JPN	Koji Miyoshi (on loan to (Japan) Yokohama F. Marinos)

=== Sanfrecce Hiroshima ===
In: Note: Flags indicate national team as defined under FIFA eligibility rules; some limited exceptions apply. Players may hold more than one non-FIFA nationality.

No.	Pos.	Nation	Player
3	DF	SWE	Emil Salomonsson (from (Sweden) IFK Goteborg)
7	MF	JPN	Gakuto Notsuda (from (Japan) Vegalta Sendai, end of loan)
10	FW	BRA	Patric (from (Brazil) Salgueiro, previously on loan)
13	DF	JPN	Akira Ibayashi (from (Japan) Tokyo Verdy)
17	MF	JPN	Hiroya Matsumoto (promoted from youth ranks)
20	FW	BRA	Douglas Vieira (from (Japan) Tokyo Verdy)
22	FW	JPN	Yusuke Minagawa (from (Japan) Roasso Kumamoto, end of loan)
23	DF	JPN	Hayato Araki (from Kansai University)
24	MF	JPN	Shunki Higashi (promoted from youth ranks)
27	MF	JPN	Kohei Shimizu (on loan from (Japan) Shimizu S-Pulse)
50	DF	JPN	Soya Takahashi (from (Japan) Fagiano Okayama, end of loan)
—	GK	JPN	Takuya Masuda (from (Japan) V-Varen Nagasaki, end of loan)
—	MF	JPN	Yoichi Naganuma (from (Japan) FC Gifu, end of loan)

Out: Note: Flags indicate national team as defined under FIFA eligibility rules; some limited exceptions apply. Players may hold more than one non-FIFA nationality.

No.	Pos.	Nation	Player
5	DF	JPN	Kazuhiko Chiba (to (Japan) Nagoya Grampus)
7	MF	JPN	Kazuyuki Morisaki (retired)
9	FW	JPN	Masato Kudo (on loan to (Japan) Renofa Yamaguchi)
10	MF	BRA	Felipe Silva (to (Brazil) Ceará)
20	FW	THA	Teerasil Dangda (to (Thailand) Muangthong United, end of loan)
27	DF	JPN	Kazuaki Mawatari (to (Japan) Kawasaki Frontale)
29	MF	JPN	Takumu Kawamura (on loan to (Japan) Ehime FC)
—	GK	JPN	Takuya Masuda (on loan to (Japan) Machida Zelvia)
—	DF	JPN	Kazuya Miyahara (to (Japan) Nagoya Grampus, previously on loan)
—	MF	JPN	Yoichi Naganuma (on loan to (Japan) Ehime FC)

=== Kashima Antlers ===
In: Note: Flags indicate national team as defined under FIFA eligibility rules; some limited exceptions apply. Players may hold more than one non-FIFA nationality.

No.	Pos.	Nation	Player
15	FW	JPN	Sho Ito (from (Japan) Yokohama F. Marinos)
17	MF	JPN	Taiki Hirato (from (Japan) Machida Zelvia, end of loan)
27	DF	BRA	Bueno (from (Japan) Tokushima Vortis, end of loan)
30	MF	JPN	Shintaro Nago (from Juntendo University)
33	DF	JPN	Ikumi Sekigawa (from Ryutsu Keizai University Kashiwa High School)
34	MF	JPN	Kotaro Arima (promoted from youth ranks)
35	DF	JPN	Shogo Sasaki (promoted from youth ranks)
41	MF	JPN	Ryohei Shirasaki (from (Japan) Shimizu S-Pulse)
—	DF	JPN	Ayase Ueda (from Hosei University)
—	MF	JPN	Taro Sugimoto (from (Japan) Tokushima Vortis, end of loan)
—	MF	BRA	Pedro Júnior (from (China) Wuhan Zall, end of loan)

Out: Note: Flags indicate national team as defined under FIFA eligibility rules; some limited exceptions apply. Players may hold more than one non-FIFA nationality.

No.	Pos.	Nation	Player
3	DF	JPN	Gen Shoji (to (France) Toulouse FC)
15	DF	JPN	Yuto Misao (to (Japan) Oita Trinita)
22	DF	JPN	Daigo Nishi (to (Japan) Vissel Kobe)
26	MF	JPN	Kazune Kubota (on loan to (Japan) Fagiano Okayama)
36	MF	JPN	Toshiya Tanaka (to (Japan) Thespakusatsu Gunma)
40	MF	JPN	Mitsuo Ogasawara (retired)
—	MF	JPN	Taro Sugimoto (to (Japan) Matsumoto Yamaga)
—	FW	BRA	Pedro Júnior (to (Brazil) Fortaleza EC)

=== Hokkaido Consadole Sapporo ===
In: Note: Flags indicate national team as defined under FIFA eligibility rules; some limited exceptions apply. Players may hold more than one non-FIFA nationality.

No.	Pos.	Nation	Player
6	MF	JPN	Shogo Nakahara (from (Japan) V-Varen Nagasaki, end of loan)
7	MF	BRA	Lucas Fernandes (on loan from (Brazil) Fluminense FC)
9	MF	JPN	Musashi Suzuki (from (Japan) V-Varen Nagasaki)
11	FW	BRA	Anderson Lopes (from (South Korea) FC Seoul)
13	FW	JPN	Yuto Iwasaki (from (Japan) Kyoto Sanga)
14	MF	JPN	Yoshiaki Komai (from (Japan) Urawa Red Diamonds, previously on loan)
17	MF	JPN	Riku Danzaki (from Aomori Yamada High School)
23	MF	JPN	Yoshihiro Nakano (from (Japan) Vegalta Sendai)
24	DF	JPN	Toya Nakamura (promoted from youth ranks)
—	MF	JPN	Yohei Homma (promoted from youth ranks)
—	DF	JPN	Yuto Nagasaka (from (Japan) Mito HollyHock, end of loan)
—	DF	JPN	Tomonobu Yokoyama (from (Japan) Roasso Kumamoto, end of loan)
—	MF	BRA	Julinho (from (Japan) Renofa Yamaguchi, end of loan)

Out: Note: Flags indicate national team as defined under FIFA eligibility rules; some limited exceptions apply. Players may hold more than one non-FIFA nationality.

No.	Pos.	Nation	Player
3	DF	JPN	Yudai Tanaka (to (Japan) Blaublitz Akita)
4	DF	JPN	Ryuji Kawai (retired)
6	MF	JPN	Shingo Hyodo (to (Japan) Vegalta Sendai)
9	FW	JPN	Ken Tokura (to (Japan) Cerezo Osaka)
13	FW	JPN	Yoshihiro Uchimura (to (Japan) FC Imabari)
15	DF	JPN	Naoya Kikuchi (to (Japan) Avispa Fukuoka)
20	MF	JPN	Junichi Inamoto (to (Japan) SC Sagamihara)
31	FW	JPN	Takumi Miyayoshi (to (Japan) Kyoto Sanga)
41	MF	JPN	Koji Miyoshi (to (Japan) Kawasaki Frontale, end of loan)
—	DF	JPN	Yuto Nagasaka (released)
—	DF	JPN	Tomonobu Yokoyama (released)
—	MF	BRA	Julinho (to (Brazil) Avaí FC)
—	MF	JPN	Hiroyuki Mae (to (Japan) Mito HollyHock, previously on loan)
—	FW	JPN	Hidetaka Kanazono (to (Japan) Ventforet Kofu, previously on loan)

=== Urawa Red Diamonds ===
In: Note: Flags indicate national team as defined under FIFA eligibility rules; some limited exceptions apply. Players may hold more than one non-FIFA nationality.

No.	Pos.	Nation	Player
4	DF	JPN	Daisuke Suzuki (from (Japan) Kashiwa Reysol)
6	DF	JPN	Ryosuke Yamanaka (from (Japan) Montedio Yamagata)
8	MF	BRA	Ewerton (on loan from (Portugal) Porto)
14	FW	JPN	Kenyu Sugimoto (from (Japan) Cerezo Osaka)
24	MF	JPN	Koya Yuruki (from (Japan) Montedio Yamagata)
28	DF	JPN	Katsuya Iwatake (from Meiji University)
32	GK	JPN	Ryo Ishii (promoted from youth ranks)
33	MF	JPN	Nobuki Iketaka (promoted from youth ranks)
34	DF	JPN	Kei Oshiro (promoted from youth ranks)
—	MF	JPN	Ryotaro Ito (from (Japan) Mito HollyHock, end of loan)
—	FW	JPN	Ado Onaiwu (from (Japan) Renofa Yamaguchi, end of loan)

Out: Note: Flags indicate national team as defined under FIFA eligibility rules; some limited exceptions apply. Players may hold more than one non-FIFA nationality.

No.	Pos.	Nation	Player
7	MF	JPN	Kosuke Taketomi (on loan to (Japan) Shonan Bellmare)
14	DF	JPN	Tadaaki Hirakawa (retired)
20	FW	JPN	Tadanari Lee (to (Japan) Yokohama F. Marinos)
21	FW	SLO	Zlatan Ljubijankič (released)
25	GK	JPN	Tetsuya Enomoto (to (Japan) Kataller Toyama)
38	MF	JPN	Daisuke Kikuchi (to (Japan) Kashiwa Reysol)
—	DF	JPN	Takuya Okamoto (to (Japan) Shonan Bellmare, previously on loan)
—	MF	JPN	Yoshiaki Komai (to (Japan) Hokkaido Consadole Sapporo, previously on loan)
—	MF	JPN	Ryotaro Ito (on loan to (Japan) Oita Trinita)
—	FW	JPN	Ado Onaiwu (on loan to (Japan) Oita Trinita)

=== FC Tokyo ===
In: Note: Flags indicate national team as defined under FIFA eligibility rules; some limited exceptions apply. Players may hold more than one non-FIFA nationality.

No.	Pos.	Nation	Player
1	GK	JPN	Tsuyoshi Kodama (from (Japan) Montedio Yamagata)
5	MF	JPN	Daiki Niwa (from (Japan) Sanfrecce Hiroshima)
9	FW	BRA	Diego Oliveira (from (Japan) Kashiwa Reysol, previously on loan)
15	MF	JPN	Takefusa Kubo (from (Japan) Yokohama F. Marinos, end of loan)
17	MF	KOR	Na Sang-ho (from (South Korea) Gwangju FC)
19	MF	JPN	Kiwara Miyazaki (from (Japan) Albirex Niigata)
21	MF	KOR	Yu In-soo (from (South Korea) Avispa Fukuoka, end of loan)
22	DF	JPN	Takumi Nakamura (from Higashi Fukuoka High School)
27	FW	JPN	Kyosuke Tagawa (from (Japan) Sagan Tosu)
31	FW	THA	Nattawut Suksum (on loan from (Thailand) Bangkok United FC)
32	DF	JPN	Tsuyoshi Watanabe (from Chuo University)
45	MF	BRA	Arthur Silva (on loan from (Brazil) CA Votuporanguense)
—	MF	JPN	Yohei Kajiyama (from (Japan) Albirex Niigata, end of loan)

Out: Note: Flags indicate national team as defined under FIFA eligibility rules; some limited exceptions apply. Players may hold more than one non-FIFA nationality.

No.	Pos.	Nation	Player
1	GK	JPN	Takuo Okubo (to (Japan) Sagan Tosu)
7	MF	JPN	Takuji Yonemoto (to (Japan) Nagoya Grampus)
11	FW	JPN	Ryoichi Maeda (to (Japan) FC Gifu)
13	FW	BRA	Lins (to (Japan) Ventforet Kofu, end of loan)
19	MF	JPN	Tasuku Hiraoka (to (Japan) Tochigi SC)
22	DF	JPN	Masayuki Yamada (on loan to (Japan) Machida Zelvia)
26	DF	JPN	Takahiro Yanagi (on loan to (Japan) Montedio Yamagata)
27	MF	JPN	Sotan Tanabe (to (Japan) Avispa Fukuoka)
30	GK	JPN	Riku Hirosue (on loan to (Japan) Renofa Yamaguchi)
51	MF	BRA	Lipe Veloso (to (Ukraine) FC Lviv)
52	MF	THA	Jakkit Wachpirom (to (Thailand) Bangkok United FC, end of loan)
—	MF	JPN	Yohei Kajiyama (retired)
—	FW	JPN	Cayman Togashi (to (Japan) Yokohama F. Marinos, end of loan)

=== Cerezo Osaka ===
In: Note: Flags indicate national team as defined under FIFA eligibility rules; some limited exceptions apply. Players may hold more than one non-FIFA nationality.

No.	Pos.	Nation	Player
1	GK	JPN	Kentaro Kakoi (from (Japan) Avispa Fukuoka, end of loan)
5	MF	JPN	Naoyuki Fujita (from (Japan) Vissel Kobe)
6	MF	ARG	Leandro Luis Desábato (from (Brazil) Vasco da Gama)
9	FW	JPN	Ken Tokura (from (Japan) Hokkaido Consadole Sapporo)
20	FW	BRA	Bruno Mendes (from (Uruguay) Deportivo Maldonado)
25	MF	JPN	Hiroaki Okuno (from (Japan) Vegalta Sendai)
39	MF	JPN	Mitsuru Maruoka (from (Japan) Renofa Yamaguchi, end of loan)
—	DF	JPN	Honoya Shoji (from (Japan) Zweigen Kanazawa, end of loan)
—	MF	JPN	Taiga Maekawa (from (Japan) Tokushima Vortis, end of loan)
—	FW	JPN	Takeru Kishimoto (from (Japan) Mito HollyHock, end of loan)

Out: Note: Flags indicate national team as defined under FIFA eligibility rules; some limited exceptions apply. Players may hold more than one non-FIFA nationality.

No.	Pos.	Nation	Player
1	GK	JPN	Takumi Nagaishi (on loan to (Japan) Renofa Yamaguchi)
3	DF	JPN	Teruyuki Moniwa (to (Japan) FC Maruyasu Okazaki)
5	DF	JPN	Yusuke Tanaka (to (Japan) Fagiano Okayama)
9	FW	JPN	Kenyu Sugimoto (to (Japan) Urawa Red Diamonds)
10	MF	JPN	Hotaru Yamaguchi (to (Japan) Vissel Kobe)
20	DF	JPN	Noriyuki Sakemoto (to (Japan) Kagoshima United FC)
24	MF	JPN	Kazuya Yamamura (to (Japan) Kawasaki Frontale)
33	FW	JPN	Rei Yonezawa (to (Japan) Kagoshima United FC)
35	MF	JPN	Masaki Okino (to (Japan) Blaublitz Akita)
37	DF	JPN	Reiya Morishita (on loan to (Japan) Tochigi SC)
39	MF	THA	Chaowat Veerachat (to (Thailand) Bangkok Glass FC, end of loan)
43	MF	ESP	Osmar Ibáñez (to (South Korea) FC Seoul, end of loan)
50	DF	JPN	Ryoga Ishio (to (Japan) Zweigen Kanazawa)
57	MF	JPN	Hinata Kida (on loan to (Japan) Avispa Fukuoka)
—	DF	JPN	Honoya Shoji (on loan to (Japan) Oita Trinita)
—	MF	JPN	Taiga Maekawa (on loan to (Japan) Avispa Fukuoka)
—	FW	JPN	Takeru Kishimoto (on loan to (Japan) Tokushima Vortis)

=== Shimizu S-Pulse ===
In: Note: Flags indicate national team as defined under FIFA eligibility rules; some limited exceptions apply. Players may hold more than one non-FIFA nationality.

No.	Pos.	Nation	Player
14	MF	JPN	Jumpei Kusukami (from (Japan) Montedio Yamagata, end of loan)
16	MF	JPN	Kenta Nishizawa (from University of Tsukuba)
18	DF	BRA	Elsinho (from (Japan) Kawasaki Frontale)
20	MF	JPN	Keita Nakamura (from (Japan) V-Varen Nagasaki)
22	MF	BRA	Renato Augusto (from (Brazil) Palmeiras)
31	GK	JPN	Togo Umeda (promoted from youth ranks)
33	DF	BRA	Wanderson (on loan from (Brazil) Atletico Paranaense)
—	GK	JPN	Toru Takizawa (from (Japan) JEF United Chiba, end of loan)
—	DF	KOR	Wo Shao-cong (from (Japan) Kyoto Sanga, end of loan)
—	MF	JPN	Kohei Shimizu (from (Japan) Ventforet Kofu, end of loan)
—	MF	JPN	Takuma Edamura (from (Japan) Avispa Fukuoka, end of loan)

Out: Note: Flags indicate national team as defined under FIFA eligibility rules; some limited exceptions apply. Players may hold more than one non-FIFA nationality.

No.	Pos.	Nation	Player
4	DF	JPN	Freire (to (Japan) Shonan Bellmare)
10	MF	JPN	Ryohei Shirasaki (to (Japan) Kashima Antlers)
11	MF	JPN	Kazuya Murata (to (Japan) Kashiwa Reysol)
15	MF	JPN	Akihiro Hyodo (retired)
18	FW	JPN	Yu Hasegawa (to (Japan) V-Varen Nagasaki)
19	FW	AUS	Mitchell Duke (to (Australia) Western Sydney Wanderers)
20	FW	BRA	Crislan (to (Portugal) SC Braga, end of loan)
24	MF	KOR	Chikashi Masuda (on loan to (South Korea) Seoul E-Land)
31	GK	JPN	Yoshiaki Arai (on loan to (Japan) Zweigen Kanazawa)
43	GK	JPN	Yuji Uekusa (retired)
45	DF	JPN	Makoto Kakuda (to (Japan) V-Varen Nagasaki)
—	MF	JPN	Kohei Shimizu (on loan to (Japan) Sanfrecce Hiroshima)
—	MF	JPN	Takuma Edamura (to (Japan) Tochigi SC)

=== Gamba Osaka ===
In: Note: Flags indicate national team as defined under FIFA eligibility rules; some limited exceptions apply. Players may hold more than one non-FIFA nationality.

No.	Pos.	Nation	Player
6	MF	JPN	Tatsuya Tanaka (from (Japan) Roasso Kumamoto)
19	DF	KOR	Kim Young-gwon (from (China) Guangzhou Evergrande)
20	FW	JPN	Hiroto Goya (from (Japan) Tokushima Vortis, end of loan)
21	MF	JPN	Shinya Yajima (from (Japan) Vegalta Sendai, end of loan)
26	MF	JPN	Kohei Okuno (promoted from youth ranks)
27	DF	JPN	Ryo Takuo (from Kwansei Gakuin University)
30	DF	JPN	Naoaki Aoyama (from (Thailand) Muangthong United)
31	GK	JPN	Ken Tajiri (from (Japan) Zweigen Kanazawa, end of loan)
—	DF	KOR	Bae Soo-yong (from (Japan) Giravanz Kitakyushu, end of loan)
—	DF	JPN	So Hirao (from (Japan) Avispa Fukuoka, end of loan)
—	MF	JPN	Takahiro Futagawa (from (Japan) Tochigi SC, end of loan)
—	MF	JPN	Jin Izumisawa (from (Japan) Tokyo Verdy, end of loan)

Out: Note: Flags indicate national team as defined under FIFA eligibility rules; some limited exceptions apply. Players may hold more than one non-FIFA nationality.

No.	Pos.	Nation	Player
2	DF	JPN	Takaharu Nishino (to (Japan) Kamatamare Sanuki)
3	DF	BRA	Fábio (released)
5	DF	JPN	Ryo Hatsuse (to (Japan) Vissel Kobe)
18	FW	JPN	Kazunari Ichimi (on loan to (Japan) Kyoto Sanga)
24	MF	JPN	Haruya Ide (to (Japan) Montedio Yamagata)
26	MF	JPN	Naoya Senoo (to (Japan) Nagano Parceiro)
27	MF	JPN	Yuto Mori (to (Japan) Mito HollyHock)
31	GK	JPN	Ryota Suzuki (on loan to (Japan) JEF United Chiba)
—	DF	JPN	Bae Soo-yong (on loan to (Japan) Kamatamare Sanuki)
—	DF	JPN	So Hirao (to (Japan) Machida Zelvia)
—	MF	JPN	Jin Izumisawa (to (Poland) Pogon Szczecin)
—	MF	JPN	Takahiro Futagawa (to (Japan) FC TIAMO Hirakata)
—	FW	JPN	Shun Nagasawa (to (Japan) Vegalta Sendai)

=== Vissel Kobe ===
In: Note: Flags indicate national team as defined under FIFA eligibility rules; some limited exceptions apply. Players may hold more than one non-FIFA nationality.

No.	Pos.	Nation	Player
5	MF	JPN	Hotaru Yamaguchi (from (Japan) Cerezo Osaka)
7	FW	ESP	David Villa (from (United States) New York City FC)
13	FW	JPN	Keijiro Ogawa (from (Japan) Shonan Bellmare, end of loan)
19	DF	JPN	Ryo Hatsuse (from (Japan) Gamba Osaka)
22	DF	JPN	Daigo Nishi (from (Japan) Kashima Antlers)
23	MF	BRA	Wescley (from (Brazil) Ceará SC, end of loan)
30	GK	JPN	Genta Ito (from Matsuyama Kogyo High School)
31	MF	JPN	Yuya Nakasaka (from (Spain) CF Peralada, end of loan)
40	DF	JPN	Yuki Kobayashi (promoted from youth ranks)
—	DF	JPN	Shinji Yamaguchi (from (Japan) Oita Trinita, end of loan)
—	MF	JPN	Seigo Kobayashi (from (Japan) Montedio Yamagata, end of loan)
—	FW	JPN	Mike Havenaar (from (Japan) Vegalta Sendai, end of loan)

Out: Note: Flags indicate national team as defined under FIFA eligibility rules; some limited exceptions apply. Players may hold more than one non-FIFA nationality.

No.	Pos.	Nation	Player
4	DF	JPN	Kunie Kitamoto (to (Thailand) Simork FC)
5	DF	QAT	Ahmed Yasser (to (Qatar) Al-Duhail SC, end of loan)
6	DF	JPN	Shunki Takahashi (to (Japan) Kashiwa Reysol)
14	MF	JPN	Naoyuki Fujita (to (Japan) Cerezo Osaka)
23	MF	JPN	Yoshiki Matsushita (to (Japan) Vegalta Sendai)
30	DF	THA	Theerathon Bunmathan (to (Thailand) Muangthong United, end of loan)
33	FW	JPN	Shuhei Otsuki (to (Japan) Montedio Yamagata)
39	DF	JPN	Masahiko Inoha (to (Japan) Yokohama FC)
50	FW	JPN	Shun Nagasawa (to (Japan) Gamba Osaka, end of loan)
—	DF	JPN	Shinji Yamaguchi (to (Japan) Nagano Parceiro)
—	DF	JPN	Junya Higashi (to (Japan) Fukushima United FC, previously on loan)
—	MF	JPN	Seigo Kobayashi (to (Japan) Oita Trinita)
—	MF	JPN	Ryosuke Maeda (to (Japan) Oita Trinita, previously on loan)

=== Vegalta Sendai ===
In: Note: Flags indicate national team as defined under FIFA eligibility rules; some limited exceptions apply. Players may hold more than one non-FIFA nationality.

No.	Pos.	Nation	Player
3	MF	JPN	Ryutaro Iio (from (Japan) V-Varen Nagasaki)
6	MF	JPN	Shingo Hyodo (from (Japan) Hokkaido Consadole Sapporo)
8	MF	JPN	Yoshiki Matsushita (from (Japan) Vissel Kobe)
14	MF	JPN	Takayoshi Ishihara (from (Japan) Matsumoto Yamaga)
15	MF	JPN	Kaina Yoshio (on loan from (Japan) Yokohama F. Marinos)
18	MF	JPN	Ryohei Michibuchi (from (Japan) Ventforet Kofu)
23	DF	MOZ	Simão Mate (from (Qatar) Al Ahli SC)
30	MF	JPN	Wataru Tanaka (from Kiryu Daiichi High School)
31	DF	JPN	Hayato Teruyama (from Seiritsu Gakuen High School)
38	FW	JPN	Shun Nagasawa (from (Japan) Gamba Osaka)
—	MF	JPN	Takumi Sasaki (from (Japan) Kamatamare Sanuki, end of loan)
—	MF	JPN	Yuto Sashinami (from (Japan) Kataller Toyama, end of loan)

Out: Note: Flags indicate national team as defined under FIFA eligibility rules; some limited exceptions apply. Players may hold more than one non-FIFA nationality.

No.	Pos.	Nation	Player
6	DF	JPN	Ko Itakura (to (Japan) Kawasaki Frontale, end of loan)
7	MF	JPN	Hiroaki Okuno (to (Japan) Cerezo Osaka)
15	MF	JPN	Shinya Yajima (to (Japan) Gamba Osaka, end of loan)
18	FW	BRA	Rafaelson (released)
23	MF	JPN	Yoshihiro Nakano (to (Japan) Hokkaido Consadole Sapporo)
25	MF	JPN	Naoki Sugai (retired)
29	MF	JPN	Shota Kobayashi (to (Japan) Shonan Bellmare)
35	GK	KOR	Lee Yun-Oh (on loan to (Japan) Fukushima United FC)
41	FW	JPN	Mike Havenaar (to (Japan) Vissel Kobe, end of loan)
—	DF	JPN	Masaya Kojima (on loan to (Japan) Zweigen Kanazawa)
—	MF	JPN	Yuto Sashinami (released)
—	MF	JPN	Takumi Sasaki (on loan to (Japan) Renofa Yamaguchi)
—	MF	JPN	Shunsuke Motegi (to (Japan) Mito HollyHock, previously on loan)
—	MF	JPN	Keita Fujimura (to (Japan) Zweigen Kanazawa, previously on loan)
—	MF	JPN	Yoshihiro Shoji (to (Japan) Kyoto Sanga, previously on loan)

=== Yokohama F. Marinos ===
In: Note: Flags indicate national team as defined under FIFA eligibility rules; some limited exceptions apply. Players may hold more than one non-FIFA nationality.

No.	Pos.	Nation	Player
1	GK	PRK	Park Iru-gyu (from (Japan) FC Ryukyu)
5	DF	THA	Theerathon Bunmathan (on loan from (Thailand) Muangthong United)
9	FW	BRA	Marcos Júnior (from (Brazil) Fluminense)
16	DF	JPN	Ryo Takano (from (Japan) Ventforet Kofu, end of loan)
18	DF	JPN	Rikuto Hirose (from (Japan) Tokushima Vortis)
20	FW	JPN	Tadanari Lee (from (Japan) Urawa Red Diamonds)
30	FW	BRA	Edigar Junio (on loan from (Brazil) EC Bahia)
38	FW	JPN	Yushi Yamaya (promoted from youth ranks)
40	MF	JPN	Naoki Tsubaki (promoted from youth ranks)
41	MF	JPN	Koji Miyoshi (on loan from (Japan) Kawasaki Frontale)
—	FW	JPN	Cayman Togashi (from (Japan) FC Tokyo, end of loan)
—	GK	JPN	Shunsuke Ozawa (promoted from youth ranks)
—	GK	JPN	Riku Terakado (promoted from youth ranks)
—	DF	JPN	Ko Ikeda (promoted from youth ranks)
—	FW	JPN	Noah Kenshin Brown (promoted from youth ranks)
—	FW	JPN	Takumi Tsukui (promoted from youth ranks)

Out: Note: Flags indicate national team as defined under FIFA eligibility rules; some limited exceptions apply. Players may hold more than one non-FIFA nationality.

No.	Pos.	Nation	Player
7	FW	POR	Hugo Vieira (to (Turkey) Sivasspor)
8	MF	JPN	Kosuke Nakamachi (to (Zambia) ZESCO United FC)
15	MF	JPN	Takefusa Kubo (to (Japan) FC Tokyo, end of loan)
16	FW	JPN	Sho Ito (to (Japan) Kashima Antlers)
20	MF	CMR	Olivier Boumal (to (Greece) Panionios)
22	DF	JPN	Yuji Nakazawa (retired)
26	DF	JPN	Ryosuke Yamanaka (to (Japan) Urawa Red Diamonds)
29	FW	JPN	Masashi Wada (on loan to (Japan) Blaublitz Akita)
30	GK	JPN	Ayaki Suzuki (to (Japan) V-Varen Nagasaki)
34	DF	JPN	Taiga Nishiyama (on loan to (Japan) ReinMeer Aomori)
35	MF	JPN	Kenta Hori (on loan to (Japan) Blaublitz Akita)
37	MF	JPN	Kaina Yoshio (on loan to (Japan) Vegalta Sendai)
39	FW	JPN	Shuto Machino (on loan to (Japan) Giravanz Kitakyushu)
—	DF	JPN	Jin Ikoma (on loan to (Japan) Giravanz Kitakyushu)
—	DF	JPN	Takumi Shimohira (to (Japan) JEF United Chiba, previously on loan)
—	FW	JPN	Cayman Togashi (to (Japan) Machida Zelvia)

=== Shonan Bellmare ===
In: Note: Flags indicate national team as defined under FIFA eligibility rules; some limited exceptions apply. Players may hold more than one non-FIFA nationality.

No.	Pos.	Nation	Player
3	DF	JPN	Freire (from (Japan) Shimizu S-Pulse)
6	DF	JPN	Takuya Okamoto (from (Japan) Urawa Red Diamonds, previously on loan)
9	FW	JPN	Hiroshi Ibusuki (from (Japan) JEF United Chiba)
14	MF	JPN	Hiroto Nakagawa (on loan from (Japan) Kashiwa Reysol)
17	MF	JPN	Hiroki Akino (from (Japan) Kashiwa Reysol, previously on loan)
22	MF	BRA	Lelêu (from (Brazil) Atlético Mineiro)
23	DF	JPN	Masahito Onoda (on loan from (Japan) FC Imabari)
25	GK	JPN	Shuhei Matsubara (from (Japan) Thespakusatsu Gunma)
28	MF	JPN	Toichi Suzuki (from Nagasaki IAS High School)
29	DF	JPN	Hayato Fukushima (from Ohzu High School)
30	MF	JPN	Sosuke Shibata (promoted from youth ranks)
34	DF	BRA	Rafael Dumas (from (Brazil) Flamengo)
37	FW	JPN	Yuki Ohashi (from Chuo University)
39	MF	JPN	Kosuke Taketomi (on loan from (Japan) Urawa Red Diamonds)
50	MF	JPN	Shota Kobayashi (from (Japan) Vegalta Sendai)
—	MF	JPN	Naoki Maeda (from (Japan) Fukushima United FC, end of loan)
—	FW	JPN	Hibiki Wada (from (Japan) Fukushima United FC, end of loan)

Out: Note: Flags indicate national team as defined under FIFA eligibility rules; some limited exceptions apply. Players may hold more than one non-FIFA nationality.

No.	Pos.	Nation	Player
3	DF	JPN	Ryohei Okazaki (to (Japan) FC Ryukyu)
4	DF	BRA	André Bahia (released)
5	MF	JPN	Yusuke Kobayashi (to (Japan) Kashiwa Reysol, end of loan)
9	FW	KOR	Lee Jeong-hyeop (to (South Korea) Busan IPark, end of loan)
11	MF	JPN	Ryo Takahashi (to (Japan) Matsumoto Yamaga)
14	MF	JPN	Seiya Fujita (to (Japan) Tokushima Vortis)
17	FW	JPN	Jin Hanato (on loan to (Japan) Tokyo Verdy)
23	FW	JPN	Kaoru Takayama (to (Japan) Oita Trinita)
28	DF	JPN	Hirokazu Ishihara (on loan to (Japan) Avispa Fukuoka)
30	DF	JPN	Tsuyoshi Shimamura (retired)
31	GK	JPN	Masaaki Goto (on loan to (Japan) Zweigen Kanazawa)
41	MF	CRO	Mihael Mikic (released)
50	FW	JPN	Keijiro Ogawa (to (Japan) Vissel Kobe, end of loan)
—	DF	JPN	Park Tae-hwan (to (South Korea) Cheonan City FC)
—	MF	JPN	Yuta Narawa (to (Japan) Tokyo Verdy, previously on loan)
—	MF	JPN	Yoshiki Ishikawa (to (Japan) Omiya Ardija, previously on loan)
—	MF	JPN	Naoki Maeda (to (Japan) Iwaki FC)
—	FW	JPN	Genta Omotehara (to (Japan) Tokushima Vortis, previously on loan)
—	FW	JPN	Tsuyoshi Miyaichi (to (Japan) Iwate Grulla Morioka, previously on loan)
—	FW	JPN	Hibiki Wada (on loan to (Japan) ReinMeer Aomori)

=== Sagan Tosu ===
In: Note: Flags indicate national team as defined under FIFA eligibility rules; some limited exceptions apply. Players may hold more than one non-FIFA nationality.

No.	Pos.	Nation	Player
1	GK	JPN	Takuo Okubo (from (Japan) FC Tokyo)
5	DF	CRO	Nino Galović (from (Belarus) Dinamo Minsk)
7	MF	ESP	Isaac Cuenca (from (Spain) Reus)
18	GK	JPN	Yohei Takaoka (from (Japan) Yokohama FC, previously on loan)
20	DF	CRO	Karlo Bručić (from (Israel) Ashdod)
21	GK	KOR	Kim Min-ho (from Seoul Boin High School)
22	MF	JPN	Teruki Hara (from (Japan) Albirex Niigata)
30	DF	JPN	Yuta Higuchi (from NIFS Kanoya)
33	FW	JPN	Kaisei Ishii (promoted from youth ranks)
40	GK	JPN	Yosei Itahashi (promoted from youth ranks)
41	MF	JPN	Daiki Matsuoka (promoted from youth ranks)
—	GK	JPN	Taku Akahoshi (from (Japan) Tokushima Vortis, end of loan)
—	MF	JPN	Koki Mizuno (from (Japan) Roasso Kumamoto, end of loan)

Out: Note: Flags indicate national team as defined under FIFA eligibility rules; some limited exceptions apply. Players may hold more than one non-FIFA nationality.

No.	Pos.	Nation	Player
5	DF	KOR	Kim Min-hyeok (to (South Korea) Jeonbuk Hyundai Motors)
7	MF	JPN	Hiroki Kawano (on loan to (Japan) Tokyo Verdy)
20	GK	JPN	Shuichi Gonda (to (Portugal) Portimonense)
21	MF	JPN	Kohei Kato (to (Poland) Widzew Łódź)
22	FW	JPN	Kei Ikeda (to (Malaysia) FELDA United FC)
23	DF	JPN	Yutaka Yoshida (to (Japan) Nagoya Grampus)
27	FW	JPN	Kyosuke Tagawa (to (Japan) FC Tokyo)
30	GK	JPN	Akira Fantini (released)
33	DF	LBN	Joan Oumari (to (United Arab Emirates) Al Nasr, end of loan)
38	DF	JPN	Daichi Inui (to (Japan) V-Varen Nagasaki, end of loan)
—	GK	JPN	Shugo Tsuji (to (Japan) Yokohama FC, previously on loan)
—	GK	JPN	Taku Akahoshi (released)
—	MF	JPN	Koki Mizuno (released)

=== Nagoya Grampus ===
In: Note: Flags indicate national team as defined under FIFA eligibility rules; some limited exceptions apply. Players may hold more than one non-FIFA nationality.

No.	Pos.	Nation	Player
2	MF	JPN	Takuji Yonemoto (from (Japan) FC Tokyo)
5	DF	JPN	Kazuhiko Chiba (from (Japan) Sanfrecce Hiroshima)
6	DF	JPN	Kazuya Miyahara (from (Japan) Sanfrecce Hiroshima, previously on loan)
8	MF	BRA	João Schmidt (from (Italy) Atalanta)
10	MF	BRA	Gabriel Xavier (from (Brazil) Cruzeiro, previously on loan)
11	MF	BRA	Mateus (from (Japan) Omiya Ardija)
15	MF	JPN	Hiroki Ito (on loan from (Japan) Jubilo Iwata)
23	DF	JPN	Yutaka Yoshida (from (Japan) Sagan Tosu)
26	MF	JPN	Koki Sugimori (from (Japan) Machida Zelvia, end of loan)
27	MF	JPN	Yuki Soma (from Waseda University)
30	MF	JPN	Shuto Watanabe (from Tokai Gakuen University)
32	FW	JPN	Shuhei Akasaki (on loan from (Japan) Kawasaki Frontale)
33	MF	JPN	Shumpei Naruse (promoted from youth ranks)
34	DF	JPN	Haruya Fujii (promoted from youth ranks)
—	DF	JPN	Kenta Uchida (from (Japan) Montedio Yamagata, end of loan)
—	FW	JPN	Daiki Watanabe (from Tokai Gakuen University)
—	FW	JPN	Kohei Matsumoto (from (Japan) SC Sagamihara, end of loan)

Out: Note: Flags indicate national team as defined under FIFA eligibility rules; some limited exceptions apply. Players may hold more than one non-FIFA nationality.

No.	Pos.	Nation	Player
1	GK	JPN	Seigo Narazaki (retired)
5	DF	JPN	Ikki Arai (on loan to (Japan) JEF United Chiba)
11	FW	JPN	Hisato Sato (to (Japan) JEF United Chiba)
21	MF	JPN	Kohei Hattanda (to (Japan) Oita Trinita)
28	FW	JPN	Keiji Tamada (to (Japan) V-Varen Nagasaki)
32	MF	JPN	Shumpei Fukahori (on loan to (Portugal) Vitória S.C.)
36	DF	BRA	Willian Rocha (to (Brazil) Guarani FC, end of loan)
—	FW	JPN	Jonathan Matsuoka (on loan to (Japan) SC Sagamihara)
—	DF	JPN	Hiroto Hatao (to (Japan) Omiya Ardija, previously on loan)
—	DF	JPN	Ryusuke Sakai (to (Japan) Machida Zelvia, previously on loan)
—	DF	JPN	Kenta Uchida (to (Japan) Ventforet Kofu)
—	MF	JPN	Kenta Kajiyama (to (Japan) SC Sagamihara, previously on loan)
—	FW	JPN	Kohei Matsumoto (on loan to (Japan) FC Maruyasu Okazaki)

=== Jubilo Iwata ===
In: Note: Flags indicate national team as defined under FIFA eligibility rules; some limited exceptions apply. Players may hold more than one non-FIFA nationality.

No.	Pos.	Nation	Player
11	FW	LUX	Gerson Rodrigues (from (Moldova) Sheriff Tiraspol)
17	MF	JPN	Kentaro Moriya (from (Japan) Kawasaki Frontale)
28	DF	JPN	Ryoma Ishida (from (Japan) Zweigen Kanazawa, end of loan)
32	FW	JPN	Masato Nakayama (from (Japan) Montedio Yamagata)

Out: Note: Flags indicate national team as defined under FIFA eligibility rules; some limited exceptions apply. Players may hold more than one non-FIFA nationality.

No.	Pos.	Nation	Player
11	MF	JPN	Takuya Matsuura (to (Japan) Yokohama FC)
38	MF	JPN	Hiroki Ito (on loan to (Japan) Nagoya Grampus)
—	GK	JPN	Ayumi Niekawa (to (Japan) Azul Claro Numazu, previously on loan)

=== Matsumoto Yamaga ===
In: Note: Flags indicate national team as defined under FIFA eligibility rules; some limited exceptions apply. Players may hold more than one non-FIFA nationality.

No.	Pos.	Nation	Player
10	FW	BRA	Leandro Pereira (from (Belgium) Club Brugge)
15	DF	BRA	Eduardo (from (Japan) Matsumoto Yamaga)
17	MF	JPN	Koki Tsukagawa (from (Japan) Fagiano Okayama)
20	MF	JPN	Taro Sugimoto (from (Japan) Kashima Antlers)
22	MF	JPN	Shusuke Yonehara (from (Japan) Roasso Kumamoto)
23	GK	JPN	Kengo Tanaka (from (Japan) Nagano Parceiro)
24	DF	JPN	Masahiro Nasukawa (from (Japan) Oita Trinita)
25	MF	JPN	Yamato Machida (from (Japan) JEF United Chiba)
27	FW	JPN	Itsuki Enomoto (from Maebashi Ikuei High School)
28	DF	JPN	Ryuhei Yamamoto (from Yokkaichi Chuo Kogyo High School)
30	DF	JPN	Yushi Mizobuchi (on loan from (Japan) JEF United Chiba)
33	DF	JPN	Yuya Ono (from Hannan University)
35	MF	JPN	Masaki Miyasaka (from (Japan) Oita Trinita, end of loan)
42	MF	JPN	Ryo Takahashi (from (Japan) Shonan Bellmare)
44	DF	JPN	Kohei Hattori (from (Japan) Tochigi SC)
—	GK	JPN	Kengo Nagai (from (Japan) Kataller Toyama, end of loan)
—	DF	JPN	Kenta Hoshihara (from (Japan) Thespakusatsu Gunma, end of loan)

Out: Note: Flags indicate national team as defined under FIFA eligibility rules; some limited exceptions apply. Players may hold more than one non-FIFA nationality.

No.	Pos.	Nation	Player
5	MF	JPN	Yudai Iwama (to (Japan) Tochigi SC)
11	FW	JPN	Kohei Mishima (to (Japan) Roasso Kumamoto)
18	MF	JPN	Takaaki Shichi (to (Japan) Mito HollyHock)
20	MF	JPN	Takayoshi Ishihara (to (Japan) Vegalta Sendai)
21	GK	JPN	Tomoyuki Suzuki (to (Japan) Tokyo Verdy)
23	MF	JPN	Tomotaka Okamoto (to (Japan) Roasso Kumamoto)
27	DF	SGP	Anders Aplin (to (Singapore) Geylang International, end of loan)
29	DF	JPN	Yota Shimokawa (on loan to (Japan) Ehime FC)
33	DF	JPN	Yu Yasukawa (released)
36	DF	JPN	Yuki Muto (retired)
37	MF	JPN	Mitsuo Yamada (on loan to (Japan) Azul Claro Numazu)
39	FW	JPN	Ren Komatsu (on loan to (Japan) Zweigen Kanazawa)
49	FW	BRA	Dinei (released)
—	GK	JPN	Kengo Nagai (on loan to (Japan) Tokushima Vortis)
—	DF	JPN	Kenta Hoshihara (to (Japan) Fujieda MYFC)
—	FW	PRK	Han Yong-thae (on loan to (Japan) Kagoshima United FC)

=== Oita Trinita ===
In: Note: Flags indicate national team as defined under FIFA eligibility rules; some limited exceptions apply. Players may hold more than one non-FIFA nationality.

No.	Pos.	Nation	Player
3	DF	JPN	Yuto Misao (from (Japan) Kashima Antlers)
4	MF	JPN	Toshio Shimakawa (from (Japan) Ventforet Kofu)
14	MF	JPN	Kazuki Kozuka (from (Japan) Ventforet Kofu)
21	GK	JPN	Ryosuke Kojima (from Waseda University)
23	FW	JPN	Kaoru Takayama (from (Japan) Shonan Bellmare)
25	MF	JPN	Seigo Kobayashi (from (Japan) Vissel Kobe)
28	MF	JPN	Daisuke Sakai (from (Japan) Albirex Niigata, end of loan)
30	FW	JPN	Tsubasa Yoshihira (from (Japan) Blaublitz Akita, end of loan)
31	GK	JPN	William Popp (on loan from (Japan) Kawasaki Frontale)
32	MF	JPN	Ryosuke Maeda (from (Japan) Vissel Kobe, previously on loan)
38	MF	JPN	Keita Takahata (promoted from youth ranks)
39	DF	JPN	Honoya Shoji (on loan from (Japan) Cerezo Osaka)
40	MF	JPN	Yushi Hasegawa (from Miyazaki Sangyo-keiei University)
44	MF	THA	Thitipan Puangchan (on loan from (Thailand) Bangkok Glass FC)
45	FW	JPN	Ado Onaiwu (on loan from (Japan) Urawa Red Diamonds)
46	MF	JPN	Ryotaro Ito (on loan from (Japan) Urawa Red Diamonds)

Out: Note: Flags indicate national team as defined under FIFA eligibility rules; some limited exceptions apply. Players may hold more than one non-FIFA nationality.

No.	Pos.	Nation	Player
1	GK	JPN	Tomohito Shugyo (to (Japan) FC Imabari)
2	DF	BRA	Willian Magrão (to (Japan) Kagoshima United FC)
3	DF	JPN	Masahiro Nasukawa (to (Japan) Matsumoto Yamaga)
8	MF	PRK	Hwang Song-su (to (Japan) Criacao Shinjuku)
11	FW	JPN	Yohei Hayashi (to (Japan) Blaublitz Akita)
14	DF	JPN	Shohei Kishida (to (Japan) Mito HollyHock)
17	MF	JPN	Shintaro Kokubu (on loan to (Japan) Giravanz Kitakyushu)
24	MF	JPN	Yuya Himeno (on loan to (Japan) Thespakusatsu Gunma)
35	MF	JPN	Masaki Miyasaka (to (Japan) Matsumoto Yamaga, end of loan)
48	FW	JPN	Shota Kawanishi (on loan to (Japan) FC Gifu)
50	DF	JPN	Shinji Yamaguchi (to (Japan) Vissel Kobe, end of loan)
—	MF	JPN	Takuya Nogami (on loan to (Japan) Vonds Ichihara)
—	DF	JPN	Koyo Sato (to (Japan) ReinMeer Aomori, previously on loan)
—	DF	JPN	Akira Takeuchi (to (Japan) Kamatamare Sanuki, previously on loan)
