= 2016 Nagoya Grampus season =

Nagoya Grampus
2016 season
- Chairman: Toyo Kato
- Manager: Takafumi Ogura (until 23 August); Boško Gjurovski (caretaker) (from 23 August)
- J.League: 16th (relegated)
- Emperor's Cup: Second Round vs Nagano Parceiro
- J.League Cup: Group Stage
- Top goalscorer: League: Robin Simović (11 goals); All: Robin Simović (11 goals)
Home colours	Away colours

The 2016 Nagoya Grampus season was Nagoya Grampus' 24th season in the J.League Division 1 and 34th overall in the Japanese top flight. Takafumi Ogura managed the team until 23 August, when he was replaced with Boško Gjurovski. Nagoya Grampus finished the season in 16th place, being relegated to J2 League for the first time in their history, whilst being knocked out of the Emperor's Cup at the Second Round stage by Nagano Parceiro and the failing to progress from their J.League Cup group.

== Squad ==
As of 12 September 2016

Note: Flags indicate national team as defined under FIFA eligibility rules; some limited exceptions apply. Players may hold more than one non-FIFA nationality.

No.	Pos.	Nation	Player
1	GK	JPN	Seigo Narazaki
2	DF	JPN	Akira Takeuchi
3	DF	SWE	Ludvig Öhman
4	DF	JPN	Tulio
5	DF	JPN	Shun Obu
6	DF	JPN	Shota Kobayashi
7	MF	JPN	Taishi Taguchi
8	MF	KOR	Ha Dae-sung (loan from FC Tokyo)
9	FW	SWE	Robin Simović
10	MF	JPN	Yoshizumi Ogawa
11	FW	JPN	Kensuke Nagai
13	MF	JPN	Ryota Isomura
14	MF	JPN	Ryota Tanabe
15	MF	KOR	Lee Seung-hee
16	GK	JPN	Yohei Takeda
17	MF	JPN	Tomokazu Myojin
18	FW	JPN	Ryunosuke Noda
19	FW	JPN	Kisho Yano
20	MF	JPN	Asahi Yada

No.	Pos.	Nation	Player
21	GK	JPN	Koji Nishimura
22	FW	JPN	Tomoya Koyamatsu
23	MF	JPN	Ryota Aoki
26	MF	JPN	Yuto Mori
24	DF	JPN	Ryo Takahashi
27	FW	JPN	Koki Sugimori
28	GK	JPN	Kota Ogi
29	MF	JPN	Ryuji Izumi
31	MF	JPN	Takahiro Ogihara
32	FW	JPN	Kengo Kawamata
33	DF	JPN	Michihiro Yasuda
34	FW	BRA	Gustavo
36	DF	JPN	Ryusuke Sakai
38	FW	JPN	Riki Matsuda
40	MF	JPN	Kanta Kajiyama
41	MF	JPN	Shoma Tanaka
42	FW	JPN	Shunpei Fukahori
43	DF	JPN	Yusuke Aoyama
44	DF	JPN	Genki Miyachi

== Transfers ==
=== Winter ===
In: Note: Flags indicate national team as defined under FIFA eligibility rules; some limited exceptions apply. Players may hold more than one non-FIFA nationality.

No.	Pos.	Nation	Player
3	DF	SWE	Ludvig Öhman (from (Sweden) Kalmar)
6	DF	JPN	Shota Kobayashi (from (Japan) Shonan Bellmare)
9	FW	SWE	Robin Simović (from (Sweden) Helsingborg)
15	MF	Korea	Lee Seung-hee (from (Thailand) Suphanburi)
16	GK	JPN	Yohei Takeda (from (Japan) Oita Trinita)
17	MF	JPN	Tomokazu Myojin (from (Japan) Gamba Osaka)
28	GK	JPN	Kota Ogi (from (Japan) Ventforet Kofu)
33	DF	JPN	Michihiro Yasuda (from (Japan) Vissel Kobe)
38	FW	JPN	Riki Matsuda (loan return from (Japan) JEF United)

Out: Note: Flags indicate national team as defined under FIFA eligibility rules; some limited exceptions apply. Players may hold more than one non-FIFA nationality.

No.	Pos.	Nation	Player
3	DF	JPN	Yusuke Muta (to (Japan) Kyoto Sanga)
4	DF	JPN	Tulio
6	DF	JPN	Yuki Honda (to (Japan) Kyoto Sanga)
8	MF	COL	Danilson Córdoba (to (Japan) Avispa Fukuoka)
18	FW	SLO	Milivoje Novaković (to (Slovenia) Maribor)
24	DF	JPN	Nikki Havenaar (to (Austria) SV Horn)
25	MF	JPN	Reo Mochizuki (loan to (Japan) Renofa Yamaguchi)
29	DF	JPN	Kazuki Sato
30	GK	JPN	Masataka Nomura
33	MF	BRA	Leandro Domingues (to (Brazil) Vitória)
35	MF	JPN	Teruki Tanaka
50	GK	JPN	Yoshinari Takagi (to (Japan) Gifu)

=== Summer ===
In: Note: Flags indicate national team as defined under FIFA eligibility rules; some limited exceptions apply. Players may hold more than one non-FIFA nationality.

No.	Pos.	Nation	Player
4	DF	JPN	Tulio
8	MF	KOR	Ha Dae-sung (loan from (Japan) Tokyo)
31	DF	JPN	Takahiro Ogihara (from (Japan) Cerezo Osaka)
36	DF	JPN	Ryusuke Sakai (from (Japan) Matsumoto Yamaga)

Out: Note: Flags indicate national team as defined under FIFA eligibility rules; some limited exceptions apply. Players may hold more than one non-FIFA nationality.

No.	Pos.	Nation	Player

== Competitions ==
=== J.League ===
==== First stage ====
===== Results summary =====
Overall								Home						Away					
Pld	W	D	L	GF	GA	GD	Pts	W	D	L	GF	GA	GD	W	D	L	GF	GA	GD
17	4	5	8	24	29	−5	17	3	2	4	12	12	0	1	3	4	12	17	−5

Last updated: 25 June 2016.
Source: see below

===== Results by round =====
Round	1	2	3	4	5	6	7	8	9	10	11	12	13	14	15	16	17
Ground	A	H	A	H	A	H	H	A	H	H	A	H	A	A	H	H	A
Result	W	D	L	W	L	L	W	L	W	L	D	L	L	D	D	L	D
Position	7	4	9	4	8	11	11	12	10	11	11	11	13	13	13	14	14

Updated to match(es) played on 25 June 2016. Source: See Below
A = Away; H = Home; W = Win; D = Draw; L = Loss

===== Results =====
27 February 2016 1	Júbilo Iwata	0–1	Nagoya Grampus	Iwata
14:00 JST (UTC+9)	Kawabe (yellow card) 88'	Report	Öhman (yellow card) 18'; Yano (yellow card) 24'; Simović 29'	Stadium: Yamaha Stadium; Attendance: 14,333; Referee: Itaru Hirose

6 March 2016 2	Nagoya Grampus	1–1	Sanfrecce Hiroshima	Toyota
15:00 JST (UTC+9)	Simović 17'; Lee (yellow card) 28'; Öhman (yellow card) 68'	Report	Satō 43'; Aoyama (yellow card) 60'; Chiba (yellow card) 65'	Stadium: Toyota Stadium; Attendance: 27,061; Referee: Koichiro Fukushima

12 March 2016 3	Kawasaki Frontale	3–2	Nagoya Grampus	Kawasaki
19:00 JST (UTC+9)	Elsinho 6'; Ōkubo 75'; Nakamura 84'	Report	Matsuda 26'; Nagai 63'; Lee (yellow card) 68'; Yasuda (yellow card) 71'	Stadium: Todoroki Athletics Stadium; Attendance: 16,513; Referee: Koji Murakami

19 March 2016 4	Nagoya Grampus	2–1	Vegalta Sendai	Nagoya
14:00 JST (UTC+9)	Kobayashi (yellow card) 31'; Simović 45+1'; Takeuchi (yellow card) 54'; Matsuda (yellow card) 58'; Yano 87'	Report	Watanabe (yellow card) 36'; Wilson (yellow card) 68'; Lopes 82'; Oiwa (yellow card) 88'	Stadium: Mizuho Athletic Stadium; Attendance: 9,232; Referee: Yudai Yamamoto

2 April 2016 5	Tokyo	3–2	Nagoya Grampus	Chōfu
16:00 JST (UTC+9)	Morishige 43' (pen.), 81' (red card) 86'; Kawano (yellow card) 45+2'; Hirayama 70'	Report	Takeuchi 17' (yellow card) 42'; Yasuda (yellow card) 45+2'; Nagai 76'	Stadium: Ajinomoto Stadium; Attendance: 20,249; Referee: Takuto Okabe

10 April 2016 6	Nagoya Grampus	1–2	Omiya Ardija	Nagoya
13:00 JST (UTC+9)	Simović 26' (pen.); Myojin (yellow card) 45+1'	Report	Ienaga (yellow card) 25'; Komoto 72'; Izumisawa 79'	Stadium: Mizuho Athletic Stadium; Attendance: 12,417; Referee: Yusuke Araki

16 April 2016 7	Avispa Fukuoka	Postponed	Nagoya Grampus	Fukuoka
13:00 JST (UTC+9)		[ Report]		Stadium: Level5 Stadium

24 April 2016 8	Nagoya Grampus	2–1	Albirex Niigata	Nagoya
13:00 JST (UTC+9)	Seung-hee (yellow card) 18'; Simović 25'; Nagai 62'	Report	Hayama 64'	Stadium: Mizuho Athletic Stadium; Attendance: 8,957; Referee: Minoru Tojo

29 April 2016 9	Urawa Red Diamonds	4–1	Nagoya Grampus	Saitama
14:00 JST (UTC+9)	Kashiwagi 25' (yellow card) 46'; Lee 56'; Koroki 62'; Muto 65'	Report	Simović 39'; Ogawa (yellow card) 53'	Stadium: Saitama Stadium 2002; Attendance: 42,547; Referee: Ryuji Sato

4 May 2016 10	Nagoya Grampus	3–1	Yokohama F. Marinos	Toyota
14:00 JST (UTC+9)	Simović 33'; Izumi 49'; Kawamata 78'	Report	Ito 70'	Stadium: Toyota Stadium; Attendance: 27,669; Referee: Mikiya Nishimura

8 May 2016 11	Nagoya Grampus	0–1	Vissel Kobe	Toyota
13:00 JST (UTC+9)	Nagai (yellow card) 68'	Report	Leandro 11'; Iwanami (yellow card) 67'	Stadium: Toyota Stadium; Attendance: 15,000; Referee: Hiroyuki Kimura

14 May 2016 12	Ventforet Kofu	2–2	Nagoya Grampus	Kōfu
18:30 JST (UTC+9)	Kumagai (yellow card) 21'; Tanaka 49'; Matsuhashi 68'	Report	Simović (yellow card) 14' (goal) 80'; Yano (yellow card) 59'; Kobayashi 90+2'	Stadium: Yamanashi Chuo Bank Stadium; Attendance: 10,184; Referee: Kazuyoshi Enomoto

21 May 2016 13	Nagoya Grampus	2–3	Kashima Antlers	Toyota
18:30 JST (UTC+9)	Taguchi 46'; Myojin (yellow card) 60'; Takeuchi 66'; Öhman (yellow card) 86'	Report	Akasaki (yellow card) 26'; Caio (yellow card) 42' (goal) 56', 90+2'; Suzuki 86'	Stadium: Toyota Stadium; Attendance: 17,499; Referee: Nobutsugu Murakami

29 May 2016 14	Shonan Bellmare	2–1	Nagoya Grampus	Hiratsuka
18:00 JST (UTC+9)	Bahia (yellow card) 16'; Kikuchi (yellow card) 38' (goal) 80'; Hanato 41'; Shimoda (yellow card) 90+2'	Report	Takeuchi (yellow card) 6'; Lee 56'; Yano (yellow card) 78'; Isomura (yellow card) 82'	Stadium: Shonan BMW Stadium Hiratsuka; Attendance: 10,147; Referee: Ryuji Sato

2 June 2016 7	Avispa Fukuoka	0–0	Nagoya Grampus	Fukuoka
19:00 JST (UTC+9)	Córdoba (yellow card) 53'	Report	Öhman (yellow card) 28'; Yasuda (yellow card) 59'; Kobayashi (yellow card) 62'	Stadium: Level5 Stadium; Attendance: 5,870; Referee: Yoshiro Imamura

11 June 2016 15	Nagoya Grampus	0–1	Sagan Tosu	Nagoya
19:00 JST (UTC+9)	Yano (yellow card) 27'	Report	Toyoda 6'; Yoshida (yellow card) 61'	Stadium: Mizuho Athletic Stadium; Attendance: 7,980; Referee: Masaaki Toma

18 June 2016 16	Nagoya Grampus	1–1	Kashiwa Reysol	Nagoya
19:00 JST (UTC+9)	Simović 53'	Report	Barada 68'	Stadium: Mizuho Athletic Stadium; Attendance: 10,517; Referee: Yudai Yamamoto

25 June 2016 17	Gamba Osaka	3–3	Nagoya Grampus	Suita
19:00 JST (UTC+9)	Abe 45'; Kim 54'; Konno 87'	Report	Kawamata 3', 67'; Yano (yellow card) 87' (goal) 89'	Stadium: Suita City Football Stadium; Attendance: 33,546; Referee: Hiroyoshi Takayama

===== League table =====
Pos	Team	Pld	W	D	L	GF	GA	GD	Pts
12	Vissel Kobe	17	5	5	7	23	25	−2	20
13	Albirex Niigata	17	4	6	7	19	25	−6	18
14	Nagoya Grampus	17	4	5	8	24	29	−5	17
15	Sagan Tosu	17	4	5	8	10	15	−5	17
16	Shonan Bellmare	17	4	4	9	18	27	−9	16

Source: 2016 MEIJI YASUDA J1 LEAGUE 1st Stage League table
Rules for classification: 1) Points; 2) Goal difference; 3) Goals scored.

==== Second stage ====
===== Results summary =====
Overall								Home						Away					
Pld	W	D	L	GF	GA	GD	Pts	W	D	L	GF	GA	GD	W	D	L	GF	GA	GD
17	3	4	10	13	28	−15	13	1	2	5	9	15	−6	2	2	5	4	13	−9

Last updated: 7 November 2016.
Source: See Below

===== Results by round =====
Round	1	2	3	4	5	6	7	8	9	10	11	12	13	14	15	16	17
Ground	A	H	A	A	H	A	A	H	A	H	A	H	A	H	H	A	H
Result	L	L	L	D	L	D	L	L	L	D	W	L	W	W	D	L	L
Position	13	16	18	17	18	18	18	18	18	18	16	17	16	15	14	14	15

Updated to match(es) played on 7 November 2016. Source: See Below
A = Away; H = Home; W = Win; D = Draw; L = Loss

===== Results =====
2 July 2016 1	Omiya Ardija	1–0	Nagoya Grampus	Saitama
19:00 JST (UTC+9)	Kikuchi (yellow card) 63'; Komoto 90+4'	Report	Isomura (yellow card) 28' (yellow-red card) 52'; Myojin (yellow card) 59'; Noda (yellow card) 62'	Stadium: NACK5 Stadium Omiya; Attendance: 10,742; Referee: Jumpei Iida

9 July 2016 2	Nagoya Grampus	0–3	Kawasaki Frontale	Nagoya
18:00 JST (UTC+9)	Yano (yellow card) 35'; Ha (yellow card) 45'; Lee (red card) 84'	Report	Kobayashi 36'; Ōkubo 53'; Nakamura 77'	Stadium: Mizuho Athletic Stadium; Attendance: 16,780; Referee: Kenji Ogiya

13 July 2016 3	Kashima Antlers	3–0	Nagoya Grampus	Kashima
19:00 JST (UTC+9)	Nakamura 6'; Yamamoto 26'; Suzuki 87'	Report		Stadium: Kashima Soccer Stadium; Attendance: 6,696; Referee: Yuichi Nishimura

17 July 2016 4	Sagan Tosu	0–0	Nagoya Grampus	Tosu
19:00 JST (UTC+9)	Taniguchi (yellow card) 67'	Report	Isomura (yellow card) 11'; Simović (yellow card) 90+1'	Stadium: Tosu Stadium; Attendance: 10,618; Referee: Shoichiro Mikami

23 July 2016 5	Nagoya Grampus	1–3	Ventforet Kofu	Nagoya
18:00 JST (UTC+9)	Kobayashi (yellow card) 18'; Lee (yellow card) 36'; Yano 62'	Report	Inagaki 11'; Yamamoto (yellow card) 66'; Dudu 75'; Tanaka 77'	Stadium: Mizuho Athletic Stadium; Attendance: 12,072; Referee: Koichiro Fukushima

30 July 2016 6	Yokohama F. Marinos	0–0	Nagoya Grampus	Yokohama
19:00 JST (UTC+9)		Report	Yano (yellow card) 86'; Myojin (yellow card) 90+1'	Stadium: International Stadium Yokohama; Attendance: 25,772; Referee: Hajime Matsuo

6 August 2016 7	Sanfrecce Hiroshima	2–0	Nagoya Grampus	Hiroshima
19:00 JST (UTC+9)	Utaka 2'; Miyayoshi 22'; Shimizu (yellow card) 84'	Report	Lee (yellow card) 90'	Stadium: Hiroshima Big Arch; Attendance: 12,911; Referee: Kazuyoshi Enomoto

13 August 2016 8	Nagoya Grampus	0–2	Urawa Red Diamonds	Toyota
18:00 JST (UTC+9)	Isomura (yellow card) 85'	Report	Muto 44'; Ljubijankić 87'	Stadium: Toyota Stadium; Attendance: 29,508; Referee: Kenji Ogiya

20 August 2016 9	Kashiwa Reysol	3–1	Nagoya Grampus	Kashiwa
19:00 JST (UTC+9)	Akino (yellow card) 11'; Ito 58'; Cristiano 70'; Oliveira 75'	Report	Kawamata 81'	Stadium: Hitachi Kashiwa Soccer Stadium; Attendance: 8,577; Referee: Yusuke Araki

27 August 2016 10	Nagoya Grampus	1–1	Tokyo	Toyota
18:00 JST (UTC+9)	Kawamata (yellow card) 30'; Noda 45'; Narazaki (yellow card) 60'; Lee (yellow card) 81'	Report	Nakajima 90+1'	Stadium: Toyota Stadium; Attendance: 14,379; Referee: Masuya Ueda

10 September 2016 11	Albirex Niigata	0–1	Nagoya Grampus	Niigata
19:00 JST (UTC+9)		Report	Kawamata 28'; Tulio (yellow card) 36'; Isomura (yellow card) 80'	Stadium: Denka Big Swan Stadium; Attendance: 23,068; Referee: Hajime Matsuo

17 September 2016 12	Nagoya Grampus	1–3	Gamba Osaka	Toyota
19:30 JST (UTC+9)	Nagai 41'	Report	Omori 27'; Ideguchi (yellow card) 31' (goal) 90+1'; Ademilson 65'	Stadium: Toyota Stadium; Attendance: 29,481; Referee: Toma Iemoto

25 September 2016 13	Vegalta Sendai	1–2	Nagoya Grampus	Sendai
14:00 JST (UTC+9)	Isomura 86' (o.g.)	Report	Ogawa 2'; Simović (yellow card) 47'; Taguchi 57'; Ha (yellow card) 68'; Yano (yellow card) 90'	Stadium: Yurtec Stadium Sendai; Attendance: 16,476; Referee: Yuichi Nishimura

1 October 2016 14	Nagoya Grampus	5–0	Avispa Fukuoka	Nagoya
14:00 JST (UTC+9)	Ha 18'; Nagai (yellow card) 35' (goal) 36', 47', 55'; Sakai 86'	Report		Stadium: Mizuho Athletic Stadium; Attendance: 14,088; Referee: Takuto Okabe

22 October 2016 16	Nagoya Grampus	1–1	Júbilo Iwata	Toyota
14:00 JST (UTC+9)	Simović 44' (pen.)	Report	Bothroyd 47'	Stadium: Toyota Stadium; Attendance: 30,282; Referee: Ryuji Sato

29 October 2016 17	Vissel Kobe	3–0	Nagoya Grampus	Kobe
14:00 JST (UTC+9)	Matsushita 15'; Nakasaka 37'; Masuyama 69'	Report	Lee (yellow card) 45+3'; Nagai (yellow card) 69'	Stadium: Noevir Stadium Kobe; Attendance: 23,313; Referee: Hajime Matsuo

3 November 2016 18	Nagoya Grampus	1–3	Shonan Bellmare	Nagoya
13:30 JST (UTC+9)	Simović 50' (pen.)	Report	Yamada 6', 60'; Takayama 37'; Misao (yellow card) 47'; Tsuboi (yellow card) 49'	Stadium: Mizuho Athletic Stadium; Attendance: 18,474; Referee: Nobutsugu Murakami

===== League table =====
Pos	Team	Pld	W	D	L	GF	GA	GD	Pts
13	Ventforet Kofu	17	4	4	9	14	27	−13	16
14	Júbilo Iwata	17	2	7	8	16	27	−11	13
15	Nagoya Grampus	17	3	4	10	14	29	−15	13
16	Albirex Niigata	17	4	0	13	14	24	−10	12
17	Shonan Bellmare	17	3	2	12	12	29	−17	11

Source: 2016 MEIJI YASUDA J1 LEAGUE 2nd Stage League table
Rules for classification: 1) Points; 2) Goal difference; 3) Goals scored.

==== Overall ====
Round	1	2	3	4	5	6	7	8	9	10	11	12	13	14	15	16	17	18	19	20	21	22	23	24	25	26	27	28	29	30	31	32	33	34
Ground	A	H	A	H	A	H	H	A	H	H	A	H	A	A	H	H	A	A	H	A	A	H	A	A	H	A	H	A	H	A	H	H	A	H
Result	W	D	L	W	L	L	W	L	W	L	D	L	L	D	L	D	D	L	L	L	D	L	D	L	L	L	D	W	L	W	W	D	L	L
Position	7	4	9	4	8	11	11	12	10	11	11	11	13	13	13	14	14	13	16	16	16	17	17	16	16	16	16	16	16	16	15	16	16	16

Updated to match(es) played on 7 November 2016. Source: See Below
A = Away; H = Home; W = Win; D = Draw; L = Loss

Pos	Team	Pld	W	D	L	GF	GA	GD	Pts	Qualification or relegation
14	Ventforet Kofu	34	7	10	17	32	58	−26	31	
15	Albirex Niigata	34	8	6	20	33	49	−16	30	
16	Nagoya Grampus (R)	34	7	9	18	38	58	−20	30	Relegation to 2017 J2 League
17	Shonan Bellmare (R)	34	7	6	21	30	56	−26	27	Relegation to 2017 J2 League
18	Avispa Fukuoka (R)	34	4	7	23	26	66	−40	19	Relegation to 2017 J2 League

Source: Meiji Yasuda J1 League
Rules for classification: 1) Points; 2) Goal difference; 3) Goals scored.
(R) Relegated

=== J.League Cup ===
==== Group stage ====
Pos	Team	Pld	W	D	L	GF	GA	GD	Pts
3	Ventforet Kofu	6	2	2	2	3	4	−1	8
4	Shonan Bellmare	6	2	1	3	4	6	−2	7
5	Júbilo Iwata	6	1	2	3	4	7	−3	5
6	Kashima Antlers	6	1	1	4	8	12	−4	4
7	Nagoya Grampus	6	1	1	4	4	10	−6	4

Updated to match(es) played on 5 June 2016. Source: 2016J.League Yamazaki Nabisco Cup Group Stage Group A League table and J. League Data
Rules for classification: 1) Points; 2) Goal difference; 3) Goals scored; 4) Head-to-head points; 5) Head-to-head goal difference; 6) Fair-play points; 7) Draw.

23 March 2016 1	Omiya Ardija	1–0	Nagoya Grampus	Ōmiya-ku
19:00 JST (UTC+9)	Esaka 39'; Kato (yellow card) 63'	Report	Takahashi (yellow card) 1'; Öhman (yellow card) 45+1'	Stadium: NACK5 Stadium Omiya; Attendance: 5,359; Referee: Kazuyoshi Enomoto

27 March 2016 2	Nagoya Grampus	0–1	Shonan Bellmare	Nagoya
14:00 JST (UTC+9)	Obu (yellow card) 81'	Report	Kikuchi (yellow card) 13'; Paulinho (yellow card) 43'; Shimamura 87'	Stadium: Mizuho Athletic Stadium; Attendance: 7,309; Referee: Masuya Ueda

6 April 2016 3	Nagoya Grampus	1–3	Kashima Antlers	Nagoya
19:00 JST (UTC+9)	Noda 38'; Yasuda (yellow card) 56'; Öhman (yellow card) 68' (yellow-red card) 83'	Report	Shoji (yellow card) 27' (goal) 71'; Doi (yellow card) 37'; Endo 52'; Caio 66' (yellow card) 69'; Nishi (yellow card) 87'	Stadium: Mizuho Athletic Stadium; Attendance: 6,134; Referee: Hiromichi Oka

20 April 2016 4	Nagoya Grampus	0–0	Ventforet Kofu	Nagoya
19:00 JST (UTC+9)	Koyamatsu (yellow card) 44'; Obu (yellow card) 60'	Report		Stadium: Mizuho Athletic Stadium; Attendance: 3,919; Referee: Nobutsugu Murakami

25 May 2016 5	Vissel Kobe	4–0	Nagoya Grampus	Kobe
19:00 JST (UTC+9)	Nakasaka 10'; Soma (yellow card) 11'; Watanabe 19'; Ishizu 88'; Takahashi 90+3'	Report	Mori (yellow card) 31'; Isomura (yellow card) 44'; Lee (yellow card) 56'	Stadium: Misaki Park Stadium; Attendance: 5,168; Referee: Hiroyoshi Takayama

5 June 2016 6	Júbilo Iwata	1–3	Nagoya Grampus	Iwata
14:00 JST (UTC+9)	Bothroyd 64'	Report	Koyamatsu 27'; Takeuchi 37'; Kawamata 40'; Yasuda (yellow card) 70'; Ogawa (yellow card) 90+2'	Stadium: Yamaha Stadium; Attendance: 8,792; Referee: Kenji Ogiya

=== Emperor's Cup ===
3 September 2016 Second Round	Nagoya Grampus	0–1	Nagano Parceiro	Nagoya
18:00 JST (UTC+9)		Report	Tada 90+4'	Stadium: Nagoya City Minato Soccer Stadium; Attendance: 3,785; Referee: Koichiro Fukushima

== Squad statistics ==
As of match played 3 November 2016

=== Appearances and goals ===
No.	Pos	Nat	Player	Total		J-League		J-League Cup		Emperor's Cup	
No.	Pos	Nat	Player	Apps	Goals	Apps	Goals	Apps	Goals	Apps	Goals
1	GK	(Japan) JPN	Seigo Narazaki	31	0	27	0	3	0	1	0
2	DF	(Japan) JPN	Akira Takeuchi	36	3	30	2	5	1	1	0
3	DF	(Sweden) SWE	Ludvig Öhman	13	0	9	0	4	0	0	0
4	DF	(Japan) JPN	Tulio	7	0	7	0	0	0	0	0
5	DF	(Japan) JPN	Shun Obu	26	0	18+2	0	3+2	0	1	0
6	DF	(Japan) JPN	Shota Kobayashi	34	1	20+8	1	5	0	1	0
7	MF	(Japan) JPN	Taishi Taguchi	31	2	26+1	2	2+1	0	1	0
8	MF	(South Korea) KOR	Ha Dae-sung	10	1	9	1	0	0	0+1	0
9	FW	(Sweden) SWE	Robin Simović	31	11	27+2	11	2	0	0	0
10	MF	(Japan) JPN	Yoshizumi Ogawa	27	1	13+7	1	4+2	0	1	0
11	FW	(Japan) JPN	Kensuke Nagai	34	7	30+1	7	2+1	0	0	0
13	MF	(Japan) JPN	Ryota Isomura	19	0	10+6	0	3	0	0	0
15	MF	(South Korea) KOR	Lee Seung-hee	32	1	29	1	1+1	0	0+1	0
16	GK	(Japan) JPN	Yohei Takeda	9	0	7	0	1+1	0	0	0
17	MF	(Japan) JPN	Tomokazu Myojin	18	0	9+6	0	3	0	0	0
18	FW	(Japan) JPN	Ryunosuke Noda	18	2	8+7	1	2	1	1	0
19	FW	(Japan) JPN	Kisho Yano	35	3	30+1	3	3	0	1	0
20	MF	(Japan) JPN	Asahi Yada	18	0	6+7	0	4+1	0	0	0
21	GK	(Japan) JPN	Koji Nishimura	1	0	0	0	1	0	0	0
22	FW	(Japan) JPN	Tomoya Koyamatsu	9	1	1+4	0	3+1	1	0	0
23	MF	(Japan) JPN	Ryota Aoki	1	0	0+1	0	0	0	0	0
24	DF	(Japan) JPN	Ryo Takahashi	16	0	10+3	0	2+1	0	0	0
26	MF	(Japan) JPN	Yuto Mori	2	0	0	0	2	0	0	0
27	FW	(Japan) JPN	Koki Sugimori	4	0	1	0	1+2	0	0	0
28	GK	(Japan) JPN	Kota Ogi	1	0	0	0	1	0	0	0
29	MF	(Japan) JPN	Ryuji Izumi	17	1	8+6	1	2	0	1	0
31	DF	(Japan) JPN	Takahiro Ogihara	3	0	2	0	0	0	1	0
32	FW	(Japan) JPN	Kengo Kawamata	24	6	5+12	5	3+3	1	0+1	0
33	DF	(Japan) JPN	Michihiro Yasuda	27	0	21+1	0	4	0	1	0
34	FW	(Brazil) BRA	Gustavo	4	0	0+2	0	0+2	0	0	0
36	DF	(Japan) JPN	Ryusuke Sakai	11	1	8+3	1	0	0	0	0
38	MF	(Japan) JPN	Riki Matsuda	14	1	3+11	1	0	0	0	0
Players who left Nagoya Grampus during the season:

=== Goal Scorers ===
Place	Position	Nation	Number	Name	J-League	J-League Cup	Emperor's Cup	Total
1	FW	(Sweden)	9	Robin Simović	11	0	0	11
2	FW	(Japan)	11	Kensuke Nagai	7	0	0	7
3	FW	(Japan)	32	Kengo Kawamata	5	1	0	6
4	FW	(Japan)	19	Kisho Yano	3	0	0	3
4	DF	(Japan)	2	Akira Takeuchi	2	1	0	3
6	MF	(Japan)	7	Taishi Taguchi	2	0	0	2
6	FW	(Japan)	18	Ryunosuke Noda	1	1	0	2
8	MF	(Japan)	38	Riki Matsuda	1	0	0	1
8	MF	(Japan)	29	Ryuji Izumi	1	0	0	1
8	DF	(Japan)	6	Shota Kobayashi	1	0	0	1
8	MF	(South Korea)	8	Ha Dae-sung	1	0	0	1
8	MF	(Japan)	10	Yoshizumi Ogawa	1	0	0	1
8	MF	(South Korea)	36	Ryusuke Sakai	1	0	0	1
8	DF	(Japan)	36	Ryusuke Sakai	1	0	0	1
8	FW	(Japan)	22	Tomoya Koyamatsu	0	1	0	1
				TOTALS	37	4	0	41

=== Disciplinary record ===
Number	Nation	Position	Name	J-League		J.League Cup		Emperor's Cup		Total	
Number	Nation	Position	Name	Yellow card	Red card	Yellow card	Red card	Yellow card	Red card	Yellow card	Red card
1	(Japan)	GK	Seigo Narazaki	1	0	0	0	0	0	1	0
2	(Japan)	DF	Akira Takeuchi	3	0	0	0	0	0	3	0
3	(Sweden)	DF	Ludvig Öhman	4	0	3	1	0	0	7	1
4	(Japan)	DF	Tulio	1	0	0	0	0	0	1	0
5	(Japan)	DF	Shun Obu	0	0	2	0	0	0	2	0
6	(Japan)	DF	Shota Kobayashi	3	0	0	0	0	0	3	0
8	(South Korea)	MF	Ha Dae-sung	2	0	0	0	0	0	2	0
9	(Sweden)	FW	Robin Simović	3	0	0	0	0	0	3	0
10	(Japan)	MF	Yoshizumi Ogawa	1	0	1	0	0	0	2	0
11	(Japan)	FW	Kensuke Nagai	3	0	0	0	0	0	3	0
13	(Japan)	MF	Ryota Isomura	6	1	1	0	0	0	7	1
15	(South Korea)	MF	Lee Seung-hee	7	1	1	0	0	0	8	1
17	(Japan)	MF	Tomokazu Myojin	4	0	0	0	0	0	4	0
18	(Japan)	FW	Ryunosuke Noda	1	0	0	0	0	0	1	0
19	(Japan)	FW	Kisho Yano	8	0	0	0	0	0	8	0
22	(Japan)	FW	Tomoya Koyamatsu	0	0	1	0	0	0	1	0
24	(Japan)	DF	Ryo Takahashi	1	0	0	0	0	0	1	0
26	(Japan)	MF	Yuto Mori	0	0	1	0	0	0	1	0
32	(Japan)	FW	Kengo Kawamata	1	0	0	0	0	0	1	0
33	(Japan)	DF	Michihiro Yasuda	3	0	2	0	0	0	5	0
38	(Japan)	MF	Riki Matsuda	1	0	0	0	0	0	1	0
			TOTALS	52	2	13	1	0	0	65	3
