= Kohei Kitagawa =

Japanese footballer

Kohei Kitagawa 北川 滉平
Personal information
- Full name: Kohei Kitagawa
- Date of birth: 29 April 1995 (age 31)
- Place of birth: Shizuoka, Japan
- Height: 1.70 m (5 ft 7 in)
- Position: Midfielder

Team information
- Current team: FC Basara Hyogo
- Number: 24

Youth career
- 2011–2013: Júbilo Iwata

College career
Years	Team	Apps	(Gls)
2014	Momoyama Gakuin University		

Senior career*
Years	Team	Apps	(Gls)
2015–2017	V-Varen Nagasaki	13	(1)
2017–2019	Fujieda MYFC	13	(1)
2020–2021	J.FC Miyazaki	20	(27)
2022–2025	Fukui United	33	(31)
2025–2026	Cento Cuore Harima		
2026–	FC Basara Hyogo		
- * Club domestic league appearances and goals as of 21 May 2025 (UTC)

Kohei Kitagawa (北川 滉平, Kitagawa Kōhei; born 29 April 1995) is a Japanese professional footballer who plays as a midfielder for FC Basara Hyogo.

== Career ==
After spending his youth career with both Júbilo Iwata and Momoyama Gakuin University, Kitagawa joined V-Varen Nagasaki of the J. League Division 2 in 2015. He made his professional debut for the club on 10 October 2015 against Ehime. He came on as a 67th-minute substitute for Hiroshi Azuma and earned a yellow card just three minutes in as V-Varen Nagasaki drew the match 0–0. Kitagawa then scored his first professional goal for V-Varen Nagasaki on 1 November against Omiya Ardija. However, his 72nd-minute goal only proved to be a consolation goal as Nagasaki fell 2–1.

== Career statistics ==
Updated to 23 February 2020.

Club	Season	League			Cup		Total	
Club	Season	Division	Apps	Goals	Apps	Goals	Apps	Goals
V-Varen Nagasaki	2015	J2 League	5	1	2	1	7	2
V-Varen Nagasaki	2016	J2 League	8	0	1	0	9	0
V-Varen Nagasaki	2017	J2 League	0	0	1	0	1	0
Fujieda MYFC	2017	J3 League	11	1	–		11	1
Fujieda MYFC	2018	J3 League	2	0	–		2	0
Fujieda MYFC	2019	J3 League	0	0	–		0	0
Career total			26	2	4	1	30	3
