= Seigo Kobayashi =

Japanese footballer

Seigo Kobayashi 小林 成豪
Personal information
- Full name: Seigo Kobayashi
- Date of birth: 8 January 1994 (age 32)
- Place of birth: Kobe, Japan
- Height: 1.76 m (5 ft 9 in)
- Position: Midfielder

Team information
- Current team: Renofa Yamaguchi FC
- Number: 28

Youth career
- Wakakusa SSC
- –2011: Vissel Kobe

College career
Years	Team	Apps	(Gls)
2012–2015	Kwansei Gakuin University		

Senior career*
Years	Team	Apps	(Gls)
2016–2017	Vissel Kobe	33	(2)
2018	→ Montedio Yamagata (loan)	34	(12)
2019–2022	Oita Trinita	46	(6)
2023–	Renofa Yamaguchi FC	88	(7)
- * Club domestic league appearances and goals as of 21 August 2026

Seigo Kobayashi (小林 成豪, Kobayashi Seigō; born 8 January 1994) is a Japanese professional footballer who plays for Renofa Yamaguchi FC, as a midfielder.

== Career ==
Kobayashi was part of Vissel Kobe's youth academy and after graduating Kwansei Gakuin University, joined their first team in 2016.

In December 2018, it was announced that Kobayashi had signed for newly promoted J1 League side Oita Trinita for the 2019 season.

== Personal life ==
His sister Rikako Kobayashi plays for the Japan national team.

== Career statistics ==
Updated to 25 February 2019.

Appearances and goals by club, season and competition
Club	Season	League			Emperor's Cup		J.League Cup		Total	
Club	Season	Division	Apps	Goals	Apps	Goals	Apps	Goals	Apps	Goals
Vissel Kobe	2016	J1 League	20	1	0	0	5	1	25	2
Vissel Kobe	2017	J1 League	13	1	1	0	4	2	18	3
Montedio Yamagata	2018	J2 League	34	12	3	1	—		37	13
Career total			67	14	4	1	9	3	80	18
