= Tetsushi Kondo =

Japanese footballer

Tetsushi Kondo 近藤 徹志
Personal information
- Full name: Tetsushi Kondo
- Date of birth: November 4, 1986 (age 40)
- Place of birth: Fukuoka, Fukuoka, Japan
- Height: 1.87 m (6 ft 1 1/2 in)
- Position: Defender

Youth career
- 2002–2004: Higashi Fukuoka High School

Senior career*
Years	Team	Apps	(Gls)
2005–2009	Urawa Reds	0	(0)
2007	→Ehime FC (loan)	40	(3)
2010–2017	Fagiano Okayama	108	(3)
2017	Kataller Toyama	4	(0)
Total		152	(6)
Medal record
Urawa Reds
Winner	J1 League	2006
Runner-up	J1 League	2005
Winner	Emperor's Cup	2005
Winner	Emperor's Cup	2006
- * Club domestic league appearances and goals

Tetsushi Kondo (近藤 徹志, Kondō Tetsushi; born November 4, 1986) is a former Japanese football player.

== Career statistics ==
Appearances and goals by club, season and competition
Club	Season	League			Emperor's Cup		J.League Cup		Total	
Club	Season	Division	Apps	Goals	Apps	Goals	Apps	Goals	Apps	Goals
Urawa Reds	2005	J1 League	0	0	0	0	1	0	1	0
Urawa Reds	2006	J1 League	0	0	0	0	0	0	0	0
Ehime FC	2007	J2 League	40	3	3	0	-		43	0
Urawa Reds	2008	J1 League	0	0	0	0	0	0	0	0
Urawa Reds	2009	J1 League	0	0	1	0	0	0	1	0
Fagiano Okayama	2010	J2 League	33	0	1	0	-		34	0
Fagiano Okayama	2011	J2 League	21	0	1	0	-		22	0
Fagiano Okayama	2012	J2 League	4	0	0	0	-		4	0
Fagiano Okayama	2013	J2 League	23	3	2	1	-		25	4
Fagiano Okayama	2014	J2 League	17	0	1	0	-		18	0
Fagiano Okayama	2015	J2 League	7	0	0	0	-		7	0
Fagiano Okayama	2016	J2 League	0	0	0	0	-		0	0
Fagiano Okayama	2017	J2 League	3	0	0	0	-		3	0
Kataller Toyama	2017	J3 League	4	0	0	0	-		4	0
Career total			152	6	9	1	1	0	162	7
