= Kenta Yamafuji =

Japanese footballer

Kenta Yamafuji 山藤健太
Personal information
- Full name: Kenta Yamafuji
- Date of birth: 14 November 1986 (age 39)
- Place of birth: Sagamihara, Japan
- Height: 1.72 m (5 ft 8 in)
- Position: Midfielder

Team information
- Current team: Honda FC
- Number: 8

Youth career
- 2005–2008: Heisei International University

Senior career*
Years	Team	Apps	(Gls)
2009–2011	Arte Takasaki	85	(7)
2012–2013	Sony Sendai FC	64	(1)
2014–2018	Zweigen Kanazawa	112	(6)
2017	→ Giravanz Kitakyushu (loan)	8	(1)
2019–	Honda FC	18	(0)
- * Club domestic league appearances and goals as of 1 January 2019

Kenta Yamafuji (山藤健太, Yamafuji Kenta; born 14 November 1986) is a Japanese footballer who plays for Honda FC.

== Club career ==
On 10 January 2019, Yamafuji joined Honda FC.

== Club statistics ==
Updated to 23 February 2020.

Club performance			League		Cup		Total	
Season	Club	League	Apps	Goals	Apps	Goals	Apps	Goals
Japan			League		Emperor's Cup		Total	
2009	Arte Takasaki	JFL	22	1	1	0	0	0
2010	Arte Takasaki	JFL	30	4	2	0	0	0
2011	Arte Takasaki	JFL	33	2	2	0	0	0
2012	Sony Sendai FC	JFL	31	1	2	0	0	0
2013	Sony Sendai FC	JFL	33	0	2	0	0	0
2014	Zweigen Kanazawa	J3 League	32	2	2	0	0	0
2015	Zweigen Kanazawa	J2 League	41	0	1	0	42	0
2016	Zweigen Kanazawa	J2 League	37	4	0	0	37	4
2017	Zweigen Kanazawa	J2 League	2	0	0	0	2	0
2017	Giravanz Kitakyushu	J3 League	8	1	–		8	1
2018	Zweigen Kanazawa	J2 League	0	0	0	0	0	0
2019	Honda FC	JFL	18	0	5	0	23	0
Career total			287	15	17	0	304	15
