= Masato Tokida =

Japanese footballer

Masato Tokida 常田 克人
Personal information
- Full name: Masato Tokida
- Date of birth: 27 November 1997 (age 28)
- Place of birth: Ōmiya, Saitama, Japan
- Height: 1.87 m (6 ft 2 in)
- Position: Centre-back

Team information
- Current team: SC Sagamihara
- Number: 13

Youth career
- 2013–2015: Aomori Yamada High School

Senior career*
Years	Team	Apps	(Gls)
2016–2020	Vegalta Sendai	11	(0)
2017	→ Oita Trinita (loan)	0	(0)
2020	→ Matsumoto Yamaga (loan)	31	(1)
2021–2024	Matsumoto Yamaga	126	(6)
2025–	SC Sagamihara	34	(3)
- * Club domestic league appearances and goals as of 17 August 2026

Masato Tokida (常田 克人, Tokida Masato; born November 27, 1997) is a Japanese football player who play as a Centre-back and currently play for J3 League club, SC Sagamihara.

== Career ==
Masato Tokida joined J1 League club Vegalta Sendai in 2016. On 15 March 2017, he debuted in J.League Cup (v FC Tokyo). In August at same year, Tokida moved to Oita Trinita on loan for mid season.

In 2020, Tokida joined to J2 club, Matsumoto Yamaga on loan. Tokida was announce official permanent transfer for 2021 season after loan at his club.

On 5 January 2025, Tokida announce official transfer to J3 club, SC Sagamihara for 2025 season.

== Career statistics ==
=== Club ===
As of the start for 2025 season.

Appearances and goals by club, season and competition
Club	Season	League			Emperor's Cup		J.League Cup		Total	
Club	Season	Division	Apps	Goals	Apps	Goals	Apps	Goals	Apps	Goals
Vegalta Sendai	2016	J1 League	0	0	0	0	0	0	0	0
Vegalta Sendai	2017	J1 League	0	0	0	0	1	0	1	0
Oita Trinita (loan)	2017	J2 League	0	0	–		–		0	0
Vegalta Sendai	2018	J1 League	3	0	1	0	7	0	11	0
Vegalta Sendai	2019	J1 League	8	0	2	0	4	0	14	0
Vegalta Sendai	2020	J1 League	0	0	0	0	1	0	1	0
Matsumoto Yamaga (loan)	2020	J2 League	31	1	0	0	0	0	31	1
Matsumoto Yamaga	2021	J2 League	30	1	1	0	0	0	31	1
Matsumoto Yamaga	2022	J3 League	30	4	1	0	0	0	31	4
Matsumoto Yamaga	2023	J3 League	38	0	0	0	0	0	38	0
Matsumoto Yamaga	2024	J3 League	28	1	0	0	2	0	30	1
SC Sagamihara	2025	J3 League	0	0	0	0	0	0	0	0
Career total			168	7	5	0	15	0	188	7
