= Lee Seung-hee =

South Korean footballer (born 1988)

Personal information
- Date of birth: 10 June 1988 (age 38)
- Place of birth: South Korea
- Height: 1.84 m (6 ft 1/2 in)
- Position: Centre midfielder

Youth career
- Hongik University

Senior career*
Years	Team	Apps	(Gls)
2010–2014	Jeonnam Dragons	116	(1)
2012	→ Jeju United (loan)	10	(0)
2015	Suphanburi	30	(1)
2016	Nagoya Grampus	29	(1)
2017	Pohang Steelers	13	(1)
2018	Al-Fujairah	1	(0)
- * Club domestic league appearances and goals as of 1 January 2018

- Lee Seung-hee
- Hangul: 이승희
- Hanja: 李承熙
- RR: I Seunghui
- MR: I Sŭnghŭi

Lee Seung-hee (Korean: 이승희; born 10 June 1988) is a South Korean footballer who played for Jeonnam Dragons.

== Career ==
Lee was released by Nagoya Grampus, along with 8 other players, on 10 November 2016 following the club's relegation to J2 League.
