= Yasumasa Kawasaki =

Japanese footballer

Yasumasa Kawasaki 川﨑 裕大
Personal information
- Full name: Yasumasa Kawasaki
- Date of birth: 20 August 1992 (age 34)
- Place of birth: Ayase, Kanagawa, Japan
- Height: 1.75 m (5 ft 9 in)
- Position: Defender

Youth career
- 2011–2014: Ryutsu Keizai University

Senior career*
Years	Team	Apps	(Gls)
2015–2017	Sanfrecce Hiroshima	0	(0)
2017	→ Yokohama FC (loan)	1	(0)
2018–2020	Yokohama FC	29	(1)
2020	→ Kataller Toyama (loan)	10	(0)
2021–2022	SC Sagamihara	31	(0)
Medal record
Sanfrecce Hiroshima
Winner	J1 League	2015
- * Club domestic league appearances and goals as of 28 December 2022, 8:28 (UTC)

Yasumasa Kawasaki (川﨑 裕大, Kawasaki Yasumasa; born August 20, 1992) is a Japanese former football player.

== Career ==
Yasumasa Kawasaki joined J1 League club Sanfrecce Hiroshima in 2015. On March 15, 2017, he debuted in J.League Cup (v Ventforet Kofu). In August, he moved to Yokohama FC.

On 16 January 2023, Kawasaki announcement officially retirement from football.

== Career statistics ==
Updated to 1 March 2019.

Appearances and goals by club, season and competition
Club	Season	League			Emperor's Cup		J.League Cup		Asia		Total	
Club	Season	Division	Apps	Goals	Apps	Goals	Apps	Goals	Apps	Goals	Apps	Goals
Sanfrecce Hiroshima	2015	J1 League	0	0	0	0	0	0	–		0	0
Sanfrecce Hiroshima	2016	J1 League	0	0	0	0	0	0	0	0	0	0
Sanfrecce Hiroshima	2017	J1 League	0	0	0	0	6	0	–		6	0
Yokohama FC	2017	J2 League	1	0	–		–		–		1	0
Yokohama FC	2018	J2 League	14	1	1	0	–		–		15	1
Career total			15	1	1	0	6	0	0	0	22	1

== Honours ==
- Sanfrecce Hiroshima: 2015 J1 League
