= Yuto Sashinami =

Japanese footballer

Yuto Sashinami 差波 優人
Personal information
- Full name: Yuto Sashinami
- Date of birth: June 28, 1993 (age 33)
- Place of birth: Aomori, Japan
- Height: 1.68 m (5 ft 6 in)
- Position: Midfielder

Team information
- Current team: Tokyo Musashino City
- Number: 23

Youth career
- 2009–2011: Aomori Yamada High School

College career
Years	Team	Apps	(Gls)
2012–2015	Meiji University		

Senior career*
Years	Team	Apps	(Gls)
2016–2018	Vegalta Sendai	1	(0)
2017	→ Grulla Morioka (loan)	15	(0)
2018	→ Kataller Toyama (loan)	31	(3)
2019	NK BSK Belica		
2019	Vanraure Hachinohe	14	(1)
2020–	Tokyo Musashino City	13	(1)
- * Club domestic league appearances and goals as of 12:07, 28 December 2020 (UTC)

Yuto Sashinami (差波 優人, Sashinami Yūto; born June 28, 1993) is a Japanese football player who plays for Tokyo Musashino City FC.

== Career ==
Yuto Sashinami joined J1 League club Vegalta Sendai in 2016. March 23, he debuted in J.League Cup (v Albirex Niigata).

In March 2019, Sashinami signed with Croatian club NK BSK Belica. On 31 January 2020, Tokyo Musashino City FC announced the signing of Sashinami.

== Career statistics ==
Updated to 22 February 2018.

Appearances and goals by club, season and competition
Club	Season	League			Emperor's Cup		J.League Cup		Total	
Club	Season	Division	Apps	Goals	Apps	Goals	Apps	Goals	Apps	Goals
Vegalta Sendai	2016	J1 League	0	0	0	0	3	0	3	0
Vegalta Sendai	2017	J1 League	0	0	0	0	0	0	0	0
Grulla Morioka	2017	J3 League	15	0	—		—		15	0
Career total			0	0	0	0	0	0	0	0
