= Ryusuke Sakai =

Japanese footballer (born 1988)

Ryusuke Sakai 酒井 隆介
Personal information
- Full name: Ryusuke Sakai
- Date of birth: September 7, 1988 (age 38)
- Place of birth: Moriyama, Shiga, Japan
- Height: 1.75 m (5 ft 9 in)
- Position: Defender

Youth career
- 2007–2010: Komazawa University

Senior career*
Years	Team	Apps	(Gls)
2011–2014	Kyoto Sanga FC	99	(4)
2015–2016	Matsumoto Yamaga FC	36	(2)
2016–2017	Nagoya Grampus	21	(3)
2018	→ FC Machida Zelvia (loan)	27	(1)
2019–2021	FC Machida Zelvia	0	(0)
Medal record
Kyoto Sanga FC
Runner-up	Emperor's Cup	2011
- * Club domestic league appearances and goals as of 30 December 2018

Ryusuke Sakai (酒井 隆介, born September 7, 1988) is a Japanese football player, who features for FC Machida Zelvia.

== Career ==
=== Club ===
On 24 December 2018, Sakai moved permanently to Machida Zelvia following a loan deal the previous season.

== Career statistics ==
Updated to end of 2018 season.

Appearances and goals by club, season and competition
Club	Season	League			Emperor's Cup		J.League Cup		Total	
Club	Season	Division	Apps	Goals	Apps	Goals	Apps	Goals	Apps	Goals
Kyoto Sanga FC	2011	J2 League	28	0	2	0	—		30	0
Kyoto Sanga FC	2012	J2 League	7	0	2	0	—		9	0
Kyoto Sanga FC	2013	J2 League	23	2	1	0	—		24	2
Kyoto Sanga FC	2014	J2 League	41	2	1	0	—		42	2
Matsumoto Yamaga FC	2015	J1 League	33	2	4	0	2	0	39	2
Matsumoto Yamaga FC	2016	J2 League	3	0	—		—		3	0
Nagoya Grampus	2016	J1 League	11	2	0	0	—		11	2
Nagoya Grampus	2017	J2 League	10	1	2	0	—		12	1
FC Machida Zelvia	2018	J2 League	27	1	0	0	—		27	1
Career total			173	9	12	0	2	0	187	9
