= Takuya Nogami =

Japanese footballer

Takuya Nogami 野上 拓哉
Personal information
- Full name: Takuya Nogami
- Date of birth: November 29, 1998 (age 27)
- Place of birth: Oita, Japan
- Height: 1.75 m (5 ft 9 in)
- Position: Midfielder

Team information
- Current team: Vonds Ichihara (on loan from Oita Trinita)

Youth career
- Oita Trinita Youth

Senior career*
Years	Team	Apps	(Gls)
2017–	Oita Trinita	0	(0)
2017–2018	→ Verspah Oita (loan)	17	(2)
2019–	→ Vonds Ichihara (loan)		
- * Club domestic league appearances and goals as of 22 February 2018

Takuya Nogami (野上 拓哉, Nogami Takuya; born November 29, 1998) is a Japanese football player. He plays for Vonds Ichihara on loan from Verspah Oita.

== Career ==
Takuya Nogami joined J2 League club Oita Trinita in 2017. On June 21, he debuted in Emperor's Cup (v FC Machida Zelvia). In July, he moved to Verspah Oita and the loan was extended for 2018 season.

== Club statistics ==
Updated to 22 February 2018.

Club performance			League		Cup		Total	
Season	Club	League	Apps	Goals	Apps	Goals	Apps	Goals
Japan			League		Emperor's Cup		Total	
2017	Oita Trinita	J2 League	0	0	1	0	1	0
2017	Verspah Oita	JFL	13	2	-		13	2
Total			13	2	1	0	14	2
