= Akira Takeuchi (footballer) =

Japanese footballer

Akira Takeuchi 竹内 彬
Personal information
- Full name: Akira Takeuchi
- Date of birth: 18 June 1983 (age 43)
- Place of birth: Yokohama, Japan
- Height: 1.80 m (5 ft 11 in)
- Position: Centre-back

Team information
- Current team: Kamatamare Sanuki
- Number: 30

Youth career
- 2002–2005: Kokushikan University

Senior career*
Years	Team	Apps	(Gls)
2006–2010	Nagoya Grampus	63	(0)
2011–2014	JEF United Chiba	124	(11)
2015–2016	Nagoya Grampus	63	(2)
2017–2018	Oita Trinita	43	(1)
2018–2021	Kamatamare Sanuki	22	(1)
Medal record
Nagoya Grampus
Winner	J1 League	2010
Runner-up	Emperor's Cup	2009
- * Club domestic league appearances and goals as of 17:10, 17 May 2019 (UTC)

Akira Takeuchi (竹内 彬, Takeuchi Akira; born 18 June 1983 in Kanagawa) is a former Japanese football player.

== Club career statistics ==
Updated to 23 February 2018.

Club	Season	League		Emperor's Cup		J. League Cup		Continental		Total	
Club	Season	Apps	Goals	Apps	Goals	Apps	Goals	Apps	Goals	Apps	Goals
Kokushikan University	2002	4	0			–		–		4	0
Kokushikan University	2003	4	0			–		–		4	0
Kokushikan University	2004	5	0			–		–		5	0
Nagoya Grampus	2006	0	0	0	0	1	0	–		1	0
Nagoya Grampus	2007	13	0	0	0	4	0	–		17	0
Nagoya Grampus	2008	31	0	3	0	8	0	–		42	0
Nagoya Grampus	2009	13	0	1	0	1	0	6	0	21	0
Nagoya Grampus	2010	6	0	3	0	2	0	–		6	0
JEF United Chiba	2011	36	7	2	0	–		–		38	7
JEF United Chiba	2012	42	2	0	0	–		–		42	2
JEF United Chiba	2013	36	2	0	0	–		–		36	2
JEF United Chiba	2014	8	0	1	1	–		–		8	0
Nagoya Grampus	2015	33	0	1	0	7	0	–		41	0
Nagoya Grampus	2016	30	2	1	0	5	1	–		36	3
Oita Trinita	2017	39	1	0	0	–		–		39	1
Oita Trinita	2018					–					
Total		300	14	12	1	28	1	6	0	346	16
