= Ryo Takahashi (footballer, born 1993) =

Japanese footballer

Ryo Takahashi 高橋 諒
Personal information
- Full name: Ryo Takahashi
- Date of birth: 16 July 1993 (age 33)
- Place of birth: Gunma, Japan
- Height: 1.71 m (5 ft 7 in)
- Positions: Left winger; left back

Team information
- Current team: Fagiano Okayama
- Number: 42

Youth career
- –2005: Toho SC
- 2006–2008: Kunimi Junior High School
- 2009–2011: Kunimi High School

College career
Years	Team	Apps	(Gls)
2012–2015	Meiji University		

Senior career*
Years	Team	Apps	(Gls)
2016–2017	Nagoya Grampus	12	(0)
2017	→ Shonan Bellmare (loan)	6	(1)
2018	Shonan Bellmare	10	(1)
2019–2020	Matsumoto Yamaga	51	(2)
2021–2023	Shonan Bellmare	43	(2)
2023–2024	Fagiano Okayama	33	(1)
Total		155	(7)
Medal record
Shonan Bellmare
Winner	J.League Cup	2018
- * Club domestic league appearances and goals

Ryo Takahashi (高橋 諒, Takahashi Ryō; born 16 July 1993) is a Japanese former footballer who played as a left winger or a left back.

== Career statistics ==
Appearances and goals by club, season and competition
Club	Season	League			National cup (Note: Includes Emperors Cup)		League cup (Note: Includes J.League Cup)		Total	
Club	Season	Division	Apps	Goals	Apps	Goals	Apps	Goals	Apps	Goals
Meiji University	2014	–			1	0	–		1	0
Nagoya Grampus	2016	J1 League	12	0	0	0	3	0	15	0
Nagoya Grampus	2017	J1 League	0	0	0	0	0	0	0	0
Nagoya Grampus	Total		12	0	0	0	3	0	15	0
Shonan Bellmare (loan)	2017	J2 League	6	1	0	0	0	0	6	1
Shonan Bellmare	2018	J1 League	10	1	1	0	3	0	14	1
Matsumoto Yamaga	2019	J1 League	32	1	–		0	0	32	1
Matsumoto Yamaga	2020	J2 League	19	1	–		1	0	20	1
Matsumoto Yamaga	Total		51	2	0	0	1	0	52	2
Shonan Bellmare	2021	J1 League	30	2	2	0	1	0	33	2
Shonan Bellmare	2022	J1 League	13	0	2	0	6	0	21	0
Shonan Bellmare	Total		43	2	4	0	7	0	54	2
Fagiano Okayama	2023	J2 League	23	1	2	0	0	0	25	1
Fagiano Okayama	2024	J2 League	10	0	1	0	1	0	12	0
Fagiano Okayama	Total		33	1	3	0	1	0	37	1
Career total			155	7	9	0	15	0	179	7
