= 2017 Nagoya Grampus season =

Nagoya Grampus
2017 season
- Chairman: Toyo Kato
- Manager: Yahiro Kazama
- J2. League: 3rd
- J1. Playoffs: Promoted vs Avispa Fukuoka
- Emperor's Cup: Fourth Round vs Cerezo Osaka
- Top goalscorer: League: Robin Simović (18 goals); All: Robin Simović (21 goals)
Home colours	Away colours

The 2017 Nagoya Grampus season was Nagoya Grampus' first season in the J2 League following their relegation at the end of the 2016 season.

== Season events ==
Yahiro Kazama was appointed as the club's new manager on 4 January 2017.

== Squad ==
As of 26 November 2017

No.	Name	Nationality	Position	Date of birth (age)	Signed from	Signed in	Contract ends	Apps.	Goals
Goalkeepers
1	Seigo Narazaki	(Japan)	GK	15 April 1976 (aged 41)	Yokohama Flügels	1999		660	0
16	Yohei Takeda	(Japan)	GK	30 June 1987 (aged 30)	Oita Trinita	2016		21	0
18	Tsubasa Shibuya	(Japan)	GK	27 January 1995 (aged 22)	Yokohama	2017		6	0
22	Kota Ogi	(Japan)	GK	5 May 1983 (aged 34)	Ventforet Kofu	2016		1	0
Defenders
2	Ikki Arai	(Japan)	DF	8 November 1993 (aged 24)	loan from Yokohama F. Marinos	2017		6	1
3	Kazuki Kushibiki	(Japan)	DF	12 February 1993 (aged 24)	loan from Consadole Sapporo	2017		39	1
36	Ryusuke Sakai	(Japan)	DF	7 September 1988 (aged 29)	Matsumoto Yamaga	2016		23	2
39	Kenta Uchida	(Japan)	DF	2 October 1989 (aged 28)	Ehime	2017		21	2
Midfielders
7	Taishi Taguchi	(Japan)	MF	16 March 1991 (aged 26)	Albirex Niigata	2009		196	17
8	Washington	(Brazil)	MF	16 November 1986 (aged 31)	Brasil de Pelotas	2017		33	2
15	Kazuya Miyahara	(Japan)	MF	22 March 1996 (aged 21)	loan from Sanfrecce Hiroshima	2017		45	0
17	Yuki Kobayashi	(Japan)	MF	18 October 1988 (aged 29)	Albirex Niigata	2017		30	1
21	Kohei Hattanda	(Japan)	MF	8 January 1990 (aged 27)	Shimizu S-Pulse	2017		16	0
23	Ryota Aoki	(Japan)	MF	6 March 1996 (aged 21)	Academy	2014		36	13
25	Ryuji Sugimoto	(Japan)	MF	1 June 1993 (aged 24)	Tokyo Verdy	2017		18	2
29	Ryuji Izumi	(Japan)	MF	6 November 1993 (aged 24)	Meiji University	2016		60	2
32	Shunpei Fukahori	(Japan)	MF	29 June 1998 (aged 19)	Academy	2016		2	0
33	Kanta Kajiyama	(Japan)	MF	24 April 1998 (aged 19)	Academy	2016		0	0
40	Yosuke Akiyama	(Japan)	MF	13 April 1995 (aged 22)	Academy	2017		9	1
44	Gabriel Xavier	(Brazil)	MF	15 July 1993 (aged 24)	loan from Cruzeiro	2017		18	7
Forwards
9	Robin Simović	(Sweden)	FW	29 May 1991 (aged 26)	Helsingborgs IF	2016		76	32
10	Felipe Garcia	(Brazil)	FW	6 November 1990 (aged 27)	Brasil de Pelotas	2017		20	4
11	Hisato Satō	(Japan)	FW	12 March 1982 (aged 35)	Sanfrecce Hiroshima	2017		33	6
19	Yuki Oshitani	(Japan)	FW	23 September 1989 (aged 28)	Fagiano Okayama	2017		18	2
27	Koki Sugimori	(Japan)	FW	5 April 1997 (aged 20)	Academy	2014		41	3
28	Keiji Tamada	(Japan)	FW	11 April 1980 (aged 37)	Cerezo Osaka	2017		322	86
30	Kohei Matsumoto	(Japan)	FW	31 July 1994 (aged 23)	Academy	2017		0	0
37	Lim Seung-gyeom	(South Korea)	FW	26 April 1995 (aged 22)		2017		14	1
38	Ryo Nagai	(Japan)	FW	23 May 1991 (aged 26)	V-Varen Nagasaki	2017		26	7
Away on loan
14	Ryota Tanabe	(Japan)	MF	10 April 1993 (aged 24)	Academy	2017		42	3
24	Ryo Takahashi	(Japan)	DF	16 July 1993 (aged 24)	Meiji University	2016		16	0

=== Out on loan ===
Note: Flags indicate national team as defined under FIFA eligibility rules; some limited exceptions apply. Players may hold more than one non-FIFA nationality.

No.	Pos.	Nation	Player
14	MF	JPN	Ryota Tanabe (at Roasso Kumamoto)
24	DF	JPN	Ryo Takahashi (at Shonan Bellmare)

== Transfers ==
=== Winter ===
In: Note: Flags indicate national team as defined under FIFA eligibility rules; some limited exceptions apply. Players may hold more than one non-FIFA nationality.

No.	Pos.	Nation	Player
3	DF	JPN	Kazuki Kushibiki (loan from (Japan) Consadole Sapporo)
4	DF	BRA	Charles (from (Brazil) Ceará)
8	MF	BRA	Washington (from (Brazil) Brasil de Pelotas)
10	FW	BRA	Felipe Garcia (from (Brazil) Brasil de Pelotas)
11	FW	JPN	Hisato Satō (from (Japan) Sanfrecce Hiroshima)
15	MF	JPN	Kazuya Miyahara (loan from (Japan) Sanfrecce Hiroshima)
17	MF	JPN	Yuki Kobayashi (from (Japan) Albirex Niigata)
18	GK	JPN	Tsubasa Shibuya (from (Japan) Yokohama)
19	FW	JPN	Yuki Oshitani (from (Japan) Fagiano Okayama)
21	MF	JPN	Kohei Hattanda (from (Japan) Shimizu S-Pulse)
25	MF	JPN	Ryuji Sugimoto (from (Japan) Tokyo Verdy)
28	FW	JPN	Keiji Tamada (from (Japan) Cerezo Osaka)
38	FW	JPN	Ryo Nagai (from (Japan) V-Varen Nagasaki)
39	MF	JPN	Kenta Uchida (from (Japan) Ehime)

Out: Note: Flags indicate national team as defined under FIFA eligibility rules; some limited exceptions apply. Players may hold more than one non-FIFA nationality.

No.	Pos.	Nation	Player
2	DF	JPN	Akira Takeuchi (to (Japan) Oita Trinita)
3	DF	SWE	Ludvig Öhman (to (Sweden) Eskilstuna)
4	DF	JPN	Tulio (to (Japan) Kyoto Sanga)
8	MF	KOR	Ha Dae-sung (loan return to (Japan) FC Tokyo)
10	MF	JPN	Yoshizumi Ogawa (to (Japan) Sagan Tosu)
11	FW	JPN	Kensuke Nagai (to (Japan) Tokyo)
15	MF	KOR	Lee Seung-hee (to (South Korea) Pohang Steelers)
17	MF	JPN	Tomokazu Myojin (to (Japan) AC Nagano Parceiro)
18	FW	JPN	Ryunosuke Noda (to (Japan) Shonan Bellmare)
19	FW	JPN	Kisho Yano (to (Japan) Albirex Niigata)
21	GK	JPN	Koji Nishimura (Retired)
22	FW	JPN	Tomoya Koyamatsu (to (Japan) Kyoto Sanga)
26	MF	JPN	Yuto Mori (to (Japan) Gamba Osaka)
31	MF	JPN	Takahiro Ogihara (to (Japan) Yokohama F. Marinos)
32	FW	JPN	Kengo Kawamata (to (Japan) Júbilo Iwata)
34	FW	BRA	Gustavo (to (Japan) Roasso Kumamoto)
38	MF	JPN	Riki Matsuda (to (Japan) Avispa Fukuoka)
—	GK	JPN	Masataka Nomura (to (Japan) Roasso Kumamoto, previously on loan to (Japan) Blaublitz Akita)
—	MF	JPN	Reo Mochizuki (to (Japan) Kyoto Sanga, previously on loan to (Japan) Renofa Yamaguchi)

=== Summer ===
In: Note: Flags indicate national team as defined under FIFA eligibility rules; some limited exceptions apply. Players may hold more than one non-FIFA nationality.

No.	Pos.	Nation	Player
2	DF	JPN	Ikki Arai (loan from (Japan) Yokohama F. Marinos)
44	MF	BRA	Gabriel Xavier (loan from (Brazil) Cruzeiro)

Out: Note: Flags indicate national team as defined under FIFA eligibility rules; some limited exceptions apply. Players may hold more than one non-FIFA nationality.

No.	Pos.	Nation	Player
4	DF	BRA	Charles (to (Brazil) Joinville)
5	DF	JPN	Shun Obu (to (Japan) Albirex Niigata)
6	DF	JPN	Shota Kobayashi (loan to (Japan) Vegalta Sendai)
13	MF	JPN	Ryota Isomura (to (Japan) Albirex Niigata)
14	MF	JPN	Ryota Tanabe (loan to (Japan) Roasso Kumamoto)
20	MF	JPN	Asahi Yada (loan to (Japan) JEF United Chiba)
24	DF	JPN	Ryo Takahashi (loan to (Japan) Shonan Bellmare)
26	DF	JPN	Genki Miyachi (to (Japan) Matsumoto Yamaga)

== Competitions ==
=== J2. League ===
==== League table ====
Pos	Team	Pld	W	D	L	GF	GA	GD	Pts	Promotion, qualification or relegation
2	V-Varen Nagasaki (P)	42	24	8	10	59	41	+18	80	Promotion to 2018 J1 League
3	Nagoya Grampus (O, P)	42	23	6	13	85	65	+20	75	Qualification for promotion playoffs (Note: Only teams that meet J1 license criteria can participate in promotion playoffs. If one or more teams fail to meet the criteria, only eligible teams that finished 3rd to 6th will participate and no replacement teams will be added.)
4	Avispa Fukuoka	42	21	11	10	54	36	+18	74	Qualification for promotion playoffs

Updated to match(es) played on 28 November 2017. Source: 2017 MEIJI YASUDA J2 LEAGUE League table
Rules for classification: 1) Points; 2) Goal difference; 3) Goals scored
(O) Play-off winners; (P) Promoted

==== Results summary ====
Overall								Home						Away					
Pld	W	D	L	GF	GA	GD	Pts	W	D	L	GF	GA	GD	W	D	L	GF	GA	GD
42	23	6	13	85	65	+20	75	13	2	6	48	32	+16	10	4	7	37	33	+4

Last updated: 19 November 2017.
Source: see below

==== Results by round ====
Round	1	2	3	4	5	6	7	8	9	10	11	12	13	14	15	16	17	18	19	20	21	22	23	24	25	26	27	28	29	30	31	32	33	34	35	36	37	38	39	40	41	42
Ground	H	H	A	H	A	H	H	A	H	A	H	A	A	H	A	A	H	A	A	H	A	H	H	A	A	H	H	A	H	H	A	H	A	H	A	A	H	A	H	A	H	A
Result	W	D	L	W	W	W	W	D	L	W	D	D	L	W	W	W	L	L	L	W	L	L	W	L	W	W	W	W	W	L	D	L	L	W	W	W	W	D	W	W	L	W
Position	2	3	12	9	6	3	1	1	2	2	3	3	6	5	4	1	3	4	8	5	6	7	5	6	6	5	3	3	3	3	3	4	6	5	4	4	4	4	4	4	4	3

Updated to match(es) played on 19 November 2017. Source: See Below
A = Away; H = Home; W = Win; D = Draw; L = Loss

==== Results ====
26 February 2017 1	Nagoya Grampus	2–0	Fagiano Okayama	Nagoya
14:00 JST (UTC+9)	Nagai 42', 84'; Simović (yellow card) 56'; Izumi (yellow card) 73'	Report		Stadium: Paloma Mizuho Stadium; Attendance: 18,918; Referee: Itaru Hirose

4 March 2017 2	Nagoya Grampus	1–1	Gifu	Nagoya
14:00 JST (UTC+9)	Uchida 89'	Report	Tanaka 79'	Stadium: Paloma Mizuho Stadium; Attendance: 21,878; Referee: Tomohiro Inoue

11 March 2017 3	JEF United Chiba	2–0	Nagoya Grampus	Chiba
14:00 JST (UTC+9)	Tatara (yellow card) 30'; Nishino 44' (yellow card) 87'; Hanyu (yellow card) 69'; Lee (yellow card) 83'; Kiyotake 90+3'	Report		Stadium: Fukuda Denshi Arena; Attendance: 13,877; Referee: Yuichi Nishimura

18 March 2017 4	Nagoya Grampus	2–1	Mito HollyHock	Nagoya
14:00 JST (UTC+9)	Imase 28' (o.g.); Simović 34'; Miyahara (yellow card) 88'	Report	Fukui (yellow card) 7'; Tamukai (yellow card) 38'; Hayashi 50'; Uchida (yellow card) 62'	Stadium: Paloma Mizuho Stadium; Attendance: 9,320; Referee: Yudai Yamamoto

26 March 2017 5	Matsumoto Yamaga	1–2	Nagoya Grampus	Matsumoto
14:00 JST (UTC+9)	Takasaki 15' (pen.); Iwama (yellow card) 29'	Report	Uchida (yellow card) 14'; Iwama 47', 88' (o.g.)	Stadium: Matsumotodaira Football Stadium; Attendance: 15,509; Referee: Hajime Matsuo

1 April 2017 6	Nagoya Grampus	5–1	Roasso Kumamoto	Toyota
17:00 JST (UTC+9)	Satō 9'; Nagai 16'; Simović 37'; Sugimoto (yellow card) 54'; Washington (yellow card) 55'; Garcia 68', 79'	Report	Saito 65'	Stadium: Toyota Stadium; Attendance: 11,554; Referee: Hayato Shimizu

8 April 2017 7	Nagoya Grampus	2–1	Kamatamare Sanuki	Nagoya
14:00 JST (UTC+9)	Garcia (yellow card) 37'; Washington (yellow card) 45'; Tamada 59' (yellow card) 88'; Sugimoto 88'	Report	Hara (yellow card) 11'; Evson (yellow card) 39'; Ichimura (yellow card) 48'; Nishi 69'	Stadium: Paloma Mizuho Stadium; Attendance: 7,046; Referee: Hirokazu Otsubo

15 April 2017 8	Tokushima Vortis	2–2	Nagoya Grampus	Naruto
14:00 JST (UTC+9)	Mawatari 59'; Paraíba (yellow card) 72'; Watari 84' (yellow card) 85'	Report	Garcia 61'; Nagai 78'; Taguchi (yellow card) 84'; Uchida (yellow card) 90+3'	Stadium: Pocarisweat Stadium; Attendance: 6,078; Referee: Nobutsugu Murakami

22 April 2017 9	Nagoya Grampus	0–2	Renofa Yamaguchi	Nagoya
14:00 JST (UTC+9)		Report	Onose 34'; Kozuka 36'	Stadium: Paloma Mizuho Stadium; Attendance: 8,883; Referee: Masaaki Iemoto

29 April 2017 10	Thespakusatsu Gunma	1–4	Nagoya Grampus	Maebashi
19:00 JST (UTC+9)	Park (yellow card) 22'; Funatsu (yellow card) 34'; Choi (yellow card) 44'; Yamagishi 45+2'; Suzuki (yellow card) 48'; Matsushita (yellow card) 90+4'	Report	Aoki (yellow card) 31'; Sakai 63'; Simović 69'; Nagai 73'; Garcia 90+1'	Stadium: Shoda Shoyu Stadium Gunma; Attendance: 5,629; Referee: Shoichiro Mikami

3 May 2017 11	Nagoya Grampus	1–1	Kyoto Sanga	Toyota
15:00 JST (UTC+9)	Sugimori (yellow card) 50'; Taguchi (yellow card) 54'; Simović 90+1'	Report	Oris 40'	Stadium: Toyota Stadium; Attendance: 36,755; Referee: Koichiro Fukushima

7 May 2017 12	Montedio Yamagata	0–0	Nagoya Grampus	Tendō
14:00 JST (UTC+9)	Honda (yellow card) 38'	Report		Stadium: ND Soft Stadium Yamagata; Attendance: 9,573; Referee: Jumpei Iida

13 May 2017 13	Oita Trinita	4–1	Nagoya Grampus	Ōita
14:00 JST (UTC+9)	Kotegawa 21'; Goto 53' (pen.), 57', 85'	Report	Simović 81'	Stadium: Ōita Bank Dome; Attendance: 8,024; Referee: Toru Kakinuma

17 May 2017 14	Nagoya Grampus	2–1	Machida Zelvia	Nagoya
19:00 JST (UTC+9)	Isomura (yellow card) 5'; Tamada 10'; Washington (yellow card) 81'; Simović 90+2'	Report	Fukatsu (yellow card) 58'; Yazawa 76'; Matsumoto 90'	Stadium: Paloma Mizuho Stadium; Attendance: 7,708; Referee: Hiroyoshi Takayama

21 May 2017 15	Ehime	1–2	Nagoya Grampus	Matsuyama
16:00 JST (UTC+9)	Kondo 27' (yellow card) 64'; Arita (yellow card) 38'	Report	Taguchi 44'; Isomura (yellow card) 51'; Tamada 59'; Simović (yellow card) 89'	Stadium: Ningineer Stadium; Attendance: 7,863; Referee: Shuhei Shimizu

27 May 2017 16	Yokohama	1–2	Nagoya Grampus	Yokohama
18:00 JST (UTC+9)	Laajab 8' (yellow card) 78'; Sato (red card) 85'	Report	Washington (yellow card) 2'; Kushibiki (yellow card) 10'; Sugimori (yellow card) 50'; Simović 55', 78' (yellow card) 56'	Stadium: Nippatsu Mitsuzawa Stadium; Attendance: 10,769; Referee: Akihiko Ikeuchi

3 June 2017 17	Nagoya Grampus	2–3	Zweigen Kanazawa	Nagoya
14:00 JST (UTC+9)	Simović 24'; Sugimoto 69'	Report	Sato 45+1', 87'; Nakami (yellow card) 53'; Ota (yellow card) 55'; Kaneko 61'	Stadium: Paloma Mizuho Stadium; Attendance: 14,746; Referee: Kazuyoshi Enomoto

10 June 2017 18	Tokyo Verdy	2–1	Nagoya Grampus	Tokyo
15:00 JST (UTC+9)	Vieira 65', 67' (yellow card) 68'	Report	Sugimori 15'; Y.Kobayashi (yellow card) 87'	Stadium: Ajinomoto Stadium; Attendance: 12,659; Referee: Atsushi Kamimura

17 June 2017 19	Avispa Fukuoka	3–1	Nagoya Grampus	Fukuoka
14:00 JST (UTC+9)	Gilsinho (yellow card) 27'; Iwashita (yellow card) 50'; Ishizu 71', 90+1'; Jogo 83'	Report	Simović 14'; Oshitani (red card) 59'	Stadium: Level5 Stadium; Attendance: 13,281; Referee: Masaaki Toma

25 June 2017 20	Nagoya Grampus	2–0	V-Varen Nagasaki	Nagoya
18:30 JST (UTC+9)	Takasugi 34' (o.g.); Aoki 43'; Y.Kobayashi (yellow card) 90+4'	Report		Stadium: Paloma Mizuho Stadium; Attendance: 10,175; Referee: Itaru Hirose

1 July 2017 21	Shonan Bellmare	2–1	Nagoya Grampus	Hiratsuka
19:00 JST (UTC+9)	Shimamura 45'; Dinei 50' (yellow card) 87'	Report	Sugimori (yellow card) 33' (goal) 57'; Garcia (yellow card) 64'	Stadium: Shonan BMW Stadium Hiratsuka; Attendance: 11,070; Referee: Yudai Yamamoto

8 July 2017 22	Nagoya Grampus	0–2	Tokushima Vortis	Toyota
18:00 JST (UTC+9)	Washington (yellow card) 45'	Report	Izutsu 6'; Osaki (yellow card) 22'; Sugimoto (yellow card) 55'; Fujiwara (yellow card) 64'	Stadium: Toyota Stadium; Attendance: 12,959; Referee: Kenji Ogiya

16 July 2017 23	Nagoya Grampus	1–0	Montedio Yamagata	Nagoya
18:00 JST (UTC+9)	Oshitani 29'; Washington (yellow card) 49'; Sakai (yellow card) 66'	Report	Motegi (yellow card) 51'; Suzuki (yellow card) 77'; Sakano (yellow card) 88'	Stadium: Paloma Mizuho Stadium; Attendance: 11,251; Referee: Shoichiro Mikami

22 July 2017 24	Kyoto Sanga	3–1	Nagoya Grampus	Kyoto
18:00 JST (UTC+9)	Tulio 11', 63'; Koyamatsu 36'; Escudero (yellow card) 50'; Honda (yellow card) 60'	Report	Oshitani (yellow card) 19'; Gabriel Xavier 34'	Stadium: Nishikyogoku Athletic Stadium; Attendance: 10,750; Referee: Nobutsugu Murakami

30 July 2017 25	Roasso Kumamoto	0–1	Nagoya Grampus	Kumamoto
19:00 JST (UTC+9)	Gustavo (yellow card) 54'; Kotani (yellow card) 69'	Report	Y.Kobayashi (yellow card) 29'; Aoki 45'; Washington (yellow card) 46'	Stadium: Umakana Yokana Stadium; Attendance: 6,296; Referee: Hajime Matsuo

6 August 2017 26	Nagoya Grampus	7–4	Ehime	Nagoya
18:30 JST (UTC+9)	Satō 2'; Taguchi 18', 48', 90+6' (yellow card) 56'; Simović 33'; Aoki 74', 81'	Report	Kawahara (yellow card) 50' (goal) 70'; Niwa 58', 72'; Shirai 69'	Stadium: Paloma Mizuho Stadium; Attendance: 11,473; Referee: Yuichi Nishimura

12 August 2017 27	Nagoya Grampus	5–2	Matsumoto Yamaga	Nagoya
18:00 JST (UTC+9)	Taguchi (yellow card) 25'; Y.Shimokawa 33' (o.g.); Satō 35', 66'; Arai (yellow card) 47'; Gabriel Xavier 51'; Miyahara (yellow card) 59'; Aoki 88'	Report	Toma (yellow card) 37' (goal) 56'; Yamamoto (yellow card) 45+1'; Serginho 90+4'	Stadium: Paloma Mizuho Stadium; Attendance: 31,481; Referee: Tomohiro Inoue

16 August 2017 28	Machida Zelvia	3–4	Nagoya Grampus	Tokyo
19:00 JST (UTC+9)	Hirato 5' (red card) 89'; Matsumoto (yellow card) 45'; Inoue 65'; Todaka 72'	Report	Simović 24'; Arai 38'; Aoki 42'; Gabriel Xavier 90+3'	Stadium: Machida Athletic Stadium; Attendance: 6,007; Referee: Masaaki Iemoto Toma

20 August 2017 29	Nagoya Grampus	3–1	Avispa Fukuoka	Nagoya
18:00 JST (UTC+9)	Simović 19'; Aoki 61'; Lim 78'	Report	Mikado 11'	Stadium: Paloma Mizuho Stadium; Attendance: 13,914; Referee: Yuki Noda

26 August 2017 30	Nagoya Grampus	2–3	Yokohama	Nagoya
18:00 JST (UTC+9)	Simović 26' (pen.); Taguchi 30' (yellow card) 38' (yellow-red card) 53'; Gabriel Xavier (yellow card) 32'; Nagai (yellow card) 89'	Report	Jeong 9' (yellow card) 13'; Fujii (yellow card) 24'; Domingues (yellow card) 32'; Nomura 57'; Ōkubo 77'	Stadium: Paloma Mizuho Stadium; Attendance: 21,985; Referee: Hiroyuki Kimura

2 September 2017 31	Mito HollyHock	1–1	Nagoya Grampus	Mito
18:00 JST (UTC+9)	Maeda 34'	Report	Simović 53'	Stadium: K's denki Stadium Mito; Attendance: 9,240; Referee: Tomohiro Tsukada

9 September 2017 32	Nagoya Grampus	0–1	Oita Trinita	Nagoya
18:00 JST (UTC+9)	Lim (yellow card) 6'; Y.Kobayashi (yellow card) 86'	Report	Fukumori (yellow card) 45+1'; Kamifukumoto (yellow card) 72'; Suzuki 89'	Stadium: Paloma Mizuho Stadium; Attendance: 9,858; Referee: Akihiko Ikeuchi

17 September 2017 33	Zweigen Kanazawa	3–1	Nagoya Grampus	Kanazawa
17:00 JST (UTC+9)	Miyazaki 6' (pen.); Ishida (yellow card) 52'; Sato (yellow card) 55' (goal) 74'; Kaneko (yellow card) 72'	Report	Akiyama 58'; Gabriel Xavier (yellow card) 63'; Simović (yellow card) 67'	Stadium: Ishikawa Athletics Stadium; Attendance: 11,173; Referee: Yosuke Kubota

24 September 2017 34	Nagoya Grampus	4–1	Tokyo Verdy	Nagoya
17:00 JST (UTC+9)	Washington 17' (yellow card) 42'; Taguchi 23'; Izumi (yellow card) 68' (goal) 85'; Y.Kobayashi 76' (yellow card) 90+4'	Report	Douglas Vieira 55' (yellow card) 89'	Stadium: Paloma Mizuho Stadium; Attendance: 12,111; Referee: Yudai Yamamoto

1 October 2017 35	Gifu	2–6	Nagoya Grampus	Gifu
15:00 JST (UTC+9)	Omoto 22'; Sisi (yellow card) 45'; Namba 66'; Abe (yellow card) 90'	Report	Taguchi 32'; Gabriel Xavier 36', 46', 54'; Aoki 84'; Nagai 90+3'	Stadium: Gifu Nagaragawa Stadium; Attendance: 17,027; Referee: Hiroki Kasahara

7 October 2017 36	Renofa Yamaguchi	1–3	Nagoya Grampus	Yamaguchi
15:00 JST (UTC+9)	Luciatti (yellow card) 27'; Onose 63'; Torikai (yellow card) 64'; Kishida (yellow card) 72'	Report	Tamada 10'; Satō 36'; Taguchi 58'; Gabriel Xavier (yellow card) 90'	Stadium: Yamaguchi Ishin Park Stadium; Attendance: 6,902; Referee: Shoichiro Mikami

15 October 2017 37	Nagoya Grampus	3–2	Shonan Bellmare	Nagoya
14:00 JST (UTC+9)	Gabriel Xavier 4'; Taguchi (yellow card) 25'; Simović 50'; Tamada 54'	Report	Kikuchi 27', 40'	Stadium: Paloma Mizuho Stadium; Attendance: 14,567; Referee: Yuichi Nishimura

21 October 2017 38	V-Varen Nagasaki	1–1	Nagoya Grampus	Isahaya
19:00 JST (UTC+9)	Juanma (yellow card) 48' (goal) 90'; Iio (yellow card) 53'	Report	Kushibiki (yellow card) 10'; Taguchi (yellow card) 50'; Simović 88'	Stadium: Transcosmos Stadium Nagasaki; Attendance: 12,923; Referee: Hirokazu Otsubo

29 October 2017 39	Nagoya Grampus	4–2	Thespakusatsu Gunma	Nagoya
16:00 JST (UTC+9)	Aoki 18', 90+1'; Tamada 60'; Taguchi 86'; Oshitani (yellow card) 88'	Report	Funatsu 50'; Kang S-i 55'; Ishida (yellow card) 66'; Matsushita (yellow card) 76'	Stadium: Paloma Mizuho Stadium; Attendance: 7,393; Referee: Yosuke Kubota

5 November 2017 40	Fagiano Okayama	0–1	Nagoya Grampus	Okayama
13:00 JST (UTC+9)	Otake (yellow card) 39'; Kiyama (yellow card) 70'	Report	Aoki 37'; Simović (yellow card) 90'	Stadium: City Light Stadium; Attendance: 12,286; Referee: Koichiro Fukushima

11 November 2017 41	Nagoya Grampus	0–3	JEF United Chiba	Toyota
14:00 JST (UTC+9)		Report	Kim.B-y (yellow card) 33'; Larrivey 54', 65'; Tameda 63'	Stadium: Toyota Stadium; Attendance: 28,697; Referee: Hiroyoshi Takayama

19 November 2017 42	Kamatamare Sanuki	0–2	Nagoya Grampus	Marugame
16:00 JST (UTC+9)	Hara (yellow card) 36'; Nishi (yellow card) 52'; Yamamoto (yellow card) 74'	Report	Simović 26'; Kushibiki 69'; Oshitani (yellow card) 90+4'	Stadium: Pikara Stadium; Attendance: 7,994; Referee: Hiromichi Oka

==== J1 League Promotion Playoffs ====
26 November 2017 Semifinal	Nagoya Grampus	4–2	JEF United Chiba	Nagoya
16:00 JST (UTC+9)	Gabriel Xavier (yellow card) 9'; Taguchi 61'; Washington (yellow card) 64'; Simović 66', 86', 90+6' (yellow card) 82'	Report	Funayama (yellow card) 31'; Larrivey 45+2', 90' (yellow card) 62'; Kim (yellow card) 69'	Stadium: Paloma Mizuho Stadium; Attendance: 18,350; Referee: Nobutsugu Murakami

3 December 2017 Final	Nagoya Grampus	0–0	Avispa Fukuoka	Toyota
16:00 JST (UTC+9)	Simović (yellow card) 53'; Aoki (yellow card) 80'; Takeda (yellow card) 90+4'	Report	Matsuda (yellow card) 8'; Saneto (yellow card) 50'	Stadium: Toyota Stadium; Attendance: 37,959; Referee: Hiroyuki Kimura

=== Emperor's Cup ===
21 June 2017 Second Round	Nagoya Grampus	6–0	SRC Hiroshima	Nagoya
19:00 JST (UTC+9)	Uchida 4' (yellow card) 63'; Oshitani (yellow card) 22' (goal) 82'; Aoki 53', 61'; Sugimori 90'; Satō 90+2'	Report	T.Tsubosuke (yellow card) 21'	Stadium: Paloma Mizuho Stadium

12 July 2017 Third Round	Vanraure Hachinohe	0–1	Nagoya Grampus	Nagoya
19:00 JST (UTC+9)		Report	Nagai 53'	Stadium: Paloma Mizuho Stadium
Note: Match abandoned after during the second half due to a thunderstorm.

2 August 2017 Third Round	Vanraure Hachinohe	1–2	Nagoya Grampus	Nagoya
19:00 JST (UTC+9)	S.Murakami 70'	Report	S.Kobayashi (yellow card) 25'; Nagai 53'; Washington 85'	Stadium: Paloma Mizuho Stadium

20 September 2017 Fourth Round	Nagoya Grampus	0–1	Cerezo Osaka	Nagoya
19:00 JST (UTC+9)	Washington (yellow card) 67'	Report	Fukumitsu 6'; Akiyama (yellow card) 27'; Ricardo Santos (yellow card) 90+2'	Stadium: Paloma Mizuho Stadium; Attendance: 6,569

== Squad statistics ==
As of match played 3 December 2017

=== Appearances and goals ===
No.	Pos	Nat	Player	Total		J2-League		J-League Playoffs		Emperor's Cup	
No.	Pos	Nat	Player	Apps	Goals	Apps	Goals	Apps	Goals	Apps	Goals
1	GK	(Japan) JPN	Seigo Narazaki	29	0	29	0	0	0	0	0
2	DF	(Japan) JPN	Ikki Arai	6	1	6	1	0	0	0	0
3	DF	(Japan) JPN	Kazuki Kushibiki	39	1	31+3	1	2	0	3	0
7	MF	(Japan) JPN	Taishi Taguchi	38	10	34	9	2	1	1+1	0
8	MF	(Brazil) BRA	Washington	33	2	26+3	1	2	0	1+1	1
9	FW	(Sweden) SWE	Robin Simović	45	21	26+14	18	2	3	1+2	0
10	FW	(Brazil) BRA	Felipe Garcia	20	4	2+17	4	0	0	1	0
11	FW	(Japan) JPN	Hisato Satō	33	6	25+3	5	2	0	1+2	1
15	MF	(Japan) JPN	Kazuya Miyahara	45	0	41	0	2	0	1+1	0
16	GK	(Japan) JPN	Yohei Takeda	12	0	9	0	2	0	1	0
17	MF	(Japan) JPN	Yuki Kobayashi	30	1	26	1	2	0	2	0
18	GK	(Japan) JPN	Tsubasa Shibuya	6	0	4	0	0	0	2	0
19	FW	(Japan) JPN	Yuki Oshitani	18	2	7+9	1	0	0	2	1
21	MF	(Japan) JPN	Kohei Hattanda	16	0	8+8	0	0	0	0	0
23	MF	(Japan) JPN	Ryota Aoki	30	13	24+2	11	2	0	1+1	2
25	MF	(Japan) JPN	Ryuji Sugimoto	18	2	2+14	2	0	0	1+1	0
27	FW	(Japan) JPN	Koki Sugimori	28	3	18+8	2	0	0	0+2	1
28	FW	(Japan) JPN	Keiji Tamada	31	6	25+3	6	0+2	0	1	0
29	MF	(Japan) JPN	Ryuji Izumi	43	1	36+3	1	2	0	1+1	0
32	MF	(Japan) JPN	Shunpei Fukahori	2	0	1+1	0	0	0	0	0
36	DF	(Japan) JPN	Ryusuke Sakai	12	1	8+2	1	0	0	2	0
37	FW	(South Korea) KOR	Lim Seung-gyeom	14	1	10+2	1	0+2	0	0	0
38	FW	(Japan) JPN	Ryo Nagai	26	7	11+12	6	0+1	0	2	1
39	DF	(Japan) JPN	Kenta Uchida	21	2	16+2	1	0	0	3	1
40	MF	(Japan) JPN	Yosuke Akiyama	9	1	7+2	1	0	0	0	0
44	MF	(Brazil) BRA	Gabriel Xavier	18	7	16	7	2	0	0	0
Players away on loan:
6	DF	(Japan) JPN	Shota Kobayashi	3	0	0+1	0	0	0	2	0
14	MF	(Japan) JPN	Ryota Tanabe	3	0	1+1	0	0	0	0+1	0
20	MF	(Japan) JPN	Asahi Yada	2	0	0	0	0	0	2	0
Players who left Nagoya Grampus during the season:
4	DF	(Brazil) BRA	Charles	5	0	5	0	0	0	0	0
5	DF	(Japan) JPN	Shun Obu	1	0	1	0	0	0	0	0
13	MF	(Japan) JPN	Ryota Isomura	10	0	8+1	0	0	0	1	0
26	MF	(Japan) JPN	Genki Miyachi	1	0	0	0	0	0	1	0

=== Goal Scorers ===
Place	Position	Nation	Number	Name	J-League	J-League Playoffs	Emperor's Cup	Total
1	FW	(Sweden)	9	Robin Simović	18	3	0	18
2	MF	(Japan)	23	Ryota Aoki	11	0	2	13
3	MF	(Japan)	7	Taishi Taguchi	9	1	0	10
4	MF	(Brazil)	44	Gabriel Xavier	7	0	0	7
4	FW	(Japan)	38	Ryo Nagai	6	0	1	7
6	FW	(Japan)	28	Keiji Tamada	6	0	0	6
6	FW	(Japan)	11	Hisato Satō	5	0	1	6
8				Own goal	5	0	0	5
9	FW	(Brazil)	10	Felipe Garcia	4	0	0	4
10	FW	(Japan)	27	Koki Sugimori	2	0	1	3
11	MF	(Japan)	25	Ryuji Sugimoto	2	0	0	2
11	DF	(Japan)	39	Kenta Uchida	1	0	1	2
11	FW	(Japan)	19	Yuki Oshitani	1	0	1	2
11	MF	(Brazil)	8	Washington	1	0	1	2
16	DF	(Japan)	36	Ryusuke Sakai	1	0	0	1
16	DF	(Japan)	2	Ikki Arai	1	0	0	1
16	FW	(South Korea)	37	Lim Seung-gyeom	1	0	0	1
16	MF	(Japan)	40	Yosuke Akiyama	1	0	0	1
16	MF	(Japan)	17	Yuki Kobayashi	1	0	0	1
16	MF	(Japan)	29	Ryuji Izumi	1	0	0	1
16	DF	(Japan)	3	Kazuki Kushibiki	1	0	0	1
				TOTALS	85	4	8	97

=== Disciplinary record ===
Number	Nation	Position	Name	J-League		J-League Playoffs		Emperor's Cup		Total	
Number	Nation	Position	Name	Yellow card	Red card	Yellow card	Red card	Yellow card	Red card	Yellow card	Red card
2	(Japan)	DF	Ikki Arai	1	0	0	0	1	0		
3	(Japan)	DF	Kazuki Kushibiki	2	0	0	0	0	0	2	0
6	(Japan)	DF	Shota Kobayashi	1	0	0	0	0	0	1	0
7	(Japan)	MF	Taishi Taguchi	8	1	0	0	0	0	8	1
8	(Brazil)	MF	Washington	8	0	1	0	1	0	10	0
9	(Sweden)	FW	Robin Simović	5	0	2	0	0	0	7	0
10	(Brazil)	FW	Felipe Garcia	2	0	0	0	0	0	2	0
13	(Japan)	MF	Ryota Isomura	2	0	0	0	0	0	2	0
15	(Japan)	MF	Kazuya Miyahara	2	0	0	0	0	0	2	0
16	(Japan)	GK	Yohei Takeda	0	0	1	0	0	0	1	0
17	(Japan)	MF	Yuki Kobayashi	5	0	0	0	0	0	5	0
19	(Japan)	FW	Yuki Oshitani	3	1	0	0	1	0	4	1
23	(Japan)	MF	Ryota Aoki	1	0	1	0	0	0	2	0
25	(Japan)	MF	Ryuji Sugimoto	1	0	0	0	0	0	1	0
27	(Japan)	FW	Koki Sugimori	3	0	0	0	0	0	3	0
28	(Japan)	FW	Keiji Tamada	1	0	0	0	0	0	1	0
29	(Japan)	MF	Ryuji Izumi	2	0	0	0	0	0	2	0
36	(Japan)	DF	Ryusuke Sakai	1	0	0	0	0	0	1	0
37	(Japan)	FW	Lim Seung-gyeom	1	0	0	0	0	0	1	0
38	(Japan)	FW	Ryo Nagai	1	0	0	0	0	0	1	0
39	(Japan)	DF	Kenta Uchida	2	0	0	0	1	0	3	0
44	(Brazil)	MF	Gabriel Xavier	3	0	1	0	0	0	4	0
			TOTALS	54	2	6	0	4	0	64	2
