= 2018 Ehime FC season =

Ehime FC
2018 season
- Manager: Shuichi Mase; Kenta Kawai
- Stadium: Ningineer Stadium
- J2 League: 18th

2018 Ehime FC season.

== J2 League ==
Match	Date	Team	Score	Team	Venue	Attendance
1	2018.02.25	Ehime FC	1-2	Zweigen Kanazawa	Ningineer Stadium	3,439
2	2018.03.04	Renofa Yamaguchi FC	1-0	Ehime FC	Ishin Me-Life Stadium	5,095
3	2018.03.11	Yokohama FC	3-0	Ehime FC	NHK Spring Mitsuzawa Football Stadium	4,464
4	2018.03.17	Ehime FC	1-2	Roasso Kumamoto	Ningineer Stadium	2,436
5	2018.03.21	Albirex Niigata	0-1	Ehime FC	Denka Big Swan Stadium	12,796
6	2018.03.25	Ehime FC	1-3	FC Gifu	Ningineer Stadium	2,348
7	2018.04.01	Fagiano Okayama	0-1	Ehime FC	City Light Stadium	9,117
8	2018.04.08	Ehime FC	0-2	Montedio Yamagata	Ningineer Stadium	3,427
9	2018.04.15	Kamatamare Sanuki	1-1	Ehime FC	Pikara Stadium	3,004
10	2018.04.21	Ehime FC	0-0	Ventforet Kofu	Ningineer Stadium	2,255
11	2018.04.28	Ehime FC	1-1	Matsumoto Yamaga FC	Ningineer Stadium	3,207
12	2018.05.03	Tokushima Vortis	2-0	Ehime FC	Pocarisweat Stadium	6,756
13	2018.05.06	Ehime FC	1-1	Tochigi SC	Ningineer Stadium	2,196
14	2018.05.12	Avispa Fukuoka	2-0	Ehime FC	Level5 Stadium	6,684
15	2018.05.20	Ehime FC	1-2	Kyoto Sanga FC	Ningineer Stadium	3,741
16	2018.05.26	Tokyo Verdy	0-0	Ehime FC	Ajinomoto Stadium	4,125
17	2018.06.02	FC Machida Zelvia	2-1	Ehime FC	Machida Stadium	3,610
18	2018.06.10	Ehime FC	1-0	Oita Trinita	Ningineer Stadium	2,720
19	2018.06.16	JEF United Chiba	2-1	Ehime FC	Fukuda Denshi Arena	9,020
20	2018.06.23	Ehime FC	0-1	Mito HollyHock	Ningineer Stadium	2,449
21	2018.06.30	Omiya Ardija	1-1	Ehime FC	NACK5 Stadium Omiya	9,886
22	2018.07.08	FC Gifu	1-2	Ehime FC	Gifu Nagaragawa Stadium	5,787
23	2018.07.15	Ehime FC	1-0	Tokushima Vortis	Ningineer Stadium	5,319
24	2018.07.21	Ehime FC	2-0	Fagiano Okayama	Ningineer Stadium	3,135
25	2018.07.25	Oita Trinita	0-1	Ehime FC	Oita Bank Dome	4,880
26	2018.07.29	Mito HollyHock	4-1	Ehime FC	K's denki Stadium Mito	3,615
27	2018.08.04	Ehime FC	2-0	Renofa Yamaguchi FC	Ningineer Stadium	3,370
28	2018.08.12	Ehime FC	1-5	Omiya Ardija	Ningineer Stadium	3,597
29	2018.08.18	Ventforet Kofu	0-1	Ehime FC	Yamanashi Chuo Bank Stadium	7,087
30	2018.08.25	Montedio Yamagata	1-1	Ehime FC	ND Soft Stadium Yamagata	5,615
31	2018.09.01	Ehime FC	0-0	Albirex Niigata	Ningineer Stadium	3,216
32	2018.09.08	Ehime FC	0-0	Kamatamare Sanuki	Ningineer Stadium	2,545
33	2018.09.15	Tochigi SC	1-3	Ehime FC	Tochigi Green Stadium	9,459
34	2018.09.22	Ehime FC	2-3	Avispa Fukuoka	Ningineer Stadium	2,826
35	2018.09.29	Ehime FC	1-0	JEF United Chiba	Ningineer Stadium	2,515
36	2018.10.06	Matsumoto Yamaga FC	0-0	Ehime FC	Sunpro Alwin	11,906
37	2018.10.13	Ehime FC	0-2	Yokohama FC	Ningineer Stadium	4,076
38	2018.10.19	Zweigen Kanazawa	0-0	Ehime FC	Ishikawa Athletics Stadium	2,512
39	2018.10.28	Ehime FC	2-2	Tokyo Verdy	Ningineer Stadium	3,594
40	2018.11.04	Kyoto Sanga FC	0-1	Ehime FC	Kyoto Nishikyogoku Athletic Stadium	9,036
41	2018.11.11	Ehime FC	0-2	FC Machida Zelvia	Ningineer Stadium	3,971
42	2018.11.17	Roasso Kumamoto	3-0	Ehime FC	Egao Kenko Stadium	5,647
