= 2018 Montedio Yamagata season =

Montedio Yamagata
2018 season
- Manager: Takashi Kiyama
- Stadium: ND Soft Stadium Yamagata
- J2 League: 12th
Home colours	Away colours	Third colours

2018 Montedio Yamagata season.

== Squad ==
As of 30 January 2018. Note: Flags indicate national team as defined under FIFA eligibility rules; some limited exceptions apply. Players may hold more than one non-FIFA nationality.

No.	Pos.	Nation	Player
1	GK	JPN	Tsuyoshi Kodama
2	DF	BRA	Jairo Rodrigues
3	DF	JPN	Naoki Kuriyama
4	DF	JPN	Kai Miki
5	DF	JPN	Rikiya Motegi
6	DF	JPN	Takumi Yamada
7	MF	JPN	Ryosuke Matsuoka
8	MF	BRA	Álvaro Rodrigues
9	FW	BRA	Felipe Alves
10	FW	JPN	Yuji Senuma
11	FW	JPN	Toyofumi Sakano
14	MF	JPN	Takuya Honda
15	DF	JPN	Kenichi Kaga
16	MF	JPN	Seigo Kobayashi
17	MF	JPN	Shun Nakamura

No.	Pos.	Nation	Player
18	MF	JPN	Shuto Minami
19	MF	JPN	Ryota Matsumoto
20	MF	JPN	Kaito Anzai
21	GK	JPN	Masatoshi Kushibiki
22	FW	JPN	Shunta Nakamura
23	DF	JPN	Yuta Kumamoto
25	MF	JPN	Koya Yuruki
27	FW	JPN	Shuto Kitagawa
28	GK	JPN	Hayato Settsu
29	MF	KOR	Koo Bon-hyeok
33	DF	JPN	Ryoma Nishimura
35	DF	JPN	Tatsuya Sakai
39	FW	JPN	Masato Nakayama
40	GK	JPN	Kotaro Iba

== J2 League ==
=== League table ===
Pos	Team	Pld	W	D	L	GF	GA	GD	Pts
11	Tokushima Vortis	42	16	8	18	48	42	+6	56
12	Montedio Yamagata	42	14	14	14	49	51	−2	56
13	Zweigen Kanazawa	42	14	13	15	52	48	+4	55

Source: 2018 MEIJI YASUDA J2 LEAGUE League table
Rules for classification: 1) Points; 2) Goal difference; 3) Goals scored

=== Match details ===
J2 League match details
Match	Date	Team	Score	Team	Venue	Attendance
1	2018.02.25	Mito HollyHock	3-0	Montedio Yamagata	K's denki Stadium Mito	7,858
2	2018.03.04	Oita Trinita	2-2	Montedio Yamagata	Oita Bank Dome	9,024
3	2018.03.11	Roasso Kumamoto	1-2	Montedio Yamagata	Egao Kenko Stadium	4,094
4	2018.03.17	Montedio Yamagata	2-2	FC Machida Zelvia	ND Soft Stadium Yamagata	7,732
5	2018.03.21	Montedio Yamagata	2-3	Yokohama FC	ND Soft Stadium Yamagata	5,116
6	2018.03.25	Tokyo Verdy	0-0	Montedio Yamagata	Ajinomoto Stadium	4,336
7	2018.03.31	Montedio Yamagata	0-1	Renofa Yamaguchi FC	ND Soft Stadium Yamagata	5,029
8	2018.04.08	Ehime FC	0-2	Montedio Yamagata	Ningineer Stadium	3,427
9	2018.04.15	Montedio Yamagata	1-0	Kyoto Sanga FC	ND Soft Stadium Yamagata	4,911
10	2018.04.22	Matsumoto Yamaga FC	1-0	Montedio Yamagata	Matsumotodaira Park Stadium	12,038
11	2018.04.28	Montedio Yamagata	0-1	Tochigi SC	ND Soft Stadium Yamagata	8,046
12	2018.05.03	Avispa Fukuoka	2-1	Montedio Yamagata	Level5 Stadium	9,620
13	2018.05.06	Montedio Yamagata	2-0	Kamatamare Sanuki	ND Soft Stadium Yamagata	7,512
14	2018.05.13	Montedio Yamagata	1-1	Omiya Ardija	ND Soft Stadium Yamagata	8,801
15	2018.05.20	Albirex Niigata	0-0	Montedio Yamagata	Denka Big Swan Stadium	18,397
16	2018.05.27	Montedio Yamagata	2-1	Zweigen Kanazawa	ND Soft Stadium Yamagata	5,298
17	2018.06.02	Fagiano Okayama	2-2	Montedio Yamagata	City Light Stadium	10,397
18	2018.06.10	Montedio Yamagata	2-1	JEF United Chiba	ND Soft Stadium Yamagata	6,606
19	2018.06.16	Ventforet Kofu	1-2	Montedio Yamagata	Yamanashi Chuo Bank Stadium	7,755
20	2018.06.23	Montedio Yamagata	3-2	Tokushima Vortis	ND Soft Stadium Yamagata	6,012
21	2018.06.30	Montedio Yamagata	2-0	FC Gifu	ND Soft Stadium Yamagata	5,368
22	2018.07.07	Yokohama FC	1-1	Montedio Yamagata	NHK Spring Mitsuzawa Football Stadium	7,246
23	2018.07.15	Tochigi SC	1-0	Montedio Yamagata	Tochigi Green Stadium	6,051
24	2018.07.21	Montedio Yamagata	1-2	Albirex Niigata	ND Soft Stadium Yamagata	11,101
25	2018.07.25	Montedio Yamagata	1-0	Fagiano Okayama	ND Soft Stadium Yamagata	4,675
27	2018.08.04	Kyoto Sanga FC	1-0	Montedio Yamagata	Kyoto Nishikyogoku Athletic Stadium	3,949
28	2018.08.11	Montedio Yamagata	2-1	Tokyo Verdy	ND Soft Stadium Yamagata	13,609
29	2018.08.18	Tokushima Vortis	5-1	Montedio Yamagata	Pocarisweat Stadium	4,673
30	2018.08.25	Montedio Yamagata	1-1	Ehime FC	ND Soft Stadium Yamagata	5,615
31	2018.09.01	Montedio Yamagata	2-1	Roasso Kumamoto	ND Soft Stadium Yamagata	4,866
32	2018.09.09	Renofa Yamaguchi FC	0-1	Montedio Yamagata	Ishin Me-Life Stadium	4,146
33	2018.09.15	Montedio Yamagata	1-1	Ventforet Kofu	ND Soft Stadium Yamagata	6,708
26	2018.09.19	Kamatamare Sanuki	1-1	Montedio Yamagata	Pikara Stadium	1,510
34	2018.09.24	Zweigen Kanazawa	1-0	Montedio Yamagata	Ishikawa Athletics Stadium	3,783
35	2018.09.30	Montedio Yamagata	3-3	Matsumoto Yamaga FC	ND Soft Stadium Yamagata	6,694
36	2018.10.07	FC Machida Zelvia	0-0	Montedio Yamagata	Machida Stadium	5,563
37	2018.10.14	JEF United Chiba	2-1	Montedio Yamagata	Fukuda Denshi Arena	8,992
38	2018.10.21	Montedio Yamagata	2-2	Avispa Fukuoka	ND Soft Stadium Yamagata	5,851
39	2018.10.28	Montedio Yamagata	0-1	Mito HollyHock	ND Soft Stadium Yamagata	5,692
40	2018.11.04	FC Gifu	0-1	Montedio Yamagata	Gifu Nagaragawa Stadium	6,056
41	2018.11.10	Omiya Ardija	2-1	Montedio Yamagata	NACK5 Stadium Omiya	12,240
42	2018.11.17	Montedio Yamagata	1-1	Oita Trinita	ND Soft Stadium Yamagata	6,852
