= Kenta Kawai =

Japanese footballer and manager

Kenta Kawai 川井 健太
Personal information
- Full name: Kenta Kawai
- Date of birth: June 7, 1981 (age 45)
- Place of birth: Uwajima, Ehime, Japan
- Height: 1.82 m (5 ft 11 1/2 in)
- Position: Forward

Youth career
- 1997–1999: Ehime FC
- 2000–2003: Momoyama Gakuin University

Senior career*
Years	Team	Apps	(Gls)
2004–2006	Ehime FC	24	(6)
Total		24	(6)

Managerial career
- 2015–2017: Ehime FC Ladies
- 2018–2020: Ehime FC
- 2022–2024: Sagan Tosu
- 2025–: Hokkaido Consadole Sapporo
- * Club domestic league appearances and goals

Kenta Kawai (川井 健太, Kawai Kenta; born June 7, 1981) is a Japanese professional football manager and former player who is currently manager of J2 League club Hokkaido Consadole Sapporo. His brother Koichi Kawai is also a footballer.

== Playing career ==
Kawai was born in Uwajima on June 7, 1981. After graduating from Momoyama Gakuin University, he joined Japan Football League club Ehime FC based in his local in 2004. His brother Koichi Kawai was also playing for this club from 2001. He played many matches in first season. However he could not play at all in the match in 2005. Although the club was promoted to J2 League from 2006, he could not play many matches and retired end of 2006 season.

== Coaching career ==
After the retirement, Kawai started coaching career at Ehime Women's College based in his local Uwajima in 2008. He served as manager until 2017. In 2012, he also signed with Nadeshiko League club Ehime FC Ladies. He served as a coach under manager Kenichi Ego who is teammate as player in 2006. In 2015, Kawai became a manager as Ego successor. He managed the club until 2017. In 2018, he signed with J2 League club Ehime FC and became a manager for youth team. In May 2018, top team manager Shuichi Mase was sacked when the club was at the 20th place of 22 clubs. Kawai became a manager for top team as Mase successor. Kawai rose the club and finished at the 18th place in 2018 season.

== Career statistics ==
Appearances and goals by club, season and competition
Club	Season	League			Emperor's Cup		Total	
Club	Season	Division	Apps	Goals	Apps	Goals	Apps	Goals
Ehime FC	2004	Football League	22	6			22	6
Ehime FC	2005	Football League	0	0			0	0
Ehime FC	2006	J2 League	2	0			2	0
Career total			24	6	0	0	24	6

== Managerial statistics ==
As of 23 December 2025

Team	From	To	Record				
Team	From	To	G	W	D	L	Win %
Ehime FC	2018	2021	114	30	24	60	26.32
Sagan Tosu	2022	2024	114	33	33	48	28.95
Hokkaido Consadole Sapporo	2026	Present	0	0	0	0	—
Total			228	63	57	108	27.63
