= Kenta Uchida =

Japanese footballer

Kenta Uchida 内田 健太
Personal information
- Full name: Kenta Uchida
- Date of birth: 2 October 1989 (age 37)
- Place of birth: Yokkaichi, Mie, Japan
- Height: 1.78 m (5 ft 10 in)
- Position: Midfielder

Team information
- Current team: Ventforet Kofu
- Number: 39

Youth career
- 2005–2007: Sanfrecce Hiroshima

Senior career*
Years	Team	Apps	(Gls)
2008–2009	Sanfrecce Hiroshima	0	(0)
2009–2012	Ehime FC	91	(8)
2013–2015	Shimizu S-Pulse	3	(1)
2014	→ Kataller Toyama (loan)	30	(1)
2015–2016	Ehime FC	55	(7)
2017–2018	Nagoya Grampus	24	(1)
2018	→ Montedio Yamagata (loan)	9	(0)
2019–	Ventforet Kofu		
- * Club domestic league appearances and goals as of 6 January 2019

Kenta Uchida (内田 健太, Uchida Kenta; born 2 October 1989 in Yokkaichi, Mie) is a Japanese football player who plays for Ventforet Kofu.

== Career ==
On 22 December 2016, Uchida signed for Nagoya Grampus after a two years-period at Ehime FC.

== Career statistics ==
=== Club ===
As of end of 2018 season

Appearances and goals by club, season and competition
Club	Season	League			National Cup		League Cup		Continental		Other		Total	
Club	Season	Division	Apps	Goals	Apps	Goals	Apps	Goals	Apps	Goals	Apps	Goals	Apps	Goals
Sanfrecce Hiroshima	2008	J2 League	0	0	0	0	-		-		-		0	0
Sanfrecce Hiroshima	2009	J1 League	0	0	0	0	0	0	-		-		0	0
Sanfrecce Hiroshima	Total		0	0	0	0	0	0	-	-	-	-	0	0
Ehime FC	2009	J2 League	12	0	1	0	-		-		-		13	0
Ehime FC	2010	J2 League	20	4	1	0	-		-		-		21	4
Ehime FC	2011	J2 League	26	2	2	1	-		-		-		28	3
Ehime FC	2012	J2 League	31	2	1	0	-		-		-		32	2
Ehime FC	Total		89	8	5	1	-	-	-	-	-	-	94	9
Shimizu S-Pulse	2013	J1 League	2	1	0	0	2	0	–		–		4	1
Shimizu S-Pulse	2014	J1 League	0	0	0	0	0	0	–		–		1	0
Shimizu S-Pulse	2015	J1 League	1	0	0	0	0	0	–		–		1	0
Shimizu S-Pulse	Total		3	1	0	0	2	0	-	-	-	-	5	1
Kataller Toyama (loan)	2014	J2 League	30	1	1	1	–		–		–		32	2
Ehime FC	2015	J2 League	17	4	0	0	–		–		–		17	4
Ehime FC	2016	J2 League	38	3	0	0	–		–		–		38	3
Ehime FC	Total		55	7	0	0	-	-	-	-	-	-	55	7
Nagoya Grampus	2017	J2 League	18	1	3	0	–		–		0	0	21	1
Nagoya Grampus	2018	J1 League	6	0	1	0	5	2	–		–		12	2
Nagoya Grampus	Total		24	1	4	0	5	2	-	-	0	0	33	3
Montedio Yamagata	2018	J2 League	9	0	0	0	–		–		–		9	0
Career total			210	18	10	0	7	2	-	-	0	0	227	20
