= Robin Simović =

Swedish footballer (born 1991)

Robin Šimović
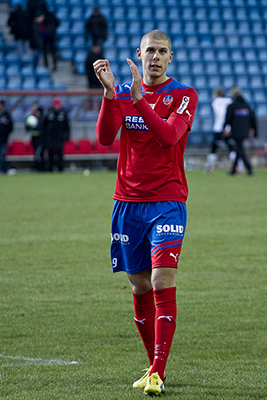

Personal information
- Date of birth: 29 May 1991 (age 35)
- Place of birth: Malmö, Sweden
- Height: 1.98 m (6 ft 6 in)
- Position: Forward

Youth career
- 1996–2000: Bunkeflo IF
- 2000–2010: Malmö FF

Senior career*
| Years | Team | Apps | (Gls) |
| 2010 | Malmö FF | 0 | (0) |
| 2010 | → Lunds BK (loan) | 0 | (0) |
| 2010 | → Lilla Torg FF (loan) | 10 | (3) |
| 2011 | IFK Klagshamn | 19 | (14) |
| 2012 | Ängelholms FF | 27 | (17) |
| 2013–2015 | Helsingborgs IF | 64 | (20) |
| 2016–2017 | Nagoya Grampus | 71 | (32) |
| 2018–2019 | Omiya Ardija | 53 | (14) |
| 2020 | Livorno | 2 | (0) |
| 2020 | Odd | 13 | (2) |
| 2021–2022 | Varbergs BoIS | 46 | (12) |
| 2023 | Jeonnam Dragons | 8 | (0) |
| 2023 | Rudeš | 5 | (0) |
| 2024 | Beerschot | 3 | (0) |
- * Club domestic league appearances and goals as of 14 April 2024

Robin Šimović (Croatian pronunciation: [sîːmoʋitɕ]; born 29 May 1991) is a Swedish professional footballer who plays as a forward. He is currently without a club.

== Career ==
Simović spent most of his youth playing for Malmö FF where he scored a total of 377 goals in 337 games for the various youth teams at the club. When his contract with Malmö expired at the end of 2010 the club instead preferred to move Dardan Rexhepi up into the first team and Simović left for fourth tier club IFK Klagshamn. After a successful year in Klagshamn he was signed by Superettan side Ängelholms FF.

At Ängelholm he became the second best goalscorer in the 2012 Superettan and was signed after the season by nearby Allsvenskan club Helsingborgs IF on a 3.5-year deal.

On 10 December 2015, Simović was confirmed along with country-man Ludvig Öhman to be joining Nagoya Grampus for the 2016 J-League season.

On 27 February 2016, Simović scored on his debut for Nagoya in a 1–0 away win against Jubilo Iwata. He scored his second goal in as many matches in his home debut in a 1–1 draw against defending champions Sanfrecce Hiroshima.

On 10 January 2018, Omiya Ardija announced the signing of Simović.

On 12 February 2020, he signed for Livorno.

On 31 August 2020, he moved to Odd in Norway. He left the club at the end of the year. On 16 February 2021, Simović joined Varbergs BoIS.

On 12 February 2024, Simović signed with Beerschot in Belgium until the end of the season.

== Career statistics ==
As of 26 November 2023

Appearances and goals by club, season and competition
| Club | Season | League | | | National cup | | League cup | | Continental | | Other | | Total | |
| Club | Season | Division | Apps | Goals | Apps | Goals | Apps | Goals | Apps | Goals | Apps | Goals | Apps | Goals |
|---|---|---|---|---|---|---|---|---|---|---|---|---|---|---|
| Malmö | 2010 | Allsvenskan | 0 | 0 | 0 | 0 | — | | — | | — | | 0 | 0 |
| Lund (loan) | 2010 | Swedish Division 1 | 0 | 0 | 0 | 0 | — | | — | | — | | 0 | 0 |
| Lilla Torg (loan) | 2010 | Swedish Division 2 | 10 | 3 | 0 | 0 | — | | — | | — | | 10 | 3 |
| IFK Klagshamn | 2011 | Swedish Division 2 | 18 | 15 | 0 | 0 | — | | — | | — | | 18 | 15 |
| Ängelholm | 2012 | Superettan | 27 | 17 | 0 | 0 | — | | — | | — | | 27 | 17 |
| Helsingborg | 2013 | Allsvenskan | 28 | 8 | 2 | 0 | — | | — | | — | | 30 | 8 |
| Helsingborg | 2014 | Allsvenskan | 11 | 0 | 2 | 0 | — | | — | | — | | 13 | 0 |
| Helsingborg | 2015 | Allsvenskan | 25 | 12 | 0 | 0 | — | | — | | — | | 25 | 12 |
| Helsingborg | Total | | 64 | 20 | 4 | 0 | — | | — | | — | | 68 | 20 |
| Nagoya Grampus | 2016 | J1 League | 29 | 11 | 0 | 0 | 2 | 0 | — | | — | | 31 | 11 |
| Nagoya Grampus | 2017 | J2 League | 40 | 18 | 3 | 0 | — | | — | | 2 | 3 | 45 | 21 |
| Nagoya Grampus | Total | | 69 | 29 | 3 | 0 | 2 | 0 | — | | 2 | 3 | 76 | 32 |
| Omiya Ardija | 2018 | J2 League | 26 | 6 | 2 | 0 | — | | — | | 1 | 0 | 29 | 6 |
| Omiya Ardija | 2019 | J2 League | 27 | 8 | 0 | 0 | — | | — | | 1 | 0 | 28 | 8 |
| Omiya Ardija | Total | | 53 | 14 | 2 | 0 | — | | — | | 2 | 0 | 57 | 14 |
| Livorno | 2019–20 | Serie B | 2 | 0 | 0 | 0 | — | | — | | — | | 2 | 0 |
| Odd | 2020 | Eliteserien | 13 | 2 | — | | — | | — | | — | | 13 | 2 |
| Varbergs BoIS | 2021 | Allsvenskan | 20 | 3 | 1 | 0 | — | | — | | — | | 21 | 3 |
| Varbergs BoIS | 2022 | Allsvenskan | 24 | 7 | 2 | 2 | — | | — | | — | | 13 | 0 |
| Varbergs BoIS | Total | | 44 | 10 | 3 | 2 | — | | — | | — | | 47 | 12 |
| Jeonnam Dragons | 2023 | K League 2 | 8 | 0 | 0 | 0 | — | | — | | — | | 8 | 0 |
| Rudeš | 2023–24 | HNL | 5 | 0 | 3 | 0 | — | | — | | — | | 8 | 0 |
| Career total | | | 313 | 110 | 15 | 2 | 2 | 0 | 0 | 0 | 4 | 3 | 334 | 115 |
