= Masanori Abe =

Japanese footballer

Masanori Abe 阿部 正紀
Personal information
- Full name: Masanori Abe
- Date of birth: 25 December 1991 (age 34)
- Place of birth: Kokubunji, Tokyo, Japan
- Height: 1.77 m (5 ft 10 in)
- Position: Centre-back

Youth career
- 2010–2013: Tokyo International University

Senior career*
Years	Team	Apps	(Gls)
2014–2019	FC Gifu	209	(7)
Total		209	(7)
- * Club domestic league appearances and goals as of 2 February 2020

Masanori Abe (阿部 正紀, Masanori Abe; born 25 December 1991) is a retired Japanese professional footballer who played for FC Gifu.

== Early life ==
Masanori was born in Kokubunji. He went to Tokyo International University.

== Career ==
Masanori spent his entire career at Gifu. He made his debut for the club against Kamatamare Sanuki on the 2 March 2014. He scored his first goal for the club against Roasso Kumamoto on the 23 September 2014, scoring in the 14th minute.

== Club statistics ==
Updated to 2 February 2020.

Club performance			League		Cup		League Cup		Total	
Season	Club	League	Apps	Goals	Apps	Goals	Apps	Goals	Apps	Goals
Japan			League		Emperor's Cup		J. League Cup		Total	
2014	FC Gifu	J2 League	37	1	1	0	–		38	1
2015	FC Gifu	J2 League	30	0	1	0	–		31	0
2016	FC Gifu	J2 League	38	4	0	0	–		38	4
2017	FC Gifu	J2 League	30	1	2	0	–		32	1
2018	FC Gifu	J2 League	41	1	1	0	–		41	1
2019	FC Gifu	J2 League	33	0	1	0	–		34	0
Total			209	7	6	0	–		215	7
