= Felipe Garcia (footballer, born 1990) =

Brazilian footballer

Personal information
- Full name: Felipe Garcia Gonçalves
- Date of birth: 6 November 1990 (age 36)
- Place of birth: Porto Alegre, Brazil
- Height: 1.85 m (6 ft 1 in)
- Positions: Attacking midfielder; winger

Team information
- Current team: São Bernardo
- Number: 9

Youth career
- RS Futebol
- 2008: São José-RS
- 2008–2009: Næstved

Senior career*
Years	Team	Apps	(Gls)
2009–2012	Næstved	78	(16)
2012	Aimoré	8	(0)
2013	Santo Ângelo	16	(1)
2013–2014	Pelotas	4	(1)
2014–2016	Brasil de Pelotas	68	(14)
2017–2018	Nagoya Grampus	19	(4)
2018	→ Goiás (loan)	12	(1)
2019–2020	Vitória	32	(2)
2020–2021	Chapecoense	16	(0)
2021–2022	Operário-PR	51	(5)
2023	ABC	25	(8)
2023–2024	Operário-PR	21	(2)
2024–	São Bernardo	67	(9)
- * Club domestic league appearances and goals as of 18 November 2026

Felipe Garcia Gonçalves (born 6 November 1990), known as Felipe Garcia, is a Brazilian professional footballer who plays as a winger or an attacking midfielder for São Bernardo.

== Club career ==
=== Næstved ===
Felipe Garcia was born in Porto Alegre, Rio Grande do Sul, and represented hometown club São José as a youth before moving abroad at early age, joining Danish 1st Division side Næstved Boldklub. After spending the first six months on trial at the under-19s, he signed a three-year contract and made his debut for the club on 4 April 2009, coming on as a second half substitute for Karsten Johansen in a 1–1 home draw against Lyngby BK. Five days later, again from the bench, he scored the equalizer in an away draw against Boldklubben Frem for the same scoreline.

On 25 October 2009 Felipe Garcia scored a brace in a 4–1 home routing of Thisted FC. He repeated the feat on 13 November 2011, in a 2–3 home loss against Esbjerg fB; it was also his last game for the club before leaving in that season's winter transfer window.

=== Back to Brazil ===
Felipe García decided to leave Næstved in July 2012, and signed for Aimoré shortly after. The following year he moved to Santo Ângelo, and after six months at the club, joined Pelotas. With the latter, he mainly contributed to their Recopa Gaúcha winning campaign in 2014, scoring twice in a 3–2 success.

=== Brasil de Pelotas ===
On 16 April 2014, Felipe Garcia agreed to a contract with Brasil de Pelotas. He achieved back-to-back promotions to Série C (2014) and Série B (2015), being an undisputed starter during both campaigns.

Felipe Garcia made his debut in the second division on 14 May 2016, starting and scoring a double in a 2–0 home win against Paraná. On 16 July he scored another brace, but in a 2–2 home draw against Vila Nova.

=== Nagoya Grampus ===
On 30 November 2016, Felipe Garcia signed for Japanese club Nagoya Grampus.

==== Goiás (loan) ====
On 30 January 2018, Felipe Garcia joined Goiás on loan until 1 January 2019.

=== Vitória ===
Vitória announced on 26 February 2019, that they had signed Garcia.

== Career statistics ==
As of match played 21 October 2017

Club	Season	League			State League		Cup		Continental		Other		Total	
Club	Season	Division	Apps	Goals	Apps	Goals	Apps	Goals	Apps	Goals	Apps	Goals	Apps	Goals
Næstved	2008–09	1st Division	11	1	—		—		—		—		11	1
Næstved	2009–10	1st Division	26	8	—		1	0	—		—		27	8
Næstved	2010–11	1st Division	27	5	—		—		—		—		27	5
Næstved	2011–12	1st Division	14	2	—		—		—		—		14	2
Næstved	Subtotal		78	16	—		1	0	—		—		79	16
Aimoré	2012	Gaúcho Série B	—		8	0	—		—		—		8	0
Santo Ângelo	2013	Gaúcho Série A2	—		16	1	—		—		—		16	1
Pelotas	2013	Gaúcho	—		0	0	—		—		15 (Note: Appearance(s) in Copa FGF)	2	15	2
Pelotas	2014	Gaúcho	—		4	1	—		—		1 (Note: Appearance(s) in Recopa Gaúcha)	2	5	3
Pelotas	Subtotal		—		4	1	—		—		16	4	20	5
Brasil de Pelotas	2014	Série D	12	1	—		—		—		—		12	1
Brasil de Pelotas	2015	Série C	21	0	18	3	2	0	—		—		41	3
Brasil de Pelotas	2016	Série B	35	13	10	2	1	0	—		—		46	15
Brasil de Pelotas	Subtotal		68	14	28	5	3	0	—		—		99	19
Nagoya Grampus	2017	J2 League	19	4	1	0	—		—		0	0	20	4
Career total			165	34	52	6	4	0	0	0	16	4	246	44

== Honours ==
Aimoré

- Campeonato Gaúcho Série B: 2012

Pelotas

- Recopa Gaúcha: 2014
