= Masahiro Kaneko =

Japanese footballer

Masahiro Kaneko 金子 昌広
Personal information
- Full name: Masahiro Kaneko
- Date of birth: 2 February 1991 (age 35)
- Place of birth: Tokorozawa, Saitama, Japan
- Height: 1.69 m (5 ft 7 in)
- Position: Midfielder

Team information
- Current team: Nara Club
- Number: 9

Youth career
- 2008–2012: Kokushikan University

Senior career*
Years	Team	Apps	(Gls)
2013–2014	Ventforet Kofu	9	(0)
2015–2021	Zweigen Kanazawa	143	(16)
2023-	Nara Club	13	(0)
- * Club domestic league appearances and goals as of 13/1/24 @ 18:38(AEST)

Masahiro Kaneko (金子 昌広, Kaneko Masahiro; born 2 February 1991 in Saitama) is a Japanese footballer who plays as a midfielder for Nara Club in the J3 League.

== Career ==
=== Ventforet Kofu ===
Kaneko played his professional debut for Ventforet Kofu in the J. League Division 1 on 2 March 2013 against Vegalta Sendai in which he played for 67 minutes before he was substituted by Akito Kawamoto as Ventforet drew the match 1–1.

== Career statistics ==
=== Club ===
Updated to end of 2018 season.

Club	Season	League		Emperor's Cup		J. League Cup		AFC		Total	
Club	Season	Apps	Goals	Apps	Goals	Apps	Goals	Apps	Goals	Apps	Goals
Ventforet Kofu	2013	9	0	1	0	5	0	—	—	15	0
Ventforet Kofu	2014	0	0	0	0	2	0	—	—	2	0
Zweigen Kanazawa	2014	11	2	0	0	–		–		11	2
Zweigen Kanazawa	2015	7	0	0	0	–		–		7	0
Zweigen Kanazawa	2016	25	4	2	1	–		–		27	5
Zweigen Kanazawa	2017	27	3	2	1	–		–		29	4
Zweigen Kanazawa	2018	20	5	1	0	–		–		21	5
Career total		99	14	6	2	7	0	0	0	112	16
