= Rikiya Motegi =

Japanese footballer (born 1996)

Rikiya Motegi 茂木 力也
Personal information
- Full name: Rikiya Motegi
- Date of birth: 27 September 1996 (age 30)
- Place of birth: Fukaya, Saitama, Japan
- Height: 1.74 m (5 ft 8 1/2 in)
- Position: Centre-back

Team information
- Current team: RB Omiya Ardija
- Number: 22

Youth career
- Konan Minami SSS
- Kumagaya SC
- –2014: Urawa Red Diamonds

Senior career*
Years	Team	Apps	(Gls)
2015–2019	Urawa Red Diamonds	1	(0)
2015	→ J. League U-22 (loan)	14	(1)
2016	→ Ehime FC (loan)	33	(0)
2017–2018	→ Montedio Yamagata (loan)	42	(1)
2019	→ Ehime FC (loan)	16	(0)
2020–2021	Ehime FC	81	(3)
2022–	RB Omiya Ardija	140	(8)

International career
2013	Japan U17	3	(0)
Medal record
Representing Japan
AFC U-16 Championship
Silver medal – second place	2012 Iran
- * Club domestic league appearances and goals as of 21:14, 10 June 2026 (UTC)

Rikiya Motegi (茂木 力也, Motegi Rikiya; born 27 September 1996) is a Japanese professional footballer who plays as a centre-back for J2 League club RB Omiya Ardija.

== International career ==
In October 2013, Motegi was elected to the Japan national under-17 team for the 2013 U-17 World Cup. He played 3 matches.

== Career statistics ==
As of match played 6 June 2026

Appearances and goals by club, season and competition
Club	Season	League			Emperor's Cup		J.League Cup		Other		Total	
Club	Season	Division	Apps	Goals	Apps	Goals	Apps	Goals	Apps	Goals	Apps	Goals
Urawa Red Diamonds	2015	J1 League	0	0	0	0	0	0	0	0	0	0
Urawa Red Diamonds	2018	J1 League	1	0	0	0	0	0	—		1	0
Urawa Red Diamonds	2019	J1 League	0	0	1	0	0	0	—		1	0
Urawa Red Diamonds	Total		1	0	1	0	0	0	—		2	0
J. League U-22 (loan)	2015	J3 League	14	1	—		—		—		14	1
Ehime FC (loan)	2016	J2 League	33	0	0	0	—		—		33	0
Montedio Yamagata (loan)	2017	J2 League	34	1	1	0	—		—		35	1
Montedio Yamagata (loan)	2018	J2 League	8	0	2	0	—		—		10	0
Montedio Yamagata (loan)	Total		42	1	3	0	0	0	—		45	1
Ehime FC (loan)	2019	J2 League	16	0	0	0	—		—		16	0
Ehime FC	2020	J2 League	40	2	0	0	—		—		40	2
Ehime FC	2021	J2 League	41	1	1	0	—		—		42	1
Ehime FC	Total		97	3	1	0	—		—		98	3
RB Omiya Ardija	2022	J2 League	33	1	0	0	—		—		33	1
RB Omiya Ardija	2023	J2 League	41	2	2	0	—		—		43	2
RB Omiya Ardija	2024	J3 League	27	5	1	0	0	0	—		28	5
RB Omiya Ardija	2025	J2 League	24	0	0	0	1	0	0	0	25	0
RB Omiya Ardija	2026	J2/J3	15	0	—		—		—		15	0
RB Omiya Ardija	Total		140	8	3	0	1	0	0	0	144	8
Career total			327	13	8	0	1	0	0	0	336	13

== Honours ==
RB Omiya Ardija

- J3 League: 2024
