= Yuki Oshitani =

Japanese footballer

Yuki Oshitani 押谷 祐樹
Personal information
- Full name: Yuki Oshitani
- Date of birth: 23 September 1989 (age 37)
- Place of birth: Hamamatsu, Shizuoka, Japan
- Height: 1.69 m (5 ft 7 in)
- Position: Striker

Team information
- Current team: Fukui United

Youth career
- 2002–2007: Júbilo Iwata

Senior career*
Years	Team	Apps	(Gls)
2008–2012	Júbilo Iwata	4	(0)
2009–2011	→ FC Gifu (loan)	77	(19)
2013–2016	Fagiano Okayama	140	(43)
2017–2018	Nagoya Grampus	23	(1)
2018–2020	Tokushima Vortis	38	(5)
2021–2022	Fujieda MYFC	44	(9)
2023–	Fukui United	0	(0)
- * Club domestic league appearances and goals as of 10 January 2023, 18:20 (UTC)

Yuki Oshitani (押谷 祐樹, Oshitani Yūki; born September 23, 1989 in Hamamatsu, Shizuoka) is a Japanese football player currently playing for Fukui United.

== Career ==
Oshitani signed transfer to J3 club, Fujieda MYFC in 15 January 2021.

On 11 January 2023, Oshitani announcement officially transfer to Fukui United for upcoming 2023 season.

== Career statistics ==
=== Club ===
Updated to the start from 2023 season.

Season	Club	League	League		Emperor's Cup		J. League Cup		Total	
Season	Club	League	Apps	Goals	Apps	Goals	Apps	Goals	Apps	Goals
2008	Júbilo Iwata	J1 League	0	0	0	0	0	0	0	0
2009	Júbilo Iwata	J1 League	0	0	0	0	1	0	1	0
2009	FC Gifu	J2 League	15	1	0	0	-		15	1
2010	FC Gifu	J2 League	29	9	1	0	-		30	9
2011	FC Gifu	J2 League	33	9	1	0	-		34	9
2012	Júbilo Iwata	J1 League	4	0	1	1	5	0	10	1
2013	Fagiano Okayama	J2 League	35	9	1	0	-		36	9
2014	Fagiano Okayama	J2 League	35	11	1	0	-		36	11
2015	Fagiano Okayama	J2 League	35	9	0	0	-		35	9
2016	Fagiano Okayama	J2 League	35	14	1	0	-		36	14
2017	Nagoya Grampus	J2 League	16	1	2	1	-		18	2
2018	Nagoya Grampus	J1 League	7	0	1	0	5	0	13	0
2018	Tokushima Vortis	J2 League	3	0	0	0	-		3	0
2019	Tokushima Vortis	J2 League	30	4	2	0	-		32	4
2020	Tokushima Vortis	J2 League	5	0	0	0	-		5	0
2021	Fujieda MYFC	J3 League	28	6	0	0	-		28	6
2022	Fujieda MYFC	J3 League	16	3	1	0	–		17	3
2023	Fukui United	Hokushinetsu Football League	0	0	0	0	-		0	0
Career total			327	76	13	2	11	0	351	78

== Honours ==
Tokushima Vortis

- J2 League: 2020
