= Ryuji Sugimoto =

Japanese footballer

Ryuji Sugimoto 杉本 竜士
Personal information
- Full name: Ryuji Sugimoto
- Date of birth: 1 June 1993 (age 33)
- Place of birth: Fuchū, Tokyo, Japan
- Height: 1.63 m (5 ft 4 in)
- Position: Midfielder

Team information
- Current team: Thespa Gunma
- Number: 11

Youth career
- 2006–2011: Tokyo Verdy

Senior career*
Years	Team	Apps	(Gls)
2011–2016	Tokyo Verdy	88	(8)
2013	→ FC Machida Zelvia (loan)	8	(3)
2017–2018	Nagoya Grampus	17	(2)
2018–2019	Tokushima Vortis	61	(4)
2020	Yokohama F. Marinos	0	(0)
2020	→ Yokohama FC	5	(0)
2021	Yokohama FC	6	(0)
2021–	Tokyo Verdy	46	(7)
2023	→ Thespakusatsu Gunma (loan)	0	(0)
- * Club domestic league appearances and goals as of 28 July 2023

Ryuji Sugimoto (杉本 竜士; born 1 June 1993) is a Japanese football player for Thespa Gunma.

== Career statistics ==
=== Club ===
As of 19 July 2022.

Appearances and goals by club, season and competition
Club	Season	League			National Cup		League Cup		Continental		Other		Total	
Club	Season	Division	Apps	Goals	Apps	Goals	Apps	Goals	Apps	Goals	Apps	Goals	Apps	Goals
Tokyo Verdy	2011	J2 League	1	0	0	0	–		–		–		1	0
Tokyo Verdy	2012	J2 League	3	0	0	0	–		–		–		3	0
Tokyo Verdy	2013	J2 League	2	0	0	0	–		–		–		2	0
Machida Zelvia	2013	JFL	8	3	0	0	–		–		–		8	3
Tokyo Verdy	2014	J2 League	16	4	0	0	–		–		–		16	4
Tokyo Verdy	2015	J2 League	37	3	1	0	–		–		–		38	3
Tokyo Verdy	2016	J2 League	29	1	1	0	–		–		–		30	1
Nagoya Grampus	2017	J2 League	17	2	2	0	–		–		0	0	19	2
Nagoya Grampus	2018	J1 League	0	0	0	0	0	0	–		–		0	0
Tokushima Vortis	2018	J2 League	27	0	2	0	–		–		–		29	0
Tokushima Vortis	2019	J2 League	33	4	0	0	–		–		2	0	35	4
Yokohama FC	2020	J1 League	5	0	–		0	0	–		–		5	0
Yokohama FC	2021	J1 League	6	0	1	0	4	0	–		–		11	0
Tokyo Verdy	2021	J2 League	19	1	0	0	–		–		–		19	1
Tokyo Verdy	2022	J2 League	23	6	1	0	–		–		–		24	6
Career total			226	24	8	0	4	0	0	0	2	0	240	24
