= 2018 Renofa Yamaguchi FC season =

Renofa Yamaguchi FC
2018 season
- Manager: Masahiro Shimoda
- Stadium: Ishin Me-Life Stadium
- J2 League: 8th

2018 Renofa Yamaguchi FC season.

== J2 League ==
Match	Date	Team	Score	Team	Venue	Attendance
1	2018.02.25	Renofa Yamaguchi FC	4-1	Roasso Kumamoto	Ishin Me-Life Stadium	7,456
2	2018.03.04	Renofa Yamaguchi FC	1-0	Ehime FC	Ishin Me-Life Stadium	5,095
3	2018.03.11	Tochigi SC	2-5	Renofa Yamaguchi FC	Tochigi Green Stadium	4,681
4	2018.03.17	Mito HollyHock	3-0	Renofa Yamaguchi FC	K's denki Stadium Mito	4,457
5	2018.03.21	Renofa Yamaguchi FC	2-2	Zweigen Kanazawa	Ishin Me-Life Stadium	3,508
6	2018.03.25	Renofa Yamaguchi FC	2-2	Matsumoto Yamaga FC	Ishin Me-Life Stadium	6,318
7	2018.03.31	Montedio Yamagata	0-1	Renofa Yamaguchi FC	ND Soft Stadium Yamagata	5,029
8	2018.04.07	Renofa Yamaguchi FC	2-1	Omiya Ardija	Ishin Me-Life Stadium	5,353
9	2018.04.14	Avispa Fukuoka	2-0	Renofa Yamaguchi FC	Level5 Stadium	6,837
10	2018.04.22	FC Machida Zelvia	1-2	Renofa Yamaguchi FC	Machida Stadium	3,535
11	2018.04.28	Renofa Yamaguchi FC	1-2	Albirex Niigata	Ishin Me-Life Stadium	6,374
12	2018.05.03	Ventforet Kofu	1-1	Renofa Yamaguchi FC	Yamanashi Chuo Bank Stadium	8,416
13	2018.05.06	Kyoto Sanga FC	1-2	Renofa Yamaguchi FC	Kyoto Nishikyogoku Athletic Stadium	7,093
14	2018.05.12	Renofa Yamaguchi FC	4-3	Tokyo Verdy	Ishin Me-Life Stadium	4,893
15	2018.05.20	Oita Trinita	2-2	Renofa Yamaguchi FC	Oita Bank Dome	11,862
16	2018.05.27	Renofa Yamaguchi FC	1-0	Kamatamare Sanuki	Shimonoseki Stadium	5,034
17	2018.06.02	JEF United Chiba	2-2	Renofa Yamaguchi FC	Fukuda Denshi Arena	9,787
18	2018.06.09	Renofa Yamaguchi FC	1-0	Fagiano Okayama	Ishin Me-Life Stadium	7,902
19	2018.06.16	Tokushima Vortis	1-2	Renofa Yamaguchi FC	Pocarisweat Stadium	4,828
20	2018.06.23	FC Gifu	2-2	Renofa Yamaguchi FC	Gifu Nagaragawa Stadium	8,317
21	2018.07.01	Renofa Yamaguchi FC	0-3	Yokohama FC	Ishin Me-Life Stadium	12,927
22	2018.07.07	Zweigen Kanazawa	2-2	Renofa Yamaguchi FC	Ishikawa Athletics Stadium	2,108
23	2018.07.15	Tokyo Verdy	3-1	Renofa Yamaguchi FC	Ajinomoto Stadium	5,712
24	2018.07.21	Renofa Yamaguchi FC	2-2	Mito HollyHock	Ishin Me-Life Stadium	4,909
25	2018.07.25	Roasso Kumamoto	2-2	Renofa Yamaguchi FC	Egao Kenko Stadium	3,576
27	2018.08.04	Ehime FC	2-0	Renofa Yamaguchi FC	Ningineer Stadium	3,370
28	2018.08.12	Renofa Yamaguchi FC	2-2	Tokushima Vortis	Ishin Me-Life Stadium	7,354
29	2018.08.18	Renofa Yamaguchi FC	1-2	Kyoto Sanga FC	Ishin Me-Life Stadium	6,060
30	2018.08.26	Omiya Ardija	4-4	Renofa Yamaguchi FC	NACK5 Stadium Omiya	9,232
31	2018.09.01	Renofa Yamaguchi FC	0-4	JEF United Chiba	Ishin Me-Life Stadium	4,499
32	2018.09.09	Renofa Yamaguchi FC	0-1	Montedio Yamagata	Ishin Me-Life Stadium	4,146
33	2018.09.15	Matsumoto Yamaga FC	0-0	Renofa Yamaguchi FC	Matsumotodaira Park Stadium	9,490
34	2018.09.22	Renofa Yamaguchi FC	1-3	Oita Trinita	Ishin Me-Life Stadium	8,189
35	2018.09.30	Yokohama FC	2-3	Renofa Yamaguchi FC	NHK Spring Mitsuzawa Football Stadium	3,051
36	2018.10.07	Renofa Yamaguchi FC	4-1	FC Gifu	Shimonoseki Stadium	3,936
37	2018.10.13	Renofa Yamaguchi FC	0-1	Avispa Fukuoka	Ishin Me-Life Stadium	7,015
26	2018.10.17	Renofa Yamaguchi FC	0-1	FC Machida Zelvia	Ishin Me-Life Stadium	3,133
38	2018.10.21	Kamatamare Sanuki	0-0	Renofa Yamaguchi FC	Pikara Stadium	3,280
39	2018.10.28	Renofa Yamaguchi FC	1-0	Tochigi SC	Ishin Me-Life Stadium	6,333
40	2018.11.04	Fagiano Okayama	0-1	Renofa Yamaguchi FC	City Light Stadium	8,467
41	2018.11.11	Renofa Yamaguchi FC	0-1	Ventforet Kofu	Ishin Me-Life Stadium	8,145
42	2018.11.17	Albirex Niigata	0-2	Renofa Yamaguchi FC	Denka Big Swan Stadium	16,054
