= Washington (footballer, born November 1986) =

Brazilian footballer

Personal information
- Full name: Cezar Washington Alves Portela
- Date of birth: 16 November 1986 (age 39)
- Place of birth: Recife, Brazil
- Height: 1.83 m (6 ft 0 in)
- Position: Midfielder

Team information
- Current team: Esportivo

Senior career*
Years	Team	Apps	(Gls)
2011	Canoas	14	(0)
2012	São José-PA	5	(0)
2012–2016	Brasil de Pelotas	114	(3)
2017–2018	Nagoya Grampus	35	(1)
2018	Renofa Yamaguchi	11	(0)
2019	Brasil de Pelotas	21	(1)
2020	Esportivo	6	(0)
2020	Freipaulistano	3	(0)
Total		207	(5)
- * Club domestic league appearances and goals

Cezar Washington Alves Portela (born 16 November 1986) is a Brazilian footballer who plays for Esportivo as a midfielder.

== Career ==
=== Club ===
Washington signed for Brasil de Pelotas in June 2012 to play in 2012 Campeonato Brasileiro Série D, having previously played in Campeonato Gaúcho with Canoas and São José-PA. After four seasons with the club, which saw two promotions, he joined Nagoya Grampus in the J2 League in November 2016. On 29 June 2018, Washington's contract with Nagoya Grampus was cancelled by mutual consent. After leaving Nagoya Grampus, Washington signed for Renofa Yamaguchi on 27 July 2018.

Washington returned to Brazil for a second spell with Brasil de Pelotas in 2019, making his debut at the end of January after a period waiting for his registration to be completed.

== Career statistics ==
=== Club ===
Appearances and goals by club, season and competition
Club	Season	League			State League		National Cup		League Cup		Continental		Other		Total	
Club	Season	Division	Apps	Goals	Apps	Goals	Apps	Goals	Apps	Goals	Apps	Goals	Apps	Goals	Apps	Goals
Canoas	2011	Gaúcho	—		14	0	—		—		—		—		14	0
São José-PA	2012	Gaúcho	—		5	0	—		—		—		—		5	0
Brasil de Pelotas	2012	Série D	5	0	—		—		—		—		—		5	0
Brasil de Pelotas	2013		—		2	0	—		—		—		—		2	0
Brasil de Pelotas	2014	Série D	15	1	14	0	0	0	—		—		—		29	1
Brasil de Pelotas	2015	Série C	20	2	11	0	1	0	—		—		—		32	2
Brasil de Pelotas	2016	Série B	34	0	13	0	1	0	—		—		—		48	0
Brasil de Pelotas	Total		74	3	40	0	4	0	—		—		—		118	3
Nagoya Grampus	2017	J2 League	29	1	—		2	1	—		—		2	0	33	2
Nagoya Grampus	2018	J1 League	6	0	—		1	0	5	0	—		—		12	0
Nagoya Grampus	Total		35	1	—		3	1	5	0	—		2	0	45	2
Renofa Yamaguchi	2018	J2 League	11	0	—		0	0	0	0	—		—		11	0
Brasil de Pelotas	2019	Série B	15	1	5	0	1	0	—		—		—		21	1
Esportivo	2020	Gaúcho	—		6	0	—		—		—		—		6	0
Freipaulistano	2020	Série D	3	0	—		—		—		—		—		3	0
Career total			137	5	70	0	8	1	5	0	0	0	2	0	222	6
