= Charles (footballer, born 1988) =

Brazilian footballer

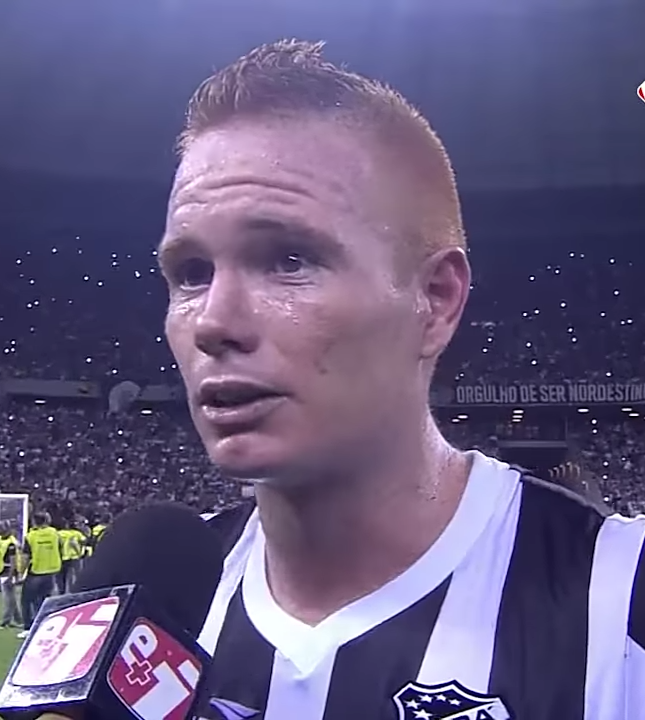

Personal information
- Full name: Charles Luis Reiter
- Date of birth: 26 April 1988 (age 38)
- Place of birth: Blumenau, Brazil
- Height: 1.88 m (6 ft 2 in)
- Position: Centre back

Senior career*
Years	Team	Apps	(Gls)
2008–2009	Campo Grande	21	(0)
2011–2012	Joinville	1	(0)
2012–2013	Juventus Jaraguá	7	(0)
2013	Fortaleza	23	(2)
2014	Paysandu	37	(1)
2015–2016	Ceará	73	(1)
2017	Nagoya Grampus	5	(0)
2017	Joinville	8	(0)
2018	Paraná	10	(0)
2019	Ceará	1	(0)
2020–2021	Joinville	21	(1)
- * Club domestic league appearances and goals as of 22:26, 23 December 2021 (UTC)

Charles Luis Reiter (born 26 April 1988), simply known as Charles, is a Brazilian footballer who plays as a central defender.

== Career ==
=== Club ===
On 30 November 2016, Charles signed for Nagoya Grampus in the J2 League, with his contract being terminated by mutual consent on 26 June 2017.

== Career statistics ==
=== Club ===
As of 28 November 2019

Club	Season	League			State League		National Cup		Continental		Other		Total	
Club	Season	Division	Apps	Goals	Apps	Goals	Apps	Goals	Apps	Goals	Apps	Goals	Apps	Goals
Campo Grande	2008	Carioca Série C	—		12	0	—		—		—		12	0
Campo Grande	2009	Carioca Série B	—		9	0	—		—		—		9	0
Campo Grande	Total		—		21	0	—		—		—		21	0
Joinville	2011	Série C	1	0	0	0	—		—		—		1	0
Joinville	2012	Série C	0	0	0	0	—		—		—		0	0
Joinville	Total		1	0	0	0	—		—		—		1	0
Juventus Jaraguá	2013	Catarinense	—		7	0	—		—		—		7	0
Fortaleza	2013	Série C	19	2	4	0	3	0	—		—		26	2
Paysandu	2014	Série C	19	1	18	0	6	1	—		7 (Note: Appearance(s) in Copa Verde)	1	50	3
Ceará	2015	Série B	22	1	16	0	6	0	—		10 (Note: Appearance(s) in Copa do Nordeste)	2	54	3
Ceará	2016	Série B	25	0	10	0	3	0	—		8	0	46	0
Ceará	Total		47	1	26	0	9	0	—		18	2	100	3
Nagoya Grampus	2017	J2 League	5	0	—		0	0	—		—		5	0
Joinville	2017	Série C	8	0	0	0	0	0	—		—		8	0
Paraná	2018	Série A	6	0	4	0	1	0	—		—		11	0
Ceará	2019	Série A	0	0	1	0	0	0	—		1	0	2	0
Career total			105	4	81	0	19	1	0	0	26	3	231	8
