= Ryota Matsumoto =

Japanese former footballer

Ryota Matsumoto 松本 怜大
Personal information
- Full name: Ryota Matsumoto
- Date of birth: 21 November 1990 (age 35)
- Place of birth: Iruma, Saitama, Japan
- Height: 1.75 m (5 ft 9 in)
- Position: Defender

Youth career
- 2009–2012: Toyo University

Senior career*
Years	Team	Apps	(Gls)
2013–2014	Consadole Sapporo	25	(1)
2015–2017	Machida Zelvia	92	(2)
2018–2022	Montedio Yamagata	100	(1)
- * Club domestic league appearances and goals as of 26 July 2022

Ryota Matsumoto (松本 怜大, Matsumoto Ryōta; born 21 November 1990) is a Japanese retired football player for Montedio Yamagata in the J2 League.

== Club statistics ==
Updated to 26 July 2022.

Club performance			League		Cup		Other		Total	
Season	Club	League	Apps	Goals	Apps	Goals	Apps	Goals	Apps	Goals
Japan			League		Emperor's Cup				Total	
2013	Consadole Sapporo	J2 League	20	1	3	0	–		23	1
2014	Consadole Sapporo	J2 League	5	0	1	0	–		6	0
2015	Machida Zelvia	J3 League	29	0	4	0	–		33	0
2016	Machida Zelvia	J2 League	30	1	0	0	–		30	1
2017	Machida Zelvia	J2 League	33	1	1	0	–		34	1
2018	Montedio Yamagata	J2 League	25	1	2	0	–		27	1
2019	Montedio Yamagata	J2 League	28	0	0	0	2	0	30	0
2020	Montedio Yamagata	J2 League	33	0	0	0	–		33	0
2021	Montedio Yamagata	J2 League	8	0	0	0	–		8	0
2022	Montedio Yamagata	J2 League	6	0	1	0	–		7	0
Total			217	4	12	0	2	0	231	4
