= Rikuya Izutsu =

Japanese footballer

Rikuya Izutsu 井筒 陸也
Personal information
- Full name: Rikuya Izutsu
- Date of birth: February 10, 1994 (age 32)
- Place of birth: Osaka, Japan
- Height: 1.79 m (5 ft 10 in)
- Position: Defender

Youth career
- 2009–2011: Hatsushiba Hashimoto; Senior High School
- 2012–2015: Kwansei Gakuin University

Senior career*
Years	Team	Apps	(Gls)
2016–2018	Tokushima Vortis	54	(2)
- * Club domestic league appearances and goals as of 7 January 2019

Rikuya Izutsu (井筒 陸也, Izutsu Rikuya; born February 10, 1994 in Osaka) is a former Japanese footballer.

== Club statistics ==
Updated to 23 February 2018.

Club performance			League		Cup		Total	
Season	Club	League	Apps	Goals	Apps	Goals	Apps	Goals
Japan			League		Emperor's Cup		Total	
2016	Tokushima Vortis	J2 League	0	0	2	0	2	0
2017	Tokushima Vortis	J2 League	21	1	0	0	21	1
Career total			21	1	2	0	23	1
