= 2016 Ehime FC season =

Ehime FC
2016 season
- Manager: Takashi Kiyama
- Stadium: Ningineer Stadium
- J2 League: 10th

2016 Ehime FC season.

== J2 League ==
=== League table ===
Pos	Team	Pld	W	D	L	GF	GA	GD	Pts
9	Tokushima Vortis	42	16	9	17	46	42	+4	57
10	Ehime FC	42	12	20	10	41	40	+1	56
11	JEF United Chiba	42	13	14	15	52	53	−1	53

Updated to match(es) played on 20 November 2016. Source: 2016 MEIJI YASUDA J2 LEAGUE League table
Rules for classification: 1) Points; 2) Goal difference; 3) Goals scored

=== Match details ===
J2 League match details
Match	Date	Team	Score	Team	Venue	Attendance
1	2016.02.28	Shimizu S-Pulse	0-0	Ehime FC	IAI Stadium Nihondaira	15,453
2	2016.03.06	Ehime FC	1-1	Montedio Yamagata	Ningineer Stadium	5,084
3	2016.03.13	Hokkaido Consadole Sapporo	1-1	Ehime FC	Sapporo Dome	20,012
4	2016.03.20	Ehime FC	0-3	FC Gifu	Ningineer Stadium	3,549
5	2016.03.26	Yokohama FC	0-0	Ehime FC	NHK Spring Mitsuzawa Football Stadium	2,523
6	2016.04.03	Ehime FC	2-1	Giravanz Kitakyushu	Ningineer Stadium	2,514
7	2016.04.09	Mito HollyHock	1-2	Ehime FC	K's denki Stadium Mito	4,070
9	2016.04.23	Ehime FC	1-0	Kamatamare Sanuki	Ningineer Stadium	4,323
10	2016.04.29	Ehime FC	0-0	Matsumoto Yamaga FC	Ningineer Stadium	4,235
12	2016.05.07	Ehime FC	0-0	Cerezo Osaka	Ningineer Stadium	7,740
13	2016.05.15	Ehime FC	0-1	Kyoto Sanga FC	Ningineer Stadium	3,841
8	2016.05.18	Zweigen Kanazawa	2-1	Ehime FC	Ishikawa Athletics Stadium	1,924
14	2016.05.22	Fagiano Okayama	2-1	Ehime FC	City Light Stadium	8,486
15	2016.05.29	Ehime FC	0-0	Tokyo Verdy	Ningineer Stadium	2,019
16	2016.06.04	Thespakusatsu Gunma	1-2	Ehime FC	Shoda Shoyu Stadium Gunma	4,085
17	2016.06.08	Renofa Yamaguchi FC	1-1	Ehime FC	Ishin Memorial Park Stadium	3,629
18	2016.06.12	Ehime FC	0-2	Tokushima Vortis	Ningineer Stadium	4,460
19	2016.06.19	FC Machida Zelvia	0-1	Ehime FC	Machida Stadium	3,481
20	2016.06.26	Ehime FC	0-1	V-Varen Nagasaki	Ningineer Stadium	2,670
21	2016.07.03	Ehime FC	2-1	JEF United Chiba	Ningineer Stadium	2,829
22	2016.07.10	Kamatamare Sanuki	1-1	Ehime FC	Pikara Stadium	4,539
23	2016.07.16	Ehime FC	2-2	Shimizu S-Pulse	Ningineer Stadium	4,897
24	2016.07.20	Ehime FC	1-1	Renofa Yamaguchi FC	Ningineer Stadium	2,835
25	2016.07.24	Tokushima Vortis	2-0	Ehime FC	Pocarisweat Stadium	8,962
26	2016.07.31	Ehime FC	1-0	Thespakusatsu Gunma	Ningineer Stadium	3,278
27	2016.08.07	JEF United Chiba	0-0	Ehime FC	Fukuda Denshi Arena	8,295
28	2016.08.11	Ehime FC	1-1	Fagiano Okayama	Ningineer Stadium	5,747
29	2016.08.14	Giravanz Kitakyushu	1-1	Ehime FC	Honjo Stadium	1,958
30	2016.08.21	V-Varen Nagasaki	1-1	Ehime FC	Transcosmos Stadium Nagasaki	4,850
11	2016.08.31	Roasso Kumamoto	1-2	Ehime FC	Umakana-Yokana Stadium	2,562
31	2016.09.11	Ehime FC	1-0	Roasso Kumamoto	Ningineer Stadium	2,955
32	2016.09.18	FC Gifu	2-1	Ehime FC	Gifu Nagaragawa Stadium	3,549
33	2016.09.25	Ehime FC	1-1	Mito HollyHock	Ningineer Stadium	2,342
34	2016.10.02	Ehime FC	3-0	Yokohama FC	Ningineer Stadium	8,215
35	2016.10.08	Montedio Yamagata	2-2	Ehime FC	ND Soft Stadium Yamagata	3,189
36	2016.10.16	Ehime FC	2-2	Hokkaido Consadole Sapporo	Ningineer Stadium	2,916
37	2016.10.23	Matsumoto Yamaga FC	1-1	Ehime FC	Matsumotodaira Park Stadium	13,605
38	2016.10.30	Tokyo Verdy	1-1	Ehime FC	Ajinomoto Stadium	6,931
39	2016.11.03	Ehime FC	3-1	Zweigen Kanazawa	Ningineer Stadium	4,895
40	2016.11.06	Cerezo Osaka	1-0	Ehime FC	Kincho Stadium	8,714
41	2016.11.12	Kyoto Sanga FC	0-1	Ehime FC	Kyoto Nishikyogoku Athletic Stadium	7,193
42	2016.11.20	Ehime FC	0-1	FC Machida Zelvia	Ningineer Stadium	4,519
