= 2018 J2 League =

Meiji Yasuda J2 League
- Season: 2018
- Champions: Matsumoto Yamaga
- Promoted: Matsumoto Yamaga; Oita Trinita
- Relegated: Roasso Kumamoto; Kamatamare Sanuki
- Matches: 462
- Goals: 1,143 (2.47 per match)
- Top goalscorer: Genki Omae; Omiya Ardija, 24 goals
- Highest attendance: 22,465; Niigata 1–1 Matsumoto (3 March)
- Lowest attendance: 1,510; Sanuki 1-1 Yamagata (19 September)
- Average attendance: 7,049

The 2018 Meiji Yasuda J2 League (2018 明治安田生命J2リーグ) season was the 47th season of the second-tier club football in Japan and the 20th season since the establishment of J2 League.

== Clubs ==
The participating clubs are listed in the following table:

Club name	Home town(s)	Note(s)
Albirex Niigata	Niigata & Seirō, Niigata	Relegated from J1
Omiya Ardija	Saitama	Relegated from J1
Avispa Fukuoka	Fukuoka City, Fukuoka	
Ehime FC	All cities/towns in Ehime (Note: centering on Matsuyama)	
Fagiano Okayama	All cities/towns in Okayama (Note: centering on Okayama, Kurashiki, Tsuyama)	
FC Gifu	All cities/towns in Gifu (Note: centering on Gifu)	
JEF United Chiba	Chiba & Ichihara, Chiba	
Kamatamare Sanuki	Takamatsu, Kagawa	
Kyoto Sanga	Southwestern cities/towns in Kyoto (Note: Kyoto, Uji, Joyo, Kyōtanabe, Mukō, Nagaokakyō, Kizugawa, Kameoka, Nantan, Kyotanba)	
Machida Zelvia	Machida, Tokyo	
Matsumoto Yamaga	Central cities/towns in Nagano (Note: Matsumoto, Nagano, Azumino, Yamagata, Shiojiri, Ōmachi, Ikeda)	
Mito HollyHock	Mito, Ibaraki	
Montedio Yamagata	All cities/towns in Yamagata (Note: centering on Yamagata, Tendō, Tsuruoka)	
Oita Trinita	Ōita	
Renofa Yamaguchi	All cities/towns in Yamaguchi (Note: centering on Yamaguchi, Shimonoseki, Sanyoonoda, Ube)	
Roasso Kumamoto	Kumamoto	
Tochigi SC	Utsunomiya, Tochigi	Promoted from J3
Tokushima Vortis	All cities/towns in Tokushima (Note: centering on Tokushima, Naruto, Mima, Matsushige, Itano, Aizumi, Kitajima)	
Ventforet Kofu	All Yamanashi Prefecture (Note: centering on Kofu and Nirasaki)	Relegated from J1
Tokyo Verdy	All cities/towns in Tokyo	
Yokohama FC	Yokohama, Kanagawa	
Zweigen Kanazawa	Kanazawa	

=== Personnel and kits ===
Club	Manager	Captain	Kit manufacturer
Albirex Niigata	(Japan) Masakazu Suzuki	(Japan) Ryota Isomura	(Germany) Adidas
Avispa Fukuoka	(Japan) Masami Ihara	(Japan) Hisashi Jogo	Yonex
Ehime FC	(Japan) Shuichi Mase	(Japan) Kazuhisa Kawahara	Mizuno
Fagiano Okayama	(Japan) Tetsu Nagasawa	(Japan) Kohei Kiyama	Penalty
FC Gifu	(Japan) Takeshi Oki	(Japan) Yuto Ono	New Balance
JEF United Chiba	(Argentina) Juan Esnáider	(Japan) Naoya Kondo	Kappa
Kamatamare Sanuki	(Japan) Makoto Kitano	(Japan) Kazumasa Takagi	ATHLETA
Kyoto Sanga	(Japan) Takanori Nunobe	(Japan) Yuta Someya	Wacoal
Machida Zelvia	(Japan) Naoki Soma	(North Korea) Ri Han-jae	SVOLME
Matsumoto Yamaga	(Japan) Yasuharu Sorimachi	(Japan) Masaki Iida	(Germany) Adidas
Mito HollyHock	(Japan) Shigetoshi Hasebe	(Japan) Junya Hosokawa	GAViC
Montedio Yamagata	(Japan) Takashi Kiyama	(Japan) Takumi Yamada	New Balance
Oita Trinita	(Japan) Tomohiro Katanosaka	(Japan) Akira Takeuchi	Puma
Omiya Ardija	(Japan) Masatada Ishii	(Japan) Kosuke Kikuchi	(United States) Under Armour
Renofa Yamaguchi	(Japan) Masahiro Shimoda	(Japan) Hidetoshi Miyuki	Finta
Roasso Kumamoto	(Japan) Hiroki Shibuya	(Japan) Akihiro Sato	Puma
Tochigi SC	(Japan) Yuji Yokoyama	(Japan) Koji Hirose	ATHLETA
Tokushima Vortis	(Spain) Ricardo Rodríguez	(Japan) Ken Iwao	(Japan) Mizuno
Tokyo Verdy	(Spain) Miguel Ángel Lotina	(Japan) Akira Ibayashi	ATHLETA
Ventforet Kofu	(Japan) Tatsuma Yoshida	(Japan) Hideomi Yamamoto	Mizuno
Yokohama FC	(Brazil) Edson Tavares	(Japan) Kensuke Sato	SOCCER JUNKY
Zweigen Kanazawa	(Japan) Masaaki Yanagishita	(Japan) Tomonobu Hiroi	(Germany) Adidas

=== Managerial changes ===
Team	Outgoing manager	Date of vacancy	Incoming manager	Date of appointment
Ventforet Kofu	(Japan) Tatsuma Yoshida	30 April 2018	(Japan) Nobuhiro Ueno	30 April 2018
Kyoto Sanga	(Japan) Takanori Nunobe	11 May 2018	(Serbia) Boško Gjurovski	11 May 2018
Ehime FC	(Japan) Shuichi Mase	15 May 2018	(Japan) Kenta Kawai	15 May 2018
Albirex Niigata	(Japan) Masakazu Suzuki	8 August 2018	(Japan) Koichiro Katafuchi	22 August 2018

== Foreign players ==
The total number of foreign players is restricted to five per club. Clubs can register up to four foreign players for a single match-day squad, of which a maximum of three are allowed from nations outside the Asian Football Confederation (AFC). Players from J.League partner nations (Thailand, Vietnam, Myanmar, Cambodia, Singapore, Indonesia, Iran, Malaysia, and Qatar) are exempt from these restrictions.

Club	Player 1	Player 2	Player 3	Player 4	Player 5	Other	Former
Albirex Niigata	(Brazil) Alex Muralha	(Brazil) Cauê	(Brazil) Jonathan Reis	(Brazil) Thalles	(South Korea) Song Ju-hun		(Brazil) Bruno Meneghel
Omiya Ardija	(Brazil) Marcelo Toscano	(Brazil) Mateus	(North Macedonia) David Babunski	(Sweden) Robin Simović	(South Korea) Kim Dong-su		(Brazil) Cauê
Avispa Fukuoka	(Brazil) Dudu	(Brazil) Léo Mineiro	(South Korea) Won Du-jae	(South Korea) Yu In-soo			(Brazil) Euller (Brazil) Túlio de Melo
Ehime FC	(South Korea) Park Seung-su					(South Korea) Woo Sang-ho	
Fagiano Okayama	(Brazil) Ricardo Santos	(South Korea) Choi Jung-won	(South Korea) Jeong Chung-geun	(South Korea) Lee Kyung-tae	(South Korea) Lee Yong-jae		
FC Gifu	(Argentina) Ezequiel Ham	(Brazil) Michael	(New Zealand) Ryan De Vries	(South Korea) Jeon San-hae	(Spain) Víctor Ibáñez		(South Korea) Woo Sang-ho
JEF United Chiba	(Argentina) Joaquín Larrivey	(Argentina) Diego Rodríguez	(Australia) Jason Geria	(Brazil) Hebert	(Paraguay) Jorge Salinas		
Kamatamare Sanuki	(Brazil) Alex	(South Korea) Park Chan-yong	(South Korea) Song Young-min				
Kyoto Sanga	(Brazil) Juninho	(Brazil) Kaio	(China) Wu Shaocong	(South Korea) Kim Cheol-ho	(Uruguay) Renzo López		(Uruguay) Matías Caseras (Brazil) Alexandre
Machida Zelvia	(North Macedonia) Dorian Babunski	(Peru) Romero Frank	(South Korea) Jung Han-cheol			(North Korea) Ri Han-jae	
Matsumoto Yamaga	(Brazil) Dinei	(Brazil) Paulinho	(Brazil) Serginho	(South Korea) Goh Dong-min	(South Korea) Jo Jin-woo	(Singapore) Anders Aplin	
Mito HollyHock	(Brazil) Batista	(Brazil) Diego	(Brazil) Jefferson Baiano	(Costa Rica) Danny Carvajal			
Montedio Yamagata	(Brazil) Álvaro	(Brazil) Bruno Lopes	(Brazil) Felipe Alves	(Brazil) Jairo			
Oita Trinita	(Brazil) Willian	(South Korea) Mun Kyung-gun				(North Korea) Hwang Song-su	(South Korea) Lim Seung-gyeom
Renofa Yamaguchi	(Brazil) Julinho	(Brazil) Renan	(Brazil) Washington				(Brazil) Gerson (South Korea) Min Kyung-jun
Roasso Kumamoto	(South Korea) Lim Jin-woo	(South Korea) Yang Sang-jun				(North Korea) An Byong-jun	
Tochigi SC	(Brazil) Alex	(Brazil) Paulao	(Brazil) Henik	(Brazil) Mendes	(Switzerland) Johnny Leoni		(Australia) Diogo Ferreira (Slovenia) Nejc Pečnik
Tokushima Vortis	(Brazil) Bueno	(Nigeria) Peter Utaka	(South Korea) Kim Jong-pil	(Spain) David Barral	(Spain) Sisinio		(Brazil) Nathan Júnior (Costa Rica) Danny Carvajal
Ventforet Kofu	(Brazil) Diego	(Brazil) Éder Lima	(Brazil) Ferrugem	(Brazil) Junior Barros	(South Korea) Byeon Jun-byum		(Brazil) Dinei (Brazil) Lins
Tokyo Verdy	(Brazil) Alan Pinheiro	(Brazil) Douglas	(Brazil) Leandro			(North Korea) Ri Yong-jik	(Spain) Carlos Martínez
Yokohama FC	(Brazil) Bruno Meneghel	(Brazil) Leandro Domingues	(Netherlands) Calvin Jong-a-Pin	(Norway) Ibba Laajab	(South Korea) Bae Seung-jin		(South Korea) Jeong Chung-geun
Zweigen Kanazawa	(Brazil) Allan	(Brazil) Rodrigo Maranhão					

== League table ==
Pos	Team	Pld	W	D	L	GF	GA	GD	Pts	Promotion, qualification or relegation
1	Matsumoto Yamaga (C, P)	42	21	14	7	54	34	+20	77	Promotion to 2019 J1 League
2	Oita Trinita (P)	42	23	7	12	76	51	+25	76	Promotion to 2019 J1 League
3	Yokohama FC	42	21	13	8	63	44	+19	76	Qualification for promotion play-offs (Note: Only teams that meet J1 license criteria can participate in promotion play-offs. If one or more teams fail to meet the criteria, only eligible teams that finished 3rd to 6th will participate and no replacement teams will be added.)
4	Machida Zelvia	42	21	13	8	62	44	+18	76	Ineligible for promotion play-offs
5	Omiya Ardija	42	21	8	13	65	48	+17	71	Qualification for promotion play-offs
6	Tokyo Verdy	42	19	14	9	56	41	+15	71	Qualification for promotion play-offs
7	Avispa Fukuoka	42	19	13	10	58	42	+16	70	
8	Renofa Yamaguchi	42	16	13	13	63	64	−1	61	
9	Ventforet Kofu	42	16	11	15	56	46	+10	59	
10	Mito HollyHock	42	16	9	17	48	46	+2	57	
11	Tokushima Vortis	42	16	8	18	48	42	+6	56	
12	Montedio Yamagata	42	14	14	14	49	51	−2	56	
13	Zweigen Kanazawa	42	14	13	15	52	48	+4	55	
14	JEF United Chiba	42	16	7	19	72	72	0	55	
15	Fagiano Okayama	42	14	11	17	39	43	−4	53	
16	Albirex Niigata	42	15	8	19	48	56	−8	53	
17	Tochigi SC	42	13	11	18	38	48	−10	50	
18	Ehime FC	42	12	12	18	34	52	−18	48	
19	Kyoto Sanga	42	12	7	23	40	58	−18	43	
20	FC Gifu	42	11	9	22	44	62	−18	42	
21	Roasso Kumamoto (R)	42	9	7	26	50	79	−29	34	Relegation to 2019 J3 League (Note: Direct exchange between J2 and J3 is subject to eligibility of J2-licensed teams in top 2 of 2018 J3 League.)
22	Kamatamare Sanuki (R)	42	7	10	25	28	72	−44	31	Relegation to 2019 J3 League

Source: 2018 MEIJI YASUDA J2 LEAGUE League table
Rules for classification: 1) Points; 2) Goal difference; 3) Goals scored
(C) Champions; (P) Promoted; (R) Relegated

== Results ==
Home \ Away	ALB	ARD	AVI	EHI	FAG	GIF	HOL	JEF	KAM	MON	REN	ROS	SAN	TOC	TRI	VEN	VER	VOR	YAM	YFC	ZEL	ZWE
Albirex Niigata		0–1	0–3	0–1	0–1	5–0	1–1	1–2	2–1	0–0	0–2	2–3	1–1	0–3	1–2	1–5	1–2	1–0	1–1	0–1	2–0	2–1
Omiya Ardija	2–1		2–1	1–1	1–1	0–2	2–1	0–1	2–2	2–1	4–4	2–1	1–2	1–0	1–0	2–1	2–0	0–1	1–2	4–0	1–0	1–1
Avispa Fukuoka	0–2	3–1		2–0	1–1	2–0	2–0	3–1	3–1	2–1	2–0	1–0	2–2	2–1	1–0	0–2	0–0	1–0	0–1	0–0	2–2	2–2
Ehime FC	0–0	2–3	1–5		2–0	1–3	0–1	1–0	0–0	0–2	2–0	1–2	1–2	1–1	1–0	0–0	2–2	1–0	1–1	0–2	0–2	1–2
Fagiano Okayama	1–2	0–1	2–2	0–1		0–0	0–1	0–2	3–0	2–2	0–1	3–1	2–2	3–0	1–0	1–0	0–1	2–1	0–0	0–0	1–0	3–3
FC Gifu	2–1	0–1	0–0	1–2	2–1		4–0	2–0	2–3	0–1	2–2	0–2	2–3	1–1	0–2	3–4	1–1	0–0	2–0	0–1	0–1	0–1
Mito HollyHock	0–1	0–2	1–2	4–1	3–0	1–1		1–0	5–0	3–0	3–0	3–2	1–2	0–0	1–2	0–1	2–0	0–1	1–1	0–0	0–1	1–0
JEF United Chiba	1–2	1–3	3–3	2–1	1–0	2–3	0–0		6–1	2–1	2–2	3–1	2–0	0–0	2–4	2–1	2–3	2–0	2–3	0–1	3–2	3–4
Kamatamare Sanuki	0–1	0–2	1–1	1–1	0–1	1–0	1–2	2–1		1–1	0–0	1–0	0–2	1–2	1–2	0–3	3–1	0–4	0–1	1–2	1–1	0–2
Montedio Yamagata	1–2	1–1	2–2	1–1	1–0	2–0	0–1	2–1	2–0		0–1	2–1	1–1	3–3	1–1	2–1	0–1	1–0	3–2	2–3	2–2	2–1
Renofa Yamaguchi	1–2	2–1	0–1	1–0	1–0	4–1	2–2	0–4	1–0	0–1		4–1	1–2	1–0	1–3	0–1	4–3	2–2	2–2	0–3	0–1	2–2
Roasso Kumamoto	3–1	2–1	0–1	3–0	0–0	1–2	2–1	1–3	1–1	1–2	2–2		0–4	0–1	1–3	1–4	0–0	2–1	1–3	3–5	2–3	0–1
Kyoto Sanga	0–3	0–2	1–0	0–1	0–1	2–1	0–1	0–3	1–1	1–0	1–2	1–2		0–2	0–1	1–1	0–1	0–1	0–2	1–0	0–2	0–0
Tochigi SC	2–1	0–1	1–0	1–3	0–1	4–1	1–2	0–1	1–0	1–0	2–5	1–0	3–1		2–4	0–1	2–2	1–1	0–1	0–0	0–0	1–1
Oita Trinita	4–0	1–2	1–0	0–1	4–1	2–1	3–1	4–0	5–0	2–2	2–2	2–0	2–1	0–0		2–4	0–0	0–1	1–0	1–1	4–3	2–1
Ventforet Kofu	0–0	1–0	1–2	0–1	2–0	1–3	1–1	1–1	1–0	1–2	1–1	3–2	1–1	2–1	6–2		0–0	0–1	0–1	0–1	0–2	1–3
Tokyo Verdy	4–3	2–1	1–1	0–0	0–1	0–0	3–0	2–1	1–0	0–0	3–1	2–2	3–1	3–0	0–0	0–1		2–1	2–1	2–1	1–4	0–1
Tokushima Vortis	0–0	2–1	3–1	2–0	0–1	2–1	1–0	4–1	0–1	5–1	1–2	1–0	1–0	4–1	3–0	0–1	0–4		1–1	0–1	1–2	0–3
Matsumoto Yamaga	2–0	3–2	1–0	0–0	1–1	0–0	2–0	4–2	1–1	1–0	0–0	2–0	1–0	1–0	1–4	0–0	1–0	1–0		1–3	0–1	5–0
Yokohama FC	0–3	2–2	3–0	2–1	3–0	2–0	2–3	4–2	3–1	3–1	1–0	1–1	1–2	0–0	1–1	3–3	2–2	1–0	0–0		2–3	0–4
Machida Zelvia	0–0	3–2	2–1	2–1	1–3	1–0	0–0	3–3	3–0	0–0	1–2	2–2	2–1	0–1	3–2	0–0	1–1	1–1	2–1	1–0		1–0
Zweigen Kanazawa	2–3	1–1	0–1	0–0	0–1	2–0	3–1	3–1	0–1	1–0	2–2	0–0	1–3	2–0	0–1	1–2	0–1	0–0	0–2	0–0	1–1	

Updated to match(es) played on 17 November 2018. Source: J.League Data
Legend: Blue = home team win; Yellow = draw; Red = away team win.

== Promotion–Relegation Playoffs ==
2018 J.League J1/J2 Play-Offs (2018 J1参入プレーオフ)
Because Machida Zelvia did not own a J1 license for the 2019 season, they were ineligible to participate in the play-offs. Thus, Yokohama FC, finishing third in the season, received a bye into the second round, from which the winner will play the team finishing 16th in J1.

1st Semi-Final
J2 (5)	Omiya Ardija	0
J2 (6)	Tokyo Verdy	1

2nd Semi-Final
J2 (3)	Yokohama FC	0
J2 (6)	Tokyo Verdy	1

Final
J1 (16)	Júbilo Iwata	2
J2 (6)	Tokyo Verdy	0

=== First Semi-Final ===
25 November 2018
13:00

Omiya Ardija	0–1	Tokyo Verdy
		Taira 71'

NACK5 Stadium Omiya, Saitama
Attendance: 11,858
Referee: Hiroyoshi Takayama

=== Second Semi-Final ===
2 December 2018
13:00

Yokohama FC	0–1	Tokyo Verdy
		Douglas Vieira 90+7'

Mitsuzawa Stadium, Yokohama
Attendance: 12,625
Referee: Hajime Matsuo

=== Final ===
8 December 2018
14:00

Júbilo Iwata	2–0	Tokyo Verdy
K. Ogawa 41' (pen.); Taguchi 80'	Report

Yamaha Stadium, Iwata
Attendance: 14,588

Júbilo Iwata remains in J1 League.
Tokyo Verdy remains in J2 League.

== Top scorers ==
As of matches played 17 November 2018.

Rank	Player	Club	Goals
1	(Japan) Genki Omae	Omiya Ardija	24
2	(Japan) Ado Onaiwu	Renofa Yamaguchi	22
3	(Japan) Takayuki Funayama	JEF United Chiba	19
4	(Norway) Ibba	Yokohama FC	17
5	(Brazil) Douglas Vieira	Tokyo Verdy	13
6	(Japan) Masashi Oguro	Tochigi SC	12
6	(Japan) Seigo Kobayashi	Renofa Yamaguchi	12
6	(Japan) Yuki Nakashima	Machida Zelvia	12
6	(Brazil) Mateus	Omiya Ardija	12
6	(Japan) Kenji Baba	Oita Trinita	12
6	(Japan) Noriaki Fujimoto	Oita Trinita	12

== Attendances ==
Pos	Team	Total	High	Low	Average	Change
1	Albirex Niigata	313,080	22,465	8,614	14,913	−32.3%^{†}
2	Matsumoto Yamaga	278,948	19,066	9,490	13,283	−21.0%
3	JEF United Chiba	207,025	12,440	6,152	9,858	−1.3%
4	Omiya Ardija	193,711	12,400	6,506	9,224	−19.5%^{†}
5	Oita Trinita	187,052	15,125	4,880	8,907	+10.5%
6	Avispa Fukuoka	186,323	15,331	6,684	8,873	−7.1%
7	Fagiano Okayama	180,586	13,851	5,034	8,599	−9.2%
8	Ventforet Kofu	155,054	10,192	3,130	7,384	−31.9%^{†}
9	FC Gifu	144,011	12,045	3,819	6,858	−1.7%
10	Montedio Yamagata	142,094	13,609	4,675	6,766	+2.8%
11	Yokohama FC	128,959	10,978	3,051	6,141	+2.9%
12	Renofa Yamaguchi	128,579	12,927	3,133	6,123	+12.3%
13	Tokyo Verdy	124,654	10,529	3,048	5,936	−4.4%
14	Kyoto Sanga	118,931	9,036	2,624	5,663	−16.1%
15	Tochigi SC	118,805	11,562	3,203	5,657	+9.9%^{‡}
16	Roasso Kumamoto	110,643	10,226	3,206	5,269	−19.6%
17	Tokushima Vortis	104,941	8,753	2,974	4,997	+0.4%
18	Mito HollyHock	103,698	7,858	2,736	4,938	+0.1%
19	Machida Zelvia	103,215	10,013	2,414	4,915	+21.2%
20	Zweigen Kanazawa	95,093	9,645	2,108	4,528	+3.0%
21	Ehime FC	66,382	5,319	2,196	3,161	−18.2%
22	Kamatamare Sanuki	64,532	5,668	1,510	3,073	−19.2%
	League total	3,256,416	22,465	1,510	7,049	+1.1%

Updated to games played on 17 November 2018
Source: J. League Data
Notes:
^{†} Relegated from J1.^{‡} Promoted from J3.
