= Ehime Women's College =

Private women's junior college in Uwajima, Ehime, Japan

Coordinates: 33°14′08″N 132°34′23″E

International Pacific University Women's College (環太平洋大学短期大学部, Kan-taiheiyou daigaku tanki daigakubu) is a private women's junior college in Uwajima, Ehime, Japan, established in 1966.
