= Taishi Taguchi =

Japanese footballer (born 1991)

Taishi Taguchi 田口 泰士
Personal information
- Full name: Taishi Taguchi
- Date of birth: 16 March 1991 (age 35)
- Place of birth: Naha, Okinawa, Japan
- Height: 1.74 m (5 ft 8 1/2 in)
- Position: Midfielder

Team information
- Current team: JEF United Chiba
- Number: 4

Youth career
- 2006–2008: RKU Kashiwa High School

Senior career*
| Years | Team | Apps | (Gls) |
| 2009–2017 | Nagoya Grampus | 155 | (16) |
| 2018–2019 | Júbilo Iwata | 54 | (4) |
| 2020– | JEF United Chiba | 191 | (12) |

International career
| 2014 | Japan | 3 | (0) |
Medal record
Nagoya Grampus
| Winner | J1 League | 2010 |
| Runner-up | J1 League | 2011 |
| Runner-up | Emperor's Cup | 2009 |
- * Club domestic league appearances and goals as of 12 August 2026

Taishi Taguchi (田口 泰士, Taguchi Taishi; born 16 March 1991) is a Japanese football player currently playing for JEF United Chiba.

== Club statistics ==
Updated to 15 January 2021.

| Club | Season | League | | Cup^{1} | | League Cup^{2} | | Continental^{3} | | Total | |
| Club | Season | Apps | Goals | Apps | Goals | Apps | Goals | Apps | Goals | Apps | Goals |
|---|---|---|---|---|---|---|---|---|---|---|---|
| Nagoya Grampus | 2009 | 1 | 0 | 1 | 0 | 1 | 0 | 1 | 0 | 4 | 0 |
| Nagoya Grampus | 2010 | 0 | 0 | 3 | 0 | 2 | 0 | – | | 5 | 0 |
| Nagoya Grampus | 2011 | 3 | 0 | 2 | 1 | 0 | 0 | 0 | 0 | 5 | 1 |
| Nagoya Grampus | 2012 | 25 | 2 | 4 | 0 | 2 | 0 | 3 | 0 | 34 | 2 |
| Nagoya Grampus | 2013 | 25 | 0 | 1 | 0 | 4 | 0 | – | | 30 | 0 |
| Nagoya Grampus | 2014 | 29 | 1 | 3 | 0 | 6 | 0 | – | | 38 | 1 |
| Nagoya Grampus | 2015 | 11 | 2 | 1 | 0 | 2 | 0 | – | | 14 | 2 |
| Nagoya Grampus | 2016 | 27 | 2 | 1 | 0 | 3 | 0 | – | | 31 | 2 |
| Nagoya Grampus | 2017 | 34 | 9 | 2 | 0 | – | | – | | 36 | 9 |
| Júbilo Iwata | 2018 | 33 | 4 | 1 | 0 | 2 | 0 | – | | 36 | 4 |
| Júbilo Iwata | 2019 | 21 | 0 | 1 | 0 | – | | – | | 22 | 0 |
| JEF United Chiba | 2020 | 31 | 2 | – | | – | | – | | 31 | 2 |
| Total | | 240 | 22 | 20 | 1 | 22 | 0 | 4 | 0 | 286 | 23 |

^{1}Includes Emperor's Cup.

^{2}Includes J. League Cup.

^{3}Includes AFC Champions League.

== National team statistics ==
Japan national team
| Year | Apps | Goals |
|---|---|---|
| 2014 | 3 | 0 |
| Total | 3 | 0 |

== Honours ==
Individual

- J2 League Best XI: 2023
