= Masahiro Shimoda =

Japanese footballer and manager

Masahiro Shimoda 霜田 正浩
Personal information
- Full name: Masahiro Shimoda
- Date of birth: 10 February 1967 (age 59)
- Place of birth: Toshima, Tokyo, Japan
- Height: 1.70 m (5 ft 7 in)
- Position: Midfielder

Youth career
- 1982–1984: Takashima High School

Senior career*
Years	Team	Apps	(Gls)
1988–1989	Shonan Bellmare		
1990–1992	Kyoto Shiko		
1993	Yokogawa Electric		

Managerial career
- 2006: YSCC Yokohama
- 2013: Japan U-23
- 2018–2020: Renofa Yamaguchi FC
- 2021: Saigon
- 2021–2022: Omiya Ardija
- 2023–2024: Matsumoto Yamaga
Medal record
Shonan Bellmare
Runner-up	Emperor's Cup	1988
- * Club domestic league appearances and goals

Masahiro Shimoda (霜田 正浩, Shimoda Masahiro; born February 10, 1967) is a Japanese former football player and current manager of Matsumoto Yamaga.

== Club career ==
Shimoda was born in Toshima, Tokyo on February 10, 1967. After three years at Takashima High School, he opted for a trip away from Japan. He studied in Brazil, played in the youth ranks of Santos, where he met Kazuyoshi Miura and César Sampaio. He returned to Japan and played in the old Japan Soccer League, but he retired at only 27 years old.

== Managerial career ==
Shimoda tried to have a career in the coaching world, managing the youth side at Kyoto Purple Sanga, but he was also the men behind the return of Miura to Japan in 1999, when the striker opted to sign for Sanga from Dinamo Zagreb. He was as well behind some FC Tokyo's football operations concerning the acquisition of foreign players in the early 2000s. After getting a coach patent, he managed YSCC Yokohama for a couple of months. He also managed the reserves of JEF United Chiba, but in the end Japan Football Association asked him in 2009 to be in the Technical Committee through a direct request from their chairman, Hiromi Hara. Shimoda accepted and he stayed in charge as a scout for seven years, also briefly managing the Japan U-23 national team in 2013.

In 2017, he was also the reserve head coach at Sint-Truidense, in Belgium. He went back to Japan in 2018, when he accepted the offer of Renofa Yamaguchi FC to be the next head coach.

In June 2021, he became the manager of Omiya Ardija. On 26 May 2022, He was fired from manager after worst performance at J2 League after Matchweek 18.

On 5 December 2022, Shimoda announcement manager of Matsumoto Yamaga from 2023 replace Nanami after expiration contract.

== Managerial statistics ==
Update; start of the 2023 season

Team	From	To	Record				
Team	From	To	G	W	D	L	Win %
Renofa Yamaguchi FC	1 February 2018	31 January 2020	130	40	27	63	30.77
Saigon FC	24 February 2021	30 March 2021	3	0	0	3	0.00
Omiya Ardija	9 June 2021	26 May 2022	43	11	15	17	25.58
Matsumoto Yamaga	5 December 2022	present	—	−	−	–	—
Total			176	51	42	83	28.98
