= Lim Seung-gyeom =

South Korean footballer (born 1995)

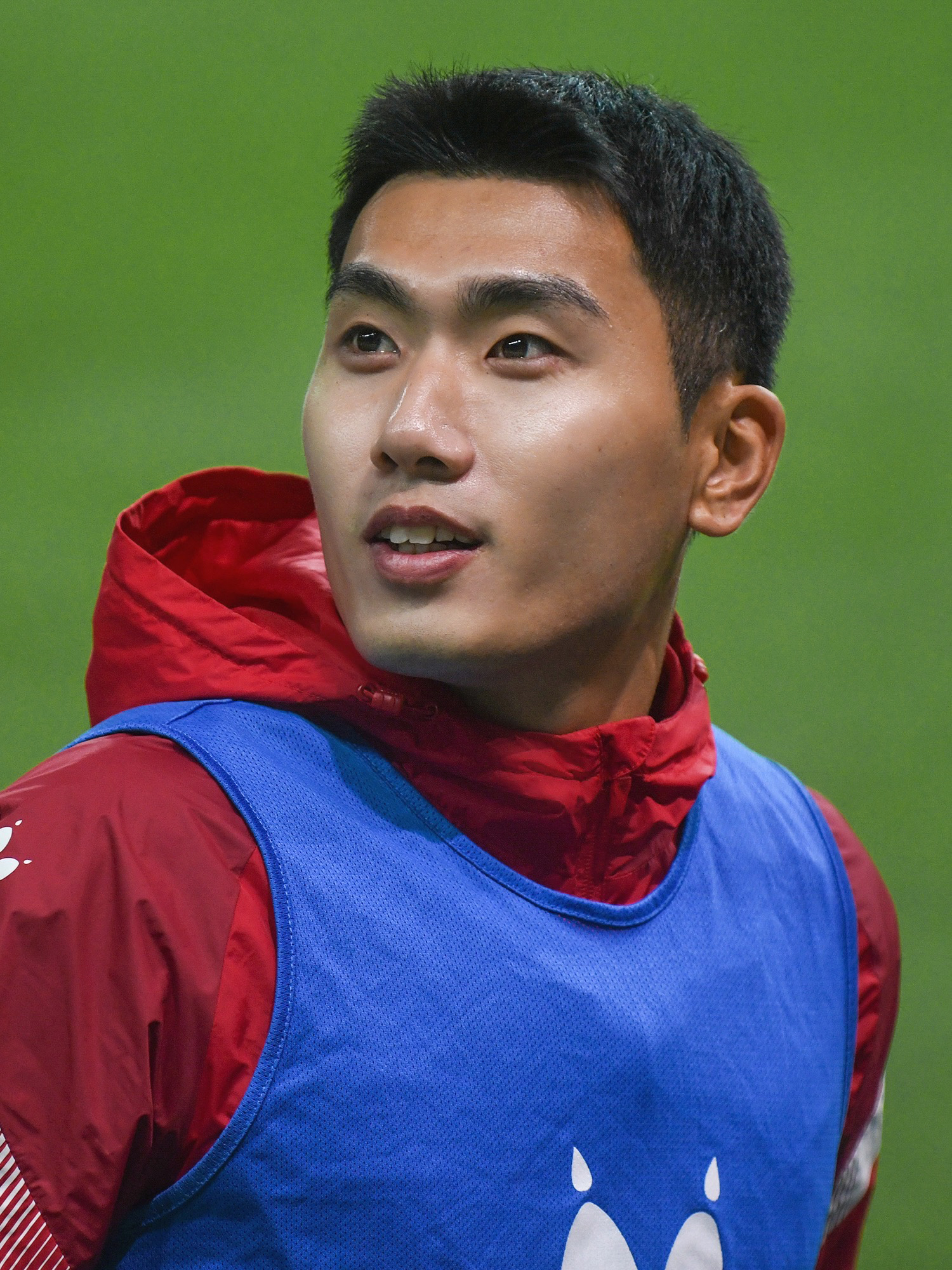
- Lim in October 2022

Personal information
- Date of birth: April 26, 1995 (age 31)
- Place of birth: South Korea
- Height: 1.85 m (6 ft 1 in)
- Position: Forward

Team information
- Current team: FC Anyang
- Number: 77

Senior career*
Years	Team	Apps	(Gls)
2017–2018	Nagoya Grampus	14	(1)
2018	Oita Trinita	0	(0)
2018	Mokpo City	9	(1)
2019–2020	Seongnam FC	36	(0)
2021–	FC Anyang	19	(0)
2022–2023	Gimcheon Sangmu (Army)	24	(0)
- * Club domestic league appearances and goals as of 5 January 2026

Lim Seung-gyeom (Korean: 임승겸; born April 26, 1995) is a South Korean football player who plays for FC Anyang.

== Career ==
Lim Seung-gyeom joined J2 League club Nagoya Grampus in 2017.

On 12 July 2018, Lim signed for Mokpo City after cutting short his loan deal at Oita Trinita.
