= Shuichi Mase =

Japanese footballer and manager

Shuichi Mase 間瀬 秀一
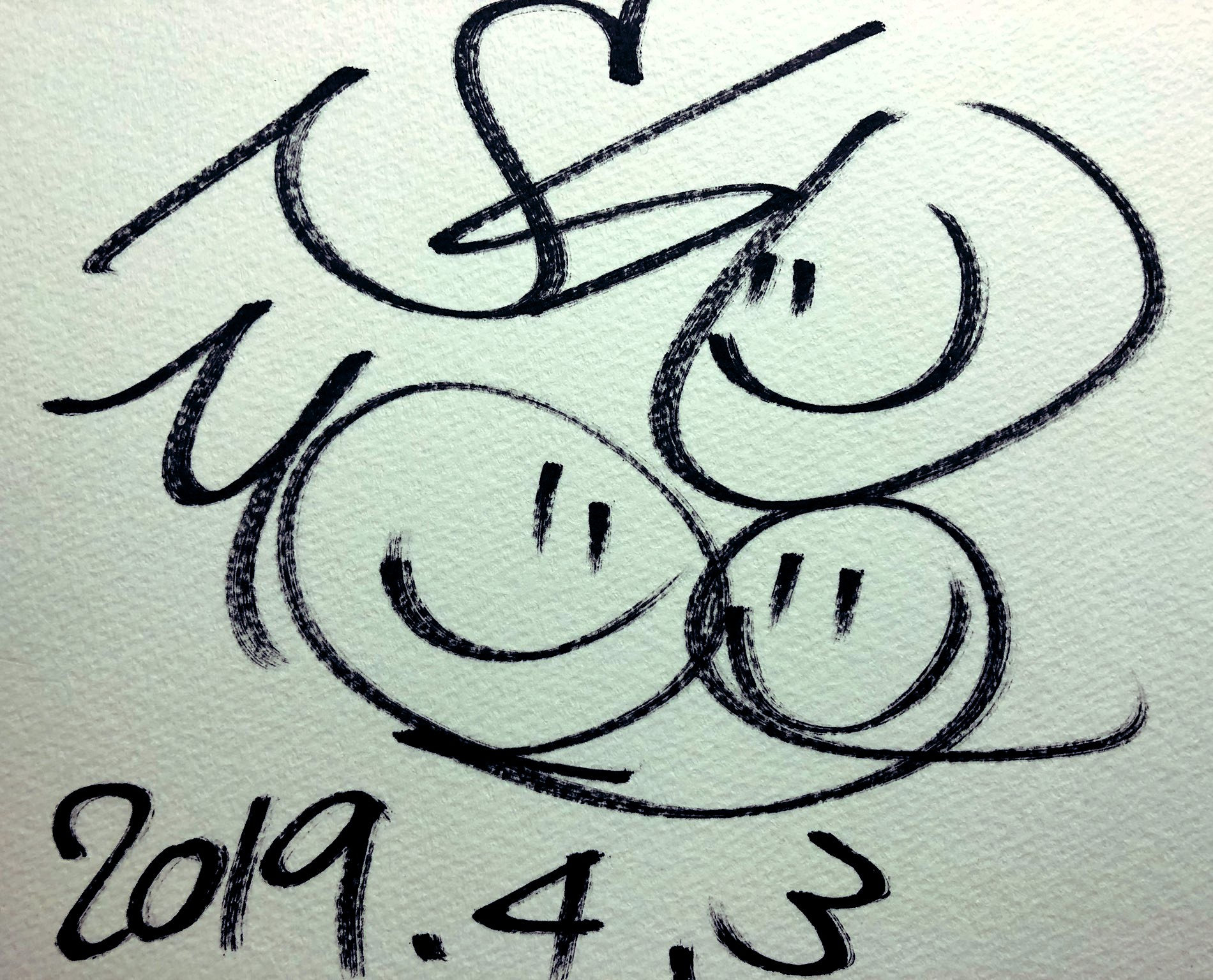
- Autograph in 2019

Personal information
- Full name: Shuichi Mase
- Date of birth: 22 October 1973 (age 53)
- Place of birth: Yokkaichi, Mie, Japan
- Height: 1.70 m (5 ft 7 in)
- Position: Forward

Team information
- Current team: Veertien Mie (manager)

Youth career
- 1989–1991: Akatsuki High School

College career
Years	Team	Apps	(Gls)
1992–1995	Nippon Sport Science University		

Senior career*
Years	Team	Apps	(Gls)
1997	San Fernando Valley Golden Eagles	12	(2)
1998	Sidekicks		
1999	Deportivo Amatitlán	11	(2)
1999	Deportivo Mictlán	5	(2)
2000	C.D. San Luis	4	(3)
2000	NK Špansko	4	
2000	NK Slavonac CO	11	(8)
2000	NK Novalja	17	(10)
2000	NK Trnje	12	(4)
Total		76	(31)

Managerial career
- 2015–2016: Blaublitz Akita
- 2017–2018: Ehime FC
- 2018–2019: Blaublitz Akita
- 2021: Mongolia U-23
- 2021: Mongolia
- 2022-2023: Wyvern FC
- 2024–: Veertien Mie
- * Club domestic league appearances and goals

Shuichi Mase (間瀬 秀一, Mase Shūichi; born October 22, 1973) is a Japanese football manager and former player. He currently manager of Japan Football League club, Veertien Mie.

== Playing career ==
Mase was born in Mie Prefecture on October 22, 1973. After graduating from Nippon Sport Science University, he had a brief field career from 1997 to 2000, being in North-Central American teams and living a certain period in Croatia.

== Coaching career ==
After being translator for Ivica Osim and his son Amar Osim during his spell as JEF United Chiba's coach until 2007, Mase became a coach at the club. Form 2010, he became a coach at Fagiano Okayama (2010-2012) and Tokyo Verdy (2013). In January 2015, he became the manager at Blaublitz Akita, as his mother is from Oga, Akita. In 2017, he moved to Ehime FC. However the club results were bad in 2018 season, he was sacked by Ehime FC on May when the club was at the 20th place of 22 clubs. In July 2018, he signed with former club Blaublitz Akita and became a manager for the first time in 2 years.

In 2022, Mase was appointment manager of Wyvern FC.

In 2024, Mase was appointment manager of JFL club, Veertien Mie.

== Managerial statistics ==
Update; June 30, 2020

Team	From	To	Record				
Team	From	To	G	W	D	L	Win %
Blaublitz Akita	2015	2016	66	26	17	23	39.39
Ehime FC	2017	2018	56	16	13	27	28.57
Blaublitz Akita	2018	2019	50	19	14	17	38.00
Total			172	61	44	67	35.47
