= List of J3 League football transfers summer 2018 =

This is a list of Japanese football J3 League transfers in the summer transfer window 2018 by club.

== Thespakusatsu Gunma ==
In: Note: Flags indicate national team as defined under FIFA eligibility rules; some limited exceptions apply. Players may hold more than one non-FIFA nationality.

No.	Pos.	Nation	Player
24	MF	JPN	Justin Toshiki Kinjo (from (Germany) Fortuna Düsseldorf)
28	DF	JPN	Takumi Hasegawa (on loan from (Japan) Albirex Niigata)
33	MF	JPN	Teppei Usui (on loan from (Japan) V-Varen Nagasaki)
40	DF	JPN	Tatsushi Koyanagi (on loan from (Japan) Zweigen Kanazawa)
50	FW	JPN	Masato Yamazaki (on loan from (Japan) Zweigen Kanazawa)

Out: Note: Flags indicate national team as defined under FIFA eligibility rules; some limited exceptions apply. Players may hold more than one non-FIFA nationality.

No.	Pos.	Nation	Player
15	DF	JPN	Toshiki Nakamura (on loan to (Japan) Suzuka Unlimited FC)
26	MF	JPN	Daiki Deoka (on loan to (Japan) Fujieda MYFC)

== Blaublitz Akita ==
In: Note: Flags indicate national team as defined under FIFA eligibility rules; some limited exceptions apply. Players may hold more than one non-FIFA nationality.

No.	Pos.	Nation	Player
30	MF	JPN	Ryo Toyama (on loan from (Japan) Mito HollyHock)

Out: Note: Flags indicate national team as defined under FIFA eligibility rules; some limited exceptions apply. Players may hold more than one non-FIFA nationality.

No.	Pos.	Nation	Player

== Azul Claro Numazu ==
In: Note: Flags indicate national team as defined under FIFA eligibility rules; some limited exceptions apply. Players may hold more than one non-FIFA nationality.

No.	Pos.	Nation	Player

Out: Note: Flags indicate national team as defined under FIFA eligibility rules; some limited exceptions apply. Players may hold more than one non-FIFA nationality.

No.	Pos.	Nation	Player

== Kagoshima United FC ==
In: Note: Flags indicate national team as defined under FIFA eligibility rules; some limited exceptions apply. Players may hold more than one non-FIFA nationality.

No.	Pos.	Nation	Player
20	FW	JPN	Yuki Nakayama (on loan from (Japan) Yokohama FC)
29	FW	JPN	Takuma Sonoda (on loan from (Japan) Tokushima Vortis)
32	MF	JPN	Taku Ushinohama (on loan from (Japan) Tochigi SC)

Out: Note: Flags indicate national team as defined under FIFA eligibility rules; some limited exceptions apply. Players may hold more than one non-FIFA nationality.

No.	Pos.	Nation	Player
4	DF	JPN	Kyohei Kuroki (on loan to (Japan) Kyoto Sanga)
9	FW	BRA	Alex (on loan to (Japan) Tochigi SC)

== Nagano Parceiro ==
In: Note: Flags indicate national team as defined under FIFA eligibility rules; some limited exceptions apply. Players may hold more than one non-FIFA nationality.

No.	Pos.	Nation	Player

Out: Note: Flags indicate national team as defined under FIFA eligibility rules; some limited exceptions apply. Players may hold more than one non-FIFA nationality.

No.	Pos.	Nation	Player

== FC Ryukyu ==
In: Note: Flags indicate national team as defined under FIFA eligibility rules; some limited exceptions apply. Players may hold more than one non-FIFA nationality.

No.	Pos.	Nation	Player

Out: Note: Flags indicate national team as defined under FIFA eligibility rules; some limited exceptions apply. Players may hold more than one non-FIFA nationality.

No.	Pos.	Nation	Player
29	FW	NOR	Karbon Fidel (released)

== Fujieda MYFC ==
In: Note: Flags indicate national team as defined under FIFA eligibility rules; some limited exceptions apply. Players may hold more than one non-FIFA nationality.

No.	Pos.	Nation	Player
18	FW	JPN	Keisuke Endo (from (Japan) Kataller Toyama)
34	MF	JPN	Daiki Deoka (on loan from (Japan) Thespakusatsu Gunma)

Out: Note: Flags indicate national team as defined under FIFA eligibility rules; some limited exceptions apply. Players may hold more than one non-FIFA nationality.

No.	Pos.	Nation	Player
18	DF	JPN	Takemasa Taneoka (released)

== Kataller Toyama ==
In: Note: Flags indicate national team as defined under FIFA eligibility rules; some limited exceptions apply. Players may hold more than one non-FIFA nationality.

No.	Pos.	Nation	Player
25	DF	JPN	Daniel Matsuzaka (from (England) Southend United)
29	FW	JPN	Masakazu Yoshioka (on loan from (Japan) V-Varen Nagasaki)
32	MF	JPN	Tatsuki Noda (on loan from (Japan) Vissel Kobe)
36	DF	JPN	Jin Ikoma (on loan from (Japan) Yokohama F. Marinos)
41	MF	JPN	Yu Kimura (on loan from (Japan) V-Varen Nagasaki)

Out: Note: Flags indicate national team as defined under FIFA eligibility rules; some limited exceptions apply. Players may hold more than one non-FIFA nationality.

No.	Pos.	Nation	Player
8	FW	JPN	Keisuke Endo (to (Japan) Fujieda MYFC)
23	FW	JPN	Kosuke Nishi (on loan to (Japan) Toyama Shinjo Club)

== Giravanz Kitakyushu ==
In: Note: Flags indicate national team as defined under FIFA eligibility rules; some limited exceptions apply. Players may hold more than one non-FIFA nationality.

No.	Pos.	Nation	Player

Out: Note: Flags indicate national team as defined under FIFA eligibility rules; some limited exceptions apply. Players may hold more than one non-FIFA nationality.

No.	Pos.	Nation	Player
14	FW	JPN	Shoki Hirai (on loan to (Japan) FC Maruyasu Okazaki)

== Fukushima United FC ==
In: Note: Flags indicate national team as defined under FIFA eligibility rules; some limited exceptions apply. Players may hold more than one non-FIFA nationality.

No.	Pos.	Nation	Player

Out: Note: Flags indicate national team as defined under FIFA eligibility rules; some limited exceptions apply. Players may hold more than one non-FIFA nationality.

No.	Pos.	Nation	Player
18	MF	JPN	Yuki Hashimoto (on loan to (Japan) ReinMeer Aomori FC)

== SC Sagamihara ==
In: Note: Flags indicate national team as defined under FIFA eligibility rules; some limited exceptions apply. Players may hold more than one non-FIFA nationality.

No.	Pos.	Nation	Player
19	FW	BRA	Gabriel Morbeck (on loan from (Japan) Jubilo Iwata)
30	FW	JPN	Kohei Matsumoto (on loan from (Japan) Nagoya Grampus)
33	MF	JPN	Kanta Kajiyama (on loan from (Japan) Nagoya Grampus)
35	DF	JPN	Daiki Morimoto (on loan from (Japan) Matsumoto Yamaga)
50	MF	BRA	Toró (from (Brazil) Goiás EC)

Out: Note: Flags indicate national team as defined under FIFA eligibility rules; some limited exceptions apply. Players may hold more than one non-FIFA nationality.

No.	Pos.	Nation	Player
6	DF	BRA	Samuel Alves (on loan to (Japan) FC Maruyasu Okazaki)
19	FW	JPN	Yosei Otsu (to (Japan) Nara Club)
27	FW	JPN	Seiya Matsuki (released)

== YSCC Yokohama ==
In: Note: Flags indicate national team as defined under FIFA eligibility rules; some limited exceptions apply. Players may hold more than one non-FIFA nationality.

No.	Pos.	Nation	Player
—	GK	CHN	Tianci Zhao (from (China) Guangzhou Evergrande)

Out: Note: Flags indicate national team as defined under FIFA eligibility rules; some limited exceptions apply. Players may hold more than one non-FIFA nationality.

No.	Pos.	Nation	Player
2	DF	JPN	Yusuke Nishiyama (to (Japan) Gainare Tottori)

== Grulla Morioka ==
In: Note: Flags indicate national team as defined under FIFA eligibility rules; some limited exceptions apply. Players may hold more than one non-FIFA nationality.

No.	Pos.	Nation	Player
32	GK	JPN	Yuto Koizumi (on loan from (Japan) Mito HollyHock)
33	FW	CHN	Yu Shan Wen (from Hebei China Fortune)

Out: Note: Flags indicate national team as defined under FIFA eligibility rules; some limited exceptions apply. Players may hold more than one non-FIFA nationality.

No.	Pos.	Nation	Player

== Gainare Tottori ==
In: Note: Flags indicate national team as defined under FIFA eligibility rules; some limited exceptions apply. Players may hold more than one non-FIFA nationality.

No.	Pos.	Nation	Player
25	DF	JPN	Yusuke Nishiyama (from (Japan) YSCC Yokohama)
35	MF	JPN	Ren Sengoku (on loan from (Japan) Tochigi SC)
41	MF	JPN	Naoya Uozato (from (Japan) Cerezo Osaka)

Out: Note: Flags indicate national team as defined under FIFA eligibility rules; some limited exceptions apply. Players may hold more than one non-FIFA nationality.

No.	Pos.	Nation	Player
