= List of J1 League football transfers winter 2017–18 =

This is a list of Japanese football J1 League transfers in the winter transfer window 2017–18 by club.

== J1 League ==
=== Kawasaki Frontale ===
In: Note: Flags indicate national team as defined under FIFA eligibility rules; some limited exceptions apply. Players may hold more than one non-FIFA nationality.

No.	Pos.	Nation	Player
4	FW	JPN	Yoshito Okubo (from (Japan) FC Tokyo)
9	FW	JPN	Shuhei Akasaki (from (Japan) Kashima Antlers)
22	MF	JPN	Hokuto Shimoda (from (Japan) Shonan Bellmare)
25	MF	JPN	Hidemasa Morita (from Ryutsu Keizai University)
27	MF	JPN	Yuto Suzuki (from (Japan) Montedio Yamagata)
28	MF	JPN	Yasuto Wakizaka (from Hannan University)
31	GK	JPN	William Popp (from (Japan) Tokyo Verdy, previously on loan)
37	MF	JPN	Manabu Saito (from (Japan) Yokohama F. Marinos)
—	MF	JPN	Masataka Kani (from (Japan) FC Imabari, end of loan)

Out: Note: Flags indicate national team as defined under FIFA eligibility rules; some limited exceptions apply. Players may hold more than one non-FIFA nationality.

No.	Pos.	Nation	Player
4	DF	JPN	Yusuke Igawa (to (Hong Kong) Eastern SC)
9	FW	JPN	Takayuki Morimoto (to (Japan) Avispa Fukuoka)
13	MF	JPN	Koji Miyoshi (on loan to (Japan) Consadole Sapporo)
22	MF	BRA	Rhayner (to (Brazil) Ponte Preta, end of loan)
27	FW	JPN	Shohei Otsuka (to (Japan) SC Sagamihara)
28	DF	JPN	Ko Itakura (on loan to (Japan) Vegalta Sendai)
—	MF	JPN	Riki Harakawa (to (Japan) Sagan Tosu, previously on loan)
—	MF	JPN	Yoshihiro Nakano (to (Japan) Vegalta Sendai, previously on loan)
—	MF	JPN	Masataka Kani (to (Japan) Gainare Tottori)

=== Kashima Antlers ===
In: Note: Flags indicate national team as defined under FIFA eligibility rules; some limited exceptions apply. Players may hold more than one non-FIFA nationality.

No.	Pos.	Nation	Player
2	DF	JPN	Atsuto Uchida (from (Germany) 1. FC Union Berlin)
11	MF	BRA	Leandro (from (Brazil) Palmeiras, previously on loan)
19	FW	JPN	Kazuma Yamaguchi (from Hannan University)
31	GK	JPN	Yuya Oki (promoted from youth ranks)
32	DF	JPN	Koki Anzai (from (Japan) Tokyo Verdy)
39	DF	JPN	Tomoya Inukai (from (Japan) Shimizu S-Pulse)
—	FW	JPN	Shuhei Akasaki (from (Japan) Gamba Osaka, end of loan)
—	FW	JPN	Yuta Toyokawa (from (Japan) Fagiano Okayama, end of loan)

Out: Note: Flags indicate national team as defined under FIFA eligibility rules; some limited exceptions apply. Players may hold more than one non-FIFA nationality.

No.	Pos.	Nation	Player
17	DF	BRA	Bueno (on loan to (Japan) Tokushima Vortis)
27	MF	JPN	Takahide Umebachi (to (Japan) Zweigen Kanazawa)
—	GK	JPN	Yuto Koizumi (to (Japan) Mito Hollyhock, previously on loan)
—	FW	JPN	Yuta Toyokawa (to (Belgium) KAS Eupen)
—	FW	JPN	Shuhei Akasaki (to (Japan) Kawasaki Frontale)

=== Cerezo Osaka ===
In: Note: Flags indicate national team as defined under FIFA eligibility rules; some limited exceptions apply. Players may hold more than one non-FIFA nationality.

No.	Pos.	Nation	Player
1	GK	JPN	Takumi Nagaishi (from Fukuoka University)
7	MF	JPN	Kota Mizunuma (from (Japan) FC Tokyo, previously on loan)
13	FW	JPN	Toshiyuki Takagi (from (Japan) Urawa Red Diamonds)
16	FW	JPN	Eiichi Katayama (from (Japan) Fagiano Okayama)
18	FW	KOR	Yang Dong-hyun (from (South Korea) Pohang Steelers)
28	FW	JPN	Motohiko Nakajima (promoted from youth ranks)
32	MF	JPN	Atomu Tanaka (from (Finland) Kawasaki Frontale)
34	FW	JPN	Hiroto Yamada (promoted from youth ranks)
39	MF	THA	Chaowat Veerachat (on loan from (Thailand) Bangkok Glass FC)
40	FW	JPN	Mizuki Ando (from Nagasaki Institute of Applied Science)
41	MF	JPN	Naoya Uozato (from Kwansei Gakuin University)

Out: Note: Flags indicate national team as defined under FIFA eligibility rules; some limited exceptions apply. Players may hold more than one non-FIFA nationality.

No.	Pos.	Nation	Player
1	GK	JPN	Kentaro Kakoi (on loan to (Japan) Avispa Fukuoka)
7	MF	JPN	Kunimitsu Sekiguchi (retired)
28	DF	JPN	Hayato Nukui (to (Japan) Tochigi SC)
32	GK	KOR	Ahn Joon-soo (on loan to (Japan) Kagoshima United FC)
34	MF	JPN	Masaki Sakamoto (to (Japan) Kagoshima United FC)
40	FW	JPN	Takeru Kishimoto (on loan to (Japan) Mito HollyHock)
—	GK	JPN	Hiroyuki Takeda (to (Japan) Tokyo Verdy, previously on loan)
—	DF	JPN	Jurato Ikeda (to (Japan) Ehime FC)
—	DF	JPN	Kenta Mukuhara (to (Japan) Fagiano Okayama)
—	MF	JPN	Shohei Kiyohara (to (Japan) Zweigen Kanazawa)
—	MF	JPN	Mitsuru Maruoka (on loan to (Japan) Renofa Yamaguchi)

=== Kashiwa Reysol ===
In: Note: Flags indicate national team as defined under FIFA eligibility rules; some limited exceptions apply. Players may hold more than one non-FIFA nationality.

No.	Pos.	Nation	Player
8	MF	JPN	Kei Koizumi (from (Japan) Albirex Niigata)
10	FW	JPN	Ataru Esaka (from (Japan) Omiya Ardija)
11	FW	JPN	Ryohei Yamazaki (from (Japan) Albirex Niigata)
18	MF	JPN	Yusuke Segawa (from (Japan) Omiya Ardija)
21	GK	JPN	Haruki Saruta (promoted from youth ranks)
22	DF	KOR	Park Jeong-su (from (Japan) Yokohama F. Marinos)
24	DF	JPN	Toshiaki Miyamoto (promoted from youth ranks)
25	MF	JPN	Riku Tanaka (promoted from youth ranks)
29	DF	JPN	So Nakagawa (promoted from youth ranks)
30	MF	JPN	Masakatsu Sawa (from (Peru) Deportivo Municipal)
39	DF	JPN	Masashi Kamekawa (from (Japan) Avispa Fukuoka)

Out: Note: Flags indicate national team as defined under FIFA eligibility rules; some limited exceptions apply. Players may hold more than one non-FIFA nationality.

No.	Pos.	Nation	Player
6	MF	JPN	Yusuke Kobayashi (on loan to (Japan) Shonan Bellmare)
8	MF	JPN	Kosuke Taketomi (to (Japan) Urawa Red Diamonds)
10	FW	JPN	Yuki Otsu (to (Japan) Yokohama F. Marinos)
11	FW	BRA	Diego Oliveira (on loan to (Japan) FC Tokyo)
21	DF	JPN	Takuya Hashiguchi (on loan to (Japan) Machida Zelvia)
22	DF	JPN	Naoki Wako (to (Japan) Avispa Fukuoka)
24	FW	JPN	Koki Oshima (to (Japan) Tochigi SC)
—	DF	JPN	Tatsuya Masushima (on loan to (Japan) JEF United Chiba)
—	DF	JPN	Masato Yuzawa (to (Japan) Ventforet Kofu)

=== Yokohama F. Marinos ===
In: Note: Flags indicate national team as defined under FIFA eligibility rules; some limited exceptions apply. Players may hold more than one non-FIFA nationality.

No.	Pos.	Nation	Player
9	FW	JPN	Yuki Otsu (from (Japan) Kashiwa Reysol)
19	FW	JPN	Teruhito Nakagawa (from (Japan) Avispa Fukuoka, end of loan)
25	MF	KOR	Yun Il-lok (from (South Korea) FC Seoul)
29	FW	JPN	Masashi Wada (from (Japan) Renofa Yamaguchi, end of loan)
34	DF	JPN	Taiga Nishiyama (promoted from youth ranks)
36	DF	JPN	Jin Ikoma (from Kagoshima Josei High School)
37	MF	JPN	Kenta Hori (promoted from youth ranks)
38	MF	JPN	Kota Yamada (promoted from youth ranks)
39	FW	JPN	Shuto Machino (from Riseisha High School)

Out: Note: Flags indicate national team as defined under FIFA eligibility rules; some limited exceptions apply. Players may hold more than one non-FIFA nationality.

No.	Pos.	Nation	Player
2	DF	KOR	Park Jeong-su (to (Japan) Kashiwa Reysol)
10	MF	JPN	Manabu Saito (to (Japan) Kawasaki Frontale)
17	FW	JPN	Cayman Togashi (on loan to (Japan) FC Tokyo)
20	MF	NED	Quenten Martinus (to (Japan) Urawa Red Diamonds)
25	MF	JPN	Naoki Maeda (to (Japan) Matsumoto Yamaga)
—	GK	JPN	Junto Taguchi (to (Japan) Albirex Niigata)
—	DF	JPN	Ikki Arai (to (Japan) Nagoya Grampus, previously on loan)
—	MF	JPN	Andrew Kumagai (to (Japan) JEF United Chiba, previously on loan)
—	MF	JPN	Kensei Nakashima (to (Japan) FC Gifu, previously on loan)
—	FW	BRA	Kayke (on loan to (Brazil) EC Bahia)

=== Júbilo Iwata ===
In: Note: Flags indicate national team as defined under FIFA eligibility rules; some limited exceptions apply. Players may hold more than one non-FIFA nationality.

No.	Pos.	Nation	Player
4	DF	JPN	Ryo Shinzato (from (Japan) Ventforet Kofu)
6	DF	BRA	Guilherme (from (Brazil) Paysandu SC)
7	MF	JPN	Taishi Taguchi (from (Japan) Nagoya Grampus)
16	FW	JPN	Seiya Nakano (from University of Tsukuba)
37	FW	BRA	Morbeck (from (Japan) Roasso Kumamoto)
38	MF	JPN	Hiroki Ito (promoted from youth ranks)
—	GK	JPN	Ayumi Niekawa (from (Japan) Thespakusatsu Gunma, end of loan)

Out: Note: Flags indicate national team as defined under FIFA eligibility rules; some limited exceptions apply. Players may hold more than one non-FIFA nationality.

No.	Pos.	Nation	Player
2	DF	JPN	Taisuke Nakamura (to (Japan) Omiya Ardija)
7	MF	JPN	Kota Ueda (to (Japan) Fagiano Okayama)
16	FW	JPN	Kazuki Saito (to (Japan) Fagiano Okayama)
17	MF	JPN	Takafumi Shimizu (to (Japan) Tochigi Uva FC)
40	MF	JPN	Hayao Kawabe (to (Japan) Sanfrecce Hiroshima, end of loan)
—	GK	JPN	Ayumi Niekawa (on loan to (Japan) Azul Claro Numazu)
—	MF	JPN	Hiroto Tanaka (to (Japan) Ehime FC, previously on loan)
—	FW	JPN	Ryuolivier Iwamoto (retired, previously on loan to (Japan) Gainare Tottori)

=== Urawa Red Diamonds ===
In: Note: Flags indicate national team as defined under FIFA eligibility rules; some limited exceptions apply. Players may hold more than one non-FIFA nationality.

No.	Pos.	Nation	Player
7	MF	JPN	Kosuke Taketomi (from (Japan) Kashiwa Reysol)
11	MF	NED	Quenten Martinus (from (Japan) Yokohama F. Marinos)
18	MF	JPN	Naoki Yamada (from (Japan) Shonan Bellmare, end of loan)
26	DF	JPN	Takuya Ogiwara (promoted from youth ranks)
27	DF	JPN	Daiki Hashioka (promoted from youth ranks)
29	MF	JPN	Kai Shibato (from Meiji University)
31	DF	JPN	Takuya Iwanami (from (Japan) Vissel Kobe)

Out: Note: Flags indicate national team as defined under FIFA eligibility rules; some limited exceptions apply. Players may hold more than one non-FIFA nationality.

No.	Pos.	Nation	Player
4	DF	JPN	Daisuke Nasu (to (Japan) Vissel Kobe)
7	MF	JPN	Tsukasa Umesaki (to (Japan) Shonan Bellmare)
8	FW	BRA	Rafael Silva (to (China) Wuhan Zall)
13	FW	JPN	Toshiyuki Takagi (to (Japan) Cerezo Osaka)
17	MF	JPN	Yu Tamura (to (Japan) Avispa Fukuoka, end of loan)
18	MF	JPN	Yoshiaki Komai (on loan to (Japan) Consadole Sapporo)
19	FW	JPN	Ado Onaiwu (on loan to (Japan) Renofa Yamaguchi)
39	MF	JPN	Shinya Yajima (to (Japan) Gamba Osaka)
—	MF	JPN	Haruki Izawa (on loan to (Japan) Tokushima Vortis)
—	MF	JPN	Shota Saito (released)
—	FW	JPN	Naoki Ishihara (to (Japan) Vegalta Sendai, previously on loan)

=== Sagan Tosu ===
In: Note: Flags indicate national team as defined under FIFA eligibility rules; some limited exceptions apply. Players may hold more than one non-FIFA nationality.

No.	Pos.	Nation	Player
3	DF	JPN	Yuji Takahashi (from (Japan) Kyoto Sanga)
4	MF	JPN	Riki Harakawa (from (Japan) Kawasaki Frontale, previously on loan)
24	DF	JPN	Kazuki Anzai (from (Japan) Tokyo Verdy)
26	MF	JPN	Ryoya Ito (from (Germany) Fortuna Düsseldorf)
36	MF	JPN	Hideto Takahashi (from (Japan) Vissel Kobe)
—	MF	JPN	Keiya Nakami (from (Japan) Zweigen Kanazawa, end of loan)

Out: Note: Flags indicate national team as defined under FIFA eligibility rules; some limited exceptions apply. Players may hold more than one non-FIFA nationality.

No.	Pos.	Nation	Player
11	FW	JPN	Yohei Toyoda (on loan to (South Korea) Ulsan Hyundai FC)
35	DF	JPN	Takeshi Aoki (to (Japan) Roasso Kumamoto)
—	GK	JPN	Eisuke Fujishima (to (Japan) Renofa Yamaguchi)
—	DF	JPN	Tatsuya Sakai (to (Japan) Montedio Yamagata)
—	MF	JPN	Tetsuro Ota (to (Japan) ReinMeer Aomori)
—	MF	JPN	Keiya Nakami (to (Japan) Matsumoto Yamaga)
—	MF	JPN	Naoya Kikuchi (to (Japan) Consadole Sapporo, previously on loan)
—	FW	JPN	Takamitsu Tomiyama (to (Japan) Omiya Ardija)
—	MF	JPN	Yoshizumi Ogawa (to (Japan) Albirex Niigata, previously on loan)

=== Vissel Kobe ===
In: Note: Flags indicate national team as defined under FIFA eligibility rules; some limited exceptions apply. Players may hold more than one non-FIFA nationality.

No.	Pos.	Nation	Player
2	DF	JPN	Daisuke Nasu (from (Japan) Urawa Red Diamonds)
5	MF	KOR	Jung Woo-young (from (China) Chongqing Lifan)
8	MF	JPN	Hirotaka Mita (from (Japan) Vegalta Sendai)
15	DF	JPN	Daiki Miya (from Biwako Seikei Sport College)
17	FW	BRA	Wellington (from (Japan) Avispa Fukuoka)
27	MF	JPN	Yuta Goke (from Aomori Yamada High School)
29	GK	JPN	Kota Ogi (from (Japan) Nagoya Grampus)
30	DF	THA	Theerathon Bunmathan (on loan from (Thailand) Muangthong United)
36	FW	JPN	Tatsuki Noda (from (Japan) FC Imabari, end of loan)
38	FW	JPN	Daiji Sasaki (promoted from youth ranks)

Out: Note: Flags indicate national team as defined under FIFA eligibility rules; some limited exceptions apply. Players may hold more than one non-FIFA nationality.

No.	Pos.	Nation	Player
5	DF	JPN	Takuya Iwanami (to (Japan) Urawa Red Diamonds)
7	MF	BRA	Nílton (to (Brazil) EC Bahia)
8	MF	BRA	Wescley (on loan to (Brazil) Ceará)
15	MF	JPN	Seigo Kobayashi (on loan to (Japan) Montedio Yamagata)
16	MF	JPN	Hideto Takahashi (to (Japan) Sagan Tosu)
17	MF	JPN	Hideo Tanaka (to (Japan) Tegevajaro Miyazaki)
25	DF	JPN	Junya Higashi (on loan to (Japan) Fukushima United FC)
26	DF	JPN	Shinji Yamaguchi (on loan to (Japan) Oita Trinita)
29	MF	JPN	Kotaro Omori (to (Japan) FC Tokyo)
30	GK	JPN	Kenta Tokushige (to (Japan) V-Varen Nagasaki)
—	MF	JPN	Ryo Matsumura (to (Japan) Nagano Parceiro)
—	FW	JPN	Akito Mukai (on loan to (Japan) MIO Biwako Shiga)

=== Gamba Osaka ===
In: Note: Flags indicate national team as defined under FIFA eligibility rules; some limited exceptions apply. Players may hold more than one non-FIFA nationality.

No.	Pos.	Nation	Player
13	DF	JPN	Shunya Suganuma (from (Japan) Montedio Yamagata)
21	MF	JPN	Shinya Yajima (from (Japan) Urawa Red Diamonds)
32	MF	JPN	Ren Shimaboto (promoted from youth ranks)
34	MF	JPN	Yuya Fukuda (from Higashi Fukuoka High School)
35	DF	JPN	Tatsuya Yamaguchi (from Tokai University Sagami High School)
36	DF	JPN	Riku Matsuda (from Maebashi Ikuei High School)
37	FW	JPN	Haruto Shirai (promoted from youth ranks)
38	FW	JPN	Kento Nakamura (from Mitsubishi Yowa SC Youth)
41	GK	JPN	Kosei Tani (promoted from youth ranks)

Out: Note: Flags indicate national team as defined under FIFA eligibility rules; some limited exceptions apply. Players may hold more than one non-FIFA nationality.

No.	Pos.	Nation	Player
6	DF	KOR	Kim Jung-ya (to (Japan) Vegalta Sendai)
8	MF	JPN	Yosuke Ideguchi (to (England) Leeds United)
13	FW	JPN	Hiroto Goya (on loan to (Japan) Tokushima Vortis)
18	GK	JPN	Yosuke Fujigaya (retired)
23	MF	JPN	Shogo Nakahara (to (Japan) Consadole Sapporo, end of loan)
28	MF	JPN	Shota Yomesaka (to (Japan) Grulla Morioka)
29	FW	JPN	Hiromu Kori (to (Japan) Tokyo Verdy, end of loan)
30	FW	JPN	So Hirao (on loan to (Japan) Avispa Fukuoka)
53	FW	JPN	Shuhei Akasaki (to (Japan) Kashima Antlers, end of loan)
—	MF	JPN	Tatsuya Uchida (to (Japan) Tokyo Verdy, previously on loan)

=== Consadole Sapporo ===
In: Note: Flags indicate national team as defined under FIFA eligibility rules; some limited exceptions apply. Players may hold more than one non-FIFA nationality.

No.	Pos.	Nation	Player
1	GK	JPN	Takanori Sugeno (on loan from (Japan) Kyoto Sanga)
2	MF	JPN	Tomonobu Yokoyama (from (Japan) Omiya Ardija, previously on loan)
14	MF	JPN	Yoshiaki Komai (on loan from (Japan) Urawa Red Diamonds)
15	MF	JPN	Naoya Kikuchi (from (Japan) Sagan Tosu, previously on loan)
19	MF	JPN	Kosuke Shirai (from (Japan) Ehime FC)
21	GK	JPN	Shunta Awaka (from (Japan) Ehime FC, end of loan)
31	FW	JPN	Takumi Miyayoshi (from (Japan) Sanfrecce Hiroshima)
40	FW	JPN	Ren Fujimura (promoted from youth ranks)
41	MF	JPN	Koji Miyoshi (on loan from (Japan) Kawasaki Frontale)
—	MF	JPN	Shogo Nakahara (from (Japan) Gamba Osaka, end of loan)

Out: Note: Flags indicate national team as defined under FIFA eligibility rules; some limited exceptions apply. Players may hold more than one non-FIFA nationality.

No.	Pos.	Nation	Player
1	GK	JPN	Junki Kanayama (to (Japan) Fagiano Okayama)
5	DF	JPN	Takahiro Masukawa (to (Japan) Kyoto Sanga)
14	DF	JPN	Shinya Uehara (to (Japan) Ehime FC)
16	MF	JPN	Hiroyuki Mae (on loan to (Japan) Mito HollyHock)
19	MF	JPN	Kengo Ishii (to (Thailand) Samut Sakhon FC)
22	FW	JPN	Hidetaka Kanazono (on loan to (Japan) Ventforet Kofu)
23	MF	BRA	Diego Macedo (to (Brazil) CA Bragantino)
30	GK	JPN	Tetsu Sugiyama (to (Japan) Tokyo United FC)
—	DF	JPN	Takayuki Mae (to (Japan) Renofa Yamaguchi, previously on loan)
—	MF	JPN	Shogo Nakahara (on loan to (Japan) V-Varen Nagasaki)

=== Vegalta Sendai ===
In: Note: Flags indicate national team as defined under FIFA eligibility rules; some limited exceptions apply. Players may hold more than one non-FIFA nationality.

No.	Pos.	Nation	Player
6	DF	JPN	Ko Itakura (on loan from (Japan) Kawasaki Frontale)
8	MF	JPN	Yoshihiro Shoji (from (Japan) FC Gifu)
11	FW	JPN	Naoki Ishihara (from (Japan) Urawa Red Diamonds, previously on loan)
18	FW	BRA	Rafaelson (on loan from (Brazil) EC Vitoria)
19	FW	JPN	Ryo Germain (from Ryutsu Keizai University)
20	FW	JPN	Takumi Abe (from (South Korea) Ulsan Hyundai FC)
22	GK	JPN	Goro Kawanami (from (Japan) Albirex Niigata)
23	MF	JPN	Yoshihiro Nakano (from (Japan) Kawasaki Frontale, previously on loan)
29	MF	JPN	Shota Kobayashi (from (Japan) Nagoya Grampus, previously on loan)
33	DF	JPN	Masato Tokida (from (Japan) Oita Trinita, end of loan)
39	DF	KOR	Kim Jung-ya (from (Japan) Gamba Osaka)

Out: Note: Flags indicate national team as defined under FIFA eligibility rules; some limited exceptions apply. Players may hold more than one non-FIFA nationality.

No.	Pos.	Nation	Player
6	DF	BRA	Vinicius (released)
8	MF	JPN	Takuya Nozawa (to (Australia) Wollongong Wolves)
9	FW	JPN	Sota Hirayama (retired)
18	MF	JPN	Hirotaka Mita (to (Japan) Vissel Kobe)
20	FW	BRA	Crislan (to (Portugal) Sporting Braga, end of loan)
22	MF	JPN	Kei Ishikawa (to (Japan) Tochigi SC)
26	MF	JPN	Keita Fujimura (on loan to (Japan) Zweigen Kanazawa)
32	DF	JPN	Masaya Kojima (on loan to (Japan) Machida Zelvia)
50	DF	JPN	Tatsuya Masushima (to (Japan) Kashiwa Reysol, end of loan)
—	MF	JPN	Yuto Sashinami (on loan to (Japan) Kataller Toyama)
—	MF	JPN	Takumi Sasaki (on loan to (Japan) Kamatamare Sanuki)

=== FC Tokyo ===
In: Note: Flags indicate national team as defined under FIFA eligibility rules; some limited exceptions apply. Players may hold more than one non-FIFA nationality.

No.	Pos.	Nation	Player
9	FW	BRA	Diego Oliveira (on loan from (Japan) Kashiwa Reysol)
17	FW	JPN	Cayman Togashi (on loan from (Japan) Yokohama F. Marinos)
23	FW	JPN	Kiichi Yajima (from Chuo University)
24	FW	JPN	Taichi Hara (promoted from youth ranks)
39	MF	JPN	Kotaro Omori (from (Japan) Vissel Kobe)
44	MF	JPN	Manato Shinada (promoted from youth ranks)

Out: Note: Flags indicate national team as defined under FIFA eligibility rules; some limited exceptions apply. Players may hold more than one non-FIFA nationality.

No.	Pos.	Nation	Player
9	FW	NGA	Peter Utaka (to (Japan) Sanfrecce Hiroshima, end of loan)
13	FW	JPN	Yoshito Okubo (to (Japan) Kawasaki Frontale)
18	MF	JPN	Naohiro Ishikawa (retired)
21	FW	KOR	Yu In-soo (on loan to (Japan) Avispa Fukuoka)
22	DF	JPN	Yuhei Tokunaga (to (Japan) V-Varen Nagasaki)
24	MF	JPN	Wataru Sasaki (to (Japan) Kamatamare Sanuki)
—	MF	JPN	Kota Mizunuma (to (Japan) Cerezo Osaka, previously on loan)
—	MF	JPN	Hideyuki Nozawa (on loan to (Japan) Ehime FC)

=== Shimizu S-Pulse ===
In: Note: Flags indicate national team as defined under FIFA eligibility rules; some limited exceptions apply. Players may hold more than one non-FIFA nationality.

No.	Pos.	Nation	Player
3	DF	KOR	Hwang Seok-ho (from (China) Tianjin Teda)
14	MF	JPN	Jumpei Kusukami (from (Australia) Western Sydney Wanderers)
15	MF	JPN	Akihiro Hyodo (from (Japan) Ventforet Kofu)
20	FW	BRA	Crislan (on loan from (Portugal) Sporting Braga)
29	MF	JPN	Hideki Ishige (from (Japan) Fagiano Okayama, end of loan)
31	GK	JPN	Yoshiaki Arai (from Ryutsu Keizai University)
32	MF	JPN	Takuma Mizutani (from (Japan) FC Imabari, end of loan)
34	FW	JPN	Yuta Taki (promoted from youth ranks)
35	DF	JPN	Kenta Ito (promoted from youth ranks)
36	MF	JPN	Yasufumi Nishimura (from Kokoku High School)
37	FW	JPN	Daigo Takahashi (from Kamimura Gakuen High School)
46	FW	JPN	Jin Hiratsuka (promoted from youth ranks)

Out: Note: Flags indicate national team as defined under FIFA eligibility rules; some limited exceptions apply. Players may hold more than one non-FIFA nationality.

No.	Pos.	Nation	Player
3	DF	JPN	Tomoya Inukai (to (Japan) Kashima Antlers)
4	DF	BRA	Kanu (to (Thailand) Suphanburi FC)
6	MF	JPN	Kota Sugiyama (retired)
8	FW	BRA	Tiago Alves (to (Saudi Arabia) Al-Hilal FC)
16	DF	JPN	Taisuke Muramatsu (to (Japan) Giravanz Kitakyushu)
22	MF	JPN	Takuma Edamura (on loan to (Japan) Avispa Fukuoka)
—	GK	JPN	Masatoshi Kushibiki (to (Japan) Montedio Yamagata)
—	GK	JPN	Kempei Usui (to (Japan) Okinawa SV)
—	DF	JPN	Takayuki Fukumura (to (Japan) FC Gifu, previously on loan)
—	DF	KOR	Byeon Jun-byum (to (Japan) Ventforet Kofu)
—	DF	KOR	Kim Byeom-yong (to (South Korea) Suwon FC)
—	MF	JPN	Shin Mitsuzaki (released)
—	MF	JPN	Kota Miyamoto (on loan to (Japan) FC Gifu)
—	FW	JPN	Yuji Senuma (to (Japan) Montedio Yamagata, previously on loan)

=== Sanfrecce Hiroshima ===
In: Note: Flags indicate national team as defined under FIFA eligibility rules; some limited exceptions apply. Players may hold more than one non-FIFA nationality.

No.	Pos.	Nation	Player
20	FW	JPN	Daiki Watari (from (Japan) Tokushima Vortis)
23	MF	JPN	Kyohei Yoshino (from (Japan) Kyoto Sanga, end of loan)
27	DF	JPN	Kazuaki Mawatari (from (Japan) Tokushima Vortis)
31	FW	THA	Teerasil Dangda (on loan from (Thailand) Muangthong United)
33	DF	JPN	Takuya Wada (from (Japan) Omiya Ardija)
36	MF	JPN	Hayao Kawabe (from (Japan) Júbilo Iwata, end of loan)
38	GK	JPN	Keisuke Osako (promoted from youth ranks)
—	MF	JPN	Takumu Kawamura (promoted from youth ranks)
—	MF	JPN	Ayumu Kawai (promoted from youth ranks)
—	FW	NGA	Peter Utaka (from (Japan) FC Tokyo, end of loan)

Out: Note: Flags indicate national team as defined under FIFA eligibility rules; some limited exceptions apply. Players may hold more than one non-FIFA nationality.

No.	Pos.	Nation	Player
7	MF	JPN	Yusuke Chajima (on loan to (Japan) JEF United Chiba)
14	MF	CRO	Mihael Mikic (to (Japan) Shonan Bellmare)
20	FW	AUS	Nathan Burns (to (New Zealand) Wellington Phoenix)
22	FW	JPN	Yusuke Minagawa (on loan to (Japan) Roasso Kumamoto)
24	MF	JPN	Yoichi Naganuma (on loan to (Japan) FC Gifu)
25	DF	JPN	Osamu Henry Iyoha (on loan to (Japan) FC Gifu)
28	MF	JPN	Takuya Marutani (to (Japan) Oita Trinita)
31	FW	JPN	Takumi Miyayoshi (to (Japan) Consadole Sapporo)
43	DF	JPN	Kenta Mukuhara (to (Japan) Cerezo Osaka, end of loan)
44	FW	BRA	Anderson Lopes (to (Brazil) Tombense, end of loan)
—	DF	JPN	Yasumasa Kawasaki (to (Japan) Yokohama FC, previously on loan)
—	DF	JPN	Naoki Otani (to (Japan) Machida Zelvia, previously on loan)
—	FW	NGA	Peter Utaka (released)

=== Shonan Bellmare ===
In: Note: Flags indicate national team as defined under FIFA eligibility rules; some limited exceptions apply. Players may hold more than one non-FIFA nationality.

No.	Pos.	Nation	Player
5	MF	JPN	Yusuke Kobayashi (on loan from (Japan) Kashiwa Reysol)
7	MF	JPN	Tsukasa Umesaki (from (Japan) Urawa Red Diamonds)
8	DF	JPN	Kazunari Ono (from (Japan) Albirex Niigata)
9	FW	KOR	Lee Jeong-hyeop (from (South Korea) Busan I-Park)
11	DF	JPN	Ryo Takahashi (from (Japan) Nagoya Grampus, previously on loan)
18	MF	JPN	Temma Matsuda (from NIFS Kanoya)
19	FW	SRB	Alen Stevanovic (from (Serbia) Partizan Belgrade)
20	DF	JPN	Keisuke Saka (from Juntendo University)
21	GK	JPN	Daiki Tomii (from (Japan) Montedio Yamagata)
26	FW	JPN	Kazuki Yamaguchi (from Kokushikan University)
27	FW	JPN	Kunitomo Suzuki (from Toin University of Yokohama)
32	MF	JPN	Hikaru Arai (from Ichiritsu Nagano High School)
33	GK	JPN	Kota Sanada (promoted from youth ranks)
41	MF	CRO	Mihael Mikic (from (Japan) Sanfrecce Hiroshima)

Out: Note: Flags indicate national team as defined under FIFA eligibility rules; some limited exceptions apply. Players may hold more than one non-FIFA nationality.

No.	Pos.	Nation	Player
8	MF	JPN	Naoki Yamada (to (Japan) Urawa Red Diamonds, end of loan)
9	FW	BRA	Dinei (to (Japan) Ventforet Kofu)
10	FW	SRB	Dragan Mrdja (released)
11	FW	JPN	Yoshihito Fujita (to (Japan) Blaublitz Akita)
18	MF	JPN	Eijiro Takeda (to (Japan) Yokohama FC)
20	DF	JPN	Keisuke Tsuboi (to (Japan) Renofa Yamaguchi)
22	MF	JPN	Hokuto Shimoda (to (Japan) Kawasaki Frontale)
24	MF	JPN	Yuta Narawa (on loan to (Japan) Tokyo Verdy)
25	GK	AUS	Tando Velaphi (released)
27	MF	JPN	Akira Ando (to (Japan) Matsumoto Yamaga)
28	MF	JPN	Yuta Kamiya (on loan to (Japan) Ehime FC)
—	GK	JPN	Yuji Kajikawa (to (Japan) Tokushima Vortis, previously on loan)
—	GK	JPN	Go Ito (to (Japan) Fukushima United FC, previously on loan)
—	DF	KOR	Park Tae-hwan (to (South Korea) Cheonan City FC)
—	DF	JPN	Kenta Hirose (to (Japan) Albirex Niigata)
—	FW	JPN	Shota Tamura (to (Japan) Fukushima United FC, previously on loan)
—	FW	JPN	Hibiki Wada (on loan to (Japan) Fukushima United FC)
—	FW	JPN	Tsuyoshi Miyaichi (on loan to (Japan) Grulla Morioka)

=== V-Varen Nagasaki ===
In: Note: Flags indicate national team as defined under FIFA eligibility rules; some limited exceptions apply. Players may hold more than one non-FIFA nationality.

No.	Pos.	Nation	Player
10	MF	JPN	Masato Kurogi (from (Japan) Ventforet Kofu)
11	FW	JPN	Musashi Suzuki (from (Japan) Albirex Niigata)
14	DF	JPN	Hokuto Nakamura (from (Japan) Avispa Fukuoka)
17	MF	JPN	Shogo Nakahara (on loan from (Japan) Consadole Sapporo)
18	MF	AUS	Ben Halloran (from (Germany) 1. FC Heidenheim)
23	MF	JPN	Ryo Niizato (from Juntendo University)
25	DF	JPN	Takuto Honda (from Tokai Gakuen University)
28	MF	JPN	Takumi Nagura (from (Japan) FC Ryukyu)
30	GK	JPN	Kenta Tokushige (from (Japan) Vissel Kobe)
32	DF	JPN	Yuhei Tokunaga (from (Japan) FC Tokyo)
39	DF	KOR	Choi Kyu-baek (from (South Korea) Ulsan Hyundai)

Out: Note: Flags indicate national team as defined under FIFA eligibility rules; some limited exceptions apply. Players may hold more than one non-FIFA nationality.

No.	Pos.	Nation	Player
10	MF	JPN	Yuji Yabu (to (Japan) Fujieda MYFC)
17	DF	JPN	Kenta Furube (to (Japan) Montedio Yamagata)
22	MF	JPN	Kota Miyamoto (to (Japan) Shimizu S-Pulse, end of loan)
27	DF	JPN	Yusuke Murakami (retired)
30	MF	ESP	Miguel Pallardó (released)
31	GK	JPN	Yuya Miura (retired)
32	GK	KOR	Song Young-min (to (Japan) Kamatamare Sanuki)
39	MF	JPN	Mitsuru Maruoka (to (Japan) Cerezo Osaka, end of loan)
—	MF	JPN	Tatsuya Onodera (to (Japan) Giravanz Kitakyushu, previously on loan)
—	MF	JPN	Ryusuke Hayashida (on loan to (Japan) Verspah Oita)

=== Nagoya Grampus ===
In: Note: Flags indicate national team as defined under FIFA eligibility rules; some limited exceptions apply. Players may hold more than one non-FIFA nationality.

No.	Pos.	Nation	Player
2	DF	JPN	Hiroto Hatao (from (Japan) Ventforet Kofu)
3	DF	JPN	Kazuki Kushibiki (from (Japan) Consadole Sapporo, previously on loan)
5	DF	JPN	Ikki Arai (from (Japan) Yokohama F. Marinos, previously on loan)
7	FW	BRA	Jô (from (Brazil) Corinthians)
9	MF	JPN	Ariajasuru Hasegawa (from (Japan) Omiya Ardija)
10	MF	BRA	Gabriel Xavier (loan extended from (Brazil) Cruzeiro)
13	FW	JPN	Yuki Ogaki (from Kokoku High School)
15	MF	JPN	Kazuya Miyahara (loan extended from (Japan) Sanfrecce Hiroshima)
22	GK	AUS	Mitchell Langerak (from (Spain) Levante UD)
—	FW	JPN	Shuto Watanabe (from Tokai Gakuen University)

Out: Note: Flags indicate national team as defined under FIFA eligibility rules; some limited exceptions apply. Players may hold more than one non-FIFA nationality.

No.	Pos.	Nation	Player
6	DF	JPN	Shota Kobayashi (to (Japan) Vegalta Sendai, previously on loan)
7	MF	JPN	Taishi Taguchi (to (Japan) Jubilo Iwata)
9	FW	SWE	Robin Simović (to (Japan) Omiya Ardija)
14	MF	JPN	Ryota Tanabe (to (Japan) Tokyo United FC)
20	MF	JPN	Asahi Yada (to (Japan) JEF United Chiba, previously on loan)
22	GK	JPN	Kota Ogi (to (Japan) Vissel Kobe)
24	DF	JPN	Ryo Takahashi (to (Japan) Shonan Bellmare, previously on loan)
27	MF	JPN	Koki Sugimori (on loan to (Japan) Machida Zelvia)
36	DF	JPN	Ryusuke Sakai (on loan to (Japan) Machida Zelvia)
37	DF	KOR	Lim Seung-gyeom (on loan to (Japan) Oita Trinita)
38	FW	JPN	Ryo Nagai (to (Japan) Matsumoto Yamaga)
