= List of J1 League football transfers summer 2018 =

This is a list of Japanese football J1 League transfers in the summer transfer window 2018 by club.

== J1 League ==
=== Kawasaki Frontale ===
In: Note: Flags indicate national team as defined under FIFA eligibility rules; some limited exceptions apply. Players may hold more than one non-FIFA nationality.

No.	Pos.	Nation	Player
44	MF	(Brazil) BRA	Caio César (to (Brazil) Tombense)

Out: Note: Flags indicate national team as defined under FIFA eligibility rules; some limited exceptions apply. Players may hold more than one non-FIFA nationality.

No.	Pos.	Nation	Player
4	FW	(Japan) JPN	Yoshito Okubo (to (Japan) Jubilo Iwata)
21	MF	(Brazil) BRA	Eduardo Neto (to (Japan) Nagoya Grampus)

=== Kashima Antlers ===
In: Note: Flags indicate national team as defined under FIFA eligibility rules; some limited exceptions apply. Players may hold more than one non-FIFA nationality.

No.	Pos.	Nation	Player
5	DF	(South Korea) KOR	Jung Seung-hyun (from (Japan) Sagan Tosu)
18	MF	(Brazil) BRA	Serginho (from (Brazil) Santos FC)
37	MF	(Japan) JPN	Shintaro Nago (from Juntendo University)

Out: Note: Flags indicate national team as defined under FIFA eligibility rules; some limited exceptions apply. Players may hold more than one non-FIFA nationality.

No.	Pos.	Nation	Player
5	DF	(Japan) JPN	Naomichi Ueda (to (Belgium) Cercle Brugge)
7	FW	(Brazil) BRA	Pedro Júnior (on loan to (China) Wuhan Zall)
10	FW	(Japan) JPN	Mu Kanazaki (to (Japan) Sagan Tosu)

=== Cerezo Osaka ===
In: Note: Flags indicate national team as defined under FIFA eligibility rules; some limited exceptions apply. Players may hold more than one non-FIFA nationality.

No.	Pos.	Nation	Player
44	FW	(Australia) AUS	Pierce Waring (from (Australia) Melbourne Victory)

Out: Note: Flags indicate national team as defined under FIFA eligibility rules; some limited exceptions apply. Players may hold more than one non-FIFA nationality.

No.	Pos.	Nation	Player
25	MF	(Japan) JPN	Hirofumi Yamauchi (on loan to (Japan) Machida Zelvia)
41	MF	(Japan) JPN	Naoya Uozato (to (Japan) Gainare Tottori)

=== Kashiwa Reysol ===
In: Note: Flags indicate national team as defined under FIFA eligibility rules; some limited exceptions apply. Players may hold more than one non-FIFA nationality.

No.	Pos.	Nation	Player
3	DF	(Brazil) BRA	Nathan Ribeiro (on loan from (Brazil) Fluminense)
4	DF	(Japan) JPN	Daisuke Suzuki (from (Spain) Gimnàstic de Tarragona)
6	DF	(Japan) JPN	Toshiya Takagi (from (Japan) JEF United Chiba)
26	FW	(Kenya) KEN	Michael Olunga (from (China) Guizhou Hengfeng)

Out: Note: Flags indicate national team as defined under FIFA eligibility rules; some limited exceptions apply. Players may hold more than one non-FIFA nationality.

No.	Pos.	Nation	Player
3	DF	(South Korea) KOR	Yun Suk-young (on loan to (South Korea) Ventforet Kofu)
4	DF	(Japan) JPN	Shinnosuke Nakatani (to (Japan) Nagoya Grampus)
20	MF	(Brazil) BRA	Ramon Lopes (to (Japan) Vegalta Sendai)
26	DF	(Japan) JPN	Taiyo Koga (on loan to (Japan) Avispa Fukuoka)
28	DF	(Japan) JPN	Tomoki Imai (to (Japan) Matsumoto Yamaga)

=== Yokohama F. Marinos ===
In: Note: Flags indicate national team as defined under FIFA eligibility rules; some limited exceptions apply. Players may hold more than one non-FIFA nationality.

No.	Pos.	Nation	PlayerThiago Martins Bueno
2	DF	(Serbia) SRB	Dušan Cvetinović (from (France) RC Lens)
13	DF	(Brazil) BRA	Thiago Martins (on loan from (Brazil) Palmeiras)
15	FW	(Japan) JPN	Takefusa Kubo (on loan from (Japan) FC Tokyo)
44	DF	(Japan) JPN	Shinnosuke Hatanaka (from (Japan) Tokyo Verdy)

Out: Note: Flags indicate national team as defined under FIFA eligibility rules; some limited exceptions apply. Players may hold more than one non-FIFA nationality.

No.	Pos.	Nation	Player
2	DF	(Australia) AUS	Milos Degenek (to (Serbia) Red Star Belgrade)
13	DF	(Japan) JPN	Takashi Kanai (to (Japan) Nagoya Grampus)
23	DF	(Japan) JPN	Takumi Shimohira (on loan to (Japan) JEF United Chiba)
33	MF	(North Macedonia) MKD	David Babunski (to (Japan) Omiya Ardija)
36	DF	(Japan) JPN	Jin Ikoma (on loan to (Japan) Kataller Toyama)

=== Júbilo Iwata ===
In: Note: Flags indicate national team as defined under FIFA eligibility rules; some limited exceptions apply. Players may hold more than one non-FIFA nationality.

No.	Pos.	Nation	Player
6	DF	(Turkey) TUR	Eren Albayrak (from (Turkey) Konyaspor)
22	FW	(Japan) JPN	Yoshito Okubo (from (Japan) Kawasaki Frontale)
30	GK	(Japan) JPN	Ko Shimura (from (Japan) Mito HollyHock, end of loan)

Out: Note: Flags indicate national team as defined under FIFA eligibility rules; some limited exceptions apply. Players may hold more than one non-FIFA nationality.

No.	Pos.	Nation	Player
31	GK	(Japan) JPN	Ko Shimura (on loan to (Japan) Mito HollyHock)
37	FW	(Brazil) BRA	Gabriel Morbeck (on loan to (Japan) SC Sagamihara)

=== Urawa Red Diamonds ===
In: Note: Flags indicate national team as defined under FIFA eligibility rules; some limited exceptions apply. Players may hold more than one non-FIFA nationality.

No.	Pos.	Nation	Player
12	FW	(Brazil) BRA	Fabrício (from (Portugal) Portimonense)
17	DF	(Japan) JPN	Rikiya Motegi (from (Japan) Montedio Yamagata, back from loan)

Out: Note: Flags indicate national team as defined under FIFA eligibility rules; some limited exceptions apply. Players may hold more than one non-FIFA nationality.

No.	Pos.	Nation	Player
6	DF	(Japan) JPN	Wataru Endo (to (Belgium) Sint-Truidense V.V.)

=== Sagan Tosu ===
In: Note: Flags indicate national team as defined under FIFA eligibility rules; some limited exceptions apply. Players may hold more than one non-FIFA nationality.

No.	Pos.	Nation	Player
9	FW	(Spain) ESP	Fernando Torres (from (Spain) Atlético Madrid)
11	FW	(Japan) JPN	Yohei Toyoda (from (South Korea) Ulsan Hyundai, back from loan)
16	MF	(Japan) JPN	Yatsunori Shimaya (from (Japan) Tokushima Vortis)
33	DF	(Lebanon) LBN	Joan Oumari (from (United Arab Emirates) Al-Nasr Dubai SC)
38	DF	(Japan) JPN	Daichi Inui (on loan from (Japan) V-Varen Nagasaki)
44	FW	(Japan) JPN	Mu Kanazaki (from (Japan) Kashima Antlers)

Out: Note: Flags indicate national team as defined under FIFA eligibility rules; some limited exceptions apply. Players may hold more than one non-FIFA nationality.

No.	Pos.	Nation	Player
1	GK	(Japan) JPN	Taku Akahoshi (on loan to (Japan) Tokushima Vortis)
15	DF	(South Korea) KOR	Jung Seung-hyun (to (Japan) Kashima Antlers)
50	MF	(Japan) JPN	Koki Mizuno (on loan to (Japan) Roasso Kumamoto)

=== Vissel Kobe ===
In: Note: Flags indicate national team as defined under FIFA eligibility rules; some limited exceptions apply. Players may hold more than one non-FIFA nationality.

No.	Pos.	Nation	Player
5	DF	(Qatar) QAT	Ahmed Yasser (on loan from (Qatar) Al-Duhail SC)
8	MF	(Spain) ESP	Andrés Iniesta (from (Spain) FC Barcelona)
16	FW	(Japan) JPN	Kyogo Furuhashi (from (Japan) FC Gifu)
20	FW	(Japan) JPN	Shun Nagasawa (on loan from (Japan) Gamba Osaka)
25	DF	(Japan) JPN	Leo Osaki (from (Japan) Tokushima Vortis)
—	FW	(Japan) JPN	Akito Mukai (from (Japan) MIO Biwako Shiga, end of loan)

Out: Note: Flags indicate national team as defined under FIFA eligibility rules; some limited exceptions apply. Players may hold more than one non-FIFA nationality.

No.	Pos.	Nation	Player
5	MF	(South Korea) KOR	Jung Woo-young (to (Qatar) Al-Sadd)
9	FW	(Japan) JPN	Mike Havenaar (on loan to (Japan) Vegalta Sendai)
11	FW	(Brazil) BRA	Leandro (to (Japan) Tokyo Verdy)
13	FW	(Japan) JPN	Keijiro Ogawa (on loan to (Japan) Shonan Bellmare)
19	FW	(Japan) JPN	Kazuma Watanabe (to (Japan) Gamba Osaka)
28	GK	(Japan) JPN	Kenshin Yoshimaru (on loan to (Japan) Tokushima Vortis)
31	MF	(Japan) JPN	Yuya Nakasaka (on loan to (Spain) CF Peralada-Girona B)
36	MF	(Japan) JPN	Tatsuki Noda (on loan to (Japan) Kataller Toyama)
38	MF	(Japan) JPN	Daiju Sasaki (on loan to (Brazil) Palmeiras)
—	FW	(Japan) JPN	Akito Mukai (on loan to (Japan) FC Imabari)

=== Gamba Osaka ===
In: Note: Flags indicate national team as defined under FIFA eligibility rules; some limited exceptions apply. Players may hold more than one non-FIFA nationality.

No.	Pos.	Nation	Player
39	FW	(Japan) JPN	Kazuma Watanabe (from (Japan) Vissel Kobe)
50	FW	(Japan) JPN	Kosuke Onose (from (Japan) Renofa Yamaguchi)

Out: Note: Flags indicate national team as defined under FIFA eligibility rules; some limited exceptions apply. Players may hold more than one non-FIFA nationality.

No.	Pos.	Nation	Player
8	MF	(Brazil) BRA	Matheus Jesus (to (Portugal) Estoril, end of loan)
20	FW	(Japan) JPN	Shun Nagasawa (on loan to (Japan) Vissel Kobe)
21	MF	(Japan) JPN	Shinya Yajima (on loan to (Japan) Vegalta Sendai)
39	MF	(Japan) JPN	Jin Izumisawa (on loan to (Japan) Tokyo Verdy)
—	MF	(Japan) JPN	Ritsu Doan (to (Netherlands) FC Groningen, previously on loan)

=== Consadole Sapporo ===
In: Note: Flags indicate national team as defined under FIFA eligibility rules; some limited exceptions apply. Players may hold more than one non-FIFA nationality.

No.	Pos.	Nation	Player
18	MF	(Thailand) THA	Chanathip Songkrasin (from (Thailand) Muangthong United, previously on loan)

Out: Note: Flags indicate national team as defined under FIFA eligibility rules; some limited exceptions apply. Players may hold more than one non-FIFA nationality.

No.	Pos.	Nation	Player
2	MF	(Japan) JPN	Tomonobu Yokoyama (on loan to (Japan) Roasso Kumamoto)
7	MF	(Brazil) BRA	Julinho (on loan to (Japan) Renofa Yamaguchi)
11	FW	(Brazil) BRA	Jonathan Reis (to (Japan) Albirex Niigata)

=== Vegalta Sendai ===
In: Note: Flags indicate national team as defined under FIFA eligibility rules; some limited exceptions apply. Players may hold more than one non-FIFA nationality.

No.	Pos.	Nation	Player
15	MF	(Japan) JPN	Shinya Yajima (on loan from (Japan) Gamba Osaka)
18	FW	(Brazil) BRA	Rafaelson (from (Brazil) EC Vitoria, previously on loan)
37	MF	(Brazil) BRA	Ramon Lopes (from (Japan) Kashiwa Reysol)
41	FW	(Japan) JPN	Mike Havenaar (on loan from (Japan) Vissel Kobe)

Out: Note: Flags indicate national team as defined under FIFA eligibility rules; some limited exceptions apply. Players may hold more than one non-FIFA nationality.

No.	Pos.	Nation	Player
8	MF	(Japan) JPN	Yoshihiro Shoji (on loan to (Japan) Kyoto Sanga)
14	MF	(Japan) JPN	Jun Kanakubo (to (Japan) Kyoto Sanga)
30	FW	(Japan) JPN	Takuma Nishimura (to (Russia) CSKA Moscow)

=== FC Tokyo ===
In: Note: Flags indicate national team as defined under FIFA eligibility rules; some limited exceptions apply. Players may hold more than one non-FIFA nationality.

No.	Pos.	Nation	Player
5	DF	(Japan) JPN	Daiki Niwa (from (Japan) Sanfrecce Hiroshima)
13	FW	(Brazil) BRA	Lins (on loan from (Japan) Ventforet Kofu)

Out: Note: Flags indicate national team as defined under FIFA eligibility rules; some limited exceptions apply. Players may hold more than one non-FIFA nationality.

No.	Pos.	Nation	Player
4	DF	(Japan) JPN	Kazunori Yoshimoto (on loan to (Japan) Avispa Fukuoka)
5	DF	(Japan) JPN	Yuichi Maruyama (to (Japan) Nagoya Grampus)
10	MF	(Japan) JPN	Yohei Kajiyama (on loan to (Japan) Albirex Niigata)
15	FW	(Japan) JPN	Takefusa Kubo (on loan to (Japan) Yokohama F. Marinos)

=== Shimizu S-Pulse ===
In: Note: Flags indicate national team as defined under FIFA eligibility rules; some limited exceptions apply. Players may hold more than one non-FIFA nationality.

No.	Pos.	Nation	Player
2	DF	(Japan) JPN	Kohei Shimizu (from (Japan) Sanfrecce Hiroshima, previously on loan)
49	FW	(Brazil) BRA	Douglas (from (Turkey) Alanyaspor)

Out: Note: Flags indicate national team as defined under FIFA eligibility rules; some limited exceptions apply. Players may hold more than one non-FIFA nationality.

No.	Pos.	Nation	Player
2	DF	(Japan) JPN	Kohei Shimizu (on loan to (Japan) Ventforet Kofu)
14	MF	(Japan) JPN	Jumpei Kusukami (on loan to (Japan) Montedio Yamagata)
38	DF	(China) CHN	Wu Shao Cong (on loan to (Japan) Kyoto Sanga)

=== Sanfrecce Hiroshima ===
In: Note: Flags indicate national team as defined under FIFA eligibility rules; some limited exceptions apply. Players may hold more than one non-FIFA nationality.

No.	Pos.	Nation	Player
16	FW	(Kosovo) KOS	Besart Berisha (from (Australia) Melbourne Victory)
—	DF	(Japan) JPN	Kohei Shimizu (from (Japan) Shimizu S-Pulse, end of loan)

Out: Note: Flags indicate national team as defined under FIFA eligibility rules; some limited exceptions apply. Players may hold more than one non-FIFA nationality.

No.	Pos.	Nation	Player
3	DF	(Japan) JPN	Soya Takahashi (on loan to (Japan) Fagiano Okayama)
28	DF	(Japan) JPN	Daiki Niwa (to (Japan) FC Tokyo)
—	DF	(Japan) JPN	Kohei Shimizu (to (Japan) Shimizu S-Pulse)

=== Shonan Bellmare ===
In: Note: Flags indicate national team as defined under FIFA eligibility rules; some limited exceptions apply. Players may hold more than one non-FIFA nationality.

No.	Pos.	Nation	Player
38	FW	(Japan) JPN	Ryogo Yamasaki (from (Japan) Tokushima Vortis)
50	FW	(Japan) JPN	Keijiro Ogawa (on loan from (Japan) Vissel Kobe)
—	FW	(Japan) JPN	Yuki Ohashi (from Yachiyo High School)

Out: Note: Flags indicate national team as defined under FIFA eligibility rules; some limited exceptions apply. Players may hold more than one non-FIFA nationality.

No.	Pos.	Nation	Player
24	FW	(Japan) JPN	Genta Omotehara (on loan to (Japan) Tokushima Vortis)

=== V-Varen Nagasaki ===
In: Note: Flags indicate national team as defined under FIFA eligibility rules; some limited exceptions apply. Players may hold more than one non-FIFA nationality.

No.	Pos.	Nation	Player
18	FW	(Spain) ESP	Jairo Morillas (from (Spain) RCD Espanyol)
27	DF	(Japan) JPN	Yuki Omoto (from (Japan) Tokushima Vortis)
38	MF	(Japan) JPN	Ryota Isomura (from (Japan) Albirex Niigata)
45	MF	(Netherlands) NED	Jordy Buijs (from (Australia) Sydney FC)

Out: Note: Flags indicate national team as defined under FIFA eligibility rules; some limited exceptions apply. Players may hold more than one non-FIFA nationality.

No.	Pos.	Nation	Player
2	DF	(Japan) JPN	Masakazu Tashiro (on loan to (Japan) Yokohama FC)
8	MF	(Japan) JPN	Yu Kimura (on loan to (Japan) Kataller Toyama)
13	DF	(Japan) JPN	Daichi Inui (on loan to (Japan) Sagan Tosu)
16	FW	(Japan) JPN	Masakazu Yoshioka (on loan to (Japan) Kataller Toyama)
18	MF	(Australia) AUS	Ben Halloran (released)
23	DF	(Japan) JPN	Fumitaka Kitatani (on loan to (Japan) FC Gifu)
24	DF	(Japan) JPN	Yuki Kagawa (on loan to (Japan) Tokyo Verdy)
25	DF	(Japan) JPN	Takuto Honda (on loan to (Japan) Verspah Oita)
26	MF	(Japan) JPN	Teppei Usui (on loan to (Japan) Thespakusatsu Gunma)

=== Nagoya Grampus ===
In: Note: Flags indicate national team as defined under FIFA eligibility rules; some limited exceptions apply. Players may hold more than one non-FIFA nationality.

No.	Pos.	Nation	Player
15	MF	(Brazil) BRA	Eduardo Neto (from (Japan) Kawasaki Frontale)
17	DF	(Japan) JPN	Yuichi Maruyama (from (Japan) FC Tokyo)
20	DF	(Japan) JPN	Shinnosuke Nakatani (from (Japan) Kashiwa Reysol)
25	MF	(Japan) JPN	Naoki Maeda (from (Japan) Matsumoto Yamaga)
31	DF	(Japan) JPN	Takashi Kanai (from (Japan) Yokohama F. Marinos)
47	MF	(Japan) JPN	Yuki Soma (from Waseda University)
—	DF	(South Korea) KOR	Lim Seung-gyeom (from (Japan) Oita Trinita, back from loan)

Out: Note: Flags indicate national team as defined under FIFA eligibility rules; some limited exceptions apply. Players may hold more than one non-FIFA nationality.

No.	Pos.	Nation	Player
2	DF	(Japan) JPN	Hiroto Hatao (on loan to (Japan) Omiya Ardija)
8	MF	(Brazil) BRA	Washington (to (Japan) Renofa Yamaguchi)
19	FW	(Japan) JPN	Yuki Oshitani (to (Japan) Tokushima Vortis)
30	FW	(Japan) JPN	Kosei Matsumoto (on loan to (Japan) SC Sagamihara)
33	MF	(Japan) JPN	Kanta Kajiyama (on loan to (Japan) SC Sagamihara)
39	MF	(Japan) JPN	Kenta Uchida (on loan to (Japan) Montedio Yamagata)
—	DF	(South Korea) KOR	Lim Seung-gyeom (to (South Korea) Mokpo City)
