= Ko Shimura =

Japanese footballer (born 1996)

Ko Shimura 志村 滉
Personal information
- Full name: Ko Shimura
- Date of birth: 27 April 1996 (age 30)
- Place of birth: Chiba, Japan
- Height: 1.86 m (6 ft 1 in)
- Position: Goalkeeper

Team information
- Current team: RB Omiya Ardija
- Number: 40

Youth career
- 2012–2014: Ichiritsu Funabashi High School

Senior career*
Years	Team	Apps	(Gls)
2015–2021	Júbilo Iwata	17	(0)
2018	→ Mito HollyHock (loan)	0	(0)
2020–2021	→ FC Tokyo (loan)	0	(0)
2021	Giravanz Kitakyushu	2	(0)
2022	→ Omiya Ardija (loan)	26	(0)
2023–	Omiya Ardija / RB Omiya Ardija	6	(0)
- * Club domestic league appearances and goals as of 08:49, 19 August 2025 (UTC)

Ko Shimura (志村 滉, Shimura Kō; born 27 April 1996 in Chiba) is a Japanese professional footballer who plays as a goalkeeper for J2 League club RB Omiya Ardija.

== Career statistics ==
As of match played 12 June 2024

Appearances and goals by club, season and competition
Club	Season	League			Emperor's Cup		J.League Cup		Other		Total	
Club	Season	Division	Apps	Goals	Apps	Goals	Apps	Goals	Apps	Goals	Apps	Goals
Júbilo Iwata	2015	J2 League	0	0	0	0	—		—		0	0
Júbilo Iwata	2016	J1 League	10	0	1	0	2	0	—		13	0
Júbilo Iwata	2017	J1 League	0	0	0	0	4	0	—		4	0
Júbilo Iwata	2018	J1 League	0	0	0	0	3	0	—		3	0
Júbilo Iwata	2019	J1 League	0	0	0	0	3	0	—		3	0
Júbilo Iwata	2020	J2 League	7	0	0	0	0	0	—		7	0
Júbilo Iwata	Total		17	0	1	0	12	0	0	0	30	0
Mito HollyHock (loan)	2018	J2 League	0	0	0	0	0	0	—		0	0
FC Tokyo (loan)	2020	J1 League	0	0	0	0	0	0	—		0	0
Giravanz Kitakyushu	2021	J2 League	2	0	0	0	0	0	—		2	0
Omiya Ardija (loan)	2022	J2 League	26	0	2	0	—		—		28	0
RB Omiya Ardija	2023	J2 League	6	0	0	0	—		—		6	0
RB Omiya Ardija	2024	J3 League	0	0	2	0	0	0	—		2	0
RB Omiya Ardija	2025	J2 League	0	0	0	0	0	0	0	0	0	0
RB Omiya Ardija	2026	J2/J3	0	0	—		—		—		0	0
RB Omiya Ardija	Total		32	0	4	0	0	0	0	0	36	0
Career total			51	0	5	0	12	0	0	0	68	0
