= Lists of Japanese football transfers =

Below are lists of Japanese football transfers in the J.League divisions J1 League, J2 League and J3 League.

== 2009–2015 ==
- List of Japanese football transfers winter 2009–10
- List of Japanese football transfers winter 2010–11
- List of Japanese football transfers winter 2011–12
- List of Japanese football transfers summer 2012
- List of Japanese football transfers winter 2012–13
- List of Japanese football transfers summer 2013
- List of Japanese football transfers winter 2014–15
- List of Japanese football transfers summer 2015

== 2016 ==
- List of J1 League transfers winter 2015–16
- List of J2 League transfers winter 2015–16
- List of J3 League transfers winter 2015–16

== 2017 ==
- List of J1 League transfers winter 2016–17
- List of J2 League transfers winter 2016–17
- List of J3 League transfers winter 2016–17
- List of Japanese football transfers summer 2017

== 2018 ==
- List of J1 League football transfers winter 2017–18
- List of J2 League football transfers winter 2017–18
- List of J3 League football transfers winter 2017–18
- List of J1 League football transfers summer 2018
- List of J2 League football transfers summer 2018
- List of J3 League football transfers summer 2018

== 2019 ==
- List of J1 League football transfers winter 2018–19
- List of J2 League football transfers winter 2018–19
- List of J3 League football transfers winter 2018–19
- List of J1 League football transfers summer 2019
- List of J2 League football transfers summer 2019
- List of J3 League football transfers summer 2019

== 2020 ==
- List of J1 League football transfers winter 2019–20
- List of J2 League football transfers winter 2019–20
- List of J3 League football transfers winter 2019–20

== 2023 ==
- List of J1 League football transfers winter 2022–23
- List of J2 League football transfers winter 2022–23
- List of J3 League football transfers winter 2022–23
- List of Japan Football League football transfers winter 2022–23
- List of J1 League football transfers summer 2023
- List of J2 League football transfers summer 2023
- List of J3 League football transfers summer 2023

== 2024 ==
- List of J1 League football transfers winter 2023–24
- List of J2 League football transfers winter 2023–24
