= List of J3 League football transfers summer 2019 =

This is a list of Japanese football J3 League transfers in the summer transfer window 2019 by club.

== J3 League ==
=== Roasso Kumamoto ===
In: Note: Flags indicate national team as defined under FIFA eligibility rules; some limited exceptions apply. Players may hold more than one non-FIFA nationality.

No.	Pos.	Nation	Player

Out: Note: Flags indicate national team as defined under FIFA eligibility rules; some limited exceptions apply. Players may hold more than one non-FIFA nationality.

No.	Pos.	Nation	Player

=== Kamatamare Sanuki ===
In: Note: Flags indicate national team as defined under FIFA eligibility rules; some limited exceptions apply. Players may hold more than one non-FIFA nationality.

No.	Pos.	Nation	Player

Out: Note: Flags indicate national team as defined under FIFA eligibility rules; some limited exceptions apply. Players may hold more than one non-FIFA nationality.

No.	Pos.	Nation	Player

=== Gainare Tottori ===
In: Note: Flags indicate national team as defined under FIFA eligibility rules; some limited exceptions apply. Players may hold more than one non-FIFA nationality.

No.	Pos.	Nation	Player
31	GK	(Japan) JPN	Koshiro Itohara (from Biwako Seikei Sport College)
38	DF	(Japan) JPN	Keita Takahata (on loan from (Japan) Oita Trinita)
39	FW	(Japan) JPN	Kunitomo Suzuki (on loan from (Japan) Shonan Bellmare)

Out: Note: Flags indicate national team as defined under FIFA eligibility rules; some limited exceptions apply. Players may hold more than one non-FIFA nationality.

No.	Pos.	Nation	Player
31	GK	(Japan) JPN	Ayumu Hosoda (on loan to (Japan) Kochi United SC)

=== Azul Claro Numazu ===
In: Note: Flags indicate national team as defined under FIFA eligibility rules; some limited exceptions apply. Players may hold more than one non-FIFA nationality.

No.	Pos.	Nation	Player
36	FW	(Japan) JPN	Daichi Ishikawa (on loan from (Japan) FC Gifu)

Out: Note: Flags indicate national team as defined under FIFA eligibility rules; some limited exceptions apply. Players may hold more than one non-FIFA nationality.

No.	Pos.	Nation	Player

=== Thespakusatsu Gunma ===
In: Note: Flags indicate national team as defined under FIFA eligibility rules; some limited exceptions apply. Players may hold more than one non-FIFA nationality.

No.	Pos.	Nation	Player
27	FW	(Japan) JPN	Itsuki Enomoto (on loan from (Japan) Matsumoto Yamaga)
35	DF	(Japan) JPN	Go Iwase (on loan from (Japan) Kyoto Sanga)
39	DF	(Japan) JPN	Yu Tamura (on loan from (Japan) Montedio Yamagata)
41	MF	(Japan) JPN	Kyosuke Goto (on loan from (Japan) Ventforet Kofu)
50	MF	(Japan) JPN	Daisuke Sakai (on loan from (Japan) Oita Trinita)

Out: Note: Flags indicate national team as defined under FIFA eligibility rules; some limited exceptions apply. Players may hold more than one non-FIFA nationality.

No.	Pos.	Nation	Player
1	GK	(Japan) JPN	Yuto Koizumi (on loan to (Japan) Ventforet Kofu)
4	DF	(Japan) JPN	Daihachi Okamura (on loan to (Japan) Tegevajaro Miyazaki)
16	MF	(Japan) JPN	Kento Kato (on loan to (Japan) Veertien Mie)

=== Blaublitz Akita ===
In: Note: Flags indicate national team as defined under FIFA eligibility rules; some limited exceptions apply. Players may hold more than one non-FIFA nationality.

No.	Pos.	Nation	Player

Out: Note: Flags indicate national team as defined under FIFA eligibility rules; some limited exceptions apply. Players may hold more than one non-FIFA nationality.

No.	Pos.	Nation	Player

=== SC Sagamihara ===
In: Note: Flags indicate national team as defined under FIFA eligibility rules; some limited exceptions apply. Players may hold more than one non-FIFA nationality.

No.	Pos.	Nation	Player
2	FW	(Brazil) BRA	Guilherme (from (Japan) Tonan Maebashi)
28	FW	(Brazil) BRA	Vinícius (from (Brazil) Goiânia)
30	DF	(South Korea) KOR	Choi Ji-hyeok (from (Japan) Gimpo Citizen FC)
31	DF	(Japan) JPN	So Nakagawa (on loan from (Japan) Kashiwa Reysol)
32	GK	(Japan) JPN	Gaku Harada (on loan from (Japan) Yokohama F. Marinos)

Out: Note: Flags indicate national team as defined under FIFA eligibility rules; some limited exceptions apply. Players may hold more than one non-FIFA nationality.

No.	Pos.	Nation	Player
2	DF	(Brazil) BRA	Lucas (released)
9	FW	(Brazil) BRA	João Gabriel (on loan to (Japan) Tochigi City FC)
20	DF	(Brazil) BRA	Arthur (on loan to (Japan) Nankatsu SC)
21	GK	(Japan) JPN	Suguru Asanuma (on loan from (Japan) Tochigi SC)

=== Nagano Parceiro ===
In: Note: Flags indicate national team as defined under FIFA eligibility rules; some limited exceptions apply. Players may hold more than one non-FIFA nationality.

No.	Pos.	Nation	Player
33	DF	(Japan) JPN	Wakaba Shimoguchi (on loan from (Japan) Fagiano Okayama)
39	FW	(Japan) JPN	Keita Saito (on loan from (Japan) Mito HollyHock)

Out: Note: Flags indicate national team as defined under FIFA eligibility rules; some limited exceptions apply. Players may hold more than one non-FIFA nationality.

No.	Pos.	Nation	Player
15	DF	(Japan) JPN	Ryo Nishiguchi (on loan to (Japan) MIO Biwako Shiga)

=== Kataller Toyama ===
In: Note: Flags indicate national team as defined under FIFA eligibility rules; some limited exceptions apply. Players may hold more than one non-FIFA nationality.

No.	Pos.	Nation	Player
30	MF	(Japan) JPN	Reo Yasunaga (on loan from (Japan) Yokohama FC)
37	FW	(Japan) JPN	Shu Hiramatsu (on loan from (Japan) Albirex Niigata)

Out: Note: Flags indicate national team as defined under FIFA eligibility rules; some limited exceptions apply. Players may hold more than one non-FIFA nationality.

No.	Pos.	Nation	Player
10	MF	(Japan) JPN	Mizuki Arai (on loan to (Japan) Tokyo Verdy)

=== Fukushima United FC ===
In: Note: Flags indicate national team as defined under FIFA eligibility rules; some limited exceptions apply. Players may hold more than one non-FIFA nationality.

No.	Pos.	Nation	Player

Out: Note: Flags indicate national team as defined under FIFA eligibility rules; some limited exceptions apply. Players may hold more than one non-FIFA nationality.

No.	Pos.	Nation	Player

=== Iwate Grulla Morioka ===
In: Note: Flags indicate national team as defined under FIFA eligibility rules; some limited exceptions apply. Players may hold more than one non-FIFA nationality.

No.	Pos.	Nation	Player
15	DF	(China) CHN	Huang Xinpeng (from (China) Hangzhou Greentown)
28	FW	(Japan) JPN	Yuki Ogaki (on loan from (Japan) Nagoya Grampus)
37	FW	(China) CHN	Gao Tianyu (from (China) Hangzhou Greentown)

Out: Note: Flags indicate national team as defined under FIFA eligibility rules; some limited exceptions apply. Players may hold more than one non-FIFA nationality.

No.	Pos.	Nation	Player

=== YSCC Yokohama ===
In: Note: Flags indicate national team as defined under FIFA eligibility rules; some limited exceptions apply. Players may hold more than one non-FIFA nationality.

No.	Pos.	Nation	Player
28	MF	(Japan) JPN	Diego Taba (from Kokushikan University)
29	FW	(Japan) JPN	Kio Yamada (from (Germany) Bayer Leverkusen)

Out: Note: Flags indicate national team as defined under FIFA eligibility rules; some limited exceptions apply. Players may hold more than one non-FIFA nationality.

No.	Pos.	Nation	Player
—	GK	(Japan) JPN	Shunkun Tani (to (Chinese Taipei) Taichung Futuro)
14	FW	(Japan) JPN	Taisei Kaneko (to (Chinese Taipei) Taichung Futuro)

=== Fujieda MYFC ===
In: Note: Flags indicate national team as defined under FIFA eligibility rules; some limited exceptions apply. Players may hold more than one non-FIFA nationality.

No.	Pos.	Nation	Player
34	MF	(Japan) JPN	Takumi Kiyomoto (from (South Korea) Gangwon FC)
35	FW	(Japan) JPN	Tsubasa Yoshihira (on loan from (Japan) Oita Trinita)
36	DF	(Japan) JPN	Masahiro Nasukawa (from (Japan) Matsumoto Yamaga)

Out: Note: Flags indicate national team as defined under FIFA eligibility rules; some limited exceptions apply. Players may hold more than one non-FIFA nationality.

No.	Pos.	Nation	Player
18	FW	(Japan) JPN	Keisuke Endo (on loan to (Japan) Nara Club)

=== Giravanz Kitakyushu ===
In: Note: Flags indicate national team as defined under FIFA eligibility rules; some limited exceptions apply. Players may hold more than one non-FIFA nationality.

No.	Pos.	Nation	Player
28	FW	(Japan) JPN	Daigo Takahashi (on loan from (Japan) Shimizu S-Pulse)
30	FW	(Japan) JPN	Shuto Kitagawa (on loan from (Japan) Montedio Yamagata)
40	MF	(Japan) JPN	Naoki Tsubaki (on loan from (Japan) Yokohama F. Marinos)

Out: Note: Flags indicate national team as defined under FIFA eligibility rules; some limited exceptions apply. Players may hold more than one non-FIFA nationality.

No.	Pos.	Nation	Player

=== Vanraure Hachinohe ===
In: Note: Flags indicate national team as defined under FIFA eligibility rules; some limited exceptions apply. Players may hold more than one non-FIFA nationality.

No.	Pos.	Nation	Player
17	MF	(Japan) JPN	Yuto Sashinami (from (Croatia) NK BSK Belica)

Out: Note: Flags indicate national team as defined under FIFA eligibility rules; some limited exceptions apply. Players may hold more than one non-FIFA nationality.

No.	Pos.	Nation	Player
