= Yusuke Nishiyama =

Yusuke Nishiyama may refer to:

- Yusuke Nishiyama (footballer) (西山 雄介, born 1994), Japanese footballer
- Yusuke Nishiyama (runner) (西山 雄介, born 1994), Japanese long-distance runner
