= Samuel Alves =

Brazilian footballer (born 1991)

Personal information
- Full name: Samuel Henrique Alves
- Date of birth: 14 June 1991 (age 35)
- Place of birth: Belo Horizonte, Brazil
- Height: 1.71 m (5 ft 7 1/2 in)
- Position: Defender

Team information
- Current team: Maruyasu Okazaki (on loan from SC Sagamihara)
- Number: 6

Youth career
- –2006: Atlético Mineiro
- 2007–2008: Goiás
- 2009: Araxá
- 2010–2011: Goianiense

Senior career*
| Years | Team | Apps | (Gls) |
| 2012 | Guarany | 0 | (0) |
| 2012–2013 | Vitória de Sernache | 17 | (0) |
| 2014 | Toledo | 0 | (0) |
| 2014–2015 | Goianésia | 5 | (0) |
| 2015 | Ipatinga | 0 | (0) |
| 2015–2016 | Vitória de Sernache | 43 | (3) |
| 2017– | Sagamihara | 21 | (1) |
| 2018– | Maruyasu Okazaki (loan) | 11 | (0) |
- * Club domestic league appearances and goals as of 21:27, 8 April 2019 (UTC)

Samuel Henrique Alves (born 14 June 1991) is a Brazilian footballer who currently plays as a defender for Japanese side Maruyasu Okazaki, on loan from SC Sagamihara.

== Club career ==
Alves signed for Sagamihara in early 2017. He made his debut in a 1–0 loss to Nagano Parceiro.

== Career statistics ==
=== Club ===
As of 8 April 2019.

| Club | Season | League | | | Cup | | Other | | Total | |
| Club | Season | Division | Apps | Goals | Apps | Goals | Apps | Goals | Apps | Goals |
|---|---|---|---|---|---|---|---|---|---|---|
| Guarany | 2012 | Série C | 0 | 0 | 0 | 0 | 4 (Note: Appearances in the Campeonato Cearense) | 0 | 4 | 0 |
| Vitória de Sernache | 2012–13 | Campeonato de Portugal | 17 | 0 | 0 | 0 | 0 | 0 | 17 | 0 |
| Toledo | 2014 | – | | | 0 | 0 | 12 (Note: Appearances in the Campeonato Paranaense) | 1 | 12 | 1 |
| Goianésia | 2014 | Série D | 5 | 0 | 0 | 0 | 0 | 0 | 5 | 0 |
| Goianésia | 2015 | Série D | 0 | 0 | 0 | 0 | 1 (Note: Appearances in the Campeonato Goiano) | 0 | 1 | 0 |
| Goianésia | Total | | 5 | 0 | 0 | 0 | 1 | 0 | 6 | 0 |
| Ipatinga | 2015 | Série D | 0 | 0 | 0 | 0 | 2 (Note: Appearances in the Campeonato Mineiro Módulo 2) | 0 | 2 | 0 |
| Vitória de Sernache | 2015–16 | Campeonato de Portugal | 29 | 1 | 1 (Note: Appearances in the Taça de Portugal) | 0 | 0 | 0 | 30 | 1 |
| Vitória de Sernache | 2016–17 | Campeonato de Portugal | 14 | 2 | 3 | 1 | 0 | 0 | 17 | 3 |
| Vitória de Sernache | Total | | 43 | 3 | 4 | 1 | 0 | 0 | 47 | 4 |
| Sagamihara | 2017 | J3 League | 11 | 0 | 0 | 0 | 0 | 0 | 11 | 0 |
| Sagamihara | 2018 | J3 League | 10 | 1 | 0 | 0 | 0 | 0 | 10 | 1 |
| Sagamihara | Total | | 21 | 1 | 0 | 0 | 0 | 0 | 21 | 1 |
| Maruyasu Okazaki (loan) | 2018 | JFL | 11 | 0 | 0 | 0 | 0 | 0 | 11 | 0 |
| Total | Brazil | | 5 | 0 | 0 | 0 | 19 | 1 | 24 | 1 |
| Total | Portugal | | 60 | 3 | 4 | 1 | 0 | 0 | 64 | 4 |
| Total | Japan | | 32 | 1 | 0 | 0 | 0 | 0 | 32 | 1 |
| Total | Career total | | 97 | 4 | 4 | 1 | 19 | 1 | 120 | 6 |
