= 2015 Júbilo Iwata season =

Júbilo Iwata
2015 season
- Manager: Hiroshi Nanami
- Stadium: Yamaha Stadium
- J2 League: 2nd

The 2015 Júbilo Iwata season saw the club compete in the J2 League, the second-tier of Japanese football, in which they finished 2nd.

== J2 League ==
=== League table ===
Pos	Team	Pld	W	D	L	GF	GA	GD	Pts	Promotion, qualification or relegation
1	Omiya Ardija (C, P)	42	26	8	8	72	37	+35	86	Promotion to 2016 J1 League
2	Júbilo Iwata (P)	42	24	10	8	72	43	+29	82	Promotion to 2016 J1 League
3	Avispa Fukuoka (O, P)	42	24	10	8	63	37	+26	82	Qualification for promotion playoffs (Note: Only teams that meet J1 license criteria can participate in promotion playoffs. If one or more teams fail to meet the criteria, only eligible teams that finished 3rd to 6th will participate and no replacement teams will be added.)
4	Cerezo Osaka	42	18	13	11	57	40	+17	67	Qualification for promotion playoffs
5	Ehime FC	42	19	8	15	47	39	+8	65	Qualification for promotion playoffs

Source: Meiji Yasuda J2 League Standing
Rules for classification: 1) Points; 2) Goal difference; 3) Goals scored
(C) Champions; (O) Play-off winners; (P) Promoted

=== Match details ===
J2 League match details
Match	Date	Team	Score	Team	Venue	Attendance
1	2015.03.08	Júbilo Iwata	3-1	Giravanz Kitakyushu	Yamaha Stadium	10,438
2	2015.03.15	Kyoto Sanga FC	0-2	Júbilo Iwata	Kyoto Nishikyogoku Athletic Stadium	16,920
3	2015.03.21	Kamatamare Sanuki	1-0	Júbilo Iwata	Kagawa Marugame Stadium	4,334
4	2015.03.29	Júbilo Iwata	2-1	Oita Trinita	Yamaha Stadium	7,748
5	2015.04.01	Júbilo Iwata	3-0	Tochigi SC	Yamaha Stadium	6,946
6	2015.04.05	Yokohama FC	2-3	Júbilo Iwata	NHK Spring Mitsuzawa Football Stadium	5,921
7	2015.04.11	Júbilo Iwata	1-1	Fagiano Okayama	Yamaha Stadium	8,193
8	2015.04.19	Júbilo Iwata	2-0	Tokyo Verdy	Yamaha Stadium	8,173
9	2015.04.26	JEF United Chiba	0-2	Júbilo Iwata	Fukuda Denshi Arena	15,051
10	2015.04.29	Júbilo Iwata	0-1	Avispa Fukuoka	Yamaha Stadium	10,382
11	2015.05.03	Consadole Sapporo	3-0	Júbilo Iwata	Sapporo Dome	16,902
12	2015.05.06	Cerezo Osaka	1-2	Júbilo Iwata	Kincho Stadium	15,914
13	2015.05.09	Júbilo Iwata	2-1	Mito HollyHock	Yamaha Stadium	7,816
14	2015.05.17	Omiya Ardija	1-1	Júbilo Iwata	NACK5 Stadium Omiya	13,285
15	2015.05.24	Júbilo Iwata	1-2	Thespakusatsu Gunma	Yamaha Stadium	9,223
16	2015.05.31	Tokushima Vortis	2-2	Júbilo Iwata	Pocarisweat Stadium	5,606
17	2015.06.06	Júbilo Iwata	2-1	Zweigen Kanazawa	Yamaha Stadium	12,212
18	2015.06.14	V-Varen Nagasaki	0-1	Júbilo Iwata	Nagasaki Stadium	5,720
19	2015.06.21	Júbilo Iwata	2-3	FC Gifu	Yamaha Stadium	10,028
20	2015.06.28	Ehime FC	0-2	Júbilo Iwata	Ningineer Stadium	4,508
21	2015.07.04	Júbilo Iwata	1-1	Roasso Kumamoto	Yamaha Stadium	8,114
22	2015.07.08	Júbilo Iwata	1-1	Kamatamare Sanuki	Yamaha Stadium	5,875
23	2015.07.12	Tochigi SC	0-2	Júbilo Iwata	Tochigi Green Stadium	5,888
24	2015.07.18	Júbilo Iwata	1-0	JEF United Chiba	Yamaha Stadium	11,877
25	2015.07.22	FC Gifu	2-0	Júbilo Iwata	Gifu Nagaragawa Stadium	5,008
26	2015.07.26	Júbilo Iwata	0-1	Cerezo Osaka	Yamaha Stadium	12,868
27	2015.08.01	Fagiano Okayama	1-2	Júbilo Iwata	City Light Stadium	8,927
28	2015.08.08	Júbilo Iwata	3-3	Kyoto Sanga FC	Yamaha Stadium	10,391
29	2015.08.15	Avispa Fukuoka	2-0	Júbilo Iwata	Level5 Stadium	8,715
30	2015.08.23	Júbilo Iwata	3-1	Tokushima Vortis	Yamaha Stadium	9,435
31	2015.09.13	Zweigen Kanazawa	0-3	Júbilo Iwata	Ishikawa Athletics Stadium	12,353
32	2015.09.20	Júbilo Iwata	0-0	Ehime FC	Yamaha Stadium	12,058
33	2015.09.23	Thespakusatsu Gunma	2-3	Júbilo Iwata	Shoda Shoyu Stadium Gunma	11,303
34	2015.09.27	Giravanz Kitakyushu	2-3	Júbilo Iwata	Honjo Stadium	3,911
35	2015.10.04	Júbilo Iwata	2-2	Omiya Ardija	Yamaha Stadium	13,569
36	2015.10.10	Mito HollyHock	1-1	Júbilo Iwata	K's denki Stadium Mito	5,452
37	2015.10.18	Júbilo Iwata	3-0	Consadole Sapporo	Yamaha Stadium	11,179
38	2015.10.25	Roasso Kumamoto	0-2	Júbilo Iwata	Umakana-Yokana Stadium	12,404
39	2015.11.01	Tokyo Verdy	0-3	Júbilo Iwata	Ajinomoto Stadium	16,629
40	2015.11.08	Júbilo Iwata	4-2	V-Varen Nagasaki	Yamaha Stadium	10,764
41	2015.11.14	Júbilo Iwata	0-0	Yokohama FC	Yamaha Stadium	13,576
42	2015.11.23	Oita Trinita	1-2	Júbilo Iwata	Oita Bank Dome	10,508
