= Lucas (footballer, born 1996) =

Brazilian footballer

Personal information
- Full name: Lucas Carvalho da Silva
- Date of birth: 1 April 1996 (age 30)
- Place of birth: Rio de Janeiro, Brazil
- Height: 1.74 m (5 ft 9 in)
- Position: Right back

Team information
- Current team: Figueirense
- Number: 32

Youth career
- 2016: Fluminense

Senior career*
Years	Team	Apps	(Gls)
2015	Sampaio Corrêa-RJ	5	(0)
2017	Democrata		
2017	Tupi	23	(0)
2018	Cruzeiro-RS	11	(1)
2018	Veranópolis		
2019	Sagamihara	0	(0)
2020	São Luiz	9	(0)
2020–	Figueirense	0	(0)
- * Club domestic league appearances and goals as of 18:36, 13 June 2019 (UTC)

Lucas Carvalho da Silva (born 1 April 1996), commonly known as Lucas, is a Brazilian footballer who currently plays as a right back for Figueirense.

== Career statistics ==
=== Club ===
As of 13 June 2019.

Club	Season	League			State League		Cup		Continental		Other		Total	
Club	Season	Division	Apps	Goals	Apps	Goals	Apps	Goals	Apps	Goals	Apps	Goals	Apps	Goals
Sampaio Corrêa-RJ	2015	–			5 (Note: Appearances in the Campeonato Carioca A2)	0	0	0	–		0	0	5	0
Tupi	2017	Série C	18	0	5 (Note: Appearances in the Campeonato Mineiro)	0	0	0	–		0	0	23	0
Cruzeiro-RS	2018	–			11 (Note: Appearances in the Campeonato Gaúcho)	1	0	0	–		0	0	11	1
Sagamihara	2019	J3 League	0	0	–		0	0	–		0	0	0	0
Career total			18	0	21	1	0	0	0	0	0	0	39	1
