= 2023 Omiya Ardija season =

Omiya Ardija
2023 season
- Stadium: NACK5 Stadium Omiya
- J2 League: 10th
- Emperor's Cup: Second round
- All statistics correct as of May 2023.

The 2023 season was Omiya Ardija's 54th season in existence and the club's sixth consecutive season in the second division of Japanese football. In addition to the domestic league, Omiya Ardija participated in this season's edition of the Emperor's Cup.

== Transfers ==
=== In ===
Pos.	Player	Transferred from	Fee	Date	Source
GK	(Japan)	(Japan)			
GK	(Japan)	(Japan)			

=== Out ===
Pos.	Player	Transferred to	Fee	Date	Source
GK	(Japan)	(Japan)			
GK	(Japan)	(Japan)			

== Pre-season and friendlies ==
Win Draw Loss Fixtures

2023 Friendly	Omiya Ardija (Japan)	v	(Japan)	TBD
17:00

== Competitions ==
=== Overview ===
Competition	First match	Last match	Starting round	Record							
Competition	First match	Last match	Starting round	Pld	W	D	L	GF	GA	GD	Win %
J2 League	February 2023	12 November 2023	Matchday 1	0	0	0	0	0	0	+0	—
Emperor's Cup	7 June 2023		Second round	0	0	0	0	0	0	+0	—
Total				0	0	0	0	0	0	+0	—

Last updated: May 2023
Source: Soccerway

=== J2 League ===
==== League table ====
Pos	Team	Pld	W	D	L	GF	GA	GD	Pts	Promotion or relegation
18	Iwaki FC	42	12	11	19	45	69	−24	47	
19	Tochigi SC	42	10	14	18	39	47	−8	44	
20	Renofa Yamaguchi	42	10	14	18	37	67	−30	44	
21	Omiya Ardija (R)	42	11	6	25	37	71	−34	39	Relegation to J3 League
22	Zweigen Kanazawa (R)	42	9	8	25	41	70	−29	35	Relegation to J3 League

Source: Meiji Yasuda J2 League, J.League Data Site
Rules for classification: 1) Points; 2) Goal difference; 3) Goals scored; 4) Head-to-head points; 5) Head-to-head goal difference; 6) Head-to-head goal scored; 7) Fair-play points.
(R) Relegated

==== Results summary ====
Overall								Home						Away					
Pld	W	D	L	GF	GA	GD	Pts	W	D	L	GF	GA	GD	W	D	L	GF	GA	GD
0	0	0	0	0	0	0	0	0	0	0	0	0	0	0	0	0	0	0	0

Last updated: May 2023.
Source: Worldfootball

==== Results by round ====
Round	1	2	3	4	5	6	7	8	9	10	11	12	13	14	15	16	17
Ground	A	H	A	H	A	H	A	H	H	A	H	A	H	H	A	A	H
Result	L	W	L	W	L	W	L	W	L	L	L	L	L	L	D	L	
Position	20	9	15	10	12	7	10	7	14	15	17	18	19	21	21	22	

Updated to match(es) played on 17 May 2023. Source: Worldfootball
A = Away; H = Home; W = Win; D = Draw; L = Loss

==== Matches ====
The league fixtures were announced on 20 January 2023.

February 2023	Omiya Ardija	v
JST (UTC+9)

=== Emperor's Cup ===
7 June 2023 Second round	v
JST (UTC+9)
