= Park Jeong-su =

South Korean footballer

Park Jeong-su 박정수
Personal information
- Full name: Park Jeong-su
- Date of birth: April 12, 1994 (age 32)
- Place of birth: South Korea
- Height: 1.88 m (6 ft 2 in)
- Position: Defender

Youth career
- 2013–2015: Kyung Hee University

Senior career*
Years	Team	Apps	(Gls)
2016–2017	Yokohama F. Marinos	21	(1)
2018–2020	Kashiwa Reysol	26	(0)
2019–2020	→ Sagan Tosu (loan)	17	(0)
2021	Seongnam FC	2	(0)
- * Club domestic league appearances and goals as of 30 April 2021

Park Jeong-su (Korean: 박정수; born April 12, 1994) is a South Korean footballer who plays as a defender. His most recent club was Seongnam FC.

== Club statistics ==
Updated to end of 2021 season.

Club performance			League		Cup		League Cup		Continental		Total	
Season	Club	League	Apps	Goals	Apps	Goals	Apps	Goals	Apps	Goals	Apps	Goals
Japan			League		Emperor's Cup		J. League Cup		Asia		Total	
2016	Yokohama F. Marinos	J1 League	13	1	4	0	9	0	-		26	1
2017	Yokohama F. Marinos	J1 League	8	0	6	0	6	0	-		20	0
2018	Kashiwa Reysol	J1 League	23	0	2	0	2	0	6	0	33	0
2019	Kashiwa Reysol	J2 League	3	0	0	0	3	0	-		6	0
2019	Sagan Tosu	J1 League	9	0	2	0	0	0	-		11	0
2020	Sagan Tosu	J1 League	8	0	-		1	0	-		9	0
South Korea			League		FA Cup		League Cup		Asia		Total	
2021	Seongnam FC	K League 1	2	0	2	0	-		-		4	0
Career Total			66	1	16	0	21	0	6	0	109	1
