= Keiya Nakami =

Japanese footballer

Personal information
- Full name: Keiya Nakami
- Date of birth: September 23, 1991 (age 35)
- Place of birth: Utsunomiya, Tochigi, Japan
- Height: 1.77 m (5 ft 9 1/2 in)
- Position: Midfielder

Team information
- Current team: Matsumoto Yamaga FC
- Number: 13

Youth career
- 2007–2009: Gunma Ikuei Academy of Educational Foundation
- 2010–2013: Ryutsu Keizai University FC

Senior career*
Years	Team	Apps	(Gls)
2014–2015	Tochigi SC	56	(11)
2016–2017	Sagan Tosu	0	(0)
2016–2017	→ Zweigen Kanazawa (loan)	61	(14)
2018–	Matsumoto Yamaga FC	22	(0)
- * Club domestic league appearances and goals as of 29 December 2018

Keiya Nakami (中美 慶哉, Nakami Keiya; born September 23, 1991) is a Japanese football player. He plays for Matsumoto Yamaga FC.

== Club statistics ==
Updated to 23 February 2017.

Club performance			League		Cup		League Cup		Other		Total	
Season	Club	League	Apps	Goals	Apps	Goals	Apps	Goals	Apps	Goals	Apps	Goals
Japan			League		Emperor's Cup		J. League Cup		Other^{1}		Total	
2014	Tochigi SC	J2 League	15	1	0	0	–		–		15	1
2015	Tochigi SC	J2 League	41	10	1	0	–		–		42	10
2016	Sagan Tosu	J1 League	0	0	–		0	0	–		0	0
2016	Zweigen Kanazawa	J2 League	21	2	0	0	–		2	2	23	4
Total			77	13	1	0	0	0	2	2	80	15

^{1}Includes J3 Relegation Playoffs.
