= Masataka Kani =

Japanese footballer

Masataka Kani 可児 壮隆
Personal information
- Date of birth: 18 April 1991 (age 35)
- Place of birth: Yokohama, Kanagawa, Japan
- Height: 1.72 m (5 ft 8 in)
- Position: Midfielder

Team information
- Current team: Arawore Hachioji

Youth career
- 2004–2009: Kawasaki Frontale
- 2010–2013: Hannan University

Senior career*
Years	Team	Apps	(Gls)
2014–2017	Kawasaki Frontale	0	(0)
2015	→ Shonan Bellmare (loan)	9	(0)
2016	→ Zweigen Kanazawa (loan)	13	(0)
2017	→ FC Imabari (loan)	17	(2)
2018–2021	Gainare Tottori	116	(12)
2023	Nara Club	28	(0)
2024–	Arawore Hachioji		
Total		183	(14)
- * Club domestic league appearances and goals as of 14/1/24 @ 04:59(AEST)

Masataka Kani (可児 壮隆, Kani Masataka; born 18 April 1991) is a Japanese footballer who plays as a midfielder for Arawore Hachioji.

== Career statistics ==
As of 22 February 2018

Appearances and goals by club, season and competition
Club	Season	League			Emperor's Cup		J. League Cup		Total	
Club	Season	Division	Apps	Goals	Apps	Goals	Apps	Goals	Apps	Goals
Kawasaki Frontale	2014	J1 League	0	0	2	0	0	0	2	0
Shonan Bellmare	2015	J1 League	9	0	1	0	5	0	15	0
Zweigen Kanazawa	2016	J2 League	13	0	1	0	–		14	0
FC Imabari	2017	JFL	17	2	2	0	–		19	2
Total			39	2	6	0	5	0	50	2
