= 2016 Júbilo Iwata season =

Júbilo Iwata
2016 season
- Manager: Hiroshi Nanami
- Stadium: Yamaha Stadium
- J1 League: 13th

The 2016 Júbilo Iwata season saw the club compete in the J1 League, the top tier of Japanese football, in which they finished 13th.

== J1 League ==
=== League table ===
| Pos | Team | Pld | W | D | L | GF | GA | GD | Pts |
|---|---|---|---|---|---|---|---|---|---|
| 11 | Sagan Tosu | 34 | 12 | 10 | 12 | 36 | 37 | −1 | 46 |
| 12 | Vegalta Sendai | 34 | 13 | 4 | 17 | 39 | 48 | −9 | 43 |
| 13 | Júbilo Iwata | 34 | 8 | 12 | 14 | 37 | 50 | −13 | 36 |
| 14 | Ventforet Kofu | 34 | 7 | 10 | 17 | 32 | 58 | −26 | 31 |
| 15 | Albirex Niigata | 34 | 8 | 6 | 20 | 33 | 49 | −16 | 30 |

Source: Meiji Yasuda J1 League
Rules for classification: 1) Points; 2) Goal difference; 3) Goals scored.

=== Match details ===
J1 League match details
| Match | Date | Team | Score | Team | Venue | Attendance |
|---|---|---|---|---|---|---|
| 1-1 | 2016.02.27 | Júbilo Iwata | 0-1 | Nagoya Grampus | Yamaha Stadium | 14,333 |
| 1-2 | 2016.03.06 | Urawa Reds | 1-2 | Júbilo Iwata | Saitama Stadium 2002 | 43,826 |
| 1-3 | 2016.03.12 | Kashiwa Reysol | 2-2 | Júbilo Iwata | Hitachi Kashiwa Stadium | 10,280 |
| 1-4 | 2016.03.19 | Júbilo Iwata | 2-2 | Avispa Fukuoka | Yamaha Stadium | 11,002 |
| 1-5 | 2016.04.02 | Omiya Ardija | 1-1 | Júbilo Iwata | NACK5 Stadium Omiya | 11,271 |
| 1-6 | 2016.04.10 | Albirex Niigata | 1-2 | Júbilo Iwata | Denka Big Swan Stadium | 18,210 |
| 1-7 | 2016.04.16 | Júbilo Iwata | 1-5 | Yokohama F. Marinos | Yamaha Stadium | 14,385 |
| 1-8 | 2016.04.24 | Sagan Tosu | 0-1 | Júbilo Iwata | Best Amenity Stadium | 9,332 |
| 1-9 | 2016.04.29 | Júbilo Iwata | 1-0 | Sanfrecce Hiroshima | Yamaha Stadium | 14,379 |
| 1-10 | 2016.05.04 | Vissel Kobe | 4-1 | Júbilo Iwata | Noevir Stadium Kobe | 17,038 |
| 1-11 | 2016.05.08 | Júbilo Iwata | 1-1 | Kashima Antlers | Yamaha Stadium | 14,155 |
| 1-12 | 2016.05.13 | Gamba Osaka | 2-1 | Júbilo Iwata | Suita City Football Stadium | 17,299 |
| 1-13 | 2016.05.21 | Júbilo Iwata | 3-1 | Ventforet Kofu | Yamaha Stadium | 13,616 |
| 1-14 | 2016.05.29 | Kawasaki Frontale | 1-0 | Júbilo Iwata | Kawasaki Todoroki Stadium | 21,373 |
| 1-15 | 2016.06.11 | Júbilo Iwata | 0-0 | FC Tokyo | Shizuoka Stadium | 20,969 |
| 1-16 | 2016.06.18 | Shonan Bellmare | 1-0 | Júbilo Iwata | Shonan BMW Stadium Hiratsuka | 11,341 |
| 1-17 | 2016.06.25 | Júbilo Iwata | 3-0 | Vegalta Sendai | Yamaha Stadium | 12,070 |
| 2-1 | 2016.07.02 | Sanfrecce Hiroshima | 3-0 | Júbilo Iwata | Edion Stadium Hiroshima | 14,502 |
| 2-2 | 2016.07.09 | Júbilo Iwata | 1-1 | Omiya Ardija | Yamaha Stadium | 10,416 |
| 2-3 | 2016.07.13 | Ventforet Kofu | 0-0 | Júbilo Iwata | Yamanashi Chuo Bank Stadium | 7,064 |
| 2-4 | 2016.07.17 | Júbilo Iwata | 1-1 | Kawasaki Frontale | Yamaha Stadium | 14,837 |
| 2-5 | 2016.07.23 | Yokohama F. Marinos | 1-1 | Júbilo Iwata | Nissan Stadium | 23,028 |
| 2-6 | 2016.07.30 | Júbilo Iwata | 1-2 | Kashiwa Reysol | Yamaha Stadium | 14,353 |
| 2-7 | 2016.08.06 | FC Tokyo | 3-2 | Júbilo Iwata | Ajinomoto Stadium | 28,291 |
| 2-8 | 2016.08.13 | Júbilo Iwata | 0-2 | Gamba Osaka | Shizuoka Stadium | 23,144 |
| 2-9 | 2016.08.20 | Júbilo Iwata | 1-1 | Sagan Tosu | Yamaha Stadium | 11,238 |
| 2-10 | 2016.08.24 | Avispa Fukuoka | 2-3 | Júbilo Iwata | Level5 Stadium | 10,059 |
| 2-11 | 2016.09.10 | Júbilo Iwata | 3-4 | Vissel Kobe | Yamaha Stadium | 12,314 |
| 2-12 | 2016.09.17 | Kashima Antlers | 3-0 | Júbilo Iwata | Kashima Soccer Stadium | 15,787 |
| 2-13 | 2016.09.25 | Júbilo Iwata | 0-0 | Shonan Bellmare | Yamaha Stadium | 11,749 |
| 2-14 | 2016.10.01 | Júbilo Iwata | 1-2 | Albirex Niigata | Yamaha Stadium | 10,525 |
| 2-15 | 2016.10.22 | Nagoya Grampus | 1-1 | Júbilo Iwata | Toyota Stadium | 30,282 |
| 2-16 | 2016.10.29 | Júbilo Iwata | 0-1 | Urawa Reds | Shizuoka Stadium | 24,896 |
| 2-17 | 2016.11.03 | Vegalta Sendai | 0-1 | Júbilo Iwata | Yurtec Stadium Sendai | 19,315 |
