= Teppei Usui =

Japanese footballer

Personal information
- Date of birth: 3 November 1991 (age 35)
- Place of birth: Fuchū, Tokyo, Japan
- Height: 1.74 m (5 ft 9 in)
- Position: Midfielder

Team information
- Current team: AC Nagano Parceiro
- Number: 40

Youth career
- 2004–2006: FC Tokyo
- 2007–2009: Yamanashi Gakuin Junior High; School and Senior High School
- 2010–2013: Komazawa University

Senior career*
Years	Team	Apps	(Gls)
2014–2019	V-Varen Nagasaki	20	(0)
2016	→ Nagano Parceiro (loan)		
2018	→ Thespakusatsu Gunma (loan)	16	(1)
2019	→ Kataller Toyama (loan)	32	(1)
2020–2022	Kataller Toyama	23	(0)
2023–	AC Nagano Parceiro	0	(0)
- * Club domestic league appearances and goals as of 20:11, 13 January 2021 (UTC)

Teppei Usui (碓井鉄平, Usui Teppei; born 3 November 1991 in Fuchū, Tokyo) is a Japanese footballer who plays for AC Nagano Parceiro.

== Club statistics ==
Updated to 23 February 2016.

Club performance			League		Cup		Total	
Season	Club	League	Apps	Goals	Apps	Goals	Apps	Goals
Japan			League		Emperor's Cup		Total	
2014	V-Varen Nagasaki	J2 League	1	0	1	0	2	0
2015	V-Varen Nagasaki	J2 League	3	0	2	0	5	0
Career total			4	0	3	0	7	0
