= Keisuke Endo =

Japanese footballer (born 1989)

Keisuke Endo 遠藤 敬佑
Personal information
- Full name: Keisuke Endo
- Date of birth: March 20, 1989 (age 37)
- Place of birth: Ichihara, Chiba, Japan
- Height: 1.80 m (5 ft 11 in)
- Positions: Forward; winger

Team information
- Current team: Vonds Ichihara
- Number: 19

Youth career
- 2001–2006: JEF United Chiba

Senior career*
Years	Team	Apps	(Gls)
2007–2011	Mito HollyHock	142	(10)
2012–2013	Thespa Kusatsu	53	(1)
2014–2016	Machida Zelvia	41	(6)
2016	→ Fujieda MYFC (loan)	27	(6)
2017–2019	Fujieda MYFC	39	(14)
2018	→ Kataller Toyama (loan)	8	(2)
2019	→ Nara Club (loan)	12	(2)
2020–	Vonds Ichihara	3	(0)

International career
2008	Japan U-19	2	(0)
- * Club domestic league appearances and goals as of 14:17, 3 January 2021 (UTC)

Keisuke Endo (遠藤 敬佑, Endō Keisuke; born March 20, 1989) is a Japanese footballer who plays for Nara Club.

== Career ==
On 22 July 2019, Endo joined Nara Club.

== Club statistics ==
Updated to 23 February 2020.

Club performance			League		Cup		Total	
Season	Club	League	Apps	Goals	Apps	Goals	Apps	Goals
Japan			League		Emperor's Cup		Total	
2007	Mito HollyHock	J2 League	16	0	0	0	16	0
2008	Mito HollyHock	J2 League	19	0	0	0	19	0
2009	Mito HollyHock	J2 League	46	7	1	0	48	6
2010	Mito HollyHock	J2 League	34	2	2	0	36	2
2011	Mito HollyHock	J2 League	27	1	1	0	28	1
2012	Thespa Kusatsu	J2 League	37	1	1	0	38	1
2013	Thespa Kusatsu	J2 League	16	0	0	0	16	0
2014	Machida Zelvia	J3 League	22	6	-		22	6
2015	Machida Zelvia	J3 League	19	0	3	0	22	0
2016	Fujieda MYFC	J3 League	27	6	0	0	27	6
2017	Fujieda MYFC	J3 League	26	12	-		26	12
2018	Kataller Toyama	J3 League	8	2	1	0	9	2
2018	Fujieda MYFC	J3 League	12	2	-		12	2
2019	Fujieda MYFC	J3 League	1	0	-		1	0
2019	Nara Club	JFL	12	2	-		12	2
Career total			322	40	9	0	331	40
