= Yusuke Nishiyama (footballer) =

Japanese footballer

Yusuke Nishiyama 西山 雄介
Personal information
- Full name: Yusuke Nishiyama
- Date of birth: September 18, 1994 (age 32)
- Place of birth: Tokyo, Japan
- Height: 1.82 m (5 ft 11 1/2 in)
- Position: Defender

Team information
- Current team: Essendon Royals

Youth career
- 2010–2012: Yokogawa Musashino Youth
- 2013–2016: Yamanashi Gakuin University

Senior career*
Years	Team	Apps	(Gls)
2015–2016	→ Ventforet Kofu (loan)	0	(0)
2017–2018	YSCC Yokohama	22	(2)
2018–2020	Gainare Tottori	33	(7)
2021	Musashino United	22	(1)
2022	YSCC Yokohama	5	(1)
2023–2024	Banyule City		
2024–	Essendon Royals		
- * Club domestic league appearances and goals as of 20 November 2022

Yusuke Nishiyama (西山 雄介, Nishiyama Yūsuke; born September 18, 1994) is a Japanese football player who plays for Australian club Essendon Royals.

== Career ==
Yusuke Nishiyama joined J3 League club YSCC Yokohama in 2017.

== Club statistics ==
Updated to 13 August 2018.

Club performance			League		Cup		Total	
Season	Club	League	Apps	Goals	Apps	Goals	Apps	Goals
Japan			League		Emperor's Cup		Total	
2017	YSCC Yokohama	J3 League	12	1	0	0	12	1
2018	YSCC Yokohama	J3 League	10	1	1	0	11	1
2018	Gainare Tottori	J3 League			-			
Total			22	1	1	0	23	2
