= Naoya Uozato =

Japanese footballer

Naoya Uozato 魚里 直哉
Personal information
- Full name: Naoya Uozato
- Date of birth: August 3, 1995 (age 31)
- Place of birth: Sumoto, Hyōgo, Japan
- Height: 1.71 m (5 ft 7 1/2 in)
- Position: Midfielder

Team information
- Current team: Tegevajaro Miyazaki
- Number: 7

Youth career
- 2003–2007: Sumoto FC
- 2008–2010: Seiun Junior High School
- 2011–2013: Cerezo Osaka

College career
Years	Team	Apps	(Gls)
2014–2017	Kwansei Gakuin University		

Senior career*
Years	Team	Apps	(Gls)
2018	Cerezo Osaka	0	(0)
2018	→ Cerezo Osaka U-23 (loan)	18	(1)
2018–2023	Gainare Tottori	126	(6)
2023	Fujieda MYFC	0	(0)
2024–	Tegevajaro Miyazaki	18	(0)
- * Club domestic league appearances and goals as of 1 January 2026

Naoya Uozato (魚里直哉, Uozato Naoya; born August 3, 1995) is a Japanese football player for Tegevajaro Miyazaki.

== Career ==
After an initial stint with Cerezo Osaka, Uozato moved to Gainare Tottori with a full transfer in August 2018.

== Club statistics ==
Updated to 22 August 2018.

Club performance			League		Cup		League Cup		Continental		Total	
Season	Club	League	Apps	Goals	Apps	Goals	Apps	Goals	Apps	Goals	Apps	Goals
Japan			League		Emperor's Cup		J. League Cup		AFC		Total	
2018	Cerezo Osaka	J1 League	0	0	0	0	0	0	0	0	0	0
2018	Cerezo Osaka	J3 League	18	1	–		–		–		18	1
2018	Gainare Tottori	J3 League	0	0	–		–		–		0	0
Total			18	1	0	0	0	0	0	0	18	1
