= Jin Ikoma =

Japanese footballer

Personal information
- Date of birth: 1 July 1999 (age 27)
- Place of birth: Kagoshima Prefecture, Japan
- Height: 1.84 m (6 ft 0 in)
- Position: Defender

Team information
- Current team: Giravanz Kitakyushu (on loan from Iwaki FC)
- Number: 22

Youth career
- –2011: FC Makurazaki
- 2012–2014: Kagoshima Ikueikan Junior High School
- 2015–2017: Kagoshima Josei High School

Senior career*
| Years | Team | Apps | (Gls) |
| 2018–2021 | Yokohama F. Marinos | 0 | (0) |
| 2018 | → Kataller Toyama (loan) | 0 | (0) |
| 2019–2021 | → Giravanz Kitakyushu (loan) | 46 | (1) |
| 2022–2023 | Renofa Yamaguchi | 47 | (3) |
| 2024– | Iwaki FC | 23 | (0) |
| 2026– | → Giravanz Kitakyushu (loan) | 13 | (1) |
Medal record
Yokohama F. Marinos
| Runner-up | J.League Cup | 2018 |
- * Club domestic league appearances and goals as of 24 August 2026

Jin Ikoma (生駒 仁, Ikoma Jin; born 1 July 1999) is a Japanese professional footballer who plays as a defender for Giravanz Kitakyushu, on loan from Iwaki FC.
