= 2018 Vissel Kobe season =

Vissel Kobe
2018 season
- Chairman: Katsuhiro Shimizu
- Manager: Takayuki Yoshida
- J1 League: 10th
- Emperor's Cup: Fourth round
- J. League Cup: Quarter-final
- Top goalscorer: League: Hirotaka Mita (6 goals); All: Wellington (11 goals)
- Highest home attendance: 26,603 (vs. Sagan Tosu, 10 November, J1 League)
- Lowest home attendance: 2,202 (vs. Fukuoka University, 6 June, Emperor's Cup)
Home colours	Away colours	Third colours

The 2018 Vissel Kobe season was Vissel Kobe's fifth season back in the J1 League following their promotion in 2013 and their 20th J1 League season. They also competed in the 2018 Emperor's Cup and the 2018 J.League Cup.

== Squad ==
As of 14 August 2018.

Note: Flags indicate national team as defined under FIFA eligibility rules; some limited exceptions apply. Players may hold more than one non-FIFA nationality.

No.	Pos.	Nation	Player
1	GK	(Japan) JPN	Daiya Maekawa
2	DF	(Japan) JPN	Daisuke Nasu
3	DF	(Japan) JPN	Hirofumi Watanabe
4	DF	(Japan) JPN	Kunie Kitamoto
5	DF	(Qatar) QAT	Ahmed Yasser (on loan from Al-Duhail)
6	DF	(Japan) JPN	Shunki Takahashi
7	MF	(Japan) JPN	Hirotaka Mita
8	MF	(Spain) ESP	Andrés Iniesta
10	FW	(Germany) GER	Lukas Podolski (Captain)
14	MF	(Japan) JPN	Naoyuki Fujita
15	DF	(Japan) JPN	Daiki Miya
16	FW	(Japan) JPN	Kyogo Furuhashi
17	FW	(Brazil) BRA	Wellington
18	GK	(South Korea) KOR	Kim Seung-gyu

No.	Pos.	Nation	Player
20	MF	(Japan) JPN	Asahi Masuyama
21	FW	(Japan) JPN	Junya Tanaka
22	DF	(Japan) JPN	Wataru Hashimoto
23	MF	(Japan) JPN	Yoshiki Matsushita
24	MF	(Japan) JPN	Masatoshi Mihara
25	DF	(Japan) JPN	Leo Osaki
27	MF	(Japan) JPN	Yuta Goke
29	GK	(Japan) JPN	Kota Ogi
30	DF	(Thailand) THA	Theerathon Bunmathan (on loan from Muangthong United)
33	FW	(Japan) JPN	Shuhei Otsuki
34	DF	(Japan) JPN	So Fujitani
35	MF	(Japan) JPN	Takuya Yasui
39	DF	(Japan) JPN	Masahiko Inoha
40	DF	(Japan) JPN	Yuki Kobayashi
50	FW	(Japan) JPN	Shun Nagasawa

=== Out on loan ===
Note: Flags indicate national team as defined under FIFA eligibility rules; some limited exceptions apply. Players may hold more than one non-FIFA nationality.

No.	Pos.	Nation	Player
—	GK	(Japan) JPN	Kenshin Yoshimaru (at Tokushima Vortis)
—	DF	(Japan) JPN	Junya Higashi (at Fukushima United)
—	DF	(Japan) JPN	Shinji Yamaguchi (at Oita Trinita)
—	MF	(Japan) JPN	Seigo Kobayashi (at Montedio Yamagata)
—	MF	(Japan) JPN	Ryosuke Maeda (at Oita Trinita)
—	MF	(Japan) JPN	Yuya Nakasaka (at Peralada-Girona B)

No.	Pos.	Nation	Player
—	MF	(Brazil) BRA	Wescley (at Ceará)
—	FW	(Japan) JPN	Daiju Sasaki (at Palmeiras)
—	FW	(Japan) JPN	Akito Mukai (at MIO Biwako)
—	FW	(Japan) JPN	Keijiro Ogawa (at Shonan Bellmare)
—	FW	(Japan) JPN	Mike Havenaar (at Vegalta Sendai)

== Transfers ==
=== Winter ===
In: Note: Flags indicate national team as defined under FIFA eligibility rules; some limited exceptions apply. Players may hold more than one non-FIFA nationality.

No.	Pos.	Nation	Player
2	DF	(Japan) JPN	Daisuke Nasu (from (Japan) Urawa Red Diamonds)
5	MF	(South Korea) KOR	Jung Woo-young (from (China) Chongqing Lifan)
8	MF	(Japan) JPN	Hirotaka Mita (from (Japan) Vegalta Sendai)
15	DF	(Japan) JPN	Daiki Miya (from Biwako Seikei Sport College)
17	FW	(Brazil) BRA	Wellington (from (Japan) Avispa Fukuoka)
27	MF	(Japan) JPN	Yuta Goke (from Aomori Yamada High School)
29	GK	(Japan) JPN	Kota Ogi (from (Japan) Nagoya Grampus)
30	DF	(Thailand) THA	Theerathon Bunmathan (on loan from (Thailand) Muangthong United)
36	FW	(Japan) JPN	Tatsuki Noda (from (Japan) FC Imabari, end of loan)
38	FW	(Japan) JPN	Daiji Sasaki (promoted from youth ranks)

Out: Note: Flags indicate national team as defined under FIFA eligibility rules; some limited exceptions apply. Players may hold more than one non-FIFA nationality.

No.	Pos.	Nation	Player
5	DF	(Japan) JPN	Takuya Iwanami (to (Japan) Urawa Red Diamonds)
7	MF	(Brazil) BRA	Nílton (to (Brazil) EC Bahia)
8	MF	(Brazil) BRA	Wescley (on loan to (Brazil) Ceará)
15	MF	(Japan) JPN	Seigo Kobayashi (on loan to (Japan) Montedio Yamagata)
16	MF	(Japan) JPN	Hideto Takahashi (to (Japan) Sagan Tosu)
17	MF	(Japan) JPN	Hideo Tanaka (to (Japan) Tegevajaro Miyazaki)
25	DF	(Japan) JPN	Junya Higashi (on loan to (Japan) Fukushima United FC)
26	DF	(Japan) JPN	Shinji Yamaguchi (on loan to (Japan) Oita Trinita)
29	MF	(Japan) JPN	Kotaro Omori (to (Japan) FC Tokyo)
30	GK	(Japan) JPN	Kenta Tokushige (to (Japan) V-Varen Nagasaki)
—	MF	(Japan) JPN	Ryo Matsumura (to (Japan) Nagano Parceiro)
—	FW	(Japan) JPN	Akito Mukai (on loan to (Japan) MIO Biwako Shiga)

=== Summer ===
In: Note: Flags indicate national team as defined under FIFA eligibility rules; some limited exceptions apply. Players may hold more than one non-FIFA nationality.

No.	Pos.	Nation	Player
5	DF	(Qatar) QAT	Ahmed Yasser (on loan from (Qatar) Al-Duhail SC)
8	MF	(Spain) ESP	Andrés Iniesta (from (Spain) Barcelona)
16	FW	(Japan) JPN	Kyogo Furuhashi (from (Japan) FC Gifu)
20	FW	(Japan) JPN	Shun Nagasawa (on loan from (Japan) Gamba Osaka)
25	DF	(Japan) JPN	Leo Osaki (from (Japan) Tokushima Vortis)

Out: Note: Flags indicate national team as defined under FIFA eligibility rules; some limited exceptions apply. Players may hold more than one non-FIFA nationality.

No.	Pos.	Nation	Player
5	MF	(South Korea) KOR	Jung Woo-young (to (Qatar) Al-Sadd)
9	FW	(Japan) JPN	Mike Havenaar (on loan to (Japan) Vegalta Sendai)
11	FW	(Brazil) BRA	Leandro (to (Japan) Tokyo Verdy)
13	FW	(Japan) JPN	Keijiro Ogawa (on loan to (Japan) Shonan Bellmare)
19	FW	(Japan) JPN	Kazuma Watanabe (to (Japan) Gamba Osaka)
28	GK	(Japan) JPN	Kenshin Yoshimaru (on loan to (Japan) Tokushima Vortis)
31	MF	(Japan) JPN	Yuya Nakasaka (on loan to (Spain) CF Peralada-Girona B)
36	MF	(Japan) JPN	Tatsuki Noda (on loan to (Japan) Kataller Toyama)
38	MF	(Japan) JPN	Daiju Sasaki (on loan to (Brazil) Palmeiras)

== Competitions ==
=== J. League ===
==== Table ====
Pos	Team	Pld	W	D	L	GF	GA	GD	Pts
8	Shimizu S-Pulse	34	14	7	13	56	48	+8	49
9	Gamba Osaka	34	14	6	14	41	46	−5	48
10	Vissel Kobe	34	12	9	13	45	52	−7	45
11	Vegalta Sendai	34	13	6	15	44	54	−10	45
12	Yokohama F. Marinos	34	12	5	17	56	56	0	41

Source: Meiji Yasuda J1 League
Rules for classification: 1) Points; 2) Goal difference; 3) Goals scored

==== Results summary ====
Overall								Home						Away					
Pld	W	D	L	GF	GA	GD	Pts	W	D	L	GF	GA	GD	W	D	L	GF	GA	GD
24	10	6	8	31	26	+5	36	5	2	5	18	16	+2	5	4	3	13	10	+3

Last updated: 26 August 2018.
Source: see below

==== Results by round ====
Round	1	2	3	4	5	6	7	8	9	10	11	12	13	14	15	16	17	18	19	20	21	22	23	24	25	26	27	28	29	30	31	32	33	34
Ground	A	H	A	H	A	A	H	A	H	A	H	H	A	A	H	A	H	H	A	A	H	H	A	H										
Result	D	L	D	W	L	W	L	W	W	D	L	D	L	W	W	W	L	W	D	L	W	D	W	L										
Position	6	15	14	8	13	10	9	9	7	6	8	8	10	7	6	6	6	4	5	5	4	4	4	5										10

Updated to match(es) played on 26 August 2018. Source: See Below
A = Away; H = Home; W = Win; D = Draw; L = Loss

==== Results ====
23 February 2018 1	Sagan Tosu	1 – 1	Vissel Kobe	Tosu
20:00 JST (UTC+9)	Tagawa 3' (pen.); Takahashi (yellow card) 67'	Report	Nasu (yellow card) 2'; Matsushita (yellow card) 31'; Podolski (yellow card) 67'; Havenaar 87'; H.Watanabe (yellow card) 90+2'	Stadium: Best Amenity Stadium; Attendance: 19,633; Referee: Yuichi Nishimura

3 March 2018 2	Vissel Kobe	2 – 4	Shimizu S-Pulse	Kobe
16:00 JST (UTC+9)	Tanaka 32'; Podolski (yellow card) 39'; Jung (yellow card) 60' (goal) 69'; Havenaar (yellow card) 74'	Report	Freire (yellow card) 6'; Crislan 13'; Kaneko 26'; Tatsuta 72'; Kitagawa 82'; Rokutan (yellow card) 84'; Jong (yellow card) 90'	Stadium: Noevir Stadium Kobe; Attendance: 24,058; Referee: Akihiro Ikeuchi

10 March 2018 3	Vegalta Sendai	1 – 1	Vissel Kobe	Sendai
14:00 JST (UTC+9)	Kobayashi (yellow card) 58'; Ishihara 86'	Report	Tanaka (yellow card) 3'; Mihara 27'; Jung (yellow card) 56'; Bunmathan (yellow card) 68'	Stadium: Yurtec Stadium Sendai; Attendance: 14,270; Referee: Futoshi Nakamura

18 March 2018 4	Vissel Kobe	2 – 0	Cerezo Osaka	Kobe
16:00 JST (UTC+9)	Fujita 34'; Podolski (yellow card) 53' (goal) 83'	Report	Osmar (yellow card) 21'; Matsuda (yellow card) 72'	Stadium: Noevir Stadium Kobe; Attendance: 20,108; Referee: Jumpei Iida

30 March 2018 5	Kashiwa Reysol	2 – 1	Vissel Kobe	Kashiwa
19:30 JST (UTC+9)	Yun (yellow card) 35'; Koizumi (yellow card) 43'; Nakatani (yellow card) 51'; Ito 68', 86'	Report	Mihara (yellow card) 23'; Mita (yellow card) 57'; Tanaka 74'	Stadium: Sankyo Frontier Kashiwa Stadium; Attendance: 9,642; Referee: Yoshiro Imamura

8 April 2018 6	Gamba Osaka	0 – 1	Vissel Kobe	Suita
15:00 JST (UTC+9)		Report	Mihara (yellow card) 70'; Otsuki 90+5'	Stadium: Panasonic Stadium Suita; Attendance: 20,606; Referee: Minoru Tojo

11 April 2018 7	Vissel Kobe	2 – 3	Urawa Red Diamonds	Kobe
19:00 JST (UTC+9)	Hashimoto (yellow card) 15'; Wellington 51'; Sasaki 63'; Podolski (yellow card) 75'	Report	Muto 24'; Iwanami 72'; Jung 90+2' (o.g.)	Stadium: Noevir Stadium Kobe; Attendance: 9,758; Referee: Hiroyuki Kimura

15 April 2018 8	Yokohama F. Marinos	1 – 2	Vissel Kobe	Yokohama
14:00 JST (UTC+9)	Boumal 58'; Nakazawa (yellow card) 69'	Report	Mita 67'; K.Watanabe 79'	Stadium: Nissan Stadium; Attendance: 16,313; Referee: Ryuji Sato

21 April 2018 9	Vissel Kobe	3 – 0	Nagoya Grampus	Kobe
16:00 JST (UTC+9)	Jung 12'; Podolski 51', 81'	Report	Washington (yellow card) 30'; Gabriel Xavier (yellow card) 35'; Kobayashi (yellow card) 51'; Hasegawa (yellow card) 90+4'	Stadium: Noevir Stadium Kobe; Attendance: 18,681; Referee: Masuya Ueda

25 April 2018 10	Kashima Antlers	1 – 1	Vissel Kobe	Kashima
19:00 JST (UTC+9)	Suzuki 55'	Report	Yasui (yellow card) 22'; Mita 34'; Podolski (yellow card) 47'; H.Watanabe (yellow card) 88'	Stadium: Kashima Soccer Stadium; Attendance: Hajime Matsuo; Referee: 7,672

28 April 2018 11	Vissel Kobe	1 – 2	Kawasaki Frontale	Kobe
16:00 JST (UTC+9)	Jung (yellow card) 43' (yellow-red card) 81'; Mita (yellow card) 69' (goal) 78'	Report	Taniguchi 7'; Kobayashi 88'	Stadium: Noevir Stadium Kobe; Attendance: 19,847; Referee: Jumpei Iida

2 May 2018 12	Vissel Kobe	0 – 0	Tokyo	Kobe
19:00 JST (UTC+9)	Wellington (yellow card) 63'; Fujita (yellow card) 90+1'	Report	Omori (yellow card) 3'; Nagai (yellow card) 45+1'; Maeda (yellow card) 75'	Stadium: Noevir Stadium Kobe; Attendance: 9,015; Referee: Takuto Okabe

6 May 2018 13	Sanfrecce Hiroshima	2 – 0	Vissel Kobe	Hiroshima
17:00 JST (UTC+9)	Aoyama 44' (pen.); Patric 90+3'	Report	Fujita (yellow card) 21'; Hashimoto (yellow card) 74'; H.Watanabe (yellow card) 85'	Stadium: Edion Stadium Hiroshima; Attendance: 11,100; Referee: Akihiro Ikeuchi

12 May 2018 14	Júbilo Iwata	0 – 2	Vissel Kobe	Iwata
14:00 JST (UTC+9)		Report	K.Watanabe 11'; Wellington 25'; Mita (yellow card) 68'	Stadium: Yamaha Stadium; Attendance: 14,912; Referee: Hiroyuki Kimura

20 May 2018 15	Vissel Kobe	4 – 0	Hokkaido Consadole Sapporo	Kobe
17:00 JST (UTC+9)	Wellington 9', 23' (yellow card) 66'; K.Watanabe 55', 87'	Report	Miyazawa (yellow card) 38' (yellow-red card) 73'; Kim (yellow card) 57' (yellow-red card) 69'; Fukumori (yellow card) 61'; Hayasaka (yellow card) 85'	Stadium: Noevir Stadium Kobe; Attendance: 18,725; Referee: Hajime Matsuo

18 July 2018 16	V-Varen Nagasaki	0 – 1	Vissel Kobe	Isahaya
19:00 JST (UTC+9)	Tagami (yellow card) 22'	Report	Wellington (yellow card) 26' (goal) 39'; Mita (yellow card) 34'; Bunmathan (yellow card) 85'	Stadium: Transcosmos Stadium Nagasaki; Attendance: 9,366; Referee: Nobutsugu Murakami

22 July 2018 17	Vissel Kobe	0 – 3	Shonan Bellmare	Kobe
18:00 JST (UTC+9)		Report	Saka 10'; Yamasaki (yellow card) 32'; Saito 48'; Kikuchi 67'	Stadium: Noevir Stadium Kobe; Attendance: 26,146; Referee: Ryuji Sato

28 July 2018 18	Vissel Kobe	1 – 0	Kashiwa Reysol	Kobe
19:00 JST (UTC+9)	Masuyama 66'	Report	Yamazaki (yellow card) 88'	Stadium: Noevir Stadium Kobe; Attendance: 22,879; Referee: Masuya Ueda

1 August 2018 19	Cerezo Osaka	1 – 1	Vissel Kobe	Osaka
19:00 JST (UTC+9)	Souza (yellow card) 38'; Kakitani (yellow card) 39'; K.Watanabe 40' (o.g.)	Report	Mihara (yellow card) 67'; Osaki (yellow card) 71'; Jonjić 74' (o.g.)	Stadium: Kincho Stadium; Attendance: 14,241; Referee: Yuichi Nishimura

5 August 2018 20	FC Tokyo	1 – 0	Vissel Kobe	Chōfu
19:00 JST (UTC+9)	Lins 90'	Report		Stadium: Ajinomoto Stadium; Attendance: 44,801; Referee: Itaru Hirose

11 August 2018 21	Vissel Kobe	2 – 1	Júbilo Iwata	Kobe
19:00 JST (UTC+9)	Iniesta 15'; Furuhashi (yellow card) 25' (goal) 56'; Fujita (yellow card) 90+2'; Kim (yellow card) 90+3'	Report	Takahashi (yellow card) 59'; Matsuura (yellow card) 77'; Kawamata 84' (pen.)	Stadium: Noevir Stadium Kobe; Attendance: 24,731; Referee: Yoshiro Imamura

15 August 2018 22	Vissel Kobe	1 – 1	Sanfrecce Hiroshima	Kobe
19:00 JST (UTC+9)	Iniesta 17'; Fujita (yellow card) 31'; Goke (yellow card) 50'; Wellington (yellow card) 55'	Report	Patric 15'; Nogami (yellow card) 89'	Stadium: Noevir Stadium Kobe; Attendance: 25,499; Referee: Yosuke Kubota

19 August 2018 23	Shonan Bellmare	0 – 2	Vissel Kobe	Hiratsuka
19:00 JST (UTC+9)	Takayama (yellow card) 73'	Report	Osaki (yellow card) 28'; Mita 37'; Goke 76'	Stadium: Shonan BMW Stadium Hiratsuka; Attendance: 15,351; Referee: Yusuke Araki

26 August 2018 24	Vissel Kobe	0 – 2	Yokohama F. Marinos	Kobe
18:00 JST (UTC+9)		Report	Kurihara (yellow card) 54'; Kubo 56'; Ogihara (yellow card) 81'; Nakagawa 85'	Stadium: Noevir Stadium Kobe; Attendance: 25,541; Referee: Yudai Yamamoto

1 September 2018 25	Hokkaido Consadole Sapporo	–	Vissel Kobe	Sapporo
14:00 JST (UTC+9)				Stadium: Sapporo Dome

=== J. League Cup ===
==== Group stage ====
7 March 2018 1	Vissel Kobe	2 – 2	V-Varen Nagasaki	Kobe
19:00 JST (UTC+9)	Podolski 51', 62'; Wellington (yellow card) 70'	Report	Choi 3'; Nagura 44'; Maeda (yellow card) 80'	Stadium: Noevir Stadium Kobe; Attendance: 4,881; Referee: Koei Koya

14 March 2018 2	Sagan Tosu	0 – 2	Vissel Kobe	Tosu
20:00 JST (UTC+9)	Kim (yellow card) 57'; Takahashi (yellow card) 90+3'; Anzai (yellow card) 90+4'	Report	K.Watanabe 4'; Kitamoto (yellow card) 41'; Otsuki 90'	Stadium: Best Amenity Stadium; Attendance: 5,118; Referee: Hajime Matsuo

4 April 2018 3	Shonan Bellmare	0 – 3	Vissel Kobe	Hiratsuka
19:00 JST (UTC+9)	Sugioka (yellow card) 66' (yellow-red card) 85'	Report	Nasu (yellow card) 6'; Bunmathan (yellow card) 8'; Matsushita (yellow card) 12'; Sasaki 23'; Wellington 30'; Yasui (yellow card) 62'; Maekawa (yellow card) 78'; K.Watanabe 86' (pen.)	Stadium: Shonan BMW Stadium Hiratsuka; Attendance: 5,802; Referee: Takuto Okabe

18 April 2018 4	V-Varen Nagasaki	1 – 2	Vissel Kobe	Isahaya
19:00 JST (UTC+9)	Juanma 22'; Usui (yellow card) 61'; Maeda (yellow card) 81'; T.Shikayama (yellow card) 90+5'	Report	Wellington 67'; Miya (yellow card) 71'; Goke 90+5'	Stadium: Transcosmos Stadium Nagasaki; Attendance: 3,488; Referee: Koichiro Fukushima

9 May 2018 5	Vissel Kobe	3 – 4	Shonan Bellmare	Kobe
19:00 JST (UTC+9)	Saito 29' (o.g.); Leandro 72'; Masuyama 90+2'	Report	André Bahia 33'; Omotehara 35'; Okazaki (yellow card) 45+1'; Noda 56'; Umesaki 73'	Stadium: Noevir Stadium Kobe; Attendance: 4,001; Referee: Yosuke Kubota

16 May 2018 6	Vissel Kobe	1 – 1	Sagan Tosu	Kobe
19:00 JST (UTC+9)	Havenaar 90+4'	Report	Ishikawa (yellow card) 39'; Kawano (yellow card) 50'; Anzai (yellow card) 52' (goal) 67'	Stadium: Noevir Stadium Kobe; Attendance: 4,017; Referee: Yusuke Araki

==== Knockout stage ====
2 June 2018 Quarterfinal 1st leg	Yokohama F. Marinos	4 – 2	Vissel Kobe	Yokohama
14:00 JST (UTC+9)	Ōtsu 23'; Nakagawa 30'; Boumal (yellow card) 45+1'; Amano 70'; Vieira 76'	Report	Wellington 8'; Watanabe 55'; Mita (yellow card) 88'	Stadium: NHK Spring Mitsuzawa Football Stadium; Attendance: 8,827; Referee: Ryuji Sato

9 June 2018 Quarterfinal 2nd leg	Vissel Kobe	1 – 1 (3 – 5 agg.)	Yokohama F. Marinos	Kobe
14:00 JST (UTC+9)	Fujita 14' (yellow card) 86'; Bunmathan (yellow card) 45'; Tanaka (yellow card) 61'; Takahashi (yellow card) 64'	Report	Kanai (yellow card) 31'; Nakagawa (yellow card) 45'; Vieira 66'	Stadium: Noevir Stadium Kobe; Attendance: 6,895; Referee: Yudai Yamamoto

=== Emperor's Cup ===
6 June 2018 Second Round	Vissel Kobe	3 – 0	Fukuoka University	Kobe
19:00 JST (UTC+9)	Mita 25'; Mihara (yellow card) 51' (goal) 54'; Wellington 73'	Report	T.Umeki (yellow card) 31'	Stadium: Noevir Stadium Kobe; Attendance: 2,202

11 July 2018 Third Round	Vissel Kobe	6 – 1	JEF United Chiba	Kobe
19:00 JST (UTC+9)	Yasui 31'; Wellington 36', 90+1'; Mita 39', 56'; Otsuki 74'	Report	Masushima (yellow card) 52'; Ibusuki 75'	Stadium: Noevir Stadium Kobe; Referee: 3,540

22 August 2018 Fourth Round	Sagan Tosu	3 – 0	Vissel Kobe	Tosu
19:00 JST (UTC+9)	Watanabe 37' (o.g.); Anzai 50'; Torres 84'	Report	Podolski (yellow card) 23'; Bunmathan (yellow card) 90+3'	Stadium: Best Amenity Stadium; Attendance: 17,361

== Squad statistics ==
As of match played 26 August 2018

=== Appearances and goals ===
No.	Pos	Nat	Player	Total		J-League		J-League Cup		Emperor's Cup	
No.	Pos	Nat	Player	Apps	Goals	Apps	Goals	Apps	Goals	Apps	Goals
1	GK	(Japan) JPN	Daiki Maekawa	8	0	0	0	7	0	1	0
2	DF	(Japan) JPN	Daisuke Nasu	12	0	2+4	0	4+1	0	1	0
3	DF	(Japan) JPN	Hirofumi Watanabe	27	0	22	0	2	0	3	0
4	DF	(Japan) JPN	Kunie Kitamoto	7	0	1	0	5+1	0	0	0
5	DF	(Qatar) QAT	Ahmed Yasser	3	0	2	0	0	0	0+1	0
6	DF	(Japan) JPN	Shunki Takahashi	15	0	8+1	0	3+1	0	2	0
7	MF	(Japan) JPN	Hirotaka Mita	27	7	20+2	4	2	0	3	3
8	MF	(Spain) ESP	Andrés Iniesta	7	2	5+1	2	0	0	0+1	0
10	FW	(Germany) GER	Lukas Podolski	17	5	15	3	1	2	1	0
14	MF	(Japan) JPN	Naoyuki Fujita	26	2	18+2	1	4	1	2	0
15	DF	(Japan) JPN	Daiki Miya	9	0	3	0	4	0	2	0
16	FW	(Japan) JPN	Kyogo Furuhashi	4	1	3+1	1	0	0	0	0
17	FW	(Brazil) BRA	Wellington	28	11	10+9	5	5+1	3	3	3
18	GK	(South Korea) KOR	Kim Seung-gyu	26	0	24	0	0	0	2	0
20	MF	(Japan) JPN	Asahi Masuyama	12	2	5+2	1	2+3	1	0	0
21	FW	(Japan) JPN	Junya Tanaka	21	2	10+7	2	2	0	0+2	0
22	DF	(Japan) JPN	Wataru Hashimoto	13	0	8+2	0	2+1	0	0	0
23	MF	(Japan) JPN	Yoshiki Matsushita	12	0	2+5	0	4	0	1	0
24	MF	(Japan) JPN	Masatoshi Mihara	23	2	12+4	1	4+1	0	1+1	1
25	DF	(Japan) JPN	Leo Osaki	8	0	7	0	0	0	1	0
27	MF	(Japan) JPN	Yuta Goke	25	2	13+4	1	5+1	1	1+1	0
30	DF	(Thailand) THA	Theerathon Bunmathan	27	0	16+4	0	4	0	3	0
33	FW	(Japan) JPN	Shuhei Otsuki	22	3	13+3	1	1+2	1	2+1	1
34	DF	(Japan) JPN	So Fujitani	10	0	4+2	0	3+1	0	0	0
35	MF	(Japan) JPN	Takuya Yasui	10	1	2+2	0	4	0	2	1
39	DF	(Japan) JPN	Masahiko Inoha	4	0	3+1	0	0	0	0	0
40	DF	(Japan) JPN	Yuki Kobayashi	4	0	2	0	1+1	0	0	0
50	FW	(Japan) JPN	Shun Nagasawa	2	0	1+1	0	0	0	0	0
Players away on loan:
9	FW	(Japan) JPN	Mike Havenaar	9	2	3+1	1	2+3	1	0	0
13	FW	(Japan) JPN	Keijiro Ogawa	12	0	2+3	0	5+2	0	0	0
28	GK	(Japan) JPN	Kenshin Yoshimaru	1	0	0	0	1	0	0	0
31	MF	(Japan) JPN	Yuya Nakasaka	6	0	0	0	3+1	0	0+2	0
36	MF	(Japan) JPN	Tatsuki Noda	1	0	0	0	1	0	0	0
38	FW	(Japan) JPN	Daiju Sasaki	10	2	6	1	2+2	1	0	0
Players who left Vissel Kobe during the season:
5	MF	(South Korea) KOR	Jung Woo-young	12	2	12	2	0	0	0	0
11	FW	(Brazil) BRA	Leandro	3	1	0+2	0	1	1	0	0
19	FW	(Japan) JPN	Kazuma Watanabe	26	7	10+9	4	4+1	3	2	0

=== Goalscorers ===
Place	Position	Nation	Number	Name	J-League	J-League Cup	Emperor's Cup	Total
1	FW	(Brazil)	17	Wellington	5	3	3	11
2	FW	(Japan)	19	Kazuma Watanabe	4	3	0	7
2	MF	(Japan)	8	Hirotaka Mita	4	0	3	7
4	FW	(Germany)	10	Lukas Podolski	3	2	0	5
5	FW	(Japan)	33	Shuhei Otsuki	1	1	1	3
6	FW	(Japan)	21	Junya Tanaka	2	0	0	2
6	MF	(South Korea)	5	Jung Woo-young	2	0	0	2
6	MF	(Spain)	8	Andrés Iniesta	2	0	0	2
6	FW	(Japan)	38	Daiju Sasaki	1	1	0	2
6	FW	(Japan)	9	Mike Havenaar	1	1	0	2
6	MF	(Japan)	14	Naoyuki Fujita	1	1	0	2
6	MF	(Japan)	20	Asahi Masuyama	1	1	0	2
6	MF	(Japan)	27	Yuta Goke	1	1	0	2
6	MF	(Japan)	24	Masatoshi Mihara	1	0	1	2
6				Own goal	1	1	0	2
14	FW	(Japan)	16	Kyogo Furuhashi	1	0	0	1
14	FW	(Brazil)	11	Leandro	0	1	0	1
14	MF	(Japan)	35	Takuya Yasui	0	0	1	1
				TOTALS	31	16	9	56

=== Disciplinary record ===
Number	Nation	Position	Name	J-League		J. League Cup		Emperor's Cup		Total	
Number	Nation	Position	Name	Booked	Sent off (straight red)	Booked	Sent off (straight red)	Booked	Sent off (straight red)	Booked	Sent off (straight red)
1	(Japan)	GK	Daiki Maekawa	0	0	1	0	0	0	1	0
2	(Japan)	DF	Daisuke Nasu	1	0	1	0	0	0	2	0
3	(Japan)	DF	Hirofumi Watanabe	3	0	0	0	0	0	3	0
4	(Japan)	DF	Kunie Kitamoto	0	0	1	0	0	0	1	0
6	(Japan)	DF	Shunki Takahashi	0	0	1	0	0	0	1	0
7	(Japan)	MF	Hirotaka Mita	4	0	1	0	0	0	5	0
10	(Germany)	FW	Lukas Podolski	5	0	0	0	1	0	6	0
14	(Japan)	MF	Naoyuki Fujita	4	0	1	0	0	0	5	0
15	(Japan)	DF	Daiki Miya	0	0	1	0	0	0	1	0
16	(Japan)	FW	Kyogo Furuhashi	1	0	0	0	0	0	1	0
17	(Brazil)	FW	Wellington	4	0	1	0	0	0	5	0
18	(South Korea)	GK	Kim Seung-gyu	1	0	0	0	0	0	1	0
21	(Japan)	FW	Junya Tanaka	1	0	1	0	0	0	2	0
22	(Japan)	DF	Wataru Hashimoto	2	0	0	0	0	0	2	0
23	(Japan)	MF	Yoshiki Matsushita	1	0	1	0	0	0	2	0
24	(Japan)	MF	Masatoshi Mihara	3	0	0	0	1	0	4	0
25	(Japan)	DF	Leo Osaki	2	0	0	0	0	0	2	0
27	(Japan)	MF	Yuta Goke	1	0	0	0	0	0	1	0
30	(Thailand)	DF	Theerathon Bunmathan	2	0	2	0	1	0	5	0
35	(Japan)	MF	Takuya Yasui	1	0	1	0	0	0	2	0
Players away on loan:
9	(Japan)	FW	Mike Havenaar	1	0	0	0	0	0	1	0
Players who left Vissel Kobe during the season:
5	(South Korea)	MF	Jung Woo-young	4	1	0	0	0	0	4	1
			TOTALS	41	1	13	0	3	0	57	1
