= 2017 Vissel Kobe season =

Vissel Kobe
2017 season
- Manager: Nelsinho; Takayuki Yoshida
- Ground: Noevir Stadium Kobe
- J1 League: 9th
- Emperor's Cup: Semi-finals
- J.League Cup: Quarter-finals
- Highest home attendance: 25,278 (vs. Albirex Niigata, 4 March, J1 League)
- Lowest home attendance: 1,805 (vs. Kataller Toyama, 21 June, Emperor's Cup)
Home colours	Away colours

The 2017 Vissel Kobe season was Vissel Kobe's fourth consecutive season in the J1 League and their 19th J1 League season overall. They also took part in the 2017 Emperor's Cup and the 2017 J.League Cup.

== Squad ==
As of 8 February 2017. Note: Flags indicate national team as defined under FIFA eligibility rules; some limited exceptions apply. Players may hold more than one non-FIFA nationality.

No.	Pos.	Nation	Player
1	GK	JPN	Daiya Maekawa
3	DF	JPN	Hirofumi Watanabe
4	DF	JPN	Kunie Kitamoto
5	DF	JPN	Takuya Iwanami
6	DF	JPN	Shunki Takahashi
7	MF	BRA	Nílton
8	MF	BRA	Wescley
11	FW	BRA	Leandro
13	FW	JPN	Keijiro Ogawa
14	MF	JPN	Naoyuki Fujita
15	MF	JPN	Seigo Kobayashi
16	MF	JPN	Hideto Takahashi
17	FW	JPN	Hideo Tanaka
18	GK	KOR	Kim Seung-gyu
19	FW	JPN	Kazuma Watanabe
21	FW	JPN	Junya Tanaka

No.	Pos.	Nation	Player
22	DF	JPN	Wataru Hashimoto
23	MF	JPN	Yoshiki Matsushita
24	MF	JPN	Masatoshi Mihara
25	DF	JPN	Junya Higashi
26	DF	JPN	Shinji Yamaguchi
28	GK	JPN	Kenshin Yoshimaru
29	MF	JPN	Kotaro Omori
30	GK	JPN	Kenta Tokushige
31	MF	JPN	Yuya Nakasaka
33	FW	JPN	Shuhei Otsuki
34	DF	JPN	So Fujitani
35	MF	JPN	Takuya Yasui
36	MF	JPN	Tatsuki Noda
37	FW	JPN	Akito Mukai
39	DF	JPN	Masahiko Inoha
—	FW	GER	Lukas Podolski

=== Out on loan ===
Note: Flags indicate national team as defined under FIFA eligibility rules; some limited exceptions apply. Players may hold more than one non-FIFA nationality.

No.	Pos.	Nation	Player
—	MF	JPN	Ryosuke Maeda (at Oita Trinita)
—	MF	JPN	Asahi Masuyama (at Yokohama FC)

No.	Pos.	Nation	Player
—	FW	JPN	Ryo Matsumura (at Tokushima Vortis)

== Competitions ==
=== J. League ===
==== Tables ====
Pos	Team	Pld	W	D	L	GF	GA	GD	Pts
7	Urawa Red Diamonds	34	14	7	13	64	54	+10	49
8	Sagan Tosu	34	13	8	13	41	44	−3	47
9	Vissel Kobe	34	13	5	16	40	45	−5	44
10	Gamba Osaka	34	11	10	13	48	41	+7	43
11	Consadole Sapporo	34	12	7	15	39	47	−8	43

Source: Meiji Yasuda J1 League
Rules for classification: 1) Points; 2) Goal difference; 3) Goals scored

==== Results ====
Match	Date	Team	Score	Team	Venue	Attendance
1	2017.02.25	Shimizu S-Pulse	0-1	Vissel Kobe	IAI Stadium Nihondaira	17,861
2	2017.03.04	Vissel Kobe	2-1	Albirex Niigata	Noevir Stadium Kobe	25,278
3	2017.03.11	Vegalta Sendai	0-2	Vissel Kobe	Yurtec Stadium Sendai	14,369
4	2017.03.18	Vissel Kobe	1-0	Júbilo Iwata	Noevir Stadium Kobe	17,027
5	2017.04.01	Vissel Kobe	1-3	Urawa Reds	Noevir Stadium Kobe	18,889
6	2017.04.08	Omiya Ardija	0-2	Vissel Kobe	NACK5 Stadium Omiya	9,598
7	2017.04.16	Vissel Kobe	1-2	Kashiwa Reysol	Noevir Stadium Kobe	14,377
8	2017.04.22	Sagan Tosu	1-0	Vissel Kobe	Best Amenity Stadium	11,088
9	2017.04.30	Vissel Kobe	0-1	Ventforet Kofu	Noevir Stadium Kobe	14,662
10	2017.05.06	Sanfrecce Hiroshima	1-1	Vissel Kobe	Edion Stadium Hiroshima	13,421
11	2017.05.14	Kashima Antlers	1-2	Vissel Kobe	Kashima Soccer Stadium	18,626
12	2017.05.20	Vissel Kobe	1-1	FC Tokyo	Noevir Stadium Kobe	24,814
13	2017.05.28	Vissel Kobe	1-2	Cerezo Osaka	Noevir Stadium Kobe	20,391
14	2017.06.04	Hokkaido Consadole Sapporo	1-2	Vissel Kobe	Sapporo Dome	12,644
15	2017.06.17	Vissel Kobe	0-1	Gamba Osaka	Noevir Stadium Kobe	24,522
16	2017.06.25	Yokohama F. Marinos	2-0	Vissel Kobe	Nissan Stadium	16,673
17	2017.07.01	Kawasaki Frontale	5-0	Vissel Kobe	Kawasaki Todoroki Stadium	19,991
18	2017.07.08	Vissel Kobe	3-0	Vegalta Sendai	Noevir Stadium Kobe	19,207
19	2017.07.29	Vissel Kobe	3-1	Omiya Ardija	Noevir Stadium Kobe	19,415
20	2017.08.05	Kashiwa Reysol	3-1	Vissel Kobe	Hitachi Kashiwa Stadium	13,284
21	2017.08.09	Vissel Kobe	1-2	Kashima Antlers	Noevir Stadium Kobe	19,039
22	2017.08.13	FC Tokyo	1-0	Vissel Kobe	Ajinomoto Stadium	30,642
23	2017.08.20	Vissel Kobe	0-0	Yokohama F. Marinos	Noevir Stadium Kobe	19,987
24	2017.08.26	Júbilo Iwata	2-1	Vissel Kobe	Yamaha Stadium	14,539
25	2017.09.09	Gamba Osaka	1-2	Vissel Kobe	Suita City Football Stadium	31,775
26	2017.09.16	Vissel Kobe	2-0	Hokkaido Consadole Sapporo	Kobe Universiade Memorial Stadium	7,911
27	2017.09.23	Vissel Kobe	0-0	Kawasaki Frontale	Noevir Stadium Kobe	18,111
28	2017.09.30	Albirex Niigata	0-2	Vissel Kobe	Denka Big Swan Stadium	21,709
29	2017.10.14	Urawa Reds	1-1	Vissel Kobe	Saitama Stadium 2002	29,931
30	2017.10.21	Vissel Kobe	1-2	Sagan Tosu	Noevir Stadium Kobe	17,016
31	2017.10.29	Ventforet Kofu	2-3	Vissel Kobe	Yamanashi Chuo Bank Stadium	4,692
32	2017.11.18	Vissel Kobe	1-2	Sanfrecce Hiroshima	Kobe Universiade Memorial Stadium	12,805
33	2017.11.26	Cerezo Osaka	3-1	Vissel Kobe	Yanmar Stadium Nagai	29,918
34	2017.12.02	Vissel Kobe	1-3	Shimizu S-Pulse	Kobe Universiade Memorial Stadium	17,174

=== Emperor's Cup ===
21 June 2017 Second Round	Vissel Kobe	3–1	Kataller Toyama	Kobe
19:00		Report		Stadium: Kobe Universiade Memorial Stadium; Attendance: 1,805; Referee: Yuichi Nishimura

12 July 2017 Third Round	Vissel Kobe	3–1	Zweigen Kanazawa	Kanazawa
19:00		Report		Stadium: Ishikawa Athletics Stadium

20 September 2017 Fourth Round	Matsumoto Yamaga FC	0–2	Vissel Kobe	Matsumoto
19:00		Report	Hashimoto 23'; Watanabe 81'	Stadium: Matsumotodaira Football Stadium; Attendance: 6,721; Referee: Y. Nishimura

25 October 2017 Quarter-finals	Vissel Kobe	1–1 (a.e.t.) (5 – 4 p)	Kashima Antlers	Kobe
19:00	Havenaar 90+4'	Report	Shoji 63'	Stadium: Kobe Universiade Memorial Stadium; Attendance: 5,186; Referee: H. Kimura
	Penalties
	Havenaar (penalty scored); Nílton (penalty scored); Watanabe (penalty scored); Fujita (penalty scored); Iwanami (penalty scored)		(penalty scored) Ogasawara; (penalty scored) Nishi; (penalty missed) Nakamura; (penalty scored) Misao; (penalty scored) Shoji

23 December 2017 Semi-finals	Vissel Kobe	1–3 (a.e.t.)	Cerezo Osaka	Osaka
13:00	Omori 90'	Report	Mizunuma 90+1'; Kakitani 98'; Souza 114'	Stadium: Nagai Stadium; Attendance: 24,833; Referee: Y. Yamamoto

=== J.League Cup ===
==== Group stage ====
Team	Pld	W	D	L	GF	GA	GD	Pts
Vissel Kobe	6	5	0	1	10	3	+7	15
Cerezo Osaka	6	4	2	0	9	4	+5	14
Sanfrecce Hiroshima	6	3	1	2	5	6	−1	10
Yokohama F. Marinos	6	3	0	3	8	8	0	9
Ventforet Kofu	6	1	2	3	5	6	−1	5
Sagan Tosu	6	1	2	3	10	12	−2	5
Albirex Niigata	6	0	1	5	3	11	−8	1

==== Quarter-finals ====
30 August 2017 First leg	Vissel Kobe	0–0	Gamba Osaka	Kobe, Japan
				Stadium: Noevir Stadium Kobe; Attendance: 7,577

3 September 2017 Second leg	Gamba Osaka	2–0 (2–0 agg.)	Vissel Kobe	Suita, Japan
				Stadium: Panasonic Stadium Suita; Attendance: 12,310
