= 2016 Vissel Kobe season =

2016 season of Vissel Kobe

Vissel Kobe
2016 season
- Manager: Nelsinho Baptista
- Stadium: Noevir Stadium Kobe
- J1 League: 7th
Home colours	Away colours

2016 Vissel Kobe season.

== Squad ==
As of 13 February 2016. Note: Flags indicate national team as defined under FIFA eligibility rules; some limited exceptions apply. Players may hold more than one non-FIFA nationality.

No.	Pos.	Nation	Player
2	DF	JPN	Yudai Tanaka
3	DF	JPN	Takahito Soma
4	DF	JPN	Kunie Kitamoto
5	DF	JPN	Takuya Iwanami
6	DF	JPN	Shunki Takahashi
7	FW	BRA	Pedro Junior
8	DF	JPN	Shohei Takahashi
9	FW	JPN	Daisuke Ishizu (on loan from Avispa Fukuoka)
10	MF	BRA	Nílton
11	FW	BRA	Leandro
13	FW	JPN	Keijiro Ogawa
14	MF	JPN	Naoyuki Fujita
15	MF	JPN	Seigo Kobayashi
17	FW	JPN	Hideo Tanaka
18	GK	KOR	Kim Seung-gyu
19	FW	JPN	Kazuma Watanabe

No.	Pos.	Nation	Player
20	MF	JPN	Asahi Masuyama
21	GK	JPN	Koki Matsuzawa
22	GK	JPN	Kaito Yamamoto
23	MF	JPN	Yoshiki Matsushita
24	MF	JPN	Masatoshi Mihara
25	DF	JPN	Junya Higashi
26	DF	JPN	Shinji Yamaguchi
27	MF	JPN	Ryo Matsumura
29	FW	JPN	Yosuke Tashiro
30	GK	JPN	Kenta Tokushige
31	MF	JPN	Yuya Nakasaka
32	MF	JPN	Ryosuke Maeda
33	DF	JPN	Taisuke Muramatsu
34	DF	JPN	So Fujitani
39	DF	JPN	Masahiko Inoha

=== Out on loan ===
Note: Flags indicate national team as defined under FIFA eligibility rules; some limited exceptions apply. Players may hold more than one non-FIFA nationality.

No.	Pos.	Nation	Player
—	DF	KOR	Gang Yoon-goo (at Ehime FC)
—	MF	JPN	Tomoki Wada (at Incheon United FC)

No.	Pos.	Nation	Player
—	FW	JPN	Ryo Matsumura (at Tochigi SC)

== J1 League ==
=== League table ===
Pos	Team	Pld	W	D	L	GF	GA	GD	Pts
5	Omiya Ardija	34	15	11	8	41	36	+5	56
6	Sanfrecce Hiroshima	34	16	7	11	58	40	+18	55
7	Vissel Kobe	34	16	7	11	56	43	+13	55
8	Kashiwa Reysol	34	15	9	10	52	44	+8	54
9	FC Tokyo	34	15	7	12	39	39	0	52

Source: Meiji Yasuda J1 League
Rules for classification: 1) Points; 2) Goal difference; 3) Goals scored.

=== Match details ===
J1 League match details
Match	Date	Team	Score	Team	Venue	Attendance
1–1	2016.02.27	Vissel Kobe	0–2	Ventforet Kofu	Noevir Stadium Kobe	23,862
1–2	2016.03.05	Vissel Kobe	6–3	Albirex Niigata	Noevir Stadium Kobe	12,487
1–3	2016.03.11	FC Tokyo	1–0	Vissel Kobe	Ajinomoto Stadium	11,488
1–4	2016.03.19	Vissel Kobe	2–1	Gamba Osaka	Noevir Stadium Kobe	16,026
1–5	2016.04.02	Shonan Bellmare	1–2	Vissel Kobe	Shonan BMW Stadium Hiratsuka	8,052
1–6	2016.04.10	Vissel Kobe	0–0	Avispa Fukuoka	Noevir Stadium Kobe	21,254
1–8	2016.04.24	Vissel Kobe	2–2	Vegalta Sendai	Noevir Stadium Kobe	12,678
1–9	2016.04.30	Kashiwa Reysol	2–0	Vissel Kobe	Hitachi Kashiwa Stadium	11,382
1–10	2016.05.04	Vissel Kobe	4–1	Júbilo Iwata	Noevir Stadium Kobe	17,038
1–11	2016.05.08	Nagoya Grampus	0–1	Vissel Kobe	Toyota Stadium	15,000
1–12	2016.05.14	Kawasaki Frontale	3–1	Vissel Kobe	Kawasaki Todoroki Stadium	20,215
1–13	2016.05.21	Vissel Kobe	0–1	Yokohama F. Marinos	Noevir Stadium Kobe	15,895
1–14	2016.05.29	Omiya Ardija	2–2	Vissel Kobe	NACK5 Stadium Omiya	12,446
1–7	2016.06.02	Sagan Tosu	0–0	Vissel Kobe	Best Amenity Stadium	6,499
1–15	2016.06.11	Vissel Kobe	1–1	Sanfrecce Hiroshima	Noevir Stadium Kobe	14,509
1–16	2016.06.18	Vissel Kobe	1–2	Kashima Antlers	Noevir Stadium Kobe	18,875
1–17	2016.06.25	Urawa Reds	3–1	Vissel Kobe	Saitama Stadium 2002	29,462
2–1	2016.07.02	Ventforet Kofu	0–3	Vissel Kobe	Yamanashi Chuo Bank Stadium	7,011
2–2	2016.07.09	Vissel Kobe	2–2	Sagan Tosu	Noevir Stadium Kobe	13,008
2–3	2016.07.13	Yokohama F. Marinos	3–2	Vissel Kobe	NHK Spring Mitsuzawa Football Stadium	7,033
2–4	2016.07.17	Vissel Kobe	2–0	Shonan Bellmare	Noevir Stadium Kobe	13,076
2–5	2016.07.23	Sanfrecce Hiroshima	2–0	Vissel Kobe	Edion Stadium Hiroshima	12,310
2–6	2016.07.30	Vissel Kobe	1–0	Omiya Ardija	Noevir Stadium Kobe	11,212
2–7	2016.08.06	Albirex Niigata	1–0	Vissel Kobe	Denka Big Swan Stadium	18,467
2–8	2016.08.13	Vissel Kobe	4–1	FC Tokyo	Noevir Stadium Kobe	13,419
2–9	2016.08.20	Gamba Osaka	0–1	Vissel Kobe	Suita City Football Stadium	26,520
2–10	2016.08.27	Vissel Kobe	2–1	Urawa Reds	Noevir Stadium Kobe	14,877
2–11	2016.09.10	Júbilo Iwata	3–4	Vissel Kobe	Yamaha Stadium	12,314
2–12	2016.09.17	Vissel Kobe	1–1	Kashiwa Reysol	Kobe Universiade Memorial Stadium	22,059
2–13	2016.09.25	Avispa Fukuoka	1–4	Vissel Kobe	Level5 Stadium	11,155
2–14	2016.10.01	Vissel Kobe	3–0	Kawasaki Frontale	Noevir Stadium Kobe	25,722
2–15	2016.10.22	Vegalta Sendai	3–0	Vissel Kobe	Yurtec Stadium Sendai	15,638
2–16	2016.10.29	Vissel Kobe	3–0	Nagoya Grampus	Noevir Stadium Kobe	23,313
2–17	2016.11.03	Kashima Antlers	0–1	Vissel Kobe	Kashima Soccer Stadium	15,925
