= 2019 Vissel Kobe season =

Vissel Kobe
2019 season
- Chairman: Katsuhiro Shimizu
- Manager: Juan Manuel Lillo (until 28 April); Takayuki Yoshida (until 8 June); Thorsten Fink
- Ground: Noevir Stadium Kobe; Kobe, Japan (Capacity: 30,134)
- J1 League: 8th
- Emperor's Cup: Winners
- J. League Cup: Group stage
- Top goalscorer: League: David Villa (13); All: David Villa (13)
- Highest home attendance: 25,929 (vs. Kawasaki Frontale, 28 April 2019, J1 League)
- Lowest home attendance: 3,222 (vs. Kitakyushu, 3 June 2019, J.League Cup)
- Average home league attendance: 21,491
Home colours	Away colours	Third colours

The 2019 Vissel Kobe season was Vissel Kobe's sixth consecutive season in the J1 League following promotion to the top flight in 2013 and their 21st J1 League season overall. The club also participated in the 2019 Emperor's Cup, the 2019 J.League Cup. Vissel Kobe defeated Kashima Antlers in the final of the Emperor's Cup on 1 January 2020, winning a major trophy for the first time in the club's history.

== Squad ==
As of 20 August 2019

Note: Flags indicate national team as defined under FIFA eligibility rules; some limited exceptions apply. Players may hold more than one non-FIFA nationality.

No.	Pos.	Nation	Player
1	GK	(Japan) JPN	Daiya Maekawa
2	DF	(Japan) JPN	Daisuke Nasu
3	DF	(Japan) JPN	Hirofumi Watanabe
4	DF	(Belgium) BEL	Thomas Vermaelen
5	MF	(Japan) JPN	Hotaru Yamaguchi
6	MF	(Spain) ESP	Sergi Samper
7	FW	(Spain) ESP	David Villa
8	MF	(Spain) ESP	Andrés Iniesta (Captain)
9	FW	(Japan) JPN	Noriaki Fujimoto
10	FW	(Germany) GER	Lukas Podolski
13	FW	(Japan) JPN	Keijiro Ogawa
16	FW	(Japan) JPN	Kyogo Furuhashi
17	FW	(Brazil) BRA	Wellington
18	GK	(Japan) JPN	Hiroki Iikura
19	DF	(Japan) JPN	Ryo Hatsuse
20	MF	(Japan) JPN	Asahi Masuyama
21	FW	(Japan) JPN	Junya Tanaka

No.	Pos.	Nation	Player
22	DF	(Japan) JPN	Daigo Nishi
24	DF	(Japan) JPN	Gōtoku Sakai
25	DF	(Japan) JPN	Leo Osaki
27	MF	(Japan) JPN	Yuta Goke
28	GK	(Japan) JPN	Kenshin Yoshimaru
29	GK	(Japan) JPN	Kota Ogi
30	GK	(Japan) JPN	Genta Ito
31	MF	(Japan) JPN	Yuya Nakasaka
32	DF	(Japan) JPN	Wataru Hashimoto
33	DF	(Brazil) BRA	Dankler
34	DF	(Japan) JPN	So Fujitani
35	MF	(Japan) JPN	Takuya Yasui
38	MF	(Japan) JPN	Daiju Sasaki
39	DF	(Japan) JPN	Tetsushi Yamakawa (designated special player)
41	FW	(Japan) JPN	Yutaro Oda (Type 2 Player)
42	MF	(Japan) JPN	Kakeru Yamauchi (Type 2 Player)
44	DF	(Lebanon) LBN	Joan Oumari

=== Out on loan ===
Note: Flags indicate national team as defined under FIFA eligibility rules; some limited exceptions apply. Players may hold more than one non-FIFA nationality.

No.	Pos.	Nation	Player
—	DF	(Japan) JPN	Yuki Kobayashi (at FC Machida Zelvia)
—	DF	(Japan) JPN	Daiki Miya (at Mito Hollyhock)
—	MF	(Japan) JPN	Masatoshi Mihara (at Kashiwa Reysol)

No.	Pos.	Nation	Player
—	MF	(Japan) JPN	Tatsuki Noda (at Kataller Toyama)
—	FW	(Japan) JPN	Mike Havenaar (at (Thailand) Bangkok United)
—	FW	(Japan) JPN	Akito Mukai (at FC Imabari)

== Competitions ==
=== J. League ===
==== Tables ====
Pos	Team	Pld	W	D	L	GF	GA	GD	Pts	Qualification or relegation
6	Sanfrecce Hiroshima	34	15	10	9	45	29	+16	55	
7	Gamba Osaka	34	12	11	11	54	48	+6	47	
8	Vissel Kobe	34	14	5	15	61	59	+2	47	Qualification for the Champions League group stage (Note: Vissel Kobe qualified for the 2020 AFC Champions League group stage as 2019 Emperor's Cup winners.)
9	Oita Trinita	34	12	11	11	35	35	0	47	
10	Hokkaido Consadole Sapporo	34	13	7	14	54	49	+5	46	

Source: Meiji Yasuda J1 League
Rules for classification: 1) Points; 2) Goal difference; 3) Goals scored.

==== Results summary ====
Overall								Home						Away					
Pld	W	D	L	GF	GA	GD	Pts	W	D	L	GF	GA	GD	W	D	L	GF	GA	GD
34	14	5	15	61	59	+2	47	8	3	6	34	26	+8	6	2	9	27	33	−6

Last updated: 7 December 2019.
Source: see below

==== Results by round ====
Round	1	2	3	4	5	6	7	8	9	10	11	12	13	14	15	16	17	18	19	20	21	22	23	24	25	26	27	28	29	30	31	32	33	34
Ground	A	H	A	H	A	A	H	A	H	A	H	A	H	A	A	H	H	A	A	H	H	A	H	A	H	H	A	A	H	H	A	H	A	H
Result	L	W	W	D	W	L	L	L	L	L	L	L	W	D	W	D	W	L	L	L	D	D	W	W	L	W	W	L	L	W	L	W	W	W
Position	16	9	5	6	4	7	10	11	12	13	13	15	13	13	11	13	11	13	15	15	15	15	15	12	12	9	9	9	10	10	10	10	10	8

Updated to match(es) played on 7 December 2019. Source: See Below
A = Away; H = Home; W = Win; D = Draw; L = Loss

=== Emperor's Cup ===
==== Knockout stage ====
3 July 2019 Second round	Vissel Kobe	4–0	Giravanz Kitakyushu	Noevir Stadium Kobe, Kobe
19:00		Report

14 August 2019 Third round	Vissel Kobe	4–0	Omiya Ardija	NACK5 Stadium, Saitama
19:00		Report

18 September 2019 Fourth round	Vissel Kobe	3–2	Kawasaki Frontale	Kobe Universiade Memorial Stadium, Kobe
19:00		Report

23 October 2019 Quarter-final	Vissel Kobe	1–0	Oita Trinita	Noevir Stadium Kobe, Kobe
19:00		Report		Referee: Yuichi Nishimura

21 December 2019 Semi-final	Vissel Kobe	3–1	Shimizu S-Pulse	Noevir Stadium Kobe, Kobe
14:05		Report		Attendance: 22,341; Referee: H. Kimura

===== Final =====
The final was played on 1 January 2020 at the newly-rebuilt National Stadium in Tokyo.

1 January 2020	Vissel Kobe	2–0	Kashima Antlers	National Stadium, Tokyo
14:35	Inukai 18' (o.g.); Fujimoto 38'	Report		Attendance: 57,597; Referee: Ryuji Sato

=== J.League Cup ===
Pos	Team	Pld	W	D	L	GF	GA	GD	Pts	CER	GRA	TRI	VIS
1	Cerezo Osaka	6	3	2	1	9	4	+5	11	—	3–0	2–0	1–0
2	Nagoya Grampus	6	2	3	1	11	11	0	9	2–2	—	2–1	2–2
3	Oita Trinita	6	2	1	3	7	10	−3	7	2–1	2–2	—	2–1
4	Vissel Kobe	6	1	2	3	6	8	−2	5	0–0	1–3	2–0	—

Source: League table, Match results
