= 2008 Vissel Kobe season =

Vissel Kobe
2008 season
- Manager: Hiroshi Matsuda
- Stadium: Home's Stadium Kobe
- J. League 1: 10th
- Emperor's Cup: 5th Round
- J. League Cup: GL-A 2nd
- Top goalscorer: Yoshito Ōkubo (11)

2008 Vissel Kobe season

== Competitions ==
Competitions	Position
J. League 1	10th / 18 clubs
Emperor's Cup	5th Round
J. League Cup	GL-A 2nd / 4 clubs

== Domestic results ==
=== J. League 1 ===
Match	Date	Venue	Opponents	Score
1	2008..			-
2	2008..			-
3	2008..			-
4	2008..			-
5	2008..			-
6	2008..			-
7	2008..			-
8	2008..			-
9	2008..			-
10	2008..			-
11	2008..			-
12	2008..			-
13	2008..			-
14	2008..			-
15	2008..			-
16	2008..			-
17	2008..			-
18	2008..			-
19	2008..			-
20	2008..			-
21	2008..			-
22	2008..			-
23	2008..			-
24	2008..			-
25	2008..			-
26	2008..			-
27	2008..			-
28	2008..			-
29	2008..			-
30	2008..			-
31	2008..			-
32	2008..			-
33	2008..			-
34	2008..			-

=== Emperor's Cup ===
Match	Date	Venue	Opponents	Score
4th Round	2008..			-
5th Round	2008..			-

=== J. League Cup ===
Match	Date	Venue	Opponents	Score
GL-A-1	2008..			-
GL-A-2	2008..			-
GL-A-3	2008..			-
GL-A-4	2008..			-
GL-A-5	2008..			-
GL-A-6	2008..			-

== Player statistics ==
No.	Pos.	Player	D.o.B. (Age)	Height / Weight	J. League 1		Emperor's Cup		J. League Cup		Total	
No.	Pos.	Player	D.o.B. (Age)	Height / Weight	Apps	Goals	Apps	Goals	Apps	Goals	Apps	Goals
1	GK	Tatsuya Enomoto	March 16, 1979 (aged 28)	cm / kg	25	0						
2	DF	Teruaki Kobayashi	June 20, 1979 (aged 28)	cm / kg	23	1						
4	DF	Kunie Kitamoto	September 18, 1981 (aged 26)	cm / kg	28	0						
5	DF	Hiroyuki Komoto	September 4, 1985 (aged 22)	cm / kg	10	0						
6	MF	Kim Nam-Il	March 14, 1977 (aged 30)	cm / kg	31	1						
7	MF	Park Kang-Jo	January 24, 1980 (aged 28)	cm / kg	6	0						
8	MF	Keisuke Kurihara	May 20, 1973 (aged 34)	cm / kg	29	4						
9	FW	Leandro	February 12, 1985 (aged 23)	cm / kg	25	7						
10	MF	Raphael Botti	February 23, 1981 (aged 27)	cm / kg	30	3						
11	FW	Shota Matsuhashi	August 3, 1982 (aged 25)	cm / kg	5	0						
13	FW	Yoshito Ōkubo	June 9, 1982 (aged 25)	cm / kg	31	11						
14	MF	Tomoyuki Sakai	June 29, 1979 (aged 28)	cm / kg	0	0						
15	DF	Toshihiko Uchiyama	October 21, 1978 (aged 29)	cm / kg	27	1						
16	MF	Seiji Koga	August 7, 1979 (aged 28)	cm / kg	13	0						
17	FW	Takayuki Yoshida	March 14, 1977 (aged 30)	cm / kg	30	5						
18	MF	Hideo Tanaka	March 1, 1983 (aged 25)	cm / kg	27	2						
19	FW	Daisuke Sudo	April 25, 1977 (aged 30)	cm / kg	5	0						
20	MF	Norio Suzuki	February 14, 1984 (aged 24)	cm / kg	26	2						
21	FW	Hiroto Mogi	March 2, 1984 (aged 24)	cm / kg	0	0						
22	MF	Kenji Baba	July 7, 1985 (aged 22)	cm / kg	16	0						
23	DF	Gakuto Kondo	February 10, 1981 (aged 27)	cm / kg	1	0						
24	MF	Masatoshi Mihara	August 2, 1988 (aged 19)	cm / kg	0	0						
25	DF	Yosuke Ishibitsu	July 23, 1983 (aged 24)	cm / kg	28	2						
26	MF	Ryosuke Matsuoka	October 23, 1984 (aged 23)	cm / kg	28	0						
27	FW	Hiroki Kishida	June 7, 1981 (aged 26)	cm / kg	9	0						
28	MF	Takayuki Toyomitsu	April 2, 1987 (aged 20)	cm / kg	0	0						
29	GK	Takahide Kishi	April 28, 1987 (aged 20)	cm / kg	0	0						
30	GK	Kenta Tokushige	March 9, 1984 (aged 23)	cm / kg	9	0						
31	DF	Kiyokazu Masuda	May 13, 1987 (aged 20)	cm / kg	0	0						
32	DF	Masaki Yanagawa	May 1, 1987 (aged 20)	cm / kg	10	0						
33	GK	Kohei Doi	December 24, 1988 (aged 19)	cm / kg	0	0						
34	MF	Keita Sogabe	July 2, 1988 (aged 19)	cm / kg	0	0						
35	MF	Masahiro Ito	November 9, 1988 (aged 19)	cm / kg	0	0						
36	DF	Keiichi Misawa	June 11, 1988 (aged 19)	cm / kg	0	0						
37	FW	Nobuhiro Uetani	May 15, 1989 (aged 18)	cm / kg	0	0						

== Other pages ==
- (in Japanese) J. League official site
