= 2007 Vissel Kobe season =

Vissel Kobe
2007 season
- Manager: Hiroshi Matsuda
- Stadium: Home's Stadium Kobe
- J. League 1: 10th
- Emperor's Cup: 5th Round
- J. League Cup: GL-A 4th
- Top goalscorer: Botti (15)

2007 Vissel Kobe season

== Competitions ==
| Competitions | Position |
|---|---|
| J. League 1 | 10th / 18 clubs |
| Emperor's Cup | 5th Round |
| J. League Cup | GL-A 4th / 4 clubs |

== Domestic results ==
=== J. League 1 ===
| Match | Date | Venue | Opponents | Score |
|---|---|---|---|---|
| 1 | 2007.. | | | - |
| 2 | 2007.. | | | - |
| 3 | 2007.. | | | - |
| 4 | 2007.. | | | - |
| 5 | 2007.. | | | - |
| 6 | 2007.. | | | - |
| 7 | 2007.. | | | - |
| 8 | 2007.. | | | - |
| 9 | 2007.. | | | - |
| 10 | 2007.. | | | - |
| 11 | 2007.. | | | - |
| 12 | 2007.. | | | - |
| 13 | 2007.. | | | - |
| 14 | 2007.. | | | - |
| 15 | 2007.. | | | - |
| 16 | 2007.. | | | - |
| 17 | 2007.. | | | - |
| 18 | 2007.. | | | - |
| 19 | 2007.. | | | - |
| 20 | 2007.. | | | - |
| 21 | 2007.. | | | - |
| 22 | 2007.. | | | - |
| 23 | 2007.. | | | - |
| 24 | 2007.. | | | - |
| 25 | 2007.. | | | - |
| 26 | 2007.. | | | - |
| 27 | 2007.. | | | - |
| 28 | 2007.. | | | - |
| 29 | 2007.. | | | - |
| 30 | 2007.. | | | - |
| 31 | 2007.. | | | - |
| 32 | 2007.. | | | - |
| 33 | 2007.. | | | - |
| 34 | 2007.. | | | - |

=== Emperor's Cup ===
| Match | Date | Venue | Opponents | Score |
|---|---|---|---|---|
| 4th Round | 2007.. | | | - |
| 5th Round | 2007.. | | | - |

=== J. League Cup ===
| Match | Date | Venue | Opponents | Score |
|---|---|---|---|---|
| GL-A-1 | 2007.. | | | - |
| GL-A-2 | 2007.. | | | - |
| GL-A-3 | 2007.. | | | - |
| GL-A-4 | 2007.. | | | - |
| GL-A-5 | 2007.. | | | - |
| GL-A-6 | 2007.. | | | - |

== Player statistics ==
| No. | Pos. | Player | D.o.B. (Age) | Height / Weight | J. League 1 | | Emperor's Cup | | J. League Cup | | Total | |
| No. | Pos. | Player | D.o.B. (Age) | Height / Weight | Apps | Goals | Apps | Goals | Apps | Goals | Apps | Goals |
|---|---|---|---|---|---|---|---|---|---|---|---|---|
| 1 | GK | Tatsuya Enomoto | March 16, 1979 (aged 27) | cm / kg | 31 | 0 | | | | | | |
| 2 | DF | Teruaki Kobayashi | June 20, 1979 (aged 27) | cm / kg | 5 | 0 | | | | | | |
| 3 | DF | Shusuke Tsubouchi | May 5, 1983 (aged 23) | cm / kg | 13 | 0 | | | | | | |
| 4 | DF | Kunie Kitamoto | September 18, 1981 (aged 25) | cm / kg | 33 | 2 | | | | | | |
| 5 | DF | Hiroyuki Komoto | September 4, 1985 (aged 21) | cm / kg | 27 | 2 | | | | | | |
| 6 | DF | Emerson Thome | March 30, 1972 (aged 34) | cm / kg | 9 | 0 | | | | | | |
| 7 | MF | Park Kang-Jo | January 24, 1980 (aged 27) | cm / kg | 31 | 4 | | | | | | |
| 8 | MF | Keisuke Kurihara | May 20, 1973 (aged 33) | cm / kg | 26 | 3 | | | | | | |
| 9 | FW | Leandro | February 12, 1985 (aged 22) | cm / kg | 32 | 15 | | | | | | |
| 10 | MF | Raphael Botti | February 23, 1981 (aged 26) | cm / kg | 31 | 1 | | | | | | |
| 11 | FW | Hiroto Mogi | March 2, 1984 (aged 23) | cm / kg | 24 | 1 | | | | | | |
| 13 | FW | Yoshito Ōkubo | June 9, 1982 (aged 24) | cm / kg | 31 | 14 | | | | | | |
| 14 | FW | Tomoyuki Hirase | May 23, 1977 (aged 29) | cm / kg | 3 | 0 | | | | | | |
| 15 | DF | Toshihiko Uchiyama | October 21, 1978 (aged 28) | cm / kg | 19 | 0 | | | | | | |
| 16 | FW | Hiroki Kishida | June 7, 1981 (aged 25) | cm / kg | 5 | 0 | | | | | | |
| 17 | MF | Atsuhiro Miura | July 24, 1974 (aged 32) | cm / kg | 5 | 0 | | | | | | |
| 18 | MF | Hideo Tanaka | March 1, 1983 (aged 24) | cm / kg | 29 | 2 | | | | | | |
| 19 | FW | Yusuke Kondo | December 5, 1984 (aged 22) | cm / kg | 31 | 6 | | | | | | |
| 20 | MF | Jun Marques Davidson | June 7, 1983 (aged 23) | cm / kg | 10 | 0 | | | | | | |
| 21 | GK | Kota Ogi | May 5, 1983 (aged 23) | cm / kg | 0 | 0 | | | | | | |
| 22 | DF | Masaki Yanagawa | May 1, 1987 (aged 19) | cm / kg | 2 | 0 | | | | | | |
| 23 | MF | Kim Tae-Yeon | June 27, 1988 (aged 18) | cm / kg | 5 | 0 | | | | | | |
| 24 | DF | Gakuto Kondo | February 10, 1981 (aged 26) | cm / kg | 0 | 0 | | | | | | |
| 25 | DF | Yosuke Ishibitsu | July 23, 1983 (aged 23) | cm / kg | 27 | 1 | | | | | | |
| 26 | MF | Ryosuke Matsuoka | October 23, 1984 (aged 22) | cm / kg | 0 | 0 | | | | | | |
| 27 | MF | Gabriel | September 8, 1987 (aged 19) | cm / kg | 7 | 1 | | | | | | |
| 28 | MF | Takayuki Toyomitsu | April 2, 1987 (aged 19) | cm / kg | 0 | 0 | | | | | | |
| 29 | GK | Takahide Kishi | April 28, 1987 (aged 19) | cm / kg | 0 | 0 | | | | | | |
| 30 | GK | Kenta Tokushige | March 9, 1984 (aged 22) | cm / kg | 5 | 0 | | | | | | |
| 31 | DF | Kiyokazu Masuda | May 13, 1987 (aged 19) | cm / kg | 0 | 0 | | | | | | |
| 32 | FW | Yuji Oe | April 20, 1986 (aged 20) | cm / kg | 0 | 0 | | | | | | |
| 33 | FW | Shingo Kinoshita | September 25, 1987 (aged 19) | cm / kg | 0 | 0 | | | | | | |
| 34 | MF | Yusuke Nakamura | October 6, 1986 (aged 20) | cm / kg | 0 | 0 | | | | | | |
| 35 | MF | Masatoshi Mihara | August 2, 1988 (aged 18) | cm / kg | 0 | 0 | | | | | | |
| 36 | MF | Akihiro Endō | September 18, 1975 (aged 31) | cm / kg | 3 | 0 | | | | | | |
| 37 | DF | Keiichi Misawa | June 11, 1988 (aged 18) | cm / kg | 0 | 0 | | | | | | |
| 38 | FW | Ryota Doi | August 27, 1987 (aged 19) | cm / kg | 2 | 0 | | | | | | |
| 39 | GK | Kohei Doi | December 24, 1988 (aged 18) | cm / kg | 0 | 0 | | | | | | |
| 40 | DF | Tomohisa Nakata | May 11, 1987 (aged 19) | cm / kg | 0 | 0 | | | | | | |
| 41 | MF | Keita Sogabe | July 2, 1988 (aged 18) | cm / kg | 0 | 0 | | | | | | |
| 42 | MF | Masahiro Ito | November 9, 1988 (aged 18) | cm / kg | 0 | 0 | | | | | | |
| 43 | MF | Sho Okubo | April 2, 1988 (aged 18) | cm / kg | 0 | 0 | | | | | | |
| 44 | MF | Tomoyuki Sakai | June 29, 1979 (aged 27) | cm / kg | 10 | 0 | | | | | | |
| 45 | MF | Seiji Koga | August 7, 1979 (aged 27) | cm / kg | 11 | 3 | | | | | | |

== Other pages ==
- (in Japanese) J. League official site
