= 2009 Vissel Kobe season =

Vissel Kobe
2009 season
- Manager: Caio Júnior; Masahiro Wada; Toshiya Miura
- Stadium: Home's Stadium Kobe
- J. League 1: 14th
- Emperor's Cup: 4th Round
- J. League Cup: GL-B 6th
- Top goalscorer: Hiroto Mogi (8); Yoshito Ōkubo (8)

2009 Vissel Kobe season

== Competitions ==
Competitions	Position
J. League 1	14th / 18 clubs
Emperor's Cup	4th Round
J. League Cup	GL-B 6th / 7 clubs

== Player statistics ==
No.	Pos.	Player	D.o.B. (Age)	Height / Weight	J. League 1		Emperor's Cup		J. League Cup		Total	
No.	Pos.	Player	D.o.B. (Age)	Height / Weight	Apps	Goals	Apps	Goals	Apps	Goals	Apps	Goals
1	GK	Tatsuya Enomoto	March 16, 1979 (aged 29)	cm / kg	34	0						
2	DF	Teruaki Kobayashi	June 20, 1979 (aged 29)	cm / kg	12	0						
3	DF	Masaki Yanagawa	May 1, 1987 (aged 21)	cm / kg	2	0						
4	DF	Kunie Kitamoto	September 18, 1981 (aged 27)	cm / kg	32	1						
5	DF	Hiroyuki Komoto	September 4, 1985 (aged 23)	cm / kg	23	2						
6	MF	Kim Nam-Il	March 14, 1977 (aged 31)	cm / kg	23	0						
7	MF	Park Kang-Jo	January 24, 1980 (aged 29)	cm / kg	22	5						
8	MF	Alan Bahia	January 14, 1983 (aged 26)	cm / kg	9	0						
9	FW	Marcel	November 12, 1981 (aged 27)	cm / kg	10	3						
10	MF	Raphael Botti	February 23, 1981 (aged 28)	cm / kg	26	0						
11	FW	Shota Matsuhashi	August 3, 1982 (aged 26)	cm / kg	8	1						
13	FW	Kazuki Ganaha	September 26, 1980 (aged 28)	cm / kg	11	0						
14	DF	Tsuneyasu Miyamoto	February 7, 1977 (aged 32)	cm / kg	32	1						
15	DF	Toshihiko Uchiyama	October 21, 1978 (aged 30)	cm / kg	12	0						
16	MF	Seiji Koga	August 7, 1979 (aged 29)	cm / kg	10	0						
17	FW	Takayuki Yoshida	March 14, 1977 (aged 31)	cm / kg	29	5						
18	MF	Hideo Tanaka	March 1, 1983 (aged 26)	cm / kg	23	1						
19	FW	Daisuke Sudo	April 25, 1977 (aged 31)	cm / kg	2	1						
20	MF	Norio Suzuki	February 14, 1984 (aged 25)	cm / kg	4	0						
21	FW	Hiroto Mogi	March 2, 1984 (aged 25)	cm / kg	31	8						
22	MF	Kenji Baba	July 7, 1985 (aged 23)	cm / kg	13	1						
23	DF	Gakuto Kondo	February 10, 1981 (aged 28)	cm / kg	4	0						
24	MF	Masatoshi Mihara	August 2, 1988 (aged 20)	cm / kg	0	0						
25	DF	Yosuke Ishibitsu	July 23, 1983 (aged 25)	cm / kg	30	2						
26	MF	Ryosuke Matsuoka	October 23, 1984 (aged 24)	cm / kg	29	1						
27	FW	Hiroki Kishida	June 7, 1981 (aged 27)	cm / kg	7	0						
28	DF	Tsubasa Oya	August 13, 1986 (aged 22)	cm / kg	3	0						
29	GK	Takahide Kishi	April 28, 1987 (aged 21)	cm / kg	0	0						
30	GK	Kenta Tokushige	March 9, 1984 (aged 24)	cm / kg	0	0						
31	MF	Akihito Kusunose	December 4, 1986 (aged 22)	cm / kg	7	0						
32	FW	Nobuhiro Uetani	May 15, 1989 (aged 19)	cm / kg	0	0						
33	DF	Ryuhei Niwa	January 13, 1986 (aged 23)	cm / kg	3	0						
34	GK	Kohei Doi	December 24, 1988 (aged 20)	cm / kg	0	0						
50	FW	Yoshito Ōkubo	June 9, 1982 (aged 26)	cm / kg	19	8						

== Other pages ==
- (in Japanese) J. League official site
