= 2010 Vissel Kobe season =

Vissel Kobe
2010 season
- Manager: Toshiya Miura; Masahiro Wada
- Stadium: Home's Stadium Kobe
- J. League 1: 15th
- Emperor's Cup: 3rd Round
- J. League Cup: GL-B 6th
- Top goalscorer: Popó (9)

2010 Vissel Kobe season

== Competitions ==
Competitions	Position
J. League 1	15th / 18 clubs
Emperor's Cup	3rd Round
J. League Cup	GL-B 6th / 7 clubs

=== J. League 1 ===
Pos	Team	Pld	W	D	L	GF	GA	GD	Pts	Qualification or relegation
13	Montedio Yamagata	34	11	9	14	29	42	−13	42	
14	Vegalta Sendai	34	10	9	15	40	46	−6	39	
15	Vissel Kobe	34	9	11	14	37	45	−8	38	
16	FC Tokyo (R)	34	8	12	14	36	41	−5	36	Relegation to 2011 J.League Division 2
17	Kyoto Sanga (R)	34	4	7	23	30	60	−30	19	Relegation to 2011 J.League Division 2

Updated to match(es) played on December 4, 2010. Source: J.League Division 1
Rules for classification: 1) points; 2) goal difference; 3) number of goals scored.
(R) Relegated

== Player statistics ==
No.	Pos.	Player	D.o.B. (Age)	Height / Weight	J. League 1		Emperor's Cup		J. League Cup		Total	
No.	Pos.	Player	D.o.B. (Age)	Height / Weight	Apps	Goals	Apps	Goals	Apps	Goals	Apps	Goals
1	GK	Tatsuya Enomoto	March 16, 1979 (aged 30)	cm / kg	17	0						
2	DF	Teruaki Kobayashi	June 20, 1979 (aged 30)	cm / kg	12	0						
4	DF	Kunie Kitamoto	September 18, 1981 (aged 28)	cm / kg	33	0						
5	DF	Hiroyuki Komoto	September 4, 1985 (aged 24)	cm / kg	31	1						
6	MF	Edmilson Alves	February 17, 1976 (aged 34)	cm / kg	23	0						
7	MF	Park Kang-Jo	January 24, 1980 (aged 30)	cm / kg	30	4						
8	MF	Ryosuke Matsuoka	October 23, 1984 (aged 25)	cm / kg	23	1						
9	FW	Kazuki Ganaha	September 26, 1980 (aged 29)	cm / kg	8	0						
10	MF	Raphael Botti	February 23, 1981 (aged 29)	cm / kg	27	3						
11	FW	Popó	September 1, 1978 (aged 31)	cm / kg	29	9						
13	FW	Yoshito Ōkubo	June 9, 1982 (aged 27)	cm / kg	17	4						
14	DF	Tsuneyasu Miyamoto	February 7, 1977 (aged 33)	cm / kg	6	0						
15	DF	Tsubasa Oya	August 13, 1986 (aged 23)	cm / kg	0	0						
16	MF	Akihito Kusunose	December 4, 1986 (aged 23)	cm / kg	2	0						
17	FW	Takayuki Yoshida	March 14, 1977 (aged 32)	cm / kg	21	4						
18	MF	Hideo Tanaka	March 1, 1983 (aged 27)	cm / kg	15	0						
19	FW	Koki Arita	September 23, 1991 (aged 18)	cm / kg	1	0						
20	MF	Ryota Morioka	April 12, 1991 (aged 18)	cm / kg	8	0						
21	FW	Hiroto Mogi	March 2, 1984 (aged 26)	cm / kg	33	2						
23	DF	Gakuto Kondo	February 10, 1981 (aged 29)	cm / kg	7	1						
24	MF	Masatoshi Mihara	August 2, 1988 (aged 21)	cm / kg	23	1						
25	DF	Yosuke Ishibitsu	July 23, 1983 (aged 26)	cm / kg	28	0						
26	DF	Yutaro Takahashi	October 3, 1987 (aged 22)	cm / kg	0	0						
27	FW	Ken Tokura	June 16, 1986 (aged 23)	cm / kg	19	4						
28	GK	Jun Kamita	January 17, 1992 (aged 18)	cm / kg	0	0						
29	GK	Takahide Kishi	April 28, 1987 (aged 22)	cm / kg	5	0						
30	GK	Kenta Tokushige	March 9, 1984 (aged 25)	cm / kg	13	0						
31	FW	Keijiro Ogawa	July 14, 1992 (aged 17)	cm / kg	15	2						
32	FW	Kohei Mishima	April 15, 1987 (aged 22)	cm / kg	0	0						
33	DF	Daisuke Tomita	April 24, 1977 (aged 32)	cm / kg	6	0						
34	FW	Lee Jae-Min	May 29, 1987 (aged 22)	cm / kg	13	0						
35	FW	Kensuke Nagai	March 5, 1989 (aged 21)	cm / kg	3	0						

== Other pages ==
- (in Japanese) J. League official site
