= Park Kang-jo =

Zainichi Korean footballer (born 1980)

Park Kang-jo 박강조
Personal information
- Date of birth: 24 January 1980 (age 46)
- Place of birth: Amagasaki, Hyōgo, Japan
- Height: 1.65 m (5 ft 5 in)
- Position: Midfielder

Youth career
- 1995–1997: Takigawa Daini High School

Senior career*
Years	Team	Apps	(Gls)
1998–1999	Kyoto Purple Sanga	1	(0)
2000–2002	Seongnam Ilhwa Chunma	44	(0)
2003–2012	Vissel Kobe	251	(30)
Total		296	(30)

International career
2000	South Korea U23	1	(0)
2000	South Korea	5	(1)
- * Club domestic league appearances and goals

- Park Kang-jo
- Hangul: 박강조
- Hanja: 朴康造
- RR: Bak Gangjo
- MR: Pak Kangjo

Park Kang-jo (Korean: 박강조; born 24 January 1980) is a former professional footballer who played as a midfielder. He is currently the manager of Atletico Suzuka. Born in Japan, he made five appearances for South Korea national team scoring once.

== International career ==
On 28 May 2000, Park made his debut for the South Korea national team in a friendly against FR Yugoslavia.

== Career statistics ==
=== Club ===
Appearances and goals by club, season and competition
Club	Season	League			National cup (Note: Includes Emperor's Cup & Korean FA Cup.)		League cup (Note: Includes J. League Cup & K-League Cup.)		Total	
Club	Season	Division	Apps	Goals	Apps	Goals	Apps	Goals	Apps	Goals
Kyoto Purple Sanga	1998	J1 League	0	0	0	0	0	0	0	0
Kyoto Purple Sanga	1999	J1 League	1	0	0	0	0	0	1	0
Kyoto Purple Sanga	Total		1	0	0	0	0	0	1	0
Seongnam Ilhwa Chunma	2000	K-League	16	0	4	0	3	0	23	0
Seongnam Ilhwa Chunma	2001	K-League	12	0	0	0	8	1	20	1
Seongnam Ilhwa Chunma	2002	K-League	16	0			1	0		
Seongnam Ilhwa Chunma	Total		44	0			12	1		
Vissel Kobe	2003	J1 League	13	0	3	1	1	0	17	1
Vissel Kobe	2004	J1 League	26	0	1	0	6	0	33	0
Vissel Kobe	2005	J1 League	33	2	1	1	6	0	40	3
Vissel Kobe	2006	J2 League	43	10	0	0	-	-	43	10
Vissel Kobe	2007	J1 League	31	4	2	1	6	0	39	5
Vissel Kobe	2008	J1 League	6	0	2	1	1	0	9	1
Vissel Kobe	2009	J1 League	22	5	0	0	4	0	26	5
Vissel Kobe	2010	J1 League	30	4	1	0	1	0	32	4
Vissel Kobe	2011	J1 League	27	5	2	1	2	0	31	6
Vissel Kobe	2012	J1 League	20	0	1	0	5	0	26	0
Vissel Kobe	Total		251	30	13	5	32	0	296	35
Career total			296	30			44	1		

=== International ===
Korea Republic national team
Year	Apps	Goals
2000	5	1
Total	5	1

Results list South Korea's goal tally first.

Date	Venue	Opponent	Score	Result	Competition
9 June 2000	Teheran, Iran	Egypt	1 goal	1–0	2000 LG Cup
