= Takahito Soma =

Japanese footballer (born 1981)

Takahito Soma 相馬 崇人
Personal information
- Full name: Takahito Soma
- Date of birth: December 10, 1981 (age 44)
- Place of birth: Kawasaki, Kanagawa, Japan
- Height: 1.76 m (5 ft 9 1/2 in)
- Position: Defender

Youth career
- 1997–1999: Verdy Kawasaki

College career
Years	Team	Apps	(Gls)
2000–2002	Kokushikan University		

Senior career*
Years	Team	Apps	(Gls)
2003–2005	Tokyo Verdy	40	(2)
2006–2008	Urawa Reds	58	(4)
2009–2010	Marítimo	27	(2)
2010–2011	Energie Cottbus	21	(1)
2011–2016	Vissel Kobe	114	(6)
Total		260	(15)
Medal record
Tokyo Verdy
Winner	Emperor's Cup	2004
Urawa Reds
Winner	AFC Champions League	2007
Winner	J1 League	2006
Runner-up	J1 League	2007
Winner	Emperor's Cup	2006
- * Club domestic league appearances and goals

Takahito Soma (相馬 崇人, Sōma Takahito; born December 10, 1981) is a former Japanese football player.

== Playing career ==
Soma was born in Kawasaki on December 10, 1981. After playing for Verdy Kawasaki (later Tokyo Verdy) youth team, he went on to Kokushikan University. When he was a Kokushikan University student, he joined J1 League club Tokyo Verdy in 2003. In September 2004, he became a regular left side back instead regular player Atsuhiro Miura left Verdy for Japan national team. Verdy won the champions in 2004 Emperor's Cup. Although Soma also played as regular player in 2005, Verdy finished at the 17th place in 2005 season and was relegated to J2 League.

In 2006, Soma moved to J1 club Urawa Reds. He played many matches as substitute left side midfielder because Alessandro Santos played as regular player. In 2007, Although Santos left the club, Soma could not play many matches behind Tadaaki Hirakawa. In 2008, Soma became a regular player as left side midfielder. Reds won the champions in 2006 J1 League, 2006 Emperor's Cup and 2007 AFC Champions League in 3 seasons.

On January 12, 2009, after a three-year contract with the Urawa Reds had come to an end, Soma decided to forgo contract extension talks to pursue a career overseas in Europe. On January 29, 2009 Soma signed with Marítimo of the Primeira Liga, on a one-and-a-half-year contract. At the end of this contract, he left Portugal and signed with 2. Bundesliga club Energie Cottbus.

In July 2011, Soma returned to Japan and joined J1 League club Vissel Kobe. Although he could not play many matches for injury in 2011, he played as regular left side back in 2012. However Vissel finished at the 16th place in 2012 season and was relegated to J2 League. Although his opportunity to play decreased for injury in 2013, Vissel was returned to J1 in a year. After six seasons with Vissel, he announced his retirement.

== Club statistics ==
Club performance			League		Cup		League Cup		Continental		Total	
Season	Club	League	Apps	Goals	Apps	Goals	Apps	Goals	Apps	Goals	Apps	Goals
Japan			League		Emperor's Cup		J.League Cup		AFC		Total	
2000	Kokushikan University	Football League	7	0	-		-		-		7	0
2001	Kokushikan University	Football League	5	0	-		-		-		5	0
2002	Kokushikan University	Football League	2	0			-		-		2	0
Total			14	0	0	0	-		-		14	0
2003	Tokyo Verdy	J1 League	1	0	0	0	0	0	-		1	0
2004	Tokyo Verdy	J1 League	11	2	5	0	8	0	-		24	2
2005	Tokyo Verdy	J1 League	28	0	0	0	5	0	-		33	0
Total			40	2	5	0	13	0	-		58	2
2006	Urawa Reds	J1 League	18	1	5	0	7	1	-		30	2
2007	Urawa Reds	J1 League	13	0	1	0	2	0	6*	0	22	0
2008	Urawa Reds	J1 League	27	3	1	0	6	0	3	1	37	4
Total			58	4	7	0	15	1	9	1	89	6
Portugal			League		Taça de Portugal		Taça da Liga		Europe		Total	
2008/09	Marítimo	Primeira Liga	10	0	-		-		-		10	0
2009/10	Marítimo	Primeira Liga	17	2	0	0	2	0	-		19	2
Total			27	2	0	0	2	0	-		29	2
Germany			League		DFB-Pokal		DFB Ligapokal		Europe		Total	
2010–11	Energie Cottbus	2. Bundesliga	21	1	2	0	-		-		23	1
Total			21	1	2	0	-		-		23	1
Japan			League		Emperor's Cup		J.League Cup		AFC		Total	
2011	Vissel Kobe	J1 League	8	1	2	0	0	0	–		10	1
2012	Vissel Kobe	J1 League	32	2	1	0	5	0	–		38	2
2013	Vissel Kobe	J2 League	18	1	2	0	–		–		20	1
2014	Vissel Kobe	J1 League	16	0	0	0	4	0	–		20	0
2015	Vissel Kobe	J1 League	23	0	2	0	6	0	–		31	0
2016	Vissel Kobe	J1 League	17	2	0	0	5	1	–		22	3
Total			114	6	7	0	20	1	–		141	7
Career total			274	15	21	0	50	2	9	1	354	18

(*) Includes 3 matches at FIFA Club World Cup

== Awards and honours ==
=== Club ===
Tokyo Verdy

- Emperor's Cup: 2004

Urawa Reds

- AFC Champions League: 2007
- J1 League: 2006
- Emperor's Cup: 2006
- Japanese Super Cup: 2006
