= Kunie Kitamoto =

Japanese footballer

Kunie Kitamoto 北本 久仁衛
Personal information
- Full name: Kunie Kitamoto
- Date of birth: September 18, 1981 (age 45)
- Place of birth: Nara, Nara, Japan
- Height: 1.81 m (5 ft 11 in)
- Position: Defender

Team information
- Current team: Vissel Kobe (Assistant)

Youth career
- 1997–1999: Nara Ikuei High School

Senior career*
Years	Team	Apps	(Gls)
2000–2018	Vissel Kobe	394	(16)
2019	Simork	4	(0)
2019	Chamchuri United		
Total		398	(16)
- * Club domestic league appearances and goals

Kunie Kitamoto (北本 久仁衛, Kitamoto Kunie; born September 18, 1981) is a Japanese football player, he is currently assistant manager of Vissel Kobe.

== Playing career ==
Kitamoto was born in Nara on September 18, 1981. After graduating from high school, he joined J1 League club Vissel Kobe in 2000. He debuted in 2001 and became a regular player as center back in 2002. Although Vissel played in J2 League in 2006 season, played in J1 for a long time. He also played many matches as regular player for a long time. However Vissel was relegated to J2 again end of 2012 season. Although the club was promoted to J1 in a year, his opportunity to play decreased from 2013 season. After 19 years at Vissel Kobe, Kitamoto left the club after the 2018 season.

== Club statistics ==
Club performance			League		Cup		League Cup		Total	
Season	Club	League	Apps	Goals	Apps	Goals	Apps	Goals	Apps	Goals
Japan			League		Emperor's Cup		J.League Cup		Total	
2000	Vissel Kobe	J1 League	0	0	0	0	0	0	0	0
2001	Vissel Kobe	J1 League	6	0	2	0	2	0	10	0
2002	Vissel Kobe	J1 League	22	1	1	0	0	0	23	1
2003	Vissel Kobe	J1 League	24	1	3	0	2	0	29	1
2004	Vissel Kobe	J1 League	27	2	0	0	6	0	33	2
2005	Vissel Kobe	J1 League	33	1	1	0	6	0	40	1
2006	Vissel Kobe	J2 League	43	5	0	0	-		43	5
2007	Vissel Kobe	J1 League	33	2	2	0	6	0	41	2
2008	Vissel Kobe	J1 League	28	0	2	0	5	0	35	0
2009	Vissel Kobe	J1 League	32	1	3	0	6	0	41	1
2010	Vissel Kobe	J1 League	33	0	0	0	6	0	39	0
2011	Vissel Kobe	J1 League	34	2	1	0	2	0	37	2
2012	Vissel Kobe	J1 League	29	0	0	0	3	0	32	0
2013	Vissel Kobe	J2 League	10	0	1	1	-		11	1
2014	Vissel Kobe	J1 League	7	0	0	0	2	0	9	0
2015	Vissel Kobe	J1 League	12	0	2	0	2	0	14	0
2016	Vissel Kobe	J1 League	14	1	0	0	3	0	17	1
2017	Vissel Kobe	J1 League	6	0	2	0	3	0	11	0
2018	Vissel Kobe	J1 League	1	0	0	0	6	0	7	0
Career total			394	16	20	1	60	0	474	17
