= Tatsuya Enomoto =

Japanese footballer

Tatsuya Enomoto 榎本 達也
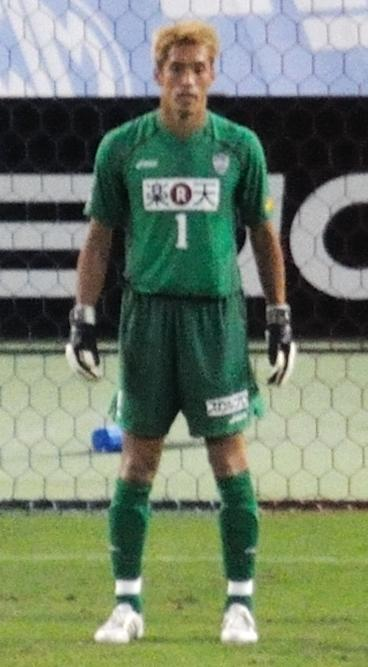

Personal information
- Full name: Tatsuya Enomoto
- Date of birth: 16 March 1979 (age 47)
- Place of birth: Nerima, Tokyo, Japan
- Height: 1.90 m (6 ft 3 in)
- Position: Goalkeeper

Youth career
- 1994–1996: Urawa Gakuin High School

Senior career*
Years	Team	Apps	(Gls)
1997–2006	Yokohama F. Marinos	112	(0)
2007–2010	Vissel Kobe	107	(0)
2011–2012	Tokushima Vortis	14	(0)
2013–2014	Tochigi SC	46	(0)
2015–2016	FC Tokyo	4	(0)
2016	→ FC Tokyo U-23	7	(0)
Total		290	(0)
Medal record
Yokohama F. Marinos
Winner	J1 League	2003
Winner	J1 League	2004
Runner-up	J1 League	2000
Runner-up	J1 League	2002
Winner	J.League Cup	2001
Representing Japan
FIFA U-20 World Cup
Silver medal – second place	1999 Nigeria
AFC U-19 Championship
Silver medal – second place	1998 Thailand
- * Club domestic league appearances and goals

Tatsuya Enomoto (榎本 達也, Enomoto Tatsuya; born 16 March 1979) is a former Japanese football player.

== Club career ==
Enomoto was born in Nerima, Tokyo on 16 March 1979. After graduating from high school, he joined Yokohama Marinos (later Yokohama F. Marinos) in 1997. He became a regular goalkeeper in October 2001, when Japan national team goalkeeper Yoshikatsu Kawaguchi moved to England. Shortly thereafter, 2001 J.League Cup Final on 27 October, he made three saves in the penalty shootout, and the club won the champions. He was also elected MVP award. The club won the champions 2003 and 2004 J1 League. However his opportunity to play decreased behind Tetsuya Enomoto from 2005. He moved to Vissel Kobe in 2007. He played as regular goalkeeper. His opportunity to play decreased behind Kenta Tokushige in 2010 and moved to J2 League club Tokushima Vortis in 2011. However he could hardly play in the match behind Oh Seung-hoon and he moved to Tochigi SC in 2013. In 2015, he moved to FC Tokyo. Although he came back J1 League, he could hardly play in the match and retired end of 2016 season.

== National team career ==
In April 1999, Enomoto was selected Japan U-20 national team for 1999 World Youth Championship and Japan won the 2nd place. But he did not play in the match, as he was the team's reserve goalkeeper behind Yuta Minami.

== Club statistics ==
Club performance			League		Cup		League Cup		Continental		Total	
Season	Club	League	Apps	Goals	Apps	Goals	Apps	Goals	Apps	Goals	Apps	Goals
Japan			League		Emperor's Cup		J.League Cup		Asia		Total	
1997	Yokohama Marinos	J1 League	0	0	0	0	0	0	-		0	0
1998	Yokohama Marinos	J1 League	0	0	0	0	4	0	-		4	0
1999	Yokohama F. Marinos	J1 League	0	0	0	0	0	0	-		0	0
2000	Yokohama F. Marinos	J1 League	3	0	0	0	2	0	-		5	0
2001	Yokohama F. Marinos	J1 League	5	0	1	0	3	0	-		9	0
2002	Yokohama F. Marinos	J1 League	30	0	2	0	6	0	-		38	0
2003	Yokohama F. Marinos	J1 League	15	0	2	0	4	0	-		21	0
2004	Yokohama F. Marinos	J1 League	30	0	0	0	4	0	5	0	39	0
2005	Yokohama F. Marinos	J1 League	11	0	1	0	2	0	2	0	16	0
2006	Yokohama F. Marinos	J1 League	18	0	0	0	5	0	-		23	0
2007	Vissel Kobe	J1 League	31	0	0	0	1	0	-		32	0
2008	Vissel Kobe	J1 League	25	0	0	0	6	0	-		31	0
2009	Vissel Kobe	J1 League	34	0	0	0	2	0	-		36	0
2010	Vissel Kobe	J1 League	17	0	0	0	1	0	-		18	0
2011	Tokushima Vortis	J2 League	4	0	1	0	-		-		5	0
2012	Tokushima Vortis	J2 League	10	0	0	0	-		-		10	0
2013	Tochigi SC	J2 League	36	0	1	0	-		-		37	0
2014	Tochigi SC	J2 League	10	0	0	0	-		-		10	0
2015	FC Tokyo	J1 League	4	0	2	0	3	0	-		9	0
2016	FC Tokyo	J1 League	0	0	0	0	0	0	0	0	0	0
2016	FC Tokyo U-23	J3 League	7	0	-		-		-		7	0
Career total			290	0	10	0	43	0	7	0	350	0

== Honors and awards ==
- World Youth Championship runner-up: 1999
