= Kenta Tokushige =

Japanese footballer

Kenta Tokushige 徳重 健太
Personal information
- Full name: Kenta Tokushige
- Date of birth: March 9, 1984 (age 42)
- Place of birth: Kagoshima, Japan
- Height: 1.87 m (6 ft 1 1/2 in)
- Position: Goalkeeper

Team information
- Current team: Ehime FC
- Number: 1

Youth career
- 1999–2001: Kunimi High School

Senior career*
| Years | Team | Apps | (Gls) |
| 2002–2005 | Urawa Reds | 0 | (0) |
| 2004 | → Cerezo Osaka (loan) | 1 | (0) |
| 2005–2017 | Vissel Kobe | 138 | (0) |
| 2018–2021 | V-Varen Nagasaki | 90 | (0) |
| 2022– | Ehime FC | 64 | (0) |

International career
| 2001 | Japan U-17 | 3 | (0) |
Medal record
Urawa Reds
| Runner-up | J1 League | 2004 |
| Runner-up | J1 League | 2005 |
| Winner | J.League Cup | 2003 |
| Runner-up | J.League Cup | 2002 |
| Runner-up | J.League Cup | 2004 |
| Winner | Emperor's Cup | 2005 |
Representing Japan
AFC U-19 Championship
| Silver medal – second place | 2002 Qatar |
- * Club domestic league appearances and goals as of 1 January 2026

Kenta Tokushige (徳重 健太, Tokushige Kenta; born March 9, 1984) is a Japanese football player who plays for Ehime FC.

== Club career ==
Tokushige was born in Kagoshima on March 9, 1984. After graduating from high school, he joined J1 League club Urawa Reds in 2002. However, he was behind Norihiro Yamagishi and Ryota Tsuzuki in selection.

In October 2004, he was loaned to Cerezo Osaka. He debuted against Shimizu S-Pulse on November 23. This was his only game for the club. Although he returned to Reds in 2005, he still struggled for minutes and didn't play once.

In August 2005, he moved to Vissel Kobe. Although he played several matches every season, he could not play many matches behind Kota Ogi and Tatsuya Enomoto. From summer 2010, he became a regular goalkeeper under new manager Masahiro Wada. and he played all 34 matches in 2011 season. However Vissel was relegated to J2 League at the end of 2012 season. In 2013, although he lost his position behind new player Kaito Yamamoto, he became a regular goalkeeper in June again and Vissel was promoted to J1 in a year. However he could not play many matches behind Yamamoto and Kim Seung-gyu from 2014.

In 2018, he moved to newly promoted J1 League club V-Varen Nagasaki. Although he played as a regular goalkeeper, V-Varen were relegated to J2 at the end of the 2018 season.

== National team career ==
In September 2001, Tokushige was selected for the Japan U-17 national team for the 2001 U-17 World Championship. He played in all 3 matches.

== Career statistics ==
As of end of 2018 season

| Club performance | | | League | | Cup | | League Cup | | Total | |
| Season | Club | League | Apps | Goals | Apps | Goals | Apps | Goals | Apps | Goals |
| Japan | | | League | | Emperor's Cup | | J.League Cup | | Total | |
|---|---|---|---|---|---|---|---|---|---|---|
| 2002 | Urawa Reds | J1 League | 0 | 0 | 0 | 0 | 0 | 0 | 0 | 0 |
| 2003 | Urawa Reds | J1 League | 0 | 0 | 0 | 0 | 0 | 0 | 0 | 0 |
| 2004 | Urawa Reds | J1 League | 0 | 0 | 0 | 0 | 0 | 0 | 0 | 0 |
| Total | | | 0 | 0 | 0 | 0 | 0 | 0 | 0 | 0 |
| 2004 | Cerezo Osaka | J1 League | 1 | 0 | 0 | 0 | 0 | 0 | 1 | 0 |
| Total | | | 1 | 0 | 0 | 0 | 0 | 0 | 1 | 0 |
| 2005 | Urawa Reds | J1 League | 0 | 0 | 0 | 0 | 0 | 0 | 0 | 0 |
| Total | | | 0 | 0 | 0 | 0 | 0 | 0 | 0 | 0 |
| 2005 | Vissel Kobe | J1 League | 4 | 0 | 0 | 0 | 0 | 0 | 4 | 0 |
| 2006 | Vissel Kobe | J2 League | 3 | 0 | 1 | 0 | - | | 4 | 0 |
| 2007 | Vissel Kobe | J1 League | 5 | 0 | 2 | 0 | 4 | 0 | 11 | 0 |
| 2008 | Vissel Kobe | J1 League | 9 | 0 | 2 | 0 | 0 | 0 | 11 | 0 |
| 2009 | Vissel Kobe | J1 League | 0 | 0 | 3 | 0 | 4 | 0 | 7 | 0 |
| 2010 | Vissel Kobe | J1 League | 13 | 0 | 2 | 0 | 2 | 0 | 17 | 0 |
| 2011 | Vissel Kobe | J1 League | 34 | 0 | 0 | 0 | 2 | 0 | 36 | 0 |
| 2012 | Vissel Kobe | J1 League | 31 | 0 | 1 | 0 | 3 | 0 | 35 | 0 |
| 2013 | Vissel Kobe | J2 League | 24 | 0 | 0 | 0 | - | | 24 | 0 |
| 2014 | Vissel Kobe | J1 League | 7 | 0 | 1 | 0 | 1 | 0 | 9 | 0 |
| 2015 | Vissel Kobe | J1 League | 5 | 0 | 3 | 0 | 2 | 0 | 10 | 0 |
| 2016 | Vissel Kobe | J1 League | 0 | 0 | 2 | 0 | 6 | 0 | 8 | 0 |
| 2017 | Vissel Kobe | J1 League | 3 | 0 | 2 | 0 | 3 | 0 | 8 | 0 |
| Total | | | 138 | 0 | 19 | 0 | 27 | 0 | 184 | 0 |
| 2018 | V-Varen Nagasaki | J1 League | 28 | 0 | 1 | 0 | 2 | 0 | 31 | 0 |
| 2019 | V-Varen Nagasaki | J2 League | | | | | | | | |
| Total | | | 28 | 0 | 1 | 0 | 2 | 0 | 31 | 0 |
| Career total | | | 167 | 0 | 20 | 0 | 29 | 0 | 216 | 0 |
