= Kazuki Anzai =

Japanese footballer

Personal information
- Date of birth: 7 August 1994 (age 32)
- Place of birth: Kunitachi, Tokyo, Japan
- Height: 1.72 m (5 ft 8 in)
- Position: Left back

Team information
- Current team: Okinawa SV
- Number: 24

Youth career
- 2004–2012: Tokyo Verdy

Senior career*
Years	Team	Apps	(Gls)
2013–2017	Tokyo Verdy	144	(7)
2018–2022	Sagan Tosu	23	(0)
2020	→ Renofa Yamaguchi (loan)	29	(0)
2021–2022	→ Tokyo Verdy (loan)	0	(0)
2022–	Okinawa SV		
- * Club domestic league appearances and goals as of 08:39, 4 December 2023 (UTC)

Kazuki Anzai (安在 和樹, Anzai Kazuki; born 7 August 1994) is a Japanese footballer who plays for Okinawa SV.

== Club statistics ==
Updated to 24 February 2019.

Club performance			League		Cup		League Cup		Total	
Season	Club	League	Apps	Goals	Apps	Goals	Apps	Goals	Apps	Goals
Japan			League		Emperor's Cup		J.League Cup		Total	
2013	Tokyo Verdy	J2 League	1	0	0	0	-		1	0
2014	Tokyo Verdy	J2 League	38	1	1	0	-		39	1
2015	Tokyo Verdy	J2 League	33	3	2	0	-		35	3
2016	Tokyo Verdy	J2 League	35	0	1	0	-		36	0
2017	Tokyo Verdy	J2 League	37	3	0	0	-		37	3
2018	Sagan Tosu	J1 League	16	0	2	1	5	1	23	2
Career total			160	7	6	1	5	1	171	9
