= Hiroto Mogi =

Japanese footballer

Hiroto Mogi 茂木 弘人
Personal information
- Full name: Hiroto Mogi
- Date of birth: March 2, 1984 (age 42)
- Place of birth: Fukushima, Fukushima, Japan
- Height: 1.74 m (5 ft 8 1/2 in)
- Positions: Defender; forward

Youth career
- 1999–2001: Seiko Gakuin High School

Senior career*
Years	Team	Apps	(Gls)
2002–2005	Sanfrecce Hiroshima	58	(12)
2006–2014	Vissel Kobe	202	(13)
2015–2018	Fukushima United FC	86	(6)
Total		346	(31)

International career
2001	Japan U-17	3	(0)
2003	Japan U-20	5	(0)
Medal record
Representing Japan
AFC U-19 Championship
Silver medal – second place	2002 Qatar
- * Club domestic league appearances and goals as of 1 January 2019

Hiroto Mogi (茂木 弘人, Mogi Hiroto; born March 2, 1984) is a former Japanese football player.

== Club career ==
Mogi was born in Fukushima on March 2, 1984. After graduating from high school, he joined J1 League club Sanfrecce Hiroshima in 2002. Although Sanfrecce repeated relegation to J2 League and promotion to J1, he got an opportunity to play as forward from first season. However he could not become a regular player and he could hardly play in the match from summer 2005. In 2006, he moved to J2 club Vissel Kobe. He played many matches and Vissel was promoted to J1 end of 2006 season. In 2007, he was converted to side back and played many matches as right and left side back.

Although he could hardly play in the match for injury in 2008, he played as regular player as side back from 2009. However Vissel was relegated to J2 end of 2012 season. Despite Vissel conquered a promotion to J1 in 2013 season, his opportunity to play decreased from that year. In 2015, he returned to his local and joined J3 League club Fukushima United FC. He played many matches as forward and side back every season. He retired end of 2018 season.

== National team career ==
In September 2001, Mogi was selected Japan U-17 national team for 2001 U-17 World Championship. He played as forward in all 3 matches. In November 2003, he was also selected Japan U-20 national team for 2003 World Youth Championship. He played as forward in all 5 matches.

== Career statistics ==
Updated to 1 January 2019.

Appearances and goals by club, season and competition
Club	Season	League			Emperor's Cup		J.League Cup		Total	
Club	Season	Division	Apps	Goals	Apps	Goals	Apps	Goals	Apps	Goals
Sanfrecce Hiroshima	2002	J1 League	15	2	3	0	1	0	19	2
Sanfrecce Hiroshima	2003	J2 League	23	5	1	0	—		24	5
Sanfrecce Hiroshima	2004	J1 League	8	1	0	0	2	1	10	2
Sanfrecce Hiroshima	2005	J1 League	12	4	0	0	4	0	16	4
Vissel Kobe	2006	J2 League	37	0	1	0	—		38	0
Vissel Kobe	2007	J1 League	24	1	1	0	3	0	28	1
Vissel Kobe	2008	J1 League	0	0	1	0	0	0	1	0
Vissel Kobe	2009	J1 League	31	8	3	3	5	0	39	11
Vissel Kobe	2010	J1 League	33	2	2	1	6	2	41	5
Vissel Kobe	2011	J1 League	27	1	0	0	2	0	29	1
Vissel Kobe	2012	J1 League	21	1	0	0	2	0	23	1
Vissel Kobe	2013	J2 League	17	0	0	0	—		16	0
Vissel Kobe	2014	J1 League	12	0	1	0	4	0	17	0
Fukushima United FC	2015	J3 League	25	3	1	0	—		26	3
Fukushima United FC	2016	J3 League	24	2	2	0	—		26	2
Fukushima United FC	2017	J3 League	26	1	—		—		26	1
Fukushima United FC	2018	J3 League	11	0	—		—		11	0
Career total			346	31	16	4	29	3	391	38
