= Shuhei Otsuki =

Japanese footballer (born 1989)

Shuhei Otsuki 大槻 周平
Personal information
- Full name: Shuhei Otsuki
- Date of birth: May 26, 1989 (age 37)
- Place of birth: Fukuchiyama, Kyoto, Japan
- Height: 1.78 m (5 ft 10 in)
- Position: Forward

Team information
- Current team: Renofa Yamaguchi FC
- Number: 13

Youth career
- 2008–2011: Osaka Gakuin University

Senior career*
Years	Team	Apps	(Gls)
2012–2016	Shonan Bellmare	107	(15)
2017–2018	Vissel Kobe	33	(2)
2019–2020	Montedio Yamagata	79	(19)
2021	JEF United Chiba	14	(0)
2021-	Renofa Yamaguchi	45	(4)
- * Club domestic league appearances and goals as of 17 December 2023

Shuhei Otsuki (大槻 周平, born May 26, 1989) is a Japanese football player for Renofa Yamaguchi FC.

== Career statistics ==
Updated to end of 2018 season.

Appearances and goals by club, season and competition
Club	Season	League			Emperor's Cup		J.League Cup		Total	
Club	Season	Division	Apps	Goals	Apps	Goals	Apps	Goals	Apps	Goals
Shonan Bellmare	2012	J2 League	19	5	2	2	—		21	7
Shonan Bellmare	2013	J1 League	14	0	1	0	3	1	18	1
Shonan Bellmare	2014	J2 League	15	4	0	0	—		15	4
Shonan Bellmare	2015	J1 League	32	4	2	0	3	0	37	4
Shonan Bellmare	2016	J1 League	27	2	2	1	4	1	33	4
Vissel Kobe	2017	J1 League	14	1	5	0	1	1	20	2
Vissel Kobe	2018	J1 League	19	1	3	1	2	1	24	3
Career total			140	17	15	4	13	4	168	25
