= Yuta Goke =

Japanese association football player

Yuta Goke 郷家 友太
Personal information
- Full name: Yuta Goke
- Date of birth: 10 June 1999 (age 27)
- Place of birth: Miyagi, Japan
- Height: 1.83 m (6 ft 0 in)
- Positions: Midfielder; forward

Team information
- Current team: Vissel Kobe
- Number: 5

Youth career
- Tsurugaya SSS
- Vegalta Sendai
- 2015–2017: Aomori Yamada High School

Senior career*
Years	Team	Apps	(Gls)
2018–2022	Vissel Kobe	108	(10)
2023–2025	Vegalta Sendai	114	(25)
2026–	Vissel Kobe	11	(1)

International career
2017	Japan U18	1	(0)
2018	Japan U19	2	(0)
2019	Japan U20	2	(0)
Medal record
Representing Japan
AFC U-19 Championship
Bronze medal – third place	2018
- * Club domestic league appearances and goals as of 16:36, 27 April 2026 (UTC)

Yuta Goke (郷家 友太, Gōke Yūta; born 10 June 1999) is a Japanese footballer who plays as a midfielder or forward for J1 League club Vissel Kobe.

== Career ==
After winning the 2016 National Championship with Aomori Yamada High School, Yuta Goke joined J1 League club Vissel Kobe for 2018 season. He also found his first goal in J. League Cup in April against V-Varen Nagasaki.

From the 2021 season, changed to the uniform number "7" worn by David Villa.

From 2023, he will return to Vegalta Sendai, where he was raised until junior high school.

In 2025, he was named Vegalta Sendai captain.

In December 2025, it was announced Goke would return on a permanent transfer to Vissel Kobe.

== Career statistics ==
As of 27 April 2026.

Appearances and goals by club, season and competition
Club	Season	League			National cup (Note: Includes Emperors Cup)		League cup (Note: Includes J.League Cup)		Continental		Other		Total	
Club	Season	Division	Apps	Goals	Apps	Goals	Apps	Goals	Apps	Goals	Apps	Goals	Apps	Goals
Vissel Kobe	2018	J1 League	22	2	2	0	6	1	0	0	–		30	3
Vissel Kobe	2019	J1 League	12	1	3	0	4	0	0	0	–		19	1
Vissel Kobe	2020	J1 League	24	5	0	0	0	0	6 (Note: Appearances in AFC Champions League Elite)	0	–		30	5
Vissel Kobe	2021	J1 League	32	2	2	0	4	0	0	0	–		38	2
Vissel Kobe	2022	J1 League	18	0	4	0	1	0	6	2	–		29	2
Vissel Kobe	Total		108	10	11	0	15	1	12	2	0	0	146	13
Vegalta Sendai	2023	J2 League	39	10	1	0	0	0	–		0	0	40	10
Vegalta Sendai	2024	J2 League	38	5	0	0	1	1	–		2 (Note: Appearance in J1/J2 play-offs)	1	41	7
Vegalta Sendai	2025	J2 League	37	10	0	0	0	0	–		0	0	37	10
Vegalta Sendai	Total		114	25	1	0	1	1	0	0	2	1	118	27
Vissel Kobe	2026	J1 (100)	11	1	0	0	0	0	6	0	–		17	1
Career total			233	36	12	0	16	2	18	2	2	1	281	41

== Honours ==
Vissel Kobe

- Emperor's Cup: 2019
- J1 100 Year Vision League: 2026
