= Takuya Yasui =

Japanese footballer (born 1998)

Takuya Yasui 安井 拓也
Personal information
- Full name: Takuya Yasui
- Date of birth: November 21, 1998 (age 27)
- Place of birth: Inami, Hyōgo, Japan
- Height: 1.74 m (5 ft 8 1/2 in)
- Position: Midfielder

Team information
- Current team: JEF United Chiba
- Number: 25

Youth career
- Vissel Kobe

Senior career*
Years	Team	Apps	(Gls)
2017–2021	Vissel Kobe	41	(1)
2021–2024	FC Machida Zelvia	77	(2)
2025–	JEF United Chiba	18	(3)
2025	→ FC Imabari (loan)	7	(1)
- * Club domestic league appearances and goals as of 12 August 2026

Takuya Yasui (安井 拓也, Yasui Takuya; born November 21, 1998) is a Japanese football player. He plays for JEF United Chiba.

== Career ==
Takuya Yasui joined J1 League club Vissel Kobe in 2017.

== Club statistics ==
Updated to 23 October 2022.

Club performance			League		Cup		League Cup		Continental		Other		Total	
Season	Club	League	Apps	Goals	Apps	Goals	Apps	Goals	Apps	Goals	Apps	Goals	Apps	Goals
Japan			League		Emperor's Cup		J. League Cup		Asia		Other		Total	
2017	Vissel Kobe	J1 League	1	0	1	0	1	0	-		-		3	0
2018	Vissel Kobe	J1 League	4	0	2	1	4	0	-		-		10	1
2019	Vissel Kobe	J1 League	11	0	5	1	6	0	-		-		22	1
2020	Vissel Kobe	J1 League	20	1	-		1	0	8	0	1	0	30	1
2021	Vissel Kobe	J1 League	5	1	1	0	6	0	-		-		12	1
2021	FC Machida Zelvia	J2 League	16	0	0	0	-		-		-		16	0
2022	FC Machida Zelvia	J2 League	30	0	0	0	-		-		-		30	0
Total			87	1	9	2	18	0	8	0	1	0	123	4

== Honours ==
Vissel Kobe

- Emperor's Cup: 2019
- Japanese Super Cup: 2020
