= Ryosuke Maeda (footballer, born 1994) =

Japanese footballer

Ryosuke Maeda 前田 凌佑
Personal information
- Full name: Ryosuke Maeda
- Date of birth: 27 April 1994 (age 32)
- Place of birth: Himeji, Japan
- Height: 1.72 m (5 ft 7 1/2 in)
- Position: Midfielder

Team information
- Current team: Royal Cambodian Armed Forces
- Number: 31

Youth career
- 2007–2012: Vissel Kobe

Senior career*
Years	Team	Apps	(Gls)
2013–2018	Vissel Kobe	17	(0)
2014–2015	→ J.League U-22 (loan)	15	(2)
2017–2018	→ Oita Trinita (loan)	30	(1)
2019–2021	Oita Trinita	10	(0)
2021–2023	Ehime FC	35	(0)
2024–2025	Young Elephants	6	(1)
2025–	Royal Cambodian Armed Forces	13	(2)
- * Club domestic league appearances and goals as of 11 May 2026

Ryosuke Maeda (前田 凌佑, Maeda Ryosuke; born 27 April 1994) is a Japanese football player for Royal Cambodian Armed Forces in Cambodian Premier League.

== Career statistics ==
Updated to 25 February 2019.

Appearances and goals by club, season and competition
Club	Season	League			Emperor's Cup		J.League Cup		Total	
Club	Season	Division	Apps	Goals	Apps	Goals	Apps	Goals	Apps	Goals
Vissel Kobe	2013	J2 League	0	0	1	0	—		1	0
Vissel Kobe	2014	J1 League	0	0	0	0	0	0	0	0
Vissel Kobe	2015	J1 League	9	0	3	0	7	0	19	0
Vissel Kobe	2016	J1 League	8	0	1	0	2	0	11	0
Oita Trinita	2017	J2 League	15	1	2	0	—		17	1
Oita Trinita	2018	J2 League	15	0	0	0	—		15	0
Career total			47	1	7	0	9	0	63	1
