= Yoshiki Matsushita =

Japanese footballer

Personal information
- Full name: Yoshiki Matsushita
- Date of birth: March 3, 1994 (age 32)
- Place of birth: Matsuyama, Ehime, Japan
- Height: 1.74 m (5 ft 8 1/2 in)
- Positions: Left-back; left midfielder

Team information
- Current team: Tochigi SC
- Number: 18

Youth career
- 2001–2005: Miyamae SC
- 2006–2008: Mitsuhama Junior High School
- 2009–2011: Matsuyama Kogyo High School

College career
Years	Team	Apps	(Gls)
2012–2015	Hannan University		

Senior career*
Years	Team	Apps	(Gls)
2015–2018	Vissel Kobe	46	(1)
2019–2025	Vegalta Sendai	108	(8)
2025–2026	Fujieda MYFC	16	(0)
2026–	Tochigi SC	2	(0)
- * Club domestic league appearances and goals as of 17 August 2026

Yoshiki Matsushita (松下 佳貴, Matsushita Yoshiki; born March 3, 1994) is a Japanese professional footballer who plays as a left-back or left midfielder for Tochigi SC.

== Club statistics ==
Updated to 8 November 2022.

Club	Season	League			National Cup		League Cup		Other		Total	
Club	Season	Division	Apps	Goals	Apps	Goals	Apps	Goals	Apps	Goals	Apps	Goals
Vissel Kobe	2015	J1 League	1	0	0	0	0	0	0	0	1	0
Vissel Kobe	2016	J1 League	11	1	3	0	3	0	0	0	17	1
Vissel Kobe	2017	J1 League	25	0	3	0	6	0	0	0	34	0
Vissel Kobe	2018	J1 League	9	0	1	0	4	0	0	0	14	0
Vissel Kobe	Total		46	1	7	0	13	0	0	0	66	1
Vegalta Sendai	2019	J1 League	25	3	1	0	3	0	0	0	29	3
Vegalta Sendai	2020	J1 League	13	2	-	-	1	0	0	0	14	2
Vegalta Sendai	2021	J1 League	28	2	0	0	4	0	0	0	32	2
Vegalta Sendai	2022	J2 League	5	0	0	0	-	-	0	0	5	0
Career total			117	8	8	0	21	0	0	0	146	8
