= Takuya Iwanami =

Japanese footballer (born 1994)

Takuya Iwanami 岩波 拓也
Personal information
- Full name: Takuya Iwanami
- Date of birth: 18 June 1994 (age 32)
- Place of birth: Kobe, Hyogo, Japan
- Height: 1.86 m (6 ft 1 in)
- Position: Centre back

Team information
- Current team: Vissel Kobe
- Number: 31

Youth career
- 2001–2002: Suma Nice SC
- 2003–2006: Kobe FC
- 2007–2012: Vissel Kobe

Senior career*
Years	Team	Apps	(Gls)
2012–2017	Vissel Kobe	143	(6)
2015	→ J. League U-22 (loan)	1	(0)
2018–2023	Urawa Red Diamonds	146	(7)
2024–	Vissel Kobe	9	(0)

International career
2011	Japan U-17	4	(0)
2012	Japan U-19	3	(1)
Medal record
Urawa Reds
Winner	Emperor's Cup	2018
Representing Japan
AFC U-23 Championship
Gold medal – first place	2016 Qatar
- * Club domestic league appearances and goals as of 10 August 2026

Takuya Iwanami (岩波 拓也, Iwanami Takuya; born 18 June 1994 in Kobe, Hyogo) is a Japanese professional footballer who plays as a centre back for J1 League club Vissel Kobe.

== National team career ==
In June 2011, Iwanami was elected for the Japan U-17 national team for the 2011 U-17 World Cup and he played four matches as captain. In August 2016, he was elected to the Japan U-23 national team for the 2016 Summer Olympics, but he did not play.

== Career statistics ==
=== Club ===
As of 14 April 2024.

Appearances and goals by club, season and competition
Club	Season	League			National Cup		League Cup		Continental		Other		Total	
Club	Season	Division	Apps	Goals	Apps	Goals	Apps	Goals	Apps	Goals	Apps	Goals	Apps	Goals
Japan			League		Emperor's Cup		J.League Cup		AFC		Other		Total	
Vissel Kobe	2012	J1 League	2	0	0	0	0	0	-		-		2	0
Vissel Kobe	2013	J2 League	37	2	1	0	-		-		-		38	2
Vissel Kobe	2014	J1 League	24	1	1	0	6	1	-		-		31	2
Vissel Kobe	2015	J1 League	30	1	4	1	8	1	-		-		42	3
Vissel Kobe	2016	J1 League	21	1	3	0	3	0	-		-		27	1
Vissel Kobe	2017	J1 League	29	1	3	0	5	0	-		-		37	1
Vissel Kobe	Total		143	6	12	1	22	2	0	0	0	0	177	9
J.League U-22 Selection (loan)	2015	J3 League	1	0	0	0	-		-		-		1	0
Urawa Red Diamonds	2018	J1 League	22	2	5	0	8	0	-		-		35	2
Urawa Red Diamonds	2019	J1 League	25	1	2	0	1	0	12	0	1 (Note: Appearances in the Japanese Super Cup)	0	41	1
Urawa Red Diamonds	2020	J1 League	23	0	0	0	2	0	-		-		25	0
Urawa Red Diamonds	2021	J1 League	37	1	6	1	11	0	-		-		54	2
Urawa Red Diamonds	2022	J1 League	31	3	2	0	4	0	8	1	1	0	46	4
Urawa Red Diamonds	2023	J1 League	8	0	2	0	7	0	5	0	0	0	22	0
Urawa Red Diamonds	Total		146	7	17	1	33	0	25	1	2	0	223	9
Vissel Kobe	2024	J1 League	1	0	0	0	1	0	0	0	-		2	0
Career total			291	13	29	2	56	2	25	1	2	0	403	18

== Honours ==
=== Club ===
Urawa Red Diamonds

- Emperor's Cup: 2018, 2021
- Japanese Super Cup: 2022
- AFC Champions League: 2022

Vissel Kobe

- J1 League: 2024
- J1 100 Year Vision League: 2026
