= Hiroki Kishida =

Japanese footballer

Hiroki Kishida 岸田 裕樹
Personal information
- Full name: Hiroki Kishida
- Date of birth: June 7, 1981 (age 45)
- Place of birth: Itami, Hyogo, Japan
- Height: 1.69 m (5 ft 6 1/2 in)
- Position: Forward

Youth career
- 1997–1999: Kwansei Gakuin High School
- 2000–2003: Kwansei Gakuin University

Senior career*
Years	Team	Apps	(Gls)
2004	Vissel Kobe	0	(0)
2005–2006	YKK AP	59	(33)
2007–2009	Vissel Kobe	21	(0)
2010–2011	Fagiano Okayama	63	(8)
Total		143	(41)
- * Club domestic league appearances and goals

Hiroki Kishida (岸田 裕樹, Kishida Hiroki; born June 7, 1981) is a former Japanese football player.

== Career statistics ==
Appearances and goals by club, season and competition
Club	Season	League			Emperor's Cup		J.League Cup		Total	
Club	Season	Division	Apps	Goals	Apps	Goals	Apps	Goals	Apps	Goals
Vissel Kobe	2004	J1 League	0	0	0	0	1	0	1	0
YKK AP	2005	Football League	28	13	0	0	—		28	13
YKK AP	2006	Football League	31	20	3	2	—		34	22
Vissel Kobe	2007	J1 League	5	0	0	0	4	0	9	0
Vissel Kobe	2008	J1 League	9	0	1	0	3	0	13	0
Vissel Kobe	2009	J1 League	7	0	2	0	0	0	9	0
Fagiano Okayama	2010	J2 League								
Career total			80	33	6	2	8	0	94	35
