= Shunki Takahashi =

Japanese footballer

Personal information
- Full name: Shunki Takahashi
- Date of birth: 4 May 1990 (age 36)
- Place of birth: Asaka, Saitama, Japan
- Height: 1.69 m (5 ft 7 in)
- Position: Right back

Team information
- Current team: Iwate Grulla Morioka
- Number: 6

Youth career
- 2003–2008: Urawa Red Diamonds Youth

Senior career*
Years	Team	Apps	(Gls)
2009–2012	Urawa Red Diamonds	53	(1)
2012–2013	JEF United Chiba	50	(1)
2014–2018	Vissel Kobe	116	(6)
2019–2021	Kashiwa Reysol	48	(0)
2022–2023	V-Varen Nagasaki	6	(0)
2024–	Iwate Grulla Morioka	0	(0)

International career^{‡}
2006–2007	Japan U17	7	(0)
2009	Japan U20	1	(0)
2011	Japan U22	3	(0)
Medal record
Urawa Red Diamonds
Runner-up	J.League Cup	2011
Representing Japan
AFC U-16 Championship
Gold medal – first place	2006 Singapore
- * Club domestic league appearances and goals as of 30 August 2022 ‡ National team caps and goals as of 10 August 2011

Shunki Takahashi (高橋 峻希, Takahashi Shunki; born 4 May 1990) is a Japanese football player currently playing for Iwate Grulla Morioka.

== National team career ==
In August 2007, Takahashi was elected Japan U-17 national team for 2007 U-17 World Cup. He played full time in all 3 matches as right side-back.

== Club statistics ==
Updated to end of 2018 season.

Club	Season	League		Cup		League Cup		AFC		Total	
Club	Season	Apps	Goals	Apps	Goals	Apps	Goals	Apps	Goals	Apps	Goals
Urawa Red Diamonds	2008	0	0	0	0	3	0	0	0	3	0
Urawa Red Diamonds	2009	12	1	0	0	5	0	–		17	1
Urawa Red Diamonds	2010	14	0	4	0	2	0	–		20	0
Urawa Red Diamonds	2011	27	0	1	0	4	0	–		32	0
Urawa Red Diamonds	2012	0	0	0	0	5	1	–		5	1
JEF United Chiba	2012	16	0	2	0	–		–		18	0
JEF United Chiba	2013	34	1	1	1	–		–		35	2
Vissel Kobe	2014	28	1	1	0	5	0	–		34	1
Vissel Kobe	2015	27	4	3	0	10	0	–		40	4
Vissel Kobe	2016	34	1	3	0	6	1	–		43	2
Vissel Kobe	2017	17	0	1	0	2	0	–		20	0
Vissel Kobe	2018	10	0	2	0	4	0	–		16	0
Career total		219	8	18	1	46	2	0	0	283	11

== National team statistics ==
As of 10 August 2011

National team	Year	Apps	Goals
Japan U17
Japan U17	2006	4	0
Japan U17	2007	3	0
Japan U17	Total	7	0
Japan U20
Japan U20	2009	1	0
Japan U20	Total	1	0
Japan U22
Japan U22	2011	3	0
Japan U22	Total	3	0

International appearances and goals
#	Date	Venue	Opponent	Result	Goal	Competition
2006
	3 September	Jalan Besar Stadium, Jalan Besar	Nepal U16	6–0	0	2006 AFC U-17 Championship / Japan U16
	7 September	Jalan Besar Stadium, Jalan Besar	South Korea U16	3–2	0	2006 AFC U-17 Championship / Japan U16
	11 September	Jalan Besar Stadium, Jalan Besar	Iran U16	1–1	0	2006 AFC U-17 Championship / Japan U16
	17 September	Jalan Besar Stadium, Jalan Besar	North Korea U16	4–2	0	2006 AFC U-17 Championship / Japan U16
2007
	19 August	Gwangyang Football Stadium, Gwangyang	Haiti U17	3–1	0	2007 FIFA U-17 World Cup / Japan U17
	22 August	Gwangyang Football Stadium, Gwangyang	Nigeria U17	0–3	0	2007 FIFA U-17 World Cup / Japan U17
	25 August	Goyang Stadium, Goyang	France U17	1–2	0	2007 FIFA U-17 World Cup / Japan U17
2009
	19 December	Changwon Football Center, Changwon	South Korea U20	2–1	0	Friendly / Japan U20
2011
	9 February	Mohammed Al-Hamad Stadium, Hawalli	Kuwait	0–3	0	Friendly / Japan U22
	12 February	Bahrain National Stadium, Manama	Bahrain U22	2–0	0	Friendly / Japan U22
	10 August	Sapporo Dome, Sapporo	Egypt U22	2–1	0	Friendly / Japan U22

== Awards and honours ==
=== Japan ===
- AFC U-17 Championship : 2006
