= Kenshin Yoshimaru =

Japanese footballer

Kenshin Yoshimaru 吉丸 絢梓
Personal information
- Full name: Kenshin Yoshimaru
- Date of birth: March 27, 1996 (age 30)
- Place of birth: Miyakonojō, Japan
- Height: 1.84 m (6 ft 1/2 in)
- Position: Goalkeeper

Team information
- Current team: Fukushima United FC
- Number: 22

Youth career
- 2011–2013: Vissel Kobe

Senior career*
Years	Team	Apps	(Gls)
2014–2021	Vissel Kobe	3	(0)
2014–2015	→ J. League U-22 (loan)	15	(0)
2016	→ Oita Trinita (loan)	0	(0)
2018	→ Tokushima Vortis (loan)	0	(0)
2021–2023	Giravanz Kitakyushu	37	(0)
2024–	Fukushima United	54	(0)
- * Club domestic league appearances and goals as of 25 August 2026

Kenshin Yoshimaru (吉丸 絢梓, Yoshimaru Kenshin; born March 27, 1996) is a Japanese football player currently playing for Fukushima United.

== Career statistics ==
Updated to 14 October 2020.

Appearances and goals by club, season and competition
Club	Season	League			Emperor's Cup		J.League Cup		Asia		Total	
Club	Season	Division	Apps	Goals	Apps	Goals	Apps	Goals	Apps	Goals	Apps	Goals
Vissel Kobe	2014	J1 League	0	0	0	0	0	0	-		0	0
Vissel Kobe	2015	J1 League	0	0	0	0	0	0	-		0	0
Oita Trinita	2016	J3 League	0	0	0	0	–		-		0	0
Vissel Kobe	2017	J1 League	0	0	0	0	0	0	-		0	0
Tokushima Vortis	2018	J2 League	0	0	0	0	-		-		0	0
Vissel Kobe	2018	J1 League	0	0	0	0	1	0	-		1	0
Vissel Kobe	2019	J1 League	2	0	0	0	1	0	-		3	0
Vissel Kobe	2020	J1 League	1	0	-		0	0	0	0	1	0
Career total			3	0	0	0	2	0	0	0	5	0
