= Raphael Botti =

Brazilian footballer (born 1981)

Botti
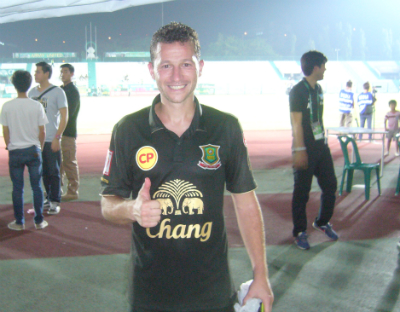

Personal information
- Full name: Raphael José Botti Zacarias Sena
- Date of birth: 23 February 1981 (age 45)
- Place of birth: Juiz de Fora, Minas Gerais, Brazil
- Height: 1.71 m (5 ft 7 1/2 in)
- Position: Midfielder

Youth career
- 1994–2000: Vasco da Gama

Senior career*
Years	Team	Apps	(Gls)
2001	Vasco da Gama	20	(1)
2002–2006	Jeonbuk Hyundai	155	(32)
2007–2011	Vissel Kobe	141	(18)
2012–2014	Figueirense	22	(8)
2014–2016	Army United	50	(22)
- * Club domestic league appearances and goals as of 12 June 2016

Raphael José Botti (born 23 February 1981), commonly known as Botti, is a former Brazilian professional footballer.

Botti started his professional football career with Vasco da Gama and then joined Jeonbuk Hyundai Motors (2002~06). Botti had saved his best performances for the 2006 AFC Champions League and scored an important goal at the 1st leg of the final. However, Botti then transferred to Vissel Kobe after the 2006 FIFA Club World Cup.

== Club statistics ==
Club performance			League		Cup		League Cup		Total	
Season	Club	League	Apps	Goals	Apps	Goals	Apps	Goals	Apps	Goals
Brazil			League		Copa do Brasil		League Cup		Total	
2001	Vasco da Gama	Série A	20	1					20	1
Korea Republic			League		FA Cup		K-League Cup		Total	
2002	Jeonbuk Hyundai Motors	K-League	16	0					16	0
2003	Jeonbuk Hyundai Motors	K-League	29	5					29	5
2004	Jeonbuk Hyundai Motors	K-League	15	2					15	12
2005	Jeonbuk Hyundai Motors	K-League	20	1					20	3
2006	Jeonbuk Hyundai Motors	K-League	21	3					21	6
Japan			League		Emperor's Cup		J.League Cup		Total	
2007	Vissel Kobe	J1 League	31	1	1	0	5	1	37	2
2008	Vissel Kobe	J1 League	30	3	1	0	1	0	32	3
2009	Vissel Kobe	J1 League	26	0	3	1	0	0	29	1
2010	Vissel Kobe	J1 League								
Country	Brazil		20	1					20	1
Country	Korea Republic		101	11					101	26
Country	Japan		87	4	5	1	6	1	98	6
Total			208	16	5	1	6	1	219	33

== Honours ==
- AFC Champions League 2006 Champions
