= Asahi Masuyama =

Japanese footballer (born 1997)

Asahi Masuyama 増山 朝陽
Personal information
- Full name: Asahi Masuyama
- Date of birth: January 29, 1997 (age 29)
- Place of birth: Fukuoka, Japan
- Height: 1.73 m (5 ft 8 in)
- Position: Midfielder

Team information
- Current team: V-Varen Nagasaki (on loan from FC Machida Zelvia)
- Number: 88

Youth career
- Itazuke Wing SC
- 2009–2011: Itazuke Junior High School
- 2012–2014: Higashi Fukuoka High School

Senior career*
Years	Team	Apps	(Gls)
2015–2021	Vissel Kobe	45	(3)
2017	→ Yokohama FC (loan)	9	(0)
2020	→ Avispa Fukuoka (loan)	36	(5)
2021-2022	Oita Trinita	35	(2)
2023-2025	V-Varen Nagasaki	98	(11)
2025-	FC Machida Zelvia	12	(0)
2026–	→ V-Varen Nagasaki (loan)	1	(0)
- * Club domestic league appearances and goals as of 15:45, 6 October 2026 (UTC)

Asahi Masuyama (増山 朝陽, Masuyama Asahi; born January 29, 1997 in Fukuoka) is a Japanese footballer who plays as a midfielder for J1 League club V-Varen Nagasaki, on loan from FC Machida Zelvia.

== Biography ==
Masuyama was born on January 29, 1997, in Fukuoka City's Hakata Ward, Fukuoka Prefecture, to a Japanese father and a Spanish-Filipino mother.

== Career ==
Masuyama joined J1 League club Vissel Kobe in 2015.

== Club statistics ==
As of 6 October 2026.

Appearances and goals by club, season and competition
Club	Season	League			National cup (Note: Includes Emperor's Cup)		League cup (Note: Includes J.League Cup)		Continental		Other		Total	
Club	Season	Division	Apps	Goals	Apps	Goals	Apps	Goals	Apps	Goals	Apps	Goals	Apps	Goals
Vissel Kobe	2015	J1 League	9	0	3	1	4	0	–		–		16	1
Vissel Kobe	2016	J1 League	8	1	3	1	3	0	–		–		14	2
Vissel Kobe	2018	J1 League	7	1	0	0	5	1	–		–		12	2
Vissel Kobe	2019	J1 League	4	1	1	0	3	0	–		–		8	1
Vissel Kobe	2021	J1 League	17	0	2	0	6	1	–		–		25	1
Vissel Kobe	Total		45	3	9	2	21	2	0	0	0	0	75	7
Yokohama FC (loan)	2017	J2 League	9	0	1	0	–		–		–		10	0
Avispa Fukuoka (loan)	2020	J2 League	36	5	–		–		–		–		36	5
Oita Trinita	2021	J1 League	12	1	0	0	0	0	–		0	0	12	1
Oita Trinita	2022	J2 League	23	1	1	0	2	0	–		1 (Note: Appearance in J1/J2 play-offs)	0	27	1
Oita Trinita	Total		35	2	1	0	2	0	0	0	1	0	39	2
V-Varen Nagasaki	2023	J2 League	38	3	0	0	0	0	–		0	0	38	3
V-Varen Nagasaki	2024	J2 League	38	4	0	0	4	0	–		1	0	43	4
V-Varen Nagasaki	2025	J2 League	22	4	0	0	2	1	–		0	0	24	5
V-Varen Nagasaki	Total		98	11	0	0	6	1	0	0	1	0	105	12
Machida Zelvia	2025	J1 League	5	0	3	1	–		6 (Note: Appearances in AFC Champions League Elite)	1	–		14	2
Machida Zelvia	2026	J1 (100)	7	0	–		–		0	0	–		7	0
Machida Zelvia	2026–27	J1 League	0	0	1	0	–		0	0	–		1	0
Machida Zelvia	Total		12	0	4	1	0	0	6	1	0	0	22	2
V-Varen Nagasaki (loan)	2026–27	J1 League	1	0	0	0	1	0	–		0	0	2	0
Career total			236	21	15	3	30	3	6	1	2	0	289	28

== Honours ==
Vissel Kobe

- Emperor's Cup: 2019

Machida Zelvia

- Emperor's Cup: 2025
