= 2012 Vissel Kobe season =

Vissel Kobe
2012 season
- Chairman: Koichi Kanaya
- Manager: Masahiro Wada
- J. League Division 1: –
- Emperor's Cup: –
- J. League Cup: –
Home colours	Away colours

The 2012 Vissel Kobe season was Vissel Kobe's sixth consecutive season and 15th overall in J. League Division 1. Vissel Kobe are also competing in the 2012 Emperor's Cup and 2012 J. League Cup.

As of 2011, Kobe is the only top division club to never win any major honour (their promotions have always been as runners-up or below, and they have never won the Emperor's Cup, J. League Cup or Shakaijin Cup).

== Competitions ==
=== J. League ===
==== League table ====
Pos	Team	Pld	W	D	L	GF	GA	GD	Pts	Qualification or relegation
1	Sanfrecce Hiroshima (C)	34	19	7	8	63	34	+29	64	Qualification to 2012 Club World Cup and 2013 Champions League
2	Vegalta Sendai	34	15	12	7	59	43	+16	57	Qualification to 2013 Champions League (Note: The winners of the 2012 Emperor's Cup qualified for the group stage of the 2013 AFC Champions League.)
3	Urawa Red Diamonds	34	15	10	9	47	42	+5	55	Qualification to 2013 Champions League
4	Yokohama F. Marinos	34	13	14	7	44	33	+11	53	
5	Sagan Tosu	34	15	8	11	48	39	+9	53	
6	Kashiwa Reysol	34	15	7	12	57	52	+5	52	Qualification to 2013 Champions League
7	Nagoya Grampus	34	15	7	12	46	47	−1	52	
8	Kawasaki Frontale	34	14	8	12	51	50	+1	50	
9	Shimizu S-Pulse	34	14	7	13	39	40	−1	49	
10	FC Tokyo	34	14	6	14	47	44	+3	48	
11	Kashima Antlers	34	12	10	12	50	43	+7	46	
12	Júbilo Iwata	34	13	7	14	57	53	+4	46	
13	Omiya Ardija	34	11	11	12	38	45	−7	44	
14	Cerezo Osaka	34	11	9	14	47	53	−6	42	
15	Albirex Niigata	34	10	10	14	29	34	−5	40	
16	Vissel Kobe (R)	34	11	6	17	41	50	−9	39	Relegation to 2013 J.League Division 2
17	Gamba Osaka (R)	34	9	11	14	67	65	+2	38	Relegation to 2013 J.League Division 2
18	Consadole Sapporo (R)	34	4	2	28	25	88	−63	14	Relegation to 2013 J.League Division 2

Updated to match(es) played on 1 December 2012. Source: J.League Division 1
Rules for classification: 1) points; 2) goal difference; 3) number of goals scored.
(C) Champions; (R) Relegated

==== Matches ====
10 March 2012 1	Gamba Osaka	2–3	Vissel Kobe	Expo '70 Commemorative Stadium
Saturday 14:04	Paulinho 34'; Rafinha 90+2'	Report	17', 76' Okubo; 59' Hashimoto	Attendance: 17,066; Referee: Takayama

17 March 2012 2	Vissel Kobe	2–1	Consadole Sapporo	HOME'S Stadium Kobe
Saturday 17:06	Kondo 22'; Tokura 83'	Report	7' Yamamoto	Attendance: 14,036; Referee: Iida

24 March 2012 3	Vissel Kobe	0–2	F.C. Tokyo	HOME'S Stadium Kobe
Saturday 14:04		Report	32' Ishikawa; 90+6' Watanabe	Attendance: 11,839; Referee: Yamamoto

31 March 2012 4	Sagan Tosu	3–0	Vissel Kobe	Best Amenity Stadium
Saturday 19:04	Noda 28'; Toyoda 43'; Ikeda 90+5'	Report		Attendance: 7,719; Referee: Matsumura

7 April 2012 5	Vissel Kobe	0–1	Shimizu S-Pulse	HOME'S Stadium Kobe
15:00	Takagi (yellow card) 90+1'	Report	Iwashita (yellow card) 30'; Brosque 82'	Attendance: 12,709; Referee: Itaru Hirose

14 April 2012 6	Urawa Red Diamonds	2–0	Vissel Kobe	Saitama Stadium 2002
16:00	Abe 53'; Marcio Richardes 77'	Report	Ōkubo (yellow card) 27'; Okui (yellow card) 42'	Attendance: 25,894; Referee: Hiroyoshi Takayama

21 April 2012 7	Vissel Kobe	3–1	Kashiwa Reysol	HOME'S Stadium Kobe
15:00	Nozawa 14'; Takagi (yellow card) 35'; Ōkubo (yellow card) 64'; Okui (yellow card) 78'; Ogawa 85'; Tashiro 90+1'	Summary	Sawa (yellow card) 30' (goal) 41'	Attendance: 10,859; Referee: Ryuji Sato

=== J. League Cup ===
20 March 2012 Group B	Kashima Antlers	2–0	Vissel Kobe	Kashima Soccer Stadium
Tuesday 15:00	Osako 20'; Endo 45+1'	Report		Attendance: 11,379; Referee: Matsuo

=== Emperor's Cup ===
8 September 2012 Round 2	Vissel Kobe	1–2	Sagawa Shiga	Himeji
13:00	Lee Kwang-Seon 42'	Report	Shimada 11'; Shohei Kiyohara 55'	Stadium: Himeji Athletic Stadium; Attendance: 4,102; Referee: Yudai Yamamoto
