= Leandro (footballer, born February 1985) =

Brazilian footballer

Leandro Montera
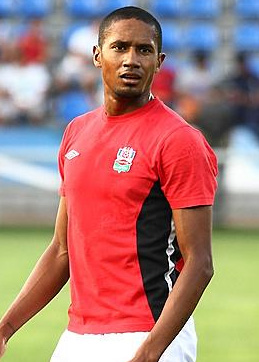

Personal information
- Full name: Leandro Montera da Silva
- Date of birth: 12 February 1985 (age 41)
- Place of birth: São Paulo, Brazil
- Height: 1.76 m (5 ft 9 in)
- Position: Striker

Youth career
- 1993–1999: Corinthians
- 2000–2004: Nacional (SP)

Senior career*
Years	Team	Apps	(Gls)
2005	Nacional (SP)	0	(0)
2005	→ São Paulo (loan)	0	(0)
2005	→ Omiya Ardija (loan)	7	(1)
2006	→ Montedio Yamagata (loan)	40	(23)
2007–2008	Vissel Kobe	57	(22)
2009	Gamba Osaka	21	(11)
2009–2014	Al-Sadd	28	(23)
2012	→ Al-Rayyan (loan)	4	(4)
2012–2013	→ Gamba Osaka (loan)	34	(27)
2014–2015	Kashiwa Reysol	42	(16)
2015–2018	Vissel Kobe	46	(24)
2018–2020	Tokyo Verdy	36	(8)
2021	Nacional (SP)	6	(2)
- * Club domestic league appearances and goals

Leandro Montera da Silva, or simply Leandro (born 12 February 1985), is a Brazilian former professional footballer who played as a striker.

== Career ==
Leandro also played for Rio Branco (SP). In August 2009, he joined Qatari outfit Al-Sadd Sports Club for €7 million. On 1 February 2012, he moved to league rivals Al Rayyan Sports Club on loan from Al-Sadd. He played four matches with Al-Rayyan and scored four goals. In June 2012, he was loaned to Gamba Osaka, where he played during the 2009 season, then played for Gamba until June 2013.

== Career statistics ==
Appearances and goals by club, season and competition
Club	Season	League			National cup (Note: Includes Emperor's Cup, Emir of Qatar Cup.)		League cup (Note: Includes J. League Cup, Sheikh Jassem Cup.)		Continental		Total	
Club	Season	Division	Apps	Goals	Apps	Goals	Apps	Goals	Apps	Goals	Apps	Goals
Omiya Ardija	2005	J1 League	7	1	1	0	0	0	–		8	1
Montedio Yamagata	2006	J2 League	40	23	2	4	–		–		42	27
Vissel Kobe	2007	J1 League	32	15	0	0	3	2	–		35	17
Vissel Kobe	2008	J1 League	25	7	1	2	4	1	–		30	10
Vissel Kobe	Total		57	22	1	2	7	3	0	0	65	27
Gamba Osaka	2009	J1 League	21	11	0	0	2	1	6	10	29	22
Al-Sadd	2009–10	Qatar Stars League	20	20	2	0	4	9	6	5	32	34
Al-Sadd	2010–11	Qatar Stars League	8	3	0	0	0	0	6	0	14	3
Al-Sadd	Qatar		28	23	2	0	4	9	12	5	46	37
Al-Rayyan	2011–12	Qatar Stars League	4	4	0	0	0	0	5	1	9	5
Gamba Osaka	2012	J1 League	15	14	0	0	2	0	5	1	22	15
Gamba Osaka	2013	J2 League	19	13	0	0	0	0	0	0	19	13
Gamba Osaka	Total		34	27	0	0	2	0	5	1	41	28
Al-Sadd	2013–14	Qatar Stars League	7	3	0	0	0	0	–		7	3
Kashiwa Reysol	2014	J1 League	28	11	2	1	10	6	1	1	41	19
Kashiwa Reysol	2015	J1 League	14	5	0	0	0	0	6	5	20	10
Kashiwa Reysol	Total		42	16	2	1	10	6	7	6	61	29
Vissel Kobe	2015	J1 League	12	4	2	0	3	1	–		17	5
Vissel Kobe	2016	J1 League	31	19	1	0	5	2	–		37	21
Vissel Kobe	2017	J1 League	1	0	0	0	0	0	–		1	0
Vissel Kobe	2018	J1 League	2	0	0	0	1	1	–		3	1
Vissel Kobe	Total		46	23	3	0	9	4	0	0	58	27
Tokyo Verdy	2018	J2 League	11	1	0	0	–		–		11	1
Tokyo Verdy	2019	J2 League	25	7	0	0	0	0	–		25	7
Tokyo Verdy	2020	J2 League	1	0	0	0	0	0	–		1	0
Tokyo Verdy	Total		37	8	0	0	0	0	0	0	37	8
Nacional Atlético Clube (SP)	2021	Campeonato Paulista Série A3	6	2	0	0	0	0	–		6	2
Total			329	153	11	7	34	23	35	23	402	216

== Honours ==
Individual

- AFC Champions League Top Scorers: 2009
- J. League Division 1 Top Scorer: 2016
- J. League Best Eleven: 2016
