= Masatoshi Mihara =

Japanese footballer

Masatoshi Mihara 三原 雅俊
Personal information
- Full name: Masatoshi Mihara
- Date of birth: August 2, 1988 (age 38)
- Place of birth: Kumamoto, Japan
- Height: 1.75 m (5 ft 9 in)
- Position: Defensive midfielder

Team information
- Current team: Kashiwa Reysol
- Number: 27

Youth career
- 2004–2006: Luther Gakuin High School

Senior career*
Years	Team	Apps	(Gls)
2006	Sagan Tosu	2	(0)
2007–2019	Vissel Kobe	151	(6)
2009	→ Zweigen Kanazawa (loan)	4	(1)
2014	→ V-Varen Nagasaki (loan)	35	(0)
2019	→ Kashiwa Reysol (loan)	16	(2)
2020–2023	Kashiwa Reysol	52	(1)
2024–	Shibuya City		(0)
- * Club domestic league appearances and goals as of 14:26, 19 April 2024 (UTC)

Masatoshi Mihara (三原 雅俊, Mihara Masatoshi; born August 2, 1988 in Kumamoto) is a Japanese football player currently playing for Shibuya City.

== Career statistics ==
Updated to 19 February 2019.

Appearances and goals by club, season and competition
Club	Season	League			Emperor's Cup		J.League Cup		Total	
Club	Season	Division	Apps	Goals	Apps	Goals	Apps	Goals	Apps	Goals
Sagan Tosu	2006	J2 League	2	0	0	0	—		2	0
Vissel Kobe	2007	J1 League	0	0	0	0	0	0	0	0
Vissel Kobe	2008	J1 League	0	0	0	0	1	0	1	0
Vissel Kobe	2009	J1 League	0	0	0	0	0	0	0	0
Zweigen Kanazawa	2009	JRL	4	1	1	0	—		5	1
Vissel Kobe	2010	J1 League	23	1	1	0	2	0	26	1
Vissel Kobe	2011	J1 League	18	0	1	0	0	0	19	0
Vissel Kobe	2012	J1 League	12	0	1	0	4	0	17	0
Vissel Kobe	2013	J2 League	1	0	1	0	—		2	0
V-Varen Nagasaki	2014	J2 League	35	0	2	0	—		37	0
Vissel Kobe	2015	J1 League	20	1	3	0	6	0	29	1
Vissel Kobe	2016	J1 League	30	0	2	0	6	0	38	0
Vissel Kobe	2017	J1 League	20	2	2	0	7	0	29	2
Vissel Kobe	2018	J1 League	23	2	2	1	5	0	30	3
Career total			188	7	16	1	31	0	235	8
