= 2020 Vissel Kobe season =

Vissel Kobe
2020 season
- Chairman: Katsuhiro Shimizu
- Manager: Thorsten Fink (until 22 September 2020); Atsuhiro Miura (from 24 September 2020)
- Ground: Noevir Stadium Kobe; Kobe, Japan (Capacity: 30,134)
- J1 League: 14th
- J. League Cup: Quarter-finals
- Japanese Super Cup: Winners
- AFC Champions League: Semi-finals
- Top goalscorer: League: Kyogo Furuhashi (12); All: Kyogo Furuhashi (17)
- Highest home attendance: 25,059 (vs. Yokohama, 23 February 2020, J1 League)
- Average home league attendance: 5,476
Home colours	Away colours

The 2020 Vissel Kobe season was Vissel Kobe's seventh consecutive season in the J1 League following promotion to the top flight in 2013 and their 22nd J1 League season overall. The club also took part in the J. League Cup, the 2020 Japanese Super Cup, and the 2020 AFC Champions League. The club secured their first ever appearances in the latter two competition as winners of the 2019 Emperor's Cup.

== Squad ==
As of 13 April 2020

Note: Flags indicate national team as defined under FIFA eligibility rules; some limited exceptions apply. Players may hold more than one non-FIFA nationality.

No.	Pos.	Nation	Player
1	GK	JPN	Daiya Maekawa
3	DF	JPN	Hirofumi Watanabe
4	DF	BEL	Thomas Vermaelen
5	MF	JPN	Hotaru Yamaguchi (vice-captain)
6	MF	ESP	Sergi Samper
8	MF	ESP	Andrés Iniesta (captain)
9	FW	JPN	Noriaki Fujimoto
11	FW	JPN	Kyogo Furuhashi
13	FW	JPN	Keijiro Ogawa
14	MF	JPN	Takuya Yasui
17	DF	JPN	Ryuho Kikuchi
18	GK	JPN	Hiroki Iikura
19	DF	JPN	Ryo Hatsuse
21	FW	JPN	Junya Tanaka

No.	Pos.	Nation	Player
22	DF	JPN	Daigo Nishi (vice-captain)
23	DF	JPN	Tetsushi Yamakawa
24	DF	JPN	Gōtoku Sakai
25	DF	JPN	Leo Osaki
27	MF	JPN	Yuta Goke
28	GK	JPN	Kenshin Yoshimaru
30	GK	JPN	Genta Ito
31	MF	JPN	Yuya Nakasaka
33	DF	BRA	Dankler
38	MF	JPN	Daiju Sasaki
41	FW	JPN	Yutaro Oda
44	DF	JPN	So Fujitani
49	FW	BRA	Douglas

=== Out on loan ===
Note: Flags indicate national team as defined under FIFA eligibility rules; some limited exceptions apply. Players may hold more than one non-FIFA nationality.

No.	Pos.	Nation	Player
—	DF	JPN	Yuki Kobayashi (at Yokohama FC)
—	FW	JPN	Asahi Masuyama (at Avispa Fukuoka)

== Competitions ==
=== J. League ===
==== Table ====
Pos	Team	Pld	W	D	L	GF	GA	GD	Pts
12	Hokkaido Consadole Sapporo	34	10	9	15	47	58	−11	39
13	Sagan Tosu	34	7	15	12	37	43	−6	36
14	Vissel Kobe	34	9	9	16	50	59	−9	36
15	Yokohama FC	34	9	6	19	38	60	−22	33
16	Shimizu S-Pulse	34	7	7	20	48	70	−22	28

Source: J.League Data Site
Rules for classification: 1) Points; 2) Goal difference; 3) Head-to-head points; 4) Head-to-head goal difference; 5) Head-to-head goal scored; 6) Number of wins; 7) Goals scored; 8) Fair-play points.

==== Results summary ====
Overall								Home						Away					
Pld	W	D	L	GF	GA	GD	Pts	W	D	L	GF	GA	GD	W	D	L	GF	GA	GD
33	9	9	15	50	58	−8	36	4	5	8	25	30	−5	5	4	7	25	28	−3

Last updated: 18 November 2020.
Source: Meiji Yasuda J1 League

==== Results by matchday ====
Round	1	2	3	4	5	6	7	8	9	10	11	12	13	14	15	16	17	18	19	20	21	22	23	24	25	26	27	28	29	30	31	32	33	34
Ground	H	H	A	A	H	A	H	A	H	A	H	A	H	A	A	H	A	H	H	A	A	H	A	H	H	A	H	A	H	A	H	A	H	A
Result	D	L	W	D	W	D	L	W	L	D	L	W	D	D	L	D	L	W	W	W	L	D	L	D	L	L	L	L	W	W	L	L	L	L
Position	9	15	13	12	8	9	9	9	10	10	10	9	9	11	10	11	11	11	11	11	10	10	9	9	10	11	11	11	11	12	11	11	12	14

Updated to match(es) played on 19 December 2020. Source: Meiji Yasuda J1 League
A = Away; H = Home; W = Win; D = Draw; L = Loss

==== Matches ====
23 February 2020 1	Vissel Kobe	1–1	Yokohama	Hyōgo-ku, Kobe
16:03 JST	Furuhashi 74'	Report	Seko 24'; Maguinho (yellow card) 54'	Stadium: Noevir Stadium Kobe; Attendance: 25,059; Referee: Yuichi Nishimura

4 July 2020 2	Vissel Kobe	0–3	Sanfrecce Hiroshima	Hyōgo-ku, Kobe
19:33 JST	Watanabe (yellow card) 41'	Report	Nogami (yellow card) 31'; Pereira 35', 81'; Asano 48'; Morishima (yellow card) 67'	Stadium: Noevir Stadium Kobe; Attendance: 0 (Note: Match played behind closed doors); Referee: Yudai Yamamoto

8 July 2020 3	Sagan Tosu	0–1	Vissel Kobe	Tosu, Saga
19:00 JST	Matsuoka (yellow card) 8'	Report	Douglas 75'	Stadium: Ekimae Real Estate Stadium; Attendance: 0 Referee: Hiroki Kasahara

11 July 2020 4	Oita Trinita	1–1	Vissel Kobe	Ōita
19:00 JST	Iwata 29'	Report	Furuhashi 1'	Stadium: Showa Denko Dome Oita; Attendance: 4,263; Referee: Yoshiro Imamura

18 July 2020 5	Vissel Kobe	3–1	Shimizu S-Pulse	Hyōgo-ku, Kobe
19:00 JST	Douglas (yellow card) 20' (goal) 54'; Furuhashi 45+2', 65'	Report	Nishizawa 75'; Nakamura (yellow card) 77'; Okazaki (yellow card) 88'	Stadium: Noevir Stadium Kobe; Attendance: 3,494; Referee: Koei Koya

22 July 2020 6	Cerezo Osaka	0–0	Vissel Kobe	Osaka
19:30 JST		Report	Watanabe (yellow card) 45+1'; Nishi (yellow card) 49'	Stadium: Yanmar Stadium Nagai; Attendance: 4,981; Referee: Masuya Ueda

26 July 2020 7	Vissel Kobe	0–2	Gamba Osaka	Hyōgo-ku, Kobe
19:00 JST		Report	Ono 62'; Fukuda (yellow card) 75'; Matsuda (yellow card) 75'; Usami 86'	Stadium: Noevir Stadium Kobe; Attendance: 4,746; Referee: Yudai Yamamoto

2 August 2020 8	Consadole Sapporo	2–3	Vissel Kobe	Toyohira-ku, Sapporo
14:03 JST	Arano 29', 48'	Report	Yamaguchi 31', 62'; Douglas 45'; Iikura (yellow card) 58'	Stadium: Sapporo Dome; Attendance: 4,675; Referee: Yuichi Nishimura

8 August 2020 9	Vissel Kobe	1–2	Vegalta Sendai	Hyōgo-ku, Kobe
15:00 JST	Samper (yellow card) 45'; Słowik 86' (o.g.)	Report	Dankler 22' (o.g.); Akasaki 72'	Stadium: Noevir Stadium Kobe; Referee: Yoshiro Imamura

16 August 2020 10	Kashima Antlers	2–2	Vissel Kobe	Kashima, Ibaraki
18:30 JST	Silva (yellow card) 34'; Everaldo 38'; Hirose (yellow card) 71'; Araki 90+4'	Report	Dankler 19'; Goke 61'; Iniesta (yellow card) 63'; Douglas (yellow card) 67'	Stadium: Kashima Soccer Stadium; Referee: Minoru Tōjō

19 August 2020 11	Vissel Kobe	2–3	Kashiwa Reysol	Hyōgo-ku, Kobe
19:00 JST	Goke 45'; Osaki (yellow card) 81'; Douglas 89'	Report	Nakama 46'; Olunga 76'; Mihara 90+4'	Stadium: Noevir Stadium Kobe; Referee: Koichiro Fukushima

23 August 2020 12	Urawa Red Diamonds	1–2	Vissel Kobe	Midori-ku, Saitama
19:03 JST	Deng 33'; Nishikawa (yellow card) 53'; Leonardo (yellow card) 90+6'	Report	Ogawa 15'; Yamaguchi 82'; Dankler (yellow card) 90+3'	Stadium: Saitama Stadium 2002; Attendance: 4,435; Referee: Yuichi Nishimura

26 August 2020 24	Vissel Kobe	2–2	Kawasaki Frontale	Hyōgo-ku, Kobe
19:00 JST	Nishi 30'; Douglas 42'	Report	Oshima 23'; Hatate 75'	Stadium: Noevir Stadium Kobe; Attendance: 3,453; Referee: Yoshiro Imamura
Note: rescheduled due to Kobe's later AFC Champions League commitments.

29 August 2020 13	Vissel Kobe	3–3	Yokohama F. Marinos	Hyōgo-ku, Kobe
17:00 JST	Fujimoto 18', 89'; Furuhashi 90'	Report	Júnior 27', 33' (pen.); Nakagawa 53'	Stadium: Noevir Stadium Kobe; Referee: Ryuji Sato

5 September 2020 14	Shonan Bellmare	1–1	Vissel Kobe	Hiratsuka
17:30 JST	Oiwa 50'	Report	Sakai 53'	Stadium: Shonan BMW Stadium Hiratsuka; Referee: Hayato Shimizu

9 September 2020 15	Kawasaki Frontale	3–2	Vissel Kobe	Kawasaki, Kanagawa
18:30 JST	Kobayashi 8'; Damião 83'; Miyashiro 85'	Report	Furuhashi 23'; Fujimoto 59'	Stadium: Kawasaki Todoroki Stadium; Attendance: 4,778; Referee: Hiroyuki Kimura

12 September 2020 16	Vissel Kobe	2–2	FC Tokyo	Hyōgo-ku, Kobe
18:00 JST	Yasui 24'; Dankler 90+3'	Report	Adaílton 50'; Oliveira 58'	Stadium: Noevir Stadium Kobe; Referee: Jumpei Iida

16 September 2020 25	Vissel Kobe	0–1	Cerezo Osaka	Hyōgo-ku, Kobe
18:00 JST		Report	Kakitani 62'	Stadium: Noevir Stadium Kobe
Note: rescheduled due to Kobe's later AFC Champions League commitments.

19 September 2020 17	Nagoya Grampus	2–1	Vissel Kobe	Toyota, Aichi
18:00 JST	Kanazaki 42' (pen.), 56' (pen.)	Report	Yamaguchi 15'	Stadium: Toyota Stadium

23 September 2020 18	Vissel Kobe	4–3	Sagan Tosu	Hyōgo-ku, Kobe
18:00 JST	Yamaguchi 9'; Iniesta 20'; Furuhashi 55', 68'	Report	Kanamori 17'; Harakawa 51'; Hayashi 71'	Stadium: Noevir Stadium Kobe; Referee: Yoshiro Imamura

26 September 2020 19	Vissel Kobe	4–0	Consadole Sapporo	Hyōgo-ku, Kobe
18:00 JST	Furuhashi 19', 62'; Goke 45'; Oda 90'	Report		Stadium: Noevir Stadium Kobe; Referee: Hajime Matsuo

30 September 2020 29	Vissel Kobe	1–0	Nagoya Grampus	Hyōgo-ku, Kobe
18:00 JST	Iniesta 60'	Report		Stadium: Noevir Stadium Kobe; Referee: Ryuji Sato
Note: rescheduled due to Kobe's later AFC Champions League commitments.

3 October 2020 20	Yokohama F. Marinos	2–3	Vissel Kobe	Yokohama
15:00 JST	Edigar 3'; Koike 90+3'	Report	Douglas 7'; Iniesta 11' (pen.); Furuhashi 56'	Stadium: Nissan Stadium; Referee: Jumpei Iida

10 October 2020 21	Kashiwa Reysol	4–3	Vissel Kobe	Kashiwa
14:00 JST	Olunga 20', 44'; Esaka 39', 52'	Report	Tanaka 60', 75'; Iniesta 87' (pen.)	Stadium: Sankyo Frontier Kashiwa Stadium; Referee: Koei Koya

14 October 2020 22	Vissel Kobe	1–1	Oita Trinita	Hyōgo-ku, Kobe
18:00 JST	Fujimoto 6'	Report	Sakai 86' (o.g.)	Stadium: Noevir Stadium Kobe; Referee: Hayato Shimizu

17 October 2020 23	Sanfrecce Hiroshima	2–1	Vissel Kobe	Asaminami-ku, Hiroshima
16:00 JST	Sasaki 43'; Pereira 45+3'	Report	Dankler 84'	Stadium: Edion Stadium Hiroshima; Referee: Hajime Matsuo

21 October 2020 33	Vissel Kobe	1–3	Kashima Antlers	Hyōgo-ku, Kobe
17:00 JST	Fujimoto 61'	Report	Ueda 12'; Izumi 43'; Doi 78'	Stadium: Noevir Stadium Kobe; Referee: Nobutsugu Murakami
Note: rescheduled due to Kobe's later AFC Champions League commitments.

28 October 2020 30	Vegalta Sendai	2–3	Vissel Kobe	Sendai
18:00 JST	Nagasawa 53'; Iio 76'	Report	Furuhashi 47'; Goke 51'; Douglas 77'	Stadium: Yurtec Stadium Sendai; Referee: Koichiro Fukushima
Note: rescheduled due to Kobe's later AFC Champions League commitments.

3 November 2020 26	Shimizu S-Pulse	3–1	Vissel Kobe	Shimizu-ku, Shizuoka
13:00 JST	Valdo 60'; Elsinho 75'; Kanai 87'	Report	Yamaguchi 33'	Stadium: IAI Stadium Nihondaira; Referee: Ryuji Sato

8 November 2020 28	Yokohama FC	2–1	Vissel Kobe	Kanagawa-ku, Yokohama
TBD JST	Ichimi 11'; Yasunaga 90+1'	Report	Goke 9'	Stadium: NHK Spring Mitsuzawa Football Stadium; Referee: Takuto Okabe
Note: rescheduled due to Kobe's later AFC Champions League commitments.

11 November 2020 32	Gamba Osaka	1–0	Vissel Kobe	Suita
17:00 JST	Patric 27'	Report		Stadium: Panasonic Stadium; Referee: Jumpei Iida
Note: rescheduled due to Kobe's later AFC Champions League commitments.

14 November 2020 27	Vissel Kobe	0–2	Shonan Bellmare	Hyōgo-ku, Kobe
TBD JST		Report	Okamoto 77'; Saito 84'	Stadium: Noevir Stadium Kobe; Referee: Masuya Ueda

18 November 2020 31	Vissel Kobe	0–1	Urawa Red Diamonds	Hyōgo-ku, Kobe
16:00 JST		Report	Martinus 83'	Stadium: Noevir Stadium Kobe; Referee: Yoshiro Imamura
Note: rescheduled due to Kobe's later AFC Champions League commitments.

19 December 2020 34	FC Tokyo	1–0	Vissel Kobe	Chōfu, Tokyo
TBD JST	Oumari 85'	Report		Stadium: Ajinomoto Stadium; Referee: Yusuke Araki

=== J.League Cup ===
2 September 2020 Quarter-final	Vissel Kobe	0–6	Kawasaki Frontale	Kobe, Hyogo
19:03 JST		Report	Kobayashi 7' 13'; Saito 21'; Ienaga 46'; Wakizaka 72'; Miyashiro 87'	Stadium: Noevir Stadium Kobe; Attendance: 3,925; Referee: Yusuke Araki

=== Japanese Super Cup ===
8 February 2020 Final	Yokohama F. Marinos	3–3	Vissel Kobe	Saitama
13:35 JST	Marcos Júnior 36'; Ogihara 54'; Erik 73'	Report	Douglas 27'; Furuhashi 40'; Yamaguchi 69'	Stadium: Saitama Stadium 2002; Attendance: 51,397; Referee: Yoshiro Imamura
	Penalties
	Thiago Martins (penalty scored); Ogihara (penalty scored); Edigar Junio (penalty missed); Mizunuma (penalty missed); Matsubara (penalty missed); Wada (penalty missed); Endo (penalty missed)		(penalty scored) Iniesta; (penalty scored) Tanaka; (penalty missed) Ogawa; (penalty missed) Nishi; (penalty missed) Osaki; (penalty missed) Vermaelen; (penalty scored) Yamaguchi

=== AFC Champions League ===
==== Group stage ====
Pos	Team	Pld	W	D	L	GF	GA	GD	Pts	Qualification	VIS	SUW	GZE	JDT
1	(Japan) Vissel Kobe	4	2	0	2	4	5	−1	6	Round of 16	—	0–2	0–2	~~5–1~~
2	(South Korea) Suwon Samsung Bluewings	4	1	2	1	3	2	+1	5	Round of 16	0–1	—	0–0	~~25 Nov~~
3	(China) Guangzhou Evergrande	4	1	2	1	4	4	0	5		1–3	1–1	—	~~4 Dec~~
4	(Malaysia) Johor Darul Ta'zim	0	0	0	0	0	0	0	0	Withdrew, results expunged (Note: Johor Darul Ta'zim were unable to travel to Qatar to play the final four matches of the group stage after their application for permission to travel was refused by the Malaysian government due to COVID-19 pandemic travel restrictions. They were considered to have withdrawn from the competition, and their results were expunged.)	~~1 Dec~~	~~2–1~~	~~19 Nov~~	—

Source: AFC
Notes:

Matches

12 February 2020	Vissel Kobe (Japan)	Voided (5–1)	(Malaysia) Johor Darul Ta'zim	Noevir Stadium Kobe, Kobe
19:00 UTC+9	Ogawa 13', 58', 72'; Furuhashi 28'; Douglas 65'	Live Report; Stats Report	Safawi 27' (pen.)	Attendance: 7,256; Referee: Alireza Faghani (Iran)

19 February 2020	Suwon Samsung Bluewings (South Korea)	0–1	Vissel Kobe	Suwon World Cup Stadium, Suwon
19:30 UTC+9		Live Report; Stats Report	Furuhashi 90'	Attendance: 17,372; Referee: Mohanad Qassim (Iraq)

25 November 2020 (Note: The AFC announced on 29 January 2020 that the group stage matches which Chinese teams were supposed to host on matchdays 1, 2, and 3 would be switched with the corresponding away matches due to the COVID-19 pandemic in China. Later, the order of matches between Beijing FC and Melbourne Victory, Guangzhou Evergrande and Vissel Kobe, and Shanghai SIPG and Yokohama F. Marinos, were switched from the revised schedule.)	Guangzhou Evergrande (China)	1–3	(Japan) Vissel Kobe	Khalifa International Stadium, Doha
13:00 UTC+3	Furuhashi 55' (o.g.)	Live Report; Stats Report	Furuhashi 44'; Douglas 74'; Iniesta 84'	Attendance: 0 Referee: Nawaf Shukralla (Bahrain)

28 November 2020	Vissel Kobe (Japan)	0–2	(China) Guangzhou Evergrande	Al Janoub Stadium, Al Wakrah
13:00 UTC+3		Live Report; Stats Report	Talisca 17' (pen.); Ai Kesen 36'	Attendance: 0 Referee: Alireza Faghani (Iran)

1 December 2020	Johor Darul Ta'zim (Malaysia)	Cancelled	(Japan) Vissel Kobe	Khalifa International Stadium, Doha
16:00 UTC+3		Live Report; Stats Report

4 December 2020	Vissel Kobe (Japan)	0–2	(South Korea) Suwon Samsung Bluewings	Khalifa International Stadium, Doha
16:00 UTC+3		Live Report; Stats Report	Kim Gun-hee 49'; Lim Sang-hyub 68' (pen.)	Attendance: 0 Referee: Ali Sabah (Iraq)

==== Knockout stage ====
7 December 2020 Round of 16	Vissel Kobe (Japan)	2–0	(China) Shanghai SIPG	Khalifa International Stadium, Doha
13:00 UTC+3	Iniesta 31'; Nishi 50'	Live Report; Stats Report		Attendance: 0 Referee: Chris Beath (Australia)

10 December 2020 Quarter-final	Vissel Kobe (Japan)	1–1 (a.e.t.) (7–6 p)	(South Korea) Suwon Samsung Bluewings	Al Janoub Stadium, Al Wakrah
17:00 UTC+3	Furuhashi 40'	Live Report; Stats Report	Park Sang-hyeok 7'	Referee: Adham Makhadmeh (Jordan)
	Penalties
	Iniesta (penalty scored); Douglas (penalty scored); Hatsuse (penalty scored); Furuhashi (penalty scored); Yamaguchi (penalty scored); Yamakawa (penalty scored); Fujimoto (penalty scored)		(penalty scored) Kim Gun-hee; (penalty scored) Lee Ki-je; (penalty scored) Kim Min-woo; (penalty scored) Ko Seung-beom; (penalty scored) Han Seok-jong; (penalty scored) Min Sang-gi; (penalty missed) Jang Ho-ik

13 December 2020 Semi-final	Ulsan Hyundai (South Korea)	2–1 (a.e.t.)	(Japan) Vissel Kobe	Jassim Bin Hamad Stadium, Doha (Note: The semi-final of the East Region was originally scheduled to be played at Al Janoub Stadium, Al Wakrah, but was moved to Jassim Bin Hamad Stadium, Doha, to ensure optimum pitch conditions for the semi-final and the final.)
13:00 UTC+3	Johnsen 81'; Júnior 119' (pen.)	Live Report; Stats Report	Yamaguchi 52'	Attendance: 0 Referee: Nawaf Shukralla (Bahrain)

== Statistics ==
=== Goal scorers ===
Rank	No.	Pos.	Player	J.League	Emperor's Cup	J.League Cup	Japanese Super Cup	AFC Champions League	Total
1	11	FW	(Japan) Kyogo Furuhashi	12	0	0	1	4	17
2	49	FW	(Brazil) Douglas	7	0	0	1	2	9
3	5	MF	(Japan) Hotaru Yamaguchi	6	0	0	1	1	8
4	14	MF	(Spain) Andrés Iniesta	4	0	0	0	2	6
5	9	FW	(Japan) Noriaki Fujimoto	5	0	0	0	0	5
5	27	MF	(Japan) Yuta Goke	5	0	0	0	0	5
7	13	FW	(Japan) Keijiro Ogawa	1	0	0	0	3	4
8	33	DF	(Brazil) Dankler	3	0	0	0	0	3
9	21	FW	(Japan) Junya Tanaka	2	0	0	0	0	2
9	22	DF	(Japan) Daigo Nishi	1	0	0	0	1	2
11	14	MF	(Japan) Takuya Yasui	1	0	0	0	0	1
11	24	DF	(Japan) Gōtoku Sakai	1	0	0	0	0	1
11	41	FW	(Japan) Yutaro Oda	1	0	0	0	0	1
Own goals				1	0	0	0	0	1
Total				50	0	0	3	13	66

Last updated: 13 December 2020.
Source: Competitions

=== Clean sheets ===
Rank	No.	Pos.	Player	J.League	Emperor's Cup	J.League Cup	Japanese Super Cup	AFC Champions League	Total
1	18	GK	(Japan) Hiroki Iikura	4	0	0	0	2	6
Total				4	0	0	0	2	6

Last updated: 10 December 2020.
Source: Competitions
