= 2011 Vissel Kobe season =

Vissel Kobe
2011 season
- Manager: Masahiro Wada
- J. League Division 1: 9th
- Emperor's Cup: Third round
- J. League Cup: First round
Home colours	Away colours

The 2011 Vissel Kobe season was Vissel Kobe's fifth consecutive season and 14th overall in J. League Division 1. It also includes the 2011 J. League Cup, and the 2011 Emperor's Cup.

== Competitions ==
=== J. League ===
==== League table ====
Pos	Team	Pld	W	D	L	GF	GA	GD	Pts
7	Sanfrecce Hiroshima	34	14	8	12	52	49	+3	50
8	Júbilo Iwata	34	13	8	13	53	45	+8	47
9	Vissel Kobe	34	13	7	14	44	45	−1	46
10	Shimizu S-Pulse	34	11	12	11	42	51	−9	45
11	Kawasaki Frontale	34	13	5	16	52	53	−1	44

Updated to match(es) played on December 3, 2011. Source: J.League Division 1
Rules for classification: 1st points; 2nd goal differential; 3rd goals scored; 4th head-to-head results; 5th disciplinary points; 6th draw. If two clubs are tied for first place, both clubs will be declared.

==== Results summary ====
6 March 2011 Round 1	Vissel Kobe	1 - 0	Urawa Red Diamonds	HOME'S Stadium Kobe
Sunday 13:05	Popó 76'	Report		Attendance: 19,913; Referee: Iida

==== Results by round ====
Round	1	2	3	4	5	6	7	8	9	10	11	12	13	14	15	16	17	18	19	20	21	22	23	24	25	26	27	28	29	30	31	32	33	34
Ground	H																																	
Result	W																																	
Position	5																																	

Updated to match(es) played on 7 March 2011. Source: "World-Football.net".
A = Away; H = Home; W = Win; D = Draw; L = Loss

=== Emperor's Cup ===
2011-10-10 Second round	Vissel Kobe	8 – 0	Sanyo Electric Sumoto S.C.	Kakogawa Athletic Stadium, Kakogawa
13:00	Morioka 22', 32', 46'; Matsuoka 26'; Popó 31', 55'; Park 58'; Botti 68'	Report		Attendance: 2,471; Referee: Hiroyoshi Takayama

2011-11-16 Third round	FC Tokyo	2 – 1 (a.e.t.)	Vissel Kobe	Ajinomoto Stadium, Chōfu
19:00	Takahashi 13'; Morishige 120+1'	Report	Komoto 37'	Attendance: 5,937; Referee: Kenji Ogiya
