= Hotaru Yamaguchi =

Japanese footballer

Hotaru Yamaguchi 山口 蛍
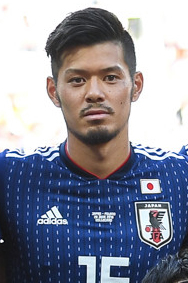
- Yamaguchi lining up for Japan at the 2018 FIFA World Cup

Personal information
- Full name: Hotaru Yamaguchi
- Date of birth: 6 October 1990 (age 36)
- Place of birth: Nabari, Mie, Japan
- Height: 1.74 m (5 ft 9 in)
- Position: Defensive midfielder

Team information
- Current team: V-Varen Nagasaki
- Number: 5

Youth career
- 2000–2002: Minowa West SC
- 2003–2008: Cerezo Osaka

Senior career*
| Years | Team | Apps | (Gls) |
| 2009–2015 | Cerezo Osaka | 140 | (11) |
| 2016 | Hannover 96 | 6 | (0) |
| 2016–2018 | Cerezo Osaka | 85 | (3) |
| 2019–2024 | Vissel Kobe | 192 | (23) |
| 2025– | V-Varen Nagasaki | 53 | (4) |

International career^{‡}
| 2010–2012 | Japan U23 | 29 | (1) |
| 2013–2019 | Japan | 48 | (3) |
Medal record
Representing Japan
Asian Games
| Gold medal – first place | 2010 Guangzhou | Team |
- * Club domestic league appearances and goals as of 11 August 2026 ‡ National team caps and goals as of 19 November 2019

Hotaru Yamaguchi (山口 蛍, Yamaguchi Hotaru; born 6 October 1990) is a Japanese professional footballer who plays as a defensive midfielder and currently plays for J1 League club, V-Varen Nagasaki. He was also a member of the Japan national team until 2019.

== Club career ==
=== Early career ===
Yamaguchi began playing football in the third grade, playing mostly as an attacking midfielder. Upon entering junior high, he participated in trials with the Cerezo Osaka, Gamba Osaka and Kyoto Purple Sanga youth academies and ultimately joined the Cerezo Under-15 team, from whom he received an invitation on the spot. He enjoyed steady progress at the club, being selected to be part of the first entering class of the Japan Football Association Elite Program at the end of his first year. In 2006 Yamaguchi was promoted to the Cerezo Under-18 team, which later won the JFA Prince League U-18 in the 2008 season, in which he served as captain and was named league MVP.

=== Cerezo Osaka ===
Along with academy teammate Yusuke Maruhashi, Yamaguchi was promoted to the senior team in 2009, spending three months of the season training with the Palmeiras Under-21 academy. He was named to the Japan Under-21 team in his second season and played in all of the matches in a gold medal campaign at the 2010 Asian Games in Guangzhou.

Yamaguchi began to receive substantial playing time with Cerezo in 2011, scoring his first league goal on Matchday 24 against Urawa Reds. The addition of Fábio Simplício resulted in Yamaguchi being increasingly deployed as an attacking midfielder toward the latter part of the season, which he finished with 30 appearances. He followed up by winning a regular position on the Cerezo side in 2012, combining with Takahiro Ogihara in central midfield for both club and country, and being named to the Under-23 team.

=== Hannover 96 ===
On 21 December 2015, Hannover 96 announced that they signed Yamaguchi. Yamaguchi played for Hannover 96 in 2016, however returned to Cerezo Osaka mid-season.

=== Vissel Kobe ===
On 19 December 2018, Yamaguchi sympathized with the goal of seriously aiming for the J1 League and AFC Champions League and officially completed a transfer to Vissel Kobe (later, he achieved the league championship as his goal). According to the media, it was a three-year contract with an annual salary of over ¥100,000,000, totaling over ¥400,000,000.

=== V-Varen Nagasaki ===
On 23 December 2024, Yamaguchi announcement officially transfer to J2 club, V-Varen Nagasaki from 2025.

== International career ==
Yamaguchi represented the U-23 national side under Takashi Sekizuka in Japan's successful qualification for the 2012 Summer Olympics. He was included in the final squad at the 2012 Summer Olympics, contributing to a fourth-place finish at the tournament.

In July 2013, Yamaguchi received his first call up to the senior Japan side by Alberto Zaccheroni for the 2013 EAFF East Asian Cup, where he played in all three matches and was named tournament MVP.

In May 2018, he was named in Japan's preliminary squad for the 2018 FIFA World Cup in Russia.

== Career statistics ==
=== Club ===
As of the match played 23 February 2025.

Appearances and goals by club, season and competition
| Club | Season | League | | | National Cup | | League Cup | | Continental | | Other (Note: Appearances in J2 Play-offs) | | Total | |
| Club | Season | Division | Apps | Goals | Apps | Goals | Apps | Goals | Apps | Goals | Apps | Goals | Apps | Goals |
|---|---|---|---|---|---|---|---|---|---|---|---|---|---|---|
| Cerezo Osaka | 2009 | J.League Div 2 | 3 | 0 | 0 | 0 | — | | — | | — | | 3 | 0 |
| Cerezo Osaka | 2010 | J.League Div 1 | 2 | 0 | 0 | 0 | 2 | 0 | — | | — | | 4 | 0 |
| Cerezo Osaka | 2011 | J.League Div 1 | 17 | 1 | 4 | 0 | 0 | 0 | 2 | 0 | — | | 23 | 1 |
| Cerezo Osaka | 2012 | J.League Div 1 | 30 | 2 | 4 | 2 | 6 | 0 | — | | — | | 40 | 4 |
| Cerezo Osaka | 2013 | J.League Div 1 | 34 | 6 | 0 | 0 | 8 | 1 | — | | — | | 42 | 7 |
| Cerezo Osaka | 2014 | J.League Div 1 | 19 | 1 | 1 | 0 | 0 | 0 | 8 | 0 | — | | 28 | 1 |
| Cerezo Osaka | 2015 | J2 League | 35 | 1 | 0 | 0 | — | | — | | 2 | 0 | 37 | 1 |
| Cerezo Osaka | 2016 | J2 League | 19 | 1 | 1 | 0 | — | | — | | 2 | 0 | 22 | 1 |
| Cerezo Osaka | 2017 | J1 League | 32 | 2 | 5 | 1 | 2 | 0 | — | | — | | 39 | 3 |
| Cerezo Osaka | 2018 | J1 League | 33 | 0 | 1 | 0 | 1 | 0 | 4 | 0 | — | | 39 | 0 |
| Cerezo Osaka | Total | | 226 | 14 | 16 | 3 | 19 | 1 | 14 | 0 | 4 | 0 | 279 | 18 |
| Hannover 96 | 2015–16 | Bundesliga | 6 | 0 | 0 | 0 | — | | — | | — | | 6 | 0 |
| Vissel Kobe | 2019 | J1 League | 34 | 3 | 5 | 2 | 2 | 1 | — | | — | | 41 | 6 |
| Vissel Kobe | 2020 | J1 League | 34 | 6 | — | | 1 | 0 | 7 | 1 | — | | 42 | 7 |
| Vissel Kobe | 2021 | J1 League | 32 | 5 | 3 | 0 | 8 | 1 | — | | — | | 43 | 6 |
| Vissel Kobe | 2022 | J1 League | 33 | 2 | 3 | 0 | 2 | 0 | 6 | 0 | — | | 44 | 2 |
| Vissel Kobe | 2023 | J1 League | 32 | 4 | 3 | 0 | 2 | 0 | — | | — | | 37 | 4 |
| Vissel Kobe | 2024 | J1 League | 27 | 3 | 3 | 0 | 0 | 0 | | | — | | 30 | 3 |
| Vissel Kobe | Total | | 192 | 23 | 17 | 2 | 15 | 2 | 13 | 1 | 0 | 0 | 237 | 28 |
| V-Varen Nagasaki | 2025 | J2 League | 2 | 0 | 0 | 0 | 0 | 0 | — | | — | | 2 | 0 |
| V-Varen Nagasaki | Total | | 2 | 0 | 0 | 0 | 0 | 0 | – | | – | | 2 | 0 |
| Career total | | | 426 | 37 | 33 | 5 | 34 | 3 | 27 | 1 | 4 | 0 | 524 | 46 |

=== International ===
As of 19 November 2019

Appearances and goals by national team and year
| National team | Year | Apps | Goals |
|---|---|---|---|
| Japan | 2013 | 8 | 0 |
| Japan | 2014 | 7 | 0 |
| Japan | 2015 | 9 | 1 |
| Japan | 2016 | 6 | 1 |
| Japan | 2017 | 8 | 0 |
| Japan | 2018 | 7 | 0 |
| Japan | 2019 | 3 | 1 |
| Total | | 48 | 3 |

Scores and results list Japan's goal tally first, score column indicates score after each Yamaguchi goal.

List of international goals scored by Hotaru Yamaguchi
| No. | Date | Venue | Opponent | Score | Result | Competition |
|---|---|---|---|---|---|---|
| 1 | 5 August 2015 | Wuhan Sports Center Stadium, Wuhan, China | South Korea | 1–1 | 1–1 | 2015 EAFF East Asian Cup |
| 2 | 6 October 2016 | Saitama Stadium 2002, Saitama, Japan | Iraq | 2–1 | 2–1 | 2018 FIFA World Cup qualification |
| 3 | 19 November 2019 | Panasonic Stadium Suita, Suita, Japan | Venezuela | 1–4 | 1–4 | 2019 Kirin Challenge Cup |

== Honours ==
Cerezo Osaka

- Emperor's Cup: 2017
- J.League Cup: 2017
- Japanese Super Cup: 2018

Vissel Kobe

- J1 League: 2023, 2024
- Emperor's Cup: 2019, 2024
- Japanese Super Cup: 2020

Japan

- EAFF East Asian Cup: 2013

Japan U-23

- Asian Games: 2010

Individual

- EAFF East Asian Cup Most Valuable Player: 2013
- J.League Best XI: 2013, 2017, 2023
