= Noriaki Fujimoto =

Japanese footballer

Noriaki Fujimoto 藤本 憲明
Personal information
- Full name: Noriaki Fujimoto
- Date of birth: 19 August 1989 (age 37)
- Place of birth: Tondabayashi, Osaka, Japan
- Height: 1.75 m (5 ft 9 in)
- Position: Striker

Team information
- Current team: Kagoshima United
- Number: 24

Youth career
- 2005–2007: Aomori Yamada High School

College career
Years	Team	Apps	(Gls)
2008–2011	Kindai University		

Senior career*
Years	Team	Apps	(Gls)
2012–2015	SP Kyoto FC	93	(23)
2016–2017	Kagoshima United	57	(39)
2018–2019	Oita Trinita	47	(20)
2019–2022	Vissel Kobe	47	(7)
2021	→ Shimizu S-Pulse (loan)	9	(1)
2023–	Kagoshima United	0	(0)
- * Club domestic league appearances and goals as of 24 January 2023, 16:24 (UTC)

Noriaki Fujimoto (藤本 憲明, Fujimoto Noriaki; born August 19, 1989) is a Japanese football player as a striker, currently play for Kagoshima United.

== Career ==
Fujimoto attended Kindai University in Osaka for four years: after that, he was signed by SP Kyoto FC.

He scored for three consecutive seasons, but in the end SP Kyoto FC was disbanded in November 2015. As a free agent, Fujimoto signed a new contract with J3 newly promoted side Kagoshima United FC.

On 24 January 2023, Fujimoto announcement return to former club, Kagoshima United for ahead of 2023 season. It will be the first time return to former club in 6 years.

== Career statistics ==
=== Club ===
Updated to the start of 2023 season.

Club performance			League		Cup		League Cup		Continental		Other		Total	
Season	Club	League	Apps	Goals	Apps	Goals	Apps	Goals	Apps	Goals	Apps	Goals	Apps	Goals
Japan			League		Emperor's Cup		J.League Cup		Asia		Other		Total	
2012	SP Kyoto FC	JFL	19	0	–		–		–		–		19	0
2013	SP Kyoto FC	JFL	25	6	2	1	–		–		–		27	7
2014	SP Kyoto FC	JFL	21	8	–		–		–		–		21	8
2015	SP Kyoto FC	JFL	28	9	–		–		–		–		28	9
2016	Kagoshima United FC	J3 League	27	15	1	2	–		–		–		28	17
2017	Kagoshima United FC	J3 League	30	24	2	1	–		–		–		32	25
2018	Oita Trinita	J2 League	26	12	1	0	–		–		–		27	12
2019	Oita Trinita	J1 League	21	8	0	0	1	0	–		–		22	8
2019	Vissel Kobe	J1 League	7	1	3	2	–		–		–		10	3
2020	Vissel Kobe	J1 League	28	6	–		1	0	6	0	0	0	35	6
2021	Vissel Kobe	J1 League	9	0	2	0	6	0	0	0	0	0	17	0
2022	Vissel Kobe	J1 League	3	0	1	0	–		0	0	0	0	4	0
2021	Shimizu S-Pulse (loan)	J1 League	9	1	–		–		–		–		9	1
2023	Kagoshima United	J3 League	0	0	0	0	–		–		–		0	0
Total			253	90	12	6	8	0	6	0	0	0	279	96

== Honours ==
=== Club ===
Vissel Kobe

- Emperor's Cup: 2019
- Japanese Super Cup: 2020
