= 2020 Japanese Super Cup =

Yokohama F. Marinos	Vissel Kobe
3	3
- Vissel Kobe won 3–2 on penalties
- Date: 8 February 2020
- Venue: Saitama Stadium 2002, Saitama
- Referee: Yoshiro Imamura
- Attendance: 51,397
- Weather: Fine; 12.3 °C (54.1 °F); 37% humidity

The 2020 Japanese Super Cup (known as Fuji Xerox Super Cup 2020 for sponsorship reasons) was the 27th Japanese Super Cup since its reestablishment, and the 35th overall. It was held on 8 February 2020 between the 2019 J1 League champions Yokohama F. Marinos and the 2019 Emperor's Cup winners Vissel Kobe. It took place at the Saitama Stadium 2002, Saitama, Saitama.

This was Marinos's first Super Cup appearance since 2014, and was looking to end its bad record of five defeats in all of its previous appearances, stretching back to 1984. At the other hand, this was Vissel's first ever Super Cup appearance.

Drawn 3–3 until the end of 90 minutes, Vissel Kobe won the match on penalties, which saw nine consecutive penalties missed before Hotaru Yamaguchi ended the run and won Vissel its only second national trophy ever. The penalty also condemned Marinos to its sixth Super Cup defeat.

== Match details ==
8 February 2020
13:35 JST

Yokohama F. Marinos	3–3	Vissel Kobe
Marcos Júnior 36'; Ogihara 54'; Erik 73'	Report	Douglas 27'; Furuhashi 40'; Yamaguchi 69'
Penalties
Thiago Martins (penalty scored); Ogihara (penalty scored); Edigar (penalty missed); Mizunuma (penalty missed); Matsubara (penalty missed); Wada (penalty missed); Endo (penalty missed)	2–3	(penalty scored) Iniesta; (penalty scored) Tanaka; (penalty missed) Ogawa; (penalty missed) Nishi; (penalty missed) Osaki; (penalty missed) Vermaelen; (penalty scored) Yamaguchi

Saitama Stadium 2002, Saitama
Attendance: 51,397
Referee: Yoshiro Imamura

Yokohama F. Marinos	Vissel Kobe

GK	1	(South Korea) Park Il-gyu
RB	27	(Japan) Ken Matsubara
CB	13	(Brazil) Thiago Martins
CB	44	(Japan) Shinnosuke Hatanaka		(substituted off) 46'
LB	5	(Thailand) Theerathon Bunmathan
CM	8	(Japan) Takuya Kida (c)	(yellow card) 62'	(substituted off) 74'
CM	6	(Japan) Takahiro Ogihara
RW	23	(Japan) Teruhito Nakagawa
AM	9	(Brazil) Marcos Júnior		(substituted off) 88'
LW	17	(Brazil) Erik		(substituted off) 74'
CF	45	(Japan) Ado Onaiwu		(substituted off) 46'
Substitutes:
GK	21	(Japan) Yuji Kajikawa
DF	15	(Japan) Makito Ito		(substituted in) 46'
MF	7	(Japan) Yūki Ōtsu
MF	11	(Japan) Keita Endo		(substituted in) 46'
MF	33	(Japan) Takuya Wada		(substituted in) 74'
FW	18	(Japan) Kota Mizunuma		(substituted in) 88'
FW	30	(Brazil) Edigar Junio		(substituted in) 74'
Manager:
(Australia) Ange Postecoglou

GK	18	(Japan) Hiroki Iikura
CB	33	(Brazil) Dankler
CB	25	(Japan) Leo Osaki
CB	4	(Belgium) Thomas Vermaelen
RM	22	(Japan) Daigo Nishi	(yellow card) 90+2'
CM	6	(Spain) Sergi Samper		(substituted off) 85'
CM	5	(Japan) Hotaru Yamaguchi
LM	24	(Japan) Gōtoku Sakai
AM	8	(Spain) Andrés Iniesta (c)	(yellow card) 53'
CF	49	(Brazil) Douglas		(substituted off) 64'
CF	11	(Japan) Kyogo Furuhashi		(substituted off) 85'
Substitutes:
GK	1	(Japan) Daiya Maekawa
DF	3	(Japan) Hirofumi Watanabe
DF	10	(Japan) So Fujitani
MF	14	(Japan) Takuya Yasui		(substituted in) 85'
FW	9	(Japan) Noriaki Fujimoto
FW	13	(Japan) Keijiro Ogawa		(substituted in) 85'
FW	21	(Japan) Junya Tanaka		(substituted in) 64'
Manager:
(Germany) Thorsten Fink

Assistant referees:
Masahiro Horikoshi
Naoya Okawa
Fourth official:
Akihiko Ikeuchi
Video assistant referee:
Jumpei Iida
Toru Sagara

Match rules

- 90 minutes.
- Penalty shoot-out if scores still level.
- Seven named substitutes.
- Maximum of five substitutions.
