= Gōtoku Sakai =

American-born Japanese footballer (born 1991)

Gōtoku Sakai 酒井 高徳
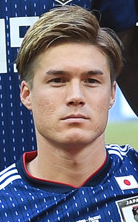
- Sakai lining up for Japan at the 2018 FIFA World Cup

Personal information
- Full name: Gōtoku Sakai
- Date of birth: 14 March 1991 (age 35)
- Place of birth: New York City, United States
- Height: 1.76 m (5 ft 9 in)
- Positions: Left-back; right-back

Team information
- Current team: Vissel Kobe
- Number: 24

Youth career
- 2006–2008: Albirex Niigata

Senior career*
Years	Team	Apps	(Gls)
2009–2013	Albirex Niigata	74	(1)
2012–2013	→ VfB Stuttgart (loan)	28	(0)
2013–2015	VfB Stuttgart	43	(1)
2015–2019	Hamburger SV	112	(1)
2019–	Vissel Kobe	219	(9)

International career
2009–2010	Japan U20	7	(2)
2011–2012	Japan U23	13	(0)
2012–2018	Japan	42	(0)
- * Club domestic league appearances and goals as of 10 August 2026

Gōtoku Sakai (酒井 高徳, Sakai Gōtoku; born 14 March 1991) is a professional footballer who plays as a left-back for Vissel Kobe. He was born in the United States but raised in Japan, where he represented internationally.

== Club career ==
=== Early career ===
Sakai was born in New York to a German mother and a Japanese father. The family moved to Japan when he was two years old. He grew up in Sanjō, Niigata prefecture. Sakai started playing football at Sanjō junior soccer club, together with his brother Noriyoshi. At age 15, he joined Albirex Niigata youth academy and entered Kaishu Gakuen High School. His team played at the Prince Takamado Premier/Prince League, Japan Club Youth U-18 Football Championship and J.League youth tournaments.

Years later in his final year at school, he was chosen as one of the designated players for development by J. League Division 1 and JFA. With this status, he was able to register as a J. League club player while he was still eligible to play for his school. He made his Albirex first-team debut, at the age of 17, on 15 November 2008 in the Emperor's Cup match against FC Tokyo. He officially signed with Albirex Niigata in the following season. After becoming professional, he was assigned the number 24 shirt. He made his professional football debut in the opening J1 League match of the 2009 season also against FC Tokyo.

=== VfB Stuttgart ===
On 1 January 2012, Gōtoku Sakai was loaned out to VfB Stuttgart until June 2013. VfB Stuttgart secured the contract option to sign Sakai permanently.

On 11 February 2012, Sakai made his Bundesliga debut for VfB Stuttgart in a 5–0 home victory against Hertha BSC. He made 14 starts and recorded five assists in his first Bundesliga season. Sakai scored his first goal for Stuttgart on 22 November 2012 in a 5–1 away victory against FC Steaua București in the 2012–13 UEFA Europa League group stage.

On 10 January 2013, Sakai signed a contract with Stuttgart until June 2016 and moved permanently to VfB.

=== Hamburger SV ===
In the 2015–16 season, Sakai joined Hamburger SV. Sakai became a key player for HSV and was made club captain in 2016. In 2018, the club suffered its first ever relegation from the Bundesliga, however, Sakai announced that he would renew his contract despite the relegation.

At the start of the 2019–20 season Hamburg allowed Sakai to leave, citing his wish to return home to Japan.

=== Vissel Kobe ===
On 14 August 2019, Sakai moved back to Japan to join Vissel Kobe.

== International career ==
Sakai played for Japan U20 at the 2010 AFC U-19 Championship in China. In 2011, he was named in Japan's final 23-man squad to compete at the 2011 AFC Asian Cup in Qatar but had to withdraw due to an injury.

On 21 September 2011, Sakai was in the starting line-up of the Japan under-22 team in the first group match of his team in the 2012 Summer Olympics Asian Qualifiers against Malaysia. In the following group match against Bahrain he came off the bench. He participated with the Japan under-23 team in the 2012 Toulon Tournament. On 2 July 2012, Sakai was called up for the 2012 Summer Olympics Football tournament in London.

He made his debut for the Japan senior national team on 6 September 2012 in the Kirin Cup against the United Arab Emirates.

Sakai underlined his outstanding potential in late 2012 when he was selected by influential football website IBWM in their list of the 100 most exciting players in world football for 2013.

In May 2018 he was named in Japan's squad for the 2018 FIFA World Cup in Russia. After Japan lost in the Round of 16 to Belgium, Sakai announced his retirement from international duty.

== Career statistics ==
=== Club ===
As of match played 8 December 2024

Appearances and goals by club, season and competition
Club	Season	League			National cup (Note: Includes Emperor's Cup, DFB-Pokal)		League cup (Note: Includes J. League Cup)		Continental		Other		Total	
Club	Season	Division	Apps	Goals	Apps	Goals	Apps	Goals	Apps	Goals	Apps	Goals	Apps	Goals
Albirex Niigata	2008	J1 League	0	0	1	0	0	0	—		—		1	0
Albirex Niigata	2009	J1 League	18	0	1	0	4	0	—		—		23	0
Albirex Niigata	2010	J1 League	31	0	0	0	4	0	—		—		35	0
Albirex Niigata	2011	J1 League	25	1	2	0	3	0	—		—		30	1
Albirex Niigata	Total		74	1	4	0	11	0	—		—		89	1
VfB Stuttgart (loan)	2011–12	Bundesliga	14	0	—		—		—		—		14	0
VfB Stuttgart (loan)	2012–13	Bundesliga	27	0	4	0	—		10 (Note: Appearances in UEFA Europa League)	1	—		41	1
VfB Stuttgart	2013–14	Bundesliga	28	0	2	0	—		2	0	—		32	0
VfB Stuttgart	2014–15	Bundesliga	18	1	1	0	—		—		—		19	1
VfB Stuttgart	Total		87	1	7	0	—		12	1	—		106	2
Hamburger SV	2015–16	Bundesliga	22	0	1	0	—		—		—		23	0
Hamburger SV	2016–17	Bundesliga	33	1	2	0	—		—		—		35	1
Hamburger SV	2017–18	Bundesliga	28	0	1	0	—		—		—		29	0
Hamburger SV	2018–19	2. Bundesliga	31	0	4	0	—		—		—		35	0
Hamburger SV	Total		114	1	8	0	—		—		—		122	1
Vissel Kobe	2019	J1 League	12	0	4	0	—		—		—		16	0
Vissel Kobe	2020	J1 League	32	1	0	0	1	0	7 (Note: Appearances in AFC Champions League)	0	1 (Note: Appearance in Japanese Super Cup)	0	41	1
Vissel Kobe	2021	J1 League	38	1	2	0	7	0	—		—		47	1
Vissel Kobe	2022	J1 League	34	1	3	1	1	0	6	0	—		44	2
Vissel Kobe	2023	J1 League	29	2	3	0	1	0	—		—		33	2
Vissel Kobe	2024	J1 League	28	1	4	0	0	0	3 (Note: Appearances in AFC Champions League Elite)	1	1	0	36	2
Vissel Kobe	2025	J1 League	0	0	0	0	0	0	0	0	0	0	0	0
Vissel Kobe	Total		173	6	14	1	10	0	16	1	2	0	217	8
Career total			448	9	33	1	21	0	28	2	2	0	533	12

=== International ===
As of 2 July 2018

Appearances and goals by national team and year
National team	Year	Apps	Goals
Japan	2012	2	0
Japan	2013	9	0
Japan	2014	7	0
Japan	2015	7	0
Japan	2016	7	0
Japan	2017	4	0
Japan	2018	6	0
Total		42	0

== Honours ==
VfB Stuttgart

- DFB-Pokal runner-up: 2012–13

Vissel Kobe

- J1 League: 2023, 2024
- Emperor's Cup: 2019, 2024
- Japanese Super Cup: 2020
- J1 100 Year Vision League: 2026

Individual

- J.League Best XI: 2023
