= Leo Osaki =

Japanese soccer player (born 1991)

Leo Osaki 大﨑 玲央
Personal information
- Full name: Leo Hirayama Osaki
- Date of birth: 8 July 1991 (age 35)
- Place of birth: Tokyo, Japan
- Height: 1.87 m (6 ft 2 in)
- Positions: Centre back; defensive midfielder

Team information
- Current team: Hokkaido Consadole Sapporo
- Number: 25

Youth career
- Powder Edge SC
- Yokohama F. Marinos
- Yokohama FC

College career
Years	Team	Apps	(Gls)
2009–2013	Toin University of Yokohama		

Senior career*
Years	Team	Apps	(Gls)
2014–2015	Carolina RailHawks	29	(3)
2016	Yokohama FC	31	(1)
2017–2018	Tokushima Vortis	44	(0)
2018–2023	Vissel Kobe	129	(2)
2024	Emirates	0	(0)
2024–	Hokkaido Consadole Sapporo	39	(0)
- * Club domestic league appearances and goals as of 13 August 2026

Leo Osaki (大﨑 玲央, Ōsaki Reo; born 8 July 1991) is a Japanese soccer player who plays as a centre back and sometime defensive midfielder. He currently plays for the J1 League club, Hokkaido Consadole Sapporo.

== Career ==
Osaki signed with Carolina RailHawks in July 2014, making his professional debut on July 13, 2014, in a 1–2 loss against Indy Eleven.

He later signed with Yokohama FC for the 2016 J2 League season, making his first appearance as a substitute in a 2–0 win against Renofa Yamaguchi FC on March 20, 2016.

On 27 December 2023, Osaki announced that he would transfer to the UAE club, Emirates for the mid 2023–24 season after leaving Vissel Kobe after 6 years at the club.

== Club statistics ==
Updated to the end of season 2023.

Club performance			League		Cup		League Cup		Continental		Other		Total	
Season	Club	League	Apps	Goals	Apps	Goals	Apps	Goals	Apps	Goals	Apps	Goals	Apps	Goals
USA			League		US Open Cup								Total	
2014-2015	Carolina RailHawks	NASL	29	3	–		–		–		–		29	3
Japan			League		Emperor's Cup		J.League Cup		Asia		Other		Total	
2016	Yokohama FC	J2 League	31	1	3	0	–		–		–		34	1
2017	Tokushima Vortis	J2 League	27	0	0	0	–		–		–		27	0
2018	Tokushima Vortis	J2 League	17	0	1	0	–		–		–		18	0
2018	Vissel Kobe	J1 League	17	0	0	0	0	0	–		–		17	0
2019	Vissel Kobe	J1 League	31	1	6	0	3	0	–		–		40	1
2020	Vissel Kobe	J1 League	24	0	–		1	0	3	0	1	0	29	0
2021	Vissel Kobe	J1 League	11	1	0	0	7	0	–		–		18	1
2022	Vissel Kobe	J1 League	25	0	0	0	2	0	6	1	–		33	1
2023	Vissel Kobe	J1 League	21	0	0	0	3	0	0	0	–		24	0
UAE			League		President's Cup		League Cup		Asia		Other		Total	
2023–24	Emirates	UAE Pro League	0	0	0	0	0	0	–		–		0	0
Total			233	6	10	0	16	0	9	1	1	0	269	7

== Honours ==
Vissel Kobe

- J1 League: 2023
- Emperor's Cup: 2019
- Japanese Super Cup: 2020
