= Kyōgo Furuhashi =

Japanese footballer (born 1995)

Kyōgo Furuhashi 古橋 亨梧
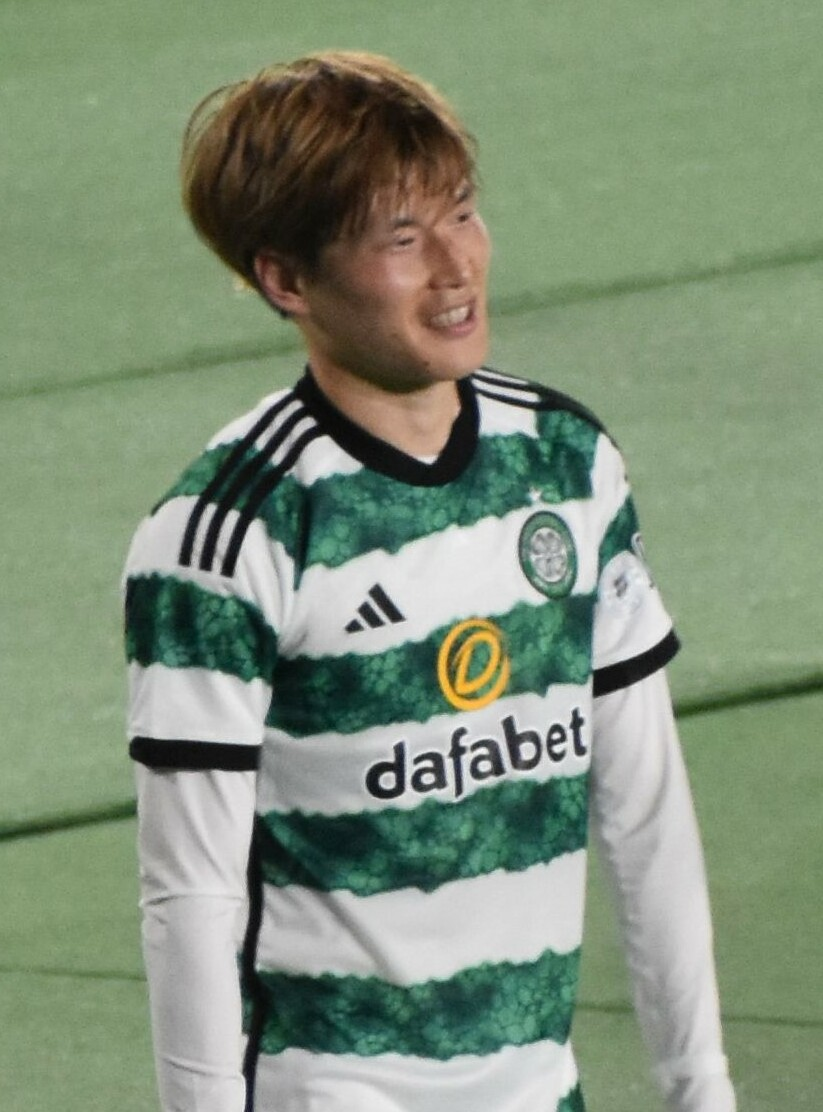
- Furuhashi with Celtic in 2023

Personal information
- Date of birth: 20 January 1995 (age 31)
- Place of birth: Ikoma, Nara, Japan
- Height: 1.70 m (5 ft 7 in)
- Position: Forward

Team information
- Current team: LA Galaxy
- Number: 7

Youth career
- Sakuragaoka
- Athpegas Ikoma
- 2010–2012: Kokoku High School

College career
Years	Team	Apps	(Gls)
2013–2016	Chuo University		

Senior career*
Years	Team	Apps	(Gls)
2017–2018	Gifu	68	(17)
2018–2021	Vissel Kobe	95	(42)
2021–2025	Celtic	116	(63)
2025	Rennes	6	(0)
2025–2026	Birmingham City	28	(1)
2026–	LA Galaxy	12	(0)

International career^{‡}
2019–2025	Japan	23	(5)
- * Club domestic league appearances and goals as of 7 November 2026 (UTC) ‡ National team caps and goals as of 25 March 2025 (UTC)

Kyōgo Furuhashi (古橋 亨梧, Furuhashi Kyōgo; born 20 January 1995), often known mononymously as Kyōgo, is a Japanese professional footballer who plays as a striker for Major League Soccer club LA Galaxy.

== Club career ==
=== Gifu ===
Kyōgo Furuhashi joined J2 League club Gifu in 2017.

=== Vissel Kobe ===
On 1 August 2018, it was confirmed that Furuhashi would join the J1 League club Vissel Kobe for the rest of the 2018 season.

In the club's Emperor's Cup semi-final match against Shimizu S-Pulse on 21 December 2019, Furuhashi scored Vissel's third goal to seal a 3–1 victory and a spot in their first ever major cup final. Vissel would go on to defeat Kashima Antlers in the final on 1 January 2020.

Furuhashi scored Vissel Kobe's second goal in their 2020 Japanese Super Cup victory over Yokohama F. Marinos on 8 February 2020. Four days later in Vissel Kobe's first ever match in a continental competition against Malaysia Super League champions JDT, Furuhashi scored again in a 5–1 victory. Furuhashi netted the lone goal in the second group stage match against Suwon Samsung Bluewings on 19 February.

=== Celtic ===
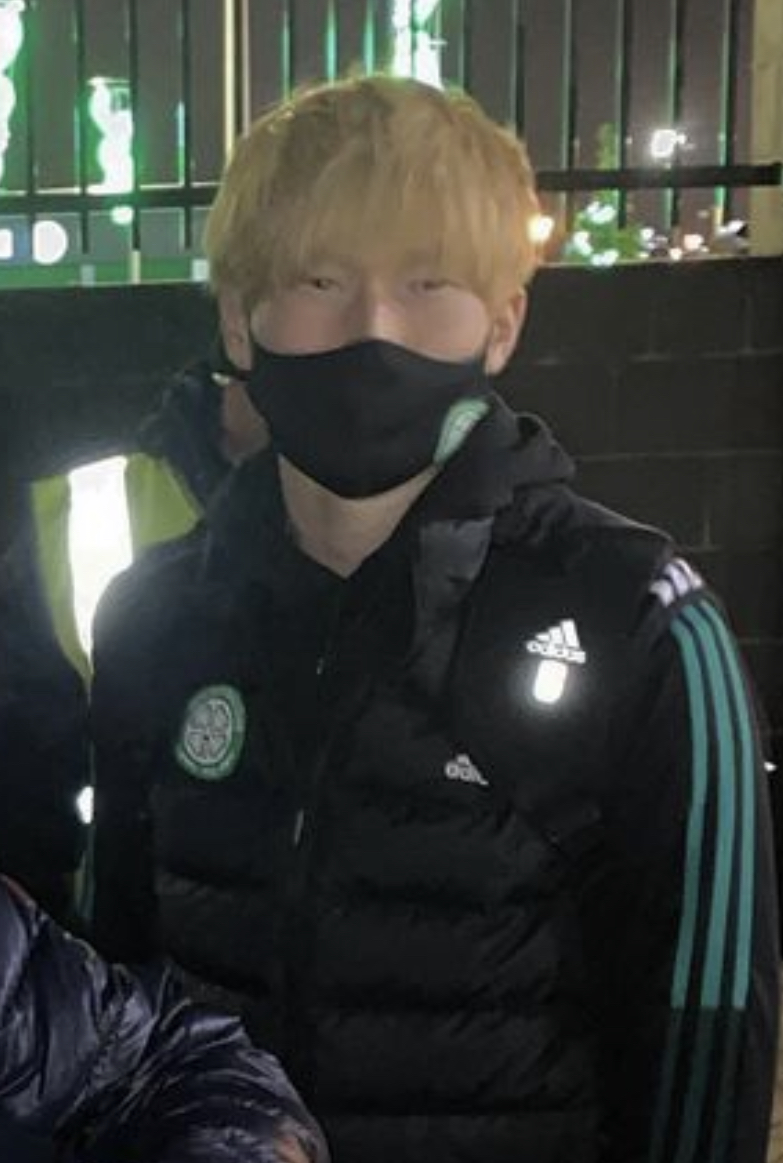
Furuhashi in 2021.

==== 2021–22 season ====
On 16 July 2021, Furuhashi joined Scottish Premiership side Celtic for £4.5 million, signing a four-year deal. He scored his first goal for the club on his first start against Jablonec in the UEFA Europa League third qualifying round on 5 August 2021. Three days later, Furuhashi scored his first Scottish Premiership goals, netting a 67-minute hat-trick in a 6–0 win against Dundee. He followed up his excellent run of form by scoring against Hearts, and again in the UEFA Europa League against AZ.

Furuhashi picked up an injury while on international duty with Japan in September, but returned after five games, scoring on 3 October in a 2–1 victory against Aberdeen, and netting the only goal of the game in a home league win against Hearts on 2 December. On 19 December 2021, Furuhashi scored twice against Hibernian in the final of the Scottish League Cup. The game ended 2–1, winning Furuhashi his first trophy with Celtic.

==== 2022–23 season ====
On 28 August 2022, Furuhashi scored a hat-trick in a 9–0 away win against Dundee United. A month later, Furuhashi made his UEFA Champions League debut in a 3–0 home defeat against Real Madrid.

On 2 January 2023, Furuhashi scored his first derby goal against Rangers to salvage a 2–2 away draw. On 26 February, Furuhashi scored a second consecutive League Cup final double, now against Rangers in the 2023 Scottish League Cup Final. On 7 May, Furuhashi scored his 50th goal for Celtic in all competitions in a 2–0 away win against Hearts. On 2 June, Furuhashi won the Scottish Premiership Golden Boot award, after scoring 27 goals for Celtic over the course of the season. He also won the league's player of the year award.

==== 2023–24 season ====
In July 2023, he signed a new four-year contract with Celtic. Later that year, on 3 September, Furuhashi scored his sixth derby goal against Rangers in a 1–0 away win at Ibrox Stadium. On 5 October 2023, he scored his first goal in the Champions League against Lazio in the group stage of the UEFA Champions League. On 26 October, he also scored the opening goal in the third match against Atlético Madrid, and on 30 December, he scored a wonder goal to help Celtic win 2–1 against Rangers.

==== 2024–25 season ====
On 1 September 2024, Furuhashi scored his eighth derby goal against Rangers in eleven games, in a 3–0 win at home. On December 15, he won his third Scottish League Cup title with Celtic, after they beat Rangers on penalties after the game finished level at 3–3 at Hampden Park.

On 22 January 2025, Furuhashi played his last match for Celtic against Swiss side Young Boys in a Champions League league phase match where he had three goals disallowed.

=== Rennes ===
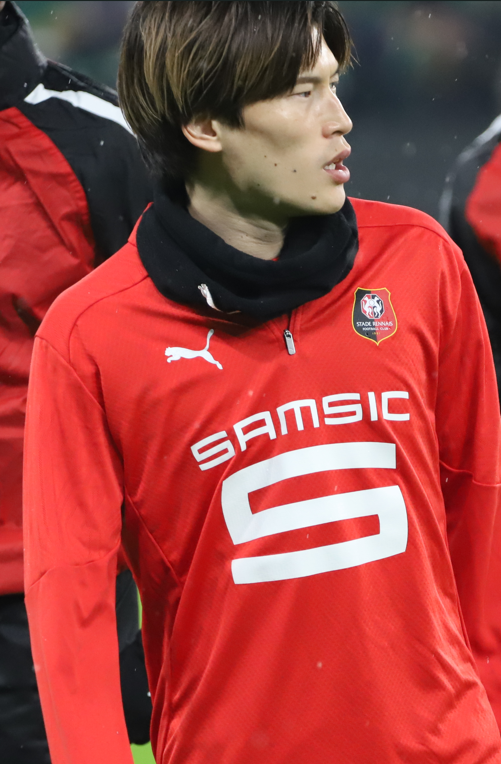
Furuhashi with Rennes in 2025.

On 27 January 2025, Furuhashi signed a two-and-a-half-year contract with Ligue 1 club Rennes, for a reported fee of £10 million. His playing time was limited at the club, only playing in six games, comprising two hours of actual playing time and scoring no goals.

=== Birmingham City ===
On 5 July 2025, Furuhashi signed for EFL Championship club Birmingham City for an undisclosed fee on a three year deal. On 8 August, he made his debut for the club in a 1–1 draw against Ipswich Town in the league.

=== LA Galaxy ===
On 21 July 2026, Furuhashi signed for Major League Soccer side LA Galaxy on a five-year deal.

== International career ==
Furuhashi earned his first Japan call-up against Venezuela on 19 November 2019 for the Kirin Cup. He made his debut as in their 1–4 home defeat at the Panasonic Stadium Suita.

Despite his form at Celtic, Furuhashi was not included in the Japan squad for the 2022 FIFA World Cup in Qatar. This came as a surprise to many supporters and media outlets at the time, where Japan manager Hajime Moriyasu justified his decision by saying: "We selected players who will be on the same wavelength as a team, who will be able to move and link up together, who through their organisation will be able to make use of their individual strengths".

Furuhashi was also excluded from the Japanese squad for the 2024 AFC Asian Cup. Moriyasu said: "It was extremely difficult [to leave Furuhashi out]. It's just really painful to make decisions like these [...] Regarding the criteria for this tournament, I went for the ones I thought had the most individual strength. I wanted players who can overcome situations individually and have to have the ability to connect with people and work together with those around them. We picked players who can improve their abilities not only by themselves, but also by working with their team-mates."

On 7 November 2024, Kyōgo was finally called up again for the 2026 FIFA World Cup qualifiers, joined by Celtic teammates Daizen Maeda and Reo Hatate.

== Career statistics ==
=== Club ===
As of match played 7 November 2026

Appearances and goals by club, season and competition
Club	Season	League			National cup (Note: Includes Emperor's Cup, Scottish Cup)		League cup (Note: Includes J.League Cup, Scottish League Cup, EFL Cup)		Continental		Other		Total	
Club	Season	Division	Apps	Goals	Apps	Goals	Apps	Goals	Apps	Goals	Apps	Goals	Apps	Goals
Gifu	2017	J2 League	42	6	2	0	—		—		—		44	6
Gifu	2018	J2 League	26	11	1	0	—		—		—		27	11
Gifu	Total		68	17	3	0	—		—		—		71	17
Vissel Kobe	2018	J1 League	13	5	0	0	0	0	—		—		13	5
Vissel Kobe	2019	J1 League	31	10	4	2	1	0	—		—		36	12
Vissel Kobe	2020	J1 League	30	12	—		1	0	8 (Note: Appearances in AFC Champions League)	4	1 (Note: Appearance in Japanese Super Cup)	1	40	17
Vissel Kobe	2021	J1 League	21	15	1	1	0	0	—		—		22	16
Vissel Kobe	Total		95	42	5	3	2	0	8	4	1	1	111	50
Celtic	2021–22	Scottish Premiership	20	12	1	0	3	3	9 (Note: Appearances in UEFA Europa League)	5	—		33	20
Celtic	2022–23	Scottish Premiership	36	27	5	4	3	3	6 (Note: Appearances in UEFA Champions League)	0	—		50	34
Celtic	2023–24	Scottish Premiership	38	14	5	3	1	0	6	2	—		50	19
Celtic	2024–25	Scottish Premiership	22	10	1	0	2	1	7	1	—		32	12
Celtic	Total		116	63	12	7	9	7	28	8	—		165	85
Rennes	2024–25	Ligue 1	6	0	—		—		—		—		6	0
Birmingham City	2025–26	Championship	28	1	1	1	2	1	—		—		31	3
LA Galaxy	2026	MLS	12	0	—		—		—		—		12	0
Career total			325	123	21	11	13	8	36	12	1	1	396	155

=== International ===
As of match played 25 March 2025

Appearances and goals by national team and year
National team	Year	Apps	Goals
Japan	2019	1	0
Japan	2021	11	3
Japan	2022	4	0
Japan	2023	5	2
Japan	2024	1	0
Japan	2025	1	0
Total		23	5

Scores and results list Japan's goal tally first, score column indicates score after each Furuhashi goal.

List of international goals scored by Kyōgo Furuhashi
No.	Date	Venue	Opponent	Score	Result	Competition
1	30 March 2021	Fukuda Denshi Arena, Chiba, Japan	Mongolia	10–0	14–0	2022 FIFA World Cup qualification
2	30 March 2021	Fukuda Denshi Arena, Chiba, Japan	Mongolia	11–0	14–0	2022 FIFA World Cup qualification
3	7 June 2021	Panasonic Stadium Suita, Suita, Japan	Tajikistan	1–0	4–1	2022 FIFA World Cup qualification
4	15 June 2023	Toyota Stadium, Toyota, Japan	El Salvador	6–0	6–0	2023 Kirin Challenge Cup
5	17 October 2023	Noevir Stadium Kobe, Kobe, Japan	Tunisia	1–0	2–0	2023 Kirin Challenge Cup

== Honours ==
Vissel Kobe

- Emperor's Cup: 2019
- Japanese Super Cup: 2020

Celtic

- Scottish Premiership: 2021–22, 2022–23, 2023–24, 2024–25
- Scottish Cup: 2022–23, 2023–24
- Scottish League Cup: 2021–22, 2022–23, 2024–25

Individual

- PFA Scotland Team of the Year (Premiership): 2021–22, 2022–23
- Scottish Premiership top scorer: 2022–23
- PFA Scotland Players' Player of the Year: 2022–23
- SFWA Footballer of the Year: 2022–23
- Celtic Player of the Year: 2022–23
- Celtic Goal of the Year: 2021–22, 2023–24
- Japan Pro-Footballers Association Best XI: 2022, 2023, 2024
