= Keijiro Ogawa =

Japanese footballer (born 1992)

Keijiro Ogawa 小川 慶治朗
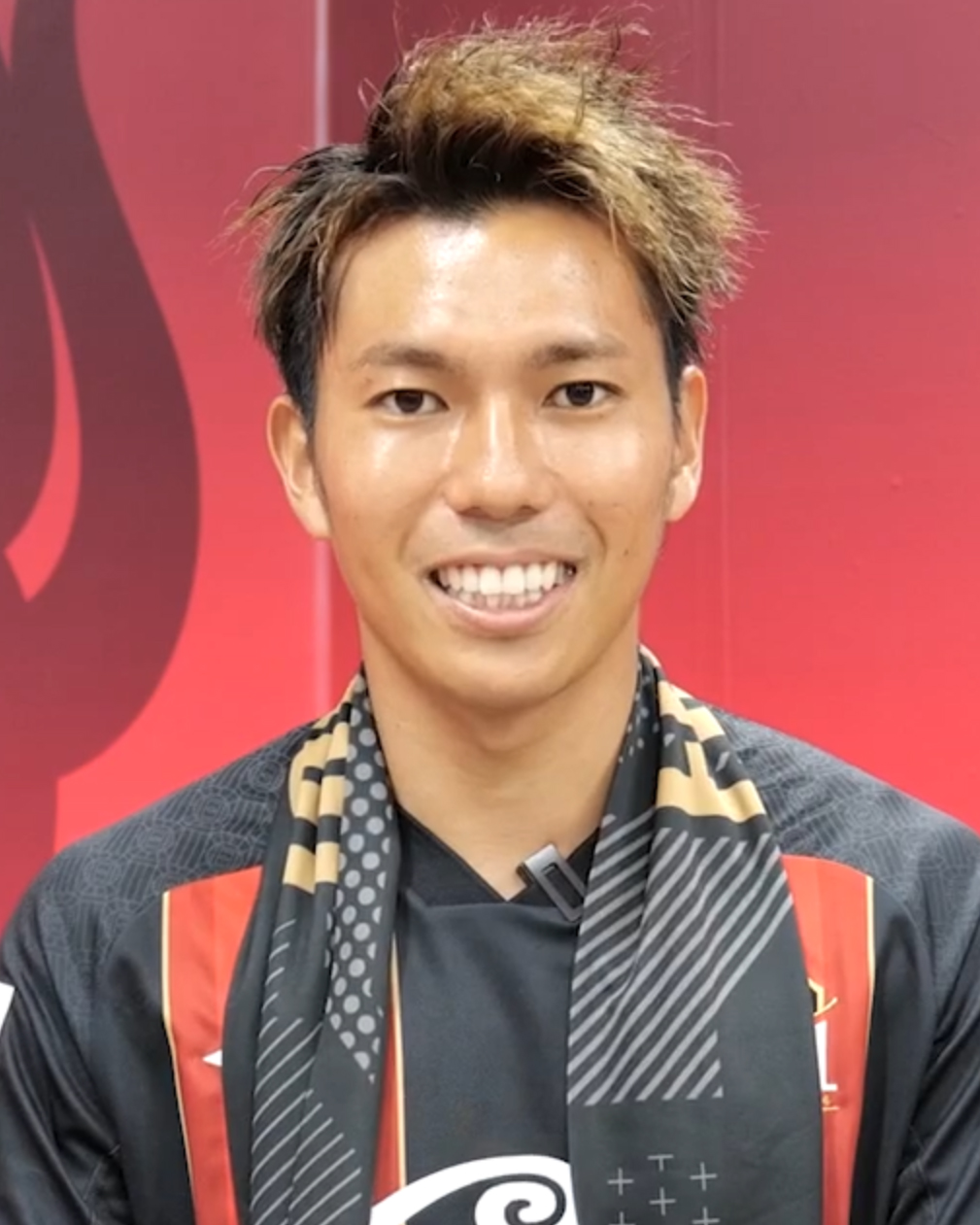
- Ogawa with FC Seoul in 2022

Personal information
- Full name: Keijiro Ogawa
- Date of birth: 14 July 1992 (age 34)
- Place of birth: Sanda, Hyōgo, Japan
- Height: 1.68 m (5 ft 6 in)
- Position: Forward

Team information
- Current team: Kataller Toyama
- Number: 13

Youth career
- 1999–2004: Woody FC
- 2005–2010: Vissel Kobe

Senior career*
Years	Team	Apps	(Gls)
2010–2020	Vissel Kobe	228	(45)
2018	→ Shonan Bellmare (loan)	13	(0)
2021–2025	Yokohama FC	91	(8)
2021–2022	→ Western Sydney Wanderers (loan)	26	(2)
2022	→ FC Seoul (loan)	12	(0)
2025–	Kataller Toyama	29	(2)

International career
2009	Japan U-17	2	(0)
Medal record
Shonan Bellmare
Winner	J.League Cup	2018
- * Club domestic league appearances and goals as of 16 August 2026

Keijiro Ogawa (小川 慶治朗, born 14 July 1992) is a Japanese football player for Kataller Toyama.

== Club career ==
On 13 July 2022, he signed with FC Seoul, on loan from Yokohama FC. He left the club at the end of the season.

== International career ==
In October 2009, Ogawa was elected Japan U-17 national team for 2009 U-17 World Cup. He played 2 matches as substitutes.

== Career statistics ==
=== Club ===
Updated to 12 October 2022.

Club	Season	League			Cup^{1}		League Cup^{2}		Continental		Other		Total	
Club	Season	Division	Apps	Goals	Apps	Goals	Apps	Goals	Apps	Goals	Apps	Goals	Apps	Goals
Vissel Kobe	2010	J1 League	15	2	0	0	0	0	–		–		15	2
Vissel Kobe	2011	J1 League	12	0	0	0	1	0	–		–		13	0
Vissel Kobe	2012	J1 League	28	9	1	0	6	0	–		–		35	9
Vissel Kobe	2013	J2 League	39	16	1	0	–		–		–		40	16
Vissel Kobe	2014	J1 League	26	5	1	0	5	0	–		–		32	5
Vissel Kobe	2015	J1 League	19	4	0	0	7	0	–		–		26	4
Vissel Kobe	2016	J1 League	7	1	0	0	2	0	–		–		9	1
Vissel Kobe	2017	J1 League	25	2	4	0	4	0	–		–		33	2
Vissel Kobe	2018	J1 League	5	0	0	0	7	0	–		–		12	0
Vissel Kobe	2019	J1 League	25	5	5	3	5	0	–		–		35	8
Vissel Kobe	2020	J1 League	27	1	–		1	0	4	3	1	0	33	4
Vissel Kobe	Total		228	45	13	4	38	0	4	3	1	0	283	51
Shonan Bellmare (loan)	2018	J1 League	13	0	1	1	0	0	–		–		14	1
Yokohama FC	2021	J1 League	23	1	1	0	3	0	–		–		27	1
Yokohama FC	2023	J1 League	0	0	0	0	0	0	–		–		0	0
Yokohama FC	Total		23	1	1	0	3	0	0	0	0	0	27	1
Western Sydney Wanderers (loan)	2021–22	A-League Men	26	2	2	0	–		–		–		28	2
FC Seoul (loan)	2022	K League 1	12	0	0	0	–		–		–		12	0
Career Total			302	48	15	3	41	0	4	3	1	0	364	55

^{1}Includes Emperor's Cup.

^{2}Includes J. League Cup.

== Honours ==
Vissel Kobe

- Emperor's Cup: 2019
- Japanese Super Cup: 2020
