= Douglas (footballer, born 1987) =

Brazilian footballer

Personal information
- Full name: Dyanfres Douglas Chagas Matos
- Date of birth: 30 December 1987 (age 38)
- Place of birth: Morros, Brazil
- Height: 1.84 m (6 ft 0 in)
- Position: Forward

Senior career*
| Years | Team | Apps | (Gls) |
| 2006–2008 | Moto Club | 13 | (11) |
| 2008 | → Madureira (loan) | 0 | (0) |
| 2009–2013 | Tombense | 0 | (0) |
| 2009–2010 | → Figueirense (loan) | 10 | (1) |
| 2010–2013 | → Tokushima Vortis (loan) | 92 | (24) |
| 2014–2015 | Tokushima Vortis | 13 | (0) |
| 2014 | → Kyoto Sanga (loan) | 17 | (5) |
| 2015 | → Sanfrecce Hiroshima (loan) | 33 | (21) |
| 2016–2018 | Al Ain FC | 30 | (19) |
| 2018 | Alanyaspor | 14 | (5) |
| 2018–2019 | Shimizu S-Pulse | 45 | (25) |
| 2020–2022 | Vissel Kobe | 44 | (14) |
| 2022–2023 | Kashiwa Reysol | 17 | (4) |
| Total | | 328 | (129) |
- * Club domestic league appearances and goals

Dyanfres Douglas Chagas Matos (born 30 December 1987), or simply Douglas, is a Brazilian former professional footballer who played as a forward. He spent the majority of his playing career in Japan, playing at six different clubs.

== Career ==
Douglas signed for Tokushima Vortis in July 2010. He made his J2 League debut on 25 July 2010 against Tokyo Verdy. He scored his first goal for the club on 22 August 2010 against Giravanz Kitakyushu. In 2015, he was loaned to J1 League side Sanfrecce Hiroshima. He was named in the 2015 J.League Best XI. In 2016, Douglas moved to UAE and signed for Al Ain FC.

== Career statistics ==
Appearances and goals by club, season and competition
| Club | Season | League | | | State league (Note: Includes Campeonato Maranhense, Campeonato Catarinense) | | National cup (Note: Includes Copa do Brasil, Emperor's Cup) | | League cup (Note: Includes J.League Cup, UAE League Cup) | | Continental (Note: Includes AFC Champions Leaague) | | Other | | Total | |
| Club | Season | Division | Apps | Goals | Apps | Goals | Apps | Goals | Apps | Goals | Apps | Goals | Apps | Goals | Apps | Goals |
|---|---|---|---|---|---|---|---|---|---|---|---|---|---|---|---|---|
| Moto Club | 2006 | Maranhense | — | | 0 | 0 | 0 | 0 | — | | — | | 0 | 0 | 0 | 0 |
| Moto Club | 2007 | Maranhense | — | | 3 | 3 | 1 | 1 | — | | — | | 8 (Note: Appearances in Maranhense Football Federation Cup (Copa FMF)) | 12 | 12 | 16 |
| Moto Club | 2008 | Maranhense | — | | 10 | 8 | 0 | 0 | — | | — | | — | | 10 | 8 |
| Moto Club | Total | | 0 | 0 | 13 | 11 | 1 | 1 | — | | — | | 8 | 12 | 22 | 24 |
| Madureira (loan) | 2008 | Carioca | — | | 0 | 0 | 3 | 0 | — | | — | | — | | 3 | 0 |
| Figueirense (loan) | 2009 | Série B | 7 | 1 | 0 | 0 | 1 | 1 | — | | — | | — | | 8 | 2 |
| Figueirense (loan) | 2010 | Série B | 1 | 0 | 2 | 0 | 0 | 0 | — | | — | | — | | 3 | 0 |
| Figueirense (loan) | Total | | 8 | 1 | 2 | 0 | 1 | 1 | — | | — | | — | | 11 | 2 |
| Tokushima Vortis (loan) | 2010 | J.League Division 2 | 13 | 4 | — | | 2 | 0 | — | | — | | — | | 15 | 4 |
| Tokushima Vortis (loan) | 2011 | J.League Division 2 | 22 | 4 | — | | 0 | 0 | — | | — | | — | | 22 | 4 |
| Tokushima Vortis (loan) | 2012 | J.League Division 2 | 28 | 4 | — | | 1 | 1 | — | | — | | — | | 29 | 4 |
| Tokushima Vortis (loan) | 2013 | J.League Division 2 | 29 | 12 | — | | 1 | 1 | — | | — | | 2 (Note: Appearances in the J1/J2 promotion play-offs) | 1 | 32 | 14 |
| Tokushima Vortis (loan) | Total | | 92 | 24 | — | | 4 | 2 | — | | — | | 2 | 1 | 98 | 26 |
| Tokushima Vortis | 2014 | J.League Division 1 | 13 | 0 | — | | 1 | 1 | 2 | 2 | — | | — | | 16 | 3 |
| Kyoto Sanga (loan) | 2014 | J.League Division 2 | 17 | 5 | — | | 0 | 0 | — | | — | | — | | 17 | 5 |
| Sanfrecce Hiroshima (loan) | 2015 | J1 League | 33 | 21 | — | | 3 | 1 | 3 | 0 | — | | 6 (Note: 4 appearances, 2 goals in the FIFA Club World Cup) (Note: 2 appearances, 1 goal in the J.League Championship) | 3 | 45 | 25 |
| Al Ain FC | 2015–16 | UAE Pro League | 10 | 9 | — | | 0 | 0 | — | | — | | — | | 10 | 9 |
| Al Ain FC | 2016–17 | UAE Pro League | 12 | 6 | — | | 0 | 0 | 5 | 4 | 14 | 5 | — | | 31 | 15 |
| Al Ain FC | 2017–18 | UAE Pro League | 8 | 4 | — | | 0 | 0 | 5 | 5 | 2 | 0 | — | | 15 | 9 |
| Al Ain FC | Total | | 30 | 19 | — | | 0 | 0 | 10 | 9 | 16 | 5 | — | | 56 | 33 |
| Alanyaspor | 2017–18 | Süper Lig | 14 | 5 | — | | 0 | 0 | — | | — | | — | | 14 | 5 |
| Shimizu S-Pulse | 2018 | J1 League | 15 | 11 | — | | 0 | 0 | 0 | 0 | — | | — | | 15 | 11 |
| Shimizu S-Pulse | 2019 | J1 League | 30 | 14 | — | | 4 | 0 | 2 | 1 | — | | — | | 36 | 15 |
| Shimizu S-Pulse | Total | | 45 | 25 | — | | 4 | 0 | 2 | 1 | — | | — | | 51 | 26 |
| Vissel Kobe | 2020 | J1 League | 23 | 7 | — | | 0 | 0 | 0 | 0 | 7 (Note: Douglas played and scored in a 5–1 victory, but due to Johor Darul Ta'zim withdrawing from the competition, all previous matches played by them were considered "null and void".) | 1 | 1 (Note: Appearance in the Japanese Super Cup) | 1 | 31 | 9 |
| Vissel Kobe | 2021 | J1 League | 21 | 7 | — | | 2 | 0 | 3 | 2 | — | | — | | 26 | 9 |
| Vissel Kobe | Total | | 44 | 14 | — | | 2 | 0 | 3 | 2 | 7 | 1 | 1 | 1 | 57 | 18 |
| Kashiwa Reysol | 2022 | J1 League | 10 | 4 | — | | 0 | 0 | 1 | 0 | — | | — | | 11 | 4 |
| Kashiwa Reysol | 2023 | J1 League | 7 | 0 | — | | 1 | 0 | 1 | 0 | — | | — | | 9 | 0 |
| Kashiwa Reysol | Total | | 17 | 4 | — | | 1 | 0 | 2 | 0 | — | | — | | 20 | 4 |
| Career total | | | 313 | 118 | 15 | 11 | 20 | 6 | 22 | 14 | 23 | 6 | 17 | 17 | 410 | 171 |

== Honours ==
Sanfrecce Hiroshima

- J1 League: 2015

Al Ain

- UAE Pro League: 2017–18
- UAE President's Cup: 2017–18

Vissel Kobe

- Japanese Super Cup: 2020

Individual

- Fans' Asian Champions League XI: 2016
- J.League Best XI: 2015
