= Sergi Samper =

Spanish footballer (born 1995)

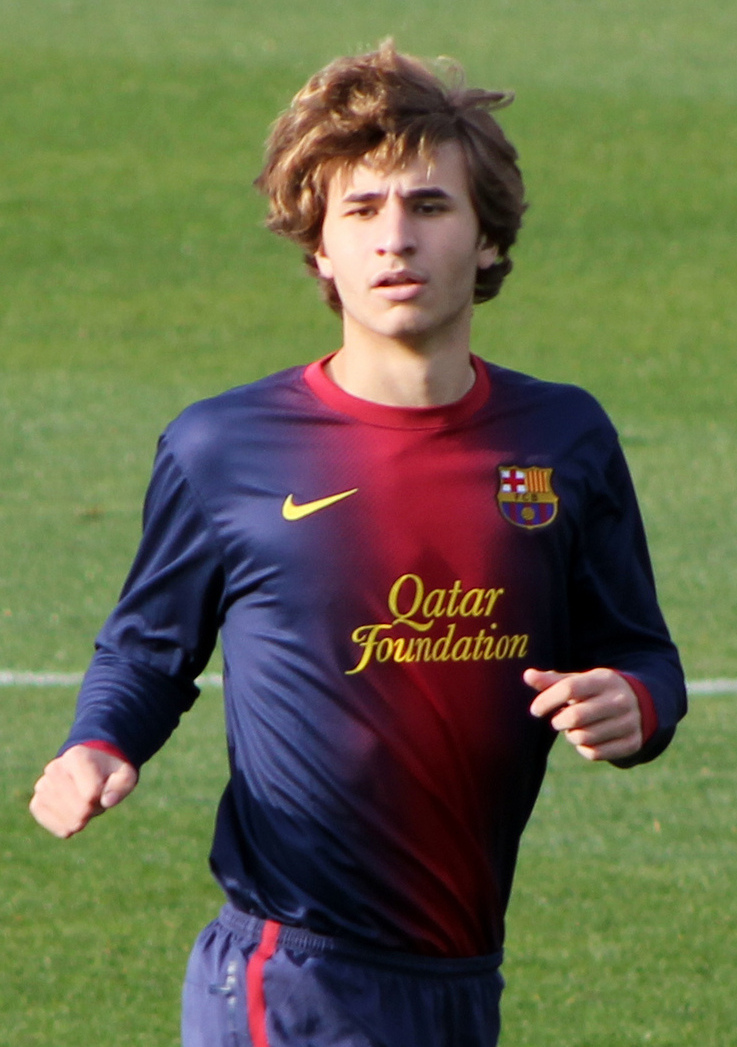
- Samper with Barcelona Juvenil in 2012

Personal information
- Full name: Sergi Samper Montaña
- Date of birth: 20 January 1995 (age 31)
- Place of birth: Barcelona, Spain
- Height: 1.81 m (5 ft 11 in)
- Position: Defensive midfielder

Team information
- Current team: Debreceni
- Number: 16

Youth career
- 2001–2013: Barcelona

Senior career*
Years	Team	Apps	(Gls)
2013–2016	Barcelona B	103	(0)
2014–2019	Barcelona	1	(0)
2016–2017	→ Granada (loan)	22	(0)
2017–2018	→ Las Palmas (loan)	2	(0)
2019–2023	Vissel Kobe	88	(0)
2023–2024	Andorra	19	(1)
2024–2026	Motor Lublin	53	(0)
2026–	Debreceni	3	(0)

International career
2011	Spain U16	6	(0)
2011–2012	Spain U17	8	(2)
2013	Spain U18	2	(0)
2013–2014	Spain U19	4	(1)
2014–2016	Spain U21	3	(0)
2015–2018	Catalonia	2	(0)
- * Club domestic league appearances and goals as of 12:00, 29 October 2026 (UTC)

Sergi Samper Montaña (born 20 January 1995) is a Spanish professional footballer who plays as a defensive midfielder for Nemzeti Bajnokság I club Debreceni.

Brought up at Barcelona from the age of six, he featured mainly for the reserve team and made 13 first-team appearances, of which only one in La Liga, where he played 22 further games for Granada and Las Palmas while on loan. In 2019, he moved to Japanese club Vissel Kobe, totalling 107 matches and winning the Emperor's Cup in his first year. He also played for Andorra in the Segunda División, and Motor Lublin in the Polish Ekstraklasa.

== Club career ==
=== Barcelona ===
Born in Barcelona, Catalonia, Samper joined FC Barcelona's youth setup in 2001 at age 6, after a successful trial. On 9 May 2013, he signed a four-year professional contract.

On 10 June 2013, Samper was promoted to the reserves who competed in the Segunda División. He made his professional debut on 17 August in a 2–1 away defeat against CD Mirandés, appearing in a further 39 matches during the season to help to a third-place finish.

Samper made his first-team debut on 17 September 2014, starting in a 1–0 home victory over APOEL FC in the group stage of the UEFA Champions League; this made him the first player to rise through all of the ranks from the age of six. His first match in La Liga took place the following 12 March, when he came on as a 59th-minute substitute for Andrés Iniesta in the 6–0 home rout of Getafe CF.

In July 2016, Samper extended his contract until 2019 with a one-year further option and a buyout clause of €50 million, and in the following month he joined Granada CF on a season-long loan. After the Andalusians relegation, he was not issued a squad number in August 2017 by Barcelona manager Ernesto Valverde and was sent to UD Las Palmas on another temporary deal. The spell was cut short in January 2019 after a fibula fracture and left-ankle internal ligament break.

=== Vissel Kobe ===
On 4 March 2019, Samper terminated his contract with Barcelona and left the Camp Nou after 18 years. Three days later, he joined J1 League club Vissel Kobe on a four-year deal.

Playing alongside former Barcelona players Iniesta and David Villa, Samper won the Emperor's Cup in his first year in Japan, but was absent from the final win over Kashima Antlers. The following 8 February he started in the Super Cup, a penalty shootout defeat of Yokohama F. Marinos after a 3–3 draw.

=== Andorra ===
Samper returned to the Spanish second division on 28 July 2023, after agreeing to a two-year contract with FC Andorra. As the campaign ended in relegation, he scored his only goal on 3 December to help the hosts beat SD Huesca 1–0 through a close-range header in the 90th minute.

=== Motor Lublin ===
On 1 August 2024, Samper joined Polish Ekstraklasa club Motor Lublin on a one-year deal. He made his debut one month later, featuring 45 minutes of the 5–2 away loss against Legia Warsaw after replacing Mathieu Scalet.

Samper agreed to a one-year extension in June 2025.

=== Later career ===
On 27 June 2026, Samper signed an initial one-year contract at Hungarian Nemzeti Bajnokság I side Debreceni VSC.

== International career ==
Samper won his first cap for the Spain under-21 team on 12 November 2014 at the age of 19, playing the entire 4–1 friendly home loss to Belgium.

== Personal life ==
Samper's older brother Jordi is a professional tennis player. He played the game himself, until choosing football at six.

Samper has type 1 diabetes, and befriended Borja Mayoral, who shares his condition, in the Spanish youth teams.

== Career statistics ==
As of match played 23 May 2026

Appearances and goals by club, season and competition
Club	Season	League			National cup (Note: Includes Copa del Rey, Emperor's Cup, Polish Cup)		League cup (Note: Includes J.League Cup)		Continental		Other		Total	
Club	Season	Division	Apps	Goals	Apps	Goals	Apps	Goals	Apps	Goals	Apps	Goals	Apps	Goals
Barcelona B	2013–14	Segunda División	40	0	—		—		—		—		40	0
Barcelona B	2014–15	Segunda División	34	0	—		—		—		—		34	0
Barcelona B	2015–16	Segunda División B	29	0	—		—		—		—		29	0
Barcelona B	Total		103	0	—		—		—		—		103	0
Barcelona	2014–15	La Liga	0	0	3	0	—		1 (Note: Appearances in UEFA Champions League)	0	—		4	0
Barcelona	2015–16	La Liga	1	0	3	0	—		2	0	1 (Note: Appearance in FIFA Club World Cup)	0	7	0
Barcelona	2016–17	La Liga	0	0	0	0	—		0	0	1 (Note: Appearance in Supercopa de España)	0	1	0
Barcelona	2018–19	La Liga	0	0	1	0	—		0	0	0	0	1	0
Barcelona	Total		1	0	7	0	0	0	3	0	2	0	13	0
Granada (loan)	2016–17	La Liga	22	0	1	0	—		—		—		23	0
Las Palmas (loan)	2017–18	La Liga	2	0	3	0	—		—		—		5	0
Vissel Kobe	2019	J1 League	24	0	5	1	2	0	—		—		31	1
Vissel Kobe	2020	J1 League	26	0	—		1	0	0	0	1 (Note: Appearance in Japanese Super Cup)	0	28	0
Vissel Kobe	2021	J1 League	32	0	2	0	3	0	—		—		37	0
Vissel Kobe	2022	J1 League	6	0	0	0	0	0	1 (Note: Appearance in AFC Champions League)	0	—		7	0
Vissel Kobe	2023	J1 League	0	0	1	0	3	0	—		—		4	0
Vissel Kobe	Total		88	0	8	1	9	0	1	0	1	0	107	1
Andorra	2023–24	Segunda División	19	1	0	0	—		—		—		19	1
Motor Lublin	2024–25	Ekstraklasa	25	0	0	0	—		—		—		25	0
Motor Lublin	2025–26	Ekstraklasa	28	0	1	0	—		—		—		29	0
Motor Lublin	Total		53	0	1	0	—		—		—		54	0
Debrecen	2026–27	Nemzeti Bajnokság I	0	0	0	0	—		0	0	—		0	0
Career total			288	1	20	1	9	0	4	0	3	0	349	2

== Honours ==
Barcelona

- La Liga: 2015–16
- Copa del Rey: 2014–15, 2015–16
- Supercopa de España: 2016
- UEFA Champions League: 2014–15
- FIFA Club World Cup: 2015

Vissel Kobe

- Emperor's Cup: 2019
- Japanese Super Cup: 2020
