= Hiroki Iikura =

Japanese footballer

Hiroki Iikura 飯倉 大樹
Personal information
- Full name: Hiroki Iikura
- Date of birth: June 1, 1986 (age 40)
- Place of birth: Aomori, Japan
- Height: 1.81 m (5 ft 11 in)
- Position: Goalkeeper

Team information
- Current team: Yokohama F. Marinos
- Number: 21

Youth career
- 1999–2004: Yokohama F. Marinos

Senior career*
| Years | Team | Apps | (Gls) |
| 2005–2019 | Yokohama F. Marinos | 225 | (0) |
| 2006 | → Rosso Kumamoto (loan) | 26 | (0) |
| 2019–2023 | Vissel Kobe | 63 | (0) |
| 2023– | Yokohama F. Marinos | 28 | (0) |
Medal record
Yokohama F. Marinos
| Runner-up | J1 League | 2013 |
| Runner-up | J.League Cup | 2018 |
| Winner | Emperor's Cup | 2013 |
| Runner-up | Emperor's Cup | 2017 |
- * Club domestic league appearances and goals as of 11 August 2026

Hiroki Iikura (Japanese: 飯倉 大樹, born June 1, 1986, in Aomori, Japan) is a Japanese professional footballer who plays as a goalkeeper J1 League club for Yokohama F. Marinos.

== Club statistics ==
As of start of the 2023 season.

Appearances and goals by club, season and competition
| Club performance | | | League | | Cup | | League Cup | | Other | | Total | |
| Season | Club | League | Apps | Goals | Apps | Goals | Apps | Goals | Apps | Goals | Apps | Goals |
| Japan | | | League | | Emperor's Cup | | League Cup | | Other | | Total | |
|---|---|---|---|---|---|---|---|---|---|---|---|---|
| 2005 | Yokohama F. Marinos | J1 | 0 | 0 | 0 | 0 | 0 | 0 | - | | 0 | 0 |
| Total | | | 0 | 0 | 0 | 0 | 0 | 0 | 0 | 0 | 0 | 0 |
| 2006 | Rosso Kumamoto | JFL | 26 | 0 | 2 | 0 | - | | - | | 28 | 0 |
| Total | | | 26 | 0 | 2 | 0 | 0 | 0 | 0 | 0 | 28 | 0 |
| 2007 | Yokohama F. Marinos | J1 | 1 | 0 | 0 | 0 | 0 | 0 | - | | 1 | 0 |
| 2008 | Yokohama F. Marinos | J1 | 0 | 0 | 0 | 0 | 0 | 0 | - | | 0 | 0 |
| 2009 | Yokohama F. Marinos | J1 | 19 | 0 | 2 | 0 | 6 | 0 | - | | 27 | 0 |
| 2010 | Yokohama F. Marinos | J1 | 34 | 0 | 2 | 0 | 5 | 0 | - | | 41 | 0 |
| 2011 | Yokohama F. Marinos | J1 | 33 | 0 | 4 | 0 | 5 | 0 | - | | 42 | 0 |
| 2012 | Yokohama F. Marinos | J1 | 28 | 0 | 3 | 0 | 5 | 0 | - | | 36 | 0 |
| 2013 | Yokohama F. Marinos | J1 | 0 | 0 | 0 | 0 | 0 | 0 | - | | 0 | 0 |
| 2014 | Yokohama F. Marinos | J1 | 0 | 0 | 0 | 0 | 0 | 0 | 0 | 0 | 0 | 0 |
| 2015 | Yokohama F. Marinos | J1 | 25 | 0 | 3 | 0 | 2 | 0 | - | | 30 | 0 |
| 2016 | Yokohama F. Marinos | J1 | 12 | 0 | 2 | 0 | 0 | 0 | - | | 14 | 0 |
| 2017 | Yokohama F. Marinos | J1 | 34 | 0 | 4 | 0 | 0 | 0 | - | | 38 | 0 |
| 2018 | Yokohama F. Marinos | J1 | 34 | 0 | 3 | 0 | 10 | 0 | - | | 47 | 0 |
| 2019 | Yokohama F. Marinos | J1 | 5 | 0 | 0 | 0 | 3 | 0 | - | | 8 | 0 |
| Total | | | 225 | 0 | 23 | 0 | 36 | 0 | 0 | 0 | 284 | 0 |
| 2019 | Vissel Kobe | J1 | 12 | 0 | 5 | 0 | 0 | 0 | - | | 17 | 0 |
| 2020 | Vissel Kobe | J1 | 18 | 0 | 0 | 0 | 1 | 0 | 3 (Note: Appearance in the Japanese Super Cup) (Note: Appearances in the AFC Champions League) | 0 | 22 | 0 |
| 2021 | Vissel Kobe | J1 | 19 | 0 | 2 | 0 | 3 | 0 | - | | 24 | 0 |
| 2022 | Vissel Kobe | J1 | 14 | 0 | 4 | 0 | 1 | 0 | 1 | 0 | 20 | 0 |
| Total | | | 63 | 0 | 12 | 0 | 5 | 0 | 3 | 0 | 83 | 0 |
| 2023 | Yokohama F. Marinos | J1 | 0 | 0 | 0 | 0 | 0 | 0 | 0 | 0 | 0 | 0 |
| Career total | | | 314 | 0 | 37 | 0 | 41 | 0 | 3 | 0 | 395 | 0 |

== Honours ==
Vissel Kobe

- Emperor's Cup: 2019
- Japanese Super Cup: 2020
