= Hiroyuki Komoto =

Japanese footballer

Hiroyuki Komoto 河本 裕之
Personal information
- Full name: Hiroyuki Komoto
- Date of birth: September 4, 1985 (age 41)
- Place of birth: Kyoto, Japan
- Height: 1.83 m (6 ft 0 in)
- Position: Defender

Team information
- Current team: Omiya Ardija
- Number: 3

Youth career
- 2001–2003: Takigawa Daini High School

Senior career*
Years	Team	Apps	(Gls)
2004–2014	Vissel Kobe	212	(17)
2012	→ Omiya Ardija (loan)	13	(0)
2015–	Omiya Ardija	119	(10)
- * Club domestic league appearances and goals as of end of 2018 season

Hiroyuki Komoto (河本 裕之, Kōmoto Hiroyuki; born September 4, 1985) is a Japanese football player who plays for Omiya Ardija.

== Club statistics ==
Updated to 23 February 2018.

Club performance			League		Cup		League Cup		Total	
Season	Club	League	Apps	Goals	Apps	Goals	Apps	Goals	Apps	Goals
Japan			League		Emperor's Cup		J.League Cup		Total	
2004	Vissel Kobe	J1 League	8	2	0	0	2	0	10	2
2005	Vissel Kobe	J1 League	15	1	0	0	1	0	16	1
2006	Vissel Kobe	J2 League	23	5	0	0	-		23	5
2007	Vissel Kobe	J1 League	27	2	1	0	2	0	30	2
2008	Vissel Kobe	J1 League	10	0	1	1	2	0	13	1
2009	Vissel Kobe	J1 League	23	2	1	0	2	0	26	2
2010	Vissel Kobe	J1 League	31	1	1	0	5	0	36	1
2011	Vissel Kobe	J1 League	32	0	2	1	2	0	36	1
2012	Vissel Kobe	J1 League	1	0	-		2	2	3	2
2012	Omiya Ardija	J1 League	13	0	4	0	-		17	0
2013	Vissel Kobe	J2 League	21	2	2	0	-		23	2
2014	Vissel Kobe	J1 League	21	2	0	0	5	0	26	2
2015	Omiya Ardija	J2 League	33	4	2	0	-		35	4
2016	Omiya Ardija	J1 League	31	2	3	0	4	0	38	2
2017	Omiya Ardija	J1 League	27	1	0	0	1	0	28	1
Career total			337	26	15	2	28	2	380	30
