= Takahiro Ogihara =

Japanese footballer (born 1991)

Personal information
- Full name: Takahiro Ogihara
- Date of birth: 5 October 1991 (age 35)
- Place of birth: Sakai, Osaka, Japan
- Height: 1.85 m (6 ft 1 in)
- Position: Defensive midfielder

Team information
- Current team: Vissel Kobe
- Number: 6

Youth career
- 2001–2003: Sakai Kita FC
- 2004–2009: Cerezo Osaka

Senior career*
Years	Team	Apps	(Gls)
2010–2016	Cerezo Osaka	139	(10)
2016	Nagoya Grampus	2	(0)
2017–2021	Yokohama F. Marinos	144	(3)
2022–	Vissel Kobe	102	(6)

International career^{‡}
2011–	Japan U23	18	(2)
2013	Japan	1	(0)
Medal record
Yokohama F. Marinos
Runner-up	J.League Cup	2018
Runner-up	Emperor's Cup	2017
- * Club domestic league appearances and goals as of 10 August 2026 ‡ National team caps and goals as of 28 July 2013

Takahiro Ogihara (扇原 貴宏, Ōgihara Takahiro; born 5 October 1991) is a Japanese footballer who plays as a defensive midfielder for Vissel Kobe in the J1 League.

== Career ==
Ogihara debuted for Cerezo Osaka in the 2–1 loss to Kashima Antlers on 27 August 2011.

== International career ==
Ogihara debuted for the Japan U-23s during the Qualification process for the 2012 London Olympics, with his first game in a 2–0 win over Malaysia. He played for Japan at the 2012 Summer Olympics.

== Club statistics ==
Updated to 3 December 2023.

Club	Season	League			Cup (Note: Including Emperor's Cup)		League Cup (Note: Including J. League Cup)		Continental (Note: Including AFC Champions League)		Other (Note: Including Japanese Super Cup)		Total	
Club	Season	Division	Apps	Goals	Apps	Goals	Apps	Goals	Apps	Goals	Apps	Goals	Apps	Goals
Cerezo Osaka	2010	J1 League	0	0	0	0	0	0	-		-		0	0
Cerezo Osaka	2011	J1 League	10	4	3	0	1	0	3	0	-		17	4
Cerezo Osaka	2012	J1 League	29	2	4	0	3	1	-		-		36	3
Cerezo Osaka	2013	J1 League	32	2	3	0	8	0	-		-		43	2
Cerezo Osaka	2014	J1 League	31	0	4	0	0	0	7	0	-		42	0
Cerezo Osaka	2015	J2 League	33	2	1	0	-		-		-		34	2
Cerezo Osaka	2016	J2 League	4	0	-		-		-		-		4	0
Cerezo Osaka	Total		139	10	15	0	12	1	10	0	-		176	11
Nagoya Grampus	2016	J1 League	2	0	1	0	-		-		-		3	0
Yokohama F. Marinos	2017	J1 League	26	1	3	0	5	1	-		-		34	2
Yokohama F. Marinos	2018	J1 League	30	1	2	0	9	1	-		-		41	2
Yokohama F. Marinos	2019	J1 League	25	1	2	0	5	0	-		-		32	1
Yokohama F. Marinos	2020	J1 League	31	1	-		2	0	5	0	1	1	39	1
Yokohama F. Marinos	2021	J1 League	32	0	1	0	5	0	-		-		38	0
Yokohama F. Marinos	Total		144	4	8	0	26	2	5	0	1	1	184	6
Vissel Kobe	2022	J1 League	12	0	2	0	0	0	4	0	-		18	0
Vissel Kobe	2023	J1 League	11	0	3	0	4	0	-		-		18	0
Vissel Kobe	Total		23	0	5	0	4	0	4	0	-		36	0
Career Total			308	14	29	0	42	3	19	0	1	1	399	17

== National team statistics ==
Japan national team
Year	Apps	Goals
2013	1	0
Total	1	0

== Honours ==
=== Japan ===
- EAFF East Asian Cup: 2013

=== Vissel Kobe ===
- J1 League: 2023, 2024
- Emperor's Cup: 2024
- J1 100 Year Vision League: 2026
