= Vissel Kobe =

Association football club in Japan

Vissel Kobe ヴィッセル神戸
- Full name: Vissel Kobe
- Nickname: Ushi (cows)
- Short name: VIS
- Founded: 1966; 60 years ago as Kawasaki Steel SS
- Stadium: Noevir Stadium Kobe; Hyōgo-ku, Kōbe, Hyōgo
- Capacity: 30,134
- Owner: Rakuten
- Chairman: Hiroshi Mikitani, Yuki Chifu
- Manager: Michael Skibbe
- League: J1 League
- 2026: J1 League, 1st of 20 (champions)
- Website: vissel-kobe.co.jp
Home colours	Away colours

Vissel Kobe (ヴィッセル神戸, Visseru Kōbe) is a Japanese professional football club based in Kobe, Hyōgo Prefecture. The club plays in the J1 League, which is the top tier of football in the country. The club's home stadium is Noevir Stadium Kobe, in Hyōgo-ku, though some home matches are played at Kobe Universiade Memorial Stadium in Suma-ku.

Throughout its history, Vissel has won 2 J1 League titles, 1 Emperor's Cup, 1 Japanese Super Cup and also the J1 100 Year Vision League. The club's squad over the years has included former FIFA World Cup champions such as Andrés Iniesta, David Villa, Juan Mata and Lukas Podolski.

== History ==
=== Beginnings in Chugoku (1966–2003) ===
The club was founded in 1966 as the semi-professional Kawasaki Steel Soccer Club in Kurashiki, Okayama Prefecture. It was first promoted to the Japan Soccer League Division 2 in 1986, and remained there until the JSL folded in 1992. As their performance in the old second tier had been in the bottom nine clubs, they were put into the Japan Football League Division 2 (new third tier overall in the Japanese football league system) and stayed there until the tiers were reunited into a single second tier for 1994.

=== Move to Kansai and professionalism ===
In 1995, the city of Kobe reached an agreement with Kawasaki Steel, the parent company, to move the club to Kobe and compete for a spot in the professional J.League as Vissel Kobe. Vissel is a combination of the words "victory" and "vessel", in recognition of Kobe's history as a port city. (Owing to its importance to the city of Kobe, Kawasaki Heavy Industries, parent company of former team patron Kawasaki Steel, remains a Vissel Kobe sponsor. Kawasaki Steel was eventually sold off to become part of JFE Holdings.)

Vissel Kobe began play in 1994 in the Japan Football League, a league below J.League, and the supermarket chain Daiei was slated as the club's primary investor. However, the economic downturn following the Great Hanshin earthquake forced Daiei to pull out and the city of Kobe became responsible for operating the club.

After finishing 2nd in the JFL in 1996, Vissel was promoted to the J.League (the champions, Honda FC, refused to abandon their corporate ownership and become a professional club, and continue to often win the JFL but elect to stay there to this day) and began play in the top division of Japanese football in 1997. However, due to the inability to secure investors and sponsors in the years following the earthquake, Vissel was unable to develop as hoped. In December, 2003, mounting financial losses forced the club to file for bankruptcy protection.

=== Crimson Group years (2004–2014) ===
In January 2004, Vissel was sold to Crimson Group, parent company of online merchant Rakuten, whose president is Kobe native Hiroshi Mikitani. Vissel's first signing under the Mikitani regime, İlhan Mansız, who was acquired partly to capitalize on his popularity during the 2002 FIFA World Cup hosted in Korea and Japan, but the Turkish forward played just three matches before leaving the team because of a knee injury. At the time of the purchase, Mikitani alienated supporters by changing the team uniform colours from black and white stripes to crimson, after his Crimson Group and the colour of his alma mater, Harvard Business School. The Tohoku Rakuten Golden Eagles, a baseball team also owned by Rakuten but based in Sendai and Rakuten Monkeys, a baseball team in Taoyuan, Taiwan, wear the same colours.

Vissel finished 11th in the league in 2004, the same position as the previous year, and finished 18th and last place in 2005, resulting in relegation from J.League Division 1 - or J1 - to J2. During the two-year span, Vissel had five different head coaches. 2006 was Vissel's first season in J2 after nine years in the top division of soccer in Japan. They finished 3rd in the 2006 season and returned to J1 after beating Avispa Fukuoka in the promotion/relegation play-offs.

From 2007 until 2011, Vissel finished in the bottom half of the table each year. In 2012 they finished 16th, third from last, and were again relegated to J2. In 2013, Vissel finished in second place, 4 points behind Gamba Osaka, which secured their return to J1 for the 2014 season.

On 6 December 2014, Rakuten Inc. bought the team from the Crimson Group.

=== Rakuten years and first successes (2015–present) ===
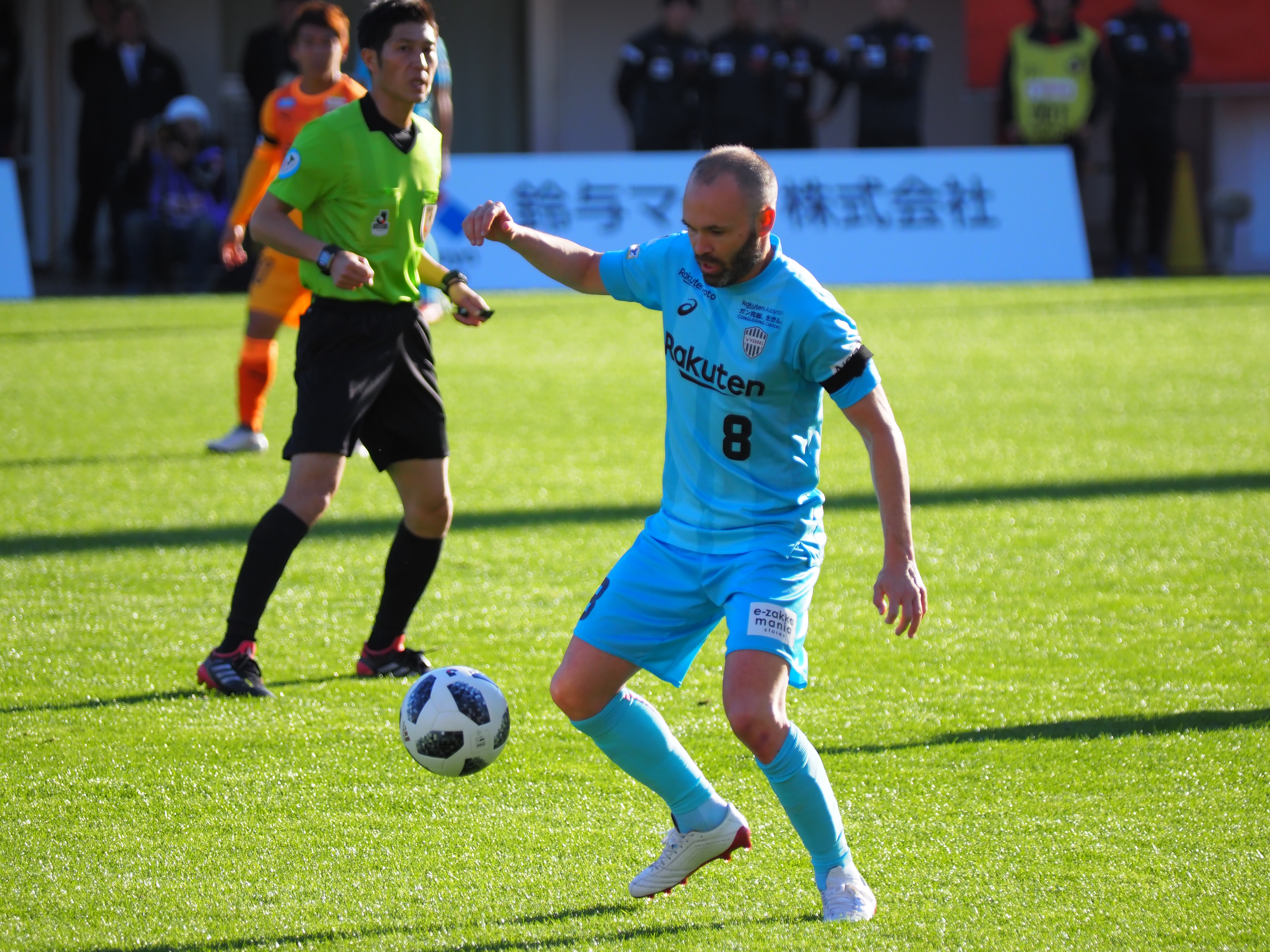
Spanish midfielder Andrés Iniesta playing for Vissel Kobe in 2018

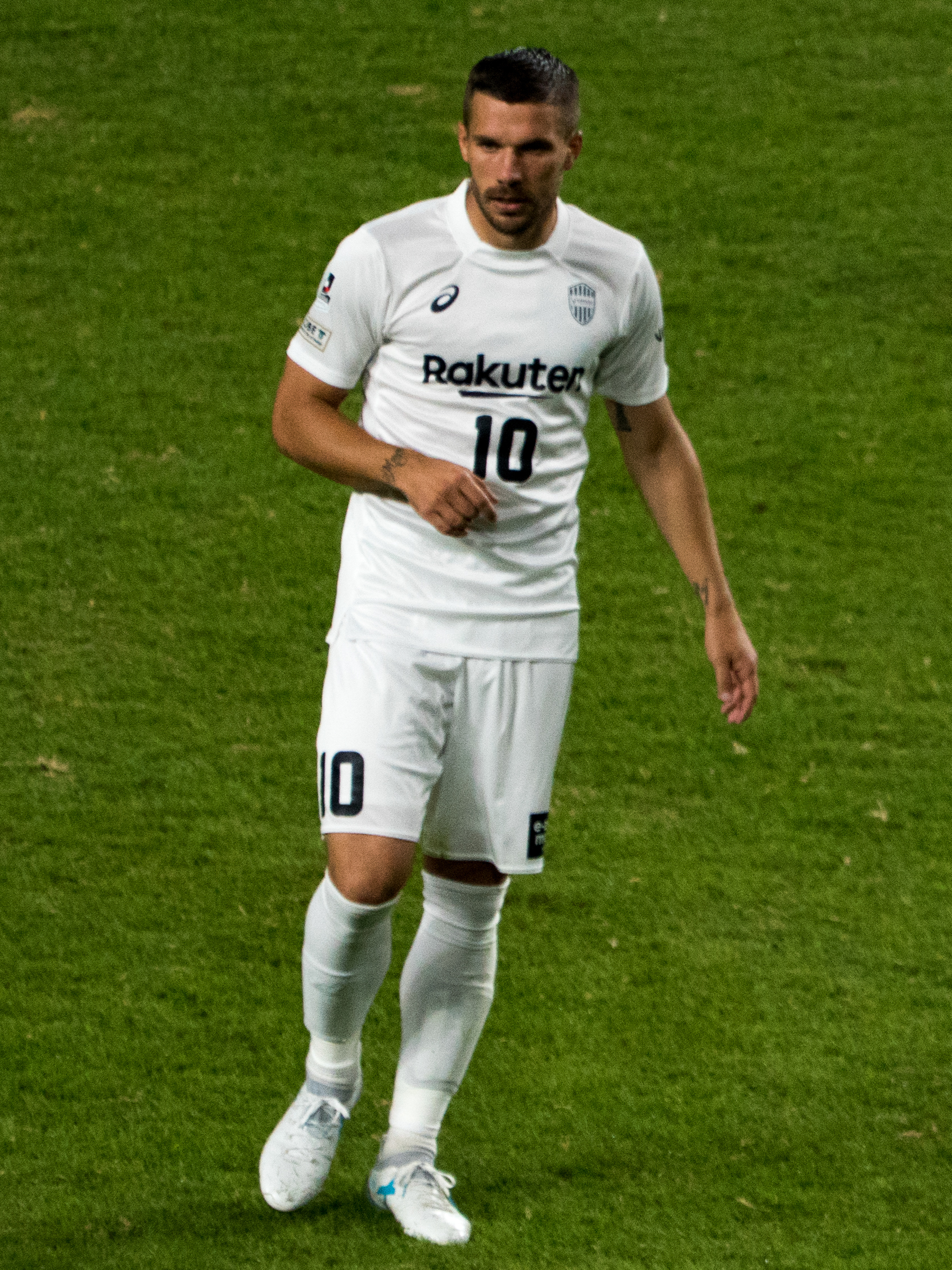
German striker Lukas Podolski playing for Vissel Kobe in 2020

In 2017, Vissel signed 2014 FIFA World Cup winner Lukas Podolski. He was the first prominent international player Vissel had signed since Michael Laudrup in 1996. Shortly after, in May 2018, Vissel signed another World Cup winner, Andrés Iniesta, from FC Barcelona. In December 2018 Vissel Kobe added former Barcelona striker David Villa, from New York City. The Spanish striker scored 13 goals in 28 games. Alongside Sergi Samper and Andrés Iniesta, Villa was the third Spaniard in the team that season that saw Vissel Kobe win the 2019 Emperor's Cup.

On 1 January 2020, first-time finalist Vissel beat Kashima Antlers in the 2019 Emperor's Cup final at the recently opened New National Stadium to win the first title in the club's history. The furthest Kobe had been in the Emperor's Cup was the semi-finals of 2000 and 2017. This was also Spanish forward David Villa's last professional match as a footballer. Vissel also qualified for the 2020 AFC Champions League for the first time. On 8 February 2020, Vissel beat Yokohama F. Marinos after a 3–3 in 90 minutes. Vissel Kobe eventually won 3-2 on penalties to win their first Japanese Super Cup title and their second national title. On 12 February 2020, Vissel played their first AFC Champions League match against Malaysian league champions, Johor Darul Ta'zim at home winning 5–1, Keijiro Ogawa scoring a hat-trick. The club reached the semi-finals, playing against eventual winners Ulsan Hyundai. Vissel was knocked out by the Korean club losing 2–1 in extra time after conceding an unfortunate, and very debatable penalty kick.

In 2021, Vissel achieved an historic third place in the table of the 2021 J1 League season, thus qualifying for the 2022 AFC Champions League yet again in which the club had another good run in the campaign before losing to Jeonbuk Hyundai Motors 3–1 in the quarter-final.

On 29 June 2022, Spanish manager Miguel Ángel Lotina was sacked by the club which then saw former player, Takayuki Yoshida promoted to the managerial role.

On 3 September 2023, Vissel signed former Spanish international midfielder, Juan Mata but, while the players and the fans benefited from his presence (players said he was amazing to train with, fans loved seeing him, he again raised the profile of the club) injuries kept him from playing much at all in meaningful games. On 25 November 2023, Vissel Kobe was confirmed as the 2023 J1 League champions for the first time in history, following a 2–1 win over Nagoya Grampus in the second last week of the season. Kobe thus became the first team to have played third tier football in Japan (Japan Football League Division 2) before winning the title. On 17 February 2024, Vissel made their second Japanese Super Cup appearance against 2023 Emperor's Cup winner, Kawasaki Frontale but lost 1–0. Vissel also qualified directly to the newly revamped 2024–25 AFC Champions League Elite tournament. On 23 November 2024, Vissel won the second Emperor's Cup of the club history, after a victory over their regional rivals Gamba Osaka in a Kansai Derby.

On 14 December 2025, Vissel announced Michael Skibbe as their new manager ahead of the J1 100 Year Vision League season. He then guided Vissel to top the West Region table thus facing off against East Region first place team, Kashima Antlers, to decide the overall champions in home and away matches. Vissel then defeated Kashima Antlers 5–2 on aggregate to become the league champions thus qualifying to the 2026–27 AFC Champions League Elite.

== Stadium ==
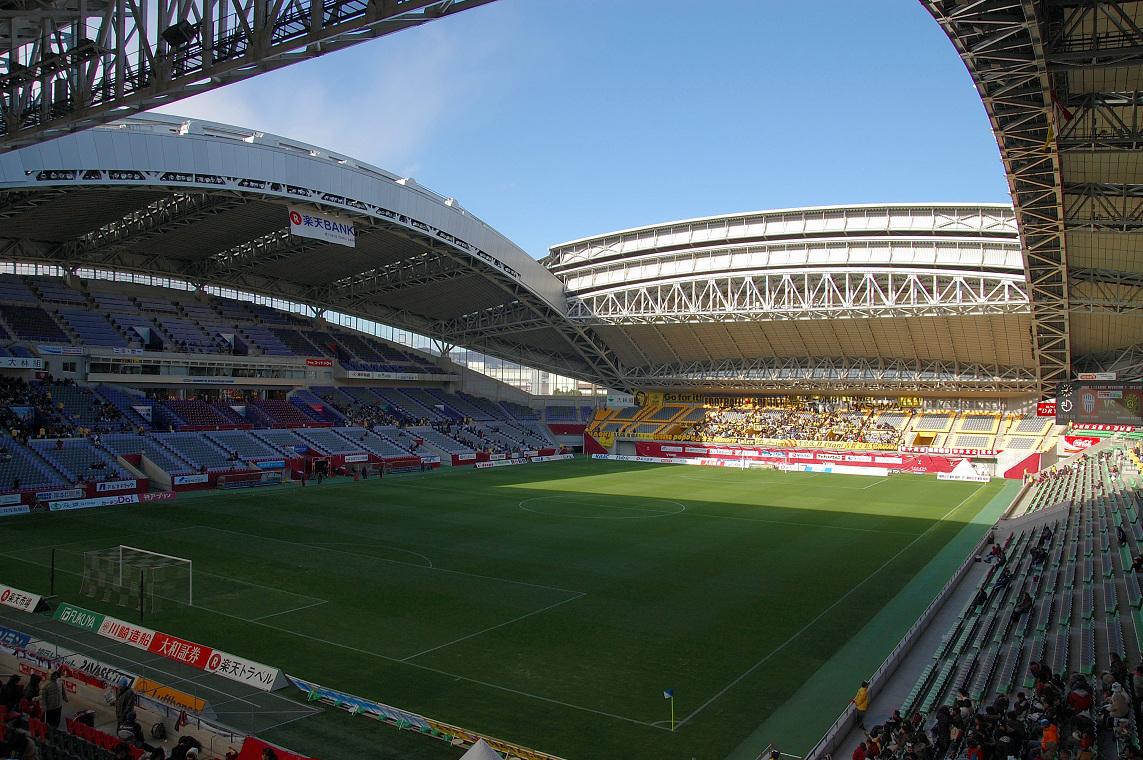
Noevir Stadium Kobe

=== Home ground ===
Vissel firstly settled at the Kobe Central Football Stadium which was opened in 1970 with a capacity of 13,000 seats. it was built on the site of the former Kobe Keirin Stadium and was the first stadium in Japan that was custom-built with floodlights, allowing any sports related activities to play at night. (In 1999, that stadium was demolished to make way to a new stadium with modern features - this became Home Stadium, later to be named Noevir Stadium). Their home for the early days of their J.League existence was Kobe's Universiade Stadium (in Sogo Undo-koen). In 2001, Vissel moved to Noevir Stadium Kobe. Located in Misaki Park, Kobe, Japan, the stadium has a capacity of 30,132 seats and features a retractable roof, making it one of the most modern football venues in Japan.

== Kit suppliers and shirt sponsors ==
=== Sponsors ===
Period	Kit manufacturer	Main sponsors
1994–1998	(Japan) Adidas	(Japan) Itoham
1999–2002	(Japan) Asics	No sponsors
2003	(Japan) Asics	(Japan) Kawasaki Heavy Industries
2004–2022	(Japan) Asics	(Japan) Rakuten
2023–present	(Japan) Asics	(Japan) Rakuten Mobile

=== Kit evolution ===
Home kit - 1st
1997 - 1998	1999 - 2002	2003 - 2004	2005 - 2006	2007
2008	2009 - 2010	2011	2012	2013
2014	2015	2016	2017	2018
2019	2020	2021	2022	2023
2024	2025	2026 -		

Away kit - 2nd
1997 - 1998	1999 - 2001	2002 - 2003	2004	2005 - 2006
2007	2008	2009	2010	2011
2012	2013	2014	2015	2016
2017	2018	2019	2020	2021
2022	2023	2024	2025	2026 -

== Affiliated clubs ==
- (England) Aston Villa (2023–present)

On 19 October 2023, English Premier League club, Aston Villa announced a collaborative partnership with Vissel Kobe - so said the press release: "further strengthening the international network and player development pipeline which is part of this exciting step forward for both clubs, Villa and Vissel are working to create a bilateral development framework for players and staff which will enhance youth development, alongside the cooperative sharing of ideas, techniques and best practice. The partnership looks to further open up pathways for talented Japanese players to play in Europe and, ultimately, at Aston Villa. This synergy between the clubs will also extend to first team level, with the exchange of technical knowledge and coaching methodology together with collaboration in the areas of performance, scouting & recruitment, data analysis and overall squad management."

- (Poland) Górnik Zabrze (2024–present)

Both clubs are tied with an agreement signed in December 2024. Vissel Kobe and Górnik Zabrze will work on making the path between Asia and Europe to promote both teams in case of sporting performance and scouting.

- (United States) Seattle Sounders (1995–1996, 2025–present)

Shortly after moving to Kobe in 1995, Vissel partnered with the Sounders (who, at the time, were newly members of the second-division American Professional Soccer League), as Seattle and Kobe are sister cities. The agreement lasted from 1995 to 1996, and during this time, the teams played a home and away exhibition series to fundraise for the relief efforts following the 1995 earthquake in Kobe. In 2025, on the thirtieth anniversary of the original partnership on 17 January, Vissel and the Sounders (now a member of top-division Major League Soccer) announced the re-establishment of their partnership. This agreement began with a loan of Kobe player Kaito Yamada to Seattle's reserve squad, the Tacoma Defiance.

=== Former ===
- (Spain) FC Barcelona (2019–2025)

This partnership will further deepen the relationship between FC Barcelona and Vissel Kobe. The Japanese club currently features three players who have been part of the Barcelona family, namely Andrés Iniesta, David Villa and Sergi Samper. Besides, Vissel is also working on fostering the next generation of young talent by introducing new training methods to its academy and going on trips to Barcelona.

== Players ==
=== First-team squad ===
As of 16 September 2026.

Note: Flags indicate national team as defined under FIFA eligibility rules; some limited exceptions apply. Players may hold more than one non-FIFA nationality.

No.	Pos.	Nation	Player
1	GK	JPN	Daiya Maekawa
2	MF	JPN	Nanasei Iino
3	DF	BRA	Matheus Thuler
4	DF	JPN	Tetsushi Yamakawa (captain)
5	MF	JPN	Yuta Goke
6	MF	JPN	Takahiro Ogihara
7	MF	JPN	Yosuke Ideguchi
9	FW	BRA	Anderson Lopes
10	FW	JPN	Yuya Osako
11	FW	JPN	Yoshinori Muto
13	FW	JPN	Daiju Sasaki (vice-captain)
15	DF	BRA	Diego
16	DF	BRA	Caetano
17	MF	JPN	Issei Takahashi
18	MF	JPN	Haruya Ide
20	MF	JPN	Kōta Watanabe
21	GK	JPN	Shota Arai
23	MF	JPN	Yuan Iwamoto ^{DSP}
24	DF	JPN	Gōtoku Sakai (vice-captain)
25	MF	JPN	Yuya Kuwasaki

No.	Pos.	Nation	Player
26	FW	BRA	Jean Patric
28	MF	JPN	Kento Hamasaki
29	FW	JPN	Ren Komatsu
31	DF	JPN	Takuya Iwanami
32	GK	NGR	Richard Monday Ubong
33	MF	JPN	Rikuto Hashimoto
35	FW	JPN	Niina Tominaga
38	MF	JPN	Juzo Ura
39	GK	JPN	Shioki Takayama
41	DF	JPN	Katsuya Nagato
42	DF	JPN	Justin Homma
43	DF	JPN	Kaito Yamada
44	MF	JPN	Mitsuki Hidaka
46	FW	JPN	Sota Ito
53	FW	JPN	Hayato Watanabe ^{Type 2}
55	FW	JPN	Yuta Miyahara
58	MF	JPN	Sota Onishi
71	GK	JPN	Shūichi Gonda
94	FW	BRA	Erik

=== Out on loan ===
Note: Flags indicate national team as defined under FIFA eligibility rules; some limited exceptions apply. Players may hold more than one non-FIFA nationality.

No.	Pos.	Nation	Player
30	MF	JPN	Kakeru Yamauchi (at Sagan Tosu)
45	FW	JPN	David Aizawa (at Oita Trinita)
—	DF	JPN	Yusei Ozaki (at RB Omiya Ardija)
—	DF	JPN	Boniface Nduka (at JEF United Chiba)

No.	Pos.	Nation	Player
—	DF	JPN	Haruka Motoyama (at Fagiano Okayama)
—	DF	JPN	Shogo Terasaka (at Zweigen Kanazawa)
—	MF	JPN	Shuto Adachi (at Thespa Gunma)
—	FW	JPN	Taiga Seguchi (at (Slovakia) FC Košice)

== Management and staff ==
Club officials for 2026.

Position	Name
Manager	(Germany) Michael Skibbe
Head coach	(Germany) Serhat Umar
Assistant coaches	(Japan) Tadahiro Akiba (Japan) Tomo Sugawara (Japan) Kunie Kitamoto
Young player development coach	(Japan) Yuji Miyahara
Goalkeeper coach	(Brazil) Sidmar
Analytical coach	(Japan) Tatsuro Takenaka (Japan) Daichi Matsumoto
Physical coach	(Japan) Akira Umeki (Japan) Hikaru Fujii
Interpreter	(Japan) Eiji Kumon (Japan) Daisuke Kawashima
Chief trainer	(Japan) Yoshio Shibata
Trainer	(Japan) Masaaki Morita (Japan) Ryota Matsuda (Japan) Minoru Onogawa (Japan) Naoto Nakayama
Dietitian	(Japan) Rika Kawabata
Chief side manager	(Japan) Shusuke Sasagawa
Equipment manager	(Japan) Takuya Arai (Japan) Tomoki Ishiguro
Side manager	(Japan) Yuto Kato

== Honours ==
Type	Honours	Titles	Season
League	J1 League	2	2023, 2024
League	J1 100 Year Vision League	1	2026
League	Chūgoku Soccer League	5	1980, 1981, 1982, 1984, 1985
Cup	Emperor's Cup	2	2019, 2024
Cup	Japanese Super Cup	1	2020
Cup	All Japan Senior Football Championship	1	1976

Bold is for those competition that are currently active.

== Records and statistics ==
As of 23 March 2026.

Top 10 all-time appeareances
Rank	Player	Years	Club appearance
1	(Japan) Kunie Kitamoto	2000–2018	474
2	(Japan) Hideo Tanaka	2005–2017	325
3	(South Korea) Park Kang-jo	2003–2012	298
4	(Japan) Keijiro Ogawa	2010–2020	283
5	(Japan) Gōtoku Sakai	2019–present	250
6	(Japan) Hiroyuki Komoto	2004–2014	245
7	(Japan) Hotaru Yamaguchi	2019–2024	242
8	(Japan) Hiroto Mogi	2006–2014	235
9	(Japan) Daiju Sasaki	2018–present	232
10	(Japan) Daiya Maekawa	2017–present	230

Top 10 all-time goalscorer
Rank	Player	Club appearance	Total goals
1	(Japan) Yuya Osako	174	66
2	(Japan) Kazuma Watanabe	154	56
2	(Japan) Yoshito Ōkubo	170	56
4	(Brazil) Leandro	124	54
5	(Japan) Kyōgo Furuhashi	111	49
5	(Japan) Keijiro Ogawa	235	49
7	(Japan) Akihiro Nagashima	107	45
8	(Japan) Yoshinori Muto	163	42
9	(Brazil) Popó	112	37
10	(South Korea) Park Kang-jo	298	35

- Biggest wins: 8–0 vs Matsumoto Yamaga (2 November 2008)
- Heaviest defeats: 1–7 vs Ōita Trinita (26 July 2003)
- Youngest goal scorers: Ryo Matsumura ~ 17 years 11 months 1 days old (On 16 May 2012 vs Shimizu S-Pulse)
- Oldest goal scorers: (Brazil) Marquinhos ~ 39 years 3 months 18 days old (On 11 July 2015 vs Shimizu S-Pulse)
- Youngest ever debutant: Taiga Seguchi ~ 17 years 1 months 8 days old (On 18 February 2025 vs (China) Shanghai Shenghua)
- Oldest ever player: (Brazil) Santos ~ 40 years 11 months 8 days old (On 17 November 2001 vs FC Tokyo)

== Award winners ==
As of the end of the 2025 season.

- J.League Player of the Year:

- (Japan) Yuya Osako (2023)
- (Japan) Yoshinori Muto (2024)

- J.League Top Scorer:

- (Brazil) Leandro (2016)
- (Japan) Yuya Osako (2023)

- J.League Best XI:
  - (Brazil) Leandro (2016)
  - (Spain) Andrés Iniesta (2019, 2021)
  - (Japan) Gōtoku Sakai (2023)
  - (Japan) Hotaru Yamaguchi (2023)
  - (Japan) Yuya Osako (2023, 2024)
  - (Japan) Yoshinori Muto (2023, 2024)
  - (Brazil) Matheus Thuler (2024)
- Individual Fair Play Award:
  - (Japan) Akihiro Nagashima (1997)
  - (Japan) Ryota Morioka (2014)
  - (Japan) Hotaru Yamaguchi (2020)
  - (Japan) Daiya Maekawa (2025)
- J.League Goal of the Year:

- (Spain) David Villa against Nagoya Grampus (30 June 2019)

== Managerial history ==
Manager	Period	Honours
(Scotland) Stuart Baxter	1 February 1995 – 31 January 1998	
(Spain) Benito Floro	1 February 1998 – 24 September 1998	
(Japan) Harumi Kori	25 September 1998 – 31 January 1999	
(Japan) Ryoichi Kawakatsu	1 February 1999 – 25 July 2002	
(Japan) Hiroshi Matsuda	1 July 2002 – 31 January 2003	
(Japan) Hiroshi Soejima	1 February 2003 – 31 January 2004	
(Czech Republic) Ivan Hašek	1 February 2004 – 30 September 2004	
(Japan) Hiroshi Kato	1 October 2004 – 31 January 2005	
(Japan) Hideki Matsunaga	1 February 2005 – 19 April 2005	
(Brazil) Émerson Leão	19 April 2005 – 14 June 2005	
(Czech Republic) Pavel Řehák	15 June 2005 – 31 January 2006	
(Scotland) Stuart Baxter (2)	1 February 2006 – 4 September 2006	
(Japan) Hiroshi Matsuda	5 September 2006 – 11 December 2008	
(Brazil) Caio Júnior (interim)	11 December 2008 – 30 June 2009	
(Japan) Masahiro Wada (interim)	1 July 2009 – 5 August 2009	
(Japan) Toshiya Miura	5 August 2009 – 11 September 2010	
(Japan) Masahiro Wada (2)	11 September 2010 – 30 April 2012	
(Japan) Ryo Adachi (interim)	1 May 2012 – 21 May 2012	
(Japan) Akira Nishino	22 May 2012 – 8 November 2012	
(Japan) Ryo Adachi (interim) (2)	9 November 2012 – 31 December 2012	
(Japan) Ryo Adachi (3)	1 January 2013 – 31 January 2015	
(Brazil) Nelsinho Baptista	1 February 2015 – 15 August 2017	
(Japan) Takayuki Yoshida	16 August 2017 – 16 September 2018	
(Japan) Kentaro Hayashi (interim)	17 September 2017 – 3 October 2018	
(Spain) Juan Manuel Lillo	4 October 2018 – 16 April 2019	
(Japan) Takayuki Yoshida (2)	17 April 2019 – 8 June 2019	
(Germany) Thorsten Fink	9 June 2019 – 21 September 2020	– 2019 Emperor's Cup – 2020 Japanese Super Cup
(Spain) Marcos Vives (interim)	22 September 2020 – 23 September 2020	
(Japan) Atsuhiro Miura	24 September 2020 – 20 March 2022	
(Spain) Lluís Planagumà (interim)	21 March 2022 – 7 April 2022	
(Spain) Miguel Ángel Lotina	8 April 2022 – 29 June 2022	
(Japan) Takayuki Yoshida (3)	30 June 2022 – 13 December 2025	– 2023 J1 League – 2024 J1 League – 2024 Emperor's Cup
(Germany) Michael Skibbe	14 December 2025 – present	– J1 100 Year Vision League

== Season by season record ==
Champions	Runners-up	Third place	Promoted	Relegated

League													J.League Cup	Emperor's Cup
Season	Division	Teams	Position	Plays	W (OTW / PKW)	D	L (OTL / PKL)	F	A	GD	Points	Attendance/G	J.League Cup	Emperor's Cup
1997	J1	17	16th	32	6 (1 / 0)	–	21 (2 / 0)	43	78	-35	24	6,567	Group stage	Round of 16
1998	J1	18	17th	34	8 (0 / 1)	–	23 (2 / 0)	45	89	-44	25	7,686	Group stage	3rd round
1999	J1	16	10th	30	9 (3)	4	12 (2)	38	45	-7	37	7,691	1st round	3rd round
2000	J1	16	13th	30	10 (1)	1	16 (2)	40	49	-9	33	7,512	2nd round	Semi-finals
2001	J1	16	12th	30	8 (1)	7	10 (4)	41	52	-11	33	13,872	2nd round	Round of 16
2002	J1	16	14th	30	8 (2)	3	17	33	44	-11	31	10,467	Group stage	3rd round
2003	J1	16	13th	30	8	6	16	35	63	-28	30	11,195	Group stage	Quarter-finals
2004	J1	16	11th	30	9	9	12	50	55	-5	36	15,735	Group stage	4th round
2005	J1	18	18th	34	4	9	21	30	67	-37	21	14,913	Group stage	4th round
2006	J2	13	3rd	48	25	11	12	78	53	25	86	6,910	–	3rd round
2007	J1	18	10th	34	13	8	13	58	48	10	47	12,460	Group stage	Round of 16
2008	J1	18	10th	34	12	11	11	39	38	1	47	12,981	Group stage	Round of 16
2009	J1	18	14th	34	10	9	15	40	48	-8	39	13,068	Group stage	Round of 16
2010	J1	18	15th	34	9	11	14	37	45	-8	38	12,824	Group stage	3rd round
2011	J1	18	9th	34	13	7	14	44	45	-1	46	13,233	1st round	3rd round
2012	J1	18	16th	34	11	6	17	41	50	-9	39	14,638	Group stage	2nd round
2013	J2	22	2nd	42	25	8	9	78	41	37	83	11,516	–	3rd round
2014	J1	18	11th	34	11	12	11	49	50	-1	45	15,010	Quarter-finals	2nd round
2015	J1	18	12th	34	10	8	16	44	49	-5	38	16,265	Semi-finals	Quarter-finals
2016	J1	18	7th	34	16	7	11	56	43	13	55	17,018	Quarter-finals	Round of 16
2017	J1	18	9th	34	13	5	16	40	45	-5	44	18,272	Quarter-finals	Semi-finals
2018	J1	18	10th	34	12	9	13	45	52	-7	45	21,450	Play-off stage	Round of 16
2019	J1	18	8th	34	14	5	15	61	59	2	47	21,491	Group stage	Winners
2020 †	J1	18	14th	34	9	9	16	50	59	-9	36	6,041	Quarter-finals	Did not qualify
2021 †	J1	20	3rd	38	21	10	7	62	36	26	73	7,120	Play-off stage	Round of 16
2022	J1	18	13th	34	11	7	16	35	41	-6	40	15,572	Quarter-finals	Quarter-finals
2023	J1	18	1st	34	21	8	5	60	29	31	71	22,405	Group stage	Quarter-finals
2024	J1	20	1st	38	21	9	8	61	36	25	72	21,811	3rd round	Winners
2025	J1	20	5th	38	18	10	10	46	33	13	64	21,099	Quarter-finals	Runners-up
2026	J1	10	1st	18	9	6	3	27	21	6	35		N/A	N/A
2026-27	J1	20	TBD	38									TBD	TBD

Key

- Pos. = Position in league; P = Games played; W = Games won; D = Games drawn; L = Games lost; F = Goals scored; A = Goals conceded; GD = Goals difference; Pts = Points gained
- OTW / PKW = Overtime wins / penalty kicks win 1997 and 1998 seasons – 1999, 2000, 2001 & 2002 overtime wins only
- OTL / PKL = Overtime losses / penalty kicks losses 1997 and 1998 seasons – 1999, 2000 & 2001 overtime losses only
- Attendance/G = Average home league attendance
- † 2020 & 2021 seasons attendances reduced by COVID-19 worldwide pandemic
- Source: J.League Data Site

== Continental record ==
Season	Competition	Round	Club	Home	Away	Aggregate
2020	AFC Champions League	Group G	(Malaysia) Johor Darul Ta'zim	~~5–1~~	Cancelled	1st
2020	AFC Champions League	Group G	(South Korea) Suwon Samsung Bluewings	0–2	1–0	1st
2020	AFC Champions League	Group G	(China) Guangzhou Evergrande	0–2	3–1	1st
2020	AFC Champions League	Round of 16	(China) Shanghai Port	2–0		
2020	AFC Champions League	Quarter-finals	(South Korea) Suwon Samsung Bluewings	1–1 (a.e.t.) (7–6 p)		
2020	AFC Champions League	Semi-finals	(South Korea) Ulsan Hyundai	1–2 (a.e.t.)		
2022	AFC Champions League	Play-off round	(Australia) Melbourne Victory	4–3 (a.e.t.)		
2022	AFC Champions League	Group J	(China) Shanghai Port	Cancelled		
2022	AFC Champions League	Group J	(Hong Kong) Kitchee	2–1	2–2	1st
2022	AFC Champions League	Group J	(Thailand) Chiangrai United	6–0	0–0	1st
2022	AFC Champions League	Round of 16	(Japan) Yokohama F. Marinos	3–2		
2022	AFC Champions League	Quarter-finals	(South Korea) Jeonbuk Hyundai Motors	1–3 (a.e.t.)		
2024–25	AFC Champions League	League stage	(Thailand) Buriram United	—N/a	0–0	5th
2024–25	AFC Champions League	League stage	(China) Shandong Taishan	~~2–1~~	—N/a	5th
2024–25	AFC Champions League	League stage	(South Korea) Ulsan HD	—N/a	2–0	5th
2024–25	AFC Champions League	League stage	(South Korea) Gwangju FC	2–0	—N/a	5th
2024–25	AFC Champions League	League stage	(Australia) Central Coast Mariners	3–2	—N/a	5th
2024–25	AFC Champions League	League stage	(South Korea) Pohang Steelers	—N/a	1–3	5th
2024–25	AFC Champions League	League stage	(China) Shanghai Port	4–0	—N/a	5th
2024–25	AFC Champions League	League stage	(China) Shanghai Shenhua	—N/a	2–4	5th
2024–25	AFC Champions League	Round of 16	(South Korea) Gwangju FC	2–0	0–3 (a.e.t.)	2–3
2025–26	AFC Champions League	League stage	(China) Shanghai Port	—N/a	3–0	2nd
2025–26	AFC Champions League	League stage	(Australia) Melbourne City	1–0	—N/a	2nd
2025–26	AFC Champions League	League stage	(South Korea) Gangwon FC	—N/a	3–4	2nd
2025–26	AFC Champions League	League stage	(South Korea) Ulsan HD	1–0	—N/a	2nd
2025–26	AFC Champions League	League stage	(China) Shanghai Shenhua	—N/a	2–0	2nd
2025–26	AFC Champions League	League stage	(China) Chengdu Rongcheng	2–2	—N/a	2nd
2025–26	AFC Champions League	League stage	(South Korea) FC Seoul	2–0	—N/a	2nd
2025–26	AFC Champions League	League stage	(Malaysia) Johor Darul Ta'zim	—N/a	0–1	2nd
2025–26	AFC Champions League	Round of 16	(South Korea) FC Seoul	2–1	1–0	3–1
2025–26	AFC Champions League	Quarter-finals	(Qatar) Al Sadd	3–3 (a.e.t.) (5–4 p)		
2025–26	AFC Champions League	Semi-finals	(Saudi Arabia) Al-Ahli	1–2		
2026–27	AFC Champions League	League stage	(Thailand) Port	—N/a	2–1	
2026–27	AFC Champions League	League stage	(South Korea) Jeonbuk Hyundai Motors	2–0	—N/a	
2026–27	AFC Champions League	League stage	(South Korea) Daejeon Hana Citizen	—N/a	1–0	
2026–27	AFC Champions League	League stage	(Thailand) Ratchaburi	3–2	—N/a	
2026–27	AFC Champions League	League stage	(Vietnam) Công An Hà Nội	—N/a		
2026–27	AFC Champions League	League stage	(Australia) Newcastle Jets		—N/a	
2026–27	AFC Champions League	League stage	(South Korea) Pohang Steelers		—N/a	
2026–27	AFC Champions League	League stage	(Thailand) Buriram United	—N/a		

== League history ==
- Chugoku Soccer League: 1978–85 (as Kawasaki Steel Mizushima)
- Division 2 (Japan Soccer League Div. 2): 1986–91 (Kawasaki Steel Mizushima until 1987; Kawasaki Steel afterwards)
- Division 3 (Old JFL Div. 2): 1992–93 (as Kawasaki Steel)
- Division 2 (Old JFL): 1994–96 (Kawasaki Steel 1994; Vissel Kobe since 1995)
- Division 1 (J.League): 1997–2005
- Division 2 (J.League Division 2): 2006
- Division 1 (J.League Division 1): 2007–12
- Division 2 (J.League Division 2): 2013
- Division 1 (J1 League): 2014–present

Total (as of 2024): 26 seasons in the top tier, 11 seasons in the second tier, 2 seasons in the third tier and 8 seasons in the Regional Leagues.
