= 2019 CR Flamengo season =

Flamengo
2019 season
- President: Rodolfo Landim
- Head coach: Abel Braga (until 29 May); Marcelo Salles (caretaker, 29 May – 20 June); Jorge Jesus (from 20 June)
- Stadium: Estádio do Maracanã
- Série A: 1st
- Campeonato Carioca: Winners
- Copa do Brasil: Quarter-final
- Copa Libertadores: Winners
- Club World Cup: Runners-up
- Top goalscorer: League: Gabriel Barbosa (25); All: Gabriel Barbosa (43)
- Highest home attendance: 69,981 (23 October vs. Grêmio)
- Lowest home attendance: 26,405 (24 February vs. Americano)
- Average home league attendance: 59,284
Home colours	Away colours	Third colours

The 2019 season was Clube de Regatas do Flamengo's 124th year of existence, their 108th football season, and their 49th in the Brazilian Série A, having never been relegated from the top division. In addition to the 2019 Brasileirão, Flamengo also competed in the CONMEBOL Copa Libertadores, the Copa do Brasil, and the Campeonato Carioca, the top tier of Rio de Janeiro's state football league.

The season was one of the most successful in Flamengo's history, as the team captured their second Copa Libertadores, seventh Campeonato Brasileiro Série A, and record 35th Campeonato Carioca. The team qualified for the 2019 FIFA Club World Cup by winning the Copa Libertadores, finishing as runners-up to UEFA Champions League winners Liverpool.

The season is marked by the tragic fire on 8 February at the Ninho do Urubu training center that claimed the lives of ten youth players who were sleeping in their rooms at the camp. The incident is considered the worst tragedy ever experienced by the club in its history.

Flamengo won their 35th Campeonato Carioca, defeating rivals Vasco da Gama across two legs in April.

On 1 June, Flamengo hired Portuguese manager Jorge Jesus after the resignation of Abel Braga. In June and July, Flamengo completed the signings of prominent free agent fullbacks Rafinha from Bayern Munich and Filipe Luís from Atlético Madrid, to play alongside the new signings of Gabriel Barbosa, Bruno Henrique and Giorgian de Arrascaeta. Flamengo were eliminated from the Copa do Brasil in the quarter-finals after a penalty shootout loss to Athletico Paranaense in the Maracanã on 17 July.

In August, Flamengo defeated Internacional to advance to the club's first Copa Libertadores semi-finals since 1984. On 23 October, the team defeated Grêmio 5–0 in the Maracanã to advance to their first Libertadores final since 1981. For the first time, the Copa Libertadores final would be played as a single match at a venue selected in advance. The location of the final was originally chosen to be the Estadio Nacional in Santiago, Chile. However, due to the ongoing Chilean protests, the match was moved to the Estadio Monumental in Lima, Peru. On 23 November in the final against defending champions River Plate, Flamengo trailed 0–1 in the final minutes before Gabriel scored twice to secure the 2–1 victory.

The day after the come-from-behind victory in the Libertadores, Flamengo became champions of the Campeonato Brasileiro with four matches in hand after a loss by Palmeiras to Grêmio in the 34th round. This was a Flamengo Brazilian title after a hiatus since 2009. This feat marked the first time a Brazilian club had won the Brazilian league and Copa Libertadores in the same season since Santos in 1962 and 1963. The title-winning campaign broke a number of records in the 20-team league format era (2006–present), including most victories (28), most points (90), most goals (86), best goal differential (+49), and most goals by a single player (25 from Gabriel Barbosa).

The team qualified to their first Club World Cup in Doha, Qatar in December, defeating Jorge Jesus's former club Al Hilal 3–1 in the semi-final before confronting Liverpool, the same opponent as the club's only world championship appearance and victory in the 1981 Intercontinental Cup. Both teams were closely matched in the final, ending regulation time in a scoreless draw. In the first half of extra time, Roberto Firmino of Liverpool scored the lone goal in Liverpool's 1–0 victory and Flamengo finished the competition as runners-up.

== Kits ==
Supplier: Adidas / Sponsor: Banco BS2 / Back of the shirt: MRV / Lower back: Multimarcas Consórcios / Shoulder: Sportsbet.io / Sleeves: Buser / Numbers: TIM / Shorts: Benevix / Socks: Azeite Royal

Home	Home alternate	Away	Away alternate	Third	Goalkeeper	Goalkeeper alternate	Goalkeeper alternate 2

== Ninho do Urubu fire ==
On the morning of 8 February, a fire erupted at the Ninho do Urubu youth training ground of Flamengo. The fire resulted in the deaths of ten academy players between the ages of 14 and 17 training with the club. Three others were injured. The cause of the fire was a malfunctioning air-conditioning unit that caught fire in the room of one of the victims close to 5:00. Intense storms caused flooding and tornadoes in Rio de Janeiro on the days before, likely requiring the training center to run on peak power. The location of the fire was the temporary living quarters in a newly expanded section of the campus. The state Labor Ministry launched a task force to determine if any preventative actions could have been taken, and to ensure that the families of the victims would be accommodated.

The victims of the fire were Athila Paixão (14 years old), Arthur Vinícius de Barros Silva Freitas (14), Bernardo Pisetta (14), Christian Esmério (15), Jorge Eduardo Santos (15), Pablo Henrique da Silva Matos (14), Vitor Isaías (15), Samuel Thomas Rosa (15), Gerdson Santos (14), and Ryckelmo de Souza Viana (17). Kauan Emanuel Nunes (14 years old), Francisco Diogo Alves (15) and Jhonathan Cruz Ventura (15) were hospitalized with injuries; Jhonathan's condition was the most severe.

Club president Rodolfo Landim described it as "the worst tragedy the club has ever experienced in its 123 years." The governor of the state of Rio de Janeiro declared a three-day period of mourning following the tragedy. The Taça Guanabara semifinal matches on the following days, including Flamengo's match against Fluminense, were postponed. Flamengo wore black ribbons on their shirts for all following matches in the season as a symbol of mourning in honor of the victims.

The Attorney General filed a lawsuit against Flamengo on 20 February requesting allocation of reparations to the victims and their families, and for the suspension of activities at the training center. The club entered mediation and negotiated directly with the families of victims, and were scrutinized for offering a lower compensation than the proposal from the Public Labor Ministry and the Public Defender's Office. On 27 February, the city of Rio de Janeiro officially enforced an interdiction of the Ninho do Urubu training center for the senior team (youth players had already been banned from the facilities after the fire). The interdiction is an enforcement of a penalty already applied to the training center in 2017 for operating without a valid license. The team moved their training activities to Gávea.

the center was released for use for the professional team in March and the youth levels in April, however players were not permitted to sleep at the center. On 24 May, the Childhood and Youth Court fully released the Ninho do Urubu training center for regular use.

In June, Rio police indicted former Flamengo president Eduardo Bandeira de Mello, along with seven engineers and technicians from Flamengo and the company that constructed the containers, on 10 counts of homicide and 14 counts of attempted homicide after concluding that the containers should not have been used as sleeping quarters. In July, the public prosecutor of Rio de Janeiro did not find sufficient cause to bring the eight defendants to trial, and granted 45 days for police to provide clarification on aspects of the investigation.

== Season overview ==
Pre-season

On 19 December 2018 Rodolfo Landim was sworn in as Flamengo's new president after being elected on the 8th and officially took over official administrative roles on 1 January. Eduardo Bandeira de Mello had been president for two 3-year terms. Before officially taking office, Landim announced that plans to hire Abel Braga as the new head coach in 2019 were already underway. Braga was officially announced as the replacement to Dorival Júnior at the start of the new year. Braga had previously managed Flamengo in 2004.

On 29 December a deal for São Paulo center-back Rodrigo Caio was reportedly closed on 29 December — €5m for five years and 45% of the player's rights.

On 8 January Flamengo reached an agreement with Cruzeiro to sign highly-sought attacking midfielder de Arrascaeta for R$55.3m in three installments, the largest transfer fee in Flamengo's history. The Uruguayan player was officially announced on 12 January.

On 8 January it was reported that Flamengo had secured a loan deal for striker Gabriel Barbosa, the leading goalscorer in the 2018 Brasileirão and the Copa do Brasil while on loan with Santos. The club negotiated the loan with Inter Milan, Gabriel's contract holders. Flamengo paid no loan fee but are responsible for the entirety of his R$15m / €3.5m annual salary, the most expensive on the roster.

In January Flamengo traveled to Orlando, Florida for participation in the 2019 Florida Cup with friendly matches against Ajax and Eintracht Frankfurt. Rodrigo Caio was the only new signing to travel with the club for Flamengo's first trip to the United States in nearly 13 years.

On 10 January Flamengo defeated Ajax on penalty kicks in the Florida Cup. Fernando Uribe scored both goals for Flamengo in regular time, and Veltman and Magallán of Ajax missed their penalties.

On 12 January Flamengo defeated Eintracht Frankfurt in Orlando City Stadium 1–0, goal scored by Jean Lucas. The victory gave Flamengo the Florida Cup title on points (2 for the penalty win, 3 for the win).

On 22 January, amidst rumors of a transfer to Orlando City of MLS, 33 year-old midfielder Diego extended his contract with Flamengo until the end of 2020. His contract was set to expire in July and the club only agreed to renew with a reduction in salary.

On 23 January, Flamengo and Santos completed negotiations for the 28 year-old forward Bruno Henrique to sign with Flamengo in exchange for R$23m paid in three installations, and a one-year loan of 22 year-old midfielder Ronaldo to Santos for €3m (R$12.9m). However disagreements over salary between Santos and Ronaldo caused the loan to fall through, and it was announced later in the month that Ronaldo would remain at Flamengo. A deal was later reached to loan 20 year-old Jean Lucas to the São Paulo club instead.

January

On 20 January Flamengo began their 2019 campaign in the Campeonato Carioca against Bangu. In front of a crowd of 40 thousand in the Maracanã, Flamengo conceded to the visitors within 3 minutes. Diego equalized on a 1st half penalty in an irregular play after the ball had gone out of bounds, and Rhodolfo scored a header to seal the victory. Gabriel and Arrascaeta were presented to the fans but did not feature in the match.

On 23 January Flamengo's reserve squad faced Resende. Flamengo again conceded first before equalizing with a bicycle kick from Henrique Dourado.

On 26 January, Bruno Henrique scored both goals in his Flamengo debut: a 2–1 victory over Botafogo, Flamengo's first classico of the season. Flamengo's opponents again scored the first goal.

February

On 8 February, a fire at Ninho do Urubu training center claimed the lives of 10 youth academy players.

On 14 February Flamengo fell to rivals Fluminense in the semi-final of the Taça Guanabara, their first match after the fire at the training center.

On 25 February, Henrique Dourado traveled to China to join Henan Jianye. Flamengo had negotiated a transfer of the striker for close to €6m (of which Flamengo received 75%).

On 26 February the club released their 30-man roster for the Copa Libertadores group stage.

March

On 5 March, Flamengo's 1–0 victory against San José in Oruro, Bolivia in the Copa Libertadores marked the first time in history the club had won away from home in their first match of continental competition.

On 13 March, Flamengo defeated LDU in the Copa Libertadores 3–1. Éverton Ribeiro scored early in the 1st half. Diego committed a foul in the box against Vega but Diego Alves saved the penalty of Intriago. Gabriel and Uribe scored in the 2nd half but Borja scored once for LDU in the final moments.

On 19 March Flamengo guaranteed their berth in the Carioca championship phase after defeating Madureira 2–0 in the penultimate round of the Taça Rio.

On 22 March Flamengo announced the closing of a deal with new primary kit sponsor Bank BS2. The deal is in place for 2 years and is valued at approximately R$25m total. Adidas officially unveiled the 2019-20 Flamengo home kit on 22 March, and the team debuted it against Fluminense.

On 24 March, Flamengo faced rivals Fluminense and won 3–2. Miguel Trauco, Robert Piris Da Motta, Giorgian de Arrascaeta, and Gustavo Cuéllar were called up by their national teams to participate in friendlies before the Copa América and were not available for the match.

On 27 March Flamengo again faced Fluminense in the semifinal of the second phase of the Campeonato Carioca, the Taça Rio. Flamengo required a win, as Fluminense would advance with a draw. Éverton Ribeiro converted a penalty in stoppage time to win, 2–1. Prior to this, manager Abel Braga left the stadium citing throat pain and was treated at a hospital for heart arrhythmia, before being discharged later.

On 31 March Flamengo went on to defeat Vasco on penalties to claim the club's 8th Taça Rio title. Since Flamengo had already qualified for the Carioca final stage, starters Diego and Gabriel Barbosa rested for both Taça Rio matches in preparation for the Copa Libertadores.

April

On 3 April, in Flamengo's highest-attended home match of the season, the team lost 0–1 to Peñarol in the Copa Libertadores on a late goal by Lucas Viatri. The match represented Peñarol's first victory as a visiting side in their previous sixteen Libertadores matches, dating back to 2013. Gabriel was sent off via a straight red card after a reckless tackle against Rodrigo Rojo. The result dropped Flamengo to second in the group, behind Peñarol on goal differential.

On 6 April, Flamengo qualified for a final against Vasco after Gabriel equalized against Fluminense in the semi-final of the Campeonato Carioca (as the team with the greater overall point total across both phases of the Carioca, Flamengo advanced with a draw).

The day prior to this match, it was confirmed by the governor of Rio de Janeiro that Flamengo and Fluminense would be joint-managers of the Maracanã for six months beginning on 19 April, a deal which allowed the clubs to pay a fixed monthly fee and receive a higher share of matchday revenue than was granted under the previous deal. Because Vasco da Gama was not included in the deal, the president of the club announced that the team would not play their home matches at the Maracanã. This included the first leg of the Carioca final against Flamengo, which was moved to São Januário.

On 11 April, Flamengo hosted San José in the Copa Libertadores and won emphatically by a score of 6–1 with Gabriel serving his red card suspension. The result returned Flamengo to the top of the group, ahead of Peñarol on goal differential.

On 14 and 21 April, Flamengo won both legs of the Caroica final against Vasco by the scoreline 2–0, capturing their record 35th Carioca title. Bruno Henrique scored both goals in the first leg and was the top goalscorer of the Campeonato Carioca.

On 24 April in Quito, Ecuador against LDU, Bruno Henrique scored early before Flamengo conceded a goal in the final seconds of the first half. A draw would have guaranteed Flamengo's qualification to the round of 16 and LDU's elimination. Andrés Chicaiza of LDU scored an excellent goal in the second half to save his team from elimination. The result forced Flamengo to earn at least a draw against Peñarol in Montevideo on the final matchday to guarantee passage. Abel Braga was not present for the match, as CONMEBOL had suspended him for bringing his team out of the dressing room late after halftime against Peñarol.

On 27 April the 2019 Campeonato Brasileiro season began. Flamengo played host to Cruzeiro. Bruno Henrique scored twice and Gabriel scored on a rebound to put the match at 3–1. Legendary Flamengo and Seleção centre-back Juan entered the field for the final time in the closing minutes to mark his retirement from football. In the final play of the match, centre-back Rodrigo Caio suffered a head injury after colliding with Dedé and exited the field in an ambulance. His was discharged from the hospital the following morning but would miss the following league match against Internacional.

May

On 1 May, Flamengo fell to Internacional in Porto Alegre 2–1, conceding the opening goal to former player Paulo Guerrero.

On 2 May, the team was drawn against Corinthians in the Copa do Brasil round of 16, a rematch of the previous edition's semi-final.

On 5 May, in preparation for their crucial last Libertadores group stage match, Flamengo fielded a reserve team against São Paulo in the Brazilian championship and came away with a draw, goal scored by Orlando Berrío.

On 8 May, a victory or draw against Peñarol in Montevideo would guarantee qualification to the knockout stage of the tournament. In the final minutes of the match, substitute Vitinho failed to score on a one-on-one opportunity, but the draw was sufficient to qualify. Pará received two yellow cards in the match and was sent off. LDU's 4–0 victory over San José qualified them and eliminated Peñarol. Flamengo finished top of Group D with 10 points, tied with LDU and Peñarol but ahead on goal differential.

On 12 May, Flamengo fielded their reserve team against Chapecoense in the Maracanã in preparation for their mid-week Copa do Brasil match against Corinthians. Flamengo won 2–1 with goals from Vitinho and Lincoln.

On 13 May, Flamengo was drawn against Ecuadorian club Emelec in the Libertadores round of 16.

On 15 May against Corinthians in the Arena Corinthians, Flamengo maintained high possession and won 1–0, with the goal scored by Willian Arão on a cross from Bruno Henrique.

On 18 May Flamengo debuted their 2019 white alternative kits against Atlético Mineiro at the Independencia. They lost 2–1 off a goal from Yimmi Chará despite having a man advantage for the entire second half after the sending off of Elias. Shortly thereafter, Flamengo's Gavea headquarters was vandalized with graffiti calling for the firing of Abel Braga. President Landim remarked that the graffiti was politically motivated and did not represent the views of most supporters.

On 26 May in a dramatic match against the mixed reserve team of Athletico Paranaense in the Maracanã, Flamengo were trailing 1–2 in the 90th minute. Bruno Henrique and Rodrigo Caio each scored in stoppage time to win 3–2, preserving their home win streak in three league matches.

On 29 May, Abel Braga officially resigned as manager of Flamengo citing external pressure from fans and lack of support from the board. Braga served as manager for five months with a record of 18 wins, 7 draws and 5 losses. Under his management, Flamengo scored 56 and conceded 27 goals in 30 official matches.

On 29 May, it was confirmed that striker Fernando Uribe would transfer to Santos. Since July 2018, he scored 8 goals in 37 appearances for Flamengo.

June

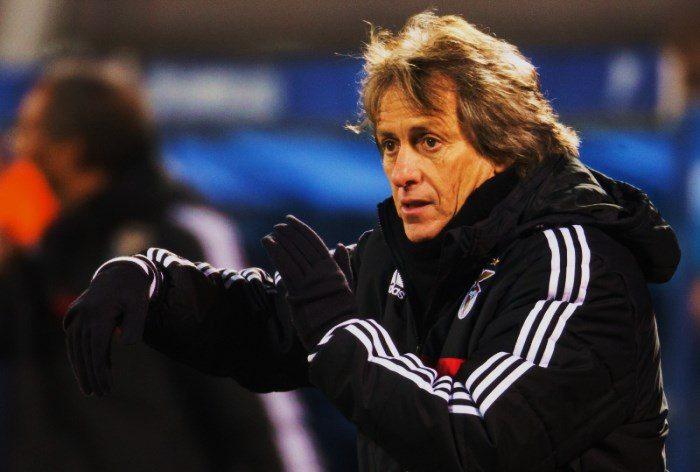
Jorge Jesus, signed on 1 June 2019.

On 1 June, Flamengo confirmed the signing of Portuguese manager Jorge Jesus. Jesus signed a one-year contract and would assume management of the team in mid-June after the first week of the Copa América break. Under interim manager Marcelo Salles, Flamengo won three matches and drew once, against Fluminense.

On 4 June, the club defeated Corinthians in the Maracanã 1–0 to advance to the quarter-finals of the Copa do Brasil. In the Brazilian championship, Flamengo defeated Fortaleza and CSA. Jorge Jesus was a spectator for the match against Fluminense and assumed his managerial role on 20 June.

Three Flamengo players joined their national teams for the Copa América: Gustavo Cuéllar of Colombia, Giorgian de Arrascaeta of Uruguay, and Miguel Trauco of Peru. Cuéllar scored a goal against Paraguay. Trauco's Peru advanced to the final against Brazil, and Trauco was named to the Team of the Tournament by CONMEBOL.

On 9 June, Flamengo confirmed the signing of Brazilian right-back Rafinha as a free agent after his eight-year career at Bayern Munich. He would be officially presented at the club on 24 June. Rafinha signed a two-year contract, and contacted Miguel Trauco to request the use of his shirt number 13, the same number Rafinha wore for Bayern.

On 20 June, Flamengo came to an agreement with French club Lyon for the transfer of midfielder Jean Lucas, on loan with Santos. Flamengo received €6.35m of the €8m transfer.

On 29 June Flamengo played a training match against Madureira. It served as the first match managed by Jorge Jesus.

July

On 9 July, promising midfielder Ronaldo was loaned to Bahia for the remainder of the year.

On 10 July in the Brazilian managerial debut of Jorge Jesus, Flamengo tied 1–1 against Athletico Paranaense in the Arena da Baixada for the Copa do Brasil quarter-finals, with the equalizing goal scored by Gabriel. The match was marked by several uses of VAR.

On 11 July Flamengo announced the signing of Spanish central defender Pablo Marí, previously on loan with Deportivo La Coruña from Manchester City. He signed with Flamengo through December 2022.

On 12 July, Flamengo closed a deal with Roma for Brazilian midfielder Gerson. The former Fluminense player was transferred for €11.8m in exchange for 100% of the player's economic rights, making him the most expensive Brazilian player ever signed by a Brazilian club. Gerson signed a contract through 2023.

On 14 July in Flamengo's return to the Brasileirão they defeated Goiás 6–1 in a sold-out Maracanã with a hat-trick from Arrascaeta. Rafinha made his Flamengo debut.

On 17 July Flamengo faced Athletico Paranaense in the return leg of the Copa do Brasil quarter-final. Gabriel scored in the 2nd half but Rony of Athletico responded. Tied 1–1, the match was decided by penalties. Diego took the first penalty and his shot was saved. Athletico Paranaense went on to win the shootout 3–1 and eliminate Flamengo from the competition.

On 19 July Flamengo released their 30-man roster for the Copa Libertadores round of 16. New signings Rafinha, Pablo Marí, João Lucas, and Gerson, along with Lincoln, were the additions.

On 21 July Flamengo played to a 1–1 draw against Corinthians. Clayson converted a penalty after Berrío fouled Vágner Love, and Gabriel scored a goal initially ruled offside but reversed by VAR.

On 23 July, Flamengo announced the signing of Filipe Luís after his farewell from eight seasons at Atlético Madrid. Because the signing was made after 9 July, he was not eligible to participate in the Copa do Brasil.

On 24 July the team faced Emelec in Guayaquil and suffered a 2–0 loss in the opening leg of the Libertadores round of 16. With Éverton Ribeiro, de Arrascaeta and Vitinho injured, Jorge Jesus started Rafinha as a winger, with Diego in front of Gerson and Arão in the midfield. Rodinei occupied the right-back spot. Emelec scored an early goal and led at halftime. Early in the second half, Vega of Emelec received a straight red card for a high-kick to the face of Rafinha. Flamengo made three substitutions shortly after, bringing on Lincoln and Lucas Silva for the attack. Twenty minutes after the red card, Diego left the field with a serious ankle fracture that would require surgery. Both teams playing with 10 men, Emelec scored again late in the match.

On 28 July, Flamengo faced rivals Botafogo in the 12th round of the league and won 3–2 after conceding the first goal. Gabriel scored in his fifth consecutive league match. Rodrigo Caio and Lincoln both exited the match with injuries. After the match, Jorge Jesus confirmed that the transfer of Léo Duarte to Milan had been completed. The centre-back left Flamengo for €10 million. The club had 75% of his economic rights.

On 30 July Flamengo released the contract of right-back Pará, leaving him free to sign with Santos.

On 31 July Flamengo hosted Emelec in the return leg of the Copa Libertadores round of 16. Trailing 0–2 on aggregate, Gabriel converted a penalty after Rafinha is fouled by Bagüi, and later scores from close range after recovering a pass from Bruno Henrique. Reinier makes his senior team debut in the 2nd half. In the penalty shootout, all four Flamengo players score. Diego Alves saved Dixon Arroyo's shot and Nicolás Queiróz hit the crossbar.

August

On 1 August, left-back Miguel Trauco's departure to French club Saint-Étienne for R$2.5m (approximately €600k) was confirmed. His contract was set to expire at the end of the season.

On 4 August, Flamengo fell to Bahia 0–3 on a hat-trick from Gilberto. Filipe Luís made his Flamengo debut. Flamengo debuted their 2019-2020 alternative kits in the match: dark grey with lime green details.

On 10 August Flamengo defeated Grêmio 3–1 in the Maracanã. de Arrascaeta recorded a goal and an assist. Grêmio played a team of mostly reserves in preparation for their mid-week Copa do Brasil semi-final.

On 15 August, Flamengo announced that they had ceased negotiations with Italian striker Mario Balotelli.

On 16 August, Bruno Henrique was called up to the Brazil National Team for the first time for a pair of friendlies in September. Arrascaeta was called up to the Uruguay National Team for the same window. The club also unveiled their list of players registered for the Copa Libertadores quarter-finals. With three players transferred out (Pará, Trauco and Léo Duarte), Filipe Luís and Matheus Dantas were added to the roster.

On 17 August, Flamengo defeated Vasco da Gama 4–1 in Brasilia in the highest attended match of the Brasileirao season so far. The victory moved Flamengo into 2nd place.

On 21 August, Flamengo faced Internacional in the home leg of the Copa Libertadores quarter-finals. Bruno Henrique scored twice in the seconds half, minutes apart, to secure a 2–0 victory.

On 23 August the club released an official statement that Gustavo Cuéllar would be suspended from club activities indefinitely for refusing to travel with the team for the following league match, citing family matters. It was reported that Cuéllar had been seeking to exit Flamengo on an offer from Al-Hilal.

On 25 August, Flamengo defeated Ceará 3–0 in Fortaleza to assume leadership of the Brazilian Championship. de Arrascaeta scored a bicycle kick goal in stoppage time, assisted by Rafinha.

On 26 August, an official announcement from the club declared that Cuéllar would be re-integrated into the team and would travel for the second leg of the Copa Libertadores quarter-final against Internacional.

On 27 August, Orlando Berrío was called to the Colombia national team for September friendlies.

On 28 August, Flamengo qualified for the Copa Libertadores semi-final after drawing against Internacional. Rodrigo Lindoso scored a header from a set-piece, and Gabriel equalized on a counter-attack assisted by Bruno Henrique. Flamengo advanced with a 3–1 aggregate score to their first Copa Libertadores semi-final since 1984.

On 30 August, Gustavo Cuéllar was officially announced as a new signing by Al-Hilal. Flamengo reopened negotiations with the club and the player was signed for a reported fee of €7.5m. Cuéllar made 170 appearances for Flamengo since 2016.

September

On 1 September, Flamengo defeated Palmeiras 3–0. It was Flamengo's first victory against Palmeiras since May 2014. Manager Luiz Felipe Scolari was dismissed by Palmeiras following the loss.

On 7 September, Flamengo defeated Avaí 3–0 in the Mané Garrincha Stadium in Brasília. Reinier scored his first goal for the senior team.

On 14 September Flamengo hosted Santos for their final match of the first half of the Brasileirão. Gabriel scored the only goal of the match, a chip shot from outside the penalty area. Flamengo maintained their lead in the league and Santos fell to third place.

On 20 September, Tite called up Gabriel and Rodrigo Caio for a pair of national team friendlies against Senegal and Nigeria in October. Giorgian de Arrascaeta and Orlando Berrío were also called to their national teams for the same window, all four becoming unavailable against Atlético Mineiro and Athletico Paranaense. As a result, Flamengo requested that Reinier not be called up for the 2019 FIFA U-17 World Cup to be played in Brazil during that same period.

On 21 September the club faced Cruzeiro in Belo Horizonte. Giorgian de Arrascaeta scored against his former club, and Gabriel scored to win 1–2. The win set a club record of seven straight victories in the national league (Flamengo had previously won six straight in 1978, 1982, and 2015).

On 25 September Flamengo hosted Internacional at the Maracanã. Inter had two key players sent off with red cards early: Bruno Vieira in the 18th minute for a foul against Gabriel, and former Flamengo player Paolo Guerrero for complaining after a collision with Rodrigo Caio at the end of the first half. Gabriel converted his penalty, and de Arrascaeta and Bruno Henrique also scored to win 3–1. The result extended the club's record winning streak to eight matches.

On 28 September Flamengo faced São Paulo at home in Fernando Diniz's managerial debut. Starters Gerson, Rafinha and Filipe Luís entered in the 2nd half, but the match ended in a scoreless draw. This was Flamengo's first failure to win at the Maracanã in 2019 league play. Flamengo moved to four points clear of Palmeiras in first place.

October

On 2 October, Flamengo faced Grêmio in Porto Alegre for the first leg of the Copa Libertadores semi-final. Flamengo had three goals annulled by VAR and finished tired 1–1 with a goal from Bruno Henrique.

On 6 October, Flamengo faced last-place Chapecoense away. With Gabriel suspended and Arrascaeta and Filipe Luís injured, the team managed to win 1–0 via a goal from Bruno Henrique.

On 10 October, Flamengo defeated Atlético Mineiro 3–1 at the Maracanã with a goal and two assists from Vitinho to open up an eight-point lead in the league.

On 13 October, the team traveled to the Arena da Baixada to face Athletico Paranaense. An early penalty decision in favor of Athletico was withdrawn after VAR review, and Bruno Henrique scored another brace to secure a 2–0 victory, breaking a 45-year spell of Flamengo's failure to win against Athletico Paranaense as a visitor.

On 16 October, Flamengo came from behind to defeat Fortaleza 2–1 at the Castelão with a goal by Reinier. Fortaleza challenged the result on account of a second ball entering the field during the match-winning goal, but the appeal was denied.

On 23 October in the second leg of the Copa Libertadores semi-final at the Maracanã, Flamengo advanced against Grêmio with an astonishing 5–0 victory. The result matched the largest ever margin of victory in the Libertadores between two Brazilian clubs. Flamengo advanced 6–1 on aggregate to their first Copa Libertadores final since their championship in 1981.

On 25 October, the selection for the Brazil national team's November friendlies against Argentina and South Korea were made. Flamengo reportedly requested that none of their players be called up, and none were. Manager Tite expressed interest in Gerson.

On 27 October the team defeated CSA 1–0. The match attendance at the Maracanã set the 2019 Brasileirão record with paid attendance of 65,649.

On 31 October, Flamengo drew 2–2 against Goiás. Gabriel scored a goal and received a yellow card in the match, becoming disqualified from the following league match against Corinthians.

November

Copa Libertadores Final starting lineup

On 3 November, Bruno Henrique scored a hat-trick as part of a 4–1 home rout against Corinthians. Diego Alves returned from injury and was available for the match.

On 5 November in reaction to the ongoing civil protests in Chile, CONMEBOL, Flamengo and River Plate agreed to relocate the Copa Libertadores final from Santiago to Lima, Peru.

On 7 November, with de Arrascaeta injured Flamengo defeated Botafogo 0–1 in a challenging match with a late game-winner from Lincoln.

On 9 November, Reinier extended his contract with Flamengo through 2024 with a reduction in his release clause from €70 to €35 million.

On 10 November, Flamengo defeated Bahia 3–1 at the Maracanã.

On 13 November, Flamengo played to a difficult 4–4 draw against rivals Vasco da Gama. Éverton Ribeiro scored in the first 40 seconds, and Marrony equalized in the 34th minute. Trailing 2–3, Bruno Henrique scored a brace to take the lead before Ribamar equalized in stoppage time. This was Bruno Henrique's fourth brace in the 2019 Brasileirão in addition to three braces in the Campeonato Carioca.

On 17 November Flamengo defeated Grêmio 0–1 in the Campeonato Brasileiro, breaking the club's 21st Century undefeated streak record of 25 matches (set in 2011). Gabriel scored the lone goal of the match and received a red card, becoming the most booked player of the 2019 Série A season. The victory also set the Campeonato Brasileiro Série A record for most wins in 38-match round-robin season with 25, breaking the previous record of 24 wins held by 2014 Cruzeiro, 2015 Corinthians, and 2016 Palmeiras.

On 20 November, the team embarked to Lima for the Copa Libertadores final and released their list of available players.

On 23 November, Flamengo entered the Estadio Monumental in Lima for their historic single-match Copa Libertadores final against defending champions River Plate. Managed by Marcelo Gallardo, River controlled play for much of the first half. In the 14th minute, Rafael Santos Borré of River Plate scored after Willian Arão and Gerson failed to clear a ball in the penalty area. Flamengo trailed 0–1 at halftime. In the second half, Flamengo's play improved as Gabriel continued to be well-marked by River's defense. In the 57th minute Flamengo shockingly failed to equalize, as Éverton Ribeiro shot from inside the penalty area but was denied by goalkeeper Franco Armani. In the 65th minute, captain Diego was substituted on for Gerson in the midfield. Vitinho entered for Arão in the 85th minute. Still trailing by one goal, Diego and de Arrascaeta pressured Lucas Pratto to force a turnover. de Arrascaeta found Bruno Henrique who advanced into the attacking half before returning a through-ball to de Arrascaeta in the penalty area where he provided the assist to Gabriel's equalizing goal in the 89th minute. Minutes later, Diego lifted a deep forward pass into the area towards Gabriel. River Plate centre-back Javier Pinola failed to clear the ball and Gabriel scored with his first touch to complete the historic comeback. After trailing for much of the match, Flamengo won their second Copa Libertadores.

Gabriel Barbosa was named Man of the Match and finished as the top goalscorer of the Copa Libertadores with nine goals. Bruno Henrique was named best player of the tournament. The victory qualified Flamengo to their first FIFA Club World Cup in December in Qatar, as well as the 2020 Recopa Sudamericana against Copa Sudamericana champions Independiente del Valle. The result also likely qualified Flamengo to the expanded FIFA Club World Cup, which was to be played in China.

On 24 November, fewer than 24 hours after the finish in the Copa Libertadores, Flamengo clinched their sixth Campeonato Brasileiro championship as a result of Grêmio's 1–2 victory over Palmeiras. With four league matches still to play, Flamengo became the first Brazilian team since Pelé's 1962 and 1963 Santos teams to win the Copa Libertadores and Campeonato Brasileiro in the same season. With the championship, Flamengo qualified for the 2020 Supercopa do Brasil against Copa do Brasil champions Athletico Paranaense.

On 27 November with the league title already won, Flamengo took the field at the Maracanã against Ceará. Bruno Henrique scored his second hat-trick of the season en route to a 4–1 victory. The team received the Série A trophy on the field after the match. The victory set a new points record in the era of the league's current format (2006–present) with 84, surpassing Corinthians' 2015 total of 81.

December

On 1 December, Flamengo traveled to the Allianz Parque to face Palmeiras for the 36th round of the Brazilian league. Amidst public safety concerns and fear of clashes between supporters groups, CBF upheld the request from São Paulo police that visiting supporters not be permitted in the stadium, a decision which Flamengo opposed. Flamengo opened the scoring early with a goal from Arrascaeta and two from Gabriel, defeating Palmeiras 1–3. This was Flamengo's first victory at the Allianz Parque since its completion in 2014. The victory set another league record in the post-2006 era: 80 goals scored in the campaign surpassed Cruzeiro's mark of 77 from 2013. Additionally, Gabriel Barbosa broke the league goal-scoring record in the 20-team era with his 24th goal of the season, passing Jonas from 2010 Grêmio and Borges from 2011 Santos.

On 4 December Flamengo released their list of players for the Club World Cup.

On 5 December in their final home match of the season, Flamengo defeated already relegated Avaí by a score of 6–1 with a mostly reserve lineup. Gabriel scored his 25th goal of the season and 17 year-old Reinier scored a second-half brace. Flamengo finished league play undefeated at home.

On 8 December on the final matchday of the season, Flamengo suffered their worst loss of the year falling 4–0 to league runners-up Santos at the Vila Belmiro. With the defeat, Flamengo equaled the record for fewest losses in a 38-match season with four, a mark set by São Paulo in 2006 and Palmeiras in 2018.

On 9 December, several Flamengo players were honored at the 2019 Bola de Prata and Prêmio Craque do Brasileirão awards. Gabriel received the Bola de Ouro for best player of the season, and Bruno Henrique received the "Craque do Brasileirão" award for player of the year. Jorge Jesus was honored as the best manager of the year by both awarding bodies.

On 17 December Flamengo made their Club World Cup debut against AFC Champions League winners Al Hilal of Saudi Arabia in Doha, Qatar. After conceding the first goal to Salem Al-Dawsari, Flamengo shone in the second half with a goal and assist from Bruno Henrique, and a late own goal against Al-Hilal to win 3–1 and secure a place in the final.

On 18 December Liverpool defeated Monterrey in the opposite semi-final to confirm a rematch of the 1981 Intercontinental Cup against Flamengo.

On 21 December, Flamengo and Liverpool entered the Khalifa International Stadium for the FIFA Club World Cup final and Flamengo's final match of the 2019 season. Forward Roberto Firmino of Liverpool nearly scored in the first minute of play. After resisting early chances, Flamengo matched Liverpool's play with chances from Bruno Henrique and maintained nearly 60% possession in the 1st half. In the 2nd half Firmino again came close, with a shot off the post. Éverton Ribeiro and de Arrascaeta came off for Diego and Vitinho. In 2nd half stoppage time, Liverpool was awarded a penalty after Rafinha fouled Sadio Mané on the edge of the penalty area, but the decision was reversed by VAR and the match went into extra time tied 0–0. Liverpool continued to pressure and finally scored in the 9th minute: Mané found Firmino in the box who scored the match's only goal. Flamengo was unable to respond, coming close with an opportunity from substitute Lincoln in the second period of extra time. Liverpool won 1–0, claiming their first Club World Cup with Firmino being named Man of the Match. Bruno Henrique received the Silver Ball of the tournament behind Mohamed Salah of Liverpool's Golden Ball.

On 31 December Gabriel was elected "Rey del Fútbol de América" ("South American Footballer of the Year") by Uruguayan paper El País. Teammates Bruno Henrique and de Arrascaeta finished second and third in voting.

== Pre-season and friendlies ==
=== Florida Cup ===
Flamengo won the 2019 Florida Cup in their first time competing in the annual friendly competition. São Paulo also participated but the two Brazilian clubs were not scheduled to meet.

Goals and red cards are shown.

10 January 2019 Florida Cup	Ajax (Netherlands)	2–2 (3–4 p)	(Brazil) Flamengo	Orlando, United States
19:15 UTC−5	Huntelaar 16'; Labyad 34'	Report	Uribe 19', 43'	Stadium: Orlando City Stadium; Referee: Estaban Rosano (United States)
	Penalties
	Labyad (penalty scored); Traoré (penalty scored); De Wit (penalty scored); Veltman (penalty missed); Magallán (penalty missed)		(penalty scored) Robert Piris Da Motta; (penalty scored) Rodinei; (penalty scored) Trauco; (penalty scored) Berrío

12 January 2019 Florida Cup	Flamengo (Brazil)	1–0	(Germany) Eintracht Frankfurt	Orlando, United States
16:15 UTC−5	Jean Lucas 40'	Report	Abraham (red card) 25'	Stadium: Orlando City Stadium; Referee: Madcid Coric (United States)

=== Friendlies ===
Flamengo scheduled a training match during the Copa América interval against Madureira. It served as the first match managed by Jorge Jesus.

29 June 2019 Friendly	Flamengo	3–1	Madureira	Rio de Janeiro
11:00 UTC−3	Diego 9'; Vitinho 18', 75'	Report	Ygor Catatau 87'	Stadium: Gávea

== Competitions ==
=== Overview ===
Competition	First match	Last match	Starting round	Final position	Record							
Competition	First match	Last match	Starting round	Final position	Pld	W	D	L	GF	GA	GD	Win %
Brasileiro Série A	27 April 2019	8 December 2019	Matchday 1	Winners	38	28	6	4	86	37	+49	73.68
Copa do Brasil	15 May 2019	17 July 2019	Round of 16	Quarter-final	4	2	2	0	4	2	+2	50.00
Campeonato Carioca	20 January 2019	21 April 2019	Matchday 1	Winners	17	11	5	1	33	13	+20	64.71
Copa Libertadores	5 March 2019	23 November 2019	Group stage	Winners	13	7	3	3	24	10	+14	53.85
FIFA Club World Cup	17 December 2019	21 December 2019	Semi-final	Runners-up	2	1	0	1	3	2	+1	50.00
Total					74	49	16	9	150	64	+86	66.22

Last updated: 21 December 2019
Source: Competitions

=== Campeonato Carioca ===
The draw for the 2019 Campeonato Carioca was conducted on 16 October 2018. Flamengo was drawn into group C with Botafogo.

==== Taça Guanabara ====
Pos	Team	Pld	W	D	L	GF	GA	GD	Pts	Qualification
1	Flamengo	5	4	1	0	12	4	+8	13	Advance to semifinals
2	Resende	5	2	2	1	7	4	+3	8	Advance to semifinals
3	Bangu	5	2	1	2	4	5	−1	7	
4	Boavista	5	2	0	3	4	9	−5	6	
5	Botafogo	5	1	1	3	5	6	−1	4	
6	Cabofriense	5	1	1	3	4	8	−4	4	

Source: FERJ
Rules for classification: 1) points; 2) wins; 3) goal difference; 4) goals scored; 5) head-to-head results; 6) least red cards received; 7) least yellow cards received; 8) draw.

Goals and red cards are shown.

20 January 2019 1	Flamengo	2–1	Bangu	Rio de Janeiro
17:00 UTC−2	Diego 16' (pen.); Rhodolfo 54'	Report	Lessa 3'; Dias (red card) 14'	Stadium: Maracanã; Attendance: 46,472; Referee: Bruno Arleu

23 January 2019 2	Resende	1–1	Flamengo	Volta Redonda
19:15 UTC−2	Joseph 18'	Report	Dourado 22'	Stadium: Raulino de Oliveira; Attendance: 14,314; Referee: Rodrigo Nunes de Sá

26 January 2019 3	Botafogo	1–2	Flamengo	Rio de Janeiro
17:00 UTC−2	João Paulo 25'	Report	Bruno Henrique 64', 71'	Stadium: Nilton Santos; Attendance: 6,268; Referee: Maurício Machado Coelho Júnior

29 January 2019 4	Flamengo	3–1	Boavista	Rio de Janeiro
21:30 UTC−2	Dourado 40'; Uribe 77'; Rodrigo Caio 89'	Report	Arthur 50'	Stadium: Maracanã; Attendance: 34,080; Referee: Rodrigo Carvalhes de Miranda

3 February 2019 5	Flamengo	4–0	Cabofriense	Rio de Janeiro
17:00 UTC−2	Arão 9'; Diego 57'; de Arrascaeta 86'; Bruno Henrique 90+2'	Report		Stadium: Maracanã; Attendance: 49,365; Referee: Alexandre Vargas Tavares de Jesus

=== Semifinal ===
14 February 2019	Flamengo	0–1	Fluminense	Rio de Janeiro
20:30 UTC−2		Report	Luciano 90+3'	Stadium: Maracanã; Attendance: 54,544; Referee: Rodrigo Carvalhães de Miranda

==== Taça Rio ====
Pos	Team	Pld	W	D	L	GF	GA	GD	Pts	Qualification
1	Bangu	6	5	0	1	9	3	+6	15	Advance to semifinals
2	Flamengo	6	4	2	0	13	5	+8	14	Advance to semifinals
3	Cabofriense	6	3	2	1	10	4	+6	11	
4	Botafogo	6	2	3	1	10	7	+3	9	
5	Boavista	6	2	2	2	7	9	−2	8	
6	Resende	6	0	2	4	3	9	−6	2	

Source: FERJ
Rules for classification: 1) points; 2) wins; 3) goal difference; 4) goals scored; 5) head-to-head results; 6) least red cards received; 7) least yellow cards received; 8) draw.

Goals and red cards are shown.

24 February 2019 1	Flamengo	4–1	Americano	Rio de Janeiro
17:00 UTC−3	Vitinho 2', 49'; Gabriel 52'; Diego 86'	Report	Espinho 83'	Stadium: Maracanã; Attendance: 26,405; Referee: Marcelo de Lima Henrique

28 February 2019 2	Portuguesa	1–3	Flamengo	Volta Redonda
21:00 UTC−3	Patryck 79'	Report	Bruno Henrique 5'; Gabriel 6', 69'	Stadium: Raulino de Oliveira; Attendance: 5,496; Referee: Philip George Bennett

9 March 2019 3	Vasco da Gama	1–1	Flamengo	Rio de Janeiro
19:00 UTC−3	López 90+5' (pen.)	Report	de Arrascaeta 48'; Bruno Henrique (red card) 90+8'	Stadium: Maracanã; Attendance: 29,226; Referee: Wagner do Nascimento

16 March 2019 4	Flamengo	0–0	Volta Redonda	Rio de Janeiro
19:00 UTC−3		Report		Stadium: Maracanã; Attendance: 26,603; Referee: Pathrice Wallace Correia Maia

19 March 2019 5	Madureira	0–2	Flamengo	Rio de Janeiro
20:30 UTC−3		Report	Gabriel 45', 80'	Stadium: Maracanã; Attendance: 17,392; Referee: Mauricio Coelho Junior

24 March 2019 6	Flamengo	3–2	Fluminense	Rio de Janeiro
16:00 UTC−3	Bruno Henrique 14', 51'; Gabriel 58'	Report	Dodi 64'; João Pedro 72'; Pablo Dyego (red card) 90+3'	Stadium: Maracanã; Attendance: 48,385; Referee: João Batista de Arruda

=== Semifinal ===
27 March 2019	Fluminense	1–2	Flamengo	Rio de Janeiro
21:30 UTC−3	González 61' (pen.); Ganso (red card) 90+6'	Report	Renê 30'; Bruno Henrique (red card) 45+4'; Ribeiro 90+5' (pen.)	Stadium: Maracanã; Attendance: 24,614; Referee: Marcelo de Lima Henrique

=== Final ===
31 March 2019	Vasco da Gama	1–1 (1–3 p)	Flamengo	Rio de Janeiro
16:00 UTC−3	Reis 55'	Report	de Arrascaeta 90+3'	Stadium: Maracanã; Attendance: 38,787; Referee: Rodrigo Nunes de Sá
	Penalties
	Barcelos (penalty scored); Rossi (penalty missed); Reis (penalty missed); Werley (penalty missed)		(penalty scored) Vitinho; (penalty missed) Rodinei; (penalty scored) de Arrascaeta; (penalty scored) Uribe

==== Final stage ====
6 April 2019 Semifinal	Flamengo	1–1	Fluminense	Rio de Janeiro
19:00 UTC−3	Gabriel 69'	Report	Gilberto 45'	Stadium: Maracanã; Attendance: 46,128; Referee: Bruno Arleu de Araújo
Note: Flamengo advance to the finals with a draw as the higher seeded team.

=== Final ===
14 April 2019 1st leg	Vasco da Gama	0–2	Flamengo	Rio de Janeiro
16:00 UTC−3		Report	Bruno Henrique 54', 76'	Stadium: Nilton Santos; Attendance: 10,854; Referee: Rodrigo Nunes de Sá

21 April 2019 2nd leg	Flamengo	2–0 (4–0 agg.)	Vasco da Gama	Rio de Janeiro
16:00 UTC−3	Arão 16'; Vitinho 83'	Report	Werley (red card) 87'	Stadium: Maracanã; Attendance: 52,398; Referee: Rodrigo Carvalhaes

=== Copa Libertadores ===
The group stage draw for the 2019 Copa Libertadores was conducted on 17 December 2018. Flamengo were drawn into Group D with Peñarol, Liga de Quito, and a Bolivian team unknown at the time of the draw that would be San José.

==== Group stage ====
Pos	Team	Pld	W	D	L	GF	GA	GD	Pts	Qualification	FLA	LDQ	PEÑ	SJO
1	(Brazil) Flamengo	6	3	1	2	11	5	+6	10	Round of 16	—	3–1	0–1	6–1
2	(Ecuador) LDU Quito	6	3	1	2	12	8	+4	10	Round of 16	2–1	—	2–0	4–0
3	(Uruguay) Peñarol	6	3	1	2	7	5	+2	10	Copa Sudamericana	0–0	1–0	—	4–0
4	(Bolivia) San José	6	1	1	4	7	19	−12	4		0–1	3–3	3–1	—

Source: CONMEBOL
Rules for classification: Group stage tiebreakers

Goals and red cards are shown.

5 March 2019 1	San José (Bolivia)	0–1	(Brazil) Flamengo	Oruro, Bolivia
18:15 UTC−4		Report	Gabriel 59'	Stadium: Estadio Jesús Bermúdez; Referee: Néstor Pitana (Argentina)

13 March 2019 2	Flamengo (Brazil)	3–1	(Ecuador) LDU Quito	Rio de Janeiro, Brazil
21:30 UTC−3	Ribeiro 9'; Gabriel 69'; Uribe 81'	Report	Borja 90+2' (pen.)	Stadium: Maracanã; Attendance: 62,440; Referee: Germán Delfino (Argentina)

3 April 2019 3	Flamengo (Brazil)	0–1	(Uruguay) Peñarol	Rio de Janeiro, Brazil
21:30 UTC−3	Gabriel (red card) 75'	Report	Viatri 88'	Stadium: Maracanã; Attendance: 66,716; Referee: Patricio Loustau (Argentina)

11 April 2019 4	Flamengo (Brazil)	6–1	(Bolivia) San José	Rio de Janeiro, Brazil
21:00 UTC−3	Diego 3'; Ribeiro 31', 80' de Arrascaeta 57'; Vitinho 84' (pen.); Gutiérrez 88' (o.g.)	Report	Toco (red card) 5'; Saucedo 19'	Stadium: Maracanã; Attendance: 64,814; Referee: Piero Maza (Chile)

24 April 2019 5	LDU Quito (Ecuador)	2–1	(Brazil) Flamengo	Quito, Ecuador
19:30 UTC−5	Anangonó 45+3'; Chicaiza 73'	Report	Bruno Henrique 19'	Stadium: Casa Blanca; Attendance: 16,325; Referee: Néstor Pitana (Argentina)

8 May 2019 6	Peñarol (Uruguay)	0–0	(Brazil) Flamengo	Montevideo, Uruguay
21:30 UTC−3	González (red card) 90+5'	Report	Pará (red card) 64'	Stadium: Estadio Campeón del Siglo; Referee: Roberto Tobar (Chile)

==== Knockout stage ====
===== Round of 16 =====
The draw for the knockout stages of the Copa Libertadores was held on 13 May.

Goals and red cards are shown.

24 July 2019 1st leg	Emelec (Ecuador)	2–0	(Brazil) Flamengo	Guayaquil, Ecuador
19:30 UTC−5	Godoy 10'; Vega (red card) 54'; Caicedo 79'	Report		Stadium: Estadio George Capwell; Referee: Fernando Rapallini (Argentina)

31 July 2019 2nd leg	Flamengo (Brazil)	2–0 (2–2 agg.) (4–2 p)	(Ecuador) Emelec	Rio de Janeiro, Brazil
21:30 UTC−3	Gabriel 10' (pen.), 19'	Report		Stadium: Maracanã; Attendance: 67,664; Referee: Néstor Pitana (Argentina)
	Penalties
	de Arrascaeta (penalty scored); Bruno Henrique (penalty scored); Renê (penalty scored); Rafinha (penalty scored)		(penalty scored) Angulo; (penalty scored) Cortez; (penalty missed) Arroyo; (penalty missed) Queiróz

===== Quarter-finals =====
Goals and red cards are shown.

21 August 2019 1st leg	Flamengo (Brazil)	2–0	(Brazil) Internacional	Rio de Janeiro, Brazil
21:30 UTC−3	Bruno Henrique 75', 79'	Report		Stadium: Maracanã; Attendance: 66,366; Referee: Roberto Tobar (Chile)

28 August 2019 2nd leg	Internacional (Brazil)	1–1 (1–3 agg.)	(Brazil) Flamengo	Porto Alegre, Brazil
21:30 UTC−3	Lindoso 62'	Report	Gabriel 85'	Stadium: Beira-Rio; Attendance: 49,614; Referee: Patricio Loustau (Argentina)

===== Semi-finals =====
Goals and red cards are shown.

2 October 2019 1st leg	Grêmio (Brazil)	1–1	(Brazil) Flamengo	Porto Alegre, Brazil
21:30 UTC−3	Pepê 88'	Report	Bruno Henrique 69'	Stadium: Arena do Grêmio; Attendance: 51,406; Referee: Néstor Pitana (Argentina)

23 October 2019 2nd leg	Flamengo (Brazil)	5–0 (6–1 agg.)	(Brazil) Grêmio	Rio de Janeiro, Brazil
21:30 UTC−3	Bruno Henrique 42'; Gabriel 46', 56' (pen.); Marí 67'; Rodrigo Caio 71'	Report		Stadium: Maracanã; Attendance: 69,981; Referee: Patricio Loustau (Argentina)

===== Final =====
In August 2018 the location of the 2019 Copa Libertadores Final was chosen to be the Estadio Nacional in Santiago, Chile. However, due to the ongoing Chilean protests, the match was moved to Lima, Peru on 5 November 2019.

Goals and red cards are shown.

23 November 2019 Final	Flamengo (Brazil)	2–1	(Argentina) River Plate	Lima, Peru
15:00 UTC−5	Gabriel 89', 90+2'; Gabriel (red card) 90+5'	Report	Borré 14'; Palacios (red card) 90+5'	Stadium: Estadio Monumental; Attendance: 65,000; Referee: Roberto Tobar (Chile)

=== Campeonato Brasileiro ===
The Campeonato Brasileiro provisional schedule was released by CBF on 22 February. Match dates are subject to change. League play paused for one month between rounds 9 and 10 for the 2019 Copa América hosted in Brazil.

==== League table ====
Pos	Team	Pld	W	D	L	GF	GA	GD	Pts	Qualification or relegation
1	Flamengo (C)	38	28	6	4	86	37	+49	90	Qualification for Copa Libertadores group stage (Note: Flamengo qualified for the Copa Libertadores group stage by winning the 2019 Copa Libertadores. Athletico Paranaense qualified for the Copa Libertadores group stage by winning the 2019 Copa do Brasil.)
2	Santos	38	22	8	8	60	33	+27	74	Qualification for Copa Libertadores group stage
3	Palmeiras	38	21	11	6	61	32	+29	74	Qualification for Copa Libertadores group stage
4	Grêmio	38	19	8	11	64	39	+25	65	Qualification for Copa Libertadores group stage
5	Athletico Paranaense	38	18	10	10	51	32	+19	64	Qualification for Copa Libertadores group stage

Source: CBF
Rules for classification: 1) points; 2) wins; 3) goal difference; 4) goals scored; 5) head-to-head results; 6) least red cards received; 7) least yellow cards received; 8) draw.
(C) Champions

==== Results by round ====
Round	1	2	3	4	5	6	7	8	9	10	11	12	13	14	15	16	17	18	19	20	21	22	23	24	25	26	27	28	29	30	31	32	33	34	35	36	37	38
Ground	H	A	A	H	A	H	H*	A*	A*	H	A	H	A	H	A*	A	H	A*	H	A	H	H	A	H	A	A	H*	H	A*	H	A	H	A	H	H	A	H	A
Result	W	L	D	W	L	W	W	D	W	W	D	W	L	W	W	W	W	W	W	W	W	D	W	W	W	W	W	W	D	W	W	W	D	W	W	W	W	L
Position	4	7	9	7	9	6	4	5	3	3	3	3	3	3	2	1	1	1	1	1	1	1	1	1	1	1	1	1	1	1	1	1	1	1	1	1	1	1

Updated to match(es) played on 8 December 2019. Source: Matches
A = Away; H = Home; W = Win; D = Draw; L = Loss

==== Matches ====
Goals and red cards are shown.

27 April 2019 1	Flamengo	3–1	Cruzeiro	Rio de Janeiro
21:00 UTC−3	Bruno Henrique 41', 67'; Gabriel 90'	Report	Rocha 40'; Murilo (red card) 85'	Stadium: Maracanã; Attendance: 35,016; Referee: Anderson Daronco

1 May 2019 2	Internacional	2–1	Flamengo	Porto Alegre
16:00 UTC−3	Guerrero 5'; Sarrafiore 77'	Report	de Arrascaeta 60'	Stadium: Beira-Rio; Attendance: 40,588; Referee: Flavio Rodrigues de Souza

5 May 2019 3	São Paulo	1–1	Flamengo	São Paulo
16:00 UTC−3	Tchê Tchê 83'	Report	Berrío 8'	Stadium: Morumbi; Attendance: 38,749; Referee: Ricardo Marques Ribeiro

12 May 2019 4	Flamengo	2–1	Chapecoense	Rio de Janeiro
11:00 UTC−3	Vitinho 8'; Lincoln 51'	Report	Gum 90+2'	Stadium: Maracanã; Attendance: 61,023; Referee: Jean Pierre Gonçalves Lima

18 May 2019 5	Atlético Mineiro	2–1	Flamengo	Belo Horizonte
19:00 UTC−3	Cazares 28'; Elias (red card) 45+5'; Chará 47'	Report	Bruno Henrique 31'	Stadium: Independência; Attendance: 13,616; Referee: Paulo Roberto Alves Júnior

26 May 2019 6	Flamengo	3–2	Athletico Paranaense	Rio de Janeiro
16:00 UTC−3	Gabriel 32' (pen.); Bruno Henrique 90'; Rodrigo Caio 90+6'	Report	Marcelo Cirino 64', 72' (pen.)	Stadium: Maracanã; Attendance: 52,667; Referee: Daniel Nobre Bins

1 June 2019 7	Flamengo	2–0	Fortaleza	Rio de Janeiro
16:00 UTC−3	Gabriel 40', 68'	Report		Stadium: Nilton Santos; Attendance: 37,658; Referee: Rodrigo D'alonso Ferreira

9 June 2019 8	Fluminense	0–0	Flamengo	Rio de Janeiro
19:00 UTC−3		Report		Stadium: Maracanã; Attendance: 42,726; Referee: Wagner do Nascimento Magalhães

12 June 2019 9	CSA	0–2	Flamengo	Brasília
21:30 UTC−3		Report	Vitinho 65'; Gabriel 77'	Stadium: Mané Garrincha; Attendance: 37,673; Referee: Douglas Marques das Flores

14 July 2019 10	Flamengo	6–1	Goiás	Rio de Janeiro
11:00 UTC−3	de Arrascaeta 6', 45+1', 45+5'; Bruno Henrique 44'; Gabriel 56', 81'	Report	Kayke 12'	Stadium: Maracanã; Attendance: 65,154; Referee: Caio Max Augusto Vieira

21 July 2019 11	Corinthians	1–1	Flamengo	São Paulo
16:00 UTC−3	Clayson 62' (pen.)	Report	Gabriel 86'; Berrío (red card) 90+3'	Stadium: Arena Corinthians; Attendance: 34,737; Referee: Leandro Pedro Vuaden

28 July 2019 12	Flamengo	3–2	Botafogo	Rio de Janeiro
16:00 UTC−3	Gerson 35'; Gabriel 54'; Bruno Henrique 74'	Report	Cícero 14'; Souza 67'	Stadium: Maracanã; Attendance: 45,622; Referee: Raphael Claus

4 August 2019 13	Bahia	3–0	Flamengo	Salvador
16:00 UTC−3	Gilberto 20', 31', 45+6'; Fernandão (red card) 90'	Report		Stadium: Fonte Nova; Attendance: 43,642; Referee: Flávio Rodrigues de Souza

10 August 2019 14	Flamengo	3–1	Grêmio	Rio de Janeiro
19:00 UTC−3	Arão 27'; de Arrascaeta 49'; Ribeiro 90+2'	Report	Galhardo 45+6' (pen.)	Stadium: Maracanã; Attendance: 57,644; Referee: Braulio da Silva Machado

17 August 2019 15	Vasco da Gama	1–4	Flamengo	Brasília
19:00 UTC−3	Castán 58'	Report	Bruno Henrique 42'; Gabriel 51', 62'; de Arrascaeta 83' (pen.)	Stadium: Mané Garrincha; Attendance: 65,418; Referee: Leandro Pedro Vuaden

25 August 2019 16	Ceará	0–3	Flamengo	Fortaleza
19:00 UTC−3		Report	Marí 22'; Gabriel 35'; de Arrascaeta 90+7'	Stadium: Castelão; Attendance: 49,986; Referee: Wilton Sampaio

1 September 2019 17	Flamengo	3–0	Palmeiras	Rio de Janeiro
16:00 UTC−3	Gabriel 11', 61' (pen.); de Arrascaeta 38'	Report	Gómez (red card) 83'	Stadium: Maracanã; Attendance: 65,969; Referee: Rafael Traci

7 September 2019 18	Avaí	0–3	Flamengo	Brasília
17:00 UTC−3	Ferrareis (red card) 90+1'	Report	Gabriel 11'; Marí 32'; Reinier 53'	Stadium: Mané Garrincha; Attendance: 47,575; Referee: Edina Alves Batista

14 September 2019 19	Flamengo	1–0	Santos	Rio de Janeiro
11:00 UTC−3	Gabriel 43'	Report		Stadium: Maracanã; Attendance: 68,243; Referee: Braulio da Silva Machado

21 September 2019 20	Cruzeiro	1–2	Flamengo	Belo Horizonte
19:00 UTC−3	Neves 38' (pen.)	Report	Gabriel 7'; de Arrascaeta 67'	Stadium: Mineirão; Attendance: 40,333; Referee: Raphael Claus

25 September 2019 21	Flamengo	3–1	Internacional	Rio de Janeiro
21:30 UTC−3	Gabriel 20' (pen.); de Arrascaeta 56'; Bruno Henrique 74'	Report	Bruno (red card) 18'; Guerrero (red card) 44'; Edenílson 49'	Stadium: Maracanã; Attendance: 64,548; Referee: Luiz Flavio de Oliveira

28 September 2019 22	Flamengo	0–0	São Paulo	Rio de Janeiro
19:00 UTC−3		Report		Stadium: Maracanã; Attendance: 67,051; Referee: Rafael Traci

6 October 2019 23	Chapecoense	0–1	Flamengo	Chapecó
11:00 UTC−3		Report	Bruno Henrique 35'	Stadium: Arena Condá; Attendance: 12,152; Referee: Vinicius Gonçalves Dias Araujo

10 October 2019 24	Flamengo	3–1	Atlético Mineiro	Rio de Janeiro
20:00 UTC−3	Arão 37'; Vitinho 61'; Reinier 76'	Report	Nathan 51'	Stadium: Maracanã; Attendance: 63,385; Referee: Wilton Sampaio

13 October 2019 25	Athletico Paranaense	0–2	Flamengo	Curitiba
16:00 UTC−3		Report	Bruno Henrique 45', 90+1'	Stadium: Arena da Baixada; Attendance: 25,473; Referee: Bráulio da Silva Machado

16 October 2019 26	Fortaleza	1–2	Flamengo	Fortaleza
20:00 UTC−3	Melo 61' (pen.)	Report	Gabriel 83' (pen.); Reinier 90'	Stadium: Castelão; Attendance: 50,101; Referee: Paulo Roberto Alves Junior

20 October 2019 27	Flamengo	2–0	Fluminense	Rio de Janeiro
18:00 UTC−3	Bruno Henrique 4'; Gerson 66'	Report		Stadium: Maracanã; Attendance: 52,279; Referee: Anderson Daronco

27 October 2019 28	Flamengo	1–0	CSA	Rio de Janeiro
19:00 UTC−3	de Arrascaeta 9'	Report		Stadium: Maracanã; Attendance: 69,846; Referee: Rodolpho Toski Marques

31 October 2019 29	Goiás	2–2	Flamengo	Goiânia
20:00 UTC−3	Moura 77'; Michael 90+4'	Report	Gabriel 55'; Rodrigo Caio 63'; César (red card) 89'	Stadium: Serra Dourada; Attendance: 38,345; Referee: Ricardo Marques Ribeiro

3 November 2019 30	Flamengo	4–1	Corinthians	Rio de Janeiro
16:00 UTC−3	Bruno Henrique 45+1', 45+2', 46'; Vitinho 67'	Report	Vital 52'	Stadium: Maracanã; Attendance: 64,985; Referee: Jean Pierre Goncalves Lima

7 November 2019 31	Botafogo	0–1	Flamengo	Rio de Janeiro
20:00 UTC−3	Luiz Fernando (red card) 55'	Report	Lincoln 89'	Stadium: Nilton Santos; Attendance: 23,092; Referee: Leandro Pedro Vuaden

10 November 2019 32	Flamengo	3–1	Bahia	Rio de Janeiro
18:00 UTC−3	Reinier 54'; Bruno Henrique 72'; Gabriel 87'	Report	Arão 39' (o.g.)	Stadium: Maracanã; Attendance: 65,930; Referee: Caio Max Augusto Vieira

13 November 2019 33	Flamengo	4–4	Vasco da Gama	Rio de Janeiro
21:30 UTC−3	Ribeiro 1'; Barcelos 39' (o.g.); Bruno Henrique 65', 80'	Report	Marrony 34'; Yago Pikachu 38' (pen.); Marcos Júnior 52'; Ribamar 90+3'	Stadium: Maracanã; Attendance: 52,757; Referee: Wilton Pereira Sampaio

17 November 2019 34	Grêmio	0–1	Flamengo	Porto Alegre
16:00 UTC−3		Report	Gabriel 37' (pen.); Gabriel (red card) 74'	Stadium: Arena do Grêmio; Attendance: 30,980; Referee: Raphael Claus

27 November 2019 35	Flamengo	4–1	Ceará	Rio de Janeiro
21:30 UTC−3	Bruno Henrique 65', 74', 85'; Vitinho 90+1'	Report	Galhardo 27'; Xavier (red card) 84'	Stadium: Maracanã; Attendance: 67,539; Referee: Paulo Roberto Alves Junior

1 December 2019 36	Palmeiras	1–3	Flamengo	São Paulo
16:00 UTC−3	Fernandes 84'	Report	de Arrascaeta 4'; Gabriel 45+1', 46'	Stadium: Allianz Parque; Attendance: 22,219; Referee: Ricardo Marques Ribeiro

5 December 2019 37	Flamengo	6–1	Avaí	Rio de Janeiro
20:00 UTC−3	de Arrascaeta 11'; Diego 37'; Gabriel 39'; Lincoln 57'; Reinier 84', 89'	Report	Lourenço 22'	Stadium: Maracanã; Attendance: 69,090; Referee: Jefferson Ferreira de Moraes

8 December 2019 38	Santos	4–0	Flamengo	Santos
16:00 UTC−3	Marinho 15'; Sánchez 23', 85'; Sasha 63'	Report		Stadium: Vila Belmiro; Attendance: 13,310; Referee: Paulo Roberto Alves Junior

=== Copa do Brasil ===
As Flamengo participated in the 2019 Copa Libertadores, the club entered the Copa do Brasil in the round of 16. The draw for the Round of 16 was held on 2 May.

==== Round of 16 ====
Goals and red cards are shown.

15 May 2019 1st leg	Corinthians	0–1	Flamengo	São Paulo
21:30 UTC−3		Report	Arão 79'	Stadium: Arena Corinthians; Attendance: 30,693; Referee: Anderson Daronco

4 June 2019 2nd leg	Flamengo	1–0 (2–0 agg.)	Corinthians	Rio de Janeiro
21:30 UTC−3	Rodrigo Caio 86'	Report		Stadium: Maracanã; Attendance: 60,171; Referee: Leandro Pedro Vuaden

==== Quarter-final ====
The draw for the quarter-final was held on 10 June. All eight teams were placed in a single pot.

Goals and red cards are shown.

10 July 2019 1st leg	Athletico Paranaense	1–1	Flamengo	Curitiba
21:30 UTC−3	Pereira 50'	Report	Gabriel 65'	Stadium: Arena da Baixada; Attendance: 22,825; Referee: Anderson Daronco

17 July 2019 2nd leg	Flamengo	1–1 (2–2 agg.) (1–3 p)	Athletico Paranaense	Rio de Janeiro
21:30 UTC−3	Gabriel 62'	Report	Rony 77'	Stadium: Maracanã; Attendance: 69,980; Referee: Wilton Sampaio
	Penalties
	Diego (penalty missed); Vitinho (penalty missed); Cuéllar (penalty scored); Ribeiro (penalty missed)		(penalty scored) Jonathan; (penalty scored) González; (penalty missed) Nazário; (penalty scored) Guimarães

=== Club World Cup ===
Flamengo qualified for the 2019 FIFA Club World Cup after defeating River Plate in the Copa Libertadores final on 23 November. As the representative for CONMEBOL, Flamengo qualified directly to the semi-final against the winner of the match between AFC Champions League winners Al-Hilal and CAF Champions League winners Espérance de Tunis.

==== Semi-final ====
Goals and red cards are shown.

17 December 2019 Semi-final	Flamengo (Brazil)	3–1	(Saudi Arabia) Al-Hilal	Doha, Qatar
20:30 UTC+3	de Arrascaeta 49'; Bruno Henrique 78'; Al-Bulaihi 82' (o.g.)	Report	Al-Dawsari 18'; Carrillo (red card) 83'	Stadium: Khalifa International Stadium; Attendance: 21,588; Referee: Ismail Elfath (United States)

==== Final ====
UEFA Champions League winners Liverpool defeated CONCACAF Champions League winners Monterrey to advance to the final and recreate the matchup from the 1981 Intercontinental Cup.

Goals and red cards are shown.

21 December 2019 Final	Liverpool (England)	1–0 (a.e.t.)	(Brazil) Flamengo	Doha, Qatar
20:30 UTC+3	Firmino 99'	Report		Stadium: Khalifa International Stadium; Attendance: 45,416; Referee: Abdulrahman Al-Jassim (Qatar)

== Roster ==
As of 13 December 2019

No.	Pos.	Name	Date of birth (age)	Signed in	Contract end	Signed from	Fee	Notes
Goalkeepers
1	GK	(Brazil) Diego Alves	24 June 1985 (aged 34)	2017	2020	(Spain) Valencia	€300k	
22	GK	(Brazil) Gabriel Batista	3 June 1998 (aged 21)	2017	2022	Youth system		
37	GK	(Brazil) César	27 January 1992 (aged 27)	2013	2022	Youth system		
45	GK	(Brazil) Hugo Souza	31 January 1999 (aged 20)	2018	2023	Youth system		
Defenders
2	RB	(Brazil) Rodinei	29 January 1992 (aged 27)	2016	2022	(Brazil) SEV Hortolândia	€941k	
3	CB	(Brazil) Rodrigo Caio	17 August 1993 (aged 26)	2019	2023	(Brazil) São Paulo	€5m	
4	CB	(Spain) Pablo Marí	31 August 1993 (aged 26)	2019	2022	(England) Manchester City	€1.3m	
6	LB	(Brazil) Renê	14 September 1992 (aged 27)	2017	2020	(Brazil) Sport Recife	€955k	
13	RB	(Brazil) Rafinha	7 September 1985 (aged 34)	2019	2021	(Germany) Bayern Munich	Free	
16	LB	(Brazil) Filipe Luís	9 August 1985 (aged 34)	2019	2021	(Spain) Atlético Madrid	Free	
26	CB	(Brazil) Matheus Thuler	10 March 1999 (aged 20)	2018	2023	Youth system		
32	RB	(Brazil) João Lucas	9 March 1998 (aged 21)	2019	2021	(Brazil) Bangu	Undisclosed	
44	CB	(Brazil) Rhodolfo	11 August 1986 (aged 33)	2017	2019	(Turkey) Beşiktaş	€1.4m	
55	CB	(Brazil) Matheus Dantas	5 September 1998 (aged 21)	2018	2019	Youth system		
58	CB	(Brazil) Rafael Santos	2 February 1998 (aged 21)	2018	2022	Youth system		
Midfielders
5	CM	(Brazil) Willian Arão	3 December 1992 (aged 27)	2016	2019	(Brazil) Botafogo	Free	
7	AM	(Brazil) Éverton Ribeiro	10 April 1989 (aged 30)	2017	2023	(United Arab Emirates) Al-Ahli	€6m	
8	CM	(Brazil) Gerson	20 May 1997 (aged 22)	2019	2023	(Italy) Roma	€11.8m	
10	AM	(Brazil) Diego	28 February 1985 (aged 34)	2016	2020	(Turkey) Fenerbahçe	Free	Captain
14	AM	(Uruguay) Giorgian de Arrascaeta	1 June 1994 (aged 25)	2019	2023	(Brazil) Cruzeiro	€13m	
15	DM	(Brazil) Vinicius Souza	17 June 1999 (aged 20)	2019	2021	Youth system		
17	DM	(Brazil) Hugo Moura	3 January 1998 (aged 21)	2018	2023	Youth system		
19	AM	(Brazil) Reinier	19 January 2002 (aged 17)	2018	2024	Youth system		
25	DM	(Paraguay) Robert Piris Da Motta	26 July 1994 (aged 25)	2018	2022	(Argentina) San Lorenzo	€3m	
40	AM	(Brazil) Pepê	6 January 1998 (aged 21)	2018	2020	Youth system		
Forwards
9	CF	(Brazil) Gabriel Barbosa	30 August 1996 (aged 23)	2019	2019	(Italy) Inter Milan	Free	Loan
11	LW	(Brazil) Vitinho	9 October 1993 (aged 26)	2018	2022	(Russia) CSKA Moscow	€10m	
23	LW	(Brazil) Lucas Silva	30 January 1998 (aged 21)	2018	2020	Youth system		
27	LW	(Brazil) Bruno Henrique	30 December 1990 (aged 28)	2019	2021	(Brazil) Santos	€5.36m	
28	RW	(Colombia) Orlando Berrío	14 February 1991 (aged 28)	2017	2020	(Colombia) Atlético Nacional	€3.25m	
29	CF	(Brazil) Lincoln	16 December 2000 (aged 19)	2017	2023	Youth system		
54	CF	(Brazil) Vitor Gabriel	20 January 2000 (aged 19)	2018	2022	Youth system		

== Transfers and loans ==
=== Transfers in ===
Position	Player	Transferred from	Fee	Date	Source
DF	(Brazil) Rodrigo Caio	(Brazil) São Paulo	R$22.2m / €5m	1 January 2019	
MF	(Uruguay) Giorgian de Arrascaeta	(Brazil) Cruzeiro	R$55.3m / €13m	12 January 2019	
FW	(Brazil) Bruno Henrique	(Brazil) Santos	R$23m / €5.4m	23 January 2019	
DF	(Brazil) João Lucas	(Brazil) Bangu	Undisclosed	9 May 2019	
DF	(Brazil) Rafinha	(Germany) Bayern Munich	Free	1 July 2019	
DF	(Spain) Pablo Marí	(England) Manchester City	R$5.5m / €1.3m	11 July 2019	
MF	(Brazil) Gerson	(Italy) Roma	R$49.7m / €11.8m	12 July 2019	
DF	(Brazil) Filipe Luís	(Spain) Atlético Madrid	Free	23 July 2019	
Total			R$155.7m / €36.5m		

=== Loan in ===
Position	Player	Loaned from	Start	End	Source
FW	(Brazil) Gabriel Barbosa	(Italy) Inter Milan	11 January 2019	31 December 2019	

=== Transfers out ===
Position	Player	Transferred to	Fee	Date	Source
FW	(Colombia) Marlos Moreno	(England) Manchester City	Loan return	1 January 2019	
FW	(Brazil) Geuvânio	(China) Tianjin Tianhai	Loan return	1 January 2019	
DF	(Brazil) Réver	(Brazil) Internacional	Early loan return	1 January 2019	
MF	(Brazil) Jajá	Free agent	End of contract	1 January 2019	
DF	(Brazil) Léo Morais	Free agent	End of contract	1 January 2019	
MF	(Brazil) Matheus Trinidade	Free agent	End of contract	1 January 2019	
MF	(Argentina) Héctor Canteros	Free agent	End of contract	1 January 2019	
FW	(Brazil) Nixon	Free agent	End of contract	1 January 2019	
DF	(Brazil) Rafael Vaz	(Brazil) Goiás	Free	1 January 2019	
MF	(Brazil) Lucas Paquetá	(Italy) A.C. Milan	R$150m / €35m	3 January 2019	
DF	(Brazil) Thiago Ennes	Free agent	End of contract	8 January 2019	
FW	(Brazil) Henrique Dourado	(China) Henan Jianye	R$18m / €4.3m	25 February 2019	
DF	(Brazil) Juan	Retired	End of contract	27 April 2019	
FW	(Colombia) Fernando Uribe	(Brazil) Santos	R$5.5m / €1.25m	29 May 2019	
MF	(Brazil) Jean Lucas	(France) Lyon	R$34.7m / €8m	20 June 2019	
DF	(Brazil) Léo Duarte	(Italy) A.C. Milan	R$42m / €10m	28 July 2019	
DF	(Brazil) Pará	(Brazil) Santos	Free	30 July 2019	
DF	(Peru) Miguel Trauco	(France) Saint-Étienne	R$2.5m / €600k	1 August 2019	
FW	(Brazil) Henrique Lordelo	(Brazil) Goiás	Free	22 August 2019	
MF	(Colombia) Gustavo Cuéllar	(Saudi Arabia) Al-Hilal	R$34m / €7.5m	30 August 2019	
MF	(Brazil) Matheus Sávio	(Japan) Kashiwa Reysol	R$4.6m / €1m	9 December 2019	
Total			R$291.3m / €67.65m		

=== Loan out ===
Position	Player	Loaned to	Start	End	Source
MF	(Brazil) Matheus Sávio	(Brazil) CSA	1 January 2019	30 June 2019	
MF	(Brazil) Rômulo	(Brazil) Grêmio	3 January 2019	31 December 2019	
GK	(Brazil) Thiago	(Brazil) América (MG)	20 May 2019	31 December 2019	
DF	(Brazil) Patrick	(Denmark) FC Midtjylland	31 January 2019	31 July 2020	
MF	(Brazil) Gabriel	(Japan) Kashiwa Reysol	1 February 2019	31 December 2019	
MF	(Brazil) Jean Lucas	(Brazil) Santos	9 February 2019	20 June 2019	
GK	(Brazil) Alex Muralha	(Brazil) Coritiba	2 March 2019	31 December 2019	
FW	(Brazil) Thiago Santos	(Brazil) Chapecoense	8 March 2019	31 December 2019	
MF	(Brazil) Matheus Sávio	(Japan) Kashiwa Reysol	1 July 2019	9 December 2019	
MF	(Brazil) Ronaldo	(Brazil) Bahia	9 July 2019	31 December 2020	
FW	(Brazil) Bill	(Brazil) Ponte Preta	15 July 2019	4 December 2019	
DF	(Brazil) Kléber	(Japan) Tokyo Verdy	15 August 2019	31 December 2020	

== Statistics ==
Last updated: 17 December 2019.

Players in italics have left the club before the end of the season.

=== Appearances ===
No.	Pos.	Name	Série A		Copa do Brasil		Libertadores		Carioca		Club World Cup		Total		
No.	Pos.	Name	Starts	Subs	Starts	Subs	Starts	Subs	Starts	Subs	Starts	Subs	Starts	Subs	Apps
Goalkeepers
1	GK	(Brazil) Diego Alves	32	0	4	0	12	0	12	0	2	0	62	0	62
22	GK	(Brazil) Gabriel Batista	0	1	0	0	0	0	1	0	0	0	1	1	2
37	GK	(Brazil) César	6	0	0	0	1	1	4	0	0	0	11	1	12
45	GK	(Brazil) Hugo Souza	0	0	0	0	—	—	0	0	0	0	0	0	0
Defenders
2	RB	(Brazil) Rodinei	12	5	1	1	1	1	5	1	0	0	19	8	27
3	CB	(Brazil) Rodrigo Caio	28	1	4	0	12	0	13	0	2	0	59	1	60
4	CB	(Spain) Pablo Marí	22	0	—	—	6	0	—	—	2	0	30	0	30
6	LB	(Brazil) Renê	17	5	3	0	8	2	12	1	0	0	40	8	48
13	RB	(Brazil) Rafinha	17	2	1	0	7	0	—	—	2	0	27	2	29
16	LB	(Brazil) Filipe Luís	15	1	—	—	5	0	—	—	2	0	22	1	23
26	CB	(Brazil) Matheus Thuler	10	3	0	0	1	0	3	0	0	0	14	3	17
32	RB	(Brazil) João Lucas	2	4	0	0	0	0	—	—	0	0	2	4	6
44	CB	(Brazil) Rhodolfo	7	1	0	0	0	0	5	0	0	0	12	1	13
55	CB	(Brazil) Matheus Dantas	1	0	0	0	0	0	1	0	0	0	2	0	2
58	CB	(Brazil) Rafael Santos	0	1	0	0	0	0	0	0	0	0	0	1	1
Midfielders
5	CM	(Brazil) Willian Arão	32	2	3	0	12	0	12	0	2	0	61	2	63
7	AM	(Brazil) Éverton Ribeiro	26	5	3	1	11	1	11	1	2	0	53	8	61
8	CM	(Brazil) Gerson	22	4	—	—	6	1	—	—	2	0	30	5	35
10	AM	(Brazil) Diego	10	6	2	2	5	4	10	2	0	2	27	16	43
14	AM	(Uruguay) Giorgian de Arrascaeta	22	1	3	0	9	2	9	4	2	0	45	7	52
15	DM	(Brazil) Vinicius Souza	0	2	0	0	0	0	0	1	0	0	0	2	3
17	DM	(Brazil) Hugo Moura	1	0	0	0	0	0	4	1	0	0	5	1	6
19	AM	(Brazil) Reinier	7	6	0	0	0	1	0	0	0	0	7	7	14
25	DM	(Paraguay) Robert Piris Da Motta	13	13	1	1	0	5	4	2	0	1	18	22	40
Forwards
9	CF	(Brazil) Gabriel Barbosa	29	0	4	0	12	0	9	3	2	0	56	3	59
11	LW	(Brazil) Vitinho	11	13	1	3	0	8	7	6	0	2	19	32	51
23	LW	(Brazil) Lucas Silva	3	5	0	0	0	2	2	3	0	0	5	10	15
27	LW	(Brazil) Bruno Henrique	28	4	3	0	13	0	7	3	2	0	53	7	60
28	RW	(Colombia) Orlando Berrío	4	12	0	1	0	3	0	2	0	0	4	18	22
29	CF	(Brazil) Lincoln	4	7	1	1	0	1	0	2	0	1	5	12	17
54	CF	(Brazil) Vitor Gabriel	0	1	0	0	0	0	2	4	0	0	2	5	7
Players transferred out during the season
4	DF	(Brazil) Juan	0	1	—	—	—	—	0	1	—	—	0	2	2
8	DM	(Colombia) Gustavo Cuellar	8	1	3	0	9	1	9	1	—	—	29	3	32
16	MF	(Brazil) Ronaldo	2	1	0	1	0	1	6	2	—	—	8	5	13
18	MF	(Brazil) Jean Lucas	—	—	—	—	—	—	2	0	—	—	2	0	2
19	FW	(Brazil) Henrique Dourado	—	—	—	—	—	—	2	1	—	—	2	1	3
20	FW	(Colombia) Fernando Uribe	0	0	0	0	0	2	7	5	—	—	7	7	14
20	LB	(Peru) Miguel Trauco	5	0	0	0	0	2	6	0	—	—	11	2	13
21	RB	(Brazil) Pará	6	0	2	0	6	0	11	0	—	—	25	0	25
31	DF	(Brazil) Kléber	0	0	0	0	0	0	0	2	—	—	0	2	2
40	FW	(Brazil) Thiago Santos	—	—	—	—	—	—	0	2	—	—	0	2	2
43	CB	(Brazil) Léo Duarte	7	0	4	0	7	0	10	0	—	—	28	0	28
59	FW	(Brazil) Bill	0	1	0	0	—	—	0	1	—	—	0	2	2

=== Goalscorers ===
Rank	Pos.	No.	Player	Série A	Copa do Brasil	Libertadores	Carioca	Club World Cup	Total
1	FW	9	(Brazil) Gabriel Barbosa	25	2	9	7	0	43
2	FW	27	(Brazil) Bruno Henrique	21	0	5	8	1	35
3	MF	14	(Uruguay) Giorgian de Arrascaeta	13	0	1	3	1	18
4	FW	11	(Brazil) Vitinho	5	0	1	3	0	9
5	MF	7	(Brazil) Éverton Ribeiro	2	0	3	1	0	6
5	MF	19	(Brazil) Reinier	6	0	0	0	0	6
7	DF	3	(Brazil) Rodrigo Caio	2	1	1	1	0	5
7	MF	5	(Brazil) Willian Arão	2	1	0	2	0	5
7	MF	10	(Brazil) Diego	1	0	1	3	0	5
10	DF	4	(Spain) Pablo Marí	2	—	1	—	0	3
10	FW	29	(Brazil) Lincoln	3	0	0	0	0	3
12	FW	20	(Colombia) Fernando Uribe	0	0	1	1	—	2
12	FW	19	(Brazil) Henrique Dourado	—	—	—	2	—	2
12	MF	8	(Brazil) Gerson	2	—	0	—	0	2
15	FW	28	(Colombia) Orlando Berrío	1	0	0	0	0	1
15	DF	6	(Brazil) Renê	0	0	0	1	0	1
15	DF	44	(Brazil) Rhodolfo	0	0	0	1	0	1
Own Goals				1	0	1	0	1	3
Total				86	4	24	33	3	150

=== Assists ===
Rank	Pos.	No.	Player	Série A	Copa do Brasil	Libertadores	Carioca	Club World Cup	Total
1	MF	14	(Uruguay) Giorgian de Arrascaeta	11	0	3	2	0	16
2	FW	27	(Brazil) Bruno Henrique	4	1	5	4	1	15
3	MF	7	(Brazil) Éverton Ribeiro	5	2	2	3	0	12
4	FW	9	(Brazil) Gabriel Barbosa	9	0	0	2	0	11
5	MF	5	(Brazil) Willian Arão	3	0	2	1	0	6
6	DF	13	(Brazil) Rafinha	4	0	0	—	1	5
7	FW	11	(Brazil) Vitinho	3	0	0	1	0	4
7	MF	10	(Brazil) Diego	0	0	1	3	0	4
7	DF	21	(Brazil) Pará	0	0	2	2	—	4
10	DF	6	(Brazil) Renê	1	0	0	2	0	3
10	FW	28	(Colombia) Orlando Berrío	2	0	0	1	0	3
10	DF	20	(Peru) Miguel Trauco	1	0	0	2	—	3
13	MF	8	(Brazil) Gerson	1	—	1	—	0	2
13	FW	29	(Brazil) Lincoln	2	0	0	0	0	2
15	DF	2	(Brazil) Rodinei	1	0	0	0	0	1
15	MF	16	(Brazil) Ronaldo	1	0	0	0	—	1
15	MF	17	(Brazil) Hugo Moura	1	0	0	0	0	1
15	FW	54	(Brazil) Vitor Gabriel	1	0	0	0	0	1
15	FW	59	(Brazil) Bill	0	0	—	1	—	1
Total				48	3	16	24	2	93

=== Clean sheets ===
Rank	Player	Série A	Copa do Brasil	Libertadores	Carioca	Club World Cup	Total
1	(Brazil) Diego Alves	13 / 32	2 / 4	4 / 12	4 / 12	0 / 2	23 / 62
2	(Brazil) César	1 / 6	—	1 / 1	0 / 4	—	2 / 11
3	(Brazil) Gabriel Batista	—	—	—	1 / 1	—	1 / 1
Total		14 / 38	2 / 4	5 / 13	5 / 17	0 / 2	26 / 74

=== Hat-tricks ===
Player	Against	Result	Date	Competition	Round	Ref
(Uruguay) Giorgian de Arrascaeta	(Brazil) Goiás	6–1 (H)	14 July 2019	Série A	10	
(Brazil) Bruno Henrique	(Brazil) Corinthians	4–1 (H)	3 November 2019	Série A	30	
(Brazil) Bruno Henrique	(Brazil) Ceará	4–1 (H)	27 November 2019	Série A	35	

(H) – Home; (A) – Away; (N) – Neutral

=== Disciplinary record ===
Pos.	No.	Player	Série A		Copa do Brasil		Libertadores		Carioca		Club World Cup		Total	
Pos.	No.	Player	Booked	Sent off (straight red)	Booked	Sent off (straight red)	Booked	Sent off (straight red)	Booked	Sent off (straight red)	Booked	Sent off (straight red)	Booked	Sent off (straight red)
GK	1	(Brazil) Diego Alves					2		1				3	0
DF	2	(Brazil) Rodinei	5		1				1				7	0
DF	3	(Brazil) Rodrigo Caio	4				3						7	0
DF	4	(Spain) Pablo Marí	4		—	—	1		—	—	1		6	0
MF	5	(Brazil) Willian Arão	3				4		3				10	0
DF	6	(Brazil) Renê	2		1				1				4	0
MF	7	(Brazil) Éverton Ribeiro	3		1				4				8	0
MF	8	(Brazil) Gerson	2		—	—	1		—	—			3	0
MF	8	(Colombia) Gustavo Cuellar	2				4		2		—	—	8	0
FW	9	(Brazil) Gabriel Barbosa	13	1	2		1	2	6				21	3
MF	10	(Brazil) Diego	5				2		4		2		12	0
FW	11	(Brazil) Vitinho	3						3		1		7	0
DF	13	(Brazil) Rafinha	8				2		—	—			10	0
MF	14	(Uruguay) Giorgian de Arrascaeta	1										1	0
MF	15	(Brazil) Vinicius Souza					—	—	1				1	0
DF	16	(Brazil) Filipe Luís	2		—	—	1		—	—			3	0
MF	16	(Brazil) Ronaldo	2						2		—	—	4	0
MF	17	(Brazil) Hugo Moura			—	—			1				1	0
MF	18	(Brazil) Jean Lucas	—	—	—	—			1		—	—	1	0
MF	19	(Brazil) Reinier	1										1	0
DF	20	(Peru) Miguel Trauco	2		—	—			2		—	—	4	0
DF	21	(Brazil) Pará	3				2	1	2		—	—	6	1
MF	25	(Paraguay) Robert Piris Da Motta	4						1				5	0
DF	26	(Brazil) Matheus Thuler	2		—	—			2				4	0
FW	27	(Brazil) Bruno Henrique	9				3		7	2	1		20	2
FW	28	(Colombia) Orlando Berrío	3	1	—	—			1				4	1
FW	29	(Brazil) Lincoln	1				—	—					1	0
DF	32	(Brazil) João Lucas	1										1	0
GK	37	(Brazil) César	2	1									2	1
FW	40	(Brazil) Thiago Santos	—	—	—	—	—	—	1		—	—	1	0
DF	43	(Brazil) Léo Duarte	2		1		2				—	—	4	0
DF	58	(Brazil) Rafael Santos	1		—	—	—	—	—	—			1	0
Total			90	3	6	0	28	3	46	2	5	0	171	8

=== Season records ===
==== Individual ====
- Most matches played in the season in all competitions: 63 – Willian Arão
- Most League matches played in the season: 34 – Willian Arão
- Most matches played as starter in the season in all competitions: 62 – Diego Alves
- Most League matches played as starter in the season: 32 – Diego Alves, Willian Arão
- Most matches played as substitute in the season in all competitions: 32 – Vitinho
- Most League matches played as substitute in the season: 13 – Vitinho, Robert Piris Da Motta
- Most goals in the season in all competitions: 43 – Gabriel Barbosa
- Most League goals in the season: 25 – Gabriel Barbosa
- Most clean sheets in the season in all competitions: 23 – Diego Alves
- Most League clean sheets in the season: 13 – Diego Alves
- Most goals scored in a match: 3
  - Giorgian de Arrascaeta vs Goiás, Série A, 14 July 2019
  - Bruno Henrique vs Corinthians, Série A, 3 November 2019
  - Bruno Henrique vs Ceará, Série A, 27 November 2019
- Goals in consecutive matches in all competitions: 7 consecutive match(es)
  - Gabriel Barbosa, 25 August 2019 to 25 September 2019
- Goals in consecutive League matches: 7 consecutive match(es)
  - Gabriel Barbosa, 17 August 2019 to 25 September 2019
- Fastest goal: 37 seconds
  - Éverton Ribeiro vs Vasco da Gama, Série A, 13 November 2019
- Hat-tricks:
  - Giorgian de Arrascaeta vs Goiás, Série A, 14 July 2019
  - Bruno Henrique vs Corinthians, Série A, 3 November 2019
  - Bruno Henrique vs Ceará, Série A, 27 November 2019

==== Team ====
- Biggest home win in all competitions:
  - 6–1 vs San José, Copa Libertadores, 11 April 2019
  - 6–1 vs Goiás, Série A, 14 July 2019
  - 5–0 vs Grêmio, Copa Libertadores, 23 October 2019
  - 6–1 vs Avaí, Série A, 5 December 2019
- Biggest League home win:
  - 6–1 vs Goiás, Série A, 14 July 2019
  - 6–1 vs Avaí, Série A, 5 December 2019
- Biggest away win in all competitions:
  - 4–1 vs Vasco da Gama, Série A, 17 August 2019
  - 3–0 vs Ceará, Série A, 25 August 2019
  - 3–0 vs Avaí, Série A, 7 September 2019
- Biggest League away win:
  - 4–1 vs Vasco da Gama, Série A, 17 August 2019
  - 3–0 vs Ceará, Série A, 25 August 2019
  - 3–0 vs Avaí, Série A, 7 September 2019
- Biggest home loss in all competitions:
  - 0–1 vs Fluminense, Campeonato Carioca, 14 February 2019
  - 0–1 vs Peñarol, Copa Libertadores, 3 April 2019
- Biggest League home loss:
  - None
- Biggest away loss in all competitions:
  - 0–4 vs Santos, Série A, 9 December 2019
- Biggest League away loss:
  - 0–4 vs Santos, Série A, 9 December 2019
- Highest scoring match in all competitions:
  - 4–4 vs Vasco da Gama, Série A, 13 November 2019
- Highest scoring League match:
  - 4–4 vs Vasco da Gama, Série A, 13 November 2019
- Longest winning run in all competitions: 7 consecutive match(es)
  - 6 October 2019 to 27 October 2019
- Longest League winning run: 8 consecutive match(es)
  - 10 August 2019 to 25 September 2019
- Longest unbeaten run in all competitions: 29 consecutive match(es)
  - 10 August 2019 to 5 December 2019
- Longest League unbeaten run: 23 consecutive match(es)
  - 10 August 2019 to 5 December 2019
- Longest losing run in all competitions: 1 consecutive match(es)
  - 14 February 2019
  - 3 April 2019
  - 24 April 2019
  - 1 May 2019
  - 18 May 2019
  - 24 July 2019
  - 4 August 2019
  - 8 December 2019
  - 21 December 2019
- Longest League losing run: 1 consecutive match(es)
  - 1 May 2019
  - 18 May 2019
  - 4 August 2019
  - 8 December 2019
- Longest without win run in all competitions: 3 consecutive match(es)
  - 31 March 2019 to 6 April 2019
- Longest without League win run: 2 consecutive match(es)
  - 1 May 2019 to 5 May 2019
- Longest scoring run in all competitions: 17 consecutive match(es)
  - 6 October 2019 to 5 December 2019
- Longest League scoring run: 15 consecutive match(es)
  - 10 August 2019 to 5 December 2019
- Longest without scoring run in all competitions: 1 consecutive match(es)
  - 14 February 2019
  - 16 March 2019
  - 3 April 2019
  - 5 May 2019
  - 9 June 2019
  - 24 July 2019
  - 4 August 2019
  - 28 September 2019
  - 8 December 2019
  - 21 December 2019
- Longest League without scoring run: 1 consecutive match(es)
  - 9 June 2019
  - 4 August 2019
  - 28 September 2019
  - 8 December 2019
- Longest conceding goals run in all competitions: 6 consecutive match(es)
  - 10 July 2019 to 28 July 2019
- Longest League conceding goals run: 6 consecutive match(es)
  - 27 April 2019 to 26 May 2019
  - 14 July 2019 to 14 August 2019
- Longest without conceding goals run in all competitions: 4 consecutive match(es)
  - 1 June 2019 to 12 June 2019
- Longest League without conceding goals run: 4 consecutive match(es)
  - 25 August 2019 to 14 September 2019

== Individual awards ==
Name	Position	Nat.	Award
Jorge Jesus	HC	(Portugal)	Campeonato Brasileiro Série A Best Manager Bola de Prata Best Manager
Gabriel Barbosa	FW	(Brazil)	South American Footballer of the Year (El País) Bola de Ouro Bola de Prata Campeonato Brasileiro Série A Team of the Year Série A Top Goal Scorer Copa Libertadores Top Goal Scorer Campeonato Carioca Team of the Year
Bruno Henrique	FW	(Brazil)	South American Footballer of the Year Silver Ball (El País) Copa Libertadores Best Player Campeonato Brasileiro Série A Best Player Campeonato Brasileiro Série A Team of the Year Bola de Prata FIFA Club World Cup Silver Ball; Copa Libertadores Top Assists; Campeonato Carioca Top Goal Scorer; Campeonato Carioca Team of the Year
Giorgian de Arrascaeta	MF	(Uruguay)	South American Footballer of the Year Bronze Ball (El País) Campeonato Brasileiro Série A Team of the Year Bola de Prata Most Beautiful Goal (Bola de Prata) (Note: Round 16, Ceará 0 – 3 Flamengo) Most Beautiful Goal (Craque do Brasileirão)
Éverton Ribeiro	MF	(Brazil)	Campeonato Brasileiro Série A Team of the Year Campeonato Brasileiro Série A Fan-Voted Best Player Campeonato Carioca Best Player Campeonato Carioca Team of the Year
Gerson	MF	(Brazil)	Campeonato Brasileiro Série A Team of the Year Bola de Prata
Rafinha	DF	(Brazil)	Campeonato Brasileiro Série A Team of the Year Bola de Prata
Rodrigo Caio	DF	(Brazil)	Campeonato Brasileiro Série A Team of the Year Campeonato Carioca Team of the Year
Willian Arão	MF	(Brazil)	Bola de Prata
Diego Alves	GK	(Brazil)	Bola de Prata
Pablo Marí	DF	(Spain)	Campeonato Brasileiro Série A Team of the Year
Filipe Luís	DF	(Brazil)	Campeonato Brasileiro Série A Team of the Year
Renê	DF	(Brazil)	Campeonato Carioca Team of the Year
Gustavo Cuéllar	MF	(Colombia)	Campeonato Carioca Team of the Year

== Attendance ==
Includes all competition home matches in the 2019 season. Attendances recorded represent actual gate attendance, not paid attendance.

Source: Globo

Competition	Stadium	Matches	Average	Highest attendance	Lowest attendance	Total
Campeonato Brasileiro	Estádio do Maracanã	18	60,486	69,846	35,016	1,088,748
Campeonato Brasileiro	Estádio Nilton Santos	1	37,658	37,658	37,658	37,658
Campeonato Brasileiro	Total	19	59,284	69,846	35,016	1,126,406
Copa do Brasil	Estádio do Maracanã	2	65,075	69,980	60,171	130,151
Copa Libertadores	Estádio do Maracanã	6	66,330	69,981	62,440	397,981
Campeonato Carioca	Estádio do Maracanã	9	42,708	54,544	26,405	384,380
Total		36	56,636	69,981	26,405	2,038,918
