= CR Flamengo training ground fire =

2019 fire in Rio de Janeiro, Brazil

Flamengo training ground fire
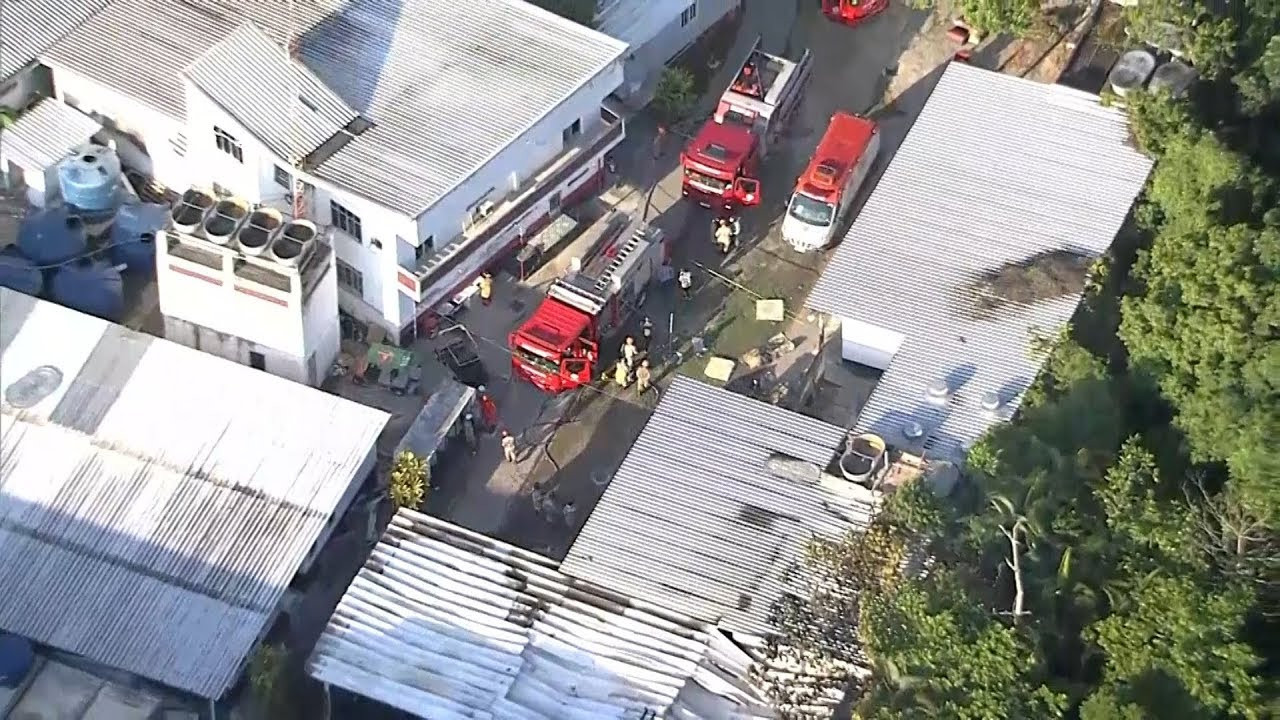
- Date: February 8, 2019
- Time: 5:00 a.m. UTC−03:00
- Location: Vargem Grande, Rio de Janeiro, Brazil; 22°59′01.0″S 43°30′16.2″W
- Cause: Suspected ignition of air conditioning unit
- Deaths: 10
- Injuries: 3

The Flamengo training ground fire was a fatal fire incident that occurred at the training grounds of the Brazilian football team Flamengo in the early morning of February 8, 2019, killing ten youth players and leaving three injured. The event is also known as Ninho do Urubu fire, as it occurred at the George Helal Training Center, also known as Ninho do Urubu ("Vulture's Nest", in Portuguese), located in the neighborhood of Vargem Grande, in the West Zone of the city of Rio de Janeiro, Brazil.

== Background ==
The club had been sued in 2015, under the Brazilian federal Pelé law which allows clubs to enter into special training contracts with players starting at age 14 in exchange for guaranteeing soccer instruction and safe living conditions. The lawsuit in 2015 claimed that the club had poor conditions at the training center, including precarious physical structures, lack of proper enrollment in school and inadequate monitors. A judge ruled in that case that children and adolescents were prohibited from entering the training center until new inspections had been passed at the risk of a $2 million fine.

In 2019, the club had spent 23 million reais (approx 4.5 million GBP/5.84 million USD) to expand the facilities, with the expansion including accommodation for younger players, several pitches, an aquatic park, gym, medical center and mini stadium. In the days prior to the fire, the area had seen severe storms and heavy rain, and the center may have been without electricity or water the night of the fire.

== Fire ==
On the morning of 8 February, a fire erupted at the Ninho do Urubu youth training ground of Flamengo. The location of the fire was the temporary living quarters in a newly expanded section of the campus. The location had only been permitted by the Rio de Janeiro government to be a parking lot and the dorms had already been subjected to 31 fines and a lawsuit owing to the lack of safety.

All of the victims had been sleeping in shipping containers that had been pushed together, with barred windows and only one exit for 26 players. Only twenty-four had been sleeping in the dorms the night of the fire as some had gone home, since practice the next day had been canceled and they lived nearby.

The initial cause of the fire was suspected to be a malfunctioning air-conditioning unit that caught fire in the room of one of the victims close to 5:00. This theory was brought about as one of the survivors claimed that after he fled the dorm he saw his air-conditioning on fire. It is believed that the polyurethane foam insulation caused many of the victims to become disoriented due to the hydrogen cyanide that was emitted as it burned. A firefighter, speaking to reporters, mentioned that first responders were only able to save victims that had managed to get outside and that they had "found only bodies inside" as the "place was completely overtaken by the fire."

== Victims ==
The fire resulted in the deaths of 10 academy players between the ages of 14 and 17, who were training with the club. Three others were injured.

The victims of the fire were Athila de Souza Paixão (14), Arthur Vinícius de Barros da Silva Freitas (14), Bernardo Pisetta (14), Christian Esmério Candido (15), Jorge Eduardo dos Santos Ferreira Sacramento (15), Pablo Henrique da Silva Matos (14), Vitor Isaías (15), Samuel Thomas de Souza Rosa (15), Gerdson Santos (14), and Rykelmo de Souza Viana (17). Cauan Emanuel Gomes Nunes (14 years old), Francisco Dyogo Bento Alves (15), and Jhonatha Cruz Ventura (15) were hospitalized with injuries; Jhonatha's condition was the most severe.

== Investigation ==
According to the Rio de Janeiro city government, the buildings that the fire occurred in did not have the required permits, and the location was on file as a parking lot. The state Labor Ministry launched a task force to determine if any preventative actions could have been taken, and to ensure that the families of the victims would be accommodated.

As of March 2021, Flamengo have paid compensations to 9 of 10 fatal victims. State prosecutors suggested an out of court settlement of 2 million reais to each family, plus 10,000 reais per month until the victims would turn 45-years-old. However, the club president Rodolfo Landim offered 400,000 reais up front and the country's 998 a month salary for ten years, an offer which was immediately rejected.

== Aftermath ==
Club president Rodolfo Landim described it as "the worst tragedy the club has ever experienced in its 123 years." The governor of the state of Rio de Janeiro declared a three-day period of mourning following the tragedy. Brazilian players and those who had previously trained at Flamengo used Twitter to issue statements about the tragedy and offer condolences.

The Campeonato Carioca (Rio de Janeiro state football league) matches scheduled for the following days, including Flamengo's match against rival Fluminense, were postponed. In March, the training ground was reopened.

In 2020, on the first anniversary of the tragedy, relatives were intended to visit the training ground to light candles and offer prayers to the deceased. However, they were barred from the property, and knelt at the side of the road to pray, which was met with widespread criticism across the country.

In 2021, 11 people were charged over the fire, but were gradually acquitted by 2025.

== See also ==
- List of accidents involving sports teams
