= 2021 Vissel Kobe season =

Vissel Kobe
2021 season
- Chairman: Katsuhiro Shimizu
- Manager: Atsuhiro Miura
- Ground: Noevir Stadium Kobe; Kobe, Japan (Capacity: 30,134)
- J1 League: 3rd
- Emperor's Cup: Fourth round
- J.League Cup: Play-off stage
- Top goalscorer: League: Kyogo Furuhashi (15 goals); All: Kyogo Furuhashi (16 goals)
Home colours	Away colours	Third colours

The 2021 Vissel Kobe season was Vissel Kobe's eighth consecutive season in the J1 League following promotion to the top flight in 2013 and their 23rd J1 League season overall. In addition to the league, the club also competed in the Emperor's Cup and the J. League Cup.

== Players ==
=== First-team squad ===
As of 23 January 2021

Note: Flags indicate national team as defined under FIFA eligibility rules; some limited exceptions apply. Players may hold more than one non-FIFA nationality.

No.	Pos.	Nation	Player
1	GK	JPN	Daiya Maekawa
3	DF	JPN	Hirofumi Watanabe
4	DF	BEL	Thomas Vermaelen
5	MF	JPN	Hotaru Yamaguchi (vice-captain)
6	MF	ESP	Sergi Samper
8	MF	ESP	Andrés Iniesta (captain)
9	FW	JPN	Noriaki Fujimoto
10	FW	BRA	Lincoln
13	FW	JPN	Keijiro Ogawa
14	MF	JPN	Takuya Yasui
17	DF	JPN	Ryuho Kikuchi
18	GK	JPN	Hiroki Iikura
19	DF	JPN	Ryo Hatsuse

No.	Pos.	Nation	Player
21	FW	JPN	Junya Tanaka
22	DF	JPN	Daigo Nishi (vice-captain)
23	DF	JPN	Tetsushi Yamakawa
24	DF	JPN	Gōtoku Sakai
25	DF	JPN	Leo Osaki
27	MF	JPN	Yuta Goke
28	GK	JPN	Kenshin Yoshimaru
30	GK	JPN	Genta Ito
31	MF	JPN	Yuya Nakasaka
33	DF	BRA	Dankler
38	MF	JPN	Daiju Sasaki
41	FW	JPN	Yutaro Oda
44	DF	JPN	So Fujitani
49	FW	BRA	Douglas

=== Out on loan ===
Note: Flags indicate national team as defined under FIFA eligibility rules; some limited exceptions apply. Players may hold more than one non-FIFA nationality.

No.	Pos.	Nation	Player
—	DF	JPN	Yuki Kobayashi (at Yokohama FC)
—	FW	JPN	Asahi Masuyama (at Avispa Fukuoka)

== Competitions ==
=== J. League ===
==== Table ====
Pos	Team	Pld	W	D	L	GF	GA	GD	Pts	Qualification or relegation
1	Kawasaki Frontale (C)	38	28	8	2	81	28	+53	92	Qualification for the AFC Champions League group stage
2	Yokohama F. Marinos	38	24	7	7	82	35	+47	79	Qualification for the AFC Champions League group stage
3	Vissel Kobe	38	21	10	7	62	36	+26	73	Qualification for the AFC Champions League play-off round
4	Kashima Antlers	38	21	6	11	62	36	+26	69	
5	Nagoya Grampus	38	19	9	10	44	30	+14	66	

Source: J.League Data Site
Rules for classification: 1) Points; 2) Goal difference; 3) Goals scored; 4) Head-to-head points; 5) Head-to-head goal difference; 6) Head-to-head goal scored; 7) Fair-play points.
(C) Champions

==== Results summary ====
Overall								Home						Away					
Pld	W	D	L	GF	GA	GD	Pts	W	D	L	GF	GA	GD	W	D	L	GF	GA	GD
24	12	8	4	37	23	+14	44	6	4	2	19	8	+11	6	4	2	18	15	+3

Last updated: 21 August 2021.
Source: FBref

==== Results by matchday ====
Round	1	2	3	4	5	6	7	8	9	10	11	12	13	14	15	16	17	18	19	20	21	22	23	24	25	26
Ground	H	A	A	H	H	A	A	H	H	A	A	H	A	H	A	A	H	A	H	A	H	A	H	H	A	H
Result	W	D	W	L	D	W	W	W	D	D	D	W	L	D	L	W	D	W	W	W	D	W	L	W		
Position	6	7	4	6	8	7	5	3	3	5	6	5	5	7	8	7	6	5	4	3	3	3	5	4		

Updated to match(es) played on 21 August 2021. Source: JLeague
A = Away; H = Home; W = Win; D = Draw; L = Loss

==== Matches ====
27 February 2021 1	Vissel Kobe	1–0	Gamba Osaka	Kobe
17:00 JST	Samper (yellow card) 23'; Furuhashi 79'	Report		Stadium: Noevir Stadium Kobe; Attendance: 4,636; Referee: Ryuji Sato

6 March 2021 2	Tokushima Vortis	1–1	Vissel Kobe	Naruto
14:00 JST	Kakita 75'	Report	Kikuchi 87'	Stadium: Pocarisweat Stadium; Attendance: 7,454; Referee: Yusuke Araki

10 March 2021 3	FC Tokyo	2–3	Vissel Kobe	Chōfu
18:00 JST	Diego Oliveira 74'; Nagai 77'	Report	Douglas 5', 65'; Goke 85'	Stadium: Ajinomoto Stadium; Attendance: 4,707; Referee: Jumpei Iida

13 March 2021 4	Vissel Kobe	0–1	Nagoya Grampus	Kobe
18:00 JST		Report	Inagaki 19'	Stadium: Noevir Stadium Kobe; Attendance: 8,934; Referee: Koichiro Fukushima

17 March 2021 5	Vissel Kobe	1–1	Kawasaki Frontale	Kobe
19:00 JST	Kikuchi 90+10'	Report	Jesiel (yellow card) 35'; Tanaka (yellow card) 51'; Damião 72'	Stadium: Noevir Stadium Kobe; Attendance: 7,446; Referee: Masaaki Toma

20 March 2021 6	Consadole Sapporo	3–4	Vissel Kobe	Sapporo
13:00 JST (UTC+9)	Anderson Lopes 45' (pen.) 45+8' (pen.) 46'	Report	Sasaki (yellow card) 43'; Yamaguchi 53' 86'; Furuhashi 57' 67' (pen.)	Stadium: Sapporo Dome; Attendance: 9,512; Referee: (Japan) Hiroki Kasahara

3 April 2021 7	Vegalta Sendai	0–2	Vissel Kobe	Sendai
14:00 JST (UTC+9)	Tawiah (yellow card) 82'	Report	Furuhashi 15'; Kikuchi 21'	Stadium: Yurtec Stadium Sendai; Attendance: 4,619; Referee: (Japan) Masuya Ueda

7 April 2021 8	Vissel Kobe	1–0	Oita Trinita	Kobe
19:00 JST (UTC+9)	Furuhashi 11'	Report		Stadium: Noevir Stadium Kobe; Attendance: 5,180; Referee: (Japan) Jumpei Iida

11 April 2021 9	Vissel Kobe	1–1	Shimizu S-Pulse	Kobe
17:00 JST (UTC+9)	Furuhashi 88'	Report	Elsinho 74'	Stadium: Noevir Stadium Kobe; Attendance: 8,350; Referee: (Japan) Yuichi Nishimura

17 April 2021 10	Shonan Bellmare	0–0	Vissel Kobe	Hiratsuka
15:00 JST (UTC+9)	Tani (yellow card) 5'	Report	Kikuchi (yellow card) 10'; Furuhashi (yellow card) 43'; Sergi Samper (yellow card) 74'	Stadium: Lemon Gas Stadium Hiratsuka; Attendance: 4,796; Referee: (Japan) Hiroyoshi Takayama

24 April 2021 11	Kashima Antlers	1–1	Vissel Kobe	Kashima
17:00 JST (UTC+9)	Ueda 64'	Report	Furuhashi 28'	Stadium: Kashima Soccer Stadium; Attendance: 10,223; Referee: (Japan) Koichiro Fukushima

1 May 2021 12	Vissel Kobe	3–0	Sanfrecce Hiroshima	Kobe
15:00 JST (UTC+9)	Furuhashi 11' 25'; Nakasaka 31'; Hatsuse (yellow card) 77'	Report	Araki (yellow card) 90'	Stadium: Noevir Stadium Kobe; Attendance: No Spectators; Referee: (Japan) Takuto Okabe

9 May 2021 13	Yokohama F. Marinos	2–0	Vissel Kobe	Yokohama
13:00 JST (UTC+9)	Vermaelen 41' (o.g.); Amano 80'	Report		Stadium: Nissan Stadium; Attendance: 4,977; Referee: (Japan) Yoshiro Imamura

15 May 2021 14	Vissel Kobe	1–1	Cerezo Osaka	Kobe
16:00 JST (UTC+9)	Vermaelen 90+6'	Report	Sakamoto 75'	Stadium: Noevir Stadium Kobe; Attendance: 4,333; Referee: (Japan) Maasaki Iemoto

22 May 2021 15	Urawa Reds	2–0	Vissel Kobe	Saitama
16:00 JST (UTC+9)	Iikura 47' (o.g.); Junker 85'	Report		Stadium: Saitama Stadium 2002; Attendance: 4,917; Referee: (Japan) Futoshi Nakamura

26 May 2021 16	Kashiwa Reysol	1–2	Vissel Kobe	Kashiwa
19:00 JST (UTC+9)	Shiihashi 62'	Report	Goke 46'; Furuhashi (yellow card) 49'; Kawaguchi 52' (o.g.); Sasaki (yellow card) 74'	Stadium: Sankyo Frontier Kashiwa Stadium; Attendance: 4,353; Referee: (Japan) Yudai Yamamoto

30 May 2021 17	Vissel Kobe	1–1	Sagan Tosu	Kobe
14:00 JST (UTC+9)	Douglas 28'	Report	Sento 1'	Stadium: Noevir Stadium Kobe; Attendance: 4,795; Referee: (Japan) Hiroki Kasahara

19 June 2021 18	Avispa Fukuoka	1–2	Vissel Kobe	Fukuoka
13:00 JST (UTC+9)	Yamagishi 19'; Nara (yellow card) 38'; Douglas Grolli (yellow card) 67'	Report	Furuhashi 2'; Kikuchi (yellow card) 58'; Andrés Iniesta 80' (pen.)	Stadium: Best Denki Stadium; Attendance: 4,707; Referee: (Japan) Yoshiro Imamura

23 June 2021 19	Vissel Kobe	5–0	Yokohama	Kobe
18:00 JST (UTC+9)	Douglas 26'; Furuhashi 31' 34' 62'; Kikuchi 67'	Report		Stadium: Noevir Stadium Kobe; Attendance: 4,252; Referee: (Japan) Hayato Shimizu

3 July 2021 21	Vissel Kobe	3–1	Shonan Bellmare	Kobe
18:00 JST (UTC+9)	Furuhashi 17'; Yamaguchi 45+1'; Nakasaka 63'	Report	Elyounoussi 12'	Stadium: Noevir Stadium Kobe; Attendance: 4,806; Referee: (Japan) Maasaki Iemoto

17 July 2021 20	Cerezo Osaka	1–1	Vissel Kobe	Osaka
19:00 JST (UTC+9)	Toriumi 89'	Report	Furuhashi 30'	Stadium: Yanmar Stadium Nagai; Attendance: 4,539; Referee: (Japan) Yuichi Nishimura

21 July 2021 22	Gamba Osaka	1–2	Vissel Kobe	Suita
19:00 JST (UTC+9)	Patric 19'; Wellington Silva (yellow card) 52'	Report	Douglas 26'; Tanaka 31'	Stadium: Panasonic Stadium Suita; Attendance: 4,998; Referee: (Japan) Jumpei Iida

9 August 2021 23	Vissel Kobe	1–2	Kashiwa Reysol	Kobe
18:00 JST (UTC+9)	Sergi Samper (yellow card) 58'; Oda 70'	Report	Cristiano 65'; Shiihashi (yellow card) 89'; Hosoya 90+5'; Kamijima (yellow card) 90+7'	Stadium: Noevir Stadium Kobe; Attendance: 8,707; Referee: (Japan) Nobutsugu Murakami

14 August 2021 24	Sanfrecce Hiroshima	P–P	Vissel Kobe	Hiroshima
				Stadium: Edion Stadium Hiroshima

21 August 2021 25	Vissel Kobe	1–0	Kashima Antlers	Kobe
18:00 JST (UTC+9)	Yamaguchi 79'	Report	Diego Pituca (yellow card) 43'; Inukai (yellow card) 80'	Stadium: Noevir Stadium Kobe; Attendance: 6,426; Referee: (Japan) Yoshiro Imamura

25 August 2021 26	Oita Trinita	1-3	Vissel Kobe	Ōita
19:00 JST (UTC+9)	Kagawa 2'; Hasegawa (yellow card) 35'		Sakai 9'; Iniesta 45+4'; Kikuci 87'

=== Emperor's Cup ===
16 June 2021 Second round	Vissel Kobe	4–0	Suzuka Point Getters	Noevir Stadium Kobe
18:00 JST	Tanaka 29', 61'; Kobayashi 49'; Yasui 90'	Report		Attendance: 1,938; Referee: Reo Tanaka

7 July 2021 Third round	Vissel Kobe	1–0	Tokushima Vortis	Noevir Stadium Kobe
18:00 JST	Furuhashi 38'	Report		Attendance: 2,836; Referee: Hiroyuki Kimura

18 August 2021 Fourth round	Nagoya Grampus	1–0	Vissel Kobe	Toyota
18:00 JST	Świerczok 89'	Report		Stadium: Toyota Stadium; Attendance: 3,453; Referee: (Japan) Hiroki Kasahara

=== J.League Cup ===
==== Group stage ====
Pos	Team	Pld	W	D	L	GF	GA	GD	Pts	Qualification
1	FC Tokyo	6	3	3	0	6	2	+4	12	Advanced to play-off stage
2	Vissel Kobe	6	2	2	2	6	4	+2	8	Advanced to play-off stage
3	Oita Trinita	6	1	3	2	4	6	−2	6	
4	Tokushima Vortis	6	1	2	3	3	7	−4	5	

Source: J.League
Rules for classification: Tiebreakers

2 March 2021 1	Oita Trinita	1–3	Vissel Kobe	Ōita
19:03 JST	Fujimoto 20'	Report	Masuyama 44'; Nakasaka 51'; Tanaka 81'	Stadium: Showa Denko Dome Oita; Attendance: 3,320; Referee: Hiroki Kasahara

28 March 2021 2	FC Tokyo	2–0	Vissel Kobe	Chōfu
14:03 JST	Diego Oliveira 11'; Mita 14'	Report		Stadium: Ajinomoto Stadium; Attendance: 6,512; Referee: Hajime Matsuo

21 April 2021 3	Vissel Kobe	0–1	Tokushima Vortis	Kobe
19:00 JST		Report	Kawata 30'	Stadium: Noevir Stadium Kobe; Attendance: 2,184; Referee: (Japan) Dai Matsumoto

28 April 2021 4	Vissel Kobe	0–0	Oita Trinita	Kobe
19:00 JST	Masuyama (yellow card) 51' (yellow-red card) 63'	Report		Stadium: Noevir Stadium Kobe; Attendance: No Spectators; Referee: (Japan) Nobutsugu Murakami

5 May 2021 5	Vissel Kobe	0–0	FC Tokyo	Kobe
15:00 JST		Report		Stadium: Noevir Stadium Kobe; Attendance: No Spectators; Referee: (Japan) Hiroki Kasahara

19 May 2021 6	Tokushima Vortis	0–3	Vissel Kobe	Naruto
19:00 JST	Kawata (yellow card) 65'	Report	Yamaguchi 2'; Masika 52' 90+3'	Stadium: Pocarisweat Stadium; Attendance: 3,448; Referee: (Japan) Hajime Matsuo

==== Play-off stage ====
6 June 2021 First leg	Vissel Kobe	1–2	Urawa Reds	Kobe
19:00 JST	Douglas 3'	Report	Ito 45+1'; Koroki 71'	Stadium: Noevir Stadium Kobe; Attendance: 4,720; Referee: (Japan) Yuichi Nishimura

13 June 2021 Second leg	Urawa Reds	2–2 (4–3 agg.)	Vissel Kobe	Saitama
19:00 JST	Koizumi 16'; Junker 45+3'; Abe (yellow card) 86'	Report	Douglas 22'; Andrés Iniesta 77'; Sergi Samper (yellow card) 90+5'	Stadium: Urawa Komaba Stadium; Attendance: 4,892; Referee: (Japan) Akihiko Ikeuchi

== Statistics ==
=== Goal scorers ===
Rank	No.	Pos	Nat	Name	J1 League	Emperor's Cup	J.League Cup	Total
1	11	FW	(Japan)	Kyogo Furuhashi	15	1	0	16
2	49	FW	(Brazil)	Douglas	5	0	2	7
3	5	MF	(Japan)	Hotaru Yamaguchi	3	0	1	4
3	17	DF	(Japan)	Ryuho Kikuchi	4	0	0	4
3	21	MF	(Japan)	Junya Tanaka	1	2	1	4
6	31	MF	(Japan)	Yuya Nakasaka	2	0	1	3
7	8	MF	(Spain)	Andrés Iniesta	1	0	1	2
7	27	MF	(Japan)	Yuta Goke	2	0	0	2
7	40	FW	(Kenya)	Ayub Masika	0	0	2	2
10	3	DF	(Japan)	Yuki Kobayashi	0	1	0	1
10	4	DF	(Belgium)	Thomas Vermaelen	1	0	0	1
10	35	MF	(Japan)	Takuya Yasui	0	1	0	1
10	37	MF	(Japan)	Asahi Masuyama	0	0	1	1
Own goals					1	0	0	1
Totals					35	5	9	49

Last updated: 21 July 2021

=== Clean sheets ===
Rank	No.	Pos	Nat	Name	J1 League	Emperor's Cup	J.League Cup	Total
1	1	GK	(Japan)	Daiya Maekawa	6	1	0	7
2	18	GK	(Japan)	Hiroki Iikura	0	1	3	4
Totals					6	2	3	11

Last updated: 7 July 2021
