= Kennyd =

Brazilian footballer

Personal information
- Full name: Kennyd Lucas Rodrigues de Lima
- Date of birth: 6 March 2004 (age 22)
- Place of birth: Cuiabá, Brazil
- Height: 1.76 m (5 ft 9 in)
- Position: Forward

Team information
- Current team: Porto B (on loan from Goiás)
- Number: 56

Youth career
- Brasilis-SP
- Flamengo
- Corinthians
- Bahia
- 2021–2022: Cuiabá

Senior career*
| Years | Team | Apps | (Gls) |
| 2022–2023 | Cuiabá | 0 | (0) |
| 2023– | Goiás | 0 | (0) |
| 2023– | → Porto B (loan) | 7 | (1) |
- * Club domestic league appearances and goals as of 10 June 2024

Kennyd Lucas Rodrigues de Lima (born 6 March 2004), known as Kennyd, is a Brazilian footballer who plays as a forward for Porto B, on loan from Goiás.

== Club career ==
Born in Cuiabá, Kennyd passed through the academies of Brasilis-SP, Flamengo, Corinthians and Bahia. While at Flamengo, he was one of the survivors of the Flamengo training ground fire in 2019, which took the lives of ten youth players.

In 2021, he signed for Cuiabá, marking his debut with the under-17 squad by scoring four goals in an 8–0 win over Operário-VG. He signed a contract renewal with the club in August 2022.

In March 2023, Kennyd signed for Goiás.

On 10 July 2023, Portuguese side Porto announced the signing of Kennyd on a season-long loan, with a future option to buy. He joined the B team. He made his debut for the side on 13 August, starting in a 1–1 home draw against Tondela in the Liga Portugal 2. Two weeks later, Kennyd scored his first goal for Porto B, in a league match at home against União de Leiria; after coming off the bench to replace Wendel on the 78th minute, he scored on the 88th minute, sealing a 2–1 victory.

== Career statistics ==
=== Club ===
As of match played 16 September 2023

Appearances and goals by club, season and competition
| Club | Season | League | | | State league | | Cup | | Other | | Total | |
| Club | Season | Division | Apps | Goals | Apps | Goals | Apps | Goals | Apps | Goals | Apps | Goals |
|---|---|---|---|---|---|---|---|---|---|---|---|---|
| Cuiabá | 2022 | Série A | 0 | 0 | 0 | 0 | 0 | 0 | 6 (Note: Four appearances in Copa FMF, two appearances and one goal in Copa Verde) | 1 | 6 | 1 |
| Goiás | 2023 | Série A | 0 | 0 | 0 | 0 | 0 | 0 | 0 | 0 | 0 | 0 |
| Porto B (loan) | 2023–24 | Liga Portugal 2 | 5 | 1 | — | | — | | — | | 5 | 1 |
| Career total | | | 5 | 1 | 0 | 0 | 0 | 0 | 6 | 1 | 11 | 2 |
