= Ninho do Urubu =

Association football training ground

Centro de Treinamento George Helal
- Ninho do Urubu ("Vulture's Nest")
- Interactive map of Centro de Treinamento George Helal
- Location: Vargem Grande, Rio de Janeiro, Brazil
- Coordinates: 22°59′02.9″S 43°30′20.7″W
- Owner: Flamengo
- Type: Sports training facility
- Surface: Grass pitches (6); Synthetic turf (1)

Construction
- Groundbreaking: 21 May 2011
- Built: 2011–2012
- Expanded: 2015–2016; 2018–2019
- Cost: R$30 million
- Architect: Wagner Barroso

Tenants
- Flamengo; Flamengo Youth Academy

The Centro de Treinamento George Helal (George Helal Training Center), commonly known as Ninho do Urubu ("The Vulture's Nest," in Portuguese) is the training ground and youth team headquarters of Brazilian football club Flamengo. It is located in the Vargem Grande neighborhood, in the Southwest Zone of Rio de Janeiro, Brazil. The construction on the complex began in 2011 and the club began use of the facilities in mid 2012. Between 2015 and 2016, major additions were implemented at the complex including more football pitches, a medical center, and Center of Excellence in Performance (CEP). The total construction cost of the campus is approximately R$30 million. Construction of the entire complex was completed in 2016.

On the morning of February 8, 2019 a fire broke out in the living quarters of several youth academy players while they were sleeping. Ten players between the ages of 14 and 17 were killed, and three others were hospitalized with burn injuries.

== History ==
The property where the complex is located was acquired on August 30, 1984 by president George Helal, but the start of construction was delayed for many years. At the time, the land was purchased for Cr$300 million (Brazilian cruzeiro). The real estate was later valued at R$350 million, an increase of 6,900 %. On May 21, 2011 under the management of club president Patricia Amorim, the site was authorized for construction. The total land area is 140,000 m².

== Facilities ==
=== Press room ===
On 30 November 2016 after the LaMia Airlines Flight 2933 airplane crash, Flamengo announced that would name the Ninho do Urubu press room after Victorino Chermont. Victorino, one of the victims of the crash, was a journalist of Fox Sports Brazil who had worked for many years covering Flamengo and was a known club supporter.

== 2016 Summer Olympics ==
During Rio 2016 the facilities were used by Brazil U23 and Argentina U23 football teams. The agreement to use the space was signed between Flamengo and the Rio 2016 Organizing Committee.

== February 8, 2019 fire ==
On the morning of February 8, 2019, a fire erupted at the Ninho do Urubu living quarters. The fire resulted in the deaths of ten academy players between the ages of 14 and 17 training with the club. Three others were injured. The cause of the fire was a malfunctioning air-conditioning unit that caught fire in the room of one of the victims close to 5:00. The location of the fire was the temporary living quarters in a newly expanded section of the campus. The state Labor Ministry launched a task force to determine if any preventative actions could have been taken, and to ensure that the families of the victims would be accommodated.

The victims of the fire were Athila de Souza Paixão (14), Arthur Vinícius de Barros da Silva Freitas (14), Bernardo Pisetta (14), Christian Esmério Candido (15), Jorge Eduardo dos Santos Ferreira Sacramento (15), Pablo Henrique da Silva Matos (14), Vitor Isaías (15), Samuel Thomas de Souza Rosa (15), Gerdson Santos (14), and Rykelmo de Souza Viana (17).

Cauan Emanuel Gomes Nunes (14 years old), Francisco Dyogo Bento Alves (15), and Jhonatha Cruz Ventura (15) were hospitalized with injuries; Jhonatha's condition was the most severe.

Club president Rodolfo Landim described it as "the worst tragedy the club has ever experienced in its 123 years." The governor of the state of Rio de Janeiro declared a three-day period of mourning following the tragedy.
