= Lincoln (footballer, born 2000) =

Brazilian footballer

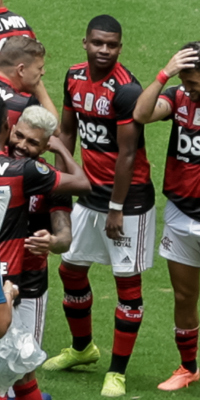
- Lincoln with Flamengo in 2020

Personal information
- Full name: Lincoln Corrêa dos Santos
- Date of birth: 16 December 2000 (age 25)
- Place of birth: Serra, Brazil
- Height: 1.80 m (5 ft 11 in)
- Positions: Forward; winger

Team information
- Current team: Vila Nova

Youth career
- 2015–2017: Flamengo

Senior career*
Years	Team	Apps	(Gls)
2017–2021	Flamengo	46	(5)
2021–2024	Vissel Kobe	26	(1)
2022	→ Cruzeiro (loan)	9	(1)
2024–2025	Rheindorf Altach	2	(0)
2025	→ Athletic (loan)	11	(3)
2025–2026	Spartak Subotica	16	(4)
2026–	Vila Nova	0	(0)

International career^{‡}
2015	Brazil U15		
2016–2017	Brazil U17	18	(9)
2018–2019	Brazil U20	11	(4)
- * Club domestic league appearances and goals as of 13 June 2026 ‡ National team caps and goals as of 16 July 2019

Lincoln Corrêa dos Santos (born 16 December 2000), or simply Lincoln, is a Brazilian professional footballer who plays as a forward for Vila Nova.

== Career ==
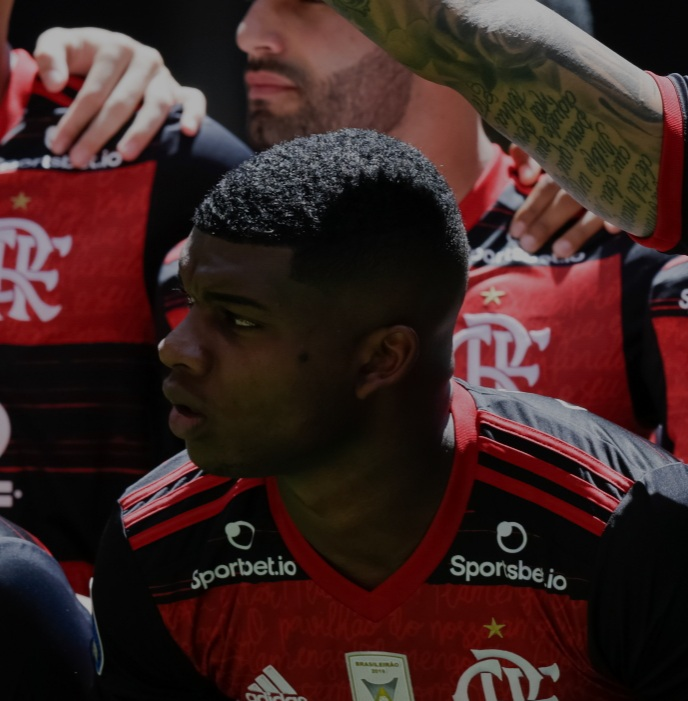
Lincoln with Flamengo in 2020

=== Flamengo ===
Lincoln made his professional debut for Flamengo at only 16 years old in a Brazilian Série A match on 19 November 2017 against Corinthians at Ilha do Urubu. He came to the field as a 65th-minute substitute as Flamengo won 3–0. One week later he played his second professional match, this time against Santos, Flamengo lost 2–1.

After Real Madrid signed Vinícius Júnior, other European clubs such as Barcelona, Atletico Madrid, Manchester United, Juventus, and Real Madrid started to scout Lincoln with attention as another possible future star. Some of the specialized media compared him with Polish striker Robert Lewandowski.

Lincoln scored his first goal at national level in a 2018 Copa do Brasil thrilling 1–1 match against Grêmio at Arena do Grêmio. He came to the pitch at the 77th minute and scored the equalizer at the 94th minute with a pass from Renê.

=== Vissel Kobe ===
On 20 January 2021, Lincoln signed with Japanese side Vissel Kobe. On 8 March 2024 his contract was rescinded by mutual consent.

=== Rheindorf Altach ===
In the summer of 2024, Lincoln signed a contract with Rheindorf Altach in Austria for two seasons, with a club option for a third. On 16 January 2025, Rheindorf Altach loaned him to Athletic until the end of 2025.

== Career statistics ==
As of match played 26 October 2025

Appearances and goals by club, season and competition
Club	Season	League			National cup		League cup		Continental		Other		Total	
Club	Season	Division	Apps	Goals	Apps	Goals	Apps	Goals	Apps	Goals	Apps	Goals	Apps	Goals
Flamengo	2017	Série A	3	0	0	0	—		1 (Note: Appearance(s) in Copa Sudamericana)	0	0	0	4	0
Flamengo	2018	Série A	9	0	3	1	—		4 (Note: Appearance(s) in Copa Libertadores)	0	6 (Note: Appearance(s) in Campeonato Carioca)	1	22	2
Flamengo	2019	Série A	11	3	2	0	—		1	0	3 (Note: Two appearances in Campeonato Carioca, one appearance in FIFA Club World Cup)	0	17	3
Flamengo	2020	Série A	14	1	2	0	—		3	2	1	0	20	3
Flamengo	Total		37	4	7	1	—		9	2	10	1	63	8
Vissel Kobe	2021	J1 League	13	1	0	0	5	0	—		—		18	1
Vissel Kobe	2022	J1 League	8	0	1	0	0	0	4	3	—		13	3
Vissel Kobe	2023	J1 League	5	0	1	2	4	2	—		—		10	4
Vissel Kobe	Total		26	1	2	2	9	2	4	3	—		41	8
Cruzeiro (loan)	2022	Série B	9	1	0	0	—		—		—		9	1
Rheindorf Altach	2024–25	Austrian Bundesliga	2	0	0	0	—		—		—		2	0
Career total			74	6	9	3	9	2	13	5	10	1	115	17

== Honours ==
Flamengo

- Campeonato Brasileiro Série A: 2019
- Campeonato Carioca: 2019, 2020
- Copa Libertadores: 2019
- Supercopa do Brasil: 2020
- Recopa Sudamericana: 2020
- FIFA Club World Cup runner-up: 2019

Vissel Kobe

- J1 League: 2023
