= Ryuho Kikuchi =

Japanese professional footballer

Ryuho Kikuchi 菊池 流帆
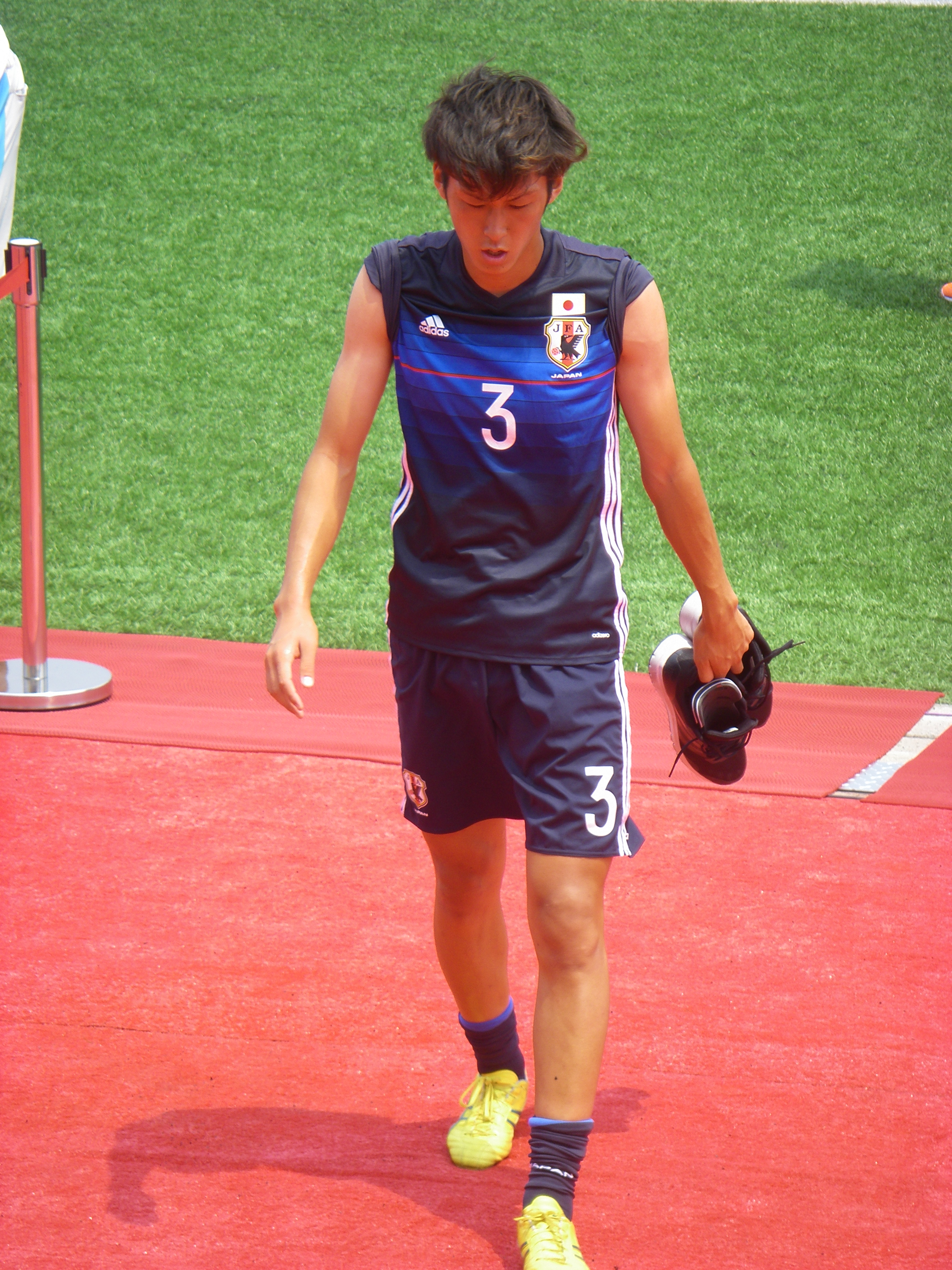
- Ryuho Kikuchi representing Japan U20 in 2017.

Personal information
- Full name: Ryuho Kikuchi
- Date of birth: 9 December 1996 (age 29)
- Place of birth: Kamaishi, Iwate, Japan
- Height: 1.88 m (6 ft 2 in)
- Position: Centre back

Team information
- Current team: Machida Zelvia
- Number: 4

Youth career
- 2009–2011: FC Kanaishi
- 2012–2014: Aomori Yamada High School

College career
Years	Team	Apps	(Gls)
2015–2018	Osaka University H&SS		

Senior career*
Years	Team	Apps	(Gls)
2019	Renofa Yamaguchi	35	(3)
2020–2024	Vissel Kobe	97	(11)
2025–	Machida Zelvia	9	(2)
- * Club domestic league appearances and goals as of 13 September 2025

Ryuho Kikuchi (菊池 流帆, Kikuchi Ryūho; born 9 December 1996) is a Japanese professional footballer who plays as a centre back for Machida Zelvia.

== Early career ==
During his third year at Aomori Yamada High School, Kikuchi contributed to the team's top four position in the Inter-High School Championships and was selected as the tournament's outstanding player. He started out as a midfielder, but was converted to a defender. Kikuchi later went on to join Osaka University H&SS on 19 November 2017. During his time at Osaka University H&SS, he was selected in the 2017 Summer Universiade squad, and was part of the team that defeated France in the final.

== Career ==
On 9 December 2018, Kikuchi joined Renofa Yamaguchi.

On 24 December 2019, Kikuchi was announced at Vissel Kobe. During the 2021 season, he held the record for most duels won, with over 70% of duels won as of 26 May 2021. At the end of the season, Kikuchi was announced as one of the 31 J.League Outstanding Player Award winners. On 19 February 2022, he was not selected in the Kobe squad due to poor health. He was injured on 16 July 2022 against Kashima Antlers, and would spend eight weeks out with an injury to the posterior cruciate ligament in his right knee. Kikuchi was further injured on 4 March 2023 against Gamba Osaka, and suffered an ACL injury that would keep him out for eight months. Vissel Kobe would go on to win the 2023 J1 League. From 2024, he changed his jersey number to 81, to represent his hard work from zero after his injury. Vissel Kobe would go on to win the 2024 J1 League.

On 4 January 2025, Kikuchi was announced at Machida Zelvia.

== Style of play ==
Kikuchi is known for yelling loudly during headers and blocking shots. His passionate yelling during defending was heard more during the 2021 season, where supporters were not allowed to cheer due to the Covid-19 outbreak.

== Personal life ==
Whilst at university, Kikuchi started a blog, which received responses from fellow footballers Shoto Suzuki, Shunya Yoneda and Seiya Nakano. He is known by the nickname David Ryuho, as he respects David Luiz.

== Honours ==
Vissel Kobe

- J1 League: 2023, 2024
- Emperor's Cup: 2024

Machida Zelvia

- Emperor's Cup: 2025
