= Vargem Grande, Rio de Janeiro =

Vargem Grande
- Neighborhood
- Location in Rio de Janeiro Vargem Grande (Brazil)
- Coordinates: 22°58′34″S 43°29′39″W
- Country: Brazil
- State: Rio de Janeiro (RJ)
- Municipality/City: Rio de Janeiro
- Zone: Southwest Zone

Population (2010)
  - Total: 14,039

Vargem Grande (Big Meadow) is a neighborhood in the Southwest Zone of Rio de Janeiro, Brazil.
