= Rodolfo Landim =

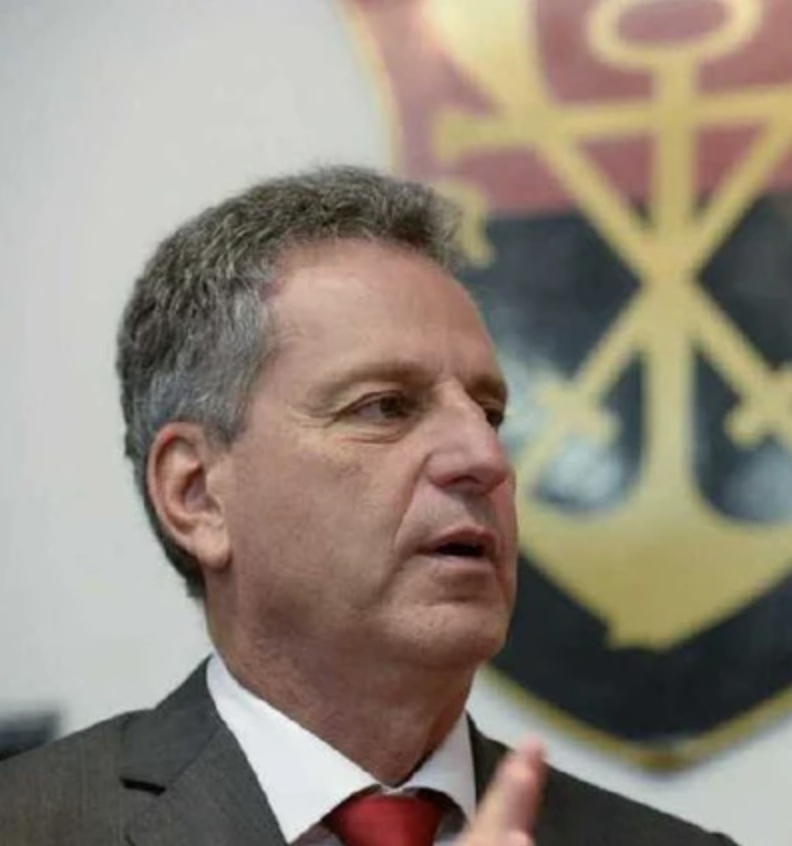
- Born: Luiz Rodolfo Landim Machado; 24 March 1957 (age 69); Rio de Janeiro, Brazil
- Occupations: Businessman, sports director
- Known for: President of Flamengo

Luiz Rodolfo Landim Machado (born 24 March 1957) is a Brazilian sports director and petroleum engineer. He was president of Clube de Regatas do Flamengo, elected for the 2019–2021 term and reelected for the 2022–2024 term

== Industrial career ==
Landim graduated from engineering department of the Federal University of Rio de Janeiro (UFRJ) in 1979. In February 1980 he joined Petrobras. He remained at Petrobras for 26 years where he served, among other positions, as the Production Superintendent of the Northeast Region and General Superintendent of the North Region.

From 2003 to 2006, Landim was president of Petrobras Distribuidora. He was executive president of MMX (mining), OGX (oil and gas) and OSX (shipbuilding), all companies founded by serial entrepreneur Eike Batista, who Landim sued. Landim was also director of Cameron International Corporation. He was a managing partner of Maré Investimentos and president of Ouro Preto Oil and Gas.

== Flamengo ==
=== 2012 election ===
Landim was vice-president of planning during club president Eduardo Bandeira de Melo's first term (2012-2014). Landim would have been vice-president if Wallim Vasconcelos's party had won the 2012 election.

=== 2018 election ===
For the 2018 Flamengo elections, Landim was the main opposition candidate and defeated Rodrigo Lomba, candidate from the incumbent party of Bandeira de Melo. Before officially taking office in January 2019, Landim announced the hiring of new football manager for the 2019 season Abel Braga on Twitter.

=== 2019 tragedy ===
In February 2019, a fire took place in Flamengo's youth apartments. Ten boys, aged 14 to 16, died trying to leave the place where they were sleeping. These young boys were part of Flamengo's youth team and were sleeping in Flamengo's property. After general public commotion, Mr Landim, as president of Flamengo, became famous in Brazil for not providing assistance to the families of these boys. In addition, he conducted an aggressive negotiation tactic to pay as little as possible for these families, denying the amount proposed by federal authorities, beginning an extensive legal battle and, then, settling with the families individually after more than 2 years after the accident occurred. Important to note that these families were all of low income and could not afford the legal battle that Mr Landim decided to do.

=== 2027 FIFA Women's World Cup comments ===
During an interview with the newspaper O Globo published on November 2, 2024, Landim expressed his opposition to the suspension of the Brazilian Football Confederation (CBF) calendar during the 2027 FIFA Women's World Cup, which is one of FIFA's requirements for the chosen host country, blaming the suspensions for Flamengo's performance below expectations in the Brazilian Championship, Copa do Brasil and Copa Libertadores da América. In addition, Landim made sexist statements in the article, claiming that women's football in Brazil does not attract audiences (either in stadiums or on television) and that Maracanã Stadium (the venue for the opening and closing ceremonies of the competition) could not even be used in the tournament, suggesting the use of stadiums in the Bangu region. The speech had a negative impact in the Brazilian media and was repudiated by sports journalists and the national team coach, Arthur Elias.
