= Podolsky =

Podolsky/Podolski (masculine), Podolskaya/Podolska (feminine), or Podolskoye/Podolscy (neuter) may refer to:

== People ==
=== Podolski ===
- Dariusz Podolski, Polish football player
- Lukas Podolski (born 1985), Poland-born German football player
- Łukasz Podolski (born 1980), Polish road cyclist
- Sophie Podolski (1953–1974), Belgian poet and graphic artist
- Waldemar Podolski, Polish football player

=== Podolska ===
- Iryna Podolska, Ukrainian football player

=== Podolsky ===
- Boris Podolsky (1896–1966), American physicist
- Leo Podolsky (1894–1987), Russian pianist

=== Podolskaya ===
- Natalia Podolskaya (born 1982), Belarusian singer

=== Fictional characters ===
- Deputy Commissioner Podolski, character in Brooklyn Nine-Nine
- Trevor Podolski, character in Brooklyn Nine-Nine

== Places ==
- Podolsky District, a district of Moscow Oblast, Russia
- Podolsky (rural locality) (Podolskaya, Podolskoye), several rural localities in Russia

== See also ==
- Podolia
- Podolsk (disambiguation)
- Podolski (surname)
- Podolska Cavalry Brigade
- Kamianets-Podilskyi, a city in Ukraine
- Kamenets-Podolsky pocket, World War II battle
