= Rafikovo =

Rafikovo Рафиково
- Village
- Location within Bashkortostan Location within Russia
- Coordinates: 52°15′N 58°17′E
- Country: Russia
- Region: Bashkortostan
- District: Khaybullinsky District
- Time zone: UTC+5:00

Rafikovo (Russian: Рафиково; Bashkir: Рафиҡ, Rafiq) is a rural locality (a village) in Ufimsky Selsoviet, Khaybullinsky District, Bashkortostan, Russia. The population was 180 as of 2010. There are three streets.

== Geography ==
Rafikovo is located 74 km north of Akyar (the district's administrative centre) by road. Alibayevskoye is the nearest rural locality.
