= Podolski (surname) =

Geographical Name

Podolski (Polish feminine: Podolska, plural: Podolscy), (Ukrainian: Подольский) is a Slavic surname found mostly in Poland and Ukraine. It refers to the historical region of Podolia, located in present-day Ukraine.

== People with the surname Podolski ==
- Dariusz Podolski, Polish football player
- Lukas Podolski (born 1985), Poland-born German football player
- Łukasz Podolski (born 1980), Polish professional road cyclist
- Sophie Podolski (1953–1974), Belgian poet and graphic artist
- Waldemar Podolski, Polish football player

== Related forms ==
- Podolak (Ukrainian: Подоляк)
- Podolec (Ukrainian: Подолець)
- Podolan (Ukrainian: Подолян)
- Podilchak/Podilczak ((Ukrainian: Подільчак)
- Podilchuk/Podilczuk ((Ukrainian: Подольчук)
- Podolchak/Podolczak ((Ukrainian: Подольчак)
- Podolchuk/Podolczuk (Ukrainian: Подольчук)
- Podolczyk ((Ukrainian: Подольчик)
- Podolcsák (Hungarian version of the Polish Podolczak)
- Podilchyk/Podilczyk ((Ukrainian: Подольчик)
