= Ufimsky, Khaybullinsky District, Republic of Bashkortostan =

Ufimsky Уфимский
- Selo
- Location within Bashkortostan Location within Russia
- Coordinates: 52°12′N 58°17′E
- Country: Russia
- Region: Bashkortostan
- District: Khaybullinsky District
- Time zone: UTC+5:00

Ufimsky (Russian: Уфимский; Bashkir: Өфө, Öfö) is a rural locality (a selo) and the administrative centre of Ufimsky Selsoviet, Khaybullinsky District, Bashkortostan, Russia. The population was 1,329 as of 2010. There are 14 streets.

== Geography ==
Ufimsky is located 44 km north of Akyar (the district's administrative centre) by road. Alibayevskoye is the nearest rural locality.
