= Sakmar-Nazargulovo =

Sakmar-Nazargulovo Сакмар-Назаргулово
- Village
- Location within Bashkortostan Location within Russia
- Coordinates: 52°15′N 58°17′E
- Country: Russia
- Region: Bashkortostan
- District: Khaybullinsky District
- Time zone: UTC+5:00

Sakmar-Nazargulovo (Russian: Сакмар-Назаргулово; Bashkir: Һаҡмар Наҙарғол, Haqmar Naźarğol) is a rural locality (a village) in Abishevsky Selsoviet, Khaybullinsky District, Bashkortostan, Russia. The population was 120 as of 2010. There is/was 1 street.

== Geography ==
Sakmar-Nazargulovo is located 32 km northeast of Akyar (the district's administrative centre) by road.
