= Tanatar =

Tanatar Танатар
- Village
- Location within Bashkortostan Location within Russia
- Coordinates: 51°46′39″N 58°20′29″E
- Country: Russia
- Region: Bashkortostan
- District: Khaybullinsky District
- Time zone: UTC+5:00

Tanatar (Russian: Танатар; Bashkir: Таңатар, Tañatar) is a rural locality (a village) in Novozirgansky Selsoviet, Khaybullinsky District, Bashkortostan, Russia. The population was 12 as of 2010. There is 1 street.

== Geography ==
Tanatar is located 14 km southeast of Akyar (the district's administrative centre) by road. Novy Zirgan is the nearest rural locality.
