= Sagitovo, Khaybullinsky District, Republic of Bashkortostan =

Sagitovo Сагитово
- Village
- Location within Bashkortostan Location within Russia
- Coordinates: 51°48′N 58°28′E
- Country: Russia
- Region: Bashkortostan
- District: Khaybullinsky District
- Time zone: UTC+5:00

Sagitovo (Russian: Сагитово; Bashkir: Сәғит, Säğit) is a rural locality (a village) in Makansky Selsoviet, Khaybullinsky District, Bashkortostan, Russia. The population was 329 as of 2010. There are 4 streets.

== Geography ==
Sagitovo is located 27 km southeast of Akyar (the district's administrative centre) by road. Novocherkasskoye is the nearest rural locality.
