= Bolshearslangulovo =

Bolshearslangulovo Большеарслангулово
- Selo
- Location within Bashkortostan Location within Russia
- Coordinates: 51°48′N 57°32′E
- Country: Russia
- Region: Bashkortostan
- District: Khaybullinsky District
- Time zone: UTC+5:00

Bolshearslangulovo (Russian: Большеарслангулово; Bashkir: Оло Арыҫланғол, Olo Arıślanğol) is a rural locality (a selo) in Abishevsky Selsoviet, Khaybullinsky District, Bashkortostan, Russia. The population was 136 as of 2010. There are 2 streets.

== Geography ==
Bolshearslangulovo is located 67 km west of Akyar (the district's administrative centre) by road. Bolsheabishevo is the nearest rural locality.
