= Podolsky (rural locality) =

Podolsky (Russian: Подольский; masculine), Podolskaya (Подольская; feminine), or Podolskoye (Подольское; neuter) is the name of several rural localities in Russia:

- Podolsky, Republic of Bashkortostan, a village in Maysky Selsoviet of Iglinsky District of the Republic of Bashkortostan
- Podolsky, Chelyabinsk Oblast, a settlement in Krasninsky Selsoviet of Verkhneuralsky District of Chelyabinsk Oblast
- Podolsky, Krasnodar Krai, a khutor under the administrative jurisdiction of Neftegorsky Settlement Okrug, Apsheronsky District, Krasnodar Krai
- Podolsky, Saratov Oblast, a settlement in Pitersky District of Saratov Oblast
- Podolskoye, Galichsky District, Kostroma Oblast, a village in Orekhovskoye Settlement of Galichsky District of Kostroma Oblast
- Podolskoye, Krasnoselsky District, Kostroma Oblast, a selo in Podolskoye Settlement of Krasnoselsky District of Kostroma Oblast
- Podolskoye, Tver Oblast, a village in Vesyegonsky District of Tver Oblast
- Podolskoye, Vologda Oblast, a village in Podolsky Selsoviet of Ustyuzhensky District of Vologda Oblast
- Podolskoye, Blagoveshchensky Rural Okrug, Bolsheselsky District, Yaroslavl Oblast, a village in Blagoveshchensky Rural Okrug of Bolsheselsky District of Yaroslavl Oblast
- Podolskoye, Markovsky Rural Okrug, Bolsheselsky District, Yaroslavl Oblast, a village in Markovsky Rural Okrug of Bolsheselsky District of Yaroslavl Oblast
- Podolskoye, Breytovsky District, Yaroslavl Oblast, a village in Sutkovsky Rural Okrug of Breytovsky District of Yaroslavl Oblast
- Podolskoye, Nekouzsky District, Yaroslavl Oblast, a village in Nekouzsky Rural Okrug of Nekouzsky District of Yaroslavl Oblast
- Podolskoye, Rybinsky District, Yaroslavl Oblast, a village in Pogorelsky Rural Okrug of Rybinsky District of Yaroslavl Oblast
- Podolskoye, Tutayevsky District, Yaroslavl Oblast, a village in Chebakovsky Rural Okrug of Tutayevsky District of Yaroslavl Oblast
- Podolskaya, Arkhangelsk Oblast, a village in Vyysky Selsoviet of Verkhnetoyemsky District of Arkhangelsk Oblast
- Podolskaya, Novgorod Oblast, a village in Semenovshchinskoye Settlement of Valdaysky District of Novgorod Oblast
- Podolskaya, Vologda Oblast, a village in Terebayevsky Selsoviet of Nikolsky District of Vologda Oblast
