= Urnyak, Khaybullinsky District, Republic of Bashkortostan =

Urnyak Урняк
- Village
- Location within Bashkortostan Location within Russia
- Coordinates: 51°50′N 57°38′E
- Country: Russia
- Region: Bashkortostan
- District: Khaybullinsky District
- Time zone: UTC+5:00

Urnyak (Russian: Урняк; Bashkir: Үрнәк, Ürnäk) is a rural locality (a village) in Abishevsky Selsoviet, Khaybullinsky District, Bashkortostan, Russia. The population was 149 as of 2010. There are 3 streets.

== Geography ==
Urnyak is located 53 km west of Akyar (the district's administrative centre) by road. Chukari-Ivanovka is the nearest rural locality.
