= Nizhneismakovo =

Nizhneismakovo Нижнеисмаково
- Village
- Location within Bashkortostan Location within Russia
- Coordinates: 52°12′N 58°18′E
- Country: Russia
- Region: Bashkortostan
- District: Khaybullinsky District
- Time zone: UTC+5:00

Nizhneismakovo (Russian: Нижнеисмаково; Bashkir: Түбәнге Ысмаҡ, Tübänge Ismaq) is a rural locality (a village) in Ufimsky Selsoviet, Khaybullinsky District, Bashkortostan, Russia. The population was 93 as of 2010. There are 3 streets.

== Geography ==
Nizhneismakovo is located 45 km north of Akyar (the district's administrative centre) by road. Ufimsky is the nearest rural locality.
