= Bakalovka =

Bakalovka Бакаловка
- Village
- Location within Bashkortostan Location within Russia
- Coordinates: 51°59′N 58°31′E
- Country: Russia
- Region: Bashkortostan
- District: Khaybullinsky District
- Time zone: UTC+5:00

Bakalovka (Russian: Бакаловка; Bashkir: Баҡал, Baqal) is a rural locality (a village) in Tanalyksky Selsoviet, Khaybullinsky District, Bashkortostan, Russia. The population was 353 in 2010. There are two streets.

== Geography ==
Bakalovka is located 32 kilometres (20 mi) north of Akyar (the district's administrative centre) by road.
