= Makan, Khaybullinsky District, Republic of Bashkortostan =

Makan Макан
- Selo
- Location within Bashkortostan Location within Russia
- Coordinates: 51°57′N 58°20′E
- Country: Russia
- Region: Bashkortostan
- District: Khaybullinsky District
- Time zone: UTC+5:00

Makan (Russian: Макан; Bashkir: Маҡан, Maqan) is a rural locality (a selo) and the administrative centre of Makansky Selsoviet, Khaybullinsky District, Bashkortostan, Russia. The population was 1,288 as of 2010. There are 12 streets.

== Geography ==
Makan is located 16 km southwest of Akyar (the district's administrative centre) by road. Mambetovo is the nearest rural locality.
