= Bayguskarovo =

Bayguskarovo Байгускарово
- Selo
- Location within Bashkortostan Location within Russia
- Coordinates: 51°55′N 57°58′E
- Country: Russia
- Region: Bashkortostan
- District: Khaybullinsky District
- Time zone: UTC+5:00

Bayguskarovo (Russian: Байгускарово; Bashkir: Байғусҡар, Bayğusqar) is a rural locality (a selo) in Tatyr-Uzyaksky Selsoviet, Khaybullinsky District, Bashkortostan, Russia. The population was 544 as of 2010. There are 8 streets.

== Geography ==
Bayguskarovo is located 27 km northwest of Akyar (the district's administrative centre) by road. Abubakirovo is the nearest rural locality.
