= Tatyr-Uzyak =

Selo in Bashkortostan, Russia

Tatyr-Uzyak Татыр-Узяк
- Selo
- Location within Bashkortostan Location within Russia
- Coordinates: 51°57′N 58°08′E
- Country: Russia
- Region: Bashkortostan
- District: Khaybullinsky District
- Time zone: UTC+5:00

Tatyr-Uzyak (Russian: Татыр-Узяк; Bashkir: Татыр-Үҙәк, Tatır-Üźäk) is a rural locality (a selo) and the administrative center of Tatyr-Uzyaksky Selsoviet, Khaybullinsky District, Bashkortostan, Russia. The population was 1,146 as of 2010. There are 11 streets.

== Geography ==
Tatyr-Uzyak is located 15 km north of Akyar (the district's administrative centre) by road. Buribay is the nearest rural locality.
