= Isyangildino =

Isyangildino Исянгильдино
- Village
- Location within Bashkortostan Location within Russia
- Coordinates: 52°28′N 58°28′E
- Country: Russia
- Region: Bashkortostan
- District: Khaybullinsky District
- Time zone: UTC+5:00

Isyangildino (Russian: Исянгильдино; Bashkir: Иҫәнгилде, İśängilde) is a rural locality (a village) in Tselinny Selsoviet, Khaybullinsky District, Bashkortostan, Russia. The population was 486 as of 2010. There are 7 streets.

== Geography ==
Isyangildino is located 63 km northeast of Akyar (the district's administrative centre) by road. Ishmukhametovo and Abdulnasyrovo are the nearest rural localities.
