= Galiakhmetovo =

Galiakhmetovo Галиахметово
- Selo
- Location within Bashkortostan Location within Russia
- Coordinates: 51°57′N 57°32′E
- Country: Russia
- Region: Bashkortostan
- District: Khaybullinsky District
- Time zone: UTC+5:00

Galiakhmetovo (Russian: Галиахметово; Bashkir: Ғәлиәхмәт, Ğäliäxmät) is a rural locality (a selo) and the administrative centre of Akyulovsky Selsoviet, Khaybullinsky District, Bashkortostan, Russia. The population was 417 as of 2010. There are 8 streets.

== Geography ==
Galiakhmetovois located 61 km northwest of Akyar (the district's administrative centre) by road. Urazbayevo is the nearest rural locality.
