= Sadovy, Khaybullinsky District, Republic of Bashkortostan =

Sadovy Садовый
- Selo
- Location within Bashkortostan Location within Russia
- Coordinates: 51°54′N 58°12′E
- Country: Russia
- Region: Bashkortostan
- District: Khaybullinsky District
- Time zone: UTC+5:00

Sadovy (Russian: Садовый) is a rural locality (a selo) in Akyarsky Selsoviet, Khaybullinsky District, Bashkortostan, Russia. The population was 641 as of 2010. There are 8 streets.

== Geography ==
Sadovy is located 8 km north of Akyar (the district's administrative centre) by road. Akyar is the nearest rural locality.
