= Perevolochan =

Perevolochan Переволочан
- Village
- Location within Bashkortostan Location within Russia
- Coordinates: 51°56′N 58°04′E
- Country: Russia
- Region: Bashkortostan
- District: Khaybullinsky District
- Time zone: UTC+5:00

Perevolochan (Russian: Переволочан) is a rural locality (a village) in Tatyr-Uzyaksky Selsoviet, Khaybullinsky District, Bashkortostan, Russia. The population was 67 as of 2010. There is 1 street.

== Geography ==
Perevolochan is located 20 km northwest of Akyar (the district's administrative centre) by road. Tatyr-Uzyak is the nearest rural locality.
