= Pervomayskoye, Khaybullinsky District, Republic of Bashkortostan =

Pervomayskoye Первомайское
- Selo
- Location within Bashkortostan Location within Russia
- Coordinates: 52°20′N 58°16′E
- Country: Russia
- Region: Bashkortostan
- District: Khaybullinsky District
- Time zone: UTC+5:00

Pervomayskoye (Russian: Первомайское) is a rural locality (a selo) in Ufimsky Selsoviet, Khaybullinsky District, Bashkortostan, Russia. The population was 360 as of 2010. There are 5 streets.

== Geography ==
Pervomayskoye is located 59 km north of Akyar (the district's administrative centre) by road. 1-ye Murzino is the nearest rural locality.
