= Tashtugay =

Tashtugay Таштугай
- Village
- Location within Bashkortostan Location within Russia
- Coordinates: 51°57′N 58°36′E
- Country: Russia
- Region: Bashkortostan
- District: Khaybullinsky District
- Time zone: UTC+5:00

Tashtugay (Russian: Таштугай; Bashkir: Таштуғай, Taştuğay) is a rural locality (a village) in Tanalyksky Selsoviet, Khaybullinsky District, Bashkortostan, Russia. The population was 358 as of 2010. There are 3 streets.

== Geography ==
Tashtugay is located 40 km northeast of Akyar (the district's administrative centre) by road. Bakalovka is the nearest rural locality.
