= Pugachyovo =

Pugachyovo Пугачёво
- Village
- Location within Bashkortostan Location within Russia
- Coordinates: 51°56′N 57°49′E
- Country: Russia
- Region: Bashkortostan
- District: Khaybullinsky District
- Time zone: UTC+5:00

Pugachyovo (Russian: Пугачёво) is a rural locality (a village) in Ivanovsky Selsoviet, Khaybullinsky District, Bashkortostan, Russia. The population was 89 as of 2010. There are 3 streets.

== Geography ==
Pugachyovo is located 40 km northwest of Akyar (the district's administrative centre) by road. Novopetrovskoye is the nearest rural locality.
