= Antingan =

Antingan Антинган
- Selo
- Location within Bashkortostan Location within Russia
- Coordinates: 51°53′N 57°53′E
- Country: Russia
- Region: Bashkortostan
- District: Khaybullinsky District
- Time zone: UTC+5:00

Antingan (Russian: Антинган; Bashkir: Атингән, Atingän) is a rural locality (a selo) and the administrative centre of Antingansky Selsoviet, Khaybullinsky District, Bashkortostan, Russia. The population was 536 as of 2010. There are 14 streets.

== Geography ==
Antingan is located 26 km west of Akyar (the district's administrative centre) by road. Abubakirovo is the nearest rural locality.
