= Aknazarovo, Khaybullinsky District, Republic of Bashkortostan =

Aknazarovo Акназарово
- Village
- Location within Bashkortostan Location within Russia
- Coordinates: 51°55′N 57°38′E
- Country: Russia
- Region: Bashkortostan
- District: Khaybullinsky District
- Time zone: UTC+5:00

Aknazarovo (Russian: Акназарово; Bashkir: Аҡназар, Aqnazar) is a rural locality (a village) in Akyulovsky Selsoviet, Khaybullinsky District, Bashkortostan, Russia. The population was 151 as of 2010. There are 2 streets.

== Geography ==
Aknazarovo is located 49 km west of Akyar (the district's administrative centre) by road. Yantyshevo is the nearest rural locality.
