= Valitovo, Khaybullinsky District, Republic of Bashkortostan =

Valitovo Валитово
- Village
- Location within Bashkortostan Location within Russia
- Coordinates: 52°10′N 58°29′E
- Country: Russia
- Region: Bashkortostan
- District: Khaybullinsky District
- Time zone: UTC+5:00

Valitovo (Russian: Валитово; Bashkir: Вәлит, Wälit) is a rural locality (a village) in Tselinny Selsoviet, Khaybullinsky District, Bashkortostan, Russia. The population was 268 as of 2010. There are 4 streets.

== Geography ==
Valitovo is located 47 km north of Akyar (the district's administrative centre) by road. Komsomolsk is the nearest rural locality.
