= Aktashevo, Khaybullinsky District, Republic of Bashkortostan =

Aktashevo Акташево
- Village
- Location within Bashkortostan Location within Russia
- Coordinates: 51°56′N 57°47′E
- Country: Russia
- Region: Bashkortostan
- District: Khaybullinsky District
- Time zone: UTC+5:00

Aktashevo (Russian: Акташево; Bashkir: Аҡташ, Aqtaş) is a rural locality (a village) in Ivanovsky Selsoviet, Khaybullinsky District, Bashkortostan, Russia. The population was 140 as of 2010. There are 3 streets.

== Geography ==
Aktashevo is located 42 km northwest of Akyar (the district's administrative centre) by road. Pugachevo is the nearest rural locality.
