= Abubakirovo =

Abubakirovo Абубакирово Әбүбәкер
- Village
- Location within Bashkortostan Location within Russia
- Coordinates: 51°52′N 57°57′E
- Country: Russia
- Region: Bashkortostan
- District: Khaybullinsky District
- Time zone: UTC+5:00

Abubakirovo (Russian: Абубакирово, Bashkir: Әбүбәкер, Äbübäker) is a rural locality (a village) in Fyodorovsky Selsoviet of Khaybullinsky District, Bashkortostan, Russia. The population was 640 as of 2010. There are 7 streets.

== Geography ==
Abubakirovo is located 21 km west of Akyar (the district's administrative centre) by road. Antingan is the nearest rural locality.

== Ethnicity ==
The village is inhabited by Bashkirs.
