= Bolsheabishevo =

Bolsheabishevo Большеабишево
- Selo
- Location within Bashkortostan Location within Russia
- Coordinates: 51°46′N 57°29′E
- Country: Russia
- Region: Bashkortostan
- District: Khaybullinsky District
- Time zone: UTC+5:00

Bolsheabishevo (Russian: Большеабишево; Bashkir: Оло Әбеш, Olo Äbeş) is a rural locality (a selo) and the administrative centre of Abishevsky Selsoviet, Khaybullinsky District, Bashkortostan, Russia. The population was 424 as of 2010. There are 7 streets.

== Geography ==
Bolsheabishevo is located 69 km southwest of Akyar (the district's administrative centre) by road. Maloarslangulovo is the nearest rural locality.
