= Maloarslangulovo =

Maloarslangulovo Малоарслангулово
- Village
- Location within Bashkortostan Location within Russia
- Coordinates: 51°47′N 57°29′E
- Country: Russia
- Region: Bashkortostan
- District: Khaybullinsky District
- Time zone: UTC+5:00

Maloarslangulovo (Russian: Малоарслангулово; Bashkir: Бәләкәй Арыҫланғол, Bäläkäy Arıślanğol) is a rural locality (a village) in Abishevsky Selsoviet, Khaybullinsky District, Bashkortostan, Russia. The population was 351 as of 2010. There are 5 streets.

== Geography ==
Maloarslangulovo is located 72 km west of Akyar (the district's administrative centre) by road. Bolsheabishevo is the nearest rural locality.
