= Akyulovo =

Akyulovo Акъюлово
- Village
- Location within Bashkortostan Location within Russia
- Coordinates: 51°53′N 57°30′E
- Country: Russia
- Region: Bashkortostan
- District: Khaybullinsky District
- Time zone: UTC+5:00

Akyulovo (Russian: Акъюлово; Bashkir: Аҡъюл, Aqyul) is a rural locality (a village) in Akyulovsky Selsoviet, Khaybullinsky District, Bashkortostan, Russia. The population was 84 as of 2010. There are 2 streets.

== Geography ==
Akyulovo is located 70 km west of Akyar (the district's administrative centre) by road. Galiakhmetovo is the nearest rural locality.
