= Savelyevka, Khaybullinsky District, Republic of Bashkortostan =

Savelyevka Савельевка
- Selo
- Location within Bashkortostan Location within Russia
- Coordinates: 52°04′N 58°32′E
- Country: Russia
- Region: Bashkortostan
- District: Khaybullinsky District
- Time zone: UTC+5:00

Savelyevka (Russian: Савельевка) is a rural locality (a selo) in Tanalyksky Selsoviet, Khaybullinsky District, Bashkortostan, Russia. The population was 205 as of 2010. There are 3 streets.

== Geography ==
Savelyevka is located 34 km northeast of Akyar (the district's administrative centre) by road. Podolsk is the nearest rural locality.
