= Buzavlyk =

Buzavlyk Бузавлык
- Village
- Location within Bashkortostan Location within Russia
- Coordinates: 52°05′N 58°06′E
- Country: Russia
- Region: Bashkortostan
- District: Khaybullinsky District
- Time zone: UTC+5:00

Buzavlyk (Russian: Бузавлык; Bashkir: Быҙаулыҡ, Bıźawlıq) is a rural locality (a village) in Samarsky Selsoviet, Khaybullinsky District, Bashkortostan, Russia. The population was 352 as of 2010. There are 4 streets.

== Geography ==
Buzavlyk is located 29 km north of Akyar (the district's administrative centre) by road. Khvorostyanskoye is the nearest rural locality.
