= Mambetovo =

Mambetovo Мамбетово
- Village
- Location within Bashkortostan Location within Russia
- Coordinates: 51°51′N 58°25′E
- Country: Russia
- Region: Bashkortostan
- District: Khaybullinsky District
- Time zone: UTC+5:00

Mambetovo (Russian: Мамбетово; Bashkir: Мәмбәт, Mämbät) is a rural locality (a village) in Makansky Selsoviet, Khaybullinsky District, Bashkortostan, Russia. The population was 529 as of 2010. There are 7 streets.

== Geography ==
Mambetovo is located 25 km east of Akyar (the district's administrative centre) by road. Sagitovo is the nearest rural locality.
