= Novy Zirgan =

Novy Zirgan Новый Зирган
- Selo
- Location within Bashkortostan Location within Russia
- Coordinates: 51°47′N 58°17′E
- Country: Russia
- Region: Bashkortostan
- District: Khaybullinsky District
- Time zone: UTC+5:00

Novy Zirgan (Russian: Новый Зирган; Bashkir: Яңы Ергән, Yañı Yergän) is a rural locality (a selo) and the administrative centre of Novozirgansky Selsoviet, Khaybullinsky District, Bashkortostan, Russia. The population was 629 as of 2010. There are 3 streets.

== Geography ==
Novy Zirgan is located 11 km southeast of Akyar (the district's administrative centre) by road. Tanatar is the nearest rural locality.
