= 1st Murzino =

1st Murzino 1-е Мурзино 1-се Мырҙа 1-se Mırźa
- Village
- Location within Bashkortostan Location within Russia
- Coordinates: 52.314722°N 58.215278°E
- Country: Russia
- Region: Bashkortostan
- District: Khaybullinsky District
- Time zone: UTC+05:00

1st Murzino (Russian: 1-е Мурзино; Bashkir: 1-се Мырҙа, 1-se Mırźa) is a rural locality (a village) in Ufimsky Selsoviet of Khaybullinsky District, Russia. The population was 222 as of 2010.

== Geography ==
1st Murzino is located 61 km north of Akyar (the district's administrative centre) by road. Pervomayskoye is the nearest rural locality.

== Streets ==
- Gareeva
- Gafury
- Zaki Validi
- Pobedy
- S. Yulaeva
