= Urazbayevo, Khaybullinsky District, Republic of Bashkortostan =

Urazbayevo Уразбаево
- Village
- Location within Bashkortostan Location within Russia
- Coordinates: 51°58′N 57°26′E
- Country: Russia
- Region: Bashkortostan
- District: Khaybullinsky District
- Time zone: UTC+5:00

Urazbayevo (Russian: Уразбаево; Bashkir: Ураҙбай, Uraźbay) is a rural locality (a village) in Akyulovsky Selsoviet, Khaybullinsky District, Bashkortostan, Russia. The population was 147 as of 2010. There are 5 streets.

== Geography ==
Urazbayevo is located 32 km northeast of Akyar (the district's administrative centre) by road.
