= Buribay =

Buribay Бурибай
- Selo
- Location within Bashkortostan Location within Russia
- Coordinates: 51°57′N 58°09′E
- Country: Russia
- Region: Bashkortostan
- District: Khaybullinsky District
- Time zone: UTC+5:00

Buribay (Russian: Бурибай; Bashkir: Бүребай, Bürebay) is a rural locality (a selo) and the administrative centre of Buribayevsky Selsoviet, Khaybullinsky District, Bashkortostan, Russia. The population was 315 as of 2010. There are 39 streets.

== Geography ==
Buribay is located 14 km north of Akyar (the district's administrative centre) by road. Tatyr-Uzyak is the nearest rural locality.
