= Komsomolsk, Khaybullinsky District, Republic of Bashkortostan =

Komsomolsk Комсомольск
- Village
- Location within Bashkortostan Location within Russia
- Coordinates: 52°10′N 58°29′E
- Country: Russia
- Region: Bashkortostan
- District: Khaybullinsky District
- Time zone: UTC+5:00

Komsomolsk (Russian: Комсомольск) is a rural locality (a village) in Tselinny Selsoviet, Khaybullinsky District, Bashkortostan, Russia. The population was 302 as of 2010. There are 9 streets.

== Geography ==
Komsomolsk is located 48 km northeast of Akyar (the district's administrative centre) by road. Valitovo is the nearest rural locality.
