= Ilyachevo =

Ilyachevo Илячево
- Village
- Location within Bashkortostan Location within Russia
- Coordinates: 51°45′N 58°12′E
- Country: Russia
- Region: Bashkortostan
- District: Khaybullinsky District
- Time zone: UTC+5:00

Ilyachevo (Russian: Илячево; Bashkir: Иләс, İläs) is a rural locality (a village) in Novozirgansky Selsoviet, Khaybullinsky District, Bashkortostan, Russia. The population was 359 as of 2010. There are 5 streets.

== Geography ==
Ilyachevo is located 18 km south of Akyar (the district's administrative centre) by road. Stepnoy is the nearest rural locality.
