= Podolsk (inhabited locality) =

Podolsk (Russian: Подо́льск) is the name of several inhabited localities in Russia.

Urban localities

- Podolsk, a city in Moscow Oblast; administratively incorporated as a city under oblast jurisdiction

Rural localities

- Podolsk, Republic of Bashkortostan, a selo in Tanalyksky Selsoviet of Khaybullinsky District of the Republic of Bashkortostan
- Podolsk (Novosibirsk Oblast), a village in Bagansky District of Novosibirsk Oblast
- Podolsk, Omsk Oblast, a village in Roshchinsky Rural Okrug of Gorkovsky District of Omsk Oblast
- Podolsk, Orenburg Oblast, a selo in Podolsky Selsoviet of Krasnogvardeysky District of Orenburg Oblast
- Podolsk, Tomsk Oblast, a selo in Bakcharsky District of Tomsk Oblast
