= Abdulnasyrovo =

Abdulnasyrovo Абдулнасырово Әбделнасир Äbdelnasir
- Village
- Location within Bashkortostan Location within Russia
- Coordinates: 52°16′N 58°24′E
- Country: Russia
- Region: Bashkortostan
- District: Khaybullinsky District
- Time zone: [[UTC+5:00]]

Abdulnasyrovo (Russian: Абдулнасырово; Bashkir: Әбделнасир, Äbdelnasir) is a rural locality (a village) in Tselinny Selsoviet of Khaybullinsky District, Bashkortostan, Russia. The population was 150 as of 2010. There is 1 street.

== Geography ==
Abdulnasyrovo is located 65 km north of Akyar (the district's administrative centre) by road. Rafikovo is the nearest rural locality.

== Ethnicity ==
The village is inhabited by Bashkirs.
