= Podolsk, Republic of Bashkortostan =

Podolsk Подольск
- Selo
- Location within Bashkortostan Location within Russia
- Coordinates: 52°02′N 58°26′E
- Country: Russia
- Region: Bashkortostan
- District: Khaybullinsky District
- Time zone: UTC+5:00

Podolsk (Russian: Подольск) is a rural locality (a selo) and the administrative centre of Tanalyksky Selsoviet, Khaybullinsky District, Bashkortostan, Russia. The population was 1,083 as of 2010. There are 12 streets.

== Geography ==
Podolsk is located 27 km northeast of Akyar (the district's administrative centre) by road. Bakalovka is the nearest rural locality.
