= Alibayevskoye =

Alibayevskoye Алибаевское
- Selo
- Location within Bashkortostan Location within Russia
- Coordinates: 52°14′N 58°17′E
- Country: Russia
- Region: Bashkortostan
- District: Khaybullinsky District
- Time zone: UTC+5:00

Alibayevskoye (Russian: Алибаевское; Bashkir: Әлебай, Älebay) is a rural locality (a selo) in Ufimsky Selsoviet, Khaybullinsky District, Bashkortostan, Russia. The population was 315 as of 2010. There are 5 streets.

== Geography ==
Alibayevskoye is located 46 km north of Akyar (the district's administrative centre) by road. Rafikovo is the nearest rural locality.
