= Podolsk (disambiguation) =

Podolsk is a city in Moscow Oblast, Russia.

Podolsk may also refer to:

- Podolsk (inhabited locality), name of several other inhabited localities in Russia
- Podolsk Governorate, a governorate of Imperial Russia, now in Ukraine
- Kamianets-Podilskyi (also known as Kamenets-Podolsk), a city in Ukraine
