= Podolskoye, Vologda Oblast =

Podolskoye Подольское
- Village
- Location within Vologda Oblast Location within Russia
- Coordinates: 58°39′N 36°22′E
- Country: Russia
- Region: Vologda Oblast
- District: Ustyuzhensky District
- Time zone: UTC+3:00

Podolskoye (Russian: Подольское) is a rural locality (a village) in Nikiforovskoye Rural Settlement, Ustyuzhensky District, Vologda Oblast, Russia. The population was 3 as of 2002. There are 2 streets.

== Geography ==
Podolskoye is located 28 km (17 mi) south of Ustyuzhna (the district's administrative centre) by road. Melechino is the nearest rural locality.
