= Podolskaya, Vologda Oblast =

Podolskaya Подольская
- Village
- Location within Vologda Oblast Location within Russia
- Coordinates: 59°46′N 45°19′E
- Country: Russia
- Region: Vologda Oblast
- District: Nikolsky District
- Time zone: UTC+3:00

Podolskaya (Russian: Подольская) is a rural locality (a village) in Terebayevskoye Rural Settlement, Nikolsky District, Vologda Oblast, Russia. The population was 27 as of 2002.

== Geography ==
Podolskaya is located 33 km northwest of Nikolsk (the district's administrative centre) by road. Chelpanovo is the nearest rural locality.
