= Podolsky, Republic of Bashkortostan =

Podolsky Подольский
- Village
- Location within Bashkortostan Location within Russia
- Coordinates: 54°51′N 56°59′E
- Country: Russia
- Region: Bashkortostan
- District: Iglinsky District
- Time zone: UTC+5:00

Podolsky (Russian: Подольский) is a rural locality (a village) in Maysky Selsoviet, Iglinsky District, Bashkortostan, Russia. The population was 23 as of 2010. There is 1 street.

== Geography ==
Podolsky is located 50 km east of Iglino (the district's administrative centre) by road. Surazhsky is the nearest rural locality.
