= Lukas Podolski =

Polish-born German footballer (born 1985)

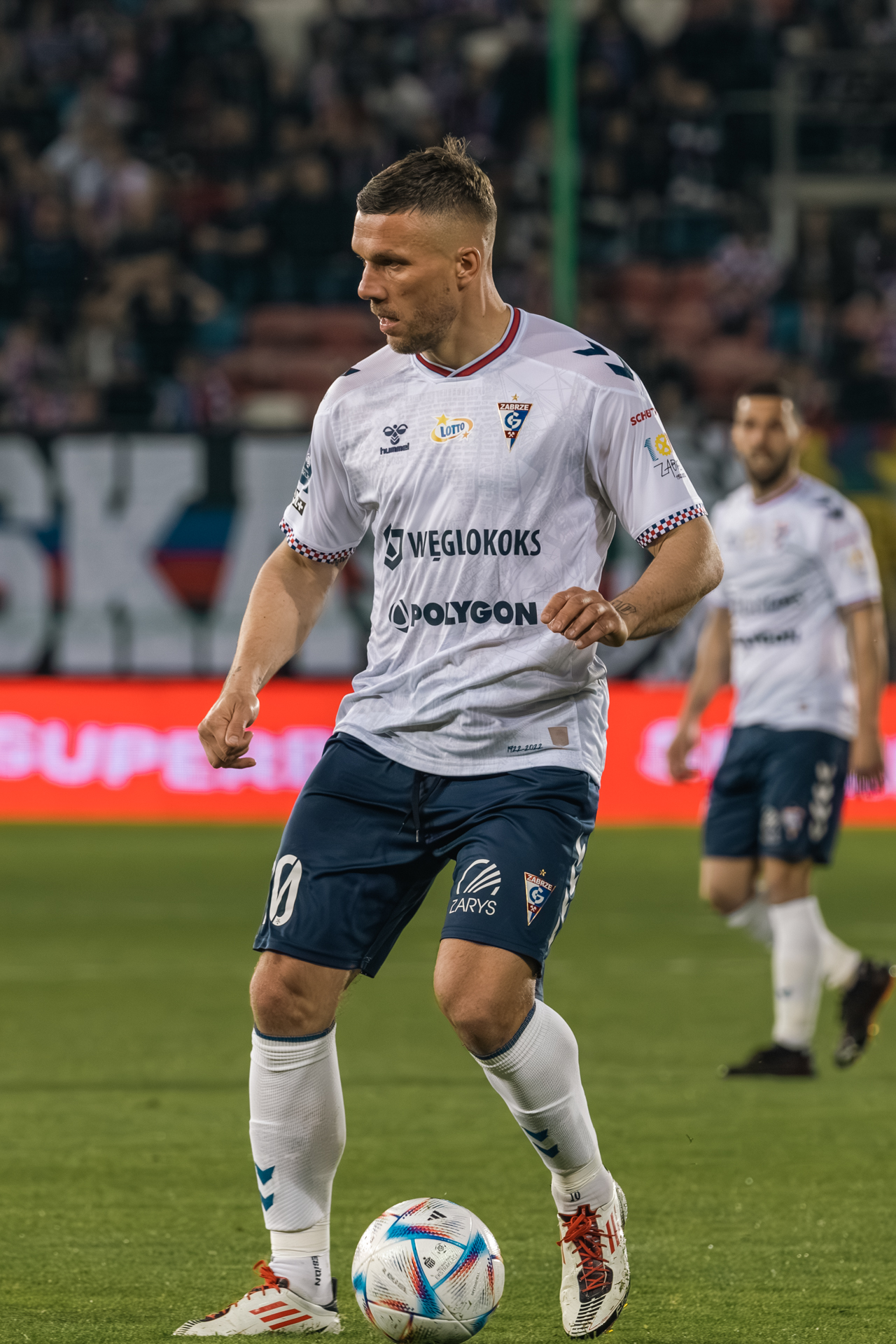
- Podolski playing for Górnik Zabrze in 2023

Personal information
- Full name: Lukas Josef Podolski
- Birth name: Łukasz Józef Podolski
- Date of birth: 4 June 1985 (age 41)
- Place of birth: Gliwice, Poland
- Height: 1.83 m (6 ft 0 in)
- Positions: Striker; left winger

Youth career
- 1991–1995: FC 07 Bergheim
- 1995–2003: 1. FC Köln

Senior career*
Years	Team	Apps	(Gls)
2003–2004	1. FC Köln II	2	(0)
2003–2006	1. FC Köln	81	(46)
2006–2009	Bayern Munich	71	(15)
2007–2008	Bayern Munich II	2	(0)
2009–2012	1. FC Köln	88	(33)
2012–2015	Arsenal	60	(19)
2015	→ Inter Milan (loan)	17	(1)
2015–2017	Galatasaray	56	(20)
2017–2020	Vissel Kobe	52	(15)
2020–2021	Antalyaspor	40	(6)
2021–2026	Górnik Zabrze	125	(23)
Total		594	(178)

International career
2001–2002	Germany U17	6	(2)
2002–2003	Germany U18	7	(4)
2003	Germany U19	3	(6)
2004	Germany U21	5	(0)
2004–2017	Germany	130	(49)
Medal record
Men's football
Representing Germany
FIFA World Cup
Winner	2014 Brazil	Team
Third place	2006 Germany	Team
Third place	2010 South Africa	Team
UEFA European Championship
Runner-up	2008 Austria–Switzerland	Team
Third place	2012 Poland–Ukraine	Team
FIFA Confederations Cup
Third place	2005 Germany	Team
- * Club domestic league appearances and goals

Lukas Josef Podolski (German: [ˈluːkas poˈdɔlskiː]; born Łukasz Józef Podolski, Polish: [ˈwukaʂ pɔˈdɔlskʲi], 4 June 1985) is a former professional footballer who played as a striker or left winger. Born in Poland, he played for the Germany national team. He is the current owner of Ekstraklasa club Górnik Zabrze, for whom he played before his retirement in 2026. He was known for his powerful and accurate left foot, explosive shooting, technique and probing attacks from the left side.

Podolski joined 1. FC Köln in 1995 where he made it into the first team in 2003 resulting in 81 appearances for the club before moving to Bayern Munich. With Bayern, Podolski won the Bundesliga and DFB-Pokal double in 2008. Podolski returned to 1. FC Köln in 2009. He later signed for Premier League club Arsenal in 2012, with whom he won the FA Cup in 2014. He then moved on loan to Serie A club Inter Milan in January 2015, before signing six months later for Galatasaray where he also won the Turkish Cup of 2016. In 2017, he moved to Vissel Kobe in Japan, spending three seasons there before moving back to Turkey to play for Antalyaspor. In 2021, he moved to Górnik Zabrze in Poland and in May 2026, they won the Polish Cup, his first with the club. Later that month, he became Górnik's majority owner and announced his retirement from professional football.

Born in Poland, Podolski moved to Germany at the age of two. He was eligible to play for both Poland and Germany. He represented Germany at youth level, making his first appearance for the senior team in 2004. Podolski enjoyed great success with the Germany national team. He was part of the squad in seven major tournaments, winning the 2014 FIFA World Cup. He is the fourth most-capped player in German history, with 130 caps, and the third-highest goalscorer in German history, having scored 49 times. In May 2013, Podolski scored the fastest goal in Germany national team history, and the second fastest international goal in history at that time, after just nine seconds against Ecuador. Podolski retired from international football on 22 March 2017 after scoring the winner as captain in a friendly against England.

== Club career ==
=== 1. FC Köln ===
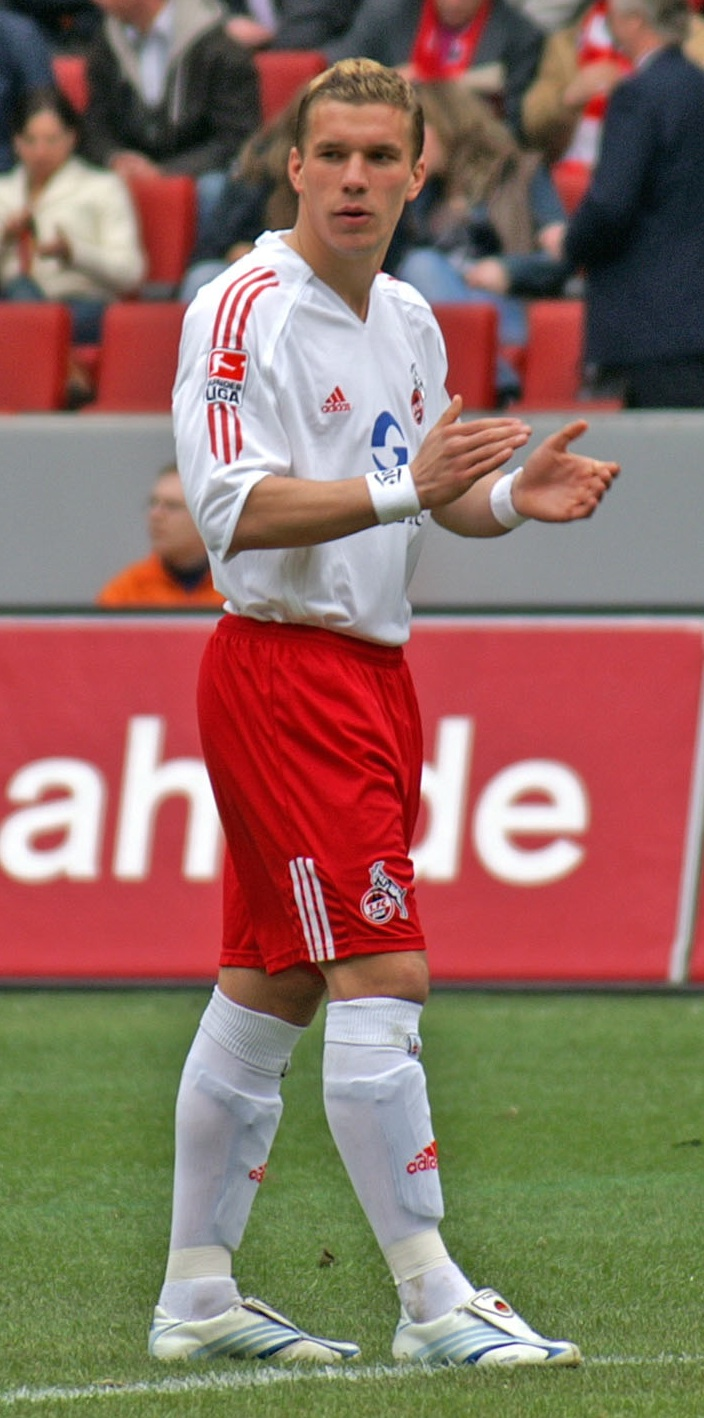
Podolski playing for Köln in 2006

Podolski began playing football at the age of six in the youth team of FC 07 Bergheim, where he played until he joined 1. FC Köln at the age of ten. It was there that Podolski's talents were first noticed. In 2003, at the age of 18, Podolski was still part of the club's youth side. At this time the club found itself in dire straits battling to avoid relegation from the Bundesliga. First team boss Marcel Koller, working on a shoestring budget, invited Podolski to train with the senior players and he made his top flight debut shortly afterwards on 22 November 2003. Even though Köln failed to avoid a drop to the 2nd division, Podolski had shown what he could do, scoring 10 goals in his first 19 senior appearances. This was the best tally by an 18-year-old in the history of the Bundesliga until Florian Wirtz overtook the record in 2021.

Though his call up to the German Euro 2004 squad brought along interest from several top clubs, Podolski stayed at Köln to help the club gain promotion in the 2004–05 season. With 24 goals, Podolski advanced to become the league's best scorer. Somewhat unusually, Podolski remained part of the Germany squad, even though he did not play in the national top-tier league.

After Köln were promoted, the pressure was on Podolski to keep the club in the Bundesliga practically singlehandedly. Podolski managed to score 12 goals in the 2005–06 season, but eventually, Köln were relegated again. It became clear that Podolski would not stay again to push them through the 2006–07 season—even more so, as Podolski was becoming an integral part of the national team.

=== FC Bayern Munich ===
In 2006, clubs such as Liverpool, Bayern Munich, Hamburger SV, Werder Bremen, and Real Madrid manifested their interest in Podolski, even though he had a contract with 1. FC Köln through 2007. On 1 June 2006, Podolski announced that a transfer agreement had been reached with Bayern Munich, allowing him to join the Bavarian side for the 2006–07 season. Financial details of the deal were not immediately available, but the transfer fee was speculated to be around €10 million. He made his Bundesliga debut for Bayern on 11 August 2006, coming on as a substitute in the 88th minute of a 2–0 victory against Borussia Dortmund. On 9 September 2006, he came on as a second-half substitute in a DFB-Pokal game versus FC St. Pauli. Only 26 seconds after the second half started, he scored the equaliser, levelling the match at 1–1. On 14 October 2006, with his first Bundesliga goal for Bayern, Podolski helped to secure the club's 4–2 win over Hertha BSC. On 26 October 2006, Podolski suffered a serious injury to his right ankle joint caused by teammate, Mark van Bommel, during a training session. Consequently, Podolski missed more than five match weeks. He returned from this injury and scored against Alemannia Aachen.

After Bayern bought in Italian striker Luca Toni in 2007, Podolski received less playing time due to coach Ottmar Hitzfeld's preference to partner Miroslav Klose and Toni together instead. However, Bayern ended the 2007–08 season by winning a league and cup double, giving Podolski the first major silverware of his career.

Despite former national team coach Jürgen Klinsmann taking charge of Bayern for the 2008–09 season, Podolski again failed to break into the team's regular first choice line-up. After a rather unhappy spell at Bayern, he returned to former club Köln on 1 July 2009.

=== Return to 1. FC Köln ===
After Podolski was assured by national team coach Joachim Löw that a return to FC Köln would not harm his chances of international football, an agreement to sign him was agreed between Bayern Munich and Köln in January 2009, although he would not return to Köln until the start of the summer transfer window. On 1 July, Podolski returned to Köln on a four-year contract, at a reported fee of around €10 million, equivalent to the fee Bayern paid to sign him in 2006. Köln created a website where people were able to buy pixels of an image of Podolski for €25 per 8x8 pixel square, in order to gather €1 million to reduce the cost of the transfer; Formula One driver and Köln supporter Michael Schumacher bought several pixels for €875.

Having just moved from Bayern Munich, Podolski had a poor first season at Köln, scoring just three times the entire season. One of his goals however, came from a free kick against his former club to salvage a draw.

In the 2010–11 season, Podolski scored his 50th Bundesliga goal in the match against Hannover 96 in March 2011. Throughout the entire season, Podolski scored 13 goals and made seven assists.

The 2011–12 season was the final season in his second spell for Köln. Despite the team's relegation to the 2. Bundesliga, Podolski scored 18 goals in 29 league Bundesliga appearances.

Out of respect for his loyalty and achievements for the club, 1. FC Köln chose to retire his famous No. 10 shirt as long as he is an active football player. However, Köln began assigning the number 10 shirt again at the start of the 2014–15 Bundesliga season.

=== Arsenal ===
==== 2012–13 season ====
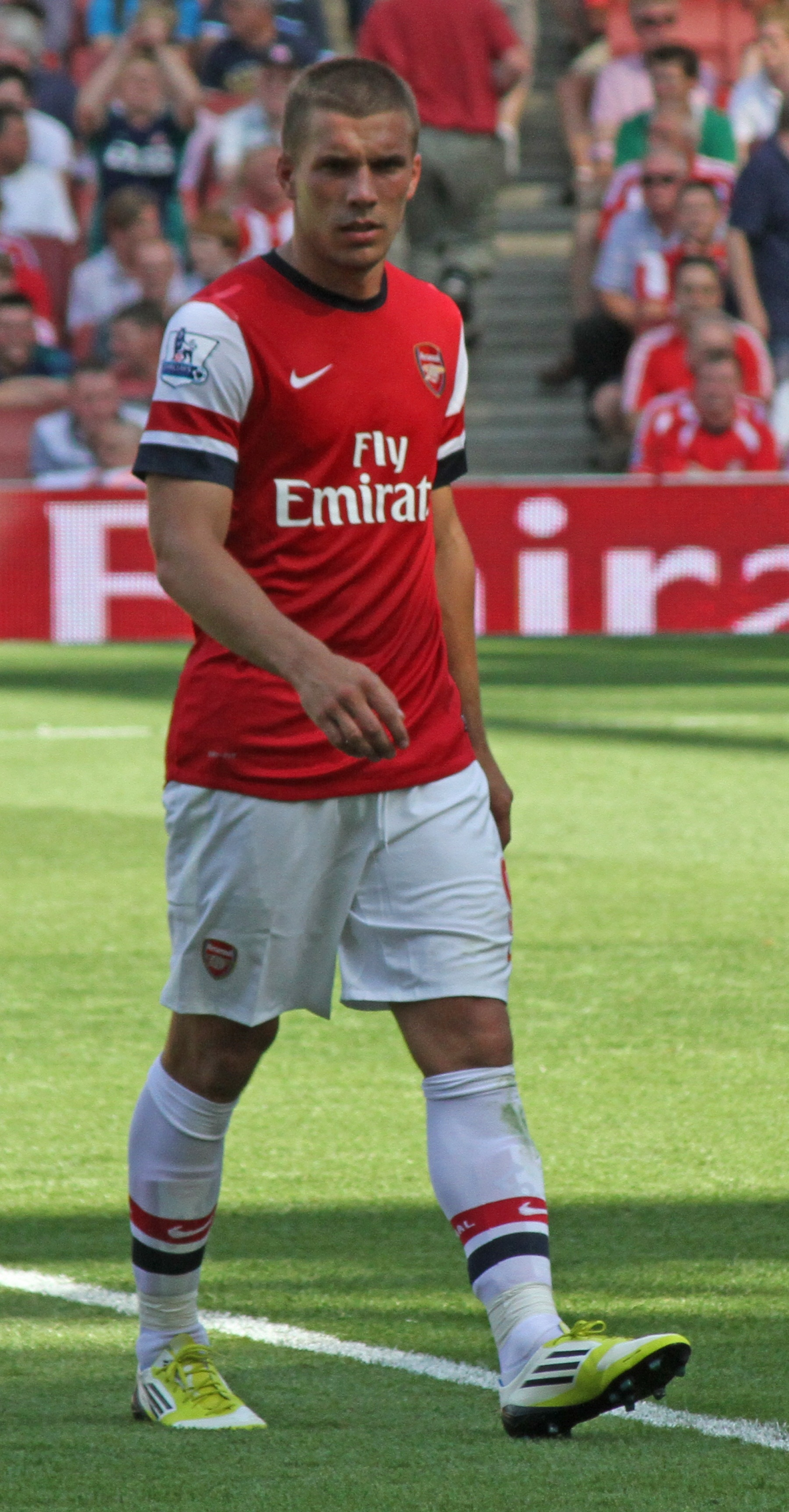
Podolski playing for Arsenal in 2012

Podolski was linked with Premier League club Arsenal throughout the 2012 winter transfer window but no deal materialised. However, on 30 April 2012, it was officially announced that Podolski had signed for Arsenal on a long-term deal, for an undisclosed fee. On 12 August 2012, Podolski started for Arsenal in a pre-season match against his former club, Köln, scoring twice, once from a penalty in a 4–0 victory. Podolski took the number 9 from Park Chu-Young, who had been loaned out to Celta Vigo, after the number 10 shirt vacated by Robin van Persie was given to Jack Wilshere. Podolski then started in his first official match for Arsenal against Sunderland on the opening day of the Premier League on 18 August 2012. He played 63 minutes before being subbed off for another 2012 summer signing, Olivier Giroud, in the match which finished 0–0. He scored his first goal for Arsenal on 2 September in a 2–0 win against Liverpool at Anfield whilst also providing the assist for Santi Cazorla to score his first for the Gunners. Podolski scored his second goal for Arsenal in the following game, scoring a free-kick from 25 yards in a 6–1 victory against Southampton.

On 18 September 2012, he scored his first UEFA Champions League goal for the Gunners in a 2–1 away win against Montpellier. In Arsenal's second game in the Champions League, Podolski scored again as Arsenal defeated Greek champions Olympiacos 3–1 on 3 October. Podolski then scored his first goal in more than a month against Fulham in a thrilling 3–3 draw. On 17 November, Podolski scored his fourth League goal as Arsenal defeated Tottenham 5–2 in the North London derby. He then helped Arsenal qualify for the last 16 of the Champions League by scoring the second goal as Arsenal beat Montpellier 2–0. Podolski then played a pivotal part in an impressive 5–2 win away from home against Reading at the Madejski Stadium, scoring the first goal and assisting 2 more, which had helped teammate Santi Cazorla to score his first ever hat-trick. On 30 December 2012, Podolski played an integral part of the team that beat Newcastle 7–3. His first contribution was an incisive pass to Theo Walcott for Arsenal's first goal. In addition, due to Newcastle's failure to clear the ball off their line, Podolski pounced on a header for his last goal of 2012. He was substituted for Aaron Ramsey to a standing ovation.

On 23 January 2013, Podolski produced an impressive performance as Arsenal beat West Ham 5–1, scoring one goal and setting up three others. On 2 February 2013, Podolski scored the only goal via a deflected free-kick to earn the Gunners a 1–0 victory over Stoke City. On 13 April, Podolski sealed a 3–1 win over Norwich City by scoring his first goal since February. After Giroud's three-game ban appeal was rejected, Podolski began playing as a centre forward, starting with the 1–1 draw against Manchester United. Podolski then scored twice in a 4–1 victory over Wigan Athletic, resulting in Wigan's relegation from the Premier League. Podolski ended his first season in Arsenal with a total of 16 goals and 11 assists.

==== 2013–14 season ====
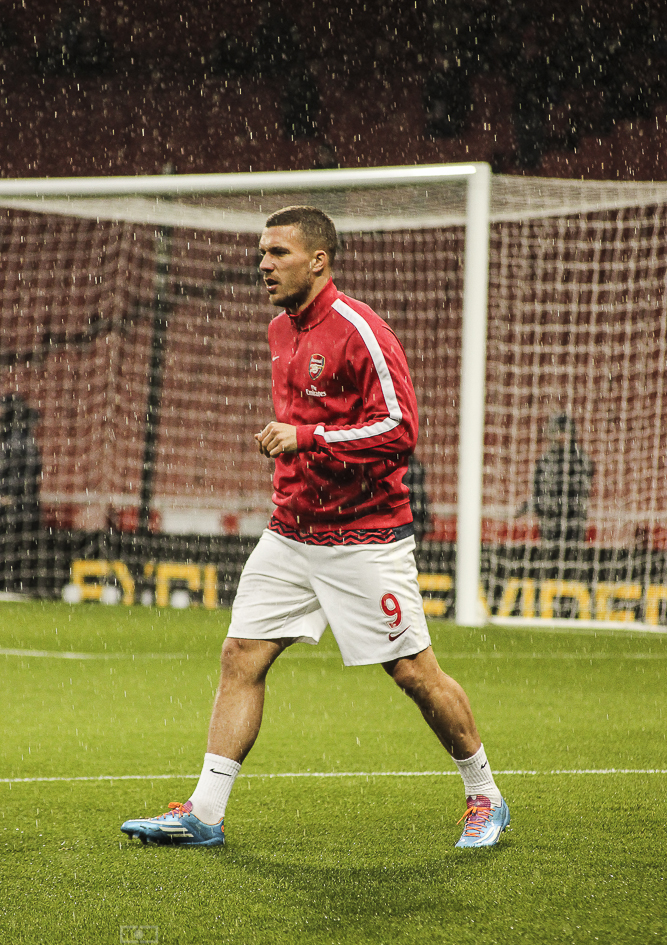
Podolski warming up for Arsenal in 2014

On 24 August 2013, Podolski netted his first goals of the 2013–14 season, scoring twice for Arsenal away at Fulham in a 3–1 win. However, he was injured in his next match in the Champions League qualifier against Fenerbahçe and was ruled out for 10 weeks. Podolski returned for Arsenal against West Ham United in a 3–1 win on Boxing Day, scoring the team's third goal in the 79th minute. Podolski netted his first two goals in 2014 with a brace in a 4–0 FA Cup fourth round win over Coventry City. He later scored in a 2–1 FA Cup win over Liverpool in February to send Arsenal through to the quarter-finals of the competition. Podolski scored two goals in March as he began to feature more regularly in the Gunners starting line-up. His first was a goal against his former club, FC Bayern Munich, in the return leg of the UEFA Champions League last 16 tie. Podolski's goal proved nothing more than a consolation, as Arsenal crashed out of Europe, losing 3–1 on aggregate to the defending champions. His second goal in March was an equaliser against Swansea City in the Premier League clash. A minute after scoring, Podolski provided an assist for teammate Olivier Giroud, who gave Arsenal a 2–1 lead. However, a last minute own goal by Mathieu Flamini meant the game finished 2–2 and effectively ended Arsenal's hopes of lifting the Premier League title for another season. Arsenal qualified for the FA Cup final on 12 April following a win against Wigan, in which Podolski was substituted after 68 minutes. He scored twice in Arsenal's next game, a 3–1 win against West Ham United at the Emirates Stadium and followed that display up with another brace in Arsenal's next game, a 3–0 win away to Hull City. He started in the 2014 FA Cup Final against Hull City and left the pitch for Yaya Sanogo after 61 minutes as Hull led Arsenal 1–2. Arsenal went on to win the game 3–2 after extra time, thereby ending the club's nine-year trophy drought.

==== 2014–15 season ====
After winning the World Cup for Germany, Podolski and compatriots Per Mertesacker and Mesut Özil were excused by Arsenal from the 2014 Community Shield, which they won 3–0 against Manchester City.

In November, Podolski spoke about his unrest with his current role with Arsenal and his lack of game time, saying: "Of course I am not happy with my situation right now. I can't be satisfied with that. It is hard when you can't do what you love."

==== Inter Milan (loan) ====
On 5 January 2015, Arsenal announced that Podolski had completed a move to Serie A club Inter Milan on loan for the remainder of the 2014–15 season. He joined the side for training after the deal was finalised ahead of their league match away to Juventus on 6 January. In the 1–1 draw at the Juventus Stadium, he came on as a substitute for Zdravko Kuzmanović after 54 minutes. Podolski was not named in Inter's squad list for the knockout stages of the UEFA Europa League with coach Roberto Mancini preferring Xherdan Shaqiri over the German international. On 28 April 2015, Podolski scored his only goal with Inter to win the match 2–1 in the 65th minute against Udinese.

=== Galatasaray ===
Podolski signed a three-year contract with Turkish club Galatasaray on 4 July 2015 for an initial fee of £1.8 million, after which the Süper Lig champions will pay Arsenal £2.1 million for three consecutive seasons thereafter. He instantly won the Turkish Super Cup. In the final of the Turkish Cup on 26 May 2016, he scored the decisive goal for Galatasaray in the 1–0 win over Fenerbahçe.

=== Vissel Kobe ===
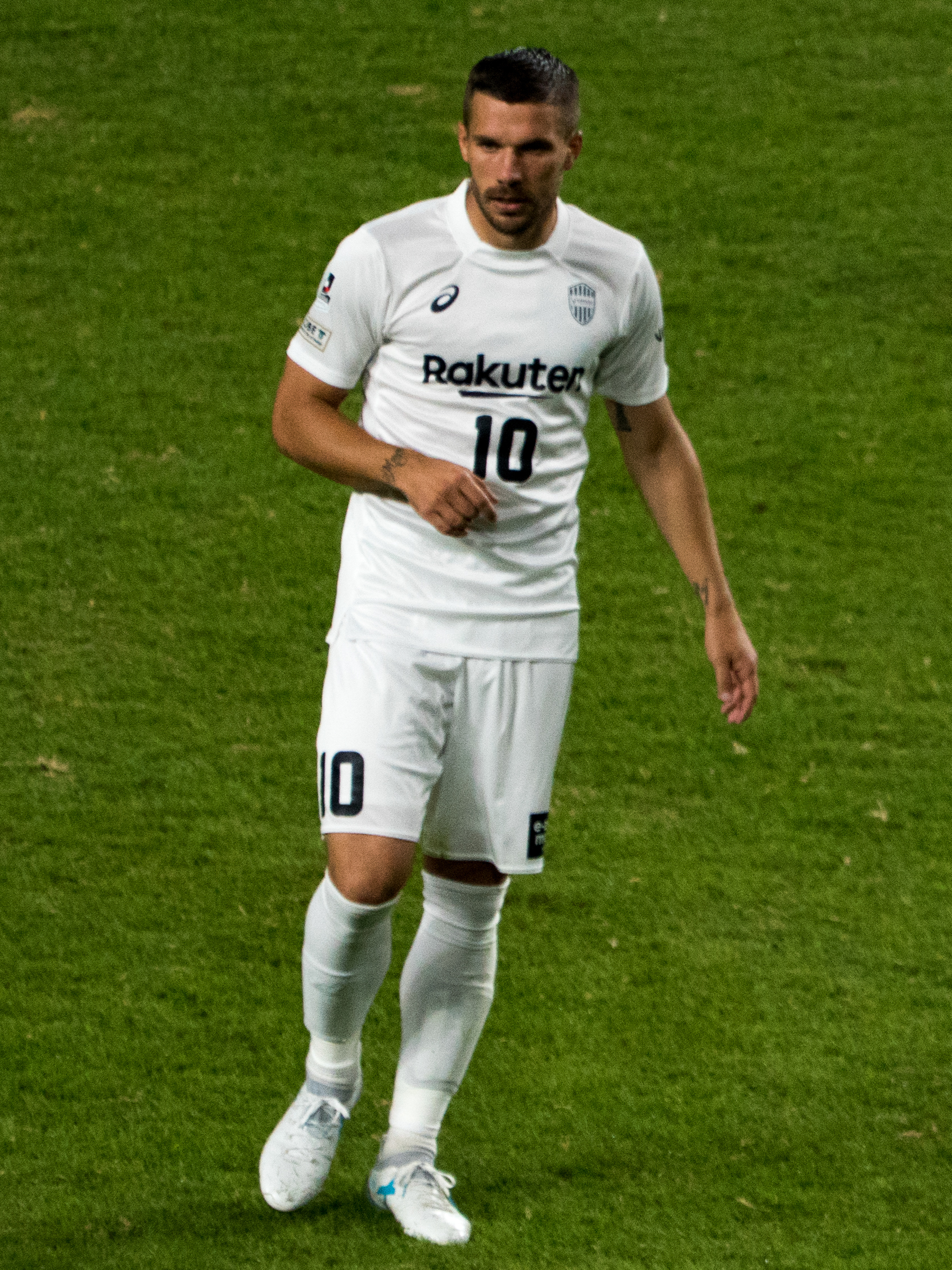
Podolski playing for Vissel Kobe in 2017

On 2 March 2017, Podolski announced his transfer to Japanese club Vissel Kobe after the completion of the Turkish season. On 29 July 2017, he played his first match for Vissel Kobe and scored two goals in a 3–1 win over Omiya Ardija in the J1 League. On 11 August 2018, he assisted Andrés Iniesta's first goal in the J1 League in a 2–1 win over Jubilo Iwata.

On 8 December 2019, he scored a hat-trick in a 4–1 win over Júbilo Iwata. It was his first hat-trick in the J1 League.

On 1 January 2020, Podolski won his first trophy in Japan, starting in Vissel Kobe's 2–0 victory over Kashima Antlers in the final of the 2019 Emperor's Cup; it was also the club's first ever major trophy.

=== Antalyaspor ===
On 23 January 2020, Podolski joined Antalyaspor on a one-and-a-half-year contract.

=== Górnik Zabrze ===
On 6 July 2021, Podolski was announced by the Ekstraklasa club Górnik Zabrze, having signed a one-year contract that comes with the option of another year, and with the club being probably his last club before retiring, after stating it's his dream to finish his footballing career playing for Górnik. He made his debut on 30 July, coming on as a substitute in a 3–1 league home defeat against Lech Poznań at the Arena Zabrze. On 21 November 2021, he scored his first goal for Górnik Zabrze, in the Ekstraklasa home fixture against Legia Warsaw 3–2.

On 19 May 2022, Podolski agreed to a one-year contract extension. Later that year, on 5 November, he scored a goal from inside his own half in a 4–1 away win against Pogoń Szczecin. On 19 May 2023, he extended his Górnik contract until 2025. In May 2025, he signed a one-year contract extension. In December 2025, he acquired 8.3% of the shares of Górnik through his company LP Holding GmbH, becoming the second largest shareholder of the club.

On 2 May 2026, Podolski achieved his first title with the club, following a 2–0 win over Raków Częstochowa in the Polish Cup final, Górnik's first silverware in 38 years. On 21 May 2026, he became the majority owner of Górnik after acquiring 86% of the club's shares from the Zabrze local government. A day later, he announced that he would retire from professional football at the end of the 2025–26 season. He played his final match on 23 May 2026, coming on as a subtitute in a 6–2 league home victory against Radomiak Radom at the Arena Zabrze, securing the second place in Ekstraklasa. Podolski played over 550 top-flight matches in his career in which he scored more than 150 goals.

== International career ==
=== International debut and breakthrough ===
In late 2003, after several impressive performances in his first few Bundesliga games, Polish media suggested then-Poland national team coach Paweł Janas should check Podolski out, as he was still eligible to play for Poland. Janas ignored the request stating in one of the press interviews that "as for today we have much better strikers in Poland and I don't see a reason to call up a player just because he played one or two good matches in the Bundesliga. He's not even a regular starter at his club." By that time Podolski was still interested in representing Poland, but as the season progressed German media increasingly highlighted his performances to suggest he should be called up to the Germany national team. When his full potential was finally unveiled, he had already decided to represent Germany. At the end of the season Köln were relegated, but Podolski impressed so much, that he held his debut for Rudi Völler's Germany on 6 June 2004, at age 19, in Kaiserslautern against Hungary with a late substitute appearance. He had become the first second-division player since 1975 to break into the national team.

=== Euro 2004 ===
Podolski played for Germany at Euro 2004, where he was the squad's youngest player. He made one substitute appearance in the game against the Czech Republic, when he came on for Torsten Frings at half-time.

=== 2006 World Cup ===
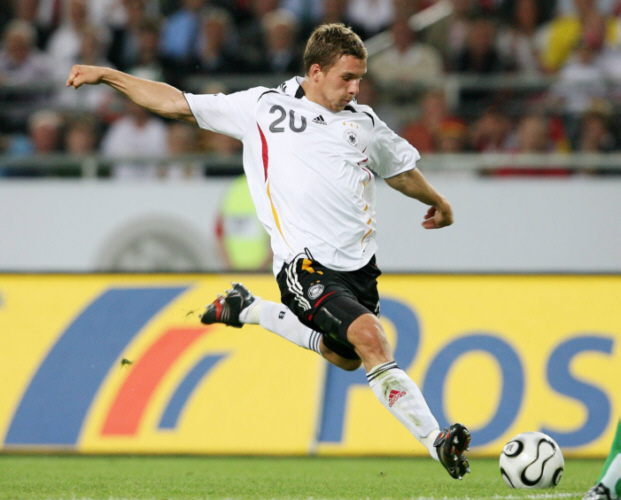
Podolski playing for Germany in 2006

Podolski was selected in the Germany squad for the 2006 World Cup, where he partnered Miroslav Klose as the attack duo in the starting lineup. He scored his first World Cup goal in Germany's third group match against Ecuador, and both goals in the 2–0 win over Sweden in the round of 16. He became the first player since 1962 to score two goals in the first 12 minutes of a World Cup match and only the third player ever to accomplish the feat. Germany finished third in the tournament, and while his teammate Miroslav Klose won the Golden Boot competition, Podolski's three goals tied him for second place with Ronaldo, Thierry Henry, Fernando Torres, David Villa, Maxi Rodríguez, Hernán Crespo and Zinedine Zidane. Podolski was named the World Cup's Best Young Player ahead of players like Lionel Messi and Cristiano Ronaldo.

=== UEFA Euro 2008 ===
In a UEFA Euro 2008 qualifying game against San Marino in Serravalle Podolski netted four goals in Germany's record 13–0 thrashing. He is one of only four German players to score four goals in an international match. He was the third after Gerd Müller and Michael Ballack, and since this, Mario Gómez has accomplished this feat. In Germany's 4–1 win against Slovakia in Bratislava on 11 October 2006, he scored the first and the last German goal, both on assists by Miroslav Klose. He has continued to score goals at an astonishing rate. On 17 November 2007, in a Euro qualifier match against Cyprus, Podolski was involved in every goal in Germany's 4–0 victory. This was one of Podolski's best performances for the national team. Even though he played out of his natural position, playing at left midfield, he netted one goal himself and was voted Man of the Match.

On 8 June 2008, Podolski made his Euro 2008 entrance against debutants Poland in a Group B match in Klagenfurt, Austria. He scored both goals in a 2–0 victory. He avoided celebrating his goals, however, to show respect for his country of birth. After the game he gave an emotional interview on Polish television. The goals put him in the lead in the Euro 2008 goal-scoring list for two days until David Villa scored a hat-trick for Spain against Russia.

On 12 June, Germany played Croatia in their second Group B match, again in Klagenfurt. Podolski scored the German team's only goal of the game in the 79th minute, by which time the Croatians were already leading 2–0. He did not celebrate this goal either despite it putting him joint first on the Euro 2008 goal-scoring list with David Villa. Podolski's goal was not enough to snatch a draw, with Croatia holding out for a 2–1 victory over Germany. On 19 June, Germany played Portugal in the quarterfinal in Basel, Podolski was instrumental in the first goal, whipping a cross into the penalty box that was slotted home by Bastian Schweinsteiger in the 22nd minute to give Germany a 1–0 lead.

On the international scene, Podolski seemed to be gravitating towards an attacking left midfield role from his traditional place as a striker. Initially, Löw had moved him to the wing in order to accommodate the partnership of Klose and Mario Gómez up front. When this backfired, he resumed his forward position in the UEFA Euro 2008 Final, but was unable to prevent Germany losing 1–0 to Spain. In a controversial incident, Podolski was headbutted by Spanish midfielder David Silva, although this went unnoticed by the referee and his assistants, and went unpenalised. Podolski was named in the 23-man squad as one of the players of the tournament along with countrymen Michael Ballack and Philipp Lahm.

=== 2010 World Cup ===
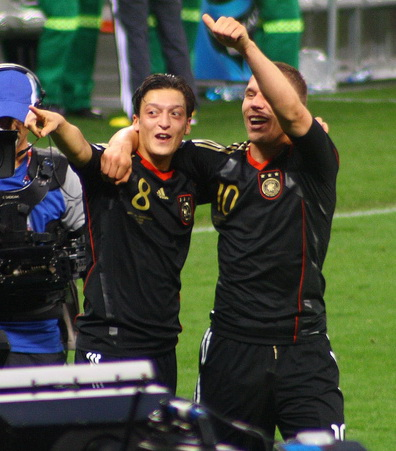
Podolski (right) celebrating with Mesut Özil after Germany's win against Argentina at the 2010 World Cup

On 6 September 2008, Podolski scored the opening two goals in Germany's first 2010 World Cup qualifier against Liechtenstein in Vaduz; a match that ended in a 6–0 victory for the Germans. He scored the opener in the 2–1 home win over Russia on 11 October, when he turned Vasili Berezutski on the edge of the penalty area, before unleashing a powerful shot past Russia's goalkeeper Akinfeev. He finished the qualification campaign second highest scorer of Group 4 with six goals, behind teammate Miroslav Klose's 7. During one of the qualifying matches, he was involved in a bust-up with team captain Michael Ballack.

On 13 June 2010, Podolski, who had become accustomed to his position as a winger scored the first goal in Germany's World Cup opening game in a 4–0 win against Australia, before assisting teammate Thomas Müller for the third goal. On 18 June, Podolski missed a second-half penalty after a handling infraction committed by Nemanja Vidić in the 1–0 loss to Serbia. The German team had gone down to 10-men after a second yellow was shown to Miroslav Klose in the 36th minute. Even though the Germans played with 10-men throughout the rest of the game, Podolski had numerous chances on goal. However, he was unable to capitalize, and the game ended in a surprise defeat for the Germans. However, he managed to score against England in the last 16, giving Germany a 2–0 advantage in the first half. They went on to beat England 4–1. In the quarter-final against Argentina, Podolski provided the assist for the first of Klose's two goals, bringing the score to 2–0. The Germans won the match 4–0.

=== Euro 2012 ===
During qualification, Podolski provided assists for three goals and scored three times, helping Germany to win all ten matches of their qualification campaign. During Euro 2012, Podolski started all three of Germany's Group B games, the third being his 100th appearance for Germany; a game in which he also scored. Podolski's last game at Euro 2012 was the successful Italy national team in the semi-finals against Germany, 2–1.

=== Record goal and 2014 World Cup ===
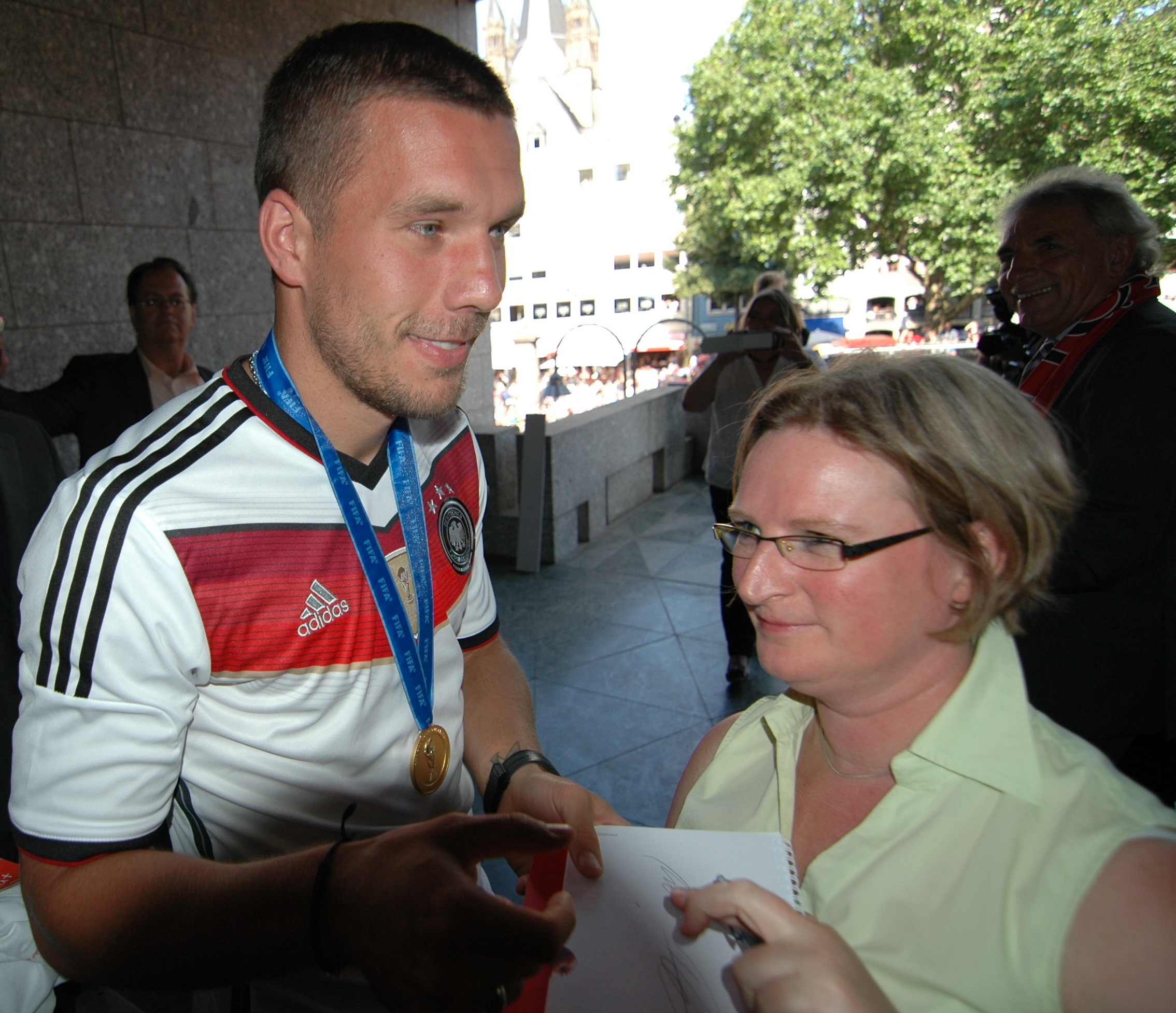
Podolski after winning the 2014 World Cup

On 29 May 2013, Podolski broke the previous record for the fastest international goal in German history, scoring after 8 seconds into the match in a 4–2 away win against Ecuador. This record was broken eleven years later by Florian Wirtz, who scored in 7 seconds against France.

Podolski was part of Germany's 2014 World Cup campaign. Prior to the tournament, he played in five qualification matches. In the World Cup finals in Brazil, he appeared in the victories over USA and Portugal in the group stages, but did not play the full 90 minutes. Germany went on to become World Champions.

=== Euro 2016 and retirement ===
Podolski was included in the squad for UEFA Euro 2016. He made a substitute appearance against Slovakia during the tournament. After the tournament, on 15 August, he announced his retirement from international football (effective 23 March 2017) saying he wants to shift his focus and spend more time with his family. He was given his last ever international appearance for Germany against England on 22 March 2017, where he scored the winning goal from long range.

== Style of play ==
Podolski possesses an explosive and accurate shot. Arsene Wenger described Podolski saying "He's certainly one of the best finishers I've ever seen...If there's one you want to see in front of the goal in a shooting position, it's him". In his early years, Podolski possessed explosive speed with great acceleration which was later affected by some lengthy injuries. He usually cuts inside either to shoot or pass the ball. Podolski is a physically strong player able to hold up the ball and produce key passes. Podolski has good dribbling and technical skills and is also a good crosser of the ball having set up many goals for his teammates from the left side. He is a penalty specialist, having missed only two penalties in his career.

== Career statistics ==
=== Club ===
Appearances and goals by club, season and competition
Club	Season	League			National cup (Note: Includes FA Cup, DFB-Pokal, Coppa Italia, Turkish Cup, Emperor's Cup and Polish Cup)		League cup (Note: Includes EFL Cup, DFL-Ligapokal and J.League Cup)		Continental		Other		Total	
Club	Season	Division	Apps	Goals	Apps	Goals	Apps	Goals	Apps	Goals	Apps	Goals	Apps	Goals
1. FC Köln II	2002–03	Regionalliga Nord	1	0	—		—		—		—		1	0
1. FC Köln II	2003–04	Regionalliga Nord	1	0	—		—		—		—		1	0
1. FC Köln II	Total		2	0	—		—		—		—		2	0
1. FC Köln	2003–04	Bundesliga	19	10	1	0	—		—		—		20	10
1. FC Köln	2004–05	2. Bundesliga	30	24	2	5	—		—		—		32	29
1. FC Köln	2005–06	Bundesliga	32	12	1	0	—		—		—		33	12
1. FC Köln	Total		81	46	4	5	—		—		—		85	51
Bayern Munich	2006–07	Bundesliga	22	4	3	2	2	0	7 (Note: Appearances in UEFA Champions League)	1	—		34	7
Bayern Munich	2007–08	Bundesliga	25	5	4	0	0	0	12 (Note: Appearances in UEFA Cup)	5	—		41	10
Bayern Munich	2008–09	Bundesliga	24	6	3	1	—		4	2	—		31	9
Bayern Munich	Total		71	15	10	3	2	0	23	8	—		106	26
Bayern Munich II	2007–08	Regionalliga Süd	2	0	—		—		—		—		2	0
1. FC Köln	2009–10	Bundesliga	27	2	4	1	—		—		—		31	3
1. FC Köln	2010–11	Bundesliga	32	13	2	1	—		—		—		34	14
1. FC Köln	2011–12	Bundesliga	29	18	2	0	—		—		—		31	18
1. FC Köln	Total		88	33	8	2	—		—		—		96	35
Arsenal	2012–13	Premier League	33	11	2	1	1	0	6	4	—		42	16
Arsenal	2013–14	Premier League	20	8	4	3	0	0	3	1	—		27	12
Arsenal	2014–15	Premier League	7	0	0	0	1	0	5	3	—		13	3
Arsenal	Total		60	19	6	4	2	0	14	8	—		82	31
Inter Milan (loan)	2014–15	Serie A	17	1	1	0	—		—		—		18	1
Galatasaray	2015–16	Süper Lig	30	13	4	2	—		8 (Note: Six appearances and two goals in UEFA Champions League, two appearances in UEFA Europa League)	2	1 (Note: Appearance in Turkish Super Cup)	0	43	17
Galatasaray	2016–17	Süper Lig	26	7	5	10	—		—		1	0	32	17
Galatasaray	Total		56	20	9	12	—		8	2	2	0	75	34
Vissel Kobe	2017	J1 League	15	5	1	0	2	0	—		—		18	5
Vissel Kobe	2018	J1 League	24	5	1	0	1	2	—		—		26	7
Vissel Kobe	2019	J1 League	13	5	3	0	0	0	—		—		16	5
Vissel Kobe	Total		52	15	5	0	3	2	—		—		60	17
Antalyaspor	2019–20	Süper Lig	9	2	2	0	—		—		—		11	2
Antalyaspor	2020–21	Süper Lig	31	4	5	1	—		—		—		36	5
Antalyaspor	Total		40	6	7	1	—		—		—		47	7
Górnik Zabrze	2021–22	Ekstraklasa	27	9	3	0	—		—		—		30	9
Górnik Zabrze	2022–23	Ekstraklasa	29	6	2	2	—		—		—		31	8
Górnik Zabrze	2023–24	Ekstraklasa	25	3	2	0	—		—		—		27	3
Górnik Zabrze	2024–25	Ekstraklasa	28	5	1	0	—		—		—		29	5
Górnik Zabrze	2025–26	Ekstraklasa	16	0	2	0	—		—		—		18	0
Górnik Zabrze	Total		125	23	10	2	—		—		—		135	25
Career total			594	178	60	29	7	2	45	18	2	0	708	227

=== International ===
Appearances and goals by national team and year
National team	Year	Apps	Goals
Germany	2004	8	2
Germany	2005	12	8
Germany	2006	17	12
Germany	2007	7	2
Germany	2008	16	7
Germany	2009	9	6
Germany	2010	14	5
Germany	2011	12	1
Germany	2012	11	1
Germany	2013	5	2
Germany	2014	10	1
Germany	2015	5	1
Germany	2016	3	0
Germany	2017	1	1
Total		130	49

Germany score listed first, score column indicates score after each Podolski goal.

List of international goals scored by Lukas Podolski
No.	Date	Venue	Opponent	Score	Result	Competition	Ref.
1	21 December 2004	Rajamangala Stadium, Bangkok, Thailand	Thailand	3–1	5–1	Friendly	
2	21 December 2004	Rajamangala Stadium, Bangkok, Thailand	Thailand	5–1	5–1	Friendly	
3	26 March 2005	Stadion Z'dežele, Celje, Slovenia	Slovenia	1–0	1–0	Friendly	
4	4 June 2005	Windsor Park, Belfast, Northern Ireland	Northern Ireland	4–1	4–1	Friendly	
5	15 June 2005	Waldstadion, Frankfurt, Germany	Australia	4–2	4–3	2005 FIFA Confederations Cup	
6	25 June 2005	Frankenstadion, Nuremberg, Germany	Brazil	1–1	2–3	2005 FIFA Confederations Cup	
7	29 June 2005	Zentralstadion, Leipzig, Germany	Mexico	1–0	4–3	2005 FIFA Confederations Cup	
8	7 September 2005	Weserstadion, Bremen, Germany	South Africa	1–0	4–2	Friendly	
9	7 September 2005	Weserstadion, Bremen, Germany	South Africa	3–1	4–2	Friendly	
10	7 September 2005	Weserstadion, Bremen, Germany	South Africa	4–2	4–2	Friendly	
11	27 May 2006	Badenova-Stadion, Freiburg, Germany	Luxembourg	3–0	7–0	Friendly	
12	27 May 2006	Badenova-Stadion, Freiburg, Germany	Luxembourg	5–0	7–0	Friendly	
13	20 June 2006	Olympiastadion, Berlin, Germany	Ecuador	3–0	3–0	2006 FIFA World Cup	
14	24 June 2006	Allianz Arena, Munich, Germany	Sweden	1–0	2–0	2006 FIFA World Cup	
15	24 June 2006	Allianz Arena, Munich, Germany	Sweden	2–0	2–0	2006 FIFA World Cup	
16	2 September 2006	Gottlieb-Daimler-Stadion, Stuttgart, Germany	Republic of Ireland	1–0	1–0	UEFA Euro 2008 qualifying	
17	6 September 2006	San Marino Stadium, Serravalle, San Marino	San Marino	1–0	13–0	UEFA Euro 2008 qualifying	
18	6 September 2006	San Marino Stadium, Serravalle, San Marino	San Marino	5–0	13–0	UEFA Euro 2008 qualifying	
19	6 September 2006	San Marino Stadium, Serravalle, San Marino	San Marino	8–0	13–0	UEFA Euro 2008 qualifying	
20	6 September 2006	San Marino Stadium, Serravalle, San Marino	San Marino	10–0	13–0	UEFA Euro 2008 qualifying	
21	11 October 2006	Tehelné pole, Bratislava, Slovakia	Slovakia	1–0	4–1	UEFA Euro 2008 qualifying	
22	11 October 2006	Tehelné pole, Bratislava, Slovakia	Slovakia	4–1	4–1	UEFA Euro 2008 qualifying	
23	12 September 2007	RheinEnergieStadion, Cologne, Germany	Romania	3–1	3–1	Friendly	
24	17 November 2007	AWD-Arena, Hanover, Germany	Cyprus	3–0	4–0	UEFA Euro 2008 qualifying	
25	26 March 2008	St. Jakob-Park, Basel, Switzerland	Switzerland	4–0	4–0	Friendly	
26	8 June 2008	Wörthersee Stadion, Klagenfurt, Austria	Poland	1–0	2–0	UEFA Euro 2008	
27	8 June 2008	Wörthersee Stadion, Klagenfurt, Austria	Poland	2–0	2–0	UEFA Euro 2008	
28	12 June 2008	Wörthersee Stadion, Klagenfurt, Austria	Croatia	1–2	1–2	UEFA Euro 2008	
29	6 September 2008	Rheinpark Stadion, Vaduz, Liechtenstein	Liechtenstein	1–0	6–0	2010 FIFA World Cup qualification	
30	6 September 2008	Rheinpark Stadion, Vaduz, Liechtenstein	Liechtenstein	2–0	6–0	2010 FIFA World Cup qualification	
31	11 October 2008	Signal Iduna Park, Dortmund, Germany	Russia	1–0	2–1	2010 FIFA World Cup qualification	
32	28 March 2009	Zentralstadion, Leipzig, Germany	Liechtenstein	4–0	4–0	2010 FIFA World Cup qualification	
33	29 May 2009	Shanghai Stadium, Shanghai, China	China	1–1	1–1	Friendly	
34	9 September 2009	AWD-Arena, Hanover, Germany	Azerbaijan	4–0	4–0	2010 FIFA World Cup qualification	
35	14 October 2009	HSH Nordbank Arena, Hamburg, Germany	Finland	1–1	1–1	2010 FIFA World Cup qualification	
36	18 November 2009	Veltins-Arena, Gelsenkirchen, Germany	Ivory Coast	1–0	2–2	Friendly	
37	18 November 2009	Veltins-Arena, Gelsenkirchen, Germany	Ivory Coast	2–2	2–2	Friendly	
38	29 May 2010	Ferenc Puskás Stadium, Budapest, Hungary	Hungary	1–0	3–0	Friendly	
39	13 June 2010	Moses Mabhida Stadium, Durban, South Africa	Australia	1–0	4–0	2010 FIFA World Cup	
40	27 June 2010	Free State Stadium, Bloemfontein, South Africa	England	2–0	4–1	2010 FIFA World Cup	
41	7 September 2010	Red Bull Arena, Salzburg, Austria	Azerbaijan	2–0	6–1	UEFA Euro 2012 qualifying	
42	12 October 2010	Astana Arena, Astana, Kazakhstan	Kazakhstan	3–0	3–0	UEFA Euro 2012 qualifying	
43	2 September 2011	Veltins-Arena, Gelsenkirchen, Germany	Austria	3–0	6–2	UEFA Euro 2012 qualifying	
44	17 June 2012	Arena Lviv, Lviv, Ukraine	Denmark	1–0	2–1	UEFA Euro 2012	
45	29 May 2013	FAU Stadium, Boca Raton, United States	Ecuador	1–0	4–2	Friendly	
46	29 May 2013	FAU Stadium, Boca Raton, United States	Ecuador	3–0	4–2	Friendly	
47	6 June 2014	Mewa Arena, Mainz, Germany	Armenia	2–1	6–1	Friendly	
48	25 March 2015	Fritz-Walter-Stadion, Kaiserslautern, Germany	Australia	2–2	2–2	Friendly	
49	22 March 2017	Signal Iduna Park, Dortmund, Germany	England	1–0	1–0	Friendly	

== Charity and philanthropy ==
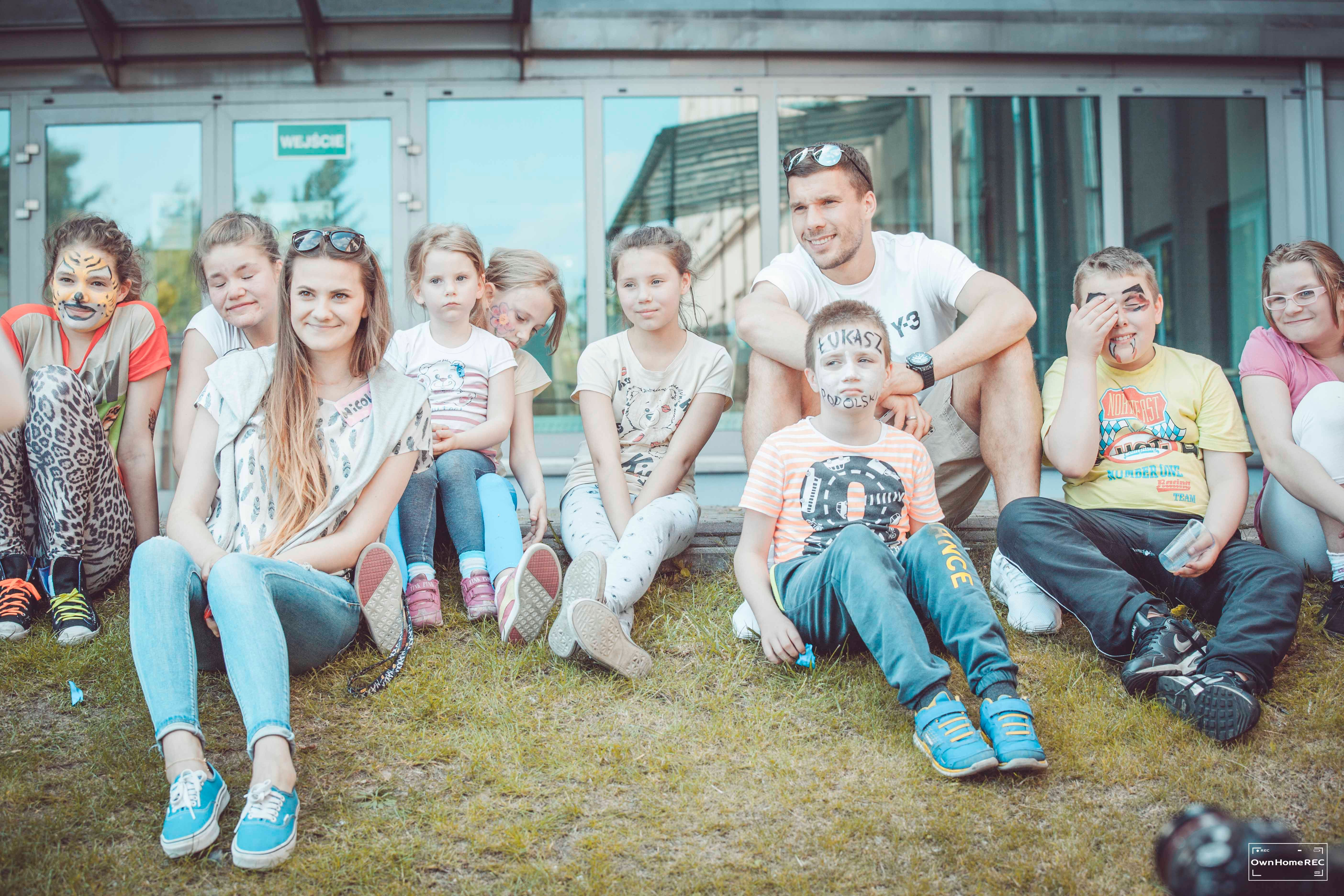
Podolski with children from Arka Fundacja Dzieci in Warsaw, June 2015

Podolski is the founder of the Lukas Podolski Foundation for Sport and Education (Lukas Podolski Stiftung für Sport und Bildung), whose objectives are to provide opportunities for socially disadvantaged children and youth, combat child poverty, and advance social inclusion, integration, and international understanding.

He is also an ambassador of the Christian Children's Fund the Ark (Die Arche). One of his projects is a community day care centre for children located in a distressed part of Praga-Północ district in Warsaw, Poland, opened in 2014. The facility is run by Arka Fundacja Dzieci sponsored by Podolski's foundation.

== Personal life ==
Podolski was born to Waldemar Podolski and Krystyna Podolska in the Silesian industrial city of Gliwice near Katowice in Poland. Waldemar is a former footballer who played in Poland and Germany. Krystyna is a former member of the Poland national handball team.

In 1987, when Podolski was two years old, his family emigrated from Poland to West Germany and were given Aussiedler status as a result of his paternal grandparents having German citizenship prior to World War II (Gliwice was a part of Germany until 1945 as Gleiwitz). Podolski grew up in Bergheim, North Rhine-Westphalia, and later in Pulheim, both near Cologne.

Podolski previously possessed dual German and Polish citizenship but has stated that he relinquished his Polish passport. In an interview Podolski said that the Polish Football Association never cared about him until he started playing for the German under-21 team and received coverage in the media. At that point, Podolski had already decided to play for Germany, but nevertheless "there are two hearts beating" in his chest. Podolski speaks German, Polish, and English, and sometimes communicated with Bayern Munich and Germany strike partner Miroslav Klose, also a Polish-born Aussiedler, in Polish to hinder their opposition's understanding of their conversation. Podolski is a fan of KS Górnik Zabrze, a football team based 3 kilometres (1.9 mi) from his place of birth.

In April 2011, Podolski married his longtime girlfriend Monika Puchalska in Cologne, Germany. They had a church wedding in Kamionna, Węgrów County, Poland in June 2011. They have a son born 14 April 2008, a daughter, born 6 June 2016, and a third child. They currently reside in Katowice, Poland, where Podolski owns an apartment in the Pierwsza Dzielnica neighborhood.

Podolski owns an ice cream parlour and a kebab shop in Cologne.

On 30 June 2021, Podolski was announced as a judge for the 15th season of Das Supertalent, the German version of Got Talent. He became the first association football player to judge any version of the franchise owned by Simon Cowell.

Podolski has brand partnerships with NAVEE as their brand ambassador for Poland, Crocs for their "Play Hard. Rest Easy." football campaign, and Mega Casino World as their regional brand ambassador across Asia.

== Honours ==
1. FC Köln

- 2. Bundesliga: 2004–05

Bayern Munich

- Bundesliga: 2007–08
- DFB-Pokal: 2007–08

Arsenal

- FA Cup: 2013–14

Galatasaray

- Turkish Cup: 2015–16
- Turkish Super Cup: 2015, 2016

Vissel Kobe

- Emperor's Cup: 2019

Górnik Zabrze

- Polish Cup: 2025–26

Germany

- FIFA World Cup: 2014; third place: 2006, 2010
- UEFA European Championship: runner-up 2008
- FIFA Confederations Cup third place: 2005

Individual

- 2.Bundesliga Top scorer: 2004–05
- FIFA World Cup Best Young Player: 2006
- Silver Shoe: Euro 2008
- UEFA Euro Team of the Tournament: 2008
- kicker Bundesliga Team of the Season: 2010–11
- Goal of the Year (Germany): 2017
- Ekstraklasa Top assists provider: 2022–23

Orders

- Silbernes Lorbeerblatt: 2006, 2010, 2014

== See also ==
- List of men's footballers with 100 or more international caps
- List of FIFA World Cup top goalscorers
