= Dariusz Podolski =

Polish footballer

Personal information
- Date of birth: 17 June 1966 (age 60)
- Place of birth: Łódź, Poland
- Height: 1.82 m (6 ft 0 in)
- Position: Midfielder

Senior career*
Years	Team	Apps	(Gls)
1985–1986	Pilica Tomaszów Mazowiecki		
1986–1987	ŁKS Łódź	14	(0)
1988–1989	Zawisza Bydgoszcz		
1989–1994	ŁKS Łódź	138	(31)
1994–1996	Widzew Łódź	45	(7)
1996–1998	Petrochemia Płock		
1999–2000	Ceramika Opoczno		
2000	Hapoel Beit She'an		
2000–2001	Ceramika Opoczno		
2001–2002	Świt Nowy Dwór		
2002–2003	Unia Skierniewice		
2003–2004	Tur Turek		
2004–2005	Bzura Ozorków		
2005	KS Częstochowa		
2007	MGKS Lubraniec		
- * Club domestic league appearances and goals

Dariusz Podolski (born 17 June 1966) is a Polish former professional football who played as a midfielder.
