= Waldemar Podolski =

Polish footballer

Personal information
- Date of birth: 5 April 1955 (age 71)
- Place of birth: Poland
- Height: 1.84 m (6 ft 0 in)
- Position: Forward

Youth career
- Sośnica Gliwice

Senior career*
Years	Team	Apps	(Gls)
–1978	Walka Makoszowy		
1978–1979	Szombierki Bytom	4	(0)
1979–1982	ROW 1964 Rybnik		
1982–1987	Górnik Knurów		
- * Club domestic league appearances and goals

Waldemar Podolski (born 4 April 1955) is a Polish former footballer who played as a forward.

Podolski played for two years in the Polish highest division and twelve years in the second division. One of the teams he played for would go to camps three times a year, where they would hike in the snow and never see a football.

He is the father of Poland-born German former international Lukas Podolski.
