= Sophie Podolski =

Belgian poet and graphic artist (1953–1974)

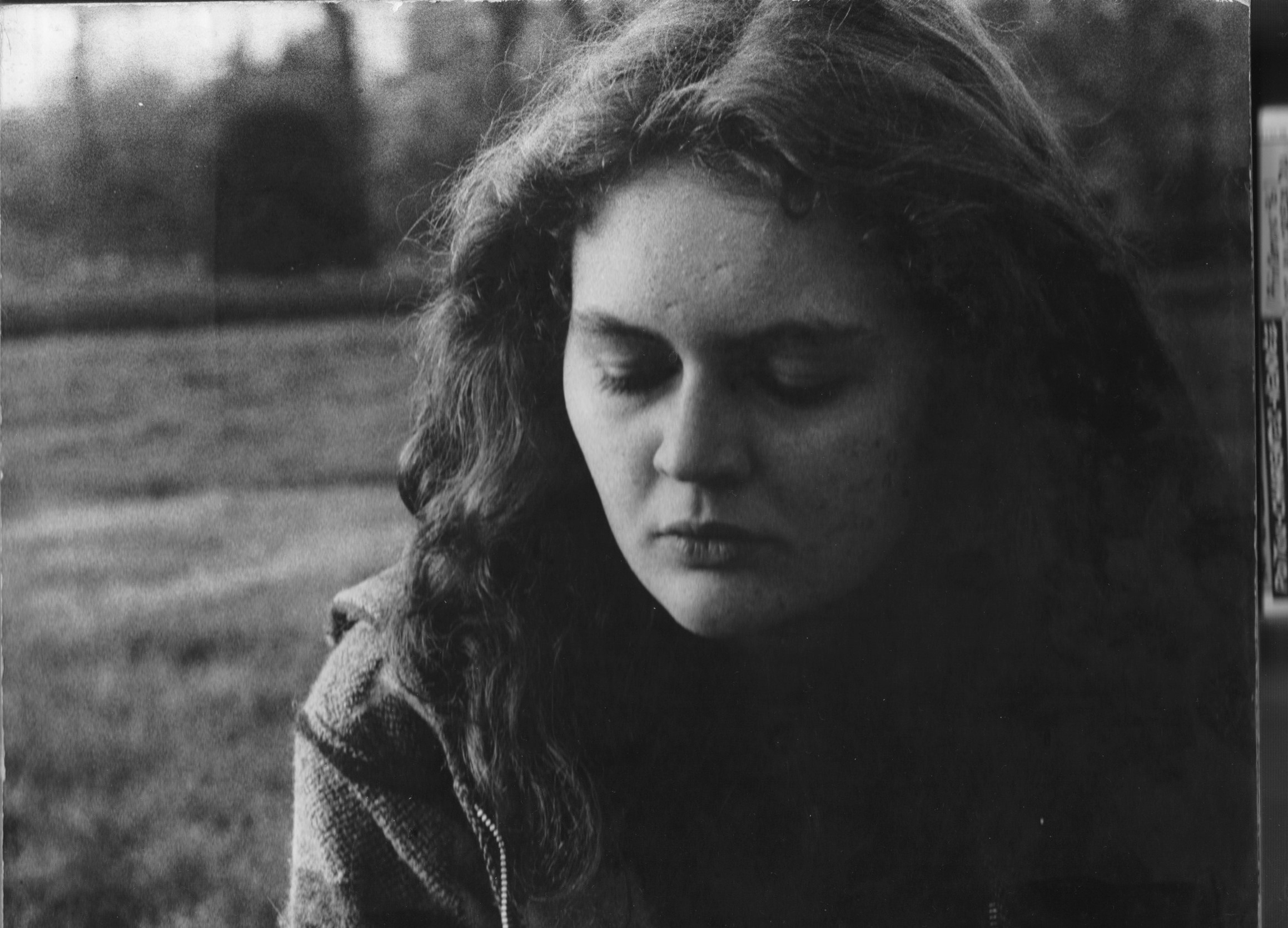
- Born: 8 October 1953; Brussels, Belgium
- Died: 29 December 1974 (aged 21); Brussels, Belgium
- Occupations: Poet and graphic artist
- Known for: The book Le pays où tout est permis (1972)

Sophie Podolski (8 October 1953 – 29 December 1974) was a Belgian poet and graphic artist. She published only one book during her lifetime, Le pays où tout est permis (1972; The Country Where Everything Is Allowed), in which the poems were reproduced in her own artistic handwriting for its original 1972 edition (a censored, typeset edition followed in 1973).

== Biography ==
Sophie Podolski studied etching at the Académie de Boitsfort and was associated with the artistic community at Montfaucon Research Center.

Podolski had schizophrenia and spent time in psychiatric clinics in Paris and Brussels. She attempted suicide in Brussels on 19 December 1974 and died 10 days later as a result. The method is not disclosed in articles about her.

Podolski left a number of unpublished poems and graphic artworks which were posthumously published by Marc Dachy. Her work entitled Sophie Podolski Snow Queen was published as a special issue (no. 6, 1980) of the literary magazine Luna Park.

Her poetry was much admired by the novelist and poet Roberto Bolaño, who referenced Podolski in his novels The Savage Detectives, Antwerp, and Distant Star, and in his short stories "Vagabond in France and Belgium" and "Dance Card" (both collected in Last Evenings on Earth).
