= Akyar, Khaybullinsky District, Republic of Bashkortostan =

Akyar Акъяр
- Selo

Other transcription(s)
  - Bashkir: Аҡъяр
- Interactive map of Akyar
- Location of Akyar Akyar (Bashkortostan)
- Coordinates: 51°51′49″N 58°12′38″E
- Country: Russia
- Federal subject: Bashkortostan
- Administrative district: Khaybullinsky District
- SelsovietSelsoviet: Akyarsky
- Founded: 1843
- Elevation: 330 m (1,080 ft)

Population (2010 Census)
  - Total: 6,941
  - Estimate (2010): 6,941 (0%)

Administrative status
  - Capital of: Khaybullinsky District, Akyarsky Selsoviet

Municipal status
  - Municipal district: Khaybullinsky Municipal District
  - Rural settlement: Akyarsky Selsoviet Rural Settlement
  - Capital of: Khaybullinsky Municipal District, Akyarsky Selsoviet Rural Settlement
- Time zone: UTC+5 (MSK+2)
- Postal code: 453800
- OKTMO ID: 80655415101

Akyar (Russian: Акъя́р, Bashkir: Аҡъяр, Aqyar) is a rural locality (a selo) and the administrative center of Khaybullinsky District of the Republic of Bashkortostan, Russia, located on the Tanalyk River. Population: 6,941 (2010 census); 5,549 (2002 census); 4,278 (1989 Soviet census).
