= Khaybullinsky District =

Khaybullinsky District Хайбуллинский район (Russian)
- District

Other transcription(s)
  - Bashkir: Хәйбулла районы
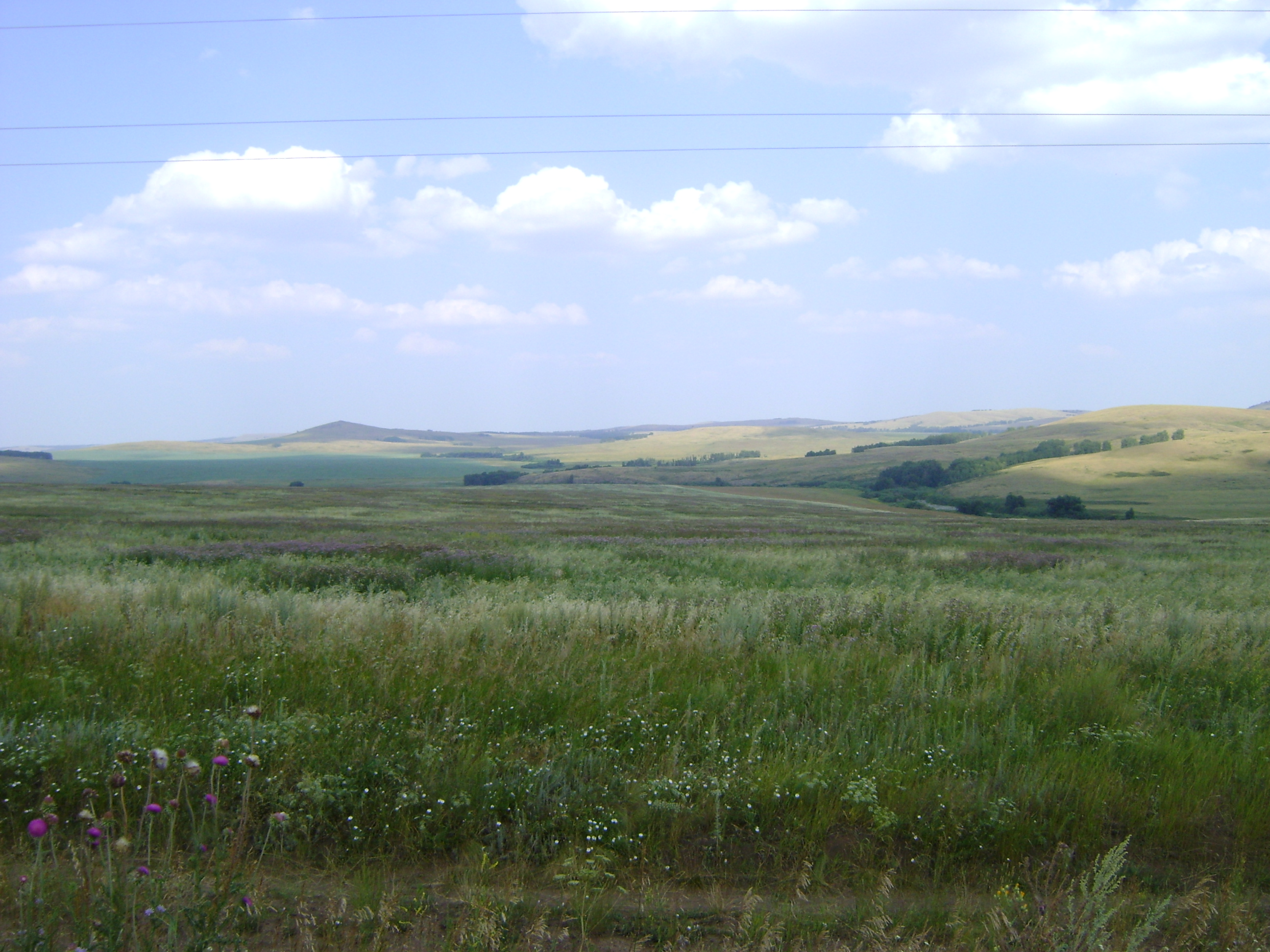
- View of Khaybullinsky District

- Flag Coat of arms
- Location of Khaybullinsky District in the Republic of Bashkortostan
- Coordinates: 51°52′N 58°13′E
- Country: Russia
- Federal subject: Republic of Bashkortostan
- Established: August 20, 1930
- Administrative center: Akyar

Area
  - Total: 3,912 km^{2} (1,510 sq mi)

Population (2010 Census)
  - Total: 33,398
  - Estimate (2018): 30,791 (−7.8%)
  - Density: 8.537/km^{2} (22.11/sq mi)
  - Urban: 0%
  - Rural: 100%

Administrative structure
  - Administrative divisions: 14 Selsoviets
  - Inhabited localities: 57 rural localities

Municipal structure
  - Municipally incorporated as: Khaybullinsky Municipal District
  - Municipal divisions: 0 urban settlements, 14 rural settlements
- Time zone: UTC+5 (MSK+2)
- OKTMO ID: 80655000
- Website: https://haibulla.bashkortostan.ru/

Population of Khaybullinsky District
- 2010 Census: 33,398
- 2002 Census: 33,072
- 1989 Census: 29,924
- 1979 Census: 30,571

Khaybullinsky District (Russian: Хайбулли́нский райо́н; Bashkir: Хәйбулла районы, Xäybulla rayonı) is an administrative and municipal district (raion), one of the fifty-four in the Republic of Bashkortostan, Russia. It is located in the south of the republic and borders with Zilairsky and Baymaksky Districts in the north, Orenburg Oblast in the east and south, and with Zianchurinsky District in the west. The area of the district is 3,912 square kilometers (1,510 sq mi). Its administrative center is the rural locality (a selo) of Akyar. As of the 2010 Census, the total population of the district was 33,398, with the population of Akyar accounting for 20.8% of that number.

== Geography ==
The Tanalyk, Sakmara, and Bolshaya Urtazymka Rivers flow through the district's territory.

== History ==
The district was established on August 20, 1930. It is named after its administrative center, which was previously known as Khaybullino.

== Administrative and municipal status ==
Within the framework of administrative divisions, Khaybullinsky District is one of the fifty-four in the Republic of Bashkortostan. The district is divided into fourteen selsoviets, comprising fifty-seven rural localities. As a municipal division, the district is incorporated as Khaybullinsky Municipal District. Its fourteen selsoviets are incorporated as fourteen rural settlements within the municipal district. The selo of Akyar serves as the administrative center of both the administrative and municipal district.

== Economy ==
The economy of the district is agricultural in nature, although there are also copper- and gold-mining operations.

== Towns and settlements ==
- Abdulnasyrovo
