= 2023 Shimizu S-Pulse season =

Association football season

Shimizu S-Pulse
2023 season
- Chairman: Shigeo Hidaritomo
- Manager: Tadahiro Akiba
- Stadium: IAI Stadium Nihondaira
- J2 League: 5th
- Emperor's Cup: Second round
- J.League Cup: Group stage
- Biggest win: 9–1 vs Iwaki FC (7 May; J1 League)
- Biggest defeat: 0–6 vs Kawasaki Frontale (19 April; J.League Cup)
- All statistics correct as of 13 May 2023.

The 2023 season was Shimizu S-Pulse's 32nd season in existence and the club's first season back in the second division of Japanese football since 2016. In addition to the domestic league, Shimizu S-Pulse participated in this season's edition of the Emperor's Cup and the J.League Cup.

== Players ==
=== First-team squad ===
As of 12 May 2023.

Note: Flags indicate national team as defined under FIFA eligibility rules; some limited exceptions apply. Players may hold more than one non-FIFA nationality.

| No. | Pos. | Nation | Player |
|---|---|---|---|
| 1 | GK | JPN | Takuo Ōkubo |
| 2 | DF | JPN | Reon Yamahara |
| 3 | MF | BRA | Ronaldo |
| 4 | DF | JPN | Yuji Takahashi |
| 5 | DF | JPN | Kengo Kitazume |
| 6 | MF | JPN | Ryo Takeuchi |
| 7 | MF | JPN | Yuta Kamiya |
| 9 | FW | BRA | Thiago Santana |
| 10 | FW | BRA | Carlinhos Júnior |
| 11 | MF | JPN | Katsuhiro Nakayama |
| 13 | MF | JPN | Kota Miyamoto |
| 14 | FW | JPN | Ryohei Shirasaki |
| 15 | MF | JPN | Takeru Kishimoto |
| 16 | MF | JPN | Kenta Nishizawa |
| 17 | MF | KOS | Benjamin Kololli |
| 18 | FW | JPN | Sena Saito |
| 20 | FW | KOR | Oh Se-hun |
| 22 | MF | BRA | Renato Augusto |
| 24 | DF | JPN | Shuta Kikuchi |
| 27 | DF | JPN | Takumu Kenmotsu |
| 28 | DF | JPN | Yutaka Yoshida |

| No. | Pos. | Nation | Player |
|---|---|---|---|
| 29 | FW | JPN | Akira Silvano Disaro |
| 31 | GK | JPN | Togo Umeda |
| 33 | MF | JPN | Takashi Inui |
| 34 | DF | JPN | Taketo Ochiai |
| 35 | DF | JPN | Sen Takagi ^{DSP} |
| 37 | FW | JPN | Yosuke Morishige |
| 38 | DF | JPN | Akira Ibayashi |
| 40 | MF | JPN | Hikaru Naruoka |
| 41 | GK | JPN | Kaito Shibasaki ^{Type 2} |
| 42 | MF | JPN | Narumi Ota ^{Type 2} |
| 43 | MF | JPN | Naru Hoshito ^{Type 2} |
| 44 | FW | JPN | Jigen Tanaka ^{Type 2} |
| 45 | FW | JPN | Koya Kitagawa |
| 46 | GK | JPN | Ryoya Abe |
| 47 | MF | JPN | Ryunosuke Yada ^{Type 2} |
| 48 | MF | JPN | Sean Kotake ^{Type 2} |
| 49 | FW | JPN | Takumi Kato |
| 50 | DF | JPN | Yoshinori Suzuki (captain) |
| 51 | GK | JPN | Yui Inokoshi ^{DSP} |
| 52 | DF | JPN | Kaiga Iwazaki ^{Type 2} |
| 57 | GK | JPN | Shūichi Gonda |

=== Out on loan ===
Note: Flags indicate national team as defined under FIFA eligibility rules; some limited exceptions apply. Players may hold more than one non-FIFA nationality.

| No. | Pos. | Nation | Player |
|---|---|---|---|
| — | GK | JPN | Kengo Nagai (at Yokohama FC) |
| — | DF | BRA | Yago Pikachu (at Fortaleza EC) |
| — | MF | JPN | Teruki Hara (at Grasshoppers) |
| — | MF | JPN | Daiki Matsuoka (at Grêmio Novorizontino) |
| — | MF | JPN | Nagi Kawatani (at Fagiano Okayama) |
| — | MF | JPN | Yasufumi Nishimura (at Nagano Parceiro) |

| No. | Pos. | Nation | Player |
|---|---|---|---|
| — | FW | JPN | Yuito Suzuki (at RC Strasbourg) |
| — | FW | JPN | Aoi Ando (at Azul Claro Numazu) |
| — | FW | JPN | Kanta Chiba (at Tokushima Vortis) |
| — | FW | JPN | Riyo Kawamoto (at Thespakusatsu Gunma) |
| — | FW | JPN | Yuta Taki (at Matsumoto Yamaga) |

== Transfers ==
Transfers in
| Join on | Pos. | Player | Moving from | Transfer type |
|---|---|---|---|---|
| 7 Apr | DF | (Japan) Sen Takagi | (Japan) Hannan University | Loan transfer; DSP |
| Pre-season | GK | (Japan) Ryoya Abe | (Japan) Chuo Gakuin University | Free transfer |
| Pre-season | DF | (Japan) Kengo Kitazume | (Japan) Kashiwa Reysol | Full transfer |
| Pre-season | DF | (Japan) Yuji Takahashi | (Japan) Kashiwa Reysol | Full transfer |
| Pre-season | DF | (Japan) Yutaka Yoshida | (Japan) Nagoya Grampus | Full transfer |
| Pre-season | DF | (Japan) Taketo Ochiai | (Japan) Hosei University | Free transfer |
| Pre-season | DF | (Japan) Takumu Kenmotsu | (Japan) Waseda University | Free transfer |
| Pre-season | DF | (Japan) Shuta Kikuchi | (Japan) V-Varen Nagasaki | Loan return |
| Pre-season | MF | (Japan) Hikaru Naruoka | (Japan) Renofa Yamaguchi | Loan return |
| Pre-season | FW | (Japan) Yosuke Morishige | (Japan) Nihon Fujisawa HS | Free transfer |
| Pre-season | FW | (Japan) Sena Saito | (Japan) Ryutsu Keizai University | Free transfer |
| Pre-season | FW | (Japan) Akira Silvano Disaro | (Japan) Montedio Yamagata | Loan return |

Transfers out
| Leave on | Pos. | Player | Moving to | Transfer type |
|---|---|---|---|---|
| 19 Mar | MF | (Japan) Daiki Matsuoka | (Brazil) Grêmio Novorizontino | Loan transfer |
| Pre-season | GK | (Japan) Kengo Nagai | (Japan) Yokohama FC | Loan transfer |
| Pre-season | DF | (Japan) Eiichi Katayama | (Japan) Kashiwa Reysol | Full transfer |
| Pre-season | DF | (Japan) Yugo Tatsuta | (Japan) Kashiwa Reysol | Full transfer |
| Pre-season | DF | (Brazil) Valdo | (Japan) V-Varen Nagasaki | Full transfer |
| Pre-season | DF | (Brazil) Yago Pikachu | (Brazil) Fortaleza EC | Loan transfer |
| Pre-season | MF | (Japan) Daigo Takahashi | (Japan) Machida Zelvia | Full transfer |
| Pre-season | MF | (Japan) Teruki Hara | (Switzerland) Grasshoppers | Loan transfer |
| Pre-season | MF | (Japan) Nagi Kawatani | (Japan) Fagiano Okayama | Loan transfer |
| Pre-season | MF | (Japan) Yasufumi Nishimura | (Japan) Nagano Parceiro | Loan transfer |
| Pre-season | FW | (Japan) Yusuke Goto | (Japan) Montedio Yamagata | Free transfer |
| Pre-season | FW | (Japan) Ibrahim Junior Kuribara | (Japan) SC Sagamihara | Free transfer |
| Pre-season | FW | (Japan) Yuito Suzuki | (France) RC Strasbourg | Loan transfer |
| Pre-season | FW | (Japan) Kanta Chiba | (Japan) Tokushima Vortis | Loan transfer |
| Pre-season | FW | (Japan) Aoi Ando | (Japan) Azul Claro Numazu | Loan transfer |
| Pre-season | FW | (Japan) Yuta Taki | (Japan) Matsumoto Yamaga | Loan transfer |

== Competitions ==
=== Overview ===
| Competition | First match | Last match | Starting round | Record | | | | | | | |
| Competition | First match | Last match | Starting round | Pld | W | D | L | GF | GA | GD | Win % |
|---|---|---|---|---|---|---|---|---|---|---|---|
| J2 League | 18 February 2023 | 12 November 2023 | Matchday 1 | 15 | 6 | 7 | 2 | 33 | 11 | +22 | 40.00 |
| Emperor's Cup | 7 June 2023 | | Second round | 0 | 0 | 0 | 0 | 0 | 0 | +0 | — |
| J.League Cup | 8 March 2023 | | Group stage | 4 | 1 | 1 | 2 | 4 | 12 | −8 | 25.00 |
| Total | | | | 19 | 7 | 8 | 4 | 37 | 23 | +14 | 36.84 |

Last updated: 13 May 2023
Source: Soccerway

=== J2 League ===
==== League table ====
| Pos | Team | Pld | W | D | L | GF | GA | GD | Pts | Promotion or relegation |
|---|---|---|---|---|---|---|---|---|---|---|
| 2 | Júbilo Iwata (P) | 42 | 21 | 12 | 9 | 74 | 44 | +30 | 75 | Promotion to the J1 League |
| 3 | Tokyo Verdy (O, P) | 42 | 21 | 12 | 9 | 57 | 31 | +26 | 75 | Qualification for the promotion play-offs |
| 4 | Shimizu S-Pulse | 42 | 20 | 14 | 8 | 78 | 34 | +44 | 74 | Qualification for the promotion play-offs |
| 5 | Montedio Yamagata | 42 | 21 | 4 | 17 | 64 | 54 | +10 | 67 | Qualification for the promotion play-offs |
| 6 | JEF United Chiba | 42 | 19 | 10 | 13 | 61 | 53 | +8 | 67 | Qualification for the promotion play-offs |

Source: Meiji Yasuda J2 League, J.League Data Site
Rules for classification: 1) Points; 2) Goal difference; 3) Goals scored; 4) Head-to-head points; 5) Head-to-head goal difference; 6) Head-to-head goal scored; 7) Fair-play points.
(O) Play-off winners; (P) Promoted

==== Results summary ====
| Overall | | | | | | | | Home | | | | | | Away | | | | | |
| Pld | W | D | L | GF | GA | GD | Pts | W | D | L | GF | GA | GD | W | D | L | GF | GA | GD |
|---|---|---|---|---|---|---|---|---|---|---|---|---|---|---|---|---|---|---|---|
| 15 | 6 | 7 | 2 | 33 | 11 | +22 | 25 | 4 | 3 | 1 | 20 | 6 | +14 | 2 | 4 | 1 | 13 | 5 | +8 |

Last updated: 13 May 2023.
Source: Worldfootball

==== Results by round ====
| Round | 1 | 2 | 3 | 4 | 5 | 6 | 7 | 8 | 9 | 10 | 11 | 12 | 13 | 14 | 15 | 16 |
|---|---|---|---|---|---|---|---|---|---|---|---|---|---|---|---|---|
| Ground | H | A | A | H | A | H | A | H | H | A | A | H | A | H | H | A |
| Result | D | D | D | D | D | L | L | W | D | W | W | W | D | W | W | |
| Position | 10 | 13 | 14 | 14 | 14 | 18 | 19 | 16 | 17 | 14 | 10 | 8 | 8 | 7 | 5 | |

Updated to match(es) played on 13 May 2023. Source: Worldfootball
A = Away; H = Home; W = Win; D = Draw; L = Loss

==== Matches ====
The league fixtures were announced on 20 January 2023.

| 18 February 1 | Shimizu S-Pulse | 0–0 | Mito HollyHock | Shimizu |
| 14:00 | | Report | | Stadium: IAI Stadium Nihondaira; Attendance: 14,324; Referee: Kazuyoshi Enomoto |

| 26 February 2 | Fagiano Okayama | 0–0 | Shimizu S-Pulse | Okayama |
| 13:00 | | Report | | Stadium: City Light Stadium; Attendance: 15,695; Referee: Atsushi Kamimura |

| 4 March 3 | V-Varen Nagasaki | 1–1 | Shimizu S-Pulse | Isahaya |
| 14:00 | Kuwasaki 39' | Report | Disaro 90+4' | Stadium: Transcosmos Stadium Nagasaki; Attendance: 8,242; Referee: Yosuke Kubota |

| 12 March 4 | Shimizu S-Pulse | 0–0 | Oita Trinita | Shimizu |
| 14:00 | | Report | | Stadium: IAI Stadium Nihondaira; Attendance: 13,658; Referee: Keigo Sendachi |

| 18 March 5 | Júbilo Iwata | 2–2 | Shimizu S-Pulse | Fukuroi |
| 14:00 | Goto 2' (yellow card) 75'; Matsumoto 66' | Report | Thiago Santana 42', 87' (yellow card) 87'; Ronaldo (yellow card) 83'; Zé Ricardo (man.) (yellow card) 90+5' | Stadium: Ecopa Stadium; Attendance: 22,937; Referee: Hirokazu Otsubo |

| 29 March 6 | Shimizu S-Pulse | 1–3 | Thespakusatsu Gunma | Shimizu |
| 19:00 | Disaro 29' | Report | Hatao 25'; Sato 32'; Nagakura 53' | Stadium: IAI Stadium Nihondaira; Attendance: 8,482; Referee: Reo Tanaka |

| 1 April 7 | Ventforet Kofu | 1–0 | Shimizu S-Pulse | Kofu |
| 13:00 | Hasegawa 82' | Report | | Stadium: JIT Recycle Ink Stadium; Attendance: 11,643; Referee: Yuzo Sutani |

| 8 April 8 | Shimizu S-Pulse | 2–1 | Tokyo Verdy | Shimizu |
| 14:00 | Kitazume 45+2'; Oh Se-hun 90' | Report | Hayashi 6' | Stadium: IAI Stadium Nihondaira; Attendance: 10,418; Referee: Yoshimi Yamashita |

| 12 April 9 | Shimizu S-Pulse | 1–1 | Vegalta Sendai | Shimizu |
| 19:00 | Shirasaki 45' | Report | Goke 78' | Stadium: IAI Stadium Nihondaira; Attendance: 6,104; Referee: Ryo Tanimoto |

| 16 April 10 | Renofa Yamaguchi | 0–6 | Shimizu S-Pulse | Yamaguchi |
| 14:00 | Minagawa (yellow card) 24'; Matsuhashi (yellow card) 90+2' | Report | Ibayashi 14', 65'; Kitagawa 19'; Disaro 71'; Thiago Santana 85'; Nakayama 88' | Stadium: Ishin Me-Life Stadium; Attendance: 5,234; Referee: Dai Matsumoto |

| 22 April 11 | Omiya Ardija | 0–3 | Shimizu S-Pulse | Saitama |
| 14:00 | | Report | Inui 20'; Carlinhos Júnior 56'; Kamiya 87' | Stadium: NACK5 Stadium Omiya; Attendance: 9,316; Referee: Tomokazu Sato |

| 29 April 12 | Shimizu S-Pulse | 2–0 | Tochigi SC | Shimizu |
| 14:00 | Inui 39'; Kitazume 44' | Report | | Stadium: IAI Stadium Nihondaira; Attendance: 12,305; Referee: Hiroyoshi Takayama |

| 3 May 13 | Tokushima Vortis | 1–1 | Shimizu S-Pulse | Naruto |
| 14:00 | Abe 40' | Report | Suzuki 90+3' | Stadium: Pocarisweat Stadium; Attendance: 13,199; Referee: Yuzo Sutani |

| 7 May 14 | Shimizu S-Pulse | 9–1 | Iwaki FC | Shimizu |
| 14:00 | Inui 2'; Nakayama 16', 45+2', 57'; Ibayashi 51'; Carlinhos Júnior 52'; Thiago Santana 71', 85', 90+8' (pen.) | Report | Yoshizawa 90+4' | Stadium: IAI Stadium Nihondaira; Attendance: 8,022; Referee: Atsushi Kamimura |

| 13 May 15 | Shimizu S-Pulse | 5–0 | Fujieda MYFC | Shimizu |
| 14:00 | Thiago Santana 3'; Carlinhos Júnior 14', 72'; Kitagawa 16'; Kitazume 27' | Report | | Stadium: IAI Stadium Nihondaira; Attendance: 14,167; Referee: Masuya Ueda |

| 17 May 16 | JEF United Chiba | v | Shimizu S-Pulse | Chiba |
| 19:00 | | Report | | Stadium: Fukuda Denshi Arena |

| 21 May 17 | Machida Zelvia | v | Shimizu S-Pulse | Machida |
| 14:00 | | Report | | Stadium: Machida GION Stadium |

| 28 May 18 | Shimizu S-Pulse | v | Zweigen Kanazawa | Shimizu |
| 14:00 | | Report | | Stadium: IAI Stadium Nihondaira |

| 3 June 19 | Montedio Yamagata | v | Shimizu S-Pulse | Tendo |
| 14:00 | | Report | | Stadium: ND Soft Stadium Yamagata |

| 11 June 20 | Roasso Kumamoto | v | Shimizu S-Pulse | Kumamoto |
| 19:00 | | Report | | Stadium: Egao Kenko Stadium |

| 25 June 22 | Thespakusatsu Gunma | v | Shimizu S-Pulse | Maebashi |
| 19:30 | | Report | | Stadium: Shoda Shoyu Stadium Gunma |

| 28 June 21 | Shimizu S-Pulse | v | Blaublitz Akita | Shimizu |
| 19:00 | | Report | | Stadium: IAI Stadium Nihondaira |

=== Emperor's Cup ===
| 7 June 2023 Second round | Shimizu S-Pulse | v | Match 21 winner | Shizuoka |
| 19:00 JST (UTC+9) | | | | Stadium: IAI Stadium Nihondaira |

=== J.League Cup ===
| Pos | Team | Pld | W | D | L | GF | GA | GD | Pts | Qualification |
|---|---|---|---|---|---|---|---|---|---|---|
| 1 | Urawa Red Diamonds | 6 | 1 | 5 | 0 | 5 | 4 | +1 | 8 (Note: Head-to-head points: Urawa Red Diamonds 6, Shimizu S-Pulse 5, Kawasaki Frontale 4.) | Advance to knockout stage |
| 2 | Shimizu S-Pulse | 6 | 2 | 2 | 2 | 8 | 15 | −7 | 8 | |
| 3 | Kawasaki Frontale | 6 | 2 | 2 | 2 | 12 | 7 | +5 | 8 | |
| 4 | Shonan Bellmare | 6 | 1 | 3 | 2 | 8 | 7 | +1 | 6 | |

Source: JLeague.co (EN), JLeague.jp (JA)
Rules for classification: Tiebreakers
Notes:

| 8 March | Shimizu S-Pulse | 3–2 | Kawasaki Frontale | Shizuoka |
| 19:03 | Oh Se-hun 6'; Shirasaki 7'; Nakayama 70' | JLeague.co (EN); JLeague.jp (JA) | Chanathip 67'; Miyashiro 82' (pen.) | Stadium: IAI Stadium Nihondaira; Attendance: 6,900; Referee: Shu Kawamata |

| 26 March | Urawa Red Diamonds | 1–1 | Shimizu S-Pulse | Saitama |
| 15:03 | Linssen 38' | JLeague.co (EN); JLeague.jp (JA) | Kololli 71' | Stadium: Urawa Komaba Stadium; Attendance: 10,125; Referee: Koei Koya |

| 5 April | Shonan Bellmare | 3–0 | Shimizu S-Pulse | Hiratsuka |
| 19:03 | Suzuki 21'; Yamada 40', 51' | JLeague.co (EN); JLeague.jp (JA) | | Stadium: Lemon Gas Stadium Hiratsuka; Attendance: 7,204; Referee: Takafumi Mikuriya |

| 19 April | Kawasaki Frontale | 6–0 | Shimizu S-Pulse | Kawasaki |
| 19:03 | Tono 13', 16'; Kurumaya 58'; Seko 69'; Wakizaka 84', 89' | JLeague.co (EN); JLeague.jp (JA) | | Stadium: Kawasaki Todoroki Stadium; Attendance: 15,081; Referee: Keigo Sendachi |

| 24 May | Shimizu S-Pulse | v | Shonan Bellmare | Shizuoka |
| 19:00 | | JLeague.co (EN); JLeague.jp (JA) | | Stadium: IAI Stadium Nihondaira |

| 18 June | Shimizu S-Pulse | v | Urawa Red Diamonds | Shizuoka |
| 18:00 | | JLeague.co (EN); JLeague.jp (JA) | | Stadium: IAI Stadium Nihondaira |
