= 2022 Shimizu S-Pulse season =

Shimizu S-Pulse
2022 season
- Chairman: Shigeo Hidaritomo
- Manager: Hiroaki Hiraoka (until 30 May); Zé Ricardo (from 7 June)
- Stadium: IAI Stadium Nihondaira
- J1 League: 17th (relegated)
- J. League Cup: Group stage (3rd of 4 on Group B)
- Emperor's Cup: Third round
- Top goalscorer: League: Thiago Santana (14 goals); All: Thiago Santana (16 goals)
- Highest home attendance: 18,182; 1–1 vs. Júbilo Iwata (22 October)
- Lowest home attendance: 6,806; 0–3 vs. FC Tokyo (25 May)
- Average home league attendance: 15,245
Home colours	Away colours	Third colours

The 2022 season was Shimizu S-Pulse's 29th season in the J1 League. It also was their 6th consecutive season in the J1, since coming back to the J1 in 2017.

== Overview ==
It was another season where difficulties and struggles hit Shimizu S-Pulse back and forth during the year. Under Hiraoka's management, Shimizu's lack of matches won and players not on their best form were a determining factor for their average-to-poor performances in each of the 3 competitions they played in.

Prior to the start of the season, Shimizu had made 5 signings, while at the same time gradually announcing 10 departures from the team. Se-hun's arrival from K League 1 powerhouse Ulsan Hyundai completed Shimizu's 6 signings at the start of the year. These signings included 2 J1 League players, a J2 League player, a recently graduated high school student, Japan's starting goalkeeper, and a promising South Korean talent. Still, they couldn't figure out a way to be increasingly benefit from the transfer management throughout the season. Spilling away 3 defenders and making no replacements in the sector also gave Hiraoka headaches with the starting XI, as the team had in total 6 available defenders. Several times through the season – including its start – Teruki Hara had to be played at the defense, despite being a midfielder. Full-backs Katayama and Yamahara frequently played in different positions, with Yamahara playing on both sides of the pitch, as a full-back on the left and on the right. The same applied to Katayama, who additionally played a few times as a center-back.

Some players in special surprisingly didn't keep their good form this season. The more evident examples were Matsuoka and Oh Se-hun. Matsuoka, who played a large number of matches in the previous season at club and national team level, surprisingly saw little game time under his management. Shimizu S-Pulse rarely made use of the squad rotation despite having more than 15 available options for both the midfield and attack. The situation was influenced by the players' not-so-good-form on most of the season. Oh Se-hun was other player who couldn't live up to the expectations. After debuting on 6 April, he scored a goal on his second match for the club, run out of form, and little game time was given onwards.

Some players in special were, however, highly utilized by both managers, with Shuichi Gonda, Reon Yamahara, Eiichi Katayama, Ryohei Shirasaki, Thiago Santana and Teruki Hara playing the most minutes among the Shimizu's players throughout the season, including the starting XI.

At the very start of the season Shimizu had a tiny unbeaten streak at the J1 League, with no loss in their first 2 matches. However, their league situation as firmly more delicated as the time passed, winning only 1 of their next 15 matches at the competition, from March to May. It wasn't much different from their J.League Cup campaign, failing to progress from the group stage, despite being unbeaten in the first 3 matches. Giving Tokushima Vortis their lone win at the group by a three-goal defeat influenced the Shizuoka side's hopes of clearing the group stage to turn into dust. Being it the last straw, Hiroaki Hiraoka was sacked. Shimizu saw reinforcements being made during the mid-season. Former Japan international footballers Koya Kitagawa and Takashi Inui were signed to the club, alongside Yago Pikachu, who was signed from Fortaleza, playing as a starter in most of the matches with the club in the Brasileirão and in the Libertadores. Despite no defensive signings (Pikachu can play as a right-back, but is primarily a midfielder), after hiring Brazilian manager Zé Ricardo, the club saw an improvement in performances and results since his signing. Under Hiraoka, only 2 wins were earned in 16 J1 matches, while under mid-season hired Zé Ricardo, they were able to win 4 matches, draw 3, and lose 3, out of his first 10 matches at the club.

However, on the last few rounds of the J1 League, a poor form hit Shimizu. As the league became more and more competitive for the teams in relegation danger, Shimizu got trapped in a heavy turmoil of uncertainties about their stay in J1 League, as few points separated the team at the bottom of the league and the 14th-placed team, to compare. On the last round of the season, Shimizu stayed for some minutes in the relegation play-offs zone. They were winning Sapporo by 3-2, with Kyoto Sanga drawing 0-0 against Júbilo, so Shimizu only needed to score more one goal, to match Kyoto's goal difference to finally be ahead of them in the standings, or to hope Kyoto Sanga conceded a goal. However, they conceded two goals, one at the 86th minute, and one at the added time. This 4-3 defeat away at Sapporo Dome led Shimizu S-Pulse to be relegated to the J2 League, returning to the second division after six seasons in the top-flight.

== Squad ==
Players' age displayed in this section dates to the start of the season.

No.	Pos.	Nat.	Player	Date of birth (age)	Fully signed in	Signed from / Last club
Goalkeepers
1	GK	(Japan)	Takuo Ōkubo	18 September 1989 (aged 32)	2019	(Japan) Sagan Tosu
21	GK	(Japan)	Shuichi Gonda	3 March 1989 (aged 32)	2022	(Portugal) Portimonense
25	GK	(Japan)	Kengo Nagai	6 November 1994 (aged 27)	2021	(Japan) Giravanz Kitakyushu
31	GK	(Japan)	Togo Umeda	3 July 2000 (aged 21)	2020	(Japan) Shimizu S-Pulse U-18
41	GK	(Japan)	Fugetsu Kitamura	6 December 2005 (aged 16)	Not fully signed	(Japan) Shimizu S-Pulse U-18^{Type 2}
Defenders
2	DF	(Japan)	Yugo Tatsuta	21 June 1998 (aged 23)	2017	(Japan) Shimizu S-Pulse U-18
4	DF	(Japan)	Teruki Hara	30 July 1998 (aged 23)	2021	(Japan) Sagan Tosu
5	DF	(Brazil)	Valdo	10 February 1992 (aged 30)	2020	(Brazil) Ceará
7	DF	(Japan)	Eiichi Katayama	30 November 1991 (aged 30)	2020	(Japan) Cerezo Osaka
29	DF	(Japan)	Reon Yamahara	8 June 1999 (aged 22)	2022	(Japan) University of Tsukuba
34	DF	(Japan)	Taketo Ochiai	27 April 2000 (aged 21)	2023	(Japan) Hosei University ^{DSP}
38	DF	(Japan)	Akira Ibayashi	5 September 1990 (aged 31)	2021	(Japan) Sanfrecce Hiroshima
50	DF	(Japan)	Yoshinori Suzuki	11 September 1992 (aged 29)	2021	(Japan) Oita Trinita
Midfielders
3	MF	(Brazil)	Ronaldo	23 October 1996 (aged 25)	2021	(Brazil) Flamengo
6	MF	(Japan)	Ryo Takeuchi	8 March 1991 (aged 30)	2013	(Japan) Giravanz Kitakyushu
8	MF	(Japan)	Daiki Matsuoka	1 June 2001 (aged 20)	2021	(Japan) Sagan Tosu
11	MF	(Japan)	Katsuhiro Nakayama	17 July 1996 (aged 25)	2021	(Japan) Yokohama FC
13	MF	(Japan)	Kota Miyamoto	19 June 1996 (aged 25)	2020	(Japan) FC Gifu
15	MF	(Japan)	Takeru Kishimoto	16 July 1997 (aged 24)	2022	(Japan) Tokushima Vortis
16	MF	(Japan)	Kenta Nishizawa	6 September 1996 (aged 25)	2019	(Japan) University of Tsukuba
17	MF	(Japan)	Yuta Kamiya	24 April 1997 (aged 24)	2022	(Japan) Kashiwa Reysol
18	MF	(Japan)	Ryōhei Shirasaki	18 May 1993 (aged 28)	2022	(Japan) Kashima Antlers
22	MF	(Brazil)	Renato Augusto	29 January 1992 (aged 30)	2019	(Brazil) Palmeiras
23	MF	(Japan)	Yuito Suzuki	25 October 2001 (aged 20)	2020	(Japan) Funabashi Municipal High School
27	MF	(Brazil)	Yago Pikachu	5 June 1992 (aged 29)	2022	(Brazil) Fortaleza
32	MF	(Kosovo)	Benjamin Kololli	15 May 1992 (aged 29)	2021	(Switzerland) Zürich
33	MF	(Japan)	Takashi Inui	2 June 1988 (aged 33)	2022	Unattached
34	MF	(Japan)	Yuta Taki	29 August 1999 (aged 22)	2017	(Japan) Shimizu S-Pulse U-18
37	MF	(Japan)	Daigo Takahashi	17 April 1999 (aged 22)	2018	(Japan) Kamimura Gakuen High School
42	MF	(Japan)	Aoi Ando	4 January 2005 (aged 17)	Not fully signed	(Japan) Shimizu S-Pulse U-18^{Type 2}
43	MF	(Japan)	Riku Yamada	15 May 2004 (aged 17)	Not fully signed	(Japan) Shimizu S-Pulse U-18^{Type 2}
44	MF	(Japan)	Ryunosuke Yada	30 September 2006 (aged 15)	Not fully signed	(Japan) Shimizu S-Pulse U-18^{Type 2}
Forwards
9	FW	(Brazil)	Thiago Santana	4 February 1993 (aged 29)	2021	(Portugal) Santa Clara
10	FW	(Brazil)	Carlinhos Júnior	8 August 1994 (aged 27)	2020	(Switzerland) Lugano
14	FW	(Japan)	Yusuke Goto	23 April 1993 (aged 28)	2020	(Japan) Oita Trinita
20	FW	(South Korea)	Oh Se-hun	15 January 1999 (aged 23)	2022	(Japan) Ulsan Hyundai
35	FW	(Japan)	Sena Saito	21 November 2000 (aged 21)	2023	(Japan) Ryutsu Keizai University^{DSP}
45	FW	(Japan)	Koya Kitagawa	26 July 1996 (aged 25)	2022	(Austria) Rapid Wien

== Transfers ==
=== Arrivals/loans in ===
Pos.	Nat.	Player	Date	Type	Signed from / Last club
MF	(Japan)	Nagi Kawatani	23 October 2021	Full transfer	(Japan) Shizuoka Gakuen High School
MF	(Japan)	Yuta Kamiya	22 December 2021	Full transfer	(Japan) Kashiwa Reysol
GK	(Japan)	Shuichi Gonda	23 December 2021	Full transfer	(Portugal) Portimonense
MF	(Japan)	Takeru Kishimoto	25 December 2021	Full transfer	(Japan) Tokushima Vortis
MF	(Japan)	Ryōhei Shirasaki	27 December 2021	Full transfer	(Japan) Kashima Antlers
MF	(Japan)	Daigo Takahashi	30 December 2021	Back from loan	(Japan) Giravanz Kitakyushu
MF	(Japan)	Hikaru Naruoka	30 December 2021	Back from loan	(Japan) SC Sagamihara
FW	(Japan)	Ibrahim Junior Kuribara	7 January 2022	Back from loan	(Japan) Suzuka Point Getters
FW	(South Korea)	Oh Se-hun	24 February 2022	Full transfer	(Japan) Ulsan Hyundai
GK	(Japan)	Togo Umeda	10 June 2022	Back from loan	(Japan) Fagiano Okayama
FW	(Japan)	Koya Kitagawa	19 June 2022	Full transfer	(Austria) Rapid Wien
MF	(Brazil)	Yago Pikachu	17 July 2022	Full transfer	(Brazil) Fortaleza
MF	(Japan)	Takashi Inui	22 July 2022	Full transfer	(Japan) Cerezo Osaka
FW	(Japan)	Takumi Kato	6 October 2022	Back from loan	(Japan) SC Sagamihara

Source: J.League

=== Departures/Loans out ===
Pos.	Nat.	Player	Date	Type	Loaned to/Transferred to
GK	(Japan)	Toru Takagiwa	17 December 2021	Full transfer	(Japan) Tokyo Verdy
MF	(Japan)	Keita Nakamura	23 December 2021	Full transfer	(Japan) Kashiwa Reysol
MF	(Japan)	Shota Kaneko	24 December 2021	Full transfer	(Japan) Júbilo Iwata
MF	(Japan)	Hideki Ishige	27 December 2021	Full transfer	(Japan) Gamba Osaka
MF	(Japan)	Yosuke Kawai	27 December 2021	Full transfer	(Japan) Fagiano Okayama
DF	(Japan)	Ryo Okui	28 December 2021	Full transfer	(Japan) V-Varen Nagasaki
DF	(Brazil)	Elsinho	30 December 2021	Contract expiration	Unattached
DF	(Peru)	Erick Noriega	30 December 2021	Full transfer	(Germany) SV 19 Straelen
MF	(Japan)	Noriaki Fujimoto	9 January 2022	Full transfer	(Japan) Vissel Kobe
FW	(Japan)	Hiroshi Ibusuki	14 January 2022	Full transfer	(Australia) Adelaide United
FW	(Japan)	Kanta Chiba	23 May 2022	Loan transfer	(Japan) FC Imabari
MF	(Japan)	Takumi Kato	31 May 2022	Loan transfer	(Japan) SC Sagamihara
FW	(Japan)	Akira Silvano Disaro	11 July 2022	Loan transfer	(Japan) Montedio Yamagata
FW	(Japan)	Ibrahim Junior Kuribara	19 July 2022	Loan transfer	(Japan) Fukushima United
DF	(Japan)	Shuta Kikuchi	22 July 2022	Loan transfer	(Japan) FC Imabari
FW	(Japan)	Riyo Kawamoto	1 August 2022	Loan transfer	(Japan) Thespakusatsu Gunma
MF	(Japan)	Nagi Kawatani	2 August 2022	Loan transfer	(Japan) Iwaki FC
MF	(Japan)	Hikaru Naruoka	22 August 2022	Loan transfer	(Japan) Renofa Yamaguchi

Source: J.League

== Competitions played in ==
=== J1 League ===
Pos	Team	Pld	W	D	L	GF	GA	GD	Pts	Qualification or relegation
14	Avispa Fukuoka	34	9	11	14	29	38	−9	38	
15	Gamba Osaka	34	9	10	15	33	44	−11	37	
16	Kyoto Sanga (O)	34	8	12	14	30	38	−8	36	Qualification for relegation playoffs
17	Shimizu S-Pulse (R)	34	7	12	15	44	54	−10	33	Relegation to the J2 League
18	Júbilo Iwata (R)	34	6	12	16	32	57	−25	30	Relegation to the J2 League

Source: J.League Data Site
Rules for classification: 1) Points; 2) Goal difference; 3) Goals scored; 4) Head-to-head points; 5) Head-to-head goal difference; 6) Head-to-head goals scored; 7) Fewer disciplinary points.
(O) Play-off winners; (R) Relegated

==== J1 League Results ====
19 February 2022 1	Shimizu S-Pulse	1–1	Consadole Sapporo	Shizuoka
14:03	Yt. Suzuki 68'	Report	L. Fernandes 15'	Stadium: IAI Stadium Nihondaira; Attendance: 9,357; Referee: Futoshi Nakamura

26 February 2022 2	Júbilo Iwata	1–2	Shimizu S-Pulse	Fukuroi
13:33	Yuto Suzuki 23'	Report	Yuito Suzuki 9'; Nakayama 67'	Stadium: Ecopa Stadium; Attendance: 19,130; Referee: Koei Koya

6 March 2022 3	Yokohama F. Marinos	2–0	Shimizu S-Pulse	Yokohama
14:03	R. Koike 32'; Yoshio 43'	Report		Stadium: Nissan Stadium; Attendance: 14,752; Referee: Takafumi Mikuriya

12 March 2022 4	Shimizu S-Pulse	1–3	Cerezo Osaka	Shizuoka
:03	Takahashi 54'	Report	Ibayashi 45' (o.g.); Okuno 57'; Uejo 83'	Stadium: IAI Stadium Nihondaira; Attendance: 10,887; Referee: Ryuji Sato

19 March 2022 5	Shimizu S-Pulse	0–0	Vissel Kobe	Shizuoka
14:03		Report		Stadium: IAI Stadium Nihondaira; Attendance: 13,106; Referee: Hajime Matsuo

2 April 2022 6	Kashima Antlers	2–1	Shimizu S-Pulse	Kashima
16:03	Ym. Suzuki 78'; Ueda 90+3'	Report	Kololli 70'	Stadium: Kashima Soccer Stadium; Attendance: 11,037; Referee: Ryo Tanimoto

6 April 2022 7	Urawa Red Diamonds	1–1	Shimizu S-Pulse	Saitama
19:03	Esaka 33' (pen.)	Report	Valdo 69'	Stadium: Saitama Stadium 2002; Attendance: 18,757; Referee: Akihiko Ikeuchi

10 April 2022 8	Shimizu S-Pulse	1–1	Gamba Osaka	Shizuoka
13:03	Oh Se-hun 57'	Report	Onose 90+7'	Stadium: IAI Stadium Nihondaira; Attendance: 12,938; Referee: Hiroki Kasahara

17 April 2022 9	Sagan Tosu	0–0	Shimizu S-Pulse	Tosu
15:03		Report		Stadium: Ekimae Real Estate Stadium; Attendance: 7,519; Referee: Hayato Shimizu

29 April 2022 10	Shimizu S-Pulse	2–2	Sanfrecce Hiroshima	Shizuoka
14:03	Santana 20', 70'	Report	Morishima 68'; Kashiwa 80'	Stadium: IAI Stadium Nihondaira; Attendance: 9,765; Referee: Yoshiro Imamura

3 May 2022 11	Shonan Bellmare	1–4	Shimizu S-Pulse	Hiratsuka
15:03	Oiwa 50'	Report	Nakayama 32'; Yt. Suzuki 36'; Shirasaki 38'; Ys. Suzuki 59'	Stadium: Lemon Gas Stadium Hiratsuka; Attendance: 12,052; Referee: Masuya Ueda

7 May 2022 12	Shimizu S-Pulse	0–2	Kawasaki Frontale	Shizuoka
14:03		Report	Wakizaka 14'; Marcinho 32'	Stadium: IAI Stadium Nihondaira; Attendance: 13,888; Referee: Koei Koya

14 May 2022 13	Kyoto Sanga	0–0	Shimizu S-Pulse	Kameoka
14:03		Report		Stadium: Sanga Stadium by Kyocera; Attendance: 12,399; Referee: Akihiko Ikeuchi

21 May 2022 14	Shimizu S-Pulse	1–2	Nagoya Grampus	Shizuoka
14:03	Santana 72'	Report	Sakai 22'; Soma 90+4'	Stadium: IAI Stadium Nihondaira; Attendance: 11,155; Referee: Takafumi Mikuriya

25 May 2022 15	Shimizu S-Pulse	0–3	FC Tokyo	Shizuoka
19:03		Report	Ogawa 45', 61'; Abe 75'	Stadium: IAI Stadium Nihondaira; Attendance: 6,806; Referee: Masaya Ueda

29 May 2022 16	Kashiwa Reysol	3–1	Shimizu S-Pulse	Kashiwa
16:03	Sávio 13'; Hosoya 39'; Ominami 58'	Report	Katayama 64'	Stadium: Sankyo Frontier Kashiwa Stadium; Attendance: 8,708; Referee: Tomohiro Inoue

18 June 2022 17	Shimizu S-Pulse	3–1	Avispa Fukuoka	Shizuoka
18:03	Nishizawa 7'; Santana 41'; Kololli 85'	Report	Yamagishi 80'	Stadium: IAI Stadium Nihondaira; Attendance: 10,920; Referee: Hiroyuki Kimura

26 June 2022 18	Cerezo Osaka	1–1	Shimizu S-Pulse	Osaka
18:03	Funaki 76'	Report	Jonjić 35' (o.g.)	Stadium: Yodoko Sakura Stadium; Attendance: 10,026; Referee: Yoshiro Imamura

2 July 2022 19	Shimizu S-Pulse	3–5	Yokohama F. Marinos	Tokyo
19:03	Kamiya 13'; Santana 47'; Katayama 90+6'	Report	Nishimura 10'; Ceará 45+2', 49', 52'; Miyaichi 88'	Stadium: Japan National Stadium; Attendance: 56,131; Referee: Ryuji Sato

6 July 2022 20	Vissel Kobe	2–1	Shimizu S-Pulse	Kobe
19:03	Yuruki 8'; Osako 90+2'	Report	Santana 66'	Stadium: Noevir Stadium Kobe; Attendance: 7,646; Referee: Ryo Tanimoto

10 July 2022 21	Nagoya Grampus	0–2	Shimizu S-Pulse	Toyota
18:03		Report	Nishizawa 38'; Santana 90+5'	Stadium: Toyota Stadium; Attendance: 12,904; Referee: Tomohiro Inoue

16 July 2022 22	Shimizu S-Pulse	1–2	Urawa Red Diamonds	Shizuoka
18:03	Yamahara 79'	Report	Matsuo 42'; Hara 73' (o.g.)	Stadium: IAI Stadium Nihondaira; Attendance: 11,776; Referee: Koichiro Fukushima

31 July 2022 23	Shimizu S-Pulse	3–3	Sagan Tosu	Shizuoka
18:03	Shirasaki 62'; Kitagawa 81'; Santana 83'	Report	Iwasaki 7'; Naganuma 30'; Horigome 80'	Stadium: IAI Stadium Nihondaira; Attendance: 11,823; Referee: Koei Koya

7 August 2022 24	FC Tokyo	0–2	Shimizu S-Pulse	Tokyo
18:03		Report	Carlinhos Jr. 58'; Santana 85'	Stadium: Ajinomoto Stadium; Attendance: 20,577; Referee: Hiroki Kasahara

14 August 2022 25	Gamba Osaka	0–2	Shimizu S-Pulse	Suita
19:03		Report	Kololli 73'; Carlinhos Jr. 86'	Stadium: Panasonic Stadium Suita; Attendance: 27,662; Referee: Yuichi Nishimura

20 August 2022 26	Shimizu S-Pulse	1–1	Kashiwa Reysol	Shizuoka
18:03	Santana 8'	Report	Muto 90+4'	Stadium: IAI Stadium Nihondaira; Attendance: 14,041; Referee: Futoshi Nakamura

27 August 2022 27	Shimizu S-Pulse	1–0	Kyoto Sanga	Shizuoka
18:03	Inui 68'	Report		Stadium: IAI Stadium Nihondaira; Attendance: 14,034; Referee: Hayato Shimizu

3 September 2022 28	Sanfrecce Hiroshima	2–0	Shimizu S-Pulse	Hiroshima
18:33	Kawamura 83', 90+3'	Report		Stadium: Edion Stadium Hiroshima; Attendance: 11,437; Referee: Koichiro Fukushima

10 September 2022 29	Shimizu S-Pulse	1–1	Shonan Bellmare	Shizuoka
18:03	Santana 12'	Report	Wellington 90+6'	Stadium: IAI Stadium Nihondaira; Attendance: 17,751; Referee: Hajime Matsuo

17 September 2022 30	Avispa Fukuoka	3–2	Shimizu S-Pulse	Fukuoka
19:03	Nakamura 36'; Yamagishi 42', 49'	Report	Yamahara 29'; Santana 60' (pen.)	Stadium: Best Denki Stadium; Attendance: 7,741; Referee: Yuichi Nishimura

8 October 2022 32	Kawasaki Frontale	3–2	Shimizu S-Pulse	Kawasaki
14:03	Tono 28'; Yamamura 76'; Kobayashi 78'	Report	Shirasaki 49'; Carlinhos Jr. 57'	Stadium: Kawasaki Todoroki Stadium; Attendance: 19,022; Referee: Hayato Shimizu

22 October 2022 31	Shimizu S-Pulse	1–1	Júbilo Iwata	Shizuoka
16:03	Santana 34'	Report	Germain 90+2'	Stadium: IAI Stadium Nihondaira; Attendance: 18,182; Referee: Ryuji Sato
Note: The Shizuoka Derby, due to be played at 1 October, had to be rescheduled on 28 September due to Typhoon No.15's strike in the Shizuoka region. Areas of Shizuoka City at the time remained without water, and roads near the stadium suffered from landslides, making it difficult to ensure the safety of attending fans and hold the match to standard. On 30 September, the rescheduled kick-off date was announced by the J.League.

29 October 2022 33	Shimizu S-Pulse	0–1	Kashima Antlers	Shizuoka
15:03		Report	Misao 56'	Stadium: IAI Stadium Nihondaira; Attendance: 16,605; Referee: Akihiko Ikeuchi

5 November 2022 34	Consadole Sapporo	4–3	Shimizu S-Pulse	Sapporo
14:03	Gabriel Xavier 41'; Aoki 60', 90+2'; Kim Gun-hee 86'	Report	Thiago Santana 49'; Shirasaki 51'; Ronaldo 78'	Stadium: Sapporo Dome; Attendance: 23,330; Referee: Yoshiro Imamura

Source: J.League

=== J. League Cup ===
Pos	Team	Pld	W	D	L	GF	GA	GD	Pts	Qualification
1	Sanfrecce Hiroshima	6	4	0	2	13	5	+8	12	Advance to play-off stage
2	Nagoya Grampus	6	3	1	2	6	4	+2	10	Advance to play-off stage
3	Shimizu S-Pulse	6	2	2	2	6	8	−2	8	
4	Tokushima Vortis	6	1	1	4	5	13	−8	4	

Source: JLeague.co (EN), JLeague.jp (JA)
Rules for classification: Tiebreakers

==== J.League Cup Results ====
23 February 2022	Nagoya Grampus	0–0	Shimizu S-Pulse	Toyota
14:03		JLeague.co (EN); JLeague.jp (JA)		Stadium: Toyota Stadium; Attendance: 8,285; Referee: Hiroyoshi Takayama

2 March 2022	Shimizu S-Pulse	1–1	Tokushima Vortis	Shizuoka
19:03	Kamiya 70'	JLeague.co (EN); JLeague.jp (JA)	Bakenga 23' (pen.)	Stadium: IAI Stadium Nihondaira; Attendance: 5,064; Referee: Tomohiro Inoue

26 March 2022	Sanfrecce Hiroshima	1–2	Shimizu S-Pulse	Hiroshima
14:03	Sumiyoshi 63'	JLeague.co (EN); JLeague.jp (JA)	Kololli 20'; Hara 38'	Stadium: Edion Stadium Hiroshima; Attendance: 2,082; Referee: Koichiro Fukushima

13 April 2022	Tokushima Vortis	4–1	Shimizu S-Pulse	Naruto
19:03	Sugimori 39', 52'; Hyon 47'; Kodama 72'	JLeague.co (EN); JLeague.jp (JA)	Kuribara 90'	Stadium: Pocarisweat Stadium; Attendance: 1,475; Referee: Yuichi Nishimura

23 April 2022	Shimizu S-Pulse	0–1	Nagoya Grampus	Shizuoka
14:03		JLeague.co (EN); JLeague.jp (JA)	Kanazaki 67' (pen.)	Stadium: IAI Stadium Nihondaira; Attendance: 7,688; Referee: Kazuyoshi Enomoto

18 May 2022	Shimizu S-Pulse	2–1	Sanfrecce Hiroshima	Shizuoka
19:03	Kishimoto 34'; Taki 83'	JLeague.co (EN); JLeague.jp (JA)	Nagai 62'	Stadium: IAI Stadium Nihondaira; Attendance: 4,209; Referee: Keigo Sendachi

=== Emperor's Cup ===
==== Emperor's Cup Results ====
1 June 2022 Second round	Shimizu S-Pulse	8−0	Shunan University	Shimizu
19:00	Thiago 13', 33'; Disaro 41', 49', 52'; Nakayama 44', 56'; Takeshima 84' (o.g.)	Report		Stadium: IAI Stadium Nihondaira; Attendance: 1,616; Referee: Hiroki Kasahara

22 June 2022 Third round	Shimizu S-Pulse	0−1	Kyoto Sanga	Shimizu
19:00		Report	Nakano 58'	Stadium: IAI Stadium Nihondaira; Attendance: 2,302; Referee: Hirokazu Otsubo

=== Overall record ===
This table shows their basic statistics throughout the season. In a troublesome season in result and performance terms, Shimizu couldn't make a solid run in neither of the three competitions it played in.

Competition	First match	Last match	Starting round	Final position	Record							
Competition	First match	Last match	Starting round	Final position	Pld	W	D	L	GF	GA	GD	Win %
J1 League	19 February 2022	5 November 2022	Matchday 1	17th	34	7	12	15	44	54	−10	20.59
Emperor's Cup	1 June 2022	22 June 2022	Second round	Third round	2	1	0	1	8	2	+6	50.00
J.League Cup	23 February 2022	18 May 2022	Group stage	Group stage	6	2	2	2	6	8	−2	33.33
Total					42	10	14	18	58	64	−6	23.81

Last updated: 5 November 2022
Source: Soccerway

== Appearances and goals ==
No.	Pos.	Name	J1 League		J.League Cup		Emperor's Cup		Total	
No.	Pos.	Name	Apps	Goals	Apps	Goals	Apps	Goals	Apps	Goals
1	GK	(Japan) Takuo Okubo	0+1	0	5	0	0	0	6	0
2	DF	(Japan) Yugo Tatsuta	24+2	0	2+2	0	2	0	32	0
3	MF	(Brazil) Ronaldo	11+8	1	0	0	0	0	19	1
4	DF	(Japan) Teruki Hara	21+4	0	2+1	1	1	0	29	1
5	DF	(Brazil) Valdo	7+1	1	2	0	0	0	8	3
6	MF	(Japan) Ryo Takeuchi	7+4	0	3	0	2	0	16	0
7	DF	(Japan) Eiichi Katayama	24+8	2	2+1	0	0	0	35	2
8	MF	(Japan) Daiki Matsuoka	10+12	0	3	0	0	0	25	0
9	FW	(Brazil) Thiago Santana	27	14	2+1	0	2	2	32	16
10	MF	(Brazil) Carlinhos Júnior	16+6	3	0+3	0	0	0	25	3
11	MF	(Japan) Katsuhiro Nakayama	13+5	2	3+2	0	1	2	24	4
13	MF	(Japan) Kota Miyamoto	16+4	0	2+1	0	1	0	24	0
14	MF	(Japan) Yusuke Goto	7+8	0	1	0	1+1	0	18	0
15	DF	(Japan) Takeru Kishimoto	1+9	0	4+1	1	1	0	16	1
16	MF	(Japan) Kenta Nishizawa	7+3	2	1+1	0	1+1	0	14	2
17	FW	(Japan) Yuta Kamiya	14+7	1	4+2	1	0+2	0	29	2
18	MF	(Japan) Ryohei Shirasaki	31	4	2+1	0	0+1	0	35	4
19	FW	(Japan) Akira Silvano Disaro	0+3	0	1	0	2	3	6	3
20	FW	(South Korea) Oh Se-hun	2+11	1	1+1	0	0+1	0	16	1
21	GK	(Japan) Shuichi Gonda	33	0	1	0	1	0	35	0
22	MF	(Brazil) Renato Augusto	0	0	0	0	0	0	0	0
23	FW	(Japan) Yuito Suzuki	16+4	3	1+3	0	0	0	24	3
24	DF	(Japan) Shuta Kikuchi	0	0	3	0	3	0	6	0
25	GK	(Japan) Kengo Nagai	0	0	0	0	1	0	1	0
26	MF	(Japan) Yuta Taki	0+9	0	3+1	1	0+2	0	15	1
27	MF	(Brazil) Yago Pikachu	8+4	0	0	0	0	0	12	0
29	DF	(Japan) Reon Yamahara	30+3	2	4+1	0	1	0	39	2
30	FW	(Japan) Kanta Chiba	0	0	1+1	0	0	0	2	0
31	GK	(Japan) Togo Umeda	0	0	0	0	0	0	0	0
32	MF	(Kosovo) Benjamin Kololli	3+17	3	2+1	1	1	0	24	4
33	MF	(Japan) Takashi Inui	12+3	4	0	0	0	0	15	4
34	DF	(Japan) Taketo Ochiai	0	0	0	0	0	0	0	0
35	FW	(Japan) Sena Saito	0	0	0	0	0	0	0	0
36	MF	(Japan) Ibrahim Junior Kuribara	0+2	0	0+2	1	0+1	0	5	1
37	FW	(Japan) Daigo Takahashi	1+5	1	3+1	0	0	0	10	1
38	DF	(Japan) Akira Ibayashi	2+2	0	3	0	1	0	8	0
39	MF	(Japan) Nagi Kawatani	0	0	0+1	0	0+1	0	2	0
40	MF	(Japan) Hikaru Naruoka	0	0	2+1	0	1	0	4	0
41	GK	(Japan) Fugetsu Kitamura	0	0	0	0	0	0	0	0
42	MF	(Japan) Aoi Ando	0	0	0	0	0	0	0	0
43	MF	(Japan) Riku Yamada	0	0	0	0	0	0	0	0
44	MF	(Japan) Ryunosuke Yada	0	0	0	0	0	0	0	0
45	FW	(Japan) Koya Kitagawa	4+6	1	0	0	0	0	10	1
50	DF	(Japan) Yoshinori Suzuki	33	1	2+1	0	1	0	37	1
–	FW	(Japan) Takumi Kato	0	0	0	0	0	0	0	0
