= Albert Puig =

Albert Puig may refer to:

- Albert Puig (swimmer)
- Albert Puig (football manager)
