= Kengo Kitazume =

Japanese footballer (born 1992)

Kengo Kitazume 北爪健吾
Personal information
- Full name: Kengo Kitazume
- Date of birth: 30 April 1992 (age 34)
- Place of birth: Gunma, Japan
- Height: 1.77 m (5 ft 9 1/2 in)
- Position: Right back

Team information
- Current team: Matsumoto Yamaga FC (on loan from Shimizu S-Pulse)
- Number: 30

Youth career
- 2008–2010: Maebashi Ikuei High School

College career
Years	Team	Apps	(Gls)
2011–2014	Senshu University		

Senior career*
Years	Team	Apps	(Gls)
2015–2017	JEF United Chiba	50	(0)
2018–2019	Yokohama FC	76	(6)
2020–2022	Kashiwa Reysol	41	(2)
2023–	Shimizu S-Pulse	98	(5)
2026–	→ Matsumoto Yamaga FC (loan)	3	(0)
- * Club domestic league appearances and goals as of 24 August 2026

Kengo Kitazume (北爪 健吾, Kitazume Kengo; born 30 April 1992) is a Japanese footballer who plays as a right back for Matsumoto Yamaga FC, on loan from J1 League club Shimizu S-Pulse.

== Career statistics ==
=== Club ===
As of 2 March 2023.

Appearances and goals by club, season and competition
Club	Season	League			National Cup		League Cup		Total	
Club	Season	Division	Apps	Goals	Apps	Goals	Apps	Goals	Apps	Goals
Japan			League		Emperor's Cup		J.League Cup		Total	
JEF United Chiba	2015	J2 League	11	0	2	0	–		13	0
JEF United Chiba	2016	J2 League	24	0	3	0	–		27	0
JEF United Chiba	2017	J2 League	15 (Note: Includes J1/J2 play-off game)	0	1	0	–		16	0
JEF United Chiba	Total		50	0	6	0	0	0	56	0
Yokohama FC	2018	J2 League	36	5	0	0	–		36	5
Yokohama FC	2019	J2 League	40	1	1	0	–		41	1
Yokohama FC	Total		76	6	1	0	0	0	77	6
Kashiwa Reysol	2020	J1 League	23	2	0	0	3	2	26	4
Kashiwa Reysol	2021	J1 League	10	0	1	0	2	0	13	0
Kashiwa Reysol	2022	J1 League	8	0	0	0	5	0	13	0
Kashiwa Reysol	Total		41	2	1	0	10	2	52	4
Shimizu S-Pulse	2023	J2 League	0	0	0	0	0	0	0	0
Career total			167	8	8	0	10	2	185	10
