= Teruki Hara =

Japanese footballer (born 1998)

Teruki Hara 原 輝綺
Personal information
- Full name: Teruki Hara
- Date of birth: 30 July 1998 (age 28)
- Place of birth: Saitama, Japan
- Height: 1.80 m (5 ft 11 in)
- Positions: Right back; defensive midfielder

Team information
- Current team: Nagoya Grampus
- Number: 70

Youth career
- –2013: AZ'86 Tokyo Ome
- 2014–2016: Ichiritsu Funabashi High School

Senior career*
Years	Team	Apps	(Gls)
2017–2018	Albirex Niigata	43	(1)
2019–2020	Sagan Tosu	47	(0)
2021–2024	Shimizu S-Pulse	94	(6)
2023	→ Grasshopper (loan)	12	(0)
2025–	Nagoya Grampus	42	(3)

International career^{‡}
2016–2017	Japan U-20	9	(1)
2018	Japan U-21	3	(0)
2018–2021	Japan U-23	7	(0)
2019–	Japan	1	(0)
Medal record
Representing Japan
Asian Games
Silver medal – second place	2018 Jakarta-Palembang	Team
AFC U-19 Championship
Gold medal – first place	2016 Bahrain
- * Club domestic league appearances and goals as of 12 August 2026 ‡ National team caps and goals as of 23:17, 7 July 2021 (UTC)

Teruki Hara (原 輝綺, Hara Teruki; born 30 July 1998) is a Japanese football player who plays as a right back or a defensive midfielder for J1 League Nagoya Grampus. He has represented Japan at under-20 level.

== Club career ==
Hara played junior football for AZ'86 Tokyo-Ome FC in Ome, Tokyo. He later played for the Funabashi Municipal High School Club in the Prince Takamado Cup Premier League before signing for J1 League club Albirex Niigata in September 2016. Hara made his debut for Albirex on the opening day of the 2017 season against Sanfrecce Hiroshima. He scored his first goal for the club against Ventforet Kofu on the 16 April 2017, scoring in the 11th minute.

Teruki made his league debut for Sagan against Nagoya Grampus on the 23 February 2019.

Teruki made his league debut for Shimizu against Kashima Antlers on the 27 February 2021. Teruki scored his first goal for the club against Oita Trinita on the 4 July 2021, scoring in the 67th minute.

On 29 December 2022, he joined Swiss Super League side Grasshopper Club Zürich on loan with an option to buy. He debuted in the first game following the winter break, in a 1–2 defeat to Young Boys, and was nominated to the starting lineup a week later in a 1–1 draw against FC Lugano. Unfortunately, on 1 February 2023, in a cup tie against FC Basel, his only third appearance for Grasshoppers, he dislocated his shoulder, ruling him out for over a month.

On 25 May 2023, Grasshoppers announced that he would return to his parent club following the conclusion of the season. He made a total twelve appearances and made five starting lineups.

== International career ==
Hara has represented Japan U-20 national team. He was a member of the Japan squad that won the 2016 AFC U-19 Championship. In May 2017, he was elected Japan for 2017 U-20 World Cup. At this tournament, he played all 4 matches as defensive midfielder.

On May 24, 2019, Hara has been called by Japan's head coach Hajime Moriyasu to feature in the Copa América played in Brazil. He made his debut on 17 June 2019 in the game against Chile, as a starter.

== Club statistics ==
Updated to 29 May 2023.

Club performance			League		Cup		League Cup		Total	
Season	Club	League	Apps	Goals	Apps	Goals	Apps	Goals	Apps	Goals
Japan			League		Emperor's Cup		J.League Cup		Total	
2017	Albirex Niigata	J1 League	18	1	1	0	2	0	21	1
2018	Albirex Niigata	J2 League	25	0	1	0	2	0	28	0
2019	Sagan Tosu	J1 League	19	0	3	0	5	0	27	0
2020	Sagan Tosu	J1 League	28	0	0	0	0	0	28	0
2021	Shimizu S-Pulse	J1 League	29	2	2	1	0	0	31	3
2022	Shimizu S-Pulse	J1 League	25	0	3	1	1	0	29	1
Japan Total			144	3	10	2	10	0	164	5
2022–23	Grasshopper	Swiss Super League	12	0	1	0	–		12	0
Total			155	3	10	2	10	0	176	5

== National team statistics ==
Japan national team
Year	Apps	Goals
2019	1	0
Total	1	0

== Honours ==
=== International ===
Japan U-19

- AFC U-19 Championship 2016
