= Ibrahim Junior Kuribara =

Japanese footballer

Ibrahim Junior Kuribara 栗原 イブラヒム ジュニア
Personal information
- Date of birth: 14 August 2001 (age 25)
- Place of birth: Tokorozawa, Saitama, Japan
- Height: 1.91 m (6 ft 3 in)
- Position: Forward

Team information
- Current team: SC Sagamihara

Youth career
- Kurinomi SC
- –2019: Mitsubishi Yowa

Senior career*
Years	Team	Apps	(Gls)
2020–2022	Shimizu S-Pulse	2	(0)
2020	→ Azul Claro Numazu (loan)	7	(0)
2021	→ Suzuka Point Getters (loan)	1	(0)
2022	→ Fukushima United FC (loan)	13	(1)
2023–	SC Sagamihara	0	(0)

International career^{‡}
2015–2016	Japan U15	9	(3)
2016–2017	Japan U16	6	(1)
2017–2018	Japan U17	9	(3)
2019	Japan U18	3	(0)
- * Club domestic league appearances and goals as of 21:54, 19 July 2022 (UTC) ‡ National team caps and goals as of 12:00, 16 December 2022 (UTC)

Ibrahim Junior Kuribara (栗原 イブラヒム ジュニア, Kuribara Iburahimu Junia; born 14 August 2001) is a Japanese footballer who plays as a forward for SC Sagamihara from 2023.

== Career ==
On 20 December 2022, Kuribara joined to J3 club, SC Sagamihara for upcoming 2023 season.

== Personal life ==
Kurihara was born in Tokorazawa to his Ghanaian Gonja father and Japanese mother.

== Club statistics ==
As of the end 2022 season.

Appearances and goals by club, season and competition
Club	Season	League			National cup		League cup		Total	
Club	Season	Division	Apps	Goals	Apps	Goals	Apps	Goals	Apps	Goals
Japan			League		Emperor's Cup		J. League Cup		Total	
Shimizu S-Pulse	2020	J1 League	0	0	0	0	0	0	0	0
Shimizu S-Pulse	2022	J1 League	2	0	1	0	2	1	5	1
Shimizu S-Pulse	Total		2	0	1	0	2	1	5	1
Azul Claro Numazu (loan)	2020	J3 League	7	0	0	0	—		7	0
Suzuka Point Getters (loan)	2021	JFL	1	0	0	0	—		1	0
Fukushima United (loan)	2022	J3 League	13	1	0	0	—		13	1
SC Sagamihara	2023	J3 League	0	0	0	0	—		0	0
Career total			24	1	1	0	2	1	25	2
