= Hikaru Naruoka =

Japanese association football player

Personal information
- Full name: Hikaru Naruoka
- Date of birth: 28 July 2002 (age 24)
- Place of birth: Shizuoka, Shizuoka, Japan
- Height: 1.70 m (5 ft 7 in)
- Position: Midfielder

Team information
- Current team: Renofa Yamaguchi
- Number: 40

Youth career
- Sena FC
- –2020: Shimizu S-Pulse

Senior career*
Years	Team	Apps	(Gls)
2020–2024	Shimizu S-Pulse	17	(0)
2021	→ SC Sagamihara (loan)	17	(0)
2022–2023	→ Renofa Yamaguchi (loan)	18	(3)
2025–	Renofa Yamaguchi	44	(2)

International career
2017	Japan U15	20	(2)
2018	Japan U16	13	(2)
2019	Japan U17	11	(1)
- * Club domestic league appearances and goals as of 21 August 2026

Hikaru Naruoka (成岡 輝瑠, Naruoka Hikaru; born 28 July 2002) is a Japanese footballer who plays as a midfielder for J2 League club, Renofa Yamaguchi.

== Career statistics ==
As of 24 July 2022

Club	Season	League			National Cup		League Cup		Other		Total	
Club	Season	Division	Apps	Goals	Apps	Goals	Apps	Goals	Apps	Goals	Apps	Goals
Shimizu S-Pulse	2020	J1 League	9	0	0	0	2 (Note: Appearances in the J.League Cup)	0	0	0	10	0
Shimizu S-Pulse	2021	J1 League	0	0	0	0	0	0	0	0	0	0
Shimizu S-Pulse	2022	J1 League	0	0	1 (Note: Appearances in the Emperor's Cup)	0	3	0	0	0	4	0
Shimizu S-Pulse	Total		9	0	1	0	5	0	0	0	14	0
SC Sagamihara (loan)	2021	J2 League	17	0	0	0	–		0	0	17	0
Career total			26	0	1	0	5	0	0	0	31	0

== Honours ==
Japan U16

- AFC U-16 Championship: 2018
