= Takashi Inui =

Japanese footballer (born 1988)

Takashi Inui 乾 貴士
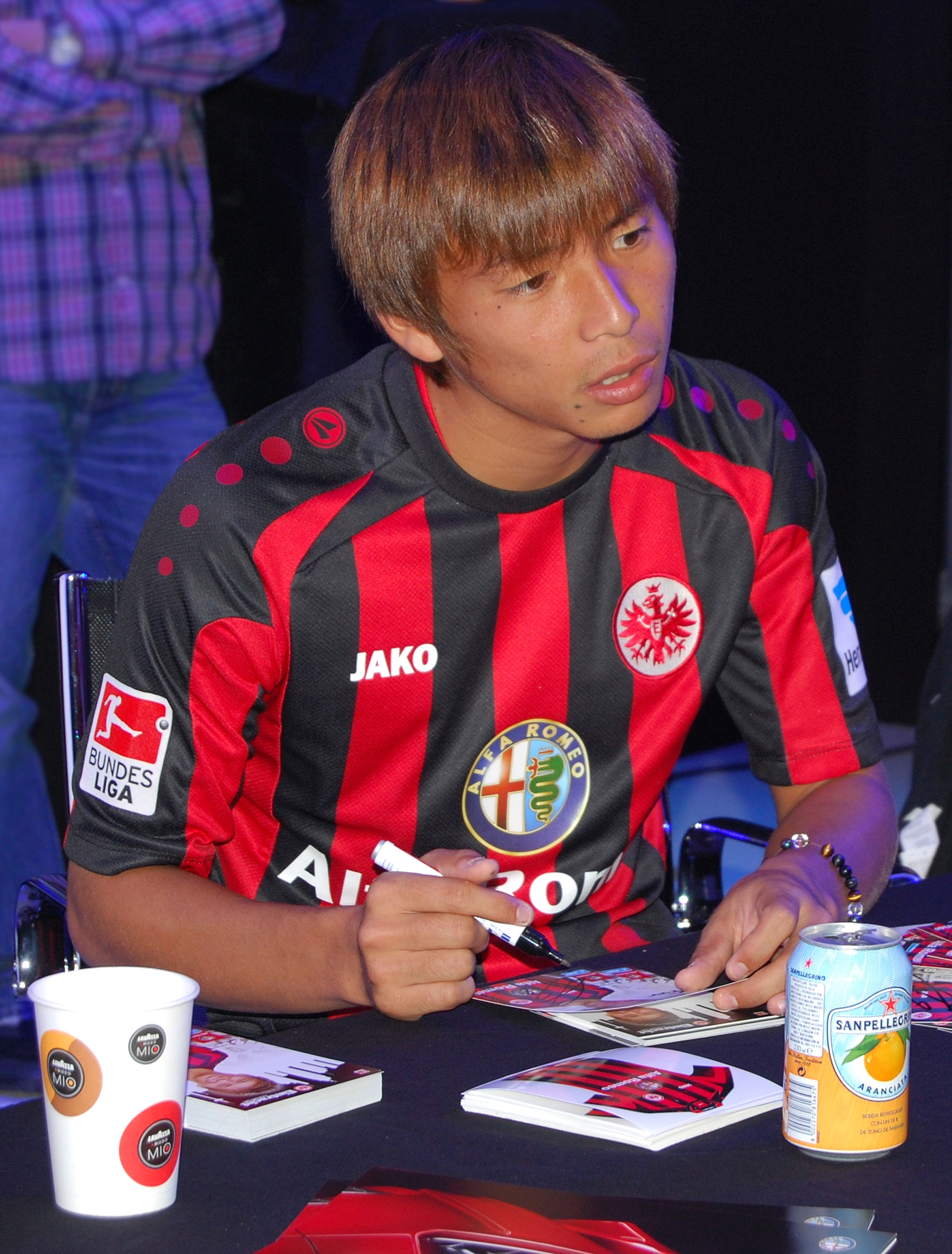
- Inui with Eintracht Frankfurt

Personal information
- Date of birth: 2 June 1988 (age 38)
- Place of birth: Ōmihachiman, Japan
- Height: 1.69 m (5 ft 7 in)
- Positions: Winger; attacking midfielder

Team information
- Current team: Júbilo Iwata
- Number: 23

Youth career
- 1995–2004: Osaka Saison FC
- 2004–2006: Yasu High School

Senior career*
Years	Team	Apps	(Gls)
2007–2009	Yokohama F. Marinos	7	(0)
2008	→ Cerezo Osaka (loan)	20	(6)
2009–2011	Cerezo Osaka	94	(29)
2011–2012	VfL Bochum	30	(7)
2012–2015	Eintracht Frankfurt	75	(7)
2015–2018	Eibar	89	(11)
2018–2019	Betis	8	(0)
2019	→ Alavés (loan)	12	(2)
2019–2021	Eibar	57	(3)
2021–2022	Cerezo Osaka	13	(4)
2022–2025	Shimizu S-Pulse	110	(19)
2026	Vissel Kobe	6	(0)
2026–	Júbilo Iwata	0	(0)

International career^{‡}
2006	Japan U21	2	(0)
2009–2019	Japan	36	(6)
Medal record
Representing Japan
AFC Asian Cup
Silver medal – second place	2019 United Arab Emirates
- * Club domestic league appearances and goals as of 23:41, 24 February 2026 (UTC) ‡ National team caps and goals as of 26 March 2019, 14:40 (UTC)

Takashi Inui (乾 貴士, Inui Takashi; born 2 June 1988) is a Japanese professional footballer who plays as a winger or an attacking midfielder for J1 League club Júbilo Iwata.

== Club career ==
Inui was an All Japan High School Soccer Tournament champion in 2006 with Yasu High School.

In 2007, Inui joined Yokohama F. Marinos of the J. League Division 1 and made his debut as a professional against Yokohama F.C. in a league match on 10 March. However, he failed to find a regular spot at Marinos and was loaned to then J. League Division 2 Cerezo Osaka in June 2008, earning himself a permanent move at the end of the season.

In July 2011, Inui made the jump to Europe, joining Germany's VfL Bochum. He made his debut in the 2. Bundesliga, when he started in a 2–1 home defeat versus FC St. Pauli on 13 August 2011.

In July 2012, Inui signed a three-year contract with newly promoted Bundesliga club Eintracht Frankfurt after impressive performance in the 2. Bundesliga.

=== Eibar ===
On 26 August 2015, Inui was transferred to La Liga side SD Eibar for a then club record fees of € 300,000, after agreeing to a three-year contract. He became the first Asian player to play for the club. On moving to Eibar, Inui said, “It was always my dream to play in the Spanish league one day. It’s been my dream since I was a child and now it’s come true”.

Takashi made his debut for Eibar on 23 September 2015, starting and providing one assist in a 2–2 draw against Levante. He scored his first league goal for Eibar on 10 January 2016 in a 2–1 win against RCD Espanyol, scoring the first goal in the 15th minute of game and also providing assist for second goal.

In April 2017, as the club was chasing a UEFA Europa League place, he was controversially called back to his homeland by Japan's prime minister to serve as a delegate for the visit of King Felipe VI of Spain to Japan. On 21 May 2017, Inui became the first Japanese footballer to score against FC Barcelona, sniping the ball via cross-bar behind Ter Stegen, twice.

=== Real Betis ===
On 1 June 2018, upon expiration of his Eibar contract, Inui joined Real Betis on a free transfer for a three-year deal. He made his debut for Betis on 17 August 2018, coming on as a substitute for William Carvalho for the last 25 minutes in 3–0 loss against Levante.

==== Alavés (loan) ====
The following 24 January, after being sparingly used, he moved to fellow league Deportivo Alavés on loan until the end of the season. He made his debut for Alavés on 11 January 2019 in a 2–0 win Levante. He scored his first goal for Alavés on 2 March 2019 in a 2–1 victory against Villarreal.

=== Return to Eibar ===
On 24 July 2019, Inui returned to Eibar on a three-year deal, for a €2 million transfer fee.

=== Shimizu S-Pulse ===
On 22 July 2022, Shimizu S-Pulse announced that they have signed Inui after his contract with Cerezo Osaka was terminated. On 27 October 2024, Inui was brought his club secure promotion to J1 League from next season after win at away game against Tochigi SC 1-2 in matchweek 36. Seven days later at same year, Inui was brought his club secure champions of J2 in 2024 season after defeat Iwaki FC with narrowly score 1-0 in matchweek 37.

== International career ==
Inui made his full international debut for Japan on 20 January 2009 in a 2011 AFC Asian Cup qualification against Yemen. In May 2018 he was named in Japan's preliminary squad for the 2018 World Cup in Russia. On 24 June, Inui scored his first World Cup goal in a 2–2 draw over Senegal during their second group stage match of the tournament. Inui went on to score another goal and registered an assist in the tournament.

== Career statistics ==
=== Club ===
As of 24 February 2026.

Appearances and goals by club, season and competition
Club	Season	League			National cup (Note: Includes Emperor's Cup and DFB-Pokal and Copa del Rey.)		League Cup (Note: Includes J. League Cup.)		Continental (Note: Includes AFC Champions League and UEFA Europa League.)		Total	
Club	Season	Division	Apps	Goals	Apps	Goals	Apps	Goals	Apps	Goals	Apps	Goals
Yokohama F. Marinos	2007	J.League Div 1	7	0	0	0	3	0	—		10	0
Yokohama F. Marinos	2008	J.League Div 1	0	0	—		3	0	—		3	0
Yokohama F. Marinos	Total		7	0	0	0	6	0	—		13	0
Cerezo Osaka	2008	J.League Div 2	20	6	2	0	—		—		22	6
Cerezo Osaka	2009	J.League Div 2	47	20	1	1	—		—		48	21
Cerezo Osaka	2010	J.League Div 1	33	4	2	1	6	0	—		41	5
Cerezo Osaka	2011	J.League Div 1	14	5	—		—		7	4	21	9
Cerezo Osaka	Total		114	35	5	2	6	0	7	4	132	41
VfL Bochum	2011–12	2. Bundesliga	30	7	2	0	—		—		32	7
Eintracht Frankfurt	2012–13	Bundesliga	33	6	1	0	—		—		34	6
Eintracht Frankfurt	2013–14	Bundesliga	14	0	2	1	—		6	1	22	2
Eintracht Frankfurt	2014–15	Bundesliga	27	1	2	0	—		0	0	29	1
Eintracht Frankfurt	2015–16	Bundesliga	1	0	1	0	—		0	0	2	0
Eintracht Frankfurt	Total		75	7	6	1	—		6	1	87	9
Eibar	2015–16	La Liga	27	3	2	0	—		—		29	3
Eibar	2016–17	La Liga	28	3	2	0	—		—		30	3
Eibar	2017–18	La Liga	34	5	1	0	—		—		35	5
Eibar	2019–20	La Liga	29	2	0	0	—		—		29	2
Eibar	2020–21	La Liga	28	1	2	0	—		—		30	1
Eibar	Total		146	14	7	0	—		—		153	14
Real Betis	2018–19	La Liga	8	0	2	0	—		4	0	14	0
Alavés (loan)	2018–19	La Liga	12	2	0	0	—		—		12	2
Cerezo Osaka	2021	J1 League	8	1	0	0	4	0	1	0	13	1
Cerezo Osaka	2022	J1 League	5	3	—		1	1	—		6	4
Cerezo Osaka	Total		13	4	0	0	5	1	1	0	19	5
Shimizu S-Pulse	2022	J1 League	10	1	0	0	—				10	1
Shimizu S-Pulse	2023	J2 League	32	10	0	0	3	0	—		35	10
Shimizu S-Pulse	2024	J2 League	30	5	1	0	—				31	5
Shimizu S-Pulse	2025	J1 League	38	3	3	0	0	0	—		41	3
Shimizu S-Pulse	Total		110	19	4	0	3	0	—		117	19
Vissel Kobe	2026	J1 (100)	1	0	0	0	—				1	0
Career total			516	88	26	3	20	1	18	5	580	97

=== International ===
As of 26 March 2019

Appearances and goals by national team and year
National team	Year	Apps	Goals
Japan	2009	1	0
Japan	2010	2	0
Japan	2011	0	0
Japan	2012	3	0
Japan	2013	6	0
Japan	2014	2	2
Japan	2015	5	0
Japan	2016	0	0
Japan	2017	6	0
Japan	2018	6	4
Japan	2019	5	0
Total		36	6

Scores and results list Japan's goal tally first, score column indicates score after each Inui goal.

List of international goals scored by Takashi Inui
No.	Date	Venue	Opponent	Score	Result	Competition
1	14 November 2014	Toyota Stadium, Toyota, Japan	Honduras	4–0	6–0	Friendly
2	14 November 2014	Toyota Stadium, Toyota, Japan	Honduras	5–0	6–0	Friendly
3	12 June 2018	Tivoli-Neu, Innsbruck, Austria	Paraguay	1–1	4–2	Friendly
4	12 June 2018	Tivoli-Neu, Innsbruck, Austria	Paraguay	2–1	4–2	Friendly
5	24 June 2018	Central Stadium, Yekaterinburg, Russia	Senegal	1–1	2–2	2018 FIFA World Cup
6	2 July 2018	Rostov Arena, Rostov-on-Don, Russia	Belgium	2–0	2–3	2018 FIFA World Cup

== Honours ==
Shimizu S-Pulse

- J2 League: 2024

Vissel Kobe

- J1 100 Year Vision League: 2026

Individual

- J2 League Best XI: 2023, 2024
