= Akira Ibayashi =

Japanese footballer

Akira Ibayashi 井林 章
Personal information
- Full name: Akira Ibayashi
- Date of birth: September 5, 1990 (age 36)
- Place of birth: Higashihiroshima, Hiroshima, Japan
- Height: 1.79 m (5 ft 10 1/2 in)
- Position: Centre back

Team information
- Current team: Kamatamare Sanuki
- Number: 3

Youth career
- 2006–2008: Hiroshima Minami High School

College career
Years	Team	Apps	(Gls)
2009–2012	Kwansei Gakuin University		

Senior career*
Years	Team	Apps	(Gls)
2013–2018	Tokyo Verdy	237	(11)
2019–2021	Sanfrecce Hiroshima	19	(0)
2021–2024	Shimizu S-Pulse	47	(3)
2024	Kagoshima United	25	(2)
2025-	Kamatamare Sanuki	17	(0)
- * Club domestic league appearances and goals as of 1 January 2026

Akira Ibayashi (井林 章, Ibayashi Akira; born September 5, 1990) is a Japanese football player. He currently plays for Kamatamare Sanuki.

== Club statistics ==
Updated to 24 July 2022.

Club performance			League		Cup		League Cup		Continental		Other		Total	
Season	Club	League	Apps	Goals	Apps	Goals	Apps	Goals	Apps	Goals	Apps	Goals	Apps	Goals
Japan			League		Emperor's Cup		J.League Cup		AFC				Total	
2013	Tokyo Verdy	J2 League	28	1	2	0	–		–		–		30	1
2014	Tokyo Verdy	J2 League	37	0	1	1	–		–		–		38	1
2015	Tokyo Verdy	J2 League	41	2	2	0	–		–		–		43	2
2016	Tokyo Verdy	J2 League	38	4	3	0	–		–		–		41	4
2017	Tokyo Verdy	J2 League	41	3	0	0	–		–		1 (Note: Appearances in J2 league promotion playoffs)	0	42	3
2018	Tokyo Verdy	J2 League	42	1	0	0	–		–		3	0	45	1
2019	Sanfrecce Hiroshima	J1 League	4	0	2	0	2	0	3	0	–		11	0
2020	Sanfrecce Hiroshima	J1 League	12	0	0	0	1	0	–		–		13	0
2021	Sanfrecce Hiroshima	J1 League	3	0	1	0	5	0	–		–		9	0
2021	Shimizu S-Pulse	J1 League	16	0	0	0	0	0	–		–		16	0
2022	Shimizu S-Pulse	J1 League	3	0	1	0	3	0	–		–		7	0
Total			275	11	12	1	11	0	3	0	4	0	305	12
