= Eiichi Katayama =

Japanese footballer

Eiichi Katayama 片山 瑛一
Personal information
- Full name: Eiichi Katayama
- Date of birth: November 30, 1991 (age 34)
- Place of birth: Saitama, Japan
- Height: 1.81 m (5 ft 11 in)
- Position: Wing back

Team information
- Current team: Urawa Red Diamonds
- Number: 32

Youth career
- 2004–2006: Kawagoe Nishi Junior High School
- 2007–2009: Kawagoe High School

College career
Years	Team	Apps	(Gls)
2010–2013	Waseda University		

Senior career*
Years	Team	Apps	(Gls)
2014–2017	Fagiano Okayama	146	(15)
2018–2020	Cerezo Osaka	58	(1)
2019	→ Cerezo Osaka U-23 (loan)	2	(0)
2021–2022	Shimizu S-Pulse	60	(4)
2023–2025	Kashiwa Reysol	39	(1)
2026–	Urawa Red Diamonds	0	(0)
- * Club domestic league appearances and goals as of 14:31, 23 March 2026 (UTC)

Eiichi Katayama (片山 瑛一, Katayama Eiichi; born November 30, 1991, in Saitama) is a Japanese footballer who plays as a wing back for J1 League club Urawa Red Diamonds.

== Career ==
=== Fagiano Okayama ===
Katayama made his debut for Fagiano against Kataller Toyama on 2 March 2014. He scored his first goal for the club against Oita Trinita on 30 March 2014, scoring in the 85th minute to draw the game.

=== Cerezo Osaka ===
Katayama made his debut for Cerezo against Hokkaido Consadole Sapporo on 2 March 2018. He scored his first goal for the club against Shimizu S-Pulse on 8 July 2020.

Katayama made his debut for Cerezo Osaka II against Blaublitz Akita on 1 December 2019.

=== Shimizu S-Pulse ===
Katayama made his debut for Shimizu against Kashima Antlers on 27 February 2021. He scored his first goal for the club against FC Tokyo on 26 May 2021, scoring in the 49th minute.

=== Kashiwa Reysol ===
Katayama scored on his debut for Kashiwa against Gamba Osaka on 18 February 2023, scoring in the 42nd minute.

=== Urawa Red Diamonds ===
In December 2025, it was announced that Katayama would be joining Urawa Red Diamonds.

== Club statistics ==
As of 23 March 2026.

Appearances and goals by club, season and competition
Club	Season	League			National cup (Note: Includes Emperors Cup)		League cup (Note: Includes J.League Cup)		Continental		Other		Total	
Club	Season	Division	Apps	Goals	Apps	Goals	Apps	Goals	Apps	Goals	Apps	Goals	Apps	Goals
Fagiano Okayama	2014	J.League Division 2	35	6	1	0	–		–		0	0	36	6
Fagiano Okayama	2015	J2 League	40	5	1	1	–		–		0	0	41	6
Fagiano Okayama	2016	J2 League	39	3	3	0	–		–		2 (Note: Appearance in J1/J2 play-offs)	0	44	3
Fagiano Okayama	2017	J2 League	32	1	1	0	–		–		0	0	33	1
Fagiano Okayama	Total		146	15	6	1	0	0	0	0	2	0	154	16
Cerezo Osaka	2018	J1 League	7	0	2	0	1	0	3 (Note: Appearances in AFC Champions League Elite)	1	1 (Note: Appearance in Suruga Bank Championship)	0	14	1
Cerezo Osaka	2019	J1 League	19	0	3	0	5	1	0	0	0	0	27	1
Cerezo Osaka	2020	J1 League	32	1	0	0	3	0	0	0	0	0	35	1
Cerezo Osaka	Total		58	1	5	0	9	1	3	1	1	0	76	3
Cerezo Osaka U-23 (loan)	2019	J3 League	2	0	–		–		–		–		2	0
Shimizu S-Pulse	2021	J1 League	29	2	1	0	4	1	–		–		34	3
Shimizu S-Pulse	2022	J1 League	31	2	0	0	3	0	–		–		34	2
Shimizu S-Pulse	Total		60	4	1	0	7	1	0	0	0	0	68	5
Kashiwa Reysol	2023	J1 League	26	1	3	1	2	0	–		–		31	2
Kashiwa Reysol	2024	J1 League	11	0	2	0	0	0	–		–		13	0
Kashiwa Reysol	2025	J1 League	2	0	0	0	0	0	–		–		2	0
Kashiwa Reysol	Total		39	1	5	1	2	0	0	0	0	0	46	2
Urawa Red Diamonds	2026	J1 (100)	0	0	–		–		–		–		0	0
Career total			305	21	17	2	18	2	3	1	3	0	346	26
