= Lluís Planagumà =

Spanish football manager (born 1980)

Personal information
- Full name: Lluís Planagumà Ramos
- Date of birth: 25 October 1980 (age 46)
- Place of birth: Barcelona, Spain

Managerial career
- Years: Team
- 1999–2010: Espanyol (youth)
- 2010–2011: Pubilla Casas
- 2011: Gramenet B
- 2011: Gramenet
- 2011–2012: Villarreal C
- 2012–2014: Villarreal B
- 2014–2016: Espanyol B
- 2016–2017: Granada B
- 2016: Granada (interim)
- 2017: UCAM Murcia
- 2018–2019: Hércules
- 2020–2021: FC Imabari
- 2022: Vissel Kobe (caretaker)
- 2023: Emirates
- 2024: Atlético Paso
- 2025–2026: FC Helsingør

Lluís Planagumà Ramos (born 25 October 1980) is a Spanish football manager.

== Career ==
Born in Barcelona, Catalonia, Planagumà started his managerial career with RCD Espanyol's youth categories. After eleven seasons in the role, he left the club and joined CE Pubilla Casas.

In December 2011, Planagumà was appointed UDA Gramenet manager in Tercera División, after previously starting the campaign in charge of the B-side. After only two matches in charge he left the club, and moved to fellow league team Villarreal CF C.

In July 2012, Planagumà was confirmed as manager of the reserves in Segunda División B. On 3 June 2014 he returned to his former club Espanyol, being appointed at the helm of the B-team also in the third division.

On 29 June 2016, after rejecting a renewal offer from Espanyol, Planagumà moved to another reserve team, taking over Granada CF's reserves. On 28 September, after Paco Jémez's dismissal, he was named as interim first team manager in La Liga.

Planagumà appeared in his first match as a professional on 1 October 2016, a 0–1 home defeat against newly promoted CD Leganés. He was subsequently replaced by Lucas Alcaraz, and returned to his previous duties.

On 23 June 2017, Planagumà was named manager of UCAM Murcia CF, newly relegated from Segunda División. He was dismissed on 13 November, after 15 games.

Planagumà was appointed at the helm of Hércules CF on 11 June 2018. In his first season in charge, he took the team to the playoff final where they lost 4–1 on aggregate to SD Ponferradina; he was dismissed on 16 September 2019 after taking one point from the first four games of the new campaign.

On 9 January 2020, Planagumà moved abroad for the first time, signing a one-year deal at J3 League club FC Imabari in Japan, under the presidency of former national team manager Takeshi Okada.

On 5 September 2023, Planagumà was appointed as the head coach of UAE Pro League club Emirates. On 21 December 2023, Planagumà was sacked after losing seven consecutive times at the club.

In September 2024, he became manager of Segunda Federación club CD Atlético Paso.

On 11 April 2025, he was named new manager of Danish 2nd Division side FC Helsingør. On 13 January 2026, the club confirmed Planagumà's departure.

== Managerial statistics ==
As of 14 November 2025

Managerial record by team and tenure
Team	Nat	From	To	Record								Ref
Team	Nat	From	To	G	W	D	L	GF	GA	GD	Win %	Ref
Pubilla Casas	(Spain)	1 July 2010	30 June 2011	34	10	14	10	42	43	−1	29.41	
Gramenet B	(Spain)	30 June 2011	1 December 2011	12	4	3	5	17	19	−2	33.33	
Gramenet	(Spain)	1 December 2011	27 December 2011	2	1	0	1	2	1	+1	50.00	
Villarreal C	(Spain)	27 December 2011	4 July 2012	21	9	3	9	46	28	+18	42.86	
Villarreal B	(Spain)	4 July 2012	22 May 2014	78	28	21	29	104	99	+5	35.90	
Espanyol B	(Spain)	3 June 2014	14 June 2016	76	26	23	27	100	87	+13	34.21	
Granada B	(Spain)	29 June 2016	23 June 2017	37	14	11	12	59	46	+13	37.84	
Granada (interim)	(Spain)	28 September 2016	3 October 2016	1	0	0	1	0	1	−1	0.00	
UCAM Murcia	(Spain)	23 June 2017	13 November 2017	15	6	4	5	14	15	−1	40.00	
Hércules	(Spain)	11 June 2018	16 September 2019	48	20	14	14	43	36	+7	41.67	
FC Imabari	(Japan)	9 January 2020	19 May 2021	34	15	10	9	39	27	+12	44.12	
Emirates	(United Arab Emirates)	5 September 2023	21 December 2023	10	1	1	8	9	31	−22	10.00	
Atlético Paso	(Spain)	23 September 2024	26 November 2024	10	1	2	7	6	14	−8	10.00	
FC Helsingør	(Denmark)	11 April 2025	13 January 2026	17	2	1	14	14	37	−23	11.76	
Total				395	137	107	151	495	484	+11	34.68	—
