= Kota Miyamoto =

Japanese footballer

Kota Miyamoto 宮本 航汰
Personal information
- Full name: Kota Miyamoto
- Date of birth: 19 June 1996 (age 30)
- Place of birth: Shizuoka, Japan
- Height: 1.77 m (5 ft 10 in)
- Position: Defensive midfielder

Team information
- Current team: Ehime FC
- Number: 24

Youth career
- Miho FC
- 2010–2014: Shimizu S-Pulse

Senior career*
Years	Team	Apps	(Gls)
2015–2025	Shimizu S-Pulse	120	(2)
2015	→ J. League U-22 (loan)	4	(0)
2016–2017	→ V-Varen Nagasaki (loan)	29	(0)
2018–2019	→ FC Gifu (loan)	66	(2)
2026–	Ehime FC	16	(1)

International career
- Japan U-19
Medal record
Representing Japan
AFC U-16 Championship
Silver medal – second place	2012 Iran
- * Club domestic league appearances and goals as of 17 August 2026

Kota Miyamoto (宮本 航汰, Miyamoto Kōta; born 19 June 1996) is a Japanese professional footballer who plays as a defensive midfielder for Ehime FC in the J3 League.

== Career ==
Born in Shizuoka, Miyamoto made his professional debut for Shimizu S-Pulse on 20 May 2015 in the J.League Cup against Nagoya Grampus. He started the match and played the full match as S-Pulse lost 2–1. After the season, Miyamoto signed with J2 League side V-Varen Nagasaki. He made his debut for the club on 7 May 2016 in the league against Fagiano Okayama. He started the match and played the full match again as V-Varen Nagasaki fell 3–0.

== Career statistics ==
As of match played 10 November 2024.

Appearances and goals by club, season and competition
Club	Season	League			Domestic Cup		League Cup		Continental		Total	
Club	Season	Division	Apps	Goals	Apps	Goals	Apps	Goals	Apps	Goals	Apps	Goals
Shimizu S-Pulse	2015	J1 League	0	0	0	0	1	0	–		1	0
Shimizu S-Pulse	2020	J1 League	10	0	—		2	1	—		12	1
Shimizu S-Pulse	2021	J1 League	18	0	3	0	8	0	—		29	0
Shimizu S-Pulse	2022	J1 League	20	0	1	0	3	0	—		24	0
Shimizu S-Pulse	2023	J2 League	29	0	1	0	5	0	1	0	36	0
Shimizu S-Pulse	2024	J2 League	35	2	0	0	0	0	—		35	2
Shimizu S-Pulse	Total		112	2	5	0	19	1	1	0	137	3
V-Varen Nagasaki (loan)	2016	J2 League	18	0	0	0	—		—		18	0
V-Varen Nagasaki (loan)	2017	J2 League	11	0	1	0	—		—		12	0
V-Varen Nagasaki (loan)	Total		29	0	1	0	—		—		30	0
FC Gifu (loan)	2018	J2 League	41	1	1	0	—		—		42	1
FC Gifu (loan)	2019	J2 League	25	1	0	0	—		—		25	1
FC Gifu (loan)	Total		66	2	1	0	—		—		67	2
Career total			207	4	7	0	19	1	1	0	224	5
