= Yūta Taki =

Japanese footballer

Yūta Taki 滝 裕太
Personal information
- Full name: Yūta Taki
- Date of birth: 29 August 1999 (age 27)
- Place of birth: Shizuoka, Japan
- Height: 1.68 m (5 ft 6 in)
- Position: Winger

Team information
- Current team: Matsumoto Yamaga
- Number: 23

Youth career
- Mishima Nagabuse SSS
- Azul Claro Numazu
- –2017: Shimizu S-Pulse

Senior career*
Years	Team	Apps	(Gls)
2018–2023	Shimizu S-Pulse	33	(3)
2020	→ Kataller Toyama (loan)	13	(0)
2023	→ Matsumoto Yamaga (loan)	32	(3)
2024–	Matsumoto Yamaga	40	(1)
Medal record
Representing Japan
AFC U-19 Championship
Bronze medal – third place	2018 Indonesia
- * Club domestic league appearances and goals as of 1 January 2026

Yūta Taki (滝 裕太, Taki Yūta; born August 29, 1999) is a Japanese football player who plays as a midfielder and currently play for J3 League club, Matsumoto Yamaga.

== Career ==
Yūta Taki joined J1 League club, Shimizu S-Pulse in 2018 after graduation at academy team in 2017. Taki was loaned to Kataller Toyama in 24 August 2020 and loaned again to Matsumoto Yamaga on 30 December 2022.

On 20 December 2023, Matsumoto Yamaga was announce official permanent transfer of Taki has been confirmed from 2025 season after loan.

== Career statistics ==
=== Club ===
As of 20 February 2025.

Appearances and goals by club, season and competition
Club	Season	League			Emperor's Cup		J.League Cup		Total	
Club	Season	Division	Apps	Goals	Apps	Goals	Apps	Goals	Apps	Goals
Shimizu S-Pulse	2017	J1 League	0	0	0	0	2	0	2	0
Shimizu S-Pulse	2018	J1 League	0	0	0	0	4	0	4	0
Shimizu S-Pulse	2019	J1 League	12	2	2	0	5	2	19	4
Shimizu S-Pulse	2020	J1 League	0	0	–		2	0	2	0
Shimizu S-Pulse	2021	J1 League	12	1	2	1	3	0	17	2
Shimizu S-Pulse	2022	J1 League	9	0	2	0	4	1	15	1
Shimizu S-Pulse	Total		33	3	6	1	20	3	59	7
Kataller Toyama (loan)	2020	J3 League	13	0	0	0	–		13	0
Matsumoto Yamaga (loan)	2023	J3 League	32	3	0	0	–		32	3
Matsumoto Yamaga	2024	J3 League	20	0	0	0	2	0	22	0
Matsumoto Yamaga	2025	J3 League	0	0	0	0	0	0	0	0
Matsumoto Yamaga	Total		52	3	0	0	2	0	54	3
Career total			98	3	6	1	22	3	126	10
