= Katsuhiro Nakayama =

Japanese professional footballer

Personal information
- Full name: Katsuhiro Nakayama
- Date of birth: 17 July 1996 (age 30)
- Place of birth: Kanagawa, Japan
- Height: 1.80 m (5 ft 11 in)
- Position: Winger

Team information
- Current team: Nagoya Grampus
- Number: 27

Youth career
- 2003–2008: Yokohama Kawawa FC
- 2009–2011: Yokohama FC
- 2012–2014: Azabu University High School

College career
Years	Team	Apps	(Gls)
2015–2018	Senshu University		

Senior career*
Years	Team	Apps	(Gls)
2019–2020	Yokohama FC	48	(6)
2021–2024	Shimizu S-Pulse	86	(10)
2024–	Nagoya Grampus	78	(0)
- * Club domestic league appearances and goals as of 12 August 2026 ‡ National team caps and goals as of 24 May 2019

Katsuhiro Nakayama (中山 克広, Nakayama Katsuhiro; born 17 July 1996) is a Japanese professional footballer who plays as a winger for J1 League club Nagoya Grampus.

== Honours ==
Nagoya Grampus

- J.League Cup: 2024

Individual

- J1 100 Year Vision League Regional Round West Best Eleven: 2026
