= Togo Umeda =

Japanese footballer

Personal information
- Date of birth: 3 July 2000 (age 26)
- Place of birth: Shizuoka, Japan
- Height: 1.84 m (6 ft 0 in)
- Position: Goalkeeper

Team information
- Current team: Shimizu S-Pulse
- Number: 16

Youth career
- Nagaizumi Amigos
- –2020: Shimizu S-Pulse

Senior career*
Years	Team	Apps	(Gls)
2020–	Shimizu S-Pulse	46	(0)
2021–2022	→ Fagiano Okayama (loan)	28	(0)

International career^{‡}
2017	Japan U17	1	(0)
2018	Japan U18	1	(0)
- * Club domestic league appearances and goals as of 10 August 2026 ‡ National team caps and goals as of 10:01, 4 July 2020 (UTC)

Togo Umeda (梅田 透吾, Umeda Togo; born 3 July 2000) is a Japanese professional footballer currently playing as a goalkeeper for Shimizu S-Pulse.

== Career statistics ==
=== Club ===
As of 3 July 2022.

Appearances and goals by club, season and competition
Club	Season	League			National Cup		League Cup		Other		Total	
Club	Season	Division	Apps	Goals	Apps	Goals	Apps	Goals	Apps	Goals	Apps	Goals
Japan			League		Emperor's Cup		J. League Cup		Other		Total	
Shimizu S-Pulse	2020	J1 League	17	0	0	0	0	0	0	0	17	0
Fagiano Okayama (loan)	2021	J2 League	24	0	1	0	0	0	0	0	25	0
Fagiano Okayama (loan)	2022	J2 League	4	0	0	0	0	0	0	0	4	0
Career total			45	0	1	0	0	0	0	0	46	0
