= Kenta Nishizawa =

Japanese professional footballer (born 1996)

Personal information
- Date of birth: 6 September 1996 (age 30)
- Place of birth: Shizuoka, Japan
- Height: 1.71 m (5 ft 7 in)
- Position: Winger

Team information
- Current team: Sagan Tosu
- Number: 16

Youth career
- Kawahara FC
- Shimizu S-Pulse

College career
Years	Team	Apps	(Gls)
2015–2018	University of Tsukuba		

Senior career*
Years	Team	Apps	(Gls)
2019–2024	Shimizu S-Pulse	136	(17)
2025–	Sagan Tosu	51	(8)
- * Club domestic league appearances and goals as of 14 August 2026

Kenta Nishizawa (西澤 健太, Nishizawa Kenta; born 6 September 1996) is a Japanese professional footballer who plays as a winger for J2 League club Sagan Tosu.
