= Thiago Santana =

Brazilian footballer (born 1993)

Personal information
- Full name: Thiago Santos Santana
- Date of birth: 4 February 1993 (age 33)
- Place of birth: Serrinha, Brazil
- Height: 1.84 m (6 ft 0 in)
- Position: Forward

Team information
- Current team: V-Varen Nagasaki
- Number: 9

Youth career
- 2011–2013: São Carlos
- 2012–2013: → Internacional (loan)

Senior career*
Years	Team	Apps	(Gls)
2011–2016	São Carlos	2	(0)
2014	→ Caxias (loan)	16	(3)
2015	→ Atlético Ibirama (loan)	15	(10)
2015	→ Figueirense (loan)	25	(4)
2016	→ Náutico (loan)	12	(2)
2016–2017	Vitória de Setúbal	18	(0)
2017–2020	Santa Clara	85	(30)
2021–2024	Shimizu S-Pulse	104	(39)
2024–2025	Urawa Red Diamonds	55	(17)
2026–	V-Varen Nagasaki	16	(8)
- * Club domestic league appearances and goals as of 11 August 2026

Thiago Santos Santana (born 4 February 1993), known as Thiago Santana, is a Brazilian professional footballer who plays as a forward for J1 League club, V-Varen Nagasaki.

== Career ==
=== São Carlos ===
Born in Serrinha, Bahia, Thiago Santana began his career with São Carlos, making his senior debuts in 2011 Campeonato Paulista Série A3. In 2012, he moved to Internacional, returning to youth football.

On 13 February 2014, Thiago Santana joined Caxias. On 15 January of the following year he signed for Atlético Ibirama.

Thiago Santana was the club's top scorer in the year's Campeonato Catarinense (the second best overall), with ten goals. On 8 May 2015, he joined Série A club Figueirense.

Thiago Santana made his debut in the main category of Brazilian football on 7 June 2015, starting and scoring the winner in a 2–1 home success over Palmeiras. The following January he was loaned to Náutico of the Campeonato Pernambucano, and was released in June before the Série B season due to a poor scoring rate.

=== Vitória Setúbal ===
On 11 June 2016, Thiago Santana moved abroad for the first time when he signed for Vitória de Setúbal in Portugal's Primeira Liga. In 23 total games, he scored once to open a 2–0 win at Benfica Castelo Branco in the fourth round of the Taça de Portugal on 20 November.

=== Santa Clara ===
In June 2017, Thiago Santana moved to Santa Clara of the LigaPro. He scored 15 times in 33 games in his first season in the Azores as they won promotion as runners-up to Nacional; this put him behind only Ricardo Gomes and compatriot Carlos Vinícius in the overall top scorers. He scored his first goal in Portugal's top flight on 19 August 2018, starting a comeback from 0–3 down at half time to draw at home to Braga.

On 1 April 2019, Thiago Santana signed a new three-year deal with Santa Clara. He scored six times in the upcoming season as they retained their place in the league, including two on 5 June 2020 in a 3–2 home win over Braga, played in Oeiras near Lisbon due to COVID-19 complications.

Thiago Santana scored in a 2–1 home loss to Sporting CP on 24 October 2020. He therefore surpassed Zé Manuel's record of 12 top-flight goals for Santa Clara.

=== Shimizu S-Pulse ===
On 13 December 2020, Thiago Santana moved to Shimizu S-Pulse of the Japanese J1 League, for a fee of €1 million. In February 2021, he scored on his debut in a 1–3 league victory over Kashima Antlers. He scored 14 goals in 40 appearances across all competitions in his debut season with the club.

In his second season, Thiago Santana finished as the league's top scorer, with 14 league goals in 27 appearances. He was also inducted into the season's Best XI at the end of season awards. His performances were not enough to prevent Shimizu from being relegated to the second tier at the end of the 2022 season.

Thiago Santana remained with Shimizu S-Pulse in the J2 League and continued to be an important player, scoring 14 goals in the season and helping the club to a fourth-placed finish. He also scored his first hat-trick for the club in a 9–1 thrashing of Iwaki FC.

=== Urawa Red Diamonds ===
In January 2024, it was announced that Thiago Santana would be moving to J1 League club Urawa Red Diamonds ahead of the 2024 season. He made his debut for the club in a 2–0 defeat to Sanfrecce Hiroshima. He didn't score a goal in his 4 games for the club, but scored in his fifth appearance in a 2–1 win over Avispa Fukuoka, also scoring in the next two games as well. In the match against Albirex he scored again

=== V-Varen Nagasaki ===
On 4 January 2026, Thiago Santana was announcement official signing to J1 League promoted club, V-Varen Nagasaki for 2026 season.

== Career statistics ==
As of the start for 2026 season.

Club	Season	League			State League		Cup		League Cup		Continental		Other		Total	
Club	Season	Division	Apps	Goals	Apps	Goals	Apps	Goals	Apps	Goals	Apps	Goals	Apps	Goals	Apps	Goals
São Carlos	2011	Paulista A3	—		2	0	—		—		—		—		2	0
Caxias (loan)	2014	Série C	16	3	7	3	—		—		—		—		23	6
Atlético Ibirama (loan)	2015	Catarinense	—		15	10	—		—		—		—		15	10
Figueirense (loan)	2015	Série A	25	4	—		5	0	—		—		—		30	4
Náutico (loan)	2016	Série B	—		12	2	2	0	—		—		—		14	2
Vitória de Setúbal	2016–17	Primeira Liga	18	0	—		3	1	3	0	—		–		24	1
Santa Clara	2017–18	LigaPro	33	15	—		4	1	2	1	—		–		39	17
Santa Clara	2018–19	Primeira Liga	10	2	—		0	0	1	1	—		—		11	3
Santa Clara	2019–20	Primeira Liga	33	6	—		3	1	1	0	—		—		37	7
Santa Clara	2020–21	Primeira Liga	9	7	—		1	1	—		—		—		10	8
Santa Clara	Total		85	30	—		8	3	4	2	—		—		97	35
Shimizu S-Pulse	2021	J1 League	37	13	—		1	0	2	1	—		—		40	14
Shimizu S-Pulse	2022	J1 League	27	14	—		2	2	3	0	—		—		32	16
Shimizu S-Pulse	2023	J2 League	38	12	—		0	0	2	1	—		2 (Note: Appearances in the J1/J2 play-off)	1	42	14
Shimizu S-Pulse	Total		102	39	—		3	2	7	2	—		2	1	114	44
Urawa Red Diamonds	2024	J1 League	36	12	—		—		2	1	—		—		38	13
Urawa Red Diamonds	2025	J1 League	19	5	—		2	0	1	0	—		3 (Note: Appearances in FIFA Club World Cup)	0	23	4
Urawa Red Diamonds	Total		55	17	—		2	0	3	1	—		3	0	63	18
V-Varen Nagasaki	2026	J1 League	0	0	—										0	0
V-Varen Nagasaki	2026–27	J1 League	0	0	—		0	0	0	0	—				0	0
V-Varen Nagasaki	Total		0	0	—		0	0	0	0	—				0	0
Career total			294	90	36	15	23	6	17	5	0	0	5	1	373	116

== Honours ==
Individual

- J.League Top Scorer: 2022
- J.League Best XI: 2022
