= Carlinhos Júnior =

Brazilian footballer (born 1994)

Personal information
- Full name: Carlos Antonio de Souza Júnior
- Date of birth: August 8, 1994 (age 32)
- Place of birth: Rio de Janeiro, Brazil
- Height: 1.74 m (5 ft 9 in)
- Positions: Winger; forward

Team information
- Current team: RB Omiya Ardija
- Number: 9

Senior career*
Years	Team	Apps	(Gls)
2013–2015	Paraná	36	(3)
2016–2017	Botafogo–PB	15	(0)
2017–2020	Lugano	90	(29)
2020–2024	Shimizu S-Pulse	142	(35)
2025–2026	JEF United Chiba	44	(14)
2026–	RB Omiya Ardija	1	(0)
- * Club domestic league appearances and goals as of 19:16, 12 August 2026 (UTC)

Carlos Antonio de Souza Júnior (born 8 August 1994), commonly known Carlinhos Júnior, is a Brazilian professional footballer who plays as a winger or forward for J2 League club RB Omiya Ardija.

== Career ==
=== Paraná ===
Carlinhos Júnior went through the youth ranks of Paraná, before being promoted to the first team in 2013. He scored on his league debut against Paranavaí on 3 March 2013, scoring in the 83rd minute.

=== Botafogo–PB ===
Carlinhos Júnior scored his first goal for the club in the Copa do Nordeste, scoring against Sport Recife on 24 March 2016, scoring in the 38th minute. He made his league debut against Cuiabá on 29 May 2016.

=== Lugano ===
Carlinhos Júnior was signed by Swiss club Lugano on 7 January 2017. He made his debut for the club on 4 February as a starter in a 4–0 away loss to FC Basel. He played 78 minutes before being substituted by Ofir Mizrahi. Carlinhos Júnior scored his first goal for Lugano the following week in a 3–0 home win over Grasshoppers. His first six months for Lugano resulted in 16 appearances in which he scored four goals.

Carlinhos Júnior made his European debut on 19 October 2017 in a Europa League group stage match against Czech side Viktoria Plzeň, in which he scored the second goal in a 3–2 home win. His second season in Lugano resulted in 35 appearances across all competitions in which he scored 12 goals, as the club ended in a disappointing ninth place during a close Swiss Super League season.

Carlinhos Júnior has his best season in his third year at the club, with him scoring 14 goals in 33 appearances and Lugano ending in third place which meant qualification to the Europa League.

=== Shimizu S-Pulse ===
On 23 February 2020, Carlinhos Júnior signed a three-year contract with Japanese club Shimizu S-Pulse. He made his league debut against Nagoya Grampus on 4 July 2020. Carlinhos Júnior scored his first league goal against Sagan Tosu on 22 July 2020, scoring in the 19th minute.

== Personal life ==
Carlinhos Júnior gained internet fame as a player for Salford City in the FIFA 20 road-to-glory series by YouTuber Barfieboy. During the series, Carlinhos was commonly referred to as The Patch or El Capitano.

== Career statistics ==
As of 5 November 2022

Appearances and goals by club, season and competition
Club	Season	League			State league (Note: Includes Campeonato Paranaense, Campeonato Paraibano)		National cup (Note: Includes Copa do Brasil, Swiss Cup)		League cup (Note: Includes J.League Cup)		Continental		Other		Total	
Club	Season	Division	Apps	Goals	Apps	Goals	Apps	Goals	Apps	Goals	Apps	Goals	Apps	Goals	Apps	Goals
Paraná	2013	Série B	7	0	12	4	2	1	—		—		—		21	5
Paraná	2014	Série B	18	2	5	0	1	0	—		—		—		24	2
Paraná	2015	Série B	11	1	9	3	1	0	—		—		—		21	4
Paraná	Total		36	3	26	7	4	1	0	0	0	0	0	0	66	11
Botafogo–PB	2016	Série C	15	0	9	0	7	2	—		—		6 (Note: Appearances in Copa do Nordeste)	1	37	3
Lugano	2016–17	Swiss Super League	16	4	—		0	0	—		—		—		16	4
Lugano	2017–18	Swiss Super League	29	10	—		4	2	—		3 (Note: Appearances in UEFA Europa League)	2	—		36	14
Lugano	2018–19	Swiss Super League	31	13	—		3	1	—		—		—		34	14
Lugano	2019–20	Swiss Super League	14	2	—		1	0	—		5	0	—		20	2
Lugano	Total		90	29	0	0	8	3	0	0	8	2	0	0	106	34
Shimizu S-Pulse	2020	J1 League	29	10	—		—		0	0	—		—		29	10
Shimizu S-Pulse	2021	J1 League	21	2	—		0	0	1	0	—		—		22	2
Shimizu S-Pulse	2022	J1 League	22	3	—		0	0	3	0	—		—		25	3
Shimizu S-Pulse	Total		72	15	0	0	0	0	4	0	0	0	0	0	76	15
Career total			213	47	35	7	19	6	4	0	8	2	6	1	286	63

== Honours ==
Botafogo-PB

- Campeonato Paraibano runner-up: 2016
