= Akira Silvano Disaro =

Japanese footballer (born 1996)

Akira Silvano Disaro ディサロ 燦 シルヴァーノ
Personal information
- Full name: Akira Silvano Disaro
- Date of birth: 2 April 1996 (age 30)
- Place of birth: Tokyo, Japan
- Height: 1.75 m (5 ft 9 in)
- Position: Forward

Team information
- Current team: Montedio Yamagata
- Number: 11

Youth career
- Buddy SC
- –2011: SSD Cedratese
- 2012–2014: Mitsubishi Yowa

College career
Years	Team	Apps	(Gls)
2015–2018	Hosei University		

Senior career*
Years	Team	Apps	(Gls)
2019–2020	Giravanz Kitakyushu	63	(25)
2021–2023	Shimizu S-Pulse	44	(4)
2022	→ Montedio Yamagata (loan)	17	(8)
2023–2024	Shonan Bellmare	60	(8)
2024-	Montedio Yamagata	65	(22)
- * Club domestic league appearances and goals as of 13 August 2026

Akira Silvano Disaro (ディサロ 燦 シルヴァーノ, Disaro Akira Shirubāno; born 2 April 1996) is a Japanese professional footballer who plays as a forward for J2 League club, Montedio Yamagata.

== Club career ==
In 2019, Disaro joined J3 League team Giravanz Kitakyushu after playing for Hosei University. He scored on his debut for Giravanz, scoring against FC Tokyo U-23 on the 10 March 2019, scoring in the 10th minute. In his debut season, he scored 16 goals and helped Giaravanz gain promotion to the J2 League. In his second season, Disaro finished with 18 goals and was the second top goal-scorer in the division behind Peter Utaka. During this season, Disaro was awarded the August J.League Monthly MVP award after contributing 6 goals and 2 assists in 6 games.

In December 2020, Disaro moved to J1 League club Shimizu S-Pulse. He made his debut for Shimizu on the 27 February 2021, against Kashima Antlers. He scored his first goal for the club on the 23 June 2021 against Vegalta Sendai, scoring in the 72nd minute. He played one full season at the club, before moving on loan to Montedio Yamagata mid-way through the 2022 season. He made his debut for Montedio against Blaublitz Akita on the 17 July 2022. He scored his first goal for the club on the 30 July 2022, scoring in the 24th minute against Machida Zelvia.

Disaro returned to Shimizu S-Pulse for the 2023 season. Midway through the season he transferred to J1 club Shonan Bellmare. He made his debut for Shonan against Sanfrecce Hiroshima on the 5 August 2023. He scored his first goal for the club on the 12 August 2023, scoring in the 26th minute against Albirex Niigata.

== Personal life ==
Disaro was born in Tokyo, Japan. He is Japanese-Italian, having been born to a Japanese mother and Italian father, and is an Inter fan. Disaro has alopecia universalis, a condition he developed in elementary school.

== Career statistics ==
=== Club ===
As of the end of 2023 season.

Appearances and goals by club, season and competition
Club	Season	League			National cup		League cup		Total	
Club	Season	Division	Apps	Goals	Apps	Goals	Apps	Goals	Apps	Goals
Japan			League		Emperor's Cup		J. League Cup		Total	
Giravanz Kitakyushu	2019	J3 League	26	7	2	0	—		28	7
Giravanz Kitakyushu	2020	J2 League	35	18	0	0	—		35	18
Giravanz Kitakyushu	Total		61	25	2	0	0	0	63	25
Shimizu S-Pulse	2021	J1 League	24	1	2	0	8	1	34	2
Shimizu S-Pulse	2022	J1 League	3	0	2	3	1	0	6	3
Shimizu S-Pulse	2023	J2 League	17	3	1	0	2	0	20	3
Shimizu S-Pulse	Total		27	1	4	3	9	1	60	8
Montedio Yamagata (loan)	2022	J2 League	17	8	0	0	0	0	17	8
Montedio Yamagata (loan)	Total		17	8	0	0	0	0	17	8
Shonan Bellmare	2023	J1 League	4	1	0	0	0	0	4	1
Career total			109	35	6	3	9	1	144	42

== Honours ==
Giravanz Kitakyushu

- J3 League: 2019
