= Shūta Kikuchi =

Japanese footballer

Shūta Kikuchi 菊地 脩太
Personal information
- Full name: Shūta Kikuchi
- Date of birth: 16 August 2003 (age 23)
- Place of birth: Shizuoka, Shizuoka, Japan
- Height: 1.82 m (6 ft 0 in)
- Position: Centre back

Team information
- Current team: Renofa Yamaguchi FC
- Number: 33

Youth career
- 2007–2021: Shimizu S-Pulse

Senior career*
Years	Team	Apps	(Gls)
2021–2025	Shimizu S-Pulse	0	(0)
2022	→ V-Varen Nagasaki (loan)	2	(0)
2024	→ Montedio Yamagata (loan)	2	(0)
2025	→ FC Ryukyu (loan)	38	(0)
2026	FC Ryukyu	19	(0)
2026–	Renofa Yamaguchi FC	2	(0)

International career^{‡}
2018	Japan U15		
2022–2023	Japan U19	2	(0)
2022–2023	Japan U20	10	(0)
- * Club domestic league appearances and goals as of 21 August 2026 ‡ National team caps and goals as of 15 March 2023

Shūta Kikuchi (菊地 脩太, Kikuchi Shūta; born 16 August 2003) is a Japanese footballer who plays as a centre back for Renofa Yamaguchi FC.

== Career ==
On 12 August 2021, Kikuchi was registered to the first team as a type-2 player. Less than a week later, it was announced that Kikuchi would join the Shimizu S-Pulse first team from 2022.

On 22 July 2022, Kikuchi was announced at V-Varen Nagasaki on loan.

On 19 April 2024, Kikuchi was announced at Montedio Yamagata on a one year loan.

On 30 December 2024, Kikuchi was announced at FC Ryukyu on a one year loan.

== International career ==
Kikuchi was called up to the Japan U-20 squad for the 2023 FIFA U-20 World Cup.

== Career statistics ==
=== Club ===
As of 19 August 2021.

Club	Season	League			National Cup		League Cup		Other		Total	
Club	Season	Division	Apps	Goals	Apps	Goals	Apps	Goals	Apps	Goals	Apps	Goals
Shimizu S-Pulse	2021	J1 League	0	0	1 (Note: Appearances in the Emperor's Cup)	0	0	0	0	0	1	0
Career total			0	0	1	0	0	0	0	0	1	0
