= Albert Puig (football manager) =

Spanish football manager

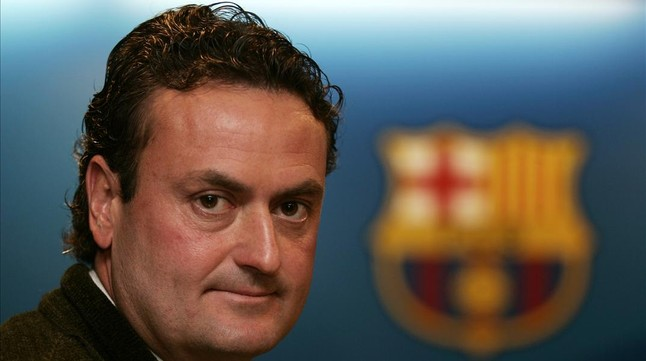

Personal information
- Full name: Albert Puig Ortoneda
- Date of birth: 15 April 1968 (age 58)
- Place of birth: Cambrils, Spain
- Height: 1.70 m (5 ft 7 in)

Managerial career
- Years: Team
- 2001–2003: Reus Deportiu (youth)
- 2005–2010: Barcelona (youth)
- 2018–2019: New York City (assistant)
- 2020–2021: Albirex Niigata
- 2022–2023: FC Tokyo

Albert Puig Ortoneda (born 15 April 1968) is a Spanish professional football manager who was last the manager of J1 League club FC Tokyo.

== Managerial statistics ==
As of 1 April 2023

Managerial record by team and tenure
Team	From	To	Record				
Team	From	To	M	W	D	L	Win %
Albirex Niigata	2020	2021	86	33	29	24	38.4
FC Tokyo	2022	2023	50	19	11	20	38.0
Total			136	52	40	44	38.2
