= Daigo Takahashi =

Japanese footballer

Daigo Takahashi 髙橋 大悟
Personal information
- Full name: Daigo Takahashi
- Date of birth: April 17, 1999 (age 27)
- Place of birth: Kagoshima, Japan
- Height: 1.64 m (5 ft 5 in)
- Position: Winger

Team information
- Current team: Giravanz Kitakyushu
- Number: 66

Youth career
- 2012–2014: Kamimura Gakuen Junior High School
- 2015–2017: Kamimura Gakuen High School

Senior career*
Years	Team	Apps	(Gls)
2018–2022	Shimizu S-Pulse	6	(1)
2019–2021	→ Giravanz Kitakyushu (loan)	97	(26)
2023–2025	FC Machida Zelvia	31	(3)
2024	→ Oita Trinita (loan)	10	(1)
2025	→ Giravanz Kitakyushu (loan)	19	(4)
2026–	Giravanz Kitakyushu	15	(1)
- * Club domestic league appearances and goals as of 24 August 2026

Daigo Takahashi (髙橋 大悟, Takahashi Daigo; born April 17, 1999) is a Japanese football player who plays for Giravanz Kitakyushu.

== Playing career ==
Takahashi was born in Kagoshima Prefecture on April 17, 1999. After graduating from high school, he joined J1 League club Shimizu S-Pulse in 2018.

In August 2019, after a year and a half in Shimizu in which Takahashi only had several times played in J. League Cup matches, he was transferred to Giravanz Kitakyushu in J3 League(promoted to J2 League in the following season) on loan, in which he became one of the key players, eventually played for 98 games, and made 26 goals in 2 years and a half.

Takahashi has been called back to Shimizu after 2021 season.

== Career statistics ==
Last update: 14 January 2022

Appearances and goals by club, season and competition
Club	Season	League			Emperor's Cup		J. League Cup		Total	
Club	Season	Division	Apps	Goals	Apps	Goals	Apps	Goals	Apps	Goals
Shimizu S-Pulse	2018	J1	0	0	0	0	5	0	5	0
Shimizu S-Pulse	2019	J1	0	0	0	0	3	1	3	1
Giravanz Kitakyushu	2019	J3	14	7	0	0	0	0	14	7
Giravanz Kitakyushu	2020	J2	41	9	0	0	0	0	41	9
Giravanz Kitakyushu	2021	J2	42	10	1	0	0	0	43	10
Giravanz Kitakyushu	Total		97	26	1	0	0	0	98	26
Career total			97	26	1	0	8	1	106	27
