= Reon Yamahara =

Japanese footballer

Personal information
- Date of birth: 8 June 1999 (age 27)
- Place of birth: Kyoto, Kyoto, Japan
- Height: 1.65 m (5 ft 5 in)
- Position: Left back

Team information
- Current team: Kawasaki Frontale
- Number: 29

Youth career
- Kyoto Shiko SC
- –2017: JFA Academy Fukushima

College career
Years	Team	Apps	(Gls)
2018–2021	University of Tsukuba		

Senior career*
Years	Team	Apps	(Gls)
2021–2025	Shimizu S-Pulse	123	(7)
2026–	Kawasaki Frontale	20	(1)

International career^{‡}
2014	Japan U16		
2021	Japan U22	1	(0)
- * Club domestic league appearances and goals as of 1 August 2026 ‡ National team caps and goals as of 02:03, 5 June 2022 (UTC)

Reon Yamahara (山原 怜音, Yamahara Reon; born 8 June 1999) is a Japanese footballer currently playing as a left back for J1 League club Kawasaki Frontale.

== Career statistics ==
=== Club ===
As of 5 October 2022.

Club	Season	League			National Cup		League Cup		Other		Total	
Club	Season	Division	Apps	Goals	Apps	Goals	Apps	Goals	Apps	Goals	Apps	Goals
Univ. of Tsukuba	2020	–			5 (Note: Appearances in the Emperor's Cup)	1	–		0	0	5	1
Shimizu S-Pulse	2021	J1 League	5	0	0	0	0	0	0	0	5	0
Shimizu S-Pulse	2022	J1 League	29	2	2	0	5	0	0	0	36	1
Career total			34	2	7	1	5	0	0	0	46	2

== Honours ==
=== Individual ===
- J2 League Best XI: 2024
