= 2022 J1 League =

30th season of J1 League

J1 League
- Season: 2022
- Dates: 18 February – 5 November
- Champions: Yokohama F. Marinos; 5th J1 title 7th Japanese title
- Relegated: Shimizu S-Pulse; Júbilo Iwata
- Champions League: Yokohama F. Marinos; Kawasaki Frontale; Urawa Red Diamonds
- Matches: 306
- Goals: 769 (2.51 per match)
- Top goalscorer: Thiago Santana (14 goals)
- Biggest home win: Sagan Tosu 5–0 Hokkaido Consadole Sapporo (19 March 2022); Sagan Tosu 5–0 FC Tokyo (26 June 2022)
- Biggest away win: Júbilo Iwata 0–6 Urawa Red Diamonds (13 August 2022)
- Highest scoring: Kashiwa Reysol 3–6 FC Tokyo (27 August 2022)
- Longest winning run: 6 matches Yokohama F. Marinos
- Longest unbeaten run: 9 matches Yokohama F. Marinos
- Longest winless run: 11 matches Vissel Kobe
- Longest losing run: 4 matches Gamba Osaka; Júbilo Iwata; Vissel Kobe
- Highest attendance: 56,131; Shimizu S-Pulse 3–5 Yokohama F. Marinos (2 July 2022)
- Lowest attendance: 3,988; Sanfrecce Hiroshima 2–0 Yokohama F. Marinos (6 April 2022)
- Total attendance: 4,384,401
- Average attendance: 14,328

The 2022 J1 League, also known as the 2022 Meiji Yasuda J1 League (Japanese: 2022 明治安田生命J1リーグ, Hepburn: 2022 Meiji Yasuda Seimei J1 Rīgu) for sponsorship reasons, was the 30th season of the J1 League, the top Japanese professional league for association football clubs, since its establishment in 1992. This was eighth season of J1 League as renamed from J. League Division 1.

Kawasaki Frontale were the defending champions, having won their fourth and second consecutive title in 2021 with four rounds to play. Yokohama F. Marinos reclaimed the trophy, winning its fifth J.League and seventh Japanese title on the final day of the season. Brazilian forward Thiago Santana scored 14 goals for Shimizu S-Pulse, the least number of goals from a player who became the league top scorer and the first to also suffer relegation in the same season.

== Overview ==
Due to 2022 FIFA World Cup, the league began from February to November 2022.

== Changes from the previous season ==
There were four teams instead of two relegated last season to 2022 J2 League due to impacts related to the COVID-19 pandemic to made up the decision of no relegation in the 2020 season, which saw the number of teams rise to 20. They were Tokushima Vortis, Oita Trinita, Vegalta Sendai, and Yokohama FC.

Two teams were promoted from the 2021 J2 League: Júbilo Iwata, who won the title and returned to J1 after a two-year absence, and Kyoto Sanga who finished second, returning to J1 after 11 seasons.

== Clubs ==
Locations of the 2022 J1 League teams
2022 J1 League teams in Greater Tokyo Area
2022 J1 League teams in Keihanshin

Club	Location	Stadium	Capacity	Previous season rank
Hokkaido Consadole Sapporo	Hokkaido	Sapporo Dome	41,484	J1 (10th)
Kashima Antlers	Ibaraki Prefecture	Kashima Soccer Stadium	40,728	J1 (4th)
Urawa Red Diamonds	Saitama Prefecture	Saitama Stadium 2002	63,700	J1 (6th)
Kashiwa Reysol	Chiba Prefecture	Hitachi Kashiwa Stadium	15,900	J1 (15th)
FC Tokyo	Tokyo	Ajinomoto Stadium	49,970	J1 (9th)
Yokohama F. Marinos	Kanagawa Prefecture	Nissan Stadium	72,327	J1 (2nd)
Kawasaki Frontale	Kanagawa Prefecture	Todoroki Stadium	26,232	**J1 (1st)**
Shonan Bellmare	Kanagawa Prefecture	Lemon Gas Stadium Hiratsuka	18,500	J1 (16th)
Shimizu S-Pulse	Shizuoka Prefecture	IAI Stadium Nihondaira	20,339	J1 (14th)
Júbilo Iwata	Shizuoka Prefecture	Yamaha Stadium	15,165	↑ J2 (1st)
Nagoya Grampus	Aichi Prefecture	Toyota Stadium	45,000	J1 (5th)
Kyoto Sanga	Kyoto Prefecture	Sanga Stadium by Kyocera	21,600	↑ J2 (2nd)
Gamba Osaka	Osaka Prefecture	Panasonic Stadium Suita	39,694	J1 (13th)
Cerezo Osaka	Osaka Prefecture	Yanmar Stadium	47,853	J1 (12th)
Vissel Kobe	Hyōgo Prefecture	Noevir Stadium	30,132	J1 (3rd)
Sanfrecce Hiroshima	Hiroshima Prefecture	Edion Stadium	36,894	J1 (11th)
Avispa Fukuoka	Fukuoka Prefecture	Best Denki Stadium	21,562	J1 (8th)
Sagan Tosu	Saga Prefecture	Ekimae Real Estate Stadium	24,130	J1 (7th)

=== Personnel and kits ===
Club	Manager	Captain	Kit manufacturer	Main shirt sponsor
Avispa Fukuoka	(Japan) Shigetoshi Hasebe	(Japan) Hiroyuki Mae	(Japan) Yonex	Shin Nihon Seiyaku
Cerezo Osaka	(Japan) Akio Kogiku	(Japan) Hiroshi Kiyotake	(Germany) Puma	Yanmar
FC Tokyo	(Spain) Albert Puig	(Japan) Masato Morishige	(United States) New Balance	Mixi
Gamba Osaka	(Japan) Hiroshi Matsuda	(Japan) Shu Kurata	(England) Umbro	Panasonic
Hokkaido Consadole Sapporo	(Serbia) Mihailo Petrović	(Japan) Hiroki Miyazawa	(Japan) Mizuno	Ishiya
Júbilo Iwata	(Japan) Hiroki Shibuya	(Japan) Kosuke Yamamoto	(England) Admiral	Yamaha
Kashima Antlers	(Japan) Daiki Iwamasa	(Japan) Shoma Doi	(United States) Nike	LIXIL
Kashiwa Reysol	(Brazil) Nelsinho Baptista	(Japan) Hidekazu Otani	(Japan) Yonex	Hitachi
Kawasaki Frontale	(Japan) Toru Oniki	(Japan) Shogo Taniguchi	(Germany) Puma	Fujitsu
Kyoto Sanga	(South Korea) Cho Kwi-jae	(Japan) Temma Matsuda	(Germany) Puma	Kyocera
Nagoya Grampus	(Japan) Kenta Hasegawa	(Japan) Sho Inagaki	(Japan) Mizuno	Toyota
Sagan Tosu	(Japan) Kenta Kawai	(Japan) Naoyuki Fujita	(United States) New Balance	Kimura Information Technology
Sanfrecce Hiroshima	(Germany) Michael Skibbe	(Japan) Sho Sasaki	(United States) Nike	EDION
Shimizu S-Pulse	(Brazil) Zé Ricardo	(Brazil) Valdo	(Germany) Puma	Suzuyo
Shonan Bellmare	(Japan) Satoshi Yamaguchi	(Japan) Kazuki Oiwa	(Brazil) Penalty	Meldia
Urawa Red Diamonds	(Spain) Ricardo Rodriguez	(Japan) Shusaku Nishikawa	(United States) Nike	Polus
Vissel Kobe	(Japan) Takayuki Yoshida	(Spain) Andrés Iniesta	(Japan) Asics	Rakuten
Yokohama F. Marinos	(Australia) Kevin Muscat	(Japan) Takuya Kida	(Germany) Adidas	Nissan

=== Managerial changes ===
Team	Outgoing manager	Manner of departure	Date of vacancy	Position in the table	Incoming manager	Date of appointment
Sanfrecce Hiroshima	(Japan) Kentaro Sawada	End of interim spell	5 December 2021	Pre-season	(Germany) Michael Skibbe	25 November 2021
Gamba Osaka	(Japan) Masanobu Matsunami	End of interim spell	5 December 2021	Pre-season	(Japan) Tomohiro Katanosaka	23 December 2021
Kashima Antlers	(Japan) Naoki Soma	End of contract	5 December 2021	Pre-season	(Switzerland) René Weiler	10 December 2021
FC Tokyo	(Japan) Shinichi Morishita	End of interim spell	5 December 2021	Pre-season	(Spain) Albert Puig	10 December 2021
Nagoya Grampus	(Italy) Massimo Ficcadenti	End of contract	9 December 2021	Pre-season	(Japan) Kenta Hasegawa	9 December 2021
Sagan Tosu	(South Korea) Kim Myung-hwi	Resigned	20 December 2021	Pre-season	(Japan) Kenta Kawai	24 December 2021
Júbilo Iwata	(Japan) Masakazu Suzuki	Resigned	25 December 2021	Pre-season	(Japan) Akira Ito	25 December 2021
Vissel Kobe	(Japan) Atsuhiro Miura	Sacked	20 March 2022	16th	(Spain) Lluís Planagumà (caretaker)	21 March 2022
Vissel Kobe	(Spain) Lluís Planagumà	End of caretaker spell	8 April 2022	17th	(Spain) Miguel Ángel Lotina	8 April 2022
Shimizu S-Pulse	(Japan) Hiroaki Hiraoka	Sacked	30 May 2022	16th	(Japan) Yoshiyuki Shinoda (caretaker)	30 May 2022
Shimizu S-Pulse	(Japan) Yoshiyuki Shinoda	End of caretaker spell	7 June 2022	16th	(Brazil) Zé Ricardo	7 June 2022
Vissel Kobe	(Spain) Miguel Ángel Lotina	Sacked	29 June 2022	18th	(Japan) Takayuki Yoshida	29 June 2022
Kashima Antlers	(Switzerland) René Weiler	Mutual consent	7 August 2022	4th	(Japan) Daiki Iwamasa	8 August 2022
Gamba Osaka	(Japan) Tomohiro Katanosaka	Sacked	17 August 2022	17th	(Japan) Hiroshi Matsuda	17 August 2022
Júbilo Iwata	(Japan) Akira Ito	Sacked	17 August 2022	18th	(Japan) Hiroki Shibuya	17 August 2022

=== Foreign players ===
From the 2021 season, there is no limitations on signing foreign players, but clubs could only register up to five of them for a single matchday squad. Players from J.League partner nations (Thailand, Vietnam, Myanmar, Malaysia, Cambodia, Singapore, Indonesia, and Qatar) were exempted from these restrictions.

- Players name in **bold** indicates the player is registered during the midseason transfer window.
- Player's name in italics indicates the player has Japanese nationality in addition to their FIFA nationality, holds the nationality of a J.League partner nation, or is exempt from being treated as a foreign player due to having been born in Japan and being enrolled in, or having graduated from an approved type of school in the country.

Club	Player 1	Player 2	Player 3	Player 4	Player 5	Player 6	Player 7	Player 8	Former player (s)
Avispa Fukuoka	(Belgium) Jordy Croux	(Brazil) Douglas Grolli	(Brazil) Lukian	(Cameroon) **John Mary**	(Spain) Juanma				
Cerezo Osaka	(Australia) Adam Taggart	(Brazil) Bruno Mendes	(Brazil) Jean Patric	(Croatia) Matej Jonjić	(South Korea) Kim Jin-hyeon	(Thailand) **Chaowat Veerachat**			(Vietnam) Đặng Văn Lâm
FC Tokyo	(Brazil) Adaílton	(Brazil) Diego Oliveira	(Brazil) Henrique Trevisan	(Brazil) Leandro	(Brazil) **Luiz Phellype**	(Poland) Jakub Słowik			(Brazil) Bruno Uvini
Gamba Osaka	(Brazil) Dawhan	(Brazil) **Juan Alano**	(Brazil) Leandro Pereira	(Brazil) Patric	(Brazil) Wellington Silva	(South Korea) Kwon Kyung-won			(South Korea) Ju Se-jong (South Korea) Shin Won-ho
Hokkaido Consadole Sapporo	(Brazil) Douglas Oliveira	(Brazil) Gabriel Xavier	(Brazil) Lucas Fernandes	(Slovenia) Milan Tučić	(South Korea) **Kim Gun-hee**	(Thailand) **Supachok Sarachat**			
Júbilo Iwata	(Brazil) Dudu Pacheco	(Brazil) Ricardo Graça	(Colombia) Fabián González	(Moldova) Alexei Koșelev					
Kashima Antlers	(Brazil) Arthur Caíke	(Brazil) Bueno	(Brazil) Diego Pituca	(Brazil) Everaldo	(Nigeria) **Blessing Eleke**	(South Korea) Kim Min-tae	(South Korea) Kwoun Sun-tae		(Brazil) Juan Alano
Kashiwa Reysol	(Brazil) Dodi	(Brazil) Douglas	(Brazil) Matheus Sávio	(Brazil) Rodrigo Angelotti					(Brazil) Emerson Santos (South Korea) Kim Seung-gyu
Kawasaki Frontale	(Brazil) Jesiel	(Brazil) João Schmidt	(Brazil) Leandro Damião	(Brazil) Marcinho	(South Korea) Jung Sung-ryong	(Thailand) Chanathip Songkrasin			
Kyoto Sanga	(Brazil) **Alan Cariús**	(Brazil) Mendes	(Brazil) **Paulinho Bóia**	(Curaçao) Quenten Martinus	(New Zealand) Michael Woud	(Nigeria) Origbaajo Ismaila	(Nigeria) Peter Utaka		
Nagoya Grampus	(Australia) Mitchell Langerak	(Brazil) Léo Silva	(Brazil) Mateus	(Brazil) **Naldinho**	(Brazil) Tiago Pagnussat	(Poland) Jakub Świerczok			
Sagan Tosu	(Brazil) Diego	(South Korea) Hwang Seok-ho	(South Korea) Park Il-gyu	(South Korea) **Park Keon-woo**	(South Korea) Ueom Ye-hoon				(Lebanon) Joan Oumari (South Korea) Taiga Son
Sanfrecce Hiroshima	(Brazil) Douglas Vieira	(Brazil) Ezequiel	(Cyprus) **Pieros Sotiriou**	(Switzerland) **Nassim Ben Khalifa**					(Brazil) Júnior Santos
Shimizu S-Pulse	(Brazil) Carlinhos Júnior	(Brazil) Renato Augusto	(Brazil) Ronaldo	(Brazil) Thiago Santana	(Brazil) Valdo	(Brazil) **Yago Pikachu**	(Kosovo) Benjamin Kololli	(South Korea) Oh Se-hun	
Shonan Bellmare	(Brazil) Wellington	(Nigeria) **Mikel Agu**	(Norway) Tarik Elyounoussi						
Urawa Red Diamonds	(Denmark) Alexander Scholz	(Denmark) Kasper Junker	(Netherlands) **Alex Schalk**	(Netherlands) **Bryan Linssen**	(Sweden) David Moberg Karlsson				
Vissel Kobe	(Brazil) **Matheus Thuler**	(Montenegro) **Stefan Mugoša**	(Spain) Andrés Iniesta	(Spain) Bojan Krkić	(Spain) Sergi Samper				(Brazil) Lincoln
Yokohama F. Marinos	(Brazil) Anderson Lopes	(Brazil) Eduardo	(Brazil) Élber	(Brazil) Léo Ceará	(Brazil) Marcos Júnior	(Brazil) **Yan Matheus**			

== League table ==
Pos	Team	Pld	W	D	L	GF	GA	GD	Pts	Qualification or relegation
1	Yokohama F. Marinos (C)	34	20	8	6	70	35	+35	68	Qualification for the AFC Champions League group stage
2	Kawasaki Frontale	34	20	6	8	65	42	+23	66	Qualification for the AFC Champions League group stage
3	Sanfrecce Hiroshima	34	15	10	9	52	41	+11	55	
4	Kashima Antlers	34	13	13	8	47	42	+5	52	
5	Cerezo Osaka	34	13	12	9	46	40	+6	51	
6	FC Tokyo	34	14	7	13	46	43	+3	49	
7	Kashiwa Reysol	34	13	8	13	43	44	−1	47	
8	Nagoya Grampus	34	11	13	10	30	35	−5	46	
9	Urawa Red Diamonds	34	10	15	9	48	39	+9	45	Qualification for the AFC Champions League play-off round (Note: Urawa Red Diamonds won the Champions League but did not qualify for the Champions League via league position. As a result, the last spot distributed to the third-placed team was transferred to Urawa Red Diamonds pursuant to the rules that Champions League winners would guaranteed a Champions League spot.)
10	Hokkaido Consadole Sapporo	34	11	12	11	45	55	−10	45	
11	Sagan Tosu	34	9	15	10	45	44	+1	42	
12	Shonan Bellmare	34	10	11	13	31	39	−8	41	
13	Vissel Kobe	34	11	7	16	35	41	−6	40	
14	Avispa Fukuoka	34	9	11	14	29	38	−9	38	
15	Gamba Osaka	34	9	10	15	33	44	−11	37	
16	Kyoto Sanga (O)	34	8	12	14	30	38	−8	36	Qualification for relegation playoffs
17	Shimizu S-Pulse (R)	34	7	12	15	44	54	−10	33	Relegation to the J2 League
18	Júbilo Iwata (R)	34	6	12	16	32	57	−25	30	Relegation to the J2 League

Source: J.League Data Site
Rules for classification: 1) Points; 2) Goal difference; 3) Goals scored; 4) Head-to-head points; 5) Head-to-head goal difference; 6) Head-to-head goals scored; 7) Fewer disciplinary points.
(C) Champions; (O) Play-off winners; (R) Relegated

== Results table ==
Home \ Away	ANT	AVI	BEL	CER	CON	FMA	FRO	GAM	GRA	JBI	KSA	RED	REY	SAG	SFR	SSP	TOK	VIS
Kashima Antlers	—	2–0	2–1	3–3	4–1	0–3	0–2	0–0	0–0	3–1	1–0	2–2	1–0	4–4	0–2	2–1	0–1	1–1
Avispa Fukuoka	0–1	—	0–0	0–0	0–0	1–0	1–4	0–1	2–3	1–1	1–0	0–0	2–1	0–0	1–3	3–2	5–1	0–1
Shonan Bellmare	1–1	0–0	—	0–2	1–5	1–4	2–1	1–0	0–0	0–0	1–1	0–0	0–2	3–0	0–1	1–4	2–0	2–1
Cerezo Osaka	0–3	2–0	1–1	—	2–2	2–2	2–1	3–1	0–1	2–1	1–1	2–0	0–1	2–1	0–3	1–1	0–1	3–0
Hokkaido Consadole Sapporo	0–0	1–2	1–0	2–1	—	1–1	4–3	1–0	2–2	4–0	1–0	1–1	1–6	1–2	1–1	4–3	0–0	0–2
Yokohama F. Marinos	2–0	1–0	3–0	2–2	0–0	—	4–2	0–2	2–1	0–1	2–0	4–1	4–0	0–0	3–0	2–0	2–1	2–0
Kawasaki Frontale	2–1	2–0	0–4	1–4	5–2	2–1	—	4–0	1–0	1–1	3–1	2–1	1–0	4–0	4–0	3–2	1–0	2–1
Gamba Osaka	1–3	2–3	0–1	1–2	0–0	1–2	2–2	—	3–1	2–0	1–1	1–1	0–0	0–3	2–0	0–2	0–0	2–0
Nagoya Grampus	1–1	1–0	2–1	1–0	0–2	0–4	1–1	0–2	—	1–0	1–1	3–0	1–1	1–1	0–0	0–2	2–1	2–0
Júbilo Iwata	3–3	0–1	1–0	2–2	1–2	0–2	1–1	1–1	2–1	—	0–0	0–6	2–2	3–1	2–2	1–2	2–1	0–1
Kyoto Sanga	1–1	0–1	0–1	0–0	2–1	1–2	1–0	1–1	1–1	1–4	—	1–0	1–2	3–1	1–1	0–0	0–1	2–0
Urawa Red Diamonds	1–1	1–1	2–0	0–1	1–1	3–3	3–1	0–1	3–0	4–1	2–2	—	4–1	2–1	0–0	1–1	3–0	2–2
Kashiwa Reysol	1–2	1–0	1–2	0–0	1–0	3–1	1–1	0–1	0–1	2–0	0–2	0–0	—	1–4	2–3	3–1	3–6	3–1
Sagan Tosu	1–1	1–1	1–1	1–1	5–0	2–2	0–0	2–1	0–0	2–0	0–1	1–0	0–1	—	2–2	0–0	5–0	0–2
Sanfrecce Hiroshima	3–0	1–0	1–1	2–1	1–2	2–0	0–2	5–2	1–0	3–0	3–1	4–1	1–2	0–0	—	2–0	1–2	1–1
Shimizu S-Pulse	0–1	3–1	1–1	1–3	1–1	3–5	0–2	1–1	1–2	1–1	1–0	1–2	1–1	3–3	2–2	—	0–3	0–0
FC Tokyo	3–1	2–2	0–2	4–0	3–0	2–2	2–3	2–0	0–0	2–0	2–0	0–0	0–0	0–1	2–1	0–2	—	3–1
Vissel Kobe	0–2	0–0	1–0	0–1	4–1	1–3	0–1	2–1	0–0	0–0	1–3	0–1	0–1	4–0	4–0	2–1	2–1	—

Source: J1 League
Legend: Blue = home team win; Yellow = draw; Red = away team win.

== Promotion–relegation playoffs ==
In the playoffs, officially called the 2022 J.League J1/J2 Play-offs (Japanese: 2022 J1参入プレーオフ), the 16th-placed team of the J1 League (Kyoto Sanga) faced the winners of the J2 League promotion playoffs. Should they lose, the J2 team would be promoted in their place for the 2023 J1 League. Fagiano Okayama, Roasso Kumamoto, Oita Trinita, and Montedio Yamagata qualified for the promotion playoffs as they finished between third and sixth in the 2022 J2 League.

In the first two rounds of the playoffs, if the score was tied after 90 minutes, no extra time was played and the winners were the team with the higher finish in the J2 League (i.e. the home team). In the final match at the J1 team's home, if the score was tied after 90 minutes, no extra time would be played, and both teams stay at their respective leagues.

First round 30 October
J2 (3)	Fagiano Okayama	0
J2 (6)	Montedio Yamagata	3
J2 (4)	Roasso Kumamoto	2
J2 (5)	Oita Trinita	2

Second round 6 November
J2 (6)	Montedio Yamagata	2
J2 (4)	Roasso Kumamoto	2

Final; 13 November
J1 (16)	Kyoto Sanga	1
J2 (4)	Roasso Kumamoto	1

=== First round ===
30 October 2022	Roasso Kumamoto	2–2	Oita Trinita	Kumamoto
13:07	Sakamoto 87'; Aihara 90+2'	Report (EN); Report (JA)	Isa 1'; Pereira 90+8'	Stadium: Egao Kenko Stadium; Attendance: 13,818; Referee: Koichiro Fukushima

30 October 2022	Fagiano Okayama	0–3	Montedio Yamagata	Okayama
14:03		Report (EN); Report (JA)	Disaro 5'; Dellatorre 75'; Alves 80'	Stadium: City Light Stadium; Attendance: 11,854; Referee: Hayato Shimizu

=== Second round ===
6 November 2022	Roasso Kumamoto	2–2	Montedio Yamagata	Kumamoto
13:09	Iyoha 12'; Sugiyama 50' (pen.)	Report (EN); Report (JA)	Yamada 17'; Minami 24'	Stadium: Egao Kenko Stadium; Attendance: 11,429; Referee: Jumpei Iida

=== Final ===
13 November 2022	Kyoto Sanga	1–1	Roasso Kumamoto	Kameoka
13:06	Toyokawa 39'	Report (EN); Report (JA)	Iyoha 68'	Stadium: Sanga Stadium by Kyocera; Attendance: 18,207; Referee: Ryuji Sato

Kyoto Sanga remained in J1 League. Roasso Kumamoto remained in J2 League.

== Season statistics ==
=== Scoring ===
==== Top scorers ====
Rank	Player	Club	Goals
1	(Brazil) Thiago Santana	Shimizu S-Pulse	14
2	(Japan) Shuto Machino	Shonan Bellmare	13
3	(Brazil) Adaílton	FC Tokyo	12
3	(Brazil) Marcinho	Kawasaki Frontale	12
3	(Japan) Akihiro Ienaga	Kawasaki Frontale	12
6	(Brazil) Anderson Lopes	Yokohama F. Marinos	11
6	(Brazil) Léo Ceará	Yokohama F. Marinos	11
8	(Japan) Ayase Ueda	Kashima Antlers	10
8	(Japan) Takuma Nishimura	Yokohama F. Marinos	10
8	(Japan) Yuya Yamagishi	Avispa Fukuoka	10

==== Hat-tricks ====
Player	For	Against	Result	Date
(Denmark) Kasper Junker	Urawa Red Diamonds	Yokohama F. Marinos	3–3 (H)	18 May 2022
(Brazil) Léo Ceará	Yokohama F. Marinos	Shimizu S-Pulse	5–3 (A)	2 July 2022
(Brazil) Marcinho	Kawasaki Frontale	Avispa Fukuoka	4–1 (A)	20 August 2022
(Japan) Ryoma Watanabe	FC Tokyo	Cerezo Osaka	4–0 (H)	12 October 2022

==== Top assists ====
Rank	Player	Club	Assists
1	(Japan) Yasuto Wakizaka	Kawasaki Frontale	10
1	(Japan) Yuma Suzuki	Kashima Antlers	10
3	(Japan) Gakuto Notsuda	Sanfrecce Hiroshima	8
3	(Japan) Makoto Mitsuta	Sanfrecce Hiroshima	8
3	(Japan) Yuta Higuchi	Kashima Antlers	8
6	(Japan) Akito Fukuta	Sagan Tosu	7
6	(Japan) Reon Yamahara	Shimizu S-Pulse	7
8	(Brazil) Anderson Lopes	Yokohama F. Marinos	6
8	(Brazil) Carlinhos Júnior	Shimizu S-Pulse	6
8	(Brazil) Marcinho	Kawasaki Frontale	6
8	(Brazil) Thiago Santana	Shimizu S-Pulse	6
8	(Japan) Ken Iwao	Urawa Red Diamonds	6
8	(Japan) Kota Mizunuma	Yokohama F. Marinos	6
8	(Japan) Teruhito Nakagawa	Yokohama F. Marinos	6
8	(Japan) Tomoya Koyamatsu	Kashiwa Reysol	6

=== Clean sheets ===
Rank	Player	Club	Clean sheets
1	(Poland) Jakub Słowik	FC Tokyo	14
2	(Australia) Mitchell Langerak	Nagoya Grampus	13
2	(Japan) Yohei Takaoka	Yokohama F. Marinos	13
4	(South Korea) Jung Sung-ryong	Kawasaki Frontale	12
4	(South Korea) Park Il-gyu	Sagan Tosu	12
6	(Japan) Keisuke Osako	Sanfrecce Hiroshima	11
7	(Japan) Kosei Tani	Shonan Bellmare	10
7	(Japan) Shusaku Nishikawa	Urawa Red Diamonds	10
7	(Japan) Takanori Sugeno	Hokkaido Consadole Sapporo	10
10	(South Korea) Kim Jin-hyeon	Cerezo Osaka	9

=== Discipline ===
==== Player ====
- Most yellow cards: 7
  - (Brazil) Diego Pituca (Kashima Antlers)
  - (Brazil) Dodi (Kashiwa Reysol)
  - (Japan) Hisashi Appiah Tawiah (Kyoto Sanga)
  - (Japan) Yuji Takahashi (Kashiwa Reysol)
  - (Spain) Juanma (Avispa Fukuoka)
- Most red cards: 1
  - 44 players

==== Club ====
- Most yellow cards: 54
  - Kashiwa Reysol
- Most red cards: 4
  - Hokkaido Consadole Sapporo
  - Júbilo Iwata
  - Shonan Bellmare

== Awards ==
=== Monthly awards ===
Month	Manager of the Month		Monthly MVP		Goal of the Month		References
Month	Manager	Club	Player	Club	Player	Club	References
February/March	(Japan) Toru Oniki	Kawasaki Frontale	(Japan) Ayase Ueda	Kashima Antlers	(Japan) Yuki Saneto	Yokohama F. Marinos	
April	(Germany) Michael Skibbe	Sanfrecce Hiroshima	(Nigeria) Peter Utaka	Kyoto Sanga	(Brazil) Dawhan	Gamba Osaka	
May	(Australia) Kevin Muscat	Yokohama F. Marinos	(Japan) Seiya Maikuma	Cerezo Osaka	(Brazil) Matheus Sávio	Kashiwa Reysol	
June	(Japan) Satoshi Yamaguchi	Shonan Bellmare	(Japan) Kota Mizunuma	Yokohama F. Marinos	(Japan) Gakuto Notsuda	Sanfrecce Hiroshima	
July	(Australia) Kevin Muscat	Yokohama F. Marinos	(Brazil) Léo Ceará	Yokohama F. Marinos	(Brazil) Everaldo	Kashima Antlers	
August	(Germany) Michael Skibbe	Sanfrecce Hiroshima	(Japan) Akihiro Ienaga	Kawasaki Frontale	(Brazil) Mateus	Nagoya Grampus	
September	(Australia) Kevin Muscat	Yokohama F. Marinos	(Japan) Tomoki Iwata	Yokohama F. Marinos	(Japan) Takumu Kawamura	Sanfrecce Hiroshima	
October/November	(Japan) Toru Oniki	Kawasaki Frontale	(Brazil) Marcinho	Kawasaki Frontale	(Japan) Yuki Kobayashi	Vissel Kobe	

=== Annual awards ===
Award	Winner	Club
Manager of the Year	(Germany) Michael Skibbe	Sanfrecce Hiroshima
Player of the Year	(Japan) Tomoki Iwata	Yokohama F. Marinos
Best Young Player	(Japan) Mao Hosoya	Kashiwa Reysol
Goal of the Year	(Japan) Takumu Kawamura	Sanfrecce Hiroshima

Best XI
Goalkeeper	(Japan) Yohei Takaoka (Yokohama F. Marinos)			
Defenders	(Japan) Shogo Taniguchi (Kawasaki Frontale)	(Japan) Miki Yamane (Kawasaki Frontale)	(Japan) Tomoki Iwata (Yokohama F. Marinos)	(Japan) Ryuta Koike (Yokohama F. Marinos)
Midfielders	(Japan) Akihiro Ienaga (Kawasaki Frontale)		(Japan) Yasuto Wakizaka (Kawasaki Frontale)	(Japan) Kota Mizunuma (Yokohama F. Marinos)
Forwards	(Brazil) Marcinho (Kawasaki Frontale)		(Brazil) Élber (Yokohama F. Marinos)	(Brazil) Thiago Santana (Shimizu S-Pulse)

== See also ==
- Japan Football Association (JFA)
- 2022–23 WE League season
- 2022 Gamba Osaka season
- 2022 Júbilo Iwata season
- 2022 Kashima Antlers season
- 2022 Kawasaki Frontale season
- 2022 Shimizu S-Pulse season
- 2022 Urawa Red Diamonds season
- 2022 Yokohama F. Marinos season
