= 2020 Cerezo Osaka season =

Cerezo Osaka
2020 season
- Owner: Yanmar
- Chairman: Hiroaki Morishima
- Manager: Miguel Ángel Lotina
- Stadium: Yanmar Stadium Nagai
- J1 League: 4th
- Emperor's Cup: Preseason
- J.League Cup: Group stage
- Top goalscorer: League: Hiroaki Okuno (2); All: Bruno Mendes (3)
Home colours	Away colours

The 2020 season was Cerezo Osaka's fourth consecutive season in the top-division of Japanese football following promotion in 2016. In addition to the J1 League, the club also competed in the 2020 Emperor's Cup and the 2020 J.League Cup.

== Squad ==
=== Senior team ===
As of 23 February 2020. Note: Flags indicate national team as defined under FIFA eligibility rules; some limited exceptions apply. Players may hold more than one non-FIFA nationality.

No.	Pos.	Nation	Player
1	GK	JPN	Takumi Nagaishi
2	DF	JPN	Riku Matsuda
3	DF	JPN	Yasuki Kimoto
4	DF	JPN	Yuta Koike
5	MF	JPN	Naoyuki Fujita
6	MF	ARG	Leandro Desábato
8	FW	JPN	Yoichiro Kakitani
9	FW	JPN	Ken Tokura
10	MF	JPN	Hiroshi Kiyotake
11	MF	BRA	Lucas Mineiro (on loan from Chapecoense)
13	FW	JPN	Toshiyuki Takagi
14	DF	JPN	Yusuke Maruhashi
15	DF	JPN	Ayumu Seko
16	DF	JPN	Eiichi Katayama
17	MF	JPN	Tatsuhiro Sakamoto
18	FW	JPN	Koji Suzuki
19	FW	JPN	Ryuji Sawakami
20	FW	BRA	Bruno Mendes
21	GK	KOR	Kim Jin-hyeon
22	DF	CRO	Matej Jonjić
24	FW	AUS	Pierce Waring

No.	Pos.	Nation	Player
25	MF	JPN	Hiroaki Okuno
26	MF	JPN	Daichi Akiyama
27	GK	KOR	Ahn Joon-soo
28	FW	JPN	Motohiko Nakajima
29	MF	JPN	Takuya Shimamura (on loan from Kyoto Sanga)
30	MF	JPN	Hinata Kida
31	FW	JPN	Hirofumi Yamauchi
32	FW	JPN	Yuta Toyokawa
33	FW	THA	Tawan Khotrsupho (on loan from BG Pathum United)
38	MF	JPN	Masataka Nishimoto
39	DF	JPN	Honoya Shoji
40	FW	JPN	Mizuki Ando
41	MF	JPN	Nagi Matsumoto
42	FW	JPN	Shota Fujio
43	DF	JPN	Ryuya Nishio
44	MF	JPN	Takaya Yoshinare
45	GK	JPN	Shu Mogi
46	DF	JPN	Tatsuya Tabira
47	MF	JPN	Taiga Maekawa
49	MF	JPN	Jun Nishikawa

=== Out on loan ===
Last updated 11 July 2019.

Note: Flags indicate national team as defined under FIFA eligibility rules; some limited exceptions apply. Players may hold more than one non-FIFA nationality.

No.	Pos.	Nation	Player
17	MF	JPN	Takaki Fukumitsu (to Mito HollyHock)
26	MF	JPN	Daichi Akiyama (to Montedio Yamagata)
31	FW	JPN	Towa Yamane (to Zweigen Kanazawa)
—	GK	KOR	Ahn Joon-soo (to Kagoshima United FC)
—	GK	JPN	Takumi Nagaishi (to Renofa Yamaguchi FC)
—	GK	JPN	Honoya Shoji (to Oita Trinita)

No.	Pos.	Nation	Player
—	DF	JPN	Reiya Morishita (to Tochigi SC)
—	MF	JPN	Hinata Kida (to Avispa Fukuoka)
—	MF	JPN	Taiga Maekawa (to Avispa Fukuoka)
—	MF	JPN	Hirofumi Yamauchi (to FC Machida Zelvia)
—	FW	JPN	Takeru Kishimoto (to Tokushima Vortis)

=== Under-23 Squad ===
Note: Flags indicate national team as defined under FIFA eligibility rules; some limited exceptions apply. Players may hold more than one non-FIFA nationality.

No.	Pos.	Nation	Player
33	FW	THA	Tawan Khotrsupho (on loan from BG Pathum United)
35	MF	THA	Phongrawit Jantawong (on loan from BG Pathum United)
37	DF	JPN	Temma Nomura
41	MF	JPN	Nagi Matsumoto
42	FW	JPN	Shota Fujio
43	DF	JPN	Ryuya Nishio

No.	Pos.	Nation	Player
44	DF	JPN	Taiyo Shimokawa
46	GK	JPN	Teruki Origuchi
47	GK	JPN	Go Kambayashi
48	MF	JPN	Takaya Yoshinare
49	DF	JPN	Kaito Hayashida
50	MF	JPN	Riyon Tori

== Competitions ==
=== J1 League ===
==== Table ====
Pos	Team	Pld	W	D	L	GF	GA	GD	Pts	Qualification or relegation
2	Gamba Osaka	34	20	5	9	46	42	+4	65	Qualification for AFC Champions League group stage (Note: Since the winners of the 2020 Emperor's Cup, Kawasaki Frontale, qualified for the Champions League group stage, the spot given to the Emperor's Cup winners (Champions League group stage) was passed to the third-placed team and the spot given to the third-place team (Champions League play-off round) was passed to the fourth-placed team.)
3	Nagoya Grampus	34	19	6	9	45	28	+17	63	Qualification for AFC Champions League group stage
4	Cerezo Osaka	34	18	6	10	46	37	+9	60	Qualification for AFC Champions League play-off round
5	Kashima Antlers	34	18	5	11	55	44	+11	59	
6	FC Tokyo	34	17	6	11	47	42	+5	57	

Source: Meiji Yasuda J1 League
Rules for classification: 1) Points; 2) Goal difference; 3) Head-to-head points; 4) Head-to-head goal difference; 5) Head-to-head goal scored; 6) Number of wins; 7) Goals scored; 8) Fair-play points.

==== Results summary ====
Overall								Home						Away					
Pld	W	D	L	GF	GA	GD	Pts	W	D	L	GF	GA	GD	W	D	L	GF	GA	GD
34	18	6	10	46	37	+9	60	8	4	5	20	13	+7	10	2	5	26	24	+2

Source: see below

==== Results by matchday ====
Round	1	2	3	4	5	6	7	8	9	10	11	12	13	14	15	16	17	18	19	20	21	22	23	24	25	26	27	28	29	30	31	32	33	34
Ground	H	A	H	H	A	H	A	A	H	A	A	H	A	H	H	A	A	H	A	A	H	A	H	H	A	H	A	H	A	H	A	H	H	A
Result	W	W	W	L	W	D	D	W	D	W	L	W	W	W	W	W	W	L	L	W	L	L	W	W	L	D	L	L	W	W	W	D	L	D
Position	6	3	1	3	3	5	4	3	3	2	2	2	2	2	2	2	2	2	2	2	2	2	2	2	4	4	4	4	4	4	4	4	4	4

Source: See below
A = Away; H = Home; W = Win; D = Draw; L = Loss

==== Matches ====
22 February 2020 1	Cerezo Osaka	1–0	Oita Trinita	Osaka
15:03 JST	Bruno Mendes 8'	Report		Stadium: Yanmar Stadium; Attendance: 15,535

4 July 2020 2	Gamba Osaka	1–2	Cerezo Osaka	Suita
18:03 JST	Ademilson 68'	Report	Okuno 45+2'; Maruhashi 62'; Kimoto (yellow card) 66'	Stadium: Panasonic Stadium; Attendance: 0 (Note: Match played behind closed doors)

8 July 2020 3	Cerezo Osaka	2–0	Shimizu S-Pulse	Osaka
18:03 JST	Seko (yellow card) 53'; Okuno 71'; Katayama 85'	Report	Valdo (yellow card) 44'	Stadium: Yanmar Stadium; Attendance: 0

12 July 2020 4	Cerezo Osaka	0–2	Nagoya Grampus	Osaka
19:03 JST	Mineiro (yellow card) 57'; Sakamoto (yellow card) 69'	Report	Own goal 38'; Abe 61'; Maruyama (yellow card) 87'	Stadium: Yanmar Stadium; Attendance: 4,026

18 July 2020 5	Sanfrecce Hiroshima	1–2	Cerezo Osaka	Hiroshima
19:00 JST	Fujii (yellow card) 48'; Vieira 53'	Report	Own goal 20'; Fujita 50'	Stadium: Edion Stadium

22 July 2020 6	Cerezo Osaka	0–0	Vissel Kobe	Osaka
19:30 JST		Report	Watanabe (yellow card) 45+1'; Nishi (yellow card) 49'	Stadium: Yanmar Stadium Nagai; Attendance: 4,981

26 July 2020 7	Sagan Tosu	1–1	Cerezo Osaka	Tosu, Saga
19:00 JST	Ishii 51'; Eduardo (yellow card) 63'	Report	Fujita (yellow card) 64'; Sakamoto 75'; Koike (yellow card) 77'	Stadium: Ekimae Real Estate Stadium

1 August 2020 8	Shonan Bellmare	0–1	Cerezo Osaka	Hiratsuka
19:00 JST	Saito (yellow card) 21'; Oiwa (yellow card) 59'; Mawatari (yellow card) 71'; Kaneko (yellow card) 76'; Elyounoussi (yellow card) 77'	Summary	Kiyotake 72' (pen.)	Stadium: Shonan BMW Stadium Hiratsuka; Attendance: 3,494; Referee: (Japan) Ryuji Sato

9 August 2020 9	Cerezo Osaka	0–0	FC Tokyo	Osaka
19:00 JST	Bruno Mendes (yellow card) 39'; Desábato (yellow card) 73'	Summary	Abe (yellow card) 77'; Ogawa (yellow card) 87'	Stadium: Yanmar Stadium; Attendance: 4,840; Referee: (Japan) Yudai Yamamoto

15 August 2020 10	Kashiwa Reysol	1–3	Cerezo Osaka	Kashiwa
19:00 JST	Takahashi (yellow card) 54'; Takahashi (yellow card) 80'; Olunga 88'	Report	Bruno Mendes 5'; Okuno (yellow card) 44'; Koga 55' (o.g.); Nishikawa 87'	Stadium: Sankyo Frontier Kashiwa Stadium; Attendance: 2,603; Referee: (Japan) Hiroyoshi Takayama

19 August 2020 11	Kawasaki Frontale	5–2	Cerezo Osaka	Kawasaki
19:00 JST	Wakizaka 21'; Ienaga 42' (pen.); Kobayashi 52'; Mitoma 74'; Leandro Damião 77'; Morita (yellow card) 78'	Report	Bruno Mendes 7'; Seko 58'	Stadium: Kawasaki Todoroki Stadium; Attendance: 4,794; Referee: (Japan) Takuto Okabe

23 August 2020 12	Cerezo Osaka	2–1	Vegalta Sendai	Osaka
19:00 JST	Kiyotake 19' (yellow card) 47'; Sakamoto 60'; Kakitani (yellow card) 90+5'	Report	Hachisuka 45+2'	Stadium: Yanmar Stadium Nagai; Attendance: 3,921; Referee: (Japan) Yudai Yamamoto

30 August 2020 13	Yokohama FC	1–2	Cerezo Osaka	Yokohama
18:00 JST	Matsuo 86'	Report	Kiyotake 14'; Bruno Mendes 58'	Stadium: NHK Spring Mitsuzawa Football Stadium; Attendance: 3,373; Referee: (Japan) Jumpei Iida

5 September 2020 14	Cerezo Osaka	3–0	Urawa Reds	Osaka
19:30 JST	Tokura 48'; Katayama (yellow card) 51'; Deng 74' (o.g.); Fujio 90+3'	Report	Yamanaka (yellow card) 51'	Stadium: Yanmar Stadium Nagai; Attendance: 4,793; Referee: (Japan) Shinji Murakami

9 September 2020 15	Cerezo Osaka	2–0	Consadole Sapporo	Osaka
19:30 JST	Okuno 6' 59'	Report	Douglas Oliveira (yellow card) 28'; Sugeno (yellow card) 45+2'; Bothroyd (yellow card) 62'; Lucas Fernandes (yellow card) 87'	Stadium: Yanmar Stadium Nagai; Attendance: 3,140; Referee: (Japan) Masuya Ueda

13 September 2020 16	Yokohama F. Marinos	1–2	Cerezo Osaka	Yokohama
19:00 JST	Erik 52'; Bunmathan (yellow card) 56'; Ito (red card) 65'	Report	Kiyotake 58'; Takagi 86'	Stadium: Nissan Stadium; Attendance: 4,918; Referee: (Japan) Yoshiro Imamura

16 September 2020 17	Vissel Kobe	0–1	Cerezo Osaka	Kobe
19:00 JST	Dankler (yellow card) 81'	Report	Tokura (red card) 33'; Kakitani 62'	Stadium: Noevir Stadium Kobe; Referee: (Japan) Ryuji Sato

19 September 2020 18	Cerezo Osaka	1–2	Kashima Antlers	Osaka
18:00 JST	Bruno Mendes 36'; Seko (yellow card) 86'	Report	Juan Alano 32'; Misao (yellow card) 39'; Everaldo Stum 46'	Stadium: Yanmar Stadium Nagai; Attendance: 6,836; Referee: (Japan) Hajime Matsuo

23 September 2020 19	FC Tokyo	2–0	Cerezo Osaka	Tokyo
19:00 JST	Diego Oliveira 63'; Adaílton 66'; Morishige (yellow card) 90+3'	Report	Matsuda (yellow card) 90+2'	Stadium: Ajinomoto Stadium; Attendance: 4,316; Referee: (Japan) Yudai Yamamoto

27 September 2020 20	Vegalta Sendai	2–3	Cerezo Osaka	Sendai
13:00 JST	Nishimura 57' 67' (pen.)	Report	Bruno Mendes 44'; Jonjić 81'; Kiyotake 90+1'	Stadium: Yurtec Stadium Sendai; Attendance: 2,789; Referee: (Japan) Yuichi Nishimura

3 October 2020 21	Cerezo Osaka	1–3	Kawasaki Frontale	Osaka
15:00 JST	Okuno 62'	Report	Jesiel (yellow card) 14'; Seko 37' (o.g.); Oshima (yellow card) 71'; Leandro Damião 83'; Mitoma 84'	Stadium: Yanmar Stadium Nagai; Attendance: 11,842; Referee: (Japan) Minoru Tōjō

10 October 2020 22	Nagoya Grampus	1–0	Cerezo Osaka	Nagoya
14:00 JST	Abe (yellow card) 72'; Mateus 90+1'	Report		Stadium: Paloma Mizuho Stadium; Attendance: 7,861; Referee: (Japan) Maasaki Iemoto

14 October 2020 23	Cerezo Osaka	1–0	Shonan Bellmare	Osaka
19:30 JST	Nishikawa (yellow card) 74'; Toyokawa (yellow card) 75'; Jonjić 90+2'	Report	Tani (yellow card) 45+1'	Stadium: Yanmar Stadium Nagai; Attendance: 5,526; Referee: (Japan) Akihiro Ikeuchi

17 October 2020 24	Cerezo Osaka	4–1	Yokohama F. Marinos	Osaka
15:00 JST	Okuno 10' 67'; Toyokawa 71' 81' (yellow card) 88'	Report	Júnior Santos (yellow card) 28'; Mizunuma 90+1'	Stadium: Yanmar Stadium Nagai; Referee: (Japan) Yudai Yamamoto

24 October 2020 25	Urawa Reds	3–1	Cerezo Osaka	Saitama
17:00 JST	Koroki 34' (pen.); Hashioka (yellow card) 37'; Yamanaka 44'; Martinus 71'; Sugimoto (yellow card) 87'	Report	Toyokawa 28'; Seko (yellow card) 33'	Stadium: Saitama Stadium 2002; Attendance: 12,863; Referee: (Japan) Yuichi Nishimura

3 November 2020 26	Cerezo Osaka	1–1	Gamba Osaka	Osaka
13:00 JST	Toyokawa 34'; Jonjić (yellow card) 50'	Report	Kim Young-gwon (yellow card) 4'; Ideguchi 32'; Patric (yellow card) 50'; Miura (yellow card) 78'; Fukuda (yellow card) 79'; Suganuma (yellow card) 90+5'	Stadium: Yanmar Stadium Nagai; Attendance: 19,553; Referee: (Japan) Hiroyuki Kimura

14 November 2020 27	Shimizu S-Pulse	3–1	Cerezo Osaka	Shizuoka
13:00 JST	Renato 49'; Carlinhos (yellow card) 64' (goal) 90+4'; Nakamura 85'	Report	Kiyotake 67'; Matsuda (yellow card) 75'	Stadium: IAI Stadium Nihondaira; Attendance: 6,076; Referee: (Japan) Jumpei Iida

21 November 2020 28	Cerezo Osaka	0–1	Sanfrecce Hiroshima	Osaka
15:00 JST	Matsuda (yellow card) 35'; Kimoto (yellow card) 36'	Report	Leandro Pereira 24' (yellow card) 41' (yellow-red card) 62'; Sasaki (yellow card) 51'; Douglas Viera (yellow card) 74'	Stadium: Yanmar Stadium Nagai; Attendance: 6,625; Referee: (Japan) Ryuji Sato

25 November 2020 29	Oita Trinita	0–1	Cerezo Osaka	Ōita
18:00 JST		Report	Kiyotake 10'	Stadium: Showa Denko Dome Oita; Attendance: 3,861; Referee: (Japan) Nobutsugu Murakami

29 November 2020 30	Cerezo Osaka	1–0	Yokohama FC	Osaka
14:00 JST	Bruno Mendes 61'	Report	Kosuke Saito (yellow card) 68'	Stadium: Yanmar Stadium Nagai; Attendance: 7,365; Referee: (Japan) Futoshi Nakamura

5 December 2020 31	Consadole Sapporo	1–3	Cerezo Osaka	Sapporo
13:00 JST	Bothroyd (yellow card) 62' (goal) 65'	Report	Bruno Mendes 39' 80'; Kiyotake 54'	Stadium: Sapporo Dome; Attendance: 8,905; Referee: (Japan) Yuichi Nishimura

12 December 2020 32	Cerezo Osaka	0–0	Kashiwa Reysol	Osaka
13:00 JST	Fujita (yellow card) 77'; Maruhashi (yellow card) 90+3'	Report	Richardson (yellow card) 27'; Ominami (yellow card) 29'; Goya (yellow card) 83'	Stadium: Yanmar Stadium Nagai; Attendance: 7,889; Referee: (Japan) Hiroyuki Kimura

16 December 2020 33	Cerezo Osaka	1–2	Sagan Tosu	Osaka
18:00 JST	Toyokawa 44'	Report	Higuchi 21'; Nakano (yellow card) 24'; Lopez (yellow card) 90'; Tiago Alves 90+1'	Stadium: Yanmar Stadium Nagai; Attendance: 5,498; Referee: (Japan) Minoru Tōjō

19 December 2020 34	Kashima Antlers	1–1	Cerezo Osaka	Kashima
13:00 JST		Report		Stadium: Kashima Soccer Stadium

=== J.League Cup ===
==== Group stage ====
Pos	Team	Pld	W	D	L	GF	GA	GD	Pts	RED	CER	VEG	YAM
1	Urawa Red Diamonds	1	1	0	0	5	2	+3	3	—	canceled	5–2	RED Wins with 0 goals
2	Cerezo Osaka	1	1	0	0	4	1	+3	3	5 Aug	—	canceled	4–1
3	Vegalta Sendai	1	0	0	1	2	5	−3	0	canceled	12 Aug	—	VEG Wins with 0 goals
4	Matsumoto Yamaga F.C.	1	0	0	1	1	4	−3	0	canceled	canceled	canceled	—

Updated to match(es) played on 16 February 2020. Source: League table, match result

== Statistics ==
=== Goal scorers ===
Rank	No.	Pos.	Player	J.League	Emperor's Cup	J.League Cup	Total
1	20	FW	(Brazil) Bruno Mendes	1	0	2	3
2	25	MF	(Japan) Hiroaki Okuno	2	0	0	2
2	14	DF	(Japan) Yusuke Maruhashi	1	0	1	2
4	5	MF	(Japan) Naoyuki Fujita	1	0	0	1
4	10	MF	(Japan) Hiroshi Kiyotake	0	0	1	1
4	16	FW	(Japan) Eiichi Katayama	1	0	0	1
4	17	MF	(Japan) Tatsuhiro Sakamoto	1	0	0	1
Own goals				1	0	0	1
Total				8	0	4	12

Last updated: 26 July 2020.
Source: Competitions

=== Clean sheets ===
Rank	No.	Pos.	Player	J.League	Emperor's Cup	J.League Cup	Total
1	18	GK	(South Korea) Kim Jin-hyeon	3	0	0	3
Total				3	0	0	3

Last updated: 26 July 2020.
Source: JLeague
