= 2017 Cerezo Osaka season =

Cerezo Osaka
2017 season
- Manager: Yoon Jong-hwan
- Stadium: Yanmar Stadium Nagai
- J1 League: 3rd
- Emperor's Cup: Winner
- J.League Cup: Winner
- Lowest home attendance: 8,992
Home colours	Away colours

The 2017 Cerezo Osaka season was the club's 17th in the J.League 1 and its first following promotion from the 2016 J.League Division 2. The 2017 season would be the most successful season in the club's history to date, as they tied their highest league position, scored the highest number of points in the first division in their history, and won both the Emperor's Cup and the J.League Cup.

== Squad ==
As of 25 January 2017. Note: Flags indicate national team as defined under FIFA eligibility rules; some limited exceptions apply. Players may hold more than one non-FIFA nationality.

No.	Pos.	Nation	Player
1	GK	JPN	Kentaro Kakoi
2	DF	JPN	Matsuda
3	DF	JPN	Teruyuki Moniwa
4	DF	JPN	Kota Fujimoto
5	DF	JPN	Yusuke Tanaka
6	MF	BRA	Souza
7	MF	JPN	Kunimitsu Sekiguchi
8	MF	JPN	Yoichiro Kakitani (captain)
9	FW	JPN	Kenyu Sugimoto
10	MF	JPN	Hotaru Yamaguchi
11	FW	BRA	Ricardo Santos
13	MF	JPN	Mitsuru Maruoka
14	DF	JPN	Yusuke Maruhashi
15	MF	JPN	Yasuki Kimoto
16	MF	JPN	Kota Mizunuma
17	MF	JPN	Takaki Fukumitsu
18	MF	JPN	Shohei Kiyohara
19	FW	JPN	Ryuji Sawakami
20	MF	JPN	Noriyuki Sakemoto
21	GK	KOR	Kim Jin-Hyeon
22	DF	CRO	Matej Jonjić

No.	Pos.	Nation	Player
23	DF	JPN	Tatsuya Yamashita
24	MF	JPN	Kazuya Yamamura
25	MF	JPN	Hirofumi Yamauchi
26	MF	JPN	Daichi Akiyama
27	GK	JPN	Kenta Tanno
28	DF	JPN	Hayato Nukui
29	DF	JPN	Kakeru Funaki
30	MF	JPN	Musashi Oyama
31	FW	JPN	Towa Yamane
32	GK	KOR	Ahn Joon-Soo
33	DF	JPN	Kenta Mukuhara
34	MF	JPN	Masaki Sakamoto
35	MF	JPN	Masaki Okino
36	MF	JPN	Toshiki Onozawa
37	DF	JPN	Reiya Morishita
38	MF	JPN	Masataka Nishimoto
39	DF	JPN	Shoji Honoya
40	FW	JPN	Takeru Kishimoto
45	GK	JPN	Shu Mogi
46	MF	JPN	Hiroshi Kiyotake

=== Out on loan ===
Note: Flags indicate national team as defined under FIFA eligibility rules; some limited exceptions apply. Players may hold more than one non-FIFA nationality.

No.	Pos.	Nation	Player
—	GK	JPN	Hiroyuki Takeda (at Tokyo Verdy)
—	DF	JPN	Jurato Ikeda (at Bangkok Glass F.C.)
—	FW	JPN	Taiga Maekawa (at Tokushima Vortis)
—	FW	JPN	Rei Yonezawa (at Renofa Yamaguchi FC)

== Senior ==
=== J1 League ===
Match	Date	Team	Score	Team	Venue	Attendance
1	2017.02.25	Cerezo Osaka	0–0	Júbilo Iwata	Yanmar Stadium Nagai	33,208
2	2017.03.04	Urawa Reds	3–1	Cerezo Osaka	Saitama Stadium 2002	43,826
3	2017.03.11	Hokkaido Consadole Sapporo	1–1	Cerezo Osaka	Sapporo Dome	21,760
4	2017.03.18	Cerezo Osaka	1–0	Sagan Tosu	Kincho Stadium	13,086
5	2017.04.01	Cerezo Osaka	2–0	Yokohama F. Marinos	Kincho Stadium	14,455
6	2017.04.08	Kashima Antlers	0–1	Cerezo Osaka	Kashima Soccer Stadium	21,078
7	2017.04.16	Cerezo Osaka	2–2	Gamba Osaka	Yanmar Stadium Nagai	42,438
8	2017.04.22	Ventforet Kofu	1–1	Cerezo Osaka	Yamanashi Chuo Bank Stadium	11,038
9	2017.04.30	Cerezo Osaka	2–0	Kawasaki Frontale	Yanmar Stadium Nagai	25,738
10	2017.05.06	Kashiwa Reysol	1–0	Cerezo Osaka	Hitachi Kashiwa Stadium	14,015
11	2017.05.14	Cerezo Osaka	5–2	Sanfrecce Hiroshima	Kincho Stadium	14,351
12	2017.05.20	Omiya Ardija	0–3	Cerezo Osaka	NACK5 Stadium Omiya	11,823
13	2017.05.28	Vissel Kobe	1–2	Cerezo Osaka	Noevir Stadium Kobe	20,391
14	2017.06.04	Cerezo Osaka	4–0	Albirex Niigata	Kincho Stadium	13,363
15	2017.06.17	Cerezo Osaka	1–1	Shimizu S-Pulse	Yanmar Stadium Nagai	22,737
16	2017.06.25	Vegalta Sendai	2–4	Cerezo Osaka	Yurtec Stadium Sendai	15,530
17	2017.07.02	Cerezo Osaka	3–1	FC Tokyo	Kincho Stadium	14,305
18	2017.07.08	Cerezo Osaka	2–1	Kashiwa Reysol	Kincho Stadium	16,759
22	2017.07.22	Cerezo Osaka	4–2	Urawa Reds	Yanmar Stadium Nagai	32,711
19	2017.07.29	Gamba Osaka	3–1	Cerezo Osaka	Suita City Football Stadium	36,177
20	2017.08.05	Cerezo Osaka	3–1	Hokkaido Consadole Sapporo	Kincho Stadium	14,208
21	2017.08.09	Shimizu S-Pulse	3–2	Cerezo Osaka	IAI Stadium Nihondaira	12,324
23	2017.08.19	Júbilo Iwata	1–1	Cerezo Osaka	Yamaha Stadium	14,881
24	2017.08.26	Cerezo Osaka	0–1	Kashima Antlers	Yanmar Stadium Nagai	35,516
25	2017.09.09	FC Tokyo	1–4	Cerezo Osaka	Ajinomoto Stadium	36,635
26	2017.09.16	Sanfrecce Hiroshima	1–0	Cerezo Osaka	Edion Stadium Hiroshima	11,726
27	2017.09.23	Cerezo Osaka	1–4	Vegalta Sendai	Kincho Stadium	15,262
28	2017.09.30	Kawasaki Frontale	5–1	Cerezo Osaka	Kawasaki Todoroki Stadium	24,225
29	2017.10.15	Sagan Tosu	1–2	Cerezo Osaka	Best Amenity Stadium	14,896
30	2017.10.21	Cerezo Osaka	2–0	Ventforet Kofu	Kincho Stadium	9,438
31	2017.10.29	Cerezo Osaka	2–1	Omiya Ardija	Kincho Stadium	8,998
32	2017.11.18	Yokohama F. Marinos	1–4	Cerezo Osaka	Nissan Stadium	34,153
33	2017.11.26	Cerezo Osaka	3–1	Vissel Kobe	Yanmar Stadium Nagai	29,918
34	2017.12.02	Albirex Niigata	1–0	Cerezo Osaka	Denka Big Swan Stadium	19,684

== U-23 ==
=== J3 League ===
Match	Date	Team	Score	Team	Venue	Attendance
1	2017.03.12	Cerezo Osaka U-23	2–2	Grulla Morioka	Kincho Stadium	1,038
2	2017.03.19	Cerezo Osaka U-23	1–3	Blaublitz Akita	Kincho Stadium	1,083
3	2017.03.26	Giravanz Kitakyushu	1–0	Cerezo Osaka U-23	Mikuni World Stadium Kitakyushu	4,455
4	2017.04.01	YSCC Yokohama	2–2	Cerezo Osaka U-23	NHK Spring Mitsuzawa Football Stadium	559
5	2017.04.15	Cerezo Osaka U-23	0–1	FC Tokyo U-23	Yanmar Stadium Nagai	1,375
6	2017.04.29	Cerezo Osaka U-23	0–1	Tochigi SC	Yanmar Stadium Nagai	951
7	2017.05.06	Kagoshima United FC	0–1	Cerezo Osaka U-23	Kagoshima Kamoike Stadium	4,918
8	2017.05.13	Cerezo Osaka U-23	1–1	Kataller Toyama	Kincho Stadium	748
9	2017.05.21	Gainare Tottori	1–3	Cerezo Osaka U-23	Tottori Bank Bird Stadium	1,363
10	2017.05.28	Gamba Osaka U-23	0–0	Cerezo Osaka U-23	Suita City Football Stadium	2,317
11	2017.06.03	Cerezo Osaka U-23	1–2	FC Ryukyu	Kincho Stadium	762
12	2017.06.10	Cerezo Osaka U-23	1–4	Azul Claro Numazu	Kincho Stadium	852
13	2017.06.18	AC Nagano Parceiro	1–1	Cerezo Osaka U-23	Minami Nagano Sports Park Stadium	4,169
14	2017.06.25	Fujieda MYFC	1–0	Cerezo Osaka U-23	Shizuoka Stadium	1,214
15	2017.07.01	Cerezo Osaka U-23	2–2	SC Sagamihara	Kincho Stadium	754
17	2017.07.16	Fukushima United FC	3–2	Cerezo Osaka U-23	Aizu Athletic Park Stadium	1,419
18	2017.07.23	Cerezo Osaka U-23	1–3	Kagoshima United FC	Yanmar Stadium Nagai	745
19	2017.08.20	SC Sagamihara	1–3	Cerezo Osaka U-23	Sagamihara Gion Stadium	6,122
20	2017.08.27	Cerezo Osaka U-23	0–0	AC Nagano Parceiro	Yanmar Stadium Nagai	727
22	2017.09.09	Kataller Toyama	0–0	Cerezo Osaka U-23	Toyama Stadium	3,425
24	2017.09.24	Cerezo Osaka U-23	2–1	Fukushima United FC	Kincho Stadium	543
25	2017.09.30	FC Ryukyu	1–0	Cerezo Osaka U-23	Okinawa Athletic Park Stadium	2,321
26	2017.10.07	Cerezo Osaka U-23	3–2	Gamba Osaka U-23	Yanmar Stadium Nagai	1,653
23	2017.10.11	Cerezo Osaka U-23	2–2	Giravanz Kitakyushu	Yanmar Stadium Nagai	674
27	2017.10.14	Tochigi SC	1–0	Cerezo Osaka U-23	Tochigi Green Stadium	3,633
28	2017.10.22	Cerezo Osaka U-23	2–2	YSCC Yokohama	Kincho Stadium	273
29	2017.10.29	Azul Claro Numazu	1–0	Cerezo Osaka U-23	Ashitaka Park Stadium	753
30	2017.11.05	Cerezo Osaka U-23	2–0	Gainare Tottori	Kochi Haruno Athletic Stadium	1,422
31	2017.11.12	Blaublitz Akita	0–3	Cerezo Osaka U-23	Akigin Stadium	3,109
32	2017.11.19	Cerezo Osaka U-23	0–0	Fujieda MYFC	Yanmar Stadium Nagai	945
33	2017.11.26	Grulla Morioka	2–3	Cerezo Osaka U-23	Iwagin Stadium	1,020
34	2017.12.03	FC Tokyo U-23	2–1	Cerezo Osaka U-23	Komazawa Olympic Park Stadium	6,338
