= 2018 Cerezo Osaka season =

Cerezo Osaka
2018 season
- Manager: Yoon Jong-hwan
- Stadium: Kincho Stadium
- J1 League: 7th
- Japanese Super Cup: Winners
- J.League Cup: Quarter-finals
- Emperor's Cup: 4th Round
- AFC Champions League: Group stage
- Suruga Bank Championship: Runners-up
Home colours	Away colours	Third colours

The 2018 Cerezo Osaka season was the club's 18th in the J1 League.

== Squad ==
As of 4 June 2018. Note: Flags indicate national team as defined under FIFA eligibility rules; some limited exceptions apply. Players may hold more than one non-FIFA nationality.

No.	Pos.	Nation	Player
1	GK	JPN	Takumi Nagaishi
2	DF	JPN	Riku Matsuda
3	DF	JPN	Teruyuki Moniwa
4	DF	JPN	Kota Fujimoto
5	DF	JPN	Yusuke Tanaka
6	MF	JPN	Hotaru Yamaguchi (captain)
7	MF	JPN	Kota Mizunuma
8	MF	JPN	Yoichiro Kakitani
9	FW	JPN	Kenyu Sugimoto
10	MF	JPN	Hiroshi Kiyotake (co-captain)
11	MF	BRA	Souza
13	FW	JPN	Toshiyuki Takagi
14	DF	JPN	Yusuke Maruhashi
15	MF	JPN	Yasuki Kimoto
16	FW	JPN	Eiichi Katayama
17	MF	JPN	Takaki Fukumitsu
18	FW	KOR	Yang Dong-Hyun
19	FW	JPN	Ryuji Sawakami
20	MF	JPN	Noriyuki Sakemoto
21	GK	KOR	Kim Jin-Hyeon
22	DF	CRO	Matej Jonjić
23	DF	JPN	Tatsuya Yamashita

No.	Pos.	Nation	Player
24	MF	JPN	Kazuya Yamamura
25	MF	JPN	Hirofumi Yamauchi
26	MF	JPN	Daichi Akiyama (co-captain)
27	GK	JPN	Kenta Tanno
28	FW	JPN	Motohiko Nakajima
29	DF	JPN	Kakeru Funaki
30	MF	JPN	Musashi Oyama
31	FW	JPN	Towa Yamane
32	MF	JPN	Atomu Tanaka
33	FW	JPN	Rei Yonezawa
34	FW	JPN	Hiroto Yamada
35	MF	JPN	Masaki Okino
36	MF	JPN	Toshiki Onozawa
37	DF	JPN	Reiya Morishita (U-23 co-captain)
38	MF	JPN	Masataka Nishimoto (U-23 captain)
39	MF	THA	Chaowat Veerachat (on loan from Bangkok Glass)
40	FW	JPN	Mizuki Ando
41	MF	JPN	Naoya Uozato
43	MF	ESP	Osmar Barba (on loan from FC Seoul)
45	GK	JPN	Shu Mogi
–	FW	AUS	Pierce Waring

=== Out on loan ===
Last updated 10 January 2018.

Note: Flags indicate national team as defined under FIFA eligibility rules; some limited exceptions apply. Players may hold more than one non-FIFA nationality.

No.	Pos.	Nation	Player
—	GK	JPN	Kentaro Kakoi (to Avispa Fukuoka)
—	GK	KOR	Ahn Joon-Soo (to Kagoshima United FC)
—	FW	JPN	Takeru Kishimoto (to Mito Hollyhock)

No.	Pos.	Nation	Player
—	FW	JPN	Taiga Maekawa (to Tokushima Vortis)
—	MF	JPN	Mitsuru Maruoka (to Renofa Yamaguchi)

== Senior team ==
=== J1 League ===
Pos	Team	Pld	W	D	L	GF	GA	GD	Pts	Qualification or relegation
5	Urawa Red Diamonds	34	14	9	11	51	39	+12	51	Qualification for the Champions League group stage (Note: Urawa Red Diamonds qualified for the 2019 AFC Champions League group stage as 2018 Emperor's Cup winners.)
6	FC Tokyo	34	14	8	12	39	34	+5	50	
7	Cerezo Osaka	34	13	11	10	39	38	+1	50	
8	Shimizu S-Pulse	34	14	7	13	56	48	+8	49	
9	Gamba Osaka	34	14	6	14	41	46	−5	48	

Source: Meiji Yasuda J1 League
Rules for classification: 1) Points; 2) Goal difference; 3) Goals scored
Notes:

Match	Date	Team	Score	Team	Venue	Attendance
1	2018.02.25	Cerezo Osaka	1–1	Yokohama F. Marinos	Yanmar Stadium Nagai	23,049
2	2018.03.02	Cerezo Osaka	3–3	Hokkaido Consadole Sapporo	Kincho Stadium	10,415
3	2018.03.10	Kashiwa Reysol	1–1	Cerezo Osaka	Sankyo Frontier Kashiwa Stadium	11,091
4	2018.03.18	Vissel Kobe	2–0	Cerezo Osaka	Noevir Stadium Kobe	20,108
5	2018.03.31	Cerezo Osaka	2–1	Shonan Bellmare	Kincho Stadium	13,882
6	2018.04.07	Cerezo Osaka	2–1	Sagan Tosu	Kincho Stadium	10,627
7	2018.04.11	Kawasaki Frontale	1–2	Cerezo Osaka	Kawasaki Todoroki Stadium	17,113
8	2018.04.14	Cerezo Osaka	1–0	FC Tokyo	Yanmar Stadium Nagai	17,790
9	2018.04.21	Gamba Osaka	1–0	Cerezo Osaka	Panasonic Stadium Suita	35,242
10	2018.04.25	Cerezo Osaka	2–1	Vegalta Sendai	Kincho Stadium	8,165
11	2018.04.28	Júbilo Iwata	1–1	Cerezo Osaka	Yamaha Stadium	13,884
12	2018.05.02	Nagoya Grampus	0–0	Cerezo Osaka	Paloma Mizuho Stadium	13,220
13	2018.05.05	Cerezo Osaka	3–1	V-Varen Nagasaki	Yanmar Stadium Nagai	29,845
15	2018.05.20	Sanfrecce Hiroshima	0–2	Cerezo Osaka	Edion Stadium Hiroshima	20,219
16	2018.07.18	Shimizu S-Pulse	3–0	Cerezo Osaka	IAI Stadium Nihondaira	9,782
17	2018.07.22	Cerezo Osaka	1–1	Urawa Reds	Yanmar Stadium Nagai	27,915
14	2018.07.25	Cerezo Osaka	0–2	Kashima Antlers	Yanmar Stadium Nagai	16,631
18	2018.07.28	Vegalta Sendai	2–2	Cerezo Osaka	Yurtec Stadium Sendai	14,911
19	2018.08.01	Cerezo Osaka	1–1	Vissel Kobe	Kincho Stadium	14,241
20	2018.08.05	Sagan Tosu	1–0	Cerezo Osaka	Best Amenity Stadium	14,463
21	2018.08.11	Hokkaido Consadole Sapporo	1–1	Cerezo Osaka	Sapporo Dome	21,614
22	2018.08.15	Cerezo Osaka	3–1	Shimizu S-Pulse	Kincho Stadium	14,628
23	2018.08.19	V-Varen Nagasaki	0–2	Cerezo Osaka	Transcosmos Stadium Nagasaki	12,366
24	2018.08.25	Cerezo Osaka	0–1	Sanfrecce Hiroshima	Yanmar Stadium Nagai	23,442
25	2018.09.01	Urawa Reds	1–2	Cerezo Osaka	Saitama Stadium 2002	27,337
26	2018.09.14	Cerezo Osaka	1–1	Júbilo Iwata	Kincho Stadium	13,112
27	2018.09.22	Shonan Bellmare	1–1	Cerezo Osaka	Shonan BMW Stadium Hiratsuka	12,173
29	2018.10.06	Cerezo Osaka	0–1	Gamba Osaka	Yanmar Stadium Nagai	34,303
30	2018.10.20	FC Tokyo	0–1	Cerezo Osaka	Ajinomoto Stadium	28,053
31	2018.10.31	Kashima Antlers	1–0	Cerezo Osaka	Kashima Soccer Stadium	9,233
28	2018.11.06	Cerezo Osaka	0–1	Nagoya Grampus	Kincho Stadium	12,027
32	2018.11.10	Cerezo Osaka	2–1	Kawasaki Frontale	Yanmar Stadium Nagai	26,600
33	2018.11.24	Cerezo Osaka	0–3	Kashiwa Reysol	Yanmar Stadium Nagai	23,110
34	2018.12.01	Yokohama F. Marinos	1–2	Cerezo Osaka	Nissan Stadium	30,608

=== Japanese Super Cup ===
Cerezo Osaka qualified for this tournament as winners of the 2017 Emperor's Cup.

10 February 2018 Final	Kawasaki Frontale	2–3	Cerezo Osaka	Saitama
13:35	Kobayashi 51'; Ōkubo 90+2'	Report	Yamaguchi 26'; Kiyotake 48'; Takagi 78'	Stadium: Saitama Stadium 2002; Attendance: 41,803; Referee: Koichiro Fukushima

=== J.League Cup ===
Cerezo Osaka received a bye to the quarter-finals in order to avoid scheduling conflicts due to their participation in the AFC Champions League.

Quarter-finals

5 September 2018 1st leg	Shonan Bellmare	3–0	Cerezo Osaka	Hiratsuka
19:03	Matsuda 28'; Umesaki 70'; Kaneko 75'	Report		Stadium: Shonan BMW Stadium; Attendance: 5,896; Referee: Takuto Okabe

9 September 2018 2nd leg	Cerezo Osaka	2–2 (2–5 agg.)	Shonan Bellmare	Osaka
19:03	Takagi 25'; Souza 35'	Report	Kaneko 31'; Yamasaki 44'	Stadium: Yanmar Stadium Nagai; Attendance: 6,589; Referee: Masaaki Iemoto

=== Emperor's Cup ===
Cerezo Osaka received a bye to the second round as being part of the J1 League.

6 June 2018 2nd round	Cerezo Osaka	1–0	Tegevajaro Miyazaki	Osaka
19:01	Takagi 31'	Report		Stadium: Kincho Stadium; Attendance: 2,565; Referee: Hayato Shimizu

11 July 2018 3rd round	Cerezo Osaka	3–0	Zweigen Kanazawa	Kanazawa
19:01	Mizunuma 10'; Kiyotake 26'; Fukumitsu 90+3'	Report		Stadium: Ishikawa Athletics Stadium; Attendance: 5,540; Referee: Shinji Murakami

22 August 2018 4th round	Cerezo Osaka	0–1 (a.e.t.)	Ventforet Kofu	Kōfu
19:03		Report	Soneda 120'	Stadium: Yamanashi Chuo Bank Stadium; Attendance: 2,957; Referee: Yuichi Nishimura

=== AFC Champions League ===
Cerezo Osaka qualified for this tournament as winners of the 2017 Emperor's Cup; they also finished in 3rd place in the 2017 J1 League.

Pos	Team	Pld	W	D	L	GF	GA	GD	Pts	Qualification	GZE	BUR	CER	JEJ
1	(China) Guangzhou Evergrande	6	3	3	0	12	6	+6	12	Advance to knockout stage	—	1–1	3–1	5–3
2	(Thailand) Buriram United	6	2	3	1	7	6	+1	9	Advance to knockout stage	1–1	—	2–0	0–2
3	(Japan) Cerezo Osaka	6	2	2	2	6	8	−2	8		0–0	2–2	—	2–1
4	(South Korea) Jeju United	6	1	0	5	6	11	−5	3		0–2	0–1	0–1	—

Source: AFC
Rules for classification: Group stage tiebreakers

=== Suruga Bank Championship ===
Cerezo Osaka qualified for this tournament as winners of the 2017 J.League Cup.

8 August 2018 Final	Cerezo Osaka (Japan)	0–1	(Argentina) Independiente	Osaka, Japan
19:00		Report	Romero 28'	Stadium: Yanmar Stadium Nagai; Attendance: 10,035; Referee: Matthew Conger (New Zealand)

== U-23 Team ==
=== J3 League ===
Pos	Team	Pld	W	D	L	GF	GA	GD	Pts
5	Thespakusatsu Gunma	32	15	7	10	37	35	+2	52
6	Gamba Osaka U-23	32	13	8	11	53	43	+10	47
7	Cerezo Osaka U-23	32	13	7	12	47	36	+11	46
8	Blaublitz Akita	32	12	7	13	37	35	+2	43
9	SC Sagamihara	32	12	6	14	42	53	−11	42

Source: 2018 MEIJI YASUDA J3 LEAGUE League table
Rules for classification: 1) Points; 2) Goal difference; 3) Goals scored; 4th) head-to-head results; 5th) disciplinary points; 6th) draw

Match	Date	Team	Score	Team	Venue	Attendance
1	2018.03.10	Cerezo Osaka U-23	0–1	Blaublitz Akita	Yanmar Stadium Nagai	1,013
3	2018.03.21	Kataller Toyama	1–2	Cerezo Osaka U-23	Toyama Stadium	1,602
4	2018.03.25	Cerezo Osaka U-23	2–1	SC Sagamihara	Kincho Stadium	1,009
5	2018.04.01	Cerezo Osaka U-23	2–0	FC Tokyo U-23	Kincho Stadium	1,041
6	2018.04.07	FC Ryukyu	1–1	Cerezo Osaka U-23	Okinawa Athletic Park Stadium	1,782
7	2018.04.15	Cerezo Osaka U-23	1–1	Fukushima United FC	Kincho Stadium	769
8	2018.04.28	AC Nagano Parceiro	1–2	Cerezo Osaka U-23	Nagano U Stadium	3,198
9	2018.05.03	Gainare Tottori	1–4	Cerezo Osaka U-23	Tottori Bank Bird Stadium	2,603
10	2018.05.06	Cerezo Osaka U-23	1–1	Giravanz Kitakyushu	Kincho Stadium	1,159
11	2018.05.19	YSCC Yokohama	1–1	Cerezo Osaka U-23	NHK Spring Mitsuzawa Football Stadium	728
12	2018.06.02	Cerezo Osaka U-23	1–1	Gamba Osaka U-23	Yanmar Stadium Nagai	4,551
13	2018.06.09	Thespakusatsu Gunma	1–0	Cerezo Osaka U-23	Shoda Shoyu Stadium Gunma	4,700
14	2018.06.16	Kagoshima United FC	2–1	Cerezo Osaka U-23	Shiranami Stadium	3,901
15	2018.06.23	Cerezo Osaka U-23	1–2	Fujieda MYFC	Kincho Stadium	710
16	2018.07.01	Azul Claro Numazu	1–1	Cerezo Osaka U-23	Ashitaka Park Stadium	2,379
17	2018.07.07	Cerezo Osaka U-23	1–2	Grulla Morioka	Kincho Stadium	513
18	2018.07.15	FC Tokyo U-23	1–3	Cerezo Osaka U-23	Ajinomoto Field Nishigaoka	1,980
19	2018.07.21	Cerezo Osaka U-23	0–4	Gainare Tottori	Yanmar Stadium Nagai	1,047
20	2018.08.26	Cerezo Osaka U-23	1–2	Kagoshima United FC	Yanmar Stadium Nagai	684
21	2018.09.02	Fukushima United FC	1–0	Cerezo Osaka U-23	Toho Stadium	1,174
22	2018.09.08	Cerezo Osaka U-23	0–2	Thespakusatsu Gunma	Kincho Stadium	1,192
23	2018.09.16	Fujieda MYFC	1–2	Cerezo Osaka U-23	Fujieda Soccer Stadium	907
24	2018.09.22	Giravanz Kitakyushu	1–2	Cerezo Osaka U-23	Mikuni World Stadium Kitakyushu	3,980
25	2018.09.29	Cerezo Osaka U-23	2–0	AC Nagano Parceiro	Yanmar Stadium Nagai	509
26	2018.10.07	Cerezo Osaka U-23	2–0	YSCC Yokohama	Yanmar Stadium Nagai	620
28	2018.10.21	SC Sagamihara	2–1	Cerezo Osaka U-23	Sagamihara Gion Stadium	1,955
29	2018.10.28	Cerezo Osaka U-23	0–0	Azul Claro Numazu	Kincho Stadium	966
30	2018.11.04	Blaublitz Akita	1–4	Cerezo Osaka U-23	Akita Yabase Athletic Field	2,032
31	2018.11.11	Cerezo Osaka U-23	6–0	FC Ryukyu	Yanmar Stadium Nagai	1,012
32	2018.11.18	Grulla Morioka	2–1	Cerezo Osaka U-23	Iwagin Stadium	1,352
33	2018.11.25	Cerezo Osaka U-23	0–1	Kataller Toyama	Yanmar Stadium Nagai	989
34	2018.12.02	Gamba Osaka U-23	0–2	Cerezo Osaka U-23	Panasonic Stadium Suita	3,753
