= Ayumu Seko =

Japanese association football player

Personal information
- Full name: Ayumu Seko
- Date of birth: 7 June 2000 (age 26)
- Place of birth: Taishō-ku, Ōsaka, Ōsaka, Japan
- Height: 1.85 m (6 ft 1 in)
- Position: Centre back

Team information
- Current team: Le Havre
- Number: 5

Youth career
- 2007–2009: Nakaizuo JSC
- 2010–2018: Cerezo Osaka

Senior career*
Years	Team	Apps	(Gls)
2016–2019	Cerezo Osaka U-23	35	(1)
2016–2022	Cerezo Osaka	67	(2)
2022–2025	Grasshopper	117	(1)
2025–	Le Havre	36	(0)

International career^{‡}
2015	Japan U15	4	(0)
2017	Japan U17	4	(0)
2018	Japan U19	4	(0)
2019	Japan U20	5	(0)
2019–2022	Japan U22	1	(0)
2023–	Japan	21	(0)
Medal record
Cerezo Osaka
Winner	J.League Cup	2017
Winner	Emperor's Cup	2017
Representing Japan
AFC U-19 Championship
Bronze medal – third place	2018
- * Club domestic league appearances and goals as of 10 October 2026 ‡ National team caps and goals as of 14 November 2026

Ayumu Seko (瀬古 歩夢, Seko Ayumu; born 7 June 2000) is a Japanese professional footballer who plays for Ligue 1 club Le Havre and the Japan national team.

== Club career ==
Seko joined Cerezo Osaka in 2016. On 13 November, he debuted for their U-23 squad in J3 League (v Kataller Toyama). He gave his J1 League debut for the main squad on 7 December 2019, in 2–0 victory over Ōita.

He signed a three-year contract with Swiss Super League team Grasshopper Club Zürich on 18 January 2022. On 17 June 2025, it was announced that he would depart Grasshoppers that summer, having made 117 league appearances for the Swiss record champions.

On 23 July 2025, he signed for Ligue 1 side Le Havre.

== Style of play ==
Seko is a versatile defender primarily deployed as a centre-back, although he has also played as a defensive midfielder and holding midfielder. His playing style is characterised by his technical ability, tactical awareness, positional versatility and ability to contribute to build-up play. He has been described by J.League as a playmaking centre-back, reflecting his ability to distribute the ball and participate in the organisation of attacks from deeper positions. His experience playing in midfield during his youth helped develop his ability to operate under pressure from multiple directions and use both feet effectively.

During his time at Le Havre, Seko was also deployed as a defensive midfielder, demonstrating his ability to adapt to different tactical roles. His manager, Didier Digard, praised his versatility and reliability, while French media highlighted his ability to cover large areas of the pitch, his consistency and his understanding of the game. His experience in midfield has further developed his awareness of surrounding players, positional discipline and ability to maintain the balance between defensive and attacking phases.

== International career ==
Seko was called up to give his debut for the Japan national team in a friendly against Uzbekistan on 21 January 2022. However, the match was cancelled by the JFA due to COVID restrictions.

In March 2023, he was called up by Hajime Moriyasu for friendlies against Uruguay and Colombia. This time, he was able to make his debut, having played a full match against Uruguay on 24 March 2023, which ended in a 1–1 draw.

On 15 May 2026, Seko was selected in the 26-man squad for the 2026 FIFA World Cup.

== Career statistics ==
=== Club ===
As of match played 10 October 2026

Appearances and goals by club, season and competition
Club	Season	League			National cup (Note: Includes Emperor's Cup, Swiss Cup)		League cup (Note: Includes J.League Cup)		Continental		Other		Total	
Club	Season	Division	Apps	Goals	Apps	Goals	Apps	Goals	Apps	Goals	Apps	Goals	Apps	Goals
Cerezo Osaka U-23	2016	J3 League	1	0	—		—		—		—		1	0
Cerezo Osaka U-23	2017	J3 League	11	0	—		—		—		—		11	0
Cerezo Osaka U-23	2018	J3 League	16	1	—		—		—		—		16	1
Cerezo Osaka U-23	2019	J3 League	7	0	—		—		—		—		7	0
Cerezo Osaka U-23	Total		35	1	—		—		—		—		35	1
Cerezo Osaka	2017	J1 League	0	0	3	0	0	0	—		—		3	0
Cerezo Osaka	2019	J1 League	13	1	3	0	6	0	—		—		22	1
Cerezo Osaka	2020	J1 League	27	1	0	0	4	0	—		—		31	1
Cerezo Osaka	2021	J1 League	27	0	3	0	3	0	5 (Note: Appearances in AFC Champions League)	0	—		38	0
Cerezo Osaka	Total		67	2	9	0	13	0	5	0	—		94	2
Grasshopper	2021–22	Swiss Super League	13	0	—		—		—		—		13	0
Grasshopper	2022–23	Swiss Super League	31	0	3	2	—		—		—		34	2
Grasshopper	2023–24	Swiss Super League	36	1	1	0	—		—		2 (Note: Appearances in Swiss Super League relegation play-off)	0	39	1
Grasshopper	2024–25	Swiss Super League	37	0	1	0	—		—		2	1	40	1
Grasshopper	Total		117	1	5	2	—		—		4	1	126	4
Le Havre	2025–26	Ligue 1	30	0	0	0	—		—		—		30	0
Le Havre	2026–27	Ligue 1	6	0	0	0	—		—		—		6	0
Le Havre	Total		36	0	0	0	—		—		—		36	0
Career total			255	4	14	2	13	0	5	0	4	1	291	7

=== International ===
As of match played 14 November 2026

Appearances and goals by national team and year
National team	Year	Apps	Goals
Japan	2023	3	0
Japan	2024	1	0
Japan	2025	7	0
Japan	2026	10	0
Total		21	0

== Honours ==
Individual

- J.League Rookie of the Year: 2020
- J.League Cup New Hero Award: 2020
