= Taiyo Shimokawa =

Japanese footballer

Personal information
- Date of birth: 7 March 2002 (age 24)
- Place of birth: Osaka, Japan
- Height: 1.64 m (5 ft 5 in)
- Position: Defender

Team information
- Current team: Thespa Gunma
- Number: 20

Youth career
- Vitoria Matsubara FC
- –2019: Cerezo Osaka

Senior career*
Years	Team	Apps	(Gls)
2019	Cerezo Osaka U-23	16	(1)
2020–2024	Kamatamare Sanuki	76	(1)
2025–	Thespa Gunma	46	(2)

International career^{‡}
2017	Japan U15	7	(0)
2018–2019	Japan U17	6	(1)
- * Club domestic league appearances and goals as of 25 August 2026 ‡ National team caps and goals as of 17:04, 13 November 2020 (UTC)

Taiyo Shimokawa (下川 太陽, Shimokawa Taiyō; born 7 March 2002) is a Japanese footballer currently playing as a defender for Thespa Gunma.

== Early life ==
Taiyo was born in Osaka. He played for Vitoria Matsubara and Cerezo Osaka in his youth.

== Club career ==
Taiyo made his debut for Cerezo Osaka II against Fujieda MYFC, coming on in the 86th minute for Masataka Nishimoto. He scored his first goal for Cerezo against Kamatamare on the 6th of July 2019, scoring in the 4th minute.

Taiyo made his debut for Kamatamare Sanuki against Gainare Tottori on the 19th of July 2020.

== International career ==
Taiyo has international caps at youth level for Japan.

== Career statistics ==
=== Club ===
As of 13 November 2020.

Club	Season	League			National Cup		League Cup		Other		Total	
Club	Season	Division	Apps	Goals	Apps	Goals	Apps	Goals	Apps	Goals	Apps	Goals
Cerezo Osaka U-23	2019	J3 League	16	1	–		–		0	0	16	1
Kamatamare Sanuki	2020	J3 League	14	0	0	0	–		0	0	14	0
Career total			30	1	0	0	0	0	0	0	30	1
