= Masaki Sakamoto =

Japanese footballer

Masaki Sakamoto 阪本 将基
Personal information
- Date of birth: June 24, 1996 (age 30)
- Place of birth: Akashi, Hyōgo, Japan
- Height: 1.70 m (5 ft 7 in)
- Position: Midfielder

Team information
- Current team: Maruyasu Okazaki
- Number: 7

Youth career
- 2009–2014: Cerezo Osaka

Senior career*
Years	Team	Apps	(Gls)
2015–2017	Cerezo Osaka	1	(0)
2015	→ J.League U-22 (loan)	1	(0)
2016–2017	→ Cerezo Osaka U-23 (loan)	39	(3)
2018–2019	Kagoshima United	0	(0)
2019	→ Maruyasu Okazaki (loan)	3	(0)
2020–	Maruyasu Okazaki	10	(0)
Medal record
Cerezo Osaka
Winner	J.League Cup	2017
Winner	Emperor's Cup	2017
- * Club domestic league appearances and goals as of 12:42, 16 January 2021 (UTC)

Masaki Sakamoto (阪本 将基, Sakamoto Masaki; born June 24, 1996 in Hyōgo) is a Japanese football player for Kagoshima United FC.

== Career ==
Masaki Sakamoto joined J2 League club Cerezo Osaka in 2015.

In September 2019, Sakamoto joined Maruyasu Okazaki on loan from Kagoshima United. On 15 January 2020 the club announced, that Sakamoto had joined the club permanently.

== Club statistics ==
Updated to 23 February 2018.

Club performance			League		Cup		League Cup		Total	
Season	Club	League	Apps	Goals	Apps	Goals	Apps	Goals	Apps	Goals
Japan			League		Emperor's Cup		J.League Cup		Total	
2014	Cerezo Osaka	J1 League	0	0	2	2	0	0	0	0
2015	Cerezo Osaka	J2 League	1	0	0	0	–		1	0
2016	Cerezo Osaka	J2 League	0	0	0	0	–		0	0
2016	Cerezo Osaka U-23	J3 League	18	2	–		–		18	2
2017	Cerezo Osaka	J1 League	0	0	0	0	0	0	0	0
2017	Cerezo Osaka U-23	J3 League	21	1	–		–		21	1
Career total			40	3	2	2	0	0	42	5
