= 2018 Cerezo Osaka U-23 season =

Cerezo Osaka U-23
2018 season
- Manager: Yuji Okuma
- Stadium: Kincho Stadium
- J3 League: 7th
Home colours	Away colours

2018 Cerezo Osaka U-23 season.

== J3 League ==
Match	Date	Team	Score	Team	Venue	Attendance
1	2018.03.10	Cerezo Osaka U-23	0-1	Blaublitz Akita	Yanmar Stadium Nagai	1,013
3	2018.03.21	Kataller Toyama	1-2	Cerezo Osaka U-23	Toyama Stadium	1,602
4	2018.03.25	Cerezo Osaka U-23	2-1	SC Sagamihara	Kincho Stadium	1,009
5	2018.04.01	Cerezo Osaka U-23	2-0	FC Tokyo U-23	Kincho Stadium	1,041
6	2018.04.07	FC Ryukyu	1-1	Cerezo Osaka U-23	Okinawa Athletic Park Stadium	1,782
7	2018.04.15	Cerezo Osaka U-23	1-1	Fukushima United FC	Kincho Stadium	769
8	2018.04.28	AC Nagano Parceiro	1-2	Cerezo Osaka U-23	Nagano U Stadium	3,198
9	2018.05.03	Gainare Tottori	1-4	Cerezo Osaka U-23	Tottori Bank Bird Stadium	2,603
10	2018.05.06	Cerezo Osaka U-23	1-1	Giravanz Kitakyushu	Kincho Stadium	1,159
11	2018.05.19	YSCC Yokohama	1-1	Cerezo Osaka U-23	NHK Spring Mitsuzawa Football Stadium	728
12	2018.06.02	Cerezo Osaka U-23	1-1	Gamba Osaka U-23	Yanmar Stadium Nagai	4,551
13	2018.06.09	Thespakusatsu Gunma	1-0	Cerezo Osaka U-23	Shoda Shoyu Stadium Gunma	4,700
14	2018.06.16	Kagoshima United FC	2-1	Cerezo Osaka U-23	Shiranami Stadium	3,901
15	2018.06.23	Cerezo Osaka U-23	1-2	Fujieda MYFC	Kincho Stadium	710
16	2018.07.01	Azul Claro Numazu	1-1	Cerezo Osaka U-23	Ashitaka Park Stadium	2,379
17	2018.07.07	Cerezo Osaka U-23	1-2	Grulla Morioka	Kincho Stadium	513
18	2018.07.15	FC Tokyo U-23	1-3	Cerezo Osaka U-23	Ajinomoto Field Nishigaoka	1,980
19	2018.07.21	Cerezo Osaka U-23	0-4	Gainare Tottori	Yanmar Stadium Nagai	1,047
20	2018.08.26	Cerezo Osaka U-23	1-2	Kagoshima United FC	Yanmar Stadium Nagai	684
21	2018.09.02	Fukushima United FC	1-0	Cerezo Osaka U-23	Toho Stadium	1,174
22	2018.09.08	Cerezo Osaka U-23	0-2	Thespakusatsu Gunma	Kincho Stadium	1,192
23	2018.09.16	Fujieda MYFC	1-2	Cerezo Osaka U-23	Fujieda Soccer Stadium	907
24	2018.09.22	Giravanz Kitakyushu	1-2	Cerezo Osaka U-23	Mikuni World Stadium Kitakyushu	3,980
25	2018.09.29	Cerezo Osaka U-23	2-0	AC Nagano Parceiro	Yanmar Stadium Nagai	509
26	2018.10.07	Cerezo Osaka U-23	2-0	YSCC Yokohama	Yanmar Stadium Nagai	620
28	2018.10.21	SC Sagamihara	2-1	Cerezo Osaka U-23	Sagamihara Gion Stadium	1,955
29	2018.10.28	Cerezo Osaka U-23	0-0	Azul Claro Numazu	Kincho Stadium	966
30	2018.11.04	Blaublitz Akita	1-4	Cerezo Osaka U-23	Akita Yabase Athletic Field	2,032
31	2018.11.11	Cerezo Osaka U-23	6-0	FC Ryukyu	Yanmar Stadium Nagai	1,012
32	2018.11.18	Grulla Morioka	2-1	Cerezo Osaka U-23	Iwagin Stadium	1,352
33	2018.11.25	Cerezo Osaka U-23	0-1	Kataller Toyama	Yanmar Stadium Nagai	989
34	2018.12.02	Gamba Osaka U-23	0-2	Cerezo Osaka U-23	Panasonic Stadium Suita	3,753
