= Ken'yū =

- Gender: Male

Origin
- Origin: Japanese
- Meaning: Different meanings depending on the kanji used

Ken'yū, Kenyu or Kenyuu (written: 賢雄 or 健勇) is a masculine Japanese given name. Notable people with the name include:

- Kenyu Horiuchi (堀内 賢雄) (born 1957), Japanese voice actor
- Kenyu Sugimoto (杉本 健勇) (born 1992), Japanese footballer
