= Hayato Nukui =

Japanese footballer (born 1996)

Hayato Nukui 温井 駿斗
Personal information
- Full name: Hayato Nukui
- Date of birth: 14 November 1996 (age 29)
- Place of birth: Takatsuki, Osaka, Japan
- Height: 1.77 m (5 ft 10 in)
- Position: Defender

Team information
- Current team: Gainare Tottori
- Number: 6

Youth career
- 2003–2008: FC Falcon
- 2009–2011: Takatsuki Daikyu Junior High School
- 2012–2014: Cerezo Osaka

Senior career*
| Years | Team | Apps | (Gls) |
| 2015–2017 | Cerezo Osaka | 0 | (0) |
| 2015 | → Suzuka Unlimited FC (loan) | 5 | (1) |
| 2016–2017 | → Cerezo Osaka U-23 | 50 | (1) |
| 2018–2020 | Tochigi SC | 13 | (0) |
| 2021 | Mito HollyHock | 10 | (1) |
| 2021–2022 | Fujieda MYFC | 19 | (3) |
| 2023 | SC Sagamihara | 14 | (0) |
| 2024- | Gainare Tottori | 83 | (2) |
Medal record
Cerezo Osaka
| Winner | J.League Cup | 2017 |
| Winner | Emperor's Cup | 2017 |
- * Club domestic league appearances and goals as of 24 August 2026

Hayato Nukui (温井 駿斗, Nukui Hayato; born 16 October 1996 in Takatsuki, Osaka) is a Japanese footballer who plays for Gainare Tottori from 2024.

== Career ==
On 21 December 2022, Nukui joined to SC Sagamihara from 2023 season.

== Club statistics ==
Updated to the end 2022 season.

| Club performance | | | League | | Cup | | League Cup | | Total | |
| Season | Club | League | Apps | Goals | Apps | Goals | Apps | Goals | Apps | Goals |
| Japan | | | League | | Emperor's Cup | | J. League Cup | | Total | |
|---|---|---|---|---|---|---|---|---|---|---|
| 2015 | Cerezo Osaka | J2 League | 0 | 0 | – | | – | | 0 | 0 |
| 2015 | Suzuka Unlimited FC | JRL (Tokai) | 5 | 1 | 0 | 0 | – | | 5 | 1 |
| 2016 | Cerezo Osaka | J2 League | 0 | 0 | 0 | 0 | – | | 0 | 0 |
| 2016 | Cerezo Osaka U-23 | J3 League | 29 | 0 | – | | – | | 29 | 0 |
| 2017 | Cerezo Osaka | J1 League | 0 | 0 | 0 | 0 | 0 | 0 | 0 | 0 |
| 2017 | Cerezo Osaka U-23 | J3 League | 21 | 1 | – | | – | | 21 | 1 |
| 2018 | Tochigi SC | J2 League | 8 | 0 | 1 | 0 | – | | 9 | 0 |
| 2019 | Tochigi SC | J2 League | 5 | 0 | 1 | 0 | – | | 6 | 0 |
| 2020 | Tochigi SC | J2 League | 0 | 0 | – | | – | | 0 | 0 |
| 2021 | Mito HollyHock | J2 League | 10 | 1 | 1 | 0 | - | | 11 | 1 |
| 2021 | Fujieda MYFC | J3 League | 14 | 3 | 0 | 0 | - | | 14 | 3 |
| 2022 | Fujieda MYFC | J3 League | 5 | 0 | 0 | 0 | - | | 5 | 0 |
| 2023 | SC Sagamihara | J3 League | 0 | 0 | 0 | 0 | - | | 0 | 0 |
| Career total | | | 92 | 5 | 3 | 0 | 0 | 0 | 95 | 5 |
