= Kaito Hayashida =

Japanese footballer

Personal information
- Date of birth: 29 August 2001 (age 25)
- Place of birth: Hyōgo, Japan
- Height: 1.83 m (6 ft 0 in)
- Position: Defender

Team information
- Current team: Kamatamare Sanuki
- Number: 44

Youth career
- –2016: Cerezo Osaka Nishi
- 2017–2019: Cerezo Osaka

College career
Years	Team	Apps	(Gls)
2020–2023	University of Tsukuba		

Senior career*
Years	Team	Apps	(Gls)
2019	Cerezo Osaka U-23	23	(0)
2024–2026	FC Osaka	19	(0)
2025–2026	→ Kamatamare Sanuki (loan)	30	(0)
2026–	Kamatamare Sanuki	2	(1)

International career^{‡}
2019	Japan U18	1	(0)
- * Club domestic league appearances and goals as of 17 August 2026 ‡ National team caps and goals as of 17:04, 22 July 2020 (UTC)

Kaito Hayashida (林田 魁斗, Hayashida Kaito; born 29 August 2001) is a Japanese footballer who plays as a defender for Kamatamare Sanuki.

== Career statistics ==
=== Club ===
As of 17 June 2024.

Club	Season	League			National Cup		League Cup		Other		Total	
Club	Season	Division	Apps	Goals	Apps	Goals	Apps	Goals	Apps	Goals	Apps	Goals
Cerezo Osaka U-23	2019	J3 League	23	0	–		–		0	0	23	0
FC Osaka	2024	J3 League	6	0	–		1	0	0	0	7	0
Career total			29	0	0	0	1	0	0	0	30	0
