= Hinata Kida =

Japanese association football player

Hinata Kida 喜田 陽
Personal information
- Full name: Hinata Kida
- Date of birth: 4 July 2000 (age 26)
- Place of birth: Osaka, Japan
- Height: 1.71 m (5 ft 7 in)
- Position: Defensive midfielder

Team information
- Current team: JEF United Chiba
- Number: 55

Youth career
- 2010–2018: Cerezo Osaka

Senior career*
Years	Team	Apps	(Gls)
2017–2026	Cerezo Osaka	70	(1)
2017–2020	Cerezo Osaka U-23	69	(0)
2019	→ Avispa Fukuoka (loan)	10	(0)
2026–	JEF United Chiba	2	(0)

International career^{‡}
2017	Japan U17	10	(1)
2019	Japan U20	1	(0)
Medal record
Cerezo Osaka
Winner	J.League Cup	2017
Winner	Emperor's Cup	2017
- * Club domestic league appearances and goals as of 22:46, 6 October 2026 (UTC) ‡ National team caps and goals as of 14 October 2017

Hinata Kida (喜田 陽, Kida Hinata; born 4 July 2000) is a Japanese professional footballer who plays as a defensive midfielder for J1 League club JEF United Chiba.

== Career ==
Kida joined J1 League club Cerezo Osaka in 2017. On 31 December 2020, his contract with the club was extended for the 2021 season. On 27 December 2021, his contract was extended for the 2022 season. On 6 January 2023, Kida's contract was extended for the 2023 season. On 12 January 2024, his contract with the club was extended for the 2024 season.

== Career statistics ==
As of 6 October 2026.

Appearances and goals by club, season and competition
Club	Season	League			National cup (Note: Includes Emperor's Cup)		League cup (Note: Includes J.League Cup)		Continental		Total	
Club	Season	Division	Apps	Goals	Apps	Goals	Apps	Goals	Apps	Goals	Apps	Goals
Cerezo Osaka	2017	J1 League	0	0	0	0	0	0	0	0	0	0
Cerezo Osaka	2018	J1 League	0	0	0	0	0	0	0	0	0	0
Cerezo Osaka	2020	J1 League	1	0	0	0	0	0	0	0	1	0
Cerezo Osaka	2021	J1 League	6	0	4	0	2	0	3 (Note: Appearances in AFC Champions League Elite)	0	15	0
Cerezo Osaka	2022	J1 League	1	0	1	0	1	0	0	0	3	0
Cerezo Osaka	2023	J1 League	16	1	2	0	4	0	0	0	22	1
Cerezo Osaka	2024	J1 League	9	0	0	0	0	0	0	0	9	0
Cerezo Osaka	2025	J1 League	30	0	3	0	4	0	0	0	37	0
Cerezo Osaka	2026	J1 (100)	6	0	–		–		0	0	6	0
Cerezo Osaka	2026–27	J1 League	1	0	0	0	0	0	0	0	1	0
Cerezo Osaka	Total		70	1	10	0	12	0	3	0	95	1
Cerezo Osaka U-23 (loan)	2017	J3 League	16	0	–		–		–		16	0
Cerezo Osaka U-23 (loan)	2018	J3 League	26	0	–		–		–		26	0
Cerezo Osaka U-23 (loan)	2020	J3 League	27	0	–		–		–		27	0
Cerezo Osaka U-23 (loan)	Total		69	0	0	0	0	0	0	0	69	0
Avispa Fukuoka (loan)	2019	J2 League	10	0	2	0	–		–		12	0
JEF United Chiba	2026–27	J1 League	2	0	0	0	0	0	–		2	0
Career total			151	1	12	0	12	0	3	0	178	1
