= Ryudai Maeda =

Japanese footballer

Personal information
- Date of birth: 20 May 2002 (age 24)
- Place of birth: Osaka, Japan
- Height: 1.69 m (5 ft 7 in)
- Position: Midfielder

Team information
- Current team: Cerezo Osaka

Youth career
- Izumishi FC
- –: Cerezo Osaka

Senior career*
Years	Team	Apps	(Gls)
2020	Cerezo Osaka U-23	31	(3)
- * Club domestic league appearances and goals as of 17:04, 17 March 2021 (UTC)

Ryudai Maeda (前田 龍大, Maeda Ryudai; born 20 May 2002) is a Japanese footballer currently playing as a midfielder for Cerezo Osaka.

== Career statistics ==
=== Club ===
As of 17 March 2021.

Club	Season	League			National Cup		League Cup		Other		Total	
Club	Season	Division	Apps	Goals	Apps	Goals	Apps	Goals	Apps	Goals	Apps	Goals
Cerezo Osaka U-23	2020	J3 League	31	3	–		–		0	0	31	3
Career total			31	3	0	0	0	0	0	0	31	3
