= Musashi Oyama =

Japanese footballer

Personal information
- Full name: Musashi Oyama
- Date of birth: September 11, 1998 (age 28)
- Place of birth: Hokkaido, Japan
- Height: 1.67 m (5 ft 5 1/2 in)
- Position: Right winger

Team information
- Current team: Kataller Toyama
- Number: 20

Youth career
- Realizzare FC
- –2013: Sapporo JFC
- 2014–2016: Sapporo Otani High School

Senior career*
Years	Team	Apps	(Gls)
2017–2019	Cerezo Osaka	0	(0)
2017–2019	Cerezo Osaka U-23	41	(0)
2020–2021	FC Osaka	35	(3)
2021–	Kataller Toyama	46	(2)
Medal record
Cerezo Osaka
Winner	J.League Cup	2017
Winner	Emperor's Cup	2017
- * Club domestic league appearances and goals as of 1 January 2026

Musashi Oyama (大山 武蔵, Oyama Musashi; born September 11, 1998) is a Japanese football player who plays for Kataller Toyama.

== Career ==
Musashi Oyama joined J1 League club Cerezo Osaka in 2017.

== Reserves performance ==
Last Updated: 28 February 2019

Club performance			League		Total	
Season	Club	League	Apps	Goals	Apps	Goals
Japan			League		Total	
2017	Cerezo Osaka U-23	J3	25	0	25	0
2018	Cerezo Osaka U-23	J3	16	0	16	0
Career total			41	0	41	0
