= Masaki Okino =

Japanese footballer

Masaki Okino 沖野 将基

Personal information
- Full name: Masaki Okino
- Date of birth: December 13, 1996 (age 29)
- Place of birth: Ōmura, Nagasaki, Japan
- Height: 1.65 m (5 ft 5 in)
- Position: Midfielder

Youth career
- 2012–2014: Cerezo Osaka

Senior career*
Years	Team	Apps	(Gls)
2015–2018	Cerezo Osaka	2	(0)
2016–2018	→ Cerezo Osaka U-23 (loan)	78	(4)
2019–2023	Blaublitz Akita	110	(7)
Total		190	(11)
Medal record
Cerezo Osaka
Winner	J.League Cup	2017
Winner	Emperor's Cup	2017
- * Club domestic league appearances and goals

Masaki Okino (沖野 将基, Okino Masaki; born December 13, 1996 in Ōmura, Nagasaki) is a Japanese former footballer who played as a midfielder. In 2022 he ruptured his achilles tendon in the second game of the season and was ruled out for the remainder of the year. His contract with Blaublitz Akita expired at the end of the 2023 season.

== Club statistics ==
Appearances and goals by club, season and competition
Club	Season	League			National cup (Note: Includes Emperor's Cup)		Total	
Club	Season	Division	Apps	Goals	Apps	Goals	Apps	Goals
Cerezo Osaka	2015	J2 League	2	0	–		2	0
Cerezo Osaka U-23 (loan)	2016	J3 League	28	2	–		28	2
Cerezo Osaka U-23 (loan)	2017	J3 League	27	1	–		27	1
Cerezo Osaka U-23 (loan)	2018	J3 League	23	1	–		23	1
Cerezo Osaka U-23 (loan)	Total		78	4	0	0	78	4
Blaublitz Akita	2019	J3 League	26	0	0	0	26	0
Blaublitz Akita	2020	J3 League	32	5	2	0	34	5
Blaublitz Akita	2021	J2 League	36	2	0	0	36	2
Blaublitz Akita	2022	J2 League	2	0	0	0	2	0
Blaublitz Akita	2023	J2 League	14	0	1	0	15	0
Blaublitz Akita	Total		110	7	3	0	113	7
Career total			190	11	3	0	193	11

== Honours ==
Blaublitz Akita

- J3 League (1): 2020
