= Toshiki Onozawa =

Japanese footballer

Toshiki Onozawa 斧澤 隼輝
Personal information
- Full name: Toshiki Onozawa
- Date of birth: June 2, 1998 (age 28)
- Place of birth: Nagasaki, Japan
- Height: 1.66 m (5 ft 5 1/2 in)
- Position: Midfielder

Team information
- Current team: FC Tiamo Hirakata
- Number: 26

Youth career
- Cerezo Osaka

Senior career*
Years	Team	Apps	(Gls)
2017–2019	Cerezo Osaka	6	(0)
2016–2019	→ Cerezo Osaka U-23	119	(15)
2020–2022	Giravanz Kitakyushu	27	(0)
2022-	FC Tiamo Hirakata	31	(4)
Total		183	(19)
Medal record
Cerezo Osaka
Winner	J.League Cup	2017
Winner	Emperor's Cup	2017
- * Club domestic league appearances and goals as of 26/1/24 @ 15:39(AEST)

Toshiki Onozawa (斧澤 隼輝, Onozawa Toshiki; born June 2, 1998) is a Japanese football player. He plays for Giravanz Kitakyushu.

== Career ==
Toshiki Onozawa joined Cerezo Osaka in 2016. On March 13, he debuted in J3 League (v Grulla Morioka).

== Club statistics ==
Updated to 22 February 2020.

Club performance			League		Cup		League Cup		Total	
Season	Club	League	Apps	Goals	Apps	Goals	Apps	Goals	Apps	Goals
Japan			League		Emperor's Cup		Emperor's Cup		Total	
2016	Cerezo Osaka U-23	J3 League	28	1	–		–		28	1
2016	Cerezo Osaka	J1 League	0	0	0	0	5	0	5	0
2016	Cerezo Osaka U-23	J3 League	27	5	–		–		27	5
2018	Cerezo Osaka	J1 League	0	0	0	0	0	0	0	0
2018	Cerezo Osaka U-23	J3 League	31	4	–		–		31	4
2019	Cerezo Osaka	J1 League	0	0	0	0	0	0	0	0
2019	Cerezo Osaka U-23	J3 League	33	5	–		–		33	5
Total			119	15	0	0	5	0	124	15
