= Kenyu Sugimoto =

Japanese footballer (born 1992)

Kenyu Sugimoto 杉本 健勇
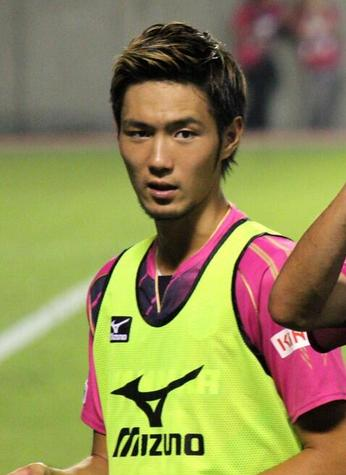
- Sugimoto in 2013

Personal information
- Date of birth: 18 November 1992 (age 33)
- Place of birth: Ikuno-ku, Osaka, Japan
- Height: 1.87 m (6 ft 2 in)
- Position: Forward

Team information
- Current team: RB Omiya Ardija
- Number: 23

Youth career
- 2001–2005: FC Ruy Ramos Vejitto
- 2005–2010: Cerezo Osaka

Senior career*
Years	Team	Apps	(Gls)
2010–2014	Cerezo Osaka	89	(11)
2012	→ Tokyo Verdy (loan)	18	(5)
2015	Kawasaki Frontale	24	(6)
2016–2018	Cerezo Osaka	105	(41)
2019–2022	Urawa Red Diamonds	70	(6)
2021	→ Yokohama F. Marinos (loan)	11	(3)
2022	→ Júbilo Iwata (loan)	30	(1)
2023–2024	Júbilo Iwata	4	(0)
2023	→ Yokohama F. Marinos (loan)	8	(1)
2024	→ Omiya Ardija (loan)	34	(10)
2025–	RB Omiya Ardija	53	(8)

International career
2007–2009	Japan U17	11	(9)
2011–2012	Japan U23	5	(2)
2017–2018	Japan	8	(1)
- * Club domestic league appearances and goals as of 21:05, 10 June 2026 (UTC)

Kenyu Sugimoto (杉本 健勇, Sugimoto Kenyū; born 18 November 1992) is a Japanese professional footballer who plays as a forward for J2 League club RB Omiya Ardija.

== Club career ==
On 9 January 2024, Sugimoto joined J3 League club Omiya Ardija on loan for the 2024 season.

On 25 December 2024, Sugimoto joined RB Omiya on a permanent basis.

== International career ==
In October 2009, Sugimoto was elected Japan U-17 national team for 2009 U-17 World Cup. He played all 3 matches and scored a goal against Brazil in the first match. In October 2102, he was elected Japan U-23 national team for 2012 Summer Olympics. He played four matches and Japan won the 4th place.

In September 2017, Sugimoto was elected Japan national team for 2018 World Cup qualification. At this qualification, on 5 September, he debuted against Saudi Arabia.

== Career statistics ==
=== Club ===
As of match played 17 May 2026

Appearances and goals by club, season and competition
Club	Season	League			Emperor's Cup		J.League Cup		Continental		Other		Total	
Club	Season	Division	Apps	Goals	Apps	Goals	Apps	Goals	Apps	Goals	Apps	Goals	Apps	Goals
Cerezo Osaka	2011	J.League Div 1	15	2	4	1	—		1 (Note: Appearance(s) in AFC Champions League)	0	—		20	3
Cerezo Osaka	2012	J.League Div 1	12	1	4	4	—		—		—		16	5
Cerezo Osaka	2013	J.League Div 1	30	3	3	4	6	0	—		—		39	7
Cerezo Osaka	2014	J.League Div 1	32	5	4	1	2	0	7	0	—		45	6
Cerezo Osaka	Total		89	11	15	10	8	0	8	0	0	0	120	21
Tokyo Verdy (loan)	2012	J.League Div 2	18	5	0	0	—		—		—		18	5
Kawasaki Frontale	2015	J1 League	24	6	2	1	6	1	—		—		32	8
Cerezo Osaka	2016	J2 League	43	14	3	6	—		—		—		46	20
Cerezo Osaka	2017	J1 League	34	22	1	0	1	1	—		—		36	23
Cerezo Osaka	2018	J1 League	30	5	2	0	0	0	4	1	1 (Note: Appearance in Japanese Super Cup)	0	37	6
Cerezo Osaka	Total		107	41	6	6	1	1	4	1	1	0	119	49
Urawa Red Diamonds	2019	J1 League	21	2	3	0	2	0	7	1	1	0	34	3
Urawa Red Diamonds	2020	J1 League	33	2	—		2	0	—		—		35	2
Urawa Red Diamonds	2021	J1 League	16	2	1	0	7	2	—		—		24	2
Urawa Red Diamonds	Total		70	4	4	0	11	2	7	1	1	0	93	7
Yokohama F. Marinos (loan)	2021	J1 League	11	3	0	0	0	0	—		—		11	3
Júbilo Iwata (loan)	2022	J1 League	30	1	1	0	4	0	—		—		35	1
Júbilo Iwata	2023	J2 League	4	0	0	0	1	0	—		—		5	0
Júbilo Iwata	Total		34	1	1	0	5	0	0	0	0	0	40	1
Yokohama F. Marinos (loan)	2023	J1 League	8	1	2	0	0	0	3	1	—		13	2
Omiya Ardija (loan)	2024	J3 League	34	10	1	0	0	0	—		—		35	10
RB Omiya Ardija	2025	J2 League	36	6	1	0	1	1	—		1 (Note: Appearance in J2 League promotion play-offs)	0	39	7
RB Omiya Ardija	2026	J2/J3	17	2	—		—		—		—		17	2
RB Omiya Ardija	Total		87	18	2	0	1	1	0	0	1	0	91	19
Career total			446	92	33	18	31	7	22	3	3	0	535	120

=== International ===
Appearances and goals by national team and year
National team	Year	Apps	Goals
Japan
Japan	2017	5	1
Japan	2018	3	0
Total		8	1

Scores and results list Japan's goal tally first, score column indicates score after each Sugimoto goal.

List of international goals scored by Kenyu Sugimoto
No.	Date	Venue	Opponent	Score	Result	Competition
1	10 October 2017	International Stadium Yokohama, Yokohama, Japan	Haiti	2–0	3–3	2017 Kirin Challenge Cup

== Honours ==
Cerezo Osaka

- J.League Cup: 2017

RB Omiya Ardija

- J3 League: 2024

Individual

- J.League Best XI: 2017
- J. League Cup MVP: 2017
- J1 League Monthly MVP: July 2017
- J3 League Best XI: 2024
