= Honoya Shoji =

Japanese footballer

Honoya Shoji 庄司 朋乃也
Personal information
- Full name: Honoya Shoji
- Date of birth: 8 October 1997 (age 29)
- Place of birth: Gunma, Japan
- Height: 1.87 m (6 ft 2 in)
- Position: Centre back

Team information
- Current team: Zweigen Kanazawa
- Number: 39

Youth career
- 2013–2015: Cerezo Osaka

Senior career*
| Years | Team | Apps | (Gls) |
| 2016–2022 | Cerezo Osaka | 1 | (0) |
| 2016–2017 | → Cerezo Osaka U-23 | 23 | (0) |
| 2017–2018 | → Zweigen Kanazawa (loan) | 63 | (1) |
| 2019 | → Oita Trinita (loan) | 6 | (0) |
| 2020 | → V-Varen Nagasaki (loan) | 7 | (0) |
| 2021 | → Zweigen Kanazawa (loan) | 35 | (3) |
| 2022– | Zweigen Kanazawa | 113 | (8) |

International career
| 2015 | Japan U18 | 5 | (0) |
| 2017–2018 | Japan U23 | 3 | (0) |
Medal record
Cerezo Osaka
| Winner | J.League Cup | 2017 |
| Winner | Emperor's Cup | 2017 |
- * Club domestic league appearances and goals as of 1 January 2026

Honoya Shoji (庄司 朋乃也, Shoji Honoya; born 8 October 1997 in Gunma) is a Japanese footballer who plays for Zweigen Kanazawa.

== Club statistics ==
Updated to 25 February 2019.

| Club performance | | | League | | Cup | | League Cup | | Total | |
| Season | Club | League | Apps | Goals | Apps | Goals | Apps | Goals | Apps | Goals |
| Japan | | | League | | Emperor's Cup | | J. League Cup | | Total | |
|---|---|---|---|---|---|---|---|---|---|---|
| 2016 | Cerezo Osaka | J2 League | 0 | 0 | 0 | 0 | – | | 0 | 0 |
| 2016 | Cerezo Osaka U-23 | J3 League | 16 | 0 | – | | – | | 16 | 0 |
| 2017 | Cerezo Osaka | J2 League | 0 | 0 | – | | 3 | 0 | 3 | 0 |
| 2017 | Cerezo Osaka U-23 | J3 League | 7 | 0 | – | | – | | 7 | 0 |
| 2017 | Zweigen Kanazawa | J2 League | 22 | 0 | 0 | 0 | – | | 22 | 0 |
| 2018 | Zweigen Kanazawa | J2 League | 41 | 1 | 2 | 0 | – | | 43 | 1 |
| Career total | | | 86 | 1 | 2 | 0 | 3 | 0 | 48 | 0 |
