= Takaya Yoshinare =

Japanese footballer

Takaya Yoshinare 吉馴 空矢
Personal information
- Date of birth: 7 June 2001 (age 25)
- Place of birth: Osaka, Japan
- Height: 1.68 m (5 ft 6 in)
- Position: Right back

Team information
- Current team: FC Osaka
- Number: 22

Youth career
- FC Suerte Niwashirodai
- 2014–2021: Cerezo Osaka

Senior career*
Years	Team	Apps	(Gls)
2019–2020	Cerezo Osaka U-23	42	(1)
2021–2022	Cerezo Osaka	0	(0)
2021	→ Kamatamare Sanuki (loan)	6	(0)
2022	→ FC Osaka (loan)	2	(0)
2023–	FC Osaka	0	(0)
- * Club domestic league appearances and goals as of 18 December 2022, 16:05 (UTC)

Takaya Yoshinare (吉馴 空矢, Yoshinare Takaya; born 7 June 2001) is a Japanese footballer currently playing as a right back for FC Osaka.

== Career ==
In 2019, Yoshinare begin first career with Cerezo Osaka U-23 due to campaign J3 League for 2019 season.

In 2021, Yoshinare signed first professional contract with J1 club, Cerezo Osaka. On 18 January 2021, he was loaned out to J3 club, Kamatamare Sanuki for a season.

On 17 January 2022, Yoshinare loaned again to JFL club, FC Osaka for 2022 season. On 20 November at same year, he brought his club promotion to J3 League for the first time in history. On 20 December at same year, Yoshinare agreement permanently transfer to FC Osaka for upcoming 2023 season.

== Career statistics ==
=== Club ===
As of the start from 2023 season.

Club	Season	League			National Cup		League Cup		Continental		Other		Total	
Club	Season	Division	Apps	Goals	Apps	Goals	Apps	Goals	Apps	Goals	Apps	Goals	Apps	Goals
Cerezo Osaka U-23	2019	J3 League	16	0	–		–		–		0	0	16	0
Cerezo Osaka U-23	2020	J3 League	26	1	–		–		–		0	0	26	1
Cerezo Osaka U-23	Total		42	1	0	0	0	0	0	0	0	0	42	1
Cerezo Osaka	2021	J1 League	0	0	0	0	0	0	0	0	0	0	0	0
Kamatamare Sanuki (loan)	2021	J3 League	6	0	0	0	–		–		0	0	6	0
FC Osaka (loan)	2022	Japan Football League	2	0	0	0	–		–		0	0	2	0
FC Osaka	2023	J3 League	0	0	0	0	–		–		0	0	0	0
FC Osaka	Total		8	0	0	0	0	0	0	0	0	0	8	0
Career total			50	1	0	0	0	0	0	0	0	0	50	1
