= Ryūya Nishio =

Japanese footballer (born 2001)

Ryūya Nishio 西尾 隆矢
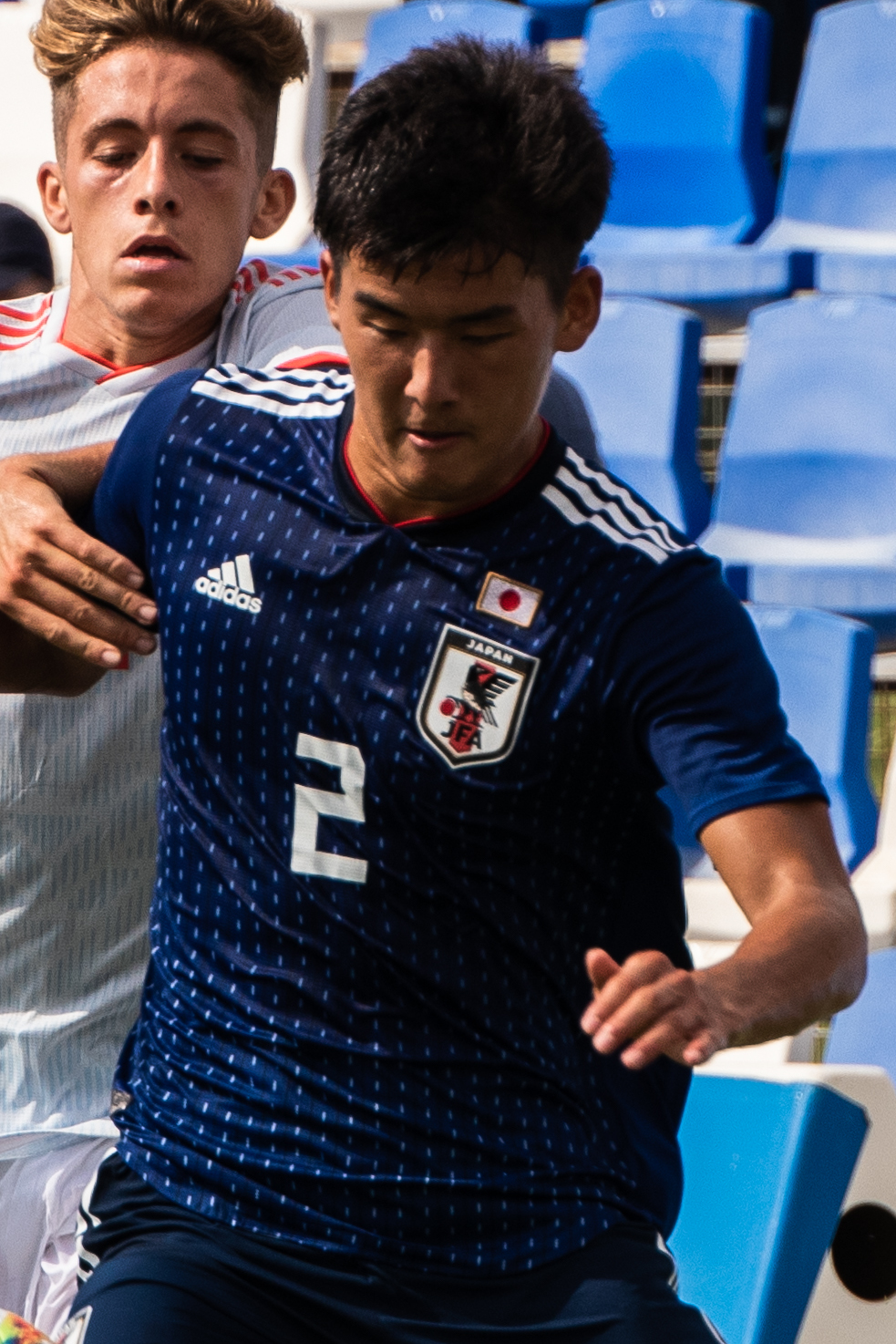
- Nishio playing for Japan U19 in 2019

Personal information
- Full name: Ryūya Nishio
- Date of birth: 16 May 2001 (age 25)
- Place of birth: Osaka, Japan
- Height: 1.80 m (5 ft 11 in)
- Position: Centre back

Team information
- Current team: RB Omiya Ardija
- Number: 88

Youth career
- 2009–2013: FC Grasion
- 2014–2019: Cerezo Osaka

Senior career*
Years	Team	Apps	(Gls)
2018–2025	Cerezo Osaka	118	(4)
2018–2020	→ Cerezo Osaka U-23 (loan)	53	(1)
2026–	RB Omiya Ardija	18	(0)

International career
2016	Japan U15	4	(1)
2019	Japan U18	2	(0)
2019	Japan U19	2	(0)
2022	Japan U20	1	(0)
2022–2023	Japan U21	4	(0)
2023–2024	Japan U23	7	(1)
2024	Japan Olympic	4	(0)
Medal record
Men's football
Representing Japan
AFC U-23 Asian Cup
Gold medal – first place	2024 Qatar	Team
- * Club domestic league appearances and goals as of 21:31, 10 June 2026 (UTC)

Ryūya Nishio (西尾 隆矢, Nishio Ryūya; born 16 May 2001) is a Japanese professional footballer who plays as a centre back for J2 League club RB Omiya Ardija.

== Career ==
Nishio was born in Osaka Prefecture on 16 May 2001. He joined J1 League club Cerezo Osaka from youth team in 2018.

== International career ==
On 4 April 2024, Nishio was called up to the Japan U23 squad for the 2024 AFC U-23 Asian Cup.

== Career statistics ==
As of match played 30 May 2026

Appearances and goals by club, season and competition
Club	Season	League			Emperor's Cup		J.League Cup		Continental		Total	
Club	Season	Division	Apps	Goals	Apps	Goals	Apps	Goals	Apps	Goals	Apps	Goals
Cerezo Osaka U-23 (loan)	2018	J3 League	2	0	—		—		—		2	0
Cerezo Osaka U-23 (loan)	2019	J3 League	26	0	—		—		—		26	0
Cerezo Osaka U-23 (loan)	2020	J3 League	25	1	—		—		—		25	1
Cerezo Osaka U-23 (loan)	Total		53	1	—		—		—		53	1
Cerezo Osaka	2020	J1 League	0	0	0	0	0	0	0	0	0	0
Cerezo Osaka	2021	J1 League	31	2	4	0	5	0	5 (Note: Appearances in AFC Champions League Elite)	0	45	2
Cerezo Osaka	2022	J1 League	24	0	1	0	5	0	0	0	30	0
Cerezo Osaka	2023	J1 League	9	0	2	0	4	0	0	0	15	0
Cerezo Osaka	2024	J1 League	29	2	1	0	1	0	0	0	31	2
Cerezo Osaka	2025	J1 League	25	0	3	0	4	0	0	0	32	0
Cerezo Osaka	Total		118	4	11	0	19	0	5	0	153	4
RB Omiya Ardija	2026	J2/J3 (100)	18	0	—		—		—		18	0
Career total			189	5	11	0	19	0	5	0	224	5

== Honours ==
Japan U23

- AFC U-23 Asian Cup: 2024
