= Tatsuya Tabira =

Japanese footballer

Tatsuya Tabira 田平 起也
Personal information
- Date of birth: 10 May 2001 (age 25)
- Place of birth: Osaka, Japan
- Height: 1.88 m (6 ft 2 in)
- Position: Defender

Youth career
- Nagaike Tsubasa FC Futures
- 2014–2016: Cerezo Osaka
- 2017–2019: Kobe Koryo Gakuen High School

Senior career*
Years	Team	Apps	(Gls)
2020	Cerezo Osaka U-23	22	(1)
2021–2024	Cerezo Osaka	0	(0)
2022–2024	→ Iwate Grulla Morioka (loan)	18	(1)
2024	Mito HollyHock	2	(0)
Total		37	(1)

International career
2019	Japan U18	1	(0)
2020	Japan U19		
- * Club domestic league appearances and goals

Tatsuya Tabira (田平 起也, Tabira Tatsuya; born 10 May 2001) is a Japanese former footballer who played as a defender. Tabira retired at the end of the 2024 season, aged 23.

== Career statistics ==
Appearances and goals by club, season and competition
Club	Season	League			National cup (Note: Includes Emperor's Cup)		League cup (Note: Includes J.League Cup)		Total	
Club	Season	Division	Apps	Goals	Apps	Goals	Apps	Goals	Apps	Goals
Cerezo Osaka U-23	2019	J3 League	0	0	–		–		0	0
Cerezo Osaka U-23	2020	J3 League	22	1	–		–		22	1
Cerezo Osaka U-23	Total		22	1	0	0	0	0	22	1
Cerezo Osaka	2020	J1 League	0	0	–		0	0	0	0
Iwate Grulla Morioka (loan)	2021	J3 League	1	0	1	1	–		2	1
Iwate Grulla Morioka (loan)	2022	J2 League	10	0	1	0	–		11	0
Iwate Grulla Morioka (loan)	2023	J3 League	3	0	2	0	–		5	0
Iwate Grulla Morioka (loan)	Total		14	0	4	1	0	0	18	1
Mito HollyHock	2024	J2 League	1	0	0	0	1	0	2	0
Career total			37	1	4	1	1	0	42	2
