= Ken Tokura =

Japanese footballer

Ken Tokura 都倉 賢
Personal information
- Full name: Ken Tokura
- Date of birth: 16 June 1986 (age 40)
- Place of birth: Shibuya, Tokyo, Japan
- Height: 1.87 m (6 ft 2 in)
- Position: Forward

Team information
- Current team: Tochigi City FC (on loan from Iwate Grulla Morioka)
- Number: 9

Youth career
- 1999–2001: Yokohama F. Marinos
- 2002–2004: Kawasaki Frontale

Senior career*
Years	Team	Apps	(Gls)
2005–2008	Kawasaki Frontale	6	(0)
2008–2009	Thespa Kusatsu	57	(26)
2010–2013	Vissel Kobe	81	(14)
2014–2018	Hokkaido Consadole Sapporo (Note: Consadole Sapporo change name to Hokkaido Consadole Sapporo from 2016 season)	171	(67)
2019–2020	Cerezo Osaka	25	(2)
2021–2023	V-Varen Nagasaki	85	(11)
2024–	Iwate Grulla Morioka	24	(2)
2025–	→ Tochigi City FC (loan)	9	(1)
Medal record
Kawasaki Frontale
Runner-up	J1 League	2006
Runner-up	J1 League	2008
Runner-up	J.League Cup	2007
Hokkaido Consadole Sapporo
Winner	J2 League	2016
Runner-up	J.League Cup	2019
- * Club domestic league appearances and goals as of 1 January 2026

Ken Tokura (都倉 賢, Tokura Ken; born 16 June 1986 in Shibuya, Tokyo) is a Japanese football player who plays as a Forward and currently play for J2 League club, Tochigi City FC, on loan from Iwate Grulla Morioka.

== Early life ==
Ken was born in Shibuya. He played youth football with Yokohama F. Marinos and Kawasaki Frontale.

== Career ==
Ken started his career with Kawasaki Frontale. He stayed with them for a few years before joining Thespa. His time at Thespa was successful in the 2009 season, scoring 23 goals in 43 games in the league. He joined Vissel Kobe shortly after. On 30 June 2012, Tokura scored a long-distance goal from outside the penalty box and celebrated his goal with a "Mario Balotelli-style" celebration, which resembles the celebration after Balotelli's second goal against Germany in Euro 2012 Semi Final. He was then given a yellow card by the referee.

Ken joined Consadole Sapporo a few years later.

He joined Cerezo a few years later. He made his debut for Cerezo against Vissel Kobe, coming on in the 65th minute for Kota Mizunuma. He scored his first goal for the club against Vegalta Sendai, scoring in the 35th minute.

Ken joined V-Varen Nagasaki after Cerezo. He made his debut for V-Varen against Zweigen Kanazawa, coming on in the 67th minute for Cayman Togashi. He scored his first goal for V-Varen in the 87th minute against Renofa Yamaguchi.

In 2024, Tokura joined to J3 club, Iwate Grulla Morioka.

On 13 December 2024, Tokura joined to newly promoted J3 club, Tochigi City FC on loan from 2025 season.

== Career statistics ==
=== Club ===
As of the match played 15 February 2025.

Club performance			League		Cup		League Cup		Continental		Total	
Season	Club	League	Apps	Goals	Apps	Goals	Apps	Goals	Apps	Goals	Apps	Goals
Japan			League		Emperor's Cup		League Cup		AFC		Total	
2005	Kawasaki Frontale	J.League Div 1	3	0	0	0	1	0	-		4	0
2006	Kawasaki Frontale	J.League Div 1	0	0	0	0	0	0	-		0	0
2007	Kawasaki Frontale	J.League Div 1	2	0	0	0	0	0	0	0	2	0
2008	Kawasaki Frontale	J.League Div 1	1	0	-		0	0	-		1	0
2008	Thespa Kusatsu	J.League Div 2	14	3	1	0	-		-		15	3
2009	Thespa Kusatsu	J.League Div 2	43	23	2	2	-		-		45	25
2010	Vissel Kobe	J.League Div 1	19	4	2	0	5	1	-		26	5
2011	Vissel Kobe	J.League Div 1	14	2	0	0	1	0	-		15	2
2012	Vissel Kobe	J.League Div 1	25	6	1	0	4	0	-		30	6
2013	Vissel Kobe	J.League Div 2	23	2	1	0	-		-		24	2
2014	Consadole Sapporo	J.League Div 2	37	14	1	1	-		-		38	15
2015	Consadole Sapporo	J2 League	34	13	0	0	-		-		34	13
2016	Hokkaido Consadole Sapporo	J2 League	40	19	1	1	-		-		41	20
2017	Hokkaido Consadole Sapporo	J1 League	30	9	0	0	5	1	-		35	10
2018	Hokkaido Consadole Sapporo	J1 League	30	12	2	2	2	0	-		34	14
2019	Cerezo Osaka	J1 League	11	1	-		1	0	-		12	1
2020	Cerezo Osaka	J1 League	14	1	-		2	0	-		16	1
2021	V-Varen Nagasaki	J2 League	37	7	1	0	-				38	7
2022	V-Varen Nagasaki	J2 League	27	3	1	0	-				28	3
2023	V-Varen Nagasaki	J2 League	22	1	1	0	-				23	1
2024	Iwate Grulla Morioka	J3 League	24	2	1	1	2	0	-		27	2
2025	Tochigi City FC (loan)	J3 League	1	0	0	0	0	0	-		1	0
Career total			451	122	15	7	23	2	0	0	489	131
