= Towa Yamane =

Japanese footballer

Towa Yamane 山根 永遠
Personal information
- Full name: Towa Yamane
- Date of birth: February 5, 1999 (age 27)
- Place of birth: Hiroshima, Japan
- Height: 1.67 m (5 ft 5 1/2 in)
- Position: Forward

Team information
- Current team: Fagiano Okayama
- Number: 88

Youth career
- –2016: Sanfrecce Hiroshima

Senior career*
| Years | Team | Apps | (Gls) |
| 2017–2022 | Cerezo Osaka | 0 | (0) |
| 2017–2019 | → Cerezo Osaka U-23 (loan) | 71 | (13) |
| 2019–2021 | → Zweigen Kanazawa (loan) | 38 | (7) |
| 2021 | → Mito HollyHock (loan) | 34 | (2) |
| 2022 | Thespakusatsu Gunma | 23 | (2) |
| 2022–2025 | Yokohama FC | 102 | (4) |
| 2026– | Fagiano Okayama | 19 | (2) |
Medal record
Cerezo Osaka
| Winner | J.League Cup | 2017 |
| Winner | Emperor's Cup | 2017 |
- * Club domestic league appearances and goals as of 12 August 2026

Towa Yamane (山根 永遠, Yamane Towa; born February 5, 1999) is a Japanese footballer who plays as a forward for J1 League club Fagiano Okayama. His father is Iwao Yamane.

== Career ==
Towa Yamane joined J1 League club Cerezo Osaka in 2017. On 27 June 2019, Yamane was loaned out to Zweigen Kanazawa.

== Club statistics ==
As of 26 March 2026.

Appearances and goals by club, season and competition
| Club | Season | League | | | National cup (Note: Includes Emperors Cup) | | League cup (Note: Includes J.League Cup) | | Total | |
| Club | Season | Division | Apps | Goals | Apps | Goals | Apps | Goals | Apps | Goals |
|---|---|---|---|---|---|---|---|---|---|---|
| Cerezo Osaka U-23 (loan) | 2017 | J3 League | 27 | 3 | – | | – | | 27 | 3 |
| Cerezo Osaka U-23 (loan) | 2018 | J3 League | 31 | 5 | – | | – | | 31 | 5 |
| Cerezo Osaka U-23 (loan) | 2019 | J3 League | 13 | 5 | – | | – | | 13 | 5 |
| Cerezo Osaka U-23 (loan) | Total | | 71 | 13 | 0 | 0 | 0 | 0 | 71 | 13 |
| Zweigen Kanazawa (loan) | 2019 | J2 League | 14 | 4 | – | | – | | 14 | 4 |
| Zweigen Kanazawa (loan) | 2020 | J2 League | 24 | 3 | – | | – | | 24 | 3 |
| Zweigen Kanazawa (loan) | Total | | 38 | 7 | 0 | 0 | 0 | 0 | 38 | 7 |
| Mito Hollyhock (loan) | 2021 | J2 League | 34 | 2 | 1 | 0 | – | | 35 | 2 |
| Thespakusatsu Gunma | 2022 | J2 League | 23 | 2 | 2 | 0 | – | | 25 | 2 |
| Yokohama FC | 2022 | J2 League | 12 | 0 | 0 | 0 | 0 | 0 | 12 | 0 |
| Yokohama FC | 2023 | J1 League | 24 | 0 | 1 | 0 | 2 | 0 | 27 | 0 |
| Yokohama FC | 2024 | J2 League | 36 | 3 | 0 | 0 | 0 | 0 | 36 | 3 |
| Yokohama FC | 2025 | J1 League | 30 | 1 | 0 | 0 | 6 | 1 | 36 | 2 |
| Yokohama FC | Total | | 102 | 4 | 1 | 0 | 8 | 1 | 111 | 5 |
| Fagiano Okayama | 2026 | J1 (100) | 8 | 1 | – | | – | | 8 | 1 |
| Career total | | | 276 | 29 | 4 | 0 | 8 | 1 | 288 | 30 |
