= 2015 Kawasaki Frontale season =

Kawasaki Frontale
2015 season
- Manager: Yahiro Kazama
- Stadium: Kawasaki Todoroki Stadium
- J1 League: 6th

The 2015 Kawasaki Frontale season saw the club compete in the J1 League, the top league of Japanese football, in which they finished 6th.

== J1 League ==
=== League table ===
Pos	Team	Pld	W	D	L	GF	GA	GD	Pts	Qualification or relegation
4	FC Tokyo	34	19	6	9	45	33	+12	63	Champions League qualifying play-off (Note: The winner of the 2015 Emperor's Cup qualified for the Group Stage of the 2016 AFC Champions League. Since the Emperor's Cup winner was Gamba Osaka who were the third-placed team, the qualifying play-off spot was awarded to the fourth-placed team.)
5	Kashima Antlers	34	18	5	11	57	41	+16	59	
6	Kawasaki Frontale	34	17	6	11	62	48	+14	57	
7	Yokohama F. Marinos	34	15	10	9	45	32	+13	55	
8	Shonan Bellmare	34	13	9	12	40	44	−4	48	

Updated to match(es) played on 28 November 2015. Source: Meiji Yasuda J1 League Standings
Rules for classification: 1) Points; 2) Goal difference; 3) Goals scored

=== Match details ===
J1 League match details
Match	Date	Team	Score	Team	Venue	Attendance
1–1	7 March 2015	Yokohama F. Marinos	1–3	Kawasaki Frontale	Nissan Stadium	38,123
1–2	14 March 2015	Kawasaki Frontale	2–2	Vissel Kobe	Kawasaki Todoroki Stadium	21,689
1–3	22 March 2015	Montedio Yamagata	1–0	Kawasaki Frontale	ND Soft Stadium Yamagata	12,081
1–4	4 April 2015	Kawasaki Frontale	4–1	Albirex Niigata	Kawasaki Todoroki Stadium	17,643
1–5	12 April 2015	Kawasaki Frontale	1–1	Urawa Reds	Kawasaki Todoroki Stadium	24,992
1–6	18 April 2015	Vegalta Sendai	2–3	Kawasaki Frontale	Yurtec Stadium Sendai	13,644
1–7	25 April 2015	Kawasaki Frontale	3–0	Ventforet Kofu	Kawasaki Todoroki Stadium	16,953
1–8	29 April 2015	Kawasaki Frontale	1–4	Kashiwa Reysol	Kawasaki Todoroki Stadium	20,961
1–9	2 May 2015	FC Tokyo	2–1	Kawasaki Frontale	Ajinomoto Stadium	42,604
1–10	6 May 2015	Kawasaki Frontale	0–1	Sanfrecce Hiroshima	Kawasaki Todoroki Stadium	21,141
1–11	10 May 2015	Nagoya Grampus	0–1	Kawasaki Frontale	Toyota Stadium	16,952
1–12	16 May 2015	Gamba Osaka	1–1	Kawasaki Frontale	Expo '70 Commemorative Stadium	18,842
1–13	23 May 2015	Kawasaki Frontale	3–2	Sagan Tosu	Kawasaki Todoroki Stadium	14,881
1–14	30 May 2015	Shimizu S-Pulse	5–2	Kawasaki Frontale	IAI Stadium Nihondaira	13,055
1–15	7 June 2015	Kawasaki Frontale	2–1	Shonan Bellmare	Kawasaki Todoroki Stadium	20,857
1–16	20 June 2015	Kawasaki Frontale	2–0	Matsumoto Yamaga FC	Kawasaki Todoroki Stadium	21,490
1–17	27 June 2015	Kashima Antlers	2–3	Kawasaki Frontale	Kashima Soccer Stadium	13,867
2–1	11 July 2015	Kawasaki Frontale	2–0	FC Tokyo	Kawasaki Todoroki Stadium	23,793
2–2	15 July 2015	Sagan Tosu	1–1	Kawasaki Frontale	Best Amenity Stadium	7,524
2–3	19 July 2015	Kashiwa Reysol	1–0	Kawasaki Frontale	Hitachi Kashiwa Stadium	14,055
2–4	25 July 2015	Kawasaki Frontale	3–2	Shimizu S-Pulse	Kawasaki Todoroki Stadium	20,040
2–5	29 July 2015	Matsumoto Yamaga FC	1–3	Kawasaki Frontale	Matsumotodaira Park Stadium	15,610
2–6	12 August 2015	Kawasaki Frontale	0–0	Montedio Yamagata	Kawasaki Todoroki Stadium	19,154
2–7	16 August 2015	Vissel Kobe	2–0	Kawasaki Frontale	Noevir Stadium Kobe	15,451
2–8	22 August 2015	Shonan Bellmare	2–1	Kawasaki Frontale	Shonan BMW Stadium Hiratsuka	14,136
2–9	29 August 2015	Kawasaki Frontale	1–3	Kashima Antlers	Kawasaki Todoroki Stadium	22,632
2–10	12 September 2015	Ventforet Kofu	1–3	Kawasaki Frontale	Yamanashi Chuo Bank Stadium	11,069
2–11	19 September 2015	Kawasaki Frontale	6–1	Nagoya Grampus	Kawasaki Todoroki Stadium	20,238
2–12	26 September 2015	Albirex Niigata	1–2	Kawasaki Frontale	Denka Big Swan Stadium	22,573
2–13	4 October 2015	Kawasaki Frontale	5–3	Gamba Osaka	Kawasaki Todoroki Stadium	24,300
2–14	17 October 2015	Sanfrecce Hiroshima	2–1	Kawasaki Frontale	Edion Stadium Hiroshima	19,751
2–15	24 October 2015	Kawasaki Frontale	0–1	Yokohama F. Marinos	Kawasaki Todoroki Stadium	23,701
2–16	7 November 2015	Urawa Reds	1–1	Kawasaki Frontale	Saitama Stadium 2002	46,597
2–17	22 November 2015	Kawasaki Frontale	1–0	Vegalta Sendai	Kawasaki Todoroki Stadium	22,511
