= Reiya Morishita =

Japanese footballer

Reiya Morishita 森下 怜哉
Personal information
- Full name: Reiya Morishita
- Date of birth: November 1, 1998 (age 28)
- Place of birth: Kawachinagano, Osaka, Japan
- Height: 1.80 m (5 ft 11 in)
- Position: Centre back

Team information
- Current team: Sagan Tosu
- Number: 37

Youth career
- 2005–2010: Kusunoki JSC
- 2011–2013: Nagano FC
- 2014–2016: Cerezo Osaka

Senior career*
Years	Team	Apps	(Gls)
2016–2021	Cerezo Osaka	0	(0)
2016–2018	→ Cerezo Osaka U-23 (loan)	83	(5)
2019	→ Tochigi SC (loan)	27	(1)
2020	→ Matsumoto Yamaga (loan)	15	(1)
2021	→ FC Machida Zelvia (loan)	12	(0)
2022–2024	Ehime FC	87	(4)
2025–	Sagan Tosu	25	(2)
Medal record
Cerezo Osaka
Winner	J.League Cup	2017
Winner	Emperor's Cup	2017
- * Club domestic league appearances and goals as of 1 January 2026

Reiya Morishita (森下 怜哉, Morishita Reiya; born November 1, 1998) is a Japanese footballer who plays as a centre back for J2 League club Sagan Tosu.

== Career ==
Reiya Morishita joined Cerezo Osaka in 2016. On March 13, he debuted in J3 League (v Grulla Morioka).

== Club statistics ==
Updated to 23 February 2017.

Club performance			League		Cup		League Cup		Total	
Season	Club	League	Apps	Goals	Apps	Goals	Apps	Goals	Apps	Goals
Japan			League		Emperor's Cup		J. League Cup		Total	
2016	Cerezo Osaka U-23	J3 League	21	2	–		–		0	0
Total			21	2	–		–		0	0

== Honours ==
Ehime FC

- J3 League: 2023

Individual

- J3 League Best XI: 2023
