= Daichi Akiyama =

Japanese footballer

Daichi Akiyama 秋山 大地
Personal information
- Full name: Daichi Akiyama
- Date of birth: July 28, 1994 (age 32)
- Place of birth: Fujiidera, Osaka, Japan
- Height: 1.72 m (5 ft 7 1/2 in)
- Position: Midfielder

Team information
- Current team: Nankatsu SC
- Number: 26

Youth career
- 2007–2012: Cerezo Osaka

Senior career*
Years	Team	Apps	(Gls)
2013–2021	Cerezo Osaka	28	(0)
2015	→ Ehime FC (loan)	16	(0)
2015	→ J.League U-22 (loan)	2	(0)
2016–	→ Cerezo Osaka U-23 (loan)	28	(0)
2019	→ Montedio Yamagata (loan)	4	(0)
2021	→ Gainare Tottori (loan)	12	(1)
2022–	Nankatsu SC	7	(0)
Medal record
Cerezo Osaka
Winner	J.League Cup	2017
Winner	Emperor's Cup	2017
- * Club domestic league appearances and goals as of 04:40, 14 October 2022 (UTC)

Daichi Akiyama (秋山 大地, Akiyama Daichi; born July 28, 1994) is a Japanese football player for Nankatsu SC.

== Club statistics ==
As of 2 October 2022.

Club performance			League		Cup		League Cup		Continental		Total	
Season	Club	League	Apps	Goals	Apps	Goals	Apps	Goals	Apps	Goals	Apps	Goals
Japan			League		Emperor's Cup		J.League Cup		AFC		Total	
2013	Cerezo Osaka	J1 League	0	0	0	0	0	0	–		0	0
2014	Cerezo Osaka	J1 League	3	0	2	0	0	0	–		5	0
2015	Cerezo Osaka	J2 League	7	0	1	0	–		–		8	0
2015	Ehime FC	J2 League	16	0	–		–		–		16	0
2016	Cerezo Osaka	J2 League	2	0	0	0	–		–		2	0
2017	Cerezo Osaka	J1 League	12	0	5	0	10	1	–		27	1
2018	Cerezo Osaka	J1 League	3	0	1	0	0	0	1	0	5	0
2019	Cerezo Osaka	J1 League	0	0	0	0	0	0	–		0	0
2019	Montedio Yamagata	J2 League	4	0	–		–		–		4	0
2020	Cerezo Osaka	J1 League	0	0	0	0	0	0	–		0	0
2021	Gainare Tottori	J3 League	12	1	1	0	–		–		13	1
2022	Nankatsu SC	Kantō Soccer League Division 1	7	0	0	0	–		–		7	0
Career total			66	1	10	0	10	1	1	0	87	1

== Reserves performance ==
As of match played 20 December 2020

Club performance			League		Total	
Season	Club	League	Apps	Goals	Apps	Goals
Japan			League		Total	
2015	J.League U-22 Selection	J3 League	2	0	2	0
2016	Cerezo Osaka U-23	J3 League	13	0	13	0
2019	Cerezo Osaka U-23	J3 League	8	0	8	0
2020	Cerezo Osaka U-23	J3 League	7	0	7	0
Career total			30	0	30	0
