= Ryuji Sawakami =

Japanese footballer

Ryuji Sawakami 澤上 竜二
Personal information
- Full name: Ryuji Sawakami
- Date of birth: 8 October 1993 (age 33)
- Place of birth: Nara, Japan
- Height: 1.81 m (5 ft 11 in)
- Positions: Forward; winger

Team information
- Current team: Vanraure Hachinohe
- Number: 10

Youth career
- 2009–2011: Hiryū High School

College career
Years	Team	Apps	(Gls)
2012–2015	Osaka University H&SS		

Senior career*
Years	Team	Apps	(Gls)
2016–2023	Cerezo Osaka	44	(1)
2016–2020	→ Cerezo Osaka U-23 (loan)	43	(7)
2020	→ FC Imabari (loan)	23	(1)
2021	→ SC Sagamihara (loan)	8	(0)
2022	→ Gainare Tottori (loan)	46	(7)
2023	→ Fukushima United (loan)	17	(2)
2024	Fukushima United FC	22	(2)
2025–	Vanraure Hachinohe	59	(16)
Medal record
Cerezo Osaka
Winner	J.League Cup	2017
Winner	Emperor's Cup	2017
- * Club domestic league appearances and goals as of 13 August 2026

Ryuji Sawakami (澤上 竜二, Sawakami Ryuji; born 8 October 1993) is a Japanese footballer who plays as a forward for Vanraure Hachinohe.

== Career ==
Sawakami was born in Nara, Japan. On 24 July 2015, he joined Gamba Osaka from Osaka University of Health and Sport Sciences for the 2016 season.

On 7 October 2021, Sawakami was announced at SC Sagamihara on loan.

== Club statistics ==
Updated to 26 February 2019.

Club performance			League		Cup		League Cup		Total	
Season	Club	League	Apps	Goals	Apps	Goals	Apps	Goals	Apps	Goals
Japan			League		Emperor's Cup		J.League Cup		Total	
2016	Cerezo Osaka	J2 League	30	1	1	1	–		31	2
2017	Cerezo Osaka	J1 League	12	0	2	0	5	0	19	0
2018	Cerezo Osaka	J1 League	2	0	0	0	0	0	2	0
Career total			44	1	3	1	5	0	52	2

== Reserves performance ==
Last Updated: 26 February 2019

Club performance			League		Total	
Season	Club	League	Apps	Goals	Apps	Goals
Japan			League		Total	
2016	Gamba Osaka U-23	J3	3	1	3	1
2017	Gamba Osaka U-23	J3	2	0	2	0
2018	Gamba Osaka U-23	J3	3	1	3	1
Career total			8	2	8	2
