= Hiroshi Kiyotake =

Japanese footballer (born 1989)

Hiroshi Kiyotake 清武 弘嗣
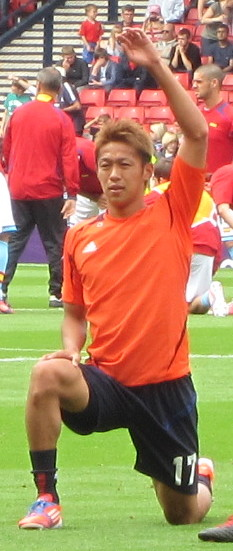
- Kiyotake playing for Japan U23

Personal information
- Full name: Hiroshi Kiyotake
- Date of birth: 12 November 1989 (age 36)
- Place of birth: Ōita, Japan
- Height: 1.72 m (5 ft 8 in)
- Positions: Attacking midfielder; winger

Team information
- Current team: Oita Trinita
- Number: 28

Youth career
- Meiji Kita SSC
- 2002–2003: FC Catiolla
- 2004–2007: Oita Trinita

Senior career*
Years	Team	Apps	(Gls)
2008–2009	Oita Trinita	31	(4)
2010–2012	Cerezo Osaka	66	(13)
2012–2014	1. FC Nürnberg	64	(7)
2014–2016	Hannover 96	53	(10)
2016–2017	Sevilla	4	(1)
2017–2024	Cerezo Osaka	162	(23)
2024	→ Sagan Tosu (loan)	10	(1)
2025–	Oita Trinita	11	(1)

International career^{‡}
2009	Japan U20	5	(1)
2011–2012	Japan U23	16	(2)
2011–2017	Japan	43	(5)
Medal record
Oita Trinita
Winner	J.League Cup	2008
Cerezo Osaka
Winner	J.League Cup	2017
Winner	Emperor's Cup	2017
- * Club domestic league appearances and goals as of 16 August 2026 ‡ National team caps and goals as of 28 March 2017

Hiroshi Kiyotake (清武 弘嗣, Kiyotake Hiroshi; born 12 November 1989) is a Japanese professional footballer who plays as an attacking midfielder or a winger for J2 League club Oita Trinita.

He played for Japan at the 2012 Summer Olympics.

== Club career ==
In the summer of 2012, Kiyotake signed a four-year contract with German club 1. FC Nürnberg. During his time with the club, he played 64 matches, scoring seven and assisting 18.

Kiyotake subsequently moved within the Bundesliga in 2014 to join Hannover 96 on a four year contract.

On 24 June 2016, Kiyotake transferred to La Liga side Sevilla on a four year contract, following Hannover 96's relegation from the Bundesliga.

On 1 February 2017, Kiyotake was announced at Cerezo Osaka. On 23 December 2019, he renewed his contract with the club for the 2020 season.

On 7 July 2024, Kiyotake joined Sagan Tosu on a six month loan.

On 19 December 2024, the club announced it would not be renewing Kiyotake's contract for the 2025 season.

On 21 December 2024, Kiyotake was announced at Oita Trinita.

== International career ==
Kiyotake made his Japan national team debut against South Korea on 10 August 2011. He scored his first international goal against Oman national football team on 14 November 2012, scoring in the 20th minute.

On 2 July 2012, Kiyotake was called up to the Japan squad for the 2012 Summer Olympics.

On 5 June 2013, Kiyotake was called up to the Japan squad for the 2013 FIFA Confederations Cup.

On 12 May 2014, Kiyotake was called up to the Japan squad for the 2014 FIFA World Cup.

On 15 December 2014, Kiyotake was called up to the Japan squad for the 2015 AFC Asian Cup.

== Personal life ==
His younger brother, Koki, is also a professional football player.

== Career statistics ==
=== Club ===
As of 17 May 2021

Appearances and goals by club, season and competition
Club	Season	League	League		National cup (Note: Includes Emperor's Cup and DFB-Pokal and Copa del Rey and Supercopa and J. League Super Cup.)		League cup (Note: Includes J. League Cup.)		Continental (Note: Includes AFC Champions League and Pan-Pacific Championship and UEFA Champions League and UEFA Super Cup.)		Total	
Club	Season	League	Apps	Goals	Apps	Goals	Apps	Goals	Apps	Goals	Apps	Goals
Oita Trinita	2008	J1 League	8	1	1	0	3	0	–		12	1
Oita Trinita	2009	J1 League	23	3	2	0	6	1	1	0	32	4
Oita Trinita	Total		31	4	3	0	9	1	1	0	44	5
Cerezo Osaka	2010	J1 League	25	4	3	0	1	0	–		29	4
Cerezo Osaka	2011	J1 League	25	7	3	1	0	0	9	4	37	12
Cerezo Osaka	2012	J1 League	16	2	0	0	3	1	–		19	3
Cerezo Osaka	2017	J1 League	18	6	4	0	4	0	–		26	6
Cerezo Osaka	2018	J1 League	20	4	1	1	2	0	1	0	24	5
Cerezo Osaka	2019	J1 League	27	1	0	0	1	0	–		28	1
Cerezo Osaka	2020	J1 League	33	8	–		4	1	–		37	9
Cerezo Osaka	2021	J1 League	15	1	–		0	0	–		15	1
Cerezo Osaka	Total		179	33	11	2	15	2	10	4	215	41
1. FC Nürnberg	2012–13	Bundesliga	31	4	1	0	–		–		32	4
1. FC Nürnberg	2013–14	Bundesliga	33	3	1	0	–		–		34	3
1. FC Nürnberg	Total		64	7	2	0	–		–		66	7
Hannover 96	2014–15	Bundesliga	32	5	1	0	–		–		33	5
Hannover 96	2015–16	Bundesliga	21	5	1	0	–		–		22	5
Hannover 96	Total		53	10	2	0	–		–		55	10
Sevilla	2016–17	La Liga	4	1	3	0	–		2	0	9	1
Career total			331	55	21	2	24	3	13	4	389	64

=== International ===
Appearances and goals by national team and year
National team	Year	Apps	Goals
Japan	2011	5	0
Japan	2012	7	1
Japan	2013	11	0
Japan	2014	3	0
Japan	2015	7	0
Japan	2016	9	4
Japan	2017	1	0
Total		43	5

As of match played 15 November 2016
Scores and results list Japan's goal tally first, score column indicates score after each Kiyotake goal.

List of international goals scored by Hiroshi Kiyotake
No.	Date	Venue	Cap	Opponent	Score	Result	Competition
1	14 November 2012	Sultan Qaboos Sports Complex, Muscat, Oman	12	Oman	1–0	2–1	2014 FIFA World Cup qualification
2	24 March 2016	Saitama Stadium 2002, Saitama, Japan	33	Afghanistan	2–0	5–0	2018 FIFA World Cup qualification
3	7 June 2016	Suita City Football Stadium, Suita, Osaka, Japan	35	Bosnia and Herzegovina	1–0	1–2	2016 Kirin Soccer Cup
4	11 November 2016	Kashima Soccer Stadium, Kashima, Ibaraki, Japan	41	Oman	3–0	4–0	2016 Kirin Challenge Cup
5	15 November 2016	Saitama Stadium 2002, Saitama, Japan	42	Saudi Arabia	1–0	2–1	2018 FIFA World Cup qualification

== Honours ==
Oita Trinita

- J.League Cup: 2008

Cerezo Osaka

- J.League Cup: 2017
- Emperor's Cup: 2017
- Japanese Super Cup: 2018
