= Hirofumi Yamauchi =

Japanese footballer

Personal information
- Date of birth: February 9, 1995 (age 31)
- Place of birth: Saitama, Japan
- Height: 1.82 m (5 ft 11 1/2 in)
- Position: Midfielder

Team information
- Current team: YSCC Yokohama
- Number: 22

Youth career
- Kaneko FC
- –2009: Reysol SS Ome
- 2010–2012: Kokugakuin Univ. Kugayama High School

College career
Years	Team	Apps	(Gls)
2013–2016	Waseda University		

Senior career*
Years	Team	Apps	(Gls)
2017–2020	Cerezo Osaka	0	(0)
2017–2020	→ Cerezo Osaka U-23	29	(4)
2018–2019	→ FC Machida Zelvia (loan)	25	(1)
2020	→ Montedio Yamagata (loan)	5	(0)
2021–2024	FC Gifu	57	(10)
2024	→ Veertien Mie (loan)	10	(1)
2025–	YSCC Yokohama	2	(0)
Medal record
Cerezo Osaka
Winner	J.League Cup	2017
Winner	Emperor's Cup	2017
- * Club domestic league appearances and goals as of 15 March 2025

Hirofumi Yamauchi (山内 寛史, Yamauchi Hirofumi; born February 9, 1995) is a Japanese football player who plays for YSCC Yokohama.

== Career ==
Hirofumi Yamauchi joined J1 League club Cerezo Osaka in 2017.

== Club statistics ==
Updated to 22 February 2018.

Club performance			League		Cup		League Cup		Total	
Season	Club	League	Apps	Goals	Apps	Goals	Apps	Goals	Apps	Goals
Japan			League		Emperor's Cup		J. League Cup		Total	
2017	Cerezo Osaka	J1 League	0	0	0	0	0	0	0	0
2017	Cerezo Osaka U-23	J3 League	6	2	–		–		6	2
Total			6	2	0	0	0	0	6	2
