= Ahn Joon-soo =

South Korean footballer (born 1998)

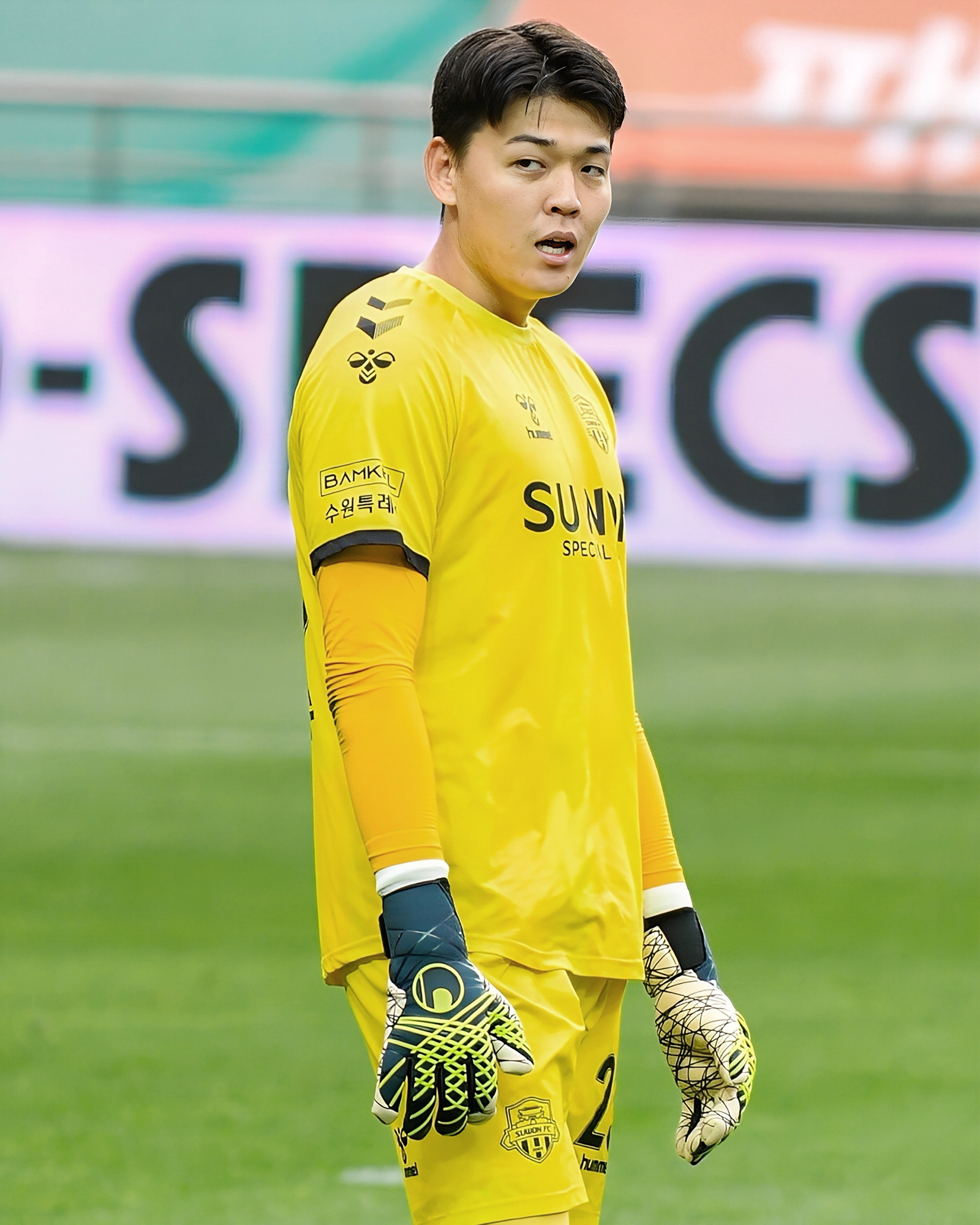
- Ahn in 2025

Personal information
- Date of birth: 28 January 1998 (age 28)
- Place of birth: Uijeongbu, South Korea
- Height: 1.90 m (6 ft 3 in)
- Position: Goalkeeper

Team information
- Current team: Suwon FC
- Number: 13

Youth career
- 2013–2016: FC Uijeongbu U-18

Senior career*
Years	Team	Apps	(Gls)
2016–2020	Cerezo Osaka	0	(0)
2016–2017	→ Cerezo Osaka U-23 (loan)	30	(0)
2018–2019	→ Kagoshima United FC (loan)	65	(0)
2021–2023	Busan IPark	32	(0)
2023	Jeonnam Dragons	18	(0)
2024–	Suwon FC	34	(0)

International career^{‡}
2013–2015	South Korea U17	20	(0)
2016–2017	South Korea U20	6	(0)
2019–2021	South Korea U23	5	(0)
Medal record
Men's football
Representing South Korea
AFC U-23 Championship
Gold medal – first place	2020 Thailand
- * Club domestic league appearances and goals as of 23 November 2024 ‡ National team caps and goals as of 13 July 2021

Ahn Joon-soo (Korean: 안준수; born 28 January 1998) is a South Korean football player. He plays as a goalkeeper for K League 1 club Suwon FC.

== Career ==
Ahn Joon-soo joined Cerezo Osaka in 2016. On 10 September, he debuted in J3 League (v Tochigi SC).

== Club statistics ==
As of 23 November 2024.

Appearances and goals by club, season and competition
Club	Season	League			Cup		League Cup		Total	
Club	Season	Division	Apps	Goals	Apps	Goals	Apps	Goals	Apps	Goals
Cerezo Osaka	2018	J1 League	—		0	0	—		0	0
Cerezo Osaka	2020	J1 League	0	0	—		1	0	1	0
Cerezo Osaka	Total		0	0	0	0	1	0	1	0
Cerezo Osaka U-23 (loan)	2016	J3 League	5	0	—		—		5	0
Cerezo Osaka U-23 (loan)	2017	J3 League	13	0	—		—		13	0
Cerezo Osaka U-23 (loan)	2020	J3 League	12	0	—		—		12	0
Cerezo Osaka U-23 (loan)	Total		30	0	—		—		30	0
Kagoshima United FC (loan)	2018	J3 League	29	0	—		—		29	0
Kagoshima United FC (loan)	2019	J3 League	36	0	0	0	—		36	0
Kagoshima United FC (loan)	Total		65	0	0	0	—		65	0
Busan IPark	2021	K League 2	15	0	1	0	—		16	0
Busan IPark	2022	K League 2	17	0	1	0	—		18	0
Busan IPark	2023	K League 2	0	0	0	0	—		0	0
Busan IPark	Total		32	0	2	0	—		34	0
Jeonnam Dragons	2023	K League 2	18	0	—		—		18	0
Suwon FC	2024	K League 1	34	0	0	0	—		34	0
Career total			179	0	2	0	1	0	182	0

== Honours ==
=== International ===
South Korea U23

- AFC U-23 Championship: 2020
