= Masataka Nishimoto =

Japanese footballer

Masataka Nishimoto 西本雅崇
Personal information
- Full name: Masataka Nishimoto
- Date of birth: 11 June 1996 (age 30)
- Place of birth: Yao, Osaka, Japan
- Height: 1.77 m (5 ft 10 in)
- Position: Midfielder

Team information
- Current team: FC Maruyasu Okazaki
- Number: 8

Youth career
- 2006–2014: Cerezo Osaka Youth

Senior career*
Years	Team	Apps	(Gls)
2015–2021	Cerezo Osaka	13	(0)
2016–2020	→ Cerezo Osaka U-23 (loan)	121	(15)
2021-2023	Kamatamare Sanuki	56	(2)
2023	Chiangrai City	8	(3)
2024–	FC Maruyasu Okazaki	12	(1)
Medal record
Cerezo Osaka
Winner	J.League Cup	2017
Winner	Emperor's Cup	2017
- * Club domestic league appearances and goals as of 22 August 2024 @ 17:08(AEST)

Masataka Nishimoto (西本雅崇, Nishimoto, Masataka; born 11 June 1996) is a Japanese footballer who plays as a midfielder for Thai League 3 club Chiangrai City.

== Club statistics ==
As of 1 October 2022.

Appearances and goals by club, season and competition
Club	Season	League			National cup		League cup		Other		Total	
Club	Season	Division	Apps	Goals	Apps	Goals	Apps	Goals	Apps	Goals	Apps	Goals
Japan			League		Emperor's Cup		J. League Cup		Other		Total	
Cerezo Osaka	2015	J2 League	0	0	0	0	–		–		0	0
Cerezo Osaka	2016	J2 League	0	0	0	0	–		–		0	0
Cerezo Osaka	2017	J1 League	1	0	0	0	4	0	–		5	0
Cerezo Osaka	2018	J1 League	2	0	0	0	0	0	2 (Note: Appearances in the AFC Champions League)	0	4	0
Cerezo Osaka	2019	J1 League	0	0	2	0	2	0	–		4	0
Cerezo Osaka	2020	J1 League	0	0	0	0	–		–		0	0
Cerezo Osaka	Total		3	0	2	0	6	0	2	0	13	0
Kamatamare Sanuki	2021	J3 League	27	0	1	0	-		-		28	0
Kamatamare Sanuki	2022	J3 League	20	1	0	0	-		-		20	1
Kamatamare Sanuki	Total		47	1	1	0	0	0	0	0	48	1
Career total			50	1	3	0	6	0	2	0	61	1

== Reserves performance ==
Last Updated: 26 December 2019.

Club	Season	League			Total	
Club	Season	Division	Apps	Goals	Apps	Goals
Japan			League		Total	
Cerezo Osaka U-23	2016	J3 League	25	6	25	6
Cerezo Osaka U-23	2017	J3 League	27	5	27	5
Cerezo Osaka U-23	2018	J3 League	16	2	16	2
Cerezo Osaka U-23	2019	J3 League	30	1	30	1
Cerezo Osaka U-23	2020	J3 League	23	1	23	1
Career total			121	15	121	14
