= Taiga Maekawa =

Japanese footballer

Taiga Maekawa 前川 大河
Personal information
- Full name: Taiga Maekawa
- Date of birth: June 13, 1996 (age 30)
- Place of birth: Settsu, Osaka, Japan
- Height: 1.71 m (5 ft 7 1/2 in)
- Position: Midfielder

Team information
- Current team: Kamatamare Sanuki
- Number: 13

Youth career
- 2012–2014: Cerezo Osaka

Senior career*
Years	Team	Apps	(Gls)
2015–2021	Cerezo Osaka	1	(0)
2015	→ J. League U-22 (loan)	2	(0)
2016–2018	→ Tokushima Vortis (loan)	85	(6)
2019	→ Avispa Fukuoka (loan)	40	(2)
2020	→ Montedio Yamagata (loan)	17	(3)
2021–2023	Giravanz Kitakyushu	96	(10)
2024–	Kamatamare Sanuki	60	(6)
- * Club domestic league appearances and goals as of 1 January 2026

Taiga Maekawa (前川 大河, Maekawa Taiga; born June 13, 1996 in Osaka) is a Japanese professional footballer who plays as a midfielder for J3 League club Kamatamare Sanuki.

== Playing career ==
Taiga Maekawa joined to J2 League club; Cerezo Osaka in 2015. In 2016, he moved to Tokushima Vortis.

== Club statistics ==
As of 22 October 2022.

Appearances and goals by club, season and competition
Club	Season	League			National cup		League cup		Total	
Club	Season	Division	Apps	Goals	Apps	Goals	Apps	Goals	Apps	Goals
Japan			League		Emperor's Cup		J. League Cup		Total	
Cerezo Osaka	2014	J1 League	0	0	0	0	0	0	0	0
Cerezo Osaka	2015	J2 League	1	0	1	0	—		2	0
Cerezo Osaka	2020	J1 League	0	0	2	0	—		2	0
Cerezo Osaka	Total		1	0	3	0	0	0	4	0
J.League U-22 Selection (loan)	2015	J3 League	2	0	0	0	–		2	0
Tokushima Vortis (loan)	2016	J2 League	9	0	1	0	–		10	0
Tokushima Vortis (loan)	2017	J2 League	37	2	0	0	–		37	2
Tokushima Vortis (loan)	2018	J2 League	39	4	2	0	–		41	4
Tokushima Vortis (loan)	Total		85	6	3	0	0	0	88	6
Avispa Fukuoka (loan)	2019	J2 League	40	2	2	1	–		42	3
Montedio Yamagata (loan)	2020	J2 League	17	3	0	0	–		17	3
Giravanz Kitakyushu	2021	J2 League	40	3	1	0	—		41	3
Giravanz Kitakyushu	2022	J3 League	26	3	1	0	—		27	3
Giravanz Kitakyushu	Total		66	6	2	0	0	0	68	6
Career total			211	17	10	1	0	0	221	18
