= Cerezo Osaka U-23 =

- Full name: Cerezo Osaka Under-23
- Nickname: Sakura Next
- Founded: 2016
- Dissolved: 2020
- Ground: Kincho Stadium
- Capacity: 19,904
- Owner: Yanmar
- Manager: Yuji Okuma
- League: J3 League
- 2020: 18th
- Website: www.cerezo.jp
Home colours	Away colours

Cerezo Osaka Under−23 was a Japanese football team based in Osaka. It was the reserve team of Cerezo Osaka and played in J3 League which they have done since their entry to the league at the beginning of the 2016 season. They played the majority of their home games at Kincho Stadium.

== History ==
Cerezo Osaka joined J3 League in 2016 along with the reserve teams of neighbours Gamba Osaka and FC Tokyo. None of these clubs are eligible for promotion to J2 League additionally they can only field 3 players over the age of 23.

== Record as J.League member ==
Season	Div.	Teams	Pos.	GP	W	D	L	F	A	GD	Pts	Attendance/G	Top scorer
2016	J3	16	12th	30	8	8	14	38	47	-9	32	1,488	Rei Yonezawa 8
2017	J3	17	13th	32	8	11	13	39	43	-4	35	909	Takeru Kishimoto 9
2018	J3	17	7th	32	13	7	12	47	36	11	46	1,112	Rei Yonezawa 12
2019	J3	18	6th	34	16	4	14	49	56	-7	52	1,196	Mizuki Ando 11
2020 †	J3	18	18th	34	5	10	19	28	61	-33	25	559	Shota Fujio 8

Key

- Pos. = Position in league; GP = Games played; W = Games won; D = Games drawn; L = Games lost; F = Goals scored; A = Goals conceded; GD = Goals difference; Pts = Points gained
- Attendance/G = Average league home attendance
- † 2020 season attendance reduced by COVID-19 worldwide pandemic.

== Current squad ==
As of 6 September 2020. Note: Flags indicate national team as defined under FIFA eligibility rules; some limited exceptions apply. Players may hold more than one non-FIFA nationality.

No.	Pos.	Nation	Player
4	DF	JPN	Yuta Koike
15	DF	JPN	Ayumu Seko
17	MF	JPN	Tatsuhiro Sakamoto
19	MF	JPN	Ryuji Sawakami
24	FW	AUS	Pierce Waring
27	GK	KOR	Ahn Joon-soo
28	FW	JPN	Motohiko Nakajima
29	MF	JPN	Takuya Shimamura
30	MF	JPN	Hinata Kida
31	MF	JPN	Hirofumi Yamauchi
33	FW	THA	Tawan Khotrsupho
35	MF	JPN	Yuji Yoshida
37	MF	JPN	Ryudai Maeda
38	MF	JPN	Masataka Nishimoto
39	DF	JPN	Honoya Shoji

No.	Pos.	Nation	Player
41	MF	JPN	Nagi Matsumoto
42	FW	JPN	Shota Fujio
43	DF	JPN	Ryuya Nishio
44	MF	JPN	Takaya Yoshinare
45	GK	JPN	Shu Mogi
46	DF	JPN	Tatsuya Tabira
48	FW	JPN	Kaili Shimbo
49	MF	JPN	Jun Nishikawa
50	GK	JPN	Go Kambayashi
51	GK	JPN	Ryoga Shimonaka
52	DF	JPN	Kota Ohashi
53	MF	JPN	Kosei Okazawa
54	FW	JPN	Kuraba Kondo
55	DF	JPN	Subaru Nishimura
59	MF	JPN	Sota Kitano
