= 2017 J.League Cup =

2017 JリーグYBCルヴァンカップ

Tournament details
- Country: Japan
- Dates: 15 March – 4 November 2017
- Teams: 18

Final positions
- Champions: Cerezo Osaka (1st title)
- Runners-up: Kawasaki Frontale

Tournament statistics
- Matches played: 59
- Goals scored: 157 (2.66 per match)
- Top goal scorer: Crislan (5 goals)

The 2017 J.League Cup (2017 Jリーグカップ), or officially the 2017 J.League YBC Levain Cup (2017 JリーグYBCルヴァンカップ), was the 42nd edition of the most prestigious Japanese football league cup tournament and the 25th edition under the current J.League Cup format.

== Format ==
Teams from the 2017 J1 League took part in the tournament. Teams that qualified for 2017 AFC Champions League group stage (3 or 4 teams: later confirmed as Gamba Osaka, Kashima Antlers, Kawasaki Frontale and Urawa Red Diamonds) were given byes to the quarter-finals. The remaining teams (14 or 15 teams) started from the group stage, where they were divided into two groups of 7 or 8 teams. The group winners of each group were to qualify for the quarter-finals. The remaining quarterfinalists (2 or 3 teams) were to be the winners of the play-off of the following two-legged ties:

- If 3 teams automatically qualified for the quarter-finals due to the participation in AFC Champions League:
  - Group A runners-up v. Group B fourth place
  - Group A third place v. Group B third place
  - Group A fourth place v. Group B runners-up
- If 4 teams automatically qualified for the quarter-finals due to the participation in AFC Champions League:
  - Group A runners-up v. Group B third place
  - Group A third place v. Group B runners-up

== Group stage ==
=== Group A ===
==== Standings ====
Team	Pld	W	D	L	GF	GA	GD	Pts
Vegalta Sendai	6	4	1	1	10	10	0	13
FC Tokyo	6	4	0	2	14	8	+6	12
Consadole Sapporo	6	3	1	2	7	5	+2	10
Júbilo Iwata	6	3	0	3	10	10	0	9
Omiya Ardija	6	2	2	2	11	8	+3	8
Kashiwa Reysol	6	1	2	3	4	6	−2	5
Shimizu S-Pulse	6	1	0	5	5	14	−9	3

==== Results ====
Home \ Away	ARD	REY	TOK	VEG	JÚB	CON	SSP
Omiya Ardija		0–0		1–2			4–0
Kashiwa Reysol			0–1		1–2		1–0
FC Tokyo	4–3			6–0		1–0	
Vegalta Sendai		1–1			2–0		3–1
Júbilo Iwata	1–2		3–1			0–2	
Consadole Sapporo	1–1	2–1		1–2			
Shimizu S-Pulse			2–1		2–4	0–1	

Legend: Blue = home team win; Yellow = draw; Red = away team win.

=== Group B ===
==== Standings ====
Team	Pld	W	D	L	GF	GA	GD	Pts
Vissel Kobe	6	5	0	1	10	3	+7	15
Cerezo Osaka	6	4	2	0	9	4	+5	14
Sanfrecce Hiroshima	6	3	1	2	5	6	−1	10
Yokohama F. Marinos	6	3	0	3	8	8	0	9
Ventforet Kofu	6	1	2	3	5	6	−1	5
Sagan Tosu	6	1	2	3	10	12	−2	5
Albirex Niigata	6	0	1	5	3	11	−8	1

==== Results ====
Home \ Away	SFR	VIS	YMA	SAG	VEN	ALB	CER
Sanfrecce Hiroshima				1–0	0–0		0–1
Vissel Kobe	4–1			1–0	2–1		
Yokohama F. Marinos	1–2	0–2				4–1	
Sagan Tosu			1–2			2–2	4–4
Ventforet Kofu			0–1	2–3			0–0
Albirex Niigata	0–1	0–1					0–2
Cerezo Osaka		1–0	2–0			1–0	

Legend: Blue = home team win; Yellow = draw; Red = away team win.

== Play-off stage ==
Team 1	Agg.	Team 2	1st leg	2nd leg
Consadole Sapporo	0–3	Cerezo Osaka	0–2	0–1
Sanfrecce Hiroshima	0–2	FC Tokyo	0–1	0–1

== Quarter-finals ==
Team 1	Agg.	Team 2	1st leg	2nd leg
Cerezo Osaka	2–2 (a)	Urawa Red Diamonds	0–0	2–2
Kawasaki Frontale	7–1	FC Tokyo	2–0	5–1
Vegalta Sendai	5–4	Kashima Antlers	3–1	2–3
Vissel Kobe	0–2	Gamba Osaka	0–0	0–2

== Semi-finals ==
=== First leg ===
4 October 2017	Cerezo Osaka	2–2	Gamba Osaka	Yanmar Stadium Nagai, Osaka
19:03	Ricardo Santos 23'; Kimoto 81'		16' Akasaki; 86' Ide	Attendance: 21,800; Referee: M. Tōjō

4 October 2017	Vegalta Sendai	3–2	Kawasaki Frontale	Yurtec Stadium Sendai, Sendai
19:04	Ishihara 24'; Crislan 33', 45+1' (pen.)		72' Nara; 90+4' Chinen	Attendance: 8,382; Referee: T. Okabe

=== Second leg ===
8 October 2017	Gamba Osaka	1–2	Cerezo Osaka	Suita City Football Stadium, Suita
14:03	Izumisawa 60'		15' Kakitani; 90+5' Kimoto	Attendance: 31,578; Referee: N. Murakami

8 October 2017	Kawasaki Frontale	3–1	Vegalta Sendai	Todoroki Athletics Stadium, Kawasaki
15:04	Miyoshi 29', 49'; Hasegawa 90'		59' Nakano	Attendance: 22,385; Referee: M. Toma

== Final ==
4 November 2017	Cerezo Osaka	2–0	Kawasaki Frontale	Saitama
13:05 UCT+9	Sugimoto 1'; Souza 90+2'			Stadium: Saitama Stadium 2002; Attendance: 53,452; Referee: Y. Nishimura

== Top scorers ==
As of match played 4 November 2017.

Rank	Player	Club	Goals
1	(Brazil) Crislan	Vegalta Sendai	5
2	(Japan) Koki Ogawa	Júbilo Iwata	4
2	(Japan) Junya Tanaka	Vissel Kobe	4
2	(Brazil) Ricardo Santos	Cerezo Osaka	4
