= 2017 Gamba Osaka season =

Gamba Osaka
2017 season
- Chairman: Teruhisa Noro
- Manager: Kenta Hasegawa
- J1 League: 10th
- Emperor's Cup: 4th round
- J.League Cup: Semi-final
- AFC Champions League: Group Stage
- Top goalscorer: League: Shun Nagasawa 10; All: Shun Nagasawa 16
- Highest home attendance: 36,177 vs Cerezo Osaka (J1) 29 July 2017
- Lowest home attendance: 3,597 vs Verspah Oita (Emperor's Cup) on 21 June 2017
- Average home league attendance: 24,277
Home colours	Away colours

The 2017 Gamba Osaka season was Gamba Osaka's 24th season in the J1 League and 30th overall in the Japanese top flight. It saw them compete in the 18 team J1 League which had reverted to a single stage format of 34 games where each team played the other 17 participants home and away after an unsuccessful trial of a first stage and second stage being followed by a championship playoff series. City rivals, Cerezo Osaka were promoted from J2 at the end of 2016 meaning that the two sides played derby matches for the first time since 2014 and with neighbouring Vissel Kobe also participating in J1, Gamba had 4 league derbies to look forward to throughout the season.

Gamba also competed in the 2017 J.League Cup and Emperors Cup with the timing of their entry into both competitions being determined by their progress in the Champions League. As the 4th placed side in the 2016 J1 League, Gamba entered at the play off round where they faced Malaysia's Johor Darul Ta'zim in a one-off match at Suita City Football Stadium on 7 February. Goals from Ademilson, Shun Nagasawa and Genta Miura secured a comfortable 3-0 victory and saw Gamba progress to the group stages where they were drawn in Group H along with Australian's Adelaide United, Korean side Jeju United and Chinese outfit Jiangsu Suning. Unfortunately for the second season running they were eliminated at the group stage after taking a mere 4 points from their 6-round robin games.

Gamba's results in other competitions were equally disappointing. A bright start in J1 saw them top the standing after round 12, however just 4 wins in their remaining matches led them to a 10th-place finish which saw long serving manager Kenta Hasegawa removed from his position at the end of the season.

Gamba ended the season trophy-less following a defeat to city rivals Cerezo in the semi-finals of the J.League Cup and a 3-2 home loss against Kashiwa Reysol in the 4th round of the Emperor's Cup.

== Transfers ==
Prior to the commencement on the 2017 season, Gamba announced a raft of transfer dealings. Headlining the arrivals were, attacking midfielder, Jin Izumisawa, who had played a key role in Omiya Ardija's 5th-place finish in J1 the previous year where he linked well with ex-Gamba favourite Akihiro Ienaga as well as Brazilian centre-back Fabio who took the well trodden path to Osaka from Yokohama F. Marinos to provide competition for the established centre-half pairing of Daiki Niwa and Kim Jung-ya. In addition Ryota Suzuki, who had been on loan at J2 League side, Tokyo Verdy, from his parent club Yokohama F. Marinos in 2016 came in to compete with Yosuke Fujigawa and Ken Tajiri to be backup to first choice goalkeeper, Masaaki Higashiguchi. Young defender Genta Miura from newly promoted J1 side Shimizu S-Pulse and midfielder Haruya Ide from JEF United Chiba rounded off the signings who would immediately join up with the first team squad.

Young talent in the form of midfielders; Shogo Nakahara from Consadole Sapporo and Yuto Mori from Nagoya Grampus as well as striker Hiromu Kori from J3 outfit Grulla Morioka all arrived but would initially link up with Gamba Osaka U-23 ahead of their second season of J3 football while midfielders Reo Takae, Takahiro Koh and South Korean defender Bae Soo-yong all joined the club straight from high school and would join Nakahara, Mori and Kori in the under-23 side. Ryotaro Meshino, who played 13 times for Gamba Under-23 in 2016 was officially promoted to the senior squad for 2017 although he would begin the year once more with the under-23s.

There were several big name departures as Gamba head-coach Kenta Hasegawa went about reducing the average age of the squad ahead of the 2017 season. Probably the biggest surprise was right-sided midfielder Hiroyuki Abe's move to J1 rivals Kawasaki Frontale, having been a key member of the side since his arrival in 2012, scoring 7 times in 30 games during Gamba's J1 title winning season of 2014. Fellow attacking midfielder and Gamba youth product, Kotaro Omori, made the short trip west to join Vissel Kobe while experienced centre-half Keisuke Iwashita, who had been plagued with injuries and subsequently lost his place to Kim Jung-ya during the previous campaign joined Avispa Fukuoka who had been relegated from J1 at the end of 2016.

Striker Shingo Akamine, who had spent the 2016 season on loan to J2 side Fagiano Okayama, made his move there permanent. Veteran midfielder Takahiro Futagawa, who had been on loan at Tokyo Verdy for the second half of 2016, extended his loan for another 12 months. Joining him in Tokyo would be Tatsuya Uchida, who also joined Verdy on a year's loan, while another Gamba youth product, Takaharu Nishino, joined JEF United on loan for the season, attempting to rebuild his career which had been hampered by injuries.

Rounding off the pre-season departures, it was no surprise to see midfielders Kenya Okazaki and Shohei Ogura head through the exit door, both were experienced pros who'd spent the bulk of the previous year playing J3 football with Gamba's Under-23 side and were moved on to make way for younger talent. Okazaki made the move to J2 outfit Tochigi SC while Ogura signed for J1's Ventforet Kofu. Finally, young attacking midfielder, Naoki Ogawa, a squad member since 2014 without managing a single league appearance wasn't named in the 2017 squad and his future in the game is still to be announced.

Kashima Antlers forward Shuhei Akasaki joined the squad on a season-long loan 3 weeks into the new campaign and was assigned the number 53 shirt. He debuted as a second-half substitute in the match against the Urawa Red Diamonds on March 19. On the final day of the winter transfer window, Brazilian striker Patric who had been undergoing rehabilitation on his injured knee in his homeland was re-registered ahead of an anticipated return to fitness in June, however, after an appearance for Gamba U-23 in late May, the club announced that his contracted would not be renewed when it expired on June 30.

=== In ===
No.	Pos	Player	Transferred From	Fee	Date	Source
34	MF	(Japan) Takahiro Ko	(Japan) Funabashi High School	Unknown	1 Sept 2016	
42	DF	(South Korea) Bae Soo-yong	(South Korea) Boin High School	Loan	1 Sept 2016	
44	MF	(Japan) Leo Takae	(Japan) Higashi Fukuoka High School	Unknown	15 Sept 2016	
40	MF	(Japan) Ryotaro Meshino	(Japan) Gamba Osaka Youth	Promotion	21 Sept 2016	
24	MF	(Japan) Haruya Ide	(Japan) JEF United	Unknown	27 Dec 2016	
29	FW	(Japan) Hiromu Kori	(Japan) Grulla Morioka	Loan	27 Dec 2016	
39	MF	(Japan) Jin Izumisawa	(Japan) Omiya Ardija	Unknown	5 Jan 2017	
3	DF	(Brazil) Fábio	(Japan) Yokohama F. Marinos	Unknown	6 Jan 2017	
2	DF	(Japan) Genta Miura	(Japan) Shimizu S-Pulse	Unknown	6 Jan 2017	
27	MF	(Japan) Yuto Mori	(Japan) Nagoya Grampus	Unknown	6 Jan 2017	
23	MF	(Japan) Shogo Nakahara	(Japan) Consadole Sapporo	Loan	6 Jan 2017	
19	GK	(Japan) Ryota Suzuki	(Japan) Tokyo Verdy	Unknown	6 Jan 2017	
53	FW	(Japan) Shuhei Akasaki	(Japan) Kashima Antlers	Loan	11 Mar 2017	
55	FW	(Brazil) Patric	N/A	Re-registered	31 Mar 2017	
11	FW	(South Korea) Hwang Ui-jo	(South Korea) Seongnam FC	Unknown	20 Jun 2017	
55	DF	(Japan) Takaharu Nishino	(Japan) JEF United	Loan Return	29 Jun 2017	

=== Out ===
No.	Pos	Player	Transferred To	Fee	Date	Source
3	DF	(Japan) Takaharu Nishino	(Japan) JEF United	Loan	27 Dec 2016	
8	DF	(Japan) Keisuke Iwashita	(Japan) Avispa Fukuoka	Unknown	27 Dec 2016	
10	MF	(Japan) Takahiro Futagawa	(Japan) Tokyo Verdy	Loan Extension	27 Dec 2016	
19	MF	(Japan) Kotaro Omori	(Japan) Vissel Kobe	Unknown	27 Dec 2016	
27	MF	(Japan) Tatsuya Uchida	(Japan) Tokyo Verdy	Loan	27 Dec 2016	
	FW	(Japan) Shingo Akamine	(Japan) Fagiano Okayama	Unknown	27 Dec 2016	
13	MF	(Japan) Hiroyuki Abe	(Japan) Kawasaki Frontale	Unknown	4 Jan 2017	
17	MF	(Japan) Kenya Okazaki	(Japan) Tochigi SC	Unknown	6 Jan 2017	
40	MF	(Japan) Shōhei Ogura	(Japan) Ventforet Kofu	Free	12 Jan 2017	
24	FW	(Japan) Naoki Ogawa	released	N/A	15 Jan 2017	
16	GK	(Japan) Ken Tajiri	(Japan) Zweigen Kanazawa	loan	4 Jun 2017	
38	MF	(Japan) Ritsu Doan	(Netherlands) FC Groningen	loan	23 Jun 2017	
5	DF	(Japan) Daiki Niwa	(Japan) Sanfrecce Hiroshima	Unknown	27 Jun 2017	
55	FW	(Brazil) Patric	(Japan) Sanfrecce Hiroshima	Unknown	27 Jun 2017	

== Coaching staff ==
Position	Staff
First-team manager	(Japan) Kenta Hasegawa
Head coach	(Japan) Ichiro Wada
Physical Coach	(Japan) Koichiro Yoshimichi
Technical coach	(Japan) Taku Oshima
Goalkeeper coach	(Japan) Shinichi Morishita
Assistant coach	(Japan) Arata Kodama

== First-team squad ==
Appearances and goals as of the beginning of the 2017 season.

No.	Name	Nationality	Position(s)	Date of birth (age)	Height (cm)	Weight (kg)	Since	Previous club	Games played	Goals scored
Goalkeepers
1	Masaaki Higashiguchi	(Japan)	GK	12 May 1986 (aged 31)	184	78	2014	Albirex Niigata	146	0
18	Yōsuke Fujigaya	(Japan)	GK	February 13, 1981 (aged 36)	185	78	2015	Júbilo Iwata	350	0
19	Ryota Suzuki	(Japan)	GK	February 10, 1994 (aged 23)	191	85	2017	Tokyo Verdy	0	0
31	Mizuki Hayashi	(Japan)	GK	September 4, 1996 (aged 21)	182	74	2015	Gamba Osaka Youth	0	0
Defenders
2	Genta Miura	(Japan)	CB / RB	March 1, 1995 (aged 22)	183	77	2017	Shimizu S-Pulse	0	0
3	Fábio	(Brazil)	CB	February 28, 1989 (aged 28)	186	78	2017	Yokohama F. Marinos	0	0
4	Hiroki Fujiharu	(Japan)	LB	November 28, 1988 (aged 29)	175	60	2011	Osaka University of H&SS	234	10
6	Kim Jung-ya	(Japan) / (South Korea)	CB	May 17, 1988 (aged 29)	183	74	2014	Sagan Tosu*	97	3
14	Koki Yonekura	(Japan)	RB	May 17, 1988 (aged 29)	176	68	2014	JEF United	114	8
22	Oh Jae-suk	(South Korea)	RB / LB	January 4, 1990 (aged 27)	178	74	2013	(South Korea) Gangwon FC	89	0
30	So Hirao	(Japan)	RB / CF	July 1, 1996 (aged 21)	170	68	2015	Gamba Osaka Youth	2	0
32	Hiroki Noda	(Japan)	CB	July 27, 1997 (aged 20)	181	73	2016	Otsu High School	0	0
35	Ryo Hatsuse	(Japan)	RB / LB	July 10, 1997 (aged 20)	175	64	2015	Gamba Osaka Youth	8	0
42	Bae Soo-yong	(Korea)	CB	June 7, 1998 (aged 19)	188	78	2017	Boin High School	0	0
55	Takaharu Nishino	(Japan)	CB	September 14, 1993 (aged 24)	187	73	2017	JEF United*	69	6
Midfielders
7	Yasuhito Endō (captain)	(Japan)	CM / AM	January 28, 1980 (aged 37)	178	75	2001	Kyoto Purple Sanga	659	122
8	Yosuke Ideguchi	(Japan)	CM	August 23, 1996 (aged 21)	171	69	2014	Gamba Osaka Youth	56	4
10	Shu Kurata	(Japan)	RW / LW / CM	November 26, 1988 (aged 29)	172	68	2012	Cerezo Osaka*	251	38
15	Yasuyuki Konno	(Japan)	CB / DM	January 25, 1983 (aged 34)	178	73	2012	FC Tokyo	218	20
23	Shogo Nakahara	(Japan)	CB / CM / LW	May 19, 1994 (aged 23)	177	68	2017	Consadole Sapporo	0	0
24	Haruya Ide	(Japan)	RB / AM / RW	March 25, 1994 (aged 23)	171	66	2017	JEF United	0	0
25	Jungo Fujimoto	(Japan)	RW / LW / AM	March 24, 1984 (aged 33)	173	69	2016	Yokohama F. Marinos	24	0
26	Naoya Senoo	(Japan)	LB / LM	August 15, 1996 (aged 21)	172	60	2015	Gamba Osaka Youth	1	0
27	Yuto Mori	(Japan)	CM / AM	April 21, 1995 (aged 22)	173	68	2017	Nagoya Grampus	0	0
28	Shota Yomesaka	(Japan)	CB / LB / RM	October 19, 1996 (aged 21)	177	67	2014	Gamba Osaka Youth	0	0
34	Takahiro Ko	(Japan)	CM	April 20, 1998 (aged 19)	172	67	2017	Funabashi High School	0	0
36	Mizuki Ichimaru	(Japan)	CM / RM	May 8, 1997 (aged 20)	174	66	2016	Gamba Osaka Youth	0	0
39	Jin Izumisawa	(Japan)	RW / LW / AM	December 17, 1991 (aged 25)	165	63	2017	Omiya Ardija	0	0
40	Ryotaro Meshino	(Japan)	MF	June 18, 1998 (aged 19)	171	68	2017	Gamba Osaka Youth	0	0
44	Reo Takae	(Japan)	LW	June 27, 1998 (aged 19)	171	60	2017	Higashi Fukuoka High School	0	0
Strikers
9	Ademilson	(Brazil)	AM / CF	January 9, 1994 (aged 23)	176	74	2016	(Brazil) São Paulo	40	13
11	Hwang Ui-jo	(Korea)	CF	28 August 1992 (aged 25)	184	73	2017	(Korea) Seongnam FC	0	0
13	Hiroto Goya	(Japan)	CF	January 2, 1994 (aged 23)	177	68	2016	Kwansei Gakuin University	20	2
20	Shun Nagasawa	(Japan)	CF	August 25, 1988 (aged 29)	192	82	2015	Shimizu S-Pulse	43	17
29	Hiromu Kori	(Japan)	CF	September 11, 1997 (aged 20)	184	77	2017	Grulla Morioka	0	0
33	Kazunari Ichimi	(Japan)	CF	November 10, 1997 (aged 20)	183	74	2016	Otsu High School	0	0
37	Akito Takagi	(Japan)	CF	August 4, 1997 (aged 20)	175	68	2016	Gamba Osaka Youth	1	0
53	Shuhei Akasaki	(Japan)	CF	September 1, 1991 (aged 26)	174	70	2017	Kashima Antlers (loan)	0	0

* indicates player returned to Gamba Osaka from a loan spell with this club.

== J1 League ==
The league returned to a single stage format for 2017 with 34 rounds played between March and November 2017. On 12 January, Gamba's first 2 fixtures for the season were announced, at home to Ventforet Kofu and away to Kashiwa Reysol. The dates for the remaining games were made public on January 25.

Round	Date	Time*	Opponents	H / A	Result F–A	Scorers	Attendance	League position
1	26 February 2017	17:00	Ventforet Kofu	H	1-1	Konno 90'+1	21,284	7th=
2	5 March 2017	15:00	Kashiwa Reysol	A	3-1	Nagasawa 7', 61', Ademilson (pen.) 72'	13,649	5th
3	11 March 2017	19:00	FC Tokyo	H	3-0	Ademilson 22', Kurata 52', Hashimoto (o.g.) 85'	24,292	2nd
4	19 March 2017	17:00	Urawa Red Diamonds	H	1-1	Konno 57'	34,733	5th
5	1 April 2017	14:00	Albirex Niigata	A	3-2	Kurata 9', Kim 76', Ideguchi 85'	20,043	3rd
6	7 April 2017	19:00	Sanfrecce Hiroshima	H	0-1		13,521	4th
7	16 April 2017	14:00	Cerezo Osaka	A	2-2	Fujiharu 57', Kurata 90'+3	42,438	5th
8	21 April 2017	19:00	Omiya Ardija	H	6-0	Ideguchi 16', Izumisawa 41', Kurata 54', Doan 62', 77', Miura 55'	13,074	2nd
9	30 April 2017	17:00	Yokohama F. Marinos	A	1-0	Doan 64'	31,808	2nd
10	5 May 2017	14:00	Shimizu S-Pulse	H	1-1	Kurata 57'	31,948	3rd
11	14 May 2017	19:00	Consadole Sapporo	A	2-0	Fujimoto 45', Izumisawa 89'	21,174	2nd
12	20 May 2017	19:00	Sagan Tosu	H	3-0	Nagasawa 33', 90'+3, Kurata 37'	21,366	1st
13	4 June 2017	15:00	Júbilo Iwata	A	0-3		13,953	3rd
14	17 June 2017	19:00	Vissel Kobe	A	1-0	Nagasawa 70'	24,522	3rd
15	25 June 2017	19:00	Kawasaki Frontale	H	1-1	Nagasawa 68'	24,835	4th
16	1 July 2017	19:00	Vegalta Sendai	A	3-2	Masushima o.g. 9', Ideguchi 70', Fábio 90'+1	14,052	4th
17	5 July 2017	19:00	Kashima Antlers	H	0-1		18,626	4th
18	8 July 2017	18:00	Shimizu S-Pulse	A	0-2		15,766	6th
19	29 July 2017	19:00	Cerezo Osaka	H	3-1	Hwang 65, Miura 77', Ademilson 86'	36,177	3rd
20	5 August 2017	18:00	Ventforet Kofu	A	0-1		11,275	6th
21	9 August 2017	19:00	Sanfrecce Hiroshima	A	2-2	Endō 47', Ademilson (pen.) 59'	12,573	6th
22	13 August 2017	18:30	Júbilo Iwata	H	0-2		35,315	7th
23	19 August 2017	19:00	Kashiwa Reysol	H	0-1		21,582	8th
24	26 August 2017	19:00	Sagan Tosu	A	3-1	Kurata 48', Nagasawa 74', Fujiharu 90'	16,474	7th
25	9 September 2017	19:00	Vissel Kobe	H	1-2	Kurata (pen.) 65'	31,775	7th
26	16 September 2017	18:00	Omiya Ardija	A	2-2	Ideguchi 28', Nagasawa 90'+4	13,364	7th
27	23 September 2017	19:00	Kashima Antlers	A	1-2	Hwang 7'	28,565	8th
28	30 September 2017	19:00	Yokohama F. Marinos	H	1-2	Nagasawa 78'	23,071	9th
29	14 October 2017	14:00	Albirex Niigata	H	0-1		19,523	10th
30	22 October 2017	17:00	Urawa Red Diamonds	A	3-3	Hwang 54', Akasaki 67', Goya 90'+2	21,603	9th
31	29 October 2017	16:00	Vegalta Sendai	H	1-1	Nagasawa 19'	15,962	10th
32	18 November 2017	14:00	Kawasaki Frontale	A	0-1		21,529	10th
33	26 November 2017	13:00	Consadole Sapporo	H	0-1		25,626	10th
34	2 December 2017	14:00	FC Tokyo	A	0-0		30,548	10th

* = all times Japan Standard Time.

=== Match Day Line-Ups ===
The following players appeared for Gamba Osaka during the 2017 J1 League:

Player Appearances – 2017 J1 League
Round	Opponent	GK	RB	LB	CB	CB	CM	CM	RW	LW	AM	CF	Substituted on	Substituted on	Substituted on
1	Ventforet Kofu	Higashiguchi	Oh (substituted off)	Fujiharu	Miura	Fábio	Ideguchi (substituted off)	Konno	Ademilson	Kurata (substituted off)	Endō	Nagasawa	Hatsuse	Doan	Izumisawa
		GK	RB	LB	CB	CB	CB	CM	CM	CM	CF	CF	Substituted on	Substituted on	Substituted on
2	Kashiwa Reysol	Higashiguchi	Hatsuse (substituted off)	Fujiharu	Miura	Fábio	Kim	Konno	Endō	Kurata	Ademilson (substituted off)	Nagasawa (substituted off)	Oh	Takagi	Doan
3	FC Tokyo	Higashiguchi	Hatsuse (substituted off)	Fujiharu	Miura	Fábio	Kim	Konno	Endō	Kurata (substituted off)	Ademilson (substituted off)	Nagasawa	Oh	Fujimoto	Takagi
4	Urawa Red Diamonds	Fujigaya (substituted off)	Hatsuse	Oh (substituted off)	Miura	Fábio	Kim	Konno	Endō	Kurata	Ademilson (substituted off)	Nagasawa	Ideguchi	Tajiri	Akasaki
5	Albirex Niigata	Higashiguchi	Hatsuse (substituted off)	Fujiharu	Miura	Fábio	Kim	Ideguchi	Endō (substituted off)	Kurata	Ademilson (substituted off)	Nagasawa	Niwa	Doan	Izumisawa
6	Sanfrecce Hiroshima	Higashiguchi	Oh (substituted off)	Fujiharu	Miura	Fábio	Niwa	Ideguchi	Endō (substituted off)	Kurata	Ademilson (substituted off)	Nagasawa	Doan	Izumisawa	Akasaki
7	Cerezo Osaka	Higashiguchi	Hatsuse (substituted off)	Fujiharu	Miura	Fábio (substituted off)	Kim	Ideguchi	Endō (substituted off)	Kurata	Akasaki	Nagasawa	Niwa	Doan	Izumisawa
		GK	RB	LB	CB	CB	CM	CM	RW	LW	AM / CF	CF	Substituted on	Substituted on	Substituted on
8	Omiya Ardija	Higashiguchi	Oh	Fujiharu (substituted off)	Miura	Kim	Ideguchi (substituted off)	Kurata	Fujimoto (substituted off)	Izumisawa	Doan	Akasaki	Endō	Yonekura	Nagasawa
9	Yokohama F. Marinos	Higashiguchi	Oh	Fujiharu	Miura	Fábio	Ideguchi	Kurata	Fujimoto (substituted off)	Izumisawa (substituted off)	Doan	Akasaki (substituted off)	Niwa	Ademilson	Nagasawa
10	Shimizu S-Pulse	Higashiguchi	Oh	Fujiharu (substituted off)	Miura	Fábio	Ideguchi	Kurata	Fujimoto (substituted off)	Ademilson (substituted off)	Doan	Nagasawa	Endō	Yonekura	Izumisawa
11	Consadole Sapporo	Higashiguchi	Oh	Fujiharu	Miura	Fábio	Ideguchi	Endō (substituted off)	Fujimoto (substituted off)	Kurata	Nagasawa	Akasaki (substituted off)	Niwa	Ademilson	Izumisawa
12	Sagan Tosu	Higashiguchi	Oh	Fujiharu	Miura	Fábio	Ideguchi	Endō	Fujimoto (substituted off)	Kurata	Nagasawa (substituted off)	Akasaki (substituted off)	Ademilson	Goya	Izumisawa
13	Júbilo Iwata	Higashiguchi	Oh (substituted off)	Fujiharu	Miura	Fábio	Ideguchi	Endō	Fujimoto (substituted off)	Kurata	Nagasawa	Akasaki (substituted off)	Ademilson	Konno	Hatsuse
14	Vissel Kobe	Higashiguchi	Oh	Fujiharu	Miura	Fábio	Konno	Endō	Kurata (substituted off)	Hatsuse (substituted off)	Doan	Patric (substituted off)	Nagasawa	Fujimoto	Izumisawa
15	Kawasaki Frontale	Higashiguchi	Oh	Fujiharu	Miura	Fábio	Ideguchi	Konno	Doan (substituted off)	Kurata	Endō (substituted off)	Nagasawa (substituted off)	Ademilson	Fujimoto	Akasaki
16	Vegalta Sendai	Higashiguchi	Oh	Fujiharu	Miura	Fábio	Ideguchi	Konno (substituted off)	Ademilson	Kurata	Endō (substituted off)	Nagasawa (substituted off)	Kim	Goya	Fujimoto
17	Kashima Antlers	Higashiguchi	Oh	Fujiharu	Miura	Fábio	Ideguchi	Konno (substituted off)	Fujimoto (substituted off)	Kurata	Ademilson (substituted off)	Nagasawa	Endō	Goya	Izumisawa
18	Shimizu S-Pulse	Higashiguchi	Oh	Hatsuse (substituted off)	Miura	Fábio	Ideguchi	Endō (substituted off)	Fujimoto	Izumisawa (substituted off)	Kurata	Goya	Fujiharu	Ademilson	Nagasawa
19	Cerezo Osaka	Higashiguchi	Oh (substituted off)	Fujiharu	Miura	Fábio	Ideguchi	Konno	Fujimoto (substituted off)	Kurata	Hwang (substituted off)	Nagasawa	Kim	Ademilson	Yonekura
20	Ventforet Kofu	Higashiguchi	Oh (substituted off)	Fujiharu	Miura	Fábio	Ideguchi	Konno	Fujimoto (substituted off)	Kurata	Hwang (substituted off)	Nagasawa	Ademilson	Yonekura	Hatsuse
21	Sanfrecce Hiroshima	Higashiguchi	Oh	Fujiharu	Miura	Kim	Ideguchi	Konno	Kurata (substituted off)	Endō	Ademilson (substituted off)	Nagasawa (substituted off)	Hwang	Yonekura	Izumisawa
22	Júbilo Iwata	Higashiguchi	Hatsuse	Fujiharu	Miura	Kim	Endō (substituted off)	Konno (substituted off)	Kurata	Ichimaru (substituted off)	Ademilson	Hwang	Nagasawa	Takagi	Izumisawa
		GK	RB	LB	CB	CB	CB	CM	CM	CM	CF	CF	Substituted on	Substituted on	Substituted on
23	Kashiwa Reysol	Higashiguchi	Oh (substituted off)	Fujiharu	Miura	Kim (substituted off)	Konno	Ideguchi	Endō	Kurata	Ademilson	Hwang (substituted off)	Nagasawa	Hatsuse	Izumisawa
		GK	RB	LB	CB	CB	CM	CM	RW	LW	AM / CF	CF	Substituted on	Substituted on	Substituted on
24	Sagan Tosu	Higashiguchi	Oh	Fujiharu	Miura	Fábio	Konno	Ideguchi	Endō (substituted off)	Kurata (substituted off)	Ademilson (substituted off)	Nagasawa	Kim	Hwang	Yonekura
25	Vissel Kobe	Higashiguchi	Oh	Fujiharu	Miura	Fábio	Konno (substituted off)	Ideguchi	Endō (substituted off)	Kurata	Ademilson (substituted off)	Nagasawa	Hwang	Yonekura	Izumisawa
26	Omiya Ardija	Higashiguchi	Oh	Fujiharu	Miura	Fábio (substituted off)	Konno (substituted off)	Ideguchi	Kurata	Izumisawa (substituted off)	Hwang	Nagasawa	Kim	Endō	Yonekura
27	Kashima Antlers	Higashiguchi	Oh	Fujiharu	Miura	Kim	Konno	Ideguchi	Kurata (substituted off)	Izumisawa (substituted off)	Endō (substituted off)	Hwang	Yonekura	Nagasawa	Hatsuse
28	Yokohama F. Marinos	Higashiguchi	Oh (substituted off)	Fujiharu	Miura	Kim (substituted off)	Endō	Ideguchi	Kurata	Izumisawa (substituted off)	Nagasawa	Hwang	Yonekura	Hatsuse	Akasaki
29	Albirex Niigata	Higashiguchi	Oh (substituted off)	Fujiharu	Miura	Konno	Endō	Ideguchi	Ide (substituted off)	Izumisawa	Nagasawa (substituted off)	Hwang	Yonekura	Nakahara	Akasaki
30	Urawa Red Diamonds	Higashiguchi	Hatsuse	Fujiharu	Miura	Konno	Endō (substituted off)	Ideguchi	Nakahara (substituted off)	Kurata	Akasaki (substituted off)	Hwang	Goya	Yonekura	Nagasawa
31	Vegalta Sendai	Higashiguchi	Hatsuse	Fujiharu	Miura	Konno	Nakahara (substituted off)	Ideguchi	Kurata	Endō	Akasaki (substituted off)	Nagasawa (substituted off)	Goya	Takagi	Izumisawa
32	Kawasaki Frontale	Higashiguchi	Hatsuse	Fujiharu	Miura	Konno	Endō	Ideguchi	Yonekura (substituted off)	Takagi (substituted off)	Kurata	Goya (substituted off)	Nagasawa	Oh	Akasaki
33	Consadole Sapporo	Higashiguchi	Oh (substituted off)	Fujiharu	Miura	Konno	Endō	Ideguchi	Hatsuse	Kurata	Takagi (substituted off)	Nagasawa	Goya	Ide	
34	FC Tokyo	Higashiguchi	Oh	Fujiharu	Miura	Konno	Endō	Ideguchi	Hatsuse	Kurata	Takagi (substituted off)	Nagasawa (substituted off)	Goya	Hwang	

(substituted on) = Substitute on, (substituted off) = Substitute Off, = Number of goals scored, = Yellow Card and = Red Card.

== AFC Champions League ==
As the 4th placed side in the 2016 J1 League, Gamba entered the Champions League at the play off round where they faced Malaysia's Johor Darul Ta'zim in a one-off match at Suita City Football Stadium on 7 February. Goals from Ademilson, Shun Nagasawa and Genta Miura secured a comfortable 3-0 victory and saw Gamba progress to the group stages where they were drawn in Group H along with Australian's Adelaide United, Korean side Jeju United and Chinese outfit Jiangsu Suning.

For the second season running, Gamba found themselves eliminated at the group stage. After starting their campaign strongly with an impressive 3-0 victory away to Adelaide, they were brought back to earth with a thump in round 2, being humbled 4-1 at home by Jeju United. Back to back defeats to Jiangsu Suning followed and left their hopes of progression hanging by a thread. The round 5 home clash with Adelaide offered them a lifeline and things seemed to be going smoothly when Nagasawa and Doan put them 2-0 ahead after only 12 minutes. However an error by Kim Jung-ya allowed the Australian side to grab a goal before half time, while the second half saw Yasuhito Endō miss a penalty and Adelaide grab an injury time equaliser to all but eliminate the 2008 Champions league winners. A meek 2-0 defeat to Jeju in Korea where only a large victory would have seen them qualify for the knock out stages sounded the death knell of Gamba's campaign which had started so brightly but ultimately died a slow and painful death.

=== Results ===
Round	Date	Time*	Opponents	H / A	Result F–A	Scorers	Attendance	League position
Playoff	7 February 2017	19:00	Johor Darul Ta'zim	H	3-0	Ademilson 26', Nagasawa 29', Miura 70'	8,149	N/A
1	22 February 2017	19:30	Adelaide United	A	3-0	Nagasawa 21', Konno 45'+1, McGowan o.g. 81'	5,071	1st
2	1 March 2017	19:00	Jeju United	H	1-4	Ademilson (pen.) 89'	8,211	3rd
3	15 March 2017	19:00	Jiangsu Suning	H	0-1		11,836	3rd
4	11 April 2017	19:35	Jiangsu Suning	A	0-3		37,926	4th
5	25 April 2017	19:00	Adelaide United	H	3-3	Nagasawa 6', 77', Doan 12'	9,209	4th
6	9 May 2017	19:00	Jeju United	A	0-2		3,256	4th

* = all times in local country's time.

=== Match Day Line-Ups ===
The following players appeared for Gamba Osaka during the 2017 AFC Champions League:

Player Appearances – 2017 AFC Champions League
Round	Opponent	GK	RB	LB	CB	CB	CM	CM	RW	LW	AM	CF	Substituted on	Substituted on	Substituted on
Playoff	Johor Darul Ta'zim	Higashiguchi	Oh	Fujiharu	Miura	Fábio	Ideguchi	Konno	Ademilson (substituted off)	Kurata	Endō (substituted off)	Nagasawa	Doan	Izumisawa	
1	Adelaide United	Higashiguchi	Oh	Fujiharu	Miura	Fábio	Ideguchi	Konno (substituted off)	Ademilson (substituted off)	Kurata	Endō	Nagasawa (substituted off)	Hatsuse	Takagi	Doan
		GK	RB	LB	CB	CB	CB	CM	CM	CM	CF	CF	Substituted on	Substituted on	Substituted on
2	Jeju United	Higashiguchi	Oh	Fujiharu (substituted off)	Miura	Fábio	Kim	Ideguchi (substituted off)	Konno	Endō (substituted off)	Kurata	Ademilson	Nagasawa	Hatsuse	Izumisawa
3	Jiangsu Suning	Suzuki	Hatsuse (substituted off)	Fujiharu	Miura	Fábio	Kim	Konno (substituted off)	Endō	Kurata (substituted off)	Ademilson	Nagasawa	Oh	Doan	Izumisawa
4	Jiangsu Suning	Higashiguchi	Hatsuse (substituted off)	Oh	Miura (substituted off)	Fábio	Niwa	Ideguchi	Endō	Izumisawa (substituted off)	Takagi	Nagasawa	Fujiharu	Fujimoto	Doan
		GK	RB	LB	CB	CB	CM	CM	RW	LW	AM	CF	Substituted on	Substituted on	Substituted on
5	Adelaide United	Higashiguchi	Oh	Fujiharu	Miura	Kim	Ideguchi	Endō (substituted off)	Fujimoto (substituted off)	Kurata	Doan (substituted off)	Nagasawa	Fábio	Ademilson	Izumisawa
6	Jeju United	Higashiguchi	Yonekura (substituted off)	Oh	Miura	Fábio	Ideguchi	Endō	Kurata	Izumisawa (substituted off)	Doan (substituted off)	Nagasawa	Fujiharu	Ademilson	Fujimoto

(substituted on) = Substitute on, (substituted off) = Substitute Off, = Number of goals scored, = Yellow Card and = Red Card.

== Emperor's Cup ==
Following their group stage exit from the AFC Champions League, Gamba entered the 2017 Emperor's Cup at the second round stage where they were handed a home tie against Kyushu-based side Verspah Oita. A comfortable 3-0 win secured a place in the third round and match up against J2 League's JEF United Chiba. Goals from Fabio and Izumisawa saw Gamba ease past JEF United and set up a clash against another Chiba-based side, Kashiwa Reysol in round 4. After following 3-0 behind early in the second half, Gamba rallied valiantly, however goals from Nagasawa and Ideguchi were unable to prevent them from exiting the competition before the quarter-finals for the first time since 2013.

Round	Date	Time*	Opponents	H / A	Result F-A	Scorers	Attendance
2nd round	21 June 2017	19:00	Verspah Oita	H	3-0	Fukushima o.g 59', Izumisawa 84', Hatsuse 88'	3,597
3rd round	12 July 2017	19:00	JEF United Chiba	A	2-0	Fábio 33', Izumisawa 55'	8,048
4th round	20 September 2017	19:00	Kashiwa Reysol	H	2-3	Nagasawa 60', Ideguchi 81'	5,324

* = all times Japan Standard Time.

=== Match Day Line-Ups ===
The following players appeared for Gamba Osaka during the 2017 Emperor's Cup:

Player Appearances – 2017 Emperor's Cup
Round	Opponent	GK	RB	LB	CB	CB	CM	CM	RW	LW	AM / CF	CF	Substituted on	Substituted on	Substituted on
2	Verspah Oita	Fujigaya	Ide (substituted off)	Hatsuse	Niwa	Kim	Ideguchi	Ichimaru	Fujimoto (substituted off)	Izumisawa	Ademilson	Goya (substituted off)	Fujiharu	Nagasawa	Akasaki
3	JEF United	Higashiguchi	Hatsuse	Fujiharu	Miura	Fábio	Ideguchi (substituted off)	Konno	Fujimoto (substituted off)	Kurata	Ademilson (substituted off)	Nagasawa	Kim	Izumisawa	Akasaki
4	Kashiwa Reysol	Higashiguchi	Oh (substituted off)	Fujiharu	Miura	Kim (substituted off)	Ideguchi	Konno	Kurata	Izumisawa (substituted off)	Endō	Nagasawa	Yonekura	Hatsuse	Akasaki

(substituted on) = Substitute on, (substituted off) = Substitute Off, = Number of goals scored, = Yellow Card and = Red Card.

== J.League Cup ==
As a result of their qualification for the AFC Champions League, Gamba were given a bye to the quarter-finals of the 2017 J.League Cup where they were paired with Kansai rivals, Vissel Kobe. Despite being without international players; Higashiguchi, Miura and Ideguchi, Gamba were able to prevail 2-0 on aggregate over their neighbours. A goalless first-leg in Kobe was followed by a 2-0 home win with the decisive goals coming from Nagasawa and Izumisawa. This set up another derby match in the semi-finals, this time against city rivals, Cerezo. Following a 2-2 draw away in the first leg, Gamba appeared to be heading towards the final with the scores tied at one apiece going into extra time in the return leg, however Yasuki Kimoto's 95th-minute winner ended Gamba's hopes of silverware in 2017.

Round	Date	Time*	Opponents	H / A	Result F-A	Scorers	Attendance
QF	30 August 2017	19:00	Vissel Kobe	A	0-0		7,577
QF	3 September 2017	19:00	Vissel Kobe	H	2-0	Nagasawa 46', Izumisawa 64'	12,310
SF	4 October 2017	19:00	Cerezo Osaka	A	2-2	Akasaki 16', Ide 86'	21,800
SF	8 October 2017	14:00	Cerezo Osaka	H	1-2	Izumisawa 60'	31,578

=== Match Day Line-Ups ===
The following players appeared for Gamba Osaka during the 2017 J.League Cup:

Player Appearances – 2017 J.League Cup
Round	Opponent	GK	RB	LB	CB	CB	CM	CM	RW	LW	AM / FW	FW	Substituted on	Substituted on	Substituted on
QF	Vissel Kobe	Fujigaya	Oh	Fujiharu	Fábio	Kim	Konno	Ichimaru	Yonekura (substituted off)	Izumisawa (substituted off)	Kurata	Hwang (substituted off)	Endō	Ademilson	Nagasawa
QF	Vissel Kobe	Fujigaya	Oh	Fujiharu	Fábio	Kim	Konno	Endō	Kurata (substituted off)	Izumisawa	Ademilson (substituted off)	Nagasawa	Hwang	Yonekura	
SF	Cerezo Osaka	Fujigaya	Hatsuse	Fujiharu	Miura	Konno	Nakahara (substituted off)	Endō	Ichimaru	Izumisawa (substituted off)	Akasaki (substituted off)	Nagasawa	Goya	Yonekura	Ide
SF	Cerezo Osaka	Fujigaya	Hatsuse	Fujiharu	Miura	Konno	Nakahara	Endō	Yonekura (substituted off)	Izumisawa (substituted off)	Akasaki (substituted off)	Nagasawa	Ide	Hirao	Noda

(substituted on) = Substitute on, (substituted off) = Substitute Off, = Number of goals scored, = Yellow Card and = Red Card.

== Squad statistics ==
No.	Pos.	Name	League		Emperor's Cup		J.League Cup		Champions League		Total		Discipline	
No.	Pos.	Name	Apps	Goals	Apps	Goals	Apps	Goals	Apps	Goals	Apps	Goals	Yellow card	Red card
1	GK	(Japan) Masaaki Higashiguchi	33	0	2	0	0	0	6	0	41	0	4	0
2	DF	(Japan) Genta Miura	34	2	2	0	2	0	7	1	45	3	4	0
3	DF	(Brazil) Fábio	22	1	1	1	2	0	6(1)	0	31(1)	2	4	0
4	DF	(Japan) Hiroki Fujiharu	32(1)	2	2(1)	0	4	0	5(2)	0	43(4)	2	3	0
5	DF	(Japan) Daiki Niwa	1(4)	0	1	0	0	0	1	0	3(4)	0	0	0
6	DF	(South Korea) Kim Jung-ya	11(4)	1	2(1)	0	2	0	3	0	18(5)	1	2	0
7	MF	(Japan) Yasuhito Endō (c)	27(4)	1	1	0	3(1)	0	7	0	38(5)	1	3	0
8	MF	(Japan) Yosuke Ideguchi	29(1)	4	3	1	0	0	6	0	38(1)	5	4	0
9	FW	(Brazil) Ademilson	14(8)	4	2	0	1(1)	0	4(2)	2	21(11)	6	3	0
10	MF	(Japan) Shu Kurata	33	8	2	0	2	0	6	0	43	8	4	0
11	FW	(South Korea) Hwang Ui-jo	9(4)	3	0	0	1(1)	0	0	0	10(5)	3	1	0
13	FW	(Japan) Hiroto Goya	2(7)	1	1	0	0(1)	0	0	0	3(8)	1	0	0
14	DF	(Japan) Koki Yonekura	1(12)	0	0(1)	0	2(2)	0	1	0	4(15)	0	2	0
15	MF	(Japan) Yasuyuki Konno	23(1)	2	2	0	3	0	4	1	33(1)	3	6	0
16	GK	(Japan) Ken Tajiri	0(1)	0	0	0	0	0	0	0	0(1)	0	0	0
18	GK	(Japan) Yōsuke Fujigaya	1	0	1	0	4	0	0	0	6	0	1	0
19	GK	(Japan) Ryota Suzuki	0	0	0	0	0	0	1	0	1	0	0	0
20	FW	(Japan) Shun Nagasawa	25(9)	10	2(1)	1	3(1)	1	6(1)	4	36(12)	16	1	0
22	DF	(South Korea) Oh Jae-suk	26(3)	0	1	0	2	0	6(1)	0	35(4)	0	5	0
23	MF	(Japan) Shogo Nakahara	2(1)	0	0	0	2	0	0	0	4(1)	0	0	0
24	MF	(Japan) Haruya Ide	1(1)	0	1	0	0(2)	1	0	0	2(3)	1	0	0
25	MF	(Japan) Jungo Fujimoto	10(4)	1	2	0	0	0	1(2)	0	13(6)	1	1	0
26	MF	(Japan) Naoya Senoo	0	0	0	0	0	0	0	0	0	0	0	0
27	MF	(Japan) Yuto Mori	0	0	0	0	0	0	0	0	0	0	0	0
28	MF	(Japan) Shota Yomesaka	0	0	0	0	0	0	0	0	0	0	0	0
29	FW	(Japan) Hiromu Kori	0	0	0	0	0	0	0	0	0	0	0	0
30	DF	(Japan) So Hirao	0	0	0	0	0(1)	0	0	0	0(1)	0	0	0
31	GK	(Japan) Mizuki Hayashi	0	0	0	0	0	0	0	0	0	0	0	0
32	DF	(Japan) Hiroki Noda	0	0	0	0	0(1)	0	0	0	0(1)	0	0	0
33	FW	(Japan) Kazunari Ichimi	0	0	0	0	0	0	0	0	0	0	0	0
34	MF	(Japan) Takahiro Ko	0	0	0	0	0	0	0	0	0	0	0	0
35	DF	(Japan) Ryo Hatsuse	13(6)	0	2(1)	1	2	0	2(2)	0	19(9)	1	2	0
36	MF	(Japan) Mizuki Ichimaru	1	0	1	0	1(1)	0	0	0	3(1)	0	0	0
37	FW	(Japan) Akito Takagi	3(4)	0	0	0	0	0	1(1)	0	4(5)	0	0	0
38	MF	(Japan) Ritsu Doan	5(5)	3	0	0	0	0	2(4)	1	7(9)	4	1	0
39	MF	(Japan) Jin Izumisawa	7(14)	2	2(1)	2	4	2	2(4)	0	15(19)	6	1	0
40	MF	(Japan) Ryotaro Meshino	0	0	0	0	0	0	0	0	0	0	0	0
42	DF	(South Korea) Bae Soo-yong	0	0	0	0	0	0	0	0	0	0	0	0
44	MF	(Japan) Reo Takae	0	0	0	0	0	0	0	0	0	0	0	0
53	FW	(Japan) Shuhei Akasaki	8(6)	1	0(3)	0	2	1	0	0	10(9)	2	0	0
55	DF	(Japan) Takaharu Nishino	0	0	0	0	0	0	0	0	0	0	0	0
55	FW	(Brazil) Patric	1	0	0	0	0	0	0	0	1	0	0	0
—	—	Own goals	–	2	–	1	–	0	–	1	–	4	–	–

Statistics accurate as of match played on 2 December 2017.

=== Goalscorers ===
As of 2 December 2017

Rank	Position	Name	J1 League	Emperor's Cup	J.League Cup	Champions League	Total
1	FW	(Japan) Shun Nagasawa	10	1	1	4	16
2	MF	(Japan) Shu Kurata	8	0	0	0	8
3	FW	(Brazil) Ademilson	4	0	0	2	6
3	MF	(Japan) Jin Izumisawa	2	2	2	0	6
5	MF	(Japan) Yosuke Ideguchi	4	1	0	0	5
6	MF	(Japan) Ritsu Doan	3	0	0	1	4
6	N/A	Own goal	2	1	0	1	4
8	FW	(South Korea) Hwang Ui-jo	3	0	0	0	3
8	MF	(Japan) Yasuyuki Konno	2	0	0	1	3
8	DF	(Japan) Genta Miura	2	0	0	1	3
11	FW	(Japan) Shuhei Akasaki	1	0	1	0	2
11	DF	(Brazil) Fábio	1	1	0	0	2
11	DF	(Japan) Hiroki Fujiharu	2	0	0	0	2
14	MF	(Japan) Yasuhito Endō	1	0	0	0	1
14	MF	(Japan) Jungo Fujimoto	1	0	0	0	1
14	FW	(Japan) Hiroto Goya	1	0	0	0	1
14	DF	(Japan) Ryo Hatsuse	0	1	0	0	1
14	MF	(Japan) Haruya Ide	0	0	1	0	1
14	DF	(South Korea) Kim Jung-ya	1	0	0	0	1
Total			47	7	5	10	69

=== Assists ===
As of 2 December 2017

Rank	Position	Name	J1 League	Emperor's Cup	J.League Cup	Champions League	Total
1	MF	(Japan) Yosuke Ideguchi	7	0	0	1	8
2	MF	(Japan) Yasuhito Endō	3	0	0	2	5
3	MF	(Japan) Shu Kurata	4	0	0	0	4
4	DF	(Japan) Hiroki Fujiharu	2	0	0	1	3
4	DF	(Japan) Ryo Hatsuse	3	0	0	0	3
4	FW	(Japan) Shun Nagasawa	3	0	0	0	3
4	DF	(South Korea) Oh Jae-suk	2	0	0	1	3
8	FW	(Brazil) Ademilson	2	0	0	0	2
8	MF	(Japan) Jungo Fujimoto	2	0	0	0	2
8	MF	(Japan) Yasuyuki Konno	1	0	0	1	2
8	DF	(Japan) Genta Miura	2	0	0	0	2
12	GK	(Japan) Masaaki Higashiguchi	1	0	0	0	1
12	FW	(South Korea) Hwang Ui-jo	1	0	0	0	1
12	MF	(Japan) Jin Izumisawa	1	0	0	0	1
Total			33	0	0	6	39
