= Marcos de la Riva =

Spanish footballer (born 2006)

Personal information
- Full name: Marcos de la Riva Geijo
- Date of birth: 25 May 2006 (age 20)
- Place of birth: León, Spain
- Position: Midfielder

Team information
- Current team: Júpiter Leonés
- Number: 8

Youth career
- Cultural Leonesa

Senior career*
Years	Team	Apps	(Gls)
2025–	Júpiter Leonés	11	(0)
2025–	Cultural Leonesa	0	(0)
- * Club domestic league appearances and goals as of 3 December 2025

Marcos de la Riva Geijo (born 25 May 2006) is a Spanish professional footballer who plays as a midfielder for Júpiter Leonés.

== Career ==
Born in León, Castile and León, de la Riva was a Cultural y Deportiva Leonesa youth graduate. On 19 June 2025, he was promoted to farm team Júpiter Leonés in Tercera Federación.

De la Riva made his senior debut with Júpiter on 6 September 2025, starting in a 1–0 home loss to CD La Virgen del Camino. A regular starter for the B-team, he made his debut with the main squad on 3 December, starting in a 4–2 home win over FC Andorra, for the season's Copa del Rey.
