= Guzmán Ortega =

Spanish footballer (born 2004)

Personal information
- Full name: Guzmán Ortega Sanjuan
- Date of birth: 12 January 2004 (age 22)
- Place of birth: Palencia, Spain
- Position: Right-back

Team information
- Current team: Avilés Industrial (on loan from Cultural Leonesa)
- Number: 2

Youth career
- 2009–2022: CIA
- 2022–2023: Cultural Leonesa

Senior career*
Years	Team	Apps	(Gls)
2022	Palencia	1	(0)
2023–2024	Júpiter Leonés	27	(5)
2024–	Cultural Leonesa	20	(0)
2025–	→ Avilés Industrial (loan)	28	(1)
- * Club domestic league appearances and goals as of 9 June 2026

Guzmán Ortega Sanjuan (born 12 January 2004), sometimes known as just Guzmán, is a Spanish footballer who plays as a right-back for Real Avilés Industrial CF, on loan from Cultural y Deportiva Leonesa.

== Career ==
Born in Palencia, Castile and León, Guzmán began his career with local Club Internacional de la Amistad at the age of five. On 30 April 2022, he made his senior debut with Palencia CF (as the club had an affiliation agreement with CIA), starting in a 2–0 Tercera División RFEF away loss to CD Numancia B.

In July 2022, Guzmán left CIA and joined Cultural y Deportiva Leonesa, initially for the Juvenil squad. He started to feature with farm team Júpiter Leonés in the following year, before renewing his contract until 2026 on 28 February 2024.

Guzmán became a first team member of Cultu ahead of the 2024–25 Primera Federación, and further extended his link until 2027 on 11 March 2025. A backup to Víctor García, he appeared in 21 matches as the club achieved promotion to Segunda División.

Guzmán made his professional debut on 15 August 2025, coming on as a late substitute for Juan Larios in a 5–1 away loss to Burgos CF. On 1 September, however, he was loaned to third division side Real Avilés Industrial CF, for one year.

== Personal life ==
Ortega's father Fernando was also a footballer and a defender. He notably represented CF Palencia for the most of his career.
