= Shuhei Akasaki =

Japanese footballer (born 1991)

Personal information
- Full name: Shuhei Akasaki
- Date of birth: 1 September 1991 (age 35)
- Place of birth: Ichikikushikino, Kagoshima Prefecture, Japan
- Height: 1.74 m (5 ft 9 in)
- Position: Forward

Youth career
- 2007–2009: Saga Higashi High School

College career
Years	Team	Apps	(Gls)
2010–2013	University of Tsukuba		

Senior career*
Years	Team	Apps	(Gls)
2013–2017	Kashima Antlers	62	(14)
2017	→ Gamba Osaka (loan)	14	(1)
2018–2019	Kawasaki Frontale	1	(0)
2019	→ Nagoya Grampus (loan)	21	(5)
2020–2022	Vegalta Sendai	47	(2)
2022	Nankatsu SC	2	(0)
Medal record
Kashima Antlers
Winner	J1 League	2016
Runner-up	J1 League	2017
Winner	J.League Cup	2015
Winner	Emperor's Cup	2016
Kawasaki Frontale
Winner	J1 League	2018
- * Club domestic league appearances and goals

Shuhei Akasaki (赤﨑 秀平, Akasaki Shūhei; born 1 September 1991) is a Japanese former professional footballer who played as a forward.

== Career ==
=== Kashima Antlers ===
Akasaki joined the Kashima Antlers on loan from University of Tsukuba on 17 April 2013. Two days after his loan expired, the Antlers signed Akasaki on a free transfer. Akasaki spent two and a half years more at the club, scoring 23 goals in 92 appearances.

=== Gamba Osaka ===
On 12 March 2017, Akasaki was loaned out to Gamba Osaka. In the time he spent there, Akasaki scored 2 goals in 19 appearances.

=== Kawasaki Frontale ===
On 1 February 2018, Akasaki moved to Kawasaki Frontale on a free transfer.

== Career statistics ==
Updated to 21 February 2019.

Club	Season	League		Emperor's Cup		J. League Cup		AFC		Other^{1}		Total	
Club	Season	Apps	Goals	Apps	Goals	Apps	Goals	Apps	Goals	Apps	Goals	Apps	Goals
Kashima Antlers	2013	1	0	-		0	0	-		-		1	0
Kashima Antlers	2014	15	5	1	0	3	2	-		-		19	7
Kashima Antlers	2015	22	7	2	0	5	2	3	1	-		32	10
Kashima Antlers	2016	24	2	5	2	4	0	0	0	7	2	40	6
Kashima Antlers	2017	0	0	0	0	0	0	1	0	0	0	1	0
Total		62	14	8	2	12	4	4	1	7	2	93	23
Gamba Osaka	2017	14	1	3	0	2	1	0	0	-		19	2
Total		14	1	3	0	2	1	0	0	-		19	2
Kawasaki Frontale	2018	1	0	1	0	2	0	2	0	-		6	0
Total		1	0	1	0	2	0	2	0	-		6	0
Career Total		75	15	12	2	16	5	6	1	7	2	116	25

^{1}Includes Suruga Bank Championship, J. League Championship and FIFA Club World Cup appearances.

== Honours ==
=== Kashima Antlers ===
- Suruga Bank Championship: 2013
- J. League Cup: 2015
- J.League: 2016
- Emperor's Cup: 2016
- Japanese Super Cup: 2017
