= Iván Casquero =

Spanish footballer

Personal information
- Full name: Iván Casquero Cosío
- Date of birth: 14 July 1979 (age 47)
- Place of birth: Gijón, Spain
- Height: 1.68 m (5 ft 6 in)
- Position: Left back

Youth career
- Oviedo

Senior career*
Years	Team	Apps	(Gls)
1996	Oviedo	1	(0)
1998–2000	Oviedo B	52	(0)
2000–2001	Eibar	17	(0)
2001	Numancia	9	(0)
2002–2007	Cultural Leonesa	191	(3)
2007–2009	Fuerteventura	71	(0)
2009	Estepona	15	(0)
2010–2011	Universidad LP	41	(1)
2012	Caudal		
Total		397	(4)
- * Club domestic league appearances and goals

Iván Casquero Cosío (born 14 July 1979) is a Spanish former footballer who played as a left back.

== Playing career ==
Born in Gijón, Asturias, Casquero played youth football at Real Oviedo. On 26 May 1996, while still a junior, he made his first and only appearance in La Liga, coming on as a late substitute for Thomas Christiansen in a 3–1 away loss against CP Mérida.

In the 2000–01 and 2001–02 seasons, Casquero played a combined 26 matches in Segunda División matches for SD Eibar and CD Numancia. He all but competed in Segunda División B until his retirement at the age of 32, representing mainly Cultural y Deportiva Leonesa.

== Coaching career ==
Casquero returned to Oviedo after retiring, and worked at the club as youth physio and assistant coach to their reserves.
