= Shogo Nakahara =

Japanese footballer (born 1994)

Shogo Nakahara 中原 彰吾
Personal information
- Full name: Shogo Nakahara
- Date of birth: May 19, 1994 (age 32)
- Place of birth: Sapporo, Japan
- Height: 1.77 m (5 ft 9 1/2 in)
- Position: Defensive midfielder

Team information
- Current team: Vegalta Sendai
- Number: 37

Youth career
- Consadole Sapporo Youth

Senior career*
Years	Team	Apps	(Gls)
2013–2019	Hokkaido Consadole Sapporo	34	(1)
2013	→ Khonkaen (loan)	11	(1)
2014–2015	→ J. League U-22 (loan)	9	(1)
2017	→ Gamba Osaka U-23 (loan)	18	(0)
2017	→ Gamba Osaka (loan)	3	(0)
2018	→ V-Varen Nagasaki (loan)	15	(2)
2019–	Vegalta Sendai	1	(0)
- * Club domestic league appearances and goals as of 20:08, 7 December 2019 (UTC)

Shogo Nakahara (中原 彰吾, Nakahara Shōgo; born May 19, 1994 in Sapporo) is a Japanese football player who plays for Vegalta Sendai.

== Club statistics ==
Updated to 18 February 2019.

Club performance			League		Cup		League Cup		Continental		Total	
Season	Club	League	Apps	Goals	Apps	Goals	Apps	Goals	Apps	Goals	Apps	Goals
Japan			League		Emperor's Cup		J. League Cup		Asia		Total	
2013	Consadole Sapporo	J2 League	3	0	0	0	-		-		3	0
2014	Consadole Sapporo	J2 League	16	0	2	0	-		-		18	0
2015	Consadole Sapporo	J2 League	11	0	2	0	-		-		13	0
2016	Hokkaido Consadole Sapporo	J2 League	4	1	1	1	-		-		5	2
2017	Gamba Osaka	J1 League	3	0	0	0	2	0	0	0	5	0
2018	V-Varen Nagasaki	J1 League	15	2	1	0	3	0	-		19	2
Career total			52	3	6	1	5	0	0	0	63	4

Reserves performance

Club performance			League		Total	
Season	Club	League	Apps	Goals	Apps	Goals
Japan			League		Total	
2014	J.League U-22 Selection	J3 League	7	1	7	1
2015	J.League U-22 Selection	J3 League	2	0	2	0
2017	Gamba Osaka U-23	J3 League	18	0	18	0
Career total			27	1	27	1
