= Akito Takagi =

Japanese footballer

Akito Takagi 髙木 彰人
Personal information
- Full name: Akito Takagi
- Date of birth: 4 August 1997 (age 29)
- Place of birth: Sakai, Osaka, Japan
- Height: 1.75 m (5 ft 9 in)
- Position: Forward

Team information
- Current team: SC Sagamihara
- Number: 14

Youth career
- SS Create
- 2010–2015: Gamba Osaka

Senior career*
Years	Team	Apps	(Gls)
2014–2020	Gamba Osaka	13	(2)
2016–2020	Gamba Osaka U-23	73	(17)
2019	→ Montedio Yamagata (loan)	11	(1)
2020	→ Matsumoto Yamaga (loan)	12	(0)
2021–2024	Thespakusatsu Gunma	64	(5)
2024-	SC Sagamihara	56	(5)

International career
2014	Japan U-18		
2016	Japan U-19		
2017	Japan U-20	3	(0)
2018	Japan U-23	4	(0)
Medal record
Gamba Osaka
Winner	J1 League	2014
Winner	J.League Cup	2014
Runner-up	J.League Cup	2016
Winner	Emperor's Cup	2014
- * Club domestic league appearances and goals as of 1 January 2026

Akito Takagi (髙木 彰人, Takagi Akito) is a Japanese football player. He currently plays for SC Sagamihara in the J3 League. His playing position is either attacking midfielder or forward.

== Club career ==
Born and raised in Osaka, Takagi came through the youth ranks at Gamba Osaka and joined the senior squad for the first time in 2014 at the age of 17. He made his debut on 16 April 2014 in a 2-0 J.League Cup victory away to Sagan Tosu. He started the game and was replaced by Akihiro Sato after 71 minutes.

He didn't play at all in 2015 or 2016 before finding himself in Gamba's starting line up towards the back end of the 2017 season where he played a total of 7 league matches and 2 AFC Champions League games without getting his name on the scoresheet.

Gamba changed head coaches ahead of the 2018 season with Brazilian Levir Culpi replacing the long serving Kenta Hasegawa and this saw a big reduction in Takagi's top team playing time as neither Culpi nor mid-season replacement Tsuneyasu Miyamoto could find space for Takagi in their starting line-ups and he was restricted to a mere 1 J.League Cup substitute appearance against Urawa Red Diamonds.

In 2016, Gamba's Under-23 side joined J3 League along with the reserve teams of FC Tokyo and Cerezo Osaka. Takagi featured for them often in their inaugural campaign, netting once in 23 appearances as they finished 9th in the overall standings. The team was run more as a youth team in 2017 and owing to this as well as his involvement with Gamba's first team, he only played once throughout the year. However in 2018, it was back to being a reserve team again and Takagi put in a stronger showing, playing all 32 games and bagging 5 goals as his team finished 6th in the final league table.

== National team career ==
In May 2017, Takagi was elected Japan U-20 national team for 2017 U-20 World Cup. At this tournament, he played 2 matches.

== Club statistics ==
Last update: 2 December 2018

Club performance			League		Cup		League Cup		Continental		Other		Total	
Season	Club	League	Apps	Goals	Apps	Goals	Apps	Goals	Apps	Goals	Apps	Goals	Apps	Goals
Japan			League		Emperor's Cup		League Cup		Asia		Super Cup		Total	
2014	Gamba Osaka	J1	0	0	0	0	1	0	-		-		1	0
2015	Gamba Osaka	J1	0	0	0	0	0	0	0	0	0	0	0	0
2016	Gamba Osaka	J1	0	0	0	0	0	0	0	0	0	0	0	0
2017	Gamba Osaka	J1	7	0	0	0	0	0	2	0	-		9	0
2018	Gamba Osaka	J1	0	0	0	0	1	0	-		-		1	0
2019	Gamba Osaka	J1	0	0	0	0	0	0	-		-		0	0
Career total			7	0	0	0	2	0	2	0	0	0	11	0

== Reserves performance ==
Club performance			League		Total	
Season	Club	League	Apps	Goals	Apps	Goals
Japan			League		Total	
2016	Gamba Osaka U-23	J3	23	1	23	1
2017	Gamba Osaka U-23	J3	1	0	1	0
2018	Gamba Osaka U-23	J3	32	5	32	5
2019	Gamba Osaka U-23	J3	0	0	0	0
Career total			56	6	56	6

== Honors ==
Gamba Osaka

- J. League Cup - 2014
