= 2017 J1 League =

25th season of J1 League

Meiji Yasuda J1 League
- Season: 2017
- Champions: Kawasaki Frontale (1st title)
- Relegated: Ventforet Kofu; Albirex Niigata; Omiya Ardija
- AFC Champions League: Kawasaki Frontale; Kashima Antlers; Cerezo Osaka; Kashiwa Reysol
- Matches: 306
- Goals: 793 (2.59 per match)
- Top goalscorer: Yu Kobayashi (Kawasaki Frontale) (23 goals)
- Biggest home win: Urawa 7-0 Sendai (7 April 2017)
- Biggest away win: Niigata 1-6 Urawa (14 May 2017)
- Highest scoring: Urawa 7-0 Sendai (7 April 2017); Niigata 1-6 Urawa (14 May 2017); Urawa 4-3 Hiroshima (1 July 2017); Kawasaki 2-5 Iwata (29 July 2017)
- Longest winning run: Kashiwa Reysol (8 matches)
- Longest unbeaten run: Kawasaki Frontale (15 matches)
- Longest winless run: Albirex Niigata (16 matches)
- Longest losing run: Omiya Ardija; Consadole Sapporo; Albirex Niigata (6 matches each)
- Highest attendance: 57,447; Urawa 0-1 Kashima (4 May 2017)
- Lowest attendance: 4,692; Kofu 2-3 Kobe (29 October 2017)
- Total attendance: 5,778,178
- Average attendance: 18,883

The 2017 J1 League (known as the 2017 Meiji Yasuda J1 League (2017 明治安田生命J1リーグ) for sponsorship reasons) was the 25th season of the J1 League, the top Japanese professional league for association football clubs, since its establishment in 1992. This was third season of J1 League as renamed from J. League Division 1. The season began on 25 February 2017 and ended on 2 December. Fixtures for the 2017 season were announced on 26 January 2017.

Kashima Antlers were the defending champions. Consadole Sapporo, Shimizu S-Pulse and Cerezo Osaka entered as the three promoted teams from the 2016 J2 League.

The league was won by Kawasaki Frontale, winning their first major title while in J1 and 40 years after their first season in the Japanese top division.

== Clubs ==
Locations of the 2017 J1 League teams
Greater Tokyo Area J1 League teams

A total of 18 clubs participated in this season, including 15 sides from the 2016 season and three promoted from the 2016 J2 League. These included the two top teams; Consadole Sapporo and Shimizu S-Pulse from the J2 League, and the winners of the play-offs; Cerezo Osaka.

The three promoted clubs replace Nagoya Grampus, Shonan Bellmare and Avispa Fukuoka. Former J1 League champion Nagoya Grampus were relegated to the J2 League for the first time in their history.

=== Stadiums and locations ===
Club	Location	Stadium	Capacity
Albirex Niigata	Niigata & Seirō	Denka Big Swan Stadium	42,300
Cerezo Osaka	Osaka & Sakai	Yanmar Stadium	47,816
Consadole Sapporo	All Hokkaido (Note: centering on Sapporo)	Sapporo Dome	41,484
FC Tokyo	Tokyo	Ajinomoto Stadium	49,970
Gamba Osaka	Northern Osaka Prefecture (Note: Suita, Ibaraki, Takatsuki, Toyonaka, Ikeda, Settsu, Minoh)	Suita City Football Stadium	39,694
Júbilo Iwata	Iwata	Yamaha Stadium	15,165
Kashima Antlers	Southeast Ibaraki Prefecture (Note: Kashima, Kamisu, Itako, Hokota, Namegata)	Kashima Soccer Stadium	40,728
Kashiwa Reysol	Kashiwa	Kashiwa Soccer Stadium	15,900
Kawasaki Frontale	Kawasaki	Todoroki Athletics Stadium	26,232
Omiya Ardija	Saitama	NACK5 Stadium	15,500
Sagan Tosu	Tosu	Tosu Stadium	24,490
Sanfrecce Hiroshima	Hiroshima	Hiroshima Big Arch	50,000
Shimizu S-Pulse	Shizuoka	IAI Stadium Nihondaira	20,339
Urawa Red Diamonds	Saitama	Saitama Stadium 2002	63,700
Vegalta Sendai	Sendai	Yurtec Stadium	19,694
Ventforet Kofu	All Yamanashi Prefecture (Note: centering on Kōfu and Nirasaki)	Yamanashi Chuo Bank Stadium	17,000
Vissel Kobe	Kobe	Noevir Stadium	30,132
Yokohama F. Marinos	Yokohama & Yokosuka	Nissan Stadium	72,327

=== Personnel and kits ===
Club	Manager	Captain	Kit manufacturer	Front shirt sponsor
Albirex Niigata	(Japan) Wagner Lopes	(Japan) Kazunari Ono	Adidas	HAPPY Turn's
Cerezo Osaka	(South Korea) Yoon Jong-hwan	(Japan) Yoichiro Kakitani	Puma	Yanmar
Consadole Sapporo	(Japan) Shuhei Yomoda	(Japan) Hiroki Miyazawa	Kappa	Shiroi Koibito
FC Tokyo	(Japan) Takayoshi Amma	(Japan) Masato Morishige	Umbro	Lifeval
Gamba Osaka	(Japan) Kenta Hasegawa	(Japan) Yasuhito Endō	Umbro	Panasonic
Júbilo Iwata	(Japan) Hiroshi Nanami	(Japan) Kota Ueda	Puma	Yamaha
Kashima Antlers	(Japan) Go Oiwa	(Japan) Mitsuo Ogasawara	Nike	Lixil
Kashiwa Reysol	(Japan) Takahiro Shimotaira	(Japan) Hidekazu Otani	Yonex	Hitachi
Kawasaki Frontale	(Japan) Toru Oniki	(Japan) Yu Kobayashi	Puma	Fujitsu (home); Arrows (away)
Omiya Ardija	(Japan) Masatada Ishii	(Japan) Kosuke Kikuchi	Under Armour	D-point
Sagan Tosu	(Italy) Massimo Ficcadenti	(Japan) Yohei Toyoda	New Balance	DHC
Sanfrecce Hiroshima	(Sweden) Jan Jönsson	(Japan) Toshihiro Aoyama	Nike	EDION
Shimizu S-Pulse	(Japan) Shinji Kobayashi	(North Korea) Jong Tae-se	Puma	Suzuyo
Urawa Red Diamonds	(Japan) Takafumi Hori	(Japan) Yuki Abe	Nike	Polus
Vegalta Sendai	(Japan) Susumu Watanabe	(Japan) Shingo Tomita	Adidas	Iris Ohyama
Ventforet Kofu	(Japan) Tatsuma Yoshida	(Japan) Hideomi Yamamoto	Mizuno	Hakubaku
Vissel Kobe	(Japan) Takayuki Yoshida	(Japan) Kazuma Watanabe	Asics	Rakuten
Yokohama F. Marinos	(France) Erick Mombaerts	(Japan) Manabu Saitō	Adidas	Nissan

=== Managerial changes ===
Team	Outgoing manager	Manner of departure	Date of vacancy	Position in table	Incoming manager	Date of appointment
Albirex Niigata	(Japan) Fumitake Miura	Resigned	7 May 2017	17th	(Japan) Wagner Lopes	11 May 2017
Omiya Ardija	(Japan) Hiroki Shibuya	Sacked	28 May 2017	18th	(Japan) Akira Ito	28 May 2017
Kashima Antlers	(Japan) Masatada Ishii	Sacked	31 May 2017	7th	(Japan) Go Oiwa	31 May 2017
Sanfrecce Hiroshima	(Japan) Hajime Moriyasu	Resigned	4 July 2017	17th	(Sweden) Jan Jönsson	10 July 2017
Urawa Red Diamonds	(Serbia) Mihailo Petrović	Sacked	31 July 2017	8th	(Japan) Takafumi Hori	31 July 2017
Vissel Kobe	(Brazil) Nelsinho Baptista	Sacked	16 August 2017	11th	(Japan) Takayuki Yoshida	16 August 2017
FC Tokyo	(Japan) Yoshiyuki Shinoda	Sacked	10 September 2017	10th	(Japan) Takayoshi Amma	10 September 2017
Omiya Ardija	(Japan) Akira Ito	Sacked	5 November 2017	17th	(Japan) Masatada Ishii	5 November 2017

=== Foreign players ===
The total number of foreign players is restricted to five per club. For matchday squad registration, a club can register up to four foreign players, but a maximum of three can be from outside the AFC. Players from J.League partner nations (Thailand, Vietnam, Myanmar, Cambodia, Singapore, Indonesia, Iran, Malaysia, and Qatar) are exempt from these club registration and matchday squad registration restrictions.

- Players name in **bold** indicate players that were registered during the mid-season transfer window.
- Players name in ITALICS indicate players that were out of squad or left their respective clubs during the mid-season transfer window.

Club	Player 1	Player 2	Player 3	Player 4	Player 5	Other	Former players
Albirex Niigata	(Brazil) **Douglas Tanque**	(Brazil) Rony	(Brazil) Thiago Galhardo	(South Korea) Song Ju-hun		(Peru) Frank Romero	(Brazil) Jean Patrick
Cerezo Osaka	(Brazil) Ricardo Santos	(Brazil) Souza	(Croatia) Matej Jonjić	(South Korea) Ahn Joon-soo	(South Korea) Kim Jin-hyeon		
Consadole Sapporo	(Brazil) Diego Macedo	(Brazil) Jonathan Reis	(England) **Jay Bothroyd**	(South Korea) Gu Sung-yun	(South Korea) Kim Min-tae	(Thailand) **Chanathip Songkrasin**	(Brazil) Julinho
FC Tokyo	(Brazil) **Lipe Veloso**	(Nigeria) Peter Utaka	(South Korea) **Jang Hyun-soo**	(South Korea) Yu In-soo		(Thailand) **Jakkit Wachpirom**	(Australia) Nathan Burns
Gamba Osaka	(Brazil) Ademilson	(Brazil) Fábio	(South Korea) Bae Soo-yong	(South Korea) **Hwang Ui-jo**	(South Korea) Oh Jae-suk	(South Korea) Kim Jung-ya	
Júbilo Iwata	(Brazil) Adaílton	(Poland) Krzysztof Kamiński	(Uzbekistan) Fozil Musaev				
Kashima Antlers	(Brazil) Leandro	(Brazil) Léo Silva	(Brazil) Pedro Júnior	(South Korea) Kwoun Sun-tae		(Brazil) Bueno	
Kashiwa Reysol	(Brazil) Cristiano	(Brazil) Diego Oliveira	(Brazil) Ramon Lopes	(South Korea) **Kim Bo-kyung**	(South Korea) Yun Suk-young		(Brazil) Dudu
Kawasaki Frontale	(Brazil) Eduardo	(Brazil) Eduardo Neto	(Brazil) Elsinho	(Brazil) Rhayner	(South Korea) Jung Sung-ryong	(Philippines) Jefferson Tabinas	
Omiya Ardija	(Brazil) **Cauê**	(Brazil) **Marcelo Toscano**	(Brazil) Mateus	(South Korea) **Kim Dong-su**			(Serbia) Dragan Mrđa (Slovenia) Nejc Pecnik
Sagan Tosu	(Colombia) Víctor Ibarbo	(South Korea) **An Yong-woo**	(South Korea) Cho Dong-geon	(South Korea) **Jung Seung-hyun**	(South Korea) Kim Min-hyeok		(Argentina) Franco Sbuttoni
Sanfrecce Hiroshima	(Australia) **Nathan Burns**	(Brazil) Anderson Lopes	(Brazil) Felipe	(Brazil) **Patric**	(Croatia) Mihael Mikić		
Shimizu S-Pulse	(Australia) Mitch Duke	(Brazil) Freire	(Brazil) Kanu	(Brazil) Tiago Alves		(North Korea) Jong Tae-se	(South Korea) Byeon Jun-byum
Urawa Red Diamonds	(Brazil) **Maurício Antônio**	(Brazil) Rafael Silva	(Slovenia) Zlatan Ljubijankič				
Ventforet Kofu	(Australia) Billy Konstantinidis	(Brazil) Dudu	(Brazil) Éder Lima	(Brazil) **Lins**			(Australia) Oliver Bozanic (Brazil) Gabriel Rodrigues (Brazil) Junior Barros (Brazil) Wilson
Vegalta Sendai	(Brazil) Crislan	(Brazil) **Vinícius**	(South Korea) Lee Yun-oh			(North Korea) Ryang Yong-gi	(Brazil) Pablo Diogo
Vissel Kobe	(Brazil) Leandro	(Brazil) Nílton	(Brazil) Wescley	(Germany) **Lukas Podolski**	(South Korea) Kim Seung-gyu		
Yokohama F. Marinos	(Australia) Miloš Degenek	(Curaçao) Quenten Martinus	(North Macedonia) David Babunski	(Portugal) Hugo Vieira	(South Korea) Park Jeong-su	(Russia) **Ippey Shinozuka**	

== Results ==
=== League table ===
Pos	Team	Pld	W	D	L	GF	GA	GD	Pts	Qualification or relegation
1	Kawasaki Frontale (C)	34	21	9	4	71	32	+39	72	Champions League group stage
2	Kashima Antlers	34	23	3	8	53	31	+22	72	Champions League group stage
3	Cerezo Osaka	34	19	6	9	65	43	+22	63	Champions League group stage
4	Kashiwa Reysol	34	18	8	8	49	33	+16	62	Champions League play-off round (Note: The winner of the 2017 Emperor's Cup qualified for the group stage of the 2018 AFC Champions League. Since the Emperor's Cup winner Cerezo Osaka had already qualified for the AFC Champions League, the play-off round spot was awarded to the fourth-placed team.)
5	Yokohama F. Marinos	34	17	8	9	45	36	+9	59	
6	Júbilo Iwata	34	16	10	8	50	30	+20	58	
7	Urawa Red Diamonds	34	14	7	13	64	54	+10	49	
8	Sagan Tosu	34	13	8	13	41	44	−3	47	
9	Vissel Kobe	34	13	5	16	40	45	−5	44	
10	Gamba Osaka	34	11	10	13	48	41	+7	43	
11	Consadole Sapporo	34	12	7	15	39	47	−8	43	
12	Vegalta Sendai	34	11	8	15	44	53	−9	41	
13	FC Tokyo	34	10	10	14	37	42	−5	40	
14	Shimizu S-Pulse	34	8	10	16	36	54	−18	34	
15	Sanfrecce Hiroshima	34	8	9	17	32	49	−17	33	
16	Ventforet Kofu (R)	34	7	11	16	23	39	−16	32	Relegation to 2018 J2 League
17	Albirex Niigata (R)	34	7	7	20	28	60	−32	28	Relegation to 2018 J2 League
18	Omiya Ardija (R)	34	5	10	19	28	60	−32	25	Relegation to 2018 J2 League

Source: Meiji Yasuda J1 League
Rules for classification: 1) Points; 2) Goal difference; 3) Goals scored
(C) Champions; (R) Relegated

=== Positions by round ===
Team ╲ Round	1	2	3	4	5	6	7	8	9	10	11	12	13	14	15	16	17	18	19	20	21	22	23	24	25	26	27	28	29	30	31	32	33	34
Kawasaki Frontale	2	6	3	8	6	5	6	7	9	6	7	5	5	9	6	6	6	3	4	5	4	4	3	3	2	2	2	2	2	2	2	2	2	1
Kashima Antlers	14	9	7	3	2	3	2	4	3	1	4	6	7	5	4	3	3	2	2	2	1	1	1	1	1	1	1	1	1	1	1	1	1	2
Cerezo Osaka	11	16	13	10	8	6	7	8	5	7	6	4	3	2	2	2	1	1	1	1	2	2	2	5	4	4	4	5	5	4	3	3	3	3
Kashiwa Reysol	1	8	12	15	12	15	11	10	6	5	3	2	1	1	1	1	2	4	5	3	5	5	4	4	3	3	3	3	3	5	4	4	4	4
Yokohama F. Marinos	3	1	5	7	9	8	4	9	10	11	9	9	8	7	5	5	5	5	7	4	3	3	5	2	5	5	5	4	4	3	5	5	6	5
Júbilo Iwata	11	14	10	11	10	13	10	6	8	9	10	10	12	11	10	7	7	7	6	7	7	6	6	6	6	6	6	6	6	6	6	6	5	6
Urawa Red Diamonds	13	7	4	6	4	2	1	1	1	2	1	3	4	6	8	9	8	8	8	8	8	8	7	8	8	8	7	7	7	7	7	7	7	7
Sagan Tosu	17	15	11	12	14	11	13	11	13	10	11	11	10	12	12	10	10	11	10	9	9	10	9	9	9	9	9	8	9	8	9	8	8	8
Vissel Kobe	4	3	1	1	1	1	3	3	7	8	8	8	8	8	9	11	11	9	9	10	11	11	11	11	11	11	10	10	8	10	8	9	9	9
Gamba Osaka	7	5	2	5	3	4	5	2	2	3	2	1	2	3	3	4	4	6	3	6	6	7	8	7	7	7	8	9	10	9	10	10	10	10
Consadole Sapporo	14	17	17	13	15	14	15	15	15	15	15	15	15	15	15	16	15	15	14	15	15	15	15	14	14	14	14	14	13	13	13	13	12	11
Vegalta Sendai	4	4	9	4	7	10	12	13	11	13	14	13	11	10	11	12	12	13	13	13	13	12	12	12	12	12	12	12	12	12	12	11	11	12
FC Tokyo	4	2	8	2	5	7	8	5	4	4	5	7	6	4	7	8	9	10	11	11	10	9	10	10	10	10	11	11	11	11	11	12	13	13
Shimizu S-Pulse	14	9	6	9	13	9	9	11	14	14	12	12	13	13	13	13	13	12	12	12	12	13	13	13	13	13	13	13	14	14	14	14	15	14
Sanfrecce Hiroshima	7	12	14	17	17	16	17	16	16	16	17	16	16	16	17	17	17	17	17	17	17	17	17	17	16	15	15	15	16	16	16	15	14	15
Ventforet Kofu	7	12	16	13	11	12	14	14	12	12	13	14	14	14	14	14	14	14	15	14	14	14	14	15	15	16	16	16	15	15	15	16	16	16
Albirex Niigata	7	11	15	16	16	17	16	17	17	17	18	17	17	18	18	18	18	18	18	18	18	18	18	18	18	18	18	18	18	18	18	18	18	17
Omiya Ardija	18	17	18	18	18	18	18	18	18	18	16	18	18	17	16	15	16	16	16	16	16	16	16	16	17	17	17	17	17	17	17	17	17	18

Leader and Qualification to 2018 AFC Champions League group stage
Qualification to 2018 AFC Champions League group stage
Qualification to 2018 AFC Champions League qualifying play-off
Relegation to 2018 J2 League

Source: Meiji Yasuda J1 League

=== Results table ===
Home \ Away	ALB	ANT	ARD	CER	CON	FMA	FRO	GAM	JUB	RED	REY	SAG	SFR	SSP	TOK	VEG	VEN	VIS
Albirex Niigata	—	2–4	1–2	1–0	1–0	0–2	0–2	2–3	0–2	1–6	0–1	1–0	0–0	0–2	0–3	1–2	1–0	0–2
Kashima Antlers	2–0	—	1–0	0–1	3–0	1–0	0–3	2–1	0–3	1–0	0–0	2–1	2–0	2–0	0–1	2–0	3–0	1–2
Omiya Ardija	1–0	0–1	—	0–3	2–2	1–2	0–2	2–2	1–2	1–0	1–1	1–1	1–1	0–0	1–2	2–1	0–0	0–2
Cerezo Osaka	4–0	0–1	2–1	—	3–1	2–0	2–0	2–2	0–0	4–2	2–1	1–0	5–2	1–1	3–1	1–4	2–0	3–1
Consadole Sapporo	2–2	1–2	1–0	1–1	—	0–2	1–1	0–2	2–1	2–0	3–0	3–2	2–1	1–0	2–1	1–0	1–1	1–2
Yokohama F. Marinos	1–1	3–2	1–1	1–4	3–0	—	2–0	0–1	2–1	3–2	1–1	1–0	1–1	2–2	1–0	1–1	1–0	2–0
Kawasaki Frontale	3–0	3–1	5–0	5–1	2–1	3–0	—	1–0	2–5	4–1	2–1	1–1	1–0	2–2	1–1	3–2	1–1	5–0
Gamba Osaka	0–1	0–1	6–0	3–1	0–1	1–2	1–1	—	0–2	1–1	0–1	3–0	0–1	1–1	3–0	1–1	1–1	1–2
Júbilo Iwata	2–2	0–0	2–1	1–1	2–2	2–1	0–2	3–0	—	1–1	0–2	2–1	2–3	3–1	2–0	0–1	1–0	2–1
Urawa Red Diamonds	2–1	0–1	2–2	3–1	3–2	0–1	0–1	3–3	2–4	—	1–2	2–2	4–3	3–3	2–1	7–0	4–1	1–1
Kashiwa Reysol	1–1	2–3	4–2	1–0	2–1	2–0	2–2	1–3	1–0	1–0	—	0–0	1–0	0–2	4–1	0–1	0–1	3–1
Sagan Tosu	3–0	1–0	3–0	1–2	1–0	1–0	2–3	1–3	0–2	2–1	1–3	—	1–0	2–1	2–1	1–1	2–1	1–0
Sanfrecce Hiroshima	1–1	1–3	0–3	1–0	1–1	0–1	0–3	2–2	0–0	0–1	0–2	0–1	—	0–1	2–1	3–3	1–0	1–1
Shimizu S-Pulse	2–3	2–3	1–1	3–2	0–2	1–3	0–3	2–0	0–3	1–2	1–4	1–1	1–3	—	0–2	0–3	1–0	0–1
FC Tokyo	1–1	2–2	2–0	1–4	1–2	0–1	3–0	0–0	0–0	0–1	1–2	3–3	1–0	0–0	—	1–0	1–1	1–0
Vegalta Sendai	2–1	1–4	3–0	2–4	1–0	2–2	0–2	2–3	0–0	2–3	1–1	4–1	1–0	0–0	0–2	—	3–0	0–2
Ventforet Kofu	0–2	0–1	1–0	1–1	2–0	3–2	2–2	1–0	0–0	0–1	0–0	0–0	1–2	0–1	1–1	1–0	—	2–3
Vissel Kobe	2–1	1–2	3–1	1–2	2–0	0–0	0–0	0–1	1–0	1–3	1–2	1–2	1–2	1–3	1–1	3–0	0–1	—

Updated to match(es) played on 2 December 2017. Source: Meiji Yasuda J1 League
Legend: Blue = home team win; Yellow = draw; Red = away team win.

== Season statistics ==
=== Top scorers ===
As of matches played on December 2nd, 2017.

Rank	Player	Club	Goals
1	(Japan) Yu Kobayashi	Kawasaki Frontale	23
2	(Japan) Kenyu Sugimoto	Cerezo Osaka	22
3	(Japan) Shinzo Koroki	Urawa Red Diamonds	20
4	(Japan) Kengo Kawamata	Júbilo Iwata	14
5	(Brazil) Cristiano	Kashiwa Reysol	12
5	(Brazil) Rafael Silva	Urawa Red Diamonds	12
5	(Japan) Mu Kanazaki	Kashima Antlers	12
8	(Brazil) Leandro	Kashima Antlers	11

=== Top assists ===
As of matches played on December 2nd, 2017.

Rank	Player	Club	Assists
1	(Japan) Kengo Nakamura	Kawasaki Frontale	12
2	(Brazil) Cristiano	Kashiwa Reysol	10
2	(Japan) Yusuke Maruhashi	Cerezo Osaka	10
4	(Japan) Kosuke Ota	FC Tokyo	9
4	(Japan) Kota Mizunuma	Cerezo Osaka	9
4	(Japan) Shintaro Kurumaya	Kawasaki Frontale	9
4	(Japan) Yōsuke Kashiwagi	Urawa Red Diamonds	9
8	(Japan) Manabu Saitō	Yokohama F. Marinos	8
8	(Japan) Shunsuke Nakamura	Júbilo Iwata	8
8	(Japan) Yu Kobayashi	Kawasaki Frontale	8

=== Hat-tricks ===
Player	For	Against	Result	Date
(Japan) Shinzo Koroki	Urawa Red Diamonds	Vegalta Sendai	7–0 (H)	7 April 2017
(Japan) Shinzo Koroki	Urawa Red Diamonds	Shimizu S-Pulse	3–3 (H)	20 May 2017
(Brazil) Leandro	Kashima Antlers	Albirex Niigata	4–2 (A)	16 September 2017
(Japan) Yu Kobayashi	Kawasaki Frontale	Omiya Ardija	5–0 (H)	2 December 2017

Note

(H) – Home; (A) – Away

== Attendances ==
Pos	Team	Total	High	Low	Average	Change
1	Urawa Red Diamonds	570,215	57,447	21,603	33,542	−9.2%
2	FC Tokyo	450,331	42,979	13,417	26,490	+10.2%
3	Gamba Osaka	412,710	36,177	13,074	24,277	−4.2%
4	Yokohama F. Marinos	386,875	42,483	11,036	24,180	+0.7%
5	Kawasaki Frontale	375,910	25,904	17,358	22,112	−0.1%
6	Albirex Niigata	374,585	31,014	16,461	22,034	+4.0%
7	Cerezo Osaka	356,491	42,438	8,998	20,970	+67.6%^{†}
8	Kashima Antlers	347,942	36,080	10,838	20,467	+7.1%
9	Consadole Sapporo	313,100	33,353	9,535	18,418	+26.5%^{†}
10	Vissel Kobe	310,625	25,278	7,911	18,272	+7.4%
11	Júbilo Iwata	277,450	40,491	11,762	16,321	+11.7%
12	Shimizu S-Pulse	256,965	18,556	11,007	15,116	+34.1%^{†}
13	Vegalta Sendai	250,677	18,059	11,500	14,746	−4.7%
14	Sagan Tosu	241,295	21,245	7,381	14,194	+12.3%
15	Sanfrecce Hiroshima	238,720	22,333	8,319	14,042	−9.2%
16	Kashiwa Reysol	200,936	14,096	9,432	11,820	+10.2%
17	Omiya Ardija	194,887	13,364	9,598	11,464	−3.0%
18	Ventforet Kofu	184,311	14,680	4,692	10,842	+0.1%
	League total	5,778,178	57,447	4,692	18,883	+5.1%

Updated to games played on 2017年12月2日
Source: J. League Data
Notes:
^{†} Promoted from J2.

== Awards ==
Award	Winner	Club
Manager of the Year	(Japan) Toru Oniki	Kawasaki Frontale
Most Valuable Player	(Japan) Yu Kobayashi	Kawasaki Frontale
Rookie of the Year	(Japan) Yuta Nakayama	Kashiwa Reysol
Top Scorer	(Japan) Yu Kobayashi	Kawasaki Frontale

J.League Best XI
Goalkeeper	(Japan) Kosuke Nakamura (Kashiwa Reysol)			
Defence	(Japan) Daigo Nishi (Kashima Antlers)	(Japan) Gen Shoji (Kashima Antlers)	(Brazil) Elsinho (Kawasaki Frontale)	(Japan) Shintaro Kurumaya (Kawasaki Frontale)
Midfield	(Japan) Kengo Nakamura (Kawasaki Frontale)		(Japan) Yosuke Ideguchi (Gamba Osaka)	(Japan) Hotaru Yamaguchi (Cerezo Osaka)
Attack	(Japan) Shinzo Koroki (Urawa Red Diamonds)		(Japan) Yu Kobayashi (Kawasaki Frontale)	(Japan) Kenyu Sugimoto (Cerezo Osaka)

2017 J1 League Best XI
