= Yosuke Ideguchi =

Japanese footballer (born 1996)

Yosuke Ideguchi 井手口 陽介
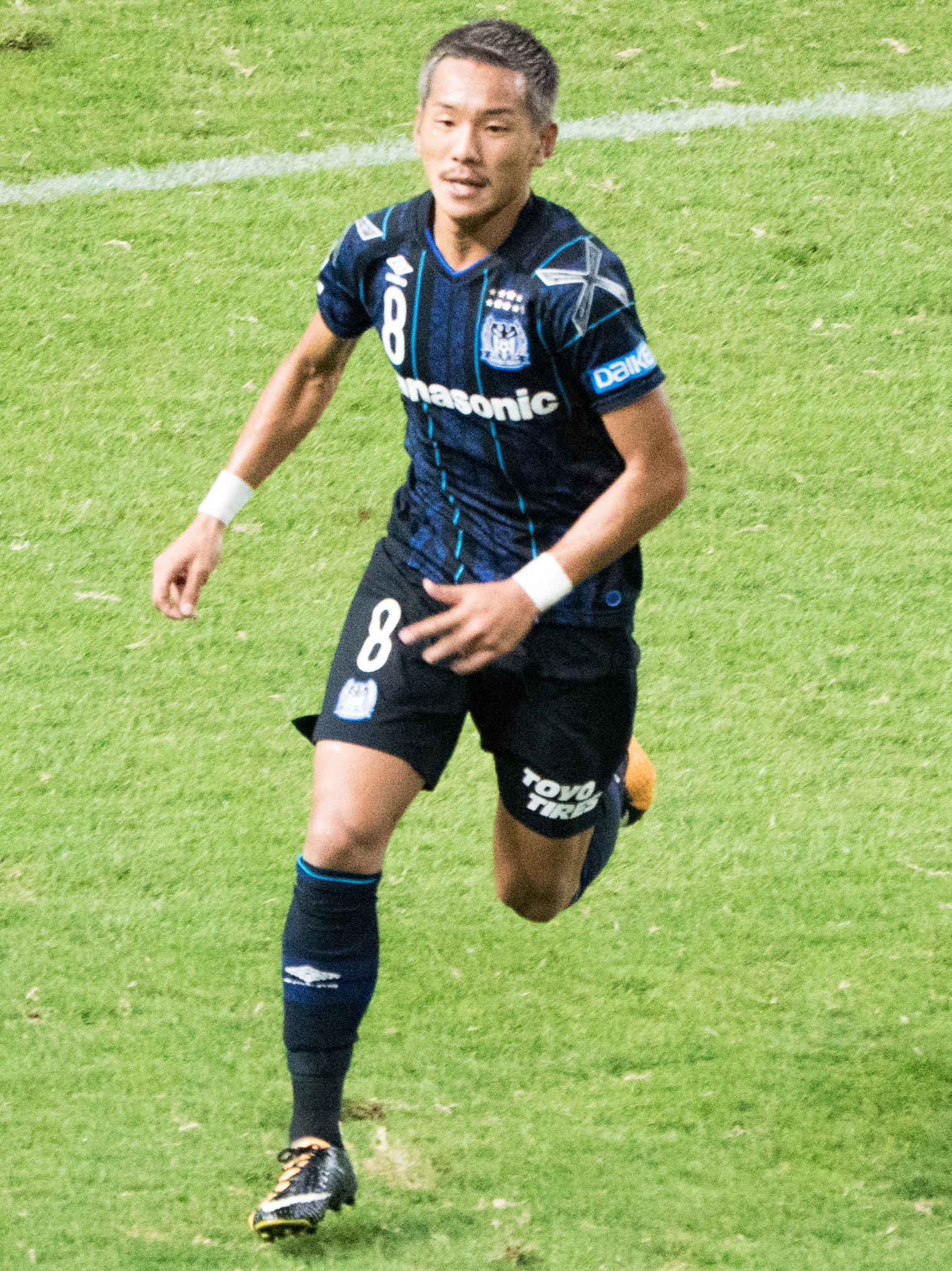
- Ideguchi playing for Gamba Osaka in 2017

Personal information
- Full name: Yosuke Ideguchi
- Date of birth: 23 August 1996 (age 30)
- Place of birth: Fukuoka, Japan
- Height: 1.71 m (5 ft 7 in)
- Position: Central midfielder

Team information
- Current team: Vissel Kobe
- Number: 7

Youth career
- 2006: Chuo FC
- 2007: Street FC
- 2008: Aburayama Camellia
- 2009–2013: Gamba Osaka

Senior career*
Years	Team	Apps	(Gls)
2014–2017	Gamba Osaka	60	(8)
2014–2015	→ J.League U22 (loan)	11	(1)
2018–2019	Leeds United	0	(0)
2018	→ Cultural Leonesa (loan)	5	(0)
2018–2019	→ Greuther Fürth (loan)	7	(1)
2019	→ Greuther Fürth II (loan)	1	(0)
2019–2022	Gamba Osaka	67	(6)
2022–2024	Celtic	3	(0)
2023–2024	→ Avispa Fukuoka (loan)	21	(0)
2024–	Vissel Kobe	78	(2)

International career^{‡}
2014	Japan U19	4	(1)
2016	Japan U23	4	(1)
2017–	Japan	15	(2)
Medal record
Representing Japan
AFC U-23 Championship
Gold medal – first place	2016
- * Club domestic league appearances and goals as of 10 August 2026 ‡ National team caps and goals as of 18 December 2019

Yosuke Ideguchi (井手口 陽介, Ideguchi Yōsuke; born 23 August 1996) is a Japanese professional footballer who plays as a central midfielder for J1 League club Vissel Kobe, and for the Japan national team. He previously represented Japan at both Under-19 and Under-23 levels.

== Club career ==
=== Gamba Osaka ===
His first three years on his youth football career was unusually played in three different clubs. He played on Chuo FC, Street FC and Aburayama Camellia between 2006 and 2008. He joined the Gamba Osaka academy in 2009. He made his first team debut with Gamba Osaka in 2014, he joined J.League U22's on loan in 2014 to get first team experience.

During the 2016 JLeague season Ideguchi was named 'New Hero Award' and the prestigious 'Rookie of the Year' award for the JLeague. After almost ten years spent with Gamba Osaka between youth ranks and senior team he left the club after 60 appearances in the JLeague scoring 8 goals.

=== Leeds United ===
On 9 January 2018, Ideguchi joined Championship side Leeds United on a four-and-a-half-year deal for an undisclosed fee.

==== Cultural Leonesa loan ====
The same day after signing for Leeds, he went on a half a season loan to Leeds's feeder team in Spain, Aspire Academy owned club Cultural Leonesa with the club wanting to ready Ideguchi for European style football. On 28 January 2018, Ideguchi made his debut for Cultural Leonesa against CA Osasuna in a 2–1 defeat.

==== Return to Leeds ====
After returning for the start of pre-season under new Leeds head coach Marcelo Bielsa, Despite starting for Leeds in three of their pre-season friendlies, on 26 July 2018, Ideguchi was seemingly not given a shirt number for Leeds for the upcoming 2018–19 season for Leeds. However, the following day 27 July, he was listed with shirt number 16 shirt in the club's online store. By early August, Bielsa praised Ideguchi's professionalism and hard work since his joining Leeds United, but admitted he did not see him as first or second choice for any position, and indicated he did not think it would be fair to ask him to stay at the club.

==== Greuther Fürth loan ====
On 21 August 2018, Ideguchi joined 2. Bundesliga side Greuther Fürth on a season-long loan deal with an option to make the deal permanent. On 15 September, he scored on his Greuther Fürth debut in the 4–1 win against Holstein Kiel. On 30 September, he was substituted in a 1–0 win over Dynamo Dresden with what later was revealed to be a posterior cruciate ligament injury, expected to keep him out for most of the season.

Having spent the initial part of his rehabilitation in Japan, Ideguchi returned to Germany at the start of 2019. On 6 May 2019, he made his first competitive appearance after the injury, coming on as a substitute as Greuther Fürth lost 4–0 at home to 1. FC Köln.

In total, he made seven appearances, scoring one goal for Greuther Fürth in 2. Bundesliga, with Ideguchi missing the majority of the season due to his posterior cruciate ligament injury.

=== Gamba Osaka ===
On 5 August 2019, he rejoined Gamba Osaka.

=== Celtic ===
On 31 December 2021, Ideguchi was announced to have signed for Scottish Premiership club Celtic for an undisclosed fee.

On 17 January 2022, Ideguchi made his debut for the club in a 2–0 win against Hibernian in the Scottish Premiership. A few days later, Ideguchi would start in a Scottish Cup fourth round tie against Scottish League One side Alloa Athletic. While Celtic won 2–1 and progressed to the next round, he sustained a serious injury and was forced off late in the game due to a strong challenge from Mouhamed Niang.

=== Vissel Kobe ===
On 9 January 2024, he joined Vissel Kobe.

== International career ==
=== Japan under-23's ===
After featuring for Japan U19, in 2016, Ideguchi was promoted to Japan U23's and was part of the Japan U23's that won the AFC U-23 Championship on 31 January 2016, he played in the final for Japan U23's in a 3–2 victory against South Korea U23.

=== Japan senior team ===
Ideguchi got his first call up to the senior Japan squad for matches against Oman and Saudi Arabia in November 2016. On 31 August 2017, he scored the second goal when Japan beat Australia 2–0 and qualified for the 2018 World Cup in the process. On 9 December 2017, Ideguchi scored the winner for Japan in a 1–0 victory against North Korea in the 2017 EAFF E-1 Football Championship.

On 15 March 2018, Vahid Halilhodzic surprisingly left out Ideguchi and Takuma Asano for the Japan squad for friendly matches with Mali and Ukraine in preparation for the 2018 FIFA World Cup, with Halilhodzic describing Ideguchi's lack of regular game time at Cultural Leonesa he proclaimed 'It makes me sad that Asano and Ideguchi are not playing, They were the heroes of our qualifying game against Australia. They haven't been chosen this time, and if things continue the way they are, there is a chance that they won't be chosen for the World Cup."

On 17 May 2018, Ideguchi was named in new Japan Manager's Akira Nishino's preliminary 35 man squad for Japan for the 2018 FIFA World Cup in Russia. Japan's squad was cut from 35 to 26, Ideguchi was named in the 26, and played for Japan on 31 May in a 2–0 defeat to Ghana in a pre-2018 FIFA World Cup friendly, the following day, the squad was cut from 26 to the final 23 man squad with Ideguchi missing out.

== Career statistics ==
=== Club ===
As of 14 May 2022

Appearances and goals by club, season and competition
Club	Season	League			National cup		League cup		Continental		Other (Note: Appearances in J. League Championship, Japanese Super Cup and Suruga Bank Championship)		Total	
Club	Season	Division	Apps	Goals	Apps	Goals	Apps	Goals	Apps	Goals	Apps	Goals	Apps	Goals
Gamba Osaka	2014	J1 League	0	0	0	0	2	0	–		–		2	0
Gamba Osaka	2015	J1 League	8	0	4	0	4	0	1	0	3	0	20	0
Gamba Osaka	2016	J1 League	22	4	1	0	5	0	5	0	1	0	34	4
Gamba Osaka	2017	J1 League	30	4	3	1	0	0	6	0	–		39	5
Gamba Osaka	Total		60	8	8	1	11	0	12	0	4	0	95	9
J.League U-22 Selection	2014	J3 League	3	0	–		–		–		–		3	0
J.League U-22 Selection	2015	J3 League	8	1	–		–		–		–		8	1
J.League U-22 Selection	Total		11	1	0	0	0	0	0	0	0	0	11	1
Leeds United	2017–18	Championship	0	0	0	0	0	0	0	0	0	0	0	0
Leeds United	2018–19	Championship	0	0	0	0	0	0	0	0	0	0	0	0
Leeds United	Total		0	0	0	0	0	0	0	0	0	0	0	0
Cultural Leonesa (loan)	2017–18	Segunda División	5	0	0	0	0	0	0	0	0	0	5	0
Greuther Fürth (loan)	2018–19	2. Bundesliga	7	1	0	0	0	0	0	0	0	0	7	1
Gamba Osaka	2019	J1 League	12	2	1	0	4	0	0	0	0	0	17	2
Gamba Osaka	2020	J1 League	26	4	0	0	2	0	0	0	0	0	28	4
Gamba Osaka	2021	J1 League	29	0	3	1	2	0	6	0	0	0	40	1
Gamba Osaka	Total		67	6	4	1	8	0	6	0	0	0	85	7
Celtic	2021–22	Scottish Premiership	3	0	3	0	0	0	0	0	0	0	6	0
Celtic	2022–23	Scottish Premiership	0	0	0	0	0	0	0	0	0	0	0	0
Celtic	Total		3	0	3	0	0	0	0	0	0	0	6	0
Career total			153	16	15	2	19	0	18	0	4	0	209	18

=== International ===
As of

Appearances and goals by national team and year
National team	Year	Apps	Goals
Japan	2017	11	2
Japan	2018	1	0
Japan	2019	3	0
Total		15	2

Scores and results list Japan's goal tally first, score column indicates score after each Ideguchi goal.

List of international goals scored by Yosuke Ideguchi
No.	Date	Venue	Opponent	Score	Result	Competition
1	31 August 2017	Saitama Stadium 2002, Saitama, Japan	Australia	2–0	2–0	2018 FIFA World Cup qualification
2	9 December 2017	Ajinomoto Stadium, Tokyo, Japan	North Korea	1–0	1–0	2017 EAFF E-1 Football Championship

== Honours ==
Gamba Osaka

- J. League Division 1: 2014
- Emperor's Cup: 2014, 2015
- J.League Cup: 2014
- Japanese Super Cup: 2015

Celtic

- Scottish Premiership: 2021–22

Avispa Fukuoka

- J.League Cup: 2023

Vissel Kobe

- J1 League: 2024
- Emperor's Cup: 2024
- J1 100 Year Vision League: 2026

Japan U-23

- AFC U-23 Championship: 2016

Japan

- EAFF E-1 Football Championship: runners-up 2017

Individual

- J.League Cup New Hero Award: 2016
- J.League Rookie of the Year: 2016
- J.League Best XI: 2017
- J1 100 Year Vision League Regional Round West Best Eleven: 2026
