= Hugo García (Spanish footballer) =

Spanish footballer

Personal information
- Full name: Hugo García Jiménez
- Date of birth: 8 September 2005 (age 21)
- Place of birth: Cintruénigo, Spain
- Height: 1.75 m (5 ft 9 in)
- Position: Winger

Team information
- Current team: Cultural Leonesa (on loan from Eibar)

Youth career
- Osasuna
- 2022–2024: Eibar

Senior career*
Years	Team	Apps	(Gls)
2024	Eibar Urko	12	(3)
2024–2026	Eibar B	37	(6)
2025–	Eibar	3	(0)
2026–	→ Cultural Leonesa (loan)	0	(0)
- * Club domestic league appearances and goals as of 14 May 2026

Hugo García Jiménez (born 8 September 2005) is a Spanish professional footballer who plays as a winger for Cultural y Deportiva Leonesa, on loan from SD Eibar.

== Club career ==
Born in Cintruénigo, Navarre, García joined SD Eibar's youth sides in 2022, from CA Osasuna. He made his senior debut with the C-team SD Eibar Urko in the regional leagues, before establishing himself as a regular starter with the reserves in Segunda Federación.

On 25 March 2025, García renewed his contract with the Armeros until 2027. He made his first team debut on 29 October, coming on as a second-half substitute for Malcom Adu Ares in a 4–2 away win over Náxara CD, for the season's Copa del Rey.

García made his professional debut on 1 November 2025, replacing Álvaro Rodríguez late into a 3–1 Segunda División loss at UD Almería. The following 15 August, he was loaned to Primera Federación side Cultural y Deportiva Leonesa for the season.
