= Alejandro Morante =

Spanish footballer (born 2006)

Personal information
- Full name: Alejandro Morante Simón
- Date of birth: 26 April 2006 (age 20)
- Place of birth: Santander, Spain
- Height: 1.73 m (5 ft 8 in)
- Position: Winger

Team information
- Current team: Júpiter Leonés
- Number: 29

Youth career
- 2012–2019: Bezana
- 2019–2025: Racing Santander

Senior career*
Years	Team	Apps	(Gls)
2025–	Júpiter Leonés	17	(4)
2026–	Cultural Leonesa	1	(0)
- * Club domestic league appearances and goals as of 17 May 2026

Alejandro Morante Simón (born 26 April 2006) is a Spanish professional footballer who plays mainly as a right winger for Júpiter Leonés.

== Career ==
Born in Santander, Cantabria, Morante represented CD Bezana and Racing de Santander as a youth. In July 2025, after leaving the latter side, he moved to Cultural y Deportiva Leonesa and was initially assigned to farm team Júpiter Leonés in Tercera Federación.

Morante made his senior debut with Júpiter on 6 September 2025, in a 1–0 home loss to CD La Virgen del Camino, and scored his first goal in a 2–1 home win over CD Becerril late in that month. He made his debut with the main squad on 16 May 2026, coming on as a second-half substitute for Diego Collado in a 2–1 Segunda División home win over SD Eibar.
