= Bae Soo-yong =

South Korean footballer

Personal information
- Full name: Bae Soo-yong
- Date of birth: June 7, 1998 (age 28)
- Place of birth: South Korea
- Height: 1.88 m (6 ft 2 in)
- Position: Defender

Team information
- Current team: Chungnam Asan FC
- Number: 30

Senior career*
Years	Team	Apps	(Gls)
2017	Gamba Osaka U-23	24	(1)
2017–	Gamba Osaka	0	(0)
2018	→Giravanz Kitakyushu (loan)	4	(0)
2019	→Kamatamare Sanuki (loan)	18	(2)
2020–	Chungnam Asan FC	29	(0)
Total		28	(1)
- * Club domestic league appearances and goals as of 11 October 2022

Bae Soo-yong (Korean: 배수용; born June 7, 1998) is a South Korean football player. He plays as a defender for Chungnam Asan FC in K2 League.

== Career ==
Bae Soo-yong joined J1 League club Gamba Osaka in 2017. He was loaned out to J3 side Giravanz Kitakyushu ahead of the 2018 J2 League season.

== Career statistics ==
Last update: 2 December 2018

Club performance			League		Cup		League Cup		Continental		Other		Total	
Season	Club	League	Apps	Goals	Apps	Goals	Apps	Goals	Apps	Goals	Apps	Goals	Apps	Goals
Japan			League		Emperor's Cup		League Cup		Asia				Total	
2017	Gamba Osaka	J1	0	0	0	0	0	0	0	0	-		0	0
Total			0	0	0	0	0	0	0	0	-		0	0
2018	Giravanz Kitakyushu	J2	4	0	0	0	-		-		-		4	0
Total			4	0	0	0	-		-		-		4	0
Career total			4	0	0	0	0	0	0	0	-		4	0

Reserves performance

Last Updated: 9 December 2017

Club performance			League		Total	
Season	Club	League	Apps	Goals	Apps	Goals
Japan			League		Total	
2017	Gamba Osaka U-23	J3	24	1	24	1
Career total			24	1	24	1
