= Kim Jung-ya =

Japanese footballer (born 1988)

Kim Jung-ya 김정야
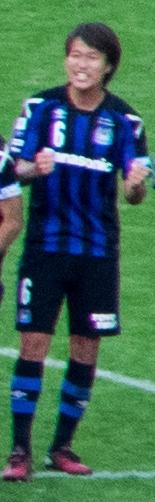

Personal information
- Full name: Kim Jung-Ya
- Date of birth: May 17, 1988 (age 38)
- Place of birth: Kobe, Hyōgo, Japan
- Height: 1.83 m (6 ft 0 in)
- Position: Defender

Team information
- Current team: Fujieda MYFC
- Number: 32

Youth career
- 2001−2003: FC Fresca Tel Zur
- 2004−2006: Kobe S&T High School
- 2007−2010: Komazawa University

Senior career*
| Years | Team | Apps | (Gls) |
| 2011–2017 | Gamba Osaka | 70 | (4) |
| 2013 | → Sagan Tosu (loan) | 8 | (0) |
| 2016−2017 | → Gamba Osaka U-23 (loan) | 2 | (0) |
| 2018−2020 | Vegalta Sendai | 41 | (0) |
| 2021– | Fujieda MYFC | 0 | (0) |
- * Club domestic league appearances and goals as of 16 December 2018

Kim Jung-ya (Korean: 김정야; born May 17, 1988) is a Japanese football player who plays for Fujieda MYFC.

== Club statistics ==
Last update: 18 February 2019.

| Club performance | | | League^{1} | | Cup | | League Cup | | Continental | | Other | | Total | |
| Season | Club | League | Apps | Goals | Apps | Goals | Apps | Goals | Apps | Goals | Apps | Goals | Apps | Goals |
| Japan | | | League | | Emperor's Cup | | League Cup | | Asia | | Other^{2} | | Total | |
|---|---|---|---|---|---|---|---|---|---|---|---|---|---|---|
| 2011 | Gamba Osaka | J1 League | 3 | 0 | 1 | 0 | 1 | 0 | 3 | 0 | - | | 8 | 0 |
| 2012 | Gamba Osaka | J1 League | 7 | 0 | 1 | 0 | 2 | 0 | 0 | 0 | - | | 10 | 0 |
| 2013 | Sagan Tosu | J1 League | 8 | 0 | 1 | 0 | 4 | 0 | - | | - | | 13 | 0 |
| 2014 | Gamba Osaka | J1 League | 4 | 0 | 5 | 0 | 4 | 0 | - | | - | | 13 | 0 |
| 2015 | Gamba Osaka | J1 League | 13 | 0 | 3 | 0 | 3 | 0 | 7 | 0 | 1 | 0 | 27 | 0 |
| 2016 | Gamba Osaka | J1 League | 28 | 3 | 1 | 0 | 5 | 0 | 5 | 0 | 0 | 0 | 39 | 3 |
| 2017 | Gamba Osaka | J1 League | 15 | 1 | 3 | 0 | 2 | 0 | 3 | 0 | - | | 23 | 1 |
| 2018 | Vegalta Sendai | J1 League | 13 | 0 | 1 | 0 | 3 | 0 | - | | - | | 17 | 0 |
| Career total | | | 91 | 4 | 16 | 0 | 24 | 0 | 18 | 0 | 1 | 0 | 151 | 4 |

^{1} includes J. League Championship appearances and ^{2} = Japanese Super Cup and Suruga Bank Championship appearances.

Reserves performance

| Club performance | | | League | | Total | |
| Season | Club | League | Apps | Goals | Apps | Goals |
| Japan | | | League | | Total | |
|---|---|---|---|---|---|---|
| 2016 | Gamba Osaka U-23 | J3 | 1 | 0 | 1 | 0 |
| 2017 | Gamba Osaka U-23 | J3 | 1 | 0 | 1 | 0 |
| Career total | | | 2 | 0 | 2 | 0 |

== Honors ==
Gamba Osaka

- J1 League - 2014
- Emperor's Cup - 2014, 2015
- J. League Cup - 2014
- Japanese Super Cup - 2015
