= Gabriel Rodrigues =

Brazilian footballer (born 1996)

Personal information
- Full name: Gabriel Rodrigues da Silva
- Date of birth: February 15, 1996 (age 30)
- Place of birth: Brazil
- Height: 1.93 m (6 ft 4 in)
- Position: Forward

Team information
- Current team: Louletano
- Number: 51

Senior career*
Years	Team	Apps	(Gls)
2016	Guarani	0	(0)
2016–2018	São Paulo	0	(0)
2017	→ Ventforet Kofu (loan)	1	(0)
2018	→ Caxias (loan)	0	(0)
2019	Aves B		
2019	Indy Eleven	6	(0)
2020–	Louletano	1	(0)
- * Club domestic league appearances and goals as of 21:21, 29 March 2020 (UTC)

Gabriel Rodrigues da Silva (born February 15, 1996) is a Brazilian professional footballer who plays as a forward for Portuguese club Louletano.

== Career ==
At the end of January 2019, it was announced that Rodrigues had joined the reserve team / U-23 squad of C.D. Aves. On 12 August 2019, he joined USL Championship side Indy Eleven.

In January 2020, he moved back to Portugal and joined Louletano.
