= Júpiter Leonés =

Association football club in Spain

- Full name: Cultural y Deportiva Leonesa, S.A.D. "B" Júpiter Leonés
- Founded: 1929 (re-founded in 2014)
- Ground: Área Deportiva de Puente Castro, León, Spain
- Capacity: 5,000
- Owner: Aspire Academy
- Chairman: Mohd Khalifa M. F. Al-Suwaidi
- Head coach: José Antonio Portillo
- League: Tercera Federación – Group 8
- 2025–26: Tercera Federación – Group 8, 11th of 18
Home colours	Away colours

Cultural y Deportiva Leonesa "B" Júpiter Leonés, also known as Júpiter Leonés, is a Spanish football team based in León, in the autonomous community of Castile and León. Founded in 1929 and re-founded in 2014, they are the reserve team of Cultural y Deportiva Leonesa, and play in the Tercera Federación – Group 8.

== History ==
=== Origins ===
Cultural y Deportiva Leonesa B was born from the team Jupiter Leonés, founded in 1929 and originally wearing a red or claret t-shirt and black pants. Between 1929 and 1936, Júpiter was not registered in the Regional Federation and only played friendly matches. It did not have its own stadium, so it played in different pitches depending on its availability.

With the disappearance of Cultural Leonesa, in the years of the Spanish Second Republic and the difficulties during the Spanish Civil War, Júpiter became the first team in the city of León, over the other main team of the city in the 1930s, the Deportivo Leonés. During this period, the club won 98 of the 117 games that it played, scoring 498 goals.

=== First contacts with the Cultural ===
Júpiter registered in the Federation for the first time in 1952 and it started playing official matches in the second provincial league. As the club was achieving great success, President Antonio Amilivia began the first contacts to merge Júpiter and Deportivo. In 1954 the presidents of both teams, Antonio Amilivia and Demetrio Villalón (who in the 1960s would be president of Cultural Leonesa) signed the first agreement of affiliation. Since its signature, Júpiter changed its colors to white, reaching Tercera División while Cultural Leonesa, as the main team of the city, was playing in Segunda División with a one-year presence in La Liga.

=== Separation and Golden Age ===
With the descent to Tercera de la Cultural in 1958 the agreement broke down and during the 60s they became legally different clubs, although for all the soccer people the union continued. The loan of players was constant and the fans of both clubs were the same, there was no rivalry, Jupiter was still "the little brother" and all the people in Leon understood it as well. The 1960s can be considered the "golden age" of Jupiter. The club was in the Third Division (a Third equivalent to the second B of today but harder) with a strong economy and a good policy of quarry that took advantage of the jewels that the modest clubs of the city removed from its rows. At the head of Jupiter was Agustín Álvarez "Cachús" who was always linked to the Culture but without giving up the best for his Jupiter, trying even in the middle of the decade (in the time of Operation Scrap) to convert Jupiter in the First team of the city to the detriment of the Cultural.

=== Definite union with the Cultural ===
In these 60's Cultural and Jupiter were at the same time being Next to the Ponferradina the "gallitos" of our group of Third. In 1970 with Ángel Panero to the front of the Cultural in Second Division contacts were resumed to reconvert to Jupiter in filial, condition that will have until 1974 when it happens to belong of form officially to the structure of the club, happening to call "Cultural Promesas".

During these years 60 and 70 Cultural and Jupiter were united even in the smallest details; There were card modalities to be members of both clubs, discounts, games that were played in a row, training and preseason joint and what they liked most in the hobby: it was usual for the Cultural to coincide outside the home the day that Jupiter did As local, so that both parties were put at the same time so that, while the fans saw the Jupiter, they would listen by the radio the party of the Cultural.

It is worth noting that in the 1985/86 season the Cultural and Cultural de León play in the third division. The subsidiary makes a campaign under the orders of Arlindo Cuesta. Winning the majors in the go 2-0 and tying in the return with a few steps to overflow. The lineup of Carlos, Pin, Tobi, Roberto, Paquito, Raúl, Cacharrón, Javi, Losada, Canseco and Pachi will be remembered.

=== Refounding Júpiter ===
After the season 2009–10, the reserve team was dissolved as Cultural Leonesa was relegated to Tercera División due to its financial trouble.

Cultural Leonesa B was refounded in 2014, recovering its original name "Jupiter Leonés". It started playing in Segunda Provincial, the seventh tier, and it finished its first season as champion of the league and was consequently promoted.

With the entering of the Qatari Aspire Academy in the board of Cultural Leonesa, the intention was to promote Júpiter to Tercera División immediately. In its first season managing the club, Júpiter achieved promotion to Regional Aficionados, only one tier below Tercera División, and two years later, in the season 2017–2018, Jupiter reached the goal of being promoted to Tercera División (the fourth tier in Spain's football leagues system).

== Season to season ==
Season	Tier	Division	Place	Copa del Rey
1929–1952	—	Regional	—	
1952–53	4	1ª Reg.		
1953–54	3	3ª	10th	
1954–55	3	3ª	11th	
1955–56	3	3ª	3rd	
1956–57	3	3ª	8th	
1957–58	3	3ª	9th	
1958–59	3	3ª	12th	
1959–60	3	3ª	16th	
1960–61	3	3ª	9th	
1961–62	3	3ª	16th	
1962–63	4	1ª Reg.	1st	
1963–64	3	3ª	9th	
1964–65	3	3ª	12th	
1965–66	3	3ª	12th	
1966–67	3	3ª	9th	
1967–68	3	3ª	9th	
1968–69	3	3ª	17th	
1969–70	3	3ª	18th	
1970–71	4	Reg. Pref.	2nd	

Season	Tier	Division	Place	Copa del Rey
1971–72	3	3ª	13th	
1972–73	4	Reg. Pref.	2nd	
1973–74	4	Reg. Pref.	10th	
1974–75	4	Reg. Pref.	5th	
1975–76	4	Reg. Pref.	15th	
1976–77	5	1ª Reg.	4th	
1977–78	5	Reg. Pref.	4th	
1978–79	5	Reg. Pref.	5th	
1979–80	5	Reg. Pref.	8th	
1980–81	4	3ª	13th	
1981–82	4	3ª	10th	
1982–83	5	Reg. Pref.	4th	
1983–84	5	Reg. Pref.	1st	
1984–85	5	Reg. Pref.	1st	
1985–86	4	3ª	5th	
1986–87	4	3ª	15th	
1987–88	4	3ª	10th	
1988–89	4	3ª	14th	
1989–90	4	3ª	20th	
1990–91	5	Reg. Pref.	1st	DNP

Season	Tier	Division	Place
1991–92	4	3ª	4th
1992–93	4	3ª	13th
1993–94	4	3ª	16th
1994–95	5	Reg. Pref.	3rd
1995–96	5	Reg. Pref.	2nd
1996–97	5	Reg. Pref.	2nd
1997–98	4	3ª	8th
1998–99	4	3ª	11th
1999–2000	4	3ª	6th
2000–01	4	3ª	15th
2001–02	4	3ª	14th
2002–03	4	3ª	10th
2003–04	4	3ª	8th
2004–05	4	3ª	9th
2005–06	4	3ª	8th
2006–07	4	3ª	15th
2007–08	4	3ª	13th
2008–09	4	3ª	17th
2009–10	4	3ª	20th
2010–2014	DNP		

Season	Tier	Division	Place
2014–15	7	2ª Prov.	1st
2015–16	6	1ª Prov.	1st
2016–17	5	1ª Reg.	3rd
2017–18	5	1ª Reg.	1st
2018–19	4	3ª	8th
2019–20	4	3ª	12th
2020–21	4	3ª	3rd / 6th
2021–22	5	3ª RFEF	6th
2022–23	5	3ª Fed.	13th
2023–24	5	3ª Fed.	4th
2024–25	5	3ª Fed.	7th
2025–26	5	3ª Fed.	11th
2026–27	5	3ª Fed.	

- 43 seasons in Tercera División
- 6 seasons in Tercera Federación/Tercera División RFEF

== Current squad ==
As of 6 September 2026

Note: Flags indicate national team as defined under FIFA eligibility rules; some limited exceptions apply. Players may hold more than one non-FIFA nationality.

No.	Pos.	Nation	Player
4	DF	ESP	Pablo Prada
5	DF	ESP	Lucas Martín
6	MF	DOM	Sergio Cuello
7	FW	ESP	Jesús Muñiz
9	FW	ESP	Turi Suárez
10	FW	ESP	Choco
11	FW	ESP	Alejandro Morante
12	DF	ESP	Juan Merino
13	GK	ESP	Alejandro Gil
16	MF	UKR	Danylo Bilan
17	FW	ESP	Iker García
19	FW	ESP	Álex Oviedo
20	MF	ESP	Hugo Aller

No.	Pos.	Nation	Player
21	MF	ESP	Yago San Miguel
23	FW	ESP	Álvaro Falagán
26	MF	ESP	Gael Ocón
27	MF	JPN	Genki Tanaka
28	MF	ESP	Miguel Arribas
29	MF	ESP	Mauro Fontanillo
30	GK	ESP	Lucas Eiriz
—	GK	ESP	Javi Palomares
—	DF	ESP	Víctor Pastor
—	DF	ESP	Diego Rosado
—	MF	ESP	Marcos de la Riva
—	FW	ESP	Marcos Fernández
