= Cultural y Deportiva Leonesa =

Spanish professional football club

Cultural Leonesa
- Full name: Cultural y Deportiva Leonesa
- Nicknames: La Cultu; La Leonesa
- Founded: 5 August 1923; 103 years ago
- Stadium: Estadio Reino de León
- Capacity: 13,346
- Owner: Aspire Academy
- President: Mohd Khalifa Al Suwadi
- Head coach: Fernando Estévez
- League: Primera Federación – Group 1
- 2025–26: Segunda División, 21st of 22 (relegated)
- Website: cydleonesa.com
Home colours	Away colours	Third colours

Cultural y Deportiva Leonesa (Spanish pronunciation: [kultuˈɾal i ðepoɾˈtiβa leoˈnesa]), better known as Cultural Leonesa or La Cultural, is a Spanish football team based in León, in the autonomous community of Castile and Leon. Founded on 5 August 1923, it currently plays in Primera Federación – Group 1, holding home games at Estadio Reino de León, with a capacity of 13,346 seats.

Ahead of the 2014–15 season, the club released a kit designed to look like a tuxedo. The kit, which attracted huge attention in the media and social networking sites, was worn in a pre-season charity match in support of local charities for mining families.

== History ==
Cultural Leonesa league performance 1929-present.

Cultural y Deportiva Leonesa was founded on 5 August 1923.

In 1926, Cultural Leonesa won the Regional championship and in 1929 Cultural played the Segunda División Grupo B and promoted to the second division.

In 1931, the club ceased activity and several teams were created in the city with the aim to replace them, but after the Spanish Civil War, Cultural Leonesa came back to the competition.

In 1955, Cultural was promoted for the first time to La Liga, but they could only play one season in the Spanish top tier.

In 2011, the club was relegated to Tercera División due to unpaid debts to the players and took two years to recover the place in the third tier. In 2015, the Qatari Aspire Academy bought a controlling 99% of the shares of the club, thus avoiding its dissolution.

On 28 May 2017, Cultural was promoted to Segunda División after 42 years by defeating Barcelona B in the promotion play-offs. On 3 January 2018, Leeds United announced an official partnership with Cultural Leonesa's owners Aspire Academy in Qatar. The link up saw Leeds players Yosuke Ideguchi and Ouasim Bouy both join Cultural Leonesa on loan as part of the unique partnership.

On 2 June 2018, Cultural was relegated to the third level, after being defeated by Numancia on the last matchday. In the 2018–19 season the club played in Segunda División B, Group 1 and fought to be promoted back to the second tier. But it finished only in the 5th position. The club had a good start on the 2019–20 season, being in the 2nd position after first 16 games. In the 2019–2020 season, they upset Atletico de Madrid in the Copa del Rey Round of 32.

On 2 December 2020, Cultural hired Iñigo Idiakez as Head Coach who came from Luton Town in EFL Championship and previously Leicester City and Derby County.

On 24 May 2025, Cultural achieved promoted to Segunda División following draw 1–1 against Andorra and thanks to a superior head-to-head record against runners-up Ponferradina, returned after 7 years absence.

== Honours ==
- Castilla-León Championship:
  - Winners (4): 1925–26, 1927–28, 1928–29, 1929–30
- Teide Trophy:
  - Winners (1): 2019

== Club structure ==
Position	Name
President	Mohd Khalifa Al Suwadi
Vice-President
Managing Director	Felipe Llamazares Díez
Sports management	Ricardo Pozo Álvarez
Director Delegate	Ignacio Álvarez Martínez
Advisory Board	Antonio Martín Espina; José Lasa; Jassim Mohammed AA Al-Ansari
Fundation culturalista	Manuel Carnero; Diego Calzado
Technical secretary	Santi Santos; Juan Carlos Valiño (adjunto); César Villafañe (adjunto)
Social area	Juan Luis Diez Mata

== Season to season ==
Season	Tier	Division	Place	Copa del Rey
1929	3	3ª	1st	Round of 32
1929–30	2	2ª	10th	Round of 32
1930–31	3	3ª	6th	Round of 32
1931–32	3	3ª	5th	
1932–1939	DNP			
1939–40	3	1ª Reg.	2nd	
1940–41	4	1ª Reg.	2nd	
1941–42	3	1ª Reg.	1st	
1942–43	2	2ª	3rd	
1943–44	2	2ª	9th	Round of 32
1944–45	2	2ª	13th	First round
1945–46	3	3ª	3rd	
1946–47	3	3ª	2nd	
1947–48	3	3ª	8th	Fifth round
1948–49	3	3ª	7th	Second round
1949–50	3	3ª	5th	
1950–51	3	3ª	5th	
1951–52	3	3ª	3rd	
1952–53	3	3ª	2nd	
1953–54	2	2ª	4th	

Season	Tier	Division	Place	Copa del Rey
1954–55	2	2ª	1st	Round of 16
1955–56	1	1ª	15th	Round of 16
1956–57	2	2ª	6th	
1957–58	2	2ª	16th	
1958–59	2	2ª	16th	
1959–60	3	3ª	1st	Round of 16
1960–61	2	2ª	12th	First round
1961–62	2	2ª	16th	First round
1962–63	3	3ª	4th	
1963–64	3	3ª	3rd	
1964–65	3	3ª	7th	
1965–66	3	3ª	2nd	
1966–67	3	3ª	3rd	
1967–68	3	3ª	1st	
1968–69	3	3ª	4th	
1969–70	3	3ª	2nd	Second round
1970–71	3	3ª	1st	Fourth round
1971–72	2	2ª	5th	Fifth round
1972–73	2	2ª	19th	Fourth round
1973–74	3	3ª	1st	Third round

Season	Tier	Division	Place	Copa del Rey
1974–75	2	2ª	20th	Fifth round
1975–76	3	3ª	6th	Second round
1976–77	3	3ª	2nd	First round
1977–78	3	2ª B	6th	Second round
1978–79	3	2ª B	5th	Second round
1979–80	3	2ª B	4th	Second round
1980–81	3	2ª B	4th	First round
1981–82	3	2ª B	19th	Second round
1982–83	3	2ª B	19th	
1983–84	4	3ª	2nd	
1984–85	4	3ª	2nd	First round
1985–86	4	3ª	1st	First round
1986–87	4	3ª	2nd	Third round
1987–88	3	2ª B	14th	First round
1988–89	3	2ª B	8th	First round
1989–90	3	2ª B	7th	
1990–91	3	2ª B	9th	Second round
1991–92	3	2ª B	6th	Second round
1992–93	3	2ª B	10th	Second round
1993–94	3	2ª B	17th	Third round

Season	Tier	Division	Place	Copa del Rey
1994–95	4	3ª	1st	Third round
1995–96	3	2ª B	4th	Second round
1996–97	3	2ª B	8th	First round
1997–98	3	2ª B	4th	
1998–99	3	2ª B	1st	First round
1999–2000	3	2ª B	9th	Preliminary
2000–01	3	2ª B	2nd	
2001–02	3	2ª B	2nd	Round of 32
2002–03	3	2ª B	5th	Round of 32
2003–04	3	2ª B	4th	Round of 32
2004–05	3	2ª B	10th	Round of 32
2005–06	3	2ª B	14th	
2006–07	3	2ª B	11th	
2007–08	3	2ª B	11th	
2008–09	3	2ª B	2nd	
2009–10	3	2ª B	12th	Round of 32
2010–11	3	2ª B	14th	
2011–12	4	3ª	3rd	
2012–13	4	3ª	2nd	
2013–14	3	2ª B	14th	

Season	Tier	Division	Place	Copa del Rey
2014–15	3	2ª B	7th	
2015–16	3	2ª B	7th	Second round
2016–17	3	2ª B	1st	Round of 32
2017–18	2	2ª	19th	Third round
2018–19	3	2ª B	5th	Round of 32
2019–20	3	2ª B	2nd	Round of 16
2020–21	3	2ª B	2nd / 6th	Second round
2021–22	3	1ª RFEF	12th	Second round
2022–23	3	1ª Fed.	10th	
2023–24	3	1ª Fed.	6th	
2024–25	3	1ª Fed.	1st	Second round
2025–26	2	2ª	21st	Round of 16
2026–27	3	1ª Fed.		TBD

- 1 season in La Liga
- 16 seasons in Segunda División
- 5 seasons in Primera Federación/Primera División RFEF
- 36 seasons in Segunda División B
- 31 seasons in Tercera División/ Segunda División Grupo B (24 on 3rd tier)

== Players ==
=== Current squad ===
As of 6 September 2026

Note: Flags indicate national team as defined under FIFA eligibility rules; some limited exceptions apply. Players may hold more than one non-FIFA nationality.

No.	Pos.	Nation	Player
1	GK	ESP	Miquel Parera
2	DF	ESP	Guzmán Ortega
3	DF	ESP	Jaime Vázquez
4	DF	ESP	Rodri
5	DF	ESP	Róber Pier
6	MF	ESP	Sergi Maestre
7	FW	ESP	Pedro Benito
8	MF	ESP	Assane Ndiaye
9	FW	ESP	Jorge Delgado
10	MF	ESP	Álex Cardero (on loan from Oviedo)
11	FW	ESP	Hugo García (on loan from Eibar)
13	GK	ESP	Miguel San Román

No.	Pos.	Nation	Player
14	MF	ESP	Bicho
15	DF	ESP	Antxón Jaso
16	DF	ESP	Oier López
17	DF	ESP	Carlos Pomares
18	FW	BRA	João Fersura (on loan from Betis)
19	FW	ESP	Antón Escobar
20	DF	ESP	Iago López
21	MF	ESP	Jon García
22	FW	ESP	Dani Queipo
23	MF	ESP	Ángel Algobia
24	DF	ROU	Bogdan Țîru

=== Reserve team ===
Note: Flags indicate national team as defined under FIFA eligibility rules; some limited exceptions apply. Players may hold more than one non-FIFA nationality.

No.	Pos.	Nation	Player
26	GK	ESP	Javier Palomares
27	MF	ESP	Mauro Fontanillo
28	DF	ESP	Víctor Pastor
29	DF	ESP	Lucas Martín
30	FW	ESP	Álex Oviedo
31	DF	ESP	Marcos Fernández

No.	Pos.	Nation	Player
32	FW	ESP	Alejandro Morante
33	FW	ESP	Hugo Aller
34	DF	ESP	Juan Merino
35	MF	ESP	Gael Ocón
36	FW	ESP	Arturo Suárez

== Coaching staff ==
Position	Name
Head coach	Jandro
Assistant coach	Jorge Pérez
Assistant coach	Julián Marín
Doctor	Alfredo Álvarez
Doctor	Marcos González
Doctor	Salustiano López-Contreras
Fitness coach	Roberto Lorenzo
Physiotherapist, Head of medical services	Javier Madinabeitia
Physiotherapist	Juan Mayo
Physiotherapist	Jorge Martínez
Delegate, Team manager	Luis Ballesteros
Goalkeeper coach	Javier Pérez
Rehab fitness coach	Alejandro Sierra
Equipment manager	Carlos Gómez Carballo
Equipment manager	Manuel Martínez Sela
Analyst	Pedro Gómez
Team delegate	Edu Álvarez

== Notable former players ==
Note: this list includes players that have appeared in at least 100 league games and/or have reached international status.

- (Spain) César
- (Spain) Chema
- (Spain) Iván Casquero
- (Spain) Sergio Fernández
- (Spain) Santi Santos
- (Japan) Yosuke Ideguchi
- (Qatar) Almoez Ali

== Famous coaches ==
- (Spain) Miguel Ángel Rubio

== Stadium ==
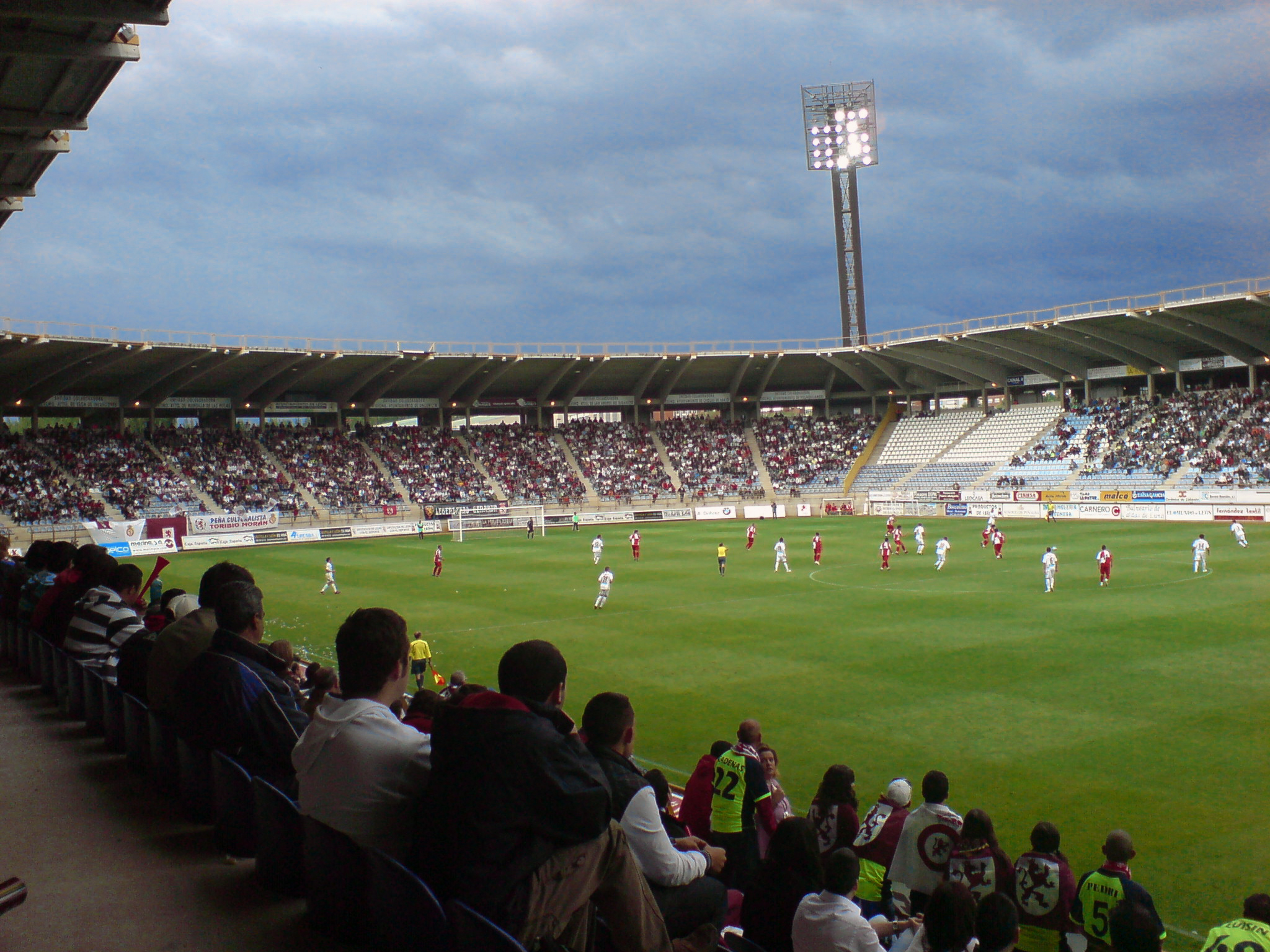
C. Leonesa vs. Sabadell, in the 2008–09 Segunda División promotion playoffs

== Reserve team ==
Júpiter Leonés is the reserve team of the club.

Founded in 1929, later known as Cultural de León and finally changed to its current name Cultural y Deportiva Leonesa "B" Jupiter Leonés. After the 2009–10, the team was dissolved after Cultural was relegated to Tercera División due to its debts. In 2014, it was re-founded as the reserve team and after three promotions it currently plays in Tercera División, the fourth tier, after gaining promotion in the Primera División Regional de Aficionados 2017–18 season.
