= List of J1 League football transfers winter 2019–20 =

This is a list of Japanese football J1 League transfers in the winter transfer window 2019–20 by club.

== J1 League ==
=== Yokohama F. Marinos ===
In: Note: Flags indicate national team as defined under FIFA eligibility rules; some limited exceptions apply. Players may hold more than one non-FIFA nationality.

No.	Pos.	Nation	Player
2	DF	JPN	Norimichi Yamamoto (from (Japan) Zweigen Kanazawa)
5	DF	THA	Theerathon Bunmathan (from (Thailand) Muangthong United, previously on loan)
13	DF	BRA	Thiago Martins (from (Brazil) Palmeiras, previously on loan)
18	MF	JPN	Kota Mizunuma (from (Japan) Cerezo Osaka)
20	MF	JPN	Ryuji Sugimoto (from (Japan) Tokushima Vortis)
21	GK	JPN	Yuji Kajikawa (from (Japan) Tokushima Vortis)
24	DF	JPN	Takayuki Mae (from (Japan) Renofa Yamaguchi)
29	DF	JPN	Ko Ikeda (promoted from youth ranks)
31	GK	JPN	Powell Obinna Obi (from Ryutsu Keizai University)
33	DF	JPN	Takuya Wada (from (Japan) Sanfrecce Hiroshima, previously on loan)
34	GK	JPN	Hirotsugu Nakabayashi (from (Japan) Sanfrecce Hiroshima, previously on loan)
41	MF	JPN	Keiya Sento (from (Japan) Kyoto Sanga)
45	FW	JPN	Ado Onaiwu (from (Japan) Urawa Red Diamonds)
—	GK	JPN	Tomoki Togawa (from Kokoku High School)
—	MF	JPN	Kaina Yoshio (from (Japan) Vegalta Sendai, end of loan)
—	MF	JPN	Kenta Hori (from (Japan) Blaublitz Akita, end of loan)
—	MF	JPN	Kota Yamada (from (Japan) Nagoya Grampus, end of loan)
—	MF	JPN	Ryonosuke Kabayama (from Kokoku High School)
—	FW	JPN	Masashi Wada (from (Japan) Blaublitz Akita, end of loan)

Out: Note: Flags indicate national team as defined under FIFA eligibility rules; some limited exceptions apply. Players may hold more than one non-FIFA nationality.

No.	Pos.	Nation	Player
2	DF	SRB	Dusan Cvetinovic (to (Japan) Tokushima Vortis)
4	DF	JPN	Yuzo Kurihara (retired)
18	DF	JPN	Rikuto Hirose (to (Japan) Kashima Antlers)
19	MF	JPN	Kazaki Nakagawa (to (Japan) Kyoto Sanga)
20	FW	JPN	Tadanari Lee (to (Japan) Kyoto Sanga)
28	MF	BRA	Mateus (to (Japan) Nagoya Grampus, end of loan)
31	GK	JPN	Daichi Sugimoto (to (Japan) Jubilo Iwata)
38	FW	JPN	Yushi Yamaya (on loan to (Japan) Mito HollyHock)
45	FW	JPN	Noah Kenshin Browne (on loan to (Japan) Kamatamare Sanuki)
49	MF	JPN	Jin Izumisawa (on loan to (Japan) Ventforet Kofu)
—	MF	JPN	Kaina Yoshio (on loan to (Japan) Machida Zelvia)
—	MF	JPN	Eitaro Matsuda (on loan to (Japan) SC Sagamihara)
—	MF	JPN	Kota Yamada (on loan to (Japan) Mito HollyHock)
—	MF	JPN	Kenta Hori (to (Japan) ReinMeer Aomori)
—	MF	KOR	Yun Il-lok (to (France) Montpellier)
—	FW	JPN	Shuto Machino (to (Japan) Giravanz Kitakyushu, previously on loan)

=== FC Tokyo ===
In: Note: Flags indicate national team as defined under FIFA eligibility rules; some limited exceptions apply. Players may hold more than one non-FIFA nationality.

No.	Pos.	Nation	Player
15	MF	BRA	Adaílton (from (Japan) Jubilo Iwata)
20	MF	BRA	Leandro (on loan from (Japan) Kashima Antlers)
31	MF	JPN	Shuto Abe (from Meiji University)
32	DF	LBN	Joan Oumari (from (Japan) Vissel Kobe)
34	MF	THA	Chayathorn Tapsuvanavon (on loan from (Thailand) Bangkok United FC)
37	DF	JPN	Hotaka Nakamura (from Meiji University)
38	MF	JPN	Kazuya Konno (from Hosei University)
40	MF	JPN	Rei Hirakawa (from (Japan) Kagoshima United FC, end of loan)
41	GK	JPN	Taishi Brandon Nozawa (promoted from youth ranks)
45	MF	BRA	Arthur Silva (from (Brazil) CA Votuporanguense, previously on loan)
47	DF	JPN	Seiji Kimura (promoted from youth ranks)
49	DF	JPN	Kashifu Bangunagande (promoted from youth ranks)
—	GK	JPN	Riku Hirosue (from (Japan) Renofa Yamaguchi, end of loan)
—	DF	JPN	Masayuki Yamada (from (Japan) Avispa Fukuoka, end of loan)
—	DF	JPN	Takahiro Yanagi (from (Japan) Montedio Yamagata, end of loan)
—	MF	JPN	Hideyuki Nozawa (from (Japan) Ehime FC, end of loan)

Out: Note: Flags indicate national team as defined under FIFA eligibility rules; some limited exceptions apply. Players may hold more than one non-FIFA nationality.

No.	Pos.	Nation	Player
16	FW	BRA	Jael (on loan to (Japan) Matsumoto Yamaga)
21	MF	KOR	Yu In-soo (to (South Korea) Seongnam FC)
22	DF	KOR	Oh Jae-suk (to (Japan) Gamba Osaka, end of loan)
29	DF	JPN	Makoto Okazaki (on loan to (Japan) Shimizu S-Pulse)
31	FW	THA	Nattawut Suksum (to (Thailand) Bangkok United FC, end of loan)
39	MF	JPN	Kotaro Omori (to (Japan) Jubilo Iwata)
—	GK	JPN	Riku Hirosue (on loan to (Japan) Machida Zelvia)
—	DF	JPN	Takahiro Yanagi (on loan to (Japan) Vegalta Sendai)
—	DF	JPN	Masayuki Yamada (on loan to (Japan) Zweigen Kanazawa)
—	MF	JPN	Hideyuki Nozawa (to (Japan) Ventforet Kofu)

=== Kashima Antlers ===
In: Note: Flags indicate national team as defined under FIFA eligibility rules; some limited exceptions apply. Players may hold more than one non-FIFA nationality.

No.	Pos.	Nation	Player
3	DF	JPN	Tatsuki Nara (from (Japan) Kawasaki Frontale)
5	DF	JPN	Daiki Sugioka (from (Japan) Shonan Bellmare)
7	MF	BRA	Juan Alano (from (Brazil) SC Internacional)
9	FW	BRA	Everaldo (from (Mexico) Queretaro FC)
11	MF	JPN	Ryuji Izumi (from (Japan) Nagoya Grampus)
14	DF	JPN	Katsuya Nagato (from (Japan) Vegalta Sendai)
19	FW	JPN	Itsuki Someno (from Shoshi High School)
22	DF	JPN	Rikuto Hirose (from (Japan) Yokohama F. Marinos)
26	MF	JPN	Ryotaro Araki (from Higashi Fukuoka High School)
27	MF	JPN	Yuta Matsumura (from Shizuoka Gakuen High School)
38	GK	JPN	Taiki Yamada (promoted from youth ranks)
—	MF	JPN	Kazune Kubota (from (Japan) Fagiano Okayama, end of loan)
—	FW	JPN	Yuki Kakita (from (Japan) Zweigen Kanazawa, end of loan)

Out: Note: Flags indicate national team as defined under FIFA eligibility rules; some limited exceptions apply. Players may hold more than one non-FIFA nationality.

No.	Pos.	Nation	Player
5	DF	KOR	Jung Seung-hyun (to (South Korea) Ulsan Hyundai FC)
11	MF	BRA	Leandro (on loan to (Japan) FC Tokyo)
13	MF	JPN	Atsutaka Nakamura (to (Japan) Montedio Yamagata)
18	FW	BRA	Serginho (to (China) Changchun Yatai)
19	FW	JPN	Kazuma Yamaguchi (on loan to (Japan) Mito HollyHock)
23	DF	JPN	Itsuki Oda (on loan to (Japan) Machida Zelvia)
26	DF	JPN	Yuta Koike (to (Belgium) Sint-Truiden VV)
29	GK	JPN	Shinichiro Kawamata (to (Japan) Nankatsu SC)
34	FW	JPN	Kotaro Arima (on loan to (Japan) Tochigi SC)
47	MF	JPN	Yuki Soma (to (Japan) Nagoya Grampus, end of loan)
—	MF	JPN	Kazune Kubota (to (Japan) Matsumoto Yamaga)
—	FW	JPN	Takeshi Kanamori (to (Japan) Sagan Tosu, previously on loan)
—	FW	JPN	Yuki Kakita (on loan to (Japan) Tokushima Vortis)

=== Kawasaki Frontale ===
In: Note: Flags indicate national team as defined under FIFA eligibility rules; some limited exceptions apply. Players may hold more than one non-FIFA nationality.

No.	Pos.	Nation	Player
4	DF	BRA	Jesiel (from (Brazil) Paraná Clube, previously on loan)
13	DF	JPN	Miki Yamane (from (Japan) Shonan Bellmare)
15	MF	JPN	Zain Issaka (from Toin University of Yokohama)
17	DF	BRA	Diogo Mateus (from (Brazil) Ferroviária)
18	MF	JPN	Kaoru Mitoma (from University of Tsukuba)
20	FW	JPN	Taisei Miyashiro (from (Japan) Renofa Yamaguchi, end of loan)
23	GK	JPN	Eisuke Fujishima (from (Japan) Renofa Yamaguchi, previously on loan)
26	DF	JPN	Kaito Kamiya (from Tokai Gakuen University)
27	GK	JPN	Kenta Tanno (from (Japan) Cerezo Osaka)
30	FW	JPN	Reo Hatate (from Juntendo University)
—	GK	JPN	Hiroki Mawatari (from (Japan) Ehime FC, previously on loan)
—	GK	JPN	William Popp (from (Japan) Oita Trinita, end of loan)
—	DF	JPN	Tabinas Jefferson (from (Japan) FC Gifu, end of loan)
—	FW	JPN	Shuhei Akasaki (from (Japan) Nagoya Grampus, end of loan)

Out: Note: Flags indicate national team as defined under FIFA eligibility rules; some limited exceptions apply. Players may hold more than one non-FIFA nationality.

No.	Pos.	Nation	Player
3	DF	JPN	Tatsuki Nara (to (Japan) Kashima Antlers)
8	MF	JPN	Hiroyuki Abe (to (Japan) Nagoya Grampus)
17	DF	JPN	Kazuaki Mawatari (on loan to (Japan) Shonan Bellmare)
20	FW	JPN	Kei Chinen (on loan to (Japan) Oita Trinita)
21	GK	JPN	Shota Arai (to (Japan) JEF United Chiba)
26	DF	BRA	Maguinho (on loan to (Japan) Yokohama FC)
36	GK	JPN	Hiroki Mawatari (to (Japan) Fagiano Okayama)
—	GK	JPN	William Popp (on loan to (Japan) Fagiano Okayama)
—	DF	JPN	Tabinas Jefferson (on loan to (Japan) Gamba Osaka)
—	MF	JPN	Yuto Suzuki (on loan to (Japan) Matsumoto Yamaga)
—	FW	JPN	Shuhei Akasaki (to (Japan) Vegalta Sendai)
—	FW	JPN	Ten Miyagi (on loan to (Japan) Kataller Toyama)
—	FW	JPN	Daiya Tono (on loan to (Japan) Avispa Fukuoka)

=== Cerezo Osaka ===
In: Note: Flags indicate national team as defined under FIFA eligibility rules; some limited exceptions apply. Players may hold more than one non-FIFA nationality.

No.	Pos.	Nation	Player
1	GK	JPN	Takumi Nagaishi (from (Japan) Renofa Yamaguchi, end of loan)
4	DF	JPN	Yuta Koike (from (Belgium) Sint-Truiden VV)
11	MF	BRA	Lucas Mineiro (on loan from (Brazil) Chapecoense)
17	MF	JPN	Tatsuhiro Sakamoto (from (Japan) Montedio Yamagata)
26	MF	JPN	Daichi Akiyama (from (Japan) Montedio Yamagata, end of loan)
27	GK	KOR	Ahn Joon-soo (from (Japan) Kagoshima United FC, end of loan)
29	MF	JPN	Takuya Shimamura (on loan from (Japan) Kyoto Sanga)
30	MF	JPN	Hinata Kida (from (Japan) Avispa Fukuoka, end of loan)
31	FW	JPN	Hirofumi Yamauchi (from (Japan) Machida Zelvia, end of loan)
32	FW	JPN	Yuta Toyokawa (from (Belgium) KAS Eupen)
39	DF	JPN	Honoya Shoji (from (Japan) Oita Trinita, end of loan)
41	MF	JPN	Nagi Matsumoto (promoted from youth ranks)
42	FW	JPN	Shota Fujio (promoted from youth ranks)
43	DF	JPN	Ryuya Nishio (promoted from youth ranks)
44	MF	JPN	Takaya Yoshinare (promoted from youth ranks)
46	DF	JPN	Tatsuya Tabira (from Kobe Koryo Gakuen High School)
47	MF	JPN	Taiga Maekawa (from (Japan) Avispa Fukuoka, end of loan)
49	MF	JPN	Jun Nishikawa (from Toko Gakuen High School)
—	DF	JPN	Reiya Morishita (from (Japan) Tochigi SC, end of loan)
—	MF	JPN	Takaki Fukumitsu (from (Japan) Mito HollyHock, end of loan)
—	FW	JPN	Hiroto Yamada (from (Japan) FC Ryukyu, end of loan)

Out: Note: Flags indicate national team as defined under FIFA eligibility rules; some limited exceptions apply. Players may hold more than one non-FIFA nationality.

No.	Pos.	Nation	Player
1	GK	JPN	Kentaro Kakoi (to (Japan) Matsumoto Yamaga)
4	DF	JPN	Kota Fujimoto (retired)
7	MF	JPN	Kota Mizunuma (to (Japan) Yokohama F. Marinos)
11	MF	BRA	Souza (to (Saudi Arabia) Al Ettifaq)
27	GK	JPN	Kenta Tanno (to (Japan) Kawasaki Frontale)
29	DF	JPN	Kakeru Funaki (on loan to (Japan) Jubilo Iwata)
30	MF	JPN	Musashi Oyama (released)
32	MF	JPN	Atomu Tanaka (to (Finland) HJK Helsinki)
35	MF	THA	Pongrawit Jantawong (to (Thailand) Pathum United FC, end of loan)
36	MF	JPN	Toshiki Onozawa (to (Japan) Giravanz Kitakyushu)
39	MF	JPN	Mitsuru Maruoka (released)
—	DF	JPN	Taiyo Shimokawa (to (Japan) Kamatamare Sanuki)
—	DF	JPN	Reiya Morishita (on loan to (Japan) Matsumoto Yamaga)
—	MF	JPN	Takaki Fukumitsu (on loan to (Japan) Avispa Fukuoka)
—	FW	JPN	Hiroto Yamada (on loan to (Japan) Vegalta Sendai)

=== Sanfrecce Hiroshima ===
In: Note: Flags indicate national team as defined under FIFA eligibility rules; some limited exceptions apply. Players may hold more than one non-FIFA nationality.

No.	Pos.	Nation	Player
13	GK	JPN	Takuya Masuda (from (Japan) Machida Zelvia, end of loan)
14	MF	BRA	Ezequiel (from (Brazil) Botafogo FR)
15	DF	JPN	Kazuki Kushibiki (from (Japan) Nagoya Grampus)
16	MF	JPN	Kohei Shimizu (from (Japan) Shimizu S-Pulse, previously on loan)
20	FW	JPN	Ryo Nagai (from (Japan) Matsumoto Yamaga)
25	MF	JPN	Yusuke Chajima (from (Japan) JEF United Chiba, end of loan)
26	MF	JPN	Kodai Doi (promoted from youth ranks)
27	FW	JPN	Shun Ayukawa (promoted from youth ranks)
29	MF	JPN	Yuya Asano (from (Japan) Mito HollyHock, end of loan)
50	MF	JPN	Tomoya Fujii (from Ritsumeikan University)
—	DF	JPN	Hiroki Mizumoto (from (Japan) Matsumoto Yamaga, end of loan)
—	FW	JPN	Masato Kudo (from (Japan) Renofa Yamaguchi, end of loan)

Out: Note: Flags indicate national team as defined under FIFA eligibility rules; some limited exceptions apply. Players may hold more than one non-FIFA nationality.

No.	Pos.	Nation	Player
3	DF	SWE	Emil Salomonsson (on loan to (Japan) Avispa Fukuoka)
5	MF	JPN	Kyohei Yoshino (to (Japan) Vegalta Sendai)
15	MF	JPN	Sho Inagaki (to (Japan) Nagoya Grampus)
16	FW	JPN	Daiki Watari (to (Japan) Oita Trinita)
—	GK	JPN	Hirotsugu Nakabayashi (to (Japan) Yokohama F. Marinos, previously on loan)
—	DF	JPN	Takuya Wada (to (Japan) Yokohama F. Marinos, previously on loan)
—	DF	JPN	Hiroki Mizumoto (on loan to (Japan) Machida Zelvia)
—	FW	BRA	Patric (to (Japan) Gamba Osaka, previously on loan)

=== Gamba Osaka ===
In: Note: Flags indicate national team as defined under FIFA eligibility rules; some limited exceptions apply. Players may hold more than one non-FIFA nationality.

No.	Pos.	Nation	Player
3	DF	JPN	Gen Shoji (from (France) Toulouse FC)
11	MF	JPN	Yuji Ono (from (Japan) Sagan Tosu)
16	GK	JPN	Jun Ichimori (from (Japan) Fagiano Okayama)
17	DF	JPN	Ryo Shinzato (on loan from (Japan) Jubilo Iwata)
18	FW	BRA	Patric (from (Japan) Sanfrecce Hiroshima, previously on loan)
22	DF	KOR	Oh Jae-suk (from (Japan) FC Tokyo, end of loan)
23	MF	JPN	Mizuki Ichimaru (from (Japan) FC Gifu, end of loan)
24	DF	JPN	Keisuke Kurokawa (from Kansai University)
25	GK	JPN	Kei Ishikawa (from (Japan) Sagan Tosu)
28	DF	JPN	Tabinas Jefferson (on loan from (Japan) Kawasaki Frontale)
29	MF	JPN	Yuki Yamamoto (from Kwansei Gakuin University)
30	FW	JPN	Dai Tsukamoto (promoted from youth ranks)
31	GK	JPN	Haruki Saruta (on loan from (Japan) Kashiwa Reysol)
34	FW	JPN	Shuhei Kawasaki (promoted from youth ranks)
40	DF	KOR	Shin Won-ho (from (South Korea) Seoul Boin High School)
38	FW	JPN	Shinji Toyama (promoted from youth ranks)
50	GK	KOR	Lee Yun-oh (on loan from (Japan) Vegalta Sendai)
—	DF	KOR	Bae Soo-yong (from (Japan) Kamatamare Sanuki, end of loan)
—	MF	JPN	Jungo Fujimoto (from (Japan) Kyoto Sanga, end of loan)
—	FW	JPN	Kazunari Ichimi (from (Japan) Kyoto Sanga, end of loan)
—	FW	JPN	Hiroto Goya (from (Japan) V-Varen Nagasaki, end of loan)
—	FW	JPN	Akito Takagi (from (Japan) Montedio Yamagata, end of loan)

Out: Note: Flags indicate national team as defined under FIFA eligibility rules; some limited exceptions apply. Players may hold more than one non-FIFA nationality.

No.	Pos.	Nation	Player
11	MF	ESP	David Concha (to (Spain) Real Sociedad, end of loan)
14	MF	ESP	Markel Susaeta (to (Australia) Melbourne City FC)
23	GK	JPN	Mizuki Hayashi (on loan to (Japan) Renofa Yamaguchi)
29	MF	JPN	Leo Takae (on loan to (Japan) Machida Zelvia)
30	DF	JPN	Naoaki Aoyama (to (Japan) Kagoshima United FC)
41	GK	JPN	Kosei Tani (on loan to (Japan) Shonan Bellmare)
—	GK	JPN	Ryota Suzuki (to (Japan) JEF United Chiba, previously on loan)
—	DF	JPN	Koki Yonekura (to (Japan) JEF United Chiba, previously on loan)
—	DF	KOR	Bae Soo-yong (to (South Korea) Chungnam Asan)
—	MF	JPN	Jungo Fujimoto (released)
—	FW	JPN	Akito Takagi (on loan to (Japan) Matsumoto Yamaga)
—	FW	JPN	Hiroto Goya (to (Japan) Kashiwa Reysol)
—	FW	JPN	Kazunari Ichimi (on loan to (Japan) Yokohama FC)

=== Vissel Kobe ===
In: Note: Flags indicate national team as defined under FIFA eligibility rules; some limited exceptions apply. Players may hold more than one non-FIFA nationality.

No.	Pos.	Nation	Player
17	DF	JPN	Ryuho Kikuchi (from (Japan) Renofa Yamaguchi)
19	DF	JPN	Ryo Hatsuse (from (Japan) Avispa Fukuoka, end of loan)
23	MF	JPN	Tetsushi Yamakawa (from University of Tsukuba)
31	MF	JPN	Yuya Nakasaka (from (Japan) Kyoto Sanga, end of loan)
41	FW	JPN	Yutaro Oda (promoted from youth ranks)
49	FW	JPN	Douglas (from (Japan) Shimizu S-Pulse)
—	DF	JPN	Daiki Miya (from (Japan) Mito HollyHock, end of loan)
—	DF	JPN	Yuki Kobayashi (from (Japan) Machida Zelvia, end of loan)
—	MF	JPN	Tatsuki Noda (from (Japan) Kataller Toyama, end of loan)
—	FW	JPN	Akito Mukai (from (Japan) FC Imabari, end of loan)

Out: Note: Flags indicate national team as defined under FIFA eligibility rules; some limited exceptions apply. Players may hold more than one non-FIFA nationality.

No.	Pos.	Nation	Player
2	DF	JPN	Daisuke Nasu (retired)
7	FW	JPN	David Villa (retired)
10	FW	GER	Lukas Podolski (to (Turkey) Antalyaspor)
17	FW	BRA	Wellington (to (Brazil) Botafogo FC)
20	MF	JPN	Asahi Masuyama (on loan to (Japan) Avispa Fukuoka)
29	GK	JPN	Kota Ogi (retired)
32	DF	JPN	Wataru Hashimoto (to (Japan) FC Gifu)
44	DF	LBN	Joan Oumari (to (Japan) FC Tokyo)
—	DF	JPN	Daiki Miya (to (Japan) Sagan Tosu)
—	DF	JPN	Yuki Kobayashi (on loan to (Japan) Yokohama FC)
—	MF	JPN	Masatoshi Mihara (to (Japan) Kashiwa Reysol, previously on loan)
—	MF	JPN	Tatsuki Noda (released)
—	FW	JPN	Akito Mukai (to (Spain) Terrassa FC)
—	FW	JPN	Mike Havenaar (to (Japan) Ventforet Kofu)

=== Oita Trinita ===
In: Note: Flags indicate national team as defined under FIFA eligibility rules; some limited exceptions apply. Players may hold more than one non-FIFA nationality.

No.	Pos.	Nation	Player
2	DF	JPN	Yuki Kagawa (from (Japan) V-Varen Nagasaki)
8	MF	JPN	Yamato Machida (from (Japan) Matsumoto Yamaga)
9	FW	JPN	Kei Chinen (on loan from (Japan) Kawasaki Frontale)
10	MF	JPN	Naoki Nomura (from (Japan) Tokushima Vortis)
15	DF	JPN	Yuta Koide (from (Japan) Ventforet Kofu)
16	FW	JPN	Daiki Watari (from (Japan) Sanfrecce Hiroshima)
26	MF	JPN	Kazuhiro Sato (from (Japan) Ventforet Kofu)
30	DF	JPN	Yusho Takahashi (from Yonago Kita High School)
31	FW	JPN	Yuya Takazawa (from (Japan) Thespakusatsu Gunma)
38	MF	JPN	Keita Takahata (from (Japan) Gainare Tottori, end of loan)
42	GK	JPN	Shoya Katsuki (promoted from youth ranks)
44	GK	JPN	Shun Yoshida (from (Japan) Thespakusatsu Gunma)
47	MF	JPN	Kenta Inoue (from Fukuoka University)
49	DF	JPN	Kento Haneda (from Kansai University)
—	DF	JPN	Sodai Kudo (promoted from youth ranks)
—	MF	JPN	Kazuki Egashira (from (Japan) Iwate Grulla Morioka, end of loan)
—	MF	JPN	Yuya Himeno (from (Japan) Thespakusatsu Gunma, end of loan)
—	MF	JPN	Daisuke Sakai (from (Japan) Thespakusatsu Gunma, end of loan)
—	MF	JPN	Kenji Baba (from (Japan) FC Gifu, end of loan)
—	MF	JPN	Masaki Yumiba (promoted from youth ranks)
—	FW	JPN	Kento Hirakawa (promoted from youth ranks)

Out: Note: Flags indicate national team as defined under FIFA eligibility rules; some limited exceptions apply. Players may hold more than one non-FIFA nationality.

No.	Pos.	Nation	Player
8	MF	JPN	Takuya Marutani (retired)
9	FW	JPN	Yusuke Goto (to (Japan) Shimizu S-Pulse)
16	DF	JPN	Jun Okano (to (Japan) JEF United Chiba, end of loan)
21	GK	JPN	Ryosuke Kojima (on loan to (Japan) Albirex Niigata)
31	GK	JPN	William Popp (to (Japan) Kawasaki Frontale, end of loan)
37	MF	JPN	Shintaro Shimada (to (Japan) Omiya Ardija, end of loan)
39	DF	JPN	Honoya Shoji (to (Japan) Cerezo Osaka, end of loan)
44	MF	THA	Thitiphan Puangjan (to (Thailand) Pathum United FC)
45	FW	JPN	Ado Onaiwu (to (Japan) Urawa Red Diamonds, end of loan)
46	MF	JPN	Ryotaro Ito (to (Japan) Urawa Red Diamonds, end of loan)
—	MF	JPN	Kazuki Egashira (retired)
—	MF	JPN	Takuya Nogami (to (Japan) Vonds Ichihara, previously on loan)
—	MF	JPN	Daisuke Sakai (on loan to (Japan) Gainare Tottori)
—	MF	JPN	Kenji Baba (to (Japan) Kagoshima United FC)
—	MF	JPN	Yuya Himeno (on loan to (Japan) Fujieda MYFC)
—	FW	JPN	Tsubasa Yoshihira (to (Japan) Fujieda MYFC, previously on loan)

=== Hokkaido Consadole Sapporo ===
In: Note: Flags indicate national team as defined under FIFA eligibility rules; some limited exceptions apply. Players may hold more than one non-FIFA nationality.

No.	Pos.	Nation	Player
1	GK	JPN	Takanori Sugeno (from (Japan) Kyoto Sanga, previously on loan)
7	MF	BRA	Lucas Fernandes (from (Brazil) Fluminense, previously on loan)
29	GK	THA	Kawin Thamsatchanan (on loan from (Belgium) OH Leuven)
30	MF	JPN	Takuro Kaneko (from Nihon University)
31	MF	JPN	Tomoki Takamine (from University of Tsukuba)
32	DF	JPN	Shunta Tanaka (from Osaka University of Health & Sport Sciences)
33	FW	BRA	Douglas Oliveira (from (Brazil) Luverdense)
34	GK	JPN	Kojiro Nakano (from Hosei University)
—	DF	JPN	Koki Kanno (promoted from youth ranks)
—	MF	JPN	Shuma Kido (promoted from youth ranks)
—	FW	JPN	Yosei Sato (promoted from youth ranks)
—	FW	JPN	Ren Yamato (promoted from youth ranks)

Out: Note: Flags indicate national team as defined under FIFA eligibility rules; some limited exceptions apply. Players may hold more than one non-FIFA nationality.

No.	Pos.	Nation	Player
13	FW	JPN	Yuto Iwasaki (on loan to (Japan) Shonan Bellmare)

=== Vegalta Sendai ===
In: Note: Flags indicate national team as defined under FIFA eligibility rules; some limited exceptions apply. Players may hold more than one non-FIFA nationality.

No.	Pos.	Nation	Player
2	DF	BRA	Pará (from (Brazil) Botafogo SP)
9	MF	ESP	Isaac Cuenca (from (Japan) Sagan Tosu)
11	FW	JPN	Shuhei Akasaki (from (Japan) Kawasaki Frontale)
16	MF	JPN	Kyohei Yoshino (from (Japan) Sanfrecce Hiroshima)
24	GK	JPN	Yuma Obata (promoted from youth ranks)
26	DF	JPN	Takuma Hamasaki (from (Japan) Mito HollyHock)
28	MF	JPN	Takumi Sasaki (from (Japan) Renofa Yamaguchi, end of loan)
29	FW	BRA	Alexandre Guedes (from (Portugal) Vitória S.C.)
36	DF	JPN	Takahiro Yanagi (on loan from (Japan) FC Tokyo)
42	FW	JPN	Hiroto Yamada (on loan from (Japan) Cerezo Osaka)
—	GK	KOR	Lee Yun-oh (from (Japan) Fukushima United FC, end of loan)
—	DF	JPN	Masaya Kojima (from (Japan) Zweigen Kanazawa, end of loan)
—	DF	JPN	Hisashi Appiah Tawiah (from Ryutsu Keizai University)
—	DF	JPN	Takumi Mase (from Hannan University)
—	MF	JPN	Fumiya Suzuki (promoted from youth ranks)
—	FW	JPN	Naito Yoshida (promoted from youth ranks)

Out: Note: Flags indicate national team as defined under FIFA eligibility rules; some limited exceptions apply. Players may hold more than one non-FIFA nationality.

No.	Pos.	Nation	Player
3	DF	JPN	Katsuya Nagato (to (Japan) Kashima Antlers)
9	FW	BRA	Ramon Lopes (to (United Arab Emirates) Khor Fakkan)
10	MF	PRK	Ryang Yong-gi (to (Japan) Sagan Tosu)
11	FW	JPN	Naoki Ishihara (to (Japan) Shonan Bellmare)
15	MF	JPN	Kaina Yoshio (to (Japan) Yokohama F. Marinos, end of loan)
20	FW	JPN	Takuma Abe (to (Japan) FC Ryukyu)
27	DF	JPN	Kazuki Oiwa (to (Japan) Shonan Bellmare)
29	FW	BRA	Diogo Acosta (released)
33	DF	JPN	Masato Tokida (on loan to (Japan) Matsumoto Yamaga)
—	GK	KOR	Lee Yun-oh (on loan to (Japan) Gamba Osaka)
—	DF	JPN	Masaya Kojima (to (Japan) Thespakusatsu Gunma)

=== Shimizu S-Pulse ===
In: Note: Flags indicate national team as defined under FIFA eligibility rules; some limited exceptions apply. Players may hold more than one non-FIFA nationality.

No.	Pos.	Nation	Player
5	DF	BRA	Valdo (from (Brazil) Ceara SC)
10	FW	BRA	Carlinhos Junior (from (Switzerland) FC Lugano)
13	MF	JPN	Kota Miyamoto (from (Japan) FC Gifu, end of loan)
14	FW	JPN	Yusuke Goto (from (Japan) Oita Trinita)
15	DF	JPN	Takashi Kanai (from (Japan) Nagoya Grampus)
21	DF	JPN	Ryo Okui (from (Japan) Omiya Ardija)
23	FW	THA	Teerasil Dangda (from (Thailand) Muangthong United FC)
24	DF	JPN	Makoto Okazaki (on loan from (Japan) FC Tokyo)
28	MF	JPN	Yasufumi Nishimura (from (Japan) Fagiano Okayama, end of loan)
32	GK	BRA	Neto Volpi (from (Colombia) America de Cali)
33	FW	JPN	Riyo Kawamoto (promoted from youth ranks)
34	DF	JPN	Erick Noriega (promoted from youth ranks)
36	FW	JPN	Ibrahim Junior Kuribara (from (Japan) Mitsubishi Yowa SC)
37	MF	JPN	Yuito Suzuki (from Ichiritsu Funabashi High School)
—	GK	JPN	Yoshiaki Arai (from (Japan) Zweigen Kanazawa, end of loan)

Out: Note: Flags indicate national team as defined under FIFA eligibility rules; some limited exceptions apply. Players may hold more than one non-FIFA nationality.

No.	Pos.	Nation	Player
5	DF	JPN	Shoma Kamata (to (Japan) Blaublitz Akita)
13	GK	JPN	Yuji Rokutan (on loan to (Japan) Yokohama FC)
14	MF	JPN	Jumpei Kusukami (to (Japan) Nankatsu SC)
15	MF	JPN	Takuma Mizutani (to (Japan) Nagano Parceiro)
21	GK	JPN	Toru Takagiwa (on loan to (Japan) V-Varen Nagasaki)
25	DF	JPN	Ko Matsubara (to (Belgium) Sint-Truiden VV)
26	DF	JPN	Hiroshi Futami (to (Japan) V-Varen Nagasaki)
27	DF	JPN	Takahiro Iida (to (Japan) Kyoto Sanga)
49	FW	JPN	Douglas (to (Japan) Vissel Kobe)
—	MF	JPN	Chikashi Masuda (retired)
—	MF	JPN	Kohei Shimizu (to (Japan) Sanfrecce Hiroshima, previously on loan)

=== Nagoya Grampus ===
In: Note: Flags indicate national team as defined under FIFA eligibility rules; some limited exceptions apply. Players may hold more than one non-FIFA nationality.

No.	Pos.	Nation	Player
11	MF	JPN	Hiroyuki Abe (from (Japan) Kawasaki Frontale)
14	DF	JPN	Yosuke Akiyama (from (Japan) Jubilo Iwata, end of loan)
15	MF	JPN	Sho Inagaki (from (Japan) Sanfrecce Hiroshima)
16	MF	BRA	Mateus (from (Japan) Yokohama F. Marinos, end of loan)
17	FW	JPN	Ryogo Yamasaki (from (Japan) Shonan Bellmare)
22	GK	JPN	Daiki Mitsui (promoted from youth ranks)
24	DF	JPN	Ryotaro Ishida (promoted from youth ranks)
27	MF	JPN	Yuki Soma (from (Japan) Kashima Antlers, end of loan)
28	DF	JPN	Akira Yoshida (from Kyushu International University High School)
30	MF	JPN	Hidemasa Koda (promoted from youth ranks)
—	DF	JPN	Kazuki Kushibiki (from (Japan) Omiya Ardija, end of loan)
—	DF	JPN	Takashi Kanai (from (Japan) Sagan Tosu, end of loan)
—	FW	JPN	Jonathan Matsuoka (from (Japan) SC Sagamihara, end of loan)

Out: Note: Flags indicate national team as defined under FIFA eligibility rules; some limited exceptions apply. Players may hold more than one non-FIFA nationality.

No.	Pos.	Nation	Player
15	MF	JPN	Hiroki Ito (to (Japan) Jubilo Iwata, end of loan)
21	MF	BRA	Eduardo Neto (released)
28	MF	JPN	Daiki Enomoto (on loan to (Japan) Tokushima Vortis)
29	MF	JPN	Ryuji Izumi (to (Japan) Kashima Antlers)
32	FW	JPN	Shuhei Akasaki (to (Japan) Kawasaki Frontale, end of loan)
37	MF	JPN	Shumpei Fukahori (on loan to (Japan) Mito HollyHock)
38	MF	JPN	Kota Yamada (to (Japan) Yokohama F. Marinos, end of loan)
—	DF	JPN	Takashi Kanai (to (Japan) Shimizu S-Pulse)
—	DF	JPN	Yukinari Sugawara (to (Netherlands) AZ Alkmaar, previously on loan)
—	DF	JPN	Kazuki Kushibiki (to (Japan) Sanfrecce Hiroshima)
—	DF	JPN	Ikki Arai (to (Japan) JEF United Chiba, previously on loan)
—	FW	JPN	Jonathan Matsuoka (on loan to (Japan) ReinMeer Aomori)

=== Urawa Red Diamonds ===
In: Note: Flags indicate national team as defined under FIFA eligibility rules; some limited exceptions apply. Players may hold more than one non-FIFA nationality.

No.	Pos.	Nation	Player
13	MF	JPN	Ryotaro Ito (from (Japan) Oita Trinita, end of loan)
20	DF	AUS	Thomas Deng (from (Australia) Melbourne Victory)
36	GK	JPN	Zion Suzuki (promoted from youth ranks)
37	MF	JPN	Hidetoshi Takeda (from Aomori Yamada High School)
45	FW	JPN	Leonardo (from (Japan) Albirex Niigata)
—	MF	JPN	Tomoaki Okubo (from Chuo University)
—	FW	JPN	Ado Onaiwu (from (Japan) Oita Trinita, end of loan)

Out: Note: Flags indicate national team as defined under FIFA eligibility rules; some limited exceptions apply. Players may hold more than one non-FIFA nationality.

No.	Pos.	Nation	Player
23	GK	JPN	Nao Iwadate (to (Japan) Criacao Shinjuku)
33	MF	JPN	Nobuki Iketaka (on loan to (Japan) Kataller Toyama)
34	DF	JPN	Kei Oshiro (on loan to (Japan) Gainare Tottori)
46	DF	JPN	Ryota Moriwaki (to (Japan) Kyoto Sanga)
—	DF	JPN	Rikiya Motegi (to (Japan) Ehime FC, previously on loan)
—	MF	JPN	Atsuki Yamanaka (to (Japan) Thespakusatsu Gunma)
—	MF	JPN	Naoki Yamada (to (Japan) Shonan Bellmare, previously on loan)
—	MF	JPN	Haruki Izawa (on loan to (Japan) Kagoshima United FC)
—	FW	JPN	Ado Onaiwu (to (Japan) Yokohama F. Marinos)

=== Sagan Tosu ===
In: Note: Flags indicate national team as defined under FIFA eligibility rules; some limited exceptions apply. Players may hold more than one non-FIFA nationality.

No.	Pos.	Nation	Player
1	GK	JPN	Tatsuya Morita (from (Japan) Matsumoto Yamaga)
3	DF	BRA	Eduardo (from (Japan) Matsumoto Yamaga)
6	DF	JPN	Yuto Uchida (from (Japan) Tokushima Vortis)
7	FW	JPN	Takeshi Kanamori (from (Japan) Kashima Antlers, previously on loan)
8	DF	JPN	Keisuke Iwashita (from (Japan) Avispa Fukuoka, previously on loan)
9	FW	BRA	Tiago Alves (from (South Korea) Jeonbuk Hyundai Motors, previously on loan)
12	GK	JPN	Yosei Itahashi (promoted from youth ranks)
16	FW	JPN	Daichi Hayashi (from Osaka University of Health & Sport Sciences)
20	FW	URU	Renzo Lopez (on loan from (Uruguay) Plaza Colonia)
22	MF	JPN	Tomoya Koyamatsu (from (Japan) Kyoto Sanga)
23	MF	JPN	Fuchi Honda (promoted from youth ranks)
26	DF	CHN	Wang Jianan (from (China) Guangzhou R&F)
28	DF	JPN	Ryoya Morishita (from Meiji University)
31	DF	JPN	Ayumu Ohata (promoted from youth ranks)
32	MF	JPN	Yosuke Yuzawa (from (Japan) Kyoto Sanga)
38	DF	JPN	Daiki Miya (from (Japan) Vissel Kobe)
39	DF	JPN	Daisuke Matsumoto (from Chuo University)
43	FW	JPN	Reoto Kodama (promoted from youth ranks)
50	MF	PRK	Ryang Yong-gi (from (Japan) Vegalta Sendai)

Out: Note: Flags indicate national team as defined under FIFA eligibility rules; some limited exceptions apply. Players may hold more than one non-FIFA nationality.

No.	Pos.	Nation	Player
2	DF	JPN	Hiromu Mitsumaru (to (Japan) Kashiwa Reysol)
3	DF	JPN	Yuji Takahashi (to (Japan) Kashiwa Reysol)
5	DF	JPN	Takashi Kanai (to (Japan) Nagoya Grampus, end of loan)
6	MF	JPN	Akito Fukuta (to (Japan) Shonan Bellmare)
7	MF	ESP	Isaac Cuenca (to (Japan) Vegalta Sendai)
16	GK	JPN	Kei Ishikawa (to (Japan) Gamba Osaka)
24	DF	JPN	Kazuki Anzai (on loan to (Japan) Renofa Yamaguchi)
28	MF	JPN	Hiroto Ishikawa (on loan to (Japan) Roasso Kumamoto)
29	MF	JPN	Hiroyuki Taniguchi (retired)
35	DF	JPN	Masato Fujita (to (Japan) Ventforet Kofu)
40	MF	JPN	Yuji Ono (to (Japan) Gamba Osaka)
—	MF	JPN	Hiroki Kawano (to (Japan) Tokyo Verdy, previously on loan)
—	MF	JPN	Yatsunori Shimaya (to (Japan) Tokushima Vortis, previously on loan)

=== Shonan Bellmare ===
In: Note: Flags indicate national team as defined under FIFA eligibility rules; some limited exceptions apply. Players may hold more than one non-FIFA nationality.

No.	Pos.	Nation	Player
3	DF	JPN	Kazuaki Mawatari (on loan from (Japan) Kawasaki Frontale)
10	MF	JPN	Naoki Yamada (from (Japan) Urawa Red Diamonds, previously on loan)
11	FW	NOR	Tarik Elyounoussi (from (Sweden) AIK)
13	FW	JPN	Naoki Ishihara (from (Japan) Vegalta Sendai)
14	MF	JPN	Hiroto Nakagawa (from (Japan) Kashiwa Reysol, previously on loan)
15	MF	JPN	Akito Fukuta (from (Japan) Sagan Tosu)
19	DF	JPN	Koki Tachi (from Nihon University)
20	FW	JPN	Yuto Iwasaki (on loan from (Japan) Hokkaido Consadole Sapporo)
21	GK	JPN	Masaaki Goto (from (Japan) Zweigen Kanazawa, end of loan)
22	DF	JPN	Kazuki Oiwa (from (Japan) Vegalta Sendai)
23	MF	JPN	Akimi Barada (from (Japan) Omiya Ardija)
25	GK	JPN	Kosei Tani (on loan from (Japan) Gamba Osaka)
26	DF	JPN	Taiga Hata (from Ichiritsu Funabashi High School)
29	MF	JPN	Hidetoshi Miyuki (from (Japan) Renofa Yamaguchi)
31	GK	JPN	Daiki Hotta (from (Japan) Fukushima United FC)
32	MF	JPN	Satoshi Tanaka (promoted from youth ranks)
33	MF	JPN	Asahi Yokokawa (promoted from youth ranks)
34	DF	JPN	Haneto Sakuma (from Nihon University)
35	MF	JPN	Naoki Hara (promoted from youth ranks)
36	DF	JPN	Taisei Ishii (promoted from youth ranks)
38	DF	JPN	Hirokazu Ishihara (from (Japan) Avispa Fukuoka, end of loan)
—	MF	BRA	Leleu (from (Japan) Mito HollyHock, end of loan)
—	FW	JPN	Yamato Wakatsuki (from Kiryu Daiichi High School)
—	FW	JPN	Yuta Kamiya (from (Japan) Ehime FC, end of loan)
—	FW	JPN	Kunitomo Suzuki (from (Japan) Gainare Tottori, end of loan)

Out: Note: Flags indicate national team as defined under FIFA eligibility rules; some limited exceptions apply. Players may hold more than one non-FIFA nationality.

No.	Pos.	Nation	Player
1	GK	JPN	Yota Akimoto (on loan to (Japan) Machida Zelvia)
2	MF	JPN	Shunsuke Kikuchi (to (Japan) Omiya Ardija)
3	DF	BRA	Freire (to (Japan) V-Varen Nagasaki)
5	DF	JPN	Daiki Sugioka (to (Japan) Kashima Antlers)
11	FW	JPN	Ryogo Yamasaki (to (Japan) Nagoya Grampus)
13	DF	JPN	Miki Yamane (to (Japan) Kawasaki Frontale)
15	FW	JPN	Ryunosuke Noda (to (Japan) Kyoto Sanga)
23	DF	JPN	Masahito Onoda (to (Japan) FC Imabari, end of loan)
25	GK	JPN	Shuhei Matsubara (to (Japan) Thespakusatsu Gunma)
26	FW	JPN	Kazuki Yamaguchi (to (Japan) FC Ryukyu)
29	DF	JPN	Hayato Fukushima (on loan to (Japan) Fukushima United FC)
31	GK	JPN	Kota Sanada (on loan to (Japan) Nara Club)
32	MF	JPN	Hikaru Arai (on loan to (Japan) Gainare Tottori)
36	FW	JPN	Ömer Tokaç (on loan to (Japan) Fukushima United FC)
—	MF	JPN	Hiroki Akino (to (Japan) V-Varen Nagasaki, previously on loan)
—	MF	BRA	Riuler Oliveira (on loan to (Japan) FC Osaka)
—	FW	JPN	Yamato Wakatsuki (on loan to (Switzerland) FC Sion)
—	FW	JPN	Yuta Kamiya (to (Japan) Kashiwa Reysol)
—	FW	JPN	Kunitomo Suzuki (on loan to (Japan) Giravanz Kitakyushu)
—	FW	JPN	Jin Hanato (to (Japan) Tokyo Verdy, previously on loan)

=== Kashiwa Reysol ===
In: Note: Flags indicate national team as defined under FIFA eligibility rules; some limited exceptions apply. Players may hold more than one non-FIFA nationality.

No.	Pos.	Nation	Player
3	DF	JPN	Yuji Takahashi (from (Japan) Sagan Tosu)
13	DF	JPN	Kengo Kitazume (from (Japan) Yokohama FC)
17	GK	KOR	Kim Seung-gyu (from (South Korea) Ulsan Hyundai FC)
20	DF	JPN	Hiromu Mitsumaru (from (Japan) Sagan Tosu)
22	MF	BRA	Matheus Sávio (from (Brazil) Flamengo, previously on loan)
24	DF	JPN	Naoki Kawaguchi (from (Japan) Albirex Niigata, previously on loan)
25	DF	JPN	Takuma Ominami (from (Japan) Jubilo Iwata)
27	MF	JPN	Masatoshi Mihara (from (Japan) Vissel Kobe, previously on loan)
28	MF	JPN	Sachiro Toshima (from (Japan) Albirex Niigata)
31	FW	JPN	Hiroto Goya (from (Japan) Gamba Osaka)
33	MF	JPN	Hayato Nakama (from (Japan) Fagiano Okayama)
35	FW	JPN	Mao Hosoya (promoted from youth ranks)
37	FW	JPN	Fumiya Unoki (promoted from youth ranks)
39	FW	JPN	Yuta Kamiya (from (Japan) Shonan Bellmare)
40	DF	JPN	Keita Ide (promoted from youth ranks)
46	GK	JPN	Kenta Matsumoto (from Toyo University)
—	GK	JPN	Haruki Saruta (from (Japan) Kagoshima United FC, end of loan)
—	DF	JPN	So Nakagawa (from (Japan) SC Sagamihara, end of loan)
—	MF	JPN	Kazuya Murata (from (Japan) Avispa Fukuoka, end of loan)

Out: Note: Flags indicate national team as defined under FIFA eligibility rules; some limited exceptions apply. Players may hold more than one non-FIFA nationality.

No.	Pos.	Nation	Player
3	DF	JPN	Daichi Tagami (on loan to (Japan) Albirex Niigata)
17	MF	JPN	Kohei Tezuka (on loan to (Japan) Yokohama FC)
19	MF	BRA	Gabriel (to (Brazil) Flamengo, end of loan)
20	DF	JPN	Takumi Kamijima (on loan to (Japan) Avispa Fukuoka)
24	DF	JPN	Toshiaki Miyamoto (on loan to (Japan) Montedio Yamagata)
25	MF	JPN	Riku Tanaka (on loan to (Japan) Renofa Yamaguchi)
34	DF	JPN	Hayate Sugii (on loan to (Japan) Zweigen Kanazawa)
38	MF	JPN	Daisuke Kikuchi (on loan to (Japan) Avispa Fukuoka)
—	GK	JPN	Haruki Saruta (on loan to (Japan) Gamba Osaka)
—	DF	JPN	Takuya Hashiguchi (to (Japan) FC Gifu)
—	DF	JPN	So Nakagawa (to (Japan) Jubilo Iwata)
—	DF	JPN	Tatsuya Masushima (to (Japan) JEF United Chiba, previously on loan)
—	DF	KOR	Yun Suk-young (to (South Korea) Busan IPark)
—	MF	KOR	Kim Bo-kyung (to (South Korea) Jeonbuk Hyundai Motors)
—	MF	JPN	Hiroto Nakagawa (to (Japan) Shonan Bellmare, previously on loan)
—	MF	JPN	Kazuya Murata (on loan to (Japan) Renofa Yamaguchi)

=== Yokohama FC ===
In: Note: Flags indicate national team as defined under FIFA eligibility rules; some limited exceptions apply. Players may hold more than one non-FIFA nationality.

No.	Pos.	Nation	Player
3	DF	BRA	Maguinho (on loan from (Japan) Kawasaki Frontale)
4	DF	JPN	Yuki Kobayashi (on loan from (Japan) Vissel Kobe)
6	MF	JPN	Tatsuki Seko (from Meiji University)
9	FW	JPN	Kazunari Ichimi (on loan from (Japan) Gamba Osaka)
14	DF	JPN	Takaaki Shichi (from (Japan) Mito HollyHock)
21	GK	JPN	Akinori Ichikawa (from (Japan) Gainare Tottori, end of loan)
28	MF	JPN	Reo Yasunaga (from (Japan) Kataller Toyama, end of loan)
29	DF	JPN	Kyowan Hoshi (from Komazawa University)
30	MF	JPN	Kohei Tezuka (on loan from (Japan) Kashiwa Reysol)
32	MF	JPN	Riku Furuyado (from Aomori Yamada High School)
34	MF	JPN	Kakeru Kumagawa (from (Japan) Iwaki FC)
37	MF	JPN	Yusuke Matsuo (from Sendai University)
44	GK	JPN	Yuji Rokutan (on loan from (Japan) Shimizu S-Pulse)
—	DF	JPN	Yuya Takagi (from Hosei University)
—	DF	JPN	Daichi Inui (from (Japan) Tochigi SC, end of loan)
—	MF	JPN	Yota Maejima (from (Japan) Kataller Toyama, end of loan)

Out: Note: Flags indicate national team as defined under FIFA eligibility rules; some limited exceptions apply. Players may hold more than one non-FIFA nationality.

No.	Pos.	Nation	Player
3	DF	JPN	Ryo Tadokoro (retired)
9	FW	JPN	Akira Toshima (on loan to (Japan) Omiya Ardija)
14	DF	JPN	Kengo Kitazume (to (Japan) Kashiwa Reysol)
24	MF	JPN	Kazuhito Watanabe (to (Japan) Ehime FC)
29	MF	JPN	Ryotaro Yamamoto (to (Japan) YSCC Yokohama)
30	FW	JPN	Ayumu Tachibana (to (Australia) Preston Lions FC)
31	GK	JPN	Issei Ouchi (on loan to (Japan) YSCC Yokohama)
36	GK	JPN	Shugo Tsuji (to (Japan) Ehime FC)
—	DF	JPN	Daichi Inui (to (Japan) Matsumoto Yamaga)
—	MF	JPN	Yuki Ueda (to (Japan) Kochi United SC, previously on loan)
—	MF	JPN	Yota Maejima (on loan to (Japan) Mito HollyHock)
