= 2019 Shimizu S-Pulse season =

Shimizu S-Pulse
2019 season
- Chairman: Shigeo Hidaritomo
- Manager: Jan Jönsson
- Stadium: IAI Stadium Nihondaira
- Average home league attendance: 14,991
Home colours	Away colours

The 2019 Shimizu S-Pulse season saw the team competing in the J1 League, they finished 8th in the 2018 J1 League. They also competed in the J.League Cup, and the Emperor's Cup.

== Squad ==
As of 30 January 2019.

Note: Flags indicate national team as defined under FIFA eligibility rules; some limited exceptions apply. Players may hold more than one non-FIFA nationality.

No.	Pos.	Nation	Player
1	GK	JPN	Yohei Nishibe
2	DF	JPN	Yugo Tatsuta
3	DF	KOR	Hwang Seok-Ho
5	DF	JPN	Shoma Kamata
6	MF	JPN	Ryo Takeuchi
7	MF	JPN	Mitsunari Musaka
8	MF	JPN	Hideki Ishige
9	FW	PRK	Jong Tae-se (Captain)
13	GK	JPN	Yuji Rokutan
14	MF	JPN	Jumpei Kusukami
15	MF	JPN	Takuma Mizutani
16	MF	JPN	Kenta Nishizawa
17	MF	JPN	Yosuke Kawai
18	DF	BRA	Elsinho
19	FW	JPN	Jin Hiratsuka

No.	Pos.	Nation	Player
20	MF	JPN	Keita Nakamura
21	GK	JPN	Toru Takagiwa
22	MF	BRA	Renato Augusto
23	FW	JPN	Koya Kitagawa
25	DF	JPN	Ko Matsubara
26	DF	JPN	Hiroshi Futami
27	DF	JPN	Takahiro Iida
30	FW	JPN	Shota Kaneko
31	GK	JPN	Togo Umeda
33	DF	BRA	Wanderson (on loan from Atlético Paranaense)
34	MF	JPN	Yuta Taki
35	DF	JPN	Kenta Ito
36	MF	JPN	Yasufumi Nishimura
37	FW	JPN	Daigo Takahashi
49	FW	BRA	Douglas

== Competitions ==
=== J1 League ===
==== Results ====
23 February 2019 1	Sanfrecce Hiroshima	1 – 1	Shimizu S-Pulse	EDION Stadium
14:03 JST	Salomonsson 57'	Report	Kitagawa 30'; Hwang (yellow card) 36'	Attendance: 14,084; Referee: Yusuke Araki

2 March 2019 2	Shimizu S-Pulse	2 – 4	Gamba Osaka	IAI Stadium Nihondaira
14:03 JST	Nakamura 17'; Taki 90+7'	Report	Onose 29'; Ademilson 58', 69'; Hwang 73'	Attendance: 15,820; Referee: Nobutsugu Murakami

9 March 2019 3	Hokkaido Consadole Sapporo	5 – 2	Shimizu S-Pulse	Sapporo Dome
14:03 JST	Suzuki 19'; Anderson Lopes 45+2' (pen.), 49', 65', 69'	Report	Matsubara 36'; Taki 83'	Attendance: 22,692; Referee: Masaaki Iemoto Toma

17 March 2019 4	Vissel Kobe	v	Shimizu S-Pulse
		Report

=== J. League Cup ===
==== Group stage ====
Pos	Team	Pld	W	D	L	GF	GA	GD	Pts	GAM	JUB	SSP	YAM
1	Gamba Osaka	6	3	2	1	10	5	+5	11	—	4–1	3–1	2–1
2	Jubilo Iwata	6	3	0	3	6	8	−2	9	1–0	—	0–2	1–0
3	Shimizu S-Pulse	6	2	2	2	8	8	0	8	1–1	1–0	—	2–2
4	Matsumoto Yamaga F.C.	6	1	2	3	6	9	−3	5	0–0	1–3	2–1	—

Source: League table, Match results
