= 2018 Shimizu S-Pulse season =

Shimizu S-Pulse
2018 season
- Manager: Jan Jönsson
- Stadium: IAI Stadium Nihondaira
- J1 League: 8th
Home colours	Away colours

2018 Shimizu S-Pulse season.

== Squad ==
As of 10 July 2019.

Note: Flags indicate national team as defined under FIFA eligibility rules; some limited exceptions apply. Players may hold more than one non-FIFA nationality.

No.	Pos.	Nation	Player
1	GK	JPN	Yohei Nishibe
2	DF	JPN	Yugo Tatsuta
3	DF	KOR	Hwang Seok-Ho
5	DF	JPN	Shoma Kamata
6	MF	JPN	Ryo Takeuchi
7	MF	JPN	Mitsunari Musaka
8	MF	JPN	Hideki Ishige
9	FW	PRK	Jong Tae-se (Captain)
11	FW	BRA	Junior Dutra
13	GK	JPN	Yuji Rokutan
14	MF	JPN	Jumpei Kusukami
15	MF	JPN	Takuma Mizutani
16	MF	JPN	Kenta Nishizawa
17	MF	JPN	Yosuke Kawai
18	DF	BRA	Elsinho
19	FW	JPN	Jin Hiratsuka
20	MF	JPN	Keita Nakamura
21	GK	JPN	Toru Takagiwa

No.	Pos.	Nation	Player
22	MF	BRA	Renato Augusto
23	FW	JPN	Koya Kitagawa
25	DF	JPN	Ko Matsubara
26	DF	JPN	Hiroshi Futami
27	DF	JPN	Takahiro Iida
30	FW	JPN	Shota Kaneko
31	GK	JPN	Togo Umeda
34	MF	JPN	Yuta Taki
35	DF	JPN	Kenta Ito
37	FW	JPN	Daigo Takahashi
46	FW	JPN	Riyo Kawamoto (Type 2 player)
47	MF	JPN	Kaito Igarashi (Type 2 player)
48	MF	JPN	Taichi Aoshima (Type 2 player)
49	FW	BRA	Douglas
50	MF	JPN	Hikaru Naruoka (Type 2 player)
51	FW	JPN	Ryosuke Yamazaki (Type 2 player)

Note: The official club website lists the club mascot as player #0 and the supporters as player #12.

=== Out on loan ===
Note: Flags indicate national team as defined under FIFA eligibility rules; some limited exceptions apply. Players may hold more than one non-FIFA nationality.

No.	Pos.	Nation	Player
36	MF	JPN	Yasufumi Nishimura (on loan to Fagiano Okayama)
—	GK	JPN	Yoshiaki Arai (on loan to Zweigen Kanazawa)
—	DF	JPN	Kohei Shimizu (on loan to Sanfrecce Hiroshima)

No.	Pos.	Nation	Player
—	MF	JPN	Chikashi Masuda (on loan to Seoul E-Land FC)
—	MF	JPN	Kota Miyamoto (on loan to FC Gifu)

== J1 League ==
Match	Date	Team	Score	Team	Venue	Attendance
1	2018.02.25	Shimizu S-Pulse	0-0	Kashima Antlers	IAI Stadium Nihondaira	19,632
2	2018.03.03	Vissel Kobe	2-4	Shimizu S-Pulse	Noevir Stadium Kobe	24,058
3	2018.03.10	Hokkaido Consadole Sapporo	1-3	Shimizu S-Pulse	Sapporo Dome	19,390
4	2018.03.18	Shimizu S-Pulse	1-1	Vegalta Sendai	IAI Stadium Nihondaira	13,965
5	2018.03.31	Shimizu S-Pulse	0-1	Yokohama F. Marinos	IAI Stadium Nihondaira	17,032
6	2018.04.07	Júbilo Iwata	0-0	Shimizu S-Pulse	Shizuoka Stadium	30,598
7	2018.04.11	Shimizu S-Pulse	0-1	V-Varen Nagasaki	IAI Stadium Nihondaira	6,193
8	2018.04.15	Urawa Reds	2-1	Shimizu S-Pulse	Saitama Stadium 2002	28,295
9	2018.04.21	Shimizu S-Pulse	0-1	FC Tokyo	IAI Stadium Nihondaira	12,615
10	2018.04.25	Nagoya Grampus	1-3	Shimizu S-Pulse	Paloma Mizuho Stadium	9,774
11	2018.04.28	Shimizu S-Pulse	2-1	Kashiwa Reysol	IAI Stadium Nihondaira	13,100
12	2018.05.02	Sanfrecce Hiroshima	2-0	Shimizu S-Pulse	Edion Stadium Hiroshima	8,029
13	2018.05.06	Sagan Tosu	3-1	Shimizu S-Pulse	Best Amenity Stadium	14,103
14	2018.05.12	Shimizu S-Pulse	4-2	Shonan Bellmare	IAI Stadium Nihondaira	14,624
15	2018.05.20	Kawasaki Frontale	3-0	Shimizu S-Pulse	Kawasaki Todoroki Stadium	23,969
16	2018.07.18	Shimizu S-Pulse	3-0	Cerezo Osaka	IAI Stadium Nihondaira	9,782
17	2018.07.22	Gamba Osaka	1-2	Shimizu S-Pulse	Panasonic Stadium Suita	17,542
19	2018.08.01	Shimizu S-Pulse	1-0	Sagan Tosu	IAI Stadium Nihondaira	14,307
20	2018.08.05	Kashima Antlers	1-0	Shimizu S-Pulse	Kashima Soccer Stadium	19,119
21	2018.08.11	Shimizu S-Pulse	1-2	Kawasaki Frontale	IAI Stadium Nihondaira	18,129
22	2018.08.15	Cerezo Osaka	3-1	Shimizu S-Pulse	Kincho Stadium	14,628
23	2018.08.19	Shimizu S-Pulse	3-3	Urawa Reds	IAI Stadium Nihondaira	14,914
24	2018.08.25	Shimizu S-Pulse	1-2	Hokkaido Consadole Sapporo	IAI Stadium Nihondaira	13,649
18	2018.08.29	Yokohama F. Marinos	1-2	Shimizu S-Pulse	Nissan Stadium	15,645
25	2018.09.01	Vegalta Sendai	2-1	Shimizu S-Pulse	Yurtec Stadium Sendai	14,293
26	2018.09.15	Kashiwa Reysol	2-3	Shimizu S-Pulse	Sankyo Frontier Kashiwa Stadium	11,105
27	2018.09.21	Shimizu S-Pulse	1-2	Gamba Osaka	IAI Stadium Nihondaira	14,790
28	2018.09.29	FC Tokyo	0-2	Shimizu S-Pulse	Ajinomoto Stadium	33,789
29	2018.10.07	Shimizu S-Pulse	5-1	Júbilo Iwata	IAI Stadium Nihondaira	19,159
30	2018.10.20	Shimizu S-Pulse	2-0	Sanfrecce Hiroshima	IAI Stadium Nihondaira	14,870
31	2018.11.02	Shonan Bellmare	0-0	Shimizu S-Pulse	Shonan BMW Stadium Hiratsuka	14,354
32	2018.11.10	Shimizu S-Pulse	2-0	Nagoya Grampus	IAI Stadium Nihondaira	17,974
33	2018.11.24	Shimizu S-Pulse	3-3	Vissel Kobe	IAI Stadium Nihondaira	20,109
34	2018.12.01	V-Varen Nagasaki	4-4	Shimizu S-Pulse	Transcosmos Stadium Nagasaki	12,198
