= Hiratsuka (surname) =

Hiratsuka (written: 平塚 or 平墳) is a Japanese surname. Notable people with the surname include:

- Jin Hiratsuka (平墳 迅, born 1999), Japanese footballer
- Raichō Hiratsuka (平塚 らいちょう, 1886–1971), Japanese writer, journalist and activist
- Tetsuji Hiratsuka (平塚 哲二, born 1971), Japanese golfer
- Un'ichi Hiratsuka (平塚 運一, 1895–1997), Japanese printmaker
- Yuto Hiratsuka (平塚 悠知, born 1996), Japanese footballer
