= Himeno =

Himeno (written: 姫野) is a Japanese surname.

== People with the surname ==
- Kaoruko Himeno (姫野 カオルコ; born 1958), Japanese writer
- Kazuki Himeno (姫野 一樹; born 1994), Japanese rugby union player
- Michi Himeno (姫野 美智; born 1956), Japanese animator and character designer
- Yuya Himeno (姫野 宥弥; born 1996), Japanese footballer

== Fictional characters ==
- Himeno (姫野), a character from the Chainsaw Man anime and manga series
