= Kunitomo Suzuki =

Japanese footballer

Kunitomo Suzuki 鈴木 国友
Personal information
- Full name: Kunitomo Suzuki
- Date of birth: July 13, 1995 (age 31)
- Place of birth: Kanagawa, Japan
- Height: 1.86 m (6 ft 1 in)
- Position: Forward

Team information
- Current team: Tochigi City FC
- Number: 40

Youth career
- SSC
- –2010: Shonan Bellmare
- 2011–2013: Soyo High School

College career
| Years | Team | Apps | (Gls) |
| 2014–2017 | Toin University of Yokohama | | |

Senior career*
| Years | Team | Apps | (Gls) |
| 2018–2020 | Shonan Bellmare | 8 | (0) |
| 2019 | → Gainare Tottori (loan) | 14 | (3) |
| 2020 | → Giravanz Kitakyushu (loan) | 41 | (6) |
| 2021–2024 | Matsumoto Yamaga | 61 | (8) |
| 2022 | Montedio Yamagata (Loan) | 14 | (1) |
| 2022–2023 | Thespa Gunma (Loan) | 11 | (0) |
| 2024– | Tochigi City FC | 43 | (8) |
Medal record
Shonan Bellmare
| Winner | J.League Cup | 2018 |
- * Club domestic league appearances and goals as of 1 January 2026

Kunitomo Suzuki (鈴木 国友, Suzuki Kunitomo; born July 13, 1995) is a Japanese football player for Matsumoto Yamaga FC.

== Career ==
Graduated at Toin University of Yokohama, Suzuki came back to the Kanagawa-based club Shonan Bellmare, to play in the top team in November 2017, returning there for the first time since playing for them on their U-15 team.

== Career statistics ==
Updated to 18 February 2019.

Appearances and goals by club, season and competition
| Club | Season | League | | | Emperor's Cup | | J.League Cup | | Total | |
| Club | Season | Division | Apps | Goals | Apps | Goals | Apps | Goals | Apps | Goals |
|---|---|---|---|---|---|---|---|---|---|---|
| Shonan Bellmare | 2018 | J1 League | 5 | 0 | 2 | 0 | 3 | 1 | 9 | 1 |
| Total | | | 5 | 0 | 2 | 0 | 3 | 1 | 9 | 1 |
