= Kenta Hori =

Japanese footballer

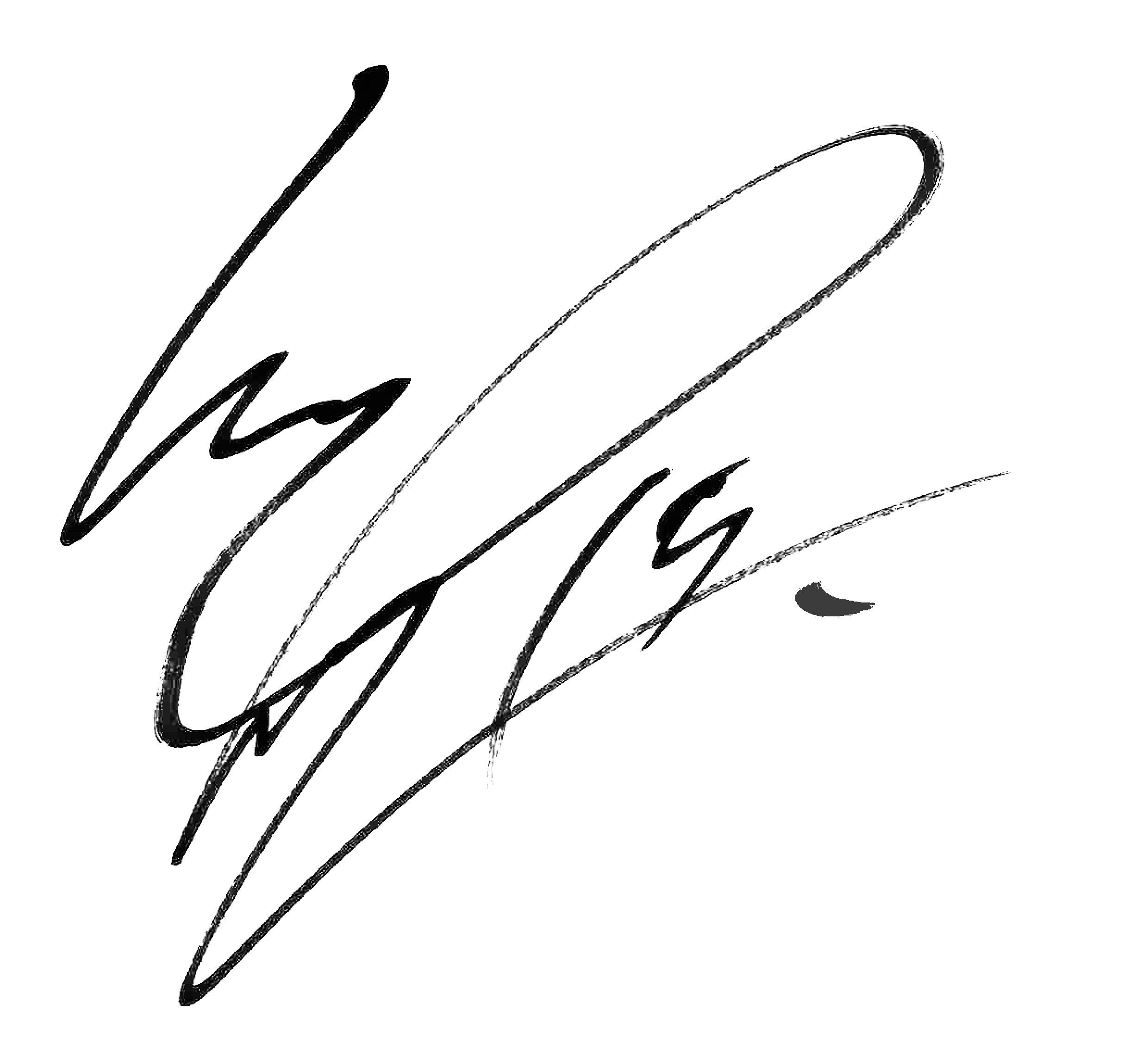

Personal information
- Date of birth: 9 April 1999 (age 27)
- Place of birth: Kanagawa, Japan
- Height: 1.62 m (5 ft 4 in)
- Position: Midfielder

Team information
- Current team: Verspah Oita

Youth career
- Azamino FC
- –2017: Yokohama F. Marinos

Senior career*
Years	Team	Apps	(Gls)
2018–2019	Yokohama F. Marinos	0	(0)
2019-2020	→ Blaublitz Akita (loan)	12	(0)
2020-2021	ReinMeer Aomori	5	(0)
2021–2023	Fujieda MYFC	1	(0)
2023-2024	Veroskronos Tsuno	23	(7)
2024-	Verspah Oita	13	(1)

International career
2015	Japan U16		
2016	Japan U17	1	(1)
2017	Japan U18	2	(2)
2018	Japan U19		
2019	Japan U20		
- * Club domestic league appearances and goals as of 14:57, 13 July 2021 (UTC)

Kenta Hori (堀 研太, Hori Kenta; born 9 April 1999) is a Japanese footballer currently playing as a midfielder for Fujieda MYFC.

== Career statistics ==
=== Club ===
As of 13 July 2021.

Club	Season	League			National Cup		League Cup		Other		Total	
Club	Season	Division	Apps	Goals	Apps	Goals	Apps	Goals	Apps	Goals	Apps	Goals
Yokohama F. Marinos	2019	J1 League	0	0	0	0	0	0	0	0	0	0
Blaublitz Akita (loan)	2019	J3 League	12	0	0	0	0	0	0	0	12	0
ReinMeer Aomori	2020	JFL	5	0	4 (Note: Appearances in the Emperor's Cup)	1	–		0	0	9	1
Fujieda MYFC	2021	J3 League	1	0	0	0	–		0	0	1	0
Career total			18	0	4	1	0	0	0	0	22	1
