= Kota Yamada =

Japanese association football player

Kota Yamada 山田 康太
Personal information
- Full name: Kota Yamada
- Date of birth: 10 July 1999 (age 27)
- Place of birth: Kanagawa, Japan
- Height: 1.72 m (5 ft 8 in)
- Position: Midfielder

Team information
- Current team: Yokohama FC
- Number: 7

Youth career
- 2015–2017: Yokohama F. Marinos

Senior career*
Years	Team	Apps	(Gls)
2017–2021	Yokohama F. Marinos	9	(1)
2019	→ Nagoya Grampus (loan)	0	(0)
2020	→ Mito HollyHock (loan)	35	(3)
2021	→ Montedio Yamagata (loan)	42	(8)
2022	Montedio Yamagata	37	(6)
2023	Kashiwa Reysol	3	(0)
2024–2025	Gamba Osaka	23	(4)
2025–	Yokohama FC	51	(2)

International career
2018	Japan U19	3	(0)
2020	Japan U20	4	(1)
Medal record
Yokohama F. Marinos
Runner-up	J.League Cup	2018
Runner-up	Emperor's Cup	2017
Representing Japan
AFC U-19 Championship
Bronze medal – third place	2018
- * Club domestic league appearances and goals as of 14 August 2026

Kota Yamada (山田 康太, Yamada Kōta; born 10 July 1999) is a Japanese footballer who plays as a midfielder for Yokohama FC.

== Career ==
=== Yokohama F.Marinos ===
Yamada played in the J.League Cup during his first season. On 14 September 2017, Yamada was promoted to the first team from the 2018 season. He made his J1 league debut on 28 April 2018, starting against Kashima Antlers. On 5 June 2018, Yamada signed a professional A contract after playing enough minutes. He scored his first league goal against FC Tokyo on 22 July 2018, scoring in the 89th minute. On 25 December 2018, the club extended Yamada's contract for the 2019 season.

=== Loan to Nagoya Grampus ===
On 13 August 2019, Yamada joined Nagoya Grampus on loan for the rest of the season.

=== Loan to Mito HollyHock ===
On 26 December 2019, Yamada joined Mito HollyHock on a one year loan.

=== Loan to Montedio Yamagata ===
On 24 December 2020, Yamada joined Montedio Yamagata on a one year loan. On 26 June 2021, Yamada won the J2 Goal of the Month for June for his 9th minute goal against Zweigen Kanazawa.

=== Montedio Yamagata ===
On 24 December 2021, Yamada joined Montedio Yamagata permanently. On 17 April 2022, Yamada won the J2 Goal of the Month for April for his 35th minute goal against FC Machida Zelvia.

=== Kashiwa Reysol ===
On 24 November 2022, Yamada was announced at Kashiwa Reysol.

=== Gamba Osaka ===
Yamada was announced at Gamba Osaka on 29 December 2023.

== International career ==
Yamada was called up to the Japan U-19 squad for the 2018 AFC U-19 Championship on 2 October 2018.

In March 2019, Yamada was called up to the Japan U-20 squad for a U-20 Japan National Team's European tour, but had to pull out due to poor health.

Yamada was called up to the Japan U20 squad for the 2019 FIFA U-20 World Cup. During the competition, he scored against Ecuador U20s on 23 May 2019, scoring in the 68th minute.

== Career statistics ==
As of 6 March 2023.

Appearances and goals by club, season and competition
Club	Season	League			Emperor's Cup		J.League Cup		Total	
Club	Season	Division	Apps	Goals	Apps	Goals	Apps	Goals	Apps	Goals
Yokohama F. Marinos	2017	J1 League	0	0	1	0	2	0	3	0
Yokohama F. Marinos	2018	J1 League	8	1	0	0	7	0	15	1
Yokohama F. Marinos	2019	J1 League	1	0	1	0	5	0	7	0
Yokohama F. Marinos	Total		9	1	2	0	14	0	25	1
Nagoya Grampus (loan)	2019	J1 League	0	0	0	0	0	0	0	0
Mito Hollyhock (loan)	2020	J2 League	35	3	0	0	–		35	3
Montedio Yamagata (loan)	2021	J2 League	42	8	1	0	–		43	8
Montedio Yamagata	2022	J2 League	37 (Note: Includes J1/J2 play-offs)	6	0	0	–		37	6
Kashiwa Reysol	2023	J1 League	3	0	0	0	0	0	3	0
Career total			126	18	3	0	14	0	143	18
