= Haruki Saruta =

Japanese footballer

Personal information
- Full name: Haruki Saruta
- Date of birth: 23 April 1999 (age 27)
- Place of birth: Nerima, Tokyo, Japan
- Height: 1.91 m (6 ft 3 in)
- Position: Goalkeeper

Team information
- Current team: Kashiwa Reysol
- Number: 1

Youth career
- FC Ohizumi Gakuen
- Yokogawa Musashino
- –2017: Kashiwa Reysol

Senior career*
Years	Team	Apps	(Gls)
2018–	Kashiwa Reysol	0	(0)
2019	→ Kagoshima United FC (loan)	0	(0)
2020	→ Gamba Osaka U-23 (loan)	2	(0)
2021	→ Yokohama FC (loan)	0	(0)

International career^{‡}
2016	Japan U17	1	(0)
2017	Japan U18		
- * Club domestic league appearances and goals as of 01:13, 10 November 2024 (UTC) ‡ National team caps and goals as of 17:04, 17 March 2021 (UTC)

Haruki Saruta (猿田 遥己, Saruta Haruki; born 23 April 1999) is a Japanese footballer currently playing as a goalkeeper for Kashiwa Reysol.

== Career ==
On 14 September 2017, Saruta was promoted to Kashiwa Reysol's first team from the 2018 season. He made his debut against Tokushima Vortis in the Emperor's Cup on 22 June 2022.

On 6 August 2019, Saruta joined Kagoshima United on loan.

On 29 December 2019, Saruta joined Gamba Osaka on loan. During his time at the club, he didn't make any appearances for Gamba's first team.

Saruta made his league debut for Gamba Osaka U-23 against Kamatamare Sanuki on 28 June 2020.

On 5 January 2021, Saruta joined Yokohama FC on loan. On 23 December 2021, it was announced that he would return to Kashiwa Reysol.

== Career statistics ==
=== Club ===
As of 19 April 2023.

Club	Season	League			National Cup		League Cup		Other		Total	
Club	Season	Division	Apps	Goals	Apps	Goals	Apps	Goals	Apps	Goals	Apps	Goals
Kashiwa Reysol	2019	J1 League	0	0	0	0	0	0	–		0	0
Kashiwa Reysol	2020	J1 League	0	0	–		0	0	–		0	0
Kashiwa Reysol	2022	J1 League	0	0	1	0	0	0	–		1	0
Kashiwa Reysol	2023	J1 League	0	0	0	0	1	0	–		1	0
Kashiwa Reysol	Total		0	0	1	0	1	0	0	0	2	0
Kagoshima United FC (loan)	2019	J2 League	0	0	0	0	0	0	–		0	0
Gamba Osaka U-23 (loan)	2020	J3 League	2	0	–		–		–		2	0
Yokohama FC (loan)	2021	J1 League	0	0	0	0	0	0	–		0	0
Career total			2	0	1	0	1	0	0	0	4	0
