= Yuya Himeno =

Japanese footballer

Yuya Himeno 姫野 宥弥
Personal information
- Full name: Yuya Himeno
- Date of birth: 27 September 1996 (age 30)
- Place of birth: Ōita, Japan
- Height: 1.64 m (5 ft 5 in)
- Position: Midfielder

Team information
- Current team: Vanraure Hachinohe

Youth career
- 2012–2014: Oita Trinita

Senior career*
Years	Team	Apps	(Gls)
2015–2020	Oita Trinita	37	(0)
2015	→ Verspah Oita (loan)	9	(0)
2019	→ Thespakusatsu Gunma (loan)	19	(1)
2020	→ Fujieda MYFC (loan)	34	(3)
2021–2022	Kataller Toyama	28	(3)
2023–	Vanraure Hachinohe	0	(0)
- * Club domestic league appearances and goals as of 20 December 2022, 18:43 (UTC)

Yuya Himeno (姫野 宥弥, Himeno Yūya; born 27 September 1996 in Ōita, Ōita) is a Japanese footballer who currently plays for Vanraure Hachinohe.

== Career ==
On 14 January 2021, Himeno announcement officially permanent transfer to Kataller Toyama for 2021 season. He leave from the club in 2022 after two years at Toyama.

On 24 December 2022, Himeno joined to J3 club, Vanraure Hachinohe for upcoming 2023 season.

== Career statistics ==
Updated to the end 2022 season.

=== Club ===
Club performance			League		Cup		Total	
Season	Club	League	Apps	Goals	Apps	Goals	Apps	Goals
Japan			League		Emperor's Cup		Total	
2015	Oita Trinita	J2 League	2	0	1	0	3	0
2015	Verspah Oita	JFL	9	0	0	0	9	0
2016	Oita Trinita	J3 League	19	0	1	0	20	0
2017	Oita Trinita	J2 League	12	0	2	1	14	1
2018	Oita Trinita	J2 League	4	0	1	0	5	0
2019	Thespakusatsu Gunma (loan)	J3 League	19	1	2	0	21	1
2020	Fujieda MYFC (loan)	J3 League	34	3	0	0	34	3
2021	Kataller Toyama	J3 League	28	3	2	1	30	4
2022	Kataller Toyama	J3 League	23	2	2	0	25	2
2023	Vanraure Hachinohe	J3 League	0	0	0	0	0	0
Career total			150	9	11	2	161	11

== Honours ==
Oita Trinita

- J3 League: 2016
