= Hwang Seok-ho =

South Korean footballer

Hwang Seok-ho 황석호
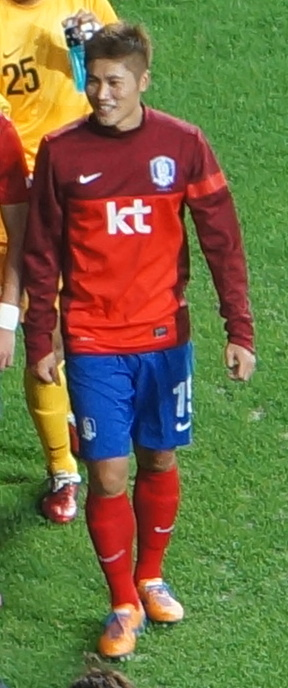
- Hwang with South Korea in 2013

Personal information
- Date of birth: 27 June 1989 (age 37)
- Place of birth: Cheongju, Chungcheongbuk-do, South Korea
- Height: 1.83 m (6 ft 0 in)
- Positions: Centre back; full back

Youth career
- 2008–2011: Daegu University

Senior career*
Years	Team	Apps	(Gls)
2012–2014	Sanfrecce Hiroshima	56	(3)
2015–2017	Kashima Antlers	36	(0)
2017	Tianjin Teda	15	(0)
2018–2021	Shimizu S-Pulse	77	(3)
2021–2023	Sagan Tosu	71	(5)
2024–2025	Ulsan HD	21	(0)
2025	Suwon Samsung Bluewings	13	(0)

International career^{‡}
2011–2012	South Korea U-23	8	(0)
2012–2014	South Korea	4	(0)
Medal record
Olympic Games
Bronze medal – third place	2012 London	Team
- * Club domestic league appearances and goals as of 6 January 2026 ‡ National team caps and goals as of 18 June 2014

- Hwang Seok-ho
- Hangul: 황석호
- Hanja: 黃錫鎬
- RR: Hwang Seokho
- MR: Hwang Sŏkho

Hwang Seok-ho (Korean: 황석호, born 27 June 1989) is a South Korean former professional footballer who plays as a centre back. He won a bronze medal with the Korean men's football team at the 2012 Summer Olympics.

On 20 March 2026, Hwang decided to retire from professional football.

== Club statistics ==
As of match played 28 May 2025.

Appearances and goals by club, season and competition
Club	Season	League			Cup		League Cup		Continental		Other (Note: Includes J. League Championship, FIFA Club World Cup and Japanese Super Cup.)		Total	
Club	Season	Division	Apps	Goals	Apps	Goals	Apps	Goals	Apps	Goals	Apps	Goals	Apps	Goals
Sanfrecce Hiroshima	2012	J1 League	18	0	0	0	4	0	—		3	0	25	0
Sanfrecce Hiroshima	2013	J1 League	26	3	2	0	0	0	3	0	—		31	3
Sanfrecce Hiroshima	2014	J1 League	12	0	1	0	3	0	5	1	1	0	22	1
Sanfrecce Hiroshima	Total		56	3	3	0	7	0	8	1	4	0	78	4
Kashima Antlers	2015	J1 League	24	0	0	0	4	1	5	0	—		33	1
Kashima Antlers	2016	J1 League	12	0	3	0	1	0	—		2	0	18	1
Kashima Antlers	Total		36	0	3	0	5	1	5	0	2	0	51	2
Tianjin Teda	2017	Chinese Super League	15	0	0	0	—		—		—		15	0
Shimizu S-Pulse	2018	J1 League	32	1	1	0	0	0	—		—		33	1
Shimizu S-Pulse	2019	J1 League	26	0	4	0	1	0	—		—		31	0
Shimizu S-Pulse	2020	J1 League	19	2	—		0	0	—		—		19	2
Shimizu S-Pulse	Total		77	3	5	0	1	0	—		—		83	3
Sagan Tosu	2021	J1 League	28	0	1	0	0	0	—		—		29	0
Sagan Tosu	2022	J1 League	25	4	0	0	2	0	—		—		27	4
Sagan Tosu	2023	J1 League	18	1	1	1	1	0	—		—		20	2
Sagan Tosu	Total		71	5	2	1	3	0	—		—		76	6
Ulsan HD	2024	K League 1	18	0	2	0	—		11	0	—		31	0
Ulsan HD	2025	K League 1	3	0	0	0	—		—		—		3	0
Ulsan HD	Total		21	0	2	0	—		11	0	—		34	0
Total			276	11	15	1	16	1	24	1	6	0	337	14

== Honours ==
=== Club ===
Sanfrecce Hiroshima

- J1 League Champions (2) : 2012, 2013
- Japanese Super Cup Winners (1) : 2014

Kashima Antlers

- J1 League Champions (1) : 2016
- Emperor's Cup Winners (1) : 2016
- J. League Cup Winners (1) : 2015

Ulsan HD

- K League 1 Champions (1) : 2024
