= Keita Nakamura (footballer) =

Japanese footballer (born 1993)

Keita Nakamura 中村 慶太
Personal information
- Date of birth: 30 June 1993 (age 33)
- Place of birth: Chiba, Japan
- Height: 1.78 m (5 ft 10 in)
- Position: Attacking midfielder

Team information
- Current team: V-Varen Nagasaki
- Number: 20

Youth career
- 2009–2011: RKU Kashiwa High School

College career
Years	Team	Apps	(Gls)
2012–2015	Ryutsu Keizai University		

Senior career*
Years	Team	Apps	(Gls)
2016–2018	V-Varen Nagasaki	91	(17)
2019–2021	Shimizu S-Pulse	64	(3)
2022–2023	Kashiwa Reysol	15	(0)
2023–	V-Varen Nagasaki	33	(5)
- * Club domestic league appearances and goals as of 11 August 2026

Keita Nakamura (中村 慶太, Nakamura Keita; born 30 June 1993) is a Japanese professional footballer who plays as an attacking midfielder for J1 League club V-Varen Nagasaki.

== Career statistics ==
As of 28 July 2023

Appearances and goals by club, season and competition
Club	Season	League			Emperor's Cup		J. League Cup		Total	
Club	Season	Division	Apps	Goals	Apps	Goals	Apps	Goals	Apps	Goals
V-Varen Nagasaki	2016	J2 League	27	2	1	0	–		28	2
V-Varen Nagasaki	2017	J2 League	37	8	0	0	–		37	8
V-Varen Nagasaki	2018	J1 League	27	7	1	0	2	2	30	9
V-Varen Nagasaki	Total		91	17	2	0	2	2	95	19
Shimizu S-Pulse	2019	J1 League	21	1	2	0	1	0	24	1
Shimizu S-Pulse	2020	J1 League	25	1	0	0	1	0	26	1
Shimizu S-Pulse	2021	J1 League	18	1	1	0	6	0	25	1
Shimizu S-Pulse	Total		64	3	3	0	8	0	75	3
Kashiwa Reysol	2022	J1 League	12	0	2	0	2	0	16	0
Kashiwa Reysol	2023	J1 League	3	0	1	1	2	0	6	1
Kashiwa Reysol	Total		15	0	3	1	4	0	22	1
V-Varen Nagasaki	2023	J2 League	1	0	0	0	–		1	0
Career total			171	20	8	1	14	2	193	23
