= Takahiro Iida =

Japanese footballer (born 1994)

Takahiro Iida 飯田 貴敬
Personal information
- Full name: Takahiro Iida
- Date of birth: August 31, 1994 (age 32)
- Place of birth: Sakuragawa, Ibaraki, Japan
- Height: 1.80 m (5 ft 11 in)
- Position: Right back

Team information
- Current team: JEF United Chiba
- Number: 22

Youth career
- 2002–2006: Makabe Junior FC
- 2007–2009: Shimodate Nishi Junior High School
- 2010–2012: Yasu High School

College career
Years	Team	Apps	(Gls)
2013–2016	Senshu University		

Senior career*
Years	Team	Apps	(Gls)
2017–2019	Shimizu S-Pulse	27	(0)
2020–2023	Kyoto Sanga	79	(1)
2023	Omiya Ardija	12	(0)
2024	Ventforet Kofu (Loan)	23	(2)
2025–2026	Mito HollyHock	50	(1)
2026–	JEF United Chiba	1	(0)
- * Club domestic league appearances and goals as of 12 August 2026

Takahiro Iida (飯田 貴敬, Iida Takahiro; born August 31, 1994) is a Japanese footballer. He plays for J1 League club JEF United Chiba.

== Career ==
Takahiro Iida joined J1 League club Shimizu S-Pulse in 2017.

== Club statistics ==
Updated to 20 July 2022.

Club performance			League		Cup		League Cup		Total	
Season	Club	League	Apps	Goals	Apps	Goals	Apps	Goals	Apps	Goals
Japan			League		Emperor's Cup		J.League Cup		Total	
2017	Shimizu S-Pulse	J1 League	1	0	1	0	5	0	7	0
2018	Shimizu S-Pulse	J1 League	15	0	0	0	1	0	16	0
2019	Shimizu S-Pulse	J1 League	11	0	2	0	3	0	16	0
2020	Kyoto Sanga	J2 League	37	0	–		–		37	0
2021	Kyoto Sanga	J2 League	36	1	0	0	–		36	1
2022	Kyoto Sanga	J1 League	5	0	2	0	5	0	12	0
Total			105	1	5	0	14	0	124	1
