= Jin Hiratsuka =

Japanese footballer

Jin Hiratsuka 平墳 迅
Personal information
- Full name: Jin Hiratsuka
- Date of birth: May 19, 1999 (age 27)
- Place of birth: Ōgaki, Japan
- Height: 1.80 m (5 ft 11 in)
- Position: Forward

Youth career
- 2015–2017: Shimizu S-Pulse Youth

Senior career*
Years	Team	Apps	(Gls)
2017–2020	Shimizu S-Pulse	0	(0)
2020	→ Fujieda MYFC (loan)	0	(0)
2021	Suzuka Point Getters	8	(0)
2022	ReinMeer Aomori	10	(2)
Total		18	(2)
- * Club domestic league appearances and goals

Jin Hiratsuka (平墳 迅, Hiratsuka Jin; born May 19, 1999) is a Japanese former football player who played as a forward.

== Early life ==
Hiratsuka was born in Gifu Prefecture.

== Career ==
=== Youth club career ===
As a youth player, Hiratsuka joined JUVEN FC. During junior high school, Hiratsuka played for Gifu VAMOS, the team that produced 2013 FIFA U-17 World Cup player Taro Sugimoto, and was selected for the prefecture team. After failing a trial with the youth academy of J1 League club Nagoya Grampus and receiving an invitation from a private school in Shizuoka Prefecture, he joined the youth academy of J1 League club Shimizu S-Pulse after a trial, initially struggling with the level of play.

=== Senior club career ===
Jin Hiratsuka joined J1 League club Shimizu S-Pulse in 2017. On 12 April 2017, he debuted for Shimizu S-Pulse during a 0–1 loss to Consadole Sapporo. He made three appearances for Shimizu S-Pulse. On 13 December 2020, the club announced it would not be renewing his contract for the 2021 season.

In 2020, he was sent on loan to Fujieda MYFC in the J3 League, becoming the youngest player on the team. On 12 December 2020, his loan with the club expired.

In 2021, he signed for Suzuka Point Getters but left at the end of the 2021 season.

In 2022, he signed for ReinMeer Aomori. On 25 November 2022, ReinMeer Aomori announced he would be leaving the club after his contract expired.

=== International career ===
He has been selected by Japan at Under-18 level.

== Style of play ==
Hiratsuka is left-footed and known for his goalscoring ability as well as height.

== Club statistics ==
Appearances and goals by club, season and competition
Club	Season	League			National cup (Note: Includes Emperor's Cup)		League cup (Note: Includes J.League Cup)		Total	
Club	Season	Division	Apps	Goals	Apps	Goals	Apps	Goals	Apps	Goals
Shimizu S-Pulse	2017	J1 League	0	0	0	0	1	0	1	0
Shimizu S-Pulse	2018	J1 League	0	0	0	0	0	0	0	0
Shimizu S-Pulse	2019	J1 League	0	0	0	0	0	0	0	0
Shimizu S-Pulse	2020	J1 League	0	0	0	0	2	0	2	0
Shimizu S-Pulse	Total		0	0	0	0	3	0	3	0
Fujieda MYFC (loan)	2020	J3 League	0	0	–		–		0	0
Suzuka Point Getters	2021	JFL	8	0	1	0	–		9	0
ReinMeer Aomori	2022	JFL	10	2	–		–		10	2
Career total			18	2	1	0	3	0	22	2
