= Shoma Kamata =

Japanese footballer (born 1989)

Shoma Kamata 鎌田 翔雅

Personal information
- Full name: Shoma Kamata
- Date of birth: 15 June 1989 (age 37)
- Place of birth: Chigasaki, Kanagawa, Japan
- Height: 1.72 m (5 ft 8 in)
- Position: Defender

Youth career
- 1998–2007: Shonan Bellmare

Senior career*
Years	Team	Apps	(Gls)
2008–2014	Shonan Bellmare	90	(0)
2010	→ JEF United Chiba (loan)	15	(0)
2014	→ Fagiano Okayama (loan)	15	(0)
2015–2019	Shimizu S-Pulse	51	(2)
2020	Blaublitz Akita	23	(2)
2021	Fukushima United	25	(2)
2022	Kataller Toyama		

International career
- Japan U-23
Medal record
Representing Japan
Asian Games
Gold medal – first place	2010 Guangzhou	Team
- * Club domestic league appearances and goals as of 27 December 2021 (UTC)

Shoma Kamata (鎌田 翔雅, Kamata Shōma; born 15 June 1989 in Kanagawa) is a Japanese footballer who plays for Kataller Toyama.

== Career statistics ==
Updated to 27 December 2021.

Appearances and goals by club, season and competition
Club	Season	League			Emperor's Cup		J.League Cup		Total	
Club	Season	Division	Apps	Goals	Apps	Goals	Apps	Goals	Apps	Goals
Shonan Bellmare	2008	J2 League	2	0	0	0	-		2	0
Shonan Bellmare	2009	J2 League	7	0	1	0	-		8	0
JEF United Chiba	2010	J2 League	15	0	1	0	-		16	0
Shonan Bellmare	2011	J2 League	20	0	4	0	-		24	0
Shonan Bellmare	2012	J2 League	40	0	1	0	-		41	0
Shonan Bellmare	2013	J1 League	21	0	1	0	2	0	24	0
Fagiano Okayama	2014	J2 League	15	0	0	0	-		15	0
Shimizu S-Pulse	2015	J1 League	11	0	0	0	1	0	12	0
Shimizu S-Pulse	2016	J2 League	8	0	1	0	-		9	0
Shimizu S-Pulse	2017	J1 League	29	2	3	0	1	0	33	2
Shimizu S-Pulse	2018	J1 League	0	0	0	0	0	0	0	0
Shimizu S-Pulse	2019	J1 League	2	0	2	0	5	0	9	0
Blaublitz Akita	2020	J3 League	23	2	1	0	-		24	2
Fukushima United	2021	J3 League	25	2	-		-		25	2
Kataller Toyama	2022	J3 League	0	0	0	0	-		0	0
Career total			219	6	15	0	9	0	273	6

== Honours ==
Blaublitz Akita

- J3 League (1): 2020

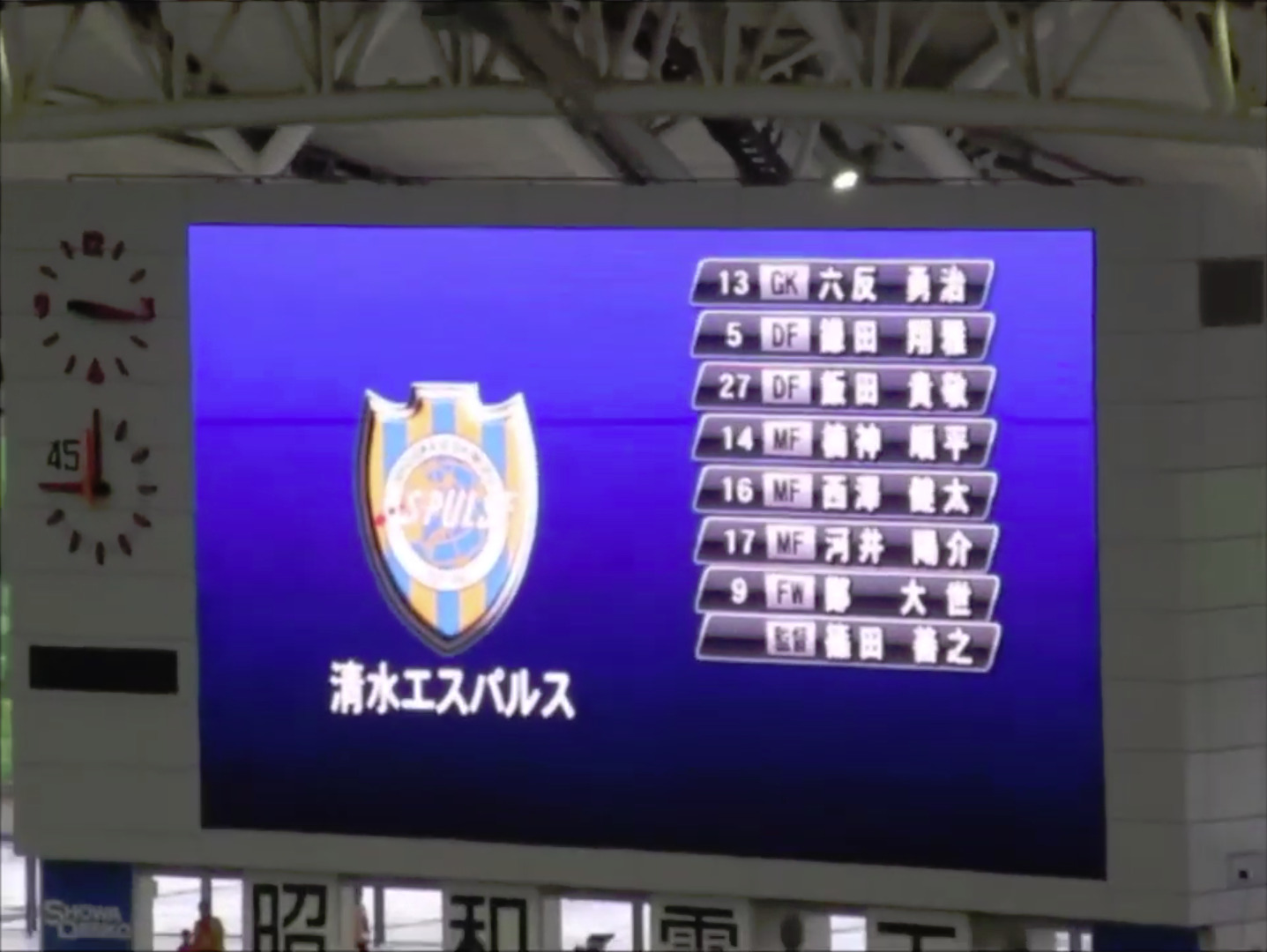
Showa Denko Dome Scoreboard

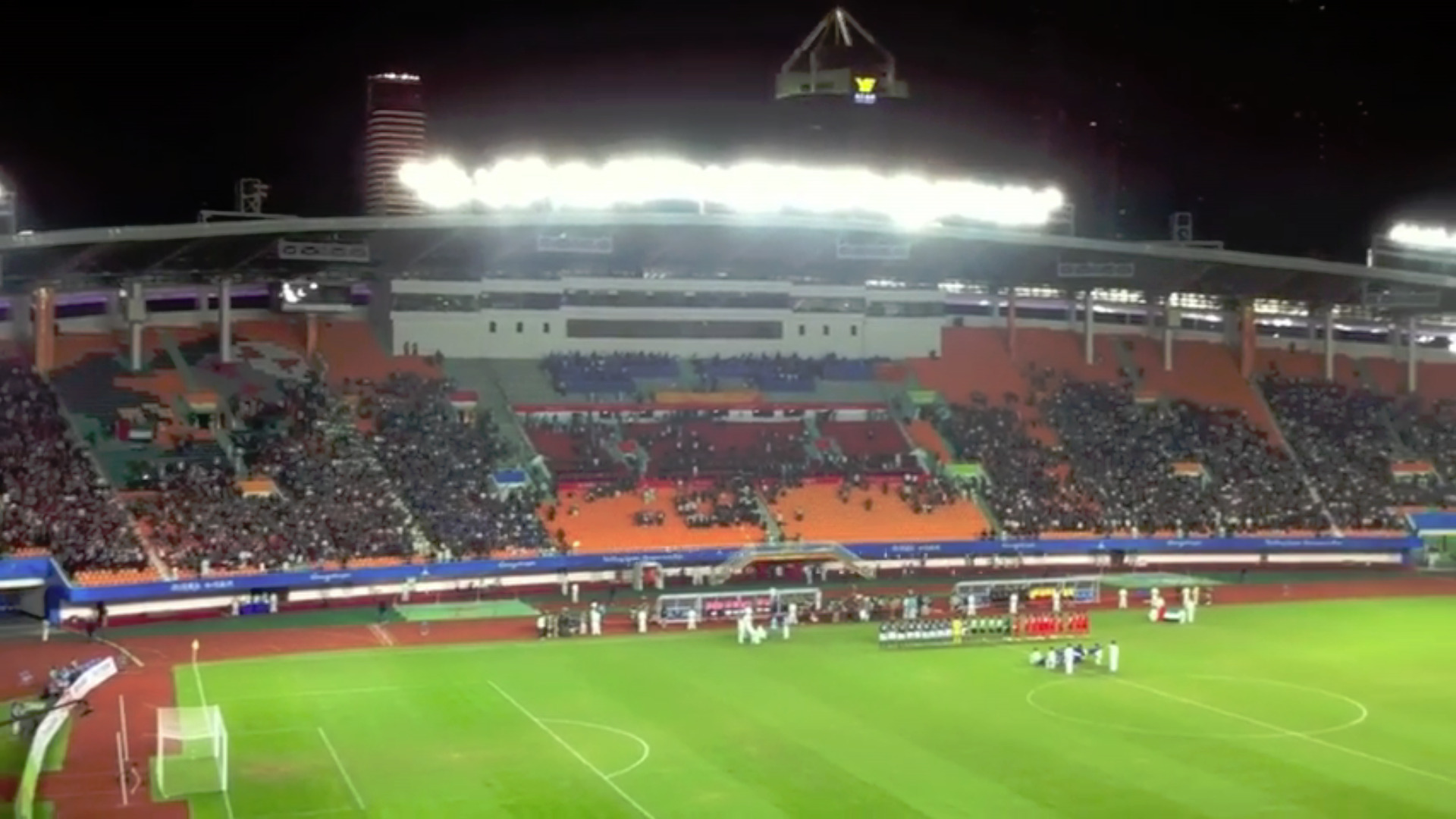
He won the Gold medal at 2010 Asian Games
