= Yasufumi Nishimura =

Japanese footballer (born 1999)

Yasufumi Nishimura 西村 恭史
Personal information
- Date of birth: 4 November 1999 (age 27)
- Place of birth: Osaka, Japan
- Height: 1.84 m (6 ft 0 in)
- Position: Defensive midfielder

Team information
- Current team: Oita Trinita
- Number: 7

Youth career
- 2015–2017: Kokoku High School

Senior career*
| Years | Team | Apps | (Gls) |
| 2018–2023 | Shimizu S-Pulse | 17 | (0) |
| 2019–2020 | → Fagiano Okayama (loan) | 1 | (0) |
| 2020–2022 | Giravanz Kitakyushu (Loan) | 59 | (3) |
| 2023 | AC Nagano Parceiro (loan) | 34 | (3) |
| 2024 | AC Nagano Parceiro | 35 | (1) |
| 2025–2026 | Thespa Gunma | 55 | (12) |
| 2026– | Oita Trinita | 2 | (0) |
- * Club domestic league appearances and goals as of 16 August 2026

Yasufumi Nishimura (西村 恭史, Nishimura Yasufumi; born 4 November 1999) is a Japanese football player who plays as a defensive midfielder for Oita Trinita.

== Career ==
Nishimura was born in Osaka Prefecture on 4 November 1999. After graduating from high school, he joined J1 League club Shimizu S-Pulse in 2018.

== Career statistics ==
As of 18 May 2019

Appearances and goals by club, season and competition
| Club | Season | League | | | Emperor's Cup | | League Cup | | Total | |
| Club | Season | Division | Apps | Goals | Apps | Goals | Apps | Goals | Apps | Goals |
|---|---|---|---|---|---|---|---|---|---|---|
| Shimizu S-Pulse | 2018 | J1 League | 0 | 0 | 0 | 0 | 2 | 0 | 2 | 0 |
| Career total | | | 0 | 0 | 0 | 0 | 2 | 0 | 2 | 0 |
