= Yuji Rokutan =

Japanese footballer

Yuji Rokutan 六反 勇治
Personal information
- Full name: Yuji Rokutan
- Date of birth: 10 April 1987 (age 39)
- Place of birth: Kagoshima, Japan
- Height: 1.86 m (6 ft 1 in)
- Position: Goalkeeper

Youth career
- 2003–2005: Kumamoto Kokufu High School

Senior career*
| Years | Team | Apps | (Gls) |
| 2006–2011 | Avispa Fukuoka | 40 | (0) |
| 2012–2014 | Yokohama F. Marinos | 2 | (0) |
| 2015–2016 | Vegalta Sendai | 45 | (0) |
| 2017–2020 | Shimizu S-Pulse | 78 | (1) |
| 2020 | → Yokohama FC (loan) | 23 | (0) |
| 2021–2025 | Yokohama FC | 15 | (0) |
| 2024 | → FC Ryukyu (loan) | 5 | (0) |
| 2025 | Fujieda MYFC | 0 | (0) |
Medal record
Yokohama F. Marinos
| Runner-up | J1 League | 2013 |
| Winner | Emperor's Cup | 2013 |
- * Club domestic league appearances and goals as of 14:11, 20 January 2025 (UTC)

Yuji Rokutan (六反 勇治, Rokutan Yūji; born April 10, 1987) is a Japanese professional footballer who plays as a goalkeeper for Fujieda MYFC.

== Club career statistics ==
Updated to 18 February 2019.

| Club performance | | | League | | Cup | | League Cup | | Total | |
| Season | Club | League | Apps | Goals | Apps | Goals | Apps | Goals | Apps | Goals |
| Japan | | | League | | Emperor's Cup | | League Cup | | Total | |
|---|---|---|---|---|---|---|---|---|---|---|
| 2006 | Avispa Fukuoka | J1 League | 0 | 0 | 0 | 0 | 0 | 0 | 0 | 0 |
| 2007 | Avispa Fukuoka | J2 League | 0 | 0 | 0 | 0 | - | | 0 | 0 |
| 2008 | Avispa Fukuoka | J2 League | 0 | 0 | 0 | 0 | - | | 0 | 0 |
| 2009 | Avispa Fukuoka | J2 League | 15 | 0 | 1 | 0 | - | | 16 | 0 |
| 2010 | Avispa Fukuoka | J2 League | 8 | 0 | 2 | 0 | - | | 10 | 0 |
| 2011 | Avispa Fukuoka | J1 League | 17 | 0 | 0 | 0 | 0 | 0 | 17 | 0 |
| 2012 | Yokohama F. Marinos | J1 League | 0 | 0 | 1 | 0 | 1 | 0 | 2 | 0 |
| 2013 | Yokohama F. Marinos | J1 League | 2 | 0 | 1 | 0 | 2 | 0 | 5 | 0 |
| 2014 | Yokohama F. Marinos | J1 League | 0 | 0 | 2 | 0 | 0 | 0 | 2 | 0 |
| 2015 | Vegalta Sendai | J1 League | 32 | 0 | 1 | 0 | 2 | 0 | 35 | 0 |
| 2016 | Vegalta Sendai | J1 League | 13 | 0 | 0 | 0 | 1 | 0 | 14 | 0 |
| 2017 | Shimizu S-Pulse | J1 League | 34 | 0 | 1 | 0 | 0 | 0 | 35 | 0 |
| 2018 | Shimizu S-Pulse | J1 League | 34 | 1 | 0 | 0 | 0 | 0 | 34 | 1 |
| Career total | | | 155 | 1 | 9 | 0 | 6 | 0 | 170 | 1 |

== International career ==
On 7 May 2015, Japan's coach Vahid Halilhodžić called him for a two-days training camp. Rokutan received his first call up to the senior Japan team in August 2015 for 2018 FIFA World Cup qualifiers against Cambodia and Afghanistan.

== Honours ==
Yokohama F. Marinos

- Emperor's Cup: 2013
