= 2022 Urawa Red Diamonds season =

Urawa Red Diamonds
2022 season
- Chairman: Keizo Fuchita
- Head coach: Ricardo Rodríguez
- Stadium: Saitama Stadium 2002
- J1 League: 9th
- Emperor's Cup: Third round
- J.League Cup: Semi-finals
- Japanese Super Cup: Winners
- AFC Champions League: Winners
- Top goalscorer: League: David Moberg Karlsson (8); All: David Moberg Karlsson (13)
Home colours	Away colours

The 2022 Urawa Red Diamonds season was the club's 72nd season in existence and the 22nd consecutive season in the top flight of Japanese football. In addition to the domestic league, Urawa Red Diamonds participated in this season's editions of the Emperor's Cup, the J.League Cup, the Japanese Super Cup and the AFC Champions League.

== Players ==
=== First-team squad ===
The team squad as of the end of the season. Note: Flags indicate national team as defined under FIFA eligibility rules; some limited exceptions apply. Players may hold more than one non-FIFA nationality.

No.	Pos.	Nation	Player
1	GK	JPN	Shusaku Nishikawa (captain)
2	DF	JPN	Hiroki Sakai
3	MF	JPN	Atsuki Ito
4	DF	JPN	Takuya Iwanami
6	DF	JPN	Kazuaki Mawatari
7	FW	DEN	Kasper Junker
8	MF	JPN	Yoshio Koizumi
9	FW	NED	Bryan Linssen
10	FW	SWE	David Moberg Karlsson
11	MF	JPN	Yusuke Matsuo
12	GK	JPN	Zion Suzuki
13	DF	JPN	Tomoya Inukai
14	MF	JPN	Takahiro Sekine
15	MF	JPN	Takahiro Akimoto
16	GK	JPN	Ayumi Niekawa
17	FW	NED	Alex Schalk
19	MF	JPN	Ken Iwao (on loan from Tokushima Vortis)

No.	Pos.	Nation	Player
20	DF	JPN	Tetsuya Chinen
21	MF	JPN	Tomoaki Okubo
22	MF	JPN	Kai Shibato
24	DF	JPN	Yuta Miyamoto
25	MF	JPN	Kaito Yasui
26	FW	JPN	Rei Kihara
27	MF	JPN	Kai Matsuzaki
28	DF	DEN	Alexander Scholz
33	MF	JPN	Ataru Esaka
40	MF	JPN	Yuichi Hirano
42	DF	JPN	Kota Kudo
44	DF	JPN	Ayumu Ohata
45	DF	JPN	Atsushi Inagaki ^{Type 2}
46	FW	JPN	Jumpei Hayakawa ^{Type 2}
47	GK	JPN	Shogo Neyama ^{Type 2}
48	GK	JPN	Yuto Ebashi ^{Type 2}

=== Out on loan ===
Note: Flags indicate national team as defined under FIFA eligibility rules; some limited exceptions apply. Players may hold more than one non-FIFA nationality.

No.	Pos.	Nation	Player
—	GK	JPN	Ryo Ishii (On loan at YSCC Yokohama)
—	DF	JPN	Yudai Fujiwara (On loan at SC Sagamihara)
—	DF	JPN	Takuya Ogiwara (On loan at Kyoto Sanga)
—	DF	JPN	Ryuya Fukushima (On loan at SC Sagamihara)

No.	Pos.	Nation	Player
—	MF	JPN	Daiki Kaneko (On loan at Kyoto Sanga)
—	MF	JPN	Hidetoshi Takeda (On loan at Omiya Ardija)
—	FW	JPN	Shinzo Koroki (On loan at Hokkaido Consadole Sapporo)
—	FW	JPN	Kenyu Sugimoto (On loan at Júbilo Iwata)

== Pre-season and friendlies ==
Win Draw Loss Fixtures

30 January 2022 Training match	Urawa Red Diamonds (Japan)	6–5	(Japan) Sagan Tosu	Kin, Japan
12:00 JST (UTC+9)	Matsuo; Okubo; Esaka; Hirano; (o.g.)	Urawa report Sagan report	Kakita; Ishii; Araki; Kajiya	Stadium: Kin Town Football Center

23 July 2022 Friendly	Paris Saint-Germain (France)	3–0	(Japan) Urawa Red Diamonds	Saitama, Japan
19:00 JST (UTC+9)	Sarabia 16'; Mbappé 35'; Kalimuendo 76'		Shibato (yellow card) 80'	Stadium: Saitama Stadium 2002; Attendance: 65,000; Referee: Ryuji Sato (Japan)

16 November 2022 Friendly	Urawa Red Diamonds (Japan)	4–2	(Germany) Eintracht Frankfurt	Saitama, Japan
19:30 JST (UTC+9)	Junker 19', 27'; Scholz 50'; Matsuo 78'		Alaoui 47'; Ferri 82'	Stadium: Saitama Stadium 2002

== Competitions ==
=== Overall record ===
Competition	First match	Last match	Starting round	Final position	Record							
Competition	First match	Last match	Starting round	Final position	Pld	W	D	L	GF	GA	GD	Win %
J1 League	19 February 2022	5 November 2022	Matchday 1	9th	34	10	15	9	48	39	+9	29.41
Emperor's Cup	1 June 2022	22 June 2022	Second round	Third round	2	1	0	1	1	1	+0	50.00
J.League Cup	3 August 2022	24 September 2022	Quarter-finals	Semi-finals	4	1	2	1	5	6	−1	25.00
Japanese Super Cup	12 February 2022		Final	Winners	1	1	0	0	2	0	+2	100.00
AFC Champions League	15 April 2022	6 May 2023	Group stage	Winners	11	7	3	1	33	5	+28	63.64
Total					52	20	20	12	89	51	+38	38.46

Source: Soccerway

=== J1 League ===
==== League table ====
Pos	Team	Pld	W	D	L	GF	GA	GD	Pts	Qualification or relegation
7	Kashiwa Reysol	34	13	8	13	43	44	−1	47	
8	Nagoya Grampus	34	11	13	10	30	35	−5	46	
9	Urawa Red Diamonds	34	10	15	9	48	39	+9	45	Qualification for the AFC Champions League play-off round (Note: Urawa Red Diamonds won the Champions League but did not qualify for the Champions League via league position. As a result, the last spot distributed to the third-placed team was transferred to Urawa Red Diamonds pursuant to the rules that Champions League winners would guaranteed a Champions League spot.)
10	Hokkaido Consadole Sapporo	34	11	12	11	45	55	−10	45	
11	Sagan Tosu	34	9	15	10	45	44	+1	42	

Source: J.League Data Site
Rules for classification: 1) Points; 2) Goal difference; 3) Goals scored; 4) Head-to-head points; 5) Head-to-head goal difference; 6) Head-to-head goals scored; 7) Fewer disciplinary points.

==== Results summary ====
Overall								Home						Away					
Pld	W	D	L	GF	GA	GD	Pts	W	D	L	GF	GA	GD	W	D	L	GF	GA	GD
34	10	15	9	48	39	+9	45	7	8	2	32	17	+15	3	7	7	16	22	−6

Source: Soccerway

==== Results by round ====
Round	1	2	3	4	5	6	7	8	9	10	11	12	13	14	15	16	17	18	19	20	21	22	23	24	25	26	27	28	29	30	31	32	33	34
Ground	A	H	H	A	H	A	H	A	H	A	H	A	H	H	A	A	H	A	A	H	H	A	H	A	A	H	H	A	H	A	A	H	A	H
Result	L	L	W	L	W	D	D	D	D	L	D	D	D	D	L	D	W	W	D	D	W	W	W	L	W	L	D	D	W	D	L	W	L	D

Source: Soccerway
A = Away; H = Home; W = Win; D = Draw; L = Loss

==== Matches ====
The league fixtures were announced on 21 January 2022.

19 February 2022 1	Kyoto Sanga	1–0	Urawa Red Diamonds	Kameoka
14:03 JST (UTC+9)	Utaka 49'	Report		Stadium: Sanga Stadium by Kyocera; Attendance: 11,701; Referee: Koichiro Fukushima

23 February 2022 9	Urawa Red Diamonds	2–2	Vissel Kobe	Saitama
16:04 JST (UTC+9)	Matsuzaki 12'; Shibato 19'	Report	Muto 10'; Makino 87'	Stadium: Saitama Stadium 2002; Attendance: 19,446; Referee: Hiroyuki Kimura

26 February 2022 2	Urawa Red Diamonds	0–1	Gamba Osaka	Saitama
15:01 JST (UTC+9)		Report	Fukuda 83'	Stadium: Saitama Stadium 2002; Attendance: 16,121; Referee: Jumpei Iida

2 March 2022 10	Kawasaki Frontale	2–1	Urawa Red Diamonds	Kawasaki
19:03 JST (UTC+9)	Ienaga 62'; Yamane 64'	Report	Iwanami 33'	Stadium: Kawasaki Todoroki Stadium; Attendance: 14,696; Referee: Ryuji Sato

6 March 2022 3	Urawa Red Diamonds	2–0	Shonan Bellmare	Saitama
15:04 JST (UTC+9)	Esaka 16'; Mawatari 87'	Report		Stadium: Saitama Stadium 2002; Attendance: 19,144; Referee: Hajime Matsuo

13 March 2022 4	Sagan Tosu	1–0	Urawa Red Diamonds	Tosu
15:03 JST (UTC+9)	Kakita 71'	Report		Stadium: Ekimae Real Estate Stadium; Attendance: 9,627; Referee: Hayato Shimizu

19 March 2022 5	Urawa Red Diamonds	4–1	Júbilo Iwata	Saitama
15:04 JST (UTC+9)	Inukai 8'; Junker 11'; Scholz 37' (pen.); Moberg 48'	Report	Suzuki 14'	Stadium: Saitama Stadium 2002; Attendance: 24,207; Referee: Futoshi Nakamura

2 April 2022 6	Consadole Sapporo	1–1	Urawa Red Diamonds	Sapporo
19:03 JST (UTC+9)	Kaneko 72'	Report	Moberg 30' (pen.)	Stadium: Sapporo Dome; Attendance: 11,345; Referee: Tomohiro Inoue

6 April 2022 7	Urawa Red Diamonds	1–1	Shimizu S-Pulse	Saitama
19:33 JST (UTC+9)	Esaka 33' (pen.)	Report	Valdo 69'	Stadium: Saitama Stadium 2002; Attendance: 18,757; Referee: Akihiko Ikeuchi

10 April 2022 8	FC Tokyo	0–0	Urawa Red Diamonds	Chofu
14:02 JST (UTC+9)		Report		Stadium: Ajinomoto Stadium; Attendance: 22,429; Referee: Takafumi Mikuriya

8 May 2022 12	Kashiwa Reysol	0–0	Urawa Red Diamonds	Kashiwa
16:03 JST (UTC+9)		Report		Stadium: Sankyo Frontier Kashiwa Stadium; Attendance: 13,418; Referee: Hajime Matsuo

13 May 2022 13	Urawa Red Diamonds	0–0	Sanfrecce Hiroshima	Saitama
19:33 JST (UTC+9)		Report		Stadium: Saitama Stadium 2002; Attendance: 16,030; Referee: Jumpei Iida

18 May 2022 11	Urawa Red Diamonds	3–3	Yokohama F. Marinos	Saitama
19:34 JST (UTC+9)	Junker 47', 81', 89'	Report	Mizunuma 12'; Anderson Lopes 19'; Miyaichi 30'	Stadium: Saitama Stadium 2002; Attendance: 19,425; Referee: Yusuke Araki

21 May 2022 14	Urawa Red Diamonds	1–1	Kashima Antlers	Saitama
17:04 JST (UTC+9)	Scholz 44' (pen.)	Report	Arthur Caíke 6'	Stadium: Saitama Stadium 2002; Attendance: 37,144; Referee: Yuichi Nishimura

25 May 2022 15	Cerezo Osaka	2–0	Urawa Red Diamonds	Osaka
19:03 JST (UTC+9)	Kiyotake 67' (pen.); Maikuma 89'	Report		Stadium: Yodoko Sakura Stadium; Attendance: 7,346; Referee: Ryuji Sato

28 May 2022 16	Avispa Fukuoka	0–0	Urawa Red Diamonds	Fukuoka
17:03 JST (UTC+9)		Report		Stadium: Best Denki Stadium; Attendance: 9,136; Referee: Yoshiro Imamura

18 June 2022 17	Urawa Red Diamonds	3–0	Nagoya Grampus	Saitama
19:04 JST (UTC+9)	Scholz 21'; Ito 23'; Sekine 36'	Report		Stadium: Saitama Stadium 2002; Attendance: 28,699; Referee: Koichiro Fukushima

26 June 2022 18	Vissel Kobe	0–1	Urawa Red Diamonds	Kobe
18:03 JST (UTC+9)		Report	Moberg 90'	Stadium: Noevir Stadium Kobe; Attendance: 21,456; Referee: Tomohiro Inoue

2 July 2022 19	Gamba Osaka	1–1	Urawa Red Diamonds	Suita
19:03 JST (UTC+9)	Saito 33'	Report	Scholz 90+2' (pen.)	Stadium: Panasonic Stadium Suita; Attendance: 18,741; Referee: Yuichi Nishimura

6 July 2022 20	Urawa Red Diamonds	2–2	Kyoto Sanga	Saitama
19:33 JST (UTC+9)	Moberg 10' (pen.), 59'	Report	Taketomi 54'; Yamada 56'	Stadium: Saitama Stadium 2002; Attendance: 15,921; Referee: Futoshi Nakamura

10 July 2022 21	Urawa Red Diamonds	3–0	FC Tokyo	Saitama
19:03 JST (UTC+9)	Moberg 31'; Ito 50'; Okubo 70'	Report		Stadium: Saitama Stadium 2002; Attendance: 26,293; Referee: Hayato Shimizu

16 July 2022 22	Shimizu S-Pulse	1–2	Urawa Red Diamonds	Shizuoka
18:03 JST (UTC+9)	Yamahara 79'	Report	Matsuo 42'; Yamahara 73' (pen.)	Stadium: IAI Stadium Nihondaira; Attendance: 11,776; Referee: Koichiro Fukushima

30 July 2022 23	Urawa Red Diamonds	3–1	Kawasaki Frontale	Saitama
19:04 JST (UTC+9)	Ito 4'; Matsuo 17'; Iwao 85'	Report	Ienaga 82'	Stadium: Saitama Stadium 2002; Attendance: 35,451; Referee: Hajime Matsuo

6 August 2022 24	Nagoya Grampus	3–0	Urawa Red Diamonds	Toyota
19:03 JST (UTC+9)	Shigehiro 27'; Mateus 45+5'; Nagai 64'	Report		Stadium: Toyota Stadium; Attendance: 33,005; Referee: Jumpei Iida

13 August 2022 25	Júbilo Iwata	0–6	Urawa Red Diamonds	Fukuroi
18:33 JST (UTC+9)		Report	Moberg 5', 40'; Koizumi 13', 66'; Ito 63'; Junker 79'	Stadium: Ecopa Stadium; Attendance: 12,462; Referee: Yudai Yamamoto

3 September 2022 28	Kashima Antlers	2–2	Urawa Red Diamonds	Kashima
18:04 JST (UTC+9)	Arthur Caíke 16', 27'	Report	Matsuo 30'; Iwanami 69'	Stadium: Kashima Soccer Stadium; Attendance: 20,664; Referee: Hiroki Kasahara

10 September 2022 29	Urawa Red Diamonds	4–1	Kashiwa Reysol	Saitama
19:04 JST (UTC+9)	Matsuo 7'; Schalk 24'; Chinen 57'; Scholz 85'	Report	Hosoya 89'	Stadium: Saitama Stadium 2002; Attendance: 28,632; Referee: Ryuji Sato

14 September 2022 26	Urawa Red Diamonds	0–1	Cerezo Osaka	Saitama
19:34 JST (UTC+9)		Report	Kato 24'	Stadium: Saitama Stadium 2002; Attendance: 17,390; Referee: Yuichi Nishimura

17 September 2022 30	Shonan Bellmare	0–0	Urawa Red Diamonds	Hiratsuka
19:03 JST (UTC+9)		Report		Stadium: Lemon Gas Stadium Hiratsuka; Attendance: 11,594; Referee: Takuto Okabe

1 October 2022 31	Sanfrecce Hiroshima	4–1	Urawa Red Diamonds	Hiroshima
15:03 JST (UTC+9)	Morishima 22'; Araki 62'; Mitsuta 71', 83'	Report	Shibato 76'	Stadium: Edion Stadium Hiroshima; Attendance: 17,421; Referee: Takafumi Mikuriya

8 October 2022 32	Urawa Red Diamonds	2–1	Sagan Tosu	Saitama
15:03 JST (UTC+9)	Junker 40'; Koizumi 50'	Report	Miyashiro 62'	Stadium: Saitama Stadium 2002; Attendance: 26,503; Referee: Yoshimi Yamashita

12 October 2022 27	Urawa Red Diamonds	1–1	Consadole Sapporo	Saitama
19:34 JST (UTC+9)	Scholz 89' (pen.)	Report	Fernandes 71'	Stadium: Saitama Stadium 2002; Attendance: 18,510; Referee: Ryo Tanimoto

29 October 2022 33	Yokohama F. Marinos	4–1	Urawa Red Diamonds	Yokohama
15:03 JST (UTC+9)	Élber 17', 57'; Anderson Lopes 37', 65'	Report	Junker 67'	Stadium: Nissan Stadium; Attendance: 46,387; Referee: Ryuji Sato

5 November 2022 34	Urawa Red Diamonds	1–1	Avispa Fukuoka	Saitama
14:03 JST (UTC+9)	Iwanami 56'	Report	Juanma 60'	Stadium: Saitama Stadium 2002; Attendance: 33,816; Referee: Hajime Matsuo

Source: J.League

=== Emperor's Cup ===
1 June 2022 Second round	Urawa Red Diamonds	1–0	Fukushima United	Saitama, Saitama
19:00 JST	Akimoto 47'	Report		Stadium: Urawa Komaba Stadium; Attendance: 6,812; Referee: Takuto Okabe

22 June 2022 Third round	Urawa Red Diamonds	0–1	Thespakusatsu Gunma	Maebashi, Gunma
19:00 JST		Report	Takagi 35'	Stadium: Shoda Shoyu Stadium Gunma; Attendance: 1,151; Referee: Hiroyoshi Takayama

=== J.League Cup ===
==== Quarter-finals ====
3 August 2022 First leg	Nagoya Grampus	1–1	Urawa Red Diamonds	Aichi
19:33	Morishita 59'	JLeague.co (EN); JLeague.jp (JA)	Matsuo 36'	Stadium: Toyota Stadium; Attendance: 6,179; Referee: Ryo Tanimoto

10 August 2022 Second leg	Urawa Red Diamonds	3–0 (4–1 agg.)	Nagoya Grampus	Saitama
19:33	Ito 31', 41'; Esaka 86'	JLeague.co (EN); JLeague.jp (JA)		Stadium: Saitama Stadium 2002; Attendance: 23,435; Referee: Yuichi Nishimura

==== Semi-finals ====
21 September 2022 First leg	Cerezo Osaka	1–1	Urawa Red Diamonds	Osaka
19:03	Uejo 2'	JLeague.co (EN); JLeague.jp (JA)	Koizumi 53'	Stadium: Yodoko Sakura Stadium; Attendance: 10,399; Referee: Hajime Matsuo

25 September 2022 Second leg	Urawa Red Diamonds	0–4 (1–5 agg.)	Cerezo Osaka	Saitama
17:03		JLeague.co (EN); JLeague.jp (JA)	Akimoto 23' (o.g.); Okuno 30'; Kato 51'; Patric 81'	Stadium: Saitama Stadium 2002; Attendance: 26,899; Referee: Koichiro Fukushima

=== Japanese Super Cup ===
12 February 2022 Final	Kawasaki Frontale	0–2	Urawa Red Diamonds	Yokohama
13:35 JST		JLeague.co (EN); JLeague.jp (JA)	Esaka 7', 81'	Stadium: Nissan Stadium; Attendance: 18,558; Referee: Hiroki Kasahara

=== AFC Champions League ===
==== Group stage ====
Pos	Team	Pld	W	D	L	GF	GA	GD	Pts	Qualification	DAE	URA	LCS	SDT
1	(South Korea) Daegu FC	6	4	1	1	14	4	+10	13 (Note: Head-to-head points: Daegu FC 4, Urawa Red Diamonds 1.)	Advance to Round of 16	—	1–0	0–3	4–0
2	(Japan) Urawa Red Diamonds	6	4	1	1	20	2	+18	13	Advance to Round of 16	0–0	—	6–0	5–0
3	(Singapore) Lion City Sailors	6	2	1	3	8	14	−6	7		1–2	1–4	—	3–2
4	(China) Shandong Taishan	6	0	1	5	2	24	−22	1		0–7	0–5	0–0	—

Source: AFC
Rules for classification: Tiebreakers
Notes:

15 April 2022 1	Lion City Sailors (Singapore)	1–4	(Japan) Urawa Red Diamonds	Buriram, Thailand
21:00 UTC+7	Karlsson 43' (o.g.)	Report	Junker 8'; Esaka 15'; Karlsson 42'; Matsuo 47'	Stadium: Buriram Stadium; Attendance: 394; Referee: Salman Ahmad Falahi (Qatar)

18 April 2022 2	Urawa Red Diamonds (Japan)	5–0	(China) Shandong Taishan	Buriram, Thailand
21:00 UTC+7	Akimoto 26'; Scholz 31' (pen.); Schalk 53', 76'; Yasui 90+2'	Report		Stadium: Buriram Stadium; Attendance: 321; Referee: Nivon Robesh Gamini (Sri Lanka)

21 April 2022 3	Daegu FC (South Korea)	1–0	(Japan) Urawa Red Diamonds	Buriram, Thailand
21:00 UTC+7	Zeca 53'	Report		Stadium: Buriram Stadium; Attendance: 375; Referee: Ahmed Al-Ali (Jordan)

24 April 2022 4	Urawa Red Diamonds (Japan)	0–0	(South Korea) Daegu FC	Buriram, Thailand
18:00 UTC+7		Report		Stadium: Buriram City Stadium; Attendance: 436; Referee: Alireza Faghani (Iran)

27 April 2022 5	Urawa Red Diamonds (Japan)	6–0	(Singapore) Lion City Sailors	Buriram, Thailand
18:00 UTC+7	Mawatari 14'; Schalk 39'; Karlsson 48'; Koizumi 52'; Matsuo 62', 90'	Report		Stadium: Buriram City Stadium; Attendance: 313; Referee: Omar Mohamed Al-Ali (United Arab Emirates)

30 April 2022 6	Shandong Taishan (China)	0–5	(Japan) Urawa Red Diamonds	Buriram, Thailand
18:00 UTC+7		Report	Yasui 13'; Chinen 34', 85'; Matsuo 45+1', 69'	Stadium: Buriram City Stadium; Attendance: 393; Referee: Abdulla Al-Marri (Qatar)

==== Knockout stage ====
19 August 2022 Round of 16	Johor Darul Ta'zim (Malaysia)	0–5	(Japan) Urawa Red Diamonds	Saitama
20:00 UTC+9		Report	Scholz 8' (pen.); Karlsson 19', 39'; Junker 84', 90+1'	Stadium: Saitama Stadium 2002; Attendance: 20,691; Referee: Chris Beath (Australia)

22 August 2022 Quarter-finals	Urawa Red Diamonds (Japan)	4–0	(Thailand) BG Pathum United	Saitama
20:00 UTC+9	Karlsson 32'; Iwanami 42'; Koizumi 65'; Akimoto 72'	Report		Stadium: Saitama Stadium 2002; Attendance: 16,210; Referee: Mohammed Al-Hoish (Saudi Arabia)

25 August 2022 Semi-finals	Jeonbuk Hyundai Motors (South Korea)	2–2 (a.e.t.) (1–3 p)	(Japan) Urawa Red Diamonds	Saitama
19:30 UTC+9	Paik Seung-ho 55' (pen.); Han Kyo-won 116'	Report	Matsuo 11'; Junker 120'	Stadium: Saitama Stadium 2002; Attendance: 23,277; Referee: Alireza Faghani (Iran)
	Penalties
	Kim Bo-kyung (penalty missed); Lee Seung-gi (penalty missed); Park Jin-seop (penalty scored); Kim Jin-su (penalty missed)		(penalty scored) Scholz; (penalty scored) Junker; (penalty missed) Karlsson; (penalty scored) Esaka

=== Final ===
29 April 2023 Final (1st Leg)	Al-Hilal (Saudi Arabia)	1–1	(Japan) Urawa Red Diamonds	Riyadh
20:30 UTC+3	Al-Dawsari 13' (red card) 86'	Report	Koroki 53'; Ito (yellow card) 85'; Iwao (yellow card) 86'	Stadium: King Fahd International Stadium; Attendance: 50,881; Referee: Ahmed Al-Kaf (Oman)
Note: The two-legged final was originally scheduled to be played on 19 and 26 February. However, Urawa's main stadium, the Saitama Stadium 2002 was not available due to pitch maintenance around this date, and then, would see Urawa having to host the second leg at the Urawa Komaba Stadium. As a result of this conflict, the AFC decided to rearrange the dates even further on the calendar, rescheduling the matches to late April and early May.

6 May 2023 Final (2nd Leg)	Urawa Red Diamonds (Japan)	1–0 (2–1 agg.)	(Saudi Arabia) Al-Hilal	Saitama
18:00 UTC+9	Okubo (yellow card) 36'; Carrillo 48' (o.g.)	Report	Al-Bulaihi (yellow card) 88'	Stadium: Saitama Stadium 2002; Attendance: 53,374; Referee: Ma Ning (China)
Note: Open the 1st leg final box above to see the note

== Goalscorers ==
Rank	Pos.	No.	Player	J1 League	Emperor's Cup	J.League Cup	AFC CL	Super Cup	Total
1	FW	10	(Sweden) David Moberg Karlsson	8	0	0	5	0	13
2	FW	7	(Denmark) Kasper Junker	7	0	0	4	0	11
2	FW	11	(Japan) Yusuke Matsuo	4	0	1	6	0	11
4	DF	28	(Denmark) Alexander Scholz	6	0	0	2	0	8
5	MF	3	(Japan) Atsuki Ito	4	0	2	0	0	6
5	MF	4	(Japan) Takuya Iwanami	3	0	0	1	0	4
5	MF	8	(Japan) Yoshio Koizumi	3	0	1	2	0	6
5	MF	33	(Japan) Ataru Esaka	2	0	1	1	2	6
8	FW	17	(Netherlands) Alex Schalk	1	0	0	3	0	4
10	DF	20	(Japan) Tetsuya Chinen	1	0	0	2	0	3
10	MF	15	(Japan) Takahiro Akimoto	0	1	0	2	0	3
12	MF	22	(Japan) Kai Shibato	2	0	0	0	0	2
12	DF	6	(Japan) Kazuaki Mawatari	1	0	0	1	0	2
12	MF	25	(Japan) Kaito Yasui	0	0	0	2	0	2
15	MF	19	(Japan) Ken Iwao	1	0	0	0	0	1
15	MF	21	(Japan) Tomoaki Okubo	1	0	0	0	0	1
15	MF	27	(Japan) Kai Matsuzaki	1	0	0	0	0	1
15	DF	39	(Japan) Tomoya Inukai	1	0	0	0	0	1
15	MF	41	(Japan) Takahiro Sekine	1	0	0	0	0	1
