= 2022 AFC Champions League knockout stage =

Asian Football Champions knockout round

The 2022 AFC Champions League knockout stage was played from 18 August 2022 to 6 May 2023. A total of 16 teams competed in the knockout stage to decide the champions of the 2022 AFC Champions League.

== Qualified teams ==
The group winners and three best runners-up in the group stage from each region advanced to the round of 16, with both West Region (Groups A–E) and East Region (Groups F–J) having eight qualified teams.

Region	Group	Winners	Runners-up (best three from each region)
West Region	A	(Saudi Arabian Football Federation) Al-Hilal	(Qatar Football Association) Al-Rayyan
West Region	B	(Saudi Arabian Football Federation) Al Shabab	—
West Region	C	(Football Federation Islamic Republic of Iran) Foolad	(United Arab Emirates Football Association) Shabab Al-Ahli
West Region	D	(Qatar Football Association) Al-Duhail	—
West Region	E	(Saudi Arabian Football Federation) Al-Faisaly	(Uzbekistan Football Association) Nasaf Qarshi
East Region	F	(Korea Football Association) Daegu FC	(Japan Football Association) Urawa Red Diamonds
East Region	G	(Football Association of Thailand) BG Pathum United	—
East Region	H	(Japan Football Association) Yokohama F. Marinos	(Korea Football Association) Jeonbuk Hyundai Motors
East Region	I	(Football Association of Malaysia) Johor Darul Ta'zim	—
East Region	J	(Japan Football Association) Vissel Kobe	(Football Association of Hong Kong, China) Kitchee

== Format ==
In the knockout stage, the 16 teams played a single-elimination tournament, with the teams split into the two regions until the final. All ties were played as a single-leg match (Regulations Article 9.1), except for the final, which was played over two legs. Extra time and penalty shoot-out were used to decide the winners if necessary (Regulations Article 9.3 and 10.1).

== Schedule ==
The schedule of each round was as follows.

Round	West Region	East Region
Round of 16	19–20 February 2023	18–19 August 2022
Quarter-finals	23 February 2023	22 August 2022
Semi-finals	26 February 2023	25 August 2022
Round	First leg	Second leg
Final	29 April 2023	6 May 2023

== Bracket ==
Round of 16
19 February 2023 – Doha
(Qatar Football Association) Al-Duhail (p)	1 (7)
(Qatar Football Association) Al-Rayyan	1 (6)
19 February 2023 – Al Wakrah
(Saudi Arabian Football Federation) Al-Shabab	2
(Uzbekistan Football Association) Nasaf Qarshi	0
20 February 2023 – Doha
(Saudi Arabian Football Federation) Al-Faisaly	0
(Football Federation Islamic Republic of Iran) Foolad	1
20 February 2023 – Al Wakrah
(Saudi Arabian Football Federation) Al-Hilal	3
(United Arab Emirates Football Association) Shabab Al-Ahli	1
18 August 2022 – Saitama (2002)
(Japan Football Association) Vissel Kobe	3
(Japan Football Association) Yokohama F. Marinos	2
18 August 2022 – Saitama (Urawa)
(Korea Football Association) Daegu FC	1
(Korea Football Association) Jeonbuk Hyundai Motors (a.e.t.)	2
19 August 2022 – Saitama (2002)
(Football Association of Malaysia) Johor Darul Ta'zim	0
(Japan Football Association) Urawa Red Diamonds	5
19 August 2022 – Saitama (Urawa)
(Football Association of Thailand) BG Pathum United	4
(Football Association of Hong Kong, China) Kitchee SC	0

Quarter-finals
23 February 2023 – Doha
(Qatar Football Association) Al-Duhail	2
(Saudi Arabian Football Federation) Al-Shabab	1
West Region
23 February 2023 – Al Wakrah
(Football Federation Islamic Republic of Iran) Foolad	0
(Saudi Arabian Football Federation) Al-Hilal	1
22 August 2022 – Saitama (2002)
(Japan Football Association) Vissel Kobe	1
(Korea Football Association) Jeonbuk Hyundai Motors (a.e.t.)	3
East Region
22 August 2022 – Saitama (2002)
(Japan Football Association) Urawa Red Diamonds	4
(Football Association of Thailand) BG Pathum United	0

Semi-finals
26 February 2023 – Doha
(Qatar Football Association) Al-Duhail	0
(Saudi Arabian Football Federation) Al-Hilal	7
25 August 2022 – Saitama (2002)
(Korea Football Association) Jeonbuk Hyundai Motors	2 (1)
(Japan Football Association) Urawa Red Diamonds (p)	2 (3)

Final
(Saudi Arabian Football Federation) Al-Hilal	1	0	1
(Japan Football Association) Urawa Red Diamonds	1	1	2

== Round of 16 ==
=== Combination tables ===
West Region

Combination according to the three qualified teams

Qualified	1A vs	1B vs	1C vs	1D vs	1E vs
2A/2B/2C	1B*	1A	2A	2B	2C
2A/2B/2D	1D	2D	2A	1A*	2B
2A/2B/2E	1E	2E	2A	2B	1A*
2A/2C/2D	1C*	2D	1A	2A	2C
2A/2C/2E	2C	2E	1E*	2A	1C
2A/2D/2E	2D	2E	2A	1E*	1D
2B/2C/2D	2D	1C*	1B	2B	2C
2B/2C/2E	2C	1E	2E	2B	1B*
2B/2D/2E	2D	1D*	2E	1B	2B
2C/2D/2E	2D	2E	1D*	1C	2C

East Region

Combination according to the three qualified teams

Qualified	1F vs	1G vs	1H vs	1I vs	1J vs
2F/2G/2H	1G*	1F	2F	2G	2H
2F/2G/2I	1I	2I	2F	1F*	2G
2F/2G/2J	1J	2J	2F	2G	1F*
2F/2H/2I	1H*	2I	1F	2F	2H
2F/2H/2J	2H	2J	1J*	2F	1H
2F/2I/2J	2I	2J	2F	1J*	1I
2G/2H/2I	2I	1H*	1G	2G	2H
2G/2H/2J	2H	1J	2J	2G	1G*
2G/2I/2J	2I	1I*	2J	1G	2G
2H/2I/2J	2I	2J	1I*	1H	2H

=== Summary ===
The round of 16 was played over one leg, with the matchups determined by the combination tables based on which group runners-up qualified.

West Region
Team 1	Score	Team 2
Al-Hilal (Saudi Arabia)	3–1	(United Arab Emirates) Shabab Al-Ahli
Al-Shabab (Saudi Arabia)	2–0	(Uzbekistan) Nasaf Qarshi
Al-Duhail (Qatar)	1–1 (a.e.t.) (7–6 p)	(Qatar) Al-Rayyan
Al-Faisaly (Saudi Arabia)	0–1	(Iran) Foolad

East Region
Team 1	Score	Team 2
Daegu FC (South Korea)	1–2 (a.e.t.)	(South Korea) Jeonbuk Hyundai Motors
BG Pathum United (Thailand)	4–0	(Hong Kong) Kitchee
Johor Darul Ta'zim (Malaysia)	0–5	(Japan) Urawa Red Diamonds
Vissel Kobe (Japan)	3–2	(Japan) Yokohama F. Marinos

=== West Region ===
20 February 2023
21:00 UTC+3

Al-Hilal (Saudi Arabian Football Federation)	3–1	(United Arab Emirates Football Association) Shabab Al-Ahli
Ighalo 17'; Jang Hyun-soo 73'; Vietto 79'	Report	Kharbin 86'

Al Janoub Stadium, Al Wakrah
Attendance: 7,825
Referee: Fu Ming (China)

19 February 2023
21:00 UTC+3

Al-Shabab (Saudi Arabian Football Federation)	2–0	(Uzbekistan Football Association) Nasaf Qarshi
Al-Qahtani 12'; Banega 54'	Report

Al Janoub Stadium, Al Wakrah
Attendance: 700
Referee: Adham Makhadmeh (Jordan)

19 February 2023
18:00 UTC+3

Al-Duhail (Qatar Football Association)	1–1 (a.e.t.)	(Qatar Football Association) Al-Rayyan
Muntari 107'	Report	N'Zonzi 120+3'
Penalties
Edmilson Jr. (penalty scored); Olunga (penalty scored); Nam Tae-hee (penalty scored); Muntari (penalty scored); Mohammed (penalty scored); Al-Rawi (penalty scored); Boudiaf (penalty scored)	7–6	(penalty scored) Vargas; (penalty scored) Boli; (penalty scored) N'Zonzi; (penalty scored) Taniguchi; (penalty scored) Masoud; (penalty scored) Tombari; (penalty missed) Awad

Al Thumama Stadium, Doha
Attendance: 700
Referee: Yusuke Araki (Japan)

20 February 2023
18:00 UTC+3

Al-Faisaly (Saudi Arabian Football Federation)	0–1	(Football Federation Islamic Republic of Iran) Foolad
	Report	Ansari 64'

Al Thumama Stadium, Doha
Attendance: 632
Referee: Ahmed Al-Kaf (Oman)

=== East Region ===
18 August 2022
17:00 UTC+9

Daegu FC (Korea Football Association)	1–2 (a.e.t.)	(Korea Football Association) Jeonbuk Hyundai Motors
Zeca 56'	Report	Song Min-kyu 46'; Kim Jin-gyu 120+1'

Urawa Komaba Stadium, Saitama
Attendance: 463
Referee: Mohammed Abdulla Hassan Mohamed (United Arab Emirates)

19 August 2022
17:00 UTC+9

BG Pathum United (Football Association of Thailand)	4–0	(Football Association of Hong Kong, China) Kitchee
Worachit 34'; Ikhsan 39'; Teerasil 68'; Chatmongkol 87'	Report

Urawa Komaba Stadium, Saitama
Attendance: 258
Referee: Adham Makhadmeh (Jordan)

19 August 2022
20:00 UTC+9

Johor Darul Ta'zim (Football Association of Malaysia)	0–5	(Japan Football Association) Urawa Red Diamonds
	Report	Scholz 8' (pen.); Karlsson 19', 39'; Junker 84', 90+1'

Saitama Stadium 2002, Saitama
Attendance: 20,691
Referee: Chris Beath (Australia)

18 August 2022
20:00 UTC+9

Vissel Kobe (Japan Football Association)	3–2	(Japan Football Association) Yokohama F. Marinos
Iino 7'; Sasaki 31' (pen.); Oda 80'	Report	Nishimura 9'; Lopes 89'

Saitama Stadium 2002, Saitama
Attendance: 11,528
Referee: Alireza Faghani (Iran)

== Quarter-finals ==
=== Summary ===
The quarter-finals were played over one leg.

West Region
Team 1	Score	Team 2
Al-Duhail (Qatar)	2–1	(Saudi Arabia) Al-Shabab
Foolad (Iran)	0–1	(Saudi Arabia) Al-Hilal

East Region
Team 1	Score	Team 2
Vissel Kobe (Japan)	1–3 (a.e.t.)	(South Korea) Jeonbuk Hyundai Motors
Urawa Red Diamonds (Japan)	4–0	(Thailand) BG Pathum United

=== West Region ===
23 February 2023
18:00 UTC+3

Al-Duhail (Qatar Football Association)	2–1	(Saudi Arabian Football Federation) Al-Shabab
Olunga 77', 85'	Report	Al-Rubaie 90+3'

Al Thumama Stadium, Doha
Attendance: 7,138
Referee: Mohanad Qasim Sarray (Iraq)

23 February 2023
21:00 UTC+3

Foolad (Football Federation Islamic Republic of Iran)	0–1	(Saudi Arabian Football Federation) Al-Hilal
	Report	Marega 87'

Al Janoub Stadium, Al Wakrah
Attendance: 14,173
Referee: Hiroyuki Kimura (Japan)

=== East Region ===
22 August 2022
16:00 UTC+9

Vissel Kobe (Japan Football Association)	1–3 (a.e.t.)	(Korea Football Association) Jeonbuk Hyundai Motors
Yuruki 64'	Report	Barrow 66'; Gustavo 104'; Moon Seon-min 120+2'

Saitama Stadium 2002, Saitama
Attendance: 7,861
Referee: Abdulrahman Al-Jassim (Qatar)

22 August 2022
20:00 UTC+9

Urawa Red Diamonds (Japan Football Association)	4–0	(Football Association of Thailand) BG Pathum United
Karlsson 32'; Iwanami 42'; Koizumi 65'; Akimoto 72'	Report

Saitama Stadium 2002, Saitama
Attendance: 16,210
Referee: Mohammed Al-Hoish (Saudi Arabia)

== Semi-finals ==
=== Summary ===
The semi-finals were played over one leg.

West Region
Team 1	Score	Team 2
Al-Duhail (Qatar)	0–7	(Saudi Arabia) Al-Hilal

East Region
Team 1	Score	Team 2
Jeonbuk Hyundai Motors (South Korea)	2–2 (a.e.t.) (1–3 p)	(Japan) Urawa Red Diamonds

=== West Region ===
26 February 2023
18:00 UTC+3

Al-Duhail (Qatar Football Association)	0–7	(Saudi Arabian Football Federation) Al-Hilal
	Report	Ighalo 2', 10', 48', 62'; Marega 14', 27'; S. Al-Dawsari 38'

Al Thumama Stadium, Doha
Attendance: 16,320
Referee: Ko Hyung-jin (South Korea)

=== East Region ===
25 August 2022
19:30 UTC+9

Jeonbuk Hyundai Motors (Korea Football Association)	2–2 (a.e.t.)	(Japan Football Association) Urawa Red Diamonds
Paik Seung-ho 55' (pen.); Han Kyo-won 116'	Report	Matsuo 11'; Junker 120'
Penalties
Kim Bo-kyung (penalty missed); Lee Seung-gi (penalty missed); Park Jin-seop (penalty scored); Kim Jin-su (penalty missed)	1–3	(penalty scored) Scholz; (penalty scored) Junker; (penalty missed) Karlsson; (penalty scored) Esaka

Saitama Stadium 2002, Saitama
Attendance: 23,277
Referee: Alireza Faghani (Iran)

== Final ==
The final was played over two legs.

29 April 2023
20:30 UTC+3

Al-Hilal (Saudi Arabian Football Federation)	1–1	(Japan Football Association) Urawa Red Diamonds
S. Al-Dawsari 13'	Report	Koroki 53'

King Fahd International Stadium, Riyadh
Attendance: 50,881
Referee: Ahmed Al-Kaf (Oman)
6 May 2023
18:00 UTC+9

Urawa Red Diamonds (Japan Football Association)	1–0	(Saudi Arabian Football Federation) Al-Hilal
Carrillo 48' (o.g.)	Report

Saitama Stadium 2002, Saitama
Attendance: 53,574
Referee: Ma Ning (China)

Urawa Red Diamonds won 2–1 on aggregate.
