= 2018 J.League Cup final =

2018ＪリーグYBCルヴァンカップ 決勝
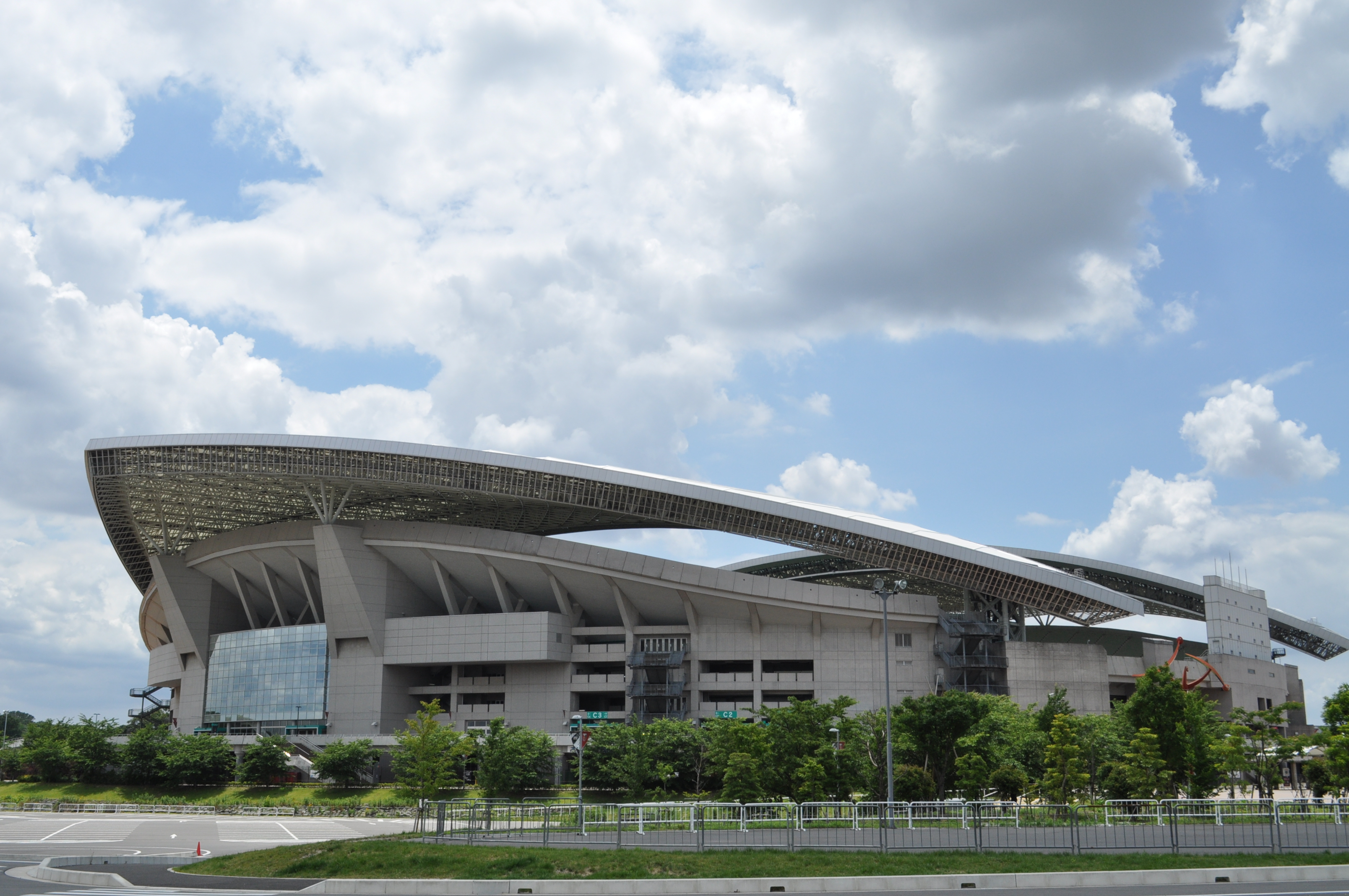
- The match took place at Saitama Stadium 2002
- Event: 2018 J.League Cup
| Shonan Bellmare | Yokohama F. Marinos |
| 1 | 0 |
- Date: October 27, 2018
- Venue: Saitama Stadium 2002, Saitama
- Referee: Hiroyuki Kimura
- Attendance: 44,242
- Weather: Fine, 20.7 °C (69 °F)

The 2018 J.League Cup final was an association football match between Shonan Bellmare and Yokohama F. Marinos on 27 October 2018 at Saitama Stadium 2002. It was the 26th edition J.League Cup, organised by the J.League. Shonan Bellmare won the championship. The winners earned the right to play against the winners of the 2018 Copa Sudamericana in the 2019 J.League Cup / Copa Sudamericana Championship.

== Match details ==
October 27, 2018
13:10 JST

| Shonan Bellmare | 1–0 | Yokohama F. Marinos |
|---|---|---|
| Daiki Sugioka 36' | Report |

Saitama Stadium 2002
Attendance: 44,242
Referee: Hiroyuki Kimura

Shonan Bellmare
| GK | 1 | (Japan) Yota Akimoto |
| DF | 13 | (Japan) Miki Yamane |
| DF | 20 | (Japan) Keisuke Saka |
| DF | 8 | (Japan) Kazunari Ono |
| MF | 36 | (Japan) Takuya Okamoto |
| MF | 34 | (Japan) Daiki Kaneko |
| MF | 10 | (Japan) Hiroki Akino | (substituted off) 71' |
| MF | 29 | (Japan) Daiki Sugioka |
| FW | 6 | (Japan) Toshiki Ishikawa |
| FW | 38 | (Japan) Ryogo Yamasaki |
| FW | 7 | (Japan) Tsukasa Umesaki | (substituted off) 77' |
Substitutes:
| GK | 21 | (Japan) Daiki Tomii |
| DF | 4 | (Brazil) André Bahia |
| MF | 41 | (Croatia) Mihael Mikić |
| FW | 2 | (Japan) Shunsuke Kikuchi | (substituted in) 87' |
| FW | 9 | (South Korea) Lee Jeong-hyeop |
| FW | 18 | (Japan) Temma Matsuda | (substituted in) 71' | (substituted off) 87' |
| FW | 23 | (Japan) Kaoru Takayama | (substituted in) 77' |
Manager:
(South Korea) Cho Kwi-jea

Yokohama F. Marinos
| GK | 21 | (Japan) Hiroki Iikura |
| DF | 27 | (Japan) Ken Matsubara |
| DF | 13 | (Brazil) Thiago Martins |
| DF | 2 | (Serbia) Dušan Cvetinović |
| DF | 24 | (Japan) Ryosuke Yamanaka |
| MF | 6 | (Japan) Takahiro Ogihara |
| MF | 9 | (Japan) Yuki Otsu | (substituted off) 78' |
| MF | 14 | (Japan) Jun Amano |
| FW | 19 | (Japan) Teruhito Nakagawa |
| FW | 7 | (Portugal) Hugo Vieira |
| FW | 25 | (South Korea) Yun Il-lok | (substituted off) 69' |
Substitutes:
| GK | 30 | (Japan) Ayaki Suzuki |
| DF | 4 | (Japan) Yuzo Kurihara |
| DF | 44 | (Japan) Shinnosuke Hatanaka |
| MF | 5 | (Japan) Takuya Kida |
| MF | 8 | (Japan) Kosuke Nakamachi |
| FW | 16 | (Japan) Sho Ito | (substituted in) 78' |
| FW | 26 | (Japan) Ippei Shinozuka | (substituted in) 69' |
Manager:
(Australia) Ange Postecoglou

== See also ==
- 2018 J.League Cup
