= 2019 J.League Cup / Copa Sudamericana Championship =

Shonan Bellmare	Athletico Paranaense
(Japan)	(Brazil)
0	4
- Date: 7 August 2019
- Venue: Shonan BMW Stadium Hiratsuka, Hiratsuka
- Referee: Muhammad Taqi (Singapore)
- Attendance: 9,129
- Weather: Sunny; 29.6 °C (85.3 °F); 74% humidity

The 2019 J.League Cup / Copa Sudamericana Championship, officially known as the 2019 J. League YBC Levain Cup / CONMEBOL Sudamericana Championship Final (Japanese: JリーグYBCルヴァンカップ/CONMEBOLスダメリカーナ 王者決定戦2019 KANAGAWA), was the 12th edition of the J.League Cup / Copa Sudamericana Championship (previously referred to as the Suruga Bank Championship until 2018), the club football match co-organized by the Japan Football Association, the football governing body of Japan, CONMEBOL, the football governing body of South America, and J.League, the professional football league of Japan, between the champions of the previous season's J.League Cup and Copa Sudamericana.

The match was contested between Japanese team Shonan Bellmare, the 2018 J.League Cup champions, and Brazilian team Athletico Paranaense, the 2018 Copa Sudamericana champions. It was hosted by Shonan Bellmare at the Shonan BMW Stadium Hiratsuka in Hiratsuka on 7 August 2019.

Athletico Paranaense won the match 4–0 to win their first title.

== Teams ==
Team	Association / Confederation	Qualification	Previous appearances
(Japan) Shonan Bellmare	Japan Football Association	2018 J.League Cup champions	None
(Brazil) Athletico Paranaense	CONMEBOL	2018 Copa Sudamericana champions	None

== Venue ==
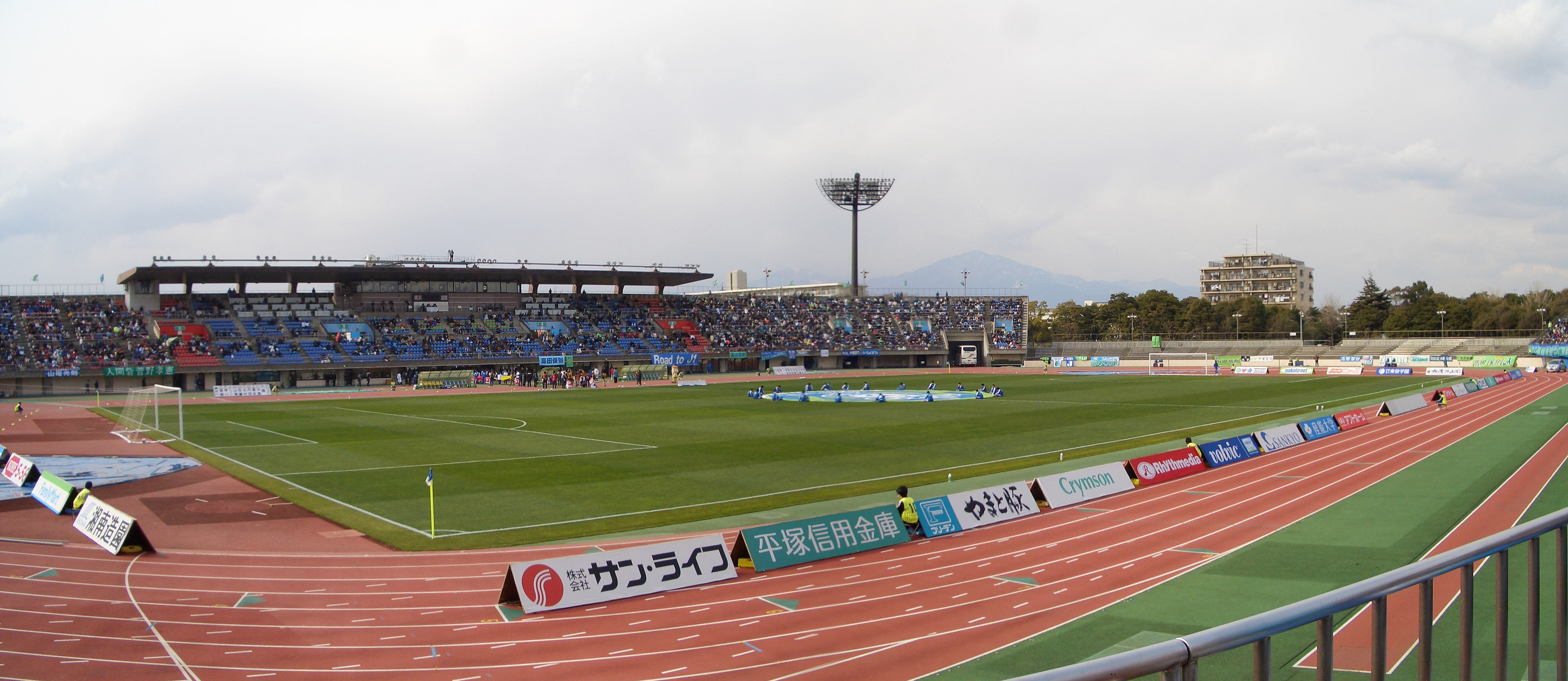
Shonan BMW Stadium Hiratsuka in Hiratsuka, Japan, hosted the match.

== Format ==
The J.League Cup / Copa Sudamericana Championship was played as a single match, with the J.League Cup winners hosting the match. If tied at the end of regulation, extra time would not be played, and the penalty shoot-out would be used to determine the winner.

== Match ==
=== Details ===
7 August 2019
19:00 UTC+9

Shonan Bellmare (Japan)	0–4	(Brazil) Athletico Paranaense
	Report (JFA); Report (J.League); Report (CONMEBOL)	Marcelo Cirino 41'; Rony 56'; Thonny Anderson 63'; Romero 85'

Shonan BMW Stadium Hiratsuka, Hiratsuka
Attendance: 9,129
Referee: Muhammad Taqi (Singapore)

Shonan; Bellmare	Athletico; Paranaense

GK	25	(Japan) Shuhei Matsubara
RCB	6	(Japan) Takuya Okamoto	(substituted off) 46'
CB	3	(Brazil) Leandro Freire
LCB	23	(Japan) Masahito Onoda
RM	44	(Japan) Shunya Mori
CM	18	(Japan) Temma Matsuda	(substituted off) 66'
CM	19	(Japan) Daiki Kaneko (c)
LM	28	(Japan) Toichi Suzuki	(substituted off) 46'
AM	36	(Turkey) Ömer Tokaç	(substituted off) 60'
AM	10	(Japan) Naoki Yamada	(substituted off) 46'
CF	9	(Japan) Hiroshi Ibusuki	(substituted off) 54'
Substitutes:
GK	31	(Japan) Kota Sanada
DF	5	(Japan) Daiki Sugioka	(substituted on) 46'
MF	7	(Japan) Tsukasa Umesaki	(substituted on) 60'
MF	16	(Japan) Mitsuki Saito	(substituted on) 46'
MF	50	(Japan) Shota Kobayashi	(substituted on) 46'
FW	20	(Brazil) Crislan	(substituted on) 54'
FW	33	(Japan) Yamato Wakatsuki	(substituted on) 66'
Manager:
(South Korea) Cho Kwi-jea

GK	1	(Brazil) Santos
RB	2	(Brazil) Jonathan	(substituted off) 69'
CB	34	(Brazil) Pedro Henrique	(substituted off) 76'
CB	4	(Brazil) Léo Pereira
LB	6	(Brazil) Márcio Azevedo
CM	5	(Brazil) Wellington (c)	(substituted off) 76'
CM	39	(Brazil) Bruno Guimarães
RW	10	(Brazil) Marcelo Cirino
AM	77	(Brazil) Bruno Nazário	(substituted off) 60'
LW	7	(Brazil) Rony	(substituted off) 69'
CF	9	(Argentina) Marco Ruben	(substituted off) 60'
Substitutes:
GK	25	(Brazil) Caio
DF	21	(Brazil) Lucas Halter	(substituted on) 76'
DF	23	(Brazil) Mádson	(substituted on) 69'
MF	3	(Argentina) Lucho González	(substituted on) 76'
MF	8	(Argentina) Tomás Andrade
MF	18	(Brazil) Léo Cittadini
MF	38	(Brazil) Thonny Anderson	(substituted on) 60'
FW	17	(Argentina) Braian Romero	(substituted on) 69'
FW	11	(Brazil) Nikão	(substituted on) 60'
Manager:
(Brazil) Tiago Nunes

Assistant referees:
Abdul Hannan Bin Abdul Hasim (Singapore)
Ong Chai Lee (Singapore)
Fourth official:
Letchman Gopala Krishnan (Singapore)

Match rules

- 90 minutes.
- Penalty shoot-out if scores level.
- Nine named substitutes, of which up to six may be used.

== See also ==
- 2018 J.League Cup Final
- 2018 Copa Sudamericana Finals
