= 2021 Vietnamese Cup =

Bamboo Airways National Cup 2021

Tournament details
- Country: Vietnam
- Dates: 23–25 April 2021 (Remaining matches cancelled)
- Teams: 27

Final positions
- Champions: Not awarded

Tournament statistics
- Matches played: 11
- Goals scored: 27 (2.45 per match)
- Attendance: 24,000 (2,182 per match)

The 2021 Vietnamese Cup (known as the Bamboo Airways National Cup for sponsorship reasons) was the 29th edition of the Vietnamese National Cup, the football knockout tournament of Vietnam organized by the Vietnam Football Federation.

Only the first round was completed, after disruptions to the event due to an outbreak of the delta variant of the coronavirus in the country. After a meeting with all teams on August 21, the event was officially cancelled, with the slot for the 2022 AFC Champions League to be determined at a later stage.

== First round ==
Five teams (Than Quang Ninh FC, Ho Chi Minh City FC, Viettel Football Club, Hanoi FC and Nam Dinh FC) received a bye in the first round.

23 April 2021	Can Tho FC	1–1 (4–2 p)	Binh Duong	Cần Thơ
17:00	Vũ Mạnh Duy 31'	Report	Nguyễn Thanh Thảo 86'	Stadium: Can Tho Stadium; Referee: Trần Văn Lập
	Penalties
	Thành Công; Quốc Việt (penalty scored); Thành Công (penalty scored); Như Tứ (penalty scored)		Tiến Linh (penalty scored); Trọng Huy (penalty scored); Anh Tỷ (penalty missed); Thanh Long (penalty missed)

23 April 2021	Da Nang	1–0	Ba Ria Vung Tau	Đà Nẵng
17:00	Hà Đức Chinh 62'	Report		Stadium: Hoa Xuan Stadium; Referee: Khổng Tam Cường

23 April 2021	Hoang Anh Gia Lai FC	2–1	An Giang	Pleiku
17:00	Vũ Văn Thanh 86' (pen.); Nguyễn Trung Đại Dương 90'	Report	Trần Văn Hợp 72'	Stadium: Pleiku Stadium; Referee: Dương Hữu Phúc

23 April 2021	Hong Linh Ha Tinh FC	4–2	Cong An	Hà Tĩnh
18:00	Đào Văn Nam 23' (pen.); Lê Văn Nam 29'; Nguyễn Văn Đức 55'; Nguyễn Văn Huy 75'	Report	Lê Minh Bình 4', 89'	Stadium: Ha Tinh Stadium; Referee: Lê Đức Cảnh

23 April 2021	Pho Hien FC	1–0	Song Lam Nghe An FC	Văn Giang
18:00	Lâm Thuận 53'	Report		Stadium: PVF Stadium; Referee: Trần Trung Hiếu

24 April 2021	Dak Lak FC	3–0	Thanh Hoa FC	Buôn Ma Thuột
15:30	Trần Ngọc Ánh 13'; Đỗ Xuân Thi 41' (pen.); Lương Thanh Ngọc Lâm 58'	Report		Stadium: Buon Ma Thuot Stadium; Referee: Ngô Đức Việt

24 April 2021	Quang Nam	3–2	Saigon FC	Tam Kỳ
17:00	Đinh Thanh Trung 31'; Nguyễn Hữu Sơn 77'; Hà Minh Tuấn 79'	Report	Nguyễn Hoàng Quốc Chí 37'; Võ Nguyên Hoàng 68'	Stadium: Tam Ky Stadium; Referee: Nguyễn Trọng Thư

24 April 2021	Binh Dinh FC	1–2	Long An FC	Quy Nhơn
17:00	Đinh Tiến Thành 55'	Report	Cù Nguyễn Khánh 67'; Phan Nhật Thanh Long 90+4'	Stadium: Quy Nhon Stadium; Referee: Trần Văn Lập

24 April 2021	Hai Phong FC	0–0 (4–3 p)	Binh Phuoc FC	Hải Phòng
18:00		Report		Stadium: Lach Tray Stadium; Referee: Vũ Phúc Hoan
	Penalties
	Lâm Qúi (penalty scored); Phú Nguyên (penalty scored); Mạnh Dũng (penalty missed); Trung Hiếu (penalty scored); Văn Hạnh (penalty scored)		Văn Sáu (penalty scored); Tuấn Anh (penalty scored); Văn Việt (penalty scored); Xuân Hướng (penalty missed); Thanh Phong (penalty missed)

25 April 2021	Phu Dong FC	1–0	Hue FC	Thanh Trì
16:00	Mạch Ngọc Hà 63'	Report		Stadium: Thanh Trì Stadium

25 April 2021	Khanh Hoa FC	2–0	Phu Tho FC	Nha Trang
17:00		Report		Stadium: 19/8 Stadium
