= Yoshio Koizumi =

Japanese footballer (born 1996)

Yoshio Koizumi 小泉 佳穂
Personal information
- Full name: Yoshio Koizumi
- Date of birth: 5 October 1996 (age 30)
- Place of birth: Tokyo, Japan
- Height: 1.72 m (5 ft 8 in)
- Position: Attacking midfielder

Team information
- Current team: Kashiwa Reysol
- Number: 8

Youth career
- 2009–2011: FC Tokyo Musashi
- 2012–2014: Maebashi Ikuei High School

College career
Years	Team	Apps	(Gls)
2015–2018	Aoyama Gakuin University		

Senior career*
Years	Team	Apps	(Gls)
2019–2020	FC Ryukyu	50	(6)
2021–2024	Urawa Red Diamonds	107	(6)
2025–	Kashiwa Reysol	55	(11)
- * Club domestic league appearances and goals as of 10 August 2026

Yoshio Koizumi (小泉 佳穂, Koizumi Yoshio; born 5 October 1996) is a Japanese professional footballer who plays as an attacking midfielder for J1 League club Kashiwa Reysol.

== Career ==
In January 2025, it was announced that Koizumi would be joining J1 League club Kashiwa Reysol after four seasons with Urawa Red Diamonds.

== Career statistics ==
As of end of 2024 season

Appearances and goals by club, season and competition
Club	Season	League			National cup (Note: Includes Emperor's Cup)		League cup (Note: Includes J.League Cup)		Continental		Total	
Club	Season	Division	Apps	Goals	Apps	Goals	Apps	Goals	Apps	Goals	Apps	Goals
FC Ryukyu	2019	J2 League	12	0	1	0	—		—		13	0
FC Ryukyu	2020	J2 League	38	6	—		—		—		38	6
FC Ryukyu	Total		50	6	1	0	0	0	0	0	51	6
Urawa Red Diamonds	2021	J1 League	34	2	5	1	8	1	—		47	4
Urawa Red Diamonds	2022	J1 League	27	3	0	0	4	1	7 (Note: Appearances in the AFC Champions League)	2	38	6
Urawa Red Diamonds	2023	J1 League	26	1	1	0	8	0	12 (Note: Three appearances in the FIFA Club World Cup)	1	47	2
Urawa Red Diamonds	2024	J1 League	20	0	0	0	1	0	—		21	0
Urawa Red Diamonds	Total		107	6	6	1	21	2	19	3	153	12
Total			157	12	7	1	21	2	19	3	204	18

== Honours ==
Urawa Red Diamonds

- Emperor's Cup: 2021
- AFC Champions League: 2022

Individual

- J.League Best XI: 2025
