= Thonny Anderson =

Brazilian footballer

Personal information
- Full name: Thonny Anderson da Silva Carvalho
- Date of birth: 27 December 1997 (age 28)
- Place of birth: São Paulo, Brazil
- Height: 1.84 m (6 ft 0 in)
- Position: Attacking midfielder

Team information
- Current team: Tokushima Vortis
- Number: 9

Youth career
- 2007: São Paulo
- 2007–2015: Osasco Audax
- 2015–2018: Cruzeiro

Senior career*
Years	Team	Apps	(Gls)
2017	Cruzeiro	0	(0)
2018	→ Grêmio (loan)	24	(5)
2019	Grêmio	6	(1)
2019	→ Athletico Paranaense (loan)	23	(3)
2020–2024	Red Bull Bragantino	15	(1)
2021	→ Bahia (loan)	12	(0)
2022	→ Coritiba (loan)	32	(0)
2023	→ Ferroviária (loan)	6	(0)
2023	→ ABC (loan)	25	(5)
2024	→ Ituano (loan)	27	(5)
2025–	Tokushima Vortis	45	(8)
- * Club domestic league appearances and goals as of 14 August 2026

Thonny Anderson da Silva Carvalho (born 27 December 1997), known as Thonny Anderson, is a Brazilian professional footballer who plays as an attacking midfielder and currently play for Tokushima Vortis.

== Club career ==
Born in São Paulo, Anderson joined the youth setup of São Paulo FC in 2007, but soon moved to Osasco Audax. Although he initially played as a defender at the latter club, he later became a midfielder and started training with the senior team at the age of 16. In 2015, he signed for the under-17 team of Cruzeiro. Two years later, he captained the under-20 team in their league winning 2017 Brasileiro under-20 campaign and scored three goals in 13 matches. In the same year, he also captained Cruzeiro's 2017 Supercopa do Brasil under-20 winning team.

On 9 January 2018, Anderson was loaned out to Grêmio for the upcoming season. Fifteen days later, he made his debut, coming on as a substitute for Pepê in a 3–2 defeat against Avenida, in Campeonato Gaúcho. On 18 February, he scored his first goal for the club in a 2–1 defeat against Veranópolis.

On 9 May 2019, Anderson joined Athletico Paranaense on loan for the remainder of the season.

After loan five clubs in Série A and Série B respectively, Anderson left from the club after Red Bull Bragantino expire contract in five years since 2020.

On 5 January 2025, Anderson abroad to Japan for the first time and joined to J2 club, Tokushima Vortis for 2025 season.

== Career statistics ==
As of the start from 2025 season.

Appearances and goals by club, season and competition
Club	Season	League			State League		National Cup		Continental		Other		Total	
Club	Season	Division	Apps	Goals	Apps	Goals	Apps	Goals	Apps	Goals	Apps	Goals	Apps	Goals
Grêmio	2018	Série A	16	3	8	2	2	0	6 (Note: Appearance(s) in Copa Libertadores)	0	0	0	32	5
Grêmio	2019	Série A	0	0	6	1	0	0	0	0	—		6	1
Grêmio	Total		16	3	14	3	2	0	6	0	0	0	38	6
Athletico Paranaense (loan)	2019	Série A	23	3	—		2	0	—		2 (Note: One appearance in Recopa Sudamericana, one appearance and one goal in J.League Cup / Copa Sudamericana Championship)	1	27	4
Red Bull Bragantino	2020	Série A	8	1	7	0	1	0	—				16	1
Bahia (loan)	2021	Série A	12	0	0	0	3	0	5 (Note: Appearance(s) in Copa Sudamericana)	1	2 (Note: Appearance(s) in Copa do Nordeste)	0	22	1
Coritiba (loan)	2022	Série A	18	0	12	0	2	0	–				32	0
Ferroviária (loan)	2023	Série A	0	0	6	0	–						6	0
ABC (loan)	2023	Série B	23	5	0	0	0	0	0	0	2 (Note: Appearance(s) in Campeonato Potiguar)	0	25	5
Ituano (loan)	2024	Série B	27	5	9	0	1	0	–				37	5
Tokushima Vortis	2025	J2 League	0	0	–		0	0	–		0	0	0	0
Career total			59	7	21	3	8	0	11	1	4	1	103	12

== Honours ==
Atlético Paranaense

- J.League Cup / Copa Sudamericana Championship: 2019
- Copa do Brasil: 2019
