= 2018 J.League Cup =

2018 J. League Cup
2018 JリーグYBCルヴァンカップ

Tournament details
- Country: Japan
- Dates: 7 March – 27 October 2018
- Teams: 20

Final positions
- Champions: Shonan Bellmare (1st title)
- Runners-up: Yokohama F. Marinos

Tournament statistics
- Matches played: 69
- Goals scored: 207 (3 per match)
- Top goal scorer: Sho Ito

The 2018 J.League Cup (2018 Jリーグカップ), or officially the 2018 J.League YBC Levain Cup (2018 JリーグYBCルヴァンカップ), was the 43rd edition of the Japanese football league cup tournament and the 26th edition under the current J. League Cup format.

The winners earned the right to play against the winners of the 2018 Copa Sudamericana in the 2019 J.League Cup / Copa Sudamericana Championship.

== Format ==
Byes
Teams that qualified for 2018 AFC Champions League group stage (3 or 4 teams) are given byes to the quarterfinals.
Group stage
The group stage was played by 16 teams, consisting of all other 2018 J1 League participants (14 or 15 teams) plus top 1 or 2 2018 J2 League participants based on the ranking of the previous season (i.e., 16th-placed team, and 17th-placed team if applicable, of 2017 J1 League).
Play-off stage
Play-off stage was played as four or five two-legged ties (number depending on the number of teams given byes to the quarterfinals so that eight teams play the quarterfinals).
- If four teams are given byes to the quarterfinals, eight teams (top two teams of each group) advances to the play-off stage and composes four ties.
- If three teams are given byes to the quarterfinals, ten teams (top two teams of each group, plus two best third-placed teams among four groups) advances to the play-off stage and composes five ties.

After the play-off stage where eight teams are active, quarterfinals (two-legged), semi finals (two-legged) and the final (single match) were played.

== Group stage ==
Played between March 7 & May 16.

=== Tiebreakers ===
To determine the ranking of a group, teams with the same points are ranked by the following criteria:

1. Points in the matches between the teams in question,
2. Goal differences in the matches between the teams in question,
3. Number of goals in the matches between the teams in question,
4. Number of away goals in the matches between the teams in question.
5. In case there are still two or more tied teams by the criteria above, re-apply them for only the tied teams. If the process does not classify teams anymore, see the following criteria.
6. Goal differences in all group matches,
7. Number of goals in all group matches,
8. Penalty shoot-out (only if just two teams are tied, and they play the last group match)
9. Fewer disciplinary points,
10. Drawing of lots.

To determine the best third-placed teams (if needed), teams with the same points are ranked by the following criteria:

1. Goal differences in all group matches,
2. Number of goals in all group matches,
3. Fewer disciplinary points,
4. Drawing of lots.

=== Group A ===
Pos	Team	Pld	W	D	L	GF	GA	GD	Pts	VEG	YMA	ALB	TOK
1	Vegalta Sendai	6	3	2	1	10	6	+4	11	—	4–2	1–1	3–0
2	Yokohama F. Marinos	6	3	2	1	10	8	+2	11	0–0	—	2–1	1–0
3	Albirex Niigata	6	2	1	3	9	10	−1	7	3–1	1–3	—	3–2
4	FC Tokyo	6	1	1	4	5	10	−5	4	0–1	2–2	1–0	—

Source: Group A League table

=== Group B ===
Pos	Team	Pld	W	D	L	GF	GA	GD	Pts	JÚB	VEN	SSP	CON
1	Júbilo Iwata	6	4	0	2	9	7	+2	12	—	3–2	2–1	2–3
2	Ventforet Kofu	6	3	1	2	10	5	+5	10	0–1	—	1–0	3–0
3	Shimizu S-Pulse	6	3	1	2	8	5	+3	10	1–0	1–1	—	2–1
4	Hokkaido Consadole Sapporo	6	1	0	5	4	14	−10	3	0–1	0–3	0–3	—

Source: Group B League table

=== Group C ===
Pos	Team	Pld	W	D	L	GF	GA	GD	Pts	RED	GAM	SFR	GRA
1	Urawa Red Diamonds	6	4	1	1	9	5	+4	13	—	1–4	1–0	2–0
2	Gamba Osaka	6	3	0	3	12	13	−1	9	0–1	—	0–4	1–4
3	Sanfrecce Hiroshima	6	2	1	3	9	7	+2	7	0–0	2–3	—	2–1
4	Nagoya Grampus	6	2	0	4	9	14	−5	6	1–4	1–4	2–1	—

Source: Group C League table

=== Group D ===
Pos	Team	Pld	W	D	L	GF	GA	GD	Pts	VIS	BEL	VVN	SAG
1	Vissel Kobe	6	3	2	1	14	8	+6	11	—	3–4	2–2	1–1
2	Shonan Bellmare	6	3	1	2	8	8	0	10	0–3	—	2–0	1–0
3	V-Varen Nagasaki	6	2	1	3	9	11	−2	7	1–2	2–1	—	3–2
4	Sagan Tosu	6	1	2	3	5	8	−3	5	0–2	0–0	2–1	—

Source: Group D League table

== Bracket ==
Play-off stage
1	Ventforet Kofu	2	1	3
16	Urawa Red Diamonds	0	2	2
8	Kashiwa Reysol
9	Bye
5	Shonan Bellmare	3	1	4
12	Vegalta Sendai	0	3	3
4	Cerezo Osaka
13	Bye
6	Kashima Antlers
11	Bye
3	Kawasaki Frontale
14	Bye
7	Gamba Osaka	1	3	4
10	Júbilo Iwata	0	2	2
2	Yokohama F. Marinos	4	1	5
15	Vissel Kobe	2	1	3

Quarterfinals
Ventforet Kofu	2	1	3
Kashiwa Reysol (a)	2	1	3
Shonan Bellmare	3	2	5
Cerezo Osaka	0	2	2
Kashima Antlers	1	3	4
Kawasaki Frontale	1	1	2
Gamba Osaka	0	1	1
Yokohama F. Marinos	4	3	7

Semifinals
Kashiwa Reysol	1	2	3 (4)
Shonan Bellmare (p)	1	2	3 (5)
Kashima Antlers	1	2	3
Yokohama F. Marinos	2	2	4

Final
Shonan Bellmare	1
Yokohama F. Marinos	0

== Play-off stage ==
In each tie (two-legged tie) of play-offs, quarterfinals or semifinals, away goals rule is applied for goals in the regular playing time, but not in the extra time.

Played on June 2 & 9.

Team 1	Agg.	Team 2	1st leg	2nd leg
Shonan Bellmare	4–3	Vegalta Sendai	3–0	1–3
Gamba Osaka	4–2	Júbilo Iwata	1–0	3–2
Ventforet Kofu	3–2	Urawa Red Diamonds	2–0	1–2
Yokohama F. Marinos	5–3	Vissel Kobe	4–2	1–1

== Quarterfinals ==
Played on September 5 & 9.

Team 1	Agg.	Team 2	1st leg	2nd leg
Shonan Bellmare	5–2	Cerezo Osaka	3–0	2–2
Ventforet Kofu	3–3 (a)	Kashiwa Reysol	2–2	1–1
Gamba Osaka	1–7	Yokohama F. Marinos	0–4	1–3
Kashima Antlers	4–2	Kawasaki Frontale	1–1	3–1

=== First leg ===
5 September 2018	Shonan Bellmare	3–0	Cerezo Osaka	Shonan BMW Stadium, Hiratsuka
19:03	Matsuda 28'; Umesaki 70'; Kaneko 75'			Attendance: 5,896; Referee: M. Okabe

5 September 2018	Ventforet Kofu	2–2	Kashiwa Reysol	Yamanashi Chuo Stadium, Kōfu
19:03	Nakayama 54'; Soneda 69'		63' Nakagawa; 85' Cristiano	Attendance: 4,157; Referee: M. Fukushima

5 September 2018	Gamba Osaka	0–4	Yokohama F. Marinos	Panasonic Stadium Suita, Suita
19:03			2', 40' Ito; 74' Ōtsu; 75' Nakagawa	Attendance: 5,792; Referee: M. Nishimura

5 September 2018	Kashima Antlers	1–1	Kawasaki Frontale	Kashima Soccer Stadium, Kashima
19:04	Nishi 19'		32' (pen.) Chinen	Attendance: 7,145; Referee: M. Īda

=== Second leg ===
9 September 2018	Cerezo Osaka	2–2	Shonan Bellmare	Yanmar Stadium Nagai, Osaka
19:03	Takagi 25'; Souza 35'		31' Kaneko; 44' (pen.) Yamasaki	Attendance: 6,589; Referee: M. Iemoto

9 September 2018	Yokohama F. Marinos	3–1	Gamba Osaka	Nissan Stadium, Yokohama
19:03	Nakagawa 12'; Ito 20' (pen.), 85'		52' Ichimi	Attendance: 11,207; Referee: M. Araki

9 September 2018	Kawasaki Frontale	1–3	Kashima Antlers	Ajinomoto Stadium, Chōfu
19:03	Abe 51' (pen.)		28', 37' Yamamoto; 72' Serginho	Attendance: 19,214; Referee: M. Yamamoto

== Semifinals ==
Played on October 10 & 14.

Team 1	Agg.	Team 2	1st leg	2nd leg
Kashiwa Reysol	3–3 (4–5 p)	Shonan Bellmare	1–1	2–2 (a.e.t.)
Kashima Antlers	3–4	Yokohama F. Marinos	1–2	2–2

=== First leg ===
10 October 2018	Kashiwa Reysol	1–1	Shonan Bellmare	Hitachi Kashiwa Stadium, Kashiwa
19:04	Segawa 1'	Report	Kikuchi 9'	Attendance: 5,665; Referee: M. Nishimura

10 October 2018	Kashima Antlers	1–2	Yokohama F. Marinos	Kashima Soccer Stadium, Kashima
19:03	Inukai 90+4'	Report	Amano 77'; Vieira 90+5'	Attendance: 8,421; Referee: M. Matsuo

=== Second leg ===
14 October 2018	Shonan Bellmare	2–2 (a.e.t.) (5–4 p)	Kashiwa Reysol	Shonan BMW Stadium, Hiratsuka
16:03	Ishikawa 28'; Saka 93'	Report	Otani 70'; Yamazaki 113'	Attendance: 13,018; Referee: M. Tōjō
	Penalties
	Sugioka (penalty scored); Yamasaki (penalty scored); Umesaki (penalty missed); Saka (penalty scored); Kaneko (penalty scored); Takayama (penalty scored)		(penalty scored) Cristiano; (penalty scored) Nakayama; (penalty scored) Tezuka; (penalty missed) Esaka; (penalty scored) Suzuki; (penalty missed) Yamazaki

14 October 2018	Yokohama F. Marinos	2–2	Kashima Antlers	Nissan Stadium, Yokohama
14:04	Vieira 20'; Nakagawa 34'	Report	Doi 62'; Serginho 70'	Attendance: 12,979; Referee: M. Satō

== Final ==
27 October 2018	Shonan Bellmare	1–0	Yokohama F. Marinos	Saitama Stadium 2002, Saitama
13:05	Sugioka 36'	Report		Attendance: 44,242; Referee: M. Kimura

== Top goalscorers ==
As of match played 27 October 2018.

Rank	Player	Club	Goals
1	(Japan) Sho Ito	Yokohama F. Marinos	8
2	(Japan) Shun Nagasawa	Vissel Kobe	7
3	(Portugal) Hugo Vieira	Yokohama F. Marinos	5
3	(South Korea) Hwang Ui-jo	Gamba Osaka	5
