= Tetsuya Chinen =

Japanese footballer (born 1997)

Tetsuya Chinen 知念 哲矢
Personal information
- Full name: Tetsuya Chinen
- Date of birth: 8 November 1997 (age 29)
- Place of birth: Naha, Okinawa, Japan
- Height: 1.78 m (5 ft 10 in)
- Position: Centre back

Team information
- Current team: Tochigi City FC (on loan from Vegalta Sendai)
- Number: 17

Youth career
- Nakaima Maji FC
- Shikina FC
- 2010–2012: Ishida Junior High School
- 2013–2015: Nagasaki IAS High School

College career
Years	Team	Apps	(Gls)
2016–2019	Kindai University		

Senior career*
Years	Team	Apps	(Gls)
2020–2021	FC Ryukyu	38	(1)
2022–2023	Urawa Red Diamonds	9	(1)
2024–	Vegalta Sendai	7	(0)
2024	→ Omiya Ardija (loan)	5	(0)
2025	→ Mito HollyHock (loan)	8	(0)
2026–	→ Tochigi City FC (loan)	16	(2)
- * Club domestic league appearances and goals as of 16 August 2026

Tetsuya Chinen (知念 哲矢, Chinen Tetsuya; born 8 November 1997) is a Japanese professional footballer who plays as a centre back for Tochigi City FC, on loan from Vegalta Sendai.

== Career statistics ==
As of 27 April 2024

Appearances and goals by club, season and competition
Club	Season	League			Emperor's Cup		J.League Cup		Other		Total	
Club	Season	Division	Apps	Goals	Apps	Goals	Apps	Goals	Apps	Goals	Apps	Goals
FC Ryukyu	2020	J2 League	11	1	0	0	–		–		11	1
FC Ryukyu	2021	J2 League	27	0	0	0	–		–		27	0
FC Ryukyu	Total		38	1	0	0	0	0	0	0	38	1
Urawa Red Diamonds	2022	J1 League	9	1	0	0	1	0	2 (Note: Appearances in the AFC Champions League)	2	12	3
Urawa Red Diamonds	2023	J1 League	0	0	0	0	0	0	0	0	0	0
Urawa Red Diamonds	Total		9	1	0	0	1	0	2	2	12	3
Vegalta Sendai	2024	J2 League	5	0	0	0	1	0	0	0	6	0
Career total			52	2	0	0	2	0	2	2	56	4

== Honours ==
=== Club ===
Urawa Red Diamonds

- Japanese Super Cup: 2022
- AFC Champions League: 2022
