= Keisuke Saka =

Japanese footballer (born 1995)

Keisuke Saka 坂 圭祐

Personal information
- Full name: Keisuke Saka
- Date of birth: May 7, 1995 (age 31)
- Place of birth: Mie, Japan
- Height: 1.74 m (5 ft 8 1/2 in)
- Position: Centre back

Team information
- Current team: Tochigi SC
- Number: 13

Youth career
- 2011–2013: Yokkaichi Chuo Kogyo High School

College career
Years	Team	Apps	(Gls)
2014–2017	Juntendo University		

Senior career*
Years	Team	Apps	(Gls)
2018–2020	Shonan Bellmare	65	(3)
2021–2023	Oita Trinita	39	(0)
2024	Gamba Osaka	0	(0)
2024-	Tochigi SC	7	(0)
Medal record
Shonan Bellmare
Winner	J.League Cup	2018
- * Club domestic league appearances and goals as of 1 January 2026

Keisuke Saka (坂 圭祐, Saka Keisuke; born May 7, 1995) is a Japanese football player for Tochigi SC.

== Career ==
After graduating at Juntendo University and even entering the squad for the Universiade, Saka joined Shonan Bellmare and then debuted against Sagan Tosu in J. League Cup.

== Club statistics ==
Updated to 1 August 2022.

Appearances and goals by club, season and competition
Club	Season	League			Emperor's Cup		J. League Cup		Total	
Club	Season	Division	Apps	Goals	Apps	Goals	Apps	Goals	Apps	Goals
Shonan Bellmare	2018	J1 League	25	1	2	0	11	1	38	2
Shonan Bellmare	2019	J1 League	21	1	0	0	1	0	22	1
Shonan Bellmare	2020	J1 League	19	1	–		1	0	20	1
Oita Trinita	2021	J1 League	18	0	1	0	2	0	21	0
Oita Trinita	2022	J2 League	16	0	2	0	5	0	23	0
Career total			99	3	5	0	20	1	124	4
