= Hà Tĩnh (disambiguation) =

Hà Tĩnh is a province in north central coast region of Vietnam.

Hà Tĩnh may also refer to:

- Hà Tĩnh (city), former provincial city of Hà Tĩnh province
- Hà Tĩnh Stadium
- Formosa Ha Tinh Steel
