= Kasper Junker =

Danish footballer (born 1994)

Personal information
- Full name: Kasper Aalund Junker
- Date of birth: 5 March 1994 (age 32)
- Place of birth: Vinding, Denmark
- Height: 1.85 m (6 ft 1 in)
- Position: Forward

Team information
- Current team: Randers
- Number: 77

Youth career
- 1998–????: Vinding SF
- Vejle
- Kolding IF
- –2012: FC Djursland
- 2012–2013: Randers

Senior career*
Years	Team	Apps	(Gls)
2013–2016	Randers	17	(0)
2015	→ Fredericia (loan)	0	(0)
2016–2018	AGF	61	(7)
2018–2019	Horsens	25	(3)
2019	→ Stabæk (loan)	12	(6)
2020	Bodø/Glimt	25	(27)
2021–2023	Urawa Red Diamonds	42	(16)
2023	→ Nagoya Grampus (loan)	33	(16)
2024–2025	Nagoya Grampus	35	(5)
2026	Buriram United	0	(0)
2026–	Randers	8	(1)

International career
2013	Denmark U20	5	(0)
2016–2017	Denmark U21	4	(0)
- * Club domestic league appearances and goals as of 15 September 2026

Kasper Aalund Junker (born 5 March 1994) is a Danish professional footballer who plays as a forward for Danish Superliga club Randers.

== Career ==
=== Early years ===
Junker started playing football as a four-year-old with local club Vinding SF before moving to the Vejle Boldklub academy and from there on to Kolding IF. He joined Hessel Gods Fodboldkostskole (Hessel Gods Football Academy) in tenth grade, where he was coached by the likes of Flemming Povlsen and played for FC Djursland's team in the Denmark Series. Junker was spotted by scouts of Randers, whom he joined at U19 level in the summer of 2012, while attending HHX ("Higher Commercial Examination Programme") at Tradium Randers.

=== Randers ===
Junker made his Danish Superliga debut for Randers as a substitute in the away match against Vestsjælland on 7 March 2014, and contributed with an assist to Kasper Fisker's goal in the 1–1 draw. Junker also came on the pitch on 4 April when Randers beat AGF 1–0 in Aarhus.

In the summer of 2014, he signed a full-time contract with Randers, and was thus promoted to the first team and became a professional. In January 2015, he was sent on a six-month loan to second-tier Danish 1st Division club Fredericia, but failed to make an appearance.

=== AGF ===
In the summer of 2016, Junker signed a three-year contract with Randers' Superliga rivals to the south, AGF, where he began the season as a starter due to Morten "Duncan" Rasmussen's injury in a pre-season match.

=== Horsens ===
On the last day of the transfer window, 31 August 2018, Junker signed with AC Horsens on a five-year contract for an undisclosed fee. However, the Horsens stated that it was a record transfer fee for the club.

=== Norway ===
On 9 August 2019, Junker was loaned out to Norwegian club Stabæk from Horsens for the rest of 2019 with an option to buy. On 17 December 2019, he signed a three-year contract with Norwegian club Bodø/Glimt from 1 January 2020.

=== Japan ===
In April 2021 he was sold to Japanese club Urawa Red Diamonds. On 5 January 2023, Nagoya Grampus announced the signing of Junker on loan from Urawa Red Diamonds for the season. On 5 January 2023, fellow J1 League club Nagoya Grampus announced the signing of Junker on loan for the 2023 season. At the end of the campaign, he left Urawa following the expiration of his contract, and subsequently joined Nagoya Grampus on a free transfer for the 2024 season.

=== Buriram United ===
On 8 February 2026, Junker joined Thai League 1 club Buriram United.

== Career statistics ==
As of 15 September 2026

Appearances and goals by club, season and competition
Club	Season	League			National Cup		League Cup		Continental		Other		Total	
Club	Season	Division	Apps	Goals	Apps	Goals	Apps	Goals	Apps	Goals	Apps	Goals	Apps	Goals
Randers	2013–14	Danish Superliga	4	0	0	0	–		–		–		4	0
Randers	2014–15	Danish Superliga	5	0	0	0	–		–		–		5	0
Randers	2015–16	Danish Superliga	8	0	2	1	–		–		–		10	1
Randers	Total		17	0	2	1	0	0	0	0	0	0	19	1
AGF	2016–17	Danish Superliga	26	3	1	3	–		–		–		27	6
AGF	2017–18	Danish Superliga	28	4	0	0	–		–		–		28	4
AGF	2018–19	Danish Superliga	7	0	0	0	–		–		–		7	0
AGF	Total		61	7	1	3	0	0	0	0	0	0	62	10
Horsens	2018–19	Danish Superliga	22	3	1	0	–		–		–		23	3
Horsens	2019–20	Danish Superliga	3	0	0	0	–		–		–		3	0
Horsens	Total		25	3	1	0	0	0	0	0	0	0	26	3
Stabæk (loan)	2019	Eliteserien	12	6	0	0	–		–		–		12	6
Bodø/Glimt	2020	Eliteserien	25	27	–		–		1	1	–		26	28
Urawa Red Diamonds	2021	J1 League	21	9	5	3	6	4	–		–		32	16
Urawa Red Diamonds	2022	J1 League	21	7	0	0	3	0	6	4	0	0	30	11
Urawa Red Diamonds	Total		42	16	5	3	9	4	6	4	0	0	61	27
Nagoya Grampus (loan)	2023	J1 League	33	16	3	1	6	0	–		–		42	17
Nagoya Grampus	2024	J1 League	19	4	5	0	0	0	–		–		24	4
Nagoya Grampus	2025	J1 League	16	1	3	1	0	0	–		–		19	2
Nagoya Grampus	Total		35	5	8	1	0	0	0	0	0	0	43	6
Buriram United	2025–26	Thai League 1	0	0	0	0	0	0	3	0	–		3	0
Randers	2026–27	Danish Superliga	8	1	1	0	–		–		–		9	1
Career total			251	80	20	9	15	4	10	5	0	0	296	98

== Honours ==
=== Club ===
Bodø/Glimt

- Eliteserien: 2020

Urawa Red Diamonds

- Emperor's Cup: 2021
- AFC Champions League: 2022

Nagoya Grampus

- J.League Cup: 2024

=== Individual ===
- Eliteserien top scorer: 2020
- J.League MVP of the month: May 2021
