= Yūsuke Matsuo =

Japanese footballer

Yūsuke Matsuo 松尾 佑介
Personal information
- Date of birth: 23 July 1997 (age 29)
- Place of birth: Saitama, Japan
- Height: 1.70 m (5 ft 7 in)
- Position: Winger

Team information
- Current team: Machida Zelvia
- Number: 24

Youth career
- 2004–2009: Tozuka FC
- 2010–2016: Urawa Red Diamonds

College career
Years	Team	Apps	(Gls)
2016–2019	Sendai University		

Senior career*
Years	Team	Apps	(Gls)
2019–2021	Yokohama FC	71	(16)
2022–2026	Urawa Red Diamonds	89	(13)
2023	→ Westerlo (loan)	29	(0)
2026–	Machida Zelvia	0	(0)
- * Club domestic league appearances and goals as of 9 August 2026

Yūsuke Matsuo (松尾 佑介, Matsuo Yūsuke; born 23 July 1997) is a Japanese professional footballer who plays as a winger for J1 League club Machida Zelvia.

== Career ==
He rejoined Urawa Red Diamonds, with whom he spent part of his youth career with, in 2022.

In January 2023, Matsuo joined Belgian First Division A club Westerlo on loan until 31 December 2023.

== Career statistics ==
=== Club ===
As of 30 April 2022.

Club	Season	League			National Cup		League Cup		Continental		Other		Total	
Club	Season	Division	Apps	Goals	Apps	Goals	Apps	Goals	Apps	Goals	Apps	Goals	Apps	Goals
Sendai University	2019	–			2 (Note: Appearances in the Emperor's Cup)	0	–		–		0	0	2	0
Yokohama	2019	J2 League	21	6	0	0	0	0	–		0	0	21	6
Yokohama	2020	J1 League	20	7	0	0	1 (Note: Appearances in the J. League Cup)	0	–		0	0	21	7
Yokohama	2021	J1 League	30	3	0	0	3	0	–		0	0	33	3
Yokohama	Total		71	16	0	0	4	0	0	0	0	0	75	16
Urawa Red Diamonds	2022	J1 League	3	0	0	0	0	0	6 (Note: Appearances in the AFC Champions League)	5	0	0	9	5
Career total			74	16	2	0	4	0	6	5	0	0	86	21

== Honours ==
Urawa Red Diamonds

- AFC Champions League: 2022
