= Ataru Esaka =

Japanese footballer

Ataru Esaka 江坂 任
Personal information
- Full name: Ataru Esaka
- Date of birth: 31 May 1992 (age 34)
- Place of birth: Sanda, Hyōgo, Japan
- Height: 1.75 m (5 ft 9 in)
- Positions: Attacking midfielder; winger

Team information
- Current team: Fagiano Okayama
- Number: 8

Youth career
- 2008–2011: Kobe Koryo Gakuen High School

College career
Years	Team	Apps	(Gls)
2011–2014	Ryutsu Keizai University		

Senior career*
Years	Team	Apps	(Gls)
2015	Thespakusatsu Gunma	42	(13)
2016–2017	Omiya Ardija	65	(15)
2018–2021	Kashiwa Reysol	119	(31)
2021–2022	Urawa Red Diamonds	46	(7)
2023–2024	Ulsan Hyundai (Note: Ulsan Hyundai changed its name to Ulsan HD in 2024)	50	(8)
2025–	Fagiano Okayama	59	(9)

International career^{‡}
2021–	Japan	1	(0)
- * Club domestic league appearances and goals as of 12 August 2026 ‡ National team caps and goals as of 25 March 2021, 17:36 (UTC)

Ataru Esaka (江坂 任, Esaka Ataru; born May 31, 1992) is a Japanese football player who plays as an Attacking midfielder for J1 League Fagiano Okayama.

== Career ==
Esaka made his debut for Thespakusatsu Gunma against Yokohama FC on 8 March 2015. He scored his first goal for the club against Roasso Kumamoto on 15 March 2015, scoring in the 5th minute.

Esaka made his debut for Omiya against Gamba Osaka on 11 March 2016. He scored his first goal for the club against Sagan Tosu on 21 May 2016, scoring in the 74th minute.

Esaka made his debut for Kashiwa against Vegalta Sendai on 25 February 2018. He scored his first goals, a brace, against Gamba Osaka on 18 March 2018, scoring in the 8th and 18th minute.

Esaka made his debut for Urawa against Hokkaido Consadole Sapporo on 9 August 2021. He scored his first goal for the club on 14 August 2021 against Sagan Tosu, scoring a penalty in the 84th minute.

On 26 December 2022, Esaka was announced at Ulsan Hyundai.

On 23 December 2024, Esaka was announced at newly promoted club Fagiano Okayama from the 2025 season.

== International career ==
He made his debut for Japan national football team on 25 March 2021 in a friendly against South Korea.

== Career statistics ==
=== Club ===
As of the match played 15 February 2025.

Appearances and goals by club, season and competition
Club	Season	League			National Cup		League Cup		Continental		Other		Total	
Club	Season	Division	Apps	Goals	Apps	Goals	Apps	Goals	Apps	Goals	Apps	Goals	Apps	Goals
Thespakusatsu Gunma	2015	J2 League	42	13	0	0	–						42	13
Thespakusatsu Gunma	Total		42	13	0	0	–						42	13
Omiya Ardija	2016	J1 League	31	8	3	0	8	2	–				42	10
Omiya Ardija	2017	J1 League	34	7	2	1	2	1	–				38	9
Omiya Ardija	Total		65	15	5	1	10	3	–				80	19
Kashiwa Reysol	2018	J1 League	33	9	2	2	4	0	6	1	–		45	12
Kashiwa Reysol	2019	J2 League	38	11	1	0	4	1	–		–		43	12
Kashiwa Reysol	2020	J1 League	32	9	–		4	2	–		–		36	11
Kashiwa Reysol	2021	J1 League	16	2	0	0	3	0	–		–		19	2
Kashiwa Reysol	Total		119	31	3	2	15	3	6	1	–		143	37
Urawa Red Diamonds	2021	J1 League	16	5	4	1	4	1	–				24	7
Urawa Red Diamonds	2022	J1 League	30	2	2	0	3	1	7	1	1	2	43	6
Urawa Red Diamonds	Total		46	7	6	1	7	2	7	1	1	2	67	13
Ulsan Hyundai/ Ulsan HD	2023	K League 1	21	3	2	0	–		10	1	–		33	4
Ulsan Hyundai/ Ulsan HD	2024	K League 1	29	5	4	1	–		6	0	–		39	6
Ulsan Hyundai/ Ulsan HD	Total		50	8	6	1	–		16	1	–		72	10
Fagiano Okayama	2025	J1 League	1	0	0	0	0	0	–				1	0
Fagiano Okayama	Total		1	0	0	0	0	0	–				1	0
Career total			323	74	22	6	32	8	28	3	1	2	406	93

== Honours ==
Kashiwa Reysol

- J2 League: 2019

Urawa Red Diamonds

- Emperor's Cup: 2021
- Japanese Super Cup: 2022
- AFC Champions League: 2022

Ulsan Hyundai / Ulsan HD

- K League 1: 2023, 2024
