= Daiki Kaneko =

Japanese footballer (born 1998)

Daiki Kaneko 金子 大毅
Personal information
- Full name: Daiki Kaneko
- Date of birth: August 28, 1998 (age 28)
- Place of birth: Tokyo, Japan
- Height: 1.77 m (5 ft 10 in)
- Position: Defensive midfielder

Team information
- Current team: Júbilo Iwata
- Number: 6

Youth career
- Karasuyama Kita FC
- FC Tucano
- 2014–2016: Ichiritsu Funabashi High School

College career
Years	Team	Apps	(Gls)
2017	Kanagawa University		

Senior career*
Years	Team	Apps	(Gls)
2018–2020	Shonan Bellmare	56	(5)
2021–2023	Urawa Red Diamonds	12	(0)
2022	→ Kyoto Sanga FC (loan)	22	(0)
2023–2024	Kyoto Sanga FC	52	(0)
2025–	Júbilo Iwata	52	(4)
Medal record
Shonan Bellmare
Winner	J.League Cup	2018
- * Club domestic league appearances and goals as of 14 August 2026

Daiki Kaneko (金子 大毅, Kaneko Daiki; born August 28, 1998) is a Japanese professional footballer who plays as a defensive midfielder for Júbilo Iwata.

After starting his professional career with Shonan Bellmare, Kaneko has played over 140 league matches in the J1 League.

== Career ==
Born in Tokyo, Kaneko played at Kanagawa University in 2017, playing as a defensive midfielder in the Inter-High School Championship. He joined Shonan Bellmare from the 2018 season. Kaneko made his professional debut in the J League Cup against Sagan Tosu. Kaneko scored his first league goal against V-Varen Nagasaki on 31 August 2018, scoring in the 61st minute. On 9 September 2018, Kaneko scored the equalizing goal against Cerezo Osaka in the J.League Cup, scoring in the 32nd minute. On 14 March 2019, he underwent surgery for a dislocated right peroneal tendon and would be out for around three months.

On 25 December 2020, Kaneko was announced at Urawa Reds on a permanent transfer. He played 12 league matches during his time at the club.

On 26 December 2021, Kaneko was announced at Kyoto Sanga on a one year loan deal. During his loan spell, he made 22 league appearances and scored one goal. On 20 December 2022, Kaneko was announced at Kyoto Sanga on a permanent transfer. During the 2023 season, he played in 26 league matches.

On 26 December 2024, Kaneko was announced at Júbilo Iwata on a permanent transfer. He made over 20 league appearances during the season.

== Style of play ==
Kaneko is described as "fearless" and is talented at winning the ball.

== Club statistics ==
As of 24 July 2022.

Appearances and goals by club, season and competition
Club	Season	League			National cup		League cup		Other		Total	
Club	Season	Division	Apps	Goals	Apps	Goals	Apps	Goals	Apps	Goals	Apps	Goals
Japan			League		Emperor's Cup		J. League Cup		Other		Total	
Shonan Bellmare	2018	J1 League	10	1	2	0	9	2	-		21	3
Shonan Bellmare	2019	J1 League	18	2	1	0	0	0	2 (Note: Appearance in the J.League Cup / Copa Sudamericana Championship) (Note: Appearance in the J1/J2 play-offs)	0	21	2
Shonan Bellmare	2020	J1 League	28	2	0	0	0	0	-		28	2
Shonan Bellmare	Total		56	5	3	0	9	2	2	0	70	7
Urawa Red Diamonds	2021	J1 League	12	0	2	0	5	0	-		19	0
Kyoto Sanga (loan)	2022	J1 League	15	0	3	0	8	0	-		26	0
Total			83	5	8	0	22	2	2	0	115	7
