= 2022 AFC Champions League =

41st edition of premier club football tournament organized by the AFC

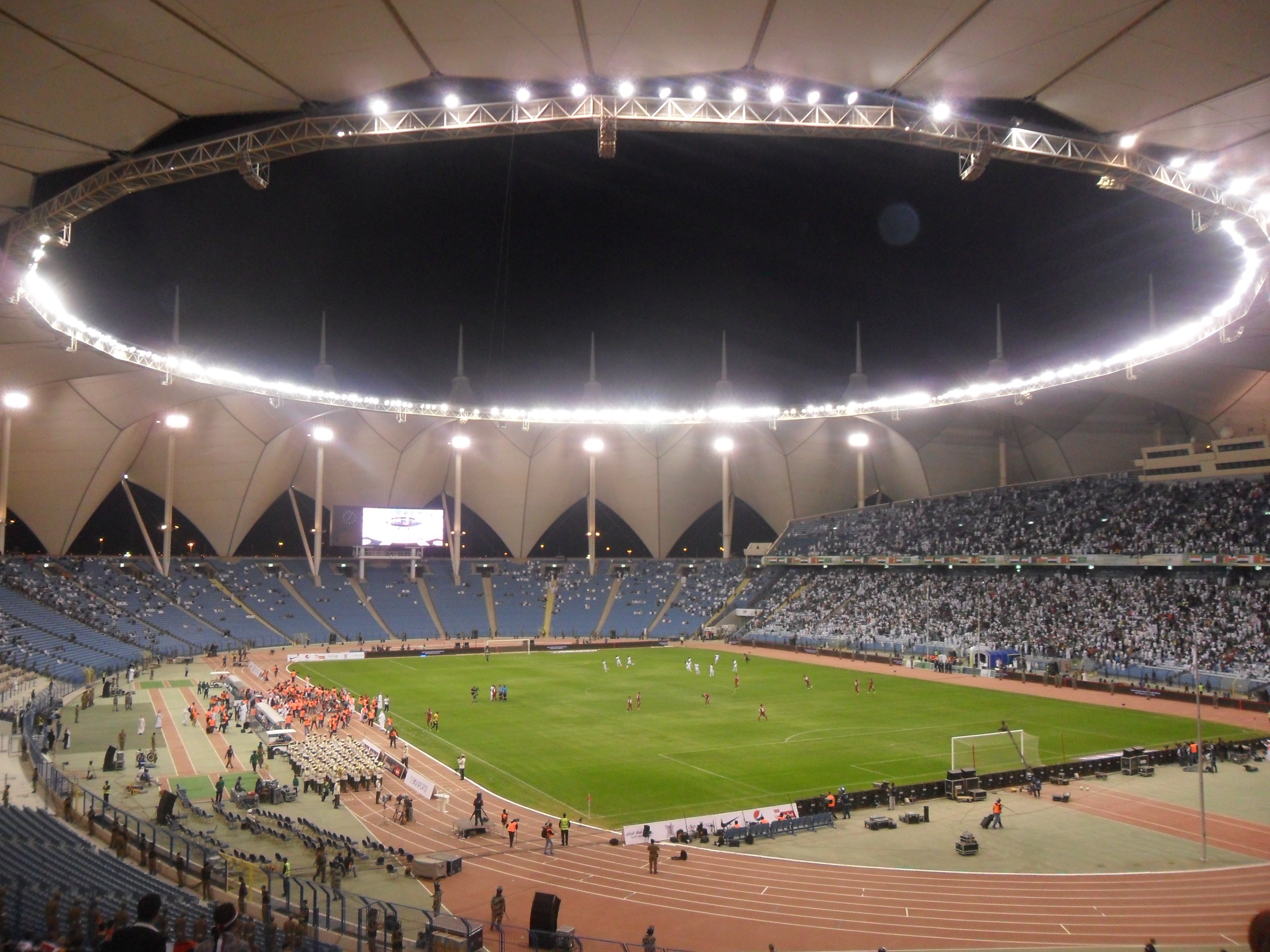
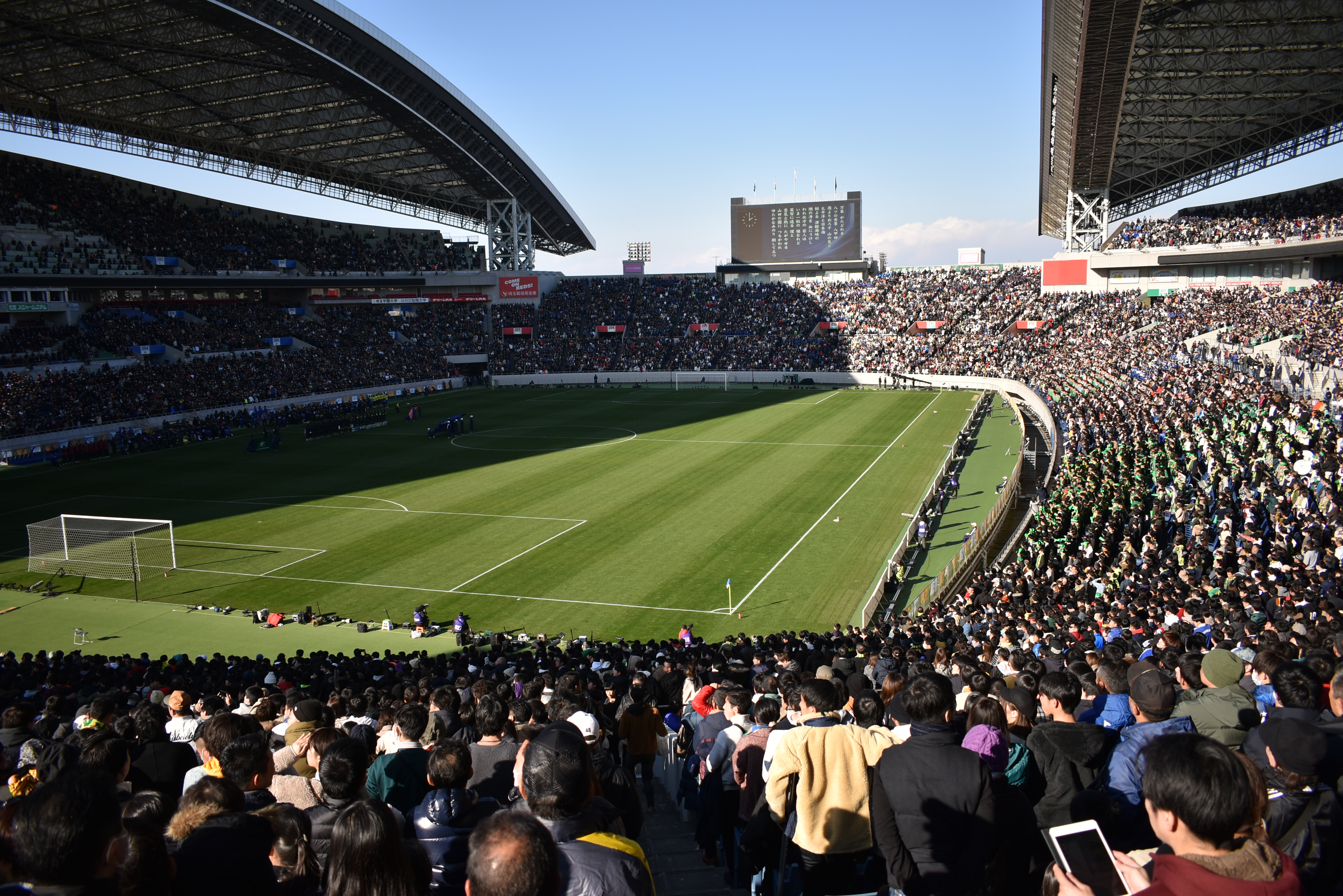
- King Fahd International Stadium in Riyadh (top) and Saitama Stadium 2002 in Saitama (bottom), venues for the final

Tournament details
- Dates: Qualifying: 8–15 March 2022; Competition proper: 7 April 2022 – 6 May 2023
- Teams: Group stage: 39; Total (maximum): 49

Final positions
- Champions: (Japan) Urawa Red Diamonds (3rd title)
- Runners-up: (Saudi Arabia) Al-Hilal

Tournament statistics
- Matches played: 130
- Goals scored: 384 (2.95 per match)
- Attendance: 511,749 (3,937 per match)
- Top scorer(s): Edmilson Junior (8 goals)
- Best player: Hiroki Sakai
- Fair play award: (Japan) Urawa Red Diamonds
- (Note: All statistics do not include qualifying results)

The 2022 AFC Champions League was the 41st edition of Asia's premier club football tournament organized by the Asian Football Confederation (AFC), and the 20th under the current AFC Champions League title.

This edition was the last in an all-year-round (spring-to-autumn) schedule despite actually being held from 2022 to 2023; from the next season onwards, the competition switched to an autumn-to-spring schedule.

This edition saw increase in numbers of preliminary players registration with 35 players, up from 30 in previous editions. This paved the way for more foreign players to be included in squad, although the AFC "3+1" foreign players rule was in effect during the match.

Due to the emerging complications caused by the Omicron variant of COVID-19 and the associated risks, as well as the unique circumstances surrounding the football schedule before and after the 2022 FIFA World Cup, it was confirmed that the final, originally scheduled for October 2022, would not be completed until May 2023. As the 2022 FIFA Club World Cup would already be held by that time, the AFC confirmed on 23 December 2022 that Al-Hilal would be their representative at the 2022 FIFA Club World Cup as the reigning champions from the 2021 AFC Champions League.

Al-Hilal of Saudi Arabia were the defending champions. Urawa Red Diamonds defeated Al-Hilal 2–1 on aggregate in the final to win their third title. As Asian champions, they automatically qualified for the 2023–24 AFC Champions League qualifying play-offs since they did not qualify through their domestic performance. In addition, they earned the right to play in both the 2023 FIFA Club World Cup in Saudi Arabia and the 2025 FIFA Club World Cup in the United States.

2021 AFC Cup winners Al-Muharraq, having not obtained an AFC license, were not eligible to participate in this edition.

== Association team allocation ==
The 47 AFC member associations were ranked based on their clubs' performance over the last four years in AFC competitions (their national team's FIFA World Rankings no longer considered). The slots were allocated by the following criteria according to the Entry Manual:

- The associations were split into two regions (Article 3.1):
  - West Region consisted of the 25 associations from the West Asian Football Federation (WAFF), the South Asian Football Federation (SAFF), and the Central Asian Football Association (CAFA).
  - East Region consisted of the 22 associations from the ASEAN Football Federation (AFF) and the East Asian Football Federation (EAFF).
  - The AFC could reallocate one or more associations to another region if necessary for sporting reasons.
- The top 12 associations in each region were eligible to enter the AFC Champions League.
- In each region, there were five groups in the group stage, including 16 direct slots, with the 4 remaining slots filled through qualifying play-offs (Article 3.2). The slots in each region were distributed as follows:
  - The associations ranked 1st and 2nd were each allocated three direct slots and one play-off slot.
  - The associations ranked 3rd and 4th were each allocated two direct slots and two play-off slots.
  - The associations ranked 5th were each allocated one direct slot and two play-off slots.
  - The associations ranked 6th were each allocated one direct slot and one play-off slot.
  - The associations ranked 7th to 10th were each allocated one direct slot.
  - The associations ranked 11th and 12th were each allocated one play-off slot.
- The AFC Champions League title holders and AFC Cup title holders were each allocated one play-off slot should they not qualify for the tournament through domestic performance (Article 3.6). The following rules were applied:
  - If the AFC Champions League title holders or AFC Cup title holders were from associations ranked 1st to 6th, their association was allocated the same number of play-off slots, and they replaced the lowest-seeded team from their association. Otherwise, their association was allocated one additional play-off slot, and they did not replace any team from their association (Articles 3.8, 3.9 and 3.10).
  - If both the AFC Champions League title holders and AFC Cup title holders were from the same association which is allocated only one play-off slot, their association is allocated one additional play-off slot, and only the lowest-seeded team from their association is replaced as a result (Article 3.11).
  - The AFC Champions League title holders and AFC Cup title holders were the lowest-seeded teams in the qualifying play-offs if they did not replace any team from their association (Article 3.12).
- If any association ranked 1st to 6th did not fulfill any one of the AFC Champions League criteria, they had all their direct slots converted into play-off slots. The direct slots given up were redistributed to the highest eligible association by the following criteria (Articles 3.13 and 3.14):
  - For each association, the maximum number of total slots was four and the maximum number of direct slots was three (Articles 3.4 and 3.5).
  - If any association ranked 3rd to 6th was allocated one additional direct slot, one play-off slot was annulled and not redistributed.
  - If any association ranked 5th to 6th was allocated two additional direct slots, one play-off slot were annulled and not redistributed.
- If any association ranked 7th to 10th did not fulfill any one of the AFC Champions League criteria, they had their direct slot converted into a play-off slot. The direct slot given up was redistributed to the next association ranked 11th or 12th, whose play-off slot was annulled and not redistributed, or if neither were eligible, the highest eligible association by the same criteria as mentioned above (Articles 3.16 and 3.17).
- If any association with only play-off slot(s), including any association ranked 11th to 12th or those mentioned above, did not fulfill the minimum AFC Champions League criteria, the play-off slot(s) were annulled and not redistributed (Articles 3.19 and 3.20).
- For each association, the maximum number of total slots was one-third of the total number of eligible teams (excluding foreign teams) in the top division (Article 3.4). If this rule wss applied, any direct slots given up were redistributed by the same criteria as mentioned above, and play-off slots were annulled and not redistributed (Article 9.10).
- All participating teams had to be granted an AFC Champions League license, and apart from cup winners, finish in the top half of their top division (Articles 7.1 and 9.5). If any association did not have enough teams which satisfied these criteria, any direct slots given up were redistributed by the same criteria as mentioned above, and play-off slots were annulled and not redistributed (Article 9.9).
- If any team granted a license refused to participate, their slot, either direct or play-off, was annulled and not redistributed (Article 9.11).

=== Association ranking ===
For the 2022 AFC Champions League, the associations were allocated slots according to their AFC Club Competitions Ranking which was published on 29 November 2019, which took into account their performance in the AFC Champions League and the AFC Cup during the period between 2016 and 2019.

Participation for 2022 AFC Champions League
	Participating
	Not participating
~~(N)~~	Number of teams/associations originally entered, before withdrawal of teams from the competition after the draw

West Region (5 groups)
Rank		Member Association	Points	Slots		
Rank		Member Association	Points	Group stage	Play-off	
Region	AFC	Member Association	Points	Group stage	Play-off round	Prelim. round
1	2	Qatar	97.644	4	0	0
2	4	Saudi Arabia	88.449	3	1	0
3	6	Iran	81.724	2	0	0
4	7	United Arab Emirates	61.870	2	2	0
5	9	Iraq	48.992	1	1	0
6	10	Uzbekistan	45.562	1	1	0
7	12	Jordan	33.852	1	0	0
8	15	India	29.576	1	0	0
9	17	Tajikistan	28.361	1	0	0
10	20	Turkmenistan	26.532	1	0	0
11	21	Lebanon	24.746	0	0	0
12	22	Syria	22.505	0	1	0
Total		Participating associations: 11		17	6	0
Total		Participating associations: 11		17	6	
Total		Participating associations: 11		23		

East Region (5 groups)
Rank		Member Association	Points	Slots		
Rank		Member Association	Points	Group stage	Play-off	
Region	AFC	Member Association	Points	Group stage	Play-off round	Prelim. round
1	1	China	100.000	2~~(3)~~	0~~(1)~~	0
2	3	Japan	93.321	3	1	0
3	5	South Korea	85.979	2	2	0
4	8	Thailand	51.189	2	2	0
5	11	Australia	40.896	1	1~~(0)~~	1~~(2)~~
6	13	Philippines	32.130	1	0	1
7	14	North Korea	30.100	0	0	0
8	16	Vietnam	28.571	1	0	0
9	18	Malaysia	26.960	1	0	0
10	19	Singapore	26.607	1	0	0
11	23	Hong Kong	19.945	1	0	0
12	27	Myanmar	12.756	0	0	0~~(1)~~
Total		Participating associations: 10		15~~(16)~~	6~~(8)~~	2~~(4)~~
Total		Participating associations: 10		15~~(16)~~	8	
Total		Participating associations: 10		23~~(24)~~		

Notes

1. Iran (IRN): On 7 January 2022, the AFC announced that Esteghlal and Gol Gohar F.C. had not satisfied the mandatory criteria of the AFC Club Licensing Regulations, and their licences were withdrawn by the AFC's independent Entry Control Body, and thus were declared ineligible to participate in the 2022 AFC Champions League.
2. Iraq (IRQ): Al-Najaf, the 2020–21 Iraqi Premier League third-place team, failed to obtain an AFC license, and Al-Shorta, the league's fourth-placed team, declined to participate in Al-Najaf's place. Therefore, Iraq's second play-off round slot was annulled.
3. Lebanon (LBN): Lebanon did not implement the club licensing system.
4. China (CHN): Changchun Yatai, withdrew from the competition after the draw, with Shanghai Port withdrawing on 11 April, as a result of lockdown measures enforced in Shanghai as a result of the ongoing COVID-19 pandemic.
5. North Korea (PRK): North Korea did not implement the club licensing system.
6. Myanmar (MYA): The team from Myanmar which originally entered the AFC Champions League, Shan United, withdrew from the competition after the draw.

== Teams ==
In the following table, the number of appearances and last appearance count only those since the 2002–03 season (including qualifying rounds), when the competition was rebranded as the AFC Champions League.

Entry round	West Region			East Region		
Group stage	Team	Qualifying method	App. (last)	Team	Qualifying method	App. (last)
Group stage	(Qatar) Al-Sadd	2020–21 Qatar Stars League champions and 2021 Emir of Qatar Cup winners	17th (2021)	(China) Shandong Taishan	2021 Chinese Super League champions and 2021 Chinese FA Cup winners	10th (2019)
Group stage	(Qatar) Al-Duhail	2020–21 Qatar Stars League runners-up	11th (2021)	(China) Shanghai Port	2021 Chinese Super League runners-up	7th (2021)
Group stage	(Qatar) Al-Rayyan	2020–21 Qatar Stars League third place	12th (2021)	(China) Guangzhou	2021 Chinese Super League third place	11th (2021)
Group stage	(Qatar) Al-Gharafa	2020–21 Qatar Stars League fourth place	12th (2021)	(Japan) Kawasaki Frontale	2021 J1 League champions	9th (2021)
Group stage	(Saudi Arabia) Al-Hilal	2020–21 Saudi Professional League champions	18th (2021)	(Japan) Urawa Red Diamonds	2021 Emperor's Cup winners	8th (2019)
Group stage	(Saudi Arabia) Al-Faisaly	2020–21 King Cup winners	1st	(Japan) Yokohama F. Marinos	2021 J1 League runners-up	5th (2020)
Group stage	(Saudi Arabia) Al-Shabab	2020–21 Saudi Professional League runners-up	10th (2015)	(South Korea) Jeonbuk Hyundai Motors	2021 K League 1 champions	15th (2021)
Group stage	(Iran) Foolad	2020–21 Hazfi Cup winners	5th (2021)	(South Korea) Jeonnam Dragons	2021 Korean FA Cup winners	3rd (2008)
Group stage	(Iran) Sepahan	2020–21 Persian Gulf Pro League runners-up	13th (2020)	(Thailand) BG Pathum United	2020–21 Thai League 1 champions	3rd (2021)
Group stage	(United Arab Emirates) Al-Jazira	2020–21 UAE Pro League champions	11th (2018)	(Thailand) Chiangrai United	2020–21 Thai FA Cup winners	5th (2021)
Group stage	(United Arab Emirates) Shabab Al-Ahli	2020–21 UAE President's Cup winners 2020–21 UAE Pro League third place	10th (2021)	(Australia) Melbourne City	2020–21 A-League regular season premiers	1st
Group stage	(Iraq) Al-Quwa Al-Jawiya	2020–21 Iraqi Premier League champions and 2020–21 Iraq FA Cup winners	6th (2021)	(Philippines) United City	2020 Philippines Football League champions	5th (2021)
Group stage	(Uzbekistan) Pakhtakor Tashkent	2021 Uzbekistan Super League champions	18th (2021)	(Vietnam) Hoang Anh Gia Lai	2021 V.League 1 first-placed team	3rd (2005)
Group stage	(Jordan) Al-Wehdat	2021 Jordanian Pro League runners-up	7th (2021)	(Malaysia) Johor Darul Ta'zim	2021 Malaysia Super League champions	8th (2021)
Group stage	(India) Mumbai City	2020–21 Indian Super League league shield winners	1st	(Singapore) Lion City Sailors	2021 Singapore Premier League champions	3rd (2019)
Group stage	(Tajikistan) Istiklol	2021 Tajikistan Higher League champions	4th (2021)	(Hong Kong) Kitchee	2020–21 Hong Kong Premier League champions	7th (2021)
Group stage	(Turkmenistan) Ahal	2021 Ýokary Liga runners-up	1st			
Play-off round	(Saudi Arabia) Al-Taawoun	2020–21 Saudi Professional League fourth place	3rd (2020)	(China) Changchun Yatai	2021 Chinese Super League fourth place	3rd (2010)
Play-off round	(United Arab Emirates) Baniyas	2020–21 UAE Pro League runners-up	3rd (2014)	(Japan) Vissel Kobe	2021 J1 League third place	2nd (2020)
Play-off round	(United Arab Emirates) Sharjah	2020–21 UAE Pro League fourth place	5th (2021)	(South Korea) Ulsan Hyundai	2021 K League 1 runners-up	10th (2021)
Play-off round	(Iraq) Al-Zawraa	2020–21 Iraqi Premier League runners-up	7th (2021)	(South Korea) Daegu FC	2021 K League 1 third place	3rd (2021)
Play-off round	(Uzbekistan) Nasaf Qarshi	2021 Uzbekistan Cup winners	7th (2018)	(Thailand) Buriram United	2020–21 Thai League 1 runners-up	10th (2020)
Play-off round	(Syria) Al-Jaish	2020–21 Syrian Premier League runners-up	3rd (2005)	(Thailand) Port	2020–21 Thai League 1 third place	3rd (2021)
Preliminary round				(Australia) Sydney FC	2020–21 A-League regular season runners-up	7th (2020)
Preliminary round				(Australia) Melbourne Victory	2021 FFA Cup winners	9th (2020)
Preliminary round				(Philippines) Kaya–Iloilo	2021 Copa Paulino Alcantara winners	2nd (2021)
Preliminary round				(Myanmar) Shan United	2020 Myanmar National League champions	3rd (2020)

Notes

1. Title holders (TH): Al-Hilal are the title holders.
2. Jordan (JOR): The 2021 Jordanian Pro League champions Al-Ramtha were not granted an AFC Champions League license.
3. Saudi Arabia (KSA): Al-Ittihad, the 2020–21 Saudi Professional League third place, failed to obtain an AFC license. As a result, Al-Taawoun, the league's fourth-placed team, entered the qualifying play-offs.
4. Myanmar (MYA): Due to the COVID-19 pandemic in Myanmar plus the 2021 Myanmar coup d'état and protests, the 2021 Myanmar National League was not held by the Myanmar Football Federation.
5. Philippines (PHI): Due to the COVID-19 pandemic in the Philippines, the 2021 Philippines Football League was cancelled. The Philippine Football Federation has nominated United City, the 2020 Philippines Football League champions, to participate.
6. Syria (SYR): The 2020–21 Syrian Premier League champions Tishreen were not granted an AFC Champions League license, and will play in the 2022 AFC Cup instead.
7. Turkmenistan (TKM): Only Ahal were granted an AFC Champions League license, so the Ýokary Liga champions Altyn Asyr were only eligible for the 2022 AFC Cup.
8. Vietnam (VIE): Due to the COVID-19 pandemic in Vietnam, the 2021 V.League 1 and 2021 Vietnamese Cup were both abandoned by the Vietnam Football Federation. It was decided that the league's first-place team Hoang Anh Gia Lai at the time of abandonment would take the AFC Champions League slot, with the AFC Cup slots to go to the second-and third-placed teams.
9. Withdrawn Teams 1 (WDN1): Shan United withdrew from the competition on 19 January 2022.
10. Withdrawn Teams 2 (WDN2): Changchun Yatai withdrew from the competition on 1 March 2022.
11. Withdrawn Teams 3 (WDN3): Shanghai Port withdrew from the competition on 11 April 2022, as a result of the lockdown measures enforced in Shanghai.
Location of teams of the 2022 AFC Champions League.
Brown: Group A; Red: Group B; Orange: Group C; Yellow: Group D; Pink: Group E;
Green: Group F; Blue: Group G; Cyan: Group H; Turquoise: Group I; Purple: Group J;
Qualifying play-offs

== Schedule ==
The schedule of the competition was as follows. The final version was originally announced on 13 January 2022, with the following modifications made on 9 December 2022: the West Region knockout stage matches were pushed back by two weeks in February, while the final was moved from 19 and 26 February to 29 April and 6 May 2023.

Stage	Round	Draw date	West Region	East Region
Preliminary stage	Preliminary round	No draw	—N/a	8 March 2022
Play-off stage	Play-off round	No draw	15 March 2022	
Group stage	Matchday 1	17 January 2022	7–8 April 2022	15–16 April 2022
Group stage	Matchday 2	17 January 2022	10–11 April 2022	18–19 April 2022
Group stage	Matchday 3	17 January 2022	14–15 April 2022	21–22 April 2022
Group stage	Matchday 4	17 January 2022	18–19 April 2022	24–25 April 2022
Group stage	Matchday 5	17 January 2022	22–23 April 2022	27–28 April 2022
Group stage	Matchday 6	17 January 2022	26–27 April 2022	30 April – 1 May 2022
Knockout stage	Round of 16	17 January 2022	19–20 February 2023	18–19 August 2022
Knockout stage	Quarter-finals	E: 20 August 2022; W: 21 February 2023	23 February 2023	22 August 2022
Knockout stage	Semi-finals	E: 20 August 2022; W: 21 February 2023	26 February 2023	25 August 2022
Knockout stage	Final	E: 20 August 2022; W: 21 February 2023	29 April and 6 May 2023	

=== Original schedule ===
The original schedule of the competition, as planned in 2019 before the pandemic, included a two-legged knockout stage.

Original schedule
Stage	Round	First leg	Second leg
Preliminary stage	Preliminary round 1	11 January 2022	
Preliminary stage	Preliminary round 2	18 January 2022	
Play-off stage	Play-off round	25 January 2022	
Group stage	Matchday 1	7–9 February 2022	
Group stage	Matchday 2	14–16 February 2022	
Group stage	Matchday 3	28 February – 2 March 2022	
Group stage	Matchday 4	14–16 March 2022	
Group stage	Matchday 5	4–6 April 2022	
Group stage	Matchday 6	18–20 April 2022	
Knockout stage	Round of 16	9–11 May 2022	23–25 May 2022
Knockout stage	Quarter-finals	15–17 August 2022	29–31 August 2022
Knockout stage	Semi-finals	13–14 September 2022	4–5 October 2022
Knockout stage	Final	22 October 2022	29 October 2022

In June 2021, a minor revision was made to the schedule of the preliminary and play-off stages: matches were moved one week earlier in January.

Minor revision to schedule
Stage	Round	First leg	Second leg
Preliminary stage	Preliminary round 1	4 January 2022	
Preliminary stage	Preliminary round 2	11 January 2022	
Play-off stage	Play-off round	18 January 2022	

=== First major revision to schedule ===
On 5 July 2021, the AFC announced the first revised schedule of the competition, featuring a centralized group stage and single-leg knockout stage matches.

First major revision to schedule
Stage	Round	West Region	East Region
Preliminary stage	Preliminary round 1	15 March 2022	1 March 2022
Preliminary stage	Preliminary round 2	5 April 2022	8 March 2022
Play-off stage	Play-off round	20 April 2022	15 March 2022
Group stage	Matchday 1	10–11 May 2022	15–16 April 2022
Group stage	Matchday 2	13–14 May 2022	18–19 April 2022
Group stage	Matchday 3	16–17 May 2022	21–22 April 2022
Group stage	Matchday 4	19–20 May 2022	24–25 April 2022
Group stage	Matchday 5	22–23 May 2022	27–28 April 2022
Group stage	Matchday 6	25–26 May 2022	30 April – 1 May 2022
Knockout stage	Round of 16	29–31 August 2022	
Knockout stage	Quarter-finals	12–14 September 2022	
Knockout stage	Semi-finals	11–12 October 2022	
Knockout stage	Final	29 October 2022	

=== Second major revision to schedule ===
On 13 January 2022, the AFC announced the second revised schedule of the competition, with the knockout stage of the West Region pushed back to February 2023, and a two-legged format restored for the final.

Second major revision to schedule
Stage	Round	West Region	East Region
Preliminary stage	Preliminary round	—N/a	8 March 2022
Play-off stage	Play-off round	15 March 2022	
Group stage	Matchday 1	7–8 April 2022	15–16 April 2022
Group stage	Matchday 2	10–11 April 2022	18–19 April 2022
Group stage	Matchday 3	14–15 April 2022	21–22 April 2022
Group stage	Matchday 4	18–19 April 2022	24–25 April 2022
Group stage	Matchday 5	22–23 April 2022	27–28 April 2022
Group stage	Matchday 6	26–27 April 2022	30 April – 1 May 2022
Knockout stage	Round of 16	3–4 February 2023	18–19 August 2022
Knockout stage	Quarter-finals	7 February 2023	22 August 2022
Knockout stage	Semi-finals	10 February 2023	25 August 2022
Knockout stage	Final	19 and 26 February 2023	

== Qualifying play-offs ==
In the qualifying play-offs, each tie was played as a single match. Extra time and penalty shoot-out were used to decide the winner if necessary. The bracket of the qualifying play-offs for each region was determined based on each team's association ranking and their seeding within their association, with the team from the higher-ranked association hosting the match. Teams from the same association could not be placed into the same tie. The seven winners of the play-off round (three from West Region and four from East Region) advanced to the group stage to join the 33 direct entrants.

=== Preliminary round ===
A total of two teams played in the preliminary round.

East Region
Team 1	Score	Team 2
Sydney FC (Australia)	5–0	(Philippines) Kaya–Iloilo
Melbourne Victory (Australia)	Cancelled (Note: Shan United withdrew from the AFC Champions League and Melbourne Victory entered the play-off round instead of the preliminary round.)	(Myanmar) Shan United

=== Play-off round ===
West Region
Team 1	Score	Team 2
Al-Taawoun (Saudi Arabia)	1–1 (a.e.t.) (5–4 p)	(Syria) Al-Jaish
Baniyas (United Arab Emirates)	0–2	(Uzbekistan) Nasaf Qarshi
Sharjah (United Arab Emirates)	1–1 (a.e.t.) (6–5 p)	(Iraq) Al-Zawraa

East Region
Team 1	Score	Team 2
Changchun Yatai (China)	Cancelled (Note: Changchun Yatai withdrew from the competition after the draw. AFC decided to cancel the play-off match, and the winner of preliminary stage, Sydney FC, automatically advanced to the group stage.)	(Australia) Sydney FC
Vissel Kobe (Japan)	4–3 (a.e.t.)	(Australia) Melbourne Victory
Ulsan Hyundai (South Korea)	3–0	(Thailand) Port
Daegu FC (South Korea)	1–1 (a.e.t.) (3–2 p)	(Thailand) Buriram United

== Group stage ==
The draw for the group stage was held on 17 January 2022 at the AFC House in Kuala Lumpur, Malaysia. The 40 teams were drawn into ten groups of four: five groups each in the West Region (Groups A–E) and the East Region (Groups F–J). For each region, teams were seeded into four pots and drawn into the relevant positions within each group, based on their association ranking and their seeding within their association, in consideration of the technical balance between groups. Teams from the same association could not be drawn into the same group. In the group stage, each group was played in a double round-robin format in centralised venues. The winners of each group and three best runners-up from each region advanced to the round of 16 of the knockout stage.

Tiebreakers

The teams were ranked according to points (3 points for a win, 1 point for a draw, 0 points for a loss). If tied on points, tiebreakers were applied in the following order (Regulations Article 8.3):

1. Points in head-to-head matches among tied teams;
2. Goal difference in head-to-head matches among tied teams;
3. Goals scored in head-to-head matches among tied teams;
4. ~~Away goals scored in head-to-head matches among tied teams;~~ (not applicable since the matches were played in a centralised venue)
5. If more than two teams were tied, and after applying all head-to-head criteria above, a subset of teams were still tied, all head-to-head criteria above were reapplied exclusively to this subset of teams;
6. Goal difference in all group matches;
7. Goals scored in all group matches;
8. Penalty shoot-out if only two teams playing each other in the last round of the group are tied;
9. Disciplinary points (yellow card = 1 point, red card as a result of two yellow cards = 3 points, direct red card = 3 points, yellow card followed by direct red card = 4 points);
10. Association ranking.

=== Group A ===
Pos	Team	Pld	W	D	L	GF	GA	GD	Pts	Qualification	HIL	RYN	SHJ	IST
1	(Saudi Arabia) Al-Hilal (H)	6	4	1	1	11	5	+6	13 (Note: Equal on head-to-head points. Head-to-head goal difference: Al-Hilal +1, Al-Rayyan –1.)	Advance to Round of 16	—	0–2	2–1	1–0
2	(Qatar) Al-Rayyan	6	4	1	1	10	7	+3	13	Advance to Round of 16	0–3	—	3–1	1–0
3	(United Arab Emirates) Sharjah	6	1	2	3	7	11	−4	5		2–2	1–1	—	2–1
4	(Tajikistan) Istiklol	6	1	0	5	5	10	−5	3		0–3	2–3	2–0	—

Source: AFC
(H) Hosts

=== Group B ===
Pos	Team	Pld	W	D	L	GF	GA	GD	Pts	Qualification	SHB	MUM	QWJ	AJZ
1	(Saudi Arabia) Al-Shabab (H)	6	5	1	0	18	1	+17	16	Advance to Round of 16	—	6–0	3–0	3–0
2	(India) Mumbai City	6	2	1	3	3	11	−8	7 (Note: Head-to-head points: Mumbai City 6, Al-Quwa Al-Jawiya 0.)		0–3	—	1–0	0–0
3	(Iraq) Al-Quwa Al-Jawiya	6	2	1	3	7	10	−3	7		1–1	1–2	—	3–2
4	(United Arab Emirates) Al-Jazira	6	1	1	4	4	10	−6	4		0–2	1–0	1–2	—

Source: AFC
(H) Hosts

=== Group C ===
Pos	Team	Pld	W	D	L	GF	GA	GD	Pts	Qualification	FOO	SAH	GHA	AHA
1	(Iran) Foolad	6	3	3	0	5	2	+3	12	Advance to Round of 16	—	1–1	0–0	1–0
2	(United Arab Emirates) Shabab Al-Ahli	6	2	4	0	14	7	+7	10	Advance to Round of 16	1–1	—	8–2	2–1
3	(Qatar) Al-Gharafa	6	1	2	3	7	14	−7	5		0–1	1–1	—	2–0
4	(Turkmenistan) Ahal	6	1	1	4	6	9	−3	4		0–1	1–1	4–2	—

Source: AFC

=== Group D ===
Pos	Team	Pld	W	D	L	GF	GA	GD	Pts	Qualification	DUH	TWN	SEP	PAK
1	(Qatar) Al-Duhail	6	5	0	1	17	9	+8	15	Advance to Round of 16	—	1–2	5–2	3–2
2	(Saudi Arabia) Al-Taawoun (H)	6	2	1	3	13	12	+1	7 (Note: Head-to-head points: Al-Taawoun 4, Sepahan 1.)		3–4	—	3–0	0–1
3	(Iran) Sepahan	6	2	1	3	8	12	−4	7		0–1	1–1	—	2–1
4	(Uzbekistan) Pakhtakor	6	2	0	4	10	15	−5	6		0–3	5–4	1–3	—

Source: AFC
Rules for classification: Tiebreakers
(H) Hosts

=== Group E ===
Pos	Team	Pld	W	D	L	GF	GA	GD	Pts	Qualification	FAI	NAS	SAD	WEH
1	(Saudi Arabia) Al-Faisaly (H)	6	2	3	1	5	4	+1	9 (Note: Head-to-head points: Al-Faisaly 4, Nasaf Qarshi 1.)	Advance to Round of 16	—	0–0	2–1	1–1
2	(Uzbekistan) Nasaf Qarshi	6	2	3	1	8	5	+3	9	Advance to Round of 16	0–1	—	3–1	2–0
3	(Qatar) Al-Sadd	6	2	1	3	10	11	−1	7		1–0	1–1	—	5–2
4	(Jordan) Al-Wehdat	6	1	3	2	9	12	−3	6		1–1	2–2	3–1	—

Source: AFC
(H) Hosts

=== Group F ===
Pos	Team	Pld	W	D	L	GF	GA	GD	Pts	Qualification	DAE	URA	LCS	SDT
1	(South Korea) Daegu FC	6	4	1	1	14	4	+10	13 (Note: Head-to-head points: Daegu FC 4, Urawa Red Diamonds 1.)	Advance to Round of 16	—	1–0	0–3	4–0
2	(Japan) Urawa Red Diamonds	6	4	1	1	20	2	+18	13	Advance to Round of 16	0–0	—	6–0	5–0
3	(Singapore) Lion City Sailors	6	2	1	3	8	14	−6	7		1–2	1–4	—	3–2
4	(China) Shandong Taishan	6	0	1	5	2	24	−22	1		0–7	0–5	0–0	—

Source: AFC

=== Group G ===
Pos	Team	Pld	W	D	L	GF	GA	GD	Pts	Qualification	BGP	MCY	JND	UCT
1	(Thailand) BG Pathum United (H)	6	3	3	0	11	2	+9	12	Advance to Round of 16	—	1–1	0–0	5–0
2	(Australia) Melbourne City	6	3	3	0	10	3	+7	12		0–0	—	2–1	3–0
3	(South Korea) Jeonnam Dragons	6	2	2	2	5	5	0	8		0–2	1–1	—	2–0
4	(Philippines) United City	6	0	0	6	1	17	−16	0		1–3	0–3	0–1	—

Source: AFC
(H) Hosts

=== Group H ===
Pos	Team	Pld	W	D	L	GF	GA	GD	Pts	Qualification	YFM	JBH	HOA	SYD
1	(Japan) Yokohama F. Marinos	6	4	1	1	9	3	+6	13	Advance to Round of 16	—	0–1	2–0	3–0
2	(South Korea) Jeonbuk Hyundai Motors	6	3	3	0	7	4	+3	12	Advance to Round of 16	1–1	—	1–0	0–0
3	(Vietnam) Hoang Anh Gia Lai (H)	6	1	2	3	4	7	−3	5		1–2	1–1	—	1–0
4	(Australia) Sydney FC	6	0	2	4	3	9	−6	2		0–1	2–3	1–1	—

Source: AFC
(H) Hosts

=== Group I ===
Pos	Team	Pld	W	D	L	GF	GA	GD	Pts	Qualification	JDT	KSF	ULS	GZH
1	(Malaysia) Johor Darul Ta'zim (H)	6	4	1	1	11	7	+4	13	Advance to Round of 16	—	0–5	2–1	5–0
2	(Japan) Kawasaki Frontale	6	3	2	1	17	4	+13	11		0–0	—	1–1	1–0
3	(South Korea) Ulsan Hyundai	6	3	1	2	14	7	+7	10		1–2	3–2	—	3–0
4	(China) Guangzhou	6	0	0	6	0	24	−24	0		0–2	0–8	0–5	—

Source: AFC
(H) Hosts

=== Group J ===
Pos	Team	Pld	W	D	L	GF	GA	GD	Pts	Qualification	VKO	KIT	CRU	SHP
1	(Japan) Vissel Kobe	4	2	2	0	10	3	+7	8	Advance to Round of 16	—	2–1	6–0	Canc.
2	(Hong Kong) Kitchee	4	2	1	1	7	6	+1	7	Advance to Round of 16	2–2	—	1–0	Canc.
3	(Thailand) Chiangrai United (H)	4	0	1	3	2	10	−8	1		0–0	2–3	—	Canc.
4	(China) Shanghai Port	0	0	0	0	0	0	0	0	Withdrew	Canc.	Canc.	Canc.	—

Source: AFC
(H) Hosts

=== Ranking of second-placed teams ===
==== West Region ====
Pos	Grp	Team	Pld	W	D	L	GF	GA	GD	Pts	Qualification
1	A	(Qatar) Al-Rayyan	6	4	1	1	10	7	+3	13	Advance to Round of 16
2	C	(United Arab Emirates) Shabab Al-Ahli	6	2	4	0	14	7	+7	10	Advance to Round of 16
3	E	(Uzbekistan) Nasaf Qarshi	6	2	3	1	8	5	+3	9	Advance to Round of 16
4	D	(Saudi Arabia) Al-Taawoun	6	2	1	3	13	12	+1	7	
5	B	(India) Mumbai City	6	2	1	3	3	11	−8	7	

Source: AFC
Rules for classification: 1) Points; 2) Goal difference; 3) Goals scored; 4) Disciplinary points; 5) Drawing of lots.

==== East Region ====
As Group J only had three teams remaining, the results against fourth-placed teams in Groups F–I were omitted in this ranking.

Pos	Grp	Team	Pld	W	D	L	GF	GA	GD	Pts	Qualification
1	H	(South Korea) Jeonbuk Hyundai Motors	4	2	2	0	3	1	+2	8	Advance to Round of 16
2	F	(Japan) Urawa Red Diamonds	4	2	1	1	10	2	+8	7	Advance to Round of 16
3	J	(Hong Kong) Kitchee	4	2	1	1	7	6	+1	7	Advance to Round of 16
4	G	(Australia) Melbourne City	4	1	3	0	4	3	+1	6	
5	I	(Japan) Kawasaki Frontale	4	1	2	1	8	4	+4	5	

Source: AFC
Rules for classification: 1) Points; 2) Goal difference; 3) Goals scored; 4) Disciplinary points; 5) Drawing of lots.

== Knockout stage ==
In the knockout stage, the 16 teams played a single-elimination tournament, with the teams split into the two regions until the final. All ties were played as a single-leg match (Regulations Article 9.1), except for the final, which was played over two legs. Extra time and penalty shoot-out were used to decide the winners if necessary (Regulations Article 9.3 and 10.1).

=== Bracket ===
Round of 16
19 February 2023 – Doha
(Qatar Football Association) Al-Duhail (p)	1 (7)
(Qatar Football Association) Al-Rayyan	1 (6)
19 February 2023 – Al Wakrah
(Saudi Arabian Football Federation) Al-Shabab	2
(Uzbekistan Football Association) Nasaf Qarshi	0
20 February 2023 – Doha
(Saudi Arabian Football Federation) Al-Faisaly	0
(Football Federation Islamic Republic of Iran) Foolad	1
20 February 2023 – Al Wakrah
(Saudi Arabian Football Federation) Al-Hilal	3
(United Arab Emirates Football Association) Shabab Al-Ahli	1
18 August 2022 – Saitama (2002)
(Japan Football Association) Vissel Kobe	3
(Japan Football Association) Yokohama F. Marinos	2
18 August 2022 – Saitama (Urawa)
(Korea Football Association) Daegu FC	1
(Korea Football Association) Jeonbuk Hyundai Motors (a.e.t.)	2
19 August 2022 – Saitama (2002)
(Football Association of Malaysia) Johor Darul Ta'zim	0
(Japan Football Association) Urawa Red Diamonds	5
19 August 2022 – Saitama (Urawa)
(Football Association of Thailand) BG Pathum United	4
(Football Association of Hong Kong, China) Kitchee SC	0

Quarter-finals
23 February 2023 – Doha
(Qatar Football Association) Al-Duhail	2
(Saudi Arabian Football Federation) Al-Shabab	1
West Region
23 February 2023 – Al Wakrah
(Football Federation Islamic Republic of Iran) Foolad	0
(Saudi Arabian Football Federation) Al-Hilal	1
22 August 2022 – Saitama (2002)
(Japan Football Association) Vissel Kobe	1
(Korea Football Association) Jeonbuk Hyundai Motors (a.e.t.)	3
East Region
22 August 2022 – Saitama (2002)
(Japan Football Association) Urawa Red Diamonds	4
(Football Association of Thailand) BG Pathum United	0

Semi-finals
26 February 2023 – Doha
(Qatar Football Association) Al-Duhail	0
(Saudi Arabian Football Federation) Al-Hilal	7
25 August 2022 – Saitama (2002)
(Korea Football Association) Jeonbuk Hyundai Motors	2 (1)
(Japan Football Association) Urawa Red Diamonds (p)	2 (3)

Final
(Saudi Arabian Football Federation) Al-Hilal	1	0	1
(Japan Football Association) Urawa Red Diamonds	1	1	2

=== Round of 16 ===
The round of 16 was played over one leg, with the matchups determined by the combination tables based on which group runners-up qualified.

West Region
Team 1	Score	Team 2
Al-Hilal (Saudi Arabia)	3–1	(United Arab Emirates) Shabab Al-Ahli
Al-Shabab (Saudi Arabia)	2–0	(Uzbekistan) Nasaf Qarshi
Al-Duhail (Qatar)	1–1 (a.e.t.) (7–6 p)	(Qatar) Al-Rayyan
Al-Faisaly (Saudi Arabia)	0–1	(Iran) Foolad

East Region
Team 1	Score	Team 2
Daegu FC (South Korea)	1–2 (a.e.t.)	(South Korea) Jeonbuk Hyundai Motors
BG Pathum United (Thailand)	4–0	(Hong Kong) Kitchee
Johor Darul Ta'zim (Malaysia)	0–5	(Japan) Urawa Red Diamonds
Vissel Kobe (Japan)	3–2	(Japan) Yokohama F. Marinos

=== Quarter-finals ===
The quarter-finals were played over one leg.

West Region
Team 1	Score	Team 2
Al-Duhail (Qatar)	2–1	(Saudi Arabia) Al-Shabab
Foolad (Iran)	0–1	(Saudi Arabia) Al-Hilal

East Region
Team 1	Score	Team 2
Vissel Kobe (Japan)	1–3 (a.e.t.)	(South Korea) Jeonbuk Hyundai Motors
Urawa Red Diamonds (Japan)	4–0	(Thailand) BG Pathum United

=== Semi-finals ===
The semi-finals were played over one leg.

West Region
Team 1	Score	Team 2
Al-Duhail (Qatar)	0–7	(Saudi Arabia) Al-Hilal

East Region
Team 1	Score	Team 2
Jeonbuk Hyundai Motors (South Korea)	2–2 (a.e.t.) (1–3 p)	(Japan) Urawa Red Diamonds

=== Final ===
The final was played over two legs.

29 April 2023
20:30 UTC+3

Al-Hilal (Saudi Arabian Football Federation)	1–1	(Japan Football Association) Urawa Red Diamonds
S. Al-Dawsari 13'	Report	Koroki 53'

King Fahd International Stadium, Riyadh
Attendance: 50,881
Referee: Ahmed Al-Kaf (Oman)
6 May 2023
18:00 UTC+9

Urawa Red Diamonds (Japan Football Association)	1–0	(Saudi Arabian Football Federation) Al-Hilal
Carrillo 48' (o.g.)	Report

Saitama Stadium 2002, Saitama
Attendance: 53,574
Referee: Ma Ning (China)

Urawa Red Diamonds won 2–1 on aggregate.

== Top scorers ==
Team eliminated for this round.
Player was not in the team but the team was still active for this round.

Rank	Player	Team	MD1	MD2	MD3	MD4	MD5	MD6	R16	QF	SF	F1	F2	Total
1	(Belgium) Edmilson Junior	(Qatar) Al-Duhail	1		3		2	2						8
2	(Nigeria) Odion Ighalo	(Saudi Arabia) Al-Hilal				2			1		4			7
2	(Brazil) Zeca	(South Korea) Daegu FC	3		1		1	1	1					7
4	(Brazil) Bergson	(Malaysia) Johor Darul Ta'zim	3	1			2							6
4	(Japan) Yusuke Matsuo	(Japan) Urawa Red Diamonds	1				2	2			1			6
4	(Kenya) Michael Olunga	(Qatar) Al-Duhail		1		1		2		2				6
7	(Argentina) Federico Cartabia	(United Arab Emirates) Shabab Al-Ahli		1	1	1	2							5
7	(Brazil) Carlos	(Saudi Arabia) Al-Shabab		2		2	1							5
7	(Sweden) David Moberg Karlsson	(Japan) Urawa Red Diamonds	1				1		2	1				5
10	(Ivory Coast) Yohan Boli	(Qatar) Al-Rayyan	2				1							4
10	(Saudi Arabia) Salem Al-Dawsari	(Saudi Arabia) Al-Hilal				1	1				1	1		4
10	(Japan) Yu Kobayashi	(Japan) Kawasaki Frontale		2		2								4
10	(Denmark) Kasper Junker	(Japan) Urawa Red Diamonds	1						2		1			4
10	(Turkmenistan) Arslanmyrat Amanow	(Turkmenistan) Ahal					1	3						4

Note: Goals scored in the qualifying play-offs and matches voided by AFC are not counted when determining top scorer (Regulations Article 64.4).

== Awards ==
- Best Player: (Japan) Hiroki Sakai (Urawa Red Diamonds)

Fans' Best XI
Position	Winners	Nominees
Goalkeeper	(Saudi Arabia) Abdullah Al-Mayouf	(Saudi Arabia) Fawaz Al-Qarni (Thailand) Kittipong Phuthawchueak (Japan) Shusaku Nishikawa (Iran) Shahab Gordan
Right-back	(Saudi Arabia) Saud Abdulhamid	(Japan) Hiroki Sakai (Saudi Arabia) Fawaz Al-Sqoor (South Korea) Hwang Jae-won
Centre-backs	(Saudi Arabia) Ali Al-Bulaihi (Denmark) Alexander Scholz	(Iran) Aref Aghasi (Singapore) Irfan Fandi
Left-back	(Saudi Arabia) Mohammed Al-Breik	(Malaysia) La'Vere Corbin-Ong (South Korea) Kim Jin-su (Iraq) Dhurgham Ismail
Midfielders	(Iraq) Ibrahim Bayesh (Saudi Arabia) Nawaf Al-Abed (Saudi Arabia) Salem Al-Dawsari	(Japan) Ataru Esaka (Saudi Arabia) Salman Al-Faraj (Brazil) Bruno Lamas (Japan) Yusuke Matsuo (Thailand) Worachit Kanitsribampen (Argentina) Federico Cartabia (Japan) Takahiro Sekine
Forwards	(Brazil) Bérgson (Brazil) Zeca (Nigeria) Odion Ighalo	(Belgium) Edmilson Junior (Denmark) Kasper Junker (Algeria) Yacine Brahimi (Kenya) Michael Olunga (Singapore) Ikhsan Fandi (Ivory Coast) Yohan Boli (Japan) Yu Kobayashi

== See also ==
- 2022 AFC Cup
