= 2024 Urawa Red Diamonds season =

Urawa Red Diamonds
2024 season
- Manager: Per-Mathias Høgmo
- Stadium: Saitama Stadium 2002 and Urawa Komaba Stadium; Saitama, Saitama
- J1 League: 13th
- Emperor's Cup: Disqualified
- J.League Cup: Round 1
- Top goalscorer: League: Thiago Santana (12 goals); All: Thiago Santana (13 goals)
- Highest home attendance: 55,184 vs Albirex Niigata (8 December; J1 League)
- Lowest home attendance: 16,787 vs Shonan Bellmare (6 July; J1 League)
- Average home league attendance: 37,519

The 2024 Urawa Red Diamonds season was their 74th season in existence and the 23rd consecutive season in the J1 League. As well as the domestic league, they competed in the J.League Cup. However, they did not participated in the 2024 Emperor's Cup due to a ban imposed by the JFA following violence by fans in the previous season. They were the first team to be banned from the tournament.

== Squad ==
=== Season squad ===
Squad no.	Name	Nationality	Position(s)	Date of birth (age at start of season)
Goalkeepers
1	Shusaku Nishikawa	(Japan)	GK	18 June 1986 (aged 37)
16	Ayumi Niekawa	(Japan)	GK	12 May 1994 (aged 29)
31	Shun Yoshida	(Japan)	GK	28 November 1996 (aged 27)
Defenders
4	Hirokazu Ishihara	(Japan)	RB / RM	26 February 1999 (aged 24)
5	Marius Høibråten	(Norway)	CB	23 January 1995 (aged 29)
20	Yota Sato	(Japan)	CB	10 September 1998 (aged 25)
23	Rikito Inoue	(Japan)	CB	9 March 1997 (aged 26)
66	Ayumu Ohata	(Japan)	LB	27 April 2001 (aged 22)
Midfielders
8	Yoshio Koizumi	(Japan)	AM / CM	5 October 1996 (aged 27)
10	Shoya Nakajima	(Japan)	AM / LW / RW	23 August 1994 (aged 29)
11	Samuel Gustafson	(Sweden)	DM / CM	11 January 1995 (aged 29)
13	Ryoma Watanabe	(Japan)	RM	2 October 1996 (aged 27)
14	Takahiro Sekine	(Japan)	LM / RM	19 April 1995 (aged 28)
21	Tomoaki Okubo	(Japan)	RW / LW	23 July 1998 (aged 25)
24	Yusuke Matsuo	(Japan)	LW	23 July 1997 (aged 26)
25	Kaito Yasui	(Japan)	AM / DM	9 February 2000 (aged 24)
27	Ekanit Panya	(Thailand)	AM	21 October 1999 (aged 24)
29	Yota Horiuchi	(Japan)	DM	8 July 2004 (aged 19)
35	Tomoya Ugajin	(Japan)	LM / LB	23 March 1988 (aged 35)
47	Hidetoshi Takeda	(Japan)	RM / AM	15 September 2001 (aged 22)
Forwards
7	Hiroki Abe	(Japan)	LW / FW	28 January 1999 (aged 25)
9	Bryan Linssen	(Netherlands)	FW	8 October 1990 (aged 33)
12	Thiago Santana	(Brazil)	FW	4 February 1993 (aged 31)
30	Shinzo Koroki	(Japan)	FW	31 July 1986 (aged 37)
38	Naoki Maeda	(Japan)	RW / SS	17 November 1994 (aged 29)

Last updated: 20 January 2024.
Source: Urawa Reds website

== Transfers ==
=== Arrivals ===
Date	Position	Player	From	Type	Source
25 December 2023	DF	(Japan) Hirokazu Ishihara	(Japan) Shonan Bellmare	Full	
27 December 2023	DF	(Japan) Yota Sato	(Japan) Gamba Osaka	Full	
27 December 2023	DF	(Japan) Rikito Inoue	(Japan) Kyoto Sanga	Full	
29 December 2023	MF	(Japan) Hidetoshi Takeda	(Japan) Mito Hollyhock	Loan return	
29 December 2023	MF	(Sweden) Samuel Gustafson	(Sweden) BK Häcken	Full	
7 January 2024	DF	(Japan) Ryoma Watanabe	(Japan) FC Tokyo	Full	
7 January 2024	FW	(Japan) Naoki Maeda	(Japan) Nagoya Grampus	Full	
9 January 2024	MF	(Japan) Tomoya Ugajin	(Japan) FC Gifu	Full	
12 January 2024	MF	(Norway) Ola Solbakken	(Italy) AS Roma	Loan	
13 January 2024	FW	(Brazil) Thiago Santana	(Japan) Shimizu S-Pulse	Full	
13 January 2024	MF	(Japan) Yusuke Matsuo	(Belgium) KVC Westerlo	Loan return	

=== Departures ===
Date	Position	Player	To	Type	Source
27 November 2023	FW	(Netherlands) Alex Schalk		Released	
27 November 2023	FW	(Guinea) José Kanté		Retired	
8 December 2023	DF	(Japan) Ryuya Fukushima		Released	
26 December 2023	DF	(Japan) Tetsuya Chinen	(Japan) Vegalta Sendai	Full	
26 December 2023	DF	(Japan) Yuta Miyamoto	(Japan) Kyoto Sanga	Loan	
29 December 2023	DF	(Japan) Tomoya Inukai	(Japan) Kashiwa Reysol	Full	
4 January 2024	MF	(Japan) Kai Matsuzaki	(Japan) Shimizu S-Pulse	Full	
5 January 2024	DF	(Japan) Yudai Fujiwara	(Japan) Oita Trinita	Loan	
7 January 2024	DF	(Japan) Kazuaki Mawatari	(Japan) Matsumoto Yamaga	Full	
8 January 2024	DF	(Japan) Kota Kudo	(Japan) Giravanz Kitakyushu	Loan	
9 January 2024	MF	(Japan) Kai Shibato	(Japan) FC Machida Zelvia	Loan	
9 January 2024	DF	(Japan) Takuya Iwanami	(Japan) Vissel Kobe	Full	
11 January 2024	FW	(Denmark) Kasper Junker	(Japan) Nagoya Grampus	Full	
12 January 2024	MF	(Japan) Yuichi Hirano	(Japan) Cerezo Osaka	Full	
20 January 2024	MF	(Japan) Takahiro Akimoto	(Belgium) OH Leuven	Loan	
1 February 2024	GK	(Japan) Zion Suzuki	(Belgium) Sint-Truiden	Full	

== Friendlies ==
31 July 2024 J.League International Series	Urawa Red Diamonds (Japan)	1–4	(England) Newcastle United	Saitama, Japan
19:30 JST (11:30 BST)	Nitta 23'; Ito (penalty missed) 30'	Report	Isak 3'; Murphy 45', 47'; Hall 58'	Stadium: Saitama Stadium 2002; Attendance: 13,763

== Competitions ==
=== J1 League ===
Pos	Team	Pld	W	D	L	GF	GA	GD	Pts
11	Nagoya Grampus	38	15	5	18	44	47	−3	50
12	Avispa Fukuoka	38	12	14	12	33	38	−5	50
13	Urawa Red Diamonds	38	12	12	14	49	45	+4	48
14	Kyoto Sanga	38	12	11	15	43	55	−12	47
15	Shonan Bellmare	38	12	9	17	53	58	−5	45

Source: JLeague.co, JLeague.jp, J.League Data Site
Rules for classification: 1) Points; 2) Goal difference; 3) Goals scored; 4) Head-to-head points; 5) Head-to-head goal difference; 6) Head-to-head goals scored; 7) Fewer disciplinary points.

==== Results by matchday ====
Round	1	2	3	4	5	6	7	8	9	10	11	12	13	14	15	16	17	18	19	20	21	22	23	24	25	26	27	28	29	30	31	32	33	34	35	36	37	38
Ground	A	H	A	A	H	A	H	A	H	H	A	H	A	H	A	H	A	A	H																			
Result	L	D	W	D	W	L	W	L	L	W	L	W	W	W	D	L	D	L	D																			
Position	18	18	12	12	8	10	6	11	12	11	12	9	6	4	6	6	8	10	11																			

Updated to match(es) played on 22 June 2024. Source: J. League Data Site
A = Away; H = Home; W = Win; D = Draw; L = Loss

==== Matches ====
The full league fixtures were released on 23 January 2024.

23 February 1	Sanfrecce Hiroshima	2–0	Urawa Red Diamonds	Hiroshima
14:00 JST	Ohashi 45', 55'	Report		Stadium: EDION Peace Wing Hiroshima; Attendance: 27,545; Referee: Futoshi Nakamura

3 March 2	Urawa Red Diamonds	1–1	Tokyo Verdy	Saitama
16:04 JST	Scholz 89' (pen.)	Report	Kimura 42'	Stadium: Saitama Stadium 2002; Attendance: 50,863; Referee: Akihiko Ikeuchi

10 March 3	Hokkaido Consadole Sapporo	0–1	Urawa Red Diamonds	Sapporo
13:05 JST	Arano (yellow card) 59'; Kobayashi (yellow card) 65'	Report	Sakai 30'	Stadium: Sapporo Dome; Referee: Ryo Tanimoto

17 March 4	Shonan Bellmare	4–4	Urawa Red Diamonds	Hiratsuka
15:03 JST	Lukian 23', 74'; Suzuki 32', 46'	Report	Koroki 11'; Matsuo 55'; Maeda 64'; Gustafson 81'	Stadium: Lemon Gas Stadium; Attendance: 12,628; Referee: Lewis Smith

30 March 5	Urawa Red Diamonds	2–1	Avispa Fukuoka	Saitama
15:03 JST	Watanabe 65'; Thiago Santana 73' (pen.)	Report	Zahedi 28'	Stadium: Saitama Stadium 2002; Attendance: 37,826; Referee: Yusuke Araki

3 April 6	FC Tokyo	2–1	Urawa Red Diamonds	Tokyo
19:33 JST	Araki 50'; Matsuki 58'	Report	Thiago Santana 24'	Stadium: Japan National Stadium; Attendance: 49,005; Referee: Akihiko Ikeuchi

7 April 7	Urawa Red Diamonds	3–0	Sagan Tosu	Saitama
15:03 JST	Thiago Santana 5'; Matsuo 53'; Okubo 83'	Report		Stadium: Saitama Stadium 2002; Attendance: 28,576; Referee: Hiroki Kasahara

12 April 8	Kashiwa Reysol	1–0	Urawa Red Diamonds	Kashiwa
19:03 JST	Kinoshita 72'	Report		Stadium: Sankyo Frontier Kashiwa Stadium; Attendance: 14,201; Referee: Koichiro Fukushima

20 April 9	Urawa Red Diamonds	0–1	Gamba Osaka	Saitama
16:03 JST		Report	Sakamoto 78'	Stadium: Saitama Stadium 2002; Attendance: 41,377; Referee: Yuichi Nishimura

28 April 10	Urawa Red Diamonds	2–1	Nagoya Grampus	Saitama
15:03 JST	Yasui 24'; Thiago Santana 70' (pen.)	Report	Izumi 78'	Stadium: Saitama Stadium 2002; Attendance: 42,265; Referee: Yusuke Araki

3 May 11	Kawasaki Frontale	3–1	Urawa Red Diamonds	Kawasaki
16:03 JST	Wakizaka 18'; Sasaki 49'; Ienaga 90+3'	Report	Okubo 35'	Stadium: Uvance Todoroki Stadium by Fujitsu; Attendance: 23,457; Referee: Akihiko Ikeuchi

6 May 12	Urawa Red Diamonds	2–1	Yokohama F. Marinos	Saitama
17:03 JST	Ito 42', 66'	Report	Kato 86'	Stadium: Saitama Stadium 2002; Attendance: 40,579; Referee: Futoshi Nakamura

11 May 13	Albirex Niigata	2–4	Urawa Red Diamonds	Niigata
14:03 JST	Ota 75'; Nagakura 87'	Report	Thiago Santana 4', 90+12' (pen.); Gustafson 65'; Maeda 69'	Stadium: Denka Big Swan Stadium; Attendance: 24,652; Referee: Hirokia Kasahara

15 May 14	Urawa Red Diamonds	3–0	Kyoto Sanga	Saitama
19:33 JST	Yasui 42'; Watanabe 55'; Thiago Santana 77'	Report	Appiah Tawiah (red card) 90+5'	Stadium: Saitama Stadium 2002; Attendance: 20,737; Referee: Koji Takasaki

19 May 15	Júbilo Iwata	1–1	Urawa Red Diamonds	Fukuroi
14:03 JST	Kaneko 71'	Report	Høibråten 68'	Stadium: Shizuoka Stadium ECOPA; Attendance: 20,861; Referee: Yuichi Nishimura

26 May 16	Urawa Red Diamonds	1–2	Machida Zelvia	Saitama
16:03 JST	Ito 54'	Report	Hirakawa 52'; Shimoda 90+6' (pen.)	Stadium: Saitama Stadium 2002; Attendance: 39,460; Referee: Sascha Stegemann

1 June 17	Urawa Red Diamonds	1–1	Vissel Kobe	Saitama
16:03 JST	Nakajima 61'	Report	Ide 15'	Stadium: Saitama Stadium 2002; Attendance: 45,976; Referee: Futoshi Nakamura

15 June 18	Cerezo Osaka	2–1	Urawa Red Diamonds	Osaka
19:03 JST	Lucas Fernandes 42'; Okuda 49'	Report	Linssen 77'	Stadium: Yodoko Sakura Stadium; Attendance: 19,798; Referee: Darren England

22 June 19	Urawa Red Diamonds	2–2	Kashima Antlers	Saitama
19:03 JST	Takeda 77', 90+2'	Report	Suzuki 3', 42'	Stadium: Saitama Stadium 2002; Attendance: 48,638; Referee: Jumpei Iida

26 June 20	Nagoya Grampus	0–1	Urawa Red Diamonds	Nagoya
19:03 JST		Report	Watanabe 7'	Stadium: Toyota Stadium; Attendance: 15,796; Referee: Akihiko Ikeuchi

30 June 21	Urawa Red Diamonds	3–0	Júbilo Iwata	Saitama
18:33 JST	Ishihara 21'; Watanabe 52'; Ito 74'	Report		Stadium: Saitama Stadium 2002; Attendance: 32,079; Referee: Shu Kawamata

6 July 22	Urawa Red Diamonds	2–3	Shonan Bellmare	Saitama
19:03 JST	Thiago Santana 62', 74'	Report	Tanaka 32'; Ishii 90'; Lukian 90+2'	Stadium: Urawa Komaba Stadium; Attendance: 16,787; Referee: Masuya Ueda

14 July 23	Kyoto Sanga FC	0–0	Urawa Red Diamonds	Kameoka
18:33 JST		Report		Stadium: Sanga Stadium by Kyocera; Attendance: 18,730; Referee: Keigo Sendachi

20 July 24	Urawa Red Diamonds	3–4	Hokkaido Consadole Sapporo	Saitama
19:03 JST	Thiago Santana 77'; Nitta 81'; Ito 90'	Report	Daihachi Okamura 37'; Musashi Suzuki 45+2', 57'; Yoshiaki Komai 51'	Stadium: Saitama Stadium 2002; Attendance: 35,429; Referee: Hayato Shimizu

11 August 25	Sagan Tosu	1–1	Urawa Red Diamonds	Tosu, Saga
19:04 JST	Marcelo Ryan 84'	Report	Yusuke Matsuo 73'	Stadium: Ekimae Real Estate Stadium; Attendance: 14,972; Referee: Futoshi Nakamura

17 August 26	Kashima Antlers	0–0	Urawa Red Diamonds	Kashima
18:03 JST		Report		Stadium: Kashima Soccer Stadium; Attendance: 33,295; Referee: Takafumi Mikuriya

31 August 27	FC Machida Zelvia	2–2	Urawa Red Diamonds	Tokyo
18:03 JST	Oh Se-hun 49'; Erik 90+2'	Report	Sekine 37'; Thiago Santana 87'	Stadium: Japan National Stadium; Attendance: 48,887; Referee: Hiroyuki Kimura

14 September 28	Gamba Osaka	0–1	Urawa Red Diamonds	Suita
19:03 JST		Report	Sekine 49'	Stadium: Panasonic Stadium Suita; Attendance: 31,016; Referee: Futoshi Nakamura

21 September 29	Urawa Red Diamonds	0–2	FC Tokyo	Saitama
		Report	Inoue 9' (o.g.); Araki 17'	Stadium: Saitama Stadium 2002; Attendance: 41,379; Referee: Ryo Tanimoto

28 September 30	Vissel Kobe	1–0	Urawa Red Diamonds	Kobe
19:03 JST	Yoshinori Muto 16'	Report		Stadium: Noevir Stadium Kobe; Attendance: 22,109; Referee: Jumpei Iida

5 October 31	Urawa Red Diamonds	0–1	Cerezo Osaka	Saitama
16:03 JST		Report	Tameda 17'	Stadium: Saitama Stadium 2002; Attendance: 32,129; Referee: Masayu Ueda

19 October 32	Tokyo Verdy	2–1	Urawa Red Diamonds	Tokyo
	Yuto Tsunushima 59', 76'	Report	Watanabe 27'	Stadium: Ajinomoto Stadium; Attendance: 27,886; Referee: Yuichi Nishimura

23 October 33	Urawa Red Diamonds	1–0	Kashiwa Reysol	Saitama
	Thiago Santana 90+10'	Report		Stadium: Saitama Stadium 2002; Attendance: 26,304; Referee: Koichiro Fukushima

30 October 34	Yokohama F. Marinos	0–0	Urawa Red Diamonds	Yokohama
19:03 JST		Report		Stadium: Nissan Stadium; Attendance: 21,397; Referee: Akihiko Ikeuchi

9 November 35	Urawa Red Diamonds	3–0	Sanfrecce Hiroshima	Saitama
15:03 JST	Matsuo 45'; Linssen 56'; Haraguchi 86'	Report		Stadium: Saitama Stadium 2002; Attendance: 42,076; Referee: Koei Koya

22 November 36	Urawa Red Diamonds	1–1	Kawasaki Frontale	Saitama
19:00 JST	Watanabe 23'	Report	Kobayashi 55'	Stadium: Saitama Stadium 2002; Attendance: 35,188; Referee: Masuya Ueda

29 November 37	Avispa Fukuoka	1–0	Urawa Red Diamonds	Fukuoka
14:03 JST	Konno 40'	Report		Stadium: Best Denki Stadium; Attendance: 17,161; Referee: Atsushi Kamimura

7 December 38	Urawa Red Diamonds	0–0	Albirex Niigata	Saitama
14:04 JST		Report		Stadium: Saitama Stadium 2002; Attendance: 55,184; Referee: Yuichi Nishimura

=== J.League Cup ===
The 2024 J.League Cup was expanded so that all 60 J.League clubs would participate.

24 April 2024 First round – Match 2	Gainare Tottori	2–5	Urawa Red Diamonds	Tottori
19:33 JST	Tanaka 36'; Matsuki 64'	Report	Takeda 13'; Thiago Santana 17' (pen.); Ito 52'; Nakajima 55', 90+3'	Stadium: Axis Bird Stadium; Attendance: 7,677; Referee: Koji Takasaki

22 May 2024 First round – Match 3	V-Varen Nagasaki	1–0	Urawa Red Diamonds	Isahaya
19:03 JST	Moyo (red card) 70'; Juanma 78'	Report		Stadium: Transcosmos Stadium Nagasaki; Attendance: 7,872; Referee: Yoshimi Yamashita

== Statistics ==
=== Goalscorers ===
The list is sorted by shirt number when total goals are equal.

Rnk	Pos	No.	Player	J1	JLC	Total
1	FW	12	(Brazil) Thiago Santana	7	1	8
2	MF	3	(Japan) Atsuki Ito	3	1	4
3	MF	10	(Japan) Shoya Nakajima	1	2	3
3	MF	47	(Japan) Hidetoshi Takeda	2	1	3
5	MF	24	(Japan) Yusuke Matsuo	2	0	2
5	MF	11	(Sweden) Samuel Gustafson	2	0	2
5	MF	13	(Japan) Ryoma Watanabe	2	0	2
5	MF	21	(Japan) Tomoaki Okubo	2	0	2
5	MF	25	(Japan) Kaito Yasui	2	0	2
5	FW	38	(Japan) Naoki Maeda	2	0	2
11	DF	2	(Japan) Hiroki Sakai	1	0	1
11	DF	5	(Norway) Marius Høibråten	1	0	1
11	FW	9	(Netherlands) Bryan Linssen	1	0	1
11	DF	28	(Denmark) Alexander Scholz	1	0	1
11	FW	30	(Japan) Shinzo Koroki	1	0	1
TOTAL				30	5	35

Last updated: 22 June 2024.
Source: jleague.co
