= 2023 Urawa Red Diamonds season =

Urawa Red Diamonds
2023 season
- Manager: Maciej Skorża
- Stadium: Saitama Stadium 2002 and Urawa Komaba Stadium; Saitama, Saitama
- J1 League: 4th
- Emperor's Cup: Third round
- J.League Cup: Runners-up
- AFC Champions League: Group stage
- FIFA Club World Cup: Fourth place
- Top goalscorer: League: José Kanté (8); All: José Kanté (14)
- Highest home attendance: 45,575 vs Kashima Antlers (4 June; J1 League)
- Lowest home attendance: 5,351 vs Kansai University (7 June; Emperor's Cup)
- Average home league attendance: 26,836
- Biggest win: 6–0 vs Hanoi FC (4 October; AFC Champions League)
- Biggest defeat: 3–0 vs Nagoya Grampus (2 August;Third Round Emperor's Cup); 3–0 vs Manchester City (19 December; Semifinal Club World Cup)
Home colours	Away colours

The 2023 Urawa Red Diamonds season was their 73rd season in existence and the 23rd consecutive season in the J1 League. In addition to the league, the club competed in the Emperor's Cup, the J. League Cup, the 2023–24 AFC Champions League and the 2023 FIFA Club World Cup.

== Players ==
As of 11 August 2023.

Note: Flags indicate national team as defined under FIFA eligibility rules; some limited exceptions apply. Players may hold more than one non-FIFA nationality.

No.	Pos.	Nation	Player
1	GK	JPN	Shusaku Nishikawa
2	DF	JPN	Hiroki Sakai (captain)
3	MF	JPN	Atsuki Ito
4	DF	JPN	Takuya Iwanami
5	DF	NOR	Marius Høibråten
6	DF	JPN	Kazuaki Mawatari
7	FW	JPN	Hiroki Abe
8	MF	JPN	Yoshio Koizumi
9	FW	NED	Bryan Linssen
10	MF	JPN	Shoya Nakajima
11	FW	GUI	José Kanté
14	MF	JPN	Takahiro Sekine
15	DF	JPN	Takahiro Akimoto
16	GK	JPN	Ayumi Niekawa
17	FW	NED	Alex Schalk
18	FW	JPN	Toshiki Takahashi

No.	Pos.	Nation	Player
19	MF	JPN	Ken Iwao (vice-captain)
20	DF	JPN	Tetsuya Chinen
21	MF	JPN	Tomoaki Okubo
22	MF	JPN	Kai Shibato
24	DF	JPN	Yuta Miyamoto
25	MF	JPN	Kaito Yasui
26	DF	JPN	Takuya Ogiwara
27	MF	THA	Ekanit Panya (on loan from Muangthong United)
28	DF	DEN	Alexander Scholz (vice-captain)
29	MF	JPN	Yota Horiuchi
30	FW	JPN	Shinzo Koroki (vice-captain)
31	GK	JPN	Shun Yoshida
35	MF	JPN	Jumpei Hayakawa ^{Type 2}
40	MF	JPN	Yuichi Hirano
66	DF	JPN	Ayumu Ohata

=== Out on loan ===
Note: Flags indicate national team as defined under FIFA eligibility rules; some limited exceptions apply. Players may hold more than one non-FIFA nationality.

No.	Pos.	Nation	Player
—	DF	JPN	Yudai Fujiwara (On loan at Machida Zelvia)
—	DF	JPN	Kota Kudo (On loan at Fujieda MYFC)
—	DF	JPN	Ryuya Fukushima (On loan at Kochi United)
—	MF	JPN	Kai Matsuzaki (On loan at Vegalta Sendai)

No.	Pos.	Nation	Player
—	MF	JPN	Hidetoshi Takeda (On loan at Mito HollyHock)
—	FW	DEN	Kasper Junker (On loan at Nagoya Grampus)
—	FW	JPN	Rei Kihara (On loan at Nagano Parceiro)

== Transfers ==
Transfers in
Join on	Pos.	Player	Moving from	Transfer type
3 Jul	MF	(Japan) Hiroki Abe	(Spain) FC Barcelona B	Free transfer
1 Jun	DF	(Japan) Yuta Miyamoto	(Belgium) KMSK Deinze	Loan return
13 Mar	FW	(Guinea) José Kanté	(China) Cangzhou Mighty Lions	Free transfer
Pre-season	GK	(Japan) Shun Yoshida	(Japan) Oita Trinita	Full transfer
Pre-season	DF	(Norway) Marius Høibråten	(Norway) FK Bodø/Glimt	Full transfer
Pre-season	DF	(Japan) Takuya Ogiwara	(Japan) Kyoto Sanga	Loan return
Pre-season	MF	(Japan) Ken Iwao	(Japan) Tokushima Vortis	Full transfer; Loan made permanent
Pre-season	MF	(Japan) Yota Horiuchi	Urawa Reds U18s	Promotion
Pre-season	FW	(Japan) Toshiki Takahashi	(Japan) Roasso Kumamoto	Full transfer
Pre-season	FW	(Japan) Shinzo Koroki	(Japan) Consadole Sapporo	Loan return

Transfers out
Leave on	Pos.	Player	Moving to	Transfer type
3 Jul	MF	(Japan) Kai Matsuzaki	(Japan) Vegalta Sendai	Loan transfer
Pre-season	GK	(Japan) Ryo Ishii	(Japan) Thespakusatsu Gunma	Full transfer
Pre-season	DF	(Japan) Yuta Miyamoto	(Belgium) KMSK Deinze	Loan transfer
Pre-season	DF	(Japan) Yudai Fujiwara	(Japan) Machida Zelvia	Loan transfer
Pre-season	DF	(Japan) Kota Kudo	(Japan) Fujieda MYFC	Loan transfer
Pre-season	DF	(Japan) Ryuya Fukushima	(Japan) Kochi United	Loan transfer
Pre-season	MF	(Japan) Ataru Esaka	(South Korea) Ulsan Hyundai	Full transfer
Pre-season	MF	(Japan) Daiki Kaneko	(Japan) Kyoto Sanga	Full transfer; Loan made permanent
Pre-season	MF	(Japan) Hidetoshi Takeda	(Japan) Mito HollyHock	Loan transfer
Pre-season	FW	(Japan) Kenyu Sugimoto	(Japan) Júbilo Iwata	Full transfer; Loan made permanent
Pre-season	FW	(Denmark) Kasper Junker	(Japan) Nagoya Grampus	Loan transfer
Pre-season	FW	(Japan) Rei Kihara	(Japan) Nagano Parceiro	Loan transfer

=== Pre-season friendlies ===
15 January Okinawa Training Camp	Urawa Red Diamonds	5–1	Okinawa SV	Kin
15:30 JST	Sekine 4'; Moberg 26'; Yasui 45'; Koroki 46'; Takahashi 82'	Report	Ichiki 61'	Stadium: Kin Town Football Center
Note: The match was played with two halves lasting 45 minutes each.

21 January Okinawa Training Camp	Urawa Red Diamonds	7–0	Okinawa International University	Kin
14:30 JST	Okubo 5', 9'; Ito 51'; Schalk 72'; Hayakawa 86'; Horiuchi 90'; Takahashi 120'	Report		Stadium: Kin Town Football Center
Note: The match was played with two halves lasting 45 minutes each and one half lasting 30 minutes.

25 January Okinawa Training Camp	Urawa Red Diamonds	4–1	Omiya Ardija	Kin
15:00 JST	Koizumi 13', 32'; Akimoto 45+1'; Sekine 57'	Report	Tomiyama 73'	Stadium: Kin Town Football Center
Note: The match was played with two halves lasting 45 minutes each.

29 January Okinawa Training Camp	Urawa Red Diamonds	3–4	Sagan Tosu	Kin
11:30 JST	Linssen 7', 35'; Koroki 62'	Report	Naganuma 7'; Fujihara 106', 129'; Kabayama 116'	Stadium: Kin Town Football Center
Note: The match was played with three halves lasting 45 minutes each.

== Competitions ==
=== Overall record ===
Competition	First match	Last match	Starting round	Final position	Record							
Competition	First match	Last match	Starting round	Final position	Pld	W	D	L	GF	GA	GD	Win %
J1 League	18 February	2 December	Matchday 1	4th	34	15	12	7	42	27	+15	44.12
Emperor's Cup	7 June	2 August	Second round	4th Round	3	2	0	1	2	3	−1	66.67
J.League Cup	8 March	4 November	Group stage	Runners-up	10	3	5	2	7	7	+0	30.00
2022 AFC Champions League	29 April	6 May	Final	Winner	2	1	1	0	2	1	+1	50.00
2023 AFC Champions League	22 August	6 December	Play-off Round	Group Stage	6	2	1	3	12	9	+3	33.33
FIFA Club World Cup	15 December	December	Second round		3	1	0	2	1	3	−2	33.33
Total					58	24	19	15	66	50	+16	41.38

Last updated: 15 December 2023
Source: Competitions

=== J1 League ===
==== League table ====
Pos	Team	Pld	W	D	L	GF	GA	GD	Pts	Qualification or relegation
2	Yokohama F. Marinos	34	19	7	8	63	40	+23	64	Qualification for the AFC Champions League Elite league stage
3	Sanfrecce Hiroshima	34	17	7	10	42	28	+14	58	Qualification for the AFC Champions League Two group stage
4	Urawa Red Diamonds	34	15	12	7	42	27	+15	57	
5	Kashima Antlers	34	14	10	10	43	34	+9	52	
6	Nagoya Grampus	34	14	10	10	41	36	+5	52	

Source: JLeague.jp, J.League Data Site
Rules for classification: 1) Points; 2) Goal difference; 3) Goals scored; 4) Head-to-head points; 5) Head-to-head goal difference; 6) Head-to-head goals scored; 7) Fewer disciplinary points.

==== Results summary ====
Overall								Home						Away					
Pld	W	D	L	GF	GA	GD	Pts	W	D	L	GF	GA	GD	W	D	L	GF	GA	GD
19	10	6	3	27	15	+12	36	6	2	1	18	9	+9	4	4	2	9	6	+3

Last updated: 2 July 2023.
Source: Soccerway

==== Matches ====
The full league fixtures were released on 20 January 2023.

18 February 1	FC Tokyo	2–0	Urawa Red Diamonds	Tokyo
14:00 JST	Higashi (yellow card) 4'; Koizumi 66' (o.g.); Watanabe 73'	Report	Moberg (yellow card) 25'; Sakai (yellow card) 29'	Stadium: Ajinomoto Stadium; Attendance: 38,051; Referee: Hiroki Kasahara

25 February 2	Yokohama F. Marinos	2–0	Urawa Red Diamonds	Yokohama
14:00 JST	Anderson Lopes 18'; Yan Matheus 89'	Report	Sakai (yellow card) 68'; Akimoto (yellow card) 81'	Stadium: Nissan Stadium; Attendance: 34,035; Referee: Akihiko Ikeuchi

4 March 3	Urawa Red Diamonds	2–1	Cerezo Osaka	Saitama
15:00 JST	Scholz 61' (pen.); Yasui 82'	Report	Iwao 33' (o.g.); Kagawa (yellow card) 86'	Stadium: Urawa Komaba Stadium; Attendance: 18,437; Referee: Hayato Shimizu

11 March 4	Vissel Kobe	0–1	Urawa Red Diamonds	Kobe
14:00 JST	Sakai (yellow card) 64'	Report	Ito 21'; Sekine (yellow card) 71'	Stadium: Noevir Stadium Kobe; Attendance: 21,223; Referee: Yuichi Nishimura

18 March 5	Urawa Red Diamonds	2–1	Albirex Niigata	Saitama
15:00 JST	Sakai 35'; Akimoto 45+2'; Koizumi (yellow card) 68'	Report	Shusuke Ota 10'; Danilo Gomes (yellow card) 83'	Stadium: Urawa Komaba Stadium; Attendance: 15,167; Referee: Koichiro Fukushima

31 March 6	Kashiwa Reysol	0–3	Urawa Red Diamonds	Kashiwa
19:00 JST	Koga (yellow card) 66'	Report	Sekine (yellow card) 25'; Koroki 44'; Schalk 75'; Akimoto 81'; Hoibraten (yellow card) 90'	Stadium: Sankyo Frontier Kashiwa Stadium; Attendance: 11,620; Referee: Tom Bramall (England)

9 April 7	Nagoya Grampus	0–0	Urawa Red Diamonds	Nagoya
15:00 JST		Report	Akimoto (yellow card) 18'; Yasui (yellow card) 77'	Stadium: Toyota Stadium; Attendance: 22,655; Referee: Yuichi Nishimura

15 April 8	Urawa Red Diamonds	4–1	Hokkaido Consadole Sapporo	Saitama
15:00 JST	Ogiwara (yellow card) 5'; Scholz 68'; Kanté (red card) 76'; Koroki 83' (pen.); Tanaka 90+5' (o.g.); Høibråten 90+8'		Fukumori (yellow card) 12'; Suga (yellow card) 22' (goal) 88'; Nakamura (red card) 34'; Kaneko (yellow card) 53'; Aoki (yellow card) 82'; Nakashima (yellow card) 90+7'	Stadium: Saitama Stadium 2002; Attendance: 38,574; Referee: Takafumi Mikuriya

23 April 9	Kawasaki Frontale	1–1	Urawa Red Diamonds	Kawasaki
16:00 JST	Wakizaka 48'	Report	Linssen 81'	Stadium: Kawasaki Todoroki Stadium; Attendance: 22,304; Referee: Ryo Tanimoto

10 May 10	Urawa Red Diamonds	0–2	Sagan Tosu	Saitama
19:30 JST		Report	Naganuma 70'; Tezuka 75'	Stadium: Saitama Stadium 2002; Attendance: 17,970; Referee: Hiroyuki Kimura

14 May 13	Urawa Red Diamonds	3–1	Gamba Osaka	Saitama
16:00 JST	Scholz 45+2' (pen.); Okubo 54'; Yasui 59'	Report	Jebali (yellow card) 2' (goal) 23'; Usami (yellow card) 29'	Stadium: Saitama Stadium 2002; Attendance: 31,440; Referee: Akihiko Ikeuchi

20 May 14	Avispa Fukuoka	0–0	Urawa Red Diamonds	Fukuoka
13:00 JST	Shigemi (yellow card) 72'	Report	Yasui (yellow card) 42'	Stadium: Best Denki Stadium; Attendance: 10,417; Referee: Hayato Shimizu

27 May 15	Kyoto Sanga	0–2	Urawa Red Diamonds	Kameoka
19:00 JST		Report	Ogiwara (yellow card) 15'; Iwao (yellow card) 15'; Koroki 52'; Sekine (yellow card) 72'; Kanté 90+3'	Stadium: Sanga Stadium by Kyocera; Attendance: 15,229; Referee: Takafumi Mikuriya

31 May 11	Urawa Red Diamonds	2–1	Sanfrecce Hiroshima	Saitama
19:30 JST	Sakai 72'; Ito 90+2'	Report	Morishima 50'; Notsuda (yellow card) 63'	Stadium: Saitama Stadium 2002; Attendance: 20,266; Referee: Jumpei Iida

4 June 16	Urawa Red Diamonds	0–0	Kashima Antlers	Saitama
17:00 JST	Høibråten (yellow card) 57'; Sakai (yellow card) 90+6'; Hayakawa (yellow card) 90+7'	Report	Nakama (yellow card) 84'; Hayakawa (yellow card) 90+6'; Pituca (yellow card) 90+7'	Stadium: Saitama Stadium 2002; Attendance: 45,575; Referee: Andrew Madley (England)

11 June 17	Yokohama FC	0–0	Urawa Red Diamonds	Yokohama
18:30 JST	Mateus Moraes (yellow card) 44'; Yuri Lara (yellow card) 50'	Report	Sakai (yellow card) 24'; Høibråten (yellow card) 77'	Stadium: Nippatsu Mitsuzawa Stadium; Attendance: 10,086; Referee: Hayato Shimizu

24 June 18	Urawa Red Diamonds	1–1	Kawasaki Frontale	Saitama
19:30 JST	Iwao (yellow card) 52'; Sekine 53'		Nishikawa 58' (o.g.); Kozuka (red card) 78'	Stadium: Saitama Stadium 2002; Attendance: 35,887; Referee: Yoshiro Imamura

28 June 12	Urawa Red Diamonds	4–1	Shonan Bellmare	Saitama
19:30 JST	Koroki 20'; Sekine 61', 65'; Kanté 90+2'	Report	Ohashi 53'	Stadium: Saitama Stadium 2002; Attendance: 18,208; Referee: Yusuke Araki

1 July 19	Sagan Tosu	1–2	Urawa Red Diamonds	Tosu
19:00 JST	Naganuma 7'	Report	Kanté 11'; Iwao 38'	Stadium: Ekimae Real Estate Stadium; Attendance: 11,224; Referee: Ryo Tanimoto

8 July 20	Urawa Red Diamonds	0–0	FC Tokyo	Saitama
19:00 JST	Ohata (yellow card) 53'	Report	Trevisan (yellow card) 61'	Stadium: Saitama Stadium 2002; Attendance: 49,108; Referee: Khamis Al-Marri

16 July 21	Cerezo Osaka	2–0	Urawa Red Diamonds	Osaka
19:00 JST	Ceará 6'; Croux 25'	Report	Okubo (yellow card) 49'; Scholz (penalty missed)	Stadium: Yodoko Sakura Stadium; Attendance: 21,007; Referee: Yudai Yamamoto

6 August 22	Urawa Red Diamonds	0–0	Yokohama F. Marinos	Saitama
19:00 JST	Okubo (yellow card) 53'; Iwao (yellow card) 56'	Report		Stadium: Saitama Stadium 2002; Attendance: 42,664; Referee: Hiroyuki Kimura

13 August 23	Sanfrecce Hiroshima	2–1	Urawa Red Diamonds	Hiroshima
18:00 JST	Kato 69'; Ben Khalifa 90+3'	Report	Kanté 29'	Stadium: Edion Stadium Hiroshima; Attendance: 21,108; Referee: Hayato Shimizu

18 August 24	Urawa Red Diamonds	1–0	Nagoya Grampus	Saitama
19:30 JST	Kanté 11'	Report		Stadium: Saitama Stadium 2002; Attendance: 32,578; Referee: Akihiko Ikeuchi

25 August 25	Shonan Bellmare	0–1	Urawa Red Diamonds	Hiratsuka
19:00 JST		Report	Kanté 64'	Stadium: Lemon Gas Stadium Hiratsuka; Attendance: 10,361; Referee: Jumpei Iida

2 September 26	Albirex Niigata	1–1	Urawa Red Diamonds	Niigata
18:03 JST	Komi 81'; Akiyama (yellow card) 90+6'	Report	Scholz 38' (pen.)	Stadium: Denka Big Swan Stadium; Attendance: 27,775; Referee: Hajime Matsuo

15 September 27	Urawa Red Diamonds	0–0	Kyoto Sanga	Saitama
19:34 JST	Akimoto (yellow card) 62'	Report	Tawiah (yellow card) 71'	Stadium: Saitama Stadium 2002; Attendance: 21,434; Referee: Hayato Shimizu

22 September 28	Gamba Osaka	1–3	Urawa Red Diamonds	Suita
17:00 JST	Usami 17'	Report	Kanté 29' (red card) 59'; Takahashi 68'; Linssen 85'	Stadium: Panasonic Stadium Suita; Attendance: 30,135; Referee: Yusuke Araki

29 September 29	Urawa Red Diamonds	1–1	Yokohama FC	Saitama
19:30 JST	Scholz 74' (pen.)	Report	Marcelo 15'	Stadium: Saitama Stadium 2002; Attendance: 22,379; Referee: Yoshiro Imamura

20 October 30	Urawa Red Diamonds	2–0	Kashiwa Reysol	Saitama
19:00 JST	Koizumi 53'; Ogiwara 57'	Report		Stadium: Saitama Stadium 2002; Attendance: 25,991; Referee: Yuichi Nishimura

27 October 31	Kashima Antlers	0–0	Urawa Red Diamonds	Kashima
14:00 JST		Report	Takahashi (yellow card) 49'; Sakai (yellow card) 66'; Scholz (yellow card) 67'; Akimoto (yellow card) 88'	Stadium: Kashima Soccer Stadium; Attendance: 29,305; Referee: Hiroyuki Kimura

10 November 32	Urawa Red Diamonds	1–2	Vissel Kobe	Saitama
15:00 JST	Kanté 90+1'	Report	Thuler 62'; Osako 90+6'	Stadium: Saitama Stadium 2002; Attendance: 48,144; Referee: Yusuke Araki

24 November 33	Urawa Red Diamonds	2–3	Avispa Fukuoka	Saitama
14:00 JST	Scholz 18' (pen.); Akimoto 75'	Report	Konno 32', 62'; Oda 54'	Stadium: Saitama Stadium 2002; Attendance: 34,826; Referee: Masuya Ueda

2 December 34	Hokkaido Consadole Sapporo	0–2	Urawa Red Diamonds	Sapporo
18:00 JST	Miyazawa (yellow card) 56'; Arano (yellow card) 90+5'		Scholz (yellow card) 18', (goal) 58' (pen.); Nakajima 72'	Stadium: Sapporo Dome

=== Emperor's Cup ===
As Urawa is a J1 club, it starts the competition at the second round.

7 June Second round	Urawa Red Diamonds	1–0 (a.e.t.)	Kansai University	Saitama
19:00	Ito 105'	Report	Yoshinaga (yellow card) 2'	Stadium: Urawa Komaba Stadium; Attendance: 5,351; Referee: Hiroyoshi Takayama

12 July Third round	Urawa Red Diamonds	1–0	Montedio Yamagata	Tendo
	Ito 64'; Iwanami (yellow card) 77'	Report		Stadium: ND Soft Stadium Yamagata; Attendance: 6,520; Referee: Jumpei Iida

2 August Fourth round	Nagoya Grampus	3–0	Urawa Red Diamonds	Nagoya
	Castro 25'; Junker 75'; Izumi 84'	Report		Stadium: CS Asset Minato Soccer Stadium; Attendance: 6,975; Referee: Takuto Okabe

=== J.League Cup ===
The club started the competition at the group stage.

Pos	Team	Pld	W	D	L	GF	GA	GD	Pts	Qualification
1	Urawa Red Diamonds	6	1	5	0	5	4	+1	8 (Note: Head-to-head points: Urawa Red Diamonds 6, Shimizu S-Pulse 5, Kawasaki Frontale 4.)	Advance to knockout stage
2	Shimizu S-Pulse	6	2	2	2	8	15	−7	8	
3	Kawasaki Frontale	6	2	2	2	12	7	+5	8	
4	Shonan Bellmare	6	1	3	2	8	7	+1	6	

Source: JLeague.co (EN), JLeague.jp (JA)
Rules for classification: Tiebreakers
Notes:

8 March	Shonan Bellmare	0–0	Urawa Red Diamonds	Hiratsuka
19:03		Report	Shibato (yellow card) 10'; Mawatari (yellow card) 90+3'	Stadium: Lemon Gas Stadium Hiratsuka; Attendance: 8,856; Referee: Futoshi Nakamura

26 March	Urawa Red Diamonds	1–1	Shimizu S-Pulse	Saitama
15:00	Linssen 38'	Report	Kololli 71'	Stadium: Saitama Stadium 2002; Attendance: 10,125; Referee: Koei Koya

5 April	Kawasaki Frontale	0–0	Urawa Red Diamonds	Kawasaki
19:03		Report	Schalk (yellow card) 72'	Stadium: Kawasaki Todoroki Stadium; Attendance: 18,332; Referee: Shu Kawamata

19 April	Urawa Red Diamonds	1–1	Shonan Bellmare	Saitama
19:33	Hayakawa 43'; Iwanami (yellow card) 69'	Report	Yamada 3'; Okamoto (yellow card) 48'; Yamamoto (yellow card) 87'	Stadium: Saitama Stadium 2002; Attendance: 11,222; Referee: Hiroki Kasahara

24 May	Urawa Red Diamonds	2–1	Kawasaki Frontale	Saitama
19:33	Kanté 51'; João Schmidt 89' (o.g.)	Report	Segawa 3'; Kozuka (yellow card) 47'; Ienaga (yellow card) 88'	Stadium: Saitama Stadium 2002; Attendance: 12,366; Referee: Yoshimi Yamashita

18 June	Shimizu S-Pulse	1–1	Urawa Red Diamonds	Shizuoka
18:03	Kitagawa 33' (yellow card) 56'	Report	Akimoto 49'	Stadium: IAI Stadium Nihondaira; Attendance: 10,229; Referee: Koichiro Fukushima

=== Quarter-finals ===
6 September First leg	Gamba Osaka	0–1	Urawa Red Diamonds	Suita
19:03 JST		JLeague.co (EN); JLeague.jp (JA)	Schalk 46'	Stadium: Panasonic Stadium Suita; Attendance: 9,363; Referee: Takafumi Mikuriya

10 September Second leg	Urawa Red Diamonds	3–0	Gamba Osaka	Saitama
19:00 JST	Linssen 8', 62'; Schalk 86'	JLeague.co (EN); JLeague.jp (JA)		Stadium: Saitama Stadium 2002
Note: Urawa won 4-0 on aggregate

=== Semi-finals ===
11 October First Leg	Yokohama F. Marinos	1–0	Urawa Red Diamonds	Yokohama
19:00 JST	Lopes 60' (pen.)		Sakai (red card) 90+5'	Stadium: Nissan Stadium; Attendance: 13,337; Referee: Akihiko Ikeuchi

15 October Second Leg	Urawa Red Diamonds	2–0	Yokohama F. Marinos	Saitama
17:00 JST	Scholz 53' (pen.), 90+1' (pen.)			Stadium: Saitama Stadium 2002; Attendance: 29,504; Referee: Ryu Tanimoto
Note: Urawa won 2-1 on aggregate

=== Final ===
3 November	Urawa Red Diamonds	1–2	Avispa Fukuoka	Shinjuku, Tokyo
15:05 JST	Akimoto 67'		Mae 5'; Miya 45+5'	Stadium: Japan National Stadium; Attendance: 61,683

=== 2023–24 AFC Champions League ===
Urawa qualified to the play-off round of the competition because they are the defending champions and would not qualify to the Champions League by their national competitions. This is due to the club not being able to finish in a sufficiently high position in the J1 League and in the Emperor's Cup during the 2022 season.

22 August Play-off round	Urawa Red Diamonds	3–0	(Hong Kong) Lee Man	Saitama
19:30 JST	Koizumi 3'; Koroki 6'; Sekine 90+3'; Akimoto (yellow card) 90+5'		José Ángel (yellow card) 45+5'	Stadium: Saitama Stadium 2002
Note: A win (after 90 minutes, extra-time or penalty shoot-out) qualifies them to the 2023–24 AFC Champions League Group Stage.

Pos	Team	Pld	W	D	L	GF	GA	GD	Pts	Qualification	POH	RED	HAN	WTT
1	(South Korea) Pohang Steelers	6	5	1	0	14	5	+9	16	Advance to round of 16	—	2–1	2–0	3–1
2	(Japan) Urawa Red Diamonds	6	2	1	3	12	9	+3	7		0–2	—	6–0	2–1
3	(Vietnam) Hanoi FC	6	2	0	4	7	16	−9	6		2–4	2–1	—	2–1
4	(China) Wuhan Three Towns	6	1	2	3	8	11	−3	5		1–1	2–2	2–1	—

Source: AFC
Rules for classification: Tiebreakers

=== Group Stage ===
20 September 2023 1	Wuhan Three Towns (China)	2–2	Urawa Red Diamonds	Wuhan, China
21:00 CST	Zhang Xiaobin 10'; Davidson 62' (pen.)	Report	Linssen 55'; Kanté 90+4'	Stadium: Wuhan Sports Center; Attendance: 27,600; Referee: Omar Mohammed Al Ali (United Arab Emirates)

4 October 2023 2	Urawa Red Diamonds	6–0	(Vietnam) Hanoi	Saitama
19:00 JST	Phạm 9' (o.g.); Scholz 19' (pen.); Takahashi 37'; Sekine 65'; Kanté (penalty missed) , 70'; Panya 85'			Stadium: Saitama Stadium 2002; Referee: Adham Mohammed (Jordania)

24 October 2023 3	Urawa Red Diamonds	0–2	(South Korea) Pohang Steelers	Saitama
19:00 JST			Shin (yellow card) 8'; Jeong 22'; Goh 49'; Kim (yellow card) 87'	Stadium: Saitama Stadium 2002; Referee: Ilgiz Tantashev (Uzbekistan)

8 November 2023 4	Pohang Steelers (South Korea)	2–1	Urawa Red Diamonds	Pohang, South Korea
19:00 KST	Zeca 66' (pen.); Park (yellow card) 62'; Kim 90+4'		Kanté 36'; Ito (yellow card) 54'; Iwanami (yellow card) 67'; Akimoto (red card) 72'; Skorża (red card) 72'	Stadium: Pohang Steelyard; Referee: Alireza Faghani (Iran)

28 November 2023 5	Urawa Red Diamonds	2–1	(China) Wuhan Three Towns	Saitama
19:00 JST	Scholz 37' (pen.); Linssen (yellow card) 64'; Høibråten (yellow card) 88'; Kanté 90'		He (yellow card) 44'; Davidson 68'	Stadium: Saitama Stadium 2002; Referee: Majed Al-Shamrani (Saudi Arabia)

12 December 2023 6	Hanoi (Vietnam)	2–1	Urawa Red Diamonds	Hanoi, Vietnam
19:00 ICT	Đào Văn Nam 53'; Phạm Tuấn Hải 87' (pen.)		Scholz (penalty missed); Linssen 65'	Stadium: Mỹ Đình National Stadium; Referee: Sadullo Gulmorodi (Tajikistan)

=== 2022 AFC Champions League ===
The two-legged final was originally scheduled to be played on 19 and 26 February. However, Urawa's main stadium, the Saitama Stadium 2002 was not available due to pitch maintenance around this date, and then, would see Urawa having to host the second leg at the Urawa Komaba Stadium. As a result of this conflict, the AFC decided to rearrange the dates even further on the calendar, rescheduling the matches to late April and early May.

29 April Final (1st Leg)	Al-Hilal (Saudi Arabia)	1–1	(Japan) Urawa Red Diamonds	Riyadh
20:30 UTC+3	Al-Dawsari 13' (red card) 86'	Report	Koroki 53'; Ito (yellow card) 85'; Iwao (yellow card) 86'	Stadium: King Fahd International Stadium; Attendance: 50,881; Referee: Ahmed Al-Kaf (Oman)

6 May Final (2nd Leg)	Urawa Red Diamonds (Japan)	1–0	(Saudi Arabia) Al-Hilal	Saitama
18:00 UTC+9	Okubo (yellow card) 36'; Carrillo 48' (o.g.)	Report	Al-Bulaihi (yellow card) 88'	Stadium: Saitama Stadium 2002; Attendance: 53,574; Referee: Ma Ning (China)
Note: Urawa Red Diamonds won 2–1 on aggregate.

=== FIFA World Club Cup ===
Urawa Red Diamonds qualified for the 2023 FIFA Club World Cup as winners of the 2022 AFC Champions League final. They will play the 2023 CONCACAF Champions League winners, Club León, in the quarterfinals.

15 December Quarter-Finals	(Mexico) Club León	0–1	Urawa Red Diamonds	Jeddah
17:30 UTC+03:00	Viñas (yellow card) 51'; Tesillo (yellow card) 51', (red card) 84'		Okubo (yellow card) 45+1'; Schalk 78'	Stadium: King Abdullah Sports City; Referee: Ndala Ngambo (DR Congo)

19 December Semifinals	Urawa Red Diamonds	0–3	(England) Manchester City	Jeddah
21:00 UTC+03:00			Akanji (yellow card) 24'; Höibraten 45+1' (o.g.); Kovačić 52'; Silva 59'; Nunes (yellow card) 83'	Stadium: King Abdullah Sports City; Referee: Mohammed Khled Hoish (Saudi Arabia)

22 December Match for Third Place	Urawa Red Diamonds	2–4	(Egypt) Al Ahly	Jeddah
17:30 UTC+03:00	Kanté 43', (yellow card) 75'; Scholz 54' (pen.); Linssen (yellow card) 55'		Ibrahim 19'; Tau 25'; Koizumi 60' (o.g.); El Shenawy (yellow card) 90+5'; Maâloul (penalty missed) , 90+8', (yellow card) 90+9'	Stadium: King Abdullah Sports City; Referee: Tori Penso (United States)

== Goalscorers ==
Updated as of 2 July 2023.

Rank	Pos.	No.	Player	J1 League	Emperor's Cup	J.League Cup	2022 ACL Final	2023–24 ACL	Total
1	FW	30	(Japan) Shinzo Koroki	4	0	0	1	0	5
2	FW	11	(Guinea) José Kanté	3	0	1	0	0	4
3	MF	14	(Japan) Takahiro Sekine	3	0	0	0	0	3
3	DF	28	(Denmark) Alexander Scholz	3	0	0	0	0	3
3	MF	3	(Japan) Atsuki Ito	2	1	0	0	0	3
3	DF	15	(Japan) Takahiro Akimoto	2	0	1	0	0	3
7	DF	2	(Japan) Hiroki Sakai	2	0	0	0	0	2
7	MF	25	(Japan) Kaito Yasui	2	0	0	0	0	2
7	FW	9	(Netherlands) Bryan Linssen	1	0	1	0	0	2
10	DF	5	(Norway) Marius Høibråten	1	0	0	0	0	1
10	FW	17	(Netherlands) Alex Schalk	1	0	0	0	0	1
10	FW	19	(Japan) Ken Iwao	1	0	0	0	0	1
10	MF	21	(Japan) Tomoaki Okubo	1	0	0	0	0	1
10	MF	35	(Japan) Jumpei Hayakawa	0	0	1	0	0	1
Total				26	1	4	1	0	32
