= 2022 AFC Champions League final =

- Event: 2022 AFC Champions League
Al-Hilal	Urawa Red Diamonds
1	2

First leg
Al-Hilal	Urawa Red Diamonds
1	1
- Date: 29 April 2023
- Venue: King Fahd International Stadium, Riyadh
- Referee: Ahmed Al-Kaf (Oman)
- Attendance: 50,881
- Weather: Clear; 31 °C (88 °F); 15% humidity

Second leg
Urawa Red Diamonds	Al-Hilal
1	0
- Date: 6 May 2023
- Venue: Saitama Stadium 2002, Saitama
- Referee: Ma Ning (China)
- Attendance: 53,574

The 2022 AFC Champions League final was the final of the 2022 AFC Champions League, the 41st edition of the top-level Asian club football tournament organized by the Asian Football Confederation (AFC), and the 20th edition under the AFC Champions League title.

The final was contested in two-legged home-and-away format between Al-Hilal from Saudi Arabia and Urawa Red Diamonds from Japan. Urawa Red Diamonds won the tie 2–1 on aggregate and clinched their third title. As Asian champions, they qualified for the 2023 FIFA Club World Cup in Saudi Arabia.

The 2022 final was the third time in six years that these two teams met in the AFC Champions League final, after the 2017 final which Urawa Red Diamonds won 2–1 on aggregate and the 2019 final which Al-Hilal won 3–0 on aggregate.

== Teams ==
In the following table, the finals until 2002 were in the Asian Club Championship era, and since 2003 in the AFC Champions League era.

Team	Region (Federation)	Previous finals appearances (bold indicates winners)
(Saudi Arabia) Al-Hilal	West (WAFF)	8 (1986, 1987, **1991**, **2000**, 2014, 2017, **2019**, **2021**)
(Japan) Urawa Red Diamonds	East (EAFF)	3 (**2007**, **2017**, 2019)

Notes

1. The 1986 final was played in a four-team round-robin format, with Al-Hilal finishing as runners-up.
2. Al-Hilal were unable to participate in the 1987 final and were declared runners-up.

== Road to the final ==
Note: In all results below, the score of the finalist is given first.

(Saudi Arabia) Al-Hilal		Round	(Japan) Urawa Red Diamonds	
Opponent	Result	Group stage	Opponent	Result
(United Arab Emirates) Sharjah	2–1	Matchday 1	(Singapore) Lion City Sailors	4–1
(Qatar) Al-Rayyan	3–0	Matchday 2	(China) Shandong Taishan	5–0
(Tajikistan) Istiklol	1–0	Matchday 3	(South Korea) Daegu FC	0–1
(Tajikistan) Istiklol	3–0	Matchday 4	(South Korea) Daegu FC	0–0
(United Arab Emirates) Sharjah	2–2	Matchday 5	(Singapore) Lion City Sailors	6–0
(Qatar) Al-Rayyan	0–2	Matchday 6	(China) Shandong Taishan	5–0
**Group A winner**: Pos / Team / Pld / Pts; **1** / (Saudi Arabia) Al-Hilal (H) / **6** / **13**; 2 / (Qatar) Al-Rayyan / 6 / **13**; 3 / (United Arab Emirates) Sharjah / 6 / **5**; 4 / (Tajikistan) Istiklol / 6 / **3**; Source: AFC (H) Hosts		Final standings	**Group F runners-up**: Pos / Team / Pld / Pts; 1 / (South Korea) Daegu FC / 6 / **13**; **2** / (Japan) Urawa Red Diamonds / **6** / **13**; 3 / (Singapore) Lion City Sailors / 6 / **7**; 4 / (China) Shandong Taishan / 6 / **1**; Source: AFC	
Opponent	Result	Knockout stage	Opponent	Result
(United Arab Emirates) Shabab Al-Ahli	3–1	Round of 16	(Malaysia) Johor Darul Ta'zim	5–0
(Iran) Foolad	1–0	Quarter-finals	(Thailand) BG Pathum United F.C.	4–0
(Qatar) Al-Duhail	7–0	Semi-finals	(South Korea) Jeonbuk Hyundai Motors	2–2 (a.e.t.) (3–1 p)

== Format ==
The final was played over two legs. If the aggregate score would have been tied after two legs, the away goals rule would apply. If still tied, extra time and, if necessary, a penalty shoot-out would have been used to decide the winning team.

== Matches ==
=== First leg ===
==== Details ====
29 April 2023
20:30 UTC+3

Al-Hilal (Saudi Arabia)	1–1	(Japan) Urawa Red Diamonds
S. Al-Dawsari 13'	Report	Koroki 53'

King Fahd International Stadium, Riyadh
Attendance: 50,881
Referee: Ahmed Al-Kaf (Oman)

**Al-Hilal**	**Urawa Red Diamonds**

GK	1	(Saudi Arabia) Abdullah Al-Mayouf
RB	66	(Saudi Arabia) Saud Abdulhamid
CB	20	(South Korea) Jang Hyun-soo
CB	5	(Saudi Arabia) Ali Al-Bulaihi
LB	2	(Saudi Arabia) Mohammed Al-Breik		(substituted off) 83'
CM	28	(Saudi Arabia) Mohamed Kanno		(substituted off) 75'
CM	7	(Saudi Arabia) Salman Al-Faraj (c)
CM	29	(Saudi Arabia) Salem Al-Dawsari	(red card) 86'
RW	17	(Mali) Moussa Marega
LW	96	(Brazil) Michael
CF	9	(Nigeria) Odion Ighalo
Substitutes:
GK	31	(Saudi Arabia) Habib Al-Wotayan
GK	60	(Saudi Arabia) Ahmed Al-Jubaya
DF	4	(Saudi Arabia) Khalifah Al-Dawsari
DF	70	(Saudi Arabia) Mohammed Jahfali
MF	8	(Saudi Arabia) Abdullah Otayf		(substituted on) 75'
MF	16	(Saudi Arabia) Nasser Al-Dawsari
MF	43	(Saudi Arabia) Musab Al-Juwayr
MF	88	(Saudi Arabia) Hamad Al-Yami		(substituted on) 83'
FW	11	(Saudi Arabia) Saleh Al-Shehri
FW	14	(Saudi Arabia) Abdullah Al-Hamdan
Manager:
(Argentina) Ramón Díaz

GK	1	(Japan) Shusaku Nishikawa
RB	2	(Japan) Hiroki Sakai (c)		(substituted off) 81'
CB	28	(Denmark) Alexander Scholz
CB	5	(Norway) Marius Høibråten
LB	15	(Japan) Takahiro Akimoto
CM	3	(Japan) Atsuki Ito	(yellow card) 85'	(substituted off) 85'
CM	19	(Japan) Ken Iwao	(yellow card) 86'
RW	21	(Japan) Tomoaki Okubo		(substituted off) 81'
AM	8	(Japan) Yoshio Koizumi		(substituted off) 67'
LW	14	(Japan) Takahiro Sekine
CF	30	(Japan) Shinzo Koroki		(substituted off) 67'
Substitutes:
GK	12	(Japan) Zion Suzuki
DF	4	(Japan) Takuya Iwanami
DF	6	(Japan) Kazuaki Mawatari
DF	13	(Japan) Tomoya Inukai
DF	77	(Japan) Takuya Ogiwara		(substituted on) 81'
MF	22	(Japan) Kai Shibato		(substituted on) 85'
MF	25	(Japan) Kaito Yasui		(substituted on) 67'
MF	40	(Japan) Yuichi Hirano
MF	46	(Japan) Jumpei Hayakawa		(substituted on) 81'
FW	99	(Guinea) José Kanté		(substituted on) 67'
Manager:
(Poland) Maciej Skorża

Assistant referees:
Abu Bakar Al-Amri (Oman)
Rashid Al-Ghaithi (Oman)
Fourth official:
Adel Al-Naqbi (United Arab Emirates)
Video assistant referee:
Omar Mohamed Al-Ali (United Arab Emirates)
Assistant video assistant referee:
Ahmed Eisa Darwish (United Arab Emirates)

**Match rules**

- 90 minutes
- Ten named substitutes, of which up to five may be used

==== Statistics ====
Overall
Statistic	Al-Hilal	Urawa Red Diamonds
Goals scored	1	1
Total shots	9	2
Shots on target	2	2
Blocked shots	3	1
Ball possession	72%	28%
Corner kicks	5	1
Passes	695	281
Fouls conceded	10	9
Offsides	0	2
Yellow cards	0	2
Red cards	1	0

=== Second leg ===
==== Details ====
6 May 2023
18:00 UTC+9

Urawa Red Diamonds (Japan)	1–0	(Saudi Arabia) Al-Hilal
Carrillo 48' (o.g.)	Report

Saitama Stadium 2002, Saitama
Attendance: 53,574
Referee: Ma Ning (China)

**Urawa Red Diamonds**	**Al-Hilal**

GK	1	(Japan) Shusaku Nishikawa
RB	2	(Japan) Hiroki Sakai (c)
CB	28	(Denmark) Alexander Scholz
CB	5	(Norway) Marius Høibråten
LB	15	(Japan) Takahiro Akimoto
CM	3	(Japan) Atsuki Ito		(substituted off) 86'
CM	19	(Japan) Ken Iwao
RW	21	(Japan) Tomoaki Okubo	(yellow card) 36'
AM	8	(Japan) Yoshio Koizumi		(substituted off) 72'
LW	14	(Japan) Takahiro Sekine		(substituted off) 86'
CF	30	(Japan) Shinzo Koroki		(substituted off) 72'
Substitutes:
GK	12	(Japan) Zion Suzuki
DF	4	(Japan) Takuya Iwanami
DF	13	(Japan) Tomoya Inukai
DF	77	(Japan) Takuya Ogiwara		(substituted on) 86'
MF	22	(Japan) Kai Shibato		(substituted on) 86'
MF	25	(Japan) Kaito Yasui		(substituted on) 72'
MF	40	(Japan) Yuichi Hirano
MF	46	(Japan) Jumpei Hayakawa
FW	18	(Japan) Toshiki Takahashi
FW	99	(Guinea) José Kanté		(substituted on) 72'
Manager:
(Poland) Maciej Skorża

GK	1	(Saudi Arabia) Abdullah Al-Mayouf (c)
RB	66	(Saudi Arabia) Saud Abdulhamid
CB	20	(South Korea) Jang Hyun-soo
CB	5	(Saudi Arabia) Ali Al-Bulaihi	(yellow card) 88'
LB	2	(Saudi Arabia) Mohammed Al-Breik		(substituted off) 80'
CM	19	(Peru) André Carrillo
CM	8	(Saudi Arabia) Abdullah Otayf		(substituted off) 68'
CM	28	(Saudi Arabia) Mohamed Kanno		(substituted off) 87'
RW	96	(Brazil) Michael
LW	14	(Saudi Arabia) Abdullah Al-Hamdan		(substituted off) 68'
CF	9	(Nigeria) Odion Ighalo
Substitutes:
GK	21	(Saudi Arabia) Mohammed Al-Owais
GK	31	(Saudi Arabia) Habib Al-Wotayan
DF	4	(Saudi Arabia) Khalifah Al-Dawsari
DF	70	(Saudi Arabia) Mohammed Jahfali
MF	16	(Saudi Arabia) Nasser Al-Dawsari		(substituted on) 68'
MF	43	(Saudi Arabia) Musab Al-Juwayr		(substituted on) 87'
MF	88	(Saudi Arabia) Hamad Al-Yami		(substituted on) 80'
FW	11	(Saudi Arabia) Saleh Al-Shehri		(substituted on) 68'
Manager:
(Argentina) Ramón Díaz

Assistant referees:
Zhou Fei (China)
Zhang Cheng (China)
Fourth official:
Kim Jong-hyeok (South Korea)
Fifth official:
Shi Xiang (China)
Video assistant referee:
Fu Ming (China)
Assistant video assistant referee:
Muhammad Taqi (Singapore)

**Match rules**

- 90 minutes
- 30 minutes of extra time if tied on aggregate and away goals
- Penalty shoot-out if still tied after extra time (no away goals rule applied)
- Ten named substitutes, of which up to five may be used, with a sixth allowed in extra time.

==== Statistics ====
Overall
Statistic	Urawa Red Diamonds	Al-Hilal
Goals scored	1	0
Total shots	6	10
Shots on target	0	4
Blocked shots	2	4
Ball possession	29%	71%
Corner kicks	4	8
Passes	254	593
Fouls conceded	10	9
Offsides	1	0
Yellow cards	1	1
Red cards	0	0
