= Junpei Hayakawa =

Japanese footballer (born 2005)

Junpei Hayakawa 早川 隼平
Personal information
- Full name: Junpei Hayakawa
- Date of birth: 5 December 2005 (age 20)
- Place of birth: Saitama, Japan
- Height: 1.63 m (5 ft 4 in)
- Position: Winger

Team information
- Current team: Urawa Red Diamonds
- Number: 39

Youth career
- 2012–2017: 1.FC Kawagoe Aquatic Park
- 2020–2023: Urawa Red Diamonds

Senior career*
Years	Team	Apps	(Gls)
2023–	Urawa Red Diamonds	27	(1)
2024	→ Fagiano Okayama (loan)	15	(2)

International career^{‡}
2021	Japan U16	?	(?)
2022	Japan U17	2	(2)
2022	Japan U18	2	(2)
2023–	Japan U19	3	(0)
- * Club domestic league appearances and goals as of 10 August 2026 ‡ National team caps and goals as of 23:00, 13 June 2023 (UTC)

Junpei Hayakawa (早川 隼平, Hayakawa Junpei; born 5 December 2005) is a Japanese professional footballer who plays as a winger for J1 League club Urawa Red Diamonds.

== Club career ==
=== Urawa Red Diamonds ===
Born in Saitama, Hayakawa first joined Urawa Red Diamonds' youth sector in 2020. Having come through the youth ranks, he was registered to Urawa's senior squad as a home-grown player in February 2022.

At the start of the 2023 season, Hayakawa officially signed a first-team contract with the club; on 5 April, at the age of 17 years and four months, he made his professional debut, coming on as a substitute for Kai Matsuzaki in the 76th minute of a goalless J.League Cup draw against Kawasaki Frontale. On 19 April, he started and scored his first professional goal in a 1–1 league cup draw against Shonan Bellmare: at 17 years and 134 days, he became Urawa's youngest goalscorer in any J.League-hosted competition. Finally, on 23 April, he made his league debut as a substitute for Takahiro Sekine in the 80th minute of a 1–1 draw against Kawasaki Frontale.

On 30 April 2023, Hayakawa made his AFC Champions League debut, coming on as a substitute for Tomoaki Okubo in the 81st minute of the first leg of the 2022 ACL final against Al Hilal, which ended in a 1–1 draw. He was an unused substitute in the second leg, which saw Urawa gain a 1–0 victory and lift the third continental title in their history.

=== Loan to Fagiano Okayama ===
On 7 May 2024, Hayakawa moved on loan to J2 League club Fagiano Okayama for the remainder of the 2024 season. He made his debut for the club on 12 May, coming on as a second-half substitute in a goalless league draw with V-Varen Nagasaki. He then scored his first goal on 26 May, in a 4–1 away league victory over Vegalta Sendai.

== International career ==
Hayakawa has represented Japan at various youth international levels, having played for the under-16, under-17, under-18 and under-19 national teams.

In May 2023, he was included in the Japanese squad that took part in the Maurice Revello Tournament in France, where the Samurai Blue finished tenth, after losing to the U-21 Mediterranean Team in the final play-off.

== Career statistics ==
=== Club ===
As of 26 May 2024

Appearances and goals by club, season and competition
Club	Season	League	League		National cup (Note: Appearances in the Emperor's Cup.)		League cup (Note: Appearances in the J. League Cup.)		Continental (Note: Appearances in the AFC Champions League.)		Other		Total	
Club	Season	League	Apps	Goals	Apps	Goals	Apps	Goals	Apps	Goals	Apps	Goals	Apps	Goals
Urawa Red Diamonds	2022	J1 League	0	0	0	0	0	0	0	0	–		0	0
Urawa Red Diamonds	2023	J1 League	11	0	1	0	8	1	2	0	–		22	1
Urawa Red Diamonds	2024	J1 League	0	0	0	0	0	0	–		–		0	0
Urawa Red Diamonds	Total		11	0	1	0	8	1	2	0	0	0	22	1
Fagiano Okayama (loan)	2024	J2 League	3	1	0	0	0	0	–		–		3	1
Career total			14	1	1	0	8	1	2	0	0	0	25	2

== Honours ==
=== Club ===
Urawa Red Diamonds

- AFC Champions League: 2022
