= N High School =

Private correspondence high school in Japan

- N高等学校

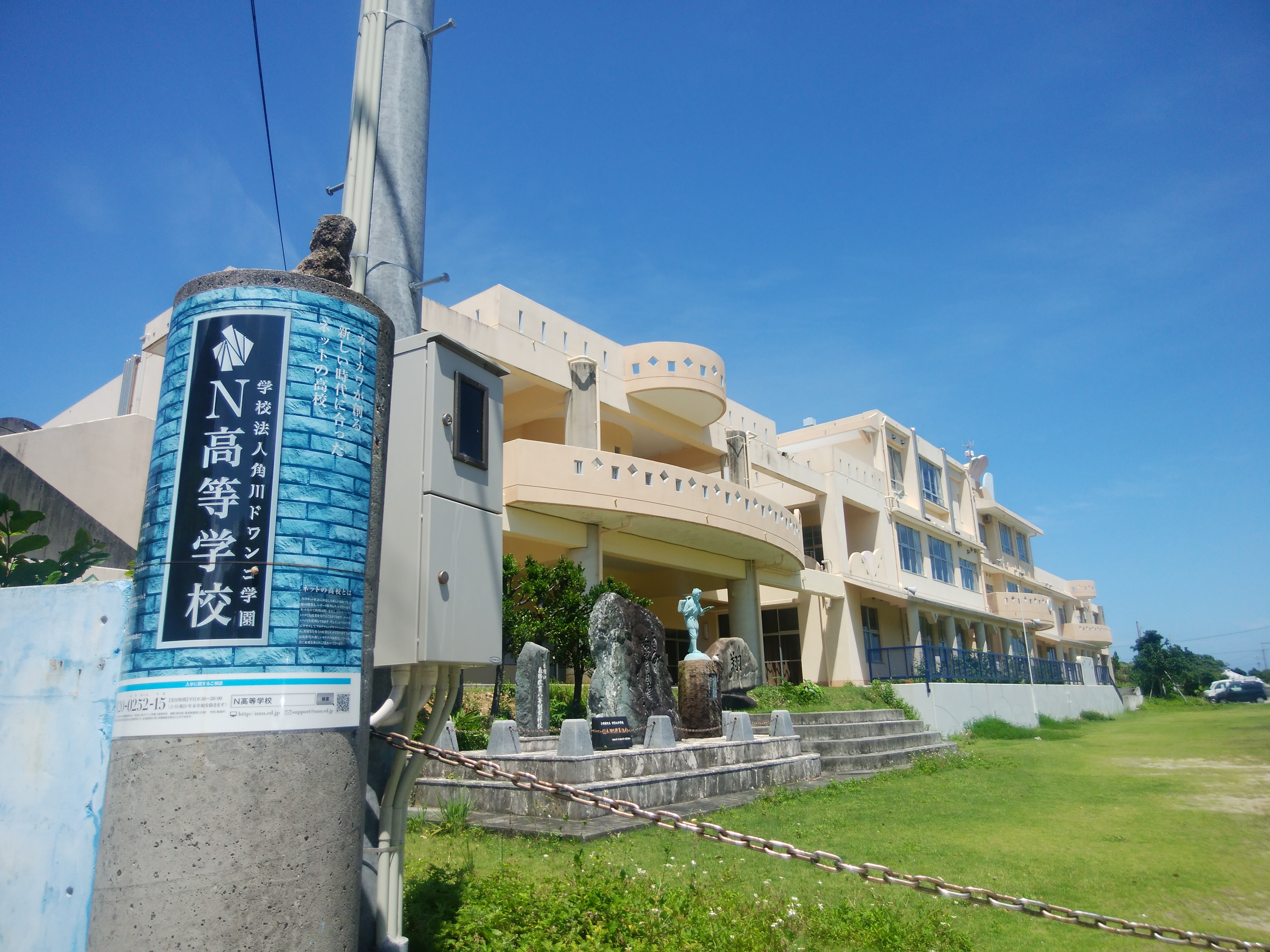

Location
- 224 Yonashiroikei, Uruma, Okinawa 904-2421; Japan; 26°23′10.5″N 127°59′39.6″E

Information
- Type: Private, distance education
- Established: 2016
- School code: D147321300012
- Gender: Mixed
- Language: Japanese
- Website: nnn.ed.jp

N High School (Japanese: N高等学校, Hepburn: Enu Kōtō Gakkō) is a Japanese private distance learning high school located in Uruma, Okinawa Prefecture, Japan, with campuses across the country.

It was established by the Kadokawa Dwango Educational Institute in April 2016. Being an online school with the ability to grant high school diplomas, it offers distance education courses with flexibility in time and location to students within Japan and abroad. In January 2023, with nearly 17,000 students, it was the largest high school in Japan.

== Notable alumni and students ==
- Asami Ueno, Go player
- Ayaka Ōshima, shogi player
- Yuria Katō, shogi player
- Tomoe Kawabata, figure skater
- Rika Kihira, figure skater
- Kensuke "KenKen" Kaneko, Rize bassist
- Ikumi Shimizu, 30th International Olympiad in Informatics bronze medalist
- Zion Suzuki, football player
- Shintaro Mochizuki, tennis player
- Utana Yoshida, ice dancer
