= Zion Suzuki =

Japan international footballer (born 2002)

Zion Suzuki 鈴木 彩艶
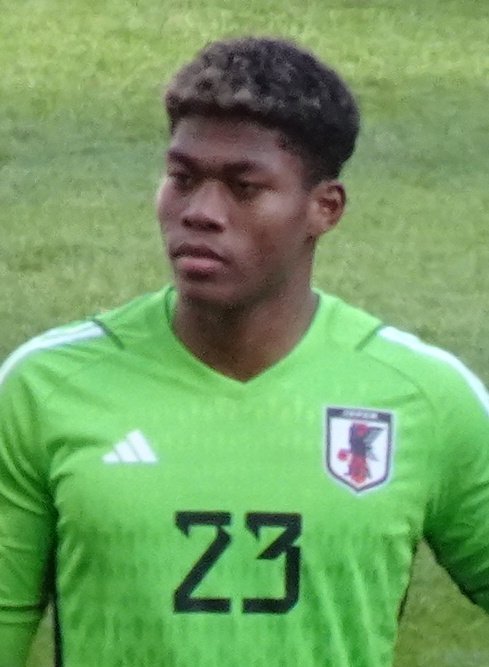
- Suzuki with Japan in 2024

Personal information
- Full name: Zion Suzuki
- Date of birth: 21 August 2002 (age 24)
- Place of birth: Newark, New Jersey, U.S.
- Height: 1.90 m (6 ft 3 in)
- Position: Goalkeeper

Team information
- Current team: Aston Villa
- Number: 1

Youth career
- 2009–2020: Urawa Red Diamonds

Senior career*
Years	Team	Apps	(Gls)
2021–2024	Urawa Red Diamonds	8	(0)
2023–2024	→ Sint-Truiden (loan)	32	(0)
2024–2026	Parma	57	(0)
2026–	Aston Villa	10	(0)

International career^{‡}
2016–2017	Japan U15	7	(0)
2017	Japan U16	2	(0)
2017–2019	Japan U17	9	(0)
2018	Japan U18	1	(0)
2021	Japan Olympic	1	(0)
2022–	Japan	32	(0)
Medal record
Men's football
Representing Japan
EAFF Championship
Winner	2022 Japan	Team
- * Club domestic league appearances and goals as of 21:09, 21 November 2026 (UTC) ‡ National team caps and goals as of 14 November 2026 (UTC)

Zion Suzuki (鈴木 彩艶, Suzuki Zaion; born 21 August 2002) is a professional footballer who plays as a goalkeeper for Premier League club Aston Villa. Born in the United States, he represents the Japan national team.

Suzuki began his professional career with Japanese club Urawa Red Diamonds, signing his first professional contract at the age of 16 years, becoming the youngest player in the club's history to do so. He made his senior debut on 2 March 2021 in a J.League Cup match against Shonan Bellmare, and was part of the team that won the 2022 AFC Champions League and the 2022 Japanese Super Cup. After a loan at Sint-Truiden, Suzuki joined Serie A club Parma in 2024, where he played for two years before joining Premier League club Aston Villa in 2026.

Suzuki has represented Japan at multiple youth levels and at senior level, playing for the country in the 2026 FIFA World Cup.

== Early and personal life ==
Suzuki was born in Newark, New Jersey, United States, to a Ghanaian father and a Japanese mother. He was named after the biblical location of Mount Zion in Jerusalem. His family moved to Japan while he was young and settled in Urawa, Saitama, where he grew up.

Suzuki took up football in kindergarten, following his older brother into the sport, and played as a goalkeeper from his years at elementary school. He joined the academy of his local club, Urawa Red Diamonds, as an elementary school student and came up through its junior, junior youth, and youth teams. He attended N High School, a correspondence school, while in the youth team.

Suzuki is a keen golfer, though he does not watch the sport, and outside of sport he enjoys the music of rapper AK-69.

== Club career ==
=== Urawa Red Diamonds ===
Suzuki's professional career began with Japanese club Urawa Red Diamonds when he was 16 years and five months old, making him the youngest player in the history of the club to sign a professional contract. Suzuki made his debut for the club on 2 March 2021 in the J.League Cup match against Shonan Bellmare where he kept a clean sheet. His first appearance in the J1 League came on 9 May 2021 in a match against Vegalta Sendai where he kept a clean sheet in a 2–0 win. He would then go on to play in the next five consecutive league matches with main choice goalkeeper Shusaku Nishikawa dropped due to poor performances. He recorded four clean sheets in six matches for Urawa Reds. Suzuki won the New Hero Award of the 2021 J.League Cup in his first season at the club.

Suzuki made his 2022 AFC Champions League debut against Singaporean club Lion City Sailors on 15 April 2022; however, he made a costly error after receiving a back pass from David Moberg Karlsson which resulted in an own goal. In the next match against Chinese side Shandong Taishan, he kept a clean sheet in a 5–0 win. Suzuki played in the club four group stage fixtures before being dropped in favour of the first choice goalkeeper, Shusaku Nishikawa, in the run all the way to the 2022 AFC Champions League final. Suzuki helped the club to win the 2022 AFC Champions League trophy and the 2022 Japanese Super Cup.

=== Sint-Truiden ===
In August 2023, Manchester United had agreed a fee with Urawa Red Diamonds for Suzuki, but he turned the club down in favour of joining Belgian Pro League side Sint-Truiden on loan. He served as the understudy for fellow Japanese goalkeeper Daniel Schmidt before eventually becoming their starting goalkeeper.

On 1 February 2024, it was announced that Suzuki's loan with Sint-Truiden would be converted into a permanent transfer for the next season on 1 July 2024.

=== Parma ===
On 15 July 2024, Serie A club Parma announced the signing of Suzuki to a five-year contract. He became the second Japanese national team player to represent the club after Hidetoshi Nakata, who joined the club in 2001. He made his league debut against Fiorentina on 17 August, which ended in a 1–1 draw.

On 12 August 2026, Suzuki was reported to move to Paris Saint-Germain for a fee of around €35 million. However, days later, the move had collapsed over reported issues over agent fees and playing time.

=== Aston Villa ===
On 19 August 2026, Suzuki signed for Premier League club Aston Villa for an undisclosed fee, reported to be an initial €30 million, which could rise to €35 million with bonuses. On 31 August, Suzuki made his debut for Villa in a 1–0 home loss to Arsenal and became the first Japanese goalkeeper to play in the UEFA Champions League on 8 September in a 3–2 away win against Club Brugge.

== International career ==
Suzuki has represented Japan at multiple levels in youth football. On 19 July 2022, he earned his first cap with Japan's national team, playing the full match against Hong Kong in the 2022 EAFF E-1 Football Championship, which his side won 6–0.

He played in Japan's opening match of the 2023 AFC Asian Cup, a 4–2 win against Vietnam. He also played in their following 1–2 defeat to Iraq, logging one save.

On 15 May 2026, Suzuki was selected in the 26-man squad for the 2026 FIFA World Cup.

== Style of play ==
A tall and physically imposing player at 1.90m, Suzuki's former goalkeeping coach at Sint-Truiden, Dennis Rudel, described him to Sky Sports in 2025 as "just made of muscles". Suzuki has been praised frequently for his distribution from goal, frequently making accurate long passes from goal kicks. An August 2026 article in the Guardian noted that in the 2025–26 Serie A season, Suzuki was ranked second in the league for caught crosses, high interceptions and successful long passes, with more high claims across Europe's big five leagues than any goalkeeper barring Joan García of FC Barcelona.

== Career statistics ==
=== Club ===
As of match played 21 November 2026

Appearances and goals by club, season and competition
Club	Season	League			National cup (Note: Includes Emperor's Cup, Coppa Italia, FA Cup)		League cup (Note: Includes J.League Cup, EFL Cup)		Continental		Other		Total	
Club	Season	Division	Apps	Goals	Apps	Goals	Apps	Goals	Apps	Goals	Apps	Goals	Apps	Goals
Urawa Red Diamonds	2021	J1 League	6	0	0	0	9	0	—		—		15	0
Urawa Red Diamonds	2022	J1 League	2	0	0	0	2	0	4 (Note: Appearances in AFC Champions League)	0	0	0	8	0
Urawa Red Diamonds	2023	J1 League	0	0	1	0	5	0	—		—		6	0
Urawa Red Diamonds	Total		8	0	1	0	16	0	4	0	0	0	29	0
Sint-Truiden (loan)	2023–24	Belgian Pro League	32	0	0	0	—		—		—		32	0
Parma	2024–25	Serie A	37	0	0	0	—		—		—		37	0
Parma	2025–26	Serie A	20	0	2	0	—		—		—		22	0
Parma	Total		57	0	2	0	—		—		—		59	0
Aston Villa	2026–27	Premier League	10	0	0	0	1	0	4 (Note: Appearance in UEFA Champions League)	0	—		15	0
Career total			107	0	3	0	17	0	8	0	0	0	135	0

=== International ===
As of match played 14 November 2026

Appearances and goals by national team and year
National team	Year	Apps	Goals
Japan	2022	1	0
Japan	2023	2	0
Japan	2024	13	0
Japan	2025	5	0
Japan	2026	11	0
Total		32	0

== Honours ==
Urawa Red Diamonds

- AFC Champions League: 2022
- Emperor's Cup: 2021
- Japanese Super Cup: 2022

Japan

- EAFF E-1 Football Championship: 2022

Individual

- Japan Pro-Footballers Association Best XI: 2023, 2024, 2025
- IFFHS Asian Men's Team of the Year: 2024, 2025
