= Hirokazu Ishihara =

Japanese footballer (born 1999)

Personal information
- Full name: Hirokazu Ishihara
- Date of birth: 26 February 1999 (age 27)
- Place of birth: Fujisawa, Kanagawa, Japan
- Height: 1.69 m (5 ft 6 1/2 in)
- Position: Right back

Team information
- Current team: FC Tokyo
- Number: 22

Youth career
- 2005–2006: Fujisawa FC
- 2007–2016: Shonan Bellmare

Senior career*
Years	Team	Apps	(Gls)
2016–2023	Shonan Bellmare	139	(0)
2019	→ Avispa Fukuoka (loan)	37	(0)
2024–2026	Urawa Red Diamonds	73	(2)
2026–	FC Tokyo	8	(0)

International career
2016	Japan U17	1	(0)
2018	Japan U19	3	(0)
Medal record
Shonan Bellmare
Winner	J.League Cup	2018
Representing Japan
AFC U-19 Championship
Bronze medal – third place	2018 Indonesia
- * Club domestic league appearances and goals as of 16:21, 8 October 2026 (UTC)

Hirokazu Ishihara (石原 広教, Ishihara Hirokazu; born 26 February 1999) is a Japanese professional footballer who plays as right back for J1 League club FC Tokyo.

== Career ==
Hirokazu Ishihara joined J1 League club Shonan Bellmare in 2016. On 5 June, he debuted in J.League Cup (v Vissel Kobe).

After three seasons with Shonan and only a handful of appearances, Ishihara joined J2 League club Avispa Fukuoka for the 2019 season. He became a regular starter for the club and made 37 league appearances throughout the season.

He returned to Shonan Bellmare from the 2020 season and became a regular player for the team. At the end of the 2023 season, he had made 168 appearances for the club. He had also made over 200 career appearances without scoring a professional goal.

In December 2023, it was announced that Ishihara would be joining Urawa Red Diamonds for the 2024 season. Ishihara made 79 appearances across all competitions for the club, scoring the first goal of his career in the 2024 season.

In June 2026, Ishihara joined fellow J1 League club FC Tokyo.

== Club statistics ==
As of 8 October 2026.

Appearances and goals by club, season and competition
Club	Season	League			National cup (Note: Includes Emperor's Cup)		League cup (Note: Includes J.League Cup)		Other		Total	
Club	Season	Division	Apps	Goals	Apps	Goals	Apps	Goals	Apps	Goals	Apps	Goals
Shonan Bellmare	2016	–			1	0	1	0	–		2	0
Shonan Bellmare	2017	J2 League	10	0	2	0	0	0	–		12	0
Shonan Bellmare	2018	J1 League	7	0	2	0	9	0	–		18	0
Shonan Bellmare	2020	J1 League	29	0	0	0	2	0	–		31	0
Shonan Bellmare	2021	J1 League	37	0	1	0	1	0	–		39	0
Shonan Bellmare	2022	J1 League	30	0	0	0	7	0	–		37	0
Shonan Bellmare	2023	J1 League	26	0	1	0	2	0	–		29	0
Shonan Bellmare	Total		139	0	7	0	22	0	0	0	168	0
Avispa Fukuoka (loan)	2019	J2 League	37	0	2	0	–		–		39	0
Urawa Red Diamonds	2024	J1 League	30	1	0	0	1	0	0	0	31	1
Urawa Red Diamonds	2025	J1 League	30	1	1	0	2	0	2 (Note: Appearance in FIFA Club World Cup)	0	35	1
Urawa Red Diamonds	2026	J1 (100)	13	0	–		–		0	0	13	0
Urawa Red Diamonds	Total		73	2	1	0	3	0	2	0	79	2
FC Tokyo	2026–27	J1 League	8	0	1	0	1	0	–		10	0
Career total			257	2	11	0	26	0	2	0	296	2
