= Rikito Inoue =

Japanese footballer

Rikito Inoue 井上 黎生人
Personal information
- Full name: Rikito Inoue
- Date of birth: 9 March 1997 (age 29)
- Place of birth: Shimane, Japan
- Height: 1.80 m (5 ft 11 in)
- Position: Defender

Team information
- Current team: Cerezo Osaka
- Number: 4

Youth career
- 2012–2014: Kagoshima Jitsugyo High School

Senior career*
Years	Team	Apps	(Gls)
2015–2021	Gainare Tottori	120	(7)
2021	Fagiano Okayama	42	(0)
2022–2023	Kyoto Sanga	56	(1)
2024–2025	Urawa Red Diamonds	18	(0)
2025–	Cerezo Osaka	28	(2)
- * Club domestic league appearances and goals as of 10 August 2026

Rikito Inoue (井上 黎生人, Inoue, Rikito; born 9 March 1997) is a Japanese professional footballer who plays as a defender for J1 League club Cerezo Osaka.

== Career ==
Inoue made his debut for Kyoto against Cerezo Osaka on the 26 February 2022.

In December 2023, Inoue moved to Urawa Red Diamonds ahead of the 2024 J1 League season.

== Club statistics ==
=== Club ===
As of 24 April 2024

Appearances and goals by club, season and competition
Club	Season	League			National Cup		League Cup		Other		Total	
Club	Season	Division	Apps	Goals	Apps	Goals	Apps	Goals	Apps	Goals	Apps	Goals
Japan			League		Emperor's Cup		J. League Cup		Other		Total	
Gainare Tottori	2015	J3 League	8	0	0	0	–		–		8	0
Gainare Tottori	2016	J3 League	0	0	0	0	–		–		0	0
Gainare Tottori	2017	J3 League	14	1	0	0	–		–		14	1
Gainare Tottori	2018	J3 League	30	2	2	0	–		–		32	2
Gainare Tottori	2019	J3 League	34	1	1	0	–		–		35	1
Gainare Tottori	2020	J3 League	34	3	0	0	–		–		34	3
Gainare Tottori	Total		120	7	3	0	0	0	0	0	123	7
Fagiano Okayama	2021	J2 League	42	0	2	0	–		–		44	0
Kyoto Sanga	2022	J1 League	28	1	5	0	6	0	1 (Note: Appearance in J1/J2 play-offs)	0	40	1
Kyoto Sanga	2023	J1 League	28	0	0	0	3	0	–		31	0
Kyoto Sanga	Total		56	1	5	0	9	0	1	0	71	1
Urawa Reds	2024	J1 League	0	0	0	0	0	0	0	0	0	0
Career total			218	8	10	0	9	0	1	0	238	8
