= Marius Høibråten =

Norwegian footballer (born 1995)

Personal information
- Full name: Marius Christopher Høibråten
- Date of birth: 23 January 1995 (age 31)
- Place of birth: Oslo, Norway
- Height: 1.84 m (6 ft 0 in)
- Positions: Centre-back; left-back

Team information
- Current team: Al-Nasr
- Number: 22

Youth career
- Fet
- 2009–2010: Lillestrøm

Senior career*
| Years | Team | Apps | (Gls) |
| 2011–2013 | Lillestrøm | 11 | (0) |
| 2012 | → Strømmen (loan) | 9 | (1) |
| 2014–2018 | Strømsgodset | 82 | (1) |
| 2018–2020 | Sandefjord | 39 | (3) |
| 2020–2022 | Bodø/Glimt | 80 | (3) |
| 2023–2025 | Urawa Red Diamonds | 104 | (4) |
| 2026– | Al-Nasr | 2 | (0) |

International career
| 2011–2012 | Norway U17 | 15 | (0) |
| 2013–2014 | Norway U19 | 11 | (0) |
| 2014–2016 | Norway U21 | 7 | (0) |
- * Club domestic league appearances and goals as of 22 August 2026

Marius Høibråten (born 23 January 1995) is a Norwegian professional footballer who plays as a centre-back or a left-back for UAE Pro League club Al-Nasr.

== Club career ==
Høibråten played for Fet IL in his early career, and joined Lillestrøm's youth section in 2009. On 1 May 2011 he made his senior debut in the 2011 Norwegian Football Cup. He made his debut in the Norwegian Premier League later that season.

In the latter half of the 2012 season he was loaned to Strømmen IF in the 1. Divisjon. In 2013, he returned to Lillestrøm, becoming more regular. However, on 23 August 2013, he signed a deal with Strømsgodset from 2014, leaving on Bosman. He made his debut for Strømsgodset on 30 March 2014 in the first league match of the season, and was a regular for the rest of the season.

In August 2018 Høibråten signed with Sandefjord on a two-year contract.

On 27 May 2020, he signed for Bodø/Glimt on a three-year contract. He proceeded to win two consecutive Eliteserien titles with the club, both in 2020 and 2021.

On 17 January 2023, Høibråten joined Japanese side Urawa Red Diamonds on a permanent deal. The club is a former club for his former teammate on Bodø/Glimt, Kasper Junker.

== Career statistics ==
As of match played 21 August 2026

Appearances and goals by club, season and competition
| Club | Season | League | | | National cup (Note: Includes Norwegian Football Cup, Emperor's Cup) | | League cup (Note: Includes J.League Cup) | | Continental | | Other | | Total | |
| Club | Season | Division | Apps | Goals | Apps | Goals | Apps | Goals | Apps | Goals | Apps | Goals | Apps | Goals |
|---|---|---|---|---|---|---|---|---|---|---|---|---|---|---|
| Lillestrøm | 2011 | Tippeligaen | 1 | 0 | 1 | 0 | – | | – | | – | | 2 | 0 |
| Lillestrøm | 2012 | Tippeligaen | 0 | 0 | 0 | 0 | – | | – | | – | | 0 | 0 |
| Lillestrøm | 2013 | Tippeligaen | 10 | 0 | 2 | 0 | – | | – | | – | | 12 | 0 |
| Lillestrøm | Total | | 11 | 0 | 3 | 0 | – | | – | | – | | 14 | 0 |
| Strømmen (loan) | 2012 | Norwegian First Division | 9 | 1 | 0 | 0 | – | | – | | – | | 9 | 1 |
| Strømsgodset | 2014 | Tippeligaen | 16 | 1 | 3 | 0 | – | | 2 | 0 | – | | 21 | 1 |
| Strømsgodset | 2015 | Tippeligaen | 15 | 0 | 3 | 0 | – | | 3 | 0 | – | | 21 | 0 |
| Strømsgodset | 2016 | Tippeligaen | 16 | 0 | 5 | 0 | – | | – | | – | | 21 | 0 |
| Strømsgodset | 2017 | Eliteserien | 22 | 0 | 1 | 0 | – | | – | | – | | 23 | 0 |
| Strømsgodset | 2018 | Eliteserien | 13 | 0 | 0 | 0 | – | | – | | – | | 13 | 0 |
| Strømsgodset | Total | | 82 | 1 | 12 | 0 | – | | 6 | 0 | – | | 100 | 1 |
| Sandefjord | 2018 | Eliteserien | 12 | 0 | 0 | 0 | – | | – | | – | | 12 | 0 |
| Sandefjord | 2019 | Norwegian First Division | 27 | 3 | 2 | 0 | – | | – | | – | | 29 | 3 |
| Sandefjord | Total | | 39 | 3 | 2 | 0 | – | | – | | – | | 41 | 3 |
| Bodø/Glimt | 2020 | Eliteserien | 29 | 1 | 0 | 0 | – | | 2 (Note: Appearances in UEFA Europa League) | 0 | – | | 31 | 1 |
| Bodø/Glimt | 2021 | Eliteserien | 23 | 1 | 3 | 0 | – | | 17 (Note: Two appearances in UEFA Champions League, fifteen appearances in UEFA Europa Conference League) | 0 | – | | 43 | 1 |
| Bodø/Glimt | 2022 | Eliteserien | 28 | 1 | 7 | 0 | – | | 14 (Note: Eight appearances and one goal in UEFA Champions League, six appearances in UEFA Europa League) | 1 | – | | 49 | 2 |
| Bodø/Glimt | Total | | 80 | 3 | 10 | 0 | – | | 33 | 1 | – | | 123 | 3 |
| Urawa Red Diamonds | 2022 | J1 League | – | | – | | – | | 2 (Note: Appearances in AFC Champions League) | 0 | – | | 2 | 0 |
| Urawa Red Diamonds | 2023 | J1 League | 33 | 1 | 3 | 0 | 7 | 0 | 6 | 0 | 3 (Note: Appearances in FIFA Club World Cup) | 0 | 52 | 1 |
| Urawa Red Diamonds | 2024 | J1 League | 36 | 1 | 0 | 0 | 2 | 0 | – | | – | | 38 | 1 |
| Urawa Red Diamonds | 2025 | J1 League | 35 | 2 | 2 | 0 | 2 | 0 | – | | 3 (Note: Appearances in FIFA Club World Cup) | 0 | 21 | 1 |
| Urawa Red Diamonds | Total | | 104 | 4 | 5 | 0 | 11 | 0 | 8 | 0 | 6 | 0 | 134 | 4 |
| Al-Nasr | 2025–26 | UAE Pro League | 12 | 0 | 0 | 0 | 0 | 0 | 0 | 0 | 0 | 0 | 12 | 0 |
| Al-Nasr | 2026–27 | UAE Pro League | 2 | 0 | 0 | 0 | 0 | 0 | 0 | 0 | 0 | 0 | 2 | 0 |
| Al-Nasr | Total | | 14 | 0 | 0 | 0 | 0 | 0 | 0 | 0 | 0 | 0 | 0 | 0 |
| Career total | | | 338 | 12 | 32 | 0 | 11 | 0 | 47 | 1 | 6 | 0 | 435 | 13 |

== Honours ==
Bodø/Glimt

- Eliteserien: 2020, 2021

Urawa Red Diamonds

- AFC Champions League: 2022

Individual

- J.League Best XI: 2023
