= Toshiki Takahashi (footballer) =

Japanese footballer (born 1998)

Toshiki Takahashi 高橋 利樹
Personal information
- Full name: Toshiki Takahashi
- Date of birth: 20 January 1998 (age 28)
- Place of birth: Saitama, Japan
- Height: 1.82 m (6 ft 0 in)
- Position: Forward

Team information
- Current team: Sagan Tosu
- Number: 9

Youth career
- Omiya Minami Wings
- –2012: Han FC
- 2013–2015: Saitama Sakae High School

College career
Years	Team	Apps	(Gls)
2016–2019	Kokushikan University		

Senior career*
Years	Team	Apps	(Gls)
2020–2022	Roasso Kumamoto	95	(31)
2023–2025	Urawa Red Diamonds	15	(1)
2024	→ Yokohama FC (loan)	31	(4)
2025–2026	Shimizu S-Pulse	29	(4)
2026–	Sagan Tosu	1	(1)
- * Club domestic league appearances and goals as of 14 August 2026

Toshiki Takahashi (高橋 利樹, Takahashi Toshiki; born 20 January 1998) is a Japanese footballer currently playing as a forward for J2 League club Sagan Tosu.

== Career statistics ==
=== Club ===
As of 10 September 2025.

Appearances and goals by club, season and competition
Club	Season	League			Cup		League Cup		Other		Total	
Club	Season	Division	Apps	Goals	Apps	Goals	Apps	Goals	Apps	Goals	Apps	Goals
Japan			League		Emperor's Cup		J. League Cup		Other		Total	
Kokushikan University	2017	–			1	1	–		–		1	1
Roasso Kumamoto	2020	J3 League	32	9	0	0	–		–		32	9
Roasso Kumamoto	2021	J3 League	23	8	2	0	–		–		25	8
Roasso Kumamoto	2022	J2 League	40	14	2	1	–		3 (Note: Appearances in J1/J2 play-offs)	0	45	15
Roasso Kumamoto	Total		95	31	4	1	0	0	3	0	102	32
Urawa Red Diamonds	2023	J1 League	11	1	2	0	8	0	5 (Note: Appearances in the AFC Champions League)	1	26	2
Urawa Red Diamonds	2024	J1 League	1	0	0	0	0	0	–		1	0
Urawa Red Diamonds	2025	J1 League	3	0	0	0	0	0	–		3	0
Urawa Red Diamonds	Total		15	1	2	0	8	0	5	1	30	2
Yokohama FC (loan)	2024	J2 League	31	4	2	1	1	0	–		34	5
Shimizu S-Pulse	2025	J1 League	4	1	1	0	0	0	–		5	1
Career total			145	37	10	3	9	0	8	1	171	40

== Honours ==
=== Club ===
Urawa Red Diamonds

- AFC Champions League: 2022

=== Individual ===
- J2 League Best XI: 2022
