= Shun Yoshida =

Japanese footballer (born 1996)

Shun Yoshida 吉田 舜
Personal information
- Full name: Shun Yoshida
- Date of birth: 28 November 1996 (age 29)
- Place of birth: Saitama, Japan
- Height: 1.85 m (6 ft 1 in)
- Position: Goalkeeper

Team information
- Current team: Fujieda MYFC
- Number: 24

Youth career
- Konan Minami SSS
- Kumagaya SC
- 2012–2014: Maebashi Ikuei High School

College career
Years	Team	Apps	(Gls)
2015–2018	Hosei University		

Senior career*
Years	Team	Apps	(Gls)
2017	SC Sagamihara	0	(0)
2019	Thespakusatsu Gunma	34	(0)
2020–2022	Oita Trinita	11	(0)
2023–2026	Urawa Red Diamonds	0	(0)
2025	→ Shonan Bellmare (loan)	2	(0)
2026–	Fujieda MYFC	1	(0)
- * Club domestic league appearances and goals as of 13 August 2026

Shun Yoshida (吉田 舜, Yoshida Shun; born 28 November 1996) is a Japanese footballer currently playing as a goalkeeper for Fujieda MYFC.

== Career statistics ==
=== Club ===
As of 23 October 2022.

Club	Season	League			National Cup		League Cup		Other		Total	
Club	Season	Division	Apps	Goals	Apps	Goals	Apps	Goals	Apps	Goals	Apps	Goals
SC Sagamihara	2017	J3 League	0	0	0	0	–		–		0	0
Thespakusatsu Gunma	2019	J3 League	34	0	0	0	–		–		34	0
Oita Trinita	2020	J1 League	0	0	–		0	0	–		0	0
Oita Trinita	2021	J1 League	0	0	1	0	0	0	–		1	0
Oita Trinita	2022	J2 League	11	0	0	0	1	0	0	0	12	0
Oita Trinita	Total		11	0	1	0	1	0	0	0	13	0
Career total			45	0	1	0	1	0	0	0	47	0
