= Hidetoshi Takeda =

Japanese footballer

Hidetoshi Takeda 武田 英寿
Personal information
- Full name: Hidetoshi Takeda
- Date of birth: 15 September 2001 (age 25)
- Place of birth: Sendai, Miyagi, Japan
- Height: 1.75 m (5 ft 9 in)
- Position: Winger

Team information
- Current team: Vegalta Sendai
- Number: 8

Youth career
- Nakano FC
- Vegalta Sendai
- 2017–2019: Aomori Yamada High School

Senior career*
Years	Team	Apps	(Gls)
2020–2024	Urawa Reds	25	(2)
2021	→ FC Ryukyu (loan)	15	(2)
2022	→ Omiya Ardija (loan)	31	(0)
2023	→ Mito Hollyhock (loan)	38	(2)
2025–	Vegalta Sendai	56	(7)

International career^{‡}
2019	Japan U18	3	(0)
2020	Japan U19		
2021–	Japan U20		
- * Club domestic league appearances and goals as of 17 August 2026 ‡ National team caps and goals as of 17:04, 5 August 2020 (UTC)

Hidetoshi Takeda (武田 英寿, Takeda Hidetoshi; born 15 September 2001) is a Japanese professional footballer who plays as a winger for Vegalta Sendai.

== Career statistics ==
=== Club ===
As of 18 April 2024.

Appearances and goals by club, season and competition
Club	Season	League			Cup		League Cup		Other		Total	
Club	Season	Division	Apps	Goals	Apps	Goals	Apps	Goals	Apps	Goals	Apps	Goals
Japan			League		Emperor's Cup		J.League Cup		Other		Total	
Urawa Reds	2020	J1 League	3	0	0	0	1	0	–		4	0
Urawa Reds	2021	J1 League	8	0	0	0	2	0	–		10	0
Urawa Reds	2024	J1 League	0	0	0	0	0	0	–		0	0
Urawa Reds	Total		11	0	0	0	3	0	0	0	14	0
FC Ryukyu (loan)	2021	J2 League	15	2	0	0	–		–		15	2
Omiya Ardija (loan)	2022	J2 League	31	0	2	2	–		–		33	2
Mito Hollyhock (loan)	2023	J2 League	38	2	0	0	–		–		38	2
Career total			95	4	2	2	3	0	0	0	100	6
