= José Kanté =

Association football player (born 1990)

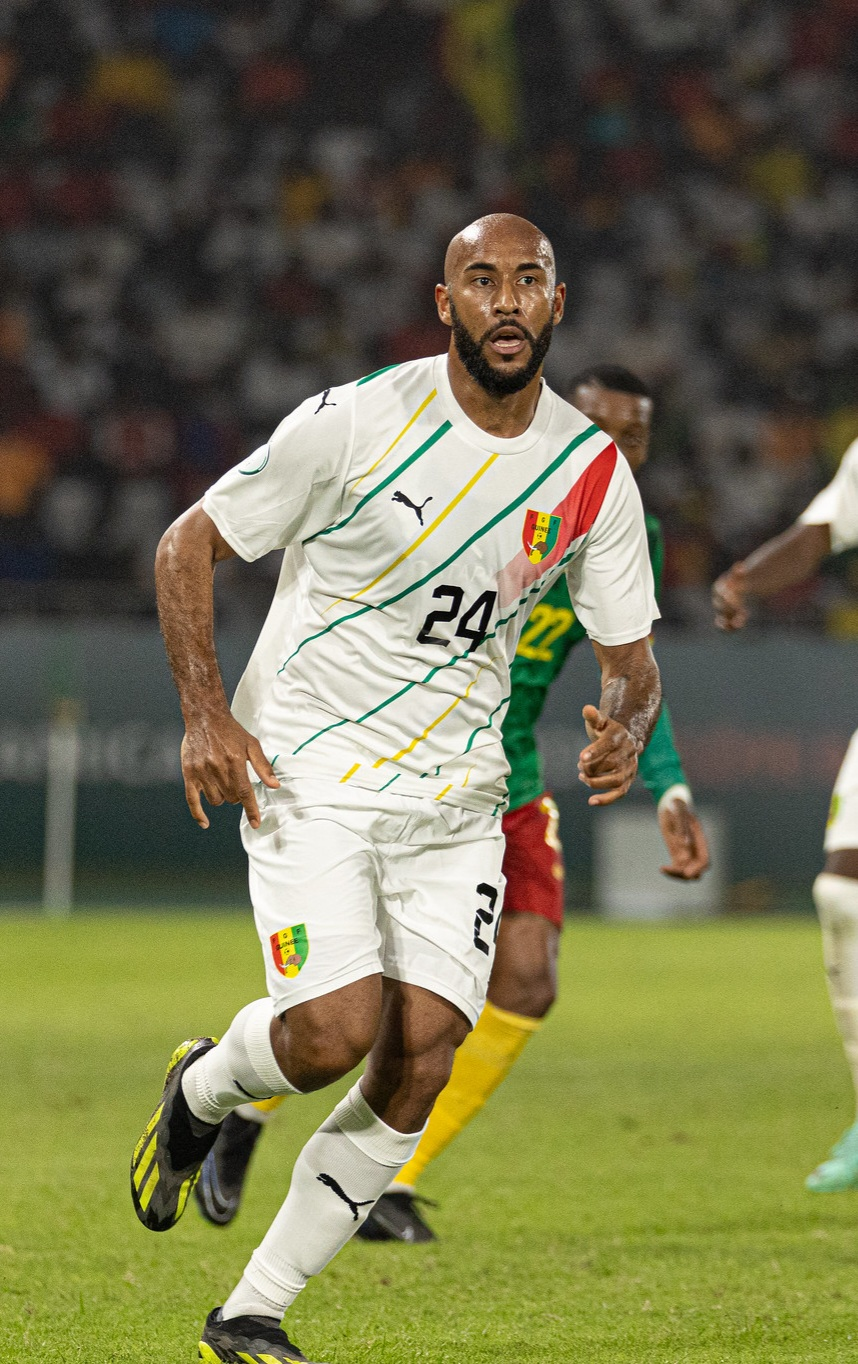
- Kanté with Guinea at the 2023 Africa Cup of Nations

Personal information
- Full name: José Kanté Martínez
- Date of birth: 27 September 1990 (age 36)
- Place of birth: Sabadell, Spain
- Height: 1.84 m (6 ft 0 in)
- Position: Forward

Youth career
- PB Manresa
- 2007–2009: Gimnàstic

Senior career*
Years	Team	Apps	(Gls)
2009–2011	Manresa	8	(0)
2011–2012	Rubí	27	(5)
2012–2013	Prat	14	(5)
2013	Málaga B	11	(2)
2013–2014	Prat	35	(11)
2014–2015	AEK Larnaca	29	(5)
2016	Górnik Zabrze	16	(0)
2016–2018	Wisła Płock	62	(19)
2018–2021	Legia Warsaw	43	(12)
2019	→ Gimnàstic (loan)	14	(3)
2021–2022	Kairat	32	(15)
2022	Cangzhou Mighty Lions	16	(14)
2023	Urawa Red Diamonds	24	(8)
Total		331	(99)

International career
2016–2024	Guinea	30	(4)
- * Club domestic league appearances and goals

José Kanté Martínez (born 27 September 1990) is a former professional footballer who played as a forward.

Born in Spain, he played for the Guinea national team, representing the country in three Africa Cup of Nations.

== Club career ==
Born in Sabadell, Province of Barcelona, Catalonia, Spain, Kanté only played lower league or amateur football in his country of birth initially, representing CE Manresa, UE Rubí, AE Prat (all in his native region) and Atlético Malagueño. He scored his first goal in the Segunda División B while at the service of the third club, in a 2–1 away win against CF Badalona on 11 November 2012.

In June 2014, Kanté signed with Cypriot First Division side AEK Larnaca FC, where he shared teams with a host of compatriots. He played his first top-flight game on 31 August of that year, coming on as a second-half substitute in the 0–2 home loss to APOEL FC.

Kanté moved to the Polish Ekstraklasa in January 2016, going on to remain several years in the country with Górnik Zabrze and Wisła Płock. In the 2016–17 season he scored ten goals, helping to a final ninth-place finish.

On 18 June 2018, Kanté signed for Legia Warsaw in the same league. The following 31 January, he joined Gimnàstic de Tarragona on loan for the remainder of the campaign in the Segunda División.

Kanté terminated his Legia contract by mutual consent on 23 February 2021. On 10 March, he moved to Kazakhstan Premier League club FC Kairat on a deal until December 2022, but left four months before it expired.

On 27 August 2022, Kanté joined Cangzhou Mighty Lions F.C. on a free transfer. On 24 September, in his third appearance and first start in the Chinese Super League, he scored all of his team's goals in a 4–3 victory over leaders Wuhan Three Towns FC, which ended the opponents' 17-game unbeaten run since getting promoted the previous season.

In 2023, Kante signed for J1 League club Urawa Red Diamonds. On 27 November that year, having scored 12 times in all competitions, the 33-year-old announced his retirement at the end of the campaign.

== International career ==
Of Guinean descent, Kanté opted to represent that nation even though he did not speak French nor any of the local dialects when he was first summoned by manager Kanfory Lappé Bangoura in November 2016. He earned his first cap on the 13th, playing 25 minutes in a 1–2 home defeat against DR Congo for the 2018 FIFA World Cup qualifiers.

Kanté was included in the squads for Guinea at the 2019, 2021 and 2023 Africa Cup of Nations.

== Career statistics ==
=== Club ===
Appearances and goals by club, season and competition
Club	Season	League			National cup (Note: Includes Copa del Rey, Cypriot Cup, Polish Cup, Kazakhstan Cup, Emperor's Cup)		League cup (Note: Includes J.League Cup)		Continental		Other		Total	
Club	Season	Division	Apps	Goals	Apps	Goals	Apps	Goals	Apps	Goals	Apps	Goals	Apps	Goals
Prat	2012–13	Segunda División B	14	5	2	0	–		–		–		16	5
Prat	2013–14	Segunda División B	35	11	–		–		–		–		35	11
Prat	Total		49	16	2	0	–		–		–		51	16
AEK Larnaca	2014–15	Cypriot First Division	17	3	4	1	–		–		–		21	4
AEK Larnaca	2015–16	Cypriot First Division	12	2	1	1	–		2 (Note: Appearances in UEFA Europa League)	0	–		15	3
AEK Larnaca	Total		29	5	5	2	–		2	0	–		36	7
Górnik Zabrze	2015–16	Ekstraklasa	16	0	–		–		–		–		16	0
Wisła Płock	2016–17	Ekstraklasa	32	10	0	0	–		–		–		32	10
Wisła Płock	2017–18	Ekstraklasa	30	9	1	0	–		–		–		31	9
Wisła Płock	Total		62	19	1	0	–		–		–		63	19
Legia Warsaw	2018–19	Ekstraklasa	16	2	2	0	–		6 (Note: Four appearances and one goal in UEFA Champions League, two appearances and two goals in UEFA Europa League)	3	1 (Note: Appearance in Polish Super Cup)	0	25	5
Legia Warsaw	2019–20	Ekstraklasa	23	10	4	3	–		0	0	–		27	13
Legia Warsaw	2020–21	Ekstraklasa	4	0	0	0	–		3 (Note: Two appearances and one goal in UEFA Champions League, one appearance in UEFA Europa League)	1	0	0	7	1
Legia Warsaw	Total		43	12	6	3	–		9	4	1	0	59	19
Gimnàstic (loan)	2018–19	Segunda División	14	3	–		–		–		–		14	3
Kairat	2021	Kazakhstan Premier League	22	9	5	4	–		11 (Note: Three appearances and one goal in UEFA Champions League, one appearance in UEFA Europa League, seven appearances and three goals in UEFA Europa Conference League)	4	–		38	17
Kairat	2022	Kazakhstan Premier League	10	6	2	0	–		1 (Note: Appearance in UEFA Europa Conference League)	0	1 (Note: Appearance in Kazakhstan Super Cup)	0	14	6
Kairat	Total		32	15	7	4	–		12	4	1	0	52	23
Cangzhou Mighty Lions	2022	Chinese Super League	16	14	0	0	–		–		–		16	14
Urawa Red Diamonds	2022	J1 League	–		–		–		2 (Note: Appearances in AFC Champions League)	0	–		2	0
Urawa Red Diamonds	2023	J1 League	24	8	3	0	8	1	5	4	3 (Note: Appearances in FIFA Club World Cup)	1	43	14
Urawa Red Diamonds	Total		24	8	3	0	8	1	7	4	3	1	45	14
Career total			285	92	24	9	8	1	30	12	5	1	352	115

=== International ===
Appearances and goals by national team and year
National team	Year	Apps	Goals
Guinea	2016	1	0
Guinea	2017	1	0
Guinea	2018	4	1
Guinea	2019	7	1
Guinea	2021	8	2
Guinea	2022	5	0
Guinea	2023	2	0
Guinea	2024	2	0
Total		30	4

Scores and results list Guinea goal tally first, score column indicates score after each Kanté goal.

List of international goals scored by José Kanté
No.	Date	Venue	Opponent	Score	Result	Competition
1	16 October 2018	Stade Régional Nyamirambo, Kigali, Rwanda	Rwanda	1–0	1–1	2019 Africa Cup of Nations qualification
2	17 November 2019	Stade du 28 Septembre, Conakry, Guinea	Namibia	2–0	2–0	2021 Africa Cup of Nations qualification
3	8 June 2021	Arslan Zeki Demirci Sports Complex, Manavgat, Turkey	Kosovo	2–0	2–1	Friendly
4	9 October 2021	Adrar Stadium, Agadir, Morocco	Sudan	1–0	2–2	2022 FIFA World Cup qualification

== Honours ==
Legia Warsaw

- Ekstraklasa: 2019–20, 2020–21

Kairat

- Kazakhstan Cup: 2021

Urawa Red Diamonds

- AFC Champions League: 2022

Individual

- Ekstraklasa Player of the Month: February 2020
