= Takahiro Akimoto =

Japanese footballer (born 1998)

Personal information
- Full name: Takahiro Akimoto
- Date of birth: 31 January 1998 (age 28)
- Place of birth: Utsunomiya, Tochigi, Japan
- Height: 1.70 m (5 ft 7 in)
- Position: Left-back

Team information
- Current team: Machida Zelvia
- Number: 33

Youth career
- FC Mirai
- –2015: Tochigi SC

College career
Years	Team	Apps	(Gls)
2016–2019	Kokushikan University		

Senior career*
Years	Team	Apps	(Gls)
2020	Tochigi	40	(7)
2021–2024	Urawa Reds	89	(7)
2024	→ OH Leuven (loan)	15	(0)
2024–2026	OH Leuven	56	(0)
2026–	Machida Zelvia		
- * Club domestic league appearances and goals as of 1 June 2026

Takahiro Akimoto (明本 考浩, Akimoto Takahiro; born 31 January 1998) is a Japanese footballer currently playing as a left-back for J1 League club, Machida Zelvia.

== Early life ==
Takahiro was born in Utsunomiya. He played for Yanase FC, Tochigi SC and Kokushikan University.

== Career ==
Takahiro made his debut for Tochigi against V-Varen Nagasaki on 23 February 2020. He scored his first goal for the club against Fagiano Okayama on 12 August 2020, scoring in the 27th minute.

Takahiro made his debut for Urawa against FC Tokyo on 27 February 2021. He scored his first goal for the club against Kashima Antlers on 3 April 2021, scoring in the 37rd minute.

On 20 January 2024, Akimoto was announced at OH Leuven, where he was loaned from Urawa Red Diamonds until the end of the 2023–24 season, with buy clause.

== Career statistics ==
=== Club ===
As of 01 April 2023.

Club	Season	League			National Cup		League Cup		Continental		Other		Total	
Club	Season	Division	Apps	Goals	Apps	Goals	Apps	Goals	Apps	Goals	Apps	Goals	Apps	Goals
Tochigi SC	2020	J2 League	40	7	0	0	0	0	–		0	0	28	7
Tochigi SC	Total		40	7	0	0	0	0	–		0	0	28	7
Urawa Reds	2021	J1 League	33	4	4	0	10	0	0	0	0	0	47	4
Urawa Reds	2022	J1 League	31	0	2	1	4	0	9	2	1	0	46	3
Urawa Reds	2023	J1 League	6	2	0	0	1	0	0	0	1	0	7	2
Urawa Reds	Total		70	6	6	1	15	0	9	2	2	0	102	9
Career total			110	13	6	1	15	0	9	2	2	0	130	16

== Honours ==
=== Club ===
Urawa Red Diamonds

- Emperor's Cup: 2021
- Japanese Super Cup: 2022
- AFC Champions League: 2022
- J.League Cup: 2023 (runners-up)
