= Kōta Kudō =

Japanese footballer

Kōta Kudō 工藤 孝太
Personal information
- Full name: Kōta Kudō
- Date of birth: 13 August 2003 (age 23)
- Place of birth: Wakayama, Japan
- Height: 1.80 m (5 ft 11 in)
- Position: Centre back

Team information
- Current team: Urawa Reds
- Number: 15

Youth career
- Nanki JSC
- –2021: Urawa Red Diamonds

Senior career*
Years	Team	Apps	(Gls)
2021–	Urawa Red Diamonds	1	(0)
2023	→ Fujieda MYFC (loan)	6	(0)
2024	→ Giravanz Kitakyushu (loan)	36	(2)
2025–2026	→ Fagiano Okayama (loan)	33	(0)

International career^{‡}
2019	Japan U16	2	(0)
2022	Japan U21	2	(0)
- * Club domestic league appearances and goals as of 10 August 2026 ‡ National team caps and goals as of 15:55, 22 January 2024 (UTC)

Kōta Kudō (工藤 孝太, Kudō Kōta; born 13 August 2003) is a Japanese professional footballer who plays as a centre back for J1 League club Urawa Red Diamonds.

== Career ==
Kudō is a native of Tanabe, Wakayama, and played for the youth teams of Urawa Reds. On 5 March 2021, Kudō was registered as a type-2 player with the Urawa Reds first team. He made his professional debut against Yokohama FC in the J.League Cup on 21 April 2021. On 14 May 2021, he signed his first professional contract with Urawa Reds. Kudō was promoted to the first team from the 2022 season. Kudō was part of the team who won the 2022 AFC Champions League.

On 23 December 2022, Kudō was announced at Fujieda MYFC on a one year developmental loan.

On 8 January 2024, Kudō was announced at Giravanz Kitakyushu on a one year developmental loan. He made his league debut against SC Sagamihara on 24 February 2024. He scored his first professional league goal against FC Gifu on 21 September 2024, scoring in the 5th minute. During his season at Giravanz Kitakyushu, he was nominated for the J3 League Best XI, but did not make the final team.

On 5 January 2025, Kudō was announced at Fagiano Okayama on a one year developmental loan.

== International career ==
On November 10 2021, Kudō was called up to the Japan U18 for a camp.

== Personal life ==
Kudō's sister is model and talent Naoyuki Kudo.

== Career statistics ==
=== Club ===
As of 15 March 2023.

Appearances and goals by club, season and competition
Club	Season	League			Cup		League Cup		Other		Total	
Club	Season	Division	Apps	Goals	Apps	Goals	Apps	Goals	Apps	Goals	Apps	Goals
Japan			League		Emperor's Cup		J.League Cup		Other		Total	
Urawa Reds	2021	J1 League	0	0	0	0	1	0	–		1	0
Urawa Reds	2022	J1 League	0	0	0	0	0	0	1 (Note: Appearances in the AFC Champions League)	0	1	0
Urawa Reds	Total		0	0	0	0	1	0	1	0	2	0
Fujieda MYFC (loan)	2023	J2 League	0	0	0	0	–		–		0	0
Career total			0	0	0	0	1	0	1	0	2	0

== Honours ==
=== Club ===
Urawa Red Diamonds

- AFC Champions League: 2022
