= Ken Iwao =

Japanese footballer (born 1988)

Ken Iwao 岩尾 憲
Personal information
- Full name: Ken Iwao
- Date of birth: 18 April 1988 (age 38)
- Place of birth: Tatebayashi, Japan
- Height: 1.75 m (5 ft 9 in)
- Position: Defensive midfielder

Team information
- Current team: Tokushima Vortis
- Number: 8

Youth career
- 2000: Tonan SC
- 2001–2003: Tatara Junior High School
- 2004–2006: Nishiora High School

College career
Years	Team	Apps	(Gls)
2007–2010	Nippon Sport Science University		

Senior career*
Years	Team	Apps	(Gls)
2011–2015	Shonan Bellmare	40	(0)
2015	→ Mito HollyHock (loan)	41	(1)
2016–2022	Tokushima Vortis	239	(25)
2022	→ Urawa Red Diamonds (loan)	29	(1)
2023–2024	Urawa Red Diamonds	45	(1)
2024–	Tokushima Vortis	31	(0)
- * Club domestic league appearances and goals as of 14 August 2026

Ken Iwao (岩尾 憲, born 18 April 1988) is a Japanese professional footballer who plays as a defensive midfielder for J2 League club Tokushima Vortis.

Primarily known for his time at Tokushima Vortis, where he is currently captain, Iwao has made over 400 J League appearances.

== Career ==
Born in Tatebayashi City, Iwao joined Shonan Bellmare from Nippon Sport Science University for the 2011 season.

On 7 December 2014, Iwao was announced at Mito HollyHock on a one year loan deal.

On 28 December 2015, Iwao was announced at Tokushima Vortis on a permanent transfer. At the start of the 2017 season, he was appointed as captain. Iwao was named as "one to watch" ahead of the 2021 season.

On 7 January 2022, Iwao was announced at Urawa Reds on a one year loan deal.

On 17 November 2022, Iwao was announced at Urawa Reds on a permanent transfer. On 6 May 2023, Iwao won the 2022 AFC Champions League. In August 2023, Iwao won the 2023 July Meiji Yasuda J.LEAGUE KONAMI Monthly Best Goal award for his 38th minute goal against Sagan Tosu. Iwao was also part of the Urawa Reds team called up for the 2023 FIFA Club World Cup.

On 27 June 2024, Iwao was announced at Tokushima Vortis on a permanent transfer. On 14 September 2024, he played his 400th match in the J League pyramid against Oita Trinita. Iwao renewed his contract with the club ahead of the 2025 season. On 4 February 2025, he was appointed as captain ahead of the 2025 season.

== Style of play ==
Iwao is described as having "outstanding" leadership and tactical knowledge of the game.

== Career statistics ==
As of 18 April 2024

Appearances and goals by club, season and competition
Club	Season	League			Emperor's Cup		J.League Cup		Other		Total	
Club	Season	Division	Apps	Goals	Apps	Goals	Apps	Goals	Apps	Goals	Apps	Goals
Shonan Bellmare	2011	J2 League	8	0	3	0	–		–		11	0
Shonan Bellmare	2012	J2 League	2	0	0	0	–		–		2	0
Shonan Bellmare	2013	J1 League	7	0	2	0	3	0	–		12	0
Shonan Bellmare	2014	J2 League	23	0	0	0	–		–		2	0
Shonan Bellmare	Total		40	0	5	0	3	0	0	0	48	0
Mito Hollyhock (loan)	2015	J2 League	41	1	2	0	–		–		43	1
Tokushima Vortis	2016	J2 League	39	1	1	0	–		–		40	1
Tokushima Vortis	2017	J2 League	41	4	0	0	–		–		41	4
Tokushima Vortis	2018	J2 League	39	5	1	0	–		–		40	5
Tokushima Vortis	2019	J2 League	41	6	0	0	–		3 (Note: Appearances in the J1/J2 Play-offs)	0	44	6
Tokushima Vortis	2020	J2 League	42	6	2	1	–		–		44	7
Tokushima Vortis	2021	J1 League	37	3	2	1	0	0	–		39	4
Tokushima Vortis	Total		239	25	6	2	0	0	3	0	248	27
Urawa Reds (loan)	2022	J1 League	29	1	2	0	4	0	8 (Note: 1 appearance in the Super Cup) (Note: 7 appearances in the AFC Champions League)	0	43	1
Urawa Reds	2023	J1 League	33	1	2	0	7	0	11 (Note: 8 appearances in the AFC Champions League) (Note: 3 appearances in the FIFA Club World Cup)	0	53	1
Urawa Reds	2024	J1 League	7	0	0	0	0	0	0	0	7	0
Urawa Reds	Total		40	1	2	0	7	0	11	0	60	1
Career total			389	28	17	2	14	0	22	0	442	30

== Honours ==
=== Club ===
Urawa Red Diamonds

- Japanese Super Cup: 2022
- AFC Champions League: 2022
