= Yūta Miyamoto =

Japanese footballer (born 1999)

Yūta Miyamoto 宮本 優太
Personal information
- Date of birth: 15 December 1999 (age 26)
- Place of birth: Nerima, Tokyo, Japan
- Height: 1.70 m (5 ft 7 in)
- Positions: Right back; defensive midfielder

Team information
- Current team: Urawa Red Diamonds
- Number: 2

Youth career
- Tagara FC
- Forza'02
- 2015–2017: RKU Kashiwa High School

College career
Years	Team	Apps	(Gls)
2018–2021	Ryutsu Keizai University		

Senior career*
Years	Team	Apps	(Gls)
2018	Ryutsu Keizai University FC	1	(0)
2020–	Urawa Red Diamonds	32	(0)
2023	→ Deinze (loan)	2	(0)
2024–2025	Kyoto Sanga FC (Loan)	56	(1)
- * Club domestic league appearances and goals as of 10 August 2026

Yūta Miyamoto (宮本 優太, Miyamoto Yūta; born 15 December 1999) is a Japanese footballer who plays as a right back or a defensive midfielder for Urawa Red Diamonds.

== Career ==
In January 2023, Miyamoto joined Challenger Pro League club Deinze on loan until the end of the season.

== Career statistics ==
=== Club ===
As of 10 January 2023.

Club	Season	League			National Cup		League Cup		Other		Total	
Club	Season	Division	Apps	Goals	Apps	Goals	Apps	Goals	Apps	Goals	Apps	Goals
Ryutsu Keizai University FC	2018	Kantō Soccer League	1	0	–		–		0	0	1	0
Ryutsu Keizai University	2019	–			2 (Note: Appearances in the Emperor's Cup)	0	–		0	0	2	0
Ryutsu Keizai University	2021	–			1	0	–		0	0	1	0
Ryutsu Keizai University	Total		0	0	3	0	0	0	0	0	3	0
Urawa Reds	2020	J1 League	0	0	0	0	0	0	0	0	0	0
Urawa Reds	2021	J1 League	0	0	0	0	0	0	0	0	0	0
Urawa Reds	2022	J1 League	15	0	2	0	1	0	1 (Note: Appearances in the Japanese Super Cup)	0	19	0
Urawa Reds	Total		15	0	2	0	1	0	1	0	19	0
Career total			16	0	5	0	1	0	1	0	23	0

== Honours ==
=== Club ===
Urawa Red Diamonds

- Japanese Super Cup: 2022
