= Alexander Scholz =

Danish footballer (born 1992)

Personal information
- Full name: Alexander Scholz
- Date of birth: 24 October 1992 (age 34)
- Place of birth: Copenhagen, Denmark
- Height: 1.89 m (6 ft 2 in)
- Position: Centre-back

Team information
- Current team: FC Tokyo
- Number: 24

Youth career
- Hedensted
- Vejle

Senior career*
Years	Team	Apps	(Gls)
2010–2012	Vejle	17	(0)
2012	Stjarnan	21	(5)
2012–2015	Lokeren	70	(1)
2015–2018	Standard Liège	75	(1)
2018	Club Brugge	6	(0)
2018–2021	Midtjylland	92	(12)
2021–2024	Urawa Red Diamonds	94	(14)
2024–2025	Al-Wakrah	20	(0)
2025–	FC Tokyo	26	(3)

International career
2010–2011	Denmark U19	4	(0)
2014–2015	Denmark U21	14	(0)
- * Club domestic league appearances and goals as of 22:32, 8 April 2026 (UTC)

Alexander Scholz (born 24 October 1992) is a Danish professional footballer who plays as a centre-back for J1 League club FC Tokyo.

== Early life ==
Scholz' parents are German. He was raised in the Vejle area in Denmark.

== Club career ==
Scholz started his career with Hedensted IF, before being scouted by Vejle Boldklub. He later moved to Stjarnan in Iceland. In 2012, Belgian team Lokeren started scouting him following a tip from their former player Arnar Grétarsson, who had seen Scholz play in Iceland. Based on these scouting reports, Lokeren signed Scholz in December 2012, giving him a contract until 2015. Just a few days later on 19 January 2013, he made his debut in the Belgian top league in a 2–6 won away match against OH Leuven. He scored the winning goal in a 1–0 win for Lokeren in the final of the 2014 Belgian Cup Final.

Scholz signed a five-year contract with FC Midtjylland in August 2018. On 1 December 2020, Scholz scored a goal for FC Midtjylland in a UEFA Champions League group stage match against Atalanta; the final score was 1–1.

On 31 May 2021, it was announced that Scholz had signed a contract with J1 League club Urawa Red Diamonds. There, he would join his compatriot Kasper Junker, who had signed with the Japanese club a month prior. He left the club at the end of June 2024. Prior to his departure, both he and Hiroki Sakai were given a farewell sendoff following the club's matches against Júbilo Iwata on 30 June 2024.

== International career ==
In November 2020, he was called up to Kasper Hjulmand's senior squad for the friendly against Sweden due to several cancellations from, among others, the Danish national team players playing in England, due to the COVID-19 restrictions, as well as a case of COVID-19 in the squad, which had put several national team players in quarantine.

== Career statistics ==
=== Club ===
As of 8 April 2026

Appearances and goals by club, season and competition
Club	Season	League			National cup (Note: Includes Icelandic Men's Football Cup, Belgian Cup, Danish Cup, Emperor's Cup, Amir of Qatar Cup)		League cup (Note: Includes J.League Cup, QSL Cup)		Continental		Other		Total	
Club	Season	Division	Apps	Goals	Apps	Goals	Apps	Goals	Apps	Goals	Apps	Goals	Apps	Goals
Vejle	2009–10	Danish 1st Division	1	0	0	0	—		—		—		0	0
Vejle	2010–11	Danish 1st Division	16	0	0	0	—		—		—		0	0
Vejle	Total		17	0	0	0	—		—		—		17	0
Stjarnan	2012	Úrvalsdeild karla	21	5	5	2	—		—		—		26	7
Lokeren	2012–13	Belgian Pro League	11	0	0	0	—		—		—		11	0
Lokeren	2013–14	Belgian Pro League	38	1	7	1	—		—		—		45	2
Lokeren	2014–15	Belgian Pro League	21	0	3	0	—		8 (Note: Appearances in UEFA Europa League)	0	—		32	0
Lokeren	Total		70	1	10	1	—		8	0	—		88	2
Standard Liège	2014–15	Belgian Pro League	16	0	0	0	—		—		—		16	0
Standard Liège	2015–16	Belgian Pro League	15	0	5	0	—		1	0	—		21	0
Standard Liège	2016–17	Belgian First Division A	33	1	1	0	—		6	0	1 (Note: Appearance in Belgian Super Cup)	0	41	1
Standard Liège	2017–18	Belgian First Division A	11	0	2	0	—		—		—		13	0
Standard Liège	Total		75	1	8	0	—		7	0	1	0	91	1
Club Brugge	2017–18	Belgian First Division A	5	0	1	0	—		—		—		6	0
Club Brugge	2018–19	Belgian First Division A	1	0	0	0	—		—		—		1	0
Club Brugge	Total		6	0	1	0	—		—		—		7	0
Midtjylland	2018–19	Danish Superliga	27	3	4	0	—		2	0	—		33	3
Midtjylland	2019–20	Danish Superliga	34	2	0	0	—		2	0	—		36	2
Midtjylland	2020–21	Danish Superliga	31	7	4	0	—		10 (Note: Appearances in UEFA Champions League)	3	—		45	10
Midtjylland	Total		92	12	8	0	—		14	3	—		114	15
Urawa Reds	2021	J1 League	15	0	4	0	4	0	0	0	0	0	23	0
Urawa Reds	2022	J1 League	32	6	2	0	4	0	8 (Note: Appearances in AFC Champions League Elite)	2	1 (Note: Appearance in Japanese Super Cup)	0	47	8
Urawa Reds	2023	J1 League	34	7	2	0	6	2	6	2	3 (Note: Appearance in FIFA Club World Cup)	1	51	12
Urawa Reds	2024	J1 League	13	1	0	0	1	0	0	0	0	0	14	1
Urawa Reds	Total		94	14	8	0	15	2	14	4	4	1	135	21
Al-Wakrah SC	2024–25	QSL	20	0	1	0	6	0	6 (Note: Appearances in AFC Champions League Two)	0	1 (Note: Appearance in Sheikh Jassim Cup)	0	34	0
FC Tokyo	2025	J1 League	16	2	4	0	–		–		–		20	2
FC Tokyo	2026	J1 (100)	10	1	0	0	–		–		–		10	1
FC Tokyo	Total		26	3	4	0	0	0	0	0	0	0	30	3
Career total			421	36	45	3	21	2	49	7	6	1	512	49

== Honours ==
Lokeren

- Belgian Cup: 2013–14

Standard Liège

- Belgian Cup: 2015–16

Club Brugge

- Belgian First Division A: 2017–18
- Belgian Super Cup: 2018

Midtjylland

- Danish Superliga: 2019–20
- Danish Cup: 2018–19

Urawa Red Diamonds

- Emperor's Cup: 2021
- Japanese Super Cup: 2022
- AFC Champions League: 2022

Individual

- Danish Superliga Player of the Year: 2020–21
- J.League Best XI: 2023
