= Kai Matsuzaki =

Japanese footballer

Kai Matsuzaki 松崎 快
Personal information
- Date of birth: 22 November 1997 (age 28)
- Height: 1.72 m (5 ft 8 in)
- Position: Winger

Team information
- Current team: Shimizu S-Pulse
- Number: 19

Youth career
- Kawagoe Himawari SC
- –2015: Omiya Ardija

College career
Years	Team	Apps	(Gls)
2016–2019	Toyo University		

Senior career*
Years	Team	Apps	(Gls)
2020–2022	Mito HollyHock	74	(9)
2022–2023	Urawa Red Diamonds	14	(1)
2023	→ Vegalta Sendai (loan)	11	(0)
2024–	Shimizu S-Pulse	69	(6)
- * Club domestic league appearances and goals as of 10 August 2026

Kai Matsuzaki (松崎 快, Matsuzaki Kai; born 22 November 1997) is a Japanese professional footballer currently playing as a winger for J1 League club Shimizu S-Pulse.

== Career statistics ==
=== Club ===
As of 27 April 2024

Appearances and goals by club, season and competition
Club	Season	League			National Cup		League Cup		Other		Total	
Club	Season	Division	Apps	Goals	Apps	Goals	Apps	Goals	Apps	Goals	Apps	Goals
Japan			League		Emperor's Cup		J. League Cup		Other		Total	
Mito HollyHock	2020	J2 League	33	1	0	0	–		–		33	1
Mito HollyHock	2021	J2 League	41	8	1	0	–		–		42	8
Mito HollyHock	Total		74	9	1	0	0	0	0	0	75	9
Urawa Reds	2022	J1 League	11	1	2	0	2	0	4 (Note: Appearance in the Japanese Super Cup) (Note: Appearances in the AFC Champions League)	0	19	1
Urawa Reds	2023	J1 League	3	0	0	0	1	0	–		4	0
Urawa Reds	Total		14	1	2	0	3	0	4	0	23	1
Vegalta Sendai (loan)	2023	J2 League	11	0	0	0	–		–		11	0
Shimizu S-Pulse	2024	J2 League	11	1	0	0	1	0	–		12	1
Career total			110	11	3	0	4	0	4	0	121	11

== Honours ==
=== Club ===
Urawa Red Diamonds

- Japanese Super Cup: 2022
- AFC Champions League: 2022
