= Kaito Yasui =

Japanese footballer (born 2000)

Kaito Yasui 安居 海渡
Personal information
- Full name: Kaito Yasui
- Date of birth: 9 February 2000 (age 26)
- Place of birth: Saitama, Japan
- Height: 1.74 m (5 ft 9 in)
- Position: Attacking midfielder

Team information
- Current team: Urawa Reds
- Number: 25

Youth career
- Kawaguchi Asahi Revolver SSS
- Bunan FC
- 2015–2017: Urawa Gakuin High School

College career
| Years | Team | Apps | (Gls) |
| 2018–2021 | Ryutsu Keizai University | | |

Senior career*
| Years | Team | Apps | (Gls) |
| 2018 | Ryutsu Keizai University FC | 6 | (0) |
| 2018 | RKD Ryugasaki | 12 | (1) |
| 2022– | Urawa Reds | 126 | (7) |
- * Club domestic league appearances and goals as of 10 August 2026

Kaito Yasui (安居 海渡, Yasui Kaito; born 9 February 2000) is a Japanese footballer currently playing as an attacking midfielder for Urawa Reds.

== Career statistics ==
=== Club ===
As of 31 January 2023.

| Club | Season | League | | | National Cup | | League Cup | | Other | | Total | |
| Club | Season | Division | Apps | Goals | Apps | Goals | Apps | Goals | Apps | Goals | Apps | Goals |
|---|---|---|---|---|---|---|---|---|---|---|---|---|
| Ryutsu Keizai University FC | 2018 | Kantō Soccer League | 6 | 0 | 0 | 0 | – | | 0 | 0 | 6 | 0 |
| RKD Ryugasaki | 2018 | JFL | 12 | 1 | 0 | 0 | – | | 0 | 0 | 12 | 1 |
| Ryutsu Keizai University | 2019 | – | | | 2 (Note: Appearances in the Emperor's Cup) | 0 | – | | 0 | 0 | 2 | 0 |
| Ryutsu Keizai University | 2021 | – | | | 1 | 1 | – | | 0 | 0 | 1 | 1 |
| Ryutsu Keizai University | Total | | 0 | 0 | 3 | 1 | 0 | 0 | 0 | 0 | 3 | 1 |
| Urawa Reds | 2022 | J1 League | 6 | 0 | 0 | 0 | 0 | 0 | 6 (Note: Appearances in the AFC Champions League) | 2 | 12 | 2 |
| Urawa Reds | 2023 | J1 League | 0 | 0 | 0 | 0 | 0 | 0 | 0 | 0 | 0 | 0 |
| Urawa Reds | Total | | 6 | 0 | 0 | 0 | 0 | 0 | 6 | 2 | 12 | 2 |
| Career total | | | 25 | 1 | 3 | 1 | 0 | 0 | 6 | 2 | 33 | 4 |

== Honours ==
=== Club ===
Urawa Red Diamonds

- AFC Champions League: 2022
