= Tomoaki Ōkubo =

Japanese footballer (born 1998)

Tomoaki Ōkubo 大久保 智明
Personal information
- Full name: Tomoaki Ōkubo
- Date of birth: 23 July 1998 (age 28)
- Place of birth: Tokyo, Japan
- Height: 1.70 m (5 ft 7 in)
- Position: Winger

Team information
- Current team: Kashiwa Reysol
- Number: 14

Youth career
- Beetle Eleven
- –2016: Tokyo Verdy

College career
Years	Team	Apps	(Gls)
2017–2020	Chuo University		

Senior career*
Years	Team	Apps	(Gls)
2021–2025	Urawa Reds	110	(6)
2026–	Kashiwa Reysol	6	(0)
- * Club domestic league appearances and goals as of 10 August 2026

Tomoaki Ōkubo (大久保 智明, Ōkubo Tomoaki; born 23 July 1998) is a Japanese footballer currently playing as a winger for J1 League club Kashiwa Reysol.

== Career statistics ==
=== Club ===
As of 23 March 2026.

Appearances and goals by club, season and competition
Club	Season	League			National cup (Note: Includes Emperors Cup)		League cup (Note: Includes J.League Cup)		Continental		Other		Total	
Club	Season	Division	Apps	Goals	Apps	Goals	Apps	Goals	Apps	Goals	Apps	Goals	Apps	Goals
Urawa Reds	2021	J1 League	18	1	5	0	4	0	0	0	0	0	27	1
Urawa Reds	2022	J1 League	23	1	2	0	4	0	6 (Note: Appearances in AFC Champions League Elite)	0	0	0	35	1
Urawa Reds	2023	J1 League	30	1	3	0	5	0	6	0	2 (Note: Appearances in FIFA Club World Cup)	0	46	1
Urawa Reds	2024	J1 League	23	2	0	0	0	0	0	0	0	0	23	2
Urawa Reds	2025	J1 League	16	1	1	0	2	0	0	0	1	0	20	1
Urawa Reds	Total		110	6	11	0	15	0	12	0	3	0	151	6
Kashiwa Reysol	2026	J1 (100)	1	0	–		–		–		–		1	0
Career total			111	6	11	0	15	0	12	0	3	0	152	6

== Honours ==
=== Club ===
Urawa Red Diamonds

- Emperor's Cup: 2021
- Japanese Super Cup: 2022
- AFC Champions League: 2022
