= Takahiro Sekine =

Japanese footballer (born 1995)

Takahiro Sekine 関根 貴大
Personal information
- Full name: Takahiro Sekine
- Date of birth: 19 April 1995 (age 31)
- Place of birth: Tsurugashima, Saitama, Japan
- Height: 1.67 m (5 ft 6 in)
- Position: Winger

Team information
- Current team: Sydney FC
- Number: 14

Youth career
- 2002–2007: FC Tsurugashima
- 2008–2013: Urawa Red Diamonds

Senior career*
Years	Team	Apps	(Gls)
2013–2017	Urawa Red Diamonds	110	(13)
2017–2019	FC Ingolstadt 04	1	(0)
2017–2018	FC Ingolstadt 04 II	3	(0)
2018–2019	→ Sint-Truiden (loan)	11	(1)
2019–2026	Urawa Red Diamonds	193	(13)
2026–	Sydney FC	0	(0)

International career^{‡}
2014	Japan U-19	4	(0)
Medal record
Urawa Reds
Winner	AFC Champions League	2017
Runner-up	J1 League	2014
Runner-up	J1 League	2016
Winner	J.League Cup	2016
Runner-up	J.League Cup	2013
Runner-up	Emperor's Cup	2015
- * Club domestic league appearances and goals as of 12 September 2025 ‡ National team caps and goals as of 17 October 2014

Takahiro Sekine (関根 貴大, Sekine Takahiro; born 19 April 1995) is a Japanese footballer who plays as a winger for A-League Men club Sydney FC.

== Career ==
In August 2017, Sekine left Urawa Red Diamonds to join FC Ingolstadt 04 in Bundesliga 2. In July 2018, he signed with Sint-Truidense in Belgian Pro League on loan, joined with his teammates Takehiro Tomiyasu.

After having spent 2 years abroad in Europe, Sekine returned to former club in J1, Urawa Red Diamonds for mid 2019 season. He was named Urawa Red Diamonds captain for 2025 season.

== Personal life ==
On 22 December 2017, he married a former SKE48 member Kaneko Shiori, after dating for two and a half years.

== Career statistics ==
=== Club ===
As of the match played 22 February 2025.

Appearances and goals by club, season and competition
Club	Season	League			Cup		League Cup		Continental		Other^{1}		Total	
Club	Season	Division	Apps	Goals	Apps	Goals	Apps	Goals	Apps	Goals	Apps	Goals	Apps	Goals
Urawa Red Diamonds	2013	J.League Div 1	0	0	1	0	0	0	0	0	–		1	0
Urawa Red Diamonds	2014	J.League Div 1	21	2	2	1	6	0	2	0	–		31	3
Urawa Red Diamonds	2015	J1 League	32	6	4	2	2	0	2	0	2	0	42	8
Urawa Red Diamonds	2016	J1 League	34	2	1	0	5	0	5	0	2	0	47	2
Urawa Red Diamonds	2017	J1 League	22	3	0	0	0	0	5	2	1	0	28	5
Ingolstadt	2017–18	2. Bundesliga	1	0	1	0	—		—		—		2	0
Sint-Truidense	2018–19	Belgian Pro League	3	0	0	0	—		—		—		3	0
Urawa Red Diamonds	2019	J1 League	16	1	1	0	2	1	6	1	0	0	25	3
Urawa Red Diamonds	2020	J1 League	24	2	–		2	0	–		–		26	2
Urawa Red Diamonds	2021	J1 League	36	3	5	1	10	3	–		–		51	7
Urawa Red Diamonds	2022	J1 League	30	1	2	0	3	0	11	0	1	0	47	1
Urawa Red Diamonds	2023	J1 League	32	3	2	0	8	0	0	0	0	0	42	3
Urawa Red Diamonds	2024	J1 League	21	2	0	0	0	0	5	2	3	0	29	4
Urawa Red Diamonds	2025	J1 League	34	1	1	0	2	0	0	0	3	0	40	1
Urawa Red Diamonds	Urawa Red Diamonds total		302	26	19	4	40	4	36	5	12	0	409	39
Career total			306	26	20	4	40	4	36	5	12	0	414	39

^{1}Includes Japanese Super Cup, J. League Championship and FIFA Club World Cup.

== Honours ==
=== Club ===
Urawa Red Diamonds

- Emperor's Cup: 2021
- Japanese Super Cup: 2022
- AFC Champions League: 2017, 2022
