= Hiroto Nakagawa (footballer, born 1994) =

Japanese footballer

Hiroto Nakagawa 中川寛斗
Personal information
- Full name: Hiroto Nakagawa
- Date of birth: 3 November 1994 (age 31)
- Place of birth: Urawa-ku, Saitama, Japan
- Height: 1.55 m (5 ft 1 in)
- Position: Striker

Team information
- Current team: Oita Trinita
- Number: 5

Youth career
- 2004–2012: Kashiwa Reysol

Senior career*
Years	Team	Apps	(Gls)
2013–2019	Kashiwa Reysol	63	(7)
2013–2014	→ Shonan Bellmare (loan)	10	(0)
2014–2015	→ J.League U-22 (loan)	4	(0)
2019	→ Shonan Bellmare (loan)	10	(0)
2020	Shonan Bellmare	19	(3)
2021	Kyoto Sanga	11	(0)
2022–	Oita Trinita	96	(8)

International career
	Japan U-18	5	(4)
	Japan U-19	3	(2)
- * Club domestic league appearances and goals as of 16 August 2026

Hiroto Nakagawa (中川 寛斗, Nakagawa Hiroto; born 3 November 1994) is a Japanese footballer who plays as a midfielder for J2 League club Oita Trinita.

== Club statistics ==
As of 25 October 2023.

Appearances and goals by club, season and competition
Club	Season	League			Emperor's Cup		J.League Cup		AFC		Other		Total	
Club	Season	Division	Apps	Goals	Apps	Goals	Apps	Goals	Apps	Goals	Apps	Goals	Apps	Goals
Shonan Bellmare (loan)	2013	J1 League	7	0	1	0	2	0	-		-		10	0
Shonan Bellmare (loan)	2014	J2 League	3	0	1	0	-		-		-		4	0
Shonan Bellmare (loan)	Total		10	0	2	0	2	0	0	0	0	0	14	0
J.League U-22 Selection (loan)	2014	J3 League	3	0	0	0	-		-		-		3	0
J.League U-22 Selection (loan)	2015	J3 League	1	0	0	0	-		-		-		1	0
J.League U-22 Selection (loan)	Total		4	0	0	0	0	0	0	0	0	0	4	0
Kashiwa Reysol	2015	J1 League	5	1	1	0	1	0	1	0	-		8	1
Kashiwa Reysol	2016	J1 League	22	1	2	0	5	1	-		-		29	2
Kashiwa Reysol	2017	J1 League	22	3	4	0	2	0	-		-		28	3
Kashiwa Reysol	2018	J1 League	14	2	0	0	4	1	2	0	-		20	3
Kashiwa Reysol	Total		63	7	7	0	12	2	3	0	0	0	85	9
Shonan Bellmare (loan)	2019	J1 League	10	0	0	0	5	0	-		1 (Note: Appearance in J1/J2 play-offs)	0	16	0
Shonan Bellmare	2020	J1 League	19	3	0	0	2	0	-		-		21	3
Kyoto Sanga	2021	J2 League	11	0	2	0	-		-		-		13	0
Oita Trinita	2022	J2 League	20	4	2	0	5	0	-		1	0	28	4
Oita Trinita	2023	J2 League	27	4	1	0	-		-		-		28	4
Oita Trinita	Total		47	8	3	0	5	0	0	0	0	0	56	8
Career total			164	18	14	0	26	2	3	0	2	0	209	20
