= 2015 J1 League =

23rd season of J1 League

Meiji Yasuda J1 League
- Season: 2015
- Champions: Sanfrecce Hiroshima; 3rd J.League title 8th Japanese title
- Relegated: Matsumoto Yamaga; Montedio Yamagata; Shimizu S-Pulse
- Champions League: Sanfrecce Hiroshima; Urawa Red Diamonds; Gamba Osaka; FC Tokyo
- Club World Cup: Sanfrecce Hiroshima
- Matches: 306
- Goals: 820 (2.68 per match)
- Top goalscorer: Yoshito Ōkubo (23 goals)
- Highest attendance: 53,148 Urawa Red Diamonds vs Gamba Osaka (2 May)
- Lowest attendance: 6,100 Montedio Yamagata vs Nagoya Grampus (29 July)
- Average attendance: 17,803
- All statistics correct as of 22 November 2015.

The 2015 Meiji Yasuda J1 League (2015 明治安田生命J1リーグ) season was the 50th season of top-flight football in Japan and the 23rd since the establishment of the J.League in 1992. This was first season of J1 League as renamed from J. League Division 1.

For a five-year period starting in 2015, the J.League changed to a newly conceived multistage system, with the year split into two halves and a third and final championship stage. The winners of the first and second stages and the highest ranking club of the aggregate table (other than the first or second stage winners) will qualify for the Championship Stage. Sanfrecce Hiroshima won the Championship Stage and advanced to the 2015 FIFA Club World Cup as the host nation's entrant.

== Clubs ==
Locations of the 2015 J1 League teams

| Club name | Home town(s) | Stadium | Capacity | Note(s) |
|---|---|---|---|---|
| Albirex Niigata | Niigata & Seirō, Niigata | Denka Big Swan Stadium | 42,300 | |
| FC Tokyo | Tokyo | Ajinomoto Stadium | 49,970 | |
| Gamba Osaka | Suita, Osaka | Expo '70 Commemorative Stadium | 21,000 | 2015 AFC Champions League participant (as 2014 J.League Division 1 winners) |
| Kashima Antlers | Kashima, Ibaraki | Kashima Soccer Stadium | 40,728 | 2015 AFC Champions League participant (as 2014 J.League Division 1 third-placed team) |
| Kashiwa Reysol | Kashiwa, Chiba | Kashiwa Soccer Stadium | 15,900 | 2015 AFC Champions League play-off participant (as 2014 J.League Division 1 fourth-placed team) |
| Kawasaki Frontale | Kawasaki, Kanagawa | Todoroki Athletics Stadium | 26,232 | |
| Matsumoto Yamaga | Matsumoto, Nagano | Matsumotodaira Football Stadium | 20,000 | Promoted from J.League Division 2 in 2014 (as runners-up) |
| Montedio Yamagata | All cities/towns in Yamagata | ND Soft Stadium | 20,315 | Promoted from J.League Division 2 in 2014 (through a play-off system) |
| Nagoya Grampus | Nagoya, Aichi | Paloma Mizuho Stadium | 27,000 | |
| Sagan Tosu | Tosu, Saga | Tosu Stadium | 24,490 | |
| Sanfrecce Hiroshima | Hiroshima | Hiroshima Big Arch | 50,000 | |
| Shimizu S-Pulse | Shizuoka | IAI Stadium Nihondaira | 20,339 | |
| Shonan Bellmare | Hiratsuka, Kanagawa | Shonan Stadium Hiratsuka | 18,500 | Promoted from J.League Division 2 in 2014 (as winners) |
| Urawa Red Diamonds | Saitama | Saitama Stadium | 63,700 | 2015 AFC Champions League participant (as 2014 J.League Division 1 runners-up) |
| Vegalta Sendai | Sendai, Miyagi | Yurtec Stadium | 19,694 | |
| Ventforet Kofu | Kōfu, Yamanashi | Yamanashi Chuo Bank Stadium | 17,000 | |
| Vissel Kobe | Kobe, Hyōgo | Misaki Park Stadium | 30,132 | |
| Yokohama F. Marinos | Yokohama & Yokosuka | Nissan Stadium | 72,327 | |

=== Personnel and kits ===
| Club name | Head coach | Kit manufacturer | Front shirt sponsor |
|---|---|---|---|
| Albirex Niigata | (Japan) Masaaki Yanagishita | Adidas | Kameda Seika |
| FC Tokyo | (Italy) Massimo Ficcadenti | Umbro | Lifeval |
| Gamba Osaka | (Japan) Kenta Hasegawa | Umbro | Panasonic |
| Kashima Antlers | (Japan) Masatada Ishii | Nike | Lixil |
| Kashiwa Reysol | (Japan) Tatsuma Yoshida | Yonex | Hitachi |
| Kawasaki Frontale | (Japan) Yahiro Kazama | Puma | Fujitsu (home); Arrows (away) |
| Matsumoto Yamaga | (Japan) Yasuharu Sorimachi | Adidas | Epson |
| Montedio Yamagata | (Japan) Nobuhiro Ishizaki | New Balance | ABeam Consulting |
| Nagoya Grampus | (Japan) Akira Nishino | Le Coq Sportif | Toyota |
| Sagan Tosu | (Japan) Hitoshi Morishita | New Balance | DHC |
| Sanfrecce Hiroshima | (Japan) Hajime Moriyasu | Nike | EDION |
| Shimizu S-Pulse | (Japan) Kazuaki Tasaka | Puma | Suzuyo |
| Shonan Bellmare | (South Korea) Cho Kwi-jae | Penalty | ENERES |
| Urawa Red Diamonds | (Serbia) Mihailo Petrović | Nike | Polus |
| Vegalta Sendai | (Japan) Susumu Watanabe | Adidas | Iris Ohyama |
| Ventforet Kofu | (Japan) Satoru Sakuma | Mizuno | Hakubaku |
| Vissel Kobe | (Brazil) Nelsinho Baptista | Asics | Rakuten |
| Yokohama F. Marinos | (France) Erick Mombaerts | Adidas | Nissan |

=== Managerial changes ===
| Team | Outgoing manager | Date of separation | Manner of departure | Incoming manager | Date of announcement |
|---|---|---|---|---|---|
| Ventforet Kofu | (Japan) Yasuhiro Higuchi | 13 May | Mutual consent | (Japan) Satoru Sakuma | 13 May |
| Kashima Antlers | (Brazil) Toninho Cerezo | 21 July | Sacked | (Japan) Masatada Ishii | 21 July |
| Shimizu S-Pulse | (Japan) Katsumi Oenoki | 1 August | Resigned | (Japan) Kazuaki Tasaka | 11 August |

=== Foreign players ===
| Club | Player 1 | Player 2 | Player 3 | AFC player | Non-visa foreign | Type-C contract | Former players |
|---|---|---|---|---|---|---|---|
| Albirex Niigata | (Brazil) Bruno Cortez | (Brazil) Léo Silva | (Brazil) Rafael Silva | (South Korea) Lim You-hwan | | | (Brazil) Rafael Ratão |
| FC Tokyo | (Serbia) Vlada Avramov | (Spain) Francisco Sandaza | | (Australia) Nathan Burns | | | (Italy) Michele Canini (Tunisia) Lassad Nouioui |
| Gamba Osaka | (Brazil) Lins | (Brazil) Patric | | (South Korea) Oh Jae-suk | (South Korea) Kim Jung-ya | | |
| Kashima Antlers | (Brazil) Davi | (Brazil) Dinei | | (South Korea) Hwang Seok-ho | (Brazil) Caio | | |
| Kashiwa Reysol | (Brazil) Cristiano | (Brazil) Dudu | (Brazil) Éderson | (South Korea) Kim Chang-soo | | | (Brazil) Leandro |
| Kawasaki Frontale | (Brazil) Arthur Maia | (Brazil) Elsinho | | | | | (Brazil) Renatinho (North Korea) An Byong-jun |
| Matsumoto Yamaga | (Brazil) Eric | (Brazil) Obina | (Brazil) Willians | (South Korea) Kim Bo-kyung | | | (Brazil) Doriva |
| Montedio Yamagata | (Brazil) Alceu | (Brazil) Diego Souza | | (South Korea) Kim Byeom-yong | (Peru) Frank Romero | | |
| Nagoya Grampus | (Brazil) Leandro Domingues | (Colombia) Danilson Córdoba | (Slovenia) Milivoje Novaković | | | (Brazil) Gustavo | |
| Sagan Tosu | (South Korea) Baek Sung-dong | (South Korea) Choi Sung-keun | (South Korea) Kim Min-hyeok | (South Korea) Kim Min-woo | | | |
| Sanfrecce Hiroshima | (Brazil) Douglas | (Croatia) Mihael Mikić | | (South Korea) Byeon Jun-byum | | | |
| Shimizu S-Pulse | (Canada) Dejan Jaković | (Netherlands) Calvin Jong-a-Pin | (Nigeria) Peter Utaka | (Australia) Mitch Duke | (North Korea) Jong Tae-se | | |
| Shonan Bellmare | (Brazil) André Bahia | (Brazil) Thiago Quirino | (South Korea) Kim Jong-pil | (South Korea) Lee Ho-seung | | (Brazil) Alison | (Brazil) Bruno Correa (Brazil) Fábio Amorim (Portugal) Guima |
| Urawa Red Diamonds | (Slovenia) Zlatan Ljubijankić | | | | | | |
| Vegalta Sendai | (Brazil) Felipe | (Brazil) Ramon Lopes | (Brazil) Wilson | (South Korea) Kim Min-tae | (North Korea) Ryang Yong-gi | | (United States) Daniel Schmidt |
| Ventforet Kofu | (Brazil) Baré | (Brazil) Maranhão | (Brazil) Marquinhos Paraná | | | | (Brazil) Adriano (Brazil) Bruno Dybal (Brazil) William Henrique |
| Vissel Kobe | (Brazil) Leandro | (Brazil) Marquinhos | (Brazil) Pedro Júnior | (South Korea) Jung Woo-young | (Brazil) Bueno | | (Brazil) Ferrugem |
| Yokohama F. Marinos | (Brazil) Ademilson | (Brazil) Fábio | (Brazil) Rafinha | | | | |

== Format changes ==
Teams play a single round-robin in the first stage and a single round-robin in the second stage. After that an overall table is calculated and a championship stage is played. The winners of the first and second stages and any team that finishes in the top 3 of the overall rankings advance to the championship stage. The team that finishes atop the overall table automatically qualifies for the final, while the remaining teams play-off for the other spot in the final.

=== League table ===
==== First stage ====
| Pos | Team | Pld | W | D | L | GF | GA | GD | Pts | Qualification |
|---|---|---|---|---|---|---|---|---|---|---|
| 1 | Urawa Red Diamonds (Q) | 17 | 12 | 5 | 0 | 39 | 17 | +22 | 41 | Qualification to J.League Championship Stage |
| 2 | FC Tokyo | 17 | 11 | 2 | 4 | 24 | 18 | +6 | 35 | |
| 3 | Sanfrecce Hiroshima | 17 | 10 | 4 | 3 | 29 | 16 | +13 | 34 | |
| 4 | Gamba Osaka | 17 | 9 | 5 | 3 | 24 | 13 | +11 | 32 | |
| 5 | Kawasaki Frontale | 17 | 9 | 3 | 5 | 32 | 26 | +6 | 30 | |
| 6 | Yokohama F. Marinos | 17 | 7 | 5 | 5 | 21 | 17 | +4 | 26 | |
| 7 | Vegalta Sendai | 17 | 6 | 5 | 6 | 27 | 20 | +7 | 23 | |
| 8 | Kashima Antlers | 17 | 6 | 4 | 7 | 27 | 25 | +2 | 22 | |
| 9 | Nagoya Grampus | 17 | 6 | 4 | 7 | 18 | 18 | 0 | 22 | |
| 10 | Shonan Bellmare | 17 | 6 | 4 | 7 | 20 | 24 | −4 | 22 | |
| 11 | Sagan Tosu | 17 | 5 | 5 | 7 | 22 | 32 | −10 | 20 | |
| 12 | Ventforet Kofu | 17 | 6 | 2 | 9 | 12 | 22 | −10 | 20 | |
| 13 | Vissel Kobe | 17 | 4 | 7 | 6 | 17 | 19 | −2 | 19 | |
| 14 | Kashiwa Reysol | 17 | 4 | 6 | 7 | 22 | 25 | −3 | 18 | |
| 15 | Matsumoto Yamaga | 17 | 4 | 3 | 10 | 17 | 26 | −9 | 15 | |
| 16 | Montedio Yamagata | 17 | 3 | 5 | 9 | 14 | 24 | −10 | 14 | |
| 17 | Albirex Niigata | 17 | 3 | 5 | 9 | 20 | 33 | −13 | 14 | |
| 18 | Shimizu S-Pulse | 17 | 3 | 4 | 10 | 22 | 32 | −10 | 13 | |

Updated to match(es) played on 27 June 2015. Source: Meiji Yasuda J1 League Standings
Rules for classification: 1) Points; 2) Goal difference; 3) Goals scored
(Q) Qualified for the phase indicated

==== Second stage ====
| Pos | Team | Pld | W | D | L | GF | GA | GD | Pts | Qualification |
|---|---|---|---|---|---|---|---|---|---|---|
| 1 | Sanfrecce Hiroshima (Q) | 17 | 13 | 1 | 3 | 44 | 14 | +30 | 40 | Qualification to J.League Championship Stage |
| 2 | Kashima Antlers | 17 | 12 | 1 | 4 | 30 | 16 | +14 | 37 | |
| 3 | Gamba Osaka | 17 | 9 | 4 | 4 | 32 | 24 | +8 | 31 | |
| 4 | Urawa Red Diamonds | 17 | 9 | 4 | 4 | 30 | 23 | +7 | 31 | |
| 5 | Yokohama F. Marinos | 17 | 8 | 5 | 4 | 24 | 15 | +9 | 29 | |
| 6 | FC Tokyo | 17 | 8 | 4 | 5 | 21 | 15 | +6 | 28 | |
| 7 | Kawasaki Frontale | 17 | 8 | 3 | 6 | 30 | 22 | +8 | 27 | |
| 8 | Kashiwa Reysol | 17 | 8 | 3 | 6 | 24 | 18 | +6 | 27 | |
| 9 | Shonan Bellmare | 17 | 7 | 5 | 5 | 20 | 20 | 0 | 26 | |
| 10 | Nagoya Grampus | 17 | 7 | 3 | 7 | 26 | 30 | −4 | 24 | |
| 11 | Albirex Niigata | 17 | 5 | 5 | 7 | 21 | 25 | −4 | 20 | |
| 12 | Sagan Tosu | 17 | 4 | 8 | 5 | 15 | 22 | −7 | 20 | |
| 13 | Vissel Kobe | 17 | 6 | 1 | 10 | 27 | 30 | −3 | 19 | |
| 14 | Ventforet Kofu | 17 | 4 | 5 | 8 | 14 | 21 | −7 | 17 | |
| 15 | Matsumoto Yamaga | 17 | 3 | 4 | 10 | 13 | 28 | −15 | 13 | |
| 16 | Vegalta Sendai | 17 | 3 | 3 | 11 | 17 | 28 | −11 | 12 | |
| 17 | Shimizu S-Pulse | 17 | 2 | 6 | 9 | 15 | 33 | −18 | 12 | |
| 18 | Montedio Yamagata | 17 | 1 | 7 | 9 | 10 | 29 | −19 | 10 | |

Updated to match(es) played on 22 November 2015. Source: Meiji Yasuda J1 League 2nd Stage Standings
Rules for classification: 1) Points; 2) Goal difference; 3) Goals scored
(Q) Qualified for the phase indicated

==== Overall table ====
| Pos | Team | Pld | W | D | L | GF | GA | GD | Pts | Qualification or relegation |
|---|---|---|---|---|---|---|---|---|---|---|
| 1 | Sanfrecce Hiroshima (C) | 34 | 23 | 5 | 6 | 73 | 30 | +43 | 74 | Club World Cup, Champions League group stage and J.League Championship Final |
| 2 | Urawa Red Diamonds | 34 | 21 | 9 | 4 | 69 | 40 | +29 | 72 | Champions League group stage and J.League Championship 1st Round |
| 3 | Gamba Osaka | 34 | 18 | 9 | 7 | 56 | 37 | +19 | 63 | Champions League group stage and J.League Championship 1st Round |
| 4 | FC Tokyo | 34 | 19 | 6 | 9 | 45 | 33 | +12 | 63 | Champions League qualifying play-off (Note: The winner of the 2015 Emperor's Cup qualified for the group stage of the 2016 AFC Champions League. Since the Emperor's Cup winner was Gamba Osaka who were the third-placed team, the qualifying play-off spot was awarded to the fourth-placed team.) |
| 5 | Kashima Antlers | 34 | 18 | 5 | 11 | 57 | 41 | +16 | 59 | |
| 6 | Kawasaki Frontale | 34 | 17 | 6 | 11 | 62 | 48 | +14 | 57 | |
| 7 | Yokohama F. Marinos | 34 | 15 | 10 | 9 | 45 | 32 | +13 | 55 | |
| 8 | Shonan Bellmare | 34 | 13 | 9 | 12 | 40 | 44 | −4 | 48 | |
| 9 | Nagoya Grampus | 34 | 13 | 7 | 14 | 44 | 48 | −4 | 46 | |
| 10 | Kashiwa Reysol | 34 | 12 | 9 | 13 | 46 | 43 | +3 | 45 | |
| 11 | Sagan Tosu | 34 | 9 | 13 | 12 | 37 | 54 | −17 | 40 | |
| 12 | Vissel Kobe | 34 | 10 | 8 | 16 | 44 | 49 | −5 | 38 | |
| 13 | Ventforet Kofu | 34 | 10 | 7 | 17 | 26 | 43 | −17 | 37 | |
| 14 | Vegalta Sendai | 34 | 9 | 8 | 17 | 44 | 48 | −4 | 35 | |
| 15 | Albirex Niigata | 34 | 8 | 10 | 16 | 41 | 58 | −17 | 34 | |
| 16 | Matsumoto Yamaga (R) | 34 | 7 | 7 | 20 | 30 | 54 | −24 | 28 | Relegation to 2016 J2 League |
| 17 | Shimizu S-Pulse (R) | 34 | 5 | 10 | 19 | 37 | 65 | −28 | 25 | Relegation to 2016 J2 League |
| 18 | Montedio Yamagata (R) | 34 | 4 | 12 | 18 | 24 | 53 | −29 | 24 | Relegation to 2016 J2 League |

Updated to match(es) played on 28 November 2015. Source: Meiji Yasuda J1 League Standings
Rules for classification: 1) Points; 2) Goal difference; 3) Goals scored
(C) Champions; (R) Relegated

== Positions by round ==
=== First stage ===
| Team ╲ Round | 1 | 2 | 3 | 4 | 5 | 6 | 7 | 8 | 9 | 10 | 11 | 12 | 13 | 14 | 15 | 16 | 17 |
|---|---|---|---|---|---|---|---|---|---|---|---|---|---|---|---|---|---|
| Urawa Red Diamonds | 1 | 1 | 1 | 1 | 1 | 1 | 1 | 1 | 1 | 1 | 1 | 1 | 1 | 1 | 1 | 1 | 1 |
| FC Tokyo | 10 | 10 | 4 | 2 | 1 | 5 | 4 | 3 | 2 | 2 | 2 | 4 | 5 | 3 | 3 | 3 | 2 |
| Sanfrecce Hiroshima | 4 | 1 | 1 | 6 | 10 | 6 | 6 | 4 | 4 | 3 | 4 | 3 | 2 | 2 | 2 | 2 | 3 |
| Gamba Osaka | 10 | 13 | 7 | 5 | 3 | 2 | 2 | 2 | 3 | 4 | 3 | 2 | 3 | 4 | 4 | 4 | 4 |
| Kawasaki Frontale | 1 | 4 | 6 | 4 | 6 | 4 | 3 | 5 | 5 | 6 | 5 | 7 | 6 | 6 | 6 | 5 | 5 |
| Yokohama F. Marinos | 14 | 16 | 13 | 8 | 7 | 11 | 8 | 11 | 11 | 8 | 6 | 5 | 4 | 5 | 5 | 6 | 6 |
| Vegalta Sendai | 4 | 5 | 5 | 2 | 4 | 7 | 9 | 13 | 13 | 15 | 15 | 12 | 13 | 11 | 7 | 9 | 7 |
| Kashima Antlers | 14 | 17 | 17 | 11 | 12 | 8 | 10 | 8 | 10 | 11 | 9 | 8 | 11 | 9 | 9 | 7 | 8 |
| Nagoya Grampus | 8 | 12 | 16 | 18 | 12 | 8 | 11 | 9 | 6 | 7 | 8 | 11 | 9 | 10 | 8 | 8 | 9 |
| Shonan Bellmare | 14 | 8 | 12 | 7 | 11 | 13 | 14 | 12 | 12 | 13 | 10 | 10 | 8 | 7 | 10 | 10 | 10 |
| Sagan Tosu | 6 | 3 | 3 | 9 | 5 | 3 | 5 | 6 | 7 | 5 | 7 | 6 | 7 | 8 | 11 | 11 | 11 |
| Ventforet Kofu | 17 | 9 | 15 | 17 | 18 | 18 | 18 | 18 | 18 | 18 | 18 | 18 | 16 | 14 | 13 | 12 | 12 |
| Vissel Kobe | 13 | 13 | 18 | 14 | 9 | 10 | 7 | 10 | 9 | 9 | 11 | 14 | 10 | 12 | 12 | 13 | 13 |
| Kashiwa Reysol | 7 | 7 | 10 | 12 | 8 | 12 | 12 | 7 | 8 | 10 | 12 | 13 | 14 | 15 | 15 | 15 | 14 |
| Matsumoto Yamaga | 8 | 11 | 9 | 12 | 16 | 15 | 13 | 14 | 15 | 12 | 14 | 9 | 12 | 13 | 14 | 14 | 15 |
| Montedio Yamagata | 17 | 18 | 14 | 16 | 17 | 17 | 17 | 17 | 16 | 16 | 13 | 15 | 15 | 16 | 16 | 16 | 16 |
| Albirex Niigata | 12 | 15 | 10 | 15 | 14 | 14 | 15 | 15 | 14 | 14 | 17 | 17 | 18 | 18 | 18 | 17 | 17 |
| Shimizu S-Pulse | 1 | 5 | 8 | 10 | 15 | 16 | 16 | 16 | 17 | 17 | 16 | 16 | 17 | 17 | 17 | 18 | 18 |

| Leader and qualification to 2015 J.League Championship |

Updated to match(es) played on 27 June 2015. Source: J. League data site
Note 1: Matchday 10 results for 2015 AFC Champions League Participants (Kashiwa Reysol vs. Urawa Red Diamonds; Gamba Osaka vs. Kashima Antlers), held on 3 June 2015, are included in Matchday 15 ranking.
Note 2: Matchday 13 results for 2015 AFC Champions League quarterfinalists (Kashiwa Reysol vs. Gamba Osaka), held on 23 June 2015, are included in Matchday 17 ranking.

=== Second stage ===
| Team ╲ Round | 1 | 2 | 3 | 4 | 5 | 6 | 7 | 8 | 9 | 10 | 11 | 12 | 13 | 14 | 15 | 16 | 17 |
|---|---|---|---|---|---|---|---|---|---|---|---|---|---|---|---|---|---|
| Sanfrecce Hiroshima | 3 | 1 | 1 | 1 | 1 | 1 | 2 | 2 | 2 | 1 | 1 | 1 | 1 | 1 | 1 | 1 | 1 |
| Kashima Antlers | 4 | 5 | 11 | 7 | 4 | 2 | 1 | 1 | 1 | 2 | 2 | 2 | 2 | 2 | 2 | 2 | 2 |
| Gamba Osaka | 6 | 8 | 6 | 3 | 5 | 8 | 10 | 8 | 5 | 5 | 5 | 4 | 8 | 4 | 4 | 4 | 3 |
| Urawa Red Diamonds | 6 | 7 | 9 | 13 | 14 | 9 | 8 | 4 | 9 | 6 | 4 | 3 | 4 | 6 | 5 | 5 | 4 |
| Yokohama F. Marinos | 9 | 14 | 16 | 16 | 17 | 14 | 12 | 9 | 6 | 7 | 6 | 8 | 7 | 3 | 3 | 3 | 5 |
| FC Tokyo | 17 | 10 | 9 | 13 | 9 | 6 | 4 | 6 | 4 | 4 | 7 | 5 | 3 | 5 | 7 | 6 | 6 |
| Kawasaki Frontale | 2 | 3 | 4 | 5 | 3 | 4 | 6 | 10 | 11 | 9 | 8 | 6 | 5 | 7 | 8 | 9 | 7 |
| Kashiwa Reysol | 12 | 10 | 3 | 2 | 6 | 3 | 3 | 3 | 3 | 3 | 3 | 7 | 6 | 8 | 6 | 7 | 8 |
| Shonan Bellmare | 6 | 5 | 11 | 11 | 7 | 5 | 6 | 4 | 7 | 8 | 9 | 9 | 9 | 9 | 9 | 8 | 9 |
| Nagoya Grampus | 14 | 8 | 6 | 6 | 2 | 7 | 5 | 7 | 8 | 10 | 11 | 10 | 10 | 11 | 10 | 10 | 10 |
| Albirex Niigata | 12 | 17 | 14 | 8 | 10 | 10 | 13 | 14 | 12 | 12 | 10 | 11 | 11 | 10 | 11 | 12 | 11 |
| Sagan Tosu | 4 | 4 | 8 | 9 | 11 | 12 | 11 | 12 | 14 | 13 | 13 | 14 | 14 | 14 | 14 | 13 | 12 |
| Vissel Kobe | 1 | 2 | 2 | 4 | 8 | 11 | 9 | 11 | 10 | 11 | 12 | 12 | 12 | 13 | 12 | 11 | 13 |
| Ventforet Kofu | 14 | 14 | 4 | 12 | 13 | 15 | 16 | 13 | 13 | 14 | 14 | 13 | 13 | 12 | 13 | 14 | 14 |
| Matsumoto Yamaga | 14 | 18 | 15 | 10 | 12 | 13 | 15 | 16 | 16 | 17 | 17 | 16 | 15 | 16 | 16 | 16 | 15 |
| Vegalta Sendai | 11 | 13 | 18 | 18 | 18 | 17 | 17 | 17 | 17 | 16 | 15 | 15 | 17 | 15 | 15 | 15 | 16 |
| Shimizu S-Pulse | 18 | 16 | 17 | 17 | 15 | 16 | 14 | 15 | 15 | 15 | 16 | 17 | 18 | 18 | 18 | 17 | 17 |
| Montedio Yamagata | 9 | 12 | 13 | 15 | 16 | 18 | 18 | 18 | 18 | 18 | 18 | 18 | 16 | 17 | 17 | 18 | 18 |

| Leader and qualification to 2015 J.League Championship |

Updated to match(es) played on 22 November 2015. Source: J. League data site
Note 1: Matchday 6 results for Gamba Osaka vs. Sagan Tosu, held on 22 July 2015, are included in Matchday 4 ranking. Gamba Osaka is a finalist in 2015 Suruga Bank Championship, scheduled on 11 August 2015.
Note 2: Matchday 9 results for Matsumoto Yamaga vs. Montedio Yamagata, held on 23 September 2015, are included on Matchday 12 ranking.

=== Overall ===
| Team ╲ Round | 1 | 2 | 3 | 4 | 5 | 6 | 7 | 8 | 9 | 10 | 11 | 12 | 13 | 14 | 15 | 16 | 17 | 18 | 19 | 20 | 21 | 22 | 23 | 24 | 25 | 26 | 27 | 28 | 29 | 30 | 31 | 32 | 33 | 34 |
|---|---|---|---|---|---|---|---|---|---|---|---|---|---|---|---|---|---|---|---|---|---|---|---|---|---|---|---|---|---|---|---|---|---|---|
| Sanfrecce Hiroshima | 4 | 1 | 1 | 6 | 10 | 6 | 6 | 4 | 4 | 3 | 4 | 3 | 2 | 2 | 2 | 2 | 3 | 2 | 2 | 2 | 1 | 1 | 1 | 2 | 2 | 1 | 1 | 2 | 2 | 2 | 1 | 1 | 1 | 1 |
| Urawa Red Diamonds | 1 | 1 | 1 | 1 | 1 | 1 | 1 | 1 | 1 | 1 | 1 | 1 | 1 | 1 | 1 | 1 | 1 | 1 | 1 | 1 | 2 | 2 | 2 | 1 | 1 | 2 | 2 | 1 | 1 | 1 | 2 | 2 | 2 | 2 |
| Gamba Osaka | 10 | 13 | 7 | 5 | 3 | 2 | 2 | 2 | 3 | 4 | 3 | 2 | 3 | 4 | 4 | 4 | 4 | 3 | 4 | 4 | 3 | 4 | 4 | 4 | 4 | 4 | 4 | 4 | 4 | 4 | 4 | 3 | 4 | 3 |
| FC Tokyo | 10 | 10 | 4 | 2 | 1 | 5 | 4 | 3 | 2 | 2 | 2 | 4 | 5 | 3 | 3 | 3 | 2 | 4 | 3 | 3 | 4 | 3 | 3 | 3 | 3 | 3 | 3 | 3 | 3 | 3 | 3 | 4 | 3 | 4 |
| Kashima Antlers | 14 | 17 | 17 | 11 | 12 | 8 | 10 | 8 | 10 | 11 | 9 | 8 | 11 | 9 | 9 | 7 | 8 | 7 | 7 | 8 | 6 | 6 | 6 | 6 | 5 | 5 | 5 | 6 | 6 | 6 | 6 | 7 | 5 | 5 |
| Kawasaki Frontale | 1 | 4 | 6 | 4 | 6 | 4 | 3 | 5 | 5 | 6 | 5 | 7 | 6 | 6 | 6 | 5 | 5 | 5 | 5 | 5 | 5 | 5 | 5 | 5 | 6 | 6 | 6 | 5 | 5 | 5 | 5 | 6 | 6 | 6 |
| Yokohama F. Marinos | 14 | 16 | 13 | 8 | 7 | 11 | 8 | 11 | 11 | 8 | 6 | 5 | 4 | 5 | 5 | 6 | 6 | 6 | 6 | 6 | 8 | 9 | 9 | 8 | 7 | 7 | 7 | 7 | 7 | 7 | 7 | 5 | 7 | 7 |
| Shonan Bellmare | 14 | 8 | 12 | 7 | 11 | 13 | 14 | 12 | 12 | 13 | 10 | 10 | 8 | 7 | 10 | 10 | 10 | 8 | 8 | 10 | 10 | 8 | 7 | 10 | 10 | 10 | 9 | 9 | 8 | 9 | 8 | 8 | 8 | 8 |
| Nagoya Grampus | 8 | 12 | 16 | 18 | 12 | 8 | 11 | 9 | 6 | 7 | 8 | 11 | 9 | 10 | 8 | 8 | 9 | 12 | 9 | 9 | 7 | 7 | 8 | 7 | 9 | 9 | 10 | 10 | 9 | 10 | 10 | 10 | 9 | 9 |
| Kashiwa Reysol | 7 | 7 | 10 | 12 | 8 | 12 | 12 | 7 | 8 | 10 | 12 | 13 | 14 | 15 | 15 | 15 | 14 | 14 | 13 | 12 | 9 | 10 | 10 | 9 | 8 | 8 | 8 | 8 | 10 | 8 | 9 | 9 | 10 | 10 |
| Sagan Tosu | 6 | 3 | 3 | 9 | 5 | 3 | 5 | 6 | 7 | 5 | 7 | 6 | 7 | 8 | 11 | 11 | 11 | 10 | 11 | 14 | 12 | 12 | 13 | 12 | 12 | 13 | 13 | 13 | 14 | 14 | 14 | 12 | 11 | 11 |
| Vissel Kobe | 13 | 13 | 18 | 14 | 9 | 10 | 7 | 10 | 9 | 9 | 11 | 14 | 10 | 12 | 12 | 13 | 13 | 11 | 12 | 7 | 11 | 11 | 12 | 11 | 11 | 11 | 11 | 11 | 12 | 13 | 15 | 14 | 12 | 12 |
| Ventforet Kofu | 17 | 9 | 15 | 17 | 18 | 18 | 18 | 18 | 18 | 18 | 18 | 18 | 16 | 14 | 13 | 12 | 12 | 13 | 14 | 13 | 14 | 13 | 14 | 14 | 13 | 12 | 14 | 15 | 13 | 11 | 11 | 11 | 13 | 13 |
| Vegalta Sendai | 4 | 5 | 5 | 2 | 4 | 7 | 9 | 13 | 13 | 15 | 15 | 12 | 13 | 11 | 7 | 9 | 7 | 9 | 10 | 11 | 13 | 14 | 11 | 13 | 14 | 14 | 12 | 12 | 11 | 12 | 12 | 13 | 14 | 14 |
| Albirex Niigata | 12 | 15 | 10 | 15 | 14 | 14 | 15 | 15 | 14 | 14 | 17 | 17 | 18 | 18 | 18 | 17 | 17 | 17 | 18 | 17 | 16 | 15 | 15 | 15 | 15 | 15 | 15 | 14 | 15 | 15 | 13 | 15 | 15 | 15 |
| Matsumoto Yamaga | 8 | 11 | 9 | 12 | 16 | 15 | 13 | 14 | 15 | 12 | 14 | 9 | 12 | 13 | 14 | 14 | 15 | 15 | 16 | 15 | 15 | 16 | 16 | 16 | 16 | 16 | 16 | 16 | 16 | 16 | 16 | 16 | 16 | 16 |
| Shimizu S-Pulse | 1 | 5 | 8 | 10 | 15 | 16 | 16 | 16 | 17 | 17 | 16 | 16 | 17 | 17 | 17 | 18 | 18 | 18 | 17 | 18 | 18 | 17 | 18 | 17 | 17 | 17 | 17 | 17 | 18 | 18 | 18 | 18 | 18 | 17 |
| Montedio Yamagata | 17 | 18 | 14 | 16 | 17 | 17 | 17 | 17 | 16 | 16 | 13 | 15 | 15 | 16 | 16 | 16 | 16 | 16 | 15 | 16 | 17 | 18 | 17 | 18 | 18 | 18 | 18 | 18 | 17 | 17 | 17 | 17 | 17 | 18 |

| Leader, qualification to 2015 J.League Championship Final and 2016 AFC Champions League group stage |
| Qualification to 2015 J.League Championship 1st Round and 2015 AFC Champions League group stage / qualifying play-off |
| Relegation to 2016 J2 League |

Updated to match(es) played on 22 November 2015. Source: J. League data site
Note 1: Matchday 10 results for 2015 AFC Champions League Participants (Kashiwa Reysol vs. Urawa Red Diamonds; Gamba Osaka vs. Kashima Antlers), held on 3 June 2015, are included in Matchday 15 ranking.
Note 2: Matchday 13 results for 2015 AFC Champions League quarterfinalists (Kashiwa Reysol vs. Gamba Osaka), held on 23 June 2015, are included in Matchday 17 ranking.
Note 3: Matchday 23 results for Gamba Osaka vs. Sagan Tosu, held on 22 July 2015, are included in Matchday 21 ranking. Gamba Osaka is a finalist in 2015 Suruga Bank Championship, scheduled on 11 August 2015.
Note 4: Matchday 26 results for Matsumoto Yamaga vs. Montedio Yamagata, held on 23 September 2015, are included on Matchday 29 ranking.

== Championship stage ==
Meiji Yasuda 2015 J.League Championship (明治安田生命 2015 Jリーグチャンピオンシップ)
The Championship stage consisted of a knockout tournament involving the champions of the First and Second Stages, and any team that finishes in the top 3 of the overall table. The team with the best aggregate record earned a bye to the final. The remaining teams playoff for the other spot in the final.

| Semifinal | | | Final |
| | | | 1 | Sanfrecce Hiroshima | 3 | 1 | 4 |
| 2 | Urawa Red Diamonds | 1 | 3 | Gamba Osaka | 2 | 1 | 3 |
| 3 | Gamba Osaka (a.e.t.) | 3 |

28 November 2015
14:00

| Urawa Red Diamonds | 1–3 (a.e.t.) | Gamba Osaka |
|---|---|---|
| Ljubijankić 72' | Report | Konno 47'; Fujiharu 117'; Patric 120' |

Saitama Stadium 2002, Midori-ku, Saitama
Attendance: 40,696
Referee: Hajime Matsuo

2 December 2015
19:30

| Gamba Osaka | 2–3 | Sanfrecce Hiroshima |
|---|---|---|
| Nagasawa 60'; Konno 82' | Report | Douglas 80'; Sasaki 90+1'; Kashiwa 90+6' |

Osaka Expo '70 Stadium, Suita
Attendance: 17,844
Referee: Kenji Ogiya

5 December 2015
19:30

| Sanfrecce Hiroshima | 1–1 | Gamba Osaka |
|---|---|---|
| Asano 76' | Report | Konno 28' |

Hiroshima Big Arch, Hiroshima
Attendance: 36,609
Referee: Yuichi Nishimura

Sanfrecce Hiroshima won 4–3 on aggregate.

== Results ==
=== First stage ===
| Home \ Away | ALB | ANT | BEL | FMA | FRO | GAM | GRA | MON | RED | REY | SAG | SFR | SSP | TOK | VEG | VEN | VIS | YAM |
|---|---|---|---|---|---|---|---|---|---|---|---|---|---|---|---|---|---|---|
| Albirex Niigata | | | | | | | 1–1 | 1–1 | | 3–2 | | | 0–0 | 0–1 | 0–3 | 0–2 | 2–2 | |
| Kashima Antlers | 1–1 | | 1–2 | | 2–3 | | | | | | 3–1 | 2–2 | | | | 0–1 | 1–2 | 3–1 |
| Shonan Bellmare | 1–3 | | | | | 0–2 | | | 1–3 | | 4–2 | 0–0 | 4–0 | 0–1 | 0–0 | | 1–1 | |
| Yokohama F. Marinos | 1–0 | 0–3 | 3–0 | | 1–3 | 1–1 | 2–0 | | | | 1–0 | 1–2 | | | 1–1 | | | |
| Kawasaki Frontale | 4–1 | | 2–1 | | | | | | 1–1 | 1–4 | 3–2 | 0–1 | | | | 3–0 | 2–2 | 2–0 |
| Gamba Osaka | 2–1 | 2–0 | | | 1–1 | | 3–1 | | | | | | | 2–2 | 1–1 | | 0–0 | 1–0 |
| Nagoya Grampus | | 1–1 | 3–0 | | 0–1 | | | 0–0 | | 1–0 | 0–1 | 2–0 | 3–1 | | | | | 3–3 |
| Montedio Yamagata | | 2–2 | 1–2 | 1–0 | 1–0 | 1–3 | | | | 3–0 | | | | 0–1 | | | 0–1 | 0–0 |
| Urawa Red Diamonds | 5–2 | 2–1 | | 2–1 | | 1–0 | 2–1 | 1–0 | | | | | 1–0 | 4–1 | | | | 1–0 |
| Kashiwa Reysol | | 1–3 | 0–0 | 1–2 | | 1–0 | | | 3–3 | | | 2–3 | 0–0 | | 1–1 | | | |
| Sagan Tosu | 2–1 | | | | | 1–0 | | 1–0 | 1–6 | 1–1 | | 2–2 | | 1–2 | | | 1–1 | 1–1 |
| Sanfrecce Hiroshima | 4–2 | | | | | 0–1 | | 5–1 | 0–0 | | | | 2–0 | | 2–0 | 2–0 | 0–1 | |
| Shimizu S-Pulse | | 3–1 | | 1–2 | 5–2 | 2–3 | | 3–3 | | | 2–2 | | | | | 0–2 | | 0–1 |
| FC Tokyo | | 0–1 | | 0–0 | 2–1 | | 0–1 | | | 2–1 | | 1–2 | 3–2 | | | 1–0 | | |
| Vegalta Sendai | | 1–2 | | | 2–3 | | 2–0 | 2–0 | 4–4 | | 5–0 | | 2–1 | 2–3 | | 0–1 | | |
| Ventforet Kofu | | | 0–1 | 1–1 | | 0–2 | 1–0 | 2–0 | 0–2 | 1–1 | 0–3 | | | | | | | |
| Vissel Kobe | | | | 1–1 | | | 0–1 | | 1–1 | 0–1 | | | 1–2 | 0–2 | 0–1 | 4–1 | | |
| Matsumoto Yamaga | 1–2 | | 2–3 | 0–3 | | | | | | 3–0 | | 1–2 | | 0–1 | 1–0 | 2–0 | 2–0 | |

Updated to match(es) played on 27 June 2015. Source: J. League Data
Legend: Blue = home team win; Yellow = draw; Red = away team win.

=== Second stage ===
| Home \ Away | ALB | ANT | BEL | FMA | FRO | GAM | GRA | MON | RED | REY | SAG | SFR | SSP | TOK | VEG | VEN | VIS | YAM |
|---|---|---|---|---|---|---|---|---|---|---|---|---|---|---|---|---|---|---|
| Albirex Niigata | | 2–3 | 0–2 | 1–1 | 1–2 | 2–2 | | | 1–2 | | 1–0 | 0–2 | | | | | | 2–0 |
| Kashima Antlers | | | | 2–0 | | 1–2 | 1–0 | 3–0 | 1–2 | 3–2 | | | 0–0 | 2–1 | 3–2 | | | |
| Shonan Bellmare | | 2–1 | | 1–1 | 2–1 | | 2–1 | 0–1 | | 3–0 | | | | | | 0–2 | | 1–1 |
| Yokohama F. Marinos | | | | | | | | 1–1 | 4–0 | 0–1 | | | 1–2 | 1–0 | | 2–0 | 2–1 | 0–0 |
| Kawasaki Frontale | | 1–3 | | 0–1 | | 5–3 | 6–1 | 0–0 | | | | | 3–2 | 2–0 | 1–0 | | | |
| Gamba Osaka | | | 1–0 | 2–2 | | | | 4–0 | 2–1 | 3–1 | 1–1 | 0–2 | 1–0 | | | 2–1 | | |
| Nagoya Grampus | 4–2 | | | 0–3 | | 3–2 | | | 2–1 | | | | | 0–0 | 0–1 | 4–2 | 2–0 | |
| Montedio Yamagata | 1–3 | | | | | | 0–3 | | 0–0 | | 1–3 | 1–3 | 1–2 | | 1–1 | 0–1 | | |
| Urawa Red Diamonds | | | 1–0 | | 1–1 | | | | | 1–0 | 1–1 | 1–2 | | | 3–1 | 1–1 | 5–2 | |
| Kashiwa Reysol | 1–1 | | | | 1–0 | | 3–1 | 0–0 | | | 2–3 | | | 0–1 | | 2–2 | 2–0 | 2–0 |
| Sagan Tosu | | 0–3 | 1–1 | 1–2 | 1–1 | | 0–0 | | | | | | 0–0 | | 1–0 | 0–1 | | |
| Sanfrecce Hiroshima | | 0–1 | 5–0 | 2–0 | 2–1 | | 5–2 | | | 0–3 | 0–0 | | | 0–1 | | | | 6–0 |
| Shimizu S-Pulse | 1–1 | | 1–2 | | | | 2–2 | | 1–4 | 0–3 | | 1–5 | | 1–1 | 0–1 | | 0–5 | |
| FC Tokyo | 3–1 | | 1–2 | | | 2–1 | | 0–0 | 3–4 | | 0–0 | | | | 3–1 | | 3–0 | 1–0 |
| Vegalta Sendai | 0–1 | | 1–1 | 1–3 | | 1–3 | | | | 0–1 | | 3–4 | | | | | 1–2 | 3–1 |
| Ventforet Kofu | 0–0 | 0–1 | | | 1–3 | | | | | | | 0–2 | 2–2 | 0–1 | 0–0 | | 1–0 | 0–1 |
| Vissel Kobe | 1–2 | 0–2 | 1–1 | | 2–0 | 1–2 | | 3–1 | | | 7–1 | 0–4 | | | | | | 2–1 |
| Matsumoto Yamaga | | 2–0 | | | 1–3 | 1–1 | 0–1 | 2–2 | 1–2 | | 1–2 | | 1–0 | | | | | |

Updated to match(es) played on 22 November 2015. Source: J. League Data
Legend: Blue = home team win; Yellow = draw; Red = away team win.

== Top scorers ==
| Rank | Scorer | Club | Goals |
|---|---|---|---|
| 1 | (Japan) Yoshito Ōkubo | Kawasaki Frontale | 23 |
| 2 | (Brazil) Douglas | Sanfrecce Hiroshima | 21 |
| 3 | (Japan) Takashi Usami | Gamba Osaka | 19 |
| 4 | (Japan) Yohei Toyoda | Sagan Tosu | 16 |
| 5 | (Brazil) Cristiano | Kashiwa Reysol | 14 |
| 6 | (Japan) Yuki Muto | Urawa Red Diamonds | 13 |
| 7 | (Brazil) Patric | Gamba Osaka | 12 |
| 7 | (Japan) Hisato Sato | Sanfrecce Hiroshima | 12 |
| 7 | (Japan) Shinzo Koroki | Urawa Red Diamonds | 12 |
| 10 | (Japan) Genki Omae | Shimizu S-Pulse | 11 |

Updated to games played on 22 November 2015

Source: J.League Data

== Awards ==
=== Individual ===
| Award | Recipient | Club |
|---|---|---|
| Most Valuable Player | (Japan) Toshihiro Aoyama | Sanfrecce Hiroshima |
| Rookie of the Year | (Japan) Takuma Asano | Sanfrecce Hiroshima |
| Manager of the Year | (Japan) Hajime Moriyasu | Sanfrecce Hiroshima |
| Top Scorer | (Japan) Yoshito Ōkubo | Kawasaki Frontale |

=== Best Eleven ===
| Position | Footballer | Club | Nationality |
|---|---|---|---|
| GK | Shusaku Nishikawa (4) | Urawa Red Diamonds | Japan |
| DF | Kosuke Ota (2) | FC Tokyo | Japan |
| DF | Masato Morishige (3) | FC Tokyo | Japan |
| DF | Tomoaki Makino (2) | Urawa Red Diamonds | Japan |
| DF | Tsukasa Shiotani (2) | Sanfrecce Hiroshima | Japan |
| MF | Mu Kanazaki (1) | Kashima Antlers | Japan |
| MF | Toshihiro Aoyama (3) | Sanfrecce Hiroshima | Japan |
| MF | Yasuhito Endō (12) | Gamba Osaka | Japan |
| FW | Douglas (1) | Sanfrecce Hiroshima | Brazil |
| FW | Takashi Usami (2) | Gamba Osaka | Japan |
| FW | Yoshito Ōkubo (3) | Kawasaki Frontale | Japan |

* The number in brackets denotes the number of times that the footballer has appeared in the Best 11.

== Attendances ==
| Pos | Team | Total | High | Low | Average | Change |
|---|---|---|---|---|---|---|
| 1 | Urawa Red Diamonds | 658,668 | 53,148 | 22,363 | 38,745 | +9.1% |
| 2 | FC Tokyo | 489,336 | 42,604 | 12,727 | 28,784 | +14.3% |
| 3 | Yokohama F. Marinos | 411,759 | 44,226 | 8,038 | 24,221 | +4.9% |
| 4 | Albirex Niigata | 398,545 | 31,324 | 16,068 | 23,444 | +2.0% |
| 5 | Kawasaki Frontale | 356,976 | 24,992 | 14,881 | 20,999 | +26.0% |
| 6 | Matsumoto Yamaga | 285,992 | 18,906 | 11,743 | 16,823 | +32.1%^{†} |
| 7 | Kashima Antlers | 279,185 | 29,030 | 6,923 | 16,423 | −7.0% |
| 8 | Sanfrecce Hiroshima | 278,499 | 33,210 | 7,966 | 16,382 | +9.2% |
| 9 | Vissel Kobe | 276,512 | 24,027 | 7,696 | 16,265 | +8.4% |
| 10 | Nagoya Grampus | 276,082 | 33,558 | 9,986 | 16,240 | −2.9% |
| 12 | Gamba Osaka | 271,984 | 18,842 | 10,702 | 15,999 | +8.5% |
| 11 | Shimizu S-Pulse | 239,406 | 19,736 | 11,348 | 14,083 | −0.9% |
| 13 | Vegalta Sendai | 234,442 | 19,375 | 12,488 | 13,791 | −9.1% |
| 14 | Sagan Tosu | 228,644 | 20,792 | 7,524 | 13,450 | −4.9% |
| 15 | Shonan Bellmare | 207,539 | 14,581 | 9,157 | 12,208 | +44.0%^{†} |
| 16 | Ventforet Kofu | 192,042 | 14,176 | 7,015 | 11,297 | −7.2% |
| 17 | Kashiwa Reysol | 185,609 | 14,055 | 6,701 | 10,918 | +1.9% |
| 18 | Montedio Yamagata | 170,518 | 13,737 | 6,100 | 10,030 | +58.0%^{†} |
| | League total | 5,447,602 | 53,148 | 6,100 | 17,803 | +3.3% |

Updated to games played on 22 November 2015
Source: J. League Data
Notes:
^{†} Team played previous season in J2.
