= Toshiki Ishikawa =

Japanese footballer

Toshiki Ishikawa 石川 俊輝
Personal information
- Full name: Toshiki Ishikawa
- Date of birth: 10 July 1991 (age 35)
- Place of birth: Iwatsuki, Saitama, Japan
- Height: 1.74 m (5 ft 9 in)
- Position: Midfielder

Team information
- Current team: RB Omiya Ardija (U15 assistant)

Youth career
- –2003: Ohmashi Sunrise FC
- 2004–2009: Omiya Ardija

College career
Years	Team	Apps	(Gls)
2010–2013	Toyo University		

Senior career*
Years	Team	Apps	(Gls)
2014–2018	Shonan Bellmare	120	(4)
2019–2026	Omiya Ardija / RB Omiya Ardija	137	(7)
2022	→ Ventforet Kofu (loan)	28	(0)
Total		285	(11)
- * Club domestic league appearances and goals

Toshiki Ishikawa (石川 俊輝 | born 10 July 1991) is a Japanese former professional footballer who played as a midfielder. He is currently the assistant coach of RB Omiya Ardija's under-15 team.

He has played for Shonan Bellmare, RB Omiya Ardija and Ventforet Kofu.

== Career ==
Toshiki made his league debut for Shonan against Mito HollyHock on the 3 May 2014. He scored his first league goal for the club against V-Varen Nagasaki on the 3 June 2017, scoring in the 58th minute.

Toshiki made his league debut for Omiya against Ventforet Kofu on the 24 February 2019. He scored his first league goal for the club against Ehime on the 4 May 2019.

Toshiki made his league debut for Ventforet against Fagiano Okayama on the 20 February 2022.

During his second spell with the club, Toshiki made his league debut for Omiya against Tochigi on the 19 March 2023.

== Career statistics ==
Appearances and goals by club, season and competition
Club	Season	League			Emperor's Cup		J.League Cup		Other		Total	
Club	Season	Division	Apps	Goals	Apps	Goals	Apps	Goals	Apps	Goals	Apps	Goals
Shonan Bellmare	2014	J2 League	10	0	3	0	—		—		13	0
Shonan Bellmare	2015	J1 League	15	0	0	0	3	0	—		18	0
Shonan Bellmare	2016	J1 League	31	0	3	0	2	0	—		35	0
Shonan Bellmare	2017	J2 League	36	2	1	0	—		—		37	2
Shonan Bellmare	2018	J1 League	28	2	2	0	5	1	—		35	3
Shonan Bellmare	Total		120	4	9	0	10	1	—		139	5
RB Omiya Ardija	2019	J2 League	40	1	1	0	—		1 (Note: Appearance in J2 League promotion play-offs)	0	42	0
RB Omiya Ardija	2020	J2 League	7	0	—		—		—		7	0
RB Omiya Ardija	2021	J2 League	16	0	1	0	—		—		17	0
RB Omiya Ardija	2023	J2 League	22	0	0	0	—		—		22	0
RB Omiya Ardija	2024	J3 League	36	5	1	0	0	0	—		37	5
RB Omiya Ardija	2025	J2 League	9	0	1	0	1	0	0	0	11	0
RB Omiya Ardija	2026	J2/J3	7	1	—		—		—		7	1
RB Omiya Ardija	Total		137	7	4	0	1	0	1	0	143	7
Ventforet Kofu (loan)	2022	J2 League	28	0	5	0	0	0	—		33	0
Career total			285	11	18	0	11	1	1	0	315	12

== Honours ==
Shonan Bellmare

- J2 League: 2014, 2017

Ventforet Kofu

- Emperor's Cup: 2022

RB Omiya Ardija

- J3 League: 2024
