= 2018 Shonan Bellmare season =

Shonan Bellmare
2018 season
- Manager: Cho Kwi-jea
- Stadium: Shonan BMW Stadium Hiratsuka
- J1 League: 13th
Home colours	Away colours

During the 2018 season, Shonan Bellmare competed in the J1 League, in which they finished 13th.

== Squad ==
As of 22 January 2018.

Note: Flags indicate national team as defined under FIFA eligibility rules; some limited exceptions apply. Players may hold more than one non-FIFA nationality.

No.	Pos.	Nation	Player
1	GK	(Japan) JPN	Yota Akimoto
2	MF	(Japan) JPN	Shunsuke Kikuchi
3	DF	(Japan) JPN	Ryohei Okazaki
4	DF	(Brazil) BRA	André Bahia
5	MF	(Japan) JPN	Yusuke Kobayashi (on loan from Kashiwa Reysol)
6	MF	(Japan) JPN	Toshiki Ishikawa
7	MF	(Japan) JPN	Tsukasa Umesaki
8	DF	(Japan) JPN	Kazunari Ono
10	MF	(Japan) JPN	Hiroki Akino (on loan from Kashiwa Reysol)
11	MF	(Japan) JPN	Ryo Takahashi
13	MF	(Japan) JPN	Miki Yamane
14	MF	(Japan) JPN	Seiya Fujita
15	FW	(Japan) JPN	Ryunosuke Noda
16	MF	(Japan) JPN	Mitsuki Saito
17	FW	(Japan) JPN	Jin Hanato
18	MF	(Japan) JPN	Temma Matsuda

No.	Pos.	Nation	Player
19	FW	(Serbia) SRB	Alen Stevanović
20	DF	(Japan) JPN	Keisuke Saka
21	GK	(Japan) JPN	Daiki Tomii
23	FW	(Japan) JPN	Kaoru Takayama
24	FW	(Japan) JPN	Genta Omotehara
26	FW	(Japan) JPN	Kazuki Yamaguchi
27	FW	(Japan) JPN	Kunitomo Suzuki
28	DF	(Japan) JPN	Hirokazu Ishihara
29	DF	(Japan) JPN	Daiki Sugioka
30	DF	(Japan) JPN	Tsuyoshi Shimamura
31	GK	(Japan) JPN	Masaaki Goto
32	MF	(Japan) JPN	Hikaru Arai
33	GK	(Japan) JPN	Kota Sanada
36	DF	(Japan) JPN	Takuya Okamoto (on loan from Urawa Reds)
41	MF	(Croatia) CRO	Mihael Mikić
TBA	FW	(South Korea) KOR	Lee Jeong-hyeop (on loan from Busan IPark)

=== Out on loan ===
Note: Flags indicate national team as defined under FIFA eligibility rules; some limited exceptions apply. Players may hold more than one non-FIFA nationality.

No.	Pos.	Nation	Player
—	DF	(South Korea) KOR	Park Tae-hwan (to Cheonan City FC)
—	MF	(Japan) JPN	Yuta Kamiya (to Ehime FC)
—	MF	(Japan) JPN	Yuta Narawa (to Tokyo Verdy)

No.	Pos.	Nation	Player
—	FW	(Japan) JPN	Tsuyoshi Miyaichi (to Grulla Morioka)
—	FW	(Japan) JPN	Hibiki Wada (to Fukushima United FC)

== J1 League ==
Match	Date	Team	Score	Team	Venue	Attendance
1	2018.02.24	Shonan Bellmare	2-1	V-Varen Nagasaki	Shonan BMW Stadium Hiratsuka	12,148
2	2018.03.02	Kawasaki Frontale	1-1	Shonan Bellmare	Kawasaki Todoroki Stadium	22,475
3	2018.03.11	Shonan Bellmare	0-0	Nagoya Grampus	Shonan BMW Stadium Hiratsuka	12,465
4	2018.03.18	FC Tokyo	1-0	Shonan Bellmare	Ajinomoto Stadium	16,568
5	2018.03.31	Cerezo Osaka	2-1	Shonan Bellmare	Kincho Stadium	13,882
6	2018.04.07	Shonan Bellmare	2-1	Kashima Antlers	Shonan BMW Stadium Hiratsuka	13,947
7	2018.04.11	Hokkaido Consadole Sapporo	1-0	Shonan Bellmare	Sapporo Dome	11,183
8	2018.04.15	Shonan Bellmare	0-2	Sanfrecce Hiroshima	Shonan BMW Stadium Hiratsuka	10,082
9	2018.04.21	Yokohama F. Marinos	4-4	Shonan Bellmare	Nissan Stadium	19,117
10	2018.04.25	Shonan Bellmare	1-0	Gamba Osaka	Shonan BMW Stadium Hiratsuka	8,002
11	2018.04.28	Urawa Reds	0-1	Shonan Bellmare	Saitama Stadium 2002	33,132
12	2018.05.02	Shonan Bellmare	1-2	Kashiwa Reysol	Shonan BMW Stadium Hiratsuka	8,536
13	2018.05.06	Shonan Bellmare	1-3	Vegalta Sendai	Shonan BMW Stadium Hiratsuka	11,805
14	2018.05.12	Shimizu S-Pulse	4-2	Shonan Bellmare	IAI Stadium Nihondaira	14,624
15	2018.05.19	Shonan Bellmare	1-0	Júbilo Iwata	Shonan BMW Stadium Hiratsuka	14,385
16	2018.07.18	Shonan Bellmare	1-1	Sagan Tosu	Shonan BMW Stadium Hiratsuka	9,229
17	2018.07.22	Vissel Kobe	0-3	Shonan Bellmare	Noevir Stadium Kobe	26,146
19	2018.08.01	Kashiwa Reysol	0-2	Shonan Bellmare	Sankyo Frontier Kashiwa Stadium	9,846
20	2018.08.05	Sanfrecce Hiroshima	2-2	Shonan Bellmare	Edion Stadium Hiroshima	11,304
21	2018.08.11	Shonan Bellmare	0-1	Yokohama F. Marinos	Shonan BMW Stadium Hiratsuka	14,862
22	2018.08.15	Vegalta Sendai	4-1	Shonan Bellmare	Yurtec Stadium Sendai	16,892
23	2018.08.19	Shonan Bellmare	0-2	Vissel Kobe	Shonan BMW Stadium Hiratsuka	15,351
24	2018.08.26	Shonan Bellmare	0-0	FC Tokyo	Shonan BMW Stadium Hiratsuka	13,191
25	2018.08.31	V-Varen Nagasaki	1-3	Shonan Bellmare	Transcosmos Stadium Nagasaki	11,557
26	2018.09.14	Kashima Antlers	2-1	Shonan Bellmare	Kashima Soccer Stadium	10,728
27	2018.09.22	Shonan Bellmare	1-1	Cerezo Osaka	Shonan BMW Stadium Hiratsuka	12,173
18	2018.09.26	Shonan Bellmare	0-0	Kawasaki Frontale	Shonan BMW Stadium Hiratsuka	8,816
29	2018.10.06	Sagan Tosu	0-1	Shonan Bellmare	Best Amenity Stadium	11,557
30	2018.10.20	Shonan Bellmare	2-2	Hokkaido Consadole Sapporo	Shonan BMW Stadium Hiratsuka	11,982
28	2018.10.30	Júbilo Iwata	1-0	Shonan Bellmare	Yamaha Stadium	9,026
31	2018.11.02	Shonan Bellmare	0-0	Shimizu S-Pulse	Shonan BMW Stadium Hiratsuka	14,354
32	2018.11.10	Gamba Osaka	1-0	Shonan Bellmare	Panasonic Stadium Suita	23,576
33	2018.11.24	Shonan Bellmare	2-1	Urawa Reds	Shonan BMW Stadium Hiratsuka	14,711
34	2018.12.01	Nagoya Grampus	2-2	Shonan Bellmare	Paloma Mizuho Stadium	19,840
