= Cristiano (footballer, born January 1987) =

Brazilian footballer (born 1987)

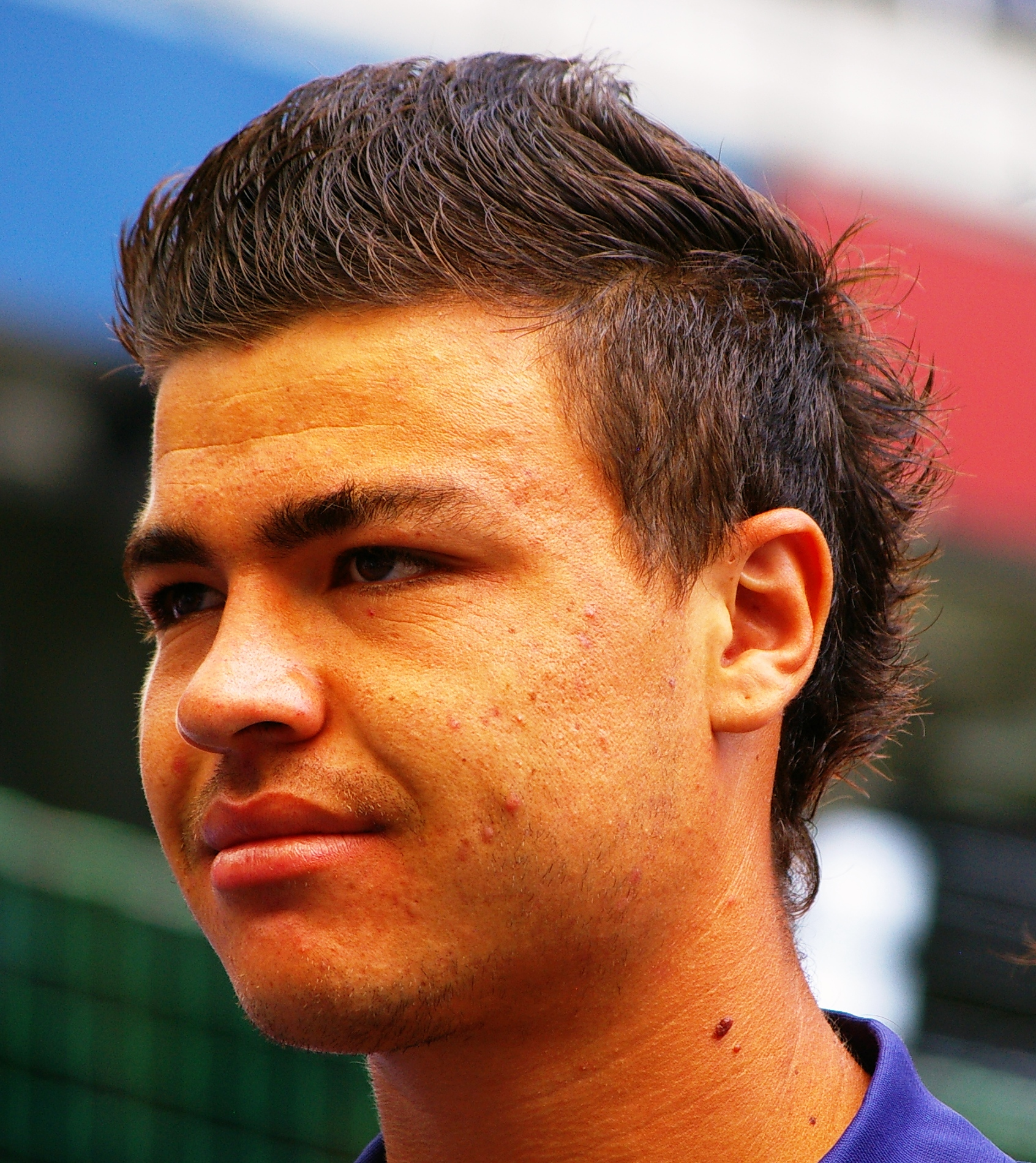
- Cristiano in 2012

Personal information
- Full name: Cristiano da Silva
- Date of birth: 12 January 1987 (age 39)
- Place of birth: Campo Mourão, Brazil
- Height: 1.82 m (6 ft 0 in)
- Positions: Attacking midfielder; forward

Youth career
- Adap Galo
- 2004–2005: Coritiba

Senior career*
Years	Team	Apps	(Gls)
2006–2007	Toledo		
2008	Adap Galo		
2008	Campo Mourão		
2008	Marcílio Dias		(4)
2009–2011	Metropolitano	22	(3)
2009	→ Rio Claro (loan)	1	(0)
2009	→ Chapecoense (loan)	13	(1)
2010–2011	→ Juventude (loan)	31	(12)
2012–2014	Red Bull Salzburg	15	(3)
2013	→ Tochigi SC (loan)	40	(16)
2014–2016	Ventforet Kofu	32	(5)
2015	→ Kashiwa Reysol (loan)	34	(14)
2016–2022	Kashiwa Reysol	123	(48)
2022–2023	V-Varen Nagasaki	48	(8)
2023	→ Ventforet Kofu (loan)	13	(2)
2024	Paraná	11	(4)
2024–2025	Portuguesa	26	(10)
2025	→ Londrina (loan)	10	(1)
2026	Ponte Preta	3	(1)
2026	Avaí	10	(0)
- * Club domestic league appearances and goals as of 15 April 2026

Cristiano da Silva (Brazilian Portuguese: [kɾisˈtʃjɐnu dɐ ˈsiwvɐ]; born 12 January 1987), simply known as Cristiano, is a Brazilian footballer who plays as either an attacking midfielder or a forward.

== Career ==
=== Early career ===
Cristiano was a youth product of Coritiba, but made his senior debut with Toledo in 2006. He subsequently represented Adap Galo, Campo Mourão and Marcílio Dias before signing for Metropolitano in 2009.

In 2009, after a short loan spell at Rio Claro, Cristiano joined Chapecoense also in a temporary deal. On 22 April 2010, after playing in the year's Campeonato Catarinense back at Metrô, he joined Juventude on loan.

Cristiano became a key unit at Ju during the 2011 campaign, scoring six goals in just nine matches in the 2011 Série D before departing.

=== Red Bull Salzburg ===
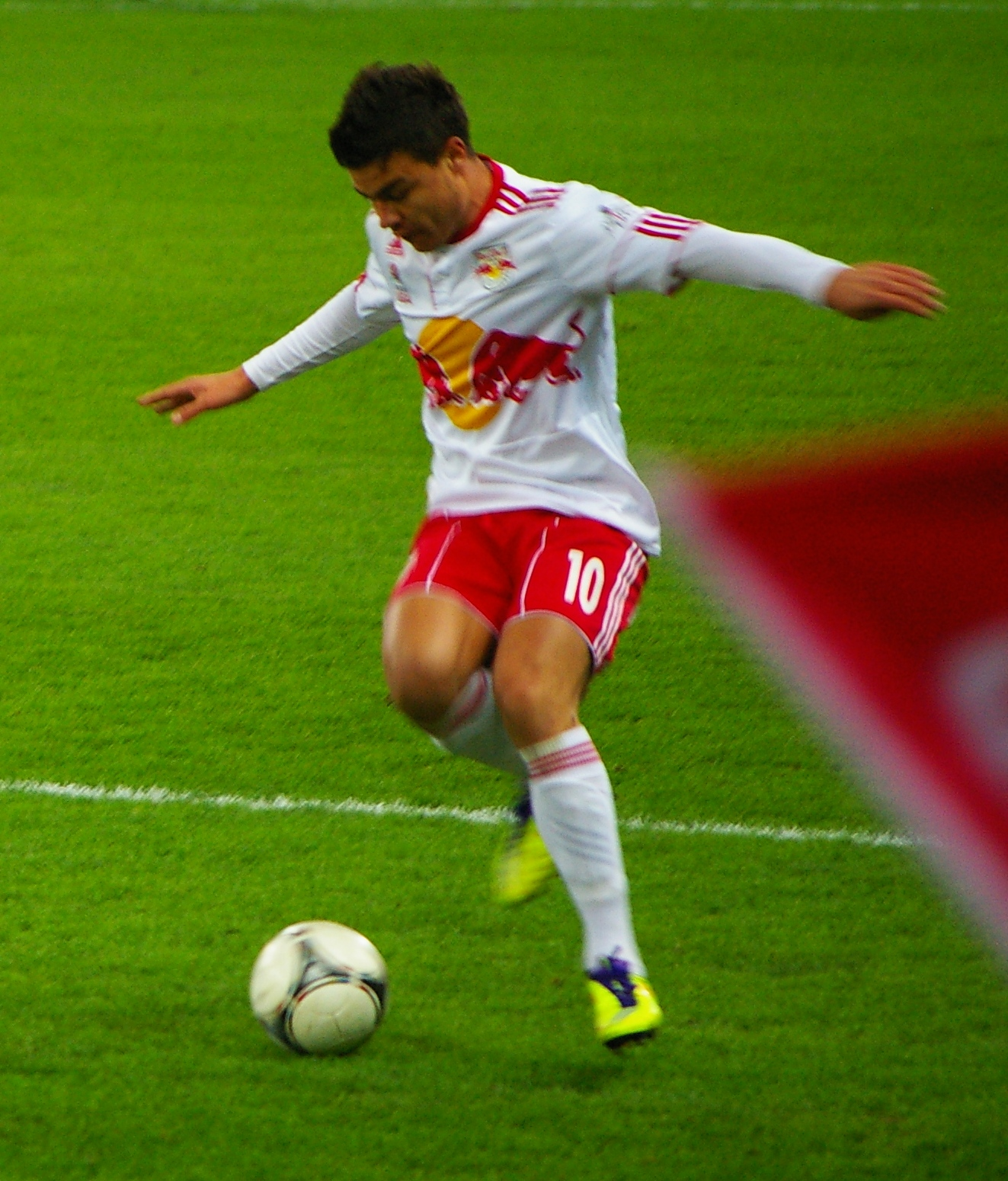
Cristiano playing for Red Bull Salzburg in 2012

In October 2011, Cristiano moved to Austria and joined Red Bull Salzburg on a trial basis. He only signed a contract with the club in December, and was officially announced on a three-and-a-half-year deal on 7 January 2012. Despite helping in the club's Bundesliga and Austrian Cup titles during the 2011–12 season, he was suspended and sent to farm team FC Liefering in September 2012.

==== Loan to Tochigi ====
On 11 December 2012, it was announced that Cristiano would be joining Tochigi SC on loan for the 2013 season. He scored 16 goals during the 2013 J.League Division 2, being the club's top scorer with compatriot Sabiá.

=== Ventforet Kofu ===
On 8 January 2014, Cristiano joined Ventforet Kofu on a permanent transfer. He was a regular starter for the side, but moved to Kashiwa Reysol on loan on 13 January 2015.

Back to Ventforet after scoring a career-best 21 goals for Kashiwa, Cristiano started the 2016 season scoring a brace in a 2–0 away win over Vissel Kobe on 27 February.

=== Kashiwa Reysol ===
On 26 June 2016, after previously spending the past year on loan at the club, Kashiwa Reysol announced they had re-signed Cristiano on a permanent basis to a multi-year contract. He enjoyed a seven-year spell at Kashiwa, scoring 93 goals for the side; his best inputs occurred during the 2019 campaign, as he scored 19 goals to help the club return to the first division.

=== V-Varen Nagasaki ===
On 26 December 2021, Cristiano moved to V-Varen Nagasaki. A regular starter in his first year, he subsequently lost space in his second.

==== Return to Ventforet Kofu (loan) ====
On 5 August 2023, Cristiano was returned to Ventforet Kofu on loan until the end of the year. He scored his first goal for Ventforet against Mito HollyHock on 30 of September.

Cristiano left both Ventforet and V-Varen after the expiration of his loan.

=== Paraná ===
On 27 March 2024, Cristiano returned to Brazil after more than 12 years, after signing for Paraná. He helped the club to win the Campeonato Paranaense Série Prata, featuring in 11 of the 13 matches and scoring four goals.

=== Portuguesa ===
On 9 August 2024, Cristiano was announced at Portuguesa for the Copa Paulista. He remained in the squad for the 2025 Campeonato Paulista, and was the club's top scorer in the competition before signing a one-year extension on 6 March 2025.

==== Londrina (loan) ====
On 18 August 2025, after being Lusa's top scorer in the Série D, Cristiano was loaned to Londrina until the end of the season. Regularly used, he scored once in ten matches to help the club to achieve promotion to the second divisioon.

=== Ponte Preta ===
On 1 December 2025, Cristiano rescinded his contract with Portuguesa to join Ponte Preta, also promoted to division two.

== Career statistics ==
As of 11 August 2025

Club	Season	League			State League (Note: Includes Campeonato Catarinense, Campeonato Paulista Série A2, Campeonato Gaúcho)		Cup (Note: Includes Austrian Cup, Emperor's Cup)		League Cup (Note: Includes J.League Cup)		Continental		Other		Total	
Club	Season	Division	Apps	Goals	Apps	Goals	Apps	Goals	Apps	Goals	Apps	Goals	Apps	Goals	Apps	Goals
Metropolitano	2009	Catarinense	—		10	1	—		—		—		—		10	1
Metropolitano	2010	Série D	0	0	12	2	—		—		—		—		12	2
Metropolitano	Total		0	0	22	3	—		—		—		—		22	3
Rio Claro (loan)	2009	Paulista A2	—		1	0	—		—		—		—		1	0
Chapecoense (loan)	2009	Série D	13	1	—		—		—		—		—		13	1
Juventude (loan)	2010	Série C	7	1	—		—		—		—		—		7	1
Juventude (loan)	2011	Série D	9	6	15	5	—		—		—		7 (Note: Appearance(s) in Copa FGF)	1	31	12
Juventude (loan)	Total		16	7	15	5	—		—		—		7	1	38	13
Red Bull Salzburg	2011–12	Austrian Bundesliga	15	3	—		3	0	—		—		—		18	3
Red Bull Salzburg	2012–13	Austrian Bundesliga	0	0	—		1	1	—		2 (Note: Appearance(s) in UEFA Champions League)	1	—		3	2
Red Bull Salzburg	Total		15	3	—		4	1	—		2	1	—		21	5
Tochigi SC	2013	J. League Division 2	40	16	—		1	0	—		—		—		41	16
Ventforet Kofu	2014	J. League Division 1	32	5	—		3	1	5	6	—		—		40	12
Ventforet Kofu	2016	J1 League	17	7	—		0	0	4	0	—		—		21	7
Ventforet Kofu	Total		49	12	—		3	1	9	6	—		—		61	19
Kashiwa Reysol (loan)	2015	J1 League	34	14	—		3	4	2	0	10 (Note: Appearance(s) in AFC Champions League)	3	—		49	21
Kashiwa Reysol	2016	J1 League	17	9	—		3	3	0	0	—		—		20	12
Kashiwa Reysol	2017	J1 League	33	12	—		4	4	2	0	—		—		39	16
Kashiwa Reysol	2018	J1 League	34	8	—		1	1	4	1	6	3	—		45	13
Kashiwa Reysol	2019	J2 League	39	19	—		2	0	3	0	—		—		44	19
Kashiwa Reysol	2020	J1 League	15	4	—		—		3	0	—		—		18	4
Kashiwa Reysol	2021	J1 League	31	7	—		2	1	2	1	—		—		35	9
Kashiwa Reysol	Total		203	73	—		15	13	20	2	16	6	—		254	94
V-Varen Nagasaki	2022	J2 League	36	6	—		1	1	—		—		—		37	7
V-Varen Nagasaki	2023	J2 League	12	2	—		1	0	—		—		—		13	2
V-Varen Nagasaki	Total		48	8	—		2	1	—		—		—		50	9
Ventforet Kofu (loan)	2023	J2 League	12	2	—		0	0	—		5	0	—		17	2
Paraná	2024	Paranaense Série Prata	—		11	4	—		—		—		—		11	4
Portuguesa	2024	Paulista	—		—		—		—		—		8 (Note: Appearance(s) in Copa Paulista)	4	8	4
Portuguesa	2025	Série D	16	7	10	3	0	0	—		—		—		26	10
Portuguesa	Total		16	7	10	3	0	0	—		—		8	4	34	14
Londrina (loan)	2025	Série C	10	1	—		—		—		—		—		10	1
Ponte Preta	2026	Série B	0	0	0	0	0	0	—		—		—		0	0
Career total			458	136	59	15	26	17	29	8	23	7	15	5	587	188

== Honours ==
Juventude

- Copa FGF: 2011

Red Bull Salzburg

- Austrian Football Bundesliga: 2011–12
- Austrian Cup: 2011–12

Kashiwa Reysol

- J2 League: 2019

Paraná

- Campeonato Paranaense Série Prata: 2024
