= 2018 Kashiwa Reysol season =

Kashiwa Reysol
2018 season
- Manager: Takahiro Shimotaira; Nozomu Kato; Ken Iwase
- Stadium: Sankyo Frontier Kashiwa Stadium
- J1 League: 17th
Home colours	Away colours

2018 Kashiwa Reysol season.

== Squad ==
As of 10 January 2018.

Note: Flags indicate national team as defined under FIFA eligibility rules; some limited exceptions apply. Players may hold more than one non-FIFA nationality.

No.	Pos.	Nation	Player
1	GK	JPN	Kazushige Kirihata
2	DF	JPN	Jiro Kamata
4	DF	JPN	Shinnosuke Nakatani
5	DF	JPN	Yuta Nakayama
7	MF	JPN	Hidekazu Otani (captain)
8	MF	JPN	Kei Koizumi
9	FW	BRA	Cristiano
10	MF	JPN	Ataru Esaka
11	FW	JPN	Ryohei Yamazaki
13	DF	JPN	Ryuta Koike
14	FW	JPN	Junya Ito
15	MF	KOR	Kim Bo-kyung
16	GK	JPN	Haruhiko Takimoto
17	MF	JPN	Kohei Tezuka

No.	Pos.	Nation	Player
18	MF	JPN	Yusuke Segawa
19	MF	JPN	Hiroto Nakagawa
20	FW	BRA	Ramon Lopes
21	GK	JPN	Haruki Saruta
22	DF	KOR	Park Jeong-su
23	GK	JPN	Kosuke Nakamura
24	DF	JPN	Toshiaki Miyamoto
25	MF	JPN	Riku Tanaka
26	DF	JPN	Taiyo Koga
27	DF	JPN	Tomoki Imai
28	MF	JPN	Ryoichi Kurisawa
29	DF	JPN	So Nakagawa
30	MF	JPN	Masakatsu Sawa
37	MF	JPN	Hajime Hosogai
39	DF	JPN	Masashi Kamekawa

=== Out on loan ===
Note: Flags indicate national team as defined under FIFA eligibility rules; some limited exceptions apply. Players may hold more than one non-FIFA nationality.

No.	Pos.	Nation	Player
—	DF	JPN	Takuya Hashiguchi (at Machida Zelvia)
—	DF	JPN	Tatsuya Masushima (at JEF United Chiba)
—	MF	JPN	Hiroki Akino (at Shonan Bellmare)

No.	Pos.	Nation	Player
—	MF	JPN	Kaito Anzai (at Montedio Yamagata)
—	MF	JPN	Yūsuke Kobayashi (at Shonan Bellmare)
—	FW	BRA	Diego Oliveira (at FC Tokyo)

== J1 League ==
Match	Date	Team	Score	Team	Venue	Attendance
1	2018.02.25	Vegalta Sendai	1-0	Kashiwa Reysol	Yurtec Stadium Sendai	15,655
2	2018.03.02	Kashiwa Reysol	2-0	Yokohama F. Marinos	Sankyo Frontier Kashiwa Stadium	10,659
3	2018.03.10	Kashiwa Reysol	1-1	Cerezo Osaka	Sankyo Frontier Kashiwa Stadium	11,091
4	2018.03.18	Gamba Osaka	2-2	Kashiwa Reysol	Panasonic Stadium Suita	21,758
5	2018.03.30	Kashiwa Reysol	2-1	Vissel Kobe	Sankyo Frontier Kashiwa Stadium	9,642
6	2018.04.08	Kashiwa Reysol	0-1	Sanfrecce Hiroshima	Sankyo Frontier Kashiwa Stadium	11,089
7	2018.04.11	Sagan Tosu	1-2	Kashiwa Reysol	Best Amenity Stadium	7,138
8	2018.04.14	Kashiwa Reysol	1-2	Hokkaido Consadole Sapporo	Sankyo Frontier Kashiwa Stadium	9,533
9	2018.04.22	V-Varen Nagasaki	1-0	Kashiwa Reysol	Transcosmos Stadium Nagasaki	7,676
10	2018.04.25	Kashiwa Reysol	1-0	Urawa Reds	Sankyo Frontier Kashiwa Stadium	11,257
11	2018.04.28	Shimizu S-Pulse	2-1	Kashiwa Reysol	IAI Stadium Nihondaira	13,100
12	2018.05.02	Shonan Bellmare	1-2	Kashiwa Reysol	Shonan BMW Stadium Hiratsuka	8,536
13	2018.05.05	Kashiwa Reysol	1-2	Júbilo Iwata	Sankyo Frontier Kashiwa Stadium	14,208
14	2018.05.12	Kashiwa Reysol	1-2	Kawasaki Frontale	Sankyo Frontier Kashiwa Stadium	12,584
15	2018.05.20	Nagoya Grampus	2-3	Kashiwa Reysol	Toyota Stadium	21,327
16	2018.07.18	Kashiwa Reysol	0-1	FC Tokyo	Sankyo Frontier Kashiwa Stadium	11,453
17	2018.07.22	Kashima Antlers	6-2	Kashiwa Reysol	Kashima Soccer Stadium	24,480
18	2018.07.28	Vissel Kobe	1-0	Kashiwa Reysol	Noevir Stadium Kobe	22,879
19	2018.08.01	Kashiwa Reysol	0-2	Shonan Bellmare	Sankyo Frontier Kashiwa Stadium	9,846
20	2018.08.05	Hokkaido Consadole Sapporo	1-2	Kashiwa Reysol	Sapporo Dome	26,805
21	2018.08.11	Kashiwa Reysol	0-2	Vegalta Sendai	Sankyo Frontier Kashiwa Stadium	12,666
22	2018.08.15	FC Tokyo	0-1	Kashiwa Reysol	Ajinomoto Stadium	20,986
23	2018.08.19	Júbilo Iwata	2-0	Kashiwa Reysol	Yamaha Stadium	13,515
24	2018.08.25	Kashiwa Reysol	5-1	V-Varen Nagasaki	Sankyo Frontier Kashiwa Stadium	11,534
25	2018.09.01	Yokohama F. Marinos	3-1	Kashiwa Reysol	Nissan Stadium	22,752
26	2018.09.15	Kashiwa Reysol	2-3	Shimizu S-Pulse	Sankyo Frontier Kashiwa Stadium	11,105
27	2018.09.22	Kashiwa Reysol	1-1	Sagan Tosu	Sankyo Frontier Kashiwa Stadium	12,922
28	2018.09.30	Urawa Reds	3-2	Kashiwa Reysol	Saitama Stadium 2002	26,431
29	2018.10.06	Sanfrecce Hiroshima	0-3	Kashiwa Reysol	Edion Stadium Hiroshima	11,683
30	2018.10.19	Kashiwa Reysol	0-1	Nagoya Grampus	Sankyo Frontier Kashiwa Stadium	11,922
31	2018.11.03	Kawasaki Frontale	3-0	Kashiwa Reysol	Kawasaki Todoroki Stadium	24,487
32	2018.11.06	Kashiwa Reysol	2-3	Kashima Antlers	Sankyo Frontier Kashiwa Stadium	9,255
33	2018.11.24	Cerezo Osaka	0-3	Kashiwa Reysol	Yanmar Stadium Nagai	23,110
34	2018.12.01	Kashiwa Reysol	4-2	Gamba Osaka	Sankyo Frontier Kashiwa Stadium	13,067
