= 2015 Shonan Bellmare season =

Shonan Bellmare
2015 season
- Manager: Cho Kwi-jea
- Stadium: Shonan BMW Stadium Hiratsuka
- J1 League: 8th

2015 Shonan Bellmare season.

== J1 League ==
=== League table ===
| Pos | Team | Pld | W | D | L | GF | GA | GD | Pts |
|---|---|---|---|---|---|---|---|---|---|
| 7 | Yokohama F. Marinos | 34 | 15 | 10 | 9 | 45 | 32 | +13 | 55 |
| 8 | Shonan Bellmare | 34 | 13 | 9 | 12 | 40 | 44 | −4 | 48 |
| 9 | Nagoya Grampus | 34 | 13 | 7 | 14 | 44 | 48 | −4 | 46 |

Updated to match(es) played on 28 November 2015. Source: Meiji Yasuda J1 League Standings
Rules for classification: 1) Points; 2) Goal difference; 3) Goals scored

=== Match details ===
J1 League match details
| Match | Date | Team | Score | Team | Venue | Attendance |
|---|---|---|---|---|---|---|
| 1-1 | 2015.03.07 | Shonan Bellmare | 1-3 | Urawa Reds | Shonan BMW Stadium Hiratsuka | 14,446 |
| 1-2 | 2015.03.14 | Kashima Antlers | 1-2 | Shonan Bellmare | Kashima Soccer Stadium | 17,295 |
| 1-3 | 2015.03.22 | Shonan Bellmare | 0-0 | Vegalta Sendai | Shonan BMW Stadium Hiratsuka | 11,315 |
| 1-4 | 2015.04.04 | Montedio Yamagata | 1-2 | Shonan Bellmare | ND Soft Stadium Yamagata | 7,321 |
| 1-5 | 2015.04.12 | Shonan Bellmare | 0-1 | FC Tokyo | Shonan BMW Stadium Hiratsuka | 14,581 |
| 1-6 | 2015.04.18 | Shonan Bellmare | 0-2 | Gamba Osaka | Shonan BMW Stadium Hiratsuka | 14,538 |
| 1-7 | 2015.04.25 | Yokohama F. Marinos | 3-0 | Shonan Bellmare | Nissan Stadium | 20,388 |
| 1-8 | 2015.04.29 | Shonan Bellmare | 4-2 | Sagan Tosu | Shonan BMW Stadium Hiratsuka | 9,603 |
| 1-9 | 2015.05.02 | Nagoya Grampus | 3-0 | Shonan Bellmare | Paloma Mizuho Stadium | 11,375 |
| 1-10 | 2015.05.06 | Shonan Bellmare | 1-1 | Vissel Kobe | Shonan BMW Stadium Hiratsuka | 9,157 |
| 1-11 | 2015.05.10 | Ventforet Kofu | 0-1 | Shonan Bellmare | Yamanashi Chuo Bank Stadium | 10,350 |
| 1-12 | 2015.05.14 | Kashiwa Reysol | 0-0 | Shonan Bellmare | Hitachi Kashiwa Stadium | 6,701 |
| 1-13 | 2015.05.23 | Shonan Bellmare | 4-0 | Shimizu S-Pulse | Shonan BMW Stadium Hiratsuka | 13,248 |
| 1-14 | 2015.05.30 | Shonan Bellmare | 0-0 | Sanfrecce Hiroshima | Shonan BMW Stadium Hiratsuka | 11,276 |
| 1-15 | 2015.06.07 | Kawasaki Frontale | 2-1 | Shonan Bellmare | Kawasaki Todoroki Stadium | 20,857 |
| 1-16 | 2015.06.20 | Shonan Bellmare | 1-3 | Albirex Niigata | Shonan BMW Stadium Hiratsuka | 11,175 |
| 1-17 | 2015.06.27 | Matsumoto Yamaga FC | 2-3 | Shonan Bellmare | Matsumotodaira Park Stadium | 15,456 |
| 2-1 | 2015.07.11 | Shonan Bellmare | 2-1 | Nagoya Grampus | Shonan BMW Stadium Hiratsuka | 10,752 |
| 2-2 | 2015.07.15 | Vissel Kobe | 1-1 | Shonan Bellmare | Noevir Stadium Kobe | 7,696 |
| 2-3 | 2015.07.19 | Shonan Bellmare | 0-2 | Ventforet Kofu | Shonan BMW Stadium Hiratsuka | 12,144 |
| 2-4 | 2015.07.25 | Sagan Tosu | 1-1 | Shonan Bellmare | Best Amenity Stadium | 11,960 |
| 2-5 | 2015.07.29 | Shonan Bellmare | 3-0 | Kashiwa Reysol | Shonan BMW Stadium Hiratsuka | 10,411 |
| 2-6 | 2015.08.12 | Shimizu S-Pulse | 1-2 | Shonan Bellmare | IAI Stadium Nihondaira | 15,946 |
| 2-7 | 2015.08.16 | Urawa Reds | 1-0 | Shonan Bellmare | Saitama Stadium 2002 | 36,185 |
| 2-8 | 2015.08.22 | Shonan Bellmare | 2-1 | Kawasaki Frontale | Shonan BMW Stadium Hiratsuka | 14,136 |
| 2-9 | 2015.08.30 | Gamba Osaka | 1-0 | Shonan Bellmare | Expo '70 Commemorative Stadium | 14,985 |
| 2-10 | 2015.09.12 | Shonan Bellmare | 1-1 | Matsumoto Yamaga FC | Shonan BMW Stadium Hiratsuka | 12,230 |
| 2-11 | 2015.09.19 | Vegalta Sendai | 1-1 | Shonan Bellmare | Yurtec Stadium Sendai | 12,635 |
| 2-12 | 2015.09.26 | Shonan Bellmare | 1-1 | Yokohama F. Marinos | Shonan BMW Stadium Hiratsuka | 14,046 |
| 2-13 | 2015.10.03 | Shonan Bellmare | 0-1 | Montedio Yamagata | Shonan BMW Stadium Hiratsuka | 10,254 |
| 2-14 | 2015.10.17 | FC Tokyo | 1-2 | Shonan Bellmare | Ajinomoto Stadium | 22,577 |
| 2-15 | 2015.10.24 | Shonan Bellmare | 2-1 | Kashima Antlers | Shonan BMW Stadium Hiratsuka | 14,227 |
| 2-16 | 2015.11.07 | Albirex Niigata | 0-2 | Shonan Bellmare | Denka Big Swan Stadium | 25,272 |
| 2-17 | 2015.11.22 | Sanfrecce Hiroshima | 5-0 | Shonan Bellmare | Edion Stadium Hiroshima | 33,210 |
