= 2016 Shonan Bellmare season =

Shonan Bellmare
2016 season
- Manager: Cho Kwi-jea
- Stadium: Shonan BMW Stadium Hiratsuka
- J1 League: 17th

2016 Shonan Bellmare season.

== J1 League ==
=== League table ===
Pos	Team	Pld	W	D	L	GF	GA	GD	Pts	Qualification or relegation
16	Nagoya Grampus (R)	34	7	9	18	38	58	−20	30	Relegation to 2017 J2 League
17	Shonan Bellmare (R)	34	7	6	21	30	56	−26	27	Relegation to 2017 J2 League
18	Avispa Fukuoka (R)	34	4	7	23	26	66	−40	19	Relegation to 2017 J2 League

Source: Meiji Yasuda J1 League
Rules for classification: 1) Points; 2) Goal difference; 3) Goals scored.
(R) Relegated

=== Match details ===
J1 League match details
Match	Date	Team	Score	Team	Venue	Attendance
1-1	2016.02.27	Shonan Bellmare	1-2	Albirex Niigata	Shonan BMW Stadium Hiratsuka	14,058
1-2	2016.03.05	Kawasaki Frontale	4-4	Shonan Bellmare	Kawasaki Todoroki Stadium	21,871
1-3	2016.03.12	Sanfrecce Hiroshima	2-2	Shonan Bellmare	Edion Stadium Hiroshima	13,460
1-4	2016.03.20	Shonan Bellmare	0-2	Urawa Reds	Shonan BMW Stadium Hiratsuka	14,419
1-5	2016.04.02	Shonan Bellmare	1-2	Vissel Kobe	Shonan BMW Stadium Hiratsuka	8,052
1-6	2016.04.10	Ventforet Kofu	3-1	Shonan Bellmare	Yamanashi Chuo Bank Stadium	10,027
1-7	2016.04.16	Shonan Bellmare	0-3	Kashima Antlers	Shonan BMW Stadium Hiratsuka	13,039
1-8	2016.04.24	Shonan Bellmare	0-1	Omiya Ardija	Shonan BMW Stadium Hiratsuka	9,080
1-9	2016.04.30	Yokohama F. Marinos	0-1	Shonan Bellmare	Nissan Stadium	26,518
1-10	2016.05.04	Sagan Tosu	0-1	Shonan Bellmare	Best Amenity Stadium	20,219
1-11	2016.05.08	Shonan Bellmare	0-1	FC Tokyo	Shonan BMW Stadium Hiratsuka	13,029
1-12	2016.05.14	Avispa Fukuoka	1-0	Shonan Bellmare	Level5 Stadium	8,048
1-13	2016.05.21	Shonan Bellmare	0-1	Vegalta Sendai	Shonan BMW Stadium Hiratsuka	11,581
1-14	2016.05.29	Shonan Bellmare	2-1	Nagoya Grampus	Shonan BMW Stadium Hiratsuka	10,147
1-15	2016.06.11	Gamba Osaka	3-3	Shonan Bellmare	Suita City Football Stadium	22,257
1-16	2016.06.18	Shonan Bellmare	1-0	Júbilo Iwata	Shonan BMW Stadium Hiratsuka	11,341
1-17	2016.06.25	Kashiwa Reysol	1-1	Shonan Bellmare	Hitachi Kashiwa Stadium	9,643
2-1	2016.07.02	Shonan Bellmare	0-3	Yokohama F. Marinos	Shonan BMW Stadium Hiratsuka	13,677
2-2	2016.07.09	Albirex Niigata	0-1	Shonan Bellmare	Denka Big Swan Stadium	16,410
2-3	2016.07.13	Shonan Bellmare	0-2	Sagan Tosu	Shonan BMW Stadium Hiratsuka	9,079
2-4	2016.07.17	Vissel Kobe	2-0	Shonan Bellmare	Noevir Stadium Kobe	13,076
2-5	2016.07.23	Vegalta Sendai	1-0	Shonan Bellmare	Yurtec Stadium Sendai	13,612
2-6	2016.07.30	Shonan Bellmare	2-3	Kawasaki Frontale	Shonan BMW Stadium Hiratsuka	14,096
2-7	2016.08.06	Urawa Reds	4-1	Shonan Bellmare	Saitama Stadium 2002	29,104
2-8	2016.08.13	Shonan Bellmare	1-2	Sanfrecce Hiroshima	Shonan BMW Stadium Hiratsuka	11,376
2-9	2016.08.20	Kashima Antlers	1-0	Shonan Bellmare	Kashima Soccer Stadium	14,233
2-10	2016.08.27	Shonan Bellmare	1-2	Gamba Osaka	Shonan BMW Stadium Hiratsuka	10,664
2-11	2016.09.10	FC Tokyo	3-0	Shonan Bellmare	Ajinomoto Stadium	18,744
2-12	2016.09.17	Shonan Bellmare	0-2	Avispa Fukuoka	Shonan BMW Stadium Hiratsuka	9,826
2-13	2016.09.25	Júbilo Iwata	0-0	Shonan Bellmare	Yamaha Stadium	11,749
2-14	2016.10.01	Shonan Bellmare	0-0	Kashiwa Reysol	Shonan BMW Stadium Hiratsuka	10,665
2-15	2016.10.22	Omiya Ardija	3-2	Shonan Bellmare	NACK5 Stadium Omiya	12,106
2-16	2016.10.29	Shonan Bellmare	1-0	Ventforet Kofu	Shonan BMW Stadium Hiratsuka	11,883
2-17	2016.11.03	Nagoya Grampus	1-3	Shonan Bellmare	Paloma Mizuho Stadium	18,474
