= 2013 Shonan Bellmare season =

Shonan Bellmare
2013 season
- Manager: Cho Kwi-jea
- Stadium: Shonan BMW Stadium Hiratsuka
- J1 League: 16th

2013 Shonan Bellmare season.

== J1 League ==
Match	Date	Team	Score	Team	Venue	Attendance
1	2013.03.02	Yokohama F. Marinos	4-2	Shonan Bellmare	Nissan Stadium	24,298
2	2013.03.09	Shonan Bellmare	1-1	Sagan Tosu	Shonan BMW Stadium Hiratsuka	11,439
3	2013.03.16	Shonan Bellmare	1-1	Shimizu S-Pulse	Shonan BMW Stadium Hiratsuka	9,453
4	2013.03.30	Nagoya Grampus	2-0	Shonan Bellmare	Nagoya Mizuho Athletic Stadium	10,706
5	2013.04.06	Shonan Bellmare	1-1	Kawasaki Frontale	Shonan BMW Stadium Hiratsuka	7,347
6	2013.04.14	Urawa Reds	2-0	Shonan Bellmare	Saitama Stadium 2002	36,477
7	2013.04.20	Shonan Bellmare	2-1	Oita Trinita	Shonan BMW Stadium Hiratsuka	6,301
8	2013.04.27	Júbilo Iwata	4-0	Shonan Bellmare	Yamaha Stadium	9,272
9	2013.05.03	Shonan Bellmare	0-3	Cerezo Osaka	Shonan BMW Stadium Hiratsuka	10,947
10	2013.05.06	Kashima Antlers	1-0	Shonan Bellmare	Kashima Soccer Stadium	16,411
11	2013.05.11	Shonan Bellmare	3-2	FC Tokyo	Shonan BMW Stadium Hiratsuka	8,248
12	2013.05.18	Omiya Ardija	2-1	Shonan Bellmare	NACK5 Stadium Omiya	10,886
13	2013.05.25	Shonan Bellmare	0-2	Sanfrecce Hiroshima	Shonan BMW Stadium Hiratsuka	10,682
14	2013.07.06	Vegalta Sendai	0-0	Shonan Bellmare	Yurtec Stadium Sendai	13,470
15	2013.07.10	Shonan Bellmare	1-2	Kashiwa Reysol	Shonan BMW Stadium Hiratsuka	7,319
16	2013.07.13	Ventforet Kofu	0-1	Shonan Bellmare	Yamanashi Chuo Bank Stadium	10,175
17	2013.07.17	Shonan Bellmare	0-2	Albirex Niigata	Shonan BMW Stadium Hiratsuka	6,080
18	2013.07.31	Kawasaki Frontale	1-2	Shonan Bellmare	Kawasaki Todoroki Stadium	15,934
19	2013.08.03	Shonan Bellmare	1-2	Yokohama F. Marinos	Shonan BMW Stadium Hiratsuka	13,786
20	2013.08.10	Shimizu S-Pulse	3-1	Shonan Bellmare	IAI Stadium Nihondaira	15,395
21	2013.08.17	Shonan Bellmare	1-1	Júbilo Iwata	Shonan BMW Stadium Hiratsuka	12,140
22	2013.08.24	Shonan Bellmare	1-2	Ventforet Kofu	Shonan BMW Stadium Hiratsuka	10,165
23	2013.08.28	Kashiwa Reysol	5-2	Shonan Bellmare	Hitachi Kashiwa Stadium	8,110
24	2013.08.31	Shonan Bellmare	3-2	Vegalta Sendai	Shonan BMW Stadium Hiratsuka	11,188
25	2013.09.14	Sagan Tosu	1-0	Shonan Bellmare	Best Amenity Stadium	9,391
26	2013.09.21	Oita Trinita	1-2	Shonan Bellmare	Oita Bank Dome	8,520
27	2013.09.28	Shonan Bellmare	2-2	Urawa Reds	Shonan BMW Stadium Hiratsuka	13,743
28	2013.10.05	Shonan Bellmare	1-1	Nagoya Grampus	Shonan BMW Stadium Hiratsuka	8,650
29	2013.10.19	Cerezo Osaka	2-1	Shonan Bellmare	Kincho Stadium	15,766
30	2013.10.27	Albirex Niigata	3-2	Shonan Bellmare	Tohoku Denryoku Big Swan Stadium	23,949
31	2013.11.10	Shonan Bellmare	1-2	Kashima Antlers	Shonan BMW Stadium Hiratsuka	11,736
32	2013.11.23	FC Tokyo	2-1	Shonan Bellmare	Ajinomoto Stadium	21,648
33	2013.11.30	Sanfrecce Hiroshima	1-0	Shonan Bellmare	Edion Stadium Hiroshima	27,392
34	2013.12.07	Shonan Bellmare	0-1	Omiya Ardija	Shonan BMW Stadium Hiratsuka	9,257
