= 2017 Shonan Bellmare season =

Shonan Bellmare
2017 season
- Manager: Cho Kwi-jea
- Stadium: Shonan BMW Stadium Hiratsuka
- J2 League: 1st

2017 Shonan Bellmare season.

== J2 League ==
=== League table ===
Pos	Team	Pld	W	D	L	GF	GA	GD	Pts	Promotion, qualification or relegation
1	Shonan Bellmare (C, P)	42	24	11	7	58	36	+22	83	Promotion to 2018 J1 League
2	V-Varen Nagasaki (P)	42	24	8	10	59	41	+18	80	Promotion to 2018 J1 League
3	Nagoya Grampus (O, P)	42	23	6	13	85	65	+20	75	Qualification for promotion playoffs (Note: Only teams that meet J1 license criteria can participate in promotion playoffs. If one or more teams fail to meet the criteria, only eligible teams that finished 3rd to 6th will participate and no replacement teams will be added.)

Updated to match(es) played on 28 November 2017. Source: 2017 MEIJI YASUDA J2 LEAGUE League table
Rules for classification: 1) Points; 2) Goal difference; 3) Goals scored
(C) Champions; (O) Play-off winners; (P) Promoted

=== Match details ===
J2 League match details
Match	Date	Team	Score	Team	Venue	Attendance
1	2017.02.26	Mito HollyHock	0-1	Shonan Bellmare	K's denki Stadium Mito	8,636
2	2017.03.04	Shonan Bellmare	3-1	Thespakusatsu Gunma	Shonan BMW Stadium Hiratsuka	9,021
3	2017.03.12	Zweigen Kanazawa	0-0	Shonan Bellmare	Ishikawa Athletics Stadium	5,241
4	2017.03.19	Ehime FC	0-1	Shonan Bellmare	Ningineer Stadium	3,493
5	2017.03.25	Shonan Bellmare	2-0	JEF United Chiba	Shonan BMW Stadium Hiratsuka	10,211
6	2017.04.02	Kamatamare Sanuki	3-0	Shonan Bellmare	Pikara Stadium	2,983
7	2017.04.09	Tokyo Verdy	2-3	Shonan Bellmare	Komazawa Olympic Park Stadium	5,879
8	2017.04.15	Shonan Bellmare	3-3	FC Gifu	Shonan BMW Stadium Hiratsuka	7,375
9	2017.04.22	Shonan Bellmare	0-1	Oita Trinita	Shonan BMW Stadium Hiratsuka	7,101
10	2017.04.29	Fagiano Okayama	0-2	Shonan Bellmare	City Light Stadium	8,089
11	2017.05.03	Shonan Bellmare	1-0	Renofa Yamaguchi FC	Shonan BMW Stadium Hiratsuka	8,393
12	2017.05.07	FC Machida Zelvia	0-0	Shonan Bellmare	Machida Stadium	6,203
13	2017.05.13	Roasso Kumamoto	0-1	Shonan Bellmare	Egao Kenko Stadium	4,579
14	2017.05.17	Shonan Bellmare	0-3	Avispa Fukuoka	Shonan BMW Stadium Hiratsuka	8,598
15	2017.05.21	Matsumoto Yamaga FC	1-2	Shonan Bellmare	Matsumotodaira Park Stadium	13,343
16	2017.05.27	Shonan Bellmare	0-1	Montedio Yamagata	Shonan BMW Stadium Hiratsuka	9,118
17	2017.06.03	Shonan Bellmare	1-1	V-Varen Nagasaki	Shonan BMW Stadium Hiratsuka	7,670
18	2017.06.10	Tokushima Vortis	0-1	Shonan Bellmare	Pocarisweat Stadium	4,342
19	2017.06.17	Shonan Bellmare	1-0	Kyoto Sanga FC	Shonan BMW Stadium Hiratsuka	9,050
20	2017.06.25	Yokohama FC	0-1	Shonan Bellmare	NHK Spring Mitsuzawa Football Stadium	8,656
21	2017.07.01	Shonan Bellmare	2-1	Nagoya Grampus	Shonan BMW Stadium Hiratsuka	11,070
22	2017.07.08	Oita Trinita	0-0	Shonan Bellmare	Oita Bank Dome	8,827
23	2017.07.16	Shonan Bellmare	2-0	Tokyo Verdy	Shonan BMW Stadium Hiratsuka	9,820
24	2017.07.22	Montedio Yamagata	3-0	Shonan Bellmare	ND Soft Stadium Yamagata	7,529
25	2017.07.29	Shonan Bellmare	2-0	Tokushima Vortis	Shonan BMW Stadium Hiratsuka	7,744
26	2017.08.05	Shonan Bellmare	2-1	Matsumoto Yamaga FC	Shonan BMW Stadium Hiratsuka	9,088
27	2017.08.11	V-Varen Nagasaki	0-2	Shonan Bellmare	Transcosmos Stadium Nagasaki	6,072
28	2017.08.16	JEF United Chiba	0-1	Shonan Bellmare	Fukuda Denshi Arena	12,485
29	2017.08.20	Shonan Bellmare	0-0	Roasso Kumamoto	Shonan BMW Stadium Hiratsuka	8,027
30	2017.08.26	Thespakusatsu Gunma	0-2	Shonan Bellmare	Shoda Shoyu Stadium Gunma	5,349
31	2017.09.02	Shonan Bellmare	2-2	Yokohama FC	Shonan BMW Stadium Hiratsuka	10,099
32	2017.09.09	Renofa Yamaguchi FC	3-5	Shonan Bellmare	Ishin Memorial Park Stadium	4,858
33	2017.09.16	Shonan Bellmare	1-0	Kamatamare Sanuki	Shonan BMW Stadium Hiratsuka	4,453
34	2017.09.23	Kyoto Sanga FC	0-0	Shonan Bellmare	Kyoto Nishikyogoku Athletic Stadium	6,513
35	2017.09.30	Shonan Bellmare	4-2	Zweigen Kanazawa	Shonan BMW Stadium Hiratsuka	6,904
36	2017.10.07	Shonan Bellmare	3-0	Mito HollyHock	Shonan BMW Stadium Hiratsuka	6,629
37	2017.10.15	Nagoya Grampus	3-2	Shonan Bellmare	Paloma Mizuho Stadium	14,567
38	2017.10.21	Shonan Bellmare	1-0	Ehime FC	Shonan BMW Stadium Hiratsuka	5,896
39	2017.10.29	Shonan Bellmare	1-1	Fagiano Okayama	Shonan BMW Stadium Hiratsuka	8,780
40	2017.11.05	Avispa Fukuoka	2-1	Shonan Bellmare	Level5 Stadium	16,336
41	2017.11.11	FC Gifu	1-1	Shonan Bellmare	Gifu Nagaragawa Stadium	8,250
42	2017.11.19	Shonan Bellmare	1-1	FC Machida Zelvia	Shonan BMW Stadium Hiratsuka	12,480
