= Haruhiko Takimoto =

Japanese footballer

Haruhiko Takimoto 滝本 晴彦
Personal information
- Full name: Haruhiko Takimoto
- Date of birth: 20 May 1997 (age 29)
- Place of birth: Ibaraki, Japan
- Height: 1.90 m (6 ft 3 in)
- Position: Goalkeeper

Team information
- Current team: FC Imabari
- Number: 16

Youth career
- 2007–2015: Kashiwa Reysol

Senior career*
Years	Team	Apps	(Gls)
2016–2022	Kashiwa Reysol	2	(0)
2022	→ FC Imabari (loan)	4	(0)
2023–	FC Imabari	0	(0)
- * Club domestic league appearances and goals as of 16:12, 10 September 2023 (UTC)

Haruhiko Takimoto (滝本 晴彦, Takimoto Haruhiko; born May 20, 1997) is a Japanese football player who plays as Goalkeeper and currently plays for FC Imabari.

== Career ==
After growing for eight years in Kashiwa Reysol youth ranks, Takimoto was promoted to the top team in 2016.

== Club statistics ==
Updated to end of 2018 season.

Club performance			League		Cup		League Cup		Continental		Total	
Season	Club	League	Apps	Goals	Apps	Goals	Apps	Goals	Apps	Goals	Apps	Goals
Japan			League		Emperor's Cup		J. League Cup		AFC		Total	
2016	Kashiwa Reysol	J1 League	0	0	0	0	0	0	–		0	0
2017	Kashiwa Reysol	J1 League	0	0	0	0	0	0	–		0	0
2018	Kashiwa Reysol	J1 League	0	0	0	0	4	0	1	0	5	0
Total			0	0	0	0	4	0	1	0	5	0
