= Felipe Bortolucci =

Brazilian footballer (born 1993)

Personal information
- Full name: Felipe Bortolucci Pires
- Date of birth: August 21, 1993 (age 33)
- Place of birth: Brazil
- Height: 1.94 m (6 ft 4 1/2 in)
- Position: Defender

Senior career*
Years	Team	Apps	(Gls)
2015	Tochigi SC	10	(0)
- * Club domestic league appearances and goals as of December 31, 2015

Felipe Bortolucci Pires (born August 21, 1993), sometimes known as just Felipe, is a Brazilian football player.

== Playing career ==
Felipe Bortolucci played for J2 League club; Tochigi SC in 2015 season.
