= Kazuki Yamaguchi (footballer, born 1995) =

Japanese footballer

Kazuki Yamaguchi 山口 和樹
Personal information
- Full name: Kazuki Yamaguchi
- Date of birth: May 15, 1995 (age 31)
- Place of birth: Nagoya, Japan
- Height: 1.55 m (5 ft 1 in)
- Position: Forward

Team information
- Current team: AC Nagano Parceiro
- Number: 18

Youth career
- Nagoya Grampus
- Aichi FC
- Kashiwa Reysol
- 2011–2013: Aviation High School

College career
Years	Team	Apps	(Gls)
2014–2017	Kokushikan University		

Senior career*
Years	Team	Apps	(Gls)
2018–2019	Shonan Bellmare	5	(0)
2020–2021	FC Ryukyu	22	(0)
2021–2023	Nagano Parceiro	17	(1)
2023–	ReinMeer Aomori	0	(0)
Medal record
Shonan Bellmare
Winner	J.League Cup	2018
- * Club domestic league appearances and goals as of 01:48, 28 August 2023 (UTC)

Kazuki Yamaguchi (山口 和樹, Yamaguchi Kazuki; born May 15, 1995) is a Japanese football player for ReinMeer Aomori.

== Career ==
Kazuki Yamaguchi signed for Shonan Bellmare in September 2017 to play for the Kanagawa-based club in 2018 season.

== Career statistics ==
Updated to 18 February 2019.

Appearances and goals by club, season and competition
Club	Season	League			Emperor's Cup		J.League Cup		Total	
Club	Season	Division	Apps	Goals	Apps	Goals	Apps	Goals	Apps	Goals
Shonan Bellmare	2018	J1 League	3	0	0	0	3	0	6	0
Career total			3	0	0	0	3	0	6	0
