= 2014 Shonan Bellmare season =

Shonan Bellmare
2014 season
- Manager: Cho Kwi-jea
- Stadium: Shonan BMW Stadium Hiratsuka
- J2 League: 1st

2014 Shonan Bellmare season.

== J2 League ==
Match	Date	Team	Score	Team	Venue	Attendance
1	2014.03.02	Shonan Bellmare	1-0	Montedio Yamagata	Shonan BMW Stadium Hiratsuka	7,234
2	2014.03.09	V-Varen Nagasaki	0-3	Shonan Bellmare	Nagasaki Stadium	4,294
3	2014.03.16	Shonan Bellmare	2-0	Consadole Sapporo	Shonan BMW Stadium Hiratsuka	8,269
4	2014.03.22	FC Gifu	2-3	Shonan Bellmare	Gifu Nagaragawa Stadium	7,222
5	2014.03.30	Matsumoto Yamaga FC	1-4	Shonan Bellmare	Matsumotodaira Park Stadium	9,124
6	2014.04.05	Shonan Bellmare	2-0	Fagiano Okayama	Shonan BMW Stadium Hiratsuka	7,117
7	2014.04.13	JEF United Chiba	0-6	Shonan Bellmare	Fukuda Denshi Arena	9,305
8	2014.04.20	Shonan Bellmare	4-0	Oita Trinita	Shonan BMW Stadium Hiratsuka	7,039
9	2014.04.26	Yokohama FC	1-3	Shonan Bellmare	NHK Spring Mitsuzawa Football Stadium	6,053
10	2014.04.29	Shonan Bellmare	3-0	Kyoto Sanga FC	Shonan BMW Stadium Hiratsuka	7,923
11	2014.05.03	Mito HollyHock	0-1	Shonan Bellmare	K's denki Stadium Mito	5,504
12	2014.05.06	Shonan Bellmare	2-1	Tochigi SC	Shonan BMW Stadium Hiratsuka	9,185
13	2014.05.11	Roasso Kumamoto	1-3	Shonan Bellmare	Umakana-Yokana Stadium	6,517
14	2014.05.18	Shonan Bellmare	2-0	Avispa Fukuoka	Shonan BMW Stadium Hiratsuka	8,069
15	2014.05.24	Ehime FC	1-0	Shonan Bellmare	Ningineer Stadium	2,851
16	2014.05.31	Shonan Bellmare	1-0	Tokyo Verdy	Shonan BMW Stadium Hiratsuka	12,400
17	2014.06.07	Kataller Toyama	0-1	Shonan Bellmare	Toyama Stadium	4,596
18	2014.06.14	Shonan Bellmare	3-1	Kamatamare Sanuki	Shonan BMW Stadium Hiratsuka	6,827
19	2014.06.21	Júbilo Iwata	1-2	Shonan Bellmare	Yamaha Stadium	12,994
20	2014.06.28	Shonan Bellmare	2-0	Giravanz Kitakyushu	Shonan BMW Stadium Hiratsuka	6,217
21	2014.07.05	Thespakusatsu Gunma	0-1	Shonan Bellmare	Shoda Shoyu Stadium Gunma	3,986
22	2014.07.20	Shonan Bellmare	2-1	Roasso Kumamoto	Shonan BMW Stadium Hiratsuka	7,519
23	2014.07.26	Shonan Bellmare	2-0	Kataller Toyama	Shonan BMW Stadium Hiratsuka	7,312
24	2014.07.30	Avispa Fukuoka	0-0	Shonan Bellmare	Level5 Stadium	3,883
25	2014.08.03	Shonan Bellmare	1-1	JEF United Chiba	Shonan BMW Stadium Hiratsuka	8,637
26	2014.08.10	Fagiano Okayama	0-0	Shonan Bellmare	Kanko Stadium	9,811
27	2014.08.17	Tochigi SC	0-3	Shonan Bellmare	Tochigi Green Stadium	6,084
28	2014.08.24	Shonan Bellmare	1-1	Júbilo Iwata	Shonan BMW Stadium Hiratsuka	14,155
29	2014.08.31	Montedio Yamagata	1-3	Shonan Bellmare	ND Soft Stadium Yamagata	6,495
30	2014.09.06	Shonan Bellmare	1-1	Matsumoto Yamaga FC	Shonan BMW Stadium Hiratsuka	13,049
31	2014.09.14	Kamatamare Sanuki	0-2	Shonan Bellmare	Kagawa Marugame Stadium	3,510
32	2014.09.20	Shonan Bellmare	4-2	Mito HollyHock	Shonan BMW Stadium Hiratsuka	7,101
33	2014.09.23	Kyoto Sanga FC	2-2	Shonan Bellmare	Kyoto Nishikyogoku Athletic Stadium	7,976
34	2014.09.28	Shonan Bellmare	0-0	FC Gifu	Shonan BMW Stadium Hiratsuka	8,047
35	2014.10.04	Shonan Bellmare	3-0	Ehime FC	Shonan BMW Stadium Hiratsuka	8,156
36	2014.10.11	Tokyo Verdy	0-0	Shonan Bellmare	Ajinomoto Stadium	8,467
37	2014.10.19	Shonan Bellmare	1-2	V-Varen Nagasaki	Shonan BMW Stadium Hiratsuka	8,691
38	2014.10.26	Consadole Sapporo	2-0	Shonan Bellmare	Sapporo Dome	11,896
39	2014.11.01	Shonan Bellmare	1-0	Thespakusatsu Gunma	Shonan BMW Stadium Hiratsuka	5,963
40	2014.11.09	Giravanz Kitakyushu	0-4	Shonan Bellmare	Honjo Stadium	4,596
41	2014.11.15	Shonan Bellmare	4-1	Yokohama FC	Shonan BMW Stadium Hiratsuka	9,131
42	2014.11.23	Oita Trinita	2-3	Shonan Bellmare	Oita Bank Dome	12,770
