= Fábio Amorim =

Brazilian footballer (born 1990)

Personal information
- Full name: Fabio da Conceicao Amorim
- Date of birth: February 28, 1990 (age 36)
- Place of birth: Brazil
- Height: 1.73 m (5 ft 8 in)
- Position: Forward

Senior career*
Years	Team	Apps	(Gls)
2015	Shonan Bellmare	1	(0)
- * Club domestic league appearances and goals as of December 31, 2015

Fabio da Conceicao Amorim (born February 28, 1990) is a Brazilian football player.

== Playing career ==
Amorim played for J1 League club; Shonan Bellmare in 2015 season.
