= 2017 Kashiwa Reysol season =

Kashiwa Reysol
2017 season
- Manager: Takahiro Shimotaira
- Stadium: Hitachi Kashiwa Stadium
- J1 League: 4th

2017 Kashiwa Reysol season.

== J1 League ==
=== League table ===
| Pos | Team | Pld | W | D | L | GF | GA | GD | Pts | Qualification or relegation |
|---|---|---|---|---|---|---|---|---|---|---|
| 2 | Kashima Antlers | 34 | 23 | 3 | 8 | 53 | 31 | +22 | 72 | Champions League group stage |
| 3 | Cerezo Osaka | 34 | 19 | 6 | 9 | 65 | 43 | +22 | 63 | Champions League group stage |
| 4 | Kashiwa Reysol | 34 | 18 | 8 | 8 | 49 | 33 | +16 | 62 | Champions League play-off round (Note: The winner of the 2017 Emperor's Cup qualified for the group stage of the 2018 AFC Champions League. Since the Emperor's Cup winner Cerezo Osaka had already qualified for the AFC Champions League, the play-off round spot was awarded to the fourth-placed team.) |
| 5 | Yokohama F. Marinos | 34 | 17 | 8 | 9 | 45 | 36 | +9 | 59 | |
| 6 | Júbilo Iwata | 34 | 16 | 10 | 8 | 50 | 30 | +20 | 58 | |

Source: Meiji Yasuda J1 League
Rules for classification: 1) Points; 2) Goal difference; 3) Goals scored

=== Match details ===
J1 League match details
| Match | Date | Team | Score | Team | Venue | Attendance |
|---|---|---|---|---|---|---|
| 1 | 2017.02.25 | Sagan Tosu | 1-3 | Kashiwa Reysol | Best Amenity Stadium | 14,355 |
| 2 | 2017.03.05 | Kashiwa Reysol | 1-3 | Gamba Osaka | Hitachi Kashiwa Stadium | 13,649 |
| 3 | 2017.03.10 | Kawasaki Frontale | 2-1 | Kashiwa Reysol | Kawasaki Todoroki Stadium | 18,608 |
| 4 | 2017.03.18 | Kashiwa Reysol | 0-1 | Vegalta Sendai | Hitachi Kashiwa Stadium | 9,905 |
| 5 | 2017.04.01 | Sanfrecce Hiroshima | 0-2 | Kashiwa Reysol | Edion Stadium Hiroshima | 13,639 |
| 6 | 2017.04.08 | Kashiwa Reysol | 0-2 | Shimizu S-Pulse | Hitachi Kashiwa Stadium | 9,432 |
| 7 | 2017.04.16 | Vissel Kobe | 1-2 | Kashiwa Reysol | Noevir Stadium Kobe | 14,377 |
| 8 | 2017.04.22 | Kashiwa Reysol | 2-0 | Yokohama F. Marinos | Hitachi Kashiwa Stadium | 10,268 |
| 9 | 2017.04.30 | Albirex Niigata | 0-1 | Kashiwa Reysol | Denka Big Swan Stadium | 19,782 |
| 10 | 2017.05.06 | Kashiwa Reysol | 1-0 | Cerezo Osaka | Hitachi Kashiwa Stadium | 14,015 |
| 11 | 2017.05.14 | FC Tokyo | 1-2 | Kashiwa Reysol | Ajinomoto Stadium | 23,950 |
| 12 | 2017.05.20 | Júbilo Iwata | 0-2 | Kashiwa Reysol | Yamaha Stadium | 13,470 |
| 13 | 2017.05.27 | Kashiwa Reysol | 4-2 | Omiya Ardija | Hitachi Kashiwa Stadium | 10,807 |
| 14 | 2017.06.04 | Kashiwa Reysol | 1-0 | Urawa Reds | Hitachi Kashiwa Stadium | 14,096 |
| 15 | 2017.06.17 | Ventforet Kofu | 0-0 | Kashiwa Reysol | Yamanashi Chuo Bank Stadium | 10,566 |
| 16 | 2017.06.25 | Kashiwa Reysol | 2-1 | Hokkaido Consadole Sapporo | Hitachi Kashiwa Stadium | 9,769 |
| 17 | 2017.07.02 | Kashiwa Reysol | 2-3 | Kashima Antlers | Hitachi Kashiwa Stadium | 13,945 |
| 18 | 2017.07.08 | Cerezo Osaka | 2-1 | Kashiwa Reysol | Kincho Stadium | 16,759 |
| 19 | 2017.07.30 | Vegalta Sendai | 1-1 | Kashiwa Reysol | Yurtec Stadium Sendai | 14,202 |
| 20 | 2017.08.05 | Kashiwa Reysol | 3-1 | Vissel Kobe | Hitachi Kashiwa Stadium | 13,284 |
| 21 | 2017.08.09 | Kashiwa Reysol | 0-0 | Sagan Tosu | Hitachi Kashiwa Stadium | 9,682 |
| 22 | 2017.08.13 | Shimizu S-Pulse | 1-4 | Kashiwa Reysol | IAI Stadium Nihondaira | 17,482 |
| 23 | 2017.08.19 | Gamba Osaka | 0-1 | Kashiwa Reysol | Suita City Football Stadium | 21,582 |
| 24 | 2017.08.26 | Kashiwa Reysol | 1-1 | Albirex Niigata | Hitachi Kashiwa Stadium | 12,760 |
| 25 | 2017.09.09 | Urawa Reds | 1-2 | Kashiwa Reysol | Saitama Stadium 2002 | 31,619 |
| 26 | 2017.09.16 | Yokohama F. Marinos | 1-1 | Kashiwa Reysol | Nissan Stadium | 20,844 |
| 27 | 2017.09.23 | Kashiwa Reysol | 4-1 | FC Tokyo | Hitachi Kashiwa Stadium | 13,909 |
| 28 | 2017.09.30 | Kashiwa Reysol | 0-1 | Ventforet Kofu | Hitachi Kashiwa Stadium | 11,123 |
| 29 | 2017.10.14 | Hokkaido Consadole Sapporo | 3-0 | Kashiwa Reysol | Sapporo Atsubetsu Stadium | 9,614 |
| 30 | 2017.10.21 | Omiya Ardija | 1-1 | Kashiwa Reysol | NACK5 Stadium Omiya | 9,752 |
| 31 | 2017.10.29 | Kashiwa Reysol | 2-2 | Kawasaki Frontale | Hitachi Kashiwa Stadium | 9,512 |
| 32 | 2017.11.18 | Kashiwa Reysol | 1-0 | Júbilo Iwata | Hitachi Kashiwa Stadium | 11,545 |
| 33 | 2017.11.26 | Kashima Antlers | 0-0 | Kashiwa Reysol | Kashima Soccer Stadium | 36,080 |
| 34 | 2017.12.02 | Kashiwa Reysol | 1-0 | Sanfrecce Hiroshima | Hitachi Kashiwa Stadium | 13,235 |
