= 2016 Kashiwa Reysol season =

Kashiwa Reysol
2016 season
- Manager: Milton Mendes; Takahiro Shimotaira
- Stadium: Hitachi Kashiwa Stadium
- J1 League: 8th
- Emperor's Cup: 4th round
- J.League Cup: group stage

2016 Kashiwa Reysol season.

== J1 League ==
=== League table ===
Pos	Team	Pld	W	D	L	GF	GA	GD	Pts
7	Vissel Kobe	34	16	7	11	56	43	+13	55
8	Kashiwa Reysol	34	15	9	10	52	44	+8	54
9	FC Tokyo	34	15	7	12	39	39	0	52

Source: Meiji Yasuda J1 League
Rules for classification: 1) Points; 2) Goal difference; 3) Goals scored.

=== Match details ===
J1 League match details
Match	Date	Team	Score	Team	Venue	Attendance
1-1	2016.02.27	Kashiwa Reysol	1-2	Urawa Reds	Hitachi Kashiwa Stadium	13,416
1-2	2016.03.05	Omiya Ardija	2-0	Kashiwa Reysol	NACK5 Stadium Omiya	12,696
1-3	2016.03.12	Kashiwa Reysol	2-2	Júbilo Iwata	Hitachi Kashiwa Stadium	10,280
1-4	2016.03.19	Albirex Niigata	2-2	Kashiwa Reysol	Denka Big Swan Stadium	14,627
1-5	2016.04.02	Sagan Tosu	1-1	Kashiwa Reysol	Best Amenity Stadium	9,144
1-6	2016.04.10	Kashiwa Reysol	1-0	FC Tokyo	Hitachi Kashiwa Stadium	10,470
1-7	2016.04.15	Gamba Osaka	0-1	Kashiwa Reysol	Suita City Football Stadium	13,731
1-8	2016.04.24	Kashima Antlers	0-2	Kashiwa Reysol	Kashima Soccer Stadium	15,914
1-9	2016.04.30	Kashiwa Reysol	2-0	Vissel Kobe	Hitachi Kashiwa Stadium	11,382
1-10	2016.05.04	Ventforet Kofu	0-2	Kashiwa Reysol	Yamanashi Chuo Bank Stadium	11,338
1-11	2016.05.08	Kashiwa Reysol	1-3	Kawasaki Frontale	Hitachi Kashiwa Stadium	13,977
1-12	2016.05.13	Sanfrecce Hiroshima	0-0	Kashiwa Reysol	Edion Stadium Hiroshima	8,956
1-13	2016.05.21	Kashiwa Reysol	3-2	Avispa Fukuoka	Hitachi Kashiwa Stadium	8,011
1-14	2016.05.29	Yokohama F. Marinos	3-0	Kashiwa Reysol	Nissan Stadium	20,554
1-15	2016.06.11	Kashiwa Reysol	0-2	Vegalta Sendai	Hitachi Kashiwa Stadium	9,534
1-16	2016.06.18	Nagoya Grampus	1-1	Kashiwa Reysol	Paloma Mizuho Stadium	10,517
1-17	2016.06.25	Kashiwa Reysol	1-1	Shonan Bellmare	Hitachi Kashiwa Stadium	9,643
2-1	2016.07.02	Kashiwa Reysol	1-0	Albirex Niigata	Hitachi Kashiwa Stadium	10,435
2-2	2016.07.09	Urawa Reds	2-0	Kashiwa Reysol	Saitama Stadium 2002	27,875
2-3	2016.07.13	Kashiwa Reysol	3-3	Sanfrecce Hiroshima	Hitachi Kashiwa Stadium	7,090
2-4	2016.07.17	FC Tokyo	0-1	Kashiwa Reysol	Ajinomoto Stadium	22,374
2-5	2016.07.23	Kashiwa Reysol	3-2	Gamba Osaka	Hitachi Kashiwa Stadium	13,808
2-6	2016.07.30	Júbilo Iwata	1-2	Kashiwa Reysol	Yamaha Stadium	14,353
2-7	2016.08.06	Kashiwa Reysol	1-2	Yokohama F. Marinos	Hitachi Kashiwa Stadium	12,170
2-8	2016.08.13	Vegalta Sendai	4-2	Kashiwa Reysol	Yurtec Stadium Sendai	16,873
2-9	2016.08.20	Kashiwa Reysol	3-1	Nagoya Grampus	Hitachi Kashiwa Stadium	8,577
2-10	2016.08.27	Kawasaki Frontale	2-5	Kashiwa Reysol	Kawasaki Todoroki Stadium	21,791
2-11	2016.09.10	Kashiwa Reysol	2-0	Kashima Antlers	Hitachi Kashiwa Stadium	12,815
2-12	2016.09.17	Vissel Kobe	1-1	Kashiwa Reysol	Kobe Universiade Memorial Stadium	22,059
2-13	2016.09.25	Kashiwa Reysol	1-0	Ventforet Kofu	Hitachi Kashiwa Stadium	9,043
2-14	2016.10.01	Shonan Bellmare	0-0	Kashiwa Reysol	Shonan BMW Stadium Hiratsuka	10,665
2-15	2016.10.22	Kashiwa Reysol	2-3	Sagan Tosu	Hitachi Kashiwa Stadium	10,140
2-16	2016.10.29	Kashiwa Reysol	1-2	Omiya Ardija	Hitachi Kashiwa Stadium	11,583
2-17	2016.11.03	Avispa Fukuoka	0-4	Kashiwa Reysol	Level5 Stadium	13,042
