= Cho Kwi-jae =

South Korean footballer and manager

Personal information
- Full name: Cho Kwi-jae
- Date of birth: January 16, 1969 (age 57)
- Place of birth: Kyoto, Japan
- Height: 1.76 m (5 ft 9 in)
- Position: Defender

Team information
- Current team: Urawa Red Diamonds (manager)

Youth career
- 1984–1986: Rakuhoku High School

College career
Years	Team	Apps	(Gls)
1987–1990	Waseda University		

Senior career*
Years	Team	Apps	(Gls)
1991–1993	Kashiwa Reysol	72	(4)
1994–1995	Urawa Red Diamonds	32	(2)
1996–1997	Vissel Kobe	34	(4)

Managerial career
- 2012–2019: Shonan Bellmare
- 2021–2026: Kyoto Sanga
- 2026–: Urawa Red Diamonds
- * Club domestic league appearances and goals

- Cho Kwi-jae
- Hangul: 조귀재
- Hanja: 曺貴裁
- RR: Jo Gwijae
- MR: Cho Kwijae

Cho Kwi-jae (born 16 January 1969) is a former Zainichi Korean football player and manager who is currently the manager of J1 League club Urawa Red Diamonds.

== Club statistics ==
Club performance			League		Cup		League Cup		Total	
Season	Club	League	Apps	Goals	Apps	Goals	Apps	Goals	Apps	Goals
Japan			League		Emperor's Cup		J.League Cup		Total	
1991/92	Hitachi	JSL Division 1	16	0			2	0	18	0
1992	Hitachi	Football League	13	0			-		13	0
1993	Kashiwa Reysol	Football League	18	0	1	0	4	0	23	0
Total			47	0	1	0	6	0	55	0
1994	Urawa Reds	J1 League	39	0	3	0	2	0	44	0
1995	Urawa Reds	J1 League	26	0	0	0	-		26	0
Total			65	0	3	0	2	0	70	0
1996	Vissel Kobe	Football League	16	0	3	0	-		19	0
1997	Vissel Kobe	J1 League	5	0	0	0	4	0	9	0
Total			21	0	3	0	4	0	28	0
Career Total			133	0	7	0	12	0	152	0

== Managerial statistics ==
Team	From	To	Record				
Team	From	To	G	W	D	L	Win %
Shonan Bellmare	1 February 2012	8 October 2019	340	145	78	117	42.65
Kyoto Sanga	1 February 2021	23 May 2026	237	101	52	84	42.62
Total			577	246	130	201	42.63

== Honours ==
=== Managerial ===
Shonan Bellmare

- J2 League: 2014, 2017
- J.League Cup: 2018
