= 2021–22 Al-Faisaly FC season =

Al-Faisaly
2021–22 season
- President: Fahd Al-Medlej
- Manager: Paolo Tramezzani (until 7 October); Daniel Ramos (from 7 October until 24 February); Marinos Ouzounidis (from 27 February)
- Stadium: Al Majma'ah Sports City
- SPL: 14th (relegated)
- King Cup: Round of 16 (knocked out by Al-Ahli)
- Champions League: Round of 16
- Super Cup: Runners-up (knocked out by Al-Hilal)
- Top goalscorer: League: Júlio Tavares (9 goals); All: Júlio Tavares (11 goals)
- Highest home attendance: 6,410 (vs. Al-Ettifaq, 28 May 2022)
- Lowest home attendance: 1,764 (vs. Al-Ittihad, 27 August 2021)
- Average home league attendance: 4,419
Home colours	Away colours	Third colours
- All statistics correct as of 27 June 2022.

The 2021–22 season is Al-Faisaly's 13th non-consecutive season in the Pro League and their 68th season in existence. The club will participate in the Pro League, the King Cup, the AFC Champions League and the Saudi Super Cup.

The season covers the period from 1 July 2021 to 30 June 2022.

== Players ==
=== Squad information ===
As of 1 February 2022

Note: Flags indicate national team as defined under FIFA eligibility rules; some limited exceptions apply. Players may hold more than one non-FIFA nationality.

No.	Pos.	Nation	Player
1	GK	KSA	Mohammed Al-Hassawi
3	DF	BRA	Igor Rossi
5	DF	KSA	Mohammed Al-Amri
6	MF	NED	Hicham Faik
7	MF	BRA	Ismael
8	MF	KSA	Abdulmajeed Al-Swat
9	FW	AUS	Martin Boyle
10	MF	BRA	Rossi
12	DF	KSA	Hussain Qassem
13	DF	KSA	Ahmed Assiri
14	FW	KSA	Saleh Al Abbas
15	MF	KSA	Ahmed Ashraf
17	DF	KSA	Saleh Al-Qumayzi
18	MF	KSA	Shaye Sharahili
19	FW	CPV	Júlio Tavares
21	MF	KSA	Abdulaziz Dhafir

No.	Pos.	Nation	Player
22	DF	KSA	Yassin Barnawi
25	MF	KSA	Ismail Omar
26	GK	KSA	Mustafa Malayekah
28	GK	KSA	Ahmed Al-Kassar
30	GK	KSA	Sultan Al-Qahtani
31	DF	KSA	Ali Al-Absi
35	DF	KSA	Ali Meadi
37	MF	BRA	Clayson
39	MF	KSA	Abdulrahman Al-Dawsari
55	DF	KSA	Mohammed Al-Nukhylan
77	MF	KSA	Khalid Kaabi
78	DF	KSA	Khaled Daghriri
80	FW	KSA	Mohammed Al-Saiari
87	MF	KSA	Meshal Al-Sebyani
88	MF	KSA	Abdulaziz Al-Sharid
99	DF	KSA	Waleed Al-Ahmed

=== Out on loan ===
Note: Flags indicate national team as defined under FIFA eligibility rules; some limited exceptions apply. Players may hold more than one non-FIFA nationality.

No.	Pos.	Nation	Player
2	DF	KSA	Abdullah Al-Hassan (at Al-Jabalain until 30 June 2022)
42	MF	KSA	Hamed Fallatah (at Al-Tai until 30 June 2022)
70	MF	KSA	Ahmed Al-Anzi (at Al-Adalah until 30 June 2022)
—	GK	KSA	Taher Al-Hajji (at Al-Khaleej until 30 June 2022)

No.	Pos.	Nation	Player
—	MF	KSA	Abdullah Al-Qahtani (at Abha until 30 June 2022)
—	MF	KSA	Hussain Al Quraish (at Al-Safa until 30 June 2022)
—	MF	KSA	Hamoud Al-Shammari (at Al-Jandal until 30 June 2022)
—	FW	KSA	Yazid Joshan (at Zemun until 30 June 2022)

== Transfers and loans ==
=== Transfers in ===
Entry date	Position	No.	Player	From club	Fee	Ref.
30 June 2021	GK	22	(Saudi Arabia) Taher Al-Hejji	(Saudi Arabia) Al-Khaleej	End of loan	
30 June 2021	DF	13	(Saudi Arabia) Ali Meadi	(Saudi Arabia) Abha	End of loan	
30 June 2021	DF	–	(Saudi Arabia) Hassan Al-Jubairi	(Saudi Arabia) Al-Tai	End of loan	
30 June 2021	DF	–	(Saudi Arabia) Adel Hazazi	(Saudi Arabia) Al-Diriyah	End of loan	
30 June 2021	MF	5	(Saudi Arabia) Hussain Al Quraish	(Saudi Arabia) Al-Nahda	End of loan	
30 June 2021	MF	7	(Saudi Arabia) Hamoud Al-Shammari	(Saudi Arabia) Al-Jeel	End of loan	
30 June 2021	MF	10	(Saudi Arabia) Abdullah Al-Qahtani	(Saudi Arabia) Abha	End of loan	
30 June 2021	MF	14	(Saudi Arabia) Bader Bashir	(Saudi Arabia) Hajer	End of loan	
30 June 2021	MF	42	(Saudi Arabia) Hamed Fallatah	(Saudi Arabia) Al-Nahda	End of loan	
1 July 2021	DF	17	(Saudi Arabia) Saleh Al-Qumayzi	(Saudi Arabia) Al-Ettifaq	Free	
1 July 2021	MF	39	(Saudi Arabia) Abdulrahman Al-Dawsari	(Saudi Arabia) Al-Nassr	Free	
6 July 2021	DF	22	(Saudi Arabia) Yassin Barnawi	(Saudi Arabia) Al-Taawoun	Free	
18 July 2021	DF	5	(Saudi Arabia) Mohammed Al-Amri	(Saudi Arabia) Al-Wehda	Free	
25 July 2021	MF	7	(Brazil) Ismael	(Russia) Akhmat Grozny	Free	
7 August 2021	MF	8	(Saudi Arabia) Abdulmajeed Al-Swat	(Saudi Arabia) Al-Ittihad	$533,000	
31 August 2021	FW	14	(Saudi Arabia) Saleh Al Abbas	(Saudi Arabia) Al-Nassr	$650,000	
7 January 2022	DF	13	(Saudi Arabia) Ahmed Assiri	(Saudi Arabia) Al-Taawoun	Free	
13 January 2022	MF	10	(Brazil) Rossi	(Brazil) Bahia	Free	
21 January 2022	FW	9	(Australia) Martin Boyle	(Scotland) Hibernian	$4,000,000	
30 January 2022	MF	37	(Brazil) Clayson	(Brazil) Bahia	Free	

=== Transfers out ===
Exit date	Position	No.	Player	To club	Fee	Ref.
30 June 2021	DF	14	(Saudi Arabia) Ali Majrashi	(Saudi Arabia) Al-Shabab	End of loan	
30 June 2021	MF	8	(Saudi Arabia) Khaled Al-Sumairi	(Saudi Arabia) Al-Ittihad	End of loan	
11 July 2021	DF	–	(Saudi Arabia) Hassan Al-Jubairi	(Saudi Arabia) Al-Tai	Undisclosed	
25 July 2021	DF	27	(Saudi Arabia) Awadh Khrees	(Saudi Arabia) Al-Adalah	Free	
19 August 2021	MF	52	(Kazakhstan) Alexander Merkel	(Turkey) Gaziantep	Free	
19 January 2022	MF	11	(Brazil) Guilherme	(United Arab Emirates) Al-Dhafra	Free	
31 January 2022	DF	4	(Brazil) Raphael Silva		Released	
31 January 2022	MF	23	(France) Romain Amalfitano		Released	

=== Loans out ===
Start date	End date	Position	No.	Player	To club	Fee	Ref.
23 July 2021	End of season	MF	42	(Saudi Arabia) Hamed Fallatah	(Saudi Arabia) Al-Tai	None	
2 August 2021	End of season	MF	5	(Saudi Arabia) Hussain Al Quraish	(Saudi Arabia) Al-Safa	None	
8 August 2021	End of season	GK	22	(Saudi Arabia) Taher Al-Hajji	(Saudi Arabia) Al-Khaleej	None	
31 August 2021	End of season	MF	10	(Saudi Arabia) Abdullah Al-Qahtani	(Saudi Arabia) Abha	None	
1 September 2021	End of season	MF	7	(Saudi Arabia) Hamoud Al-Shammari	(Saudi Arabia) Al-Jandal	None	
1 September 2021	End of season	FW	–	(Saudi Arabia) Yazeed Joshan	(Serbia) Zemun	None	
22 January 2022	End of season	DF	2	(Saudi Arabia) Abdullah Al-Hassan	(Saudi Arabia) Al-Jabalain	None	
30 January 2022	End of season	MF	70	(Saudi Arabia) Ahmed Al-Anzi	(Saudi Arabia) Al-Adalah	None	

== Pre-season ==
17 July 2021 Friendly	Al-Faisaly (Saudi Arabia)	2–0	(Serbia) Radnički Niš	Subotica, Serbia
18:30 CEST	Merkel; Tavares	Report		Stadium: Subotica City Stadium

21 July 2021 Friendly	Al-Faisaly (Saudi Arabia)	3–1	(Serbia) Zlatibor Čajetina	Subotica, Serbia
18:30 CEST	Guilherme; Al-Saiari; Dhafer	Report		Stadium: Subotica City Stadium

24 July 2021 Friendly	Al-Faisaly (Saudi Arabia)	0–2	(Romania) CSM Reșița	Užice, Serbia
18:30 CEST		Report	Ndiaye; Mura	Stadium: Užice City Stadium

29 July 2021 Friendly	Al-Faisaly (Saudi Arabia)	2–0	(Serbia) Metalac	Gornji Milanovac, Serbia
18:00 CEST	Amalfitano 16'; Al-Dawsari 70'	Report		Stadium: Stadion Metalac

8 August 2021 Friendly	Al-Hilal (Saudi Arabia)	3–2	(Saudi Arabia) Al-Faisaly	Riyadh, Saudi Arabia
20:00 AST	Gomis; Carrillo; Al-Shehri	Report	Goal	Stadium: King Fahd International Stadium

== Competitions ==
=== Overview ===
Competition	Record							
Competition	G	W	D	L	GF	GA	GD	Win %
Pro League	30	7	12	11	28	37	−9	23.33
King Cup	1	0	0	1	1	2	−1	0.00
Champions League	6	2	3	1	5	4	+1	33.33
Super Cup	1	0	1	0	2	2	+0	0.00
Total	38	9	16	13	36	45	−9	23.68

Updated to match played 27 June 2022
Source: Competitions

=== Pro League ===
==== League table ====
Pos	Team	Pld	W	D	L	GF	GA	GD	Pts	Qualification or relegation
12	Al-Taawoun	30	7	13	10	43	48	−5	34 (Note: Head-to-head points: Al-Ettifaq 3, Al-Taawoun 3. Head-to-head goal difference: Al-Ettifaq +2, Al-Taawoun –2.)	
13	Al-Batin	30	8	9	13	31	41	−10	33 (Note: Head-to-head points: Al-Batin 4, Al-Faisaly 1.)	
14	Al-Faisaly (R)	30	7	12	11	28	37	−9	33	Relegation to MS League
15	Al-Ahli (R)	30	6	14	10	38	43	−5	32	Relegation to MS League
16	Al-Hazem (R)	30	4	5	21	23	50	−27	17	Relegation to MS League

Source: spl.com
Rules for classification: 1) Points; 2) Head-to-head points; 3) Head-to-head goal difference; 4) Total goal difference; 5) Total goals scored; 6) Fair-play points (Note: Head-to-head record is used only after all the matches between the teams in question have been played).
(R) Relegated

==== Results summary ====
Overall								Home						Away					
Pld	W	D	L	GF	GA	GD	Pts	W	D	L	GF	GA	GD	W	D	L	GF	GA	GD
30	7	12	11	28	37	−9	33	7	6	2	21	14	+7	0	6	9	7	23	−16

Last updated: 27 June 2022.
Source: spl.com.sa

==== Results by round ====
Round	1	2	3	4	5	6	7	8	9	10	11	12	13	14	15	16	17	18	19	20	21	22	23	24	25	26	27	28	29	30
Ground	A	H	H	A	H	A	H	A	H	A	H	H	A	A	H	H	A	A	H	A	H	A	H	A	H	A	A	H	H	A
Result	D	W	L	L	W	D	D	D	D	L	W	D	L	L	L	D	L	L	W	D	D	L	W	D	W	D	L	D	W	L
Position	10	3	8	11	7	9	9	9	9	10	8	8	10	12	13	14	14	15	11	13	13	14	13	13	11	11	14	13	11	14

Updated to match(es) played on 27 June 2022. Source: spl.com.sa
A = Away; H = Home; W = Win; D = Draw; L = Loss

==== Matches ====
All times are local, AST (UTC+3).

Win Draw Loss Postponed

13 August 2021 1	Al-Ahli	1–1	Al-Faisaly	Jeddah
20:55	Al-Majhad 37'; Hindi (yellow card) 47'; Al-Moasher (yellow card) 55'; Hawsawi (yellow card) 66'	Report	Amalfitano 27'; Qassem (yellow card) 55'; Al-Dawsari (yellow card) 83'; Al-Qumayzi (yellow card) 90+4'	Stadium: King Abdullah Sports City; Attendance: 15,703; Referee: Khaled Al-Teris

19 August 2021 2	Al-Faisaly	2–1	Al-Nassr	Al Majma'ah
20:50	Tavares 45+4' (pen.), 50'; I. Rossi (yellow card) 71'; Amalfitano (yellow card) 90+4'	Report	Talisca 8'	Stadium: Al Majma'ah Sports City; Attendance: 2,616; Referee: Majed Al-Shamrani

27 August 2021 3	Al-Faisaly	1–2	Al-Ittihad	Al Majma'ah
19:00	Ismael (yellow card) 24', (goal) 41'; Al-Qumayzi (yellow card) 53'; I. Rossi (yellow card) 58'; Silva (yellow card) 66'; Qassem (yellow card) 68'	Report	Hegazi 3'; Coronado 45+1'; Al-Aboud (yellow card) 50'; Al-Shamrani (yellow card) 66'; Al-Bishi (yellow card) 90'; Abdulhamid (yellow card) 90+3'	Stadium: Al Majma'ah Sports City; Attendance: 1,764; Referee: Faisal Al-Blwi

11 September 2021 4	Damac	2–0	Al-Faisaly	Abha
18:50	Zelaya 10'; Soudani 52'	Report	Al-Kassar (yellow card) 8'; Ismael (yellow card) 90+5'	Stadium: Prince Sultan bin Abdul Aziz Stadium; Attendance: 1,090; Referee: Sultan Al-Harbi

16 September 2021 5	Al-Faisaly	2–1	Al-Fayha	Al Majma'ah
20:30	Amalfitano 9'; Kaabi (yellow card) 46'; Faik (yellow card) 57'; Tavares 77'; Guilherme (red card) 90+7'	Report	Y. Al-Harbi (yellow card) 42'; Tachtsidis (yellow card) 57'; Mandash 87'	Stadium: Al Majma'ah Sports City; Attendance: 3,101; Referee: Khaled Al-Teris

25 September 2021 6	Al-Raed	1–1	Al-Faisaly	Buraidah
20:25	Al-Fahad (yellow card) 30'; El Berkaoui 81' (pen.)	Report	Tavares 15', (yellow card) 90+2'; Ismael (yellow card) 40'; Al-Kassar (yellow card) 60'; Al-Ahmed (yellow card) 72'; Kaabi (yellow card) 81'	Stadium: King Abdullah Sport City Stadium; Attendance: 4,917; Referee: Abdullah Al-Harbi

1 October 2021 7	Al-Faisaly	2–2	Al-Batin	Al Majma'ah
18:25	Faik (yellow card) 6'; Tavares 52'; Kaabi 90+3'; Al-Saiari (yellow card) 90+5'	Report	Al-Shammari 7'; Al-Rubaie 66'; Mamdouh (yellow card) 84'; Acquah (yellow card) 85'; Campaña (yellow card) 88'; M. Al-Qarni (yellow card) 90+1'	Stadium: Al Majma'ah Sports City; Attendance: 3,812; Referee: Khaled Al-Juhani

17 October 2021 8	Al-Hazem	0–0	Al-Faisaly	Ar Rass
18:15	Abdullah S. (yellow card) 32'; Al-Barakah (yellow card) 85'	Report	Al-Qumayzi (yellow card) 34'; Qassem (yellow card) 44'; I. Rossi (yellow card) 90+5'	Stadium: Al-Hazem Club Stadium; Attendance: 1,092; Referee: Raed Al-Zahrani

22 October 2021 9	Al-Faisaly	2–2	Al-Taawoun	Al Majma'ah
18:05	Guilherme 45' (pen.); Qassem (yellow card) 61'; Amalfitano 89'	Report	Al-Nabit 11'; Santos (yellow card) 19'; Amissi 56', (yellow card) 90'	Stadium: Al Majma'ah Sports City; Attendance: 6,208; Referee: Mohammed Al-Esmaiel

4 November 2021 11	Al-Faisaly	1–0	Abha	Al Majma'ah
17:55	Faik 20'; Al-Amri (yellow card) 32'; Silva (yellow card) 45+1'	Report	Bguir (yellow card) 44'; Suárez (yellow card) 47'; Al Hamsal (yellow card) 57'	Stadium: Al Majma'ah Sports City; Attendance: 6,094; Referee: Sami Al-Jires

20 November 2021 12	Al-Faisaly	0–0	Al-Shabab	Al Majma'ah
17:45	Ismael (yellow card) 65'	Report	Paulinho (yellow card) 18'; Carlos (yellow card) 43'; Al-Harbi (yellow card) 90+1'	Stadium: Al Majma'ah Sports City; Attendance: 6,182; Referee: Mohammed Al-Hoaish

27 November 2021 13	Al-Ettifaq	1–0	Al-Faisaly	Dammam
17:25	Al-Rubaie (yellow card) 21'; Sliti (yellow card) 49', (goal) 50'; Hazazi (yellow card) 63'; Mahnashi (yellow card) 78'	Report	Al-Ahmed (yellow card) 32'	Stadium: Prince Mohamed bin Fahd Stadium; Attendance: 6,783; Referee: Khaled Salwi

26 December 2021 14	Al-Tai	3–1	Al-Faisaly	Ha'il
15:30	Al-Johani (yellow card) 33'; Musona 65', 90+6'; Al-Harabi 72', (yellow card) 80'; Majrashi (yellow card) 90'	Report	Tavares 9'; Ismael (yellow card) 54'; Al-Ahmed (yellow card) 90'; Barnawi (yellow card) 90+3'	Stadium: Prince Abdul Aziz bin Musa'ed Stadium; Attendance: 4,066; Referee: Faisal Al-Blwi

31 December 2021 15	Al-Faisaly	2–3	Al-Hilal	Al Majma'ah
18:05	Silva 6'; Amalfitano 48'; Al-Amri (yellow card) 59'	Report	Al-Breik (yellow card) 35'; Al-Bulaihi (yellow card) 41'; Gomis 55' (pen.), 79'; S. Al-Dawsari 59'; Kanno (yellow card) 70'	Stadium: Al Majma'ah Sports City; Attendance: 3,500; Referee: Majed Al-Shamrani

11 January 2022 16	Al-Faisaly	2–2	Al-Ahli	Al Majma'ah
18:05	Faik 10'; I. Rossi (yellow card) 32'; Barnawi (yellow card) 39'; Guilherme 55'; Ismael (yellow card) 90+8'	Report	Al-Khabrani (yellow card) 2' (yellow-red card) 74'; Al Somah 45+4' (pen.), 81'; Al-Johani (yellow card) 73'; Al-Moasher (yellow card) 90+2'	Stadium: Al Majma'ah Sports City; Attendance: 3,412; Referee: Sami Al-Jires

15 January 2022 17	Al-Nassr	4–0	Al-Faisaly	Riyadh
18:05	K. Al-Ghannam 2'; Talisca 74'; Martínez 78', 80'	Report	Al-Saiari (yellow card) 31'; Silva (yellow card) 53'; Amalfitano (yellow card) 64'; Al-Amri (yellow card) 75'	Stadium: Mrsool Park; Attendance: 6,811; Referee: Sandro Schärer (Switzerland)

21 January 2022 18	Al-Ittihad	1–0	Al-Faisaly	Jeddah
20:10	Romarinho 88'	Report	Ismael (yellow card) 37'; Al-Qumayzi (yellow card) 57'; Al-Amri (yellow card) 90+10'	Stadium: King Abdullah Sports City; Attendance: 26,901; Referee: Rodolpho Toski (Brazil)

5 February 2022 19	Al-Faisaly	3–0	Damac	Al Majma'ah
18:20	I. Rossi 8'; Qassem (yellow card) 10'; Assiri (yellow card) 11'; Rossi P. 21', (yellow card) 65'; Boyle 29', (yellow card) 66'	Report		Stadium: Al Majma'ah Sports City; Attendance: 3,500; Referee: Sami Al-Jires

10 February 2022 20	Al-Fayha	0–0	Al-Faisaly	Al Majma'ah
20:20	Al-Rashidi (yellow card) 74'	Report	Boyle (yellow card) 17'; I. Rossi (yellow card) 47'	Stadium: Al Majma'ah Sports City; Attendance: 3,468; Referee: Mohammed Al-Hoaish

18 February 2022 21	Al-Faisaly	0–0	Al-Raed	Al Majma'ah
18:30		Report	Al-Khathlan (yellow card) 61'	Stadium: Al Majma'ah Sports City; Attendance: 3,475; Referee: Mohammed Al-Esmaiel

22 February 2022 10	Al-Fateh	4–1	Al-Faisaly	Al-Hasa
18:15	Bendebka 24'; Cueva 42' (pen.), 45'; Saâdane 55'	Report	Al-Qumayzi (yellow card) 40'; Al-Dawsari (yellow card) 83'; Tavares 84'	Stadium: Prince Abdullah bin Jalawi Stadium; Attendance: 8,279; Referee: Sultan Al-Harbi

27 February 2022 22	Al-Batin	1–0	Al-Faisaly	Hafar al-Batin
15:50	M. Al-Qarni (yellow card) 22'; El Jebli 45+3'	Report	Qassem (yellow card) 57'; Al-Ahmed (yellow card) 60'; Assiri (yellow card) 90+7' (yellow-red card) 90+7'	Stadium: Al-Batin Club Stadium; Attendance: 2,127; Referee: Faisal Al-Blwi

5 March 2022 23	Al-Faisaly	1–0	Al-Hazem	Al Majma'ah
18:40	Boyle 18'; Faik (yellow card) 42'	Report	Henty (yellow card) 66'	Stadium: Al Majma'ah Sports City; Attendance: 3,494; Referee: Mohammed Al-Hoaish

10 March 2022 24	Al-Taawoun	2–2	Al-Faisaly	Buraidah
18:50	Tawamba 11' (pen.), 72'; Medrán (yellow card) 61'; El Mahdioui (yellow card) 79'; Al-Oyayari (yellow card) 90+8'	Report	Tavares 57'; Al-Saiari 90+9'	Stadium: King Abdullah Sport City Stadium; Attendance: 6,897; Referee: Matthew Conger (New Zealand)

17 March 2022 25	Al-Faisaly	1–0	Al-Fateh	Al Majma'ah
18:45	Ismael (yellow card) 8'; Al-Qumayzi (yellow card) 28'; Faik (yellow card) 40'; Boyle 59'; Al-Dawsari (yellow card) 66'; Qassem (yellow card) 74'	Report	Santini (yellow card) 33'; Buhimed (yellow card) 39'; Boushal (yellow card) 82'	Stadium: Al Majma'ah Sports City; Attendance: 6,315; Referee: Sami Al-Jires

6 May 2022 26	Abha	0–0	Al-Faisaly	Abha
19:10		Report		Stadium: Prince Sultan bin Abdul Aziz Stadium; Attendance: 1,026; Referee: Khaled Al-Teris

12 May 2022 27	Al-Shabab	1–0	Al-Faisaly	Riyadh
20:50	Bahebri 75', (yellow card) 82'	Report	Malayekah (red card) 30'; Ismael (yellow card) 40'; Qassem (yellow card) 88'	Stadium: Prince Faisal bin Fahd Stadium; Attendance: 0 Referee: Majed Al-Shamrani

28 May 2022 28	Al-Faisaly	1–1	Al-Ettifaq	Al Majma'ah
19:20	Al-Amri (yellow card) 22'; Al-Ahmed 35', (yellow card) 56'; Ismael (yellow card) 78'	Report	Al-Mowalad (yellow card) 66'; Al-Kuwaykibi (yellow card) 78'; Sliti 90+3'	Stadium: Al Majma'ah Sports City; Attendance: 6,410; Referee: Anastasios Sidiropoulos (Greece)

23 June 2022 29	Al-Faisaly	1–0	Al-Tai	Al Majma'ah
21:00	Tavares 24'; Boyle (yellow card) 45+3'; Rossi P. (yellow card) 62'; Al-Qumayzi (yellow card) 90+2'	Report	Bajandouh (yellow card) 15'; Fai (yellow card) 67'	Stadium: Al Majma'ah Sports City; Attendance: 6,394; Referee: Kevin Ortega (Peru)

27 June 2022 30	Al-Hilal	2–1	Al-Faisaly	Riyadh
21:00	Ighalo 7', 64'; Michael (yellow card) 86'; Carrillo (yellow card) 90'	Report	Al-Qumayzi (yellow card) 45+2'; Clayson 70'; Al-Amri (yellow card) 83'; Al-Saiari (yellow card) 90+6'; Malayekah (yellow card) 90+6'; Qassem (red card) 90+10'	Stadium: King Fahd International Stadium; Attendance: 33,963; Referee: Anastasios Sidiropoulos (Greece)

=== King Cup ===
All times are local, AST (UTC+3).

21 December 2021 Round of 16	Al-Ahli	2–1	Al-Faisaly	Jeddah
20:00	Hindi (yellow card) 32'; Dankler 63'; Al Somah 88'; Al-Rubaie (yellow card) 90+2'; Hawsawi (yellow card) 90+4'; Al-Majhad (yellow card) 90+9'	Report	Barnawi (yellow card) 16'; Kaabi (yellow card) 30'; Amalfitano 45'; Rossi (yellow card) 90+5'	Stadium: Prince Abdullah Al-Faisal Stadium; Attendance: 7,516; Referee: Raed Al-Zahrani

=== Saudi Super Cup ===
All times are local, AST (UTC+3).

6 January 2022 Final	Al-Hilal	2–2 (4–3 p)	Al-Faisaly	Riyadh
20:15	Al-Mayouf (yellow card) 27'; Jang Hyun-soo (yellow card) 31'; Al-Dawsari 40'; Al-Shahrani 53'; Al-Bulaihi (yellow card) 79'	Report	Al-Amri 16'; Amalfitano 24'; Al-Amri (yellow card) 42'; Tavares (red card) 45+3'; Barnawi (yellow card) 70'	Stadium: Prince Faisal bin Fahd Stadium; Attendance: 6,164; Referee: Danny Makkelie (Netherlands)
	Penalties
	Marega (penalty scored); Al-Hamdan (penalty scored); Al-Dawsari (penalty scored); Pereira (penalty missed); Gomis (penalty missed); Al-Faraj (penalty scored)		Guilherme (penalty scored); Ismael (penalty scored); Al-Saiari (penalty missed); Silva (penalty missed); Rossi (penalty scored); Al-Ahmed (penalty missed)

=== AFC Champions League ===
==== Group stage ====
Pos	Team	Pld	W	D	L	GF	GA	GD	Pts	Qualification	FAI	NAS	SAD	WEH
1	(Saudi Arabia) Al-Faisaly (H)	6	2	3	1	5	4	+1	9 (Note: Head-to-head points: Al-Faisaly 4, Nasaf Qarshi 1.)	Advance to Round of 16	—	0–0	2–1	1–1
2	(Uzbekistan) Nasaf Qarshi	6	2	3	1	8	5	+3	9	Advance to Round of 16	0–1	—	3–1	2–0
3	(Qatar) Al-Sadd	6	2	1	3	10	11	−1	7		1–0	1–1	—	5–2
4	(Jordan) Al-Wehdat	6	1	3	2	9	12	−3	6		1–1	2–2	3–1	—

Source: AFC
Rules for classification: Tiebreakers
(H) Hosts
Notes:

8 April 2022 1	Al-Wehdat (Jordan)	1–1	(Saudi Arabia) Al-Faisaly	Dammam, Saudi Arabia
23:15 UTC+3	Essam (yellow card) 22'; Bitang (yellow card) 35'; Saleh 50'	Report	Faik 12'	Stadium: Prince Mohamed bin Fahd Stadium; Attendance: 1,758; Referee: Ahmed Al-Kaf (Oman)

11 April 2022 2	Al-Faisaly (Saudi Arabia)	2–1	(Qatar) Al-Sadd	Dammam, Saudi Arabia
23:15 UTC+3	Faik 16'; Tavares 53'	Report	Al-Haydos 4'; Salman (yellow card) 45+1'; Khoukhi (yellow card) 59'	Stadium: Prince Mohamed bin Fahd Stadium; Attendance: 700; Referee: Fu Ming (China)

15 April 2022 3	Nasaf Qarshi (Uzbekistan)	0–1	(Saudi Arabia) Al-Faisaly	Dammam, Saudi Arabia
23:15 UTC+3	Stanojević (yellow card) 52'; Aliqulov (yellow card) 53'	Report	Qassem (yellow card) 25'; Tavares 29'; Boyle (yellow card) 77'	Stadium: Prince Mohamed bin Fahd Stadium; Attendance: 200; Referee: Jumpei Iida (Japan)

19 April 2022 4	Al-Faisaly (Saudi Arabia)	0–0	(Uzbekistan) Nasaf Qarshi	Dammam, Saudi Arabia
23:15 UTC+3	Al-Ahmed (yellow card) 19'; Al-Saiari (yellow card) 90+2'	Report		Stadium: Prince Mohamed bin Fahd Stadium; Attendance: 345; Referee: Ahmed Al-Kaf (Oman)

23 April 2022 5	Al-Faisaly (Saudi Arabia)	1–1	(Jordan) Al-Wehdat	Dammam, Saudi Arabia
23:15 UTC+3	Boyle 90+3'	Report	Sariweh 90+1'	Stadium: Prince Mohamed bin Fahd Stadium; Attendance: 1,101; Referee: Kim Jong-hyeok (South Korea)

27 April 2022 6	Al-Sadd (Qatar)	1–0	(Saudi Arabia) Al-Faisaly	Dammam, Saudi Arabia
23:15 UTC+3	Tabata (yellow card) 25'; Al-Hajri (yellow card) 36'; Ró-Ró 45+2'	Report	Al-Qumayzi (yellow card) 10'	Stadium: Prince Mohamed bin Fahd Stadium; Attendance: 200; Referee: Hettikamkanamge Perera (Sri Lanka)

== Statistics ==
=== Appearances ===
Last updated on 27 June 2022.

No.	Pos	Nat	Player	Total		Pro League		King Cup		Champions League		Super Cup	
No.	Pos	Nat	Player	Apps	Goals	Apps	Goals	Apps	Goals	Apps	Goals	Apps	Goals
Goalkeepers
1	GK	(Saudi Arabia) KSA	Mohammed Al-Hassawi	0	0	0	0	0	0	0	0	0	0
26	GK	(Saudi Arabia) KSA	Mustafa Malayekah	23	0	15+1	0	1	0	5	0	1	0
28	GK	(Saudi Arabia) KSA	Ahmed Al-Kassar	17	0	15+1	0	0	0	1	0	0	0
Defenders
3	DF	(Brazil) BRA	Igor Rossi	29	1	25+1	1	1	0	1	0	1	0
5	DF	(Saudi Arabia) KSA	Mohammed Al-Amri	26	1	11+8	0	1	0	4+1	0	1	1
12	DF	(Saudi Arabia) KSA	Hussain Qassem	31	0	21+4	0	0	0	5+1	0	0	0
13	DF	(Saudi Arabia) KSA	Ahmed Assiri	14	0	10+1	0	0	0	3	0	0	0
17	DF	(Saudi Arabia) KSA	Saleh Al-Qumayzi	28	0	20+2	0	0	0	6	0	0	0
22	DF	(Saudi Arabia) KSA	Yassin Barnawi	20	0	8+6	0	1	0	2+2	0	1	0
35	DF	(Saudi Arabia) KSA	Ali Meadi	0	0	0	0	0	0	0	0	0	0
55	DF	(Saudi Arabia) KSA	Mohammed Al-Nukhylan	3	0	0+2	0	0+1	0	0	0	0	0
99	DF	(Saudi Arabia) KSA	Waleed Al-Ahmed	28	1	16+5	1	0	0	6	0	0+1	0
Midfielders
6	MF	(Netherlands) NED	Hicham Faik	33	4	27	2	0	0	5	2	1	0
7	MF	(Brazil) BRA	Ismael	35	1	27	1	1	0	6	0	1	0
8	MF	(Saudi Arabia) KSA	Abdulmajeed Al-Swat	7	0	0+4	0	0	0	0+3	0	0	0
10	MF	(Brazil) BRA	Rossi	15	1	14	1	0	0	1	0	0	0
18	MF	(Saudi Arabia) KSA	Shaye Sharahili	6	0	0+2	0	0	0	1+3	0	0	0
21	MF	(Saudi Arabia) KSA	Abdulaziz Dhafir	4	0	0+3	0	0+1	0	0	0	0	0
25	MF	(Saudi Arabia) KSA	Ismail Omar	8	0	2+6	0	0	0	0	0	0	0
37	MF	(Brazil) BRA	Clayson	8	1	5+3	1	0	0	0	0	0	0
39	MF	(Saudi Arabia) KSA	Abdulrahman Al-Dawsari	34	0	16+10	0	1	0	6	0	0+1	0
77	MF	(Saudi Arabia) KSA	Khalid Kaabi	29	1	9+12	1	1	0	2+4	0	1	0
87	MF	(Saudi Arabia) KSA	Meshal Al-Sebyani	3	0	1+1	0	0	0	0+1	0	0	0
88	MF	(Saudi Arabia) KSA	Abdulaziz Al-Sharid	8	0	1+6	0	0	0	0+1	0	0	0
Forwards
9	FW	(Australia) AUS	Martin Boyle	19	4	13	3	0	0	6	1	0	0
14	FW	(Saudi Arabia) KSA	Saleh Al Abbas	10	0	1+8	0	0	0	0+1	0	0	0
19	FW	(Cape Verde) CPV	Júlio Tavares	34	11	27	9	1	0	5	2	1	0
80	FW	(Saudi Arabia) KSA	Mohammed Al-Saiari	18	1	3+9	1	0+1	0	1+3	0	0+1	0
Players sent out on loan this season
2	DF	(Saudi Arabia) KSA	Abdullah Al-Hassan	1	0	0+1	0	0	0	0	0	0	0
70	MF	(Saudi Arabia) KSA	Ahmed Al-Anzi	4	0	1+2	0	0	0	0	0	0+1	0
Player who made an appearance this season but have left the club
4	DF	(Brazil) BRA	Raphael Silva	15	1	12+1	1	1	0	0	0	1	0
11	MF	(Brazil) BRA	Guilherme	15	2	13	2	1	0	0	0	1	0
23	MF	(France) FRA	Romain Amalfitano	19	6	17	4	1	1	0	0	1	1

=== Goalscorers ===
Rank	No.	Pos	Nat	Name	Pro League	King Cup	Champions League	Super Cup	Total
1	19	FW	(Cape Verde)	Júlio Tavares	9	0	2	0	11
2	23	MF	(France)	Romain Amalfitano	4	1	0	1	6
3	6	MF	(Netherlands)	Hicham Faik	2	0	2	0	4
3	9	FW	(Australia)	Martin Boyle	3	0	1	0	4
5	11	MF	(Brazil)	Guilherme	2	0	0	0	2
6	3	DF	(Brazil)	Igor Rossi	1	0	0	0	1
6	4	DF	(Brazil)	Raphael Silva	1	0	0	0	1
6	5	DF	(Saudi Arabia)	Mohammed Al-Amri	0	0	0	1	1
6	7	MF	(Brazil)	Ismael	1	0	0	0	1
6	10	MF	(Brazil)	Rossi	1	0	0	0	1
6	37	MF	(Brazil)	Clayson	1	0	0	0	1
6	77	MF	(Saudi Arabia)	Khalid Kaabi	1	0	0	0	1
6	80	FW	(Saudi Arabia)	Mohammed Al-Saiari	1	0	0	0	1
6	99	DF	(Saudi Arabia)	Waleed Al-Ahmed	1	0	0	0	1
Own goal					0	0	0	0	0
Total					28	1	5	2	36

Last Updated: 27 June 2022

=== Assists ===
Rank	No.	Pos	Nat	Name	Pro League	King Cup	Champions League	Super Cup	Total
1	19	FW	(Cape Verde)	Júlio Tavares	2	0	1	1	4
2	5	DF	(Saudi Arabia)	Mohammed Al-Amri	2	0	1	0	3
2	6	MF	(Netherlands)	Hicham Faik	2	0	1	0	3
2	7	MF	(Brazil)	Ismael	3	0	0	0	3
5	9	FW	(Australia)	Martin Boyle	1	0	1	0	2
5	11	MF	(Brazil)	Guilherme	2	0	0	0	2
5	17	DF	(Saudi Arabia)	Saleh Al-Qumayzi	2	0	0	0	2
5	23	MF	(France)	Romain Amalfitano	2	0	0	0	2
5	77	MF	(Saudi Arabia)	Khalid Kaabi	2	0	0	0	2
10	37	MF	(Brazil)	Clayson	1	0	0	0	1
10	39	MF	(Saudi Arabia)	Abdulrahman Al-Dawsari	0	1	0	0	1
10	80	FW	(Saudi Arabia)	Mohammed Al-Saiari	1	0	0	0	1
Total					20	1	4	1	26

Last Updated: 27 June 2022

=== Clean sheets ===
Rank	No.	Pos	Nat	Name	Pro League	King Cup	Champions League	Super Cup	Total
1	26	GK	(Saudi Arabia)	Mustafa Malayekah	7	0	2	0	9
2	28	GK	(Saudi Arabia)	Ahmed Al-Kassar	3	0	0	0	3
Total					10	0	2	0	12

Last Updated: 23 June 2022
