= Abdulaziz Dhafir =

Saudi Arabian footballer

Abdulaziz Dhafir عبدالعزيز ظافر
Personal information
- Full name: Abdulaziz Dhafir Omar Atif
- Date of birth: 3 January 2001 (age 25)
- Place of birth: Saudi Arabia
- Position: Midfielder

Team information
- Current team: Al-Sharq

Youth career
- Al-Faisaly

Senior career*
| Years | Team | Apps | (Gls) |
| 2021–2023 | Al-Faisaly | 8 | (0) |
| 2023–2024 | Al-Diriyah | | |
| 2024– | Al-Sharq | | |

International career
| 2022– | Saudi Arabia U23 | | |
- * Club domestic league appearances and goals as of 27 August 2021

Abdulaziz Dhafir (Arabic: عبدالعزيز ظافر, born 3 January 2001) is a Saudi Arabian professional footballer who plays as a midfielder for Al-Sharq.

== Career ==
Dhafir started at Al-Faisaly's youth team and was promoted to the first team during the 2021–22 season. On 27 August 2021, Dhafir made his professional debut for Al-Faisaly against Al-Ittihad in the Pro League, replacing Guilherme. In September 2023, Dhafir joined Saudi Second Division side Al-Diriyah. On 30 July 2024, Dhafir joined Al-Sharq.

== Career statistics ==
=== Club ===
As of match played 27 August 2021

| Club | Season | League | | King Cup | | Asia | | Other | | Total | |
| Club | Season | Apps | Goals | Apps | Goals | Apps | Goals | Apps | Goals | Apps | Goals |
|---|---|---|---|---|---|---|---|---|---|---|---|
| Al-Faisaly | 2021–22 | 1 | 0 | 0 | 0 | 0 | 0 | 0 | 0 | 1 | 0 |
| Al-Faisaly | Total | 1 | 0 | 0 | 0 | 0 | 0 | 0 | 0 | 1 | 0 |
| Career totals | | 1 | 0 | 0 | 0 | 0 | 0 | 0 | 0 | 1 | 0 |
