= 2022 AFC Champions League qualifying play-offs =

Football tournament qualification stage

The 2022 AFC Champions League qualifying play-offs were played from 8 to 15 March 2022. A total of 16 teams competed in the qualifying play-offs to decide seven of the 40 places in the group stage of the 2022 AFC Champions League.

== Teams ==
The following 14 teams, split into two regions (West Region and East Region), entered the qualifying play-offs, consisting of two rounds:

- 2 teams entered in the preliminary round.
- 12 teams entered in the play-off round.

Region	Teams entering in play-off round	Teams entering in preliminary round
West Region	(Saudi Arabia) Al-Taawoun; (United Arab Emirates) Baniyas; (United Arab Emirates) Sharjah; (Iraq) Al-Zawraa; (Uzbekistan) Nasaf Qarshi; (Syria) Al-Jaish	
East Region	(China) ~~Changchun Yatai~~ (Note: Changchun Yatai withdrew from the competition after the draw. AFC decided to cancel the play-off match, and the winner of preliminary stage, Sydney FC, automatically advanced to the group stage.); (Japan) Vissel Kobe; (South Korea) Ulsan Hyundai; (South Korea) Daegu FC; (Thailand) Buriram United; (Thailand) Port; (Australia) Melbourne Victory	~~(Australia) Melbourne Victory~~ (Note: Shan United withdrew from the AFC Champions League and Melbourne Victory entered the play-off round instead of the preliminary round.); (Australia) Sydney FC; (Philippines) Kaya FC–Iloilo; ~~(Myanmar) Shan United~~

== Format ==
In the qualifying play-offs, each tie was played as a single match. Extra time and penalty shoot-out were used to decide the winner if necessary.

== Schedule ==
The schedule of each round was as follows.

Round	Match date
Preliminary round	8 March 2022
Play-off round	15 March 2022

== Bracket ==
The bracket of the qualifying play-offs for each region was determined based on each team's association ranking and their seeding within their association, with the team from the higher-ranked association hosting the match. Teams from the same association could not be placed into the same tie. The seven winners of the play-off round (three from West Region and four from East Region) advanced to the group stage to join the 33 direct entrants.

=== Play-off West 1 ===
- (Saudi Arabia) Al-Taawoun advanced to Group D.

Preliminary round

Play-off round
(Saudi Arabia) Al-Taawoun (p)	1 (5)
(Syria) Al-Jaish	1 (4)

=== Play-off West 2 ===
- (Uzbekistan) Nasaf Qarshi advanced to Group E.

Preliminary round

Play-off round
(United Arab Emirates) Baniyas	0
(Uzbekistan) Nasaf Qarshi	2

=== Play-off West 3 ===
- (United Arab Emirates) Sharjah advanced to Group A.

Preliminary round

Play-off round
(United Arab Emirates) Sharjah (p)	1 (6)
(Iraq) Al-Zawraa	1 (5)

=== Play-off East 1 ===
- (Australia) Sydney FC advanced to Group H.

Preliminary round
(Australia) Sydney FC	5
(Philippines) Kaya–Iloilo	0

Play-off round
(China) Changchun Yatai
(Australia) Sydney FC	w/o

=== Play-off East 2 ===
- (Japan) Vissel Kobe advanced to Group J.

Preliminary round
(Australia) Melbourne Victory	w/o
(Myanmar) Shan United

Play-off round
(Japan) Vissel Kobe (a.e.t.)	4
(Australia) Melbourne Victory	3

=== Play-off East 3 ===
- (South Korea) Ulsan Hyundai advanced to Group I.

Preliminary round

Play-off round
(South Korea) Ulsan Hyundai	3
(Thailand) Port	0

=== Play-off East 4 ===
- (South Korea) Daegu FC advanced to Group F.

Preliminary round

Play-off round
(South Korea) Daegu FC (p)	1 (3)
(Thailand) Buriram United	1 (2)

== Preliminary round ==
=== Summary ===
A total of two teams played in the preliminary round.

East Region
Team 1	Score	Team 2
Sydney FC (Australia)	5–0	(Philippines) Kaya–Iloilo
Melbourne Victory (Australia)	Cancelled	(Myanmar) Shan United

=== East Region ===
8 March 2022
19:30 UTC+11

Sydney FC (Australia)	5–0	(Philippines) Kaya–Iloilo
Buhagiar 30'; Bobô 47', 49' (pen.); Le Fondre 71', 81'	Live Report

Jubilee Oval, Sydney
Attendance: 435
Referee: Rowan Arumughan (India)

Melbourne Victory (Australia)	Cancelled	(Myanmar) Shan United

== Play-off round ==
=== Summary ===
A total of 14 teams played in the play-off round: 12 teams which entered in this round, and two winners of the preliminary round.

West Region
Team 1	Score	Team 2
Al-Taawoun (Saudi Arabia)	1–1 (a.e.t.) (5–4 p)	(Syria) Al-Jaish
Baniyas (United Arab Emirates)	0–2	(Uzbekistan) Nasaf Qarshi
Sharjah (United Arab Emirates)	1–1 (a.e.t.) (6–5 p)	(Iraq) Al-Zawraa

East Region
Team 1	Score	Team 2
Changchun Yatai (China)	Cancelled	(Australia) Sydney FC
Vissel Kobe (Japan)	4–3 (a.e.t.)	(Australia) Melbourne Victory
Ulsan Hyundai (South Korea)	3–0	(Thailand) Port
Daegu FC (South Korea)	1–1 (a.e.t.) (3–2 p)	(Thailand) Buriram United

=== West Region ===
15 March 2022
18:50 UTC+3

Al-Taawoun (Saudi Arabia)	1–1 (a.e.t.)	(Syria) Al-Jaish
Al-Nabit 81'	Live Report	Al Wakid 70'
Penalties
Al-Sobhi (penalty scored); Tawamba (penalty scored); Hawsawi (penalty scored); Cássio (penalty scored); Medrán (penalty scored)	5–4	(penalty missed) Al Saleh; (penalty scored) Hamad; (penalty scored) Al Turk; (penalty scored) Meshleb; (penalty scored) Amer

King Abdullah Sport City Stadium, Buraidah
Attendance: 12,911
Referee: Sivakorn Pu-udom (Thailand)
15 March 2022
20:15 UTC+4

Baniyas (United Arab Emirates)	0–2	(Uzbekistan) Nasaf Qarshi
	Live Report	Nasrullayev 27'; Norchaev 75'

Baniyas Club Stadium, Abu Dhabi
Attendance: 1,304
Referee: Ali Sabah (Iraq)
15 March 2022
20:15 UTC+4

Sharjah (United Arab Emirates)	1–1 (a.e.t.)	(Iraq) Al-Zawraa
Ba Wazir 89' (pen.)	Live Report	Abdul-Amir 62'
Penalties
Ba Wazir (penalty scored); Shukurov (penalty scored); Saleh (penalty scored); Caio (penalty scored); Abdulbasit (penalty scored); Abdulrahman (penalty scored)	6–5	(penalty scored) Sartip; (penalty scored) Abdul-Amir; (penalty scored) Touil; (penalty scored) Ridha Jalil; (penalty scored) Kamil; (penalty missed) Hassan

Sharjah Stadium, Sharjah
Attendance: 2,200
Referee: Kim Dae-yong (South Korea)

=== East Region ===
Changchun Yatai (China)	Cancelled	(Australia) Sydney FC

15 March 2022
19:00 UTC+9

Vissel Kobe (Japan)	4–3 (a.e.t.)	(Australia) Melbourne Victory
Iniesta 6'; Osako 80', 87'; Lincoln 95'	Live Report	D'Agostino 12', 71'; Folami 90'

Noevir Stadium Kobe, Kobe
Attendance: 7,861
Referee: Hanna Hattab (Syria)
15 March 2022
19:00 UTC+9

Ulsan Hyundai (South Korea)	3–0	(Thailand) Port
Choi Gi-yun 19'; Um Won-sang 83'; Leonardo 87' (pen.)	Live Report

Ulsan Munsu Football Stadium, Ulsan
Attendance: 1,569
Referee: Adham Makhadmeh (Jordan)
15 March 2022
19:30 UTC+9

Daegu FC (South Korea)	1–1 (a.e.t.)	(Thailand) Buriram United
Cesinha 120+1'	Live Report	Bolingi 119'
Penalties
Lamas (penalty missed); Kim Jin-hyuk (penalty scored); Lee Keun-ho (penalty scored); Suzuki (penalty scored)	3–2	(penalty scored) Ratthanakorn; (penalty missed) Suphanat; (penalty missed) Theerathon; (penalty scored) Sasalak; (penalty missed) Bolingi

DGB Daegu Bank Park, Daegu
Attendance: 3,271
Referee: Bijan Heydari (Iran)
