= 2022 AFC Champions League group stage =

The 2022 AFC Champions League group stage was played from 15 April to 1 May 2022 for the East Region and from 7 to 27 April 2022 for the West Region. A total of 40 teams competed in the group stage to decide the 16 places in the knockout stage of the 2022 AFC Champions League.

== Draw ==
The draw for the group stage was held on 17 January 2022 at the AFC House in Kuala Lumpur, Malaysia. The 40 teams were drawn into ten groups of four: five groups each in the West Region (Groups A–E) and the East Region (Groups F–J). For each region, teams were seeded into four pots and drawn into the relevant positions within each group, based on their association ranking and their seeding within their association, in consideration of the technical balance between groups. Teams from the same association could not be drawn into the same group.

The following 40 teams entered into the group stage draw, which included the 33 direct entrants and the seven winners of the play-off round of the qualifying play-offs, whose identity was not known at the time of the draw.

Region	Groups	Pot 1	Pot 2	Pot 3	Pot 4
West Region	A–E	(Qatar) Al-Sadd	(Saudi Arabia) Al-Faisaly	(Uzbekistan) Pakhtakor	(Iraq) Al-Quwa Al-Jawiya (Note: The first-seeded teams of the associations ranked 5th were seeded in the same pot as the play-off winners in consideration of technical balance.)
West Region	A–E	(Saudi Arabia) Al-Hilal	(Iran) Sepahan	(Jordan) Al-Wehdat	(Saudi Arabia) Al-Taawoun (Winners of Play-off West 1)
West Region	A–E	(Iran) Foolad	(United Arab Emirates) Shabab Al-Ahli	(India) Mumbai City	(Uzbekistan) Nasaf Qarshi (Winners of Play-off West 2)
West Region	A–E	(United Arab Emirates) Al-Jazira	(Qatar) Al-Rayyan	(Tajikistan) Istiklol	(United Arab Emirates) Sharjah (Winners of Play-off West 3)
West Region	A–E	(Qatar) Al-Duhail	(Saudi Arabia) Al-Shabab	(Turkmenistan) Ahal	(Qatar) Al-Gharafa (Note: Al-Gharafa was seeded in Pot 4 after being given a bye into the group stage.)
East Region	F–J	(China) Shandong Taishan	(Japan) Urawa Red Diamonds	(Philippines) United City	(Australia) Melbourne City
East Region	F–J	(Japan) Kawasaki Frontale	(South Korea) Jeonnam Dragons	(Hong Kong) Kitchee (Note: The teams which entered the group stage due to slot reallocation were seeded according to the teams they replace.)	(Australia) Sydney FC (Winners of Play-off East 1)
East Region	F–J	(South Korea) Jeonbuk Hyundai Motors	(Thailand) Chiangrai United	(Vietnam) Hoàng Anh Gia Lai	(Japan) Vissel Kobe (Winners of Play-off East 2)
East Region	F–J	(Thailand) BG Pathum United	(China) Guangzhou	(Malaysia) Johor Darul Ta'zim	(South Korea) Ulsan Hyundai (Winners of Play-off East 3)
East Region	F–J	~~(China) Shanghai Port~~ (Note: Shanghai Port withdrew from the competition due to travel restrictions as a result of the recent lockdown measures enforced in Shanghai due to the COVID-19 pandemic.)	(Japan) Yokohama F. Marinos	(Singapore) Lion City Sailors	(South Korea) Daegu FC (Winners of Play-off East 4)

== Format ==
In the group stage, each group was played in a double round-robin format in centralised venues. The winners of each group and three best runners-up from each region advanced to the round of 16 of the knockout stage.

=== Tiebreakers ===
The teams were ranked according to points (3 points for a win, 1 point for a draw, 0 points for a loss). If tied on points, tiebreakers were applied in the following order (Regulations Article 8.3):

1. Points in head-to-head matches among tied teams;
2. Goal difference in head-to-head matches among tied teams;
3. Goals scored in head-to-head matches among tied teams;
4. ~~Away goals scored in head-to-head matches among tied teams;~~ (not applicable since the matches were played in a centralised venue)
5. If more than two teams were tied, and after applying all head-to-head criteria above, a subset of teams were still tied, all head-to-head criteria above were reapplied exclusively to this subset of teams;
6. Goal difference in all group matches;
7. Goals scored in all group matches;
8. Penalty shoot-out if only two teams playing each other in the last round of the group are tied;
9. Disciplinary points (yellow card = 1 point, red card as a result of two yellow cards = 3 points, direct red card = 3 points, yellow card followed by direct red card = 4 points);
10. Association ranking.

== Schedule ==
The schedule for each match day was as follows.

Match day	West Region	East Region
1	7–8 April	15–16 April
2	10–11 April	18–19 April
3	14–15 April	21–22 April
4	18–19 April	24–25 April
5	22–23 April	27–28 April
6	26–27 April	30 April – 1 May

=== Centralised venues ===
On 16 February 2022, AFC confirmed hosts for the East group stage. On 3 March 2022, AFC confirmed hosts for the West group stage.

- Groups A and B: Riyadh, Saudi Arabia
- Group C: Jeddah, Saudi Arabia
- Group D: Buraidah, Saudi Arabia
- Group E: Dammam, Saudi Arabia
- Groups F and J: Buriram, Thailand
- Group G: Bangkok, Thailand
- Group H: Ho Chi Minh City, Vietnam
- Group I: Johor Bahru, Malaysia

== Groups ==
=== Group A ===
Pos	Team	Pld	W	D	L	GF	GA	GD	Pts	Qualification	HIL	RYN	SHJ	IST
1	(Saudi Arabia) Al-Hilal (H)	6	4	1	1	11	5	+6	13 (Note: Equal on head-to-head points. Head-to-head goal difference: Al-Hilal +1, Al-Rayyan –1.)	Advance to Round of 16	—	0–2	2–1	1–0
2	(Qatar) Al-Rayyan	6	4	1	1	10	7	+3	13	Advance to Round of 16	0–3	—	3–1	1–0
3	(United Arab Emirates) Sharjah	6	1	2	3	7	11	−4	5		2–2	1–1	—	2–1
4	(Tajikistan) Istiklol	6	1	0	5	5	10	−5	3		0–3	2–3	2–0	—

Source: AFC
Rules for classification: Tiebreakers
(H) Hosts
Notes:
8 April 2022
20:15 UTC+3

Istiklol (Tajikistan)	2–3	(Qatar) Al-Rayyan
Sulaimonov 3'; Isaev 67'	Report	Brahimi 8'; Boli 44', 71'

King Fahd International Stadium, Riyadh
Attendance: 0
Referee: Yusuke Araki (Japan)
8 April 2022
23:15 UTC+3

Al-Hilal (Saudi Arabia)	2–1	(United Arab Emirates) Sharjah
Al-Shehri 5' (pen.); Michael 62'	Report	Shukurov 7'

Prince Faisal bin Fahd Stadium, Riyadh
Attendance: 13,579
Referee: Ma Ning (China)

11 April 2022
20:15 UTC+3

Al-Rayyan (Qatar)	0–3	(Saudi Arabia) Al-Hilal
	Report	Al-Hamdan 27'; Kanno 49'; N. Al-Dawsari 87'

Prince Faisal bin Fahd Stadium, Riyadh
Attendance: 9,810
Referee: Adham Makhadmeh (Jordan)
11 April 2022
23:15 UTC+3

Sharjah (United Arab Emirates)	2–1	(Tajikistan) Istiklol
Lucas 54'; Bernard 57'	Report	M. Dzhalilov 29'

King Fahd International Stadium, Riyadh
Attendance: 54
Referee: Aziz Asimov (Uzbekistan)

15 April 2022
20:15 UTC+3

Sharjah (United Arab Emirates)	1–1	(Qatar) Al-Rayyan
Bernard 45'	Report	Nzonzi 65'

King Fahd International Stadium, Riyadh
Attendance: 67
Referee: Hettikamkanamge Perera (Sri Lanka)
15 April 2022
23:15 UTC+3

Al-Hilal (Saudi Arabia)	1–0	(Tajikistan) Istiklol
Al-Faraj 52'	Report

Prince Faisal bin Fahd Stadium, Riyadh
Attendance: 13,158
Referee: Ahmed Al-Kaf (Oman)

19 April 2022
20:15 UTC+3

Al-Rayyan (Qatar)	3–1	(United Arab Emirates) Sharjah
Sultan 12' (o.g.); Nzonzi 39'; Brahimi 62' (pen.)	Report	Caio 18'

King Fahd International Stadium, Riyadh
Attendance: 37
Referee: Aziz Asimov (Uzbekistan)
19 April 2022
23:15 UTC+3

Istiklol (Tajikistan)	0–3	(Saudi Arabia) Al-Hilal
	Report	Ighalo 8', 33'; S. Al-Dawsari 90+2'

Prince Faisal bin Fahd Stadium, Riyadh
Attendance: 10,241
Referee: Hanna Hattab (Syria)

23 April 2022
20:15 UTC+3

Al-Rayyan (Qatar)	1–0	(Tajikistan) Istiklol
Boli 90'	Report

King Fahd International Stadium, Riyadh
Attendance: 48
Referee: Kim Hee-gon (South Korea)
23 April 2022
23:15 UTC+3

Sharjah (United Arab Emirates)	2–2	(Saudi Arabia) Al-Hilal
Camara 5'; Rashid 45+1'	Report	Al-Mufarrij 78'; S. Al-Dawsari 90+6' (pen.)

Prince Faisal bin Fahd Stadium, Riyadh
Attendance: 9,241
Referee: Mohanad Qasim Sarray (Iraq)

27 April 2022
23:15 UTC+3

Al-Hilal (Saudi Arabia)	0–2	(Qatar) Al-Rayyan
	Report	Al-Abdullah 5'; Boli 43'

Prince Faisal bin Fahd Stadium, Riyadh
Attendance: 6,973
Referee: Jumpei Iida (Japan)
27 April 2022
23:15 UTC+3

Istiklol (Tajikistan)	2–0	(United Arab Emirates) Sharjah
Bocoum 14'; Kasmynin 90+1'	Report

King Fahd International Stadium, Riyadh
Attendance: 15
Referee: Mohd Amirul Izwan Yaacob (Malaysia)

=== Group B ===
Pos	Team	Pld	W	D	L	GF	GA	GD	Pts	Qualification	SHB	MUM	QWJ	AJZ
1	(Saudi Arabia) Al-Shabab (H)	6	5	1	0	18	1	+17	16	Advance to Round of 16	—	6–0	3–0	3–0
2	(India) Mumbai City	6	2	1	3	3	11	−8	7 (Note: Head-to-head points: Mumbai City 6, Al-Quwa Al-Jawiya 0.)		0–3	—	1–0	0–0
3	(Iraq) Al-Quwa Al-Jawiya	6	2	1	3	7	10	−3	7		1–1	1–2	—	3–2
4	(United Arab Emirates) Al-Jazira	6	1	1	4	4	10	−6	4		0–2	1–0	1–2	—

Source: AFC
Rules for classification: Tiebreakers
(H) Hosts
Notes:
8 April 2022
20:15 UTC+3

Mumbai City (India)	0–3	(Saudi Arabia) Al-Shabab
	Report	Banega 36' (pen.), 68'; Al-Ammar 77'

Prince Faisal bin Fahd Stadium, Riyadh
Attendance: 3,000
Referee: Mohd Amirul Izwan Yaacob (Malaysia)
8 April 2022
23:15 UTC+3

Al-Jazira (United Arab Emirates)	1–2	(Iraq) Al-Quwa Al-Jawiya
Al-Ameri 43'	Report	Jabbar 11'; Kadhim 82'

King Fahd International Stadium, Riyadh
Attendance: 0
Referee: Ilgiz Tantashev (Uzbekistan)

11 April 2022
20:15 UTC+3

Al-Quwa Al-Jawiya (Iraq)	1–2	(India) Mumbai City
Ahmed 59'	Report	Maurício 70' (pen.); Bheke 75'

King Fahd International Stadium, Riyadh
Attendance: 41
Referee: Hanna Hattab (Syria)
11 April 2022
23:15 UTC+3

Al-Shabab (Saudi Arabia)	3–0	(United Arab Emirates) Al-Jazira
Carlos 6', 78'; Al-Ammar 18'	Report

Prince Faisal bin Fahd Stadium, Riyadh
Attendance: 1,329
Referee: Hettikamkanamge Perera (Sri Lanka)

14 April 2022
20:15 UTC+3

Al-Jazira (United Arab Emirates)	1–0	(India) Mumbai City
Mabkhout 40' (pen.)	Report

King Fahd International Stadium, Riyadh
Attendance: 69
Referee: Kim Jong-hyeok (South Korea)
14 April 2022
23:15 UTC+3

Al-Quwa Al-Jawiya (Iraq)	1–1	(Saudi Arabia) Al-Shabab
Miller 68'	Report	Al-Qahtani 90+6'

Prince Faisal bin Fahd Stadium, Riyadh
Attendance: 1,295
Referee: Sivakorn Pu-udom (Thailand)

18 April 2022
20:15 UTC+3

Mumbai City (India)	0–0	(United Arab Emirates) Al-Jazira
	Report

King Fahd International Stadium, Riyadh
Attendance: 23
Referee: Hiroyuki Kimura (Japan)
18 April 2022
23:15 UTC+3

Al-Shabab (Saudi Arabia)	3–0	(Iraq) Al-Quwa Al-Jawiya
Al-Abed 30'; Carlos 39', 73'	Report

Prince Faisal bin Fahd Stadium, Riyadh
Attendance: 1,397
Referee: Ilgiz Tantashev (Uzbekistan)

22 April 2022
20:15 UTC+3

Al-Quwa Al-Jawiya (Iraq)	3–2	(United Arab Emirates) Al-Jazira
Bayesh 6'; Abbas 60'; Abdul-Kadhim 90+1'	Report	Ramadan 62'; Traore 77'

King Fahd International Stadium, Riyadh
Attendance: 50
Referee: Ahmed Al-Kaf (Oman)
22 April 2022
23:15 UTC+3

Al-Shabab (Saudi Arabia)	6–0	(India) Mumbai City
Bahebri 19', 64', 66'; Fall 36' (o.g.); Al-Jouei 52'; Carlos 81'	Report

Prince Faisal bin Fahd Stadium, Riyadh
Attendance: 1,135
Referee: Fu Ming (China)

26 April 2022
23:15 UTC+3

Al-Jazira (United Arab Emirates)	0–2	(Saudi Arabia) Al-Shabab
	Report	Mary 68'; Paulinho 88'

Prince Faisal bin Fahd Stadium, Riyadh
Attendance: 437
Referee: Ilgiz Tantashev (Uzbekistan)
26 April 2022
23:15 UTC+3

Mumbai City (India)	1–0	(Iraq) Al-Quwa Al-Jawiya
Maurício 31'	Report

King Fahd International Stadium, Riyadh
Attendance: 5
Referee: Adham Makhadmeh (Jordan)

=== Group C ===
Pos	Team	Pld	W	D	L	GF	GA	GD	Pts	Qualification	FOO	SAH	GHA	AHA
1	(Iran) Foolad	6	3	3	0	5	2	+3	12	Advance to Round of 16	—	1–1	0–0	1–0
2	(United Arab Emirates) Shabab Al-Ahli	6	2	4	0	14	7	+7	10	Advance to Round of 16	1–1	—	8–2	2–1
3	(Qatar) Al-Gharafa	6	1	2	3	7	14	−7	5		0–1	1–1	—	2–0
4	(Turkmenistan) Ahal	6	1	1	4	6	9	−3	4		0–1	1–1	4–2	—

Source: AFC
Rules for classification: Tiebreakers
7 April 2022
20:15 UTC+3

Foolad (Iran)	0–0	(Qatar) Al-Gharafa
	Report

Prince Abdullah Al Faisal Stadium, Jeddah
Attendance: 100
Referee: Ko Hyung-jin (South Korea)
7 April 2022
23:15 UTC+3

Ahal (Turkmenistan)	1–1	(United Arab Emirates) Shabab Al-Ahli
Bäşimow 75'	Report	Ganiev 79' (pen.)

King Abdullah Sports City, Jeddah
Attendance: 76
Referee: Rowan Arumughan (India)

10 April 2022
20:15 UTC+3

Shabab Al-Ahli (United Arab Emirates)	1–1	(Iran) Foolad
Cartabia 90+1'	Report	Nourollahi 83' (o.g.)

King Abdullah Sports City, Jeddah
Attendance: 79
Referee: Ryuji Sato (Japan)
10 April 2022
23:15 UTC+3

Al-Gharafa (Qatar)	2–0	(Turkmenistan) Ahal
Diabaté 60'; Alaaeldin 87'	Report

Prince Abdullah Al Faisal Stadium, Jeddah
Attendance: 74
Referee: Shaun Evans (Australia)

14 April 2022
20:15 UTC+3

Foolad (Iran)	1–0	(Turkmenistan) Ahal
Coulibaly 90+7'	Report

King Abdullah Sports City, Jeddah
Attendance: 25
Referee: Ali Sabah (Iraq)
14 April 2022
23:15 UTC+3

Al-Gharafa (Qatar)	1–1	(United Arab Emirates) Shabab Al-Ahli
Hanni 44'	Report	Cartabia 90+1'

Prince Abdullah Al Faisal Stadium, Jeddah
Attendance: 143
Referee: Nazmi Nasaruddin (Malaysia)

18 April 2022
20:15 UTC+3

Ahal (Turkmenistan)	0–1	(Iran) Foolad
	Report	Patosi 39'

King Abdullah Sports City, Jeddah
Attendance: 75
Referee: Nazmi Nasaruddin (Malaysia)
18 April 2022
23:15 UTC+3

Shabab Al-Ahli (United Arab Emirates)	8–2	(Qatar) Al-Gharafa
Olsen 14', 40'; Al-Maazmi 42'; Ganiev 50', 83'; Cartabia 51'; Jumaa 66'; Sanqour 78'	Report	Alaaeldin 16'; Hanni 59' (pen.)

Prince Abdullah Al Faisal Stadium, Jeddah
Attendance: 185
Referee: Ko Hyung-jin (South Korea)

22 April 2022
20:15 UTC+3

Shabab Al-Ahli (United Arab Emirates)	2–1	(Turkmenistan) Ahal
Cartabia 13', 45'	Report	Amanow 74' (pen.)

King Abdullah Sports City, Jeddah
Attendance: 41
Referee: Shaun Evans (Australia)
22 April 2022
23:15 UTC+3

Al-Gharafa (Qatar)	0–1	(Iran) Foolad
	Report	Chimba 15'

Prince Abdullah Al Faisal Stadium, Jeddah
Attendance: 55
Referee: Ryuji Sato (Japan)

26 April 2022
23:15 UTC+3

Foolad (Iran)	1–1	(United Arab Emirates) Shabab Al-Ahli
Chimba 71' (pen.)	Report	Al Ghassani 82'

Prince Abdullah Al Faisal Stadium, Jeddah
Attendance: 46
Referee: Ko Hyung-jin (South Korea)
26 April 2022
23:15 UTC+3

Ahal (Turkmenistan)	4–2	(Qatar) Al-Gharafa
Amanow 9' (pen.), 70' (pen.), 80'; Beknazarov 38'	Report	Hassan 35'; Hanni 90+4' (pen.)

King Abdullah Sports City, Jeddah
Attendance: 23
Referee: Ali Reda (Lebanon)

=== Group D ===
Pos	Team	Pld	W	D	L	GF	GA	GD	Pts	Qualification	DUH	TWN	SEP	PAK
1	(Qatar) Al-Duhail	6	5	0	1	17	9	+8	15	Advance to Round of 16	—	1–2	5–2	3–2
2	(Saudi Arabia) Al-Taawoun (H)	6	2	1	3	13	12	+1	7 (Note: Head-to-head points: Al-Taawoun 4, Sepahan 1.)		3–4	—	3–0	0–1
3	(Iran) Sepahan	6	2	1	3	8	12	−4	7		0–1	1–1	—	2–1
4	(Uzbekistan) Pakhtakor	6	2	0	4	10	15	−5	6		0–3	5–4	1–3	—

Source: AFC
Rules for classification: Tiebreakers
(H) Hosts
Notes:
7 April 2022
20:15 UTC+3

Pakhtakor (Uzbekistan)	1–3	(Iran) Sepahan
Ćeran 28'	Report	Moghanlou 49', 55'; Hosseini 70'

King Abdullah Sport City Stadium, Buraidah
Attendance: 15
Referee: Adham Makhadmeh (Jordan)
7 April 2022
23:15 UTC+3

Al-Duhail (Qatar)	1–2	(Saudi Arabia) Al-Taawoun
Edmilson 7'	Report	Tawamba 11'; Medrán 86'

King Abdullah Sport City Stadium, Buraidah
Attendance: 4,924
Referee: Mohanad Qasim Sarray (Iraq)

10 April 2022
20:15 UTC+3

Sepahan (Iran)	0–1	(Qatar) Al-Duhail
	Report	Olunga 84'

King Abdullah Sport City Stadium, Buraidah
Attendance: 67
Referee: Sivakorn Pu-udom (Thailand)
10 April 2022
23:15 UTC+3

Al-Taawoun (Saudi Arabia)	0–1	(Uzbekistan) Pakhtakor
	Report	Erkinov 83'

King Abdullah Sport City Stadium, Buraidah
Attendance: 4,105
Referee: Hiroyuki Kimura (Japan)

14 April 2022
20:15 UTC+3

Al-Duhail (Qatar)	3–2	(Uzbekistan) Pakhtakor
Edmilson 66', 71', 84'	Report	Sarkic 44'; Sabirkhodjaev 69'

King Abdullah Sport City Stadium, Buraidah
Attendance: 136
Referee: Kim Dae-yong (South Korea)
14 April 2022
23:15 UTC+3

Al-Taawoun (Saudi Arabia)	3–0	(Iran) Sepahan
Al-Sobhi 43'; Zé Luís 46'; Al-Bakr 77'	Report

King Abdullah Sport City Stadium, Buraidah
Attendance: 3,260
Referee: Ma Ning (China)

18 April 2022
20:15 UTC+3

Pakhtakor (Uzbekistan)	0–3	(Qatar) Al-Duhail
	Report	Al-Rawi 32'; Olunga 45+2'; Ali 47'

King Abdullah Sport City Stadium, Buraidah
Attendance: 82
Referee: Mohd Amirul Izwan Yaacob (Malaysia)
18 April 2022
23:15 UTC+3

Sepahan (Iran)	1–1	(Saudi Arabia) Al-Taawoun
Moghanlou 65'	Report	Al-Nabit 47'

King Abdullah Sport City Stadium, Buraidah
Attendance: 3,789
Referee: Adham Makhadmeh (Jordan)

22 April 2022
20:15 UTC+3

Sepahan (Iran)	2–1	(Uzbekistan) Pakhtakor
Shahbazzadeh 76', 90+3'	Report	Alijonov 79'

King Abdullah Sport City Stadium, Buraidah
Attendance: 20
Referee: Jumpei Iida (Japan)
22 April 2022
23:15 UTC+3

Al-Taawoun (Saudi Arabia)	3–4	(Qatar) Al-Duhail
Tawamba 21', 37'; Al-Amri 25'	Report	Boudiaf 11'; Edmilson 58', 84' (pen.); Ali 88'

King Abdullah Sport City Stadium, Buraidah
Attendance: 4,147
Referee: Hiroyuki Kimura (Japan)

26 April 2022
20:15 UTC+3

Al-Duhail (Qatar)	5–2	(Iran) Sepahan
Olunga 10', 35'; Edmilson 41', 90'; Sassi 50'	Report	Nejadmehdi 20'; Rafiei 82'

King Abdullah Sport City Stadium, Buraidah
Attendance: 26
Referee: Hanna Hattab (Syria)
26 April 2022
23:15 UTC+3

Pakhtakor (Uzbekistan)	5–4	(Saudi Arabia) Al-Taawoun
Fayzullayev 22'; Turgunboev 31'; Sabirkhodjaev 32'; Mirakhmadov 78'; Ergashboyev 86'	Report	Al-Bakr 14'; Al-Nabit 51', 60'; Al-Amri 83' (pen.)

King Abdullah Sport City Stadium, Buraidah
Attendance: 2,681
Referee: Ma Ning (China)

=== Group E ===
Pos	Team	Pld	W	D	L	GF	GA	GD	Pts	Qualification	FAI	NAS	SAD	WEH
1	(Saudi Arabia) Al-Faisaly (H)	6	2	3	1	5	4	+1	9 (Note: Head-to-head points: Al-Faisaly 4, Nasaf Qarshi 1.)	Advance to Round of 16	—	0–0	2–1	1–1
2	(Uzbekistan) Nasaf Qarshi	6	2	3	1	8	5	+3	9	Advance to Round of 16	0–1	—	3–1	2–0
3	(Qatar) Al-Sadd	6	2	1	3	10	11	−1	7		1–0	1–1	—	5–2
4	(Jordan) Al-Wehdat	6	1	3	2	9	12	−3	6		1–1	2–2	3–1	—

Source: AFC
Rules for classification: Tiebreakers
(H) Hosts
Notes:
8 April 2022
20:15 UTC+3

Al-Sadd (Qatar)	1–1	(Uzbekistan) Nasaf Qarshi
Khoukhi 55'	Report	Ró-Ró 31' (o.g.)

Prince Mohamed bin Fahd Stadium, Dammam
Attendance: 230
Referee: Hanna Hattab (Syria)
8 April 2022
23:15 UTC+3

Al-Wehdat (Jordan)	1–1	(Saudi Arabia) Al-Faisaly
Samir 50'	Report	Faik 12'

Prince Mohamed bin Fahd Stadium, Dammam
Attendance: 1,758
Referee: Ahmed Al-Kaf (Oman)

11 April 2022
20:15 UTC+3

Nasaf Qarshi (Uzbekistan)	2–0	(Jordan) Al-Wehdat
Stanojević 71', 85' (pen.)	Report

Prince Mohamed bin Fahd Stadium, Dammam
Attendance: 804
Referee: Kim Hee-gon (South Korea)
11 April 2022
23:15 UTC+3

Al-Faisaly (Saudi Arabia)	2–1	(Qatar) Al-Sadd
Faik 16'; Tavares 53'	Report	Al-Haydos 4'

Prince Mohamed bin Fahd Stadium, Dammam
Attendance: 700
Referee: Fu Ming (China)

15 April 2022
20:15 UTC+3

Al-Sadd (Qatar)	5–2	(Jordan) Al-Wehdat
Afif 23' (pen.); Cazorla 58'; Ayew 62'; Tabata 72'; Al-Bayati 90+3'	Report	Samir 42'; Anas 44'

Prince Mohamed bin Fahd Stadium, Dammam
Attendance: 1,080
Referee: Mohanad Qasim Sarray (Iraq)
15 April 2022
23:15 UTC+3

Nasaf Qarshi (Uzbekistan)	0–1	(Saudi Arabia) Al-Faisaly
	Report	Tavares 29'

Prince Mohamed bin Fahd Stadium, Dammam
Attendance: 200
Referee: Jumpei Iida (Japan)

19 April 2022
20:15 UTC+3

Al-Wehdat (Jordan)	3–1	(Qatar) Al-Sadd
Al-Dmeiri 48'; Assam 60'; Samir 75'	Report	Tabata 54'

Prince Mohamed bin Fahd Stadium, Dammam
Attendance: 400
Referee: Kim Dae-yong (South Korea)
19 April 2022
23:15 UTC+3

Al-Faisaly (Saudi Arabia)	0–0	(Uzbekistan) Nasaf Qarshi
	Report

Prince Mohamed bin Fahd Stadium , Dammam
Attendance: 345
Referee: Ahmed Al-Kaf (Oman)

23 April 2022
20:15 UTC+3

Nasaf Qarshi (Uzbekistan)	3–1	(Qatar) Al-Sadd
Mozgovoy 63', 77'; Norchaev 75'	Report	Tabata 90+1'

Prince Mohamed bin Fahd Stadium, Dammam
Attendance: 85
Referee: Ma Ning (China)
23 April 2022
23:15 UTC+3

Al-Faisaly (Saudi Arabia)	1–1	(Jordan) Al-Wehdat
Boyle 90+3'	Report	Sariweh 90+1'

Prince Mohamed bin Fahd Stadium, Dammam
Attendance: 1,101
Referee: Kim Jong-hyeok (South Korea)

27 April 2022
20:15 UTC+3

Al-Wehdat (Jordan)	2–2	(Uzbekistan) Nasaf Qarshi
Anas 34'; Abu Taha 82'	Report	Stanojević 3'; Norchaev 59'

Prince Mohamed bin Fahd Stadium, Dammam
Attendance: 400
Referee: Fu Ming (China)
27 April 2022
23:15 UTC+3

Al-Sadd (Qatar)	1–0	(Saudi Arabia) Al-Faisaly
Ró-Ró 45+2'	Report

Prince Mohamed bin Fahd Stadium, Dammam
Attendance: 200
Referee: Hettikamkanamge Perera (Sri Lanka)

=== Group F ===
Pos	Team	Pld	W	D	L	GF	GA	GD	Pts	Qualification	DAE	URA	LCS	SDT
1	(South Korea) Daegu FC	6	4	1	1	14	4	+10	13 (Note: Head-to-head points: Daegu FC 4, Urawa Red Diamonds 1.)	Advance to Round of 16	—	1–0	0–3	4–0
2	(Japan) Urawa Red Diamonds	6	4	1	1	20	2	+18	13	Advance to Round of 16	0–0	—	6–0	5–0
3	(Singapore) Lion City Sailors	6	2	1	3	8	14	−6	7		1–2	1–4	—	3–2
4	(China) Shandong Taishan	6	0	1	5	2	24	−22	1		0–7	0–5	0–0	—

Source: AFC
Rules for classification: Tiebreakers
Notes:
15 April 2022
18:00 UTC+7

Shandong Taishan (China)	0–7	(South Korea) Daegu FC
	Report	Lee Keun-ho 15'; Zeca 19', 26', 77'; Hong Chul 48'; Lamas 66'; Jung Chi-in 69'

Buriram City Stadium, Buriram
Attendance: 272
Referee: Khalid Al-Turais (Saudi Arabia)
15 April 2022
21:00 UTC+7

Lion City Sailors (Singapore)	1–4	(Japan) Urawa Red Diamonds
Karlsson 43' (o.g.)	Report	Junker 8'; Esaka 15'; Karlsson 42'; Matsuo 47'

Buriram Stadium, Buriram
Attendance: 394
Referee: Salman Falahi (Qatar)

18 April 2022
18:00 UTC+7

Daegu FC (South Korea)	0–3	(Singapore) Lion City Sailors
	Report	Song Ui-young 21'; Diego Lopes 71'; Pedrão 80'

Buriram City Stadium, Buriram
Attendance: 237
Referee: Omar Al-Ali (United Arab Emirates)
18 April 2022
21:00 UTC+7

Urawa Red Diamonds (Japan)	5–0	(China) Shandong Taishan
Akimoto 26'; Scholz 31' (pen.); Schalk 53', 76'; Yasui 90+2'	Report

Buriram Stadium, Buriram
Attendance: 321
Referee: Nivon Robesh Gamini (Sri Lanka)

21 April 2022
18:00 UTC+7

Shandong Taishan (China)	0–0	(Singapore) Lion City Sailors
	Report

Buriram City Stadium, Buriram
Attendance: 225
Referee: Abdulla Al-Marri (Qatar)
21 April 2022
21:00 UTC+7

Daegu FC (South Korea)	1–0	(Japan) Urawa Red Diamonds
Zeca 53'	Report

Buriram Stadium, Buriram
Attendance: 375
Referee: Ahmed Al-Ali (Jordan)

24 April 2022
18:00 UTC+7

Urawa Red Diamonds (Japan)	0–0	(South Korea) Daegu FC
	Report

Buriram City Stadium, Buriram
Attendance: 436
Referee: Alireza Faghani (Iran)
24 April 2022
21:00 UTC+7

Lion City Sailors (Singapore)	3–2	(China) Shandong Taishan
Song Ui-young 45+2'; Henrique 60'; Lestienne 82'	Report	Lu Yongtao 76' (pen.); Liu Guobao 90'

Buriram Stadium, Buriram
Attendance: 160
Referee: Masoud Tufaylieh (Syria)

27 April 2022
18:00 UTC+7

Urawa Red Diamonds (Japan)	6–0	(Singapore) Lion City Sailors
Mawatari 14'; Schalk 39'; Karlsson 48'; Koizumi 52'; Matsuo 62', 90'	Report

Buriram City Stadium, Buriram
Attendance: 313
Referee: Omar Al-Ali (United Arab Emirates)
27 April 2022
21:00 UTC+7

Daegu FC (South Korea)	4–0	(China) Shandong Taishan
Zeca 8'; Hong Jeong-woon 12'; Lee Keun-ho 57'; Oh Hoo-sung 66'	Report

Buriram Stadium, Buriram
Attendance: 204
Referee: Salman Falahi (Qatar)

30 April 2022
18:00 UTC+7

Shandong Taishan (China)	0–5	(Japan) Urawa Red Diamonds
	Report	Yasui 13'; Chinen 34', 85'; Matsuo 45+1', 69'

Buriram City Stadium, Buriram
Attendance: 393
Referee: Abdulla Al-Marri (Qatar)
30 April 2022
18:00 UTC+7

Lion City Sailors (Singapore)	1–2	(South Korea) Daegu FC
Song Ui-young 26'	Report	Lee Keun-ho 54'; Zeca 81' (pen.)

Buriram Stadium, Buriram
Attendance: 280
Referee: Ahmed Al-Ali (Jordan)

=== Group G ===
Pos	Team	Pld	W	D	L	GF	GA	GD	Pts	Qualification	BGP	MCY	JND	UCT
1	(Thailand) BG Pathum United (H)	6	3	3	0	11	2	+9	12	Advance to Round of 16	—	1–1	0–0	5–0
2	(Australia) Melbourne City	6	3	3	0	10	3	+7	12		0–0	—	2–1	3–0
3	(South Korea) Jeonnam Dragons	6	2	2	2	5	5	0	8		0–2	1–1	—	2–0
4	(Philippines) United City	6	0	0	6	1	17	−16	0		1–3	0–3	0–1	—

Source: AFC
Rules for classification: Tiebreakers
(H) Hosts
15 April 2022
18:00 UTC+7

BG Pathum United (Thailand)	1–1	(Australia) Melbourne City
Teerasil 35'	Report	Nabbout 22'

Pathum Thani Stadium, Pathum Thani
Attendance: 3,189
Referee: Mooud Bonyadifard (Iran)
15 April 2022
21:00 UTC+7

United City (Philippines)	0–1	(South Korea) Jeonnam Dragons
	Report	Pllana 87'

Pathum Thani Stadium, Pathum Thani
Attendance: 1,183
Referee: Ammar Al-Jeneibi (United Arab Emirates)

18 April 2022
18:00 UTC+7

Jeonnam Dragons (South Korea)	0–2	(Thailand) BG Pathum United
	Report	Pathompol 51'; Jakkapan 72'

Pathum Thani Stadium, Pathum Thani
Attendance: 2,671
Referee: Qasim Al-Hatmi (Oman)
18 April 2022
21:00 UTC+7

Melbourne City (Australia)	3–0	(Philippines) United City
Colakovski 34'; Tilio 59', 75'	Report

Pathum Thani Stadium, Pathum Thani
Attendance: 243
Referee: Sadullo Gulmurodi (Tajikistan)

21 April 2022
18:00 UTC+7

BG Pathum United (Thailand)	5–0	(Philippines) United City
Kanokpon 42'; Worachit 75'; Diogo 80'; Robertson 82' (o.g.); Pathompol 87'	Report

Pathum Thani Stadium, Pathum Thani
Attendance: 2,752
Referee: Saoud Al-Athbah (Qatar)
21 April 2022
21:00 UTC+7

Melbourne City (Australia)	2–1	(South Korea) Jeonnam Dragons
Jenkinson 12'; Nabbout 22'	Report	Lee Kyu-hyuk 16'

Pathum Thani Stadium, Pathum Thani
Attendance: 437
Referee: Yoshimi Yamashita (Japan)

24 April 2022
18:00 UTC+7

Jeonnam Dragons (South Korea)	1–1	(Australia) Melbourne City
Kacharava 90+2'	Report	Maclaren 89'

Pathum Thani Stadium, Pathum Thani
Attendance: 256
Referee: Mooud Bonyadifard (Iran)
24 April 2022
21:00 UTC+7

United City (Philippines)	1–3	(Thailand) BG Pathum United
Hartmann 79'	Report	Diogo 17'; Ikhsan 29', 39'

Pathum Thani Stadium, Pathum Thani
Attendance: 2,227
Referee: Zaid Thamer (Iraq)

27 April 2022
18:00 UTC+7

Melbourne City (Australia)	0–0	(Thailand) BG Pathum United
	Report

Pathum Thani Stadium, Pathum Thani
Attendance: 3,699
Referee: Ammar Al-Jeneibi (United Arab Emirates)
27 April 2022
21:00 UTC+7

Jeonnam Dragons (South Korea)	2–0	(Philippines) United City
Pllana 58'; Park In-hyeok 90+3'	Report

Pathum Thani Stadium, Pathum Thani
Attendance: 375
Referee: Qasim Al-Hatmi (Oman)

30 April 2022
18:00 UTC+7

BG Pathum United (Thailand)	0–0	(South Korea) Jeonnam Dragons
	Report

Pathum Thani Stadium, Pathum Thani
Attendance: 4,581
Referee: Mooud Bonyadifard (Iran)
30 April 2022
21:00 UTC+7

United City (Philippines)	0–3	(Australia) Melbourne City
	Report	Rodrigues 22'; Maclaren 68'; Tilio 90'

Pathum Thani Stadium, Pathum Thani
Attendance: 1,014
Referee: Saoud Al-Athbah (Qatar)

=== Group H ===
Pos	Team	Pld	W	D	L	GF	GA	GD	Pts	Qualification	YFM	JBH	HOA	SYD
1	(Japan) Yokohama F. Marinos	6	4	1	1	9	3	+6	13	Advance to Round of 16	—	0–1	2–0	3–0
2	(South Korea) Jeonbuk Hyundai Motors	6	3	3	0	7	4	+3	12	Advance to Round of 16	1–1	—	1–0	0–0
3	(Vietnam) Hoang Anh Gia Lai (H)	6	1	2	3	4	7	−3	5		1–2	1–1	—	1–0
4	(Australia) Sydney FC	6	0	2	4	3	9	−6	2		0–1	2–3	1–1	—

Source: AFC
Rules for classification: Tiebreakers
(H) Hosts
16 April 2022
18:00 UTC+7

Hoàng Anh Gia Lai (Vietnam)	1–2	(Japan) Yokohama F. Marinos
Kida 31' (o.g.)	Report	Léo Ceará 19', 25'

Thống Nhất Stadium, Ho Chi Minh City
Attendance: 11,200
Referee: Mongkolchai Pechsri (Thailand)
16 April 2022
21:00 UTC+7

Jeonbuk Hyundai Motors (South Korea)	0–0	(Australia) Sydney FC
	Report

Thống Nhất Stadium, Ho Chi Minh City
Attendance: 2,013
Referee: Ahmad Al-Ali (Kuwait)

19 April 2022
18:00 UTC+7

Sydney FC (Australia)	1–1	(Vietnam) Hoàng Anh Gia Lai
Buhagiar 59'	Report	Vũ Văn Thanh 26'

Thống Nhất Stadium, Ho Chi Minh City
Attendance: 7,536
Referee: Ammar Mahfoodh (Bahrain)
19 April 2022
21:00 UTC+7

Yokohama F. Marinos (Japan)	0–1	(South Korea) Jeonbuk Hyundai Motors
	Report	Iljutcenko 31' (pen.)

Thống Nhất Stadium, Ho Chi Minh City
Attendance: 1,015
Referee: Abdulrahman Al-Jassim (Qatar)

22 April 2022
18:00 UTC+7

Jeonbuk Hyundai Motors (South Korea)	1–0	(Vietnam) Hoàng Anh Gia Lai
Moon Seon-min 90+3'	Report

Thống Nhất Stadium, Ho Chi Minh City
Attendance: 7,256
Referee: Adel Al-Naqbi (United Arab Emirates)
22 April 2022
21:00 UTC+7

Sydney FC (Australia)	0–1	(Japan) Yokohama F. Marinos
	Report	Tsunoda 80'

Thống Nhất Stadium, Ho Chi Minh City
Attendance: 1,025
Referee: Hassan Akrami (Iran)

25 April 2022
18:00 UTC+7

Yokohama F. Marinos (Japan)	3–0	(Australia) Sydney FC
Saneto 6'; Nishimura 11'; Lopes 87'	Report

Thống Nhất Stadium, Ho Chi Minh City
Attendance: 1,979
Referee: Mongkolchai Pechsri (Thailand)
25 April 2022
21:00 UTC+7

Hoàng Anh Gia Lai (Vietnam)	1–1	(South Korea) Jeonbuk Hyundai Motors
Nguyễn Văn Toàn 62'	Report	Moon Seon-min 17'

Thống Nhất Stadium, Ho Chi Minh City
Attendance: 4,320
Referee: Shukri Al-Hanfosh (Saudi Arabia)

28 April 2022
18:00 UTC+7

Yokohama F. Marinos (Japan)	2–0	(Vietnam) Hoàng Anh Gia Lai
Júnior 36' (pen.); Hatanaka 83'	Report

Thống Nhất Stadium, Ho Chi Minh City
Attendance: 7,268
Referee: Ammar Mahfoodh (Bahrain)
28 April 2022
21:00 UTC+7

Sydney FC (Australia)	2–3	(South Korea) Jeonbuk Hyundai Motors
Le Fondre 40'; Wood 90+1'	Report	Han Kyo-won 49'; Iljutcenko 67'; Gustavo 78'

Thống Nhất Stadium, Ho Chi Minh City
Attendance: 758
Referee: Abdulrahman Al-Jassim (Qatar)

1 May 2022
18:00 UTC+7

Hoàng Anh Gia Lai (Vietnam)	1–0	(Australia) Sydney FC
Brandão 39'	Report

Thống Nhất Stadium, Ho Chi Minh City
Attendance: 11,680
Referee: Ahmad Al-Ali (Kuwait)
1 May 2022
21:00 UTC+7

Jeonbuk Hyundai Motors (South Korea)	1–1	(Japan) Yokohama F. Marinos
Kim Bo-kyung 11'	Report	Lopes 4'

Thống Nhất Stadium, Ho Chi Minh City
Attendance: 1,239
Referee: Hassan Akrami (Iran)

=== Group I ===
Pos	Team	Pld	W	D	L	GF	GA	GD	Pts	Qualification	JDT	KSF	ULS	GZH
1	(Malaysia) Johor Darul Ta'zim (H)	6	4	1	1	11	7	+4	13	Advance to Round of 16	—	0–5	2–1	5–0
2	(Japan) Kawasaki Frontale	6	3	2	1	17	4	+13	11		0–0	—	1–1	1–0
3	(South Korea) Ulsan Hyundai	6	3	1	2	14	7	+7	10		1–2	3–2	—	3–0
4	(China) Guangzhou	6	0	0	6	0	24	−24	0		0–2	0–8	0–5	—

Source: AFC
Rules for classification: Tiebreakers
(H) Hosts
15 April 2022
17:00 UTC+8

Kawasaki Frontale (Japan)	1–1	(South Korea) Ulsan Hyundai
Kurumaya 90+4'	Report	Souza 21'

Tan Sri Dato' Haji Hassan Yunos Stadium, Johor Bahru
Attendance: 114
Referee: Khamis Al-Marri (Qatar)
15 April 2022
22:00 UTC+8

Johor Darul Ta'zim (Malaysia)	5–0	(China) Guangzhou
Bergson 10', 27', 52'; He Lipan 13' (o.g.); Ramadhan 81'	Report

Sultan Ibrahim Stadium, Johor Bahru
Attendance: 14,545
Referee: Mohammed Al-Hoish (Saudi Arabia)

18 April 2022
17:00 UTC+8

Guangzhou (China)	0–8	(Japan) Kawasaki Frontale
	Report	Chinen 7', 12'; Kurumaya 16', 71'; Kobayashi 21', 39'; Miyagi 50'; Chanathip 69'

Tan Sri Dato' Haji Hassan Yunos Stadium, Johor Bahru
Attendance: 98
Referee: Payam Heidari (Iran)
18 April 2022
22:00 UTC+8

Ulsan Hyundai (South Korea)	1–2	(Malaysia) Johor Darul Ta'zim
Um Won-sang 52'	Report	Forestieri 3'; Bergson 80'

Sultan Ibrahim Stadium, Johor Bahru
Attendance: 11,419
Referee: Omar Al-Yaqoubi (Oman)

21 April 2022
17:00 UTC+8

Ulsan Hyundai (South Korea)	3–0	(China) Guangzhou
Koszta 28'; Park Chu-young 57'; Yun Il-lok 68'	Report

Tan Sri Dato' Haji Hassan Yunos Stadium, Johor Bahru
Attendance: 282
Referee: Khamis Al-Marri (Qatar)
21 April 2022
22:00 UTC+8

Kawasaki Frontale (Japan)	0–0	(Malaysia) Johor Darul Ta'zim
	Report

Sultan Ibrahim Stadium, Johor Bahru
Attendance: 17,592
Referee: Mohammed Al-Hoish (Saudi Arabia)

24 April 2022
17:00 UTC+8

Guangzhou (China)	0–5	(South Korea) Ulsan Hyundai
	Report	Yun Il-lok 4'; Koszta 54'; Qazaishvili 64'; Amano 73'; Seol Young-woo 85'

Tan Sri Dato' Haji Hassan Yunos Stadium, Johor Bahru
Attendance: 73
Referee: Omar Al-Yaqoubi (Oman)
24 April 2022
22:00 UTC+8

Johor Darul Ta'zim (Malaysia)	0–5	(Japan) Kawasaki Frontale
	Report	Wakizaka 14'; Kobayashi 31', 43'; Marcinho 81'; Chanathip 88'

Sultan Ibrahim Stadium, Johor Bahru
Attendance: 16,679
Referee: Nawaf Shukralla (Bahrain)

27 April 2022
17:00 UTC+8

Ulsan Hyundai (South Korea)	3–2	(Japan) Kawasaki Frontale
Souza 14'; Um Won-sang 20'; Qazaishvili 47'	Report	Damião 40', 90+2'

Tan Sri Dato' Haji Hassan Yunos Stadium, Johor Bahru
Attendance: 217
Referee: Mohammed Al-Hoish (Saudi Arabia)
27 April 2022
22:00 UTC+8

Guangzhou (China)	0–2	(Malaysia) Johor Darul Ta'zim
	Report	Bergson 16' (pen.), 90+6' (pen.)

Sultan Ibrahim Stadium, Johor Bahru
Attendance: 10,352
Referee: Payam Heidari (Iran)

30 April 2022
17:00 UTC+8

Kawasaki Frontale (Japan)	1–0	(China) Guangzhou
Chinen 14'	Report

Tan Sri Dato' Haji Hassan Yunos Stadium, Johor Bahru
Attendance: 210
Referee: Muhammad Taqi (Singapore)
30 April 2022
17:00 UTC+8

Johor Darul Ta'zim (Malaysia)	2–1	(South Korea) Ulsan Hyundai
Velázquez 5'; Park Yong-woo 90+4' (o.g.)	Report	Amano 6'

Sultan Ibrahim Stadium, Johor Bahru
Attendance: 17,940
Referee: Nawaf Shukralla (Bahrain)

=== Group J ===
Pos	Team	Pld	W	D	L	GF	GA	GD	Pts	Qualification	VKO	KIT	CRU	SHP
1	(Japan) Vissel Kobe	4	2	2	0	10	3	+7	8	Advance to Round of 16	—	2–1	6–0	Canc.
2	(Hong Kong) Kitchee	4	2	1	1	7	6	+1	7	Advance to Round of 16	2–2	—	1–0	Canc.
3	(Thailand) Chiangrai United (H)	4	0	1	3	2	10	−8	1		0–0	2–3	—	Canc.
4	(China) Shanghai Port	0	0	0	0	0	0	0	0	Withdrew	Canc.	Canc.	Canc.	—

Source: AFC
Rules for classification: Tiebreakers
(H) Hosts
16 April 2022
18:00 UTC+7

Kitchee (Hong Kong)	1–0	(Thailand) Chiangrai United
Mingazow 17'	Report

Buriram City Stadium, Buriram
Attendance: 523
Referee: Kim Woo-sung (South Korea)
16 April 2022
21:00 UTC+7

Shanghai Port (China)	Cancelled	(Japan) Vissel Kobe

Buriram Stadium, Buriram

19 April 2022
18:00 UTC+7

Vissel Kobe (Japan)	2–1	(Hong Kong) Kitchee
Goke 15'; Inoue 85'	Report	Akande 90+1'

Buriram City Stadium, Buriram
Attendance: 391
Referee: Alireza Faghani (Iran)
19 April 2022
21:00 UTC+7

Chiangrai United (Thailand)	Cancelled	(China) Shanghai Port

Buriram Stadium, Buriram

22 April 2022
18:00 UTC+7

Shanghai Port (China)	Cancelled	(Hong Kong) Kitchee

Buriram City Stadium, Buriram
22 April 2022
21:00 UTC+7

Vissel Kobe (Japan)	6–0	(Thailand) Chiangrai United
Osako 10'; Yuruki 25', 38'; Goke 32'; Lincoln 58'; Osaki 74'	Report

Buriram Stadium, Buriram
Attendance: 814
Referee: Mohammed Abdulla Hassan Mohamed (United Arab Emirates)

25 April 2022
18:00 UTC+7

Kitchee (Hong Kong)	Cancelled	(China) Shanghai Port

Buriram City Stadium, Buriram
25 April 2022
21:00 UTC+7

Chiangrai United (Thailand)	0–0	(Japan) Vissel Kobe
	Report

Buriram Stadium, Buriram
Attendance: 546
Referee: Bijan Heydari (Iran)

28 April 2022
18:00 UTC+7

Vissel Kobe (Japan)	Cancelled	(China) Shanghai Port

Buriram City Stadium, Buriram
28 April 2022
22:00 UTC+7

Chiangrai United (Thailand)	2–3	(Hong Kong) Kitchee
Phitiwat 45+2' (pen.); Sarawut 79'	Report	Akande 55'; Damjanović 70'; Law Tsz Chun 81'

Buriram Stadium, Buriram
Attendance: 304
Referee: Khalid Al-Turais (Saudi Arabia)

1 May 2022
18:00 UTC+7

Kitchee (Hong Kong)	2–2	(Japan) Vissel Kobe
Damjanović 45+3' (pen.); Baena 90+1'	Report	Lincoln 44' (pen.); Muto 87'

Buriram Stadium, Buriram
Attendance: 412
Referee: Mohammed Abdulla Hassan Mohamed (United Arab Emirates)
1 May 2022
18:00 UTC+7

Shanghai Port (China)	Cancelled	(Thailand) Chiangrai United

Buriram City Stadium, Buriram

== Ranking of second-placed teams ==
=== West Region ===
Pos	Grp	Team	Pld	W	D	L	GF	GA	GD	Pts	Qualification
1	A	(Qatar) Al-Rayyan	6	4	1	1	10	7	+3	13	Advance to Round of 16
2	C	(United Arab Emirates) Shabab Al-Ahli	6	2	4	0	14	7	+7	10	Advance to Round of 16
3	E	(Uzbekistan) Nasaf Qarshi	6	2	3	1	8	5	+3	9	Advance to Round of 16
4	D	(Saudi Arabia) Al-Taawoun	6	2	1	3	13	12	+1	7	
5	B	(India) Mumbai City	6	2	1	3	3	11	−8	7	

Source: AFC
Rules for classification: 1) Points; 2) Goal difference; 3) Goals scored; 4) Disciplinary points; 5) Drawing of lots.

=== East Region ===
As Group J only had three teams remaining, the results against fourth-placed teams in Groups F–I were omitted in this ranking.

Pos	Grp	Team	Pld	W	D	L	GF	GA	GD	Pts	Qualification
1	H	(South Korea) Jeonbuk Hyundai Motors	4	2	2	0	3	1	+2	8	Advance to Round of 16
2	F	(Japan) Urawa Red Diamonds	4	2	1	1	10	2	+8	7	Advance to Round of 16
3	J	(Hong Kong) Kitchee	4	2	1	1	7	6	+1	7	Advance to Round of 16
4	G	(Australia) Melbourne City	4	1	3	0	4	3	+1	6	
5	I	(Japan) Kawasaki Frontale	4	1	2	1	8	4	+4	5	

Source: AFC
Rules for classification: 1) Points; 2) Goal difference; 3) Goals scored; 4) Disciplinary points; 5) Drawing of lots.
